= List of Hollyoaks characters introduced in 2010 =

Hollyoaks is a long-running Channel 4 soap opera in the United Kingdom. This is a list of characters who first appeared on the programme during 2010, listed in order of their first appearance.

In January 2010, it was announced that Paul Marquess would be taking over the role of series producer from Lucy Allan, who had been with the show for one year. Marquess fully took control on 17 January 2010, onwards. March saw the introduction of Jem Costello, a new love interest for Gilly Roach. The character of Eva Strong was introduced in April as the biological mother of Anita Roy, and Texas Longford joined Hollyoaks in May. Marquess's first major casting was former Footballers Wives actress Phina Oruche in the role of Gabby Sharpe along with her children Amber and Taylor and husband Phil, all of whom appeared in June. In July, the Costellos became the second family of the year to be introduced, consisting of Carl and Heidi Costello and their sons Seth and Riley. July also saw the arrivals of Heidi's cousin Mitzeee Minniver and student Kevin Smith. Three characters joined in August: Jasmine Costello, Heidi and Carl's daughter; Bart McQueen, a member of the long-established McQueen family; and Brendan Brady, Cheryl Brady's half-brother. In September, the O'Connors were introduced, with daughter Sinead, son Finn, stepmother Diane and father Rob, and new students Leanne Holiday, Jamil Fadel and Doug Carter. London West End star Darren Day joined the cast in October, playing Danny Houston.

== Jamie ==
Jamie
- Hollyoaks character
- Portrayed by: Finn Jones
- First appearance: 2 January 2010
- Last appearance: 11 February 2010
- Introduced by: Lucy Allan
- Spin-off appearances: Hollyoaks Later (2009)
In-universe information
- Occupation: Drug dealer (until 2010)

Jamie, played by Finn Jones, first appeared on-screen on 28 September 2009 during the second series of the soap's spin-off series, Hollyoaks Later, as a new love interest for established character, Hannah Ashworth (Emma Rigby). Jones reprised the role in main Hollyoaks episodes in 2010, which coincided with the departure of Hannah. Jamie appeared in Hollyoaks between 2 January and 11 February 2010. The character of Jamie was created as a temporary love interest for Hannah and was intended to feature only in Hollyoaks Later, the spin-off from the Hollyoaks series. In October 2009, it was announced that Jones was to reprise his role of Finn for the departure of Hannah. Of Jamie's return, a Hollyoaks source commented: "Hannah's had a terrible time of late and Jamie's sudden arrival in the village next year reopens a wound that's only just started to heal."

Hannah goes to a music festival with her brothers Rhys (Andrew Moss) and Josh Ashworth (Sonny Flood) where she meets Jamie. When Hannah falls off a podium, Jamie catches her and they begin to develop feelings for each other. Jamie and his friend Imogen (Holly Gilbert) invite Hannah to stay at their house for the night. Jamie and Hannah spend the night on the beach together. Jamie begs an angry Hannah to stay after Imogen tells her that Jamie is a drug dealer. Jamie and Hannah each take an ecstasy pill and they sleep together. Jamie asks Hannah to stay with him, to which she agrees. When Hannah discovers that Imogen is prostituting herself, Imogen's pimp Kev (James Cartwright) hits her. Jamie is woken by the shouting and rushes downstairs, where he distracts Kev as Hannah escapes. Hannah hides in the ice cream van and lets Jamie in, where they drive away. Jamie finds Kev's drugs in the ice cream van and thinks he can sell them, but Hannah tells him Kev will want revenge. They then plan to leave together. Hannah throws away the drugs that Jamie found and tells him that he does not need to deal drugs anymore. Jamie then frantically tries to retrieve them and Hannah realises that he has chosen drugs over her. Hannah decides to leave.

In February 2010, Hannah arrives at The Dog in the Pond public house and finds Jamie talking to her mother Suzanne Ashworth (Suzanne Hall). Jamie tells Hannah that he is no longer dealing drugs, however Hannah asks him to leave. Hannah tells Jamie to leave before Rhys finds him. Rhys tells Jamie to stay away from Hannah. Jamie then calls Hannah and tells her that he loves her. Hannah's friend Nancy Hayton (Jessica Fox) meets Jamie and takes a dislike to him after becoming concerned for Hannah's safety. Hannah later meets up with Jamie who is in pain, and realises that Rhys beat him up. Jamie asks Hannah to leave with him and kisses her. Hannah responds, but insists that their relationship has to be on her terms. Hannah's husband Darren Osborne (Ashley Taylor Dawson) asks Jamie for drugs after he and Rhys plan to set Jamie up. Jamie tells Darren that he does not deal drugs. Suzanne attempts to find out how serious Jamie and Hannah's relationship is and shows him Hannah's video diary whilst she was suffering from anorexia nervosa. Jamie is shocked but tells Suzanne that he will take care of Hannah. As Jamie goes to meet Hannah, he is stopped and beaten. He is thrown into the boot of a car and dumped in the woods by Rhys and Darren, where Rhys tells him to stay away from Hannah. Jamie returns to The Dog in the Pond and when Hannah asked him what happened, he points at Rhys and Darren.

Jamie is worried when he gets a text from Blue (Kyle Rees) and begins to panic. Jamie then persuades Hannah to leave the following day. At Hannah's leaving party, Jamie receives a call from Blue and quickly begins to pack his bag. Whilst packing, Jamie discovers that the money from his bag is missing. When Blue calls again for the missing money, Jamie begins to panic and sends Hannah out whilst he looks for it. Jamie finds out that Rhys has the money and Rhys gives him an ultimatum, to leave with the money alone, or leave without it with Hannah. When Hannah's family say goodbye to her, Jamie arrives late. Jamie and Hannah stay in a hotel after their flight is delayed and Hannah finds their room trashed. Jamie returns to find Blue with Hannah and admits that he stole the money and explains that he no longer has it. Jamie calls Rhys to prove that he does not have the money, but Rhys denies any involvement. Jamie and Blue fight and as Jamie struggles to defend himself, he reaches for a letter opener and stabs Blue. Hannah begs Jamie to call an ambulance, but he refuses and asks her to leave Blue and go on the run with him. Hannah says she is not leaving until an ambulance is called and Jamie agrees. Jamie then tries to leave and when Hannah refuses, he grabs their bags and drags Hannah to the door. Jamie finds Darren at the door and attempts to leave, but Darren refuses to move. Hannah tells Darren she loves Jamie and they rush down the corridor, but the police confront them. Jamie becomes angry and thinks that Darren called them, but Hannah tells him that she called them. Jamie then pulls the letter opener from his pocket and points it in Hannah's back. He begins to usher her out of the building and warns the police that if they try to stop him, he will kill Hannah. Darren then jumps to save Hannah, but Jamie stabs him. Jamie is arrested by the police.

== Martin Campbell ==
Martin Campbell
- Hollyoaks character
- Portrayed by: Grant Masters
- Duration: 2010
- First appearance: 19 February 2010
- Last appearance: 18 June 2010
- Introduced by: Lucy Allan
In-universe information
- Sons: Ricky Campbell

Martin Campbell, played by Grant Masters, is the father of established character Ricky Campbell (Ashley Margolis). He made his first on-screen appearance on 19 February 2010. He made his final appearance on 18 June 2010.

In December 2009, in an interview with Digital Spy series producer Lucy Allan revealed that Ricky had a secret, commenting: [...] "And Ricky has a secret, so we'll meet elements of his family..." In early 2010, Inside Soap revealed that a new character called Martin would be joining the show and that Hollyoaks producers were not revealing any information about the character. In February 2010, it was revealed that Martin was Ricky's father who suffers from Multiple sclerosis, and that Ricky is his full-time carer.

When Ricky Campbell begins to disappear frequently, his best friend Duncan Button (Dean Aspen) decides to find out what he is doing. Duncan sees Ricky making a transaction with someone and follows him. When Ricky enters a flat, Duncan hears raised voices and sees Martin on the floor with Ricky standing over him with blood on his hands. Ricky helps Martin and sees to his injuries. Duncan then demands to be let in the flat and accuses Ricky of being a drug dealer and attacking Martin. Ricky reveals that Martin is his father. Martin tells Ricky to get rid of Duncan and Ricky pushes Duncan out of the door. Ricky later admits to Duncan that Martin is suffering from Multiple sclerosis. When Ricky is given detention at school, Duncan visits Martin and tells him that he is there to wait for Ricky. Martin pretends not to be ill and offers to cook dinner for Duncan. Martin struggles whilst reaching for the tomato ketchup and falls. He tells Duncan to keep his fall a secret. Duncan helps Martin before Ricky arrives. Ricky decides to audition to be a DJ at Duncan's birthday party and when he returns home to get his records he finds Martin on the floor. Martin realises that Ricky has something to do and tells him to go.

Ricky gets detention at school and Martin calls him needing help. Ricky attempts to leave but school mentor Kris Fisher (Gerard McCarthy) mistakenly hurts his arm. Martin discovers bruises on Ricky's arm and is angry when he hears that a staff member at school was responsible for the injury. Kris visits Martin to discuss Ricky's school attendance. Ricky begins to worry that Kris will find out Martin illness and Duncan causes a distraction. Martin then discovers that Kris was responsible for hurting Ricky. Martin attempts to hit Kris, but falls out of his wheelchair. Martin is later rushed to hospital and Kris learns that he is suffering from Multiple sclerosis. Kris tries to persuade Ricky to get help for Martin, but he refuses. When Kris tells Ricky that he is going to phone social services, Ricky threatens to tell them that Kris hurt his arm. Kris begins to give daily help to Martin and Ricky. When it becomes apparent that Kris and Ricky are spending more time together, Kris resigns to protect Martin and Ricky's secret.

Ricky begins to struggle caring for Martin. Kris urges Martin to tell Ricky that his condition is worsening. Martin refuses as he does not want Ricky to fail his GCSE examinations. Martin then asks Kris to assist him in suicide but Kris says he cannot, which leaves Martin trying to find other methods of suicide. Kris calls for professional help and Martin is taken to hospital, leaving Ricky angry. Duncan overhears Martin talking about his planned suicide and makes him promise that he will never go through with it. When Ricky visits Martin, he realises that his condition has worsened.

== Meriel Vaughn ==
Meriel Vaughn
- Hollyoaks character
- Portrayed by: Emily Corselli
- First appearance: 26 February 2010
- Last appearance: 29 July 2010
- Introduced by: Lucy Allan
In-universe information
- Occupation: Journalist

Meriel Vaughn played by Emily Corselli, is an ambitious journalist, trying to get exclusive details from the Holly abduction case. She left on 2 March 2010 Meriel returns when Michaela McQueen starts working for the Chester Herald, where they begin a feud. In June 2010, Meriel is angry when Michaela gains an exclusive interview with her sister Carmel over the murder of Calvin Valentine gets on the front page of the Herald. When Michaela goes along with a gang of thugs for another story, Meriel follows her, and sees Michaela being locked in a shed. While Michaela is unavailable, Meriel tries to get Zak to talk about his attack on Tariq Mistry, and when he rebuffs her, she calls the police about Zak's crime. By the time Michaela is freed, Zak has been arrested, and Meriel gloats that the story will be on the front page of the paper. She was not seen again.

== Jem Costello ==
Jem Costello, played by Helen Russell-Clark, made her first on-screen appearance on 5 March 2010. The character was created as the love interest of Gilly Roach (Anthony Quinlan). She is the daughter of Carl Costello (Paul Opacic), stepdaughter of Heidi Costello (Kim Tiddy) and the half sister of Riley (Rob Norbury), Seth and Jasmine. Jem has been described as quite feisty and a "freespirit".

== Caroline ==
Caroline
- Hollyoaks character
- Portrayed by: Amber Hodgkiss
- First appearance: 26 March 2010
- Last appearance: 2 April 2010
- Introduced by: Lucy Allan
In-universe information
- Sons: Johnny

Caroline, played by Amber Hodgekiss, is a nurse who helped care for Jake Dean (Kevin Sacre) when he was in a mental hospital. Jake later goes to stay with Caroline, she then sleeps with him. After deciding she wanted revenge on Jake for wanting to leave her, she tied him up, drugged him, tried to cause a gas explosion in her caravan. After drugging Jake up once more she set out to attack Holly Hutchinson (Lydia Walters). When she visits Holly, she finds Loretta Jones (Melissa Walton) at her bedside, angry with Loretta because of her relationship with Jake, she tries to stab Loretta with a medicinal needle. Jake comes to her aid and in the process Caroline is stabbed with the needle. Loretta learns Jake had slept with Caroline and leaves Jake.

Amber Hodgkiss had originally been cast to play a different character, Chrissy, during 2009. Chrissy was supposed to be an old childhood friend of Loretta and they were intended to have been involved in a storyline where they would be revealed as having murdered someone as children, which mirrored James Bulger's murder in 1993. The first few scenes of Loretta meeting Chrissy were recorded, but the storyline was later axed, as it had caused too much controversy. The scenes with Chrissy were cut, but Hodgkiss was recast as Jake's ex-nurse, Caroline, and scenes with her new character were hastily recorded to replace those of the axed storyline.

== Olly Larkin ==
Olly Larkin
- Hollyoaks character
- Portrayed by: Oliver Watton
- First appearance: 31 March 2010
- Last appearance: 4 June 2010
- Introduced by: Lucy Allan

Olly Larkin, played by Oliver Watton, is the new love interest of Amy Barnes (Ashley Slanina-Davies). Olly comes across as being perfect, even being fine with Amy having two children. On a date with Amy, Ste Hay (Kieron Richardson) and Josh Ashworth (Sonny Flood) try and ruin their date, but they get along despite their efforts, he also wins Josh over offering to buy him tickets for a gig. Olly leaves Amy when he finds out Josh and Ste aren't just her flatmates but her exes. However, the two reconcile and get back together.

Olly starts to show a bad side when he constantly riles Ste, and he becomes increasingly angry when Amy does not want to have sex with him. He gets her extremely drunk at the SU Bar, but when they return home, Ste makes sure nothing happens. Soon, during a night home alone with Amy, Olly locks Ste in Il Gnosh so that they will not be interrupted. When Olly returns to the flat, Amy explains she's not ready to have sex with him, which makes him angry. Olly tries to force himself onto Amy, but Ste escapes from Il Gnosh and saves her. The next day Amy reports him to the police for attempted rape and he was not seen again.

== Tariq Mistry ==
Tariq Mistry
- Hollyoaks character
- Portrayed by: Rudi Dharmalingham
- First appearance: 20 April 2010
- Last appearance: 3 August 2010
- Introduced by: Lucy Allan

Tariq Mistry, played by Rudi Dharmalingham first appears talking to Zak Ramsey (Kent Riley), about his brother, Caleb Ramsey's (Michael Ryan) death. Tariq was a friend of Caleb's. When Tariq met Des Townsend (Kris Deedigan), Des didn't like him. It is revealed that Tariq actually caused Caleb's death as while they were on patrol, a little boy was in trouble. Tariq decided to save him and tells Caleb to drive the opposite direction, which led him to a roadside bomb, killing him. Zak is outrageously furious and strongly beats Tariq in a park and he is hospitalised. He was last seen when Meriel Vaughn and Michaela McQueen (Hollie-Jay Bowes) were interviewing him about his attack. However, Michaela found out it was her boyfriend, Zak, who attacked him. Tariq left in May. He later return in August and told Zak he would not go to the police after he could see he was sorry for attacking him.

== Eva Strong ==
Eva Strong, played by former Emmerdale actress Sheree Murphy, made her first on-screen appearance on 23 April 2010. Murphy's casting was announced on 24 February 2010. She is the biological mother of Anita Roy (Saira Choudhry). Eva has been described as "free-spirited and enigmatic".

== Kyle Ryder ==
Kyle Ryder
- Hollyoaks character
- Portrayed by: Neil Toon
- Duration: 2010–2011
- First appearance: 28 April 2010
- Last appearance: 11 February 2011
- Created by: Lucy Allan
- Introduced by: Lucy Allan (2010); Paul Marquess (2011)

Kyle Ryder, played by Neil Toon, first appears trying to start his car after it breaks down in the village. Theresa McQueen (Jorgie Porter) and Anita Roy (Saira Choudhry) see Kyle and Theresa fixes his car. Kyle and Theresa grow close, despite her cousin Jacqui McQueen (Claire Cooper) discovering his drug dealing. Kyle is caught drug dealing by ex-police officer Calvin Valentine (Ricky Whittle), who then bars him from The Loft nightclub. Kyle and his gang then attempt to beat Calvin up. Calvin accuses Kyle of sending him death threats, but later buys a gun from him for his own protection. On Calvin's wedding day, Kyle returns for the gun, unaware it was stolen. On the same day, Theresa, who is pregnant with Calvin's child, shoots and kills Calvin. Kyle discovers Theresa's pregnancy and that she lied he was the father. Suspicious, Kyle threatens Theresa and shouts at her until she admits she killed Calvin. Kyle is later arrested for Calvin's murder.

Months later, Theresa feels pressured as Kyle's trial approaches. Police officer Ethan Scott (Craig Vye) tells her Kyle is continuing to say Theresa killed Calvin. Warren Fox (Jamie Lomas) agrees to help Theresa, so pays men to beat Kyle up in prison and free him once he is taken to hospital. Brendan Brady (Emmett J. Scanlan) pretends to be Warren and questions Kyle, who tells him Theresa killed Calvin.

Kyle visits Brendan, telling him that he's going to get a confession out of Theresa. He later kidnaps her and her baby Kathleen-Angel, taking her to an abandoned bank, where Theresa attempts to escape, but is re-captured. Warren arrives, but is tricked by Kyle and gets knocked out and locked in a vault. Kyle and Theresa are met by Ethan and Carmel, where he forces Theresa to confess to killing Calvin to Ethan. Ethan then attacks Kyle, but Kyle throws him down an elevator shaft. Kyle panics and takes Kathleen-Angel, but Warren has escaped from the vault and shoots him in the back. As Kyle turns and falls into the shaft, Warren sees the baby in his arms. As Theresa, Carmel and Warren look down the shaft, they see Ethan holding the baby on top of an elevator only a few metres down. Kyle lies motionless on top of Ethan. Theresa falls into the shaft and the platform holding them up falls, and Kyle's lifeless body is thrown to the bottom of the building.

Kyle made a cameo appearance in Hollyoaks later 2013.

== Texas Longford ==
Texas Savage (also Longford), played by Bianca Hendrickse-Spendlove, made her first on-screen appearance on 17 May 2010. On 3 May 2010, it was announced that India Longford's (Beth Kingston) older sister would arrive for her birthday. Texas initially appeared as a guest character between 17 and 21 May. It was announced on 7 July 2010 that Hendrickse-Spendlove would be reprising the role of Texas full-time. The character made her on-screen return on 24 August 2010. Texas has been described as a "force of nature" and "vulnerable at heart".

== Gabby Sharpe ==
Gabby Sharpe, played by former Footballers Wives actress Phina Oruche, made her first on-screen appearance on 18 June 2010. Oruche's casting was announced on 29 March 2010. Gabby was the first character created and introduced as part of Marquess's rejuvenation of the serial. She is the wife of Phil (Andonis Anthony) and the mother of Amber (Lydia Lloyd-Henry) and Taylor (Shaun Blackstock). Gabby has been described as "strong yet nurturing" and "extremely tolerant" unless pushed to breaking point.

== Amber Sharpe ==
Amber Sharpe, played by Lydia Lloyd-Henry, made her first on-screen appearance on 21 June 2010. Lloyd-Henry's casting was announced on 12 April 2010. She is the daughter of Gabby (Phina Oruche) and Phil Sharpe (Andonis Anthony) and the sister of Taylor (Shaun Blackstock). Amber has been described as "a real live wire" and a "spitfire" who questions everything.

== Taylor Sharpe ==
Taylor Sharpe
- Hollyoaks character
- Portrayed by: Shaun Blackstock
- First appearance: 21 June 2010
- Last appearance: 17 December 2010
- Introduced by: Paul Marquess
In-universe information
- Family: Sharpe
- Father: Phil Sharpe
- Mother: Gabby Sharpe
- Sisters: Amber Sharpe
- Half-brothers: Arlo Davenport; Tré Davenport
- Nieces: Bella Sharpe

Taylor Sharpe, played by Shaun Blackstock, is the son of Gabby (Phina Oruche) and Phil Sharpe (Andonis Anthony).

Tony Hutchinson (Nick Pickard), who helps Gabby after she is run over, tries to support Taylor and Amber whilst Gabby is in hospital. Taylor is initially not sure about Tony but warms to him when they have a cooking lesson. Taylor and Amber are surprised when they return home and find their belongings missing, not realising their mother had planned to run away with them while their father was gone. They Sharpes eventually move in with Tony. Taylor befriends Duncan Button (Dean Aspen) and invites him home to play computer games. However, Taylor pushes Duncan out after he discovers Duncan's attraction for Gabby. Taylor later urges Gabby and Tony to get together, which they do.

Taylor becomes friends with Arlo Davenport (Travis Yates) and is invited to his house, where he meets Arlo's mother Helen (Emma Vaudrey) and younger brother Tré (Charlie Behan). Taylor is shocked when Phil arrives at Arlo's house and is referred to as Arlo's father. Phil takes Taylor home and makes him swear not to say anything. However, Taylor tries to tell Amber, who refuses to believe him. Taylor tells Gabby and Phil admits everything. The Davenports discover the truth and Taylor and Arlo agree to be friends. However, Taylor becomes jealous when Arlo takes Sinead O'Connor (Stephanie Davis) to a school dance. The Sharpes leave Hollyoaks to live with Gabby's father after the O'Connors discover Amber's obsession with Rob O'Connor (Gary Cargill).

== Phil Sharpe ==
Phil Sharpe
- Hollyoaks character
- Portrayed by: Andonis Anthony
- First appearance: 25 June 2010
- Last appearance: 13 December 2010
- Introduced by: Paul Marquess
In-universe information
- Family: Sharpe
- Wife: Gabby Sharpe
- Sons: Arlo Davenport; Taylor Sharpe; Tré Davenport
- Daughters: Amber Sharpe
- Granddaughters: Bella Sharpe

Phil Sharpe, played by Andonis Anthony, is the husband of Gabby Sharpe (Phina Oruche) who first appears when he visits his wife in hospital following an accident on 25 June 2010.

Phil is next seen when he and Gabby have dinner at Il Gnosh. However, the night does not end well when Phil loses his temper. After this, Gabby, who had already been planning to leave Phil, moves out and into Tony Hutchinson's (Nick Pickard) home in Hollyoaks with Amber (Lydia Lloyd-Henry) and Taylor (Shaun Blackstock). Amber calls Phil after catching Tony and Gabby kissing, and tells him they are having an affair. Phil argues with Gabby and Tony and ends up punching Tony. Phil is annoyed and embarrassed after he finds out that Amber was lying and that they only kissed that night. Taylor is shocked when Phil arrives at Arlo Davenport's (Travis Yates) house, and is called 'daddy' by Arlo's younger brother Tré (Charlie Behan). Taylor soon realises that Phil has another family, and storms out. Phil makes Taylor keep quiet, but he eventually tells Amber, Tony and Gabby. Phil pleads for his family to forgive him, but after learning of Amber's pregnancy, he rejects his children.

== Rose Townsend ==
Rose Townsend
- Hollyoaks character
- Portrayed by: Libby Davison
- First appearance: 28 June 2010
- Last appearance: 6 August 2010
- Introduced by: Paul Marquess
In-universe information
- Brothers: Des Townsend

Rose Townsend, played by Libby Davison, is the older sister of Des Townsend (Kris Deedigan). Rose brought up Des after their parents died. Des' girlfriend Jacqui McQueen (Claire Cooper) sees Rose and Des alone and assumes they are having an affair. Des explains their relationship and Rose goes to the McQueens for tea and seems to enjoy herself. Rose is disturbed to learn Jacqui had a mixed-race sister, Tina Reilly (Leah Hackett), and it is revealed Rose and Des share racist views. Rose succeeds in her efforts to turn Des against Asian Ravi Roy (Stephen Uppal). When Des is still slightly ambivalent, Rose threatens to disown him. She then helps him in his efforts to plant a smoke bomb inside Ravi's restaurant, Relish. She was again much more angry when Des proposed to Jacqui. To her relief, Jacqui declines his proposal when discovering about his racist attacks and this causes him to subsequently leave the village. Rose is not seen again.

== Carl Costello ==
Carl Costello, played by former Emmerdale actor Paul Opacic, made his first on-screen appearance on 19 July 2010. Opacic's casting was announced on 12 April 2010. He is the husband of Heidi (Kim Tiddy) and the father of Jem (Helen Russell-Clark), Riley (Rob Norbury), Seth (Miles Higson) and Jasmine (Victoria Atkin). Carl has been described as a "self-assured smooth operator who's charming, but will play things underhand".

== Seth Costello ==
Seth Costello, played by Miles Higson, made his first on-screen appearance on 20 July 2010.

== Riley Costello ==
Riley Costello, played by former Grange Hill actor Rob Norbury, made his first on-screen appearance on 20 July 2010. Norbury's casting was announced on 12 April 2010. He is the son of Carl (Paul Opacic) and Heidi Costello (Kim Tiddy) and the brother of Jem (Helen Russell-Clark), Seth (Miles Higson) and Jasmine (Victoria Atkin). Riley has been described as a "Jack-the-lad" and a "lothario". Riley departed on 3 October 2012.

== Heidi Costello ==
Heidi Costello, played by former The Bill actress Kim Tiddy, made her first on-screen appearance on 20 July 2010. Tiddy's casting was announced on 12 April 2010. She is the wife of Carl Costello (Paul Opacic) and the mother of Riley (Rob Norbury), Seth (Miles Higson) and Jasmine (Victoria Atkin). Heidi has been described as "strong, glamorous and slightly insecure".

== Mitzeee Minniver ==
Anne "Mitzeee" Minniver, played by Rachel Shenton, made her first on-screen appearance on 23 July 2010. Shenton's casting was announced on 12 April 2010. She is the cousin of Heidi Costello (Kim Tiddy). Mitzeee was created by Marquess for a different television series which was never commissioned and instead introduced her to Hollyoaks. She has been described as an "aspiring glamour model" who is likely to cause havoc in the village. Her sister, Maxine Minniver (Nikki Sanderson) is still on the show.

== Kevin Smith ==
Kevin Smith
- Hollyoaks character
- Portrayed by: Cameron Crighton
- First appearance: 29 July 2010
- Last appearance: 4 November 2010
- Created by: Paul Marquess
In-universe information
- Occupation: Student

Kevin Smith, played by Cameron Crighton, first appeared on 29 July 2010. He arrives during a storyline with Elliot Bevan (Garnon Davies), where Kevin tries to convince everyone he is an alien. He is set to become a fresher student along with Lee Hunter (Alex Carter), Doug Carter (PJ Brennan), Jamil Fadel (Sikander Malik) and Leanne Holiday (Jessica Forrest).

Information on the character first surfaced during Paul Marquess's reinvention of the serial. The storyline was publicised by the media, who described it as an odd alien storyline. At that point there was no official confirmation of the storyline being true, until actress Hollie-Jay Bowes who played Michaela McQueen confirmed details of the plot, which contributed in her dismissal from the serial. Actor Cameron Crighton was cast in the role and he expressed his delight to be joining a show that was widely known and stated he it took ages to sink in. Crighton's final scenes were due to be aired on 9 November 2010. But they did not make the final cut.

On his arrival, after he befriends Elliot he begins telling him that he is desperate to get home to his planet which he claims to have been sent from. Nancy Hayton (Jessica Fox) and Kris Fisher (Gerard McCarthy) have a hard time believing this. He later makes friends with a young Tom Cunningham (Ellis Hollins) and cheers him up and helping him believe in life after death. In Fresher's week, Kevin and Doug clash, meanwhile the other students think he is odd. He sees Leanne and Doug kiss and decides to tell Lee of their infidelity. Doug then finds out some secrets about Kevin's past. Despite his housemates finding out the truth, Kevin still keeps up the pretence of being an alien and attempts to build a Beacon, with the help of Elliot, in order for his parents to find him. Elliot finds Kevin's birth certificate and works out the truth. When the beacon is finally turned on he gives Tom a telescope as a gift. Kevin also secures Elliot a new job at NASA before leaving Hollyoaks.

== Jason Costello ==
Jason Costello, played by Victoria Atkin, made her first on-screen appearance on 2 August 2010. Atkins's casting was announced on 1 July 2010 where it was revealed that "Jasmine" would suffer from Gender Identity Disorder. He is the son of Carl (Paul Opacic) and Heidi Costello (Kim Tiddy), the brother of Jem (Helen Russell-Clark) and Riley (Rob Norbury) and the twin of Seth (Miles Higson). "Jasmine" has been described as a "cosseted, overly protected little girl".

== Bart McQueen ==
Bart McQueen, played by Jonny Clarke, made his first on-screen appearance on 4 August 2010. Clarke's casting was announced on 25 June 2010, as an extension of the established McQueen family. Bart is named after The Simpsons character Bart Simpson and is described as "lad's lad".

== Brendan Brady ==
Brendan Brady, played by Emmett J. Scanlan, made his first on-screen appearance on 5 August 2010. Scanlan's casting was announced on 25 June 2010. He is the brother of Cheryl Brady (Bronagh Waugh). Brendan has been described as a "dodgy dealer" and "a complex character". Brendan and Cheryl both departed the serial on 22 March 2013.

== Veronica ==
Veronica
- Hollyoaks character
- Portrayed by: Lynsey McLaren
- First appearance: 6 August 2010
- Last appearance: 8 October 2010
- Introduced by: Paul Marquess

Veronica, played by Lynsey McLaren, first appeared on 9 August 2010. She is first seen outside The Dog in the Pond when Brendan Brady (Emmett J. Scanlan) catches her eye. Brendan offers to buy her a drink and she accepts. She then gets talking to Malachy Fisher (Glen Wallace) and they share a couple of drinks together. She later goes home with Malachy, kissing him and they head upstairs. She ties him to his bed, tricking him into thinking they were about to have sex, when she actually did it to trap him whilst she could steal money and items of jewellery from the McQueens. She admits Malachy is a nice person, kissing him before leaving him tied up. Veronica steals everything from the McQueen home then went on to rob Evissa. Malachy manages to track her down, and ties her up. She plays on his marital problems with Mercedes Fisher (Jennifer Metcalfe) to get him to leave the keys to the van full of stolen goods, but later, he sends Mercedes to the address, and she attacks Veronica for helping break up her marriage. Brendan, who had been working with Veronica, shows up later, and Veronica berates him for getting her involved with insane Mercedes.

Veronica later blackmails Brendan, who sets her up to get arrested by Carmel Valentine (Gemma Merna). She makes another appearance when Brendan uses her to try and split up Rae Wilson (Alice Barlow) and Ste Hay (Kieron Richardson).

== Trish Minniver ==
Trish Minniver
- Hollyoaks character
- Portrayed by: Paula Wolfenden (2010–2012); Denise Welch (2021–2022)
- Duration: 2010–2012, 2021–2022
- First appearance: Episode 2882; 10 August 2010
- Last appearance: Episode 5756; 4 January 2022
- Created by: Paul Marquess (2010); Bryan Kirkwood (2021)
In-universe information
- Occupation: Dance teacher
- Half-sisters: Joan Blissett
- Husband: Mick Minniver (backstory)
- Daughters: Maxine Minniver; Mitzeee Minniver
- Grandsons: Phoenix Costello
- Granddaughters: Minnie Minniver
- Nieces: Heidi Costello; Wendy Blissett
- Other relatives: Riley Costello; Seth Costello; Jason Costello; Bobby Costello

Trish Minniver, played by Paula Wolfenden from 2010 to 2012 and Denise Welch from 2021, is the mother of Mitzeee (Rachel Shenton) and Maxine Minniver (Nikki Sanderson), who arrives on her birthday to see her family. It is revealed that she has bitter feelings towards her niece "that she treated like a sister" Heidi Costello (Kim Tiddy), this is because Trish used to date Carl Costello (Paul Opacic) before he left her for Heidi. She appears to be using her daughter Mitzeee in her plan to make Carl and his family's life hell. Trish reappears at Christmas 2010 with Mitzeee and makes peace with Heidi and Carl, before befriending Myra McQueen (Nicole Barber-Lane). Trish encourages Heidi to be more accepting of her transgender son Jason Costello (Victoria Atkin).

Mitzeee is shocked to discover that Ethan Scott (Craig Vye) has arrested Trish, and blackmails her into getting Warren Fox (Jamie Lomas) to confess to the murder of Louise Summers (Roxanne McKee) or Trish will be sent down for two years. However, this later backfires and Trish is released without charge. Trish later appears in Mitzeee's imagination while she is in prison. Trish offers Mitzeee advice and she soon realises that Trish is not really there.

On 19 October 2020, it was announced that Trish would be returning to the village, with the role recast to Welch. She has previously starred in three soaps, Coronation Street, Waterloo Road and EastEnders. Prior to accepting the role, she stated that she would not appear in a soap again, due to the heavy filming schedule and early wakeup times. However, when the casting directors informed her agent that the role of Trish "had Denise written all over it", she explained that it lured her in and that her inhibitions about being in a soap "went out of the window", adding that the role "was just too good an opportunity to pass up". After she began filming, Welch said that the "5am starts" had "been a shock to the system", but that waking up feeling excited about filming helped her to know she had made "the right decision". Welch described Trish as "quite camp", and noted that since Trish is a dance teacher, she "dresses like Olivia Newton-John in the "Physical" video", adding that Trish "loves a coloured headband and an orange legwarmer". Welch then complimented Trish's style, stating that she is more stylish than her. Welch described Trish's relationship with Maxine as "fractious", but stated that Maxine is "ultimately pleased to see Trish". She hinted that while their reunion scenes will initially have a "funny element", the storyline will "become much darker".

Trish departs on 4 January 2022, when she leaves the village for a fresh start in Los Angeles with Mitzeee.

== Lynsey Nolan ==
Lynsey Nolan, portrayed by Karen Hassan, first appeared on 11 August 2010, and is a nurse. Lynsey's main storylines involve her intense feud with serial killer Silas Blissett (Jeff Rawle), and having a relationship with Malachy Fisher (Glen Wallace), and her subsequent feud with Malachy's wife Mercedes (Jennifer Metcalfe). Lynsey was killed-off on 29 June 2012 in a "whodunit" storyline, with various suspects potentially being responsible for her murder. It was later revealed that Lynsey was murdered by Dr. Paul Browning (Joseph Thompson). Hassan has been nominated for numerous awards for her portrayal of Lynsey.

== Alistair Longford ==
Alistair Longford
- Hollyoaks character
- Portrayed by: Terence Harvey
- First appearance: 24 August 2010
- Last appearance: 24 September 2010
- Introduced by: Paul Marquess
In-universe information
- Occupation: Retired
- Mother: Blanche Longford
- Wife: Pamela Longford (until 2010); Cindy Cunningham (2010–2011)
- Sons: Teddy Longford
- Stepdaughters: Holly Cunningham (2010–2011)
- Granddaughters: India Longford; Texas Longford

Alistair Longford, played by Terence Harvey, was a wealthy pensioner and grandfather of Texas (Bianca Hendrickse-Spendlove) and India Longford (Beth Kingston) who first appears when he chokes on food at Il Gnosh. He is saved by Myra McQueen (Nicole Barber-Lane) using the Heimlich maneuver. Myra tells Alistair that Cindy Cunningham (Stephanie Waring) was responsible for saving him, not realising his reward. Believing Cindy was responsible, Alistair gives Cindy a handful of £50 notes. This leaves Myra feeling insolent and upset. Alistair and Cindy grow closer until they begin a relationship.

Alistair charms Cindy. However, after she realises that he is India's grandfather, she leaves. After this event, he visits India and Texas to discuss their allowance and Texas's spending issues. The next day, India tells Cindy that Alistair lives in Sandbanks, a highly upmarket area. Cindy then realises that Alistair is a millionaire and returns to him to try and rekindle their relationship. Just then, Alistair asks Cindy to marry him. Cindy is left gobsmacked and speechless. After numerous attempts to sabotage the wedding from his mother Blanche Longford (Georgina Hale), Alistair and Cindy marry and leave for their honeymoon.

Cindy returns to Hollyoaks on 9 March 2011 and explains that during their honeymoon in Switzerland, Alistair fell off a mountain in the Alps and died.

== Sinead O'Connor ==
Sinead O'Connor, played by Over the Rainbow contestant Stephanie Davis, made her first on-screen appearance on 1 September 2010. Davis casting was announced on 16 June 2010. She is the daughter of Rob O'Connor (Gary Cargill), stepdaughter of Diane (Alex Fletcher) and the sister of Finn (Connor Wilkinson). Sinead has been described as very mischievous and a "typical teenager".

== Finn O'Connor ==
Finn O'Connor, played by Connor Wilkinson, made his first on-screen appearance on 1 September 2010. Wilkinson's casting was announced on 16 June 2010. He is the son of Rob O'Connor (Gary Cargill), stepson of Diane (Alex Fletcher) and the brother of Sinead (Stephanie Davis). Finn left with his dad in September 2011 and is set to return to the soap in April 2013, played by Keith Rice.

== Diane O'Connor ==
Diane O'Connor, played by Alex Fletcher, made her first on-screen appearance on 1 September 2010. Fletcher's casting was announced on 16 June 2010. She is the wife of Rob O'Connor (Gary Cargill) and the stepmother of Sinead (Stephanie Davis) and Finn (Connor Wilkinson). Diane has been described as desperate for a child of her own.

== Rob O'Connor ==
Rob O'Connor
- Hollyoaks character
- Portrayed by: Gary Cargill
- Duration: 2010–2011, 2013
- First appearance: 1 September 2010
- Last appearance: 15 April 2013
- Introduced by: Paul Marquess (2010); Bryan Kirkwood (2013)
In-universe information
- Occupation: Headmaster
- Wife: Morag (backstory); Diane O'Connor (until 2011); Kath O'Connor (2012–present)
- Sons: Finn O'Connor
- Daughters: Sinead O'Connor; Olivia O'Connor
- Granddaughters: Bella Sharpe; Katy O'Connor; Hannah Hay-O'Connor

Rob O'Connor, played by Gary Cargill, is a character who arrived on 1 September 2010 along with the rest of his family. Rob and the O'Connor family move to Hollyoaks due to his new job as deputy headmaster. However, soon after, his daughter Sinead O'Connor (Stephanie Davis) knocks the headteacher unconscious with the water bucket trick. Rob is promoted to acting head. Rob's wife Diane O'Connor (Alex Fletcher) steals a baby from a hospital. With the help of Lynsey Nolan (Karen Hassan) and Sinead, Rob convinces Diane to give the baby back.

Amber Sharpe (Lydia Lloyd-Henry) becomes pregnant by his son Finn O'Connor (Connor Wilkinson), but starts to write in her diary saying that Rob is the father. Amber kisses Rob, which is seen by Eva Strong (Sheree Murphy). Eva then steals Amber's diary and threatens to blackmail him with it. Feeling sorry for Rob, Eva's daughter Anita Roy (Saira Choudhry) decides to give him the diary so he can dispose of it, but Anita is unaware that Eva had taken out the important pages. Anita takes Rob back to her flat to try find the missing pages, Eva returns home and finds Rob alone in the flat with Anita, Eva then calls the police and has Rob arrested. Sinead is devastated that he is arrested, and Diane informs Sinead that Rob started seeing her when she was his student. Diane also tells her that Sinead and Finn's real mother Morag Fairhurst (Lisa Coleman) is still alive. Sinead is furious with Rob for not telling her. Diane and Rob decide to split up and Rob plans to take Sinead and Finn away with him, but Sinead decides to stay with Diane, so Rob leaves on his own. Finn later goes to live with him.

In April 2013, Rob returns to Hollyoaks and reveals to Diane that Finn has run away from home and asks her if he has been in touch with her and Sinead. It is also revealed by Sinead and Finn, that Rob's girlfriend is called Kath, and that they have a daughter together recently born called Olivia.

On 9 April 2013, a reporter from Inside Soap revealed that Rob would return to Hollyoaks to reveal that Finn has gone missing.

== Jamil Fadel ==
Jamil Fadel
- Hollyoaks character
- Portrayed by: Sikander Malik
- Duration: 2010–2011
- First appearance: 13 September 2010
- Last appearance: 9 September 2011
- Introduced by: Paul Marquess
In-universe information
- Occupation: Student/radio presenter
- Brothers: Rashad Fadel

Jamil Fadel, played by Sikander Malik, arrived in September 2010 as part of the new students. Jamil is characterised as being "very nice". Jamil arrives in Hollyoaks along with Doug Carter (PJ Brennan) after their trip to France. He moves into Student Halls alongside Doug, Jem Costello (Helen Russell-Clark), Lee Hunter (Alex Carter), Leanne Holiday (Jessica Forrest), Kevin Smith (Cameron Crighton) and Darren Osborne (Ashley Taylor Dawson). Jamil soon asks Charlotte Lau (Amy Yamazaki) out on a date, but is embarrassed when he realises that she is a lesbian. After failed attempts with Charlotte, India Longford (Beth Kingston) sleeps with Jamil following their growing friendship. Meanwhile, Brendan Brady (Emmett J. Scanlan) steals goods from the halls in return for drugs which he gives to Doug. Later, Jamil is confronted by a woman. She is revealed to be Jamil's wife, Lanika Fadel (Sarah Patel). Jamil reveals that he and Lanika are however not legally married, as he fled on the wedding day. After talking, Lanika and Jamil agree to get married. However, he lies to his friends by saying it was an arranged marriage. Jamil and Lanika agree not to go through with the wedding. Jamil has a one-night stand with Mercedes Fisher (Jennifer Metcalfe) and is shocked when he discovers she may be HIV positive. He has a brief relationship with Texas Longford (Bianca Hendrickse-Spendlove) although she soon after ends it. Jamil and Lee are offered jobs as radio presenters from the college dean and they later hire nurse Lynsey Nolan (Karen Hassan) as the agony aunt for their show thus putting her in great danger as murderer Silas Blissett (Jeff Rawle) is not impressed with her advice.

In September, he has a go at his housemates for their selfish behaviour and soon, because of what he said, decides to leave his course and work for his brother. His housemates catch up with him, make amends and see him off.

Malik revealed via Twitter on 23 June that he was departing Hollyoaks after a year on screen, and departed the series on 9 September 2011.

== Doug Carter ==
Doug Carter, played by PJ Brennan initially appears in the programme's online spin-off series Hollyoaks: Freshers, before debuting in the main series in the episode airing 13 September 2010. He left on 17 September before returning on 13 January 2011, this time as a regular. He was introduced as an American character and one of the new student group for September 2011. His storylines have included drug dealing and a relationship with Jenny which ended in her murder at the hands of serial killer. Doug has been described as a fan favourite.

== Eileen Brady ==
Eileen Brady
- Hollyoaks character
- Portrayed by: Rachel Doherty
- Duration: 2010–2012
- First appearance: 27 September 2010
- Last appearance: 18 December 2012
- Created by: Paul Marquess
In-universe information
- Husband: Brendan Brady
- Sons: Declan Brady; Padraig Brady
- Daughters: Niamh Brady
- Nephews: Macca

Eileen Brady, played by Rachel Doherty, arrived on 27 September. She is the wife of Brendan Brady (Emmett J. Scanlan). She reveals that she and Brendan are separated as he cheated on her. Eileen pushes Brendan to give her money for their ill son, who needs an operation. After receiving the money, Malachy Fisher (Glen Wallace) informs her that Brendan's sister Cheryl (Bronagh Waugh) was mugged, and money was stolen, and that he suspects Brendan. Eileen returns to let Declan Brady (Jay Duffy) stay with Brendan whilst she is on holiday. She walks in on Brendan and Ste Hay (Kieron Richardson) having slept together. On 18 December 2012 Brendan arrives at a bus station to give Declan and Padraig £100 each but Eileen gives Brendan the money back and leaves with her sons.

== Arlo Davenport ==
Arlo Davenport
- Hollyoaks character
- Portrayed by: Travis Yates
- First appearance: 12 October 2010
- Last appearance: 14 December 2010
- Introduced by: Paul Marquess
In-universe information
- Family: Sharpe
- Father: Phil Sharpe
- Mother: Helen Davenport
- Stepmother: Gabby Sharpe
- Brothers: Tré Davenport
- Half-brothers: Taylor Sharpe
- Half-sisters: Amber Sharpe

Arlo Davenport, played by Travis Yates, arrived on 12 October 2010 and departed on 14 December. Yates' casting was announced the same time as his on-screen half-sister Amber Sharpe (Lydia Lloyd-Henry) he was initially listed for a regular contract. Arlo befriends Taylor Shape (Shaun Blackstock) and invites him over for dinner with his mother and brother. He is shocked to learn that Taylor's father turns out to be his father to and they become friends; however, when Taylor catches the eye of Sinead O'Connor (Stephanie Davis), he tells Taylor he never wants to see him again.

== Danny Houston ==
Danny Houston
- Hollyoaks character
- Portrayed by: Darren Day
- First appearance: 19 October 2010
- Last appearance: 28 December 2010
- Introduced by: Paul Marquess
In-universe information
- Occupation: Nightclub owner (2010)

Danny Houston, played by Darren Day, is a friend of Brendan Brady (Emmett J. Scanlan) and partner in ownership of club Chez Chez with Brendan's sister Cheryl Brady (Bronagh Waugh). He first appeared on 19 October 2010.

The character was first announced in September 2010, with London West End star Darren Day being cast in the role. It was revealed that Danny would appear in only one episode, returning later in the year. Of his casting and character, Day stated, "I've really enjoyed filming with Hollyoaks and I'm excited about coming back. Danny is the type of character any actor would kill to play and the part has been made even better as I'm working with great talent such as Claire, Emmett and Bronagh." He later spoke about the character in an interview with Digital Spy, "There is going to be no-one badder than Danny Houston – he's about as bad as it gets and is the epitome of a soap villain really. I've been told that some soap magazines are nicknaming him Dirty Dan! For me, that's really exciting."

Series producer Paul Marquess also described the character: "Danny Houston is a dangerous but very charming character who makes an aggressive impact in his first episodes. Darren plays the part brilliantly and I’m delighted that we're able to bring him back later this year." Scanlan mentioned Day was a "great addition to the cast".

Before he arrives on-screen, Danny is made a silent partner of Chez Chez with Cheryl. Carl Costello (Paul Opacic) tells Malachy Fisher (Glen Wallace) that he knows of Danny and warns him that he is potentially dangerous. Danny later accompanies Brendan and Jacqui McQueen (Claire Cooper) for lunch. After which, he asks to take Jacqui out. He offers to meet Jacqui numerous times and the pair start a relationship, annoying Rhys Ashworth (Andrew Moss). In Danny's first on-screen appearance, he arrives in Hollyoaks to visit Chez Chez. Danny becomes jealous of Jacqui and Rhys, and shouts at her, after which she angrily warns him not to talk to her as he did. He later catches Jacqui and Rhys kissing, before threatening them. Jacqui later dumps Danny and embarks on a relationship with Rhys. Danny swears he will make their lives hell.

Danny attends a poker game along with Brendan, Rhys and Jacqui and soon realises that Jacqui is cheating. Danny's thugs take Rhys and hang him upside down from a balcony. Danny tells Jacqui that she has 24 hours to pay him a sum of money or he will kill Rhys. However, Danny gives Jacqui another option, if she sleeps with Danny, he will wipe the debt and give her money she needs. Jacqui agrees to sleep with Danny, but she explains she loves Rhys. Danny decides to let Jacqui go. Danny reveals to Brendan he knows he is gay, and tells him he killed an old lover of Brendan's in the past. Brendan and Danny decide to kill Warren Fox (Jamie Lomas) after they find him in Chez Chez. Brendan, however, double crosses Danny and makes a deal with Warren. Warren and Brendan tell Danny to sign his half of Chez Chez to Brendan, to which he agrees. However, Danny threatens to reveal Brendan is gay and to kill his lover Ste Hay (Kieron Richardson). An angry Brendan lashes out and beats Danny with a hammer, which causes his death. Warren and Brendan then dump Danny's body in a river. On 18 March 2011, Ste goes fishing with Leah and Lucas at the river. When he thinks he has caught a fish, he reels his line in and discovers he has caught Danny's body at the end of his rod. Ste then calls the police.

== Liam McAllister ==
Liam McAllister
- Hollyoaks character
- Portrayed by: Chris Overton
- First appearance: 20 October 2010
- Last appearance: 30 November 2010
- Introduced by: Paul Marquess
- Spin-off appearances: Hollyoaks Later (2010)
In-universe information
- Brothers: Nathan McAllister

Liam McAllister, played by Chris Overton, first appeared 20 October 2010 as Jem Costello's (Helen Russell-Clark) ex-boyfriend. The character was mentioned several times before his appearance. Liam was a footballer, who went out with Jem. His football career ended after Jem's father Carl Costello (Paul Opacic) broke Liam's leg for going out with her.

Liam arrives in Hollyoaks, where he spies on Jem's brothers, Riley (Rob Norbury) and Seth (Miles Higson). Jem and Liam go on a date, and Jem explains why she left him. Liam then invites Riley and Seth to a cage fighting party, where Liam is fighting. At the party, Liam and older brother Nathan plot their revenge on the Costellos. At a house party later in the night, Liam drowns Seth in a Jacuzzi. However, he survives. Meanwhile, Riley is drugged. Nathan locks Seth and Riley in a cage and forces them to fight, as Carl is tied up by a noose. Seth and Riley reluctantly fight each other. However, Nathan's girlfriend Sami enters and frees them. Seth, Riley and Carl leave and run through woods. Liam and Nathan follow with a gun. They follow onto a rooftop and Nathan falls onto a spike, killing him, as Liam is arrested. Liam returns and rekindles his relationship with Jem, plotting to destroy Carl by getting Mitzeee (Rachel Shenton) to sleep with him. However, Liam cheats on Jem with Mitzeee.

== Fern ==
Fern
- Hollyoaks character
- Portrayed by: Amy Gavin
- Duration: 2010–2011
- First appearance: 25 October 2010
- Last appearance: 6 January 2011
- Introduced by: Paul Marquess
- Spin-off appearances: Hollyoaks Later

Fern, played by Amy Gavin, arrived on 25 October 2010 and appeared in Hollyoaks Later.

Fern discovers Jasmine Costello (Victoria Atkin) is transgender, and threatens to reveal the secret to her family after Jasmine rejects a kiss from Fern. Fern accidentally stabs Bart McQueen (Jonny Clarke) during a fight and frames Jasmine's alter-ego 'Jason'. Jasmine's brother Seth Costello (Miles Higson) asks Fern to go with him as his date to the school disco, to annoy Jasmine. Later, at the school disco, Fern provokes Jasmine further by threatening to reveal her secret, yet again, on the sound system, as she had a copy of the recording on CD. Fern uses this to blackmail Jasmine to expose her secret, but along with Bart, Jasmine reports her to the police, forcing her to tell the truth about Jason. Despite Jasmine's attempt to tell the whole family about it, Seth meets Fern where she tells him all about Jasmine being Jason. Fern appears a few weeks later, when she apologises and tells Bart and Jason that she will plead guilty at her trial but only if they say that Bart's stabbing was an accident. After a heart-to-heart with Fern, Jason tells her she should come out as lesbian.

== Kathleen-Angel McQueen ==
Kathleen-Angel McQueen
- Hollyoaks character
- Portrayed by: Nieve Grandison (2015–2016); Kiara Mellor (2021–2025); Naledi Rapotu (2026–present)
- Duration: 2010–2016, 2021–2022, 2024–present
- First appearance: 29 October 2010
- Introduced by: Paul Marquess (2010); Bryan Kirkwood (2021); Hannah Cheers and Angelo Abela (2024)
- Spin-off appearances: Hollyoaks Later (2010)
In-universe information
- Family: McQueen
- Father: Calvin Valentine
- Mother: Theresa McQueen
- Stepmother: Carmel McQueen
- Half-sisters: Myra-Pocahontas Savage-McQueen
- Children: Unborn baby
- Grandfathers: Leo Valentine; Billy Alexander
- Grandmothers: Kathleen McQueen; Diane Valentine
- Uncles: Sonny Valentine
- Aunts: Jacqui McQueen; Mercedes McQueen; Sasha Valentine; Lauren Valentine
- First cousins: Bobby Costello; Phoebe McQueen (adoptive)
- Other relatives: Carmel McQueen; John Paul McQueen; Michaela McQueen; Bart McQueen; Marlena McQueen; Myra McQueen; Porsche McQueen; Celine McQueen; Cleo McQueen; Breda McQueen; Goldie McQueen; Prince McQueen; Hunter McQueen

Kathleen-Angel Khloe McQueen is the daughter of Calvin Valentine (Ricky Whittle) and Theresa McQueen (Jorgie Porter), who is born on-screen in episode five of Hollyoaks Later, broadcast on 29 October 2010. Kathleen-Angel is a member of the Valentine and McQueen family.

Theresa began an affair with Calvin in late 2009, at the same time Calvin was having an affair with Theresa's half-sister Mercedes Fisher (Jennifer Metcalfe). In May 2010, Theresa discovered that she was pregnant. She shot Calvin on his wedding day to her cousin Carmel McQueen (Gemma Merna), and he died of his injuries. Carmel was prepared to turn Theresa into the police, until Carmel learned that Theresa was pregnant. Carmel then agreed to keep quiet, instead deciding to turn Theresa into the police after she had given birth.

Theresa went into labour in October 2010 whilst attending a party at the mansion of Liam (Chris Overton) and Nathan McAllister (Michael Misping). Theresa gave birth to a daughter, and Nancy Hayton (Jessica Fox) informed Carmel of the news. Carmel was prepared to turn Theresa into the police, but was again convinced to change her mind, telling Theresa that she wouldn't go to the police as long as Theresa lets her raise the baby as her own.

Carmel ended up losing the baby after Mercedes blackmailed her, threatening to have Carmel arrested for being an accessory to Calvin’s murder if she does not change her mind and let Theresa keep her daughter.

Carmel wanted the baby to be named Angel against Theresa's wishes. Theresa's mother, Kathleen McQueen (Alison Burrows), has Myra and Mercedes locked up upstairs to prevent them from interfering as she has her granddaughter christened as "Kathleen Khloe McQueen" to spite Carmel. Not long after, baby "Kathleen" is officially named Kathleen-Angel Khloe McQueen.

In February 2011, Theresa and Kathleen-Angel were kidnapped by Kyle Ryder (Neil Toon), seeking revenge for being imprisoned for Calvin's murder. Theresa managed to call Carmel and Ethan Scott (Craig Vye), and Warren Fox (Jamie Lomas) was also alerted. After Ethan failed to stop Kyle, Warren fatally shot Kyle, who fell down into in a lift shaft whilst holding Kathleen-Angel. Kathleen-Angel was rescued before the shaft fell.

Kathleen-Angel later took a turn for the worse in hospital and ended up being rushed into intensive care. She began to make a recovery and the doctor later decided to take out the breathing tube to see if Kathleen-Angel could breathe unaided, which she did.

In October 2014, Theresa gives birth to her daughter and Kathleen-Angel's half sister, Myra-Pocahontas Savage-McQueen, fathered by Dodger Savage (Danny Mac). In November 2014, after the McQueen train crash which killed Carmel, Kathleen-Angel is seen to be upset at the hospital after Theresa's cousin John Paul McQueen (James Sutton) tells her that Carmel has died.

In March 2016, Kathleen-Angel is seen talking to Theresa asking where they are going and Theresa smiles at her and tells her they are going home and she smiles back at her. She makes her last appearance in a taxi cab with Theresa and Myra-Pocahontas leaving the village and moving to Alicante.

In 2018, Theresa later informed Dodger's half-sister Liberty Savage (Jessamy Stoddart) that Dodger is now president of the United States.

In May 2021, Kathleen-Angel returns to the village after Theresa'a grandmother Nana McQueen (Diane Langton) picks her up from the airport. Theresa is delighted to see Kathleen-Angel and says she is the miracle she needs right now. Kathleen-Angel says she is aware that there is a lot going on, with John Paul in prison for the murder of his fiancé George Kiss (Callum Kerr), when in reality the killer is his father Sally St. Claire (Annie Wallace). Theresa says that her family will always be there for her.

In May 2021, it was announced that a ten-year-old Kathleen-Angel would be returning to Hollyoaks, with the role recast to Kiara Mellor. Speaking to Digital Spy about working with Mellor, Porter stated that she has "the best fun" with her despite only having filmed one scene with her, since children are allowed on set less frequently due to the impact of the COVID-19 pandemic on television. Porter added: "her attitude and her McQueen-ness is just spot on. I couldn't have asked for a better little actress."

In 2026, Kathleen-Angel would grow into a older teenager and experience love with Anthony Hutchinson, and also a current hidden pregnancy from him.

== Trev Costello ==
Trev Costello
- Hollyoaks character
- Portrayed by: Scott Neal
- First appearance: 5 November 2010
- Last appearance: 31 December 2010
- Introduced by: Paul Marquess
In-universe information
- Occupation: Interior designer
- Brothers: Carl Costello
- Wife: Tanya Costello
- Children: 3
- Nephews: Riley Costello; Seth Costello; Jason Costello
- Nieces: Jem Costello
- Other relatives: Bobby Costello; Phoenix Costello

Trev Costello (known as Alphonse), played by Scott Neal, first appears on 5 November 2010.

Trev introduces himself as a camp French interior designer named Alphonse. He redecorates the kitchen and living area of the Costellos' house in The Dog in the Pond. His nephew Seth Costello (Miles Higson) convinces Duncan Button (Dean Aspen) that Alphonse fancies him. He later appears when Cheryl Brady (Bronagh Waugh) hires him to redecorate Chez Chez at the SU Bar. Cheryl's brother Brendan Brady (Emmett J. Scanlan) is homophobic towards Alphonse and tries to attack him when Alphonse suggests Brendan is gay. Trev sleeps (still posing as Alphonse) with Cheryl. The day after his nephew Riley Costello (Rob Norbury) convinces him to come clean about who he really is to Cheryl. He reveals to Cheryl his name is Trev and is married with three kids.

When Cheryl invites Trev for a drink on New Year's Eve, he agrees. However, they kiss passionately until Trev realises his mistake and regrets it causing him to leave, leaving Cheryl heartbroken.

== Ethan Scott ==
Ethan Scott
- Hollyoaks character
- Portrayed by: Craig Vye
- Duration: 2010–2011
- First appearance: 8 December 2010
- Last appearance: 6 December 2011
- Introduced by: Paul Marquess
In-universe information
- Occupation: Detective constable (2010–2011)

Ethan Scott, played by Craig Vye, first appears on 8 December 2010 and makes his last appearance on 6 December 2011 when he hands himself in to the police following a hit-and-run accident. Vye said he enjoyed his time on the show but felt it was the right time to pursue other projects.

Ethan arrests and questions Warren Fox (Jamie Lomas), convinced he faked his own death. He goes to question Carmel Valentine (Gemma Merna), but instead talks to Carmel's cousin Theresa McQueen (Jorgie Porter). After he catches Kathleen McQueen (Alison Burrows) trying to use fake money, Ethan takes her to the McQueen's and asks Theresa if she wants to go with him for a drink. Theresa soon takes a shine to him, but when she meets a woman named Liberty Savage (Abi Phillips) at her school for enrollment, he appears at the school gates; waiting for Liberty. She then identifies him as her fiancé, leaving Theresa slightly heartbroken. Ethan continues to be suspicious of Theresa. Theresa and her daughter, Kathleen-Angel were kidnapped by Kyle Ryder (Neil Toon), Ethan and Kyle get in a fight which leads to Ethan falling down an elevator shaft breaking his leg. Theresa then tells Ethan that she killed Calvin Valentine (Ricky Whittle).

Theresa and Ethan grow closer and share many kisses, but try to avoid being seen by Liberty. When Liberty's family arrive, her brother, Will Savage (James Atherton) is set up on a date with Theresa by Liberty, and the two grow very close, much to Ethan's jealousy. However, Will discovers the two kissing and at a hotel room, assaults Ethan. Will soon tells Liberty about the kiss and Liberty dumps Ethan. He and Theresa continue their relationship, but also continues a new relationship with Liberty, and struggles to juggle the two. Theresa confronts Ethan after a text he meant to send to Liberty was sent to Theresa instead. He worms his way out of the problem though. Theresa still doesn't believe him though, so she seeks the help of Dodger – together they find out not only has Ethan been cheating on Theresa with Liberty, he's also cheated on Theresa with Rae Wilson (Alice Barlow).

Liberty, Rae and Theresa begin to play with Ethan's head; with Theresa telling him that she is pregnant with his baby, Rae telling him she has an STD and Liberty telling him she has told her brothers they are back together and have set a date for their wedding. Later, all three girls confront him and Ethan realises they know the truth. He tries to get out of it by telling them nobody is perfect, but they decide to get their revenge on him by gunging him and many of the residents enjoy watching him get pink gunge thrown all over him. The week after, Ethan tries to talk to Liberty but is warned off by Will. One night, Ethan decides to text while driving, and as a result, accidentally runs over Rob Edwards (David Atkins) and drives off. He enlists the help of Theresa who gets Warren to repair his car. Rob regains consciousness and Ethan questions him but attempts to blur his memory of the accident. He later threatens Theresa to keep quiet about what she knows.

Warren eventually tries blackmail Ethan into helping him murder Brendan Brady (Emmett J. Scanlan). However, he decides to surrender himself after Warren threatens to harm Liberty. Before turning himself in, he promises Theresa he will not say anything about Calvin's murder. He also reveals to her Warren's plan to kill Brendan, and that she should not trust him. Ethan was last seen confessing to the police on 8 December 2011.

== Liberty Savage ==
Liberty Savage is a fictional character from the British Channel 4 soap opera Hollyoaks, played by actress and singer-songwriter Abi Phillips. She made her first on-screen appearance on 10 December 2010. Phillips was approached by Hollyoaks producers after she submitted one of her songs to be played on the show. Following a strong response to the song, producers invited her to audition for the role of Liberty, in which she was successful. Liberty was introduced to Hollyoaks along with her fiancé, Ethan Scott (Craig Vye).

Her main storylines have been in the love triangle between Ethan, her and her best friend Theresa McQueen (Jorgie Porter). Phillips said that Ethan is in love with Liberty, but does not love her enough to marry her. On her arrival her on-screen family was introduced, her two brothers, Dodger (Danny Mac) and Will (James Atherton) and her father Dirk (David Kennedy). Liberty performed at T4 on the Beach, she performed as two people, as while Liberty got her big break, Phillips also performed her own solo material.

== Silas Blissett ==
Silas Blissett, played by Jeff Rawle, made his first on-screen appearance on 23 December 2010, before departing on 29 September 2022, as he was killed off.

== Melody Longford ==
Melody Longford
- Hollyoaks character
- Portrayed by: Sandy Hendrickse
- Duration: 2010–2011
- First appearance: 28 December 2010
- Last appearance: 3 February 2011
- Introduced by: Paul Marquess
In-universe information
- Occupation: Singer
- Husband: Teddy Longford
- Daughters: Texas Longford; India Longford

Melody Longford, played by Sandy Hendrickse, is India (Beth Kingston) and Texas Longford's (Bianca Hendrickse-Spendlove) mother. She made her first on-screen appearance on 28 December 2010.

When India is murdered and her body is uncovered, Texas tells Nancy Hayton (Jessica Fox) that Melody is arriving. Melody arrives in Hollyoaks village and asks Lee Hunter (Alex Carter) for directions. Lee recognises her and realises she was a famous singer in the 1980s. Lee takes Melody to Texas's flat and she signs an autograph for him. Texas and Melody are revealed not to have the closest mother daughter relationship, however they begin to bond over their grief of losing India and Melody leaves having built bridges with her daughter. Melody lost her other daughter Texas in May 2013, after she was murdered on her wedding day by her husband Will Savage (James Atherton). She was not able to make it to Texas's funeral.

== Other characters ==
Character	Date(s)	Actor	Circumstances
Jack Welsh	5–8 January 2010	Himself	The Liverpool-based artist appeared as himself when he examined Leila Roy's (Lena Kaur) artwork, and gave her a job in Paris.
Patrick	12 January 2010	Daniel Yarnold	A man who interviewed Loretta Jones (Melissa Walton) for an office job in the probation service. Former lap dancer Loretta did not inform him of her previous job, and was insulted when he revealed he had no intentions of giving her the job as he wanted to meet a lap dancer.
Dr. Ford	20 January 2010	Glen Cunningham	A doctor at the anorexia clinic, who weighed and assessed Hannah Ashworth (Emma Rigby), before releasing her.
Policeman	11 February 2010	Phil Jervis	A police officer who arrived to arrest Jamie (Finn Jones) for the stabbing of Blue. Jamie then stabbed Darren Osborne (Ashley Taylor Dawson) whilst trying to escape and was arrested.
Johnny	March 2010	Luca Hyde	Caroline's young son.
Steve	26 March 2010	Anthony Crank	A TV producer recording Duncan Button's (Dean Aspen) 16th birthday party. He also kisses Theresa McQueen (Jorgie Porter), but she slaps him and walks off.
Laura	19–22 April 2010	Laura Ainsworth	Laura first appeared dressed as a playboy bunny in The Dog in the Pond public house. She later slept with Charlotte Lau (Amy Yamazaki). Soon after, she slept with Zak Ramsey (Kent Riley), unaware that Charlotte was spying on her. She was not seen again.
Glen Turner	May 2010	Drew Horner	Calvin Valentine's (Ricky Whittle) former police colleague. Glen helps Calvin set up Gaz Bennett (Joel Goonan) for sending him death threats a few days before his death.
Molly Montgomery	17–23 May 2010	Sophie Isaacs	A host who appears at a murder mystery birthday surprise for India Longford (Beth Kingston). She becomes close to Charlotte Lau (Amy Yamazaki) and sleeps with her.
DI Andrews	25 May–16 July 2010	Maggie Norris	A police officer who investigates the murder of Calvin Valentine (Ricky Whittle) and charges Gaz Bennett (Joel Goonan) after finding him with the gun used to kill Calvin.
Dr. Julian Bashir	May–June 2010	Amerjit Deu	A doctor who tells Steph Dean (Carley Stenson) her cervical cancer was progressive, and that she would need to have an operation within days.
Adam	31 May – 26 July 2010	Vlach Ashton	Adam is a realtor who was once in a relationship with Loretta Jones (Melissa Walton). Loretta's boyfriend Jake Dean (Kevin Sacre) follows her to a meeting and finds Adam and Loretta arguing. Loretta tells Jake that Adam has been harassing her. Jake confronts Adam, who claims that Loretta is the one harassing him and is using Jake to make him jealous. He then takes a restraining out against her. Nancy Hayton (Jessica Fox) meets with Adam to find out the truth about Loretta, who is then sectioned.
Jensen Newton	21–25 June 2010	Unknown	The baby brother of Barry "Newt" Newton (Nico Mirallegro) who appears with his mother Shelly, who claims to have stopped her drug use because of Jensen. and leaves him with Newt when she goes for a job interview. Just as Newt, assuming Shelly has abandoned them, is about to run away with the baby, Shelly returns announcing she has found a job in Scotland. The reunited family then relocate. Shelly, Newt and Jensen move to Scotland.
Louis	4 August–3 December 2010	Des O'Malley	A 15-year-old cancer patient who Steph Dean (Carley Stenson) meets at radiotherapy. They both support each other and Louis films Steph's diaries of her battle with cervical cancer. Louis is given the all-clear and later appears at Steph's funeral.
Lanika	17 September–6 October 2010	Sarah Patel	The apparent wife of Jamil Fadel (Sikander Malik), who reveals he left her on their arranged wedding day. They eventually agree to go through with the marriage. On their wedding day, Lanika has second thoughts, and does not marry Jamil.
Blanche Longford	20 September–1 October 2010, 2 February 2011	Georgina Hale	Alistair Longford's (Terence Harvey) mother who arrives to stop his wedding to Cindy Hutchinson (Stephanie Waring). Blanche returns in February 2011 for great-granddaughter India Longford's (Beth Kingston) funeral.
Mark Rushton	23 September–25 October 2010	Daniel Gallagher	Jasmine Costello's (Victoria Atkin) friend whilst she is dressed as her alter-ego Jason. He later appears when Bart McQueen (Jonny Clarke) questions why he has Jasmine's mobile number. Eva Strong refers to him by his second name in 2010.
Vicar	24 September 2010	John Elkington	The vicar who marries Alistair Longford (Terence Harvey) and Cindy Hutchinson (Stephanie Waring).
Rashad Fadel	5–6 October 2010	Leon Jan	Jamil Fadel's (Sikander Malik) older brother, who arrives with Jamil's fiancée, Lanika, and persuades him to marry her. However, Lanika does not go through with it.
Helen Davenport	12 October–November 2010	Emma Vaudrey	The mother of Phil Sharpe's (Andonis Anthony) other two children, Arlo (Travis Yates) and Tré Davenport (Charlie Behan). Helen has secretly mothered a family by Phil, who has a family elsewhere. Helen discovers Phil's lies, and meets his other family.
Tré Davenport	12 October 2010	Charlie Behan	He is one of Phil Sharpe's (Andonis Anthony) secret sons and arrives when Taylor Sharpe (Shaun Blackstock) visits their house for dinner, after receiving an invite from Arlo Davenport (Travis Yates).
Logan Fairhurst	25 October – 1 November 2010	Thomas Sean Hughes	Logan is a police officer and is friends with Riley Costello (Rob Norbury). Logan meets Theresa McQueen (Jorgie Porter) at a cage fight and becomes attracted to her. Logan and Theresa grow close during a party at a footballer's house and eventually share a kiss. However, pregnant Theresa's waters break and she goes into labour. Logan arrives at hospital to see Theresa, but Theresa's cousin Jacqui McQueen (Claire Cooper) makes her send Logan away so we will never discover Theresa's murder of Calvin Valentine (Ricky Whittle).
Dale Greer	1 December 2010	Chris Geere	A soldier who appears in a flashback episode explaining how Warren Fox (Jamie Lomas) survived a fire at The Loft nightclub during May 2009. Homeless, Dale starts working for Warren. On the day of The Loft fire, Dale finds Warren trapped in the cellar and helps him get out. Realising everyone believes he is still in The Loft, Warren stabs Dale and places him in the cellar. Dale's body is later recovered and buried as Warren.
Ciara	16 December 2010	Cammie Stadage	A girl who believes Seth Costello (Miles Higson) is really his older brother Riley (Rob Norbury). They go joyriding and catch a car thief.
Cameron	23 December 2010	Cameron Moore	A man who India Longford (Beth Kingston) meets online on a dating website. He appears in dream sequences, when he and India agree to meet each other in person. It is later revealed that Cameron is not a real person, but is instead a middle aged man called Silas Blissett (Jeff Rawle), who murders India.
Lenny McLaverty	30 December 2010	Scott Ryan Vickers	An acquaintance of Kathleen McQueen (Alison Burrows) who she knows from prison. Kathleen trades sexual favours with Lenny so he will baptise her granddaughter, Kathleen-Angel.
