= Leanne Holiday =

- Hollyoaks character
- Portrayed by: Jessica Forrest
- Duration: 2010–2013
- First appearance: 10 September 2010
- Last appearance: 21 October 2013
- Introduced by: Paul Marquess
- Spin-off appearances: Hollyoaks: Freshers (2010); Hollyoaks: Chasing Rainbows (2012)
In-universe information
- Occupation: Student (2010–2013)
- Husband: Dennis Savage (2013)

Leanne Holiday is a fictional character from the British Channel 4 soap opera Hollyoaks and its Internet spin-off Hollyoaks: Freshers, played by Jessica Forrest. Forrest's casting was announced in July 2010 and she began filming her scenes in June. The actress originally commuted from Manchester to Liverpool for filming, before relocating there. Forrest was a drama and film studies student when she gained the role of Leanne. She made her first appearance in Hollyoaks: Freshers on 26 August 2010 before appearing in the main show. Leanne departed the show on 21 October 2013, when the character was killed off in an explosion as part of the show's eighteenth anniversary celebrations.

Leanne was the girlfriend of long-running character, Lee Hunter (Alex Carter), and was introduced when Carter returned to the show after a five-year absence. Leanne is described as a "gorgeous babe" who is bubbly and a "sexy, sassy blonde". She is really sensible but a bit naive and has her heart set on marriage and her education. Forrest said that there is an element of Leanne being a bunny boiler and she also has a loopy side. The actress revealed that Leanne is fun to play and so different from her. Leanne's storylines have mainly focused on her relationship with Lee. Lee ends their relationship, beginning a romance with Amy Barnes (Ashley Slanina-Davies) which causes Leanne to become obsessed with him. Leanne turns into a "real bunny boiler" and develops a rivalry with Amy, doing "terrible things" to her. Leanne becomes involved in a sham wedding to Doug but she goes on to marry Dennis in a non-legal wedding.

== Casting ==
Leanne is one of three new characters created for the Hollyoaks online spin-off Hollyoaks: Freshers who also appear in the main show, along with Jamil Fadel (Sikander Malik) and Doug Carter (PJ Brennan). Newcomer Jessica Forrest was cast in the role having previously studied drama and film studies at the University of Manchester. On joining the show, Forrest said: "I suppose I was quite scared. At first, I'd heard all this stuff about 'the industry', but I soon found out that Hollyoaks is a real team effort – and it's actually the least intimidating place that I've ever worked. Everyone is so approachable and so friendly – you walk down the corridor, and people are smiling at you!" Forrest also commented that now she is acting, she feels she is where she "belongs". The character and casting were announced 15 July 2010. Anna Shaffer originally auditioned for the role of Leanne, but she was later cast as Ruby Button. Hollyoaks: Freshers was created due to the success of spin-off Hollyoaks: The Morning After The Night Before in 2009. The shows executive producer, Lee Hardman, said "Hollyoaks: The Morning After The Night Before was a huge success for us and we hope to build on that success with Hollyoaks: Freshers, which will explore the concept of multi-layered storytelling - engaging the audience across multiple, digital platforms." Jody Smith, Channel 4's cross platform commissioner for drama, entertainment and comedy, added: "Freshers is an exciting new direction for Hollyoaks. We're introducing a batch of new characters with over 60 minutes of original online drama and social media, telling their back-stories and journey to Hollyoaks before they arrive on TV. It will be a fun, fast-moving adventure, featuring some cast favourites and many surprises along the way." Forrest began filming her scenes in June 2010. Forrest originally commuted from Manchester to Liverpool, where Hollyoaks is filmed, for the role. The actress later relocated to Liverpool.

== Development ==
=== Characterisation ===
Leanne is described as a "gorgeous babe" who is bubbly. Channel Five's Holy Soap website described her as a "sexy, sassy blonde". Channel 4 describe Leanne as "bright-eyed and bushy tailed". She is "really excited" about starting a new life. Forrest told The Clitheroe Advertiser and Times that Leanne is fun to play and so different from her. Leanne is "really sensible but a bit naive" and has her heart set on marriage and her education. Forrest explained to Digital Spy that there is an element of Leanne being a bunny boiler. Leanne has a loopy side where she is "quirky but quite funny with it". She is trendy and has a unique fashion sense. Forrest went shopping with the wardrobe department and was told to "go mental". Leanne's style is "the vintage, bohemian look". Some of her clothes come from Topshop.

=== Relationship with Lee Hunter ===
In March 2010, it was announced that the character of Lee Hunter would return to Hollyoaks after a five-year absence. Hollyoaks series producer, Paul Marquess, said that Lee would return with a new character, which was revealed to be Leanne. Leanne is Lee's new girlfriend. They are already an "established item" which Carter said was quite nice. Their relationship is established to viewers in Hollyoaks: Freshers, in which Leanne and Lee "provide the romantic element". Of their relationship, Carter said "It's good - Lee thinks he wears the trousers, but she's got them - it's one of those! It's great." Forrest called the relationship comical and opined that she and Carter have "good chemistry". Lee really wants to propose marriage to Leanne, but his plans fail to impress her. This makes Leanne upfront and impatient, but they eventually get engaged.

Leanne and Lee move to Hollyoaks village to study at Hollyoaks Community College. However, when they move to the village, their relationship starts to go wrong. Leanne kisses Doug Carter after she is called boring for being engaged to Lee. Forrest explained Leanne's storyline is all about being young and said it was "strange" having to kiss Brennan. Lee also strikes up a friendship with Amy Barnes and they kiss. This makes Leanne jealous because "she sees it and she doesn’t like it". Leanne and Lee are both having the same doubts about the seriousness of their relationship. Carter said that it could be the pressure of being in college with so many young, free and single people. In January 2011, Marquess told Digital Spy that Leanne would turn into a "real bunny boiler" and be involved in a serious storyline where she would do "terrible things" to Amy. The storyline developed naturally after the show's team liked Leanne being funny and they started "playing on that". Leanne becomes obsessed with Lee after he ends their relationship. Lee begins a relationship with Amy and Leanne develops a rivalry with her. Forrest said she enjoys Leanne's rivalry with Amy and that she and Slanina-Davies have "such a good laugh". Forrest said "We really go for it when we're doing the rivalry scenes on set. I love working with Ashley - she's ace."

=== Departure and death ===
It was announced as Hollyoaks celebrated its eighteenth anniversary that five characters would die as part of an explosion. An official image released on the show's tumblr page revealed that Leanne would be involved in the storyline and would be one of the characters who could potentially die. When the episodes aired, four characters initially died while both Leanne and Dodger Savage (Danny Mac) were left in a critical condition. The outcome of the storyline was not announced previous to its airing, which left viewers to "wonder which one of them won't make it through". In the following episodes, it was revealed to the audience that Leanne had a fatal brain injury. The character went on to marry Dennis in hospital before dying.

== Storylines ==
Leanne learns that she has passed her A-level examinations and is able to study at university. Leanne and her boyfriend, Lee Hunter (Alex Carter), plan to move to Hollyoaks village. Leanne and Lee go to a music festival. Leanne leaves after Lee tells her they have to work at the festival to stay for free. Lee takes Leanne to stay at a hotel where he plans to propose marriage. However, his attempts fail after Leanne is unimpressed by the hotel room and they leave. Leanne goes to the village alone when she thinks that Lee has ended their relationship. She calls Lee's best friend, Bombhead (Lee Otway), and explains that the incident was a misunderstanding. Bombhead asks Leanne if Lee has proposed yet, leaving her shocked. Lee propose to Leanne and she accepts.

Leanne overhears Jem Costello (Helen Russell-Clark) calling her boring and kisses Doug Carter (PJ Brennan). Leanne kisses Doug again after an argument with Lee. Lee admits that he kissed Amy Barnes (Ashley Slanina-Davies), but Leanne forgives him. Leanne notices Lee is spending time with Amy and she begins to organize their wedding. Lee realises he is in love with Amy and ends his relationship with Leanne. Amy is hospitalised after a fire and Leanne pretends to visit her. She returns and gives Lee a letter from Amy, which says Amy is ending their relationship. It transpires that Leanne wrote the letter. Leanne and Lee reconcile. Leanne admits that she kissed Doug and Lee forgives her. On Leanne and Lee's wedding day, Amy announces that she did not write the letter to Lee and reveals it was Leanne. Lee declares his love for Amy and refuses to marry Leanne, terminating their relationship.

Leanne changes her university course to be closer to Lee, but he avoids her. She sees a billboard of Amy and Lee's advertising campaign, leaving her angry. Leanne feigns an ankle injury and tells Lee that Amy attacked her. Leanne defaces the billboard and reports Amy to the police. Amy denies the attack and her statement is supported by a witness. Leanne goes to the filming of Lee and Amy's television advertisement at an indoor ski slope. Lee tells Leanne that he does not believe she was attacked and she pushes him down the ski slope. Lee and Amy begin a relationship. Leanne dates Jamil Fadel (Sikander Malik) to make Lee jealous. Leanne argues with Amy and throws herself down a set of stairs. She tells Lee and Jamil that Amy pushed her. Leanne reports Amy to the police and Amy is arrested for assault. Leanne presses charges against Amy. Leanne is happy to discover that Amy has ended her relationship with Lee. Leanne withdraws her statement against Amy, hoping to reconcile with Lee. Lee turns against Leanne after he realises that she was lying about the assault. Leanne moves in with Doug and Ethan Scott (Craig Vye) after completing the first year of university. She fails in her attempts to begin a relationship with various men, including Louis Souyaye, Danny Lawrence and Matt Gill. Leanne sleeps with Dennis Savage (Joe Tracini) at the start of 2013 and is shocked to wake up in bed with him. They later embark on a relationship and Dennis later takes a job overseas.

Dennis' cousin, Will Savage (James Atherton) frames Leanne for killing her friend, Texas Longford (Bianca Hendrickse-Spendlove), and she is charged and remanded in custody. When Dennis arrives back he is determined to get Leanne out of prison. Will's mother Anna Blake (Saskia Wickham) later takes the blame for killing Texas and Leanne is released. Dennis proposes to Leanne and she accepts. Leanne looks after Leah Barnes (Ela-May Demircan) and Lucas Hay (William Hall) whilst Lucas' father, Ste Hay (Kieron Richardson), goes to court. Leah overhears Leanne on the phone to Dennis telling him that Ste killed his mother Pauline Hay (Julie Hogarth). Leah runs away but is safely found.

Leanne finds out that Doug and Ste are leaving together so throws them a going away party. In the shop Leanne finds out that Dennis was paid to do a fake robbery for the McQueens and that Dennis gave her the ring of the late Myra McQueen (Nicole Barber-Lane). She later breaks up with Dennis and throws champagne in his face. Leanne decides to leave but then later sees in a book that Dennis had written 10 things he loves about her. Leanne then organizes a leaving party for Doug and Ste, who are planning to move away. A bomb that has accidentally been brought to the party, goes off, destroying the house. Dennis waits anxiously for news on his step-cousin Dodger (Danny Mac) and when a body is brought out, it is actually Leanne. In the ambulance Dennis and Leanne have a heart-to-heart and Leanne tells him that she wants to marry him after all and forgives him for the robbery. Leanne then stops breathing and is rushed quickly to hospital. Due to complications due to a head injury, Dennis tells her that he will marry her in hospital. Dennis and Leanne get married at the hospital. Leanne then passes away, a few hours after marrying Dennis, due to a bleed on the brain she suffered from the bomb blast.

== Reception ==
A poll ran on the official Hollyoaks website asked viewers which new student was their favourite. Leanne received the fewest votes, with only 432 (7.91%) people voting for her. Marquess said that Leanne "is fast becoming one of [his] favourite characters". The official Hollyoaks website ran a poll on who Lee should be with and 478 votes were cast, with 72.18% of viewers choosing Amy over Leanne. In 2011, Daniel Kilkelly of Digital Spy said that Leanne has proved to be one of "the most memorable of last year's batch of new characters". Inside Soap conducted a poll to find out which Hollyoaks character their readers wanted serial killer Silas Blissett (Jeff Rawle) to murder the most. Leanne came first with 57% of the vote. A writer from Western Mail said that the tricks that Leanne played on Lee were insane. A writer from Burnley Express called Leanne a "bubbly blonde". Hilarie Stelfox from Yorkshire Live called Leanne a "doomed teenager" and believed that her "final performance was dramatic, even by Hollyoaks' standards".
