= Lydia Lloyd-Henry =

English actress (born 1996)

- Born: 17 March 1996 (age 30); Manchester, England
- Occupation: Character actress
- Years active: 2010–present

Lydia Lloyd-Henry (born 17 March 1996) is an English actress. She was born in Manchester, England. She played Amber Sharpe in Hollyoaks.

== Hollyoaks ==
In January 2010, it was announced that Lucy Allan had stepped down from the position of series producer of Hollyoaks and that Paul Marquess had taken over the role. It was soon revealed that Marquess planned to give Hollyoaks a "shake up", changing the productions team and beginning a cast cull by axing three established characters. Stephanie Waring (who portrays Cindy Hutchinson) then revealed that all remaining cast members feared their character would be axed. One month later, Marquess announced his plans to axe a further eleven characters, who would leave at the end of their current contracts. Marquess later announced that he would introduce many "fantastic" new characters to replace those who were departing. In March 2010, it was announced that Marquess would introduce a new family due to the show. Speaking about the family Marquess stated: "We're particularly excited about the new family that will join the show in the summer -and guarantee they'll bring glitz, glamour and great stories to the Hollyoaks village!" The name of the family was later revealed to be Sharpe, a new mixed race family of four members.

On 12 April 2010, it was announced that Lloyd-Henry had been cast in Hollyoaks as Amber Sharpe the youngest child of the Sharpe family, and would be joined by mother Gabby (Phina Oruche), father Phil (Andonis Anthony) and brother Taylor (Shaun Blackstock). Of the families arrival, Marquess said: "We will meet Gabby Sharpe – and her teenage children Taylor and Amber – in dramatic circumstances. Their arrival in Hollyoaks will change the life of a much loved character forever." In an interview with Digital Spy, Phina Oruche spoke about Lloyd-Henry, commenting: "The actors that are playing them [Amber and Taylor] are both brilliant, the kids themselves are really energetic."

In December 2010, the Sharpe family were written out of Hollyoaks. The actors assumed they would be returning to the series in the new year, but in January 2011, it was announced that the family had been axed from Hollyoaks as their characters had not worked out as expected.
