= Jason Costello =

Fictional character from Hollyoaks

- Hollyoaks character
- Portrayed by: Victoria Atkin
- Duration: 2010–2011
- First appearance: 2 August 2010
- Last appearance: 1 December 2011
- Introduced by: Paul Marquess
- Spin-off appearances: Hollyoaks Later (2010)
In-universe information
- Occupation: Student
- Father: Carl Costello
- Mother: Heidi Costello
- Brothers: Riley Costello; Seth Costello
- Half-sisters: Jem Costello
- Grandfathers: Silas Blissett
- Grandmothers: Joan Blissett
- Uncles: Trev Costello
- Aunts: Wendy Blissett
- Nephews: Bobby Costello; Phoenix Costello
- Other relatives: Mitzeee Minniver; Trish Minniver; Maxine Minniver; Minnie Minniver

Jason Costello (previously Jasmine Costello) is a fictional character from the British Channel 4 soap opera Hollyoaks, played by Victoria Atkin. The character debuted on-screen during the episode airing on 2 August 2010 and was introduced by series producer Paul Marquess as a member of the yet to be established Costello family.

Jason is a transgender boy, and the first character in the soap opera to experience gender dysphoria. Originally introduced as Jasmine, the character eventually reveals that he wishes to be known as Jason, and legally changes his name. Jason's storyline prominently explores the secrecy and trials of his romantic relationship with Bart McQueen (Jonny Clarke), a straight character who originally developed an attraction to Jason as Jasmine. Jason departed from Hollyoaks on 1 December 2011.

== Character creation and casting ==
In January 2010, it was announced that Lucy Allan had stepped down from the position of series producer and that Paul Marquess had taken over the role. It was soon revealed that Marquess planned to give Hollyoaks a "shake up", and begin a cast cull. In April 2010 Marquess announced plans to introduce new family, the Costellos. Speaking about the new family Marquess stated "They're only one of three families. They're family number two. The thing about the Costellos is that The Dog has to be somewhere the audience wants to be. It's like when I did Brookside, the first thing I did was put Bev in the bar so you wanted to be in there.....I'm not saying the Costellos won't have serious stories but I think you'll want to be there. They're good-looking kids and the parents are good-looking and there's potential for energy and fun." The Costellos were a built on family to the already established Jem Costello (Helen Russell-Clark). Jasmine was introduced later than the rest of his family. On the 1 July 2010 it was announced actress Victoria Atkin had been hired to play the part.

In September 2011, it was announced that Atkin had decided to quit the programme in order to pursue other projects. Atkins departs the series on 30 November 2011.

== Gender dysphoria ==
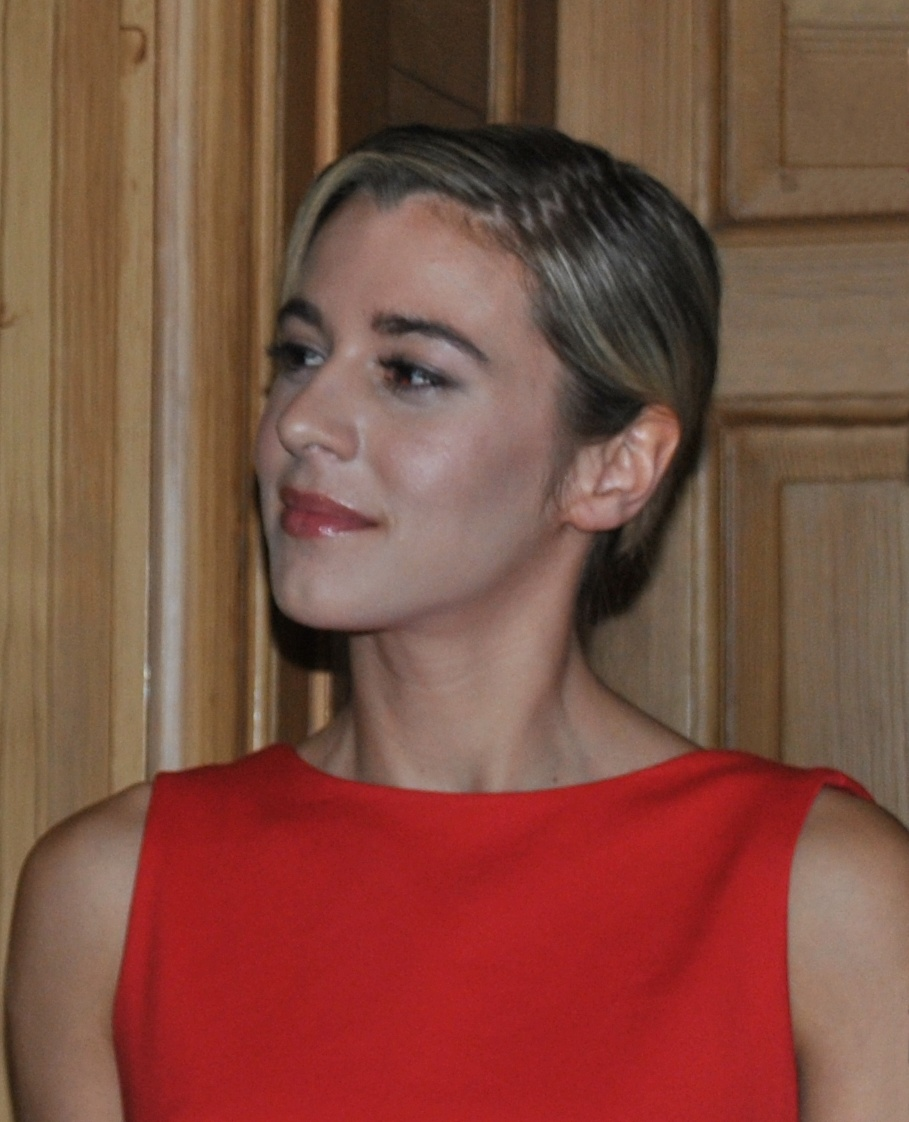
Atkin (pictured) met transgender teenagers as research for playing Jason.

When the character was announced, two pictures were released showing Victoria dressed as 'Jasmine' and true, male self, Jason Costello. It was also revealed that the character would be involved in a storyline highlighting the issue of gender dysphoria, which is defined as the feeling that one was born into the wrong gender. Of the character's creation, Digital Spy reported that "Jasmine's journey will highlight the mental trauma, physical disgust and ongoing frustration of a boy trapped in a girl's body, as well as the effects that [his] condition has on those around [him]. Atkin worked with transgender teenagers in order to perfect her part. One of the teenagers she worked the most with was Benson Bell, a seventeen-year-old transgender male. He helped advise Atkin on the performance of the storyline and was available on set for her. Atkin also revealed she had drawn inspiration from Hilary Swank's performance as Brandon Teena in the film Boys Don't Cry, but stated that the storyline would not progress in such a violent way. As research for the role she lived as a man in real life for one month.

Whilst interviewed by newspaper The Guardian Atkin admitted she had not known anything about transgender issues before taking the role and stated: "It was a big revelation for me how much taunting and bullying there is. The trauma and the effect on the family is huge. The impact on siblings at school, for example, came up with a lot of the people I have spoken to. They are often attacked, too." She also revealed that she finds some of the male attire hard to wear. Executive producer also claimed that the storyline was not aimed to be sensationalist or being used to increase viewing figure, stating he grew up knowing what isolation felt like and wanted to portray a story which mirrored a taboo subject that people would find hard to talk about to their peers.

== Storylines ==
Jason's appearance pre-transition period, whilst everyone knew him as Jasmine.

Jason is fifteen, twin brother of Seth Costello (Miles Higson), the younger brother of Riley Costello (Rob Norbury) and son of ex footballer Carl Costello (Paul Opacic) and ex model Heidi Costello (Kim Tiddy). When Jason first arrives he shows anger to his half sister Jem for running away from home in 2007. Jason is taken to Evissa by his mother for a makeover and he seems unhappy to be there, until he strikes up a friendship with Bart McQueen (Jonny Clarke).

Jason is first seen presenting as male when he joins in with some other boys who are adding graffiti to a wall. He is nearly caught by Carl but manages to run away. Jason spends a day with Bart however runs off after Bart kisses him. Jason decides to be with Bart to annoy his dad. He and a group of his new male friends decide to crash a party at the McQueen's house where he is presenting as male and kisses Anita Roy (Saira Choudhry). Anita pursues him, later finding out that Jason is female-assigned, but she persuades him to speak to her about it and we learn that Jason feels like he's a male in a girl's body. Sometime later, Bart tells him about stealing Jacqui McQueen's (Claire Cooper) money in a bid to impress him but is shot down by his disgust. He later comes round and they reconcile. Jason starts to be bullied by a girl in his class Fern (Amy Gavin). Fern catches Jason on a night and the pair seem to make up when Jason tells her all about his double life and Fern opens up to the fact that she is a lesbian. Things take a turn for the worse when Jason reveals that he still fancies boys and knocks back Fern's advances.

Fern blackmails Jason who turns to Bart for comfort. Jason and Bart begin to have sex. However, disgusted with his body, Jason runs off and self harms. In a frantic fight between Fern and Jason, Bart gets stabbed and ends up in hospital. Jason goes to see Bart who thinks Jason stabbed him and gets suspicious about "Jasmine" sticking up for Jason. Jason reveals that it's really him, just presenting as female, and Bart reacts badly. However, Jason comes back for him when he sees him being taunted by Fern. Fern steals Jason's clothes which are covered in Bart's blood as insurance. Following an argument with Bart, Jason comes out to Jem as transgender. Although Jem is accepting, she exclaims their dad won't be. Fern continues to blackmail Jason, dating Seth to taunt him. Bart and Jason resume their friendship and he encourages Jason to come out. Bart and Jason tell the police Fern stabbed Bart. Jason cuts his hair short and changes into his normal clothes, tells his family the truth and begins to live as Jason full-time.

Jason's mother tells him that she has booked him into a clinic; however, unknown to Jason, his mum's aim is to "cure" him rather than to help cope with his gender dysphoria. The clinic encourage him to be Jason, which annoys Heidi. At the school, Eva Strong (Sheree Murphy), edits a letter about him to the whole year. Jason becomes victimised and Bart joins in the bullying, however gains the support of Seth. Carl admits that he just wants Jason to be happy and agrees to stand by him. Seth is jealous of their bonding and writes nasty comments on the internet about Jason.

After an argument with Heidi - during which she shouted at Jason and tells him she would rather he was dead. Jason jumps in front of a car that Bart has stolen in a suicide attempt. He later wakes up in hospital and discovers that Bart was driving the car. After hearing Jason's reason for stepping in front of the car, Bart confronts Heidi Costello. She eventually apologises to Jason and tells him that she loves him, even using his preferred name rather than his birth name. Bart admits to Jason that he can't love him but they agree to be friends. When Jason and Seth turn 16 in February 2011, at their birthday party Jason tells Bart he loves him, but Bart reveals he is dating Sinead O'Connor (Stephanie Davis). Jason has a fight with Seth but instead of cutting himself, he vows to makes changes to his life. After Bart decides not to sit his exams, Jason helps him revise and Sinead becomes jealous.

Sinead sets Jason up on a date with a gay male Andy. The date does not work, but Bart becomes jealous. During an argument the pair almost kiss, however afterwards Bart threatens to ruin Jason's life if he tells anyone. Bart and Sinead run away from home after they are banned from seeing each other. Bart contacts Jason for financial help, he rushes to Bart's aid much to Sinead's annoyance. She attempts to rid of Jason as she can see the bond he has with Bart. When they break into a farmhouse for food, the property owner locks Jason and Bart in a cellar. Bart is injured in the incident and Jason worries he may not regain consciousness and declares his love for Bart. When Bart wakes up, they discuss their feelings and share a kiss. Sinead saves them but reveals she saw their kiss. She rips Jason's clothes off and degrades him for wearing chest bandages and tells him he will never be a real boy. Sinead dumps Bart as they return home.

Jason begins to rebel after Carl refuses to let him begin taking hormone blockers. Jason is arrested after he steals Ash Kane's (Holly Weston) and later buys unprescribed treatment via the internet. Carl stops Jason from taking them, but agrees to let him start the treatment at a later date. Jason's grandfather, Silas Blissett (Jeff Rawle), later murders Heidi and is arrested, letting the entire village know that he murdered the girls, not Brendan Brady (Emmett J. Scanlan). While grieving for his loss, Jason tells Bart that he needs to fight for Sinead. Jason and Bart travel to London in order to find Sinead. Bart tells Jason he is the reason he cannot admit his love for Sinead. They reveal to one another that they kept old text messages from while they were dating. Jason tells Bart to let go of Jasmine and win Sinead back. He also tells Bart that he loves him but needs to move on.

Carl returns trying to make it up to the boys. While Riley and Seth ignore Carl, Jason grows closer to him, then Carl announces that he wants to move to America and take him and Seth with him. At first Jason says no, then after thinking about it he says yes and tells Seth who does not take the news well. Jason then says an emotional farewell to Bart, Sinead and Tilly Evans (Lucy Dixon) and all his family. Bart wants to see him but Jason says that it is a permanent goodbye and that they will never meet again. Jason says that he wants to start again in America as if Jasmine never existed and he says "I will never forget you Bart McQueen". The next day they say goodbye to all their family and drive off to the airport and head to America. Jason made his last appearance on 1 December as Bart waved farewell.

== Reception ==
Atkin was nominated in the long-list category of "Best Actress" at the 2011 British Soap Awards. Jason's transgender storyline was nominated in the Radio Times Creative Diversity Network Soap Award.
