= Seth Costello =

Fictional character from Hollyoaks

- Hollyoaks character
- Portrayed by: Miles Higson
- Duration: 2010–2011, 2020–2021
- First appearance: Episode 2867; 20 July 2010
- Last appearance: Episode 5517; 2 February 2021
- Introduced by: Paul Marquess (2010); Bryan Kirkwood (2020)
- Spin-off appearances: Hollyoaks Later (2010–2011)
In-universe information
- Father: Carl Costello
- Mother: Heidi Costello
- Brothers: Riley Costello; Jason Costello
- Half-sisters: Jem Costello
- Grandfathers: Silas Blissett
- Uncles: Trev Costello
- Aunts: Wendy Blissett
- Nephews: Bobby Costello; Phoenix Costello
- Other relatives: Mitzeee Minniver; Trish Minniver; Maxine Minniver; Minnie Minniver

Seth Costello is a fictional character from the British television soap opera Hollyoaks, played by Miles Higson. He made his first appearance during the episode broadcast on 20 July 2010. His first major storyline was in 2011 when he was the centre of a steroids storyline. He also became involved in the storyline where his father Carl Costello (Paul Opacic) began an affair with Mercedes McQueen (Jennifer Metcalfe). 2020 saw the return of Seth, when he blackmailed the McQueen family with grandfather Silas Blissett (Jeff Rawle). He departed again on 2 February 2021.

== Character creation and development ==
On 12 April 2010, media entertainment website Digital Spy reported that a new family, the Costello's, would be introduced to Hollyoaks as part of the soap's ongoing rejuvenation. Newcomer Miles Higson was cast in the role of Seth Costello, the youngest son of ex-model Heidi (Kim Tiddy) and former footballer Carl Costello (Paul Opacic), the brother of Riley (Rob Norbury) and the twin brother of Jasmine (Victoria Atkin). Fifteen-year-old Seth was described as "desperate to prove himself to his parents" and "wants to step out of his brother's shadow". Of the castings, Hollyoaks series producer Paul Marquess stated: "We can't wait for this huge new boost of energy exploding on screen. These exciting new characters join our fantastic core cast. Together they will ensure that 2010 will be a year to remember on Hollyoaks."

Channel Five's soap opera reporting website Holy Soap described Seth as a "cocky schoolboy". Channel 4 describe him as "cocky and self-assured". He is determined not to be a sidekick, but cannot escape from Riley's shadow. Channel 4 also describe Seth as a "cheeky chap". Describing Seth's personality compared to his own in an interview with the official Hollyoaks website, Higson commented: "We're probably very similar. In the family, I'm meant to be the one that's not into football, and I'm not in real life, so that's been quite easy to do. Seth's quite vulnerable too and... well, I’m not. No, I am quite vulnerable too. He’s basically me, but just like a younger version of myself!"

In December 2011, it was announced that Higson had finished filming with Hollyoaks and that Seth's final scenes will air at the end of that year.

On 17 December 2020, it was confirmed that Higson had reprised the role as Seth, after he was seen in E4's first look episode. Seth was revealed to be working with his grandfather Silas Blissett (Jeff Rawle) and girlfriend Theresa McQueen (Jorgie Porter) to blackmail her family into giving them money. After the conclusion of the storyline which saw Theresa working with her family to get the money back, Seth left in scenes aired in February 2021.

== Storylines ==
Seth, mother Heidi, father Carl, brother Riley and twin sister Jasmine move to Chester after Carl purchases The Dog in the Pond public house. Seth becomes attracted to Sasha Valentine (Nathalie Emmanuel) and Jasmine takes a photo of her on Seth's mobile phone. Sasha tells Heidi and as punishment Seth cleans The Loft nightclub. Seth and Riley go to a cage fighting event after being invited by their half-sister Jem's (Helen Russell-Clark) ex-boyfriend Liam McAllister (Chris Overton) who plans to exact revenge on Carl for ending his football career. At the afterparty, Liam gets Seth drunk and attempts to drown him in the jacuzzi. Mitzeee (Rachel Shenton) discovers Seth and resuscitates him. Seth and Riley are kidnapped by Liam and his brother Nathan (Michael Bisping) and Carl arrives to free them. Carl is then tied up and Seth and Riley fight in order to save him. Seth, Riley and Carl escape and are chased by Liam and Nathan. Nathan follows Riley and Carl onto a rooftop, where he prepares to break Riley's leg. Seth pushes Nathan, who falls to his death. Seth begins dating Fern (Amy Gavin) who tells him that Jasmine has gender identity disorder. He is unsupportive towards Jasmine and is bullied at school because of her decision to take the persona of Jason. Seth joins Lee Hunter's (Alex Carter) boy band Guy Candy.

At Seth and Jason's joint birthday party, Seth gets kissed by Esther Bloom (Jazmine Franks). Later that night, Gaz Bennett (Joel Goonan) offers Seth dodgy steroids. Seth seems to be getting led down a dodgy path, as he buys more pills from Gaz. Jason overhears Seth buying dodgy pills from Gaz, but Seth seethes at his brother for trying to get involved. Later, Seth is working out when the strain becomes too much and he collapses. Seth is rushed to the hospital, while Jason tells Gaz to come clean about the steroids, but he warns he’ll be straight back in prison for dealing if he tells the truth.

Seth finds out that Carl is having an affair with Riley's fiancée, Mercedes McQueen (Jennifer Metcalfe). Carl tells Seth not to tell anyone he agrees not to but warns him if he catches them again he will. He later spots Carl and Mercedes hugging and gets the wrong idea they tell him it was just a hug but he doesn't believe them but doesn't tell anyone. He later has a go at Mercedes, unaware that Mitzeee is listening, who then becomes suspicious and informs her boyfriend Warren Fox (Jamie Lomas). Seth then leaves to go on Riley's stag do with Warren and Doug Carter (PJ Brennan). While on the stag do, Warren gets Seth a prostitute, so he can lose his virginity, in an attempt to get close to Seth in the hope that he will hear what secret he knows about Mercedes. He takes a pill and while having sex with the prostitute he begins to hallucinate and thinks he is having sex with Mercedes. He screams at her to get off and then falls asleep. When he wakes up, he finds the bed linen covered in blood, and the body of the prostitute outside, and presumes he has killed her. Warren then appears and sees what he had done and helps him get rid of the body and clean up the mess. Seth then starts to feel guilty for the murder and begins to see the ghost of the prostitute. He panics in front of Doug and ends up revealing Carl and Mercedes' affair to him. Seth considers suicide as the guilt becomes too much. Seth then tells Riley that he has killed the prostitute but Riley doesn't believe him, so he takes Riley to where the body is buried and he digs it up. However, when Riley unwraps the body, it is not the prostitute - but the body of a pig. It is revealed that Warren set Seth up and tricked him in to thinking he had killed the prostitute when on drugs, in an attempt to get close to Seth and discover what secret he knew. However Warren ends up finding out the truth from Doug as he threatens to let Riley drown unless Doug reveals his secret. Heidi is killed by her father Silas Blissett (Jeff Rawle), Seth's grandfather, by mistake and is later revealed he has killed many other women. Seth becomes aggressive within his grief.

Mercedes and Riley continue to fight over their son, Bobby. Seth tries to get them to reconcile, however this does not work. Riley soon gets a job offer in Leeds, however he says he's staying for Bobby. However, Mercedes says to Riley that he can have Bobby, but only if he leaves the town forever. Riley agrees. He soon rents the pub to Darren Osborne (Ashley Taylor Dawson) and on New Year's Eve, he and Seth leave the village.

Nine years later, Seth is revealed to be working with Silas to blackmail the McQueen family. It is revealed that Theresa McQueen (Jorgie Porter) is in a relationship with Seth, and is working with Seth and, unbeknownst to her, Silas to blackmail her family so they can get money to leave the country.

== Reception ==
Holy Soap describe Seth's most memorable moment as: "Having to clean the pub when Jasmine infiltrated The Loft and took a snap of Sasha, the object of his affections." A poll ran on the official Hollyoaks website asked viewers which member of the Costello family was their favourite. Seth received the most votes, with 532 (36.36%) people voting for him. Daniel Kilkelly from Digital Spy wrote that Seth was initially "mild-mannered" and "the quiet man of the [Costello] family", but added that he still was involved in "his fair share of Hollyoaks drama".
