= Gabby Sharpe =

Fictional character from Hollyoaks

- Hollyoaks character
- Portrayed by: Phina Oruche
- First appearance: 18 June 2010
- Last appearance: 17 December 2010
- Introduced by: Paul Marquess
In-universe information
- Occupation: Restaurant waitress (2010); Shopkeeper (2010)
- Family: Sharpe
- Husband: Phil Sharpe (until 2011)
- Sons: Taylor Sharpe
- Daughters: Amber Sharpe
- Granddaughters: Bella Sharpe

Gabby Sharpe is a fictional character from the British Channel 4 soap opera Hollyoaks, played by Phina Oruche. She made her first on-screen appearance on 18 June 2010, before departing on 17 December 2010.

== Character creation and casting ==
On 29 March 2010, media entertainment website Digital Spy reported that former Footballers' Wives actress Phina Oruche would join Hollyoaks as the mother of the soap's new four-member mixed race family as part of the soap's ongoing rejuvenation. Of the casting, a Hollyoaks source stated: "Paul [Marquess] [series producer] has a clear ambition for Hollyoaks - to make it as it's ever been. He really rated Phina during her time on Footballers' Wives, so knew she was right for the job of heading up the new clan." The family were given the name of Sharpe, who would arrive "in dramatic circumstances". In April 2010, Oruche's character was revealed to be Gabby Sharpe, the wife of Phil Sharpe (Andonis Anthony) and the mother of fifteen-year-old Taylor (Shaun Blackstock) and twelve-year-old Amber (Lydia Lloyd-Henry). Of the castings, Hollyoaks series producer Paul Marquess stated: "We can't wait for this huge new boost of energy exploding on screen. These exciting new characters join our fantastic core cast. Together they will ensure that 2010 will be a year to remember on Hollyoaks." Oruche was the first major signing of Marquess.

== Character development ==
=== Characterisation ===
Speaking to Digital Spy of her character, Oruche stated, "She wears her heart on her sleeve. She's a mum first and foremost and she's got her identity from being a mum. [...] She's a quiet person. [...] She's strong and she's way classier than I'll ever be!" Gabby is also portrayed as being "quiet". In the same interview, Oruche noted the differences between Gabby and her character Liberty Baker in Footballers Wives. She added: [...] "She's not lairy like Liberty, falling down stairs or falling out of cabs. She's the opposite. She's quiet but there's a few surprises in store. I'm a mum now and you never know what you'll do to protect your children or where your strength will come from until you test it. She's a ma!"

Channel 4 publicity describe Gabby as "strong yet nurturing" and make note of her ability to be "extremely tolerant", unless pushed to her breaking point. Channel Five's soap opera reporting website Holy Soap described her as being a gentle mum-of-two who is ready to make some big changes in her life."

== Storylines ==
Tony Hutchinson (Nick Pickard) decides to visit Wales to find a new house for his family, and meets Gabby for the first time. Gabby walks away from Tony and is knocked over by a passing car and falls unconscious. She goes to hospital and wakes up with Tony by her side. Gabby asks Tony to make sure her children are safe as her husband is away on business in Dubai. Gabby's children Amber and Taylor visit her and she asks Tony to look after them. Gabby confesses that she was leaving her husband as she was knocked over, and she was taking the children with her. Tony confronts Gabby and tells her she is wrong to run away from her husband, however she tells him that he does not know anything about her life. Gabby and Tony make up after he grows closer to her children. She plans to start a new life with Tony, but husband Phil arrives from his business trip. Gabby and Tony then walk away from each other's lives.

Gabby is not seen again until August 2010, when she and Phil go for a meal at il Gnosh restaurant. Gabby and Tony are delighted to see each other. Gabby argues with Phil as he continues to be abrupt with Tony. Gabby becomes upset as Phil gets angry and smashes a glass, causing him to walk out. Tony comforts Gabby and she explains she is unhappy. Gabby visits Tony again and Theresa McQueen (Jorgie Porter) takes her phone before she leaves. Gabby is shocked when she finds Tony at her home and he returns her phone. Gabby tells him she is going to leave Phil and asks Tony to help her. Gabby packs her suitcase and gathers Amber and Taylor's things. She prepares to leave as Phil arrives. Gabby opens the door and Phil sees the suitcases. Tony hides outside in the garden. Gabby tells Phil she is going on holiday and asks him to leave but he refuses. Phil becomes angry and grabs her, making Tony run into the house. Gabby moves away from Phil as Tony pushes him off her. Amber and Taylor arrive home and Gabby runs towards them and tells them their leaving. Gabby, Amber and Taylor leave the house with Tony. She arrives at Tony's flat and he tells her she can stay as long as she needs.

Gabby is shocked when Theresa tells her that Amber and Taylor have their suitcases with them. Gabby finds them at Relish with Phil. She tells Phil that he is not taking Amber and Taylor but he ignores her. Gabby threatens Phil and tells him she will reveal what has happened between them. Phil then leaves alone. Gabby tries to reason with Amber but she ignores her. Gabby meets Cindy Hutchinson (Stephanie Waring) at Cincerity boutique and they become friends. She goes to the charity fashion show and sees Cindy. Gabby invites Cindy to Tony's flat not realising she is Tony's wife. Tony arrives and Gabby asks him if he knows Cindy. Gabby is shocked when Cindy tells her that she is Tony's wife.

Gabby admits her feelings for Tony to Taylor, and he tells her to talk to Tony. Gabby tells Tony who also admits his feelings and they kiss. Amber sees them and tells Phil who punches Tony. Gabby tells him that they are not having an affair and threatens to tell Amber their secret. Later, Gabby buys Cincerity with Heidi Costello (Kim Tiddy). Gabby also becomes a school governor at Hollyoaks High School. Gabby brings Phil to Tony's for the night after picking him up from the police station for drink driving, leaving Tony unhappy. The next day, Taylor tells Gabby that Phil has another wife and two children, leaving her shocked. Phil visits Gabby and asks her to give their marriage a second chance, and Gabby tells him she knows about his other family. Gabby then tells Phil that she loves Tony, to the dismay of Amber.

Gabby grounds Amber for her behaviour and asks Amy Barnes (Ashley Slanina-Davies) to babysit. Gabby and Tony go to Heidi and Carl Costello's (Paul Opacic) reopening of The Dog in the Pond public house. They go home and see a fire in Il Gnosh and the upstairs flat. Gabby frantically screams for Amber who escapes onto the rooftop, however she slips but Tony rescues her. She later speaks to Frankie Osborne (Helen Pearson), who tells her that Amber stole a pregnancy test from Drive 'n' Buy shop. Gabby confronts Amber who tells her that the pregnancy test was for her and that she is pregnant. When Gabby goes to Taylor's football match, she meets Helen (Emma Vaudrey) and Arlo Davenport (Travis Yates) who are Phil's other family. They go for lunch and she discovers that Helen began a relationship with Phil first, but they did not marry. Gabby, Amber, Taylor and Tony move in with the O'Connor family following the fire. Amber agrees to let Diane O'Connor (Alexandra Fletcher) raise her baby after it is born. When Diane discovers that her stepson Finn (Connor Wilkinson) is the baby's father, she tells Gabby she cannot raise Amber's baby, leaving her angry. Gabby leaves Chester with Amber and Taylor to live at her father's house.

== Reception ==
Holy Soap describe Gabby's most memorable moment as being: "She arrived on the soap with a bang when she got hit by a car."
