= Amber Sharpe =

Fictional character from Hollyoaks

- Hollyoaks character
- Lydia Lloyd-Henry as Amber Sharpe (2010)
- Portrayed by: Lydia Lloyd-Henry (2010); Lauren Gabrielle-Thomas (2014)
- Duration: 2010, 2014
- First appearance: 21 June 2010
- Last appearance: 27 August 2014
- Introduced by: Paul Marquess (2010); Bryan Kirkwood (2014)
In-universe information
- Occupation: Student (2010)
- Family: Sharpe
- Father: Phil Sharpe
- Mother: Gabby Sharpe
- Brothers: Taylor Sharpe
- Half-brothers: Arlo Davenport; Tré Davenport
- Daughters: Bella Sharpe

Amber Sharpe is a fictional character from the Channel 4 soap opera Hollyoaks, played by Lydia Lloyd-Henry in 2010 and Lauren Gabrielle-Thomas in 2014. The character was introduced as a member of the new Sharpe family, as part of series producer Paul Marquess' rejuvenation of the serial in 2010. She made her first on-screen appearance on 21 June 2010. Amber's storylines have included sleeping with Finn O'Connor and subsequently discovering she is pregnant and giving birth to her daughter Bella.

In July 2014, it was announced that Amber would be returning to Hollyoaks for three episodes in late 2014, with the role recast to former Waterloo Road actress Lauren Gabrielle-Thomas.

== Character creation and casting ==
In January 2010, it was announced that Lucy Allan had stepped down from the position of series producer and that Paul Marquess had taken over the role. It was soon revealed that Marquess planned to give Hollyoaks a "shake up", changing the productions team and beginning a cast cull by axing three established characters. Stephanie Waring (who portrays Cindy Hutchinson) then revealed that all remaining cast members feared their character would be axed. One month later, Marquess announced his plans to axe a further eleven characters, who would leave at the end of their current contracts. Marquess later announced that he would introduce many "fantastic" new characters to replace those who were departing. In March 2010, it was announced that Marquess would introduce a new family due to the show. Speaking about the family Marquess stated: "We're particularly excited about the new family that will join the show in the summer -and guarantee they'll bring glitz, glamour and great stories to the Hollyoaks village!" The name of the family was later revealed to be Sharpe, a new mixed race family of four members.

On 12 April 2010, it was announced that soap newcomer Lydia Lloyd-Henry had been cast in Hollyoaks as youngest child Amber of the Sharpe family, and would be joined by mother Gabby (Phina Oruche), father Phil (Andonis Anthony) and brother Taylor (Shaun Blackstock). Of the families arrival, Marquess said: "We will meet Gabby Sharpe – and her teenage children Taylor and Amber – in dramatic circumstances. Their arrival in Hollyoaks will change the life of a much loved character forever." In an interview with Digital Spy, Phina Oruche spoke about Lloyd-Henry, commenting: "The actors that are playing them [Amber and Taylor] are both brilliant, the kids themselves are really energetic."

== Character development ==
=== Characterisation ===
Channel 4 publicity describe Amber as "a real live wire". She's a "spitfire" who questions everything and rarely takes no for an answer. Amber is incredibly driven and does all she can to get what she wants, despite her age.

=== Teen pregnancy ===
In September 2010, it was announced that Hollyoaks, teaming up with Channel 4 Education's Battlefront, would explore an underage sex storyline involving 12-year-old Amber and Finn O'Connor (Connor Wilkinson). It was also revealed that the storyline would lead to Amber's pregnancy. Explaining the storyline, series producer Marquess said: "Hollyoaks has long been credited for tackling difficult issues that affect young people in a sensitive and intelligent way. I am very proud that we are once again bringing to the forefront a subject for our young audience that many parents, politicians and schools struggle to address. The storyline very clearly communicates to the audience that Amber and Finn were not emotionally or physically ready to engage in any sexual activity. And make no mistake, there will be no fairytale ending for Amber; she is faced with the most difficult situation she could ever imagine." The idea for the storyline was conceptualised by Hollyoaks producers, when they heard about Abbie Louise Davies Battlefront campaign to encourage young people not to feel pressurised into sex. Lucy Willis, executive producer of Battlefront, added: "Battlefront gives young people an opportunity to run campaigns about subjects they feel passionately about. Abbie Louise’s campaign Where Is The Love tackles an incredibly important issue which affects many young people today, who feel huge peer pressure to have sex before they are ready, often without the help and advice of adequate sex education at school."

== Storylines ==
Amber first appears on 21 June 2010, when she receives a call from Tony Hutchinson (Nick Pickard) telling her that her mother Gabby has been in a car accident. Amber feels uncomfortable around Tony and believes he was the one who ran her mother down, before he tells her he had just seen the accident. Amber and brother Taylor are confused when they return home with Tony and their belongings are missing, not realising that Gabby had planned to take her children and run away while Phil was gone. Amber is next seen reluctantly leaving her house in Wales by order of her mother. They arrive in Hollyoaks to stay with Tony, much to Amber's disgust. In an attempt to return to her home, Amber gives Phil the address of Tony's house, resulting in him being confronted by Phil. Amber pleads to stay with Phil, but he does not allow it. Amber joins Hollyoaks High school and befriends Sinead O'Connor (Stephanie Davis). After they catch Tony and Gabby kissing, Amber calls Phil and tells him that Gabby and Tony are having an affair, with Sinead agreeing with her. Phil then punches Tony, but Gabby tells him they are not having an affair. After the argument, Amber tells Sinead that she won't give up until her parents are back together.

Taylor tells Amber that Phil has another family, but she refuses to believe him. Due to her family problems, Amber turns to Finn O'Connor (Connor Wilkinson) for support. They have sex and Amber tells Finn not to mention it to anyone. Later, Amber discovers she is pregnant and tells a shocked Finn. They talk as a fire breaks out at Il Gnosh, spreading to the upstairs flat. Amber tries to leave her bedroom and is trapped by the fire. She escapes onto the rooftop with Finn and slips as she tries to get to safety and Tony rescues her. Amber begs Finn not to tell anyone about her pregnancy, which he agrees. When Gabby talks to Frankie Osborne (Helen Pearson), she tells her that Amber stole a pregnancy test from Drive 'n' Buy. Gabby confronts Amber and she tells Gabby that the test was for her and that she is pregnant.

When Amber moves into the O'Connors' house following the fire, Diane O'Connor (Alexandra Fletcher) discovers she is pregnant and Amber is pregnant and is going to have an abortion. Diane comforts Amber and tells her that she does not have to have an abortion. The next day, Amber tells Gabby that she is going to keep the baby. Hollyoaks High School headmaster Rob O'Connor (Gary Cargill) finds out that Amber is pregnant and asks her to see a professional councillor, which she agrees. Diane then asks Amber if she could bring the baby up as her own, as she is unlikely conceive.

It is agreed that Diane will bring up the baby as her own however Amber grows close to Rob. Amber kisses Rob, however he pushes her away. The kiss is seen by Eva Strong (Sheree Murphy) who gets the wrong idea. Eventually Sinead and Diane find out about the kiss and suspect Rob is the father of Amber's baby. Amber admits the father is Finn. Due to all these events Diane decides she does not want Amber's baby. Amber leaves the village with her mum and brother. In July 2011 Finn receives a text from Amber, showing a picture of their daughter Bella. In 2013, Finn tries to track Amber and Bella down, only to discover that they have moved.

In August 2014, Amber returns to Hollyoaks with Bella so that Bella can know her father. However it is revealed that she is trying to con Finn out of his money to buy a house with her partner Dale. Diane discovers and pays the money so that Amber can leave Finn's life for good. She left Hollyoaks with Bella after getting the money she wanted, leaving Finn devastated. Five years later, Finn is paroled and he decides to visit Amber and their daughter after being stunned by the entire village including Sinead. However, Finn decides to be with her and their daughter Bella by the request of John Paul, Sally, Edward and Nancy.

== Reception ==
Holy Soap describe Amber's most memorable moment as being: "Lying to dad Phil about her mum's relationship with Tony." The official Hollyoaks website ran a poll asking viewers who their favourite member of the Sharpe family was. The results showed that Amber was their second favourite family member with 421 votes (33.68%).
