= Jem Costello =

Fictional character from Hollyoaks

- Hollyoaks character
- Portrayed by: Helen Russell-Clark
- First appearance: 5 March 2010
- Last appearance: 30 November 2010
- Introduced by: Lucy Allan
In-universe information
- Occupation: Barmaid (2010); Student (until 2010)
- Father: Carl Costello
- Stepmother: Heidi Costello (until 2011)
- Half-brothers: Seth Costello; Riley Costello; Jason Costello
- Uncles: Trev Costello
- Nephews: Bobby Costello; Phoenix Costello

Jem Costello is a fictional character from the British Channel 4 soap opera Hollyoaks, played by Helen Russell-Clark. She made her first on-screen appearance on 5 March 2010. It was later announced that Jem had been written out of the serial, and the character would leave in November 2010. Russell-Clark made her final appearance as Jem on 30 November 2010.

== Creation and casting ==
In December 2009, in an interview with entertainment website Digital Spy series producer Lucy Allan revealed that there would be a new female arriving in Hollyoaks who would be a threat to Steph Cunningham (Carley Stenson) and Cheryl Brady (Bronagh Waugh). The character of Jem Costello was created as the new love interest of already established character, Gilly Roach (Anthony Quinlan).

It was announced in early 2010 that Hollyoaks series producer Lucy Allan had cast television newcomer Helen Russell-Clark in the role of Jem having previously auditioned for the role of Rae Wilson. Russell-Clark was initially signed to a six-month contract.

In January 2010, it was announced that Lucy Allan had stepped down from the position of series producer and that Paul Marquess had taken over the role. It was soon revealed that Marquess planned to give Hollyoaks a "shake up", changing the productions team and beginning a cast cull by writing out established characters. In April 2010, it was announced that Marquess would introduce a second new family after the Sharpe clan, the Costello's consisting of mother Heidi (Kim Tiddy), father Carl (Paul Opacic), sons Riley (Rob Norbury) and Seth (Miles Higson) and daughter Jasmine (Victoria Atkin). It was later revealed that Jem would be a part of the Costello family after previously been given the surname by Lucy Allan. Jem transpired to be the daughter of Carl, the stepdaughter of Heidi and the half sister of Riley, Seth and Jasmine. Before her family arrived, Jem revealed her mother had died when she was young.

== Development ==
Speaking to OK! of her character, Russell-Clark stated, "Well, Jem’s well into her martial arts – as I am, which means you’ll be seeing lots of fight action. In fact, the first thing you really see of me is my hand hitting someone, but it’s all in self-defence!" In March 2010, in a video interview with Hollyoaks Backstage, Russell-Clark introduced her character and described her personality, she said, "Jem is a bit of a free spirit, she loves travelling, she loves anything like new experiences, big ideas, she's full of big ideas [...] She's quite feisty, she's really into her martial arts and keeping fit and stuff. She's quite honest with everyone." Carley Stenson, who portrays Gilly's love rival Steph Cunningham, described Gem as "everything you don't want your love rival to be – pretty, trendy, friendly... Steph struggles to hide her upset", and explained that Gilly really likes Gem, revealing, "He's so into her that he declares his love and proposes in front of everyone and she says 'Yes!'" Russell-Clark later left the soap and last appeared in November 2010.

== Storylines ==
Gilly Roach (Anthony Quinlan) decides to go travelling around the world with Zoe Carpenter (Zoë Lister) and Mike Barnes (Tony Hirst) after he gives up on his love for Steph. Gilly returns to the village with Jem whom he met in Thailand after he saved her from a shark attack. Jem is excited when Gilly proposes to her after he declares his love, much to the disappointment of Steph who runs off. Jem makes friends with Steph and another ex-girlfriend of Gilly, Cheryl and both of them try to make Jem and Gilly split up however they realised Jem was too nice for them to do anything else. Jem moves in with Gilly and the Ashworth family and formed a bond with Josh Ashworth (Sonny Flood) because of problems with his family. During her time with the family, Jem works in The Dog in the Pond and starts running a martial arts class teaching a lovestruck Duncan Button (Dean Aspen). Duncan tried to kiss Jem, but she retaliated using the exercise she taught him. Jem realised that Gilly was still in love with Steph, and called off their engagement, even after making an effort to befriend Steph.

Jem helps Anita Roy (Saira Choudhry) track down her birth mother, Eva Strong (Sheree Murphy), and moves in with Anita and her brother Ravi Roy (Stephen Uppal). Jem applies for a job at the SU Bar but India Longford (Beth Kingston) applies for the same job. Jem and India both try to persuade Charlotte Lau (Amy Yamazaki) to give them the job and after organising an event as part of the interview process with India gaining the job; however, they both later agree to share the job.

Jem and Ravi flirt and sleep together leaving Anita annoyed. Jem and Ravi go out for a drink where Jem meets her father Carl for the first time in three years. Carl tells Jem he is the new owner of the pub. Jem reunites with her step-mother Heidi and brothers Riley and Seth but refuses to talk to Carl after his numerous affairs. Jem starts to bond with Carl and they try to rebuild their relationship. When the family learns that Jasmine is seeing Bart McQueen (Jonny Clarke), Carl is furious and threatens him. Jem breaks up the confrontation and asks "What are you going to do, break his legs?" When she talks to Carl outside, she reveals that he broke the leg of her ex-boyfriend Liam McAllister (Chris Overton). Liam was also training to be a footballer like Carl, but he ruined Liam's career. Jem splits up with Ravi after finding out that he slept with Eva.

In September 2010, Jem decides to join Hollyoaks Community College, followed by Darren Osborne's (Ashley Taylor Dawson) decision to join as well. Jem is allocated a flat alongside the other fresher students. She kisses Doug Carter (PJ Brennan) to annoy Carl, which raises suspicion that he was responsible for attacking Doug later that day. Jem accused Carl of hitting Doug, but became aware of the absurdity of her allegations against him, and apologised to Carl. Jem then starts studying for her play which is graded on, helps Kevin Smith (Cameron Crighton) and Jamil Fadel (Sakinder Malik) through their problems. Liam later turns up in the village, she explains why she left him and they go on a few dates. Later when her brothers end up in danger after going to a party hosted by Liam and his brother Nathan, Heidi angrily blames Jem for allowing the boys to go and putting their lives at risk.

When Nathan dies Liam returns to the village seeking revenge on Carl. Later Jasmine tells Jem she wants to be a boy. Jem agrees to help Liam by paying Mitzeee (Rachel Shenton) to seduce Carl. Jem's plan backfires as Mitzeee sleeps with Liam and Heidi finds out what Jem's been up to. Jasmine Costello (Victoria Atkin) reveals to Jem that she is now Jason and she feels like she is a boy. Although Jem is accepting she exclaims their father won't be.

After an argument with Heidi, Jem decides she needs to leave. Finally making up with her father, she says a tearful goodbye to her family.
