= Libby Davison =

English actress (born 1966)

- Born: Elizabeth Davison; 22 August 1966 (age 59); Durham, England

Elizabeth "Libby" Davison (born 22 August 1966) is an English actress who is best known for playing DI Liz Rawton in The Bill from 1996 to 1999. She made her TV debut as Gloria, the fitness teacher in series 7 and 8 of Byker Grove (1995–6). She has also appeared in Our Friends in the North, Holby City, Doctors and The Royal Today. She joined Hollyoaks as Rose Townsend on 28 June 2010 in a recurring role. She left the show on 6 August 2010.

She has three children and lives in Newcastle upon Tyne.
