= Craig Vye =

English actor

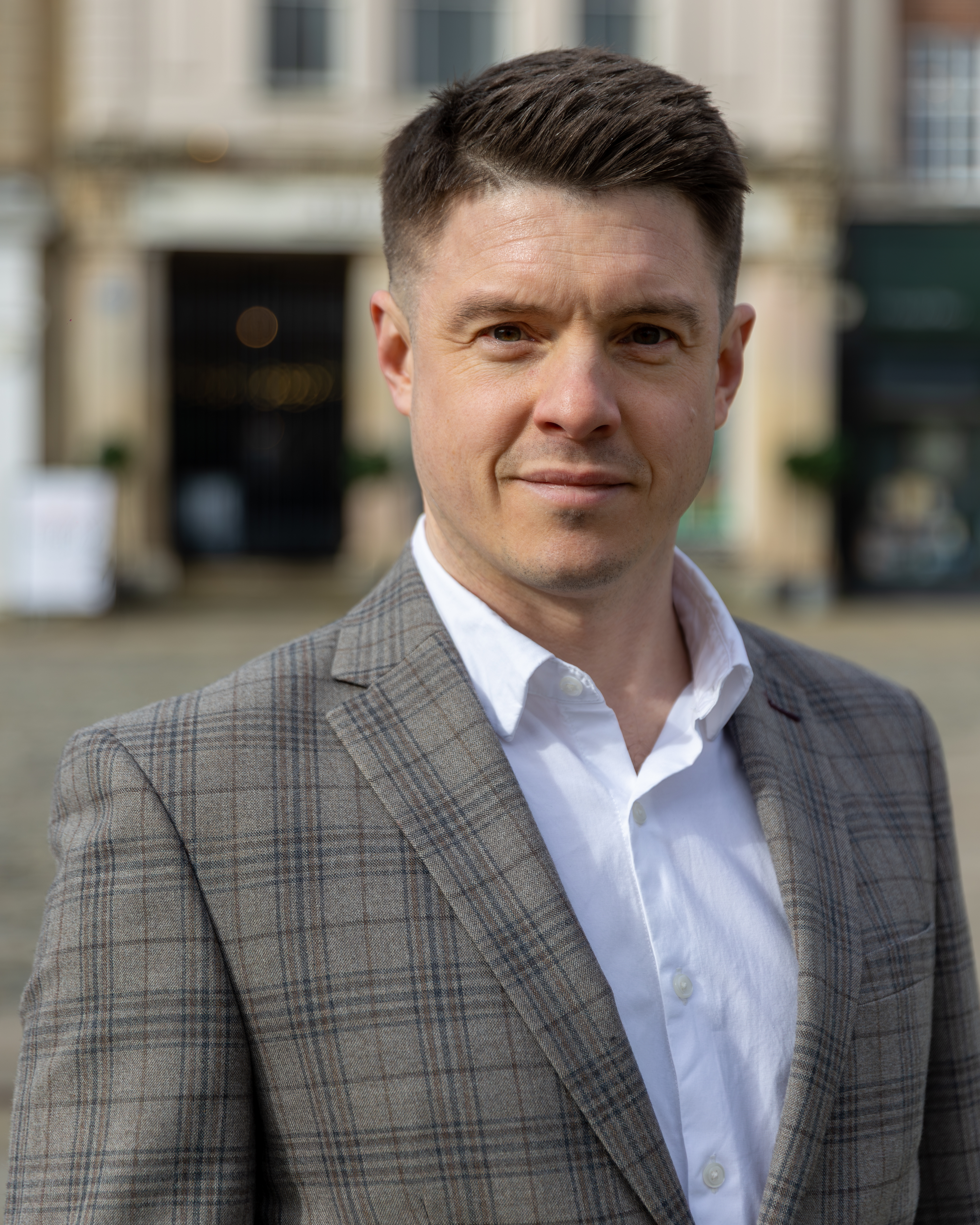
- Craig Vye 2026
- Born: Hertfordshire, England
- Education: Royal Academy of Dramatic Art (BA)
- Occupation: Actor
- Years active: 1996–present
- Website: www.vybrant.media

Craig Vye is an English actor of stage and screen. He is best known for his role as Ethan Scott in teen soap opera Hollyoaks (2010−11), and in 2016 played Dean in Emmerdale. Vye is co-founder and director of Vybrant Media.

== Early life and education ==
Craig Vye was born in Hertfordshire, England.

He trained at the Royal Academy of Dramatic Art in London, graduating in 2005.

Vye was a member of the Big Spirit Youth Theatre, starring in various roles such as Rosencrantz in Hamlet, Demetrius in A Midsummer Night's Dream, Eiliff in Mother Courage, Augustus in The Importance of Being Earnest, and Ralph in Lord of the Flies.

== Acting career ==
Vye played Ethan Scott in the teen soap opera Hollyoaks.

== Vybrant Media ==
Vye is co-founder of Vybrant Media, which produces commercial films for "brands, institutions and movements".

== Work ==
=== Theatre ===
Year	Title	Role	Venue
2006	Market Boy	Cupid / New Boy	Royal National Theatre
2006	To Kill A Mockingbird	Jem	West Yorkshire Playhouse
2008	Dr Korczak's Example	Adzio	Royal Exchange Theatre
2009	Dr Korczak's Example	Adzio	Arcola Theatre
2013	Romeo and Juliet	Romeo	Theatre Royal, Bury St Edmunds

=== Television ===
Year	Title	Role	Details
1996	Casualty	Simon Eddison	episode:Another Day in Paradise
1996	London's Burning	Young Macduff	1 episode
1997–1998	Aquila	Geoff Reynolds	2 series, main role
2000	Summer in the Suburbs	Guy	TV film
2002	Casualty	Anthony	episode: Past, Present, Future
2002	Doctors	Darryl Clarke	episode: A Game of Two Halves
2010	Doctors	Troy Plunkett	episode: Power of Speech
2010–11	Hollyoaks	Ethan Scott	TV series
2010	Misfits	Matt	Episode No.2.5
2012	Doctors	James Fenwick	episode: Matthew and Son
2016	Stan Lee's Lucky Man	Donato	episode: The Charm Offensive
2016	Emmerdale	Dean	5 episodes, 25 March-31 March, 23 August

=== Film ===
Title	Role	Release date
My Brother Tom|Gang Boy	2001	
Wicked Little Things	Tim	2006
Telstar: The Joe Meek Story	Mitch Mitchell	2008
The Elves and the Poomaker	Elf	2012

== Awards and nominations ==
Year	Award	Category	Result	Ref.
2011	The British Soap Awards	Sexiest Male	Nominated	
2011	TV Choice Awards	Best Soap Newcomer	Nominated	
