= Sikander Malik =

British actor (born 1985)

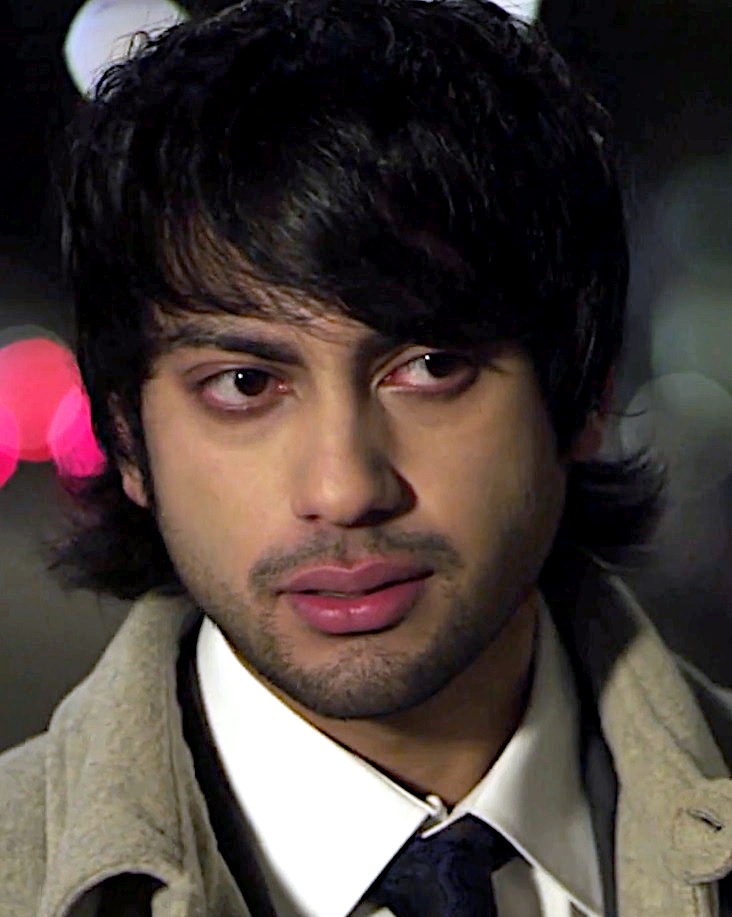
- Malik in Long Walk Home, 2012
- Born: Sikander Ali Malik; 16 December 1985 (age 40); Nottingham, England
- Occupation: Actor
- Website: http://www.sikandermalik.com

Sikander Ali Malik (born 16 December 1985) is a British actor, director and film producer who plays Asa (Acer) Anwar in the BBC One drama Doctors and is best known for portraying Jamil Fadel in the soap operas Hollyoaks, Hollyoaks Later and the online prequel Hollyoaks: Freshers.

== Career ==
Sikander has recently been filming for the BBC and was the guest lead in the BBC One drama Doctors. His character Asa (Acer) Anwar was introduced in the episode titled Desperately Seeking Melanie (aired 4 October 2012).

As well as appearing on television, Sikander has been busy filming for the lead role of Thomas in a new independent romantic comedy titled Long Walk Home and was shown at the National Gallery in London in 2012.

Sikander also appeared in the 2007 film Rocky Balboa directed by Sylvester Stallone.

== Charity work ==
Sikander regularly participates and is actively involved in aiding and spreading the word for many different causes and charitable organisations such as Save The Family, OXFAM, Zoe's Place Baby Hospice, and the NHS Blood and Transplant unit (NHSBT).

On 13 February 2012, Sikander was spearheading part of a campaign by the NHS Blood and Transplant Unit (NHSBT) to urge more members of the Black and Asian community to consider donating blood and organ donation.

Meeting and speaking with members of the public at Highcross Shopping Centre in Leicester, Sikander helped persuade more than 360 people to join the organ donor register: "There is a lack of Asian and black donors out there... and they're waiting much longer than anybody else for an organ transplant... if you're a patient from an ethnic background you need an organ from a similar a community, otherwise it could be rejected."

== Television and film credits ==
Year	Title	Role	Notes
2006	Rocky Balboa	Boxer	Extra
2010	Hollyoaks: Freshers	Jamil Fadel	Series 1
2010	Hollyoaks	Jamil Fadel	2010–2011
2010	Hollyoaks Later	Jamil Fadel	Series 3
2011	Hollyoaks Best Bits 2011	Jamil Fadel	(TV Movie)
2012	Doctors	Asa Anwar	2012—
2012	Long Walk Home (Short film)	Thomas	2012
