= Cameron Crighton =

British actor

- Born: 9 September 1992 (age 33); Greenock, Scotland, UK
- Occupation: Actor
- Years active: 2004–2010

Cameron Crighton (born 9 September 1992) is a British actor. He has had small guest parts on various television shows and portrayed Kevin Smith on Channel 4 soap opera Hollyoaks.

== Career ==
Crighton had small television and film roles in his early career, mainly on an episodic basis. In 2005 he appeared in an episode of Broken News as Calley Quin. In 2010 Crighton revealed he had done some work on the film Harry Potter and the Deathly Hallows. He was later cast in soap opera Hollyoaks as Kevin. Before Crighton's first scenes aired, his storyline was publicised by the media, who described it as an odd alien storyline. Crighton expressed his delight to be joining a show that was widely known and stated he it took ages to sink in. In 2024, Crighton launched a campaign to bring back traditional school games with view of a national 2025 Conkers championship.

== Filmography ==
Year	Film	Role	Notes
2004	Shadow Play	Nathan	4 episodes
2005	Broken News	Calley Quinn	1 episode: "Missing Island" (1.02)
2005	The New Worst Witch	Wishbone	1 episode: "Trick or Treat" (1.05)
2006	Sixty Six	Captain	Film
2007	Constructing Australia	Mr. Head	1 episode: "Wire Through the Heart" (1.03)
2010	Harry Potter and the Deathly Hallows	Unknown	Film (post-production)
2010	Hollyoaks	Kevin Smith	Regular role July–November 2010
