= Connor Wilkinson =

English actor (born 1996)

- Born: 31 October 1996 (age 29); Liverpool, England
- Occupation: Actor
- Years active: 2010–present

Connor Wilkinson (born 31 October 1996) is an English actor. In 2010, he was cast in the regular role of Finn O'Connor in the Channel 4 soap opera Hollyoaks, and appeared from 1 September 2010 to 19 September 2011.

== Early career ==
Just before getting the part on Hollyoaks, Connor spent time in Belgium and Scotland filming a pilot for a children’s movie based on the Ulysses Moore fantasy book series. Also, he spent time going to ABD drama school every Saturday.

== Hollyoaks ==
In January 2010, Hollyoaks series producer Lucy Allan quit her role and was replaced by Paul Marquess, who immediately began a revamp of the series. Several characters were axed and new signings were revealed. The O'Connor family were the third new family to be announced, with former Brookside actress Alexandra Fletcher being cast as the stepmother of the Liverpudlian family. Marquess commented on the family: "We're very excited about the arrival of the O'Connors who burst onto screens in August with a very dramatic storyline. And I'm personally very excited to work with the fantastic Alex Fletcher again."

After Finn's arrival, it was announced that he and Amber Sharpe would be involved in an underage sex storyline. Hollyoaks, teaming up with Channel 4 Education's Battlefront web series would explore sex involving two 12-year-olds, which would lead to Amber's pregnancy.

Wlkinson said of the story "I play the youngest of the O’Connor family and almost immediately Finn landed himself in trouble! It was fantastic to be involved in such a strong storyline right from the start."

The character last appeared on 19 September 2011, however his departure was only announced in August 2012 by series producer Emma Smithwick.

Wilkinson appeared at the Liverpool Empire Theatre where he played Lyle in the musical Footloose and a supporting T-Bird in Grease.
