= Ashley Slanina-Davies =

English actress (b. 1989)

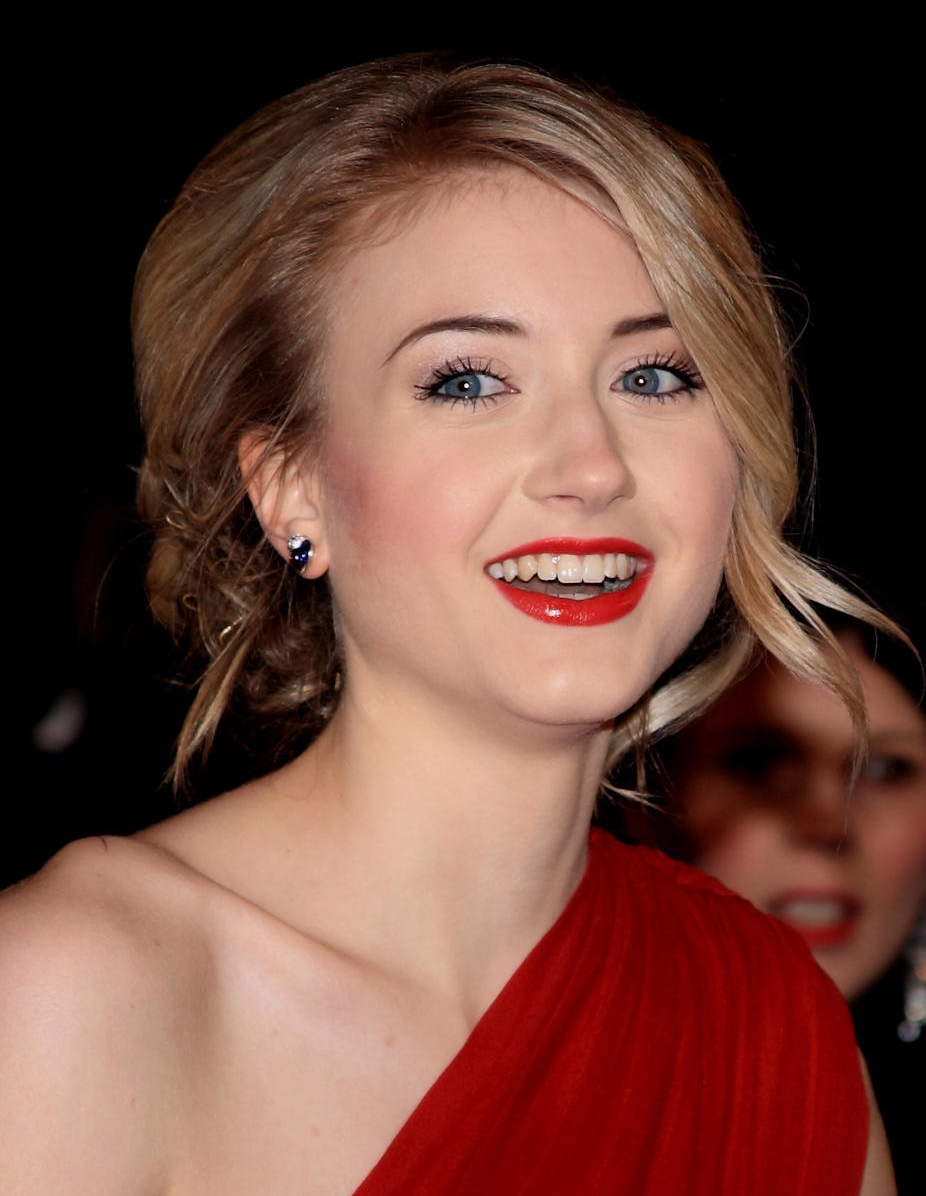
- Slanina-Davies at the 16th National Television Awards (2011)
- Born: 18 December 1989 (age 36); Standish, Greater Manchester, England
- Other name: Ashley Davies
- Occupation: Actress
- Years active: 2005–present
- Known for: Role of Amy Barnes in Hollyoaks

Ashley Slanina-Davies (born 18 December 1989) is an English actress. She is known for her debut role as Amy Barnes in the Channel 4 soap opera Hollyoaks (2005–2014; 2016–2017).

== Early life and education ==
Slanina-Davies was born in Standish, near Wigan. After leaving Hollyoaks in 2014, instead of auditioning for new roles, she decided to study neuroscience at University College London (UCL). She was in the midst of her five-year degree when she returned to the soap in 2016.

== Career ==
Slanina-Davies' Hollyoaks character Amy Barnes developed in a number of storylines in Autumn 2006, which saw the character discover she had become pregnant and her family break up. Dealing with these issues saw the character act erratically, becoming involved in a car crash. Her character was written out of Hollyoaks in the episode broadcast on 8 August 2012, when she decides to take up a full-time course in Manchester.

In May 2016, it was announced that Slanina-Davies would be returning to Hollyoaks on a full-time basis later in the year.

In January 2017, Digital Spy reported that Slanina-Davies' character Amy was being killed off in a "devastating" and "dark" storyline that Hollyoaks will air in late March. Slanina-Davies continued to appear in flashbacks throughout the storyline of Amy's murder and last appeared on screen on 8 September 2017 when an unknown assailant seemingly killed her.

== Personal life ==
Slanina-Davies is interested in charity work, and has contributed to fundraising activities for the Action for Blind People charity as well as abseiling down the Printworks building in Manchester in June 2006. Slanina-Davies stated that she was motivated by the fact that her "mum's partially sighted".

In May 2008, Slanina-Davies had her hair cut short for a storyline in Hollyoaks, while also raising money for cancer charity CLIC Sargent. The haircut was part of a domestic violence storyline involving Ashley's character, Amy, and her abusive boyfriend Ste Hay, played by Kieron Richardson.

== Filmography ==
=== Television ===
Year	Title	Role	Notes
2005–2014, 2016–2017	Hollyoaks	Amy Barnes	Series regular
2008	Hollyoaks Later	Amy Barnes	4 episodes
2010	Dancing On Ice	Herself	1 episode
