= Rob Norbury =

British actor

Rob Norbury is a British actor most popular for portraying Donnie Briscoe in CBBC drama Grange Hill, Riley Costello in the Channel 4 soap opera Hollyoaks and Leon in Emmerdale.

Norbury grew up in Oldham. Norbury is involved in the restaurant business, opening a restaurant called Muse in Uppermill and taking over a pub called The Farrars Arms in Grasscroft.

== Awards and nominations ==
Year	Award	Category	Result	Ref.
2011	The British Soap Awards	Sexiest Male	Nominated	
2011	Inside Soap Awards	Sexiest Male	Nominated	
2013	All About Soap Awards	Best Death	Nominated	
