= Phina Oruche =

British actress (born 1969)

- Born: Phina Adannaya N. Oruche; 31 August 1969 (age 56); Liverpool, England
- Occupations: actress, radio host/presenter
- Years active: 1995-present

Phina Adannaya N. Oruche (born 31 August 1969) is a British-Nigerian actress, radio presenter and former model. She is best known for her performance as Liberty Baker in the ITV series Footballers' Wives, for which she won a Screen Nations Award for Favourite TV Star.

== Early life ==
Oruche was born in Liverpool, England, to Nigerian parents of Igbo descent.

== Early career ==
Oruche began her career as a fashion model. In London before she emigrated to New York City. She represented Gap for five years in the United States, and was featured as a cover model on several American magazines. She had a special relationship with Essence magazine and was often featured on its pages and on a cover. She was discovered for the TV screen by British film director Tony Kaye, who featured her in many of his TV commercials, giving rise to her continued desire to act professionally.

== Acting ==
Currently on screen as Sarah Linlaker on BBC1 drama “Casualty”. In July 2025 she appeared in “Unforgivable” in the cameo role of Jodie Taylor. Oruche starred as Briony Mokusu in “Magpie Murders” and has appeared in many collaborations with LA Productions, as Sheryl Mulberry in “Moving On”, and Aunt Venn in poignant BBC1 drama “Anthony” directed by Terry McDonaugh and simultaneously starred as Marvellous in BBC's “ Taken Down” directed by BAFTA-winning David Caffrey for Spiral pictures. Oruche started her acting career in the US after an education in the Actors Studio in Los Angeles. She is best known for her role as Liberty Baker in Footballers' Wives, for which she won a Screen Nations award. She has appeared in various American and British television shows including The Bill, Nip/Tuck, Charmed, Buffy the Vampire Slayer, Diagnosis Murder, NYPD Blue and The Unit. Her film credits include The Forsaken (2001) and Happy Ever Afters (2009).

She made a cameo appearance in a January 2008 episode of the British sketch comedy show Little Miss Jocelyn.

On 29 March 2010, it was revealed she had been cast to play Gabby Sharpe, the mother of a new family, in teen soap Hollyoaks.

On 1 November 2012 she made a return to television on the BBC1 drama Doctors, before taking ten years off to focus on raising her son.

== Other television appearances ==
In 2012 she featured as the celebrity bedtime story reader, reading a story a day for children during the week of the Queen's Diamond Jubilee. Oruche also featured as a special correspondent on North West Tonight, reporting on the 30-year anniversary of the Toxteth riots.

In Dublin, Oruche presented a show three days a week on Ireland AM for TV3 and in London as a continued regular panellist on the morning discussion programme The Wright Stuff she was "Babe in the Booth" for the week starting 29 April 2008, when she was 36 weeks pregnant.

Oruche lives in her native Liverpool, where she has presented and produced the Saturday-night radio programme Upfront on BBC Radio Merseyside. She has produced and hosted six Upfront Live shows for BBC Merseyside in Liverpool, at The Brink a non-alcoholic bar in Liverpool that she supports. Local singers such as Kof, Chelcee Grimes, Mic Lowry, Chi Temu and Jamie Broad performed on the show.

== Identity Crisis ==
Her one-woman Identity Crisis, based on her own life story, received its debut at the Edinburgh Festival Fringe in 2016. Identity Crisis was filmed before a live audience in the Everyman theatre in Liverpool in 2026 subsequently playing in 2017 at the International Slavery Museum in Liverpool, before its first London run at the Kennington Ovalhouse. Identity Crisis finished its run in Soho Playhouse NYC.

== Other professional activities ==
Oruche hosted Merseyside Black History Month Achievers Awards at St George's, Hall Liverpool, and a MOBO music panel, featuring local artists Eddie Amoo of The Real Thing, and Kof.

A published writer, her children's book series “Jacopo Jacopo Football Star” and “Jacopo Jacopo on Lockdown” about a 10-year-old mixed heritage boy from Liverpool and his quest to become a premier league football player, are both on Amazon both published in 2020 during the COVID-19 lockdown. Oruche had a weekly column in the Liverpool Echo. Her autobiography Liberating Character was published in April 2012.

She also has a film company called Ibo Girl Productions, for which she directs, edits and produces digital shorts and videos.
