= Kim Tiddy =

English actress

- Born: 3 September 1977 (age 48); Surrey, England
- Education: Arden School of Theatre
- Occupation: Actor
- Television: The Bill; Hollyoaks
- Children: 2

Kimberley Jane Tiddy (born 3 September 1977) is an English actress, known for her roles as PC Honey Harman in the ITV procedural drama The Bill and Heidi Costello in the Channel 4 soap opera Hollyoaks.

== Life and career ==
The daughter of John Tiddy and his wife Roza Raymond, Tiddy was born in 1977 in Kingston-upon-Thames, Surrey, and brought up in Surbiton, Greater London, by her mother after her father left. She trained at the Arden School of Theatre in Manchester, afterwards acting at Salisbury Playhouse. Later, she set up a cleaning company and for two years undertook unpaid short film work. After working in Spain for one summer she returned to England, receiving an offer of a role on The Bill; her last appearance on The Bill was on 25 January 2007, when her character, Honey Harman, was killed off. In April 2010, it was announced that Tiddy had joined the cast of Channel 4 soap Hollyoaks as Heidi Costello; she left the soap on 31 October 2011 after her character, Heidi Costello, was also killed off. In 2016, she appeared in an episode of the BBC soap opera Doctors.
