= The Dog in the Pond =

Fictional public house in Hollyoaks

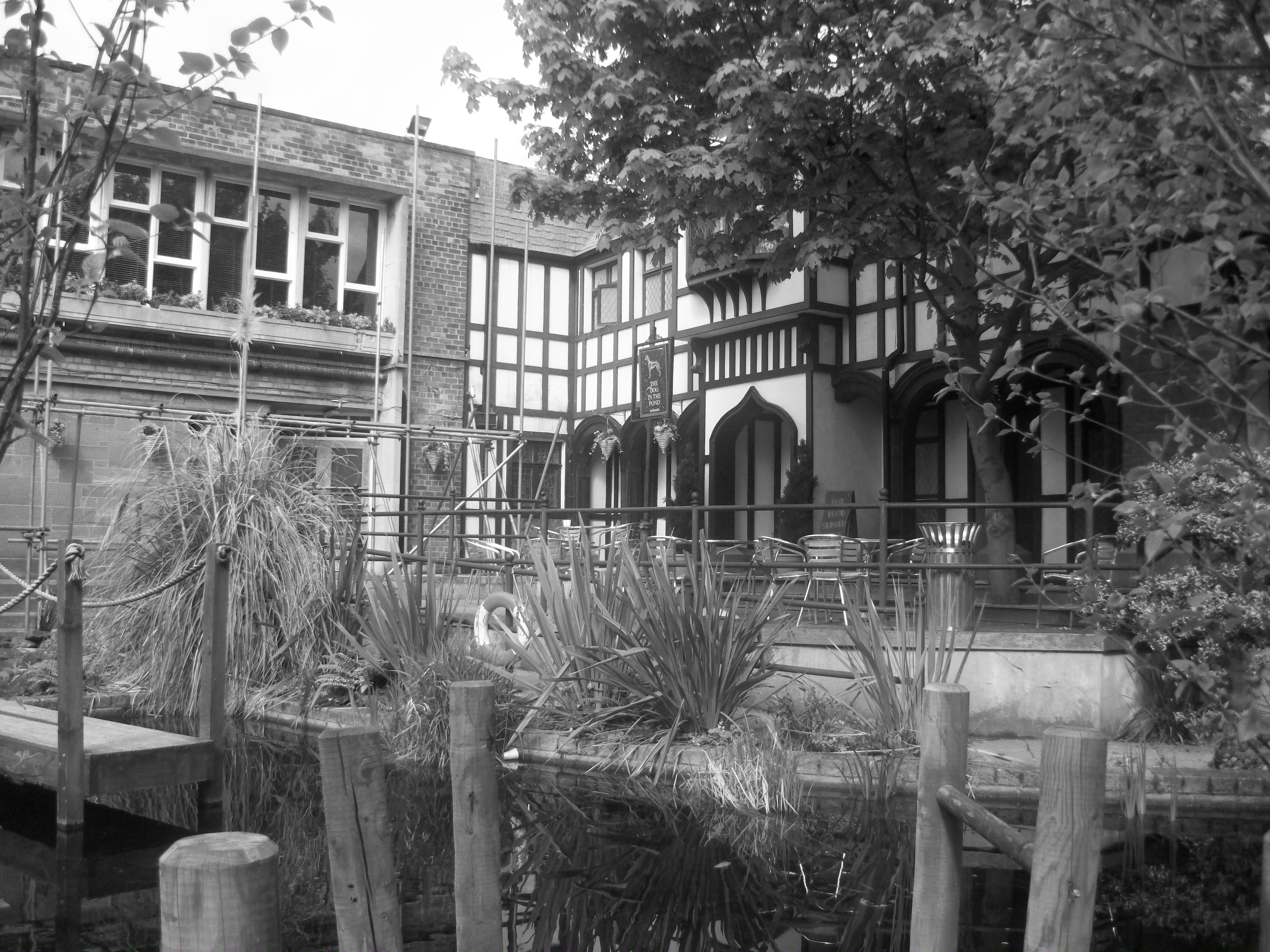
- The Dog in the Pond exterior
- First appearance: Episode 1; 23 October 1995

In-universe information
- Type: Pub
- Location: Hollyoaks
- Owner: Tony Hutchinson

The Dog in the Pond (commonly known as The Dog, briefly named The Jolly Roger) is a fictional public house in the British Channel 4 soap opera Hollyoaks. It has been at the centre of the show's setting since it began in 1995. In 2003, The Dog in the Pond was nominated as the "Best TV Boozer of All Time" in a poll run by Blackthorn Cider. The pub was burnt down in episodes airing in September 2006 during the 'Fire at The Dog', which killed five regular characters. The fire was named as one of soap's biggest disasters by the Daily Record in 2010.

== Set ==
Scenes at The Dog in the Pond are filmed at Hollyoaks studios in Lime Pictures. In 2012 the set was refurbished under the decision of series producer Emma Smithwick. On-screen owner Riley Costello decided that "it was time for a major refurbishment". In June 2012 the refurbished set began airing on-screen. Ashley Taylor Dawson, who plays landlord Darren Osborne commented on the new set, saying that "the old set had lots of nooks and crannies, so often people in the background weren't needed for every shot because they'd be out of sight of the camera. But now everyone can be seen – there's nowhere to hide – so pub filming days are like one big party. We get excited and everybody messes around".

== Storylines ==
In the beginning of the series, The Dog is owned and run by Greg Andersen (Alvin Stardust) and his wife Jane Andersen (Sally Faulkner) until 1996, when they move to the United States. Greg sells The Dog to his brother-in-law Jack Osborne (James McKenna). Jack's son Darren Osborne (Ashley Taylor Dawson) buys half soon after.

In September 2006, rapist Sam Owen (Louis Tamone) sets fire to The Dog and causes it to explode. The fire kills Sam, Mel Burton (Cassie Powney), Sophie Burton (Connie Powney), Joe Spencer (Matt Milburn) and Olivia Johnson (Rochelle Gadd). The pub is refurbished soon after and a plaque is added in memorial to the deceased. Darren loses his half of The Dog in a poker game to Warren Fox (Jamie Lomas). Warren's gangster friends take several people hostage in late 2007 and Darren is shot. Soon after, Warren sells his half back to Jack. The Osborne family begin having money troubles during 2008, which leads to Jack faking his death. After it is revealed and Jack is jailed, his wife Frankie Osborne (Helen Pearson) auctions The Dog later on and gives Neville Ashworth (Jim Millea) money so he can out-bid Warren. Nev renames the pub The Jolly Roger, but quickly changes it back to its original name after he discovers it has become a gay bar. The Ashworths own The Dog until 2010, when they move abroad and sell it to Carl Costello (Paul Opacic). The Costello family then move in. As the new owners the Costello family hire Jack Osborne as manager. Silas Blissett, father of Heidi Costello (Kim Tiddy) soon moves in. Warren Fox stages a break in which nearly goes wrong when Carl and Riley Costello (Rob Norbury) try to stand up to the thieves. He intervenes and they leave. Warren Fox's friend, Rocco (Arinze Kene), beats Riley in a bet for his father's England squad cap so Riley stages a break-in at the Dog. In late 2011 Heidi is murdered by her father Silas and Carl moves to America with his son Jason leaving other son Riley in charge, but Riley decides to move out and asks Darren and Jack Osborne to move in and run the place for him, making them licensees again.

In 2012, building work on the Dog takes place off-screen after Riley Costello decides that it was time for a major refurbishment. The Grand Opening takes place on 15 June 2012, but is interrupted after the Osbornes realise that the Savages have taken up residence in their new houseboat just outside the pub. In October 2012, Riley is shot dead by Simon Walker and leaves the pub to Mitzeee. Mitzeee departs in 2013 and puts the pub up for sale, giving the Osbornes 5 weeks to come up with the money or she would sell it elsewhere.

Seamus Brady wins a huge sum of money from gambling; he loses the slip which Darren Osborne finds. When Seamus dies, he is able to put in an offer for The Dog in the Pond, which Mitzeee accepts. Darren and his wife Nancy later exchange contracts and became the new owners of The Dog. In 2014 following her affair with Rick Spencer being exposed Nancy and Darren split up days after getting remarried. Darren offers to buy Nancy's half of The Dog and days later the contracts are exchanged making Darren the sole owner of The Dog. In October 2015, the Dog hosts Hollyoaks Gay Pride as a favour to Tony Hutchinson; however, gangster Trevor Royle, who is pursuing Jason and Robbie Roscoe, pulls out a gun and fires it, causing part of the decoration to fall, injuring Doctor Charles S'Avage who is then murdered by the Lindsey Butterfield (Sophie Austin) as the gloved hand killer. Tony tells Diane that Jack may be liable for the death. Jack later reveals to Darren that he has sold the Dog. Following the sale, the Dog in the Pond is taken over by the new pub, the Osbornes' tenure as owners.

After the entire village learn that Mac is responsible for setting the fire at Hollyoaks High that causes Neeta's death and suffered an locked in syndrome that causes into a care home, his daughter Ellie remains the owner of the pub until she sells it to Mecedes McQueen.

== Residents, landlords and employees ==
=== Current landlords and employees ===
Jobs	Characters
Landlord, licensee, barman	Tony Hutchinson
Landlady, licensee, barmaid	Diane Hutchinson

=== Current residents ===
	Characters
Residents	Tony Hutchinson; Diane Hutchinson

=== Former landlords and employees ===
Job role	Characters
Landlords	Greg Andersen (until 1996), Jack Osborne (1996–2008, 2012–2015), Neville Ashworth (2008–2010), Carl Costello (2010–2011), Riley Costello (2011–2012), Mac Nightingale (2015-2017)
Landladies	Jane Andersen (until 1996), Celia Osborne (1996–1997), Jill Osborne (1997–2000), Frankie Osborne (2005–2008, 2012–2015), Suzanne Ashworth (2008–2010), Heidi Costello (2010–2011), Neeta Kaur (2017), Ellie Nightingale (2016–2018)
Bartenders	Natasha Andersen (until 1996), Sarah Andersen (until 1996), Jill Osborne (1997–2000), Jacqui Hudson (1999–2001), Kris Fisher (2008–2009), Archie Carpenter (2008), Cindy Cunningham (2008), Josh Ashworth (2008–2010), Gilly Roach (2008–2010), Cheryl Brady (2009–2010), Jem Costello (2010), Gaz Bennett (2011) Rae Wilson (2011), Rhys Ashworth (2008–2011), Silas Blissett (2011), Mercedes McQueen (2006–2011), Riley Costello (2010–2011), Jacqui McQueen (2011–2012), Reenie McQueen (2015), Rachel Hardy (2015–2016), Diego Salvador Martinez Hernandez De La Cruz (2015–2016), Damon Kinsella (2017–2018), Brody Hudson (2017–2018), Breda McQueen (2018–2020)
Chefs	Tony Hutchinson (2011)

== See also ==
- List of fictional pubs
