= Heidi Costello =

Fictional character from Hollyoaks

- Hollyoaks character
- Portrayed by: Kim Tiddy
- Duration: 2010–2011
- First appearance: 20 July 2010
- Last appearance: 1 November 2011
- Introduced by: Paul Marquess
In-universe information
- Other names: Heidi Blissett
- Occupation: Model (before 2010); Pub landlady (2010–2011); Businesswoman (2010–2011)
- Father: Silas Blissett
- Mother: Joan Blissett
- Sisters: Wendy Blissett
- Husband: Carl Costello (until 2011)
- Sons: Riley Costello; Seth Costello; Jason Costello
- Stepdaughters: Jem Costello
- Grandsons: Bobby Costello; Phoenix Costello
- Grandmothers: Nancy Blissett
- Aunts: Trish Minniver
- First cousins: Mitzeee Minniver; Maxine Minniver
- Other relatives: Minnie Minniver

Heidi Costello (also Blissett) is a fictional character from the British Channel 4 soap opera Hollyoaks, played by Kim Tiddy. She made her first on-screen appearance on 20 July 2010 and made her final appearance in the series on 1 November 2011, after Heidi was accidentally murdered by her father, Silas Blissett (Jeff Rawle), in which he mistakes her for Lynsey Nolan (Karen Hassan).

== Character creation and casting ==
On 12 April 2010, media entertainment website Digital Spy reported that a new family, the Costellos, would be introduced to Hollyoaks as part of the soap's ongoing rejuvenation. Former The Bill actress Kim Tiddy was cast in the role of ex-model Heidi Costello. Paul Opacic was cast as her husband, Carl and Rob Norbury, Miles Higson and Victoria Atkin were cast as her three children, Riley, Seth and Jasmine. Heidi was described as a "headstrong mother" and "more than able to hold her own". Of the castings, Hollyoaks series producer Paul Marquess stated: "We can't wait for this huge new boost of energy exploding on screen. These exciting new characters join our fantastic core cast. Together they will ensure that 2010 will be a year to remember on Hollyoaks." Tiddy received the role without an audition having previously worked with Marquess on The Bill. She is three years younger than the character she is portraying.

In October 2011, Tiddy confirmed to Inside Soap that she was leaving Hollyoaks. Of her departure, she said "I've got a great exit storyline, so that's something to look out for."

== Development ==
=== Characterisation ===
Channel 5's soap opera reporting website Holy Soap describe Heidi as "glamorous and strong-minded". Kris Green of Digital Spy described her as "strong, glamorous and slightly insecure". Speaking of her character, Tiddy stated, "She's an extremely strong woman. She's got a lot of inner strength. She's completely in love with her husband and loyal to her family."

== Storylines ==
Heidi first appears in Hollyoaks when she views The Dog in the Pond public house with husband Carl. Heidi, Carl and sons Riley and Seth move to Chester after Carl purchases The Dog in the Pond. Heidi fires barmaid Cheryl Brady (Bronagh Waugh) after she flirts with Carl. Heidi sees stepdaughter her Jem (Helen Russell-Clark) and persuades her to talk to Carl. Heidi and Carl's daughter Jasmine returns from America and moves to Chester. When Heidi's cousin Mitzeee (Rachel Shenton) arrives they organise a charity fashion show and Charlotte Lau (Amy Yamazaki) offers Heidi the SU bar for the event. Heidi visits Cindy Cunningham's (Stephanie Waring) boutique Cincerity and asks her to showcase her clothes at the fashion show for a challenge. At the fashion show, Heidi wins the challenge. When Mitzeee speaks to Theresa McQueen (Jorgie Porter) through her microphone, Heidi hears that she had sex with Carl. She forgives Carl after he tells her that he had sex with Mitzeee before they moved to Chester. She also forgives Mitzeee.

Heidi purchases Cincerity with Gabby Sharpe (Phina Oruche) acting as a silent partner. Heidi becomes a school governor at Hollyoaks High School. When Jem pays Mitzeee to have sex with Carl, Heidi finds Mitzeee with Jem's ex-boyfriend Liam McAllister (Chris Overton) and realises that Jem wanted Mitzeee to have sex with Carl. When Jasmine tells Heidi that she is a transgender boy and wants to be called Jason, Heidi is shocked and refuses to accept his gender identity. Heidi's father Silas Blissett (Jeff Rawle) arrives for Christmas and Heidi persuades Jasmine to wear girls clothing whilst he is staying. Silas gives Jasmine a bracelet, which causes Jasmine to reveal the truth. Heidi takes Jasmine to a clinic to understand her condition. Heidi is angry when the counsellor Michael Chadwick (Alan French) encourages Jasmine. After Heidi argues with Jasmine, Jasmine runs off and runs into an oncoming car, which is being driven by Bart McQueen (Jonny Clarke). Heidi accepts Jasmine is now Jason after a confrontation with Bart. Whilst Heidi is preparing a family meal, she burns herself with boiling water and goes to Dee Valley Hospital. Heidi's chest is scarred as a result.

Gaz Bennett (Joel Goonan) finds employment at The Dog in the Pond and becomes attracted to Heidi. After Carl becomes distant from Heidi, Gaz comforts her and they kiss. Heidi then decides to fire Gaz, but she decides against it after he tells her how important the job is to him. When Carl finds a shirt that Heidi has bought, he assumes that she is having an affair and asks Gaz spy on her. Doug Carter (PJ Brennan) asks Heidi for help organising a stag weekend and Gaz tells Carl. An angry Carl assumes that they are having an affair and attacks Doug, but Heidi tells him he is wrong. Carl arranges for himself and Heidi to stay at a hotel for the night as an apology for neglecting her. Heidi goes ahead whilst Carl attends a meeting. She receives a call informing her that Carl is waiting for her. When Heidi goes to meet him, she sees Gaz and realises that he has pretended to be Carl. She flirts with Gaz and they have sex. Gaz then takes a photo of himself and Heidi in bed on his mobile phone. Carl calls Heidi telling her that he has arrived and is coming to meet her. Both Heidi and Gaz get dressed and Gaz hides as Heidi and Carl go down to the bar. Gaz leaves the hotel room, forgetting to retrieve the watch that Carl gave him. Rae Wilson (Alice Barlow) finds the photo on Gaz's phone and sends it to Heidi. Gaz discovers that Rae sent the photo and Heidi hears them arguing. Rae tells Heidi she sent the photo to protect her and Heidi deletes it. Gaz's watch is then delivered by a courrier and is given to Jason, who questions Gaz as to why it was in the hotel room. Gaz admits to Jason that he slept with Heidi. Jason responds by hitting Gaz but is interrupted by Carl. Carl questions Jason, who demands Heidi to tell the truth. Heidi then tells Carl that she slept with Gaz.

When Riley becomes engaged to pregnant Mercedes McQueen (Jennifer Metcalfe) Heidi makes frenemies with Myra McQueen (Nicole Barber-Lane) as they often clashed on how to plan the wedding. During the wedding, it is revealed that Mercedes and Carl had a four-month affair, leaving Heidi devastated that he'd cheat on her again. She is comforted by Jason and Seth, and walks out keeping her head held high to retain some dignity. Heidi is unaware that after the wedding, Silas kidnapped Mercedes and is currently holding her hostage in the basement under the Dog in the Pond. Heidi tells Carl to move out of The Dog and Jason is devastated when Heidi tells him that her and Carl were getting a divorce and storms out.

For Halloween, Texas Longford (Bianca Hendrickse-Spendlove) invites Heidi and Riley to "Fright Night" in Chez Chez. Heidi excitedly gets ready for the party and is disappointed when Riley decides not to go, although she reminds Riley and Seth how much she loves them both. Later on, Heidi goes to the party dressed as 'Catwoman', unaware that Lynsey Nolan (Karen Hassan) and Texas are wearing the same costume. However that same night, Silas, who has been murdering various girls in the village, has vowed to strike again. As Heidi walks to Chez Chez, Silas grabs her, mistaking her for Lynsey, and hits her over the head with a brick before strangling her to death. As he throws her body to the ground, Silas sees blonde hair under the wig and is visibly distressed when he realises he has murdered his daughter.

Silas is soon arrested for the murders he committed, and the village holds a memorial for all of Silas's victims, including Rae, Rebecca Massey (Daisy Turner) and India Longford (Beth Kingston).

== Reception ==
Heidi's murder gained a nomination in the category of "Best Exit" at the 2012 British Soap Awards. Holy Soap describe Heidi's most memorable moment as "beating manipulative Cindy a fashion challenge." In July 2010, Heidi came fourth in a poll run by the official Hollyoaks website to find viewers favourite member of the Costello family. She received 12.13% of the vote. Heidi's death was voted the biggest OMG moment of the year for a special "Hollyoaks: Best Bits of 2011".
