= Riley Costello =

Fictional character from Hollyoaks

- Hollyoaks character
- Portrayed by: Rob Norbury
- Duration: 2010–2012
- First appearance: 20 July 2010
- Last appearance: 3 October 2012
- Introduced by: Paul Marquess
- Spin-off appearances: Hollyoaks Later (2010–2012)
In-universe information
- Occupation: Footballer (until 2012); Barman (2010–2011); Pub owner (2011–2012)
- Father: Carl Costello
- Mother: Heidi Costello
- Brothers: Seth Costello; Jason Costello
- Half-sisters: Jem Costello
- Sons: Bobby Costello; Phoenix Costello
- Grandfathers: Silas Blissett
- Grandmothers: Joan Blissett
- Uncles: Trev Costello
- Aunts: Wendy Blissett
- Other relatives: Trish Minniver; Mitzeee Minniver; Maxine Minniver; Minnie Minniver

Riley Costello is a fictional character from the British Channel 4 soap opera Hollyoaks, played by Rob Norbury. Riley was introduced on 20 July 2010 with the Costello family as part of a cast overhaul of the series. In December 2011, the serial's executive producer Emma Smithwick said that Riley would remain in Hollyoaks despite his family's departure. On 14 September 2012, it was announced Riley was to leave Hollyoaks and Riley was killed off in a shooting during the episode airing 3 October 2012.

== Creation and casting ==
In 2010, auditions were held for the part of Riley, a young footballer and member of the Costello clan. Former Grange Hill and Hollyoaks: In the City actor Rob Norbury was cast in the role. The Costellos were introduced as the family of already-established character Jem Costello (Helen Russell-Clark). The family consists of Carl Costello (Paul Opacic), a former premiership footballer with a history for cheating on his wife, Heidi (Kim Tiddy), a former model, and their children, Riley, who is training to become a footballer to impress his father, Seth (Miles Higson), who is desperate to step out from his older brother's shadow, and Jasmine (Victoria Atkin), who is secretly suffering due to gender dysphoria. Speaking of the family's casting, Marquess said, "We can't wait for this huge new boost of energy exploding on screen. These exciting new characters join our fantastic core cast. Together they will ensure that 2010 will be a year to remember on Hollyoaks."

== Development ==
Riley has been described by Kim Tiddy, who portrays Heidi, as a "Jack-the-lad" type character. Another source calls Riley a "lothario". Norbury was questioned about his character's relationship with younger brother Seth during an interview on the official Hollyoaks website. He responded saying: "I think it's kind of like any brotherly relationship. As the older brother you've got to look out for them, but also they're there for you to have a little mess around with. I don't know which direction things will go, but at the moment a lot of the time when we're together, we don't seem that bothered about each other. But as brothers we get on, and that's kind of like most brothers isn't it. You don't want to know too much about them, you just want them there, to have a laugh with and to argue with." The relationship was further explored in the fourth series of spin-off Hollyoaks Later.

In December 2011, the serial's executive producer Emma Smithwick said that Riley would be the only member of the Costello family remaining in the serial. Smithwick told Inside Soap that Riley's storyline with Mercedes had not been concluded. She confirmed that the storyline would return to the "fore" of the serial in 2012.

On 14 September, Daniel Kilkelly from Digital Spy confirmed Norbury had left Hollyoaks. Kilkelly stated that while the actor had filmed his final scenes as Riley, the exact details of his exit would be kept under wraps. The following month, Riley died on-screen. Norbury revealed that he had filmed his final scenes on 11 September. He explained "I knew I was leaving quite a while ago now, so then it was a case of waiting to see what my leaving story would be. We decided in early summer that I was going, and then we ended up having a chat in July or August time when they said they'd had an idea of Riley being killed." The actor thought killing his character off was "better than a lot of other exits that you can get" and he was pleased with how it played out.

== Storylines ==
Riley first appears with his family when his father Carl (Paul Opacic) buys The Dog in the Pond. Riley attracts the attention of Michaela McQueen (Hollie-Jay Bowes). Zak Ramsey (Kent Riley) is jealous, so challenges Riley to penalty shootouts, unaware he is a footballer. During a fashion show for Heidi, Riley strips for the cat walk, where Theresa McQueen (Jorgie Porter) is attracted to him. Carl continues to push Riley into training for football. Riley and Seth Costello (Miles Higson) are invited to a cage fighting party by half-sister Jem's {Helen Russell-Clark ex-boyfriend Liam McAllister (Chris Overton), who plans to get revenge on Carl for ruining his football career with older brother Nathan McAllister (Michael Bisping). Riley is seduced by Sami (Candy McCulloch), Nathan's girlfriend, and sleeps with her before being drugged. After Nathan and Liam lock Riley and Seth in a cage, they tie Carl up with a noose around his neck. Nathan and Liam make Riley and Seth cage fight each other, after convincing Seth that Carl is ashamed of him. The Costellos soon escape, with help from Sami, and are chased by Nathan and Liam, who have a gun. Carl manages to get the gun, and flees with Riley and Seth. Nathan follows again, and in a rooftop confrontation, he ends up falling from the roof to his death.

Riley bonds with Mercedes Fisher (Jennifer Metcalfe) following her husband's death however, Carl is unhappy at their blossoming relationship. Mercedes tries to dump him however when he proposes to her, she rejects but they continue with their relationship. However, Mercedes begins having an affair with Carl and is nearly caught on several occasions. Soon, Riley realises that he loves her and asks her to marry him, to which Mercedes says yes, to Carl's disgust, Mercedes later discovers she is pregnant, and is unsure of who the baby's father is.

In March, he hears Lynsey Nolan (Karen Hassan) being attacked in her and Cheryl's flat and manages to chase off the attacker before he can harm her. However, when he asks Lynsey to stay at his house with his family, Lynsey realises it was Silas Blissett (Jeff Rawle) who tried to attack her and escapes. In a pub confrontation, Lynsey accuses Silas of attacking her and Riley throws her out and continues to deny he attacked her, however in a meeting with Lynsey and Texas Longford (Bianca Hendrikse-Spendlove) Riley realises there is more to his granddad. He confronts him in the park and questions him about the attack to which Silas has a heart attack and is rushed to hospital. In October 2011, Riley and Mercedes wedding day arrives but Mercedes is unable to deal with the guilt and reveals she has been having an affair with his father Carl. Riley then walks out of the wedding and drives off leaving Mercedes crying, a few days later Riley has a one-night stand with student Ash Kane (Holly Weston) and regrets this and ignores her afterwards. Riley later attempts to call Mercedes but it goes through to voice mail he leaves a message but Mercedes is unable to reply as she is being held in a basement by Silas.

On Halloween 2011, Heidi is murdered by Silas, who mistook her for Lynsey, while walking to Cheryl Brady's (Bronagh Waugh) party. She is found by a passer-by, who phones an ambulance, but she is dead. Jason is informed and comes home and breaks the news to Riley and Seth. It is eventually revealed, however, that Silas is the unknown serial killer who killed Heidi and also murdered India Longford (Beth Kingston), Rebecca Massey (Daisy Turner), and Rae Wilson (Alice Barlow). Riley confronts Silas and demands to know the truth and Silas admits that he was responsible for the other murders, but swears that Heidi's death was an accident. Lynsey phones the police, who then arrest Silas and charge him with the killings. Riley and Carl find Mercedes in the basement, just minutes away from giving birth. She gives birth to a boy, whom she names Bobby McQueen. However, Mercedes does not take to motherhood very well, struggling to cope. She asks Riley to take Bobby on holiday for a while, so he and Seth leave the village for a brief-break.

Riley is later seen on the TV by Mercedes, doing a plea for Bobby's whereabouts. Riley returns, after Jacqui pleads with him to bring Bobby back to see Mercedes, telling him she has not been doing well in his absence. Riley asks Mercedes to sign legal papers giving him full custody of Bobby. Riley sees Darren Osborne (Ashley Taylor Dawson) giving away photos of the vault in which Silas held Mercedes captive. He attacks Darren, punching him and pinning him onto a table, declaring that he is selling the pub which he had given to him before he left. The next day, a guilt-stricken Darren visits Riley and pleads with him not to sell the pub and Darren later confesses to Riley that his girlfriend Nancy Hayton (Jessica Fox) is pregnant with his child. Riley later forgives Darren and decides not to sell the pub after being persuaded against the idea by Lynsey. Riley helps Ste Hay (Kieron Richardson) and Doug Carter (PJ Brennan) with their business, and in doing so, Lynsey helps them too and later she asks Riley to walk her home. When they reach Lynsey's house, Riley goes in for a coffee and the pair kiss and end up sleeping together.

Riley is distraught when Lynsey is later murdered and begins a relationship with Mercedes again, helping her after she was apparently stabbed by Mitzeee (Rachel Shenton) and kidnapped by Lynsey's killer, Dr. Paul Browning (Joseph Thompson). They are engaged to be married but, shortly before the wedding, Riley sleeps with Mitzeee, who is on the run from prison. Shortly after, Bobby is abducted with Mitzeee as the prime suspect. Riley ends up in a stand-off on a tower block roof with Mercedes after he later finds out that she was behind Bobby's apparent kidnap. Although Mercedes threatens to kill herself and Bobby, Riley manages to convince her to come down. When they return home, he is shocked to discover Mercedes did in fact stab herself and he watches as she is arrested. Riley leaves the house to find Mitzeee but, when he finds her, he is accidentally shot by Simon Walker (Neil Newbon). Riley is taken to hospital but later dies, with Mitzeee by his side.

In November 2012, follow by Riley's death, Mitzeee was completely devastated when he died, and never got a chance to see him. In December, Mercedes is put on trial, with Doctor Browning also fabricating stories to get Mercedes released. Doctor Browning brings up the suggestion that Riley could actually be Lynsey's killer, and this is accepted by the court, resulting in both Doctor Browning and Mercedes being released, and Riley posthumously charged with Lynsey's murder. The murder charge is later cleared when Doctor Browning confesses to the murder.

== Reception ==
Rob Norbury was nominated for the Sexiest Male award in the 2011 Inside Soap Awards A writer for the Sunday Mercury said Riley's time away from the village had "certainly toughened him up". Gemma Graham and Jon Horsley of TV Buzz said that Riley and Lynsey are "a coupling we could definitely get on board with".
