= Silas Blissett =

UK soap opera character, created 2010

- Hollyoaks character
- Portrayed by: Jeff Rawle
- Duration: 2010–2012, 2016, 2020–2022
- First appearance: Episode 2979; 23 December 2010
- Last appearance: 29 September 2022
- Introduced by: Paul Marquess (2010); Emma Smithwick (2012); Bryan Kirkwood (2016, 2020); Lucy Allan (2022)
- Spin-off appearances: Hollyoaks Later (2011)
In-universe information
- Other names: Cameron; David Cox; Edward Mann
- Occupation: Journalist; Barman
- Mother: Nancy Blissett
- Wife: Joan Blissett
- Daughters: Heidi Costello; Wendy Blissett
- Grandsons: Riley Costello; Seth Costello; Jason Costello
- Other relatives: Bobby Costello; Phoenix Costello

Silas Blissett is a fictional character from the British Channel 4 soap opera Hollyoaks, played by Jeff Rawle. Rawle's casting was announced in December 2010 and it was revealed that he would portray a serial killer. Rawle was approached by Hollyoaks and met with series producer, Paul Marquess, who explained the role of Silas and his storyline. Rawle found the storyline something which he would like to "have a crack at". The actor said that the role of Silas is "very interesting" for him as he had not played a murderer in his career before. He made his first on-screen appearance in episode 2979, originally broadcast on 23 December 2010. However, Silas departed for the first time on 4 November 2011. Silas returned on 19 July 2012, as a guest stint. Silas returned again in 2016 as well as making two further returns in 2020 and 2022 with this being his last return as he was killed-off in a final showdown with the McQueens.

Silas was credited as "Mystery Man" in his first episode to keep his identity hidden. He is revealed to be Heidi Costello's (Kim Tiddy) father and the grandfather of Riley Costello (Rob Norbury), Seth Costello (Miles Higson) and Jason Costello (Victoria Atkin). Silas is a serial killer who is described as sinister, scary and complex. Marquess called him mild-mannered and likened him to a bogeyman. Daniel Kilkelly of Digital Spy described Silas as a dual role of the affable older man and sinister killer. Silas is "old-fashioned" and dislikes women with "loose morals"; believing his murders as a positive, cleansing service to society.

Silas' storylines have mostly focused on his various murders. From his onscreen murders and his scrap book, Silas has seventeen confirmed victims on the show, and is believed to have killed up to 100 women. Silas murders India Longford (Beth Kingston) after using another identity on an internet dating website and arranging to meet her. Silas plans to murder India's sister Texas Longford (Bianca Hendrickse-Spendlove), but refrains. Silas begins targeting Lynsey Nolan (Karen Hassan). Silas then murders a woman named Jenny (Daisy Turner) after they arrange to meet on a social networking site. Silas also murders Rae Wilson (Alice Barlow) and frames Brendan Brady (Emmett J. Scanlan) for the crime. Silas kidnaps Riley's pregnant fiancée, Mercedes McQueen (Jennifer Metcalfe), who confesses that she had an affair with Riley's father Carl Costello (Paul Opacic), and Silas holds her captive. He accidentally murders Heidi after mistaking her for Lynsey, before being arrested for his crimes. Silas left Hollyoaks on 4 November 2011, but returned for a guest stint on 19 July 2012, in an attempt to murder Texas again, but once again, refrains.

The character made an unannounced return in 2016 as part of the show's new serial killer story. In his return, Silas works with murderous doctor Lindsey Roscoe (Sophie Austin) before killing her. Rawle reprised the role again in October 2020 for Hollyoaks' 25th anniversary, departing again in episodes originally broadcast in January 2021. The character and Rawle's portrayal has been well received by viewers, critics and his co-stars alike, with Silas being considered as one of the soap's most popular and infamous villains. Rawle won "Best Villain" at the 2012 All About Soap Bubble Awards.

== Storylines ==
=== 2010–2012 ===
Texas Longford (Bianca Hendrickse-Spendlove) joins an internet dating website, and starts corresponding with a man named Cameron. Texas' sister, India Longford (Beth Kingston), makes contact with Cameron and they agree to meet. On her way to their arranged date, India meets Silas, who reveals that he is Cameron. Silas murders India and takes the ring from her finger before burying her body in the woods. He is revealed to be Heidi Costello's (Kim Tiddy) father when he visits his family at Christmas. It soon emerges that Silas killed his wife and Heidi's mother, Joan, after discovering that she was having an affair with her neighbour. Silas meets Nancy Hayton (Jessica Fox) and prepares to strangle her to death, however he is interrupted by her boyfriend. Silas intends to strangle an intoxicated Texas to death, but refrains when she explains that she pressured India into internet dating.

Silas is angry with Lynsey Nolan (Karen Hassan) after hearing her give sexual health advice on the radio, and seeing her on the radio's webcam wearing a scantily clad nurse costume. Silas stops Lynsey from gaining a promotion by telling her place of work about the radio show. Silas attacks Lynsey but her screams alert her neighbours, causing him to flee. Lynsey realises that Silas was her attacker and confronts him on numerous occasions, but her allegation is ignored. Lynsey also accuses Silas of murdering India and his grandson, Riley Costello (Rob Norbury), begins to question Lynsey's allegations. Silas experiences a heart attack after Riley questions him. In hospital, Lynsey is assigned as Silas' nurse and withholds his treatment as she assumes he is feigning the attack. Silas later recovers. Silas sees Lynsey giving Cheryl Brady (Bronagh Waugh) weight loss drugs and secretly swaps them with his heart medication. Cheryl takes the medication more frequently to suppress her appetite. Whilst Cheryl is alone in her nightclub, she climbs upon the bar and becomes drowsy, causing her to fall. She is found unconscious by Lynsey and begins to recover in hospital. Lynsey is told by a doctor that tests showed a high amount of sedative in Cheryl's system. Silas makes Cheryl doubt Lynsey's state of mind when he tells her that he thinks Lynsey could be capable of swapping the drugs.

Jenny (Daisy Turner) starts corresponding with a man named David Cox on a social networking website. Jenny meets David in the woods, where he is revealed to be Silas. They have a picnic and when Silas sees Jenny drugging his glass of wine, he secretly swaps them. Silas sees Jenny searching through his bag and threatens her, causing her to run away. She becomes drowsy and falls to the ground. Silas strangles Jenny to death and takes the ring from her finger, before burying her body in the woods. Silas takes a dislike to Riley's fiancée, Mercedes McQueen (Jennifer Metcalfe), after he learns of her promiscuity. Silas attempts and fails to attack Mercedes with a candlestick when her back is turned.

Silas develops a feud with Lynsey. He plans to murder Texas again, but Lynsey foils his plan. Lynsey attempts and fails to frame Silas after planting India's necklace on him and contacting the police. Silas attempts to make Lynsey appear unstable by moving things around in her flat and playing tricks on her. Lynsey's friend, Brendan Brady (Emmett J. Scanlan), sees Silas watching Lynsey and becomes suspicious of him. Brendan warns Silas to stay away from Lynsey. Silas plans to strangle Theresa McQueen (Jorgie Porter) to death, but refrains after he learns that she has a daughter. Rae Wilson (Alice Barlow) tells Silas that Brendan threatened to kill her. She annoys Silas by telling him she plans to use men for flings after being hurt by them. Silas brutally beats and strangles Rae to death and takes her necklace. He then frames Brendan for her murder. Lynsey arranges to meet a girl who has been sending Texas messages on an internet dating website, convinced that it is Silas. Lynsey confronts Silas in the woods and hits him over the head with a rock, leaving him unconscious. Lynsey returns to the woods with the police to find Silas gone. Silas is contacted by the police and tells them he is holidaying in France and denies any knowledge of the attack.

Silas holds a heavily pregnant Mercedes captive in the basement of The Dog in the Pond after she confesses to having an affair with Riley's father, Carl Costello (Paul Opacic). Mercedes' family assumes she has gone on holiday to Dubai. On Halloween, Silas tells Lynsey he is going to kill her, but she attacks him and escapes. Silas later sees a woman in the same Halloween costume as Lynsey and hits her over the head with a brick and strangles her to death. However, he realises that the woman is his daughter Heidi, leaving him devastated. Silas finds Lynsey and Riley searching through his belongings. Lynsey smashes an urn containing Silas' late wife Joan's ashes. Amongst the ashes, Lynsey and Riley find jewellery belonging to the murder victims. Riley sees Mercedes' engagement ring, but Silas does not tell him where Mercedes is. Riley demands Silas admit to Jason and Seth that he murdered their mother and he is then arrested, however, he refuses to tell the police where Mercedes is. Silas tells Lynsey that she will have to play a game of chess in order to find Mercedes, but she refuses. Lynsey taunts Silas about his involvement in Heidi's death and he angrily tells her that Mercedes is in the gutter. Lynsey explains this to Riley, who finds Mercedes. Lynsey visits Silas one last time, telling him he no longer scares her. Silas is last seen in his jail cell, staring at a chess piece, accepting that he'll spend the rest of his life behind bars.

Silas is not put on trial as he is moved to a mental institution when he is deemed insane. In July 2012, Lynsey is strangled by an unseen person in similar circumstances to Silas' victims. When Silas demands to see Texas in relation to possible information on Lynsey's murder, Texas visits him in the mental health institution where he is serving his sentences. Silas taunts Texas by explaining how he killed her sister India. He tells Texas that another young woman will die the following day. Texas visits him again a few days later, and tells Silas that she is no longer frightened of him. Silas warns her that another copycat killing will soon occur. He explains that to prevent this he will tell her the identity of the killer if she gives him India's ring. Texas agrees and he tells her that the killer is Will Savage (James Atherton). Texas snatches the ring back, angering Silas. When on a routine appointment at the hospital, Silas fakes a heart attack. He escapes and visits Lynsey's body in the mortuary. Silas sees an apparition of Lynsey who he compliments, telling her she played a good game. Lynsey taunts him saying his game is over as he did not get to what he most wanted as someone else killed her. Silas tells her his game is not over. Silas kidnaps Texas in her flat and leads Texas to believe he will kill her before telling her that he will bide his time and then kill her, this way she will be living in fear of him. Silas then boards a bus, full of young women who are going to a hen party.

=== 2016 ===
Silas visits Trevor Royle (Greg Wood) in prison under the name Mr. E Mann (Mystery Man). It is revealed that Silas had been writing to Trevor as he heard about the Gloved Hand Killer who had murdered seven residents throughout 2015. As Silas asks Trevor disturbing questions, Trevor tells Silas to back off and never contact him again. Silas leaves but has a feeling that Trevor is innocent and is determined to find out who the real killer is. Silas returns to Hollyoaks again in February, this time for an appointment with Tegan Lomax (Jessica Ellis), a nurse at Dee Valley Hospital. During the appointment, Silas tells Tegan he believes that the killer is one of the nurses or doctors who work at the hospital as medical equipment mysteriously disappeared during the time of the murders. Silas' interrogation about the murders makes Tegan uncomfortable and she leaves briefly, and once she returns Silas has already left. Silas visits Dee Valley Hospital again a few weeks later, this time imitating a human resources officer while visiting Lindsey Roscoe (Sophie Austin) in her office. After she confides in him about her feelings on her sister Kim Butterfield's (Daisy Wood-Davis) arrest for the murders, he leaves with the chilling parting words that he is a keen admirer of her good work and to keep it up, implying that he knows she is the real killer.

In April 2016, Lindsey is finally exposed as the Gloved Hand Killer. When Lindsey tries to hide from the police, Silas contacts her and helps her escape. She recognises him from the hospital, and he reveals his true identity to her. Silas tells her that he wants to help her as he, "knew a Lynsey once before", and it is a beautiful name. He expresses a deep admiration for her work so far and offers her the chance to go into hiding with him as he feels that with the right tuition from him, the pair would make an unstoppable force. As Lindsey gives him a willing smile, the two serial killers drive off into the night. Lindsey later calls Silas in desperate need of his help after she attempts to convince Kim to steal her son, JJ from her ex-fiancé, Joe Roscoe (Ayden Callaghan). Silas replies by saying that he knew she would return to him, and hangs up the phone with a sinister smile. Silas turns his attention to Kim, using a fake name "Edward" on social media, to lure her in. Believing that he has information on Lindsey's whereabouts, Kim inadvertently goes along with it. Silas tells her he is a retired policeman and uses her as a decoy so that the two killers can go ahead with their dastardly plans. Silas later meets Lindsey at a car park and tells her that he has Kim on side and that the plan is proceeding perfectly: that sooner or later, Lindsey will be reunited with her son and he will finally get another chance to claim the life of Mercedes.

Kim meets Silas once again in the hospital while it is temporarily shut down. Silas and Lindsey put their plan into action and break into the Roscoe home but Mercedes is not there. Angered by this failure, Silas disowns Lindsey and tells her he will go after Mercedes alone. However, Lindsey's waters break and she goes into labour. Alarmed, Silas bundles her into the Roscoe garage, steals Joe's phone and abandons her. Later that day, Mercedes answers the door to find Silas. Meanwhile, Lindsey has managed to summon Kim for help and gives birth to a baby girl at the hospital with the reluctant help of Tegan and Celine McQueen (Sarah George). When Joe and Freddie Roscoe (Charlie Clapham) arrive at the hospital to find Lindsey with the baby, they try to call the police, but Lindsey warns them not to as Mercedes is in danger. Silas plays a game of chess with Mercedes, while blaming her for Riley's death. Mercedes angrily demands where Silas was when Riley died and throws him into a rage when she reminds him of his part in Heidi's death. He tells her that she is to be his final victim and he will not be cheated this time as he was with Lynsey and Texas. Silas allows Mercedes to take JJ to bed, but she secretly hides a nail file in her pocket. When Silas guides her downstairs, Mercedes attempts to stab him with the nail file, but Silas easily deflects it. Lindsey then gives the order for Silas to kill Mercedes, which Mercedes criticises, as Silas is taking orders from a woman. Mercedes informs Silas of Lindsey's adulterous past who cheated on Joe with Freddie. When Silas sees a locket containing a picture of Mercedes' stillborn son, Gabriel, he criticises him and brands him as another one of her illegitimate children. Furious, Mercedes demands him to kill her so she can be with Gabriel and have the chance of being a mother to him. Silas is touched by this and noting that Mercedes has made significant effort to mend her ways over the years, he decides to spare her life. When Lindsey shows up at the Roscoe home, having managed to escape from the hospital with her baby, Silas feigns concern and asks to hold her baby. Silas then gives Mercedes the baby and asks her to ensure that the child grows up as pure and innocent as she is now. Silas then turns on Lindsey for cheating on the Roscoe brothers. Joe, Kim and Freddie arrive to find Lindsey's corpse on the couch. Silas is last seen looking on as a hysterical Myra McQueen (Nicole Barber-Lane) is led out of The Loft by Tegan and Celine. He then leaves the village, smirking.

=== 2020−2022 ===
Four years later, the McQueen family begin to be blackmailed by an anonymous source, who communicates using a porcelain doll. They threaten to expose the family's sins in return for money. It emerges that Silas is the anonymous source and when Mercedes refuses the blackmailer's demands, he attempts to kill her. However, when he learns that she is pregnant, he refrains. It soon emerges that he is working with someone else. Silas finds Mercedes' stepdaughter Cher Winters (Bethannie Hare) drunk and takes her home; he takes pictures of her to send to the McQueens, threatening to kill Cher if they refuse his demands. Silas calls Mercedes and taunts her, causing her to fall and miscarry. It emerges that Seth is working with Silas to blackmail the family and is using Theresa to extract information about the family. Silas explains that he wants to meet his great-grandson, Bobby Costello (Jayden Fox), who he believes is trapped by the McQueens.

Silas gets Seth to collect fake passports while he picks Bobby up from the airport, he sends Bobby off on a scavenger hunt before calling Mercedes to taunt her and inform her he has got Bobby. Mercedes meets with Silas where he offers two solutions; Bobby will stay with Silas and Mercedes can live, or Bobby can stay with the McQueens but it means Silas must kill Mercedes. Mercedes chooses to let Silas kill her, after making him promise that he will let Bobby go, but before he can do so, Theresa knocks Silas out, allowing Mercedes to escape. Bobby finds Silas and gives him first aid. He then flees the scene before the police arrive, having decided not to pursue Mercedes, but he secretly stays in contact with Bobby, playing chess with him under the username 'G'.

A year later, after Wendy Blissett (Jennifer Armour) failed to get Bobby for Silas, Silas decides to claim Bobby himself. He abducts Mercedes and forces Olivia Bradshaw (Emily Burnett) to work with him, but when she refuses and attempts to rescue Mercedes, Silas knocks her out and keeps her chained up with Mercedes. Silas then forces the rest of the McQueen family to play a series of sinister games during the village carnival. He forces Goldie McQueen (Chelsee Healey) and Theresa to choose who to die by trapping them in a carnival attraction that is rigged with a bomb. Theresa chooses Goldie to live, and Goldie escapes the attraction as Silas detonates the bomb, causing devastation in the carnival, although Theresa was able to survive. While Goldie attempts to find Bobby with the help of Lexi Calder (Natalie Anderson), Silas arrives and kills Lexi by bludgeoning her over the head and then takes Bobby. Silas forces the McQueens to play a final game; a deadly game of human chess involving an electrified chessboard. Mercedes is able to complete the game and knocks Silas out and deactivates the board, allowing the family to escape. Silas regains consciousness and attempts to convince Bobby to leave with him, but Bobby, upon noticing that the electricity to the chessboard has been reactivated, pushes Silas onto the chessboard, electrocuting him to death.

== Casting and characterisation ==
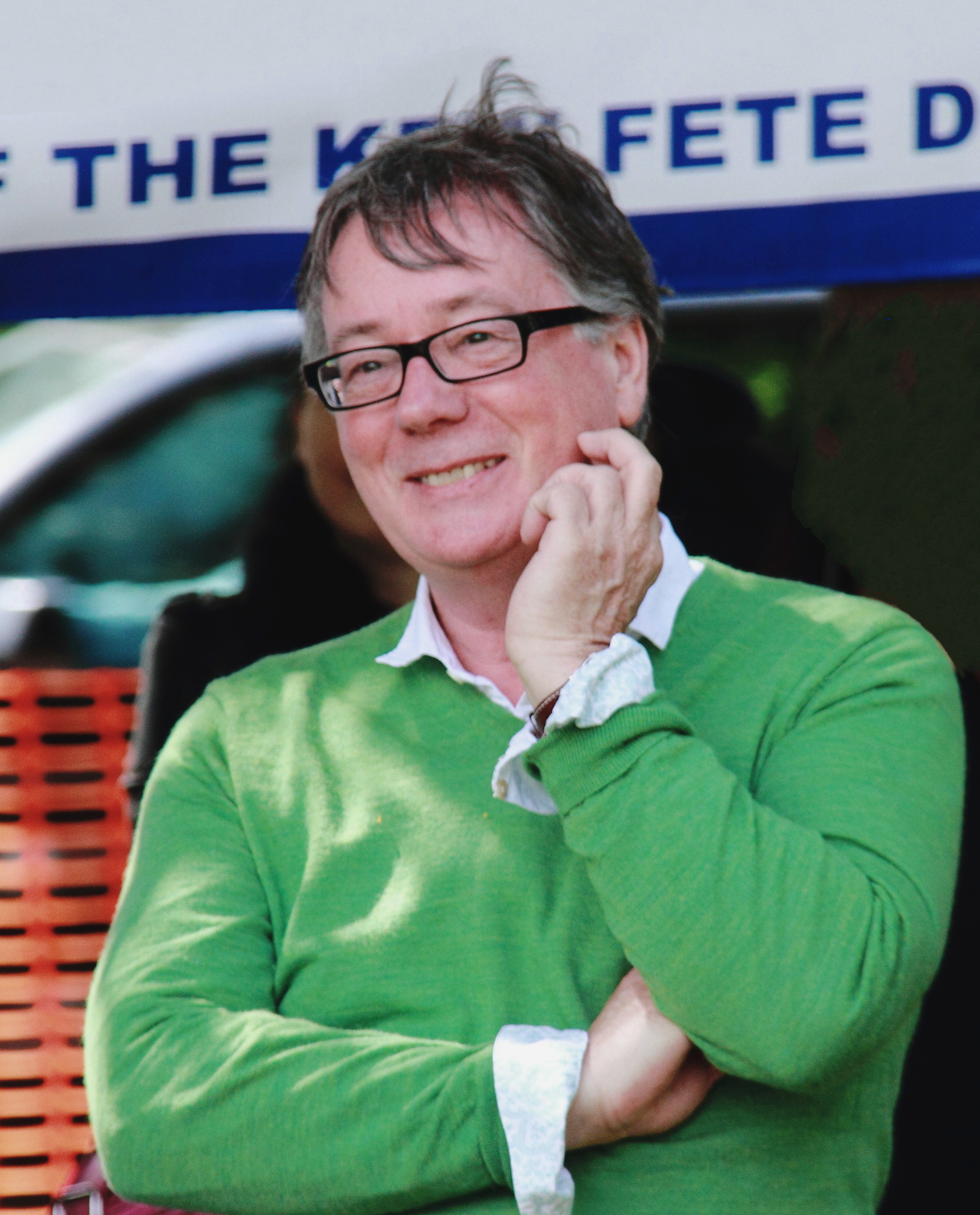
Jeff Rawle said that he accepted the role of Silas to highlight the dangers of online dating.

In December 2010, it was announced that India Longford (Beth Kingston) would be murdered in a "dark" new storyline. It was announced that actor, Jeff Rawle, had been cast in the role of India's murderer. Rawle was best known as playing Amos Diggory in Harry Potter and the Goblet of Fire in 2005. Rawle was approached by Hollyoaks and met with series producer, Paul Marquess, who explained the storyline. Rawle found the storyline interesting and something which he would like to "have a crack at". Rawle took on the role to highlight the dangers of online dating. Rawle said that the role is "very interesting" for him as he had not played a murderer in his career before. Rawle made his first appearance as Silas on 23 December 2010. Silas was credited as "Mystery Man" in his first episode to keep his identity hidden. He was revealed to be the father of Heidi Costello (Kim Tiddy). In 2011, Rawle revealed that he is delighted to be playing Silas, stating "It's the best role to have. Judy Garland once said, 'If you have to be in a soap, make sure you don't play the worst part'. She was talking about her own life being a soap, but she's right." Rawle opined that the role of Silas is the "best part" and said that other cast members are jealous as they want to play a villain. Silas made his final appearance on 4 November 2011.

Silas is described as "sinister" and "scary". Rawle said that Silas is "very interesting" and complex. Hollyoaks series producer, Paul Marquess, called him mild-mannered and likened him to a bogeyman. Daniel Kilkelly of Digital Spy described Silas as a dual role of the affable older man and sinister killer. Rawle explained that Silas is "old-fashioned" and dislikes women who have loose morals. Silas actually appeared to enjoy killing people and although he mockingly apologised to some of his victims, he clearly didn't mean those apologies. There are only two known murders that he actually felt regret for; murdering his own daughter and killing India but these instances have not stopped him from killing people. The official Hollyoaks website said of Silas: "Eep! Who knew that when Heidi’s cuddly dad Silas showed up in the village he would turn out to be the local serial killer with a penchant for strangulation?" They also call him a "killer grandad". Silas becomes more unstable and in October 2011, Rawle said "He's a psychopath and he has slightly lost the plot now. He's very dangerous. He thinks he hasn't got a lot of time left to live and feels he has nothing to lose."

== Development ==
=== India Longford's murder ===
In December 2010, it was announced that India Longford (Beth Kingston) would be murdered after an experiment with online dating goes "horribly wrong". Hollyoaks worked closely with the University of Central Lancashire's Cyberspace Research Unit on the storyline, in a bid to raise awareness of internet safety. Speaking on behalf of the Research Unit, Dr Jo Bryce commented: "If the storyline can remind one young person to protect themselves when engaging in online activity, then that can only be a positive thing. Too many youngsters think they are immune to online risks and this storyline is a reminder that you don't always know who you're talking to online." Hollyoaks series producer, Paul Marquess, added: "This is a terrifying murder that highlights the dangers of meeting strangers online. The storyline, which launches at Christmas, will take us right through 2011 and audiences will be gripped to find out if the dangerous killer will strike again." Marquess said he was surprised that the show had not done a big storyline about "stranger danger" on the internet before, branding it "absolutely key Hollyoaks territory". Hollyoaks writer, Steve Hughes, explained that the storyline was inspired by a real-life incident, where a friend had her identity stolen on social networking service Facebook.

India's friends start a game to see who can get the most dates online. India is initially sceptical and writes up a rules list because she is aware of the dangers. But when Silas, calling himself Cameron, starts talking to India online she is intrigued. Silas then sends a photo of Cameron and India thinks he is gorgeous. Kingston stated that India is excited and agrees to meet him with her friends as chaperones. Cameron does not turn up to the meeting, but suggests they meet somewhere else. Kingston said that "[India] thinks, what the heck? So she goes off ... to a horrible end." On her way to the meet Cameron, India is grabbed in a "dark and empty" alleyway and is murdered by Silas.

In January 2011, India's sister, Texas (Bianca Hendrickse-Spendlove), ends up at Silas's mercy after taking drugs to help get through India's funeral. Hendrickse-Spendlove explained the situation to Inside Soap, saying "Texas has sex with Doug to get cocaine and a cocktail of tranquillisers. But she's in such a state that she misses the funeral." Texas is a "complete wreck" and after she is thrown out of Chez Chez nightclub, Silas finds her and takes her to the woods. Hendrickse-Spendlove said that "It really looks like she's about to meet the same horrible fate as her sister". Silas eventually decides not to kill Texas. Commenting on Silas's decision, Hendrickse-Spendlove said "In her drugged-up state, Texas says it should have been her who died rather than sweet India. Silas feels a pang of guilt and tries to redeem himself by taking Texas to hospital." The actress added that even though Silas has let her off this time, he could strike again.

=== Jenny's murder ===
It was reported that Silas sets newcomer Jenny (Daisy Turner) in his sights as his next victim in April 2011. Jenny is in desperate need of money and decides to use her skills as a con artist and starts talking to a "rich old man" online, wanting to arrange a meeting, drug him and steal his wallet and cards. Jenny has no idea that she is talking to Silas. Rawle called it a "tantalising game of cat and mouse". Jenny thinks Silas is a millionaire who she can get the better of, and Silas thinks she will be a "soft" target for him. Rawle explained that the Hollyoaks team are keen to keep educating viewers about "stranger danger" on the internet. He said "It's an ongoing message we're trying to put out that the internet can be a dangerous place. Silas could be grooming up to 200 girls, waiting for just one to let down their guard - and that's where Jenny comes in." Jenny realises that Silas is not a "harmless pensioner" after she looks through his bag, which contains a rope, a knife and some gloves. Rawle opined that Jenny is a "very clever adversary" for Silas. Jenny is chased through the woods and realises that Silas has given her the drugged drink that was meant for him. Jenny starts to feel "woozy" and Rawle said that "there was no way that she could get away with drugging Silas". The actor added that Jenny would have to be "quite audacious" to outsmart someone who has been a killer for quite some time. Silas then murders Jenny. Jenny is revealed to be Rebecca Massey, the girlfriend of Doug Carter (PJ Brennan). Brennan hoped that Doug would be involved in Silas's downfall and said "I have my fingers crossed that Doug will be somehow involved, as I'd love him to be". Brennan also hoped that a "little bit of a Scooby Gang" would get together and solve the murders.

=== Feud with Lynsey Nolan ===
Silas sets his sights on Lynsey Nolan (Karen Hassan) as his next potential victim. Jamil Fadel (Sikander Malik) and Lee Hunter (Alex Carter) start their own radio show and recruit Lynsey to be their on-air agony aunt. Lynsey's advice to "sexually charged" young people does not go down well with Silas. Hassan said that Silas assumes the worst about Lynsey. Silas grows more furious when Lynsey dresses up in a sexy nurse's outfit for the radio's webcam. Lynsey is "horrified" as her flat becomes dark and Silas grabs her from behind. However, Silas is scared off as Lynsey's screams are heard by Silas's grandson, Riley Costello (Rob Norbury), who arrives to rescue her. Lynsey realises that it was Silas who attacked her and tells people, but they do not believe her. Discussing the plot, Bronagh Waugh (who plays Lynsey's best friend Cheryl Brady) explained that everyone thinks that Lynsey is crazy and making the allegation up. She said "Lynsey's really upset about it and asks Cheryl for some help. While she hates seeing her best friend in that kind of state, she thinks Lynsey's just being paranoid and Silas is a really upstanding member of society." As no one accepts Lynsey's allegation, she wants to bring Silas down even more. Hassan stated that Lynsey is determined to find the evidence she needs to expose Silas. Riley realises that Lynsey is telling the truth and confronts Silas, who has a heart attack. Riley brings Silas into hospital, but Lynsey is not sure whether Silas is genuinely ill. Lynsey is assigned as his nurse and withholds his oxygen mask until he admits that he attacked her. Heidi walks in on Lynsey withholding treatment from Silas and Lynsey calls for help. Norbury later told Digital Spy that he did not think Riley's suspicions of Silas would ever completely go and "everything that happened shook [Riley] up a bit".

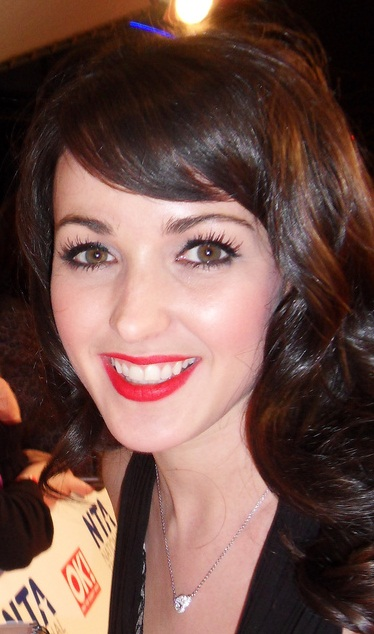
Karen Hassan plays Silas's nemesis, Lynsey Nolan

In March 2011, Hassan revealed that Silas sees an opportunity to get even with Lynsey when he sees her handing over diet pills to Cheryl. Lynsey buys the pills for Cheryl off the internet, which Hassan told All About Soap is "completely innocent". Silas sees Lynsey giving the pills to Cheryl and sees an opportunity to get his own back. Hassan explained that Silas's "evil instincts kick in once again" and he swaps Cheryl's pills for his own medication. Cheryl takes the wrong pills and ends up collapsing. Lynsey and Cheryl's employee, Rhys Ashworth (Andrew Moss), find Cheryl slumped unconscious. Hassan said that "It's a terrifying moment for Lynsey, who's overcome with guilt for putting her best friend in hospital". The doctors tell Lynsey that a high level of sedative has been found in Cheryl's blood, but Lynsey is completely flummoxed by how it could have got there. Hassan continued that it does not cross Lynsey's mind that Silas would want to hurt Cheryl, but opined that "the penny will eventually drop for her". The actress added that Silas is trying to "blacken" Lynsey's name. Discussing the storyline, Waugh later promised that there would be some "really good" stuff coming up. She told Inside Soap, "Silas will continue to run amok and that's going to build to a big crescendo. Lots of people in the village are involved with the storyline, so that's what we're working towards at the moment."

Lynsey gets back into Silas's "bad books" when he finds her looking at his hospital records. Silas then tries to scare Lynsey off with a menacing warning. In August 2011, Rawle confirmed that Silas would start terrorising Lynsey. Rawle explained that Silas is intent on discrediting Lynsey as she knows he is a killer. He said "[Silas's] job over the next few weeks, it's like a war of attrition - [He is] going to wear her down and send her mad." Lynsey is determined to see Silas punished for his crimes as the investigation into India's murder gathers pace. Of this, Hassan told Inside Soap "When Silas realises that Lynsey is on his case again, he basically tells her to bring it on." Silas "gets off" on the idea that Lynsey is trying to stop him from killing again and Hassan said "it makes the game a lot more interesting". Lynsey's suspicions are reconfirmed when she sees Silas among the press at a televised appeal about India's attacker. Lynsey frames Silas by planting India's necklace on him before ringing the police anonymously. Hassan said that Lynsey hopes Silas's "web of lies" will unravel. Lynsey's attempt to frame him backfires.

Silas plots to discredit Lynsey by making it seem as if she is having a breakdown. Silas plans to send Lynsey mad so that no one will listen to her. Rawle said that Silas delights in the idea that Lynsey thinks she is good enough to play him. Silas puts a webcam in Lynsey's flat in order to watch her. He sneaks into the house and plays tricks on Lynsey by turning the gas on and writing a "sinister" message on her mirror with lipstick. Of this, Rawle explained: "Silas alters Lynsey's reality – so when she insists that one thing is happening, it appears not to be the case the next minute." Silas sneaks into Lynsey's flat at night and moves her things around which Rawle said is "a subtle way of sending a person barmy". Lynsey's friends do not believe her accusations and question her state of mind, so she leaves the village. Lynsey's friend, Brendan Brady (Emmett J. Scanlan), sees Silas watching Lynsey as she is leaving and Hassan said that "[Brendan] starts to think there's something odd about him".

In September 2011, Lynsey becomes intrigued when Texas tells her that she is receiving messages from a girl on the internet dating website that India used. Lynsey is convinced that Silas is posing as the girl and goes through Texas's phone to make contact with the girl. Lynsey arranges to meet with the girl and convinces journalist Nancy Hayton (Jessica Fox) to come with her. However, Lynsey is left alone after Silas sends Nancy on a job at the last minute and the girl does not arrive. Lynsey arranges another meeting with the girl. Lynsey realises she is in the woods with Silas alone and Hassan said that Lynsey is "absolutely terrified".

=== Rae Wilson's murder ===
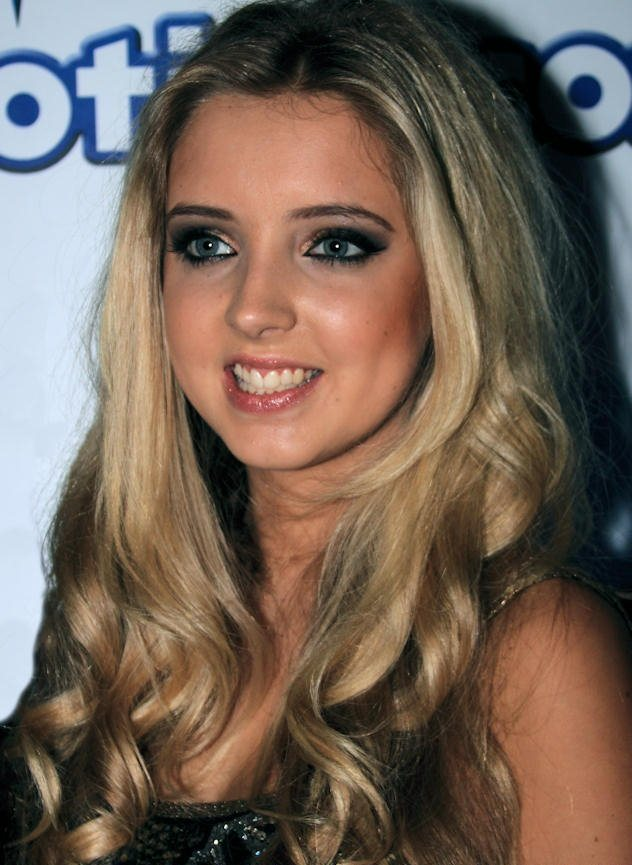
Alice Barlow plays Silas's third victim, Rae Wilson

In August 2011, a video was leaked containing footage of Silas supposedly preparing to attack Theresa McQueen (Jorgie Porter) at a night-time rave. This led viewers to believe that Theresa would become Silas's next victim. It was then revealed that Silas would feature in the fourth series of the Hollyoaks late-night spin-off Hollyoaks Later. It was confirmed that Silas would line Theresa up as his next victim. Porter said it was "amazing" to be involved in the storyline. The storyline begins when Theresa's aunt, Myra McQueen (Nicole Barber-Lane), inappropriately touches Silas and blames it on Theresa. This puts Theresa in danger as Silas targets girls who he is unhappy with because of their behaviour. Silas hates girls who are promiscuous and Porter opined that Theresa is "probably a prime suspect" as she enjoys receiving men's attention. Theresa signs up for an online dating website as she wants to find love. Theresa's love interest, Will Savage (James Atherton), learns of this and talks to Silas about it. Porter stated that Silas is being "clever" as he befriends Will while plotting against Theresa. Silas encourages Will to set up a fake profile on the website to check on Theresa. Will creates an online alter ego named Juan which Silas is involved with. Theresa makes contact with the profile online, not realising she is putting herself in danger. Porter said that it "scary and worrying" but would not confirm whether Silas kills Theresa. Hollyoaks series producer, Emma Smithwick, confirmed that the spin-off would feature the death of a regular character.

When the episodes aired, Silas does not murder Theresa and in a dark storyline twist, Rae Wilson (Alice Barlow) becomes his next victim. Viewers were not informed that Barlow was leaving the show and Rae's departure storyline was kept secret. Rae tells Silas that Brendan has threatened to kill her. She annoys Silas by telling him she plans to use men for flings after being hurt too many times. Silas realises he has an opportunity to frame Brendan. Silas brutally beats Rae and strangles her to death in an alleyway. In the months leading up to her exit, viewers began to speculate that Rae would become the Silas's next victim. Barlow had to attempt to discredit the rumours and denied speculation that she was leaving Hollyoaks. She did this because she wanted viewers to be "surprised and shocked" by her exit. Barlow said the fact that Rae's death aired in late night episodes of the serial made an opportunity to be creative with the content. There were "no limits" and they could "do whatever they wanted with it". The actress described Rae's death scene as "absolutely incredible" and said she loved working with Rawle. On-screen Silas plans to frame Brendan for Rae's murder and places her body in Brendan's car. Silas also plants the murder weapon in Brendan's bedroom. Brendan is arrested and charged for Rae's murder after evidence is found against him.

=== Storyline climax ===
In August 2011, Rawle revealed that Silas's storyline would soon come to a conclusion. He told This Morning "[...] We've been waiting a long time to see what's going to happen with Silas and over the next three months we've got some cracking storylines which end in an awful climax, which I can't say anything about." The actor also opined that Silas's family would be "ripped asunder" after finding out that he is a killer. Marquess first mentioned the storyline's climax in January 2011. He told Digital Spy "I know what the ending of the serial killer story will be, when it is, and I know how brilliant it is. I'm hoping that story will have the audience jumping up and down and shouting at the telly, because it's got a really big 'look behind you' element to it."

==== Mercedes McQueen ====
In May 2011, Silas takes a dislike to Riley's fiancé, Mercedes McQueen (Jennifer Metcalfe), after he learns of her promiscuity. Silas attempts and fails to attack Mercedes with a candlestick when her back is turned. Metcalfe later hinted that Mercedes may have to watch her back in the future when it comes to Silas. She said "[Silas] is a tough cookie, isn't he? I think every girl in the village needs to watch their back where Silas is concerned..." In October 2011, it was reported that Silas would hold Mercedes captive in a vault. Silas decides to teach heavily pregnant Mercedes a lesson after she confesses to an affair with Riley's father, Carl Costello (Paul Opacic). Silas's plan is to keep Mercedes alive until she has given birth and then murder her. Metcalfe called the plot "brilliant" and said it was "quite flattering" to be trusted with it. The actress explained that Mercedes thinks that she is going to die whilst being help captive. Mercedes also fears that her baby is going to die. Metcalfe said that it does not take long for Mercedes to realise that Silas is responsible for the recent murders. Silas wants to keep the baby alive, but not Mercedes. Therefore, Silas does the "bare minimum" for Mercedes, giving her water, a small amount of food and keeping her warm. Daniel Kilkelly of Digital Spy opined that storyline sounds "really dark" and asked Metcalfe whether Hollyoaks are pushing the boundaries with it. Metcalfe revealed that "they are a little bit", saying "It's all shot in a very clever way, so it was fine when it came to compliance. But it was difficult and there was a lot of stuff that we had to be really careful about when we were filming it." Metcalfe would not reveal whether Mercedes survives her encounter with Silas.

==== Halloween ====
In October 2011, Silas tells Lynsey that he is planning to murder again and that she has until midnight on Halloween to identify his next victim. He promises Lynsey that if she works out who his next victim is he will confess his crimes to the police, but if she fails another girl will die. Lynsey has to go along with Silas's mind game after everyone still refuses to believe her claims about him. Hassan explained that Silas does not care if he gets caught or perishes in the process. He reminds Lynsey of his plan by sending her clues and presents, such as a chess queen and a pumpkin containing the message "Tick tock, time is running out". Lynsey confides in Doug and tells him what Silas is doing. Silas picks out four potential victims: Lynsey, Texas, Theresa and Amy Barnes (Ashley Slanina-Davies). He then marks each one of them with chess pieces which are planted in their homes or bags. Silas sends Lynsey a Catwoman outfit with an instruction to wear it at the fancy dress Halloween party at Chez Chez nightclub. Lynsey confides in Doug and tells him what Silas is planning and Brennan said he was "very, very happy" to be involved in the storyline again. Doug believes Lynsey, of which Hassan said "On one hand, she feels like she shouldn't be dragging [Doug] into this mess, but she knows that she needs someone on her side". The actress added that Lynsey cannot believe her luck as Doug show her kindness and friendship and she wonders why she did not confide in him months ago. Rawle revealed that nobody in the village is safe, saying "Theresa's already in his sights, Lynsey is a possible and so is Mercedes - he really doesn't like the McQueens!" He added that there are "lots of other women" whose morals Silas would find questionable.

On-screen, Silas accidentally murders his daughter, Heidi Costello (Kim Tiddy). Silas reveals to Lynsey that she was his intended victim and vows to kill her. When Lynsey manages to escape from Silas, he follows her and confuses Heidi with Lynsey as they are wearing identical Catwoman costumes. Silas hits Heidi, who he mistakes for Lynsey, over the head with a brick, before strangling her to death. Silas is devastated when he realises that he has killed Heidi. The Daily Star had previously reported that Silas would kill Heidi, but this was not confirmed by Hollyoaks producers. Tiddy called the storyline "fantastic" and said the twist of Silas killing Heidi was "great". Tiddy opined that Heidi's death would affect Silas, saying "I think we'll see some remorse from him, as killing Heidi was a genuine mistake, and that's what is so great about the storyline. I hope we see some remorse!"

=== 2012 return ===
On 18 June 2012, Rawle was pictured on a night out with the cast, which started speculation that Silas would return. The following day a paparazzo travelled to the set of Hollyoaks where he managed to picture Rawle with reading scripts. Digital Spy's Kilkelly reported that the cast been celebrating Rawle's "shock comeback". It was later confirmed Rawle would return and a promotional video featuring his character was released. Rawle explained the reason for Silas's return to the serial saying that "there was still more to explore" and there were "unanswered questions" within the storyline. A week before Silas's return Lynsey was killed off in a whodunnit storyline with Silas becoming a suspect in the murder. It was later confirmed that initial scenes will feature Texas visiting Silas at the psychiatric hospital to try to find answers for Lynsey's murder after it is feared the case is related to Silas. Soon after it emerged Silas's later scenes will feature his escape from hospital.

Rawle explained that Silas has accepted he is to be in the secure psychiatric unit until he dies so he plans to manipulate the outside world from inside as a means of living out his murderous fantasies. Rawle revealed that Silas has a "nagging feeling" that he made a mistake in killing India and that he wishes he could put it right. He said that his character meant to murder Texas so he now wants to kill her as she is the "one that got away". Hendrickse-Spendlove also commented that Silas initially intended to kill Texas so she is "the final piece of the puzzle for him, and then his 'work' will be complete". Silas tells Texas another murder will soon occur which is an opportunity to "play games". He is "delighted" to have an audience during the visits and begins to "make lots of threats". Rawle explained that Silas sees that Texas has India's ring which is "symbolic" for Silas as he had previously taken it as a trophy. Texas taunts Silas with the ring and agrees to exchange it for information on Lynsey's murder. Rawle explained that Silas tells Texas that Will Savage (James Atherton) is responsible for Lynsey's murder which is because "Silas knows that Texas and Will are close, so he points the finger of suspicion his way". He said that Silas would "put quite a few people in the frame" for the murder. Hendrickse-Spendlove said that Texas is "manipulated" by Silas when he makes her believe Will is responsible for Lynsey's murder. Silas escapes from hospital and goes to visit Texas. Hendrickse-Spendlove explained that Texas "opens her front door, sees Silas and thinks, 'This is it - my life is over', to see him standing there with no police restraint, knowing that he murdered her sister India, is absolutely petrifying". Silas tells Texas that he now intends to complete what he began. Hendrickse-Spendlove would not reveal whether Texas survives the ordeal but said that Texas is "never going to be safe again" regardless of the outcome. In August 2012, Laura-Jayne Tyler from Inside Soap confirmed that there were no current plans for Silas to return, but the door had been left open for him.

=== 2016 return ===
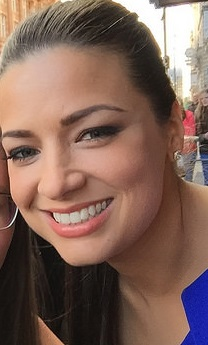
Sophie Austin (pictured) plays Lindsey Roscoe, who teams up with Silas in 2016.

The character was reintroduced in January 2016 as part of the show's latest serial killer story. Producers kept his return under a press embargo to surprise viewers and Rawle filmed his return on a weekend. The actor was surprised to be invited back to the show as he believed that Silas would never return, especially after four years. Silas returns when he visits Trevor Royle (Greg Wood) in prison after he is arrested for a series of murders. He poses under the alias "Mister E Mann", a writer interested in the case. Upon speaking to Trevor, he realises that he is innocent and leaves. Silas' return ties in with the show's long-running "Gloved Hand Killer" storyline, where doctor Lindsey Roscoe (Sophie Austin) has killed multiple characters. A trailer released on 27 January 2016 confirmed that Silas would appear again in upcoming episodes as he searches for the killer. Silas appears at Dee Valley Hospital to seek more information about the murders, where he speaks to nurse Tegan Lomax (Jessica Ellis). Ellis enjoyed working with Rawle and admitted that she thought that the killer could be Silas before it was revealed to be Lindsey. The actress revealed that Silas would continue to appear as he becomes "desperate for answers".

Silas' return builds towards the conclusion of the Gloved Hand Killer story. Rawle liked the story and thought it was a "really good idea" with a surprising ending. Austin teased that her character may work with Silas in "explosive scenes". This was later confirmed via a promotional video. A show spokesperson said that Silas teams up with Lindsey in "a tale of old buried grudges and new nemeses". Silas and Lindsey eventually meet when he poses as a HR representative at the hospital. He tells Lindsey that he is admires her career, suggesting that he knows she is the killer. Following this, Hollyoaks released a promotional image of Silas and Lindsey. Austin's departure from the series was announced on 20 March 2016. She confirmed that Silas and Mercedes would feature in her exit, calling it "tense" and "exciting". When Lindsey is exposed as the killer, she goes on the run with help from Silas. Daisy Wood-Davis, who portrays Lindsey's sister Kim Butterfield, told Charlotte Tutton of OK! that she would star opposite Rawle as part of the story. The scenes feature Kim arranging to meet a man online - revealed to be Silas - after seeking answers about Lindsey.

Writers created a showdown for Silas and Mercedes as part of his return stint. A promotional clip of the meeting was released on the show's social media featuring the pair playing chess to decide on whether she lives or dies. Rawle explained that Silas blames Mercedes for the breakdown of his own family and believes that he should have killed her when he was able to. As they play chess, Silas notices Mercedes' necklace and they discuss the stillbirth of her son Gabriel McQueen. Rawle ruled out another return for Silas unless he was offered a "very strong storyline".

== Reception ==
For his portrayal of Silas, Rawle received a nomination in the "Villain of the Year" category at the 2011 British Soap Awards. In 2012 he received a British Soap Awards nomination in the category of "Best Villain". At the All About Soap Bubble Awards Silas won "Best Villain" and the scenes in which he murdered Heidi won the "Best Episode" award. Digital Spy readers voted the Silas storyline the "Best Soap Storyline" of 2011 in a poll run by the entertainment website.

Kilkelly described India's murder episodes as "unmissable" and "two of the strongest episodes of the year". He later labelled Silas "one of [Hollyoaks'] best ever villains". In a poll run by Digital Spy, Texas visiting Silas was voted the plot viewers were most looking forward to with 63.1% of the total votes. The following week readers voted Silas's escape as the storyline they were most looking forward to watching with 64.2% of the total vote. Tutton (OK!) named Silas "possibly the creepiest villain in soap". A Digital Spy journalist dubbed Silas and Lindsey "the most murderous duo of them all". In March 2016, Sophie Dainty from the website named the character the worst soap villain currently appearing in a British soap opera, and the second worst male soap villain of all time. She called Silas "without a doubt the most cold-blooded psychopath in Soapland".

In 2016, Rawle revealed that the character had received a "cult following", which surprised him due to Silas' murderous ways. He called Silas "the ultimate baddie" with "no redeeming features whatsoever" and dubbed him "almost Dickensian".

Norbury (Riley) opined that it was "unbelievable" to work with Rawle, saying "You can learn everything from Jeff - he's been there, done it and he knows everyone!" Kingston (who plays India) called Rawle "amazing" and said she was pleased upon learning that he would play Silas. Kilkelly of Digital Spy praised Rawle's performance, stating: "Jeff Rawle [...] does a fantastic job of portraying the dual role of the affable older man and sinister killer. He should definitely be one to watch out for as he becomes a more permanent fixture in the village in the weeks ahead." Rachel Shenton (who plays Mitzeee) described Rawle as "brilliant" and said the storyline is "really interesting". In September 2011, Porter (Theresa) praised Rawle, calling him a "brilliant actor". Barlow (Rae) said Rawle was "amazing" and a "dream come true" to work with. Hassan (Lynsey) praised Rawle, saying she really enjoyed working with him. She said "Jeff has the ability to turn any scene into a really great, gritty scene, so for me it's been like taking a masterclass, really."
