= Carl Costello =

Fictional character from Hollyoaks

- Hollyoaks character
- Portrayed by: Paul Opacic
- Duration: 2010–2013, 2018
- First appearance: 19 July 2010
- Last appearance: 16 November 2018
- Introduced by: Paul Marquess (2010); Emma Smithwick (2012); Bryan Kirkwood (2013, 2018)
- Spin-off appearances: Hollyoaks Later (2010)
In-universe information
- Occupation: Footballer; Pub landlord (2010–2011); Businessman (2010–18)
- Brothers: Trev Costello
- Wife: Heidi Costello (until 2011)
- Sons: Riley Costello; Seth Costello; Jason Costello
- Daughters: Jem Costello
- Grandsons: Bobby Costello; Phoenix Costello

Carl Costello is a fictional character from the Channel 4 soap opera Hollyoaks, played by Paul Opacic. The character was introduced by executive producer Paul Marquess and he debuted on screen during the episode broadcast on 19 July 2010. Carl arrived in the village as the new owner of The Dog in the Pond and the father of established character Jem Costello (Helen Russell-Clark). Carl departed from Hollyoaks on 1 December 2011 with his son Jason Costello (Victoria Atkin). Opacic later reprised his role and returned to Hollyoaks on 26 September 2012 and left again on the 5 October 2012. Opacic reprised his role once more in January 2013, which coincided with the exit of Mitzeee Minniver (Rachel Shenton). He returned on 25 January 2013 and departed again on 15 February 2013. Opacic returned again for a guest appearance on 10 July 2018, which ended in his character being murdered by an unknown assailant on 11 July of that year. He reappeared via a flashback on 16 November 2018, which revealed Breda McQueen (Moya Brady) to be his killer.

== Creation and casting ==
Lucy Allan quit the role of executive producer in January 2010, Paul Marquess is then quickly employed as her replacement. Marquess revealed his plans to give Hollyoaks a "shake up", and initiated a cast cull along with the introduction of several new characters. In April 2010 Marquees announced his intentions to introduce the Costello family. Speaking about the new family Marquees stated "They're only one of three families. They're family number two. The thing about the Costellos is that The Dog has to be somewhere the audience wants to be. [...] I'm not saying the Costellos won't have serious stories but I think you'll want to be there." He branded Carl and Heidi Costello (Kim Tiddy) as good looking. The Costellos were a built on family to the already established Jem Costello (Helen Russell-Clark). Opacic was cast in the role and during an interview with E4 he stated: "It's a very exciting time at Hollyoaks right now. Paul Marquess has got a proven track record, and I think it's turned the whole thing around. [...] It seems like a re-birth of Hollyoaks."

== Development ==
=== Characterisation ===
E4 publicity describe him as being "self-assured smooth operator who's charming, but will play things underhand." Opacic brands Carl a "legendary philanderer" and a "naughty boy" but defends him stating "He would never leave Heidi, he loves her enormously, but he just can't help himself." He also calls Carl a "bit of a dinosaur" when it comes to sensitive issues such as Jamine's identity issues. Remaining optimistic of Carl's views he stated: "He might become a new man and start to be more understanding, I'm sure it will be a huge learning process for him." E4 later shed more light on Carl during the third series of Hollyoaks Later, adding that he "is known for his fiery temper." The series also revealed that Carl had injured a footballer in his backstory, which ended the footballer's career and saw the Costello family being targeted for revenge.

=== Initial returns ===
On 1 August 2012, Opacic's management revealed that he had reprised his role of Carl and had begun filming his return scenes. Carl will appear from September 2012. Tom Eames from Digital Spy later revealed that Carl would return when his grandson Bobby Costello goes missing. A show insider explained "Carl agrees to put aside his differences to be there for his son and Mercedes" upon his return.

On 20 December 2012, it was announced that Rachel Shenton would be leaving her role of Mitzeee in 2012 and that Carl would return as part of her exit storyline. It was revealed that the storyline would feature Carl returning to seek justice for Riley's death and that he would enlist Mitzeee in helping him punish Simon Walker (Neil Newbon). An official statement by Hollyoaks teased that Mitzeee could get a happy ending or that it was possible "her involvement with Carl has put her life in danger". Carl returned on 25 January 2013.

=== 2018 return and death ===
On 1 July 2018, it was announced that Opacic had reprised his role, over five years after his last appearance. Carl returns for "an explosive comeback" as part of Mercedes' return storyline. It was reported that Carl would return after Mercedes takes Bobby from him in America. He then makes a public appeal for Bobby to be returned to him, before appearing at the McQueen house looking for Bobby. It was confirmed on 2 July that Opacic's return is a guest stint. When he fails to retrieve Bobby, a "desperate" Carl kidnaps Goldie McQueen (Chelsee Healey), making fans fear for her. However, Carl soon regrets kidnapping "one of the most outspoken McQueens". Carl then tries to trade Goldie for Bobby, but the McQueens outsmart him, with Goldie hitting him in the groin.

Carl is then killed off on the episode that aired on 11 July 2018, when he is hit on the head by an unknown character in the woods. It was initially not revealed whether Carl was dead or alive. He was later confirmed dead when his body was found weeks later by three other characters. Mercedes, who had left Carl a threatening voice message on the day of his death, is initially arrested for his murder, but soon released due to a lack of evidence; however, one of Carl's buttons is found sewn onto one of Bobby's toys, casting suspicious that Mercedes may still be the killer. Sylver McQueen (David Tag), who had threatened Carl before his death, is also briefly arrested on suspicion of his murder. Carl's murder remained a mystery to viewers over the summer of 2018. In September, Hollyoaks producer Bryan Kirkwood revealed that Carl's killer would be revealed that November, with Kirkwood teasing that "The discovery of who killed [Carl] is I think one of the moments of the year, and is part of a very exciting time in the show for Mercedes, Russ and Sylver." The reveal took place in a special hour-long episode focussing on Mercedes' wedding, with Daniel Kilkelly from Digital Spy commenting that Carl's death "continues to cast a shadow over the [McQueen] family" due to them remaining "top suspects" for the crime. The episode, broadcast on 16 November 2018, revealed Sylver's mother Breda McQueen (Moya Brady) as the killer, with it being confirmed that Breda is a "new sinister serial killer" as she was also revealed to have killed two other characters in the episode. The episode also marked the last appearance of Carl, who appeared in a flashback scene which revealed Breda as the killer. Carl's death marked the beginning of Breda's killing spree.

== Storylines ==
Carl is an ex-premiership footballer, whose first wife died when his daughter Jem (Helen Russell-Clark) was young, he then went on to marry Heidi (Kim Tiddy), with whom he has three more children; Riley (Rob Norbury), Seth (Miles Higson) and Jasmine (Victoria Atkin).

Carl first arrives in Hollyoaks after buying The Dog. Jem is not happy to discover her father has moved to Hollyoaks, but agrees to forgive him for breaking her ex-boyfriend Liam's legs, which ended his football career, and for having numerous affairs. Carl is shocked to see his previous fling, glamour model Mitzeee (Rachel Shenton) in the village. Mitzeee, who is Heidi's cousin, begins to flirt with Carl, who rejects her. When Mitzeee reveals Jasmine's relationship with Bart McQueen (Jonny Clarke), Carl is angry and threatens him. However, Jem convinces him to calm down. Carl becomes suspicious of Doug Carter (PJ Brennan), believing he is dealing drugs. When this is proved true, Carl forces him to move away from Hollyoaks. Mitzeee reveals to Heidi that she slept with Carl. Jem rejects her father, and is angered when Heidi forgives him.

It's later revealed Carl broke Jem's ex-boyfriend Liam McAllister's (Chris Overton) leg to ruin his football career, Jem could not cope with this and left to go travelling. Carl continues to push Riley into training for football. Riley and Seth go cage fighting with Liam and his brother Nathan McAllister (Michael Bisping), they go to a party where they lock them in a cage. They kidnap Carl and make him watch his children beat each other, whilst Carl stands on a box with a rope around his neck. He escapes and Nathan dies.

Jem decides to leave the village when she tries and fails to set Carl up with Mitzeee Carl finally lets her go. With Jem gone Carl becomes more obsessive about his other children. Over Christmas, Carl's daughter Jasmine reveals she wants to be a boy called Jason. Carl is upset about it at first but soon begins to accept Jason.

Carl is unhappy when Riley starts dating new barmaid, Mercedes McQueen (Jennifer Metcalfe). Carl kisses Mercedes and later offers her money to stop seeing Riley which she rejects. Carl begins sleeping with Mercedes until Carl finds out Heidi has also been having an affair with Gaz Bennett (Joel Goonan). Carl forgives Heidi after threatening Gaz. Seth finds out about Carl's own affair but is stopped revealing all to Heidi and Riley by Mercedes lying that she's pregnant. Mercedes sister, Jacqui McQueen (Claire Cooper), also finds out about the affair but Carl manages her to convince her to keep quiet by offering her husband, Rhys Ashworth (Andrew Moss), a job.

Much to Carl's horror, Warren Fox (Jamie Lomas) discovers Carl's affair with Mercedes and blackmails Carl into giving him £50,000 or he will reveal the affair to Riley during the wedding. Carl frantically attempts to gather some money together. On the day of the wedding, Mercedes' guilt becomes too much to bear and she tells a furious Riley about the affair at the altar, and apologises but says that she cannot marry him. Afterwards, unknown to everyone, who believe that Mercedes is in Dubai on the honeymoon, she was actually kidnapped by Riley's grandfather Silas Blissett (Jeff Rawle), who plans to kill her once she gives birth. Mercedes is eventually found and she gives birth to a boy, whom she names Bobby McQueen. After a paternity test, it is revealed that Riley is Bobby's biological father.

After Riley disowns Carl, he decides that there is no future for him in Chester and decides to emigrate to America, and asks Jason and Seth if they would like to join him. Seth refuses, unable to forgive his father, but Jason decides that there is a better future for him out there and agrees to go with his father. After saying their goodbyes, and Carl makes an emotional apology to Riley, Jason and Carl leave for America, and are last seen boarding the aeroplane. Carl returns when he learns Mercedes and Riley are getting married and attempts to persuade Riley not to marry Mercedes. Mercedes hears a conversation between Riley and Carl in which Riley admits that he does not love Mercedes and that he recently had sex with Mitzeee. Bobby is abducted with Mitzeee as the prime suspect. Mercedes accuses Mitzeee of kidnapping Bobby later a letter is delivered to Riley asking for half a million pounds ransom money. Riley asks Carl for help and he says he can only give £200,000 as the rest of his money is tied up in investments. Riley discovers Mercedes kidnapped Bobby and she is arrested before she is taken to a psychiatric unit. Riley is shot and killed by Walker. Bobby is left without either parent so is left with Mercedes' mother Myra McQueen (Nicole Barber-Lane). Carl decides Myra is not the right guardian for Bobby and she agrees Bobby would be better living with Carl. Carl returns to America with Bobby.

When Mitzeee continues to struggle with Riley's death, her sister Maxine Minniver (Nikki Sanderson) rings Carl for help. Carl returns to the village but is unaware that Walker has also returned. Carl convinces Mitzeee to move to America and she agrees. In February 2014, Maxine went to visit Carl, Seth and Jason for a while, followed by abuse from her boyfriend Patrick Blake, and in 2015, Myra went to visit Carl and Bobby for a while following Carmel's death and Mercedes' disappearance. In November 2015, Mercedes and Joe went to visit him so Joe could meet Bobby for the first time, following the death of their stillborn son Gabriel. Mercedes told her mother that Carl and Mitzeee forgives her for what she has done. In 2016, Maxine called Carl and Mitzeee and told them that she buried Patrick at the wall, with Darren, and with this caused, she decided to visit them for a week, and in September, Maxine later called Carl, Mitzeee and her family and told them that the police had found Patrick's body.

In 2018, Mercedes kidnaps Bobby and brings him to the village, revealing that Carl is an alcoholic and that Mitzeee has left him. The McQueens realise what has happened when Carl makes a national television appeal to bring Bobby home. Carl returns to the village to reclaim Bobby and tries to force his way into the McQueens but is told off by Sylver McQueen (David Tag). Carl kidnaps Goldie McQueen (Chelsee Healey) and takes her hostage in order to exchange her for Bobby, but the McQueens outsmart him. The McQueens arrive home and discover that Maxine and Bobby are missing and it turns out that Maxine is working with Carl. Maxine gives Bobby to Carl but Mitzeee calls her and reveals the truth and a horrified Maxine tries to stop Carl but is too late. Sylver and Hunter McQueen (Theo Graham) are furious at Carl kidnapping Goldie and head out to get Carl. Maxine confides in Glenn Donovan (Bob Cryer) about being tricked and Glenn promises to make him pay. Carl and Bobby run through the woods but Bobby manages to escape from Carl and runs away. Carl falls over before he is hit over the head and killed by an unknown assailant. Weeks later, his body in the woods. Mercedes is initially arrested for his murder but is quickly released. In November, Carl's killer is revealed to be serial killer Breda McQueen (Moya Brady).

== Reception ==
Soap opera reporting website Holy Soap describe Carl's most memorable moment as being: "When his wife Heidi was left devastated when it emerged he had slept with Cheryl Cole lookalike Mitzeee." E4 ran a poll asking viewers if they think Carl can be trusted, the results showed that more than half felt he couldn't. In 2018, Stephanie Chase from Digital Spy commented on Hollyoaks fans' reaction to Carl kidnapping Goldie, writing that "while kidnapping is never usually funny, these two made for an hilarious pairing for viewers". Chase's colleague, Daniel Kilkelly, wrote that Carl was killed by Breda as he was a "wrong'un who needed to be dealt with". Laura Donaldson from OK! called Carl's murder scene "shocking" and speculated that Mercedes could be his killer. Lewis Panther from the Daily Mirror called Carl "Sleezy" and a "bed-hopping, married ex-footballer", as well as calling his affair with Mercedes "passionate". In 2020, a writer from Inside Soap called the character "doomed".
