= Texas Longford =

UK soap opera character (created 2010)

- Hollyoaks character
- Portrayed by: Bianca Hendrickse-Spendlove
- Duration: 2010–2013
- First appearance: 17 May 2010
- Last appearance: 13 May 2013
- Introduced by: Lucy Allan and Paul Marquess
- Spin-off appearances: Hollyoaks: Freshers (2010)
In-universe information
- Other names: Texas Savage
- Occupation: Student (2010–2013)
- Father: Teddy Longford
- Mother: Melody Longford
- Sisters: India Longford
- Husband: Will Savage (2013)
- Grandfathers: Alistair Longford
- Grandmothers: Pamela Longford
- Other relatives: Blanche Longford

Texas Savage (also Longford) is a fictional character from the British Channel 4 soap opera Hollyoaks, played by Bianca Hendrickse-Spendlove. She debuted on-screen during the episode airing on 17 May 2010. Texas was introduced by producer Paul Marquess as the on-screen sister of India Longford (Beth Kingston). Texas was initially portrayed as a "quite light and quite daft" character. Her first main storyline began in the aftermath of India's murder, her subsequent grief storyline and later being targeted by Silas Blissett. Texas has also featured in the online spin-off series, Hollyoaks: Freshers. In February 2013 it was announced that Texas would depart the serial as she was murdered in a "whodunit" storyline. She departed in a flashback on 13 May 2013 after it was revealed her husband, Will Savage (James Atherton), had pushed her out of the window at the wedding venue.

== Character creation and casting ==
The character's arrival was announced in early May 2010. Texas was introduced as the sister of established character India Longford (Beth Kingston), initially appearing from 17 May. It was later revealed that Bianca Hendrickse-Spendlove was a regular cast member. Texas was one of many new characters which were introduced during Paul Marquess' revamp of the series. Texas is Hendrickse-Spendlove's first ongoing television role. A spokesperson from Hollyoaks said: "Texas is always causing trouble. She's very beautiful and always gets her own way with men, which drives India insane."

== Development ==
=== Characterisation ===
Texas is described on the serial's official website as bursting into the series "much to her sister's horror". Texas was said to "wreak even more havoc" during her stay at university. Texas often wants what India has got and has good intentions but "just can't help getting herself into trouble". Texas does not care about the way she looks, but always manages to look "fantastic". As a "force of nature" she almost has a "super-natural ability to make other people feel good about themselves". Texas is slightly fragile and vulnerable. She has a backstory of relationships with mad men, faced drug problems and has been bankrupted. She's had bad boyfriends, drug problems and been bankrupted. In 2012, series producer Emma Smithwick told Gareth McLean from Radio Times that there were not enough "strong, smart and intelligent women" in the series and the only female she would spend time with was Texas.

=== Silas Blissett's murder spree ===
In December 2010, Marquess said that viewers would see a new side to Texas after India is murdered. Texas arranges an online date and is unaware that it is Silas Blissett (Jeff Rawle). It was reported in The Belfast Telegraph that the storyline would begin with "rebellious" Texas ignoring "sensible" India's concerns about internet safety. However, when India notices that Texas' date is attractive, she ignores her own advice and meets up with him. India is then murdered. Marquess opined that it was interesting to see Texas cope with tragedy because she was "quite a new character in the show" and up that point had been "quite light and quite daft". Marquess added that Texas wrongly feels responsible for India's murder. The storyline is about "dealing with really, really strong emotions when you're relatively young." Texas begins sleeping with Doug Carter (PJ Brennan), drinking and taking cocaine to cope. Hendrickse-Spendlove told a columnist for TVTimes that Texas has never had to organise a funeral before, so she is a "headless chicken" trying to deal with everything. It all "gets to much" for Texas and she sleeps with Doug and forces him to get her some cocaine. Texas' self-destructive behaviour gets worse and lands her into trouble with Silas. Texas is a "complete wreck" and misses India's funeral. She "takes some pills, goes to the pub and drinks"; then Silas finds her passed out and takes her into the woods. Hendrickse-Spendlove said that it was the "perfect opportunity" for Silas to kill her character, but when Texas reveals that she was the original dating contact, Silas realises that he killed the wrong sister. The actress told Inside Soap's reporter that Silas "feels a pang of guilt and tries to redeem himself by taking Texas to hospital". She warned viewers that next time Texas may not be as lucky.

Silas later attempts to lure Texas into danger once again. However, his enemy Lynsey Nolan (Karen Hassan) knows he is the killer and attempts to defuse the situation. Hassan told Inside Soap that Texas is in contact over the internet with a girl going through "a similar trauma". Texas repeats something her friend said and Lynsey realises that Silas has previously said the same thing. Lynsey realises that Silas is "out to get Texas" and arranges a meeting. When Lynsey arrives she is met with Silas and she hits him with a brick. The serial later revealed that Silas would commit another murder on during Halloween. They revealed that his victim would be either Texas, Lynsey, Theresa McQueen (Jorgie Porter) or Amy Barnes (Ashley Slanina-Davies). Silas sets Lynsey a challenge to discover the identity of the victim and he will hand himself in. Hollyoaks released a picture of Silas' victim which revealed that they were dressed in a Catwoman outfit. In addition they released another promotional image showing the four character dressed in matching Catwoman outfits. However, the promotional campaign was used as a red herring to conceal the actual victim, Heidi Costello (Kim Tiddy).

=== Relationship with Dodger and Jodie ===
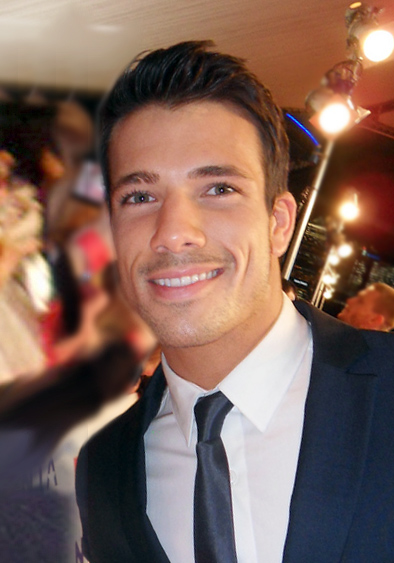
Danny Mac (pictured) said that Texas, Dodger and Jodie initially share a "friends with benefits" relationship.

Texas' casual relationship with Dodger Savage (Danny Mac) develops further when he starts sleeping with Jodie Wilde (Montana Manning), which makes Texas jealous. Jodie later reveals that she is attracted to someone else and kisses Texas. The storyline was promoted via a special Valentine's Day advert; which features Texas, Jodie and Dodger kissing each other. As the storyline develops; Texas and Dodger agree to help Jodie out with her dance assignment. However, Texas cannot dance and Theresa takes her place. Hendrickse-Spendlove told Inside Soap's reporter that Texas sees Theresa as a threat. Texas gets the impression that Jodie and Theresa are into each other because they get on well during dance rehearsals. However, when Texas gets drunk, Jodie takes her home and she stays over. When they wake up next to each other the following morning, Texas cannot remember "if anything happened between them". Hendrickse-Spendlove explained that Texas has "got a million questions going round and round inside her head, and still isn't entirely sure where she stands with Jodie." Dodger then becomes jealous of them both.

Mac told Daniel Kilkelly of Digital Spy that the three characters are "so different and yet they're so similar" because they share the same morals of not wanting to be "tied down". Their relationships with each other initially consist of a successful "friends with benefits" type of relationship. None of the trio complains when another is sleeping around because they all want that type of freedom. Mac added that Texas and Jodie are "testing the water" and experimenting with each other. Speaking of Dodger's own preference between Texas and Jodie; the actor said that "it literally depends on the day". He likes the thought that Jodie likes both sexes, but at the same time has a long history with Texas and is still "massively attracted to her". Mac attributed Jodie's dance exam as the storyline that developed the relationship among the threesome and revealed that storyline would continue to build up. He hoped that there would be an eventual outcome for the characters, but thought that Dodger needed to remain a "lone ranger" for a while longer.

Texas later decides that she would like to make her relationship with Jodie official. Hendrickse-Spendlove told Laura Morgan of All About Soap that Texas is the type of female who had kissed another before, but never felt any attraction. She explained that Jodie is the only female her character is attracted to and Jodie turned Texas’ "world upside down"; so it is not as though Texas "suddenly decided to become a lesbian". Texas avoids Jodie following their previous kiss because she feels awkward. Texas is reminded of how much she has misses having Jodie as a friend and decides to spend time with her. Hendrickse-Spendlove said that Texas takes the plunge and the pair kiss "passionately". At which point she felt that Texas is "pretty out of her depth" as she thinks the only solution to her feelings is to have sex with Jodie. The actress was thankful because “Jodie does the right thing and tells Texas that they shouldn't rush into anything."

The storyline then returns to the ongoing theme of a love triangle; as Dodger's personal problems gain Texas' attention. She misses a date with Jodie to be Dodger's confidant for the evening. Hendrickse-Spendlove said that Texas is actually "shocked" to see Dodger opening up and he spends the night in her room without having sex. Texas tells Jodie that she still likes Dodger; and visions of grandeur ensue as she thinks that she "can change his womanising ways". She soon realises that she is mistaken and "feels sad" that she gave up a chance with Jodie, but still cannot get Dodger off her mind. The actress added that Texas' feelings for him grow stronger after seeing his sensitive side. While her feelings for him have taken over again, she wonders whether kissing Jodie was a mistake once again. It is at this point that Texas realises that she needs to decide between Jodie and Dodger.

In May 2012, Manning announced that she had left the series and thanked viewers for supporting Texas and Jodie's relationship. In August 2012, Smithwick revealed that a lesbian storyline was never planned for Texas and Jodie. Texas and Dodger were "the main story" which meant that Jodie had to depart Hollyoaks. She developed Jodie as the character who changed Texas and Dodger's lives, leaving them questioning their self-identity. The story arc culminated in Texas and Dodger realising what they like about each other through their involvement with Jodie.

=== Silas' return ===
In June 2012, it was confirmed that Silas would return to the series when paparazzi pictured Rawle back on set. Digital Spy writer Daniel Kilkelly reported that Texas would be involved in the character's return storyline. When Lynsey is strangled to death Texas fears that a copycat killer is active. The writer added that Texas would visit Silas at a psychiatric hospital to gain answers and closure. Texas makes Silas angry when she gives him India's ring in exchange for information and later steals it from him. Rawle told a writer from What's on TV that Texas was "the one that got away". He killed India by mistake and has a "nagging feeling" that he could put right his mistake by killing Texas. Silas tells the police that another murder will be committed because he has an accomplice. The police believe Silas which "delights" him because he can "play games" once again. The police know that Texas will get Silas to talk; Rawle explained that "it's hard for her as she has the awfulness of knowing that Silas killed her sister, yet she thinks that she can save a life." Silas is "delighted" to have an audience with Texas and makes a series of threats and leaves her to resolve which ones are serious. Rawle said that the reappearance of India's ring is "very symbolic" for Silas and Texas uses it to taunt him. He added that Texas is the "one he wants" and the most in danger from his return. Kilkelly later reported that Silas would escape from hospital and hold Texas captive in her flat.

=== Will Savage ===
Dodger and Texas become distant when he finds his twin sister Sienna Blake (Anna Passey). Henrickse-Spendlove told Claire Crick from All About Soap that her character presumes that Dodger no longer wants her. She witnesses Dodger with Sienna and presumes that he is having an affair. Dodger does not want his family to know about Sienna and goes along with Texas' accusations. Will Savage (James Atherton) discovers Sienna's identity, but hides the truth from Texas, using it as an opportunity to console and kiss her. Henrickse-Spendlove explained that Texas is left vulnerable and glad that Will is taking her mind off Dodger. Texas sleeps with Will and regrets it. The actress said that Texas feels sick and used when she discovers the truth. Texas' guilt prevents herself reconciling with Dodger.

Inside Soap later published a story that Will would admit to his affair with Texas and make up a lie. A spokesperson added that "his plan is reckless, and life for Texas may never be the same". A reporter from Soaplife then reported that Will would be hospitalised following a fall down the stairs. When the scenes aired Texas and Will have an argument and he throws himself down some stairs leaving him paralysed. Atherton told a reporter from Inside Soap that "he allows Texas to believe that she pushed him, which is pretty dark! It allows him to manipulate her to get what he wants." The Savage family hate her, Will guilt’s her into looking after him and he defends her. Atherton believed that Will's plan is to have Texas "completely subservient to him". Will continues to manipulate Texas at every opportunity. The actor told Daniel Kilkelly that Will puts Texas on a pedestal and she is something he has that Dodger wants. It is the first time Dodger feels inferior to Will and Texas becomes like a trophy. Will acts "all pathetic, as if he's completely reliant on her". He keeps putting ideas into Texas' head to keep her around and even instigates a kiss.

=== Departure and death ===
It was announced on 12 February 2013 that Texas would be murdered in a "whodunit" mystery. In the storyline leading to her departure Texas will agree to marry Will. But on their wedding day she will be pushed to her death from a window. Daniel Kilkelly reported that Will and Theresa will be amongst the suspects. A spokesperson stated that "there's a while to go before Texas and Will's big day arrives" and new characters could have a motive to want Texas dead. She departed in a flashback on 13 May 2013 after it was revealed her new husband Will had pushed her out of the window at the wedding venue.

== Storylines ==
India is annoyed when Texas arrives to stay with her for a couple of days. Texas annoys India by flirting with Charlotte Lau (Amy Yamazaki) and Dave Colburn (Elliot James Langridge). When she returns, Texas sleeps with India's ex-boyfriend Trent Harvard (Olivier Blanc). Trent unsuccessfully blackmails Texas and sends India a recording of their passion. India forgives Texas after they realise Trent is trying to come between them. Texas’ grandfather Alistair Longford (Terence Harvey) stops her allowance due to her overspending. She then promises Alistair that she will stop spending and donates her allowance to charity. Alistair becomes engaged to Cindy Hutchinson (Stephanie Waring) and Texas accuses Cindy of only wanting his money. Texas calls her great-grandmother Blanche (Georgina Hale) to make Alistair realise the truth. Texas starts internet dating and talks to a man named Cameron. India accuses Texas of being irresponsible, so Texas convinces India try it herself. India goes to meet Cameron instead, but it turns out to be a trap set by Silas Blissett (Jeff Rawle), who then murders India. Texas blames herself for India's death because she encouraged her to internet date.

Texas struggles to deal with India's death and gets drugs from Doug and sleeps with him, feeling regretful she takes more drugs. Texas does not attend India's funeral because she is drugged up. After being ejected from pubs and nightclubs, she wonders around in a daze. Silas finds Texas and takes her to the woods where India was murdered. Texas complies because she is too drugged up to notice anything strange. Silas prepares to murder Texas but she begins talking about India, revealing that she was Cameron's intended date. Silas realises that India did not behave how he had previously believed and feels guilty. He changes his mind and takes Texas to hospital and pretends that he saved Texas. Lynsey Nolan (Karen Hassan) is attacked and accuses Silas. Lynsey explains that the recognised Silas's voice, but Texas tells Lynsey that she is confused. But Lynsey demands that Silas is the intruder and reveals that her attacker stole her ring. Texas realises that India's ring was also stolen but still cannot believe that Silas is the culprit. Riley Costello (Rob Norbury) hears Texas' description of India's ring and realises that Silas was in possession of it. He manages to convince Riley and Texas of his innocence. However, Lynsey does not believe him and launches a campaign to expose him as India's killer. Texas soon becomes annoyed with Lynsey's obsession and tells her to stay away from her.

Texas has a causal relationship with Dodger Savage (Danny Mac). She becomes friends with Mandy Richardson (Sarah Jayne Dunn), they plan to scam Cindy out of her money. They sell her fake paintings and an exotic snake; when Cindy learns the truth she spares them police involvement. Texas attempts to make her relationship with Dodger official, but he wants things to remain casual. Texas mourns India when Lynsey exposes Silas as her murderer. Texas befriends Jodie Wilde (Montana Manning), who sleeps with Dodger, Texas pretends to be fine with the scenario. Jodie later kisses Texas who accuses her of trying to make Dodger jealous. Jodie expresses genuine interest but Texas tells her she is heterosexual. Texas becomes jealous when Jodie chooses Theresa to participate in her dance assignment. A drunken Texas nearly kisses Jodie which makes Dodger jealous. Jodie's helps Texas with her studies but she becomes jealous once again when Jodie opts to stay at Theresa McQueen's (Jorgie Porter) house. Texas goes to see Jodie and they kiss. A confused Texas begins a relationship with Jodie but soon changes her mind because of Dodger. When Lynsey is murdered, Texas assumes that Silas is responsible. She attempts to warn people that a copycat killer is active and contacts the newspaper. Silas then requests to see Texas and he tells her that Will Savage (James Atherton) is behind the murder. She is vocal about Will's guilt and this causes problems with Dodger and Will is proven innocent. Silas escapes and hold Texas hostage, but he decides to let her live because he feels that he can maintain her fear if she is alive.

Texas decides to leave for Australia but Dodger manages to convince her to stay by confessing his love. Dodger faces family issues and is upset that Texas had previously slept with Rob Edwards (David Atkins), but the relationship improves afterwards. Texas presumes Dodger is being unfaithful and he confirms her doubts. Will consoles Texas and they have sex, by later it was discover by Dodger's twin sister, Sienna Blake (Anna Passey). Texas realises that Will knew about Sienna and has used her. Dodger asks Texas to marry him but she writes him a good-bye letter and leaves. She later returns for Dodger, but Will reveals their affair. She confronts Will who throws himself down some stairs and she believes she pushed him. Will is left paralysed and a guilty Texas becomes his carer. Will guilt trips Texas into starting a relationship with him. He begins to spy on her and make Dodger jealous. He convinces Texas to marry him. Texas discovers Will and Leanne Holiday (Jessica Forrest) kissing and she sleeps with Dodger. Knowing that she plans to leave him, Will pretends to have an aneurysm to make her stay. Dodger tries to convince Texas to leave with him, but she decides to marry Will. Texas discovers the truth about Will's deception and begs Dodger to run away with her. On their wedding day, Will pushes Texas out of a window to her death when she confronts him over his lies. On 7 November 2013, Will confesses to his crimes and is arrested for the murders of Texas and his own mother, Anna Blake (Saskia Wickham).

== Reception ==
Soap opera reporting website Holy Soap stated that up until India's murder Texas had been "a good-time girl and, some might say, something of an airhead." During the grief storyline, a columnist for TV Times said that Texas had the "what the hell have I done?" look on her face from downing "bucketfulls of booze and snorting several lines of coke". They added that having sex with Doug was not a bad result, because it could have been with someone like Duncan Button (Dean Aspen). When Texas finds out Jodie slept with Dodger, a columnist for Soaplife said that they could not blame her for being jealous. When Jodie kisses Texas they said it was hard to tell who was more shocked out of Texas and Dodger. A Sunday Mercury reporter said Texas and Jodie were "the strangest pairing since Darren Osborne and Suzanne Ashworth". Soaplife's columnist later said that Dodger, Texas and Jodie were caught up in a "flirty love triangle" better known as "Dexie". They added that Texas does not "know which way to swing [...] forget swings... this is more like an emotional rollercoaster". Laura-Jayne Tyler from Inside Soap said that Texas and Dodger's relationship had been "more on and off than the plots in Hollyoaks themselves".

Anthony D. Langford from AfterElton criticised Texas' role in the Silas storyline because he was unimpressed Hendrickse-Spendlove's acting. He said that she "tries hard but she's simply not up to the task of playing against all these stronger actors in a central role in this storyline". He added that Texas is the plot's "weak link" because the actress offered the same expression and emotion "no matter what the scene". In April 2013, Kate White of Inside Soap questioned why Dodger and Will pursued Texas, because White felt Texas lacked personality, "Why on earth are Will and Dodger both so obsessed with Texas? The village fountain has more personality than her - and is only slightly less wet." In 2018, Digital Spy's Laura Morgan said that Texas had a "memorable three year stay on the show".
