= Lynsey Nolan =

Fictional character from Hollyoaks

- Hollyoaks character
- Portrayed by: Karen Hassan
- Duration: 2010–2013
- First appearance: 11 August 2010
- Last appearance: 19 July 2013
- Introduced by: Paul Marquess (2010); Bryan Kirkwood (2013)
- Spin-off appearances: Hollyoaks Later (2008, 2010)
In-universe information
- Occupation: Nurse; Cleaner
- Brothers: Eoghan Nolan

Lynsey Nolan is a fictional character from the British Channel 4 soap opera Hollyoaks, played by Karen Hassan. The character originally appeared in the first series of the Hollyoaks spin-off Hollyoaks Later. In 2010, Hollyoaks series producer Paul Marquess asked Hassan to join Hollyoaks as part of the soap's ongoing rejuvenation, to which she agreed and the character began appearing in the main show from 11 August 2010. Hassan left Hollyoaks in 2012 when her character was killed off during a "dramatic cliffhanger" episode. To surprise the audience, the actress's exit was not announced beforehand. Hassan's final scenes were broadcast on 21 August 2012, giving viewers the "ending they were looking for".

The character's main storyline during her time on the serial featured her feud with serial killer Silas Blissett (Jeff Rawle), in which she was initially targeted by the villain. Lynsey becomes "determined to find the evidence" she needs to expose Silas, entering into a game of cat-and-mouse with the murderer, who begins trying to send her mad so no one will listen to her claims. During the conclusion of the plot, Silas sets Lynsey a "sick game" to guess his next victim or that victim will die. Silas attempts to kill Lynsey again but mistakenly kills his daughter, Heidi Costello (Kim Tiddy) leading to his arrest. The character also had brief relationships with Malachy Fisher (Glen Wallace), Gilly Roach (Anthony Quinlan) and Riley Costello (Rob Norbury). Lynsey's exit plot saw the character murdered in a whodunit storyline, with the character clashing with several characters in the run up to her exit to give them motive to kill her. Lynsey's murderer was revealed to be Dr. Paul Browning (Joseph Thompson), who had killed her to prevent her revealing that Mercedes McQueen (Jennifer Metcalfe) had stabbed herself. The character has been described by Hassan who said she is the "typical girl next door" who sees the best in people. During Lynsey's feud with Silas the character was played to show a stronger and more determined side. Hollyoaks' official website has also described the character, saying she has a "delicate exterior" but the "heart and courage of a lion".

On 9 April 2013, Hassan announced that she would return to Hollyoaks as a ghost or in a vision during a storyline involving the wedding of Doctor Browning and Mercedes McQueen which also happens to be on the first anniversary of her death.

Hassan has been nominated for various awards for her portrayal of Lynsey. Lynsey was voted Hero of the Year by fans for E4 special Hollyoaks: Best Bits of 2011 and has been both praised and criticised by the British press for the suspense built up during the Silas plot, for putting herself in danger during her feud with Silas and for the shock of her exit. Following her exit Hassan received a large number of messages on social networking site Twitter and was also praised by her Hollyoaks colleagues.

== Character creation and casting ==
Lynsey was introduced as the best friend of established character, Cheryl Brady (Bronagh Waugh), during the first series of Hollyoaks Later in 2008. Karen Hassan auditioned for the role of Lynsey, along with twenty other Irish actresses. Hassan said that she felt nervous prior to the audition, as she was a big fan of Hollyoaks. The actress won the role and was contracted for five episodes. Hassan told Dawn Collinson from the Liverpool Echo that once she had completed the five episodes, she returned home to Belfast where she appeared in various television and theatre productions.

In June 2010, Kris Green from Digital Spy reported that Hassan would join Hollyoaks in August, as part of an ongoing rejuvenation of the serial. Series producer Paul Marquess believed that Lynsey and the other new characters he was introducing would bring "more fun, drama and sexiness to the show". Hassan had not expected to be asked to join Hollyoaks and said it was an exciting, but scary prospect. The actress relocated to Liverpool for filming. Her character's introduction to Hollyoaks was low-key, which made Hassan believe that she would just be kept in the background. She felt like Lynsey was "kind of plodding along" and asked the producer if he was happy with her work. He then revealed that he had been thinking along the same lines and told her that she would be a major part in an upcoming storyline featuring Silas Blissett (Jeff Rawle).

== Development ==
=== Characterisation ===
During an interview with a reporter from the show's official website, Hassan explained that Lynsey had been best friends with Cheryl for a long time. When Lynsey joined Cheryl in the village, she quickly found herself a job at the local hospital and fell in love. Hassan described Lynsey as being "a very loyal person", who wanted to see the best in people and would do anything for her family and friends. Hassan tried to make her character's personality similar to her own, so she would be believable to the viewers. Hassan felt that on occasion Lynsey needed to stand up for herself, agreeing with the reporter who called her "a bit of a push-over." She later said that Lynsey should speak her true opinions more and stop being "a soft touch". A new side to the character started to emerge when she began to grow a backbone and Hassan opined that Lynsey could "hold her own". The actress commented to an OK! journalist that Lynsey was the typical girl next door, who could stand "on her own two feet" and speak what was on her mind. Hassan also thought that she had a very long fuse, but if it reached the end then you would see the spark in her.

During the storyline with Silas, viewers were able to see a stronger and more determined side to the character. A writer for E4's official Hollyoaks website said viewers should not let the character's "delicate exterior" fool them, as beneath it she had "the heart and courage of a lion". They explained that Lynsey was required to prove she had a backbone during several crisis situations, in which she demonstrated her "superhero antics". But that her real test of character came after she was attacked by Silas. They added that the attack marked the beginning of a dangerous game of cat-and-mouse that led to Lynsey losing her friends, job, home and nearly her sanity. Various media sources described Lynsey as flirty, determined, brave, plucky, gorgeous and a beauty. After her exit, Hassan said she would like Lynsey to be remembered as a "serial killer hunter extraordinaire", the girl next door with a big heart, Cheryl's best friend and "the girl who could never really find the man of her dreams!"

=== Relationship with Gilly Roach ===
In February 2011, Lynsey became attracted to widower Gilly Roach (Anthony Quinlan) and they began a short relationship. After Gilly became a personal trainer at Look Sharpe, a local day spa, he invited Lynsey to come along for a free session. Quinlan told Inside Soap journalist, Steven Murphy, that Lynsey is "looking pretty good when she turns up" and she would eventually end up "hopping into the tub and dragging Gilly in there fully clothed!" Hassan said that she found the scene in which Lynsey pulled Gilly into the hot tub "embarrassing", despite knowing Quinlan well. She added that the scenes were not romantic to film due to the water being cold. Lynsey and Gilly later arranged a date together, which prompted Gilly to remove his wedding ring. Quinlan thought that Gilly's decision was a "bit harsh" because it was too soon for him to consider moving on from his wife, Steph (Carley Stenson). The actor stated that viewers would have to wait to see what would happen between Lynsey and Gilly, but believed that there was no comparison when it came to her and Steph.

=== Feud with Silas Blissett ===
In February 2011, Susan Hill from the Daily Star reported that Lynsey would become the next target of serial killer Silas Blissett. Hassan revealed that executive producer Paul Marquess brought her into his office to tell her that she would be involved in a "really big storyline", which he outlined to her, leaving her really excited. The storyline began when Lynsey angered Silas, who then attacked her. Silas was scared off after Lynsey's screams alerted his grandson Riley Costello (Rob Norbury) to the situation. Hassan thought Lynsey's "steeliness" helped her break free from Silas. Lynsey realised Silas was the one who attacked her, after she heard his voice which "triggers a flashback" to the moment of the attack. Hassan added that when nobody believed Lynsey, it "makes her want to bring Silas down even more. She's determined to find the evidence she needs to expose him for what he is". Waugh, who plays Lynsey's best friend Cheryl, explained that everyone believes that Lynsey is crazy and has made up the allegations. Lynsey then turns to Cheryl for help and although she hates seeing her best friend in such a state, Cheryl believed Lynsey was just being paranoid.

When Silas suffers a heart attack, Lynsey is faced with a dilemma when he is placed under her care. Hassan revealed that her character is not "thinking straight" and even though it is her job to save lives, Lynsey can not decide if she should come to the aid of the person who attempted to kill her. Lynsey is not sure if Silas is genuinely ill. In March 2011, Hassan revealed that Silas would want revenge on Lynsey after her telling people that he is behind recent murders. Hassan told a reporter from All About Soap that Lynsey innocently buys diet pills for Cheryl off the internet but Silas sees this as an opportunity to seek revenge and switches them with his heart medication, leading to Cheryl collapsing in Chez Chez. Cheryl is found by Lynsey, who is terrified for Cheryl and feels guilty. Lynsey is told that Cheryl has sedatives in her system although she is "completely flummoxed" as to how this happened as she does not consider that Silas would have wanted to hurt Cheryl. Hassan explained that Silas plans to "blacken" Lynsey's name with the scheme. Rawle revealed that Silas would work on "discrediting" Lynsey and would undermine her because she is aware of his secret. He explained that Silas would do this by breaking into her flat and moving things around in the middle of the night, adding that "it's like a war of attrition" with Silas planning to "wear her down and send her mad".

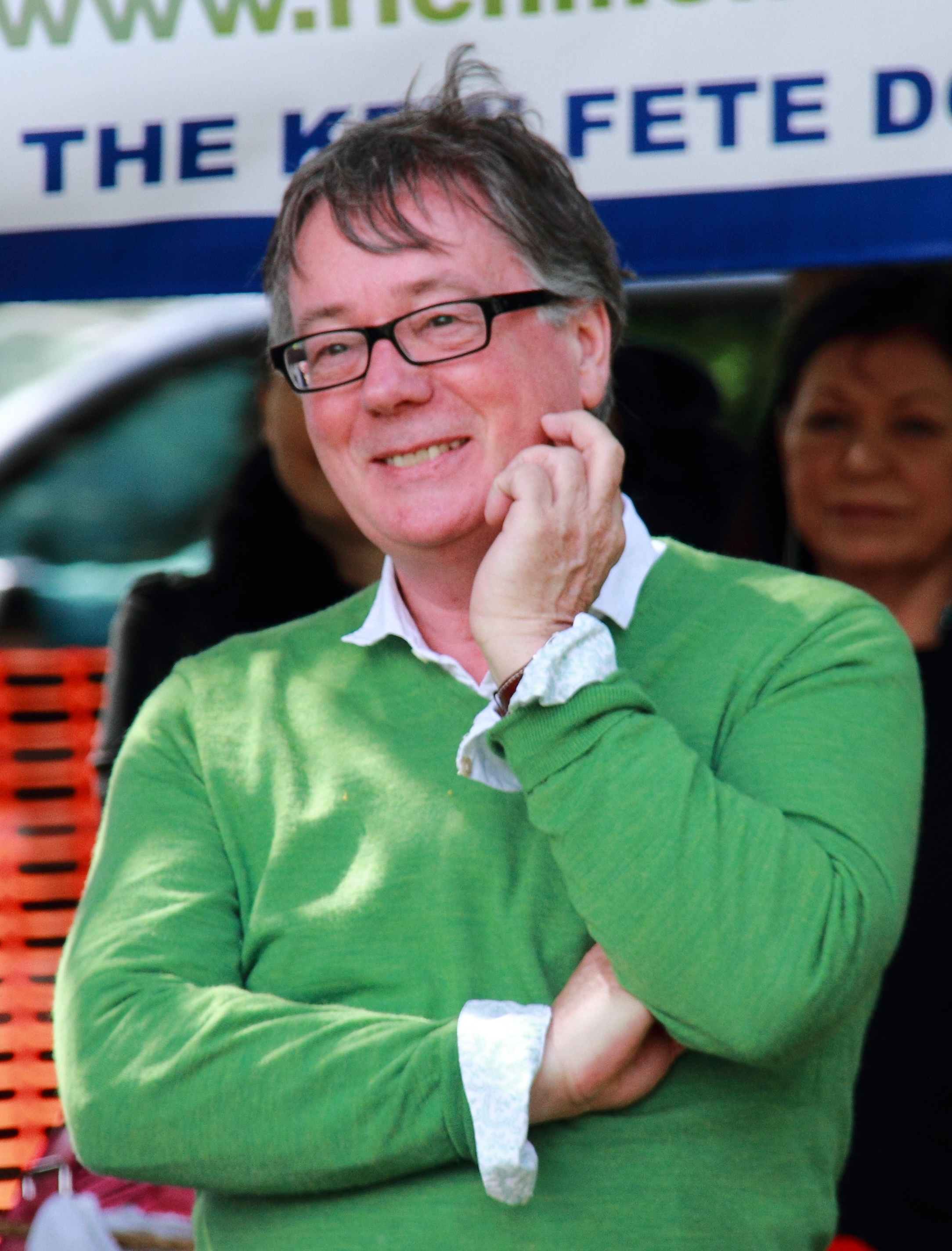
Jeff Rawle (pictured) plays Lynsey's nemesis, Silas Blissett who she enters a game of cat-and-mouse with.

Hassan explained that when Silas realises Lynsey is trying to bring him down again he "basically tells her to bring it on". She continued saying that Silas "gets off" on the idea that Lynsey is trying to prevent him from killing again as it makes his game more interesting. Texas Longford (Bianca Hendrickse-Spendlove) portrays her murdered sister, India (Beth Kingston), in a reconstruction of India's death. The actress explained that during the campaign Lynsey notices Silas is smiling and "his eyes are full of glee while Texas is clearly in turmoil" reconfirming her earlier suspicions that Silas killed India. Lynsey steals India's necklace from Texas and plants it on Silas before calling the police with an anonymous tip-off. Hassan revealed that Lynsey does this in the hope that Silas' lies will unravel, explaining that now Lynsey has "entered into this game of cat-and-mouse with Silas, she'll get deeper and deeper".

Rawle explained Silas' plan to discredit Lynsey, saying his character plans to send Lynsey mad so that no one will listen to her. He "needs to keep her in check, but Silas delights in the idea that Lynsey thinks she's good enough to play him". Silas begins messing with items in Lynsey's home, which is part of his plan to alter her reality so that "when she insists one thing is happening, it appears not to be the case the next minute". Rawle explained that this is a subtle way of sending her mad. Lynsey decides that as Silas is out to silence her she will try to catch him out and turn the tables on Silas, although Rawle teased that Silas will retaliate. He opined that although Lynsey is clever, she is not clever enough to outwit Silas and is "screaming from the rooftops about what he's done, but no one's listening".

Lynsey decides to temporarily leave the village. Hassan revealed Cheryl's brother, Brendan Brady (Emmett J. Scanlan), would become involved with the storyline and would begin to think that there is something odd about Silas, although Brendan does not think Silas is a murderer. The actress said that this leaves Lynsey to fight her own battles, teasing that the situation gets "even worse before it gets better". Lynsey discovers Texas has been speaking to a girl online. Hassan explained that when Texas is telling Lynsey about the girl she realise that the correspondent is actually Silas who is planning to hurt Texas. Lynsey arranges to meet the correspondent in the woods, planning to take journalist Nancy Hayton (Jessica Fox) with her. However, Nancy does not plan to turn up following Silas' intervention. Hassan explained that Lynsey is unaware Nancy is not coming until "the penny drops that she's all alone in the woods with Silas, she's absolutely terrified". Lynsey goes missing, with the actress explaining that nobody knows where her character is. Hassan explained that Brendan finds a note which he believes is from Lynsey telling him to meet her in the woods and because he is already suspicious of Silas he come to rescue Lynsey. Brendan arrives at the woods and discovers the body of Rae Wilson (Alice Barlow) in his car before the police arrive and arrest Brendan. Lynsey soon after returns home.

Lynsey is kicked out of the flat by Cheryl, who does not believe her claims. It was revealed Jacqui McQueen (Claire Cooper) would become an unlikely ally for Lynsey. Cooper explained that Lynsey supported Jacqui through her rape trial and believed Jacqui was telling the truth. This means Jacqui can relate to Lynsey's situation with Silas as nobody believes Lynsey's claims, leading to them building "a great friendship". Hassan also commented on the friendship, saying she was surprised to hear the pair would become friends as naturally they would not be expected to be friends. She elaborated on this, saying the characters are at opposite "ends of the spectrum" but have both been through traumatic times and have had people not believe them. They have shown each other kindness so there is "a real tenderness in their friendship".

==== Conclusion ====
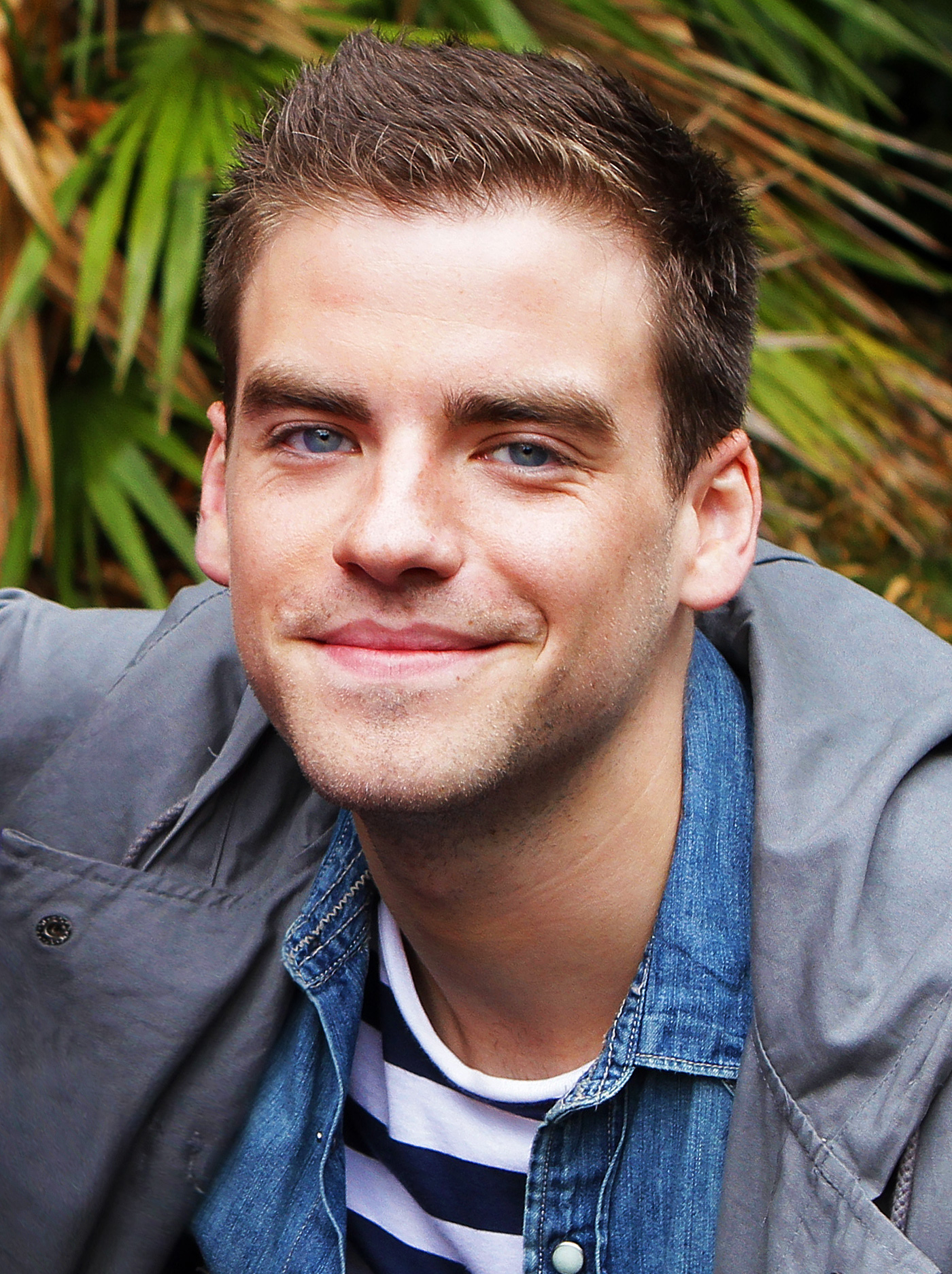
PJ Brennan (pictured) plays Doug who takes pity on Lynsey, showing her kindness and friendship during Silas' final game with Lynsey.

It was revealed Silas would take his torment of Lynsey to a new level when he makes her play a "sick game". Silas tells Lynsey she has until Halloween to guess who his next victim will be and if she succeeds he will confess to the police but if Lynsey fails Silas will kill his intended victim. Spoiler pictures released indicated that Silas had lined Lynsey up as one of four potential victims. Another promotional image featuring Silas' targets, including Lynsey, dressed as Catwoman surrounding Silas dressed as the Grim reaper was released to coincide with the plot. Rawle explained that Silas makes Lynsey guess his next victim because he "really enjoys toying with Lynsey". Rawle revealed that Silas' victim could be anyone and that he is not longer acting rationally so is now very dangerous. Hassan explained that her character realises the threat is very real and she knows that her nemesis means business this time.

Hassan explained that Lynsey does not cope with the challenge very well as she has already been pushed to breaking point over recent months and now she is trapped having to play Silas' psychotic game. Lynsey can not rest as she is thinking about the challenge, she is losing sleep and she has already lost her friends over her claims. It is a lot to have "resting on her shoulders - she knows that somebody's life is in her hands. Lynsey tries to stand up to Silas, but he outwits her at every turn". At her "lowest ebb", Lynsey confides in Doug Carter (PJ Brennan) whose girlfriend, Jenny (Daisy Turner), was killed by Silas. Hassan explained that Lynsey takes a big risk in confiding in Doug but Lynsey trusts him to keep it a secret. Lynsey feels like she should not be bringing Doug in to the dangerous situation but she realises that she needs someone to help her. Her portrayer went on to add that Doug believes Lynsey and shows her a lot of kindness and friendship. Lynsey is given clues by Silas to help her identify his next victim, although they leave Lynsey feeling like she has no way of figuring the potential victim's identity out as the clues seem to fit everyone. Hassan said that by the time Halloween arrives Lynsey feels "totally tired and exhausted". Silas reveals that Lynsey is the woman he intended to kill but she escapes. Silas kills a woman dressed as Catwoman, initially believing it to be Lynsey until he realises it is his daughter, Heidi Costello (Kim Tiddy). Lynsey soon after exposes Silas who is arrested. Hassan said that she had enjoyed seeing Lynsey show gumption during the storyline and hoped to see more of this side of her character. Reflecting on the storyline, Hassan said the storyline was amazing and added that she was enthusiastic to play the storyline. She said that previous to the storyline she had known she could show a feistier side and more depth to Lynsey which she was always aware existed.

=== Love triangle ===
Digital Spy revealed that after their suffering at the hands of Silas, Lynsey and Mercedes McQueen (Jennifer Metcalfe) would become friends after Lynsey becomes a source of support for Mercedes. Hassan said that the pair have a "kind of prickly friendship" and that they have a lot of things in common although they are very different people. She felt that it is almost like the characters should not be friends, but acknowledged that opposites attracted in this instance. Lynsey is attracted to Mercedes as she sees qualities in Mercedes that she wishes she had herself, such as Mercedes being straight-talking, ballsy and someone who "calls a spade a spade, and sometimes Lynsey wishes she had a bit of that gusto". When Mercedes begins working at the hospital as a cleaner and becomes involved with Doctor Browning (Joseph Thompson), Metcalfe explained that the pair go through everything which is a "real ride of emotions".

Mercedes begins working as an escort which Lynsey discovers. Metcalfe explained that Lynsey comes to Mercedes' rescue when she is at her lowest point and she can see how broken Mercedes is so just hugs her friend. Lynsey begins a relationship with Mercedes' ex-fiancé Riley. Metcalfe explained that if Mercedes discovered this she would feel "utterly betrayed by Lynsey". Metcalfe revealed that Lynsey and Mercedes learn that Silas will not stand trial. Mercedes feels can confide in Lynsey about the situation and has a few heart-to-hearts with Lynsey as she is the one person who fully understands the situation. Metcalfe said Lynsey proves how much she cares about Mercedes when she convinces her to see a psychiatrist. Hassan praised the plot saying it was great because of the chemistry between herself and Metcalfe. Metcalfe similarly praised the friendship saying she has loved it and has enjoyed seeing Mercedes and Lynsey form a good bond.

Norbury said that he had spoken to executive producer Gareth Philips about the connection between Riley and Lynsey when they initially shared scenes. Hassan later teased that there could be complicated times for Lynsey when she begins to flirt with Riley. She said that there is a real sexual attraction between them but due to Lynsey's friendship with Riley's ex-fiancée Mercedes she would have to support Mercedes while having a secret relationship with Riley which could become complicated. Norbury said that although Riley feels Lynsey is a lovely girl and someone he can have a laugh with, Mitzeee (Rachel Shenton) is a better match for Riley. Hassan felt that her alter-ego is happy to keep things a secret between her and Riley although when Mitzeee discovers the relationship Lynsey is on the "receiving end of a lot of jealousy". Hassan explained that although Lynsey does not want to go head-to-head with Mercedes and Mitzeee, she will not step aside either.

The actress said that Lynsey feels guilty because she is in a relationship with Riley behind Mercedes' back, but Lynsey feels that she deserves to be happy because she usually places everyone else's needs above her own. Mercedes discovers Lynsey's relationship with Riley, which Metcalfe explained comes as a shock to Mercedes who has developed a close friendship with Lynsey so does not react as expected. Hassan said that her character's love rivals, Mercedes and Mitzeee, "won't be looking after Lynsey's best interests, so she's going to have to fight for Riley's love. She's going to take care of number one - and if other people get hurt in the process, then so be it". She added that Lynsey values her friendship with Mercedes and would not want to lose it while Mitzeee is a different kind of threat. Hassan went on to say that the storyline will become "deeper and darker" and is not going to end happily, as even though Lynsey and Riley make a good couple Lynsey has never been lucky with men.

=== Departure and death ===
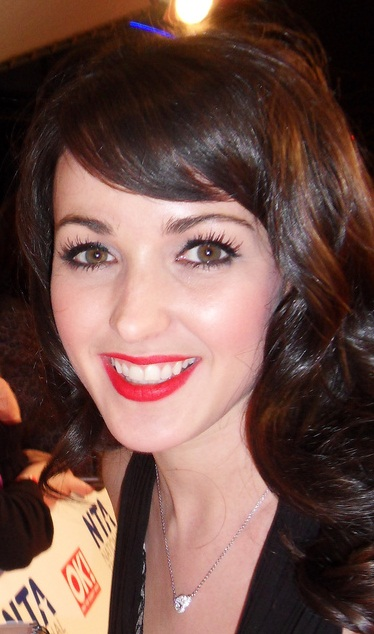
Karen Hassan (pictured) kept her exit from the serial a secret to maintain a "big shock factor" for the character's death.

In 2012, Hassan decided to leave Hollyoaks. Her departure was a mutual decision made between herself and the producers. She intended to leave in August 2012, but to facilitate the storyline she had to leave early. Hassan recalled the scenario of filming her final scenes a mere three days prior to her character's on-screen exit. Hassan's departure was not announced and the producers managed to keep Lynsey's exit a secret until transmission of E4's first look edition of the 28 June 2012 episode. This was done to ensure that viewers were taken by surprise. In the episode, Brendan was seen returning home to find Lynsey dead on the sofa.

Daniel Kilkelly from Digital Spy reported that the "dramatic cliffhanger" would start a whodunit storyline, as many characters had a motive to kill Lynsey. In the run up to her demise, Lynsey was attempting to discover a secret shared by Ally Gorman (Dan O'Connor) and Walker (Neil Newbon). She also learned that Mercedes had been stalking Mitzeee and stabbed herself to frame her rival and Will Savage (James Atherton) secret story of Silas. Meanwhile, Hollyoaks also reintroduced Silas - leaving viewers unsure if he had murdered her. After Lynsey's exit, Hollyoaks released a promotional image featuring her with the main suspects for the murder; Silas, Mercedes, Will, Sampson (Sean Cernow), Walker and Ally.

Hassan said that she was often asked if she planned to stay with the serial and although she already knew she was leaving she had to "play along with things" and keep her exit a secret to maintain the "big shock factor" she wanted. The actress had previously misled the press, telling a reporter from What's on TV that she was happy to stay at Hollyoaks for the foreseeable future. In May, when questioned by an OK! columnist whether she planned to stay with the serial, Hassan had replied that when her contract ran out in August she would have to see what happens.

Having hoped for a dramatic exit storyline, Hassan was happy with her character's demise. While saddened by the nature of such a storyline, filming intense final scenes proved enjoyable for Hassan. She also teased the audience with the revelation that Hollyoaks had not actually aired Lynsey's final on-screen appearance. She touted the scenes as "really juicy, [...] very traumatic and tumultuous" and refused to confirm whether they would be depicted as flashbacks or previous events in Lynsey's life. But she noted that viewers would have "the ending they were looking for". Hassan knew the identity of Lynsey's murderer, but remained secretive to protect the conclusion of the storyline. When viewers tuned into the episode broadcast on 17 August 2012, they were met with the identity of the perpetrator, Doctor Browning.

== Storylines ==
Lynsey is upset when she discovers that her ex-boyfriend Kris, who she still has feelings for, is bisexual and a crossdresser. However, she forgives Kris. Lynsey arrives in Hollyoaks to nurse at the Dee Valley Hospital. Lynsey comforts Malachy Fisher (Glen Wallace) after he and Mercedes argue and they kiss, before beginning a relationship. However, Malachy reunites with his wife Mercedes when she lies that she has been infected with HIV by him. Lynsey exposes Mercedes' lies via her medical records. When Malachy is injured in a fire, Lynsey says goodbye before his life support is switched off. Lynsey dates widower Gilly but Lynsey ends their relationship when he is accused of raping Jacqui.

When Lynsey gives sexual health advice via a college radio, she angers Silas who prevents her receiving a promotion. Lynsey wears a naughty nurse's outfit on webcam for the show, further angering Silas who causes a blackout in Lynsey's flat, breaks in and grabs Lynsey from behind. Silas steals her ring but when Riley hears her screams he leaves. Upon hearing Silas' voice, Lynsey accuses him of being her attacker. Riley refuses to believe Lynsey and due to lack of evidence the police do not investigate. Lynsey and Texas begin to question whether Silas is responsible for India's murder. When searching Silas' belongings for her ring, Lynsey is interrupted by Riley and returns home to discover her ring has been returned. Texas makes Riley doubt Silas' innocence and when Lynsey accuses Silas of murdering India, Riley questions Silas. Silas collapses with a heart attack and is taken to hospital where Lynsey is assigned as Silas' nurse. Assuming he is faking a heart attack, Lynsey removes his oxygen mask and questions Silas about his innocence. Silas' daughter Heidi finds Lynsey withholding treatment from Silas and calls for help leading to Lynsey being suspended. Lynsey gives Cheryl some diet pills, which Silas replaces with his heart medication. Cheryl falls, knocking herself unconscious which leads to the discovery of sedatives in her system. Silas tells Cheryl that Lynsey could have given her the sedatives, making her doubt Lynsey's state of her mind.

Silas follows Texas to the woods where he plans to murder her when Lynsey and Nancy interrupt him. Lynsey notifies Detective Constable Ethan Scott (Craig Vye) but he does not believe Lynsey's claims. Lynsey steals India's necklace from Texas before planting it on Silas. She notifies the police before Texas discovers her plan, forcing her to confess. Silas warns Lynsey that now her plan has failed she should be worried. Lynsey leaves the village temporarily. Brendan begins to believe Lynsey's claims and warns Silas. Lynsey returns to learn Texas has been corresponding with a girl online, who Lynsey realises is actually Silas. Lynsey arranges to meet the correspondent in the woods with Nancy although Silas sends Nancy to meet a journalist. Lynsey arrives in the woods alone, unaware Nancy is not coming. When Lynsey goes missing, Brendan goes to the woods in search of her. Brendan is arrested after the discovery of Rae's body in his car and Lynsey returns to learn of this. Cheryl evicts Lynsey and she moves in with Jacqui. Lynsey hits Silas over the head with a rock and believing him to be dead tells Ethan although when they arrive Silas is gone and later denies all knowledge of the attack.

Silas sets Lynsey the challenge of guessing his next victim before Halloween although if she fails he will kill the intended victim. Lynsey attacks Silas following his taunts and is arrested for GBH and although she is issued a warning, she is released. Lynsey convinces Doug of Silas' plan and together they narrow down the possible victims. Silas sends Lynsey a Catwoman costume to wear to the Chez Chez Halloween party. Lynsey is thrown out of the party after trying to convince the guests that a murder is going to take place. When Lynsey returns home, Silas confronts her, confessing that she is his intended victim and that if he were to kill Lynsey he would confess to the police. Lynsey agrees to die but smashes a vase over Silas' head and runs out the flat. Silas kills a woman in a Catwoman costume, believing her to be Lynsey, although he discovers he has killed Heidi. Lynsey and Riley discover Silas' victim's rings and Mercedes' engagement ring, leading to Silas being arrested. Silas refuses to reveal Mercedes' location, saying that he wants Lynsey as she is an opponent he has a rapport. Silas and Lynsey exchange taunts which angers Silas in to revealing Mercedes location. Mercedes gives birth and Lynsey visits Silas for a final time, telling him that he is just a sad old man that no longer has any hold over her and that she can finally sleep soundly. She leaves, relieved her ordeal is over. Lynsey gains her friends back and she and Cheryl become friends again.

Lynsey damages her friendship with Mercedes when she begins a relationship with Riley, which ends because of his feelings for Mitzeee. The latter accuses Lynsey of being a stalker which results in Mercedes being stabbed during a confrontation with Mitzeee. She realises that Mercedes stabbed herself and stalked Mitzeee because of her involvement with Riley. Lynsey is also threatened by Walker and Ally after she becomes suspicious about their shared past. Brendan finds her dead and a murder investigation is launched with Mercedes, Ally and Walker amongst the suspects. Jacqui exposes Doctor Browning as the perpetrator - during flashbacks he kills Lynsey because she discovered Mercedes' vendetta against Mitzeee. Walker is present at the murder and does not prevent it in order to conceal an undercover police operation that she discovers. Lynsey appears as an apparition in Silas' mind and following her funeral, Doctor Browning pleading not guilty to charges of murder. At Christmas, Doctor Browning turns up at Mercedes' door and explains that he was cleared of murdering Lynsey after blaming Riley Costello (Rob Norbury).

A year later in September 2013, Riley's name is cleared when Doctor Browning confesses to Lynsey's murder after being arrested for shooting Myra McQueen. Myra actually faked her death with a bullet proof vest and flees the country so Doctor Browning would be sent down and therefore kept away from Mercedes. In 2016, Silas tells Lindsey Roscoe (Sophie Austin) that he loves her name as he knew a Lynsey before.

== Reception ==
Both Hassan and her character earned several award nominations. In a poll run by E4 to find the Best Bits of 2011, Lynsey was voted Hero of the Year. In Digital Spy's end of year reader's poll for 2011, the Silas plot, including his feud with Lynsey, won Best Soap Storyline. Kilkelly of Digital Spy also chose Lynsey and Silas' Halloween showdown as one of his favourite moments of Hollyoaks in 2011. At the 2012 British Soap Awards, Hassan received a nomination for Best Actress. She was also nominated for Best Actress at the Inside Soap Awards. In the same year, the Halloween episode in which Lynsey's game with Silas concluded won Best Episode at the All About Soap Awards.

Sarah Ellis, writing for Inside Soap, described Lynsey as "Hollyoaks's very own Miss Marple". A reporter from the Sunday Mercury commented that Lynsey should have left Silas alone, saying "Surely she realises that exposing a killer is a lethal business?" Another reporter from the same paper noted that Lynsey "foolishly" met Silas in the woods despite knowing he was a murderer. A Western Mail stated "Lynsey's not going to stop until she's put herself in an early grave. Determined to expose Silas as a murderer, she's like a dog with a bone, intent on making sure he gets his comeuppance". Another Sundary Mercury writer said that Lynsey was "very foolish to take part" in Silas' challenge to guess who his next victim would be. The Liverpool Echo's Dawn Collinson thought that the plot was full of suspense, "nail-biting hour after hour of it", before adding that it was gripping. Anthony D. Langford from AfterElton commented that Hassan's performance as Lynsey throughout the storyline was "effective" although he believed that her character had become a "little too whiny at times". An OK! columnist said that Lynsey and Mercedes are "the unlikeliest couple of 'bessie mates'" in the serial, but felt the pair proved themselves to be "Merseyside's version of Thelma and Louise!"

Lynsey's death shocked Laura Morgan from All About Soap, who could not believe that she was writing about her death. She felt that it was so unexpected she would never have foreseen the scenario "in a million years". Sarah Ellis from rival magazine Inside Soap shared Morgan's sentiments, branding it "the mother of all shocks". Ellis said that she did not see it coming and concluded that she would miss Lynsey, who was on the path of becoming one of her "favourite Hollyoaks characters". Heat columnist Sophie Wilkinson felt that the episode dealing with the aftermath of Lynsey's death was a "shocker" and questioned "Who could kill butter-wouldn't-melt nurse Lynsey?" Langford also expressed shock at her exit, saying that soaps rarely ever surprise him due to there predictability. He wrote that he did not "see Lynsey's death coming because it was so sudden. One moment she was there and the next she was gone. It was swift and out of nowhere, yet her death not only made perfect sense, it has galvanized this show in a way that has been missing for so long. Because of Lynsey's death, various disparate storylines and plots are finally coming together under one intriguing umbrella arc".

Hassan told Digital Spy's Kilkelly that she had received a high volume of messages via social networking site Twitter in response to her exit. She added that viewers named Lynsey as one of their favourite characters amongst "some really nice feedback". Hassan's colleagues also paid tribute to her after her exit. Rawle (Silas) called Hassan "brilliant" during their "very strong" scenes, while Waugh (Cheryl) stated that the "phenomenal" Hassan could "make the audience laugh and cry in equal measure". Fox (Nancy) said that Lynsey had been at the core of the serial's "best storylines". Metcalfe (Mercedes) called her an "absolute [professional]", while Cooper (Jacqui) commented that she was a "generous" actress to work with. Kilkelly also called Lynsey a "super sleuth".
