= Paul Opacic =

English actor (b. 1966)

- Born: Paul Opacic; 1965 or 1966 (age 60–61); Halifax, England
- Occupation: Actor
- Years active: 1991–present
- Notable work: Emmerdale (1996–1999, 2026-present); Bad Girls (2001–2002); The Chase (2006–2007); Hollyoaks (2010–2013, 2018); Only Fools and Horses (1991)

Paul Opacic (born 1966) is a British actor from Halifax, England. Best known for his roles as Carl Costello in Hollyoaks, Steve Marchant in Emmerdale and Mark Waddle in Bad Girls. In 2021, he joined the cast of the ITV soap opera Coronation Street as Stefan Brent.

== Career ==
After appearing in several minor television credits in the early 1990s, including comedies Only Fools and Horses and Birds of a Feather, it was in 1996 that Opacic got his big break when he was cast in Emmerdale as Steve Marchant, a new love interest for Kim Tate. Opacic enjoyed several high-profile storylines in his time on the show, before his character was axed by producer Kieran Roberts in 1999. Opacic's stint in Emmerdale led to later appearances in Heartbeat, Doctors and Peak Practice before he joined ITV prison drama Bad Girls in 2001 at the beginning of its third series playing officer Mark Waddle. Opacic left the series the following year and last appeared at the end of the fourth series. In the ensuing years he appeared in several minor roles in programmes such as Cold Feet, The Bill and Totally Frank. In 2006, he joined the cast of the new BBC drama The Chase in a supporting role and remained with the show until it was cancelled in 2007. Further television credits include The Royal, Holby City and most recently Waterloo Road, in which he portrayed the neglectful father of one of the school pupils Finn Sharkey.

In early 2010, it was stated that Lucy Allan had quit the position of executive producer of Hollyoaks and that Paul Marquess had taken over the role. It was soon announced that Marquess planned to give the soap a "shake up". He cast Opacic in a new central family in the soap opera, stating he would play the role of Carl Costello. He stayed in the soap until 2013, and made a two-episode guest stint in 2018. In 2021, he was cast in the ITV soap opera Coronation Street as villain Stefan Brent.

== Filmography ==
Year	Title	Role	Notes
1991	Only Fools and Horses	Jules	Episode: "The Chance of a Lunchtime"
1991	4 Play	Biker	1 episode
1991	Birds of a Feather	Hairdresser	1 episode
1992	Lovejoy	Andrew	1 episode
1992	Screen Two	Jeff	1 episode
1992	Sam Saturday	DC Knights	4 episodes
1992	The Young Indiana Jones Chronicles	French Officer	
1992	Screen One	Policeman 1	
1993	Love Hurts	Musician	1 episode
1993	All in the Game	Weeks	6 episodes
1993	Mr. Bean	Rob	1 episode
1994	Men of the World	Young Man from Top Clothes	1 episode
1996–1999, 2026-present	Emmerdale	Steve Marchant	Series regular; 256 episodes
1996	Element of Doubt	Traffic Policeman	
1996	A Secret Slave	Kumari's Solicitor	
1999	Triple Exposure		
2000, 2008	Doctors	Rick; Simon Amley	2 episodes
2000	Heartbeat	Graham Rysinski	3 episodes
2001	Peak Practice	Mark Kershaw	3 episodes
2001–2002	Bad Girls	Mark Waddle	Series regular; 19 episodes
2003, 2008	Holby City	Carl Jeffries; Kevin Mathers	2 episodes
2003	Cold Feet	Howard Trigg	1 episode
2003	The Bill	Nikitsa Severic	3 episodes
2004	In Denial of Murder	Detective	
2004	Murder in Suburbia	Matt	
2004	A Thing Called Love	Rich Allen	1 episode
2005	Vincent	Andrew McCormack	1 episode
2005–2006	Totally Frank	Thom	5 episodes
2006–2007	The Chase	Adrian Huby	Series regular; 16 episodes
2007	The Royal	Gideon Bradley	1 episode
2008	Sofia's Diary	Simon Taylor	1 episode
2009	Salvage	Corporal Simms	
2010	Waterloo Road	Ryan Sharkey	2 episodes
2010–2013, 2018	Hollyoaks	Carl Costello	Series regular; 134 episodes
2010	Hollyoaks Later	Carl Costello	2 episodes
2017	The Moorside	Detective Superintendent Paul Brennan	2 episodes
2021, 2024	Coronation Street	Stefan Brent	14 episodes
