= Theresa McQueen =

Fictional character from Hollyoaks

- Hollyoaks character
- Portrayed by: Jorgie Porter
- Duration: 2008–2016, 2020–2022, 2024–present
- First appearance: 24 November 2008
- Introduced by: Bryan Kirkwood (2008, 2014, 2020); Hannah Cheers and Angelo Abela (2024)
- Spin-off appearances: Hollyoaks Later (2009–2013, 2025); Hollyoaks: King of Hearts (2010)
In-universe information
- Occupation: Student; Waitress; Spa assistant; Gym assistant; Cleaner; Florist assistant; Secretary; Barmaid
- Family: McQueen
- Father: Billy Alexander
- Mother: Kathleen McQueen
- Half-sisters: Jacqui McQueen; Mercedes McQueen; Emily Alexander
- Daughters: Kathleen-Angel McQueen; Myra-Pocahontas Savage-McQueen
- Grandmothers: Marlena McQueen
- Aunts: Reenie McQueen; Myra McQueen
- Nephews: Bobby Costello; Gabriel McQueen
- Nieces: Phoebe McQueen (adoptive)
- First cousins: Niall Rafferty; Jacqui McQueen; Mercedes McQueen; Tina Reilly; Carmel McQueen; John Paul McQueen; Michaela McQueen; Porsche McQueen; Celine McQueen; Cleo McQueen
- Other relatives: Goldie McQueen; Prince McQueen; Hunter McQueen; Sylver McQueen (adoptive); Cher Winters (adoptive); Bart McQueen; Max McQueen; Matthew McQueen

Theresa McQueen is a fictional character from the British Channel 4 soap opera Hollyoaks, played by Jorgie Porter. She made her first appearance on 24 November 2008. The character was introduced as an extension of already established McQueen family and quickly became a fan favourite for her cute, bubbly personality and dark storylines. During her first five years on the show, Porter was featured in numerous high-profile storylines, including: underage sex; the murder of Calvin Valentine (Ricky Whittle); teenage pregnancy; being the target of serial killer Silas Blissett (Jeff Rawle); falling down a lift shaft; discovering her boyfriend, Ethan Scott (Craig Vye) was dating two other women and forming a friendship with the girls; finding her long-lost father; relationships with Dodger Savage (Danny Mac), Will Savage (James Atherton) and Joel Dexter (Andrew Still); and her arrest for Calvin's murder. Porter announced her departure from the soap in October 2013 so she could focus on Dancing on Ice. Her exit scenes aired on 9 January 2014.

It was announced in April 2014, four months after her exit scenes aired, that Porter would be returning to the serial as Theresa, with her return scenes airing on 25 August 2014. Theresa's storylines since her return have included: a breakout from prison; giving birth to her second child, this time with Dodger and her subsequent on-off relationship with him; a feud with Sonny Valentine (Aaron Fontaine); being involved in a train crash which saw Calvin's wife and her cousin, Carmel (Gemma Merna) save Theresa and die; being kidnapped by Will; agreeing to donate a kidney to Nico Blake (Persephone Swales-Dawson); a relationship with Patrick Blake (Jeremy Sheffield) which saw her care for him as he suffered from motor neurone disease; and being targeted by Nico as she plotted to kill her for her other kidney. In 2016, Porter left the soap again in order to pursue a career in Hollywood. She agreed to reprise the role in 2020 for the programme's 25th anniversary on a short-term basis, however it was later announced that the character would not depart at the end of year as originally planned and Porter would remain in the soap indefinitely. On 8 December 2022, Theresa left the village to accommodate Porter's maternity leave, before returning on 16 January 2024. Porter took another maternity leave in 2024, with Theresa leaving the village on 30 December 2024.

== Casting ==
The character was announced in early November 2008. 20-year-old actress Jorgie Porter was cast as Myra McQueen's (Nicole Barber-Lane) 15-year-old niece, Theresa. She was described as a "teen temptress" and "lolita type". Porter, speaking of her new role, said: "I'm thrilled to be joining not just Hollyoaks but one of soap's most notorious families. Although she's feisty with outsiders, Theresa's ranking within the family is low so she's eager to impress. I can’t wait to see how Theresa earns her stripes as part of the McQueen clan!" Due to the departures of Tina McQueen (Leah Hackett) and John Paul McQueen (James Sutton) earlier in 2008, Hollyoaks producer Bryan Kirkwood added a new member to the McQueen family. Theresa was mentioned earlier before her entrance to the soap on-screen during a conversation between Myra and Nana McQueen (Diane Langton), her mother Kathleen McQueen (Alison Burrows) was also mentioned when it was revealed she was in prison.

== Development ==
=== Characterisation ===
The character of Theresa was first described as "A 'teen temptress' and 'Lolita type' who has a distinct lack of self-awareness. Her vulnerability is her status within her family and she is alert to the fact that she has a long way to go before she becomes a real member of the McQueens." Also her keen love of men was noted. In 2010, Porter commented on the character, saying: "She's got load of attitude, but she's got a good heart, too. Although she'd probably flirt with your boyfriend. She wouldn't mean to hurt you, but she'd think, 'Your boyfriend fancies me. Watcha gonna do?'" Following the revelation that Theresa shot Calvin Valentine (Ricky Whittle), Porter commented about what it would show from Theresa's character, saying: "I was a bit excited, too, because it's another side Theresa can show."

=== Calvin Valentine's murder and pregnancy ===
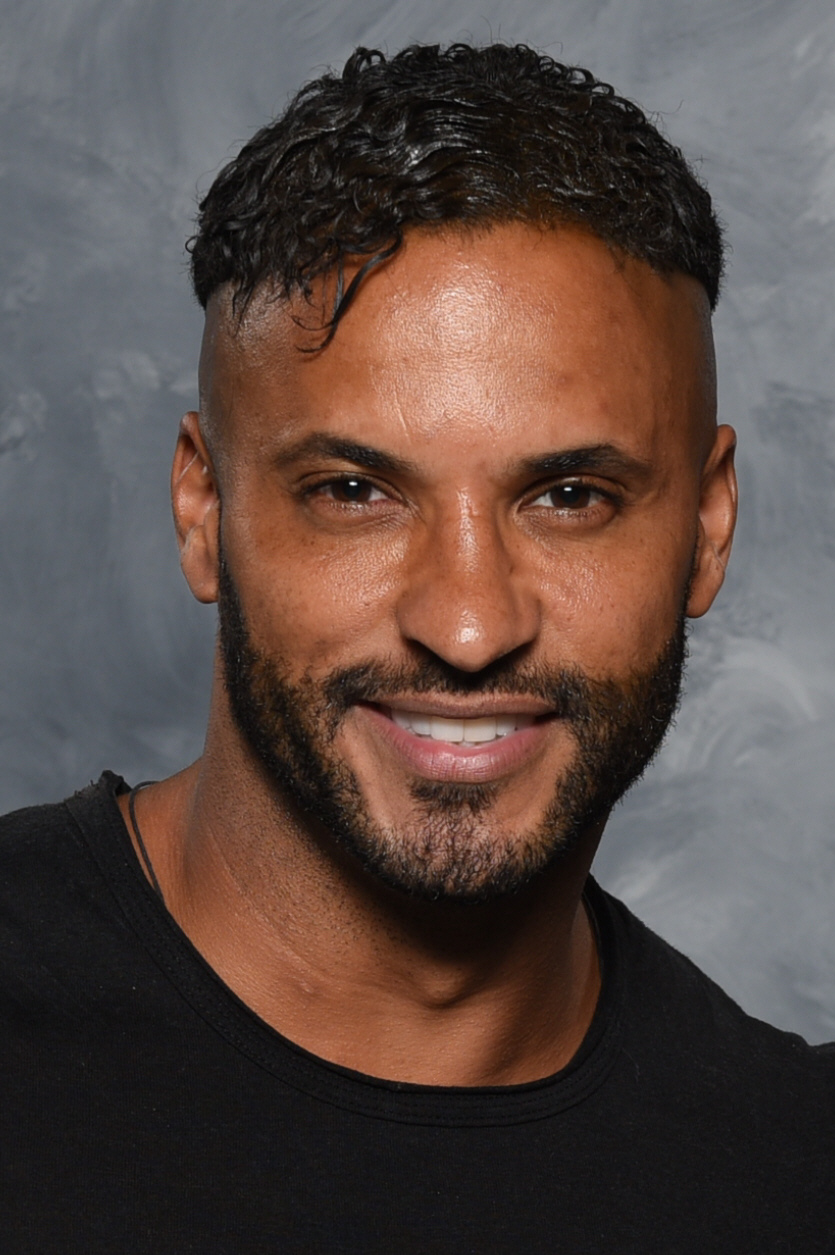
Ricky Whittle plays Calvin Valentine, the character that Theresa kills.

In December 2009, Hollyoaks broadcast the first ever flashforward episode. The episode, set in May 2010, featured the wedding of Calvin and Carmel Valentine (Gemma Merna), as well as the murder of Calvin. This started a six-month-long 'whodunnit'. During May 2010, Theresa was revealed as the killer. When asked what her reaction to the news that she was the murderer, Porter said: "I was a bit gutted because I thought I'd be gone, because everyone gets puts away for life if they kill someone. I believe one day she should get her comeuppance and I think she does." In an interview with Digital Spy, Porter was asked what happened in the aftermath, saying: "It's the whole guilt trip really. It was never planned because Theresa's not that type of person. She's not a murderer — she's a 17-year-old girl with little girl tendencies. She wants to talk about boys and clothes and make-up, then this comes along and totally changes her." She also explained Theresa's motive: "Well, she'd recently had a night of naughtiness with Calvin, and as a result she fell pregnant. She was really stressed out about it and he's getting married so she thinks, 'If I go and tell him maybe he won't get married to her and maybe he'll want to bring up the baby with [me]'. I think she thought he would be with her." Porter admitted that she thinks it allows viewers to see a "completely different side to her character," but also believes Theresa is probably "a little too young." She also admitted her view on Theresa's personality after Calvin's murder: "You see her become really vulnerable. You saw her vulnerable when her mum left but this is a total helplessness, she just doesn't know what to do."

Whittle, who portrayed Calvin, told Inside Soap that he was "very surprised" when he learnt the identity of the killer. He later admitted he wanted a different killer. He stated: "My opinion was it would have been someone else. If I was going to pick a killer for Calvin I don't think anyone had a strong enough motive apart from Mercedes (Jennifer Metcalfe), Malachy and Spencer. Obviously, with Malachy, I was sleeping with his wife. Mercedes is a woman scorned, and I don't think Spencer understands consequences so he could probably act without realising that if he shot Calvin he would die and that would be forever. I thought it could possibly been him because he was upset that Calvin left Warren to die, so those are the only three I felt had enough motive to pull the trigger."

Along with Calvin's murder, Theresa's next main storyline was her pregnancy. Porter commented on having to wear the fake bump, saying: "It's so hot! I have to wear a big padded bra as well as the bump and I can get quite irritable." She also expressed her concern about acting with a child: "I'm not looking forward to acting with a baby, either. Some kids can be quite laid-back, but I've worked with ones who've just screamed in my face the whole time. Nightmare!" After Theresa gave birth to Angel McQueen in Hollyoaks Later, Merna, who plays Carmel, explained Carmel's plan to take baby Angel and raise her as her own: "In Carmel's mind, the baby is hers. It's Calvin's baby, therefore it is her baby because they were supposed to be the ones who were going to have a child together. She's really angry and wants to make Theresa pay for ruining her life. But she also dearly wants to bring the baby up. She believes she can give Angel a better life than Theresa, who's young and still wants to go out and have fun."

=== 2014 departure and return ===
On 13 October 2013, it was announced that Porter had chosen to leave her role as Theresa after five years and would be filming her final scenes in late 2013. It was revealed, two months later, that Porter would be leaving to compete in the final series of Dancing On Ice, having previously appeared in the show in 2012. Theresa's exit storyline would see her face consequences for Calvin's murder that occurred four years previously, to which the show's executive producer, Bryan Kirkwood said: "Theresa has got away with murder for many years, so it is time for her to face the consequences." Entertainment website, Digital Spy reported that Porter was expected to return after a break, with the door left open. Speaking of her decision to leave, Porter said: "I've loved playing Theresa and of course being a McQueen. I've been so lucky to have been given some amazing storylines over the last five years. I start to feel a little emotional when I think about leaving but the time is right for me to move on. I've still got a while to go yet so there'll be plenty more mischief from Theresa over the next few months." Meanwhile, Kirkwood described Porter as " a real talent, beautiful, sexy and a delightful presence on and off screen." Porter had since stated she had backed her exit, while co-star, Gemma Merna (Carmel Valentine) expressed her sadness over Porter's decision to leave as well as stating she hoped that Porter would return soon.

Porter filmed her exit scenes on 17 December 2013 and was pictured in an emotional farewell party, surrounded by her colleagues. In January 2014, speaking in an interview with Daniel Kilkelly of Digital Spy, Porter revealed that the main reason behind her exit was appearing in Dancing on Ice and being unable to cope with both programmes and the tour when she appeared in 2012. She also mentioned that she was excited upon hearing that Sonny Valentine would be returning to the cast, now played by Aaron Fontaine, but quickly realised that Sonny would behind her exit. Porter also spoke about how she would miss her on-screen family, the show and her family. Theresa's exit scenes aired on 9 January 2014 as she was arrested for the murder of Calvin, following the return of Sonny. Porter appeared on Dancing on Ice, but was eliminated in the first week.

On 24 April 2014 - four months after her exit scenes aired - it was announced that Porter would be returning to Hollyoaks and that her return scenes would be air during the year. Theresa's return storyline would feature "more twists and turns" in the build-up to her trial. Of her return, Porter said: "I am excited to be returning. Theresa is awaiting trial but has some serious unfinished business before then so I am thrilled to be able to come back and finish what we started." Meanwhile, the show added: "Theresa is on a mission and she's got a secret that's going to shock a lot of people around the village." Fontaine also spoke about Theresa's return, stating that Sonny still wants justice for his brother's murder and is looking forward to the drama between Sonny and Theresa. He also stated that he expects to be involved in Porter's return, "It'd be weird if Sonny wasn't involved in it, because obviously he still wants justice for his brother. If Theresa is released from prison so quickly, he'll feel that justice hasn't been served." Porter later expanded on her return and expressed that she would like Theresa to be nice upon her return to the village. Porter revealed that she would be filming within the summer and that she is unaware of her return storyline as well as that she would like to stay with soap for "a while". It was also announced in July 2014 that Nicole Barber-Lane would be returning to her role as Myra McQueen to tie in with Theresa's return. Porter's return scenes were previewed in the annual Hollyoaks: Six Weeks of Summer trailer that showed what would happen in the space of six weeks between 21 July and 29 August.

In July 2014, Kirkwood later promised that Theresa's return would "cause havoc" upon the McQueen family as well as revealing that Porter had begun filming with the soap. Kirkwood described Theresa upon her return as "renewed and reinvigorated". Porter also promised show fans that Theresa would have a secret upon her return, but was unable to reveal the secret because she does not want to spoil the surprise. She also stated: "When you see Theresa again, she is definitely desperate to get her baby back. She's had a lot of time to think in prison as there isn't much to do, so she's grown a bit desperate." It was later revealed that Theresa's return scenes would air on 25 August and see her request to see Carmel and Kathleen-Angel. Unfortunately for Theresa, Sonny arrives at the prison after telling Carmel that Theresa cancelled the visit, before warning Theresa to back off. To coincide with Theresa's return, Alison Burrows also returned in a guest stint as Kathleen McQueen. Upon her return, Theresa gave birth to a second daughter Myra-Pocahontas which was her surprise secret. It was shortly discovered that old flame, Dodger Savage (Danny Mac) was the father of the baby.

=== 2016 departure and 2020 return ===
On 18 July 2015, it was announced that Porter would be leaving for the second time, having only returned in August 2014, with her final scenes airing in early 2016. Show bosses have chosen to keep Theresa's departure storyline unrevealed for now, but have promised more drama for Theresa between summer 2015 and 2016. Reports have suggested that Porter is hoping to pursue a career in Hollywood after finishing filming, having visited America on a recent holiday and already planning a career. It was also suggested that this exit is being treated as a break, with Porter promised not to be killed off so that she could return in the future. A spokesperson for the show commented: "Theresa McQueen is currently embroiled in exciting storylines well into next year. Theresa and her aunt Myra do come and go from Hollyoaks village but we do not comment on individual artistes' contracts."

In March 2020, it was announced Porter agreed to reprise the role for the show's twenty-fifth anniversary.

== Storylines ==
Theresa is first mentioned by Myra McQueen (Nicole Barber-Lane) and Nana McQueen one month before her introduction. During her arrival, Theresa is attracted to Tony Hutchinson (Nick Pickard) while in The Loft, whom she meets during an educational-themed night. Sexual tension mounts between the pair and ultimately spend the night together, with Tony unaware that she is only fifteen. Theresa falls in love with Tony, who realises her deception, and destroys any chances of a future with him. A dejected Theresa turns to her family, the McQueens. Jacqui McQueen (Claire Cooper), who is still infuriated with Tony for his fling with her sister Mercedes McQueen (Jennifer Metcalfe), is angered with Tony for his night with Theresa. She immediately calls the police, who charge him. Theresa then moves in with the McQueens, sharing a room with cousin Michaela McQueen (Hollie-Jay Bowes), whom she previously had turned to for advice. Jacqui is not pleased at Theresa moving in but soon warms. Theresa then tells the police she was deceptive about spending the night with Tony, who is released. Theresa finds an unlikely friendship in Anita Roy (Saira Choudhry) and auditions for the part of The Virgin Mary in a nativity play produced by older cousin Carmel Valentine (Gemma Merna) and Cindy Cunningham (Stephanie Waring). However, she is heckled off the stage by some teenagers, who clearly know she is not a virgin. On Christmas Day, Anita finds a DVD containing CCTV footage of Warren Fox (Jamie Lomas) sleeping with Mandy Richardson (Sarah Jayne Dunn) and gives it to the McQueens, who set off to ruin Warren's wedding to Louise Summers (Roxanne McKee). Theresa begins battling against Lauren Valentine (Dominique Jackson) for friendship with Anita. When Lauren makes a comment about the McQueens, Theresa reminds her that Carmel is married to Lauren's brother Calvin. Theresa follows her family by using a fake pregnancy bump to shoplift. Having a proper relationship with Ste Hay (Kieron Richardson), Theresa is dumped by him, who wants to focus on son Lucas Hay (Jude).

After the McQueens home becomes infested with rats, Theresa and Carmel move in with Anita and her family. Anita begins to feel she is ugly and becomes increasingly ashamed of her skin colour after racial abuse from Gaz Bennett (Joel Goonan). She starts using Theresa's picture to speak to a boy named Ricky Campbell (Ashley Margolis) on the internet. Theresa finds out about Anita using her picture and is angry. Anita uses Theresa's jacket and smashes a window in the school. Anita's father Govinda Roy (Anthony Bunsee) tells Myra, Carmel and Theresa to leave, believing it was Theresa. After Anita admits the truth, her mother Bel Roy (Nila Aalia) begs Myra, Carmel and Theresa to stay, and tells them that Anita had poured bleach over her legs to change her ethnicity. Theresa feels guilty for not helping Anita and she apologises before reassuring her that she does not need to change her appearance. After a game of 'truth or dare', Theresa has to kiss Newt (Nico Mirallegro). They eventually get together, which is revealed by Anita's partner Ricky, causing Lauren to be extremely jealous. Theresa follows her wish and becomes a model for a project by Zoe Carpenter (Zoë Lister), for "Buff TV" while Newt breaks up with her, not a fan of her future career. Theresa is then disgusted when he starts dating Anita, so she slaps her and stops speaking to both of them. Carmel is also shocked with the modelling, and cannot believe that Zoe is using a sixteen-year-old. Due to this, Theresa is spotted and discovered by a modelling agency in London. Theresa makes her way with Michaela, and are followed by Jacqui and Carmel. When she gets there, she decides to visit her mother Kathleen in prison. Kathleen tells Theresa to move back in with her grandmother, showing hostility towards the other McQueens. Kathleen then leaves an upset Theresa. Back in Hollyoaks, Theresa refuses to speak to Anita, however supports her when she develops an eating disorder.

Theresa is happy to hear that Kathleen is visiting for Christmas, after being released from prison. The rest of the McQueens are skeptical, which proves correct when Kathleen does not arrive. Several days later, Kathleen arrives in Hollyoaks and asks Myra for money, which Theresa's father left for her. Myra refuses and tells her to leave before Theresa finds her. Later, Theresa meets Kathleen just as she is leaving the village. Kathleen, not wanting to disappoint her daughter, claims she has come to stay. Kathleen gives Theresa expensive gifts like a gold charm bracelet. Theresa accepts it, desperate to believe her mother has changed. Kathleen then encourages Theresa to shoplift, which causes more tension between Kathleen and the rest of the McQueens. Kathleen also tells Theresa that they should run away together to London, to which Theresa agrees and says goodbye to Anita, while the rest of the McQueens are out. However, when saying goodbye, Theresa finds her mother's purse which contains a credit card in the name of her dead cousin Tina and is horrified. Myra and Jacqui find out Kathleen and Theresa's plan to run away and tries to stop Theresa from going, to which she agrees. Kathleen then leaves, which leads to Theresa holding a grudge against Jacqui.

Carmel's fiancé, Calvin Valentine (Ricky Whittle), and Theresa spend time together in the Loft. The atmosphere heats up and they end up sleeping together. Later, Theresa gets pregnant with Calvin's child. Theresa begins a romance with Kyle Ryder (Neil Toon) after she fixes his car. At Calvin and Carmel's second wedding, Theresa admits to Calvin that she is pregnant. Calvin tells her he wants her to have an abortion, which shocks Theresa. He then lies to Carmel about the paternity after she finds out about Theresa's pregnancy. Feeling emotional and rejected, Theresa sees a gun in Jacqui's bag at the wedding reception and snatches it. She shoots Calvin and he dies in Carmel's arms. Mercedes and Jacqui quickly flee the scene with Theresa to protect her. Jacqui is then told that Calvin's passionate rendezvous with Theresa has caused her to fall pregnant. Jacqui stands by Theresa and hides the gun, before lying to police when they are questioned. Theresa decides to run away with Kyle, still in shock at killing Calvin. However, Kyle treats his pregnant girlfriend curtly, and introduces her to his new girlfriend, Stacey. Theresa returns home to the McQueen's. Jacqui tries to force Theresa into terminating the pregnancy, but Carmel convinces her to keep the baby. Jacqui plants the gun used to kill Calvin on racist Gaz, who is caught holding Anita hostage and arrested for killing Calvin. Theresa is unwilling to let Gaz go to prison for Calvin's murder, however is convinced to stay quiet. Myra discovers Theresa is pregnant and eventually uncovers the truth about Calvin's death. Following this, Kyle is arrested for armed robbery and charged with Calvin's murder, as it was his gun that was used to shoot him. Carmel later discovers the baby is Calvin's and that Theresa killed him. Angry, she agrees to let Theresa have the baby, but insists she will go to the police after the birth.

Still trying to pursue a modelling career, Theresa performs a catwalk for Heidi Costello's (Kim Tiddy) fashion show, where she develops a crush to Riley Costello (Rob Norbury). Later, Theresa talks to Heidi's cousin Mitzeee (Rachel Shenton), who on purpose does not switch her headset off. Mitzeee then reveals to Theresa, and everyone at the fashion show, that she was involved in an affair with Heidi's husband Carl Costello (Paul Opacic) before arriving in the Village. Seth Costello (Miles Higson is angered by Theresa and Michaela's gossiping. Theresa and Nancy Hayton (Jessica Fox) go to a party with Mitzeee, where she attempts to teach them how to become a WAG. Theresa meets Logan Fairhurst (Thomas Sean Hughes), and an attraction grows. Theresa almost admits to killing Calvin, but stops when Logan tells her he is a police officer. After being attacked by Mitzeee, Theresa goes into labour and gives birth to a daughter. Carmel tells Theresa that she meant what she said, and will take her to the police for Calvin's murder. Theresa dumps Logan after being influenced by her family that it's for the best. Jacqui manages to convinces Carmel the baby will go into care even though that would be far more appropriate. Mercedes warns Carmel to stay quiet and let Theresa keep her baby and threatens to hand Carmel over to the police for child abduction if she refuses to co-operate.

When Theresa is home alone, she hears a knock on the door, she goes to answer it but there is no one there, she walks up to the bins and finds a black balloon with a picture of a fox on it, she goes back in the house and finds Warren, who accuses her of telling someone that he forced a weak man into the burning building after he escaped, revealing to the viewers that she knew the whole time that Warren wasn't dead. Warren recaps on how he escaped the fire, forcing her for answers of who she told, he threatens to drop her off the village wall arch, this leads her to confess that she killed Calvin. Police officer Ethan Scott (Craig Vye) arrives at the McQueens' home to question Carmel over Warren's fake death. He and Theresa talk and he later brings Kathleen to the McQueens' after she is caught using fake money. Ethan agrees not to arrest Kathleen if Theresa goes for a drink with him. Kathleen discovers the baby is Calvin's child and Theresa admits to killing him. She makes friends with Liberty Savage (Abi Phillips) and soon after discovers she is Ethan's fiancée. When Carmel arranges to christen the baby "Angel" without Theresa's consent, Kathleen is furious and brings her priest boyfriend round to conduct her granddaughter's christening in secret, and the baby is christened as "Kathleen Khloe Angel McQueen". After the christening, Mercedes reminds Carmel that if she doesn't want to go to jail, then she will comply with her demands. Heeding her sister's warning to save herself from going to prison, Carmel agrees to let Theresa keep her daughter.

Theresa hears rumours that Kyle is back in the village, and decides it is best for everyone if she leaves. As she is leaving, Kyle kidnaps Theresa and baby Kathleen-Angel, and takes them to an abandoned bank. He threatens to kill her but Theresa escapes and calls Warren, Carmel and Ethan. They arrive and they try to reason with Kyle, but a fight ensues and Ethan is thrown down a lift shaft and Kyle is shot and killed by Warren. Kathleen-Angel is also in the lift shaft, and when Ethan passes her up, Theresa tries to save Ethan. But while doing so, she falls into the shaft and the platform holding them up falls down to the bottom of the building. Theresa, Kathleen-Angel and Ethan are taken to hospital, where Theresa recovers. After recovering, she finds out that William Alexander is her father making Jacqui and Mercedes her half sisters. William claims that he is dying and needs a donated kidney from a blood relative to survive. As Jacqui doesn't trust him and Mercedes is engaged, Theresa volunteers. She visits him in hospital to find out that William has another daughter who is the one who really needs a kidney. Theresa looks through Kathleen's text messages and sees that she's been blackmailing him, demanding money or she'll tell Theresa his secret. The McQueens demand William and Kathleen to leave.

Liberty finds out Theresa fancies Ethan, after a brief fall out, they agree to tell each other about any boys they meet, although they both continue to have a relationship with Ethan without telling each other. After Theresa finds a note Liberty left for Ethan in his car, she goes to his apartment and punches him. With the help of one of Liberty's brothers, Dodger (Danny Mac), they spy on Ethan, only to find out he is seeing Rae Wilson (Alice Barlow). Theresa tells Liberty that Ethan's been dating the trio and they both tell Rae. One by one, they date Ethan in the same day, Rae pretending to have STD, Liberty pretending to propose and Theresa pretending she's expecting a second child, at the end of the episode, the three of them find him and dump him. Theresa begins to fall for Liberty's brother, Will Savage (James Atherton). After dumping Ethan, Will asks her on a date and Theresa accepts. Ethan however visits Theresa and tries to apologize. Theresa tries to get him to leave but Will arrives, thinking she and Ethan are sneaking around behind his back. Will leaves without letting Theresa explain. During Hollyoaks Later, Theresa mistakenly takes Carmel's passport so she is unable to join the Myra and Mercedes in Ibiza. Silas starts targeting Theresa as his next victim and she falls further into his trap by joining an online dating website. However, after Will and Theresa become a couple due to being set up by Rae, Silas then kills Rae.

Will starts to attend university, where he befriends newcomers Ash Kane (Holly Weston) and Annalise Appleton (Tamaryn Payne), and begins to neglect Theresa, seemingly ashamed of her. Frustrated and on a trip with the Freshers, Theresa decides to tell Will they are over. Theresa becomes attracted to Warren's son Joel Dexter (Andrew Still) and after going on several dates, the pair become a couple, making ex-boyfriend Will jealous. When Joel's mother Marie arrives to Hollyoaks, Theresa believes they are sleeping together but is later embarrassed when she discovers Marie is his mother. Theresa begins casually dating Dodger and it soon develops into a serious relationship. On the day of Texas' wedding, she burns a piece of paper that says 'Bride' on it. When Theresa finds a gun in the garage, she threatens to kill Dodger because he tried to get evidence on her as he believed she killed Texas but Will soon stops her. The day after, Theresa throws Dodger's clothes into a bin and sets them on fire but Jim throws a beer over it.

Carmel discovers that she has chlamydia and breaks up with her boyfriend Jim McGinn (Dan Tetsell). While trying to comfort her, Theresa recounts that she had chlamydia around the time they were both sleeping with Calvin, leading to Carmel realising that she has unknowingly had it ever since. As a result of her missed diagnosis, Carmel learns that she is unlikely to ever conceive a child, resulting in her obsessing over Kathleen-Angel and Theresa's poor parenting skills. On Christmas Eve, Theresa comes home with an expensive dollhouse for her daughter, despite previously mentioning that she had no money and when Carmel discovers her credit card missing, she later finds out that it was Theresa who had taken it, causing a feud to break out between the cousins. Carmel soon discovers that Theresa had been sending malicious messages to Dodger from a e-mail account belonging to Texas, and she tells Dodger causing him to split up with Theresa. Carmel is also arrested after the police accuse her of shoplifting a dollhouse, though in reality it was Theresa, leading to her feeling her chances of adopting a child were over. In a bid to get revenge on Carmel for facilitating her break-up with Dodger, Theresa climbs into bed with a drunk Jim and claims they had sex, though Nana soon uncovers the truth. Furious at Theresa's behaviour and neglect of Kathleen-Angel, Carmel hatches a plan and calls Sonny Valentine (now Aaron Fontaine) and introduces him to Kathleen-Angel. Carmel desperately tries to convince him to help him get Kathleen away from Theresa, and when Sonny refuses, Carmel blurts out that Theresa killed Calvin. Carmel soon regrets this and is horrified to discover that Sonny has joined the police force since leaving the village. Sonny confronts Theresa on the street, causing her to panic that she is about to be arrested, so Mercedes and Nana hatch a plot for Theresa to leave the country, and she reluctantly agrees to leave Kathleen-Angel with Carmel for the time being. Theresa and Mercedes head to the airport, but when Carmel finds that Kathleen is missing, she instantly thinks that Theresa has taken her on the run and quickly informs the police of Theresa's plan. Theresa is found at the airport, where she tries to evade the police but is soon caught. Carmel soon arrives at the airport, believing Theresa has taken Kathleen-Angel with her. However, Sonny shows up and reveals he took Kathleen-Angel. Theresa is then arrested. Sonny pressures Theresa during the interview and, despite Jim telling her not to say anything, she confesses to killing Calvin. Theresa is charged and Sonny allows Carmel to speak to her. Theresa asks Carmel to look after Kathleen-Angel and tell her she loves her.

On 25 August 2014, Theresa returns and seeks Mercedes' help with escaping from prison as she is pregnant with a second child and decides to flee to Alicante. She then rings Kathleen to see what Sonny is up to. Theresa manages to get herself admitted to hospital, with Mercedes pretending to be a doctor, and they both handcuff the prison officer to the bed and escape. When outside, Sonny is waiting for her and goes to re-arrest her but he is hit over the head by Myra which sets her free. Once back at Browning's flat, Theresa and Carmel each try to get Kathleen Angel to stay with them, and Theresa decides not to persuade her as she might get upset. Sonny then enters and Kathleen-Angel runs towards him and handcuffs Theresa to the radiator. Theresa calls Kathleen again and Kathleen tells her that she is in Spain. It is then revealed that Kathleen is in fact in hospital after being beaten by Sonny. Theresa is then found by the police and is again arrested.

Theresa returns to the village after evidence is found Sonny tricked Carmel into making a statement against her, she immediately goes into labour where she gives birth to Dodger's baby girl, naming her newborn Myra-Pocahontas Regina Madonna Savage-McQueen. Sonny pays Phoebe McQueen (Mandip Gill) to sabotage Theresa, but Theresa believes it is Sienna Blake (Anna Passey) - who has taken an interest in Myra-Pocahontas. Phoebe reveals this to Carmel, who drives out into the woods with a doll in the back, and Sonny follows her. Sonny then kidnaps Carmel, but she returns to the village, making her family believe she escaped. Carmel is actually working with Sonny to take Kathleen-Angel, and plans to abduct her on their cousin Porsche McQueen's (Twinnie-Lee Moore) wedding day, but she later backs out of the plan. At the reception, which takes place on a party train, Theresa discovers Kathleen-Angel's passport in Carmel's bag and is shocked. She and the rest of the McQueens disown Carmel, before Sonny sneaks onto the train using Carmel's invitation which she discarded. He attacks Theresa and attempts to throw her off the train, but at the same time, the train smashes into Sienna's car, which is on the tracks, and derails. Theresa wakes up and attempts to escape Sonny, but he holds her captive. Camel re-enters the wreckage and fools Sonny into letting Theresa go, but not before propane gas tanks are opened in the scuffle. As Theresa escapes the train, flames react with the gas and the wreckage explodes, instantly killing Sonny. Theresa rushes into the wreckage to find Carmel and locates her near death, and the pair apologize to each other and make up over their horrible history together. As the rest of the McQueens enter, Carmel peacefully passes away and Theresa retrieves her rosary beads from the wreckage. Theresa then finds Maxine Minniver (Nikki Sanderson) near death after giving birth, and calls an ambulance. As she heads to the hospital, Theresa offers to be a donor for Sienna and Dodger's daughter, Nico Blake (Persephone Swales-Dawson), who requires a kidney transplant, and learns she's a match.

Theresa clashes with Mercedes, who attempts to encourage the McQueens to disown Theresa after ruining Carmel's life more than once. When the McQueens refuse to do that, Mercedes tells the McQueens is her or Theresa. The McQueens choose Theresa, and throw Mercedes out of the house. Mercedes is then stabbed and is nowhere to be found and Theresa suspects that she might have flown to Alicante already to live with Jacqui. It is then revealed from the police that Mercedes has been murdered which devastates the McQueen's. Later that month Theresa decides to give Nico a transplant after she is in need of one due to being born with one which was not functioning. Her cousin Porsche finds out what she was going to do and tries to persuade her not to reminding her of what she had promised Carmel which was to be a good mother and pointed out that she couldn't do that if she wasn't there which changes her mind for a short time but she goes through with the operation anyway. When Theresa donates her kidney to Nico, she is injected with morphine by Sienna and is nearly killed. She is then upset as Dodger is nowhere to be found as he has been taken hostage by Sienna. She and Maxine decide to find Dodger as they discover that Sienna is constantly visiting Anna's house and they suspect Dodger is there. Theresa breaks into the house and discovers Dodger in the basement. Theresa attacks Sienna and calls the police. Sienna then makes an escape and flees to a mental hospital. Theresa then discovers that Maxine did not attend with her but she had been taken hostage by Patrick Blake (Jeremy Sheffield).

In January 2015, Maxine and Theresa are taken hostage by Will. Will ties them up under Dodger's boat and sets it on fire. Dodger saves Maxine and promises to come back for Theresa. Theresa is forced to rescue her herself and is hurt that Dodger saved Maxine instead of her. Theresa tells Dodger that Myra-Pocahontas is not his which upsets Dodger. Myra then tells Theresa to go after him and tell him that she lied. Theresa runs after Dodger to tell him that she loves him and that Myra-Pocahontas is his but is devastated to learn that Dodger has left the village. Theresa applies as a shop assistant and is employed by Simone Loveday (Jacqueline Boatswain). She then rants about Simone behind her back with Cindy. Simone is in the shop at the time and fires Theresa. She then applies to be a school secretary and is rejected by Patrick as she is wearing inappropriate clothing for the job. She then confronts Patrick and is then given the job but only as a trial. Patrick is impressed with her work and is appointed as a full-time secretary. Patrick then instructs Theresa to sabotage Maxine's friendship with Darren in order to get custody of Minnie. She goes on several dates with him but Darren discovers that she is working for Patrick. She then goes out to the club with Porsche and Maxine but Minnie is left at home alone and social services take Minnie into emergency custody which upsets Maxine and Patrick suspects that Theresa left her alone and thanks her. It is then revealed that Darren left her there by accident and Maxine gets full-custody of Minnie and Patrick instructs Theresa to get Minnie away from Maxine for good. Theresa and Patrick then talk and Theresa tells him that he is a better man than he was before. Theresa and Patrick then kiss. Theresa suspects that Patrick wants a relationship but he rejects her advances and it was a mistake. Theresa then discovers that Nico has started her period and she is not pregnant. Theresa accepts to keep Nico's secret but informs her that her mother faked a pregnancy and it didn't end well. Nico then tells Theresa to tell Patrick that she has lost the baby. Theresa then tells Patrick that Nico had a miscarriage and tells Patrick to ring her if he needs support.

Sienna Blake returns to the village after being released from a mental hospital and becomes suspicious of Theresa's intentions after catching her using Patrick's credit card in the village. After discovering Theresa is supporting Patrick, who has motor neurone disease, she becomes jealous as she wants to support her father. She then attempts to set Theresa up by transferring her father's money into Theresa's account to make her look like a gold-digger. Patrick fires Theresa and she flees to Spain with her kids terrified of going back to prison but returns a few weeks later and restarts her relationship with Patrick after he discovers what Sienna did. After Patrick's car is stolen where he hid the gun that shot Phoebe, he convinces Theresa to go on holiday with him. Theresa accepts and returns a few weeks later for Phoebe's funeral. After a jealous Sienna gets Patrick's insurance company to cancel his life assurance after discovering he was planning to leave his money all to Theresa he then tells her he wouldn't blame her if she wants to leave. Theresa however is furious that he thinks she would be so shallow and tells him she's looking after him because she loves him.

When Patrick becomes depressed as Maxine would be supporting Minnie and he doesn't have anything to give her, Theresa suggests conning the school. Patrick initially rejects but then accepts the idea, eventually leading to them getting a grant to build a special needs unit at the school. Theresa is devastated when she finds out that Patrick still loves Maxine so she throws her smoothie over him and demands half the scam money when its done. Patrick later has a change of heart over the scam and tells Theresa that its off, so on the advice of Ashley who was her former cellmate tries to reveal the scam but Patrick tricks her.

In March 2016, when Nico is told she will need another kidney transplant, she decides to kill Theresa for her last kidney. Theresa babysits Nico and while she is running a bath, Nico stands menacingly behind and contemplates drowning her but fails. She spikes a bottle of wine but when Theresa throws her a two-person party, she has a change of heart. However, Theresa drinks the wine and collapses. Fortunately Sienna arrives just in time and she is taken to hospital. Theresa plans to leave the Village but Myra tries to change her mind. After an emotional heart to heart with Myra, she decides to leave Theresa go. She says goodbye to Myra, John Paul and Myra's boyfriend Diego Salvador Martinez Hernandez De La Cruz (Juan Pablo Yepez). Theresa feels like she has forgotten something but shakes it off. As the taxi leaves, Myra sees that she has forgotten her daughter Myra-Pocohontas.

== Reception ==
Jorgie Porter made the British Soap Awards shortlist in 2009 and was nominated for 'Best Newcomer' for her portrayal of Theresa. At the 2010 awards, Porter was nominated for 'Sexiest Female' and 'Best Actress'. Porter was nominated in the categories of "Best Actress" and "Sexiest Female" at the 2011 awards. She has also been nominated for the award of 'Best Serial Drama Performance' at the 2011 National Television Awards. At the 2012 British Soap awards, she was nominated for 'Sexiest Female'. In 2021, she was longlisted for "Funniest Performance" for the Inside Soap Awards for her role as Theresa. She was also longlisted for "Best Comic Performance" at the 2024 Inside Soap Awards.
