= McQueen family =

Fictional family on Hollyoaks, created 2006

- Hollyoaks family
- The McQueen family unit in 2022 (left to right: John Paul, Bobby, Mercedes, Theresa, Sally, Goldie, Marlena, Cleo, Olivia, Prince and Cher)
- First appearance: 11 January 2006
- Created by: Bryan Kirkwood
- Introduced by: Bryan Kirkwood
- Duration: 2006–present

The McQueen family is a fictional family in the Channel 4 soap opera Hollyoaks. The family first appeared in 2006 and the family have been involved in a number of the show's most high-profile storylines, most notably John Paul McQueen's (James Sutton) affair with Craig Dean (Guy Burnet); Jacqui McQueen's (Claire Cooper) whirlwind relationship with Tony Hutchinson (Nick Pickard); Myra McQueen's (Nicole Barber-Lane) long-lost son Niall Rafferty's (Barry Sloane) revenge on his family by holding them hostage in an abandoned church and blowing it up, ultimately killing his half-sister Tina Reilly (Leah Hackett); Theresa McQueen's (Jorgie Porter) pregnancy by her cousin Carmel McQueen's (Gemma Merna) fiancé Calvin Valentine (Ricky Whittle) and later shooting him dead on their wedding day; Mercedes McQueen's (Jennifer Metcalfe) affair with her fiancé Riley Costello's (Rob Norbuy) father Carl (Paul Opacic); being kidnapped by Riley's grandfather Silas Blissett (Jeff Rawle), Jacqui coping with the death of her husband Rhys Ashworth (Andrew Moss) in a bus crash, learning that he had been having an affair with Cindy Cunningham (Stephanie Waring) and that he got Sinead O'Connor (Stephanie Davis) pregnant; Mercedes stalking Mitzeee (Rachel Shenton) and stabbing herself and framing her; Carmel's facial disfigurement; Myra faking her own death to escape her daughter Mercedes' evil husband, Dr. Paul Browning (Joseph Thompson); Mercedes killing her husband Doctor Browning by striking him over the head with a shovel; John Paul's male rape at the hands of his pupil Finn O'Connor (Keith Rice); the train crash which ultimately killed Carmel; Mercedes faking her death to help Grace Black (Tamara Wall) get revenge on Freddie Roscoe (Charlie Clapham); Theresa donating her kidney to Nico Blake (Persephone Swales-Dawson); Porsche (Twinnie-Lee Moore) and Cleo McQueen's (Nadine Rose Mulkerrin) sexual abuse at the hands of their mother Reenie McQueen's (Zöe Lucker) fiancé Pete Buchanan (Kai Owen); Phoebe McQueen's (Mandip Gill) murder in hospital by the Gloved Hand Killer; the stillbirth of Mercedes' baby Gabriel; John Paul's transgender boss Sally St. Claire (Annie Wallace) being revealed as his biological father, Mercedes being framed for drugs by Joanne Cardsley (Rachel Leskovac), Celine McQueen (Sarah George) and Diego Salvador Martinez Hernandez De La Cruz's (Juan Pablo Yepez) sham wedding for money; Celine being murdered by her ex-boyfriend and serial killer Cameron Campbell (Cameron Moore) after discover he causes the fire at the fair on Halloween 2016; Hunter affair with his teacher Neeta Kaur (Amrit Maghera), leads his feud with his fiance Mac Nightingale (David Easter); Prince's marriage to Lily Drinkwell (Lauren McQueen) and Breda turning out to be a serial killer.

== History ==
Queenie McQueen had at least two children, daughters Marlena and Marguerite. Marlena has several children by several different fathers, including daughters Kathleen, Myra, Reenie and son Louis. Marlena fell pregnant with Kathleen in her early 20s. She married a man named Reggie soon after. They had one daughter, Myra. Reggie and Marlena divorced after several arguments and affairs like every other McQueen . It is unknown who are the fathers of Kathleen, Reenie and Louis.

At age 14, Myra fell for the charms of Martin Brownlow and they began a relationship. They slept together and Myra fell pregnant by Martin, who left her. Ashamed of this, Marlena forced Myra keep her pregnancy a secret. When the baby arrived, Myra and Marlena left the baby, named Matthew, on the doorstep of a church with only a note as an explanation. The baby was subsequently put into care as Myra promised to return for her son one day. After this, Myra began a relationship with a man named Billy Alexander and became pregnant with her eldest daughter Jacqui one year after she had Matthew; Jacqui had always assumed she was the eldest. Myra chose to keep Jacqui instead of going through the pain of giving up another child. Myra had her second daughter with Billy one year later and named her Mercedes. Billy left Myra and his daughters soon after Mercedes was born. At aged 19, Myra gave birth to Tina following a one-night stand with a married man named Marvin Bassman who refused to be involved in his daughter's life. She named her daughter after Tina Turner. Later that year in 1985, Myra met Ricky Bowen and began a relationship with him. Myra had Carmel with Ricky. Two years later, while Ricky and Myra were on a break, she gave birth to a son called John Paul by a projectionist she met at a Chester cinema called Iain Naismith, however he left her so that he could transition into his female alter-ego, Sally St. Claire. Myra lied to Ricky and told him John Paul was his son. Finally, Myra had Michaela in 1991 by Ricky again. Ricky left the family in 1992 and later married and had another son named Richard.

Kathleen had one daughter who she named Theresa, Theresa's father was believed to be a man named Don, but it was later revealed that Billy Alexander was her father after Kathleen had a one-night stand with him at a nightclub. It is assumed Kathleen lied to Don about Theresa being his daughter.

Louis went on to join the army and has a son who was also called Louis. Louis Sr. was killed in action, this inspired Louis Jr. to follow in his father's footsteps and enroll in the army too.

Reenie was repeatedly raped by Marlena's abusive boyfriend Derek Clough, which she kept a secret from the rest of her family; he impregnated her at 15 and she later gave birth to her daughter Porsche in 1991. Reenie was originally supposed to give Porsche up for adoption but decided against it. For years it was believed by everyone that Porsche's father was a boy named Mickey, who grew up in the same estate as the McQueens. Reenie had another two daughters with Porsche's presumed father Mickey. She gave birth to Celine in 1994 and then finally in 1998, she gave birth to Cleo. When the girls were young, Mickey was sentenced to life imprisonment for murder. Reenie's boyfriend, Pete Buchanan, subjected Porsche, Celine and Cleo to varying levels of abuse, most notably sexually abusing Porsche and Cleo and damaging Celine's confidence. There was an incident one Christmas where Derek got excessively drunk and punched Marlena, ultimately breaking her jaw.

Marguerite was married to a pig farmer and they had at least four children, including Breda, Victor and Valene. Marguerite's husband was a violent alcoholic who would beat her and their daughters Breda and Valene. He supposedly died after drunkenly falling down the stairs and hitting his head, but it was later revealed Breda murdered him. Their son Victor continually shamed and disappointed his family by getting involved in crime and drugs. Victor married a woman named Sarah in the late 1980s. Sarah gave birth to Victor's son Bart. Victor was an unfaithful husband which ruined his marriage. Sarah left when Bart was five. Soon after the breakdown of his marriage, Victor remarried a woman named Joan. Joan immediately took on the responsibility of being Bart's mother and stayed loyal to Victor and his son even though Victor took advantage of her good nature and found it difficult to stay faithful. Joan died in 2010.

Breda became a nanny and was devoted to the children she cared for. She was also a strict Catholic woman, married to a man named Vinnie Bletcher. On Christmas Day 1986, while pregnant with her and Vinnie's daughter, Goldie, Breda brought toys to the home of her charge, three-year-old Peter, who was being raised by an abusive father called Wes after his mother, Harriet, abandoned them. Wes was about to hit Peter before Breda bludgeoned him over the head with an angel ornament. After murdering his father, Breda took Peter in and adopted him, renaming him Sylver. They lived on a farm but Vinnie became abusive towards his Sylver and Goldie. Adoptive second cousins, Sylver and Mercedes, lost their virginity to each other when they were 14 years old. Soon after, thirteen-year-old Goldie learns she is pregnant to boyfriend Shane Sweeney. When a drunken Vinnie discovered this, he went flew into a violent rage, threatening Goldie and her unborn baby. During a struggle, Sylver pushed Vinnie down the stairs. Believing he had killed his stepfather, a terrified Sylver called the police. When Breda discovered Vinnie was still alive, she delivered the fatal blow that killed him. Breda allowed Sylver to think he had killed Vinnie and he went to prison for eighteen years. While in prison, Sylver had a fling with a dental hygienist named Kelly Winters, who became pregnant with their daughter Cher. Goldie gave birth to twins, Prince and Hunter. Marguerite has at least one other son who died in prison after being incarcerated for arson. Valene has not yet been mentioned.

== In Hollyoaks ==
In 2006, Michaela was the first McQueen to be seen on-screen in Hollyoaks. Michaela's first appearance was retconed as she had the last name of "Jones" and was stated as living in a rough part of the village with her grandmother. Michaela was later seen at her best friend Amy Barnes' house with her father Mike, who was embarrassing his daughter, but made Michaela happy. She pressured Amy into having sex with her short-term boyfriend, Ste Hay, so that her boyfriend, Wayne Tunnicliffe, would not dump her. Michaela claimed she had had sex with her previous boyfriend, Paul, and that a girl had to put out in order to attract boys. When Ste dumped Amy, Michaela's nasty streak became apparent as she abandoned her friend and teased her, before going off with Wayne and Ste, leaving Amy upset and alone. When Amy stood up to her, they had a fight in the playground. However, the next day Michaela got a taste of her own medicine when she was dumped by Wayne. He dumped her by text message, saying he only went out with her because she was easy. Amy and Michaela reconciled as friends, but Michaela then led her to shoplifting. Michaela was then retconned into being a McQueen with a large family and a mother. The next McQueen to make an appearance was her sister, Mercedes. The pair pulled off a scam at Evissa, in which Mercedes claimed to have been injured during a massage. The only McQueen not to appear was Jacqui, the explanation being that she was in prison for shoplifting. When she finally arrived, she came in tow with an old friend named Davey, who wanted his money from her. Carmel had already found this money and had spent it on breast implants. Davey left after Jacqui agreed to do him any favour. When he returned, he made Jacqui marry illegal immigrant, Aleksander Malota. Carmel and Alek fell for one another and began an affair, just as Jacqui fell for Tony Hutchinson. Being the only male, John Paul appeared to be pressured into "keeping the family name". His family had mixed opinions when he came out as gay. He began a relationship with his supposedly straight best friend, Craig Dean. Their affair began one of the shows' most popular pairings known by fans as McDean.

Mercedes had begun a relationship with Russ Owen and they became engaged. Tina also got engaged to Dom Reilly. The pairs eventually settled on a double-marriage, the marriage of Russ and Mercedes was short lived when he discovered she had sex with Warren Fox. Michaela began smoking marijuana, under the influence of Ste Hay and Nige Foster. After their affair was exposed, John Paul and Craig decided to leave for Dublin, however after realising Craig could not face his sexuality, John Paul left him at the airport. Jacqui and Tony had begun trying for a child. When she became pregnant, Jacqui lost the baby and was told she could not have children. Tony became agitated when everyone assumed Alek had been the father of the baby. Carmel decided to run away with Alek, however he could not take her away from her family so left her. Jacqui was shocked to discover Tony had a ten-year-old son named Harry Thomson. She became increasingly frustrated and jealous and told Tony to choose between her and his son. After he chose Harry, Jacqui left him. At this time, a drunken Mercedes comforted Tony and the pair had sex. Mercedes fell pregnant and decided to have an abortion. Jacqui pleaded with her to have the baby for her, not realising it was Tony's. Knowing this, Mercedes went ahead with the abortion leaving Jacqui devastated. Myra offered herself as a surrogate mother for Jacqui; however, realising Myra would have to go through yet another pregnancy, Jacqui refused. Tina then became the surrogate. After being neglected by Dom, Tina had sex with Russ.

The McQueen sisters (L-R: Jacqui, Michaela, Tina, Carmel and Mercedes).

A stranger arrived in Hollyoaks as a new hairstylist at Evissa. Niall Rafferty was soon revealed as a secret child of Myra, who she had been forced to give up when she was 14. Niall befriended most of the McQueens but fell under suspicion of Jacqui. He soon began putting in a plan of revenge. Local priest, Kieron Hobbs arrived to stay with The McQueens. Soon after this, he and John Paul began a secret relationship. Tina became pregnant, but soon discovered Russ was the biological father. Niall injected Michaela with heroin to make her family believe she was an addict. Niall began having feelings for Steph Dean, and was jealous when she engaged to Max Cunningham. Carmel began a relationship with Calvin Valentine, whom she got engaged to. Niall was distraught on the day of Steph and Max's wedding. He ended up accidentally running over and killing Max as a result of his anger. Tina decided to give her unborn child up for adoption, Niall, overhearing this, ended up pushing her down a flight of stairs. Tina gave birth to Max McQueen and as a cause and had to go under an emergency hysterectomy. Due to this, Tina decided to keep Max for herself as she could never have a child of her own. Niall and Steph soon began a relationship. The pair were caught out by John Paul and Kieron, who were also continuing their affair.

Myra decided to track down her first-born son with the help of Kieron. Kieron tracked down the foster mother of Matthew, who then showed him a photograph of Niall. Craig returned to Hollyoaks to win back John Paul, only to find him engaged to Kieron. Kieron approached Niall with the picture. Niall revealed the truth and agreed to confess to Myra. Panicking, Niall laced Kieron's beer with pills. Kieron collapsed and died in his arms. Niall covered up the death by making it look like suicide. Niall was infuriated when John Paul decided to leave for Dublin with Craig. Niall put pills in John Paul's beer and attempted to kill him, however John Paul swapped their drinks after spilling Niall's. Mercedes had begun a relationship with Malachy Fisher, however was shocked to discover he has HIV. Niall discovered Jack Osborne had been responsible for jailing his birth father Martin. Martin died in prison as a result of his conviction. Niall then attacked Jack and told him who he really was. Niall then took his final revenge on the McQueens by kidnapping them one by one and holding them hostage in the church he had been abandoned at birth. An injured Jack sought the help of Darren Osborne, Tony and Dom to save the McQueens. With the truth revealed, Niall asked Myra 6 questions. For each one she got right, she could choose one of her children to live and each she got wrong, she could choose one to die. Myra ended up getting two questions right. Mercedes told Myra to choose her to die as she may have HIV; she then admitted to Jacqui that she had sex with Tony. John Paul also offered himself to die. Myra then made the tough decision and chose Jacqui and Carmel to die, therefore leaving Michaela and Tina alive. Jack, Darren, Tony and Dom made their way into the church just as Niall detonated explosives.

The church lay in ruins after the explosion. A trapped Myra had a heart to heart with Niall and forgave him. A statue then fell, supposedly killing Niall. The McQueens all escaped, until they discovered Tina had tragically been killed after being crushed by rubble. Jacqui decided to raise Max as her own, but refused to forgive Tony, Mercedes or Myra. John Paul and Craig finally moved to Dublin shortly after the events. The McQueens were informed that Niall was still alive and had escaped the church. Jacqui told Russ that he could see his son whenever he wanted, however her promise was quickly broken. Mercedes and Malachy ended getting married in Belfast. Niall returned and followed Steph to Scotland. After a failed attempt at trying to win her back, Niall killed himself by dropping over a cliff. The McQueens were informed and agreed not to grieve. Theresa, the niece of Myra, arrived in Hollyoaks to stay with her family, who were still picking up the shattered pieces of their lives. On her arrival, under-aged Theresa had sex with Tony, who did not know her real age. Jacqui got him arrested for it as revenge for having sex with Mercedes, however dropped the charges. Mercedes was nervous as her HIV test results returned, however they were negative. Russ became increasingly needy for Max, and contemplated kidnapping him. Finally, Russ did so leaving Jacqui devastated and furious at Carmel for letting him take him. Theresa began a secret fling with Barry Newton, this then developed into a full relationship. Jacqui left for France after a possible sighting of Russ in order to retrieve Max. Weeks later, she returned without Max. She was horrified to find out Tony had begun a relationship with Cindy Cunningham, and she later began a relationship with Rhys Ashworth. In 2011, Jacqui kisses Rhys's best friend Gilly following an argument; however Gilly then rapes her. Gilly denies the allegations and is freed of a prison sentence, however he eventually admits to it and moves away. In late 2009, Theresa's mother Kathleen McQueen made an appearance. In August 2010, cousin Bart McQueen moved in with the family, and Michaela moved away to study journalism the same month, however returned a year later.

Calvin cheated on Carmel with both her sister Mercedes and cousin Theresa, and ended up getting Theresa pregnant. Calvin refused to stay with Theresa and their new baby, Kathleen Khloe McQueen, and in revenge Theresa shot Calvin dead at his second wedding to Carmel. The McQueen's discover Theresa's guilt although agree to protect her. Carmel is devastated by Theresa's actions although agrees not to tell the police, knowing that Kati would be taken in to foster care. They frame local gangster Kyle as the murderer, and he dies later on.

Despite the HIV results being negative, Mercedes lied that they're positive and Malachy is furious when he discovers the truth. Malachy later dies in a fire. After this, Mercedes becomes engaged to wealthy footballer Riley Costello, but begins an affair with his father Carl Costello. On their wedding day, Mercedes eventually admits to the affair and Riley ends their marriage. Mercedes, who is heavily pregnant with Riley's son, is then kidnapped by Riley's serial killer grandfather Silas Blissett and is held hostage in a basement, with Silas promising to murder her once the baby is born. Silas is eventually exposed and arrested, however and Mercedes is rescued and gives birth to baby Bobby, although Riley refuses to take her back. Riley begins dating Mitzeee Minniver and in an attempt to split them up, Mercedes stabs herself and frames Mitzeee for it, resulting in Mitzeee going to prison and Mercedes and Riley getting back together. Myra discovers Mercedes's lies, however, and reports her to the police. That same day, Riley is accidentally shot dead, and Mercedes uses his death to escape a prison sentence, blaming the stabbing on Riley.

In 2012, Jacqui and Rhys adopt homeless teenager Phoebe McQueen and Rhys is killed in a bus crash later this year, leaving Jacqui distraught and even more upset when she discovers he had been having an affair with Cindy Cunningham. Later in 2012, John Paul returns home from Dublin for Christmas and on the same day a baby is found outside the house. Myra names the baby Jesus, despite knowing that she he will have to go to social services. John Paul later reveals that the baby is his and Craig’s. John Paul also reveals how he and Craig have broken up. He decides to keep the baby and names him Matthew Jesus McQueen. This same year, Nana McQueen moves in with the family and Michaela leaves again to go touring with her boyfriend's band. Jacqui gets into trouble with gangster Trevor Royale when she and business partner Trudy Ryan attempt to con him for extra money after Mercedes is kidnapped by Clare Devine who demands £200,000 from the McQueen's in exchange for Mercedes's life. She and Phoebe then find out that Trevor is smuggling illegal immigrants which Jacqui sets free. Jacqui, realizing that Trevor will hunt her down for what she has done, is forced to flee the country in order to protect her family from Trevor`s revenge and leaves, saying a tearjerking goodbye to Tony, whom she had reconciled with. Mercy later finds Jacqui in Allecante and says a farewell to her sister. The McQueens work with Jim McGinn and Mercedes's new boyfriend, Dr Browning to convince Trevor that Jacqui is dead and manage to pull it off, using a fake casket and a Jane Doe dead body from the hospital. Myra interferes in Mercedes and Browning`s relationship when she finds out that he murdered Lynsey Nolan. Browning discreetly tries to get Trevor to kill Myra, even attempting to do it himself. Browning finally convinces Trevor when he tells him that Jacqui is still alive. On 3 September 2013, Mercedes goes under cover, pretending to love her husband Doctor Browning after she, Myra and Jim McGinn find out that he had paid Trevor to murder Myra. She discovers that the murder is happening sooner than planned but Myra manages to escape to a Church where she summons her family: Carmel, John Paul, Theresa, Phoebe, Matthew, Kati and Nana, and says a tearful goodbye, remarking that she has already said goodbye to Mercedes and called Michaela. Doctor Browning finds out that Mercy was lying and races to the docks to stop Myra from fleeing on a boat organized by Jim. He makes it in time and Myra begs him to think of Mercedes and her children but Browning pulls the trigger and Myra plummets into the sea, although she was later shown alive, having worn a bullet proof vest during her stand off with Browning. Myra later flees the country after a tearful goodbye with John Paul. Doctor Browning is later arrested when the police arrive after he shots Myra. A few weeks later, Doctor Browning attempts suicide to get out of prison. When he escapes the ambulance taking him to the hospital, he arrives in Hollyoaks, where he runs over Clare Devine, killing her. He later captures Mercedes and takes her back to the McQueen family house. Unknown to Doctor Browning and Mercedes, Cindy and Lindsey followed them and the trio end up killing Doctor Browning in self-defence. They later hide the body in the attic of Mercedes' house but everyone else in the house begins to notice a horrible smell, they move the body into the Price Slice freezer. Later, with the help of Freddie Roscoe, they push Doctor Browning's car, with the body inside, off a cliff and then setting it on fire to make it look like a suicide and also setting him up for D.I. Trent's murder. Also, that week, Theresa goes on a road trip with her first cousin, Louis McQueen.

In 2014, Carmel discovers that she has chlamydia. She initially believes that her boyfriend Jim has cheated on her and has given her the disease but later finds out that she has had chlamydia for the past four years after Theresa reveals that she gave chlamydia to Calvin, who in turn gave it to Carmel, also revealing that Carmel is now infertile. Carmel later starts a feud with Theresa and also reunites with Jim, who proposes to her. Later, Carmel exposes Theresa's emails that prove Theresa is pretending to be her boyfriend Dodger's dead ex Texas, ultimately breaking up Dodger and Theresa. This infuriates Theresa, who then gets a drunken Jim to sleep in her bed and makes it look like the pair had sex but Nana soon uncovers the truth. Carmel then gets in contact with Calvin's brother Sonny Valentine, who is now a policeman and reveals to him that Theresa murdered Calvin. The pair later hatch a plan to get Kati away from Theresa. The police attempt to arrest Theresa for Calvin's murder, but she escapes, taking Kati with her. Later that month, John Paul is raped by Finn O'Connor. The next month, Jim is stabbed to death by Fraser Black, who makes it look like Jim is responsible for all of his crimes. This devastates Carmel, who later begins a relationship with Sonny, whom she later gets engaged to. After Jim's death, Myra returns to visit for family, revealing that she is living with Jacqui in Spain. Myra later leaves that same night. John Paul is later arrested for attacking Robbie Roscoe. When he gets out a few months later, he begins a relationship with Ste Hay. Nana later gets the family into financial difficulty and they later get evicted. Their house is soon bought by Grace Black, who agrees to let them rent it. Later, Mercedes buys a third of The Loft as part of a scheme with Freddie, which angers Grace. Mercedes later begins a relationship with Freddie but it soon ends after Mercedes discovers Freddie and Lindsey in bed together. In August, John Paul finally confides in his family about his rape ordeal and Finn is arrested by the police, also Theresa gets in contact with her mum, Kathleen, in order to help Theresa get rid of Sonny. Kathleen later discovers that Sonny is an alcoholic, and she later goes into partnership with Phoebe and Mercedes to get rid of him. Sonny later brutally attacked Kathleen and told her family she had stolen Carmel's money. In a bid to get rid of Sonny, Myra concocts a plan with Mercedes and Phoebe to drive him to a lake and handcuff him. When they arrive at the lake, Myra, Mercedes and Phoebe all leave the car, although Myra accidentally leaves the handbrake on and the car rolls into the water with Sonny inside. Later, Mercedes and Phoebe visit Theresa in her hiding place, where Theresa reveals that she is pregnant. Later, the charges against Theresa are dropped after the McQueen's make it look as though Sonny manipulated Theresa in to admitting to Calvin's murder, and she goes on to give birth to Dodger Savage's baby daughter, Myra-Pocahontas Savage-McQueen. Theresa eventually realises that somebody is framing her to look like a bad mother, and Carmel becomes prime suspect. It later transpires that Phoebe is framing Theresa, and it is revealed that she is working for Sonny, who is in fact alive and plotting revenge on all the McQueens. Phoebe continues to manipulate the situation for Sonny, which eventually culminates with Theresa and Carmel fighting and Myra throwing Carmel out. Phoebe later manipulates Carmel into leaving with Kati, although when driving through a country lane, Carmel realises she is being followed. When she gets out of her car to see who it is, it transpires to be Sonny, believing that she has brought Kati with her. It emerges that Carmel has in fact brought a doll, and Sonny chases her through the woods. Carmel then goes missing for several days with no explanation.

In November 2014, Myra's niece Porsche arrives to announce she is engaged to Lockie Campbell, much to John Paul's disgust. Eventually, Carmel reappears in the village, going to the police and telling them what Sonny did to her. She explains that she can't remember where he took her, and she is delighted to be reunited with Myra, Phoebe, Theresa, Mercedes, Nana, John Paul and Porsche. When planning for Porsche's wedding to Lockie, Carmel sneaks off and calls Sonny, telling him that all the McQueens are going to be on a party train for Porsche and Lockie's wedding reception, implying that they are both planning on abducting Kati. On the day of the wedding, Carmel drives to the location where Sonny is, and explains that she can't go through with stealing Kati for him, and returns to the wedding. Back at the church, John Paul tells Porsche that Lockie has attempted to kiss him, but the pair get married anyway. During the party train, Theresa discovers that Carmel was planning on abducting Kati and tells the rest of the family and they disown her. Unbeknownst to the McQueen family, Sonny is on board the train and when Phoebe notices him, he brutally attacks her and leaves her locked in the toilet. After attacking Phoebe, Sonny grabs Theresa and hangs her outside the train, in an attempt to kill her. Meanwhile, Sienna Blake's car is stuck on the railway track after a collision with her father, Patrick, and she and Maxine Minniver are terrified when they notice the McQueen party train come towards them. The two women make it out of the car just in time, as the train hits the car and the train de-rails from the track and turning onto its side.

Carmel is the first person to awaken from unconsciousness, and notices her cousin, Celine trapped underneath a table, and helps her out. She then realizes that Myra has badly injured her leg, while Porsche emerges from the rubble. Mercedes then appears, as does Lockie's brother, Cameron. Lockie and John Paul, however, are trapped under rubble in a different section of the train, while Dodger has badly injured his head. Carmel then exits the train to try to get help, while Sienna enters the wreckage to retrieve Dodger. Sonny and Theresa are both trapped separately from the rest of the party, and when Theresa regains consciousness, she tries to escape Sonny but he also awakens and keeps her hostage in the wreckage. As Mercedes and Cameron both save Phoebe from the wreckage, the fire brigade arrive and help most of the party out. Lockie and John Paul are then rescued by the fire brigade, which relieves Porsche. Carmel realizes that Sonny has Theresa and dashes back into the wreckage, and after noticing a gas canister leaking, she convinces Sonny that they have a future together in order to manipulate him, which makes him loosen his grip on Theresa who escapes just as the train explodes, sending Theresa and most of the wedding party flying across the railway track. After regaining consciousness, Theresa runs back into the wreckage, where she finds Carmel trapped under heavy debris. Carmel confesses to Theresa that she was going to run away with Kati and Sonny, and Theresa forgives her. They finally make amends over their past feud before Myra, Mercedes and Phoebe all enter the wreckage to say their goodbyes to Carmel, apologising for their harsh words. After telling the family that she forgives them for the horrible things that they said to her, Carmel asks Myra to tell her a story, and she dies with her family around her. John Paul then enters the wreckage and is distraught to find his sister deceased, as he never had chance to apologize for the things that he said to her. At the hospital, John Paul reveals the devastating news of Carmel's death to a distraught Nana, and Mercedes forces Myra to choose between her and Theresa, as Mercedes believes that Theresa ruined the final years of Carmel's life.

The following week, Myra reveals that she has refused to choose between Mercedes and Theresa, and when Mercedes attacks Myra to choose, both Nana and John Paul ask Mercedes to leave for a few days. When Carmel's body is brought to the McQueen household, Nana notices that the ring on her finger has disappeared, and the entire family immediately blame Mercedes. Mercedes is disgusted and reveals to the McQueens how much she loved Carmel, before leaving the house. On the day of Carmel's funeral, Mercedes spots Freddie and Lindsey kissing in the hospital after Lindsey gives birth to Freddie's brother, Joe's baby son. Mercedes blackmails Freddie into buying her share of The Loft, however, she then visits Grace and offers her her share of The Loft too, in a bid to see who will pay more so she can leave the country for Alicante. Mercedes later gets drunk and arrives at Carmel's funeral, hurling abuse at Myra, Theresa and Phoebe, before Myra reveals that she wished Mercedes had died instead of Carmel. Mercedes then flees the church, devastated. Back at the McQueen household, Mercedes waits for either Freddie or Grace to arrive with the highest amount of money, but an unknown figure enters the house, grabs a knife and stabs Mercedes to death. Mercedes' corpse is then seen being dragged out of the house, and the figure mopping up all of her blood. The figure is later revealed to be Freddie. Meanwhile, at the wake of Carmel's funeral, Porsche reveals that she was the culprit who stole Carmel's ring, and not Mercedes. The entire family then rush home to try and catch Mercedes in time, but when she is not there, they all believe she has left for Alicante. The following day, Phoebe is suspicious of Mercedes' whereabouts and calls the police, with old friend D.S Thorpe questioning Myra. She explains that Phoebe is just being over-dramatic, and when she spills a cup of tea, D.S Thorpe notices blood on the floor, and calls for forensic scientists. He then reveals that he believes that Mercedes has been murdered in the kitchen, much to Myra's despair. Later that day, D.S Thorpe arrests Freddie for killing Mercedes. However, Lindsey's sister Kim Butterfield provides Freddie with a false alibi, which gets Freddie out of the frame. The police later ask Porsche to perform a reconstruction of Mercedes' last movements, which she reluctantly agrees to in order to find Mercedes' murderer. Grace is suspicious of Freddie and confronts him on The Loft balcony, where he continuously denies killing Mercedes, and after innocently pushing her away, she falls from the balcony and is hospitalised.

When Joe is confronting Freddie about the murder of Mercedes, they are unaware that Myra is overhearing everything, until she makes a noise when she leaves. Freddie later tries to convince Myra that he had nothing to do with Mercedes' murder, which Myra refuses to believe. Myra leaves the village once again. Elsewhere, Theresa agrees to be a kidney donor for Sienna's teenage daughter, Nico Blake. Porsche continuously tries to talk Theresa out of it, as they believe that Sienna caused the train accident that killed Carmel. Theresa explains that Carmel would have wanted her to become a good person, but Porsche reminds Theresa of the risks and if she dies, then who will look after her children. Theresa then tells Nico and Sienna that she cannot be a donor, with Sienna insulting Theresa. Afterwards, Theresa has a change of heart and decides to be Nico's donor, but after the operation, Theresa is given far too much morphine and has to be examined by Dr. Charles S'avage. It is later revealed that Sienna gave Theresa the overdose as she does not want Theresa to get too close to her twin brother, Dodger. Celine, meanwhile, has been hired by the local hospital and makes friends with Kim and Tegan Lomax.

It is then revealed that Mercedes is actually alive, and faked her death as part of a money scam. She returns to the village, however shortly after Phoebe is murdered by serial killer Lindsey Butterfield. Later, when Porsche and Celine's sister Cleo, mother Reenie and stepfather Pete arrive, Porsche reveals that Pete sexually abused her and Cleo when they were kids and made Celine feel insecure, however the family forgive him. Pete and Cleo secretly embark on a sick affair, and when it is discovered, Celine attempts to kill Pete. Pete then escapes and begins living in a van. Cleo visits him and they continue their affair. Reenie reveals that Nana's ex-boyfriend Derek also abused her when she was younger and as a result of these revelations, Porsche, Reenie and Nana all end up leaving the village with Porsche having split up with Lockie after he embarked on separate affairs with both Mercedes and John Paul. Myra then returns to the village with her new boyfriend, Spanish hunk Diego. Theresa leaves the village a few months later in order to start a new life in Spain.

Mercedes reveals that she is pregnant with Joe Roscoe's baby and they begin a relationship however Joe gets back together with his ex-wife Lindsey, realising he still loves her. When Joe discovers that Lindsey is a serial killer, Lindsey escapes and their relationship is over. Bart was murdered by Warren Fox and, with help from Sienna Blake, his body was hidden in Sally's loft until they could move it into the freshly-dug grave of Amy Barnes.

John Paul decides to leave town with Matthew for a teaching position in Singapore. Not that long after the two leave the village, it is revealed that he and Craig have reunited and are raising their son in Singapore.

== Generations ==
- Queenie McQueen (deceased)
  - Marlena McQueen, daughter of Queenie, married Reggie
    - Kathleen McQueen, daughter of Marlena
      - Theresa McQueen, daughter of Kathleen and Billy Alexander
        - Kathleen-Angel McQueen, daughter of Theresa and Calvin Valentine
        - Myra-Pocahontas Savage-McQueen, daughter of Theresa and Dodger Savage
    - Myra McQueen, daughter of Marlena and Reggie
      - Niall Rafferty (deceased), son of Myra and Martin Brownlow
      - Jacqui McQueen, daughter of Myra and Billy Alexander, married Aleksander Malota, Rhys Ashworth (deceased)
        - Phoebe McQueen (deceased), adoptive daughter of Jacqui and Rhys
      - Mercedes McQueen, daughter of Myra and Billy Alexander, married Russ Owen (deceased), Malachy Fisher (deceased), Dr. Paul Browning (deceased) and Sylver McQueen (deceased)
        - Bobby Costello, son of Mercedes and Riley Costello (deceased)
        - Gabriel McQueen (deceased), son of Mercedes and Joe Roscoe (deceased)
        - Maria-Carmella McQueen, daughter of Mercedes and Felix Westwood
        - Maria-Gabriella Fox-McQueen, daughter of Mercedes and Warren Fox
      - Tina Reilly (deceased), daughter of Myra and Marvin Bassman, married Dominic Reilly
        - Max Owen, son of Tina and Russ Owen
      - Carmel McQueen (deceased), daughter of Myra and Ricky Bowen, married Calvin Valentine (deceased)
      - John Paul McQueen, son of Myra and Sally St. Claire, married Ste Hay
        - Matthew-Jesus McQueen, son of John Paul and Craig Dean; born via a surrogate, Chloe Chance
      - Michaela McQueen, daughter of Myra and Ricky Bowen
      - Carmina McQueen, daughter of Myra and Diego Salvador Martinez Hernandez De La Cruz
    - Reenie McQueen, daughter of Marlena and Len Murphy, married Pete Buchanan
      - Porsche McQueen, daughter of Reenie and Derek Clough (deceased), married Lockie Campbell (deceased)
      - Celine McQueen (deceased), daughter of Reenie
      - Cleo McQueen, daughter of Reenie
    - Louis McQueen (deceased), son of Marlena
      - Louis McQueen Jr., son of Louis
    - Unnamed McQueen
      - Jennifique McQueen
  - Marguerite McQueen (deceased), daughter of Queenie
    - Victor McQueen, son of Marguerite, married Sarah, married Joan (deceased)
      - Bart McQueen (deceased), son of Victor and Sarah
    - Breda McQueen (deceased), daughter of Marguerite, married Vinnie (deceased)
      - Sylver McQueen (deceased), son of Wes (deceased) and Harriet, adopted by Breda, married to Mercedes McQueen
        - Cher Winters, daughter of Sylver
      - Goldie McQueen, daughter of Breda and Vinnie
        - Prince McQueen, son of Goldie and Shane Sweeney, married Lily Drinkwell (deceased)
          - Theo Anderson, son of Prince and Zoe Anderson
        - Hunter McQueen, son of Goldie and Shane Sweeney
    - Valene McQueen, daughter of Marguerite
    - Unnamed McQueen, son of Marguerite

== Reception ==
Introduced by Bryan Kirkwood, the McQueen family has proved popular with fans, being nominated individually for various awards. At the British Soap Awards, Gemma Merna (Carmel) was nominated for Sexiest Female in 2007. Jennifer Metcalfe (Mercedes) was nominated for the same award in 2007, 2008 and 2009. In 2009, Metcalfe was nominated for Best Actress. Merna also won the award for Best Comedy Performance and was nominated for Best Actress in 2008. James Sutton (John Paul) was nominated for Best Actor and Best Dramatic Performance in 2007. In 2008, Sutton was nominated for Sexiest Male and Best Actor. In 2009, Barry Sloane (Niall) was nominated for Sexiest Male and Villain of the Year. The church explosion, caused by Niall, was nominated for Spectacular Scene. In the 2009 Inside Soap Awards, the McQueens won the award for Best Family.

In late 2008, Kirkwood introduced the cousin of the McQueen sisters, Theresa. It was announced she was to "shake up Hollyoaks". Actress Jorgie Porter stated "I absolutely love the McQueens, I'm so glad I'm in that family! They're dead inviting, and they look after you. They took me under their wing, and they've taught me loads as well." Jorgie Porter was nominated for 'Best Newcomer' in the 2009 British Soap Awards. Hollyoaks producer, Lucy Allan stated that the McQueens are "our favourite family of fun." As part of a Christmas special in 2008, the McQueens appeared together on All Star Family Fortunes, where Nicole Barber-Lane (Myra), Nick Pickard (Tony), Jennifer Metcalfe (Mercedes), Gemma Merna (Carmel) and Claire Cooper (Jacqui) played against the Dingle family from Emmerdale. In 2022, the McQueens were shortlisted for Best Family at the British Soap Awards. That same year, the family was shortlisted for "Best Family" for the 2022 Inside Soap Awards. They were also longlisted for the same award the following year. In 2023, Alex Ross from Planet Radio noted that the family was "still very popular with fans." In 2024, The McQueens were once again longlisted for "Best family at the 2024 Inside Soap Awards.
