= Niall Rafferty =

Fictional character from Hollyoaks

- Hollyoaks character
- Portrayed by: Barry Sloane; Devon Jackson (flashback)
- Duration: 2007–2008
- First appearance: 3 December 2007
- Last appearance: 27 November 2008
- Introduced by: Bryan Kirkwood
- Spin-off appearances: Hollyoaks Later (2008)
In-universe information
- Other names: Matthew Brownlow; Matthew McQueen (birth name)
- Occupation: Hairdresser (2007–2008)
- Family: McQueen
- Father: Martin Brownlow
- Mother: Myra McQueen
- Adoptive father: Mr. Rafferty
- Adoptive mother: Jean Snow
- Half-brothers: John Paul McQueen
- Half-sisters: Jacqui McQueen; Mercedes McQueen; Tina Reilly; Carmel McQueen; Michaela McQueen; Carmina McQueen
- Grandmothers: Marlena McQueen
- Nephews: Max McQueen

Niall Rafferty (born Matthew McQueen) is a fictional character from the British Channel 4 soap opera Hollyoaks, played by Barry Sloane. He first appeared during an episode broadcast on 3 December 2007. Former Brookside actor Sloane was cast as the "mysterious" hairdresser Niall and was introduced by the series' producer Bryan Kirkwood. During Sloane's portrayal of Niall on-screen, he was central to a storyline involving the already-established McQueen family and it was revealed Niall was the illegitimate son of Myra McQueen (Nicole Barber-Lane). The storyline featured Niall seek revenge on the McQueens, which concluded in highly advertised episodes featuring Niall kidnapping his siblings and causing the death of his half-sister Tina Reilly (Leah Hackett). Niall was portrayed by upcoming actor Devon Jackson, the older brother of Hollyoaks actor Kieron Richardson, in flashback scenes depicting Niall's childhood.

Niall's other storylines included his relationship with Steph Cunningham (Carley Stenson). Sloane made his final appearance as Niall during Hollyoaks late-night special series Hollyoaks Later in November 2008. Sloane has been nominated for several awards for his portrayal of the character.

== Creation and development ==
The character of Niall was first announced in November 2007. Kirkwood discussed Niall in an interview with Digital Spy: "A tall stranger who walks into the village — a guy called Niall. He sets himself up as a hair stylist in the salon and he's very ambiguous and mysterious. Viewers will be wondering 'Is he gay? Is he straight? Is he a drugsman?' " He would soon be revealed as, "the big storyline of 2008 — Myra [McQueen]'s secret and abandoned son is back to wreak revenge on each of the McQueens in turn." Niall's backstory was revealed as his storyline continued through 2008. It was revealed he had been given up by a 14-year-old Myra and abandoned at a church a day after the birth. Niall then spent the rest of his childhood in care.

As 2008 progressed, Niall was distracted by his love for Steph Dean (Carley Stenson), but continued to commit a series of violent and manipulative acts against the McQueen family. Barry Sloane said, "When I started, Bryan said to me 'you have to come and see me and say if you feel it's going too far'. We've tried as hard as we can to keep him within the bounds of reality. We know that it has to come to an end eventually. I don't know when that's going to be, but fingers crossed that we can ride the wave as long as possible." Niall was also inadvertently responsible for the death of one of Hollyoaks most iconic characters, Max Cunningham (Matt Littler). Sloane said the scenes were some of the "best material he's done," and that Niall was full of remorse. He also remarked on the irony of Niall attempting to damage the McQueens, but then killing Max completely by accident.

In 2010, Sloane joked that his character could be resurrected after Jamie Lomas' return to the series as his character Warren Fox, despite his death in 2009.

== Storylines ==
Niall arrives as a new hairdresser at beauty salon, Evissa. He helps Evissa owner Louise Summers (Roxanne McKee) and attacks her fiancé Warren Fox (Jamie Lomas), who assumes Niall is mugging her. Niall befriends co-worker Carmel McQueen (Gemma Merna) and her family. Jacqui McQueen (Claire Cooper) is suspicious of Niall, who claims to have two sisters. Niall soon becomes friends with Myra McQueen (Nicole Barber-Lane), who is unaware of his identity, and is invited for Christmas. Overwhelmed, Niall steals a picture from the McQueens and burns it. Niall attempts to become closer to his mother and begins encouraging her to be stricter with her youngest daughter, Michaela McQueen (Hollie-Jay Bowes). Niall gets Michaela drunk at a party and injects her with heroin, which causes her to overdose and makes the McQueens believe she is addicted. Niall continues his revenge on the McQueens by ruining their lives in small ways; reporting Myra for benefit fraud, pushing Carmel and boyfriend Calvin Valentine (Ricky Whittle) apart and attacking his grandmother, Nana McQueen (Diane Langton).

Niall grows closer to Steph Dean (Carley Stenson), following her split with boyfriend Max Cunningham (Matt Littler). Niall falls in love with Steph, and is devastated when she and Max get back together and agree to marry. On their wedding day, Niall speeds off in his car, angered that Steph married Max. Unknown to Niall, his car is in the path of Tom Cunningham (Ellis Hollins). Realising Tom is about to be hit, Max pushes him out the way of the car, but is run over and killed himself. Niall feels guilty for causing Max's death and is pushed away by Steph. Niall reveals an affair between John Paul McQueen (James Sutton) and Kieron Hobbs (Jake Hendriks). Niall overhears Tina Reilly (Leah Hackett) telling Jacqui over the phone she wants to give her unborn child up for adoption. Out of anger, Niall pushes Tina down a flight of stairs, which causes her to have to undergo an emergency hysterectomy and give birth to her son Max prematurely. Jamie "Fletch" Fletcher (Sam Darbyshire) witnesses Niall's assault, but due to his drug addiction, Niall convinces everyone that Fletch pushed Tina down the stairs.

Niall convinces Kieron to leave John Paul and the village, to get him out of the way. Niall bonds with John Paul in Kieron's absence, but is annoyed when he returns. Kieron tracks down Myra's long-lost son and discovers Niall's secret. After confronting him, Niall admits the truth, but drugs Kieron's beer. Kieron is killed and Niall uses his phone to text John Paul to make him think Kieron committed suicide. Niall later tries to drug John Paul in the same way, but discovers John Paul switched their drinks. John Paul eventually leaves the village with ex-boyfriend Craig Dean (Guy Burnet). Niall's life begins to go wrong after Steph tells him she cannot love him. Niall decides to begin his plot of revenge. He kidnaps each of the McQueen children, leaving notes for Myra, who becomes suspicious after discovering baby Max with a note which mirrors the one she left with a newborn Niall. Niall then confronts Jack Osborne (Jimmy McKenna) after learning he was the police officer who arrested Niall's biological father, who died in prison. Niall tells Jack the truth and attacks him. Myra tracks her children down to the same church she left Niall in, and is shocked when Niall reveals the truth. Niall tells her she has to answer six questions, and for each she gets wrong, one of her children will be killed. Myra gets two questions correct and is forced to choose between her children. Tina and Michaela are allowed to live. However, Jack, Darren Osborne (Ashley Taylor Dawson), Tony Hutchinson (Nick Pickard) and Dominic Reilly (John Pickard) arrive to save the McQueens. Realising his plan may be stopped, Niall detonates explosives and the church explodes. In the wreckage, the floor collapses and Niall finds Myra caught under rubble and attempts to free her with help from John Paul. She explains if Niall had told the truth, she would have accepted him. Feeling guilty, Niall pushes Myra out the way as more rubble falls. As the McQueens escape the church, Tina dies from her injuries. As an ambulance drives away, Niall's reflection appears in the window, revealing him to have survived. The McQueens believe Niall is dead. However, the police tell them that Niall's body was never recovered and that he is still alive.

Niall arrives back in the village, with the McQueens no longer his target. He follows Steph and Tom to Scotland, where Craig takes them for a break. In the hills, Niall spies on Steph and after a day of waiting, kidnaps Tom. Niall reveals himself and tells Steph he wants to talk. Niall traps Steph on a cliff edge and fights with Craig, who he attempts to kill. However, Craig makes Niall look at a terrified Steph. Realising everything he has done, Niall says goodbye to Steph and falls backwards over the cliff. Several days later, the McQueens are told of Niall's death, but agree not to mourn him.

In December 2012, a newborn baby boy is abandoned on the McQueens' doorstep on Christmas Day. After learning that the baby is John Paul's son, he names his son in honour of Niall, but by his real name, Matthew.

== Reception ==
At the 2008 National Television Awards, Barry Sloane was nominated for the award of 'Most Popular Newcomer' along with three characters from other soaps; Sloane did not win the award for his role as Niall. He was also nominated in the British Soap Awards for 'Sexiest Male' in 2009 and 'Villain of the Year' in 2008 and 2009. In 2009, the church explosion received a nomination for 'Most Spectacular Scene'. In 2009, Virgin Media named Niall as one of British soap's top ten villain in a feature in which he came ninth. Adam Beresford from Digital Spy noted that whilst the character only appeared for a short stint, he made a "huge impact by terrorising his entire family, killing his sister Tina and then dying in a proper cliffhanger".
