= Myra McQueen =

Fictional character from Hollyoaks

- Hollyoaks character
- Portrayed by: Nicole Barber-Lane
- Duration: 2006–2019, 2024–present
- First appearance: 12 June 2006
- Introduced by: Bryan Kirkwood (2006); Hannah Cheers and Angelo Abela (2024)
- Spin-off appearances: Hollyoaks Later (2011)
In-universe information
- Occupation: Cleaner (2006–2013); Florist (2012–2013)
- Family: McQueen
- Father: Reggie
- Mother: Marlena McQueen
- Half-brothers: Louis McQueen
- Half-sisters: Kathleen McQueen; Reenie McQueen
- Sons: Niall Rafferty; John Paul McQueen
- Daughters: Jacqui McQueen; Mercedes McQueen; Tina Reilly; Carmel McQueen; Michaela McQueen; Carmina McQueen
- Grandsons: Max McQueen; Bobby Costello; Matthew McQueen; Gabriel McQueen
- Granddaughters: Maria-Carmella McQueen; Maria-Gabriella Fox-McQueen; Phoebe McQueen (adoptive)
- Grandmothers: Queenie McQueen
- Nieces: Theresa McQueen; Jennifique McQueen; Porsche McQueen; Celine McQueen; Cleo McQueen
- First cousins: Breda McQueen; Victor McQueen; Valene McQueen
- Other relatives: Bart McQueen; Kathleen-Angel McQueen; Goldie McQueen; Prince McQueen; Hunter McQueen

Myra McQueen is a fictional character from the British Channel 4 soap opera Hollyoaks, played by Nicole Barber-Lane. She made her first screen appearance during episode 1796, originally broadcast on 12 June 2006 and was introduced by producer Bryan Kirkwood as part of the McQueen family. The character is initially designed to play a supporting role in her family's stories. She is characterised as a no-nonsense matriarch who is "fiercely protective" of her family and puts her children first. Myra has a series of failed relationship, leading to her many children. One of her early stories introduces Niall Rafferty (Barry Sloane), Myra's abandoned son who returns for revenge on his mother. The story concludes in a stunt when Niall explodes a church, killing Myra's daughter Tina Reilly (Leah Hackett). Barber-Lane left the soap in 2013 and Myra fakes her death after being shot.

Having made a brief return in January 2014, the character was reintroduced in September 2014 as part of ongoing family stories. Barber-Lane took a break in early 2015, returning in October 2015. Writers created a love interest for Myra in the form of Diego Salvador Martinez Hernandez De La Cruz (Juan Pablo Yepez). Their relationship was used to provide lighter, comedic stories and counterbalance the show's darker plots. It was then challenged through cheating accusations and Diego's family, before ending when Diego cheats. As part of the story, Myra becomes pregnant with her eighth child.

In 2016, producers explored the character's backstory through the introduction of Sally St. Claire (Annie Wallace), a trans woman who fathered Myra's son, John Paul McQueen (James Sutton), before her transition. Initially portrayed as feuding, the pair develop a friendship before being romantically paired together. Writers also used the character as part of a comedic friendship with Marnie Nightingale (Lysette Anthony), which won an award. Barber-Lane departed the cast again in 2019 and Myra leaves following the breakdown of her relationship with Sally. Barber-Lane returned for a guest stint in January 2024, before returning for intermittent appearances from December 2024. The character has received a positive response from viewers and critics alike.

== Casting and creation ==
In 2006, executive producer Bryan Kirkwood created Myra McQueen as the matriarch of the McQueen family, who were described as Kirkwood's "brainchild". Actress Nicole Barber-Lane was cast in the role and she was initially informed that the character was a middle class beauty therapist and business owner with a mechanic husband and multiple children. The character was reimagined as a "rough" single mother to multiple children with writers drawing inspiration from reality television star Lizzy Bardsley. Barber-Lane learnt this on her first day when she visited the costume department.

Hollyoaks' executive producer Lucy Allan said that Myra is not central to storylines as she is not central to the show. She explained that Myra plays a very important role as the mother in the McQueen household, but that she would find it "abnormal" to run a storyline from Myra's perspective. After Barber-Lane lost weight she was asked to put on weight by producers as she "didn't look like Myra any more".

== Character development ==
=== Characterisation ===
Meet Myra McQueen, the mummy bear of Hollyoaks. Enjoying domestic chaos, she's fiercely protective of her family (even when they're in the wrong) and keeps them in line with a mixture of love, understanding and bacon sarnies – all three of which have been in great demand during her Hollyoaks reign, which spans divorce, murder, adultery and a long lost (and very angry about it) son!

— An excerpt from Myra's profile on the official Hollyoaks website.

Myra is characterised as the protective matriarch of the McQueen family who cares deeply about each family member. A journalist from the Hollyoaks website wrote that Myra possesses scepticism, scathing remarks and relentless double standards. They described Myra as the "queen of the McQueen clan", saying she is the "mediator of squabbling kids, harbourer of stray relatives, she is the rock which grounds the feral McQueen family through turmoils and tragedies galore". They continued that Myra has a "feisty, no-nonsense nature" before saying that "with her trademark gold chains and sovereigns, we'd put our money on Myra over Mr. T any day". Myra is portrayed as a loyal Catholic, something she shares with her daughter Carmel McQueen (Gemma Merna). Her backstory states that she has had many failed relationships, resulting in several children. Myra is a single mother and raised all of her children alone. Hollyoaks' international broadcaster, BBC America, noted that this provided the character with "a survival instinct that she's instilled in her children." They described Myra as "loud, sexually free and ready to attack to protect the ones she loves", which was reflected in the characterisation of her eldest children, Jacqui McQueen (Claire Cooper) and Mercedes McQueen (Jennifer Metcalfe). On Myra's parenting technique, Barber-Lane said: "I think like many mothers, she tries her best. Whether her best is up to scratch is another question. She's certainly a very lenient parent, but also she would do anything for her kids, that comes before anything else". Cooper thought that although Jacqui often adopts a maternal approach in the McQueen family, Myra is always "the boss" in the family. She added that both characters possess a "matriarch feel" and if the family had to face a big problem, then Myra would be the one to deal with it rather than Jacqui. Barber-Lane related to Myra personally as a mother, dubbing her a "lioness and protector".

In addition to darker material, the character was written comedically. The Hollyoaks website recognised that Myra is "always first on her feet for a good night out and a spot of karaoke". Barber-Lane enjoyed the comic material and found it different to some of her earlier material. She described her character's personality saying: "She can be quite serious, she can be selfish, she can be loving and giving, she can be ridiculously stupid and she can be amazingly clever - all at the same time! What a woman!" Further comic material was devised for Myra in 2011 through the introduction of the Savage family as Myra develops a relationship with Dirk Savage (David Kennedy).

The character has had numerous failed relationships in her life with the fathers of her children, Martin, Billy, Marvin and Ricky. Barber-Lane described Myra's relationships stating: "She's always fallen for the bad guy, the ones that aren't good for her. They're the ones who give her a challenge along with a bit of fun and excitement. She always believes in true love, though. That's why she constantly gets hurt". Barber-Lane went on to express her interest in introducing one of the fathers of her children, saying: "I'd love for one of the kids' dads to come back, I really would. We've seen one of them already [...] but there was no interaction with Myra".

Myra has had different styles throughout her tenure. When she first joined the show, the costume department dressed her in a ribbed vest top, heavy jewellery and double denim. Myra often dresses younger than she is, opting to wear clothes that do not suit her and are too tight. Barber-Lane called it "another level of casual chic". In 2015, the costume department redesigned Myra's style to reflect her relationship with younger man Diego Salvador Martinez Hernandez De La Cruz (Juan Pablo Yepez). She was dressed in rah-rah skirts, blonde hair extensions and Crocs, which she wears with socks to avoid her toenails being caught. Barber-Lane described the skirts and hair extensions as "horrendous but hilarious!"

=== Niall's revenge ===
In 2007, Kirkwood announced that a "tall stranger", Niall Rafferty (Barry Sloane), would soon join the serial and "the McQueen family take him into their bosom – Myra's to be precise". He explained that the character is Myra's son who she was forced to give up when she was young. Kirkwood added that the storyline would be "the big storyline" of the year as Niall "wreaks revenge" on the family. During the storyline Myra's children begin to disappear making her "panic" upon the realisation. Barber-Lane told Kris Green of entertainment website Digital Spy that Myra no longer wants to look for her son as "she thinks that she's a bad omen. All the bad things that have happened to her, she believes, happened because she gave her son away. However, by trying to find her son, she's being punished in different ways with her other kids. The Catholic guilt kicks in and she feels that it's all her fault. She decides that if she tries to find her son, she'll take him away from the white picket fence and the lovely life that she's created for him in her head. As far as she's concerned, she thinks that he's in a beautiful home, with a lovely mum and dad that are probably lawyers or doctors. That's why she really believes that she did the right thing giving him up when she was young".

Niall lures Myra to the church she left Niall at when she abandoned him at. Niall "stuns" Myra by grabbing her and showing her the step she abandoned him on as a baby. Myra is "completely confused" by Niall's actions but "it slowly starts to dawn on her, especially when she sees the rest of her family in the church". Barber-Lane explained that Niall decides to play one last game with the family and tells that he is "going to wipe them out". Niall decides that he will ask Myra questions and for every one of his questions that Myra answers correctly she can choose one of her children to live. Barber-Lane added that it is "really traumatic" experience for Myra. Myra answers all but two questions correctly and must choose out of her six children which two can live. Myra is told that if she fails to make a decision all of her children will die. Barber-Lane commented that for "a mother, that's such a ridiculously difficult decision. She does choose, though - that's something that comes back to haunt her". Myra chooses Jacqui and Carmel to die, when Mercedes and John-Paul (James Sutton) volunteer to die. The church exploded and Tina (Leah Hackett) is killed. Barber-Lane explained that Myra "can't forgive herself" for choosing Jacqui and Carmel to die. She added that the family dynamics changed when Myra made this choice. Barber-Lane said that Jacqui is less responsive to Myra and she became stronger than Myra who is "constantly riddled with guilt". She concluded that Myra now lets her children "get away with a lot more things than they usually would" because of her guilt.

=== Family ===
On her time on the serial Myra has often become involved in her family member's storylines. In one storyline Bart McQueen (Jonny Clarke) steals money from Myra. Bart lies about stealing the money when he is accused by Jacqui. This causes tensions between Jacqui and Myra who has "had enough of Jacqui muscling in". On her characters reasons for not believing Jacqui, Barber-Lane explained that "When Myra stopped believing Jacqui, I think it was also partly because Jacqui had hid all the stuff about Theresa (Jorgie Porter) killing Calvin (Ricky Whittle) and it was Myra's way of saying, 'Listen - this is my house, my rules'. Maybe she was wrong, but Bart's 15 so she felt that she couldn't kick him out as he had nowhere else to go, and she just thought that Jacqui should behave herself!" Jacqui is later raped by Gilly Roach (Anthony Quinlan). Barber-Lane explained that there is a "part of Myra that thought, 'You'd never let that happen - how have you let that happen? Have you just changed your mind afterwards?" Mercedes lies she is pregnant to cover up her affair with Carl Costello (Paul Opacic), the father of her fiancé Riley Costello (Rob Norbury). Myra discovers her lies and believes that Mercedes should not tell the truth as Mercedes has "landed on her feet" with Riley. Barber-Lane told Daniel Kilkelly of Digital Spy that Myra believes Riley will benefit the McQueen family financially and take them out of the poverty they are in. Myra is getting "carried away" with excitement and enthusiasm over how her life could change due to Riley. She said that the most important thing for Myra is what is important for her daughters although "sometimes she may forget that for a moment, but she's always there for her kids". Myra's mother, Nana McQueen (Diane Langton), was introduced in 2007. Barber-Lane told Johnathon Hughes from Inside Soap that Myra lets her mother "be the boss" whenever she is there as she enjoys "being a child".

=== First departure and return ===
Barber-Lane quit the series in 2013 to seek other job opportunities and spend time with her family. On her departure, the actress commented, "The job is fantastic, I love playing Myra. Over the last seven years we have had some great adventures with her and the McQueens." Myra's exit story features her being shot by her son-in-law Doctor Browning (Joseph Thompson). A show spokesperson explained that as the head of one of Hollyoaks' "most iconic families", Myra deserves the "best send-off possible". They teased, "It's going to be an epic week of episodes that we are sure fans are going to love." Having been shot by Browning, Myra decides to fake her death and emigrate to Spain, leaving her family to believe that she is dead. Barber-Lane admitted that while she was pleased with her exit, she was surprised by how grand it was. She revealed that multiple exit scenes were filmed.

In January 2014, it was confirmed that a former character connected to the McQueen family would return that same month. Myra was confirmed as the returnee during the episode's advanced broadcast on 30 January. Barber-Lane reprised the role for a single episode and her return was kept secret until transmission. In the narrative, Nana McQueen (Diane Langton) arranges for the family to see Myra at the local church where nobody will find her. Writers played on Myra's characterisation by having her support her family in her appearance. In particular, she realises that something is wrong with John Paul, who was recently raped.

=== Reintroduction and break ===
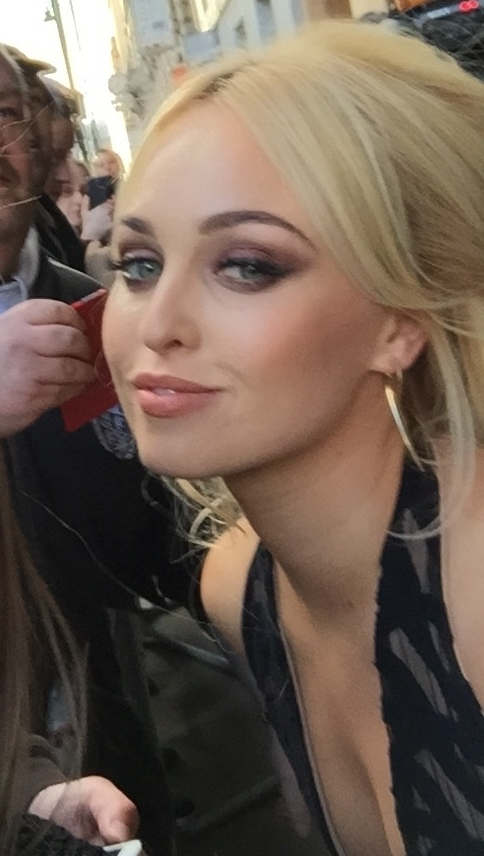
Myra returns with Theresa McQueen (Jorgie Porter, pictured).

Katy Finbow of Digital Spy reported on 6 July 2014 that Barber-Lane had reprised the role on a permanent basis. Myra returns alongside Theresa McQueen (Jorgie Porter), who had left the show months prior. Barber-Lane expressed her joy at returning to Hollyoaks, despite her initial decision to leave. She likened the soap to "a comfortable sofa that you never really want to leave". The character's return first aired in September 2014 when she helps Theresa escape prison custody. Upon her return, the character's hair is dyed blonde and she wears heavy fake tan. Despite initial plans to return to Spain, Myra decides to stay after learning that John Paul was raped. Barber-Lane explained that although she tries being "strong" for John Paul, "she is utterly devastated". She added that she could not leave again because "John Paul's her boy" and she needs to support him.

In 2015, Barber-Lane took a break from the serial. A show spokesperson declined to discuss the contracts of Barber-Lane and Porter, but commented, "Theresa and her aunt Myra do come and go from Hollyoaks village". The actress explained that a return was always planned as Kirkwood promised not to remove her from the opening titles. Myra's adoptive granddaughter, Phoebe McQueen (Mandip Gill), is killed off during her break and viewers criticised her absence from the story. In reality, Barber-Lane was unavailable to film the story, but admitted that she should have returned and feels guilty about not.

The character's return from her break was announced on 3 October 2015. Kirkwood contacted Barber-Lane and asked her to return from her break, explaining that he wanted Myra to become involved in "some quite heavy and serious material as well as the comedy", something which appealed to the actress. Kirkwood told an Inside Soap reporter that Myra would "sprinkle her magic dust on the McQueens and bring that unique warmth and comedy to the show again". Myra returns to support Mercedes when she has a stillbirth amongst a series of other family disasters requiring her matriarchal spirit. Barber-Lane noted that although Nana is still in the village, it is Myra that is needed now for her family. Myra returns in time for the funeral of Mercedes' son, Gabriel. Mercedes realises that she is unhappy with the funeral service and walks out the church, finding Myra waiting for her when she does.

One of the family's stories explores the issue of child sexual abuse. In the narrative, Myra's niece Cleo McQueen (Nadine Mulkerrin) is being abused by her stepfather Pete Buchanan (Kai Owen), who also abused Cleo's older sister Porsche McQueen (Twinnie-Lee Moore) as a child. On Myra's perspective in the story, Barber-Lane explained that Myra believes everything is ok because Pete has been part of the family for "a really long time" as the partner of Myra's sister Reenie McQueen (Zöe Lucker). The actress noted that when Myra discovers the truth, she "won't take it lying down". She believed that as well as supporting her family, she would confront Nana about her involvement. Myra and Reenie's relationship is also explored when she returns. Their backstory states that Myra was not there to support Reenie as a child; she works to fix this upon her return. Barber-Lane pointed out that Myra cares most about her family, commenting, "It's irrelevant what any of them do - she'll always be there for them."

=== Relationship with Diego ===
In 2015, the story team created a love interest for Myra in the form of Diego Salvador Martinez Hernandez De La Cruz (Juan Pablo Yepez). Kirkwood used Myra and Diego's relationship to create some fun and light in the show, counterbalancing the ongoing darker stories with the rest of the family. Barber-Lane was pleased about this and hoped they would remind viewers about the family's fun side. On the pair's relationship, the actress commented, "Myra and Diego will have wicked highs but some lows too. There will be a rollercoaster ride - so expect anything!" Kirkwood thought that the relationship was "one of the loveliest things I've seen in a long time", despite its comic value on the surface.

Myra and Diego met in a bar in Alicante, where she has claimed that she is the Countess of Chester. Diego was attracted to Myra instantly and Yepez believed that there was "an immediate magnetism" between the pair and "it was fireworks from there". Barber-Lane told Kilkelly (Digital Spy) that the characters are actually in love and share an instant chemistry. She added that Diego had "brought something to life" in Myra. When she returns, Myra tries to maintain "her new-found youth, attraction and the magic that she feels with Diego". There is also an age gap between the characters, which makes John Paul and Mercedes suspicious of Diego's intentions. Kirkwood defended Myra, opining, "Myra's a good-looking woman and has a lot to offer". Barber-Lane thought that the age gap made Myra "[feel] like she's 18 again".

Writers immediately tested Myra and Diego's relationship by having him discover her lie. Barber-Lane explained that Myra fears that Diego will not be interested in her anymore because in Spain, "she's living that fantasy out and she doesn't want that to come crashing down". Despite Myra's concerns, Diego is committed to her and forgives her for lying. Yepez observed that since Myra has accepted him for himself, he has done the same for her. Myra becomes concerned that when in the village, Diego may become attracted to other women. Barber-Lane said that Myra wants to trust Diego and admitted that she would be disappointed if writers split up the characters. She warned that if a McQueen sought Diego's attention, Myra would "have to slap them".

The characters' relationship has been tested on multiple occasions when they each suspect the other of cheating. On the first instance, Myra questions whether Diego is cheating on her after finding a photo of Diego and another woman and hearing him telling another woman that he loves her. She confronts him, but he reveals that he was speaking to his sister, Maria. In another scenario, writers had Diego concerned that Myra is cheating with his boss Nathan Nightingale (Jared Garfield). After Diego refuses to teach Nathan Spanish, Myra agrees to in secret. Nathan's sister, Ellie Nightingale (Sophie Porley), learns about their plan and lies to Diego that they are having an affair. Her claim is further supported when Diego spots the pair acting intimately and then witnesses Nathan showing Myra the lingerie he has bought for his girlfriend, Rachel Hardy (Jennifer Brooke). Diego then warns Rachel before preparing to leave the village. Before he leaves, Myra convinces him that she has not been unfaithful.

=== Eighth pregnancy and Diego's family ===
A new story was created for Myra and Diego when Diego decides he wants to start a family. After being hospitalised following a fall, Myra learns that she is pregnant, delighting the pair. The health implications of having a child later in life were explored as part of the story. The pregnancy was marred with challenges. The first being the introduction of Diego's sister Maria (Fernanda Dinez) who wants Diego help smuggling drugs. When Myra discovers the situation, she becomes stressed and is soon rushed to hospital with stomach pains. Although it is a false alarm, Myra's niece, nurse Celine McQueen (Sarah George), warns her to avoid any more stress. They continue with the drug dealing in secret and Mercedes becomes involved, however, Maria sets her up for the dealing. Myra learns about the drug dealing and ends the relationship. Wanting to reunite with Myra, Diego records a confession from Maria about the drug dealing; this frees Mercedes and reunites the couple.

The casting team hired Jacey Sallés to play Diego's millionaire mother Juanita Salvador Martinez Hernandez De La Cruz in September 2016. Juanita arrives to assess Myra's suitability for her son as she has promised him "a large sum of money" for finding an appropriate match. A show spokesperson told Amy Duncan from the Metro that Myra wants a reconciliation between Diego and Juanita so they can have her money. Juanita's introduction plays a role in one of Myra's scams. After deciding that she would not be a suitable match for Diego in Juanita's eyes, Myra enlists Celine to act as Diego's fiancée. George explained that Myra and the family place "a lot of pressure" on Celine to go through with the scheme, even though she does not think it is right. After a change of heart, Myra stops the wedding and Juanita leaves, furious about Diego's relationship. A further twist was included in the episode when four women arrived in the church to claim that Diego is actually a conman.

The couple later split up, but this is tested when Myra gives birth to a daughter, Carmina McQueen. After her waters break at Celine's funeral, she is taken to hospital. After seeing Carmina, she is reminded of Diego and when he arrives at the hospital, they decide to reunite. Hollyoaks used Myra's pregnancy to pay tribute to singer Beyoncé's photo announcement that she was expecting twins. The show's promotion team created a set-up mirroring Beyonce's photo with Barber-Lane using a fake baby bump. On the tribute, the actress commented, "Me and Bey – blessed to be bump buddies."

In March 2017, Yepez was written out of the cast. Having tried to con Frankie Osborne (Helen Pearson), Diego makes plans to move to Spain with Myra and their daughter Carmina. However, when Myra learns that Diego had sex with Frankie as part of the con, she ends their relationship. He decides to leave without an argument, leaving Myra to raise their daughter alone.

=== John Paul's parentage ===
Annie Wallace was introduced as Sally St. Claire, the new headteacher of Hollyoaks High, in October 2015. A Hollyoaks publicist teased that Sally arrives in the village "with an ulterior motive". This motive was revealed in an episode first broadcast in March 2016: Sally, who is transgender, is the father of John Paul, who is also a teacher at the school. The secret is revealed to the audience when Myra first interacts with Sally and recognises her. The story is a first for British soap operas and Wallace thought that Hollyoaks was "trailblazing the way". The show worked with the equal rights group All About Trans to ensure the story could be believable and Wallace dismissed claims that the story was "too outlandish". She opined that it is not uncommon for trans people to have children from before their transition, but agreed that it uncommon for the scenario to involve a headteacher and one of her employees. The show's story team made the story a character-led story and Wallace pointed out that the story focuses on "family, history and character". Wallace enjoyed working with Barber-Lane and Sutton on the story.

Myra is "horrified" to see Sally again. Barber-Lane pointed out that Myra is surprised to see Sally again and then doubly surprised to learn she is now a trans woman. She told Charlotte Tutton from OK! that Sally's arrival has brought "back memories and upset for Myra". Myra worries about the impact the truth could have on her relationship with John Paul. She demands that Sally keep the truth a secret and stays away from John Paul. Wallace explained that Myra is "protecting herself from the lies that she's told over the years", rather than protecting John Paul. Myra's backstory with Sally is explored in the episode after the reveal. Wallace praised the writing of the episode and found it emotional to film. She also believed that the episode would quash the idea that the story is "outlandish". Barber-Lane confirmed that Myra and the McQueens would eventually accept Sally into the family. She commented, "If fans know anything about the McQueens, it may take them a while but their hearts are always in the right place." As Myra comes to accept Sally, their former friendship is touched upon, which Wallace enjoyed. She later told Duncan Lindsay from the Metro that she wanted the pair to become best friends again and suggested that they should "go in the village and get drunk and reminisce and just be friends again".

In April 2016, it was reported that another villager, followed by John Paul, would learn about his parentage. A show spokesperson stated that John Paul would learn the truth in "hugely emotional" scenes, placing Myra and John Paul's relationship in jeopardy in the process. After seeing John Paul being attacked, Sally rushes in and reveals that he is her son. Wallace explained that in that moment, Sally stops thinking about Myra and her job and is only thinking about John Paul. John Paul reacts badly to the truth and struggles to forgive Myra for lying to him. Wallace thought that Myra and Sally cannot say anything to prevent him being in "a real emotional turmoil".

In another scenario, Myra and Sally have an argument at the school which leads to Myra falling down the stairs. It is not revealed whether Myra fell or whether Sally pushed her, leading both characters and the audience to question. John Paul believes that Myra has fallen to claim compensation, which creates tension between him and the rest of his family. Wallace explained that John Paul sees Myra as "the compensation queen of Chester" so thinks her plan has just gone wrong. Myra only suffers minor injuries as a result of the fall. Writers ended the feuding between Myra and Sally after John Paul is involved in a car accident and temporarily loses his vision. Barber-Lane explained that Myra is "completely devastated" and wants to care for John Paul as he is "the golden boy" of her children. In the aftermath, Sally tries to support John Paul too, which Myra finds uncomfortable. Barber-Lane pointed out that the pair have to "change their way of thinking and their relationship" and work together to support their son.

=== Friendship with Marnie Nightingale ===
Producers paired Myra with Marnie Nightingale (Lysette Anthony) in a friendship in 2017. Anthony felt that the pair "really understand each other" and thought the only difference between them was their education. The actress really enjoyed working with Barber-Lane and hoped that producers would give them their own series. The friendship forms when Myra invites Marnie to stay at her house after she becomes homeless. Anthony pointed out that Marnie initially struggles in the house as she finds it an "utter squalor". She added that it is "snob hell for Marnie". Marnie soon settles at the house but the McQueens grow tired of her and try to find a way for her to leave. They involve her in a karaoke night where everyone wears a onesie. Anthony told Alison Gardner from What to Watch that Marnie finds the outfit horrifying, especially when Myra reveals she has never washed it. In a 2025 interview, Barber-Lane named Marnie as Myra's closest friend and called them "kindred spirits". She commented, "Marnie was always trying to be better, but Myra felt superior as she was comfortable with herself and didn't take Marnie too seriously."

=== Relationship with Sally St. Claire ===
Over multiple months, a potential romance between Myra and Sally was teased as the former remained confused on her sexuality. On many occasions, Myra avoids confronting her feelings and pushes Sally away. Wallace liked the idea of two former lovers reuniting and beginning a modern relationship. Writers agreed and developed a romantic relationship between the pair in February 2018. Wallace confirmed that although the romance would become serious, it would be tested at various points. She felt that the plot was "an important and groundbreaking storyline". She added that it is "a story of love [and] of soul-mates", rather than a sexual relationship. The development occurs after Sally decides to move out, having become disheartened by Myra's rejections. Following Bart's funeral, Myra reflects on mortality and decides she wants a "meaningful" relationship with Sally. The pair have sex, but the next morning, Myra hides the development from the family, making Sally believe that Myra is rejecting her again. Realising this, Myra makes a public declaration of love for Sally in The Dog in the Pond pub.

Following Barber-Lane's decision to leave the show again, Myra was written out in March 2019. Her final storyline sees her relationship with Sally end after Myra cheats on Sally before their wedding. Sally offers to leave the village, but Myra claims to need to sort out her daughters in Alicante so departs. Barber-Lane expressed her sadness at leaving, but opined that she "[needed] to do something different for [her]". She explained that during her second stint, she enjoyed Myra and Sally's relationship as well as Myra's friendship with Marnie. In a video uploaded to the show's Instagram, Barber-Lane thanked viewers for "taking Myra to [their] hearts". She also teased that the character could return again in the future.

=== Returns (2024) ===
Barber-Lane reprised the role in 2024 for a guest stint as part of a new period for the show. Myra returns alongside Cleo and Theresa in episode 6287, broadcast on 16 January 2024. Their return features in a major stunt involving multiple characters and was embargoed until transmission, creating a surprise for the audience. The actress was excited to reprise her role and pleased with the secrecy of her return. She was unsure whether she would return again and thought it would depend on the reaction to this stint and scheduling conflicts. Hannah Cheers, the show's co-executive producer, felt "very passionate" about the character's return and called it "a really gorgeous moment". She commented, "Myra is back in the bosom of the McQueen family and hopefully that's a surprise for the audience to see in the episode."

Barber-Lane was invited to return upon the appointment of new executive producers Cheers and Angelo Abela. She had learnt about Cheers' hiring and felt excited for the show's future. Barber-Lane met with Mulkerrin and they discussed a return to Hollyoaks. The actress did not think that it would be possible with her schedule, but when Cheers contacted her agent, they were able to arrange for it to happen. Barber-Lane agreed to return if producers could arrange a return for Jacqui too. She opined that "it'd be a really big thing to have Jacqui and Myra back in the show". Although schedules for Barber-Lane and Cooper were unable to align for filming together, producers were able to secure a short return for Cooper. Writers then devised a "cohesive" story linking Myra and Jacqui's returns. Barber-Lane told Kilkelly (Digital Spy) that there would be hints towards the linked story, but no explicit explanation.

Following this return, producers decided to reintroduce Myra to the series in short stints, which suited Barber-Lane. Her next return airs in December 2024, with Nana McQueen, as part of the show's Christmas stories. Writers tied the returns in with the departure of Theresa as Porter took maternity leave. Barber-Lane was excited to work with her on-screen family again. She commented, "It's great because we know the McQueens can go from slapstick silliness to serious heart-wrenching drama." The stint marked Langton's final television appearance before her death in January 2025. Myra returns again in March 2025 for a longer stint to support Mercedes who has cancer. Barber-Lane was pleased to stay for a longer stint and was excited for her emotional scenes with Mercedes. The costume department revised Myra's style in this stint and she was given a new mode of transport. The character was also given scenes opposite Oscar Curtis, who portrays Lucas Hay, which Barber-Lane described as "fun".

== Storylines ==
Myra starts a casual relationship with Leo Valentine (Brian Bovell), she then discovers she has caught pubic lice from him. Tina and Russ Owen (Stuart Manning) both catch them after sharing her towel. This causes issues with their respective partners Dominic Reilly (John Pickard) and Mercedes until Myra admits she introduced them. Myra spends New Year's Eve 2007 with Leo, they become drunk and engage in sexual activity. Leo's ex-girlfriend, Valerie Holden (Jacqueline Leonard/Samantha Giles) becomes jealous and attempts to ruin their romance. Myra's son, Niall arrives in the village. She gave him up at birth and he lies about his identity. It soon becomes apparent that he is after revenge on the McQueens. Myra disapproves of Tina acting as a surrogate for Jacqui and Tony Hutchinson (Nick Pickard). She begs her not to make the same mistake she made in giving her child away. Niall causes trouble for Myra's family by reporting Myra for benefit fraud, injecting Myra's daughter, Michaela (Hollie-Jay Bowes), with heroin, pushing Tina down the stairs and attacking Myra's mother, Marlena "Nana" McQueen (Diane Langton).

Myra makes a friend in priest Kieron Hobbs (Jake Hendriks), who comes to stay with her. They become good friends and Myra is hurt to discover Kieron has a secret relationship with her son, John Paul. She asks Kieron to track down Matthew, the son she gave up. Kieron manages to find his adoptive mother and is shocked to learn it is Niall. When he confronts Niall, he drugs him and kills him to stop him from revealing his identity.

Niall kidnaps all of the McQueens and takes them to the church where Myra abandoned him. He lures Myra to the church and reveals the truth. He then asks Myra six questions. For every right answer one of her children lives and for every wrong answer one dies. She only answers two questions right and has to choose which two of her six children gets to live. Mercedes and John Paul sacrifice themselves leaving Myra to choose among the rest. She chooses Tina and Michaela, meaning Carmel and Jacqui have to die. When help arrives, Niall detonates the explosives he has rigged the church with. Jacqui refuses to help Myra out of the rubble. Niall saves her after she tells him that she always loved and thought about him. Myra is devastated to discover Tina has died in the explosion and that Niall has (supposedly) committed suicide. Afterwards, Jacqui cannot forgive her for her actions, but Carmel does.

Myra's niece, Theresa moves in with her. She then develops an unwelcome crush on Mike Barnes (Tony Hirst) and later sleeps with Archie Carpenter (Stephen Beard). When her sister Kathleen McQueen (Alison Burrows) arrives comes to see Theresa, Myra lets her stay for Theresa's sake. Kathleen uses Tina's old credit cards for money, when Myra finds out she forces Theresa to choose between her mum and relatives, Theresa chooses her relatives. Theresa shoots Calvin dead. The rest of the family keep it a secret from Myra, when she eventually discovers the truth she is hurt that no one told her. Myra's cousin Victor agrees to let his son Bart live with Myra, after his wife dies. Myra saves the life of Alistair Longford (Terence Harvey), a rich pensioner. He assumes Cindy Cunningham (Stephanie Waring) has saved him and gives her money. Cindy becomes engaged to him, so Myra and Jacqui blackmail her for money and the role of her wedding planners. The money is later stolen and Jacqui accuses Bart. Myra defends him and Jacqui tells Myra she will move out if she doesn't believe her. She sides with Bart and loses Jacqui.

Myra agrees to let the Savage family live with them after they squat in her home. She becomes close to Dirk Savage (David Kennedy) and the pair have a casual relationship. When Mercedes becomes engaged to footballer Riley she immediately takes a liking to his rich background, to the dismay of his mother Heidi Costello (Kim Tiddy) who Myra feuds with over the wedding. Myra discovers Mercedes' affair with Riley's father, Carl. She keeps the affair secret and helps Mercedes continue to lie when she pretends she is pregnant. When Riley causes Mercedes to fall, Myra lies that Mercedes is having a miscarriage. Mercedes discovers she is really pregnant and Myra joins Mercedes and Michaela in Ibiza for her hen party.

On the day of Mercedes' wedding to Riley, Myra walks Mercedes down the aisle. At the altar, Mercedes confesses after feeling guilty that she had a four-month affair with Riley's father Carl, and that she isn't sure if the baby she is carrying is his or Riley's. Riley doesn't marry Mercedes and ends their relationship, disgusted that she would cheat on him. Mercedes tells everyone that she needs some time to clear her head, and therefore she plans to travel to Dubai on their honeymoon alone. Mercedes is kidnapped by serial killer Silas Blissett (Jeff Rawle). Silas texts Myra pretending to be Mercedes saying she is fine. Myra becomes concerned when Mercedes fails to contact her, but is reassured by Theresa who tells her that Mercedes will call when she is feeling better. Silas is arrested and Mercedes' ring is found amongst the possessions of his victims. Myra is stunned when it is revealed that Silas, who kidnapped Mercedes when she was seven-months pregnant, murdered Heidi. Myra is upset at Mercedes' ordeal. As a result, she begins to show Mercedes how much she loves her by helping her out with her newborn son, Bobby McQueen.

Bart begins growing cannabis for Joel Dexter (Andrew Still). The police discover this and Bart runs away. Realising Bart could have a career if he did not have a criminal record Myra claims the drugs are hers. Myra is sent to prison for 6 months. Mercedes visits Myra who warns her not to do anything stupid when she realises Mercedes could hurt Mitzeee (Rachel Shenton). Myra disowns Mercedes after she uncovers that Mercedes stabbed herself and has been released. Mercedes' ex-lover Dr. Paul Browning (Joseph Thompson) returns following being released from prison, found innocent of the murder of Lynsey Nolan (Karen Hassan), and reunites with her, later getting engaged. Doctor Browning fakes Myra's medical tests, in order that she might reconcile her relationship with Mercedes, and she becomes under the impression that she is dying. Doctor Browning accidentally puts a medical record under Myra's name which states she is pregnant. When Mercedes sees this, she tells Dirk that Myra is pregnant with his baby. Dirk then proposes to Myra, only for Myra to admit that she is terminally ill and not pregnant. Myra later agrees to marry Dirk, and takes out a loan of several thousand pounds for the wedding. Doctor Browning later informs her that she has no "shadow". Myra decides she wants to sue the hospital, so that she might pay back her loan, but Jim McGinn (Dan Tetsell) later tells her that it is not a case worth pursuing. When Jacqui finds out about Myra's debt, the McQueens decide to gather money together, but to little avail. The bailiffs arrive at the McQueens' and strip the house of furniture and other items.

Doctor Browning starts to get anonymous text messages from someone claiming to know he murdered Lynsey. He thinks that Myra has been sending these messages. It is later revealed that it was Jim who was sending the messages, still unknown to Doctor Browning. Thinking she had sent them, he attacked her in the florist's where she worked. Myra survived the attack, but she now starts a hate campaign on Doctor Browning by throwing fliers around the whole village labelling him a murderer. Doctor Browning decides to hire Trevor Royle (Greg Wood) to kill her. Myra still survives, and now knowing that someone is out to kill her, she decides to flee Chester. Jim arranges a boat to get her away from those trying to kill her. However, as she was waiting at the docks, Doctor Browning showed up with a gun, and after a heated argument, Myra was shot and fell into the water. She was presumed dead, until John Paul follows Jim to the airport, where it was revealed she was wearing a bullet proof vest and is alive, however, she must flee so Doctor Browning will be locked away for the crime. John Paul promises to keep their encounter a secret and watches on as Myra leaves forever. Myra makes a brief return, reuniting herself with the rest of the McQueens. She reveals that she is now living with Jacqui in Spain and can never return to the village as she would be arrested for faking her death.

In 2014, when Mercedes fills Myra in on what they have discovered about Carmel's fiancée, Sonny Valentine (Aaron Fontaine), Myra hatches a plan to make Carmel realise what he is like. Myra is devastated when John Paul tells her he was raped by Finn O'Connor (Keith Rice), and vows to help him through it. When Nana and Mercedes tell Myra to go back to Spain, she tells them that her family need her, and she is not going anywhere until the McQueens are safe. Myra later visits Trevor, who threatens her. She visits The Hutch to see John Paul who had got engaged to Ste Hay (Kieron Richardson) who wants her blessing, and she runs into Frankie Osborne (Helen Pearson), and food falls onto Frankie. Myra doesn't want to be seen by Frankie who then spots her. She makes a quick escape, and later gives Ste her blessing for him to marry John Paul. Myra, Phoebe and Mercedes hatch a plan to get rid of Sonny for good, and they force him into a car with a toy gun. They park the car by a lake, and as Myra, Phoebe and Mercedes discuss what their next plan is, Myra realises that she has left the handbrake on and the trio watch helplessly as the car and Sonny roll into the water. They confess all to Carmel, who is furious and contemplates telling the police. Myra, Phoebe and Mercedes manage to convince Carmel against the idea, but when they go to pay their respects to Sonny at the lake, they look on in horror as the police are pulling the car out of the water. Carmel later reveals to Mercedes, Myra and Phoebe that Sonny was not found in the car, and he is now a missing person. During Finn's trial, Myra becomes enemies with Finn's stepmother Diane O'Connor (Alex Fletcher), after Myra discovers that Diane is intending to lie for Finn in court. When Diane is later attacked in The Hutch, she believes it was one of the McQueens after an argument with Myra, but it was in fact Ste who was robbing the restaurant for money. When is transpires that Ste robbed The Hutch and attacked Diane to buy drugs, Myra is disgusted and tries to keep Ste away from John Paul, but Ste convinces Myra to allow him to speak to John Paul. Myra finds out that Diane's stepdaughter Sinead O'Connor (Stephanie Davis) had been having an affair with Tony. Myra wants Diane to suffer and vows to make her find out. John Paul takes the camera which had recorded Sinead and Tony to Diane. John Paul returns a few minutes later and smashes the camera. Myra then helps Carmel to get Phoebe's mobile phone to the police which holds a confession that Sonny had said to the McQueen's in order to free Theresa from prison. Theresa is later freed and she goes into labour. Myra then helps Theresa to hospital and helps her give birth to Myra-Pocahontas Savage-McQueen.

The McQueens discover that Carmel is planning to abduct Kathleen Angel with Sonny whilst attending Myra's niece Porsche McQueen's (Twinnie-Lee Moore) wedding to newcomer Lockie Campbell (Nick Rhys). They disown her, and Myra is disgusted in her daughter. Sonny sneaks aboard the train and attacks Phoebe and Theresa, before Sienna Blake's (Anna Passey) car on the tracks causes it to derail. Carmel frees Theresa from Sonny's clutches in the wreckage just before it explodes, and Myra and the rest of the McQueens are devastated when Carmel dies due to injuries sustained in the explosion. Myra clashes with Mercedes in the aftermath of Carmel's death, due to Mercedes believing Theresa ruined Carmel's life and Myra disagreeing. Myra picks Theresa over Mercedes, and Mercedes is left out on the streets whilst the rest of the family grieve for Carmel. Mercedes shows up drunk at Carmel's funeral and starts bringing up incidents from the past where the family hurt Carmel, when Mercedes starts to insult Carmel Myra tells Mercedes that she's done nothing but bring shame on the family and that it should be her in Carmel's coffin, Mercedes storms out in distress. Later that night, Mercedes is supposedly "murdered" by an unknown assailant. The next day, Phoebe calls the police concerned about Mercedes whereabouts and when the police detective notices blood on the kitchen floor the house is turns into a crime scene and a murder investigation is launched. Myra starts to fall into a depression after the death of Carmel and apparent death of Mercedes. She was later shocked that John Paul was engagement with Ste, which makes her angry and never wanted him to get married with him, and afraid that it will be like Mercedes late husband Paul Browning. Several weeks later, she decides to go to Alicante to see Jacqui and attempt to work through her pain and weeks later is joined by Nana.

Myra returns in November 2015, after Theresa informs her about the stillbirth of Mercedes' son, Gabriel. Mercedes apologises to Myra for faking her death, and Myra forgives her. She is also reunited with her youngest sister Reenie (Zöe Lucker), who she is close to. The day after her return, a young Venezuelan man named Diego Salvador Martinez Hernandez De La Cruz (Juan Pablo Yepez) arrives in Hollyoaks searching for the "Countess of Chester". It transpires that he is Myra's boyfriend, after lying to him that she is the ruler of Chester and is 38 years of age. The pair reconcile and he moves in with the McQueens. She is disgusted to learn that Reenie's husband Pete Buchanan (Kai Owen) has been sexually abusing her teenage niece Cleo McQueen (Nadine Rose Mulkerrin), and comforts Reenie when she reveals that she too was repeatedly raped as a child by Nana's abusive ex-partner, Derek Clough (Bruce Montague). In March 2016, Myra is furious to learn that John Paul's transgender boss, Sally St. Claire (Annie Wallace), has sacked him, so behind his back she confronts her. However, she recognises Sally as her ex-boyfriend, Iain Naismith, who is also John Paul's father. She is adamant not to allow Sally to reveal her identity to John Paul, and after a heated argument, Sally agrees that it is for the best not to say anything. When the truth comes out during a showdown with Pete, John Paul refuses to speak to Myra or Sally. However, he slowly warms to Sally when he finds and reads a letter from her which should have been given to him when he was a child, and becomes more hostile towards Myra for withholding it. She later demands that Sally pay for all the years of child maintenance that she missed out on for John Paul, which Sally agrees to but Myra storms off. When Sally catches up with her, she attacks Sally, which results in Myra falling down the stairs at the school. She is rushed to hospital, and it transpires that Sally pushed Myra down the stairs in self-defence. Celine McQueen (Sarah George) then breaks the news to Myra that she is pregnant with Diego's baby. Myra later gives birth to a girl called Carmina Celeste, named after her late daughters Tina and Carmel and her niece Celine, who was recently murdered.

== Reception ==
At the 2009 Inside Soap Awards the McQueens won "Best Family". Barber-Lane was nominated in the "Funniest Female" category at the Inside Soap Awards in 2012, 2016, and 2017. At the 2017 ceremony, she won the Best Partnership award for her on-screen partnership with Lysette Anthony. Barber-Lane was nominated at the British Soap Awards for Best Comedy Performance in 2018, and 2025. Barber-Lane was longlisted for Best Comic Performance at the 2025 Inside Soap Awards. In a poll run by Hollyoaks' official website to discover the best mum out of Myra, Diane O'Connor (Alex Fletcher) and Martha Kane (Carli Norris), Myra came second receiving over 3450 votes, over 45% of the total votes.

Kris Green, of Digital Spy, felt that Myra was a "shining star" in the Hollyoaks' flashfoward episode saying that although Myra does not have a lot to say in the episode her "shimmying and witty quip" about other characters makes up for it. Inside Soap critic Laura-Jayne Taylor said she had grown to love "faithful mum Myra". Taylor's colleague, Sarah said she is unsure who her favourite member of the McQueen family is as she is torn between "the bumbling leadership of McQueen matriarch Myra" and other members. Elaine McCluskey from What to Watch listed Myra at number four in a ranking of the most dramatic McQueens. She called Myra "a truly unlucky soap matriarch". Rianne Houghton, also from Digital Spy, hoped that Myra and Sally's relationship would be successful, commenting, "Please let this be a happy ending, Hollyoaks! [...] Sally and Myra, we're rooting for you!"
