= Fred Longworth High School =

Location
- Printshop Lane; Tyldesley; Manchester, Greater Manchester, M29 8JN; England; 53.51378°N 2.4786°W

Information
- Type: Academy
- Motto: Facta Non Verba
- Established: 7 March 1964
- Founder: Sir Fred Longworth
- Local authority: Wigan Council
- Department for Education URN: 137448 Tables
- Ofsted: Reports
- Headteacher: Paul Davies
- Gender: Coeducational
- Age: 11 to 16
- Language: English
- Colours: Gold, red & black
- Website: https://flhs.org.uk/

Fred Longworth High School is a coeducational secondary school with academy status located in Tyldesley in the English county of Greater Manchester.

It was established as a girls' school by Lancashire County Council in 1964. The school became comprehensive in 1976 and was awarded Arts College status in 1998. Previously a community school administered by Wigan Metropolitan Borough Council, Fred Longworth High School converted to academy status on 1 September 2011. However the school continues to coordinate with Wigan Metropolitan Borough Council for admissions.

Fred Longworth High School offers GCSEs and BTECs as programmes of study for pupils. As well as for use for pupils, some of the school facilities are also available for hire to the local community.

== Redevelopment ==
Starting in 2021, the school underwent a £3.3 million reconstruction project for the Mathematics and Humanities block. Once construction was completed, the old Mathematics and Humanities block was demolished. The old area was transformed into an open space after being torn down, and the new block is three floors tall, able to hold around 20 classrooms and available space for office or staff facilities.

In April 2022, redevelopment of the remaining areas of the school began, and encompassed a large section of unused fields adjacent to Hinsford CE Primary School, where it was then completed in August 2023. As of May 2024, all construction work on the main building has been completed and the school has now moved its facilities into the new area; the old building has been standing until further notice, with little to no noticeable demolition taking place, but is no longer occupied. Once demolition of the old school is completed, the free space will be turned into football fields and multi-use game areas. A sports pitch is to be re-provided by Spring 2025, where work is due to be fully complete.

Though the rest of the school will be demolished, the currently standing Art block will remain as part of the new build, along with the newly constructed Mathematics and Humanities block, including small facilities at the back of the school, such as the ping-pong room and Inclusion Centre, which are expected to be turned into staff office space.

== Notable former pupils ==
- Leah Hackett former Hollyoaks actress.
- Anthony Quinlan* former Hollyoaks and Emmerdale actor.
- Keely Hodgkinson, athlete. Won a silver medal for Athletics at the 2020 Summer Olympics in Tokyo. She then won Gold at the 2024 Paris Olympic Games.
- Ella Toone, footballer. Plays for Manchester United W.F.C and played for England in the UEFA Women's Euro 2022.
