= Tina Reilly =

Fictional character from Hollyoaks

- Hollyoaks character
- Portrayed by: Leah Hackett
- Duration: 2006–2008, 2026
- First appearance: 3 August 2006
- Last appearance: 18 February 2026
- Introduced by: Bryan Kirkwood (2006, 2014); Hannah Cheers (2026)
In-universe information
- Occupation: Careers advisor
- Family: McQueen
- Father: Marvin Bassman
- Mother: Myra McQueen
- Half-brothers: Niall Rafferty; John Paul McQueen
- Half-sisters: Jacqui McQueen; Mercedes McQueen; Carmel McQueen; Michaela McQueen; Carmina McQueen
- Husband: Dominic Reilly (2007–2008)
- Sons: Max McQueen
- Grandmothers: Nana McQueen
- Aunts: Kathleen McQueen; Reenie McQueen
- Nephews: Bobby Costello; Matthew McQueen
- Nieces: Phoebe McQueen (adoptive)
- First cousins: Theresa McQueen; Porsche McQueen; Celine McQueen; Cleo McQueen
- Other relatives: Bart McQueen; Goldie McQueen; Breda McQueen; Prince McQueen; Hunter McQueen

Tina Reilly (also McQueen) is a fictional character from the British Channel 4 soap opera Hollyoaks, played by Leah Hackett. Since making her first appearance in August 2006 as part of the McQueen family, Tina has been involved in storylines including sexual harassment and surrogacy. Tina was killed off in a church explosion on 17 October 2008, shortly after Hackett decided to leave the serial. On 19 January 2026 it was announced that Hackett would reprise her role as part of her John Paul McQueen’s exit storyline. Tina returned for a one-off special on 18 February 2026.

== Character creation ==
The character of Tina was introduced in August 2006 as one of the McQueen sisters. During 2008, it was announced that one of the McQueens would be killed off in a church explosion, caused by secret McQueen Niall Rafferty (Barry Sloane). The exact details of which character would be killed were due to be kept secret until the episodes aired, however, Hackett revealed she had quit the soap early in 2008 days before her character was killed.

A spokesperson for Hollyoaks commented on the storyline, "Sadly, one of the girls decided they had had enough and told producers that they wanted out. So what better way than to be blown up in one of the most shocking plotlines of the autumn? Regardless of who it is, fans are going to be gutted, as the McQueen sisters are some of the most popular characters on the show. All that can be revealed at the moment is that there is plenty of blood and a huge explosion. And one of the McQueen clan is murdered."

== Storylines ==
=== Backstory ===
Tina was born to Myra McQueen (Nicole Barber-Lane) following a one-night stand with a bingo caller called Marvin. Myra fell in love with Marvin, but after telling him she was pregnant with Tina, he gave her money to abort the child. Myra, however, did not use the money for an abortion and told Marvin she was keeping the baby. After this, Myra never heard from him again. She then gave birth to Tina, who she named after Tina Turner. In order to make Tina believe her father cared for her, Myra sent her birthday cards from Marvin every year, until Tina discovered the truth.

=== 2006–2008 ===
Tina meets Dominic Reilly (John Pickard). They soon discover that they both share interests in reading and a passive demeanour. Following many failed dates, Tina and Dom finally kiss and lose their virginity to each other. Tina's sisters Carmel (Gemma Merna) and Michaela McQueen (Hollie-Jay Bowes) overhear Dom calling Tina "Cathy", a character from her favourite play Wuthering Heights, and assume he is having an affair with Kathy Barnes (Sarah Jane Buckley). Michaela and Carmel decide to expose Dom's apparent affair, but end up finding Dom and Tina sleeping together. Dom proposes to Tina, and they begin to plan their wedding. However, Tina and Dom discover their planned wedding clashes with Tina's sister Mercedes McQueen (Jennifer Metcalfe) and fiancé Russ Owen (Stuart Manning), so Myra suggests they have a double wedding and Mercedes and Tina reluctantly agree. During their joint hen night, Tina and Mercedes, along with Carmel and Jacqui McQueen (Claire Cooper), find an unconscious Clare Cunningham (Gemma Bissix), after she is pushed from a balcony. On the wedding day, Louise Summers (Roxanne McKee) interrupts the ceremony claiming Mercedes slept with Warren Fox (Jamie Lomas) on the night Clare was pushed, Mercedes being his only alibi after his arrest for attempted murder. In order for the wedding not to be ruined, Tina tells Russ that Mercedes was with her all night. After marrying Dom, Tina tells Mercedes she will never forgive her for spoiling her wedding day. Due to lack of privacy at the McQueen house, Tina and Dom move in with Jacqui and her boyfriend, also Dom's brother, Tony Hutchinson (Nick Pickard).

Tina begins working as a careers advisor at Hollyoaks High school. Tina's boss Pete Webster (Richard Cambridge) begins to sexually harass Tina, later playing mind games when she rejects his advances. Tina tries to tell Dom about Pete's harassment but he does not listen and befriends Pete. After finishing work one night, Pete tries to rape Tina but Russ stops him. Dom later takes Pete's side when Tina tells him what happened so she and Russ have a one-night stand for comfort, and the next day, Tina tells Dom that their marriage is over.

Tina agrees to be a surrogate for Jacqui and Tony who cannot have children. Myra and Mercedes are not happy with the plan and try to convince her not to go through with being inseminated with Tony's sperm. However, Tina insists but Dom is also unhappy, but the pair reconcile and he agrees to stand by Tina, who is overjoyed to discover she is pregnant. However, she discovers at her 12-week scan that the foetus is 15 weeks and therefore must have been conceived when she slept with Russ. Tina confesses her affair to Jacqui, who is furious, but tells her to keep it a secret or both their relationships will be over. A heavily pregnant Tina confides in Niall Rafferty (Barry Sloane), telling him she is considering putting her child up for adoption, unaware Niall is her half-brother who Myra put up for adoption. Tina tells Jacqui her adoption plans during a phone-call. An angry Niall then pushes Tina down a flight of steps, and tells the McQueens he saw Jamie "Fletch" Fletcher (Sam Darbyshire) push her. Tina is rushed to hospital and has a baby son that she names Max. Due to injuries sustained in her fall, Tina has an emergency hysterectomy, rendering her unable to have any more children. Jacqui and Tony want to raise Max, but Tina decides to keep him. The truth about Max's paternity is revealed, making Dom and Tina split up. In order to make Max's life as normal as possible, Tina and Russ agree to move in together. However, Tina does not love Russ and soon moves out. As she does, Niall kidnaps her and ties her up in an abandoned church with her sisters. Niall leaves Myra a note from Tina, similar to one she left with him as a baby, so she goes looking for her daughters. When she arrives at the church, Niall makes Myra choose which two children will live, telling her that he will kill the rest. Myra chooses Tina, because of Max, and Michaela, because she is the youngest. Dom, Tony, Jack Osborne (Jimmy McKenna) and Darren Osborne (Ashley Taylor Dawson) enter the church to save the McQueens from Niall, who detonates explosives. All the McQueens survive and begin to exit the church in the aftermath of the explosion but return when they learn that Niall is holding John Paul McQueen (James Sutton) hostage. The floor collapses and Tina is trapped under the rubble. Dom holds Tina, who is fatally wounded. Tina tells Dom how much she loves him before dying. Dom carries Tina's lifeless body out of the church to the devastated McQueens.
