= Nicole Barber-Lane =

British actress, active 2005–

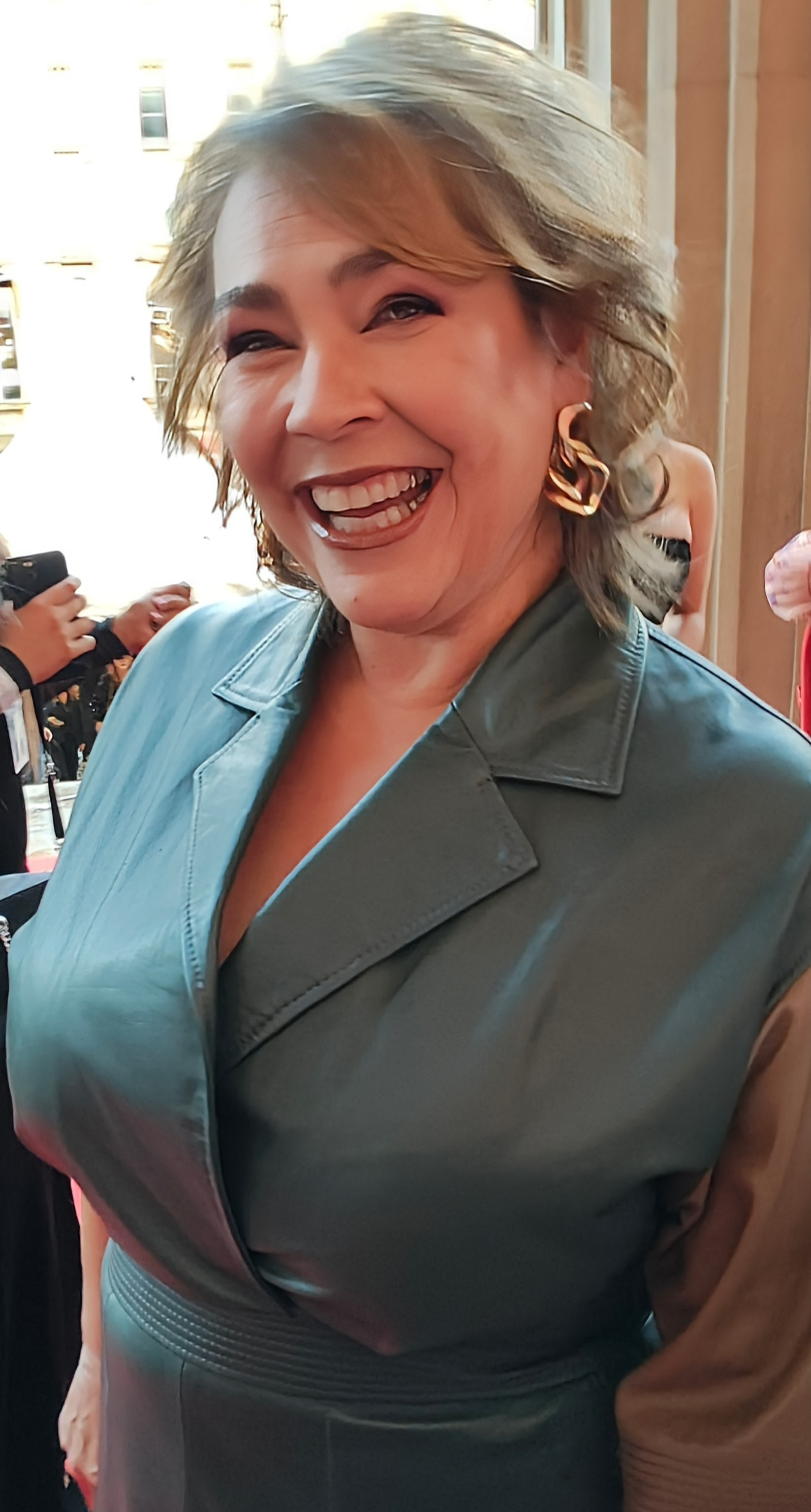
- Barber-Lane in 2025
- Born: England, United Kingdom
- Occupation: Actress
- Years active: 1998–present
- Known for: Role of Myra McQueen in Hollyoaks (2006–2019, 2024–)
- Spouse: Liam Fox (m. 1999; div. 2015)
- Children: 2

Nicole Barber-Lane is an English actress. She is best known for playing Myra McQueen in the Channel 4 soap opera Hollyoaks (2006–2019, 2024–present).

== Career ==
Before working in Hollyoaks, Barber-Lane appeared in Emmerdale, Bodies, The Cops, and in a Yorkshire Building Society commercial. She has featured in Woman, Red and NOW magazines. Barber-Lane has also appeared in theatres such as The Dance House Theatre, The Courtyard Theatre and The Robert Powell Theatre. She has also performed at the Bridgewater Hall in Manchester.

She is also one of the many celebrities who have teamed up with Cancer Research UK to cover Cyndi Lauper's "Girls Just Want to Have Fun". On 27 March 2019, Barber-Lane left Hollyoaks after thirteen years on the show when her character Myra moved to Spain. On 15 January 2024, Barber-Lane returned to Hollyoaks for a guest stint.

In 2023, she appeared as Susie in Shane Meadows' period drama The Gallows Pole. Later that year, she played Liz Ford in an episode of the BBC soap opera Doctors.

== Personal life ==
Lane married actor Liam Fox in 1999. They have two children together. In February 2015, they announced that they were to divorce.

== Filmography ==
Title	Year	Role	Notes
2005	Emmerdale	Nurse	Episode: #1.4176
2005	Hollyoaks	Nurse Phillips	Episode: #1.1636
2005	Bodies	Alex Blair	Series 2: Episode 10
2005	Hollyoaks: Let Loose	Nurse	Guest role
2006–2019, 2024–present	Hollyoaks	Myra McQueen	Regular role; 886 episodes
2010	Race for Life: Girls Just Want to Have Fun	Unknown	Short film
2011	Being Sold	Simone Hoyle	Feature film
2011	Hollyoaks Later	Myra McQueen	5 episodes
2019	MyBad!	Elaine Campbell	Television film
2022	What Would Julie Do?	Gronya Remba	Short film
2023	The Gallows Pole	Susie	Main role; 3 episodes
2023	Coronation Street	Ange	2 episodes
2023	Doctors	Liz Ford	Episode: "BFF"
