= Leah Hackett =

English actress (b. 1985)

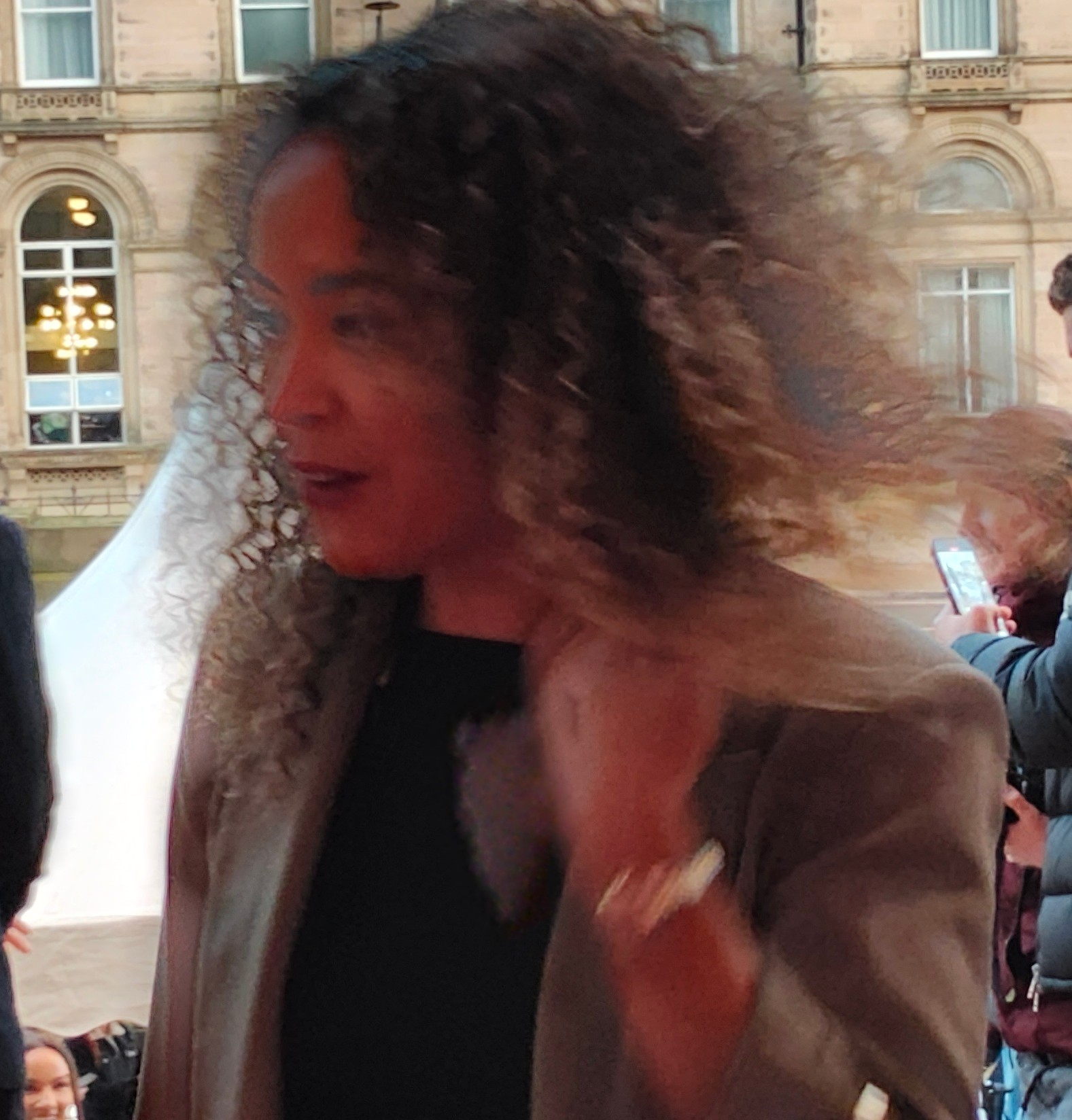
- Hackett in 2025
- Born: 15 August 1985 (age 41); Bolton, Greater Manchester, England
- Education: Winstanley College; Liverpool Institute for Performing Arts
- Occupation: Actress
- Years active: 2006–present
- Known for: Role of Tina Reilly in Hollyoaks
- Children: 1

Leah Hackett (born 15 August 1985) is an English actress, best known for her role as Tina Reilly in the British soap opera Hollyoaks.

== Early life ==
Hackett was born in Bolton, Greater Manchester into a mixed race family, with an English mother and an African-American father. She worked in Tyldesley Library as a teenager. She attended Tyldesley Primary School before moving to Fred Longworth High School. She later attended Winstanley College and went on to get a place at Liverpool Institute for Performing Arts.

She appeared in Reemer's video for the single Maniac.

== Personal life ==
Hackett co-owns clothing rental boutique The Closet in Liverpool with Hollyoaks co-stars Jennifer Metcalfe and Claire Cooper.

== Career ==
Hackett played timid Tina Reilly in Channel 4 soap Hollyoaks. She played the role for over two years between 3 August 2006 until her character's death on 17 October 2008. She reprised the role for one episode on 20 November 2014. Hackett appeared in the Liverpool Nativity on 16 December 2007 as a shepherdess. In July 2008, Hackett was the face selected to launch the Polaroid PoGo. She also appeared in a series of videos promoting the Year of Food and Farming where she milks a cow, shears sheep, collects eggs and makes ice cream at Blaze Farm in Cheshire. She appeared in a pantomime (Dick Whittington), at Buxton Opera House and she played Alice Witzwarren. She appeared as Clare Saunders in an episode of Doctors, titled "The Mathematics of Marriage", which aired 15 December 2010. In 2018, Hackett appeared in the comedy film Above the Clouds.

== Stage appearances ==
- November 2010, Pub (musical drama), Royal Exchange, Manchester
- June to July 2013, Manchester - The Massacre (a promenade performance drama splicing the Peterloo Massacre of 1819 and the Hacienda Movement of 1989), Library Theatre company

== Filmography ==
=== Television ===
| Year(s) | Title | Role | Notes |
|---|---|---|---|
| 2006–2008, 2026 | Hollyoaks | Tina Reilly | Channel 4 |
| 2010 | Doctors | Clare Saunders | |
| 2011 | The Case | Tamsin Hatfield | |
| 2012 | Doctors | Michaela Everett | |
| 2012 | Good Cop | Laura | |
| 2013–2020 | 4 O'Clock Club | WPC Rowe | Series 2–9 |
| 2014 | Coronation Street | PC Stanley | ITV, 1 episode |
| 2017 | The Break | Lisa | BBC, 1 episode |
| 2018 | Above the Clouds | Comedy film | Daisy |
