= Karen Hassan =

Northern Irish actress (born 1981)

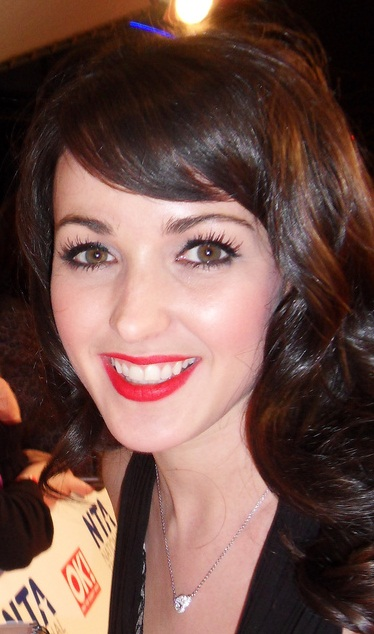
- Hassan in 2009 at the National Television Awards
- Born: 31 July 1981 (age 45); Belfast, Northern Ireland, United Kingdom
- Occupation: Actress
- Years active: 2007–present

Karen Hassan (born 31 July 1981) is a Northern Irish actress from Belfast. From 2010 until 2013, she played Lynsey Nolan in the main series of Hollyoaks. Her other work includes the series Hollyoaks Later, The Fall, and Vikings, as well as the film Hunger. She also appeared in American TV Series FBI: International in 2022. Hassan's most recent role features her playing the leading lady, Alison, in the 2023 British independent film Wait For Me.

== Career ==
The character of Lynsey was created as the former girlfriend of Kris Fisher (Gerard McCarthy) and was intended to feature only in Hollyoaks Later, a spin-off from the Hollyoaks series. In June 2010, it was announced that three new characters; Brendan Brady (Emmett J. Scanlan), Bart McQueen (Jonny Clarke) and Lynsey were to join Hollyoaks in August.

Of the castings, Hollyoaks series producer Paul Marquess said: "This is a really exciting time for Hollyoaks and Brendan, Lynsey and Bart bring more fun, drama and sexiness to the show." Hassan moved from Belfast to Liverpool, where Hollyoaks is filmed, for the role. In an interview with the official Hollyoaks website, Hassan said that she was "dead chuffed" after being told that Lynsey would be appearing in Hollyoaks. Hassan's character was found murdered in a Hollyoaks episode which was broadcast on 29 June 2012. Karen also played DC Jo Lipton in the Northern Irish TV series Hope Street in 2023.

== Filmography ==
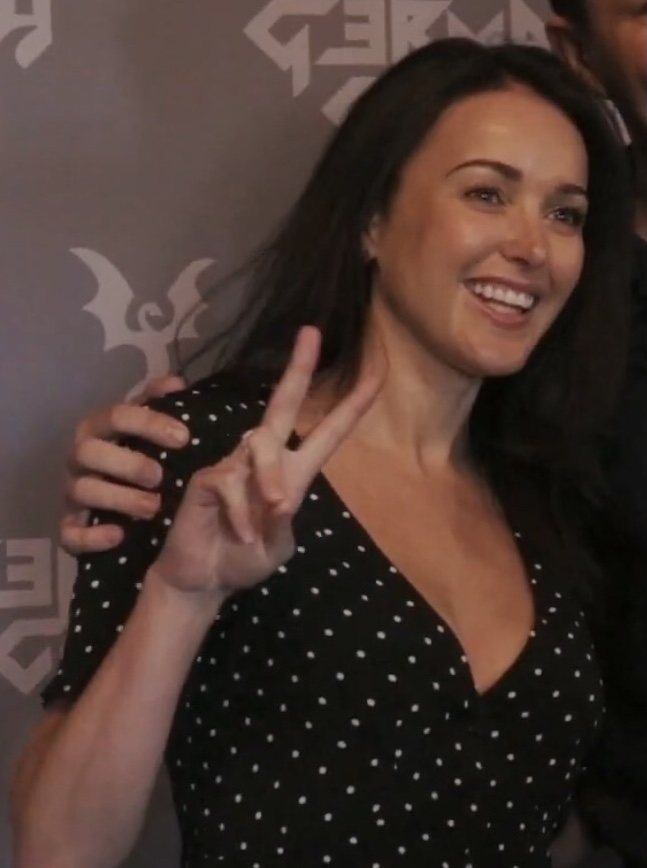
Hassan at the 2019 German Castle Con

=== Movies ===
Film
Year	Title	Role	Notes
2007	Checkout	Checkout Girl	Short film
2008	Master of Reality	Elizabeth Darwin	Short film
2008	Miss Conception	Young Nun	Short film
2008	Hunger	Gerry's Girlfriend	Feature film
2008	Last Man Hanging	Pearl Gamble	TV movie
2009	Fifty Dead Men Walking	Cassie	Feature film
2009	Scapegoat	Patricia Curran	TV movie
2010	Erwin	Prostitute	Short film
2011	Trust Me	Karen	Short film
2014	Loss	Kate	Short film
2015	The Caravan	Becky	Feature film
2023	Wait for Me	Alison	Feature film
2026	Bad Faith		

=== Television ===
Television
Year	Title	Role	Notes
2008, 2010	Hollyoaks Later	Lynsey Nolan	10 episodes
2010–2011	Sketchy with Diarmuid Corr	Various roles	9 episodes
2010–2013	Hollyoaks	Lynsey Nolan	11 August 2010 – 19 July 2013
2012, 2018	Casualty	Nicole Clancy / Abigail Laurence	3 episodes
2013–2014	The Fall	Annie Brawley	Series regular
2015–2016	Vikings	Therese	12 episodes
2016	The Royals	Maid	Guest star
2017	Valentine's again	Amy	TV movie
2018	Soft Border Patrol	Lisa	Main cast
2019	Is This Sexual Harassment?	Catherine Timms	TV documentary
2022	FBI: International	Lauren Walsh	1 episode
2022	Suspicion	Nicola	1 episode
2023–2024	Hope Street	DC Jo Lipton	Series regular
