= Jacqui McQueen =

Fictional character from Hollyoaks

- Hollyoaks character
- Portrayed by: Claire Cooper
- Duration: 2006–2013, 2023
- First appearance: Episode 1873; 26 September 2006
- Last appearance: Episode 6262; 8 December 2023
- Introduced by: Bryan Kirkwood (2006); Hannah Cheers and Angelo Abela (2023)
- Spin-off appearances: Hollyoaks Later (2009); Hollyoaks: King of Hearts (2010)
In-universe information
- Other names: Jacqui Malota; Jacqui Ashworth
- Occupation: Nun; Waitress; Laundrette assistant Tanning consultant Dinnerlady; Barmaid; Cleaner
- Family: McQueen
- Father: Billy Alexander
- Mother: Myra McQueen
- Sisters: Mercedes McQueen
- Half-brothers: Niall Rafferty; John Paul McQueen
- Half-sisters: Tina Reilly; Carmel McQueen; Michaela McQueen; Emily Alexander; Theresa McQueen; Carmina McQueen
- Husband: Aleksander Malota (2007–2008); Rhys Ashworth (2011–2012)
- Adoptive daughters: Phoebe McQueen
- Grandmothers: Marlena McQueen
- Aunts: Kathleen McQueen; Reenie McQueen
- Nephews: Max McQueen; Bobby Costello; Matthew McQueen
- Nieces: Kathleen-Angel McQueen; Myra-Pocahontas Savage-McQueen; Maria-Carmella McQueen; Maria-Gabriella Fox-McQueen
- First cousins: Theresa McQueen; Jennifique McQueen; Porsche McQueen; Celine McQueen; Cleo McQueen
- Other relatives: Bart McQueen; Goldie McQueen; Breda McQueen; Prince McQueen; Hunter McQueen; Sylver McQueen (adoptive); Cher Winters (adoptive)

Jacqui McQueen (also Malota and Ashworth) is a fictional character from the British Channel 4 soap opera Hollyoaks, played by Claire Cooper. She debuted on-screen during the episode airing on 26 September 2006 and was introduced by series producer Bryan Kirkwood as part of the McQueen family. Cooper has stated that whilst Lucy Allan produced the serial she was not used and that Jacqui had "lost her identity". In 2010 when Paul Marquess took over the role, he recognised she was an under used character and split her apart from the McQueen family, subsequently increasing her role within the show. Jacqui has been portrayed as a "tough ex-con" and is extremely feisty, she often takes on the matriarch role within the McQueens.

Many of Jacqui's early storylines revolved around her life of crime, marrying Aleksander Malota (Jon Lolis) to pay off debts and her wayward relationship with Tony Hutchinson (Nick Pickard), which became popular with viewers. One of her most prominent early plots involved her desire to have her own child after a miscarriage left her unable to, this resulted in failed adoption, various surrogate mother stories involving her family and eventually led to the breakdown of her relationship with Tony. Jacqui's later storylines involved her relationship with Des Townsend (Kris Deedigan), covering up Calvin Valentine's (Ricky Whittle) murder, being blackmailed and held at knifepoint for sex and a "surprise relationship" with Rhys Ashworth (Andrew Moss) which also become very popular with audiences. In 2011, Jacqui made a rape accusation against Gilly Roach (Anthony Quinlan), and whether Gilly is guilty or innocent was decided by a jury composed of viewers. The storyline subsequently resulted in Gilly being found not guilty, although it is later revealed that he did rape her. Various critics have praised the character because of her "feisty and tough persona". Others have criticised her "chav" dress sense and accused her of being a "trollop". Cooper has received various award nominations for her portrayal. It was later announced that Cooper had quit Hollyoaks and Jacqui departed Hollyoaks on 26 April 2013. Cooper reprised the role in December 2023 for two episodes.

== Casting ==
In May 2010, Cooper felt that she had been sidelined by former producer Lucy Allan and that Jacqui had lost her identity. New executive producer Paul Marquess also felt that Cooper had been under used. He decided to split Jacqui away from the rest of the McQueens, his reason for which being that there was so much "talent" in terms of acting within the family, he felt Cooper or Jacqui didn't need that "support system". He increased her role in storylines. This made Cooper delighted, of the changes she stated: "he seemed to like what I did and he's worked on it and developed it. Paul has really taken me under his wing, he's worked me so hard and he's given me opportunities that I could only have dreamt of." Speaking of her approach to playing Jacqui, Cooper has said: "I try to tame Claire back because I'm a really emotional, sensitive person and very different from Jacqui, so I do work hard and I feel very privileged."

== Development ==
=== Characterisation ===
Jacqui has been described as tough and hard. Holy Soap refers to her as a "tough ex-con". Jacqui often takes on the matriarch role. Jacqui deals with the sisters in a different way and can get different responses from the sisters. Cooper describes her as always being there to pick up the pieces for her family. She also states that Jacqui is very loyal and the most loyal character out of the McQueen family. Speaking of Jacqui's time away from forefront plots Cooper has said: "I think that Jacqui's one of those characters who, if she isn't on screen for a while, it takes the audience time to warm to her again. But when they do, they find her funny, they find her interesting and I try to give them as much as I can."

Jacqui has never had an affair in the serial, of her morality Cooper states: "It's all about family for Jacqui and she's never cheated on any of her sisters. She's got morals and this isn't good enough." Cooper has also spoke of her confusion of the audiences perception that Jacqui is "a bitch" when she has strong morals. Cooper has said she is proud of Jacqui's wardrobe because it is not glam. She brands her as the complete opposite of the "honey image" the serial sometimes becomes associated with. Describing how she plays Jacqui she states: "It's great playing Jacqui because I can just be completely grotesque and over the top, snarling and grunting."

BBC America describe Jacqui as being the toughest of the McQueen sisters and comment on her thieving ways stating: "She began the McQueens' shoplifting tradition, teaching her younger siblings how to steal while their mother was at work and basically putting stolen goods in Michaela's hands from birth."

=== Relationship with Tony Hutchinson ===
Jacqui's relationship with Tony Hutchinson (Nick Pickard) was often strained by her desire for children. Her sister Tina McQueen (Leah Hackett) agrees to be a surrogate mother for her child. The storyline was included to help house many lies and secrets that had previously been built up prior, including Tony's affair with Mercedes McQueen (Jennifer Metcalfe) and Tina's affair with Russ Owen (Stuart Manning), of which Kirkwood stated there was "there's so much ammunition in store", which would eventually devastate Jacqui. Kirkwood also devised the plot to show of Coopers skills in playing tragedy, of this he commented: "It'll also give Claire Cooper and Nick Pickard another opportunity to show off their acting talents. Tony and Jacqui are one of those couples that we can have fun with - but also will blow the audience away when dealing with tragedy."

In a later storyline Tony announces his intentions to marry Cindy Hutchinson (Stephanie Waring), prompting Jacqui to try to talk Tony out of it. Cooper has stated that she believes that her character is meant to be with Tony because "he is the love of Jacqui's life" and that hearing their engagement makes Jacqui feel like she "has a knife in her back." Cooper also hopes one day that the pair will reunite stating: "Jacqui needs to move on right now, but ultimately I'd prefer the story to come full circle and lead back to Tony." Cooper also revealed that at the time she was often approached by fans asking her when the couple would reconcile. Pickard has also stated he didn't think Cindy was right for him and that he believed Jacqui to be the love of Tony's life.

=== Relationship with Rhys Ashworth ===
In 2010, Jacqui embarked on a "surprise" relationship with Rhys Ashworth (Andrew Moss). Moss first hinted at their romance months prior stating: "I think Rhys is going to fall in love again. It's a character already in the village. It's quite surprising. It's a character who's been here for a while." The relationship proved popular with viewers; during an interview with Digital Spy, Cooper spoke of her original lack of optimism towards the pairing, stating: "When the relationship first started, we didn't know how they were going to gel and how it was going to work, because people were such fans of Jacqui and Tony. Some people still ask me if those two are going to get back together, but people are really taken with Rhys and Jacqui." Cooper believes it's her own working relationship with Moss that helps make the pairing a success stating: "It's a nice collaboration and we try to make it funny, emotional, hard-hitting, three-dimensional and as interesting for the audience as possible." She also adopted a "couple name" for the pair titled "Ja-Rhys".

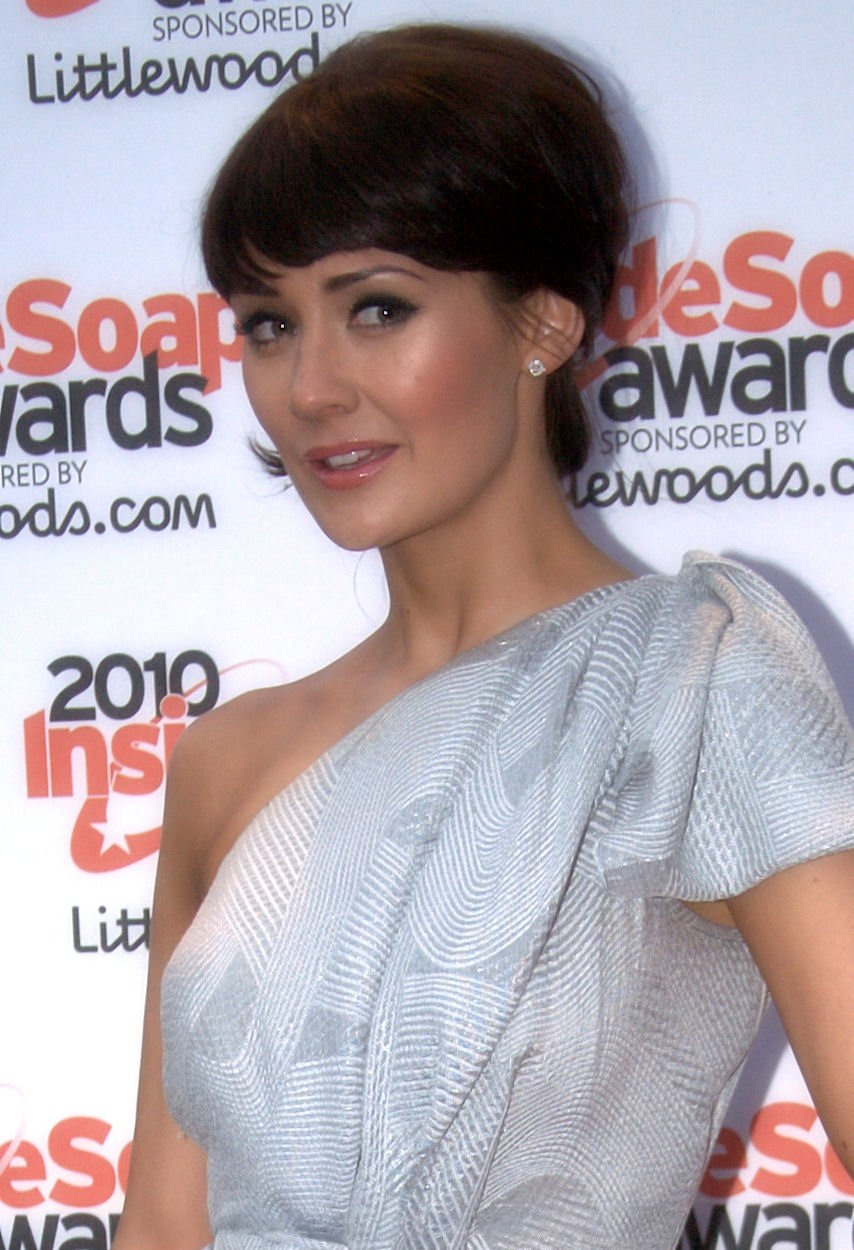
Claire Cooper (pictured) has said that her own rapport with Moss made Jacqui and Rhys' relationship realistic.

Jacqui and Rhys were given the biggest storyline in spring 2011 in the serial, of this Marquess stated: "They have got the biggest story for the first half of 2011. I think it may be one of the biggest stories in Hollyoaks history. It's very, very serious and I think it will really divide the audience. It will really test them and their relationship to the nth degree, and we'll see whether they can recover from it."

=== King of Hearts ===
In September 2010, it was announced that actor Darren Day had been cast as new character Danny Houston, described as a gangster who would "spell trouble for Jacqui". Danny takes a shine to Jacqui and they share a couple of dates; during an interview Day brands Danny's attraction to Danny being down to her feisty manner adding: "Jacqui stands up to him, and even though he's not used to it, I think he likes it. He's quite intrigued by the fact that she's so feisty and he likes that edginess about her."

It was later revealed that a special late night episode had been commissioned which would feature Jacqui. The storyline was described as "sinister" and would involve Danny and returnee Kathleen McQueen (Alison Burrows), as they rig a game of poker with dramatic consequences. Of her involvement in the episode, Cooper said, "I was really chuffed and felt very flattered and privileged to be given the opportunity to do so much."

The storyline involves Kathleen blackmailing the McQueens for money, threatening to reveal their roles in Calvin's murder. Kathleen is described as Jacqui's "worst enemy", with Cooper explaining that Jacqui hates Kathleen "with a passion - her worst enemy ever has been dragged back! It's funny and comedic at times, but then it can get deadly serious." Although she knows the risks of crossing Danny, she tries to fix the poker game; of this Cooper comments that "It's pure desperation" on Jacqui's behalf. When Danny exposes her, he threatens her with Rhys' life, stating if she does not sleep with him, he will kill Rhys. In a turn of events Jacqui turns him down. Cooper defends Jacqui's actions stating that she is a "bright girl" and adding "She doesn't want to sleep with him and also she knows he's not going to drop Rhys in front of so many people. So when he says it, she considers her options, weighs them up."

Jacqui faces more horror from Danny when she is threatened at knifepoint to strip for him; scared for her life, she complies. Speaking of Jacqui's sudden change of heart, Cooper explains, "He pulls out a knife. That changes the situation - the dynamic changes immediately. He could do something really horrible to her - it's not necessarily about killing someone, he could slash her face or anything. In a situation like that, your mind plays tricks as you wonder what someone could do to you." Cooper has spoken of her feelings of responsibility to portray it correctly and stated "I wanted to show how horrendous it was for Jacqui. She wonders whether she could die like this - all to protect her family…"

=== Sexual assault ===
In December 2010, Channel 4 released a press statement which revealed Jacqui and Gilly Roach (Anthony Quinlan) would drunkenly cheat on Rhys together, after she finds out Rhys has slept with Cheryl Brady (Bronagh Waugh) and that the night's events would "change their lives forever". It was later announced that the storyline would see Jacqui accusing Gilly of raping her. The storyline received much coverage in various tabloid newspapers who also branded it as a "shock plot" for the serial. None of the cast members involved in the storyline knew if Jacqui had actually been raped, of this Cooper states: 'They're telling the same story but are looking at it from different angles. Just who to believe is a very grey area. It will split the village and the viewers. We don't know what happened that night, We've just been told that our characters each think they're telling the truth. [Anthony] and I have talked about it a lot. I even read his scripts to try to work it out. The outcome will be a surprise for both of us.'

The storyline began to play out on-screen in February 2011, describing how it starts to develop and the effects it has on Gilly a spokesperson for the serial told Inside Soap: "Jacqui loves Rhys, so she's really hurt when she finds out about his infidelity. Then she runs into Gilly who's also got relationship problems,. The drink starts to flow, and one thing leads to another... Gilly consumed with guilt over sleeping with his best friend's girlfriend, it doesn't help that Jacqui leaves Gilly's place while he's asleep - and runs into Rhys. But after Gilly wakes up, he knows he has to tell his mate what he's done. When Gilly confesses, Rhys is both furious and hurt, and lashes out violently. [...] Once he's confronted Gilly, he demands an explanation from Jacqui - and is stunned when she tells him she was actually raped, it's absolutely devastating." The storyline later takes another turn when Gilly confronts Jacqui in the village with everyone watching, leading everyone to doubt if he did commit the act or not.

It was later revealed that the details were left unclear because Lime Pictures had decided to leave the outcome of the rape trial into viewers. Viewers have been given the chance to apply for the fictional jury, consisting of a cross section of society, including non-Hollyoaks viewers. They will be shown evidence from the case and then decide whether Gilly is guilty or innocent. Chief executive of Lime Pictures, Carolyn Reynolds stated: "We wanted to open up the thorny issue of how hard it is to be a juror and whether the court room the best place to resolve some of these questions about rape." The storyline was developed with the "St Mary's Sexual Assault Referral Centre" and other charities. DCI Ben Snuggs, leader of Don't Cross the Line campaign, explaining: "This storyline represents an issue that we see all too often, involving whether consent is clear on the part of both parties involved in sexual activity, and particularly when alcohol and drugs are involved." Gilly was found not guilty, leaving Jacqui devastated.

Gilly later confessed to the rape, as he recalled that Jacqui had not only not consented, but had removed any perceived consent. Gilly left the village and did not go to the police.

=== Departure ===
On 21 February 2013, it was revealed that Cooper had quit the show and her final scenes would air in April. Cooper said that she had the "most incredible and unforgettable" time and Jacqui had been a "fascinating part to play". She also wanted to explore new roles and concluded that "it's been one hell of a ride for Miss McQueen and an inspirational one for me." A spokesperson added that Jacqui's departure will occur after her involvement with Trudy Ryan (Danniella Westbrook). Cooper filmed her final scenes on 26 February 2013.

=== Brief return ===
On 27 November 2023, it was confirmed that Cooper would reprise her role as Jacqui for one episode. Cooper made her return on 7 December 2023.

== Storylines ==
=== 2006–2013 ===
Jacqui arrives home on a tag after being released from prison and believes Russ Owen (Stuart Manning) is burgling the family home. She hoards money for gangster, Davey, but her half-sister Carmel McQueen (Gemma Merna) steals the money to buy breast implants. Mercedes McQueen (Jennifer Metcalfe) finds the money to repay Davey but there is still not enough so Jacqui promises to do him a favour one day.

Jacqui meets divorcee Tony Hutchinson (Nick Pickard) and an attraction igniting, they have sex. Tony goes away on holiday and starts a relationship with Jacqui on his return. Jacqui violates her prison tag after staying at Tony's house overnight so she is sent back to prison. Sadly, Tony is forced to dump her because he cannot handle the pressure. Jacqui befriends Becca Dean (Ali Bastian) but Becca is later killed by another prisoner and Jacqui is devastated. Jacqui decides to make something of herself, not wanting to waste her life and is reunited with Tony and Davey returns with the favour. He forces Jacqui to marry Aleksander Malota (Jon Lolis). Jacqui and Aleksander manage to convince an immigration officer that their romance is genuine and they are married but Jacqui continues her affair with Tony secretly. The family uncover the truth about the marriage when Carmel and Aleksander's affair is revealed. Jacqui admits she married Aleksander to pay off her debt to Davey and is seeing Tony. Myra McQueen (Nicole Barber-Lane) is furious and orders Jacqui, Aleksander and Carmel to leave the house. Jacqui announces her pregnancy; Tony initially does not want the child, fearing that it may die like his previous child and their dreams are shattered when Jacqui miscarries and is left unable to have children of her own. Tony attacks Aleksander violently as he blames Aleksander as he cannot grieve for his baby publicly. Tony announces to the people in The Dog that the baby was his, not Aleksander and Jacqui asks Aleksander to return to Albania so she can live her life and he agrees. Carmel is shocked to discover Aleksander is leaving, leaving Carmel devastated. Depressed, Jacqui returns to her old habit of shoplifting, so Neville Ashworth (Jim Millea) gets her locked up for the night.

Jacqui accuses Myra of being a bad mother and suggests it would have been better if Myra had aborted her. Jacqui and Tony reconcile again. Jacqui plans to adopt because of her criminal record. Tony discovers he has a secret child called Harry. Jacqui forces Tony to make a choice: Harry or her. Tony chooses Harry and she ends their relationship and leaves. An intoxicated Tony and Mercedes betray Jacqui by sleeping together. Jacqui fails to resist Tony again and they restart their on-off relationship. She then changes her surname back to McQueen from Malota and Mercedes reveals that she is pregnant and Jacqui asks Mercedes to let her and Tony raise the baby, unaware it's Tony's baby but Mercedes has an abortion, infuriating Jacqui so Myra offers to be her surrogate but she refuses. Tina sees how desperate her sister is for a child and offers to be the surrogate, leaving Jacqui and Tony ecstatic about having a future child. At Tina's scan, Tina's pregnancy paternity results uncover Russ Owen (Stuart Manning) is the baby's father, not her boyfriend and Jacqui convinces her to keep quiet. Niall Rafferty (Barry Sloane) attacks Tina upon discovering she is considering adoption. Tina gives birth to a boy, Max McQueen (Brayden Haynes-Mawdsley) naming him after Max Cunningham (Matt Littler) and then has to have an emergency hysterectomy. Tina then decides to keep Max. Niall holds all the McQueens' hostage in a church and when Myra arrives, she soon learns that Niall is her son. Niall says Myra has to choose two children to die and Jacqui tells Mercedes that she cannot watch her die so Mercedes reveals her night of passion with Tony. Myra comes to a tough decision and chooses Jacqui and Carmel to die. Jacqui is devastated and Niall detonates the explosives and blows up the church and Tina dies. Jacqui confronts Mercedes and Tony, only to learn that the baby Mercedes aborted, was in fact Tony's. This pushes her over the edge. She takes Max from Michaela and refuses to forgive Tony, Mercedes or Myra. Jacqui begins to spend Tony's money and does anything to hurt him, even by sleeping with Mark Gascoyne (Craig Russell). Jacqui and Tony separate and she realises she needs to forgive Myra. Jacqui's cousin Theresa McQueen (Jorgie Porter) arrives and has sex with Tony. Jacqui attacks Tony and reports him to the police, but Theresa later retracts her statement.

Russ becomes angry with Jacqui for trying to stop him from seeing Max. Russ later runs off with Max abroad. Carmel confesses to Jacqui that she let Russ walk away with Max. Jacqui is angry and goes to see Tony, who agrees to pay for a private investigator to help find Max. Jacqui leaves for France in order to find Max, but is unsuccessful. She starts a relationship with Des Townsend (Kris Deedigan) but confesses her love to Tony days before his wedding, Tony rejects her. A photographer publishes naked pictures of her after a drunken photoshoot. Jacqui and Des' relationship is strained by Jacqui's naked pictures leaking, her lies and stealing from the school canteen. Mercedes tells Jacqui she is having an affair with Calvin. Jacqui confronts him and steals a gun from Lauren Valentine (Dominique Jackson). Theresa finds the gun and shoots Calvin. Jacqui decides to cover for Theresa. Jacqui tries to frame Gaz Bennett (Joel Goonan), but Kyle Ryder (Neil Toon) is later charged with the murder. Shortly after Des proposes to her, Jacqui discovers that he was a racist from Michaela's boyfriend Zak Ramsey (Kent Riley). Consequently, for Des, Jacqui declines his proposal and he leaves the village after being arrested alongside his sister Rose.

Jacqui, along with Rhys Ashworth (Andrew Moss) then gets a new job at Chez Chez, a new bar that is owned by Cheryl Brady (Bronagh Waugh) and her brother Brendan Brady (Emmett J Scanlan). Jacqui and Rhys unknowingly meet on an internet dating website and fall for each other. Horrified when they find out, they kiss. Jacqui's cousin Bart McQueen (Jonny Clarke) moves into the McQueen household and causes a rift when he steals money from her. This causes Jacqui to move in with Rhys. Jacqui meets gangster Danny Houston (Darren Day) and they begin dating despite her feelings for Rhys. She cheats on Danny with Rhys, leaving Danny furious. Jacqui tells Rhys they need to keep their affair secret. However she ends their relationship as Jacqui catches Cheryl and Rhys having sex. Revengefully, Jacqui gets intoxicated and beds Gilly Roach (Anthony Quinlan). She later tells Rhys that Gilly has sexually assaulted her, reports him to the police and he is charged.

Jacqui and Mercedes' father, William Alexander (Richard Graham), arrives in the village and asks for a kidney transplant. Jacqui refuses and before learning that Theresa is also her half-sister. He leaves shamed when they discover the kidney is needed for his other daughter Emily Alexander (Elizabeth Henstridge). William returns for the trial and she opens up to him. At the trial, Gilly and Jacqui remember the same events very differently. The jury find Gilly not guilty. Rhys tells Jacqui that he believes her and they agree to get married. However realising she is not over her ordeal Jacqui goes to stay with her dad in Spain. Upon her return she agrees to donate a kidney to Emily. When they are not a correct match, Emily tells her they were only interested in her kidney. Jacqui and Rhys marry but their relationship is problematic because Jacqui does not want to be intimate. Jacqui cannot readjust to life in the village. She gets a job working in The Dog. After more arguments Rhys suggests they spend time apart. Jacqui then goes missing, but is later found safe. She goes to see a counsellor and she and Rhys begin to rebuild their relationship. Rhys and Jacqui find a dog which they keep and call Terry to help Jacqui get over her ordeal. Jacqui and Rhys finally consummate their marriage. Jacqui appears to be getting on with her life when Gilly returns to the village. When Rhys is continually aggressive towards Gilly, Jacqui moves back in with the McQueens. Jacqui moves back in with Rhys and they decide to move away from the village. Gilly admits that he raped Jacqui before he leaves the village. Jacqui and Rhys get a lodger Ally Gorman (Daniel O'Connor) to help with the bills and she later clashes with Mercedes after she kisses Rhys.

Jacqui meets homeless teenager Phoebe Jackson (Mandip Gill) and invites her to move into her flat. At Tony and Cindy Cunningham (Stephanie Waring)'s wedding, a bus crashes in to the venue. Rhys becomes trapped under the debris and apologises to Jacqui as he dies in her arms. Jacqui returns home to discover Rhys had planned to leave her and had left a note, detailing his plans to leave her and his affair with a mystery woman. Jacqui becomes suspicious that Cindy was having an affair with Rhys. Jacqui confronts Cindy who is with Bart's pregnant girlfriend Sinead O'Connor. She accuses Cindy only for Sinead to confess to having sex with Rhys. Jacqui confronts Sinead and realises Rhys is the father of her baby. She allows Sinead to keep the baby's paternity a secret when Bart proposes to her. On Christmas Day at the McQueens, which Tony and Cindy have both been invited to, Jacqui discovers items belonging to Rhys in the closet, including his mobile phone, which her family had been hiding from her. She recharges Rhys' phone and discovers that it was Cindy he was having an affair with. A disgusted Jacqui attacks Cindy with a Santa statue, Cindy recovers in hospital and is persuaded by Tony to keep quiet about attack and say she slipped on the ice. Jacqui drags Cindy from Hospital to Rhys' grave and warns her to stay away.

Jacqui and Tony get back together until Cindy tells Jacqui that Tony knew about her affair with Rhys leading to Jacqui breaking up with Tony again. Jacqui's former cellmate Trudy Ryan (Danniella Westbrook) arrives and starts causing trouble for Jacqui. Jacqui and Theresa become cleaners for Trudy when they need money but Trudy starts framing Jacqui for theft, planting stolen phones in her bag and paying a security guard to 'rape' Jacqui - With Trudy 'coming to her rescue' Just in time and makes a remark about what would have happened if she had actually been raped, to which Jacqui replies "I have". So Trudy then sits down with Jacqui and tells her she had also been raped by a friend. Both Trudy and Jacqui go back to Jacqui's and have a heart to heart. Though when Trudy leaves the McQueens' house after drinking with Jacqui, she smiles wickedly, implying that Trudy has lied. Phoebe also ends up being poisoned by dangerous Vodka of Trudy's. Jacqui and Tony finally get back together at Chez Chez's fancy dress party.

When Mercedes gets held to ransom by Clare Devine (Gemma Bissix) and wants £200,000 Jacqui decides she must do whatever she can to help save her. She decides to sell a man, Trevor, an empty van supposing to have vodka in while she gets nana McQueen to sell the actual vodka for £50,000 but this plan backfires when Phoebe decides to go with her – and find five illegal immigrants in the van. Jacqui lets them free but then has her life threatened by Trevor. Jacqui gets detained by police but it's Trudy they're after so Jacqui pretends to be her. But then Trudy gets arrested for human trafficking and leaves the village. With Trevor still after her, Jacqui realises she is no longer safe in Hollyoaks and must leave. But when she finds a stash of money in the loft at Trudy's office and Trevor walks in, Jacqui is visibly scared. As he advances she manages to knock him to the floor but isn't quick enough as he gets up and grabs her but Tony comes to the rescue by smashing a monitor over his head. As Jacqui and Tony escape with the money, She kicks an unconscious Trevor and legs it. As she says an emotional goodbye to Phoebe, she has a chat with John Paul and leaves the bag at the stairs for the family to find. As Tony finds Jacqui and tells her he has got Diane O'Connor (Alexandra Fletcher) pregnant Jacqui gets upset and tells Tony It's not going to be with her and makes him stick by Diane but Tony proposes to Jacqui who turns him down and gets in the taxi leaving Tony devastated.

The following week, Mercedes goes to find Jacqui in Alicante where the two had visited when they were younger. Mercedes finds Jacqui working as a barmaid. At first Jacqui is not happy to see her but the two sit down and have a conversation. Mercedes admits that at first the kidnapping was a scam to get back at Paul Browning (Joe Thompson) for supposedly cheating on her and apologizes to Jacqui. At first Jacqui is furious at Mercedes for this and yells at her causing them both to start crying. After insulting Mercedes Jacqui forgives her and tells her that she love her. Jacqui is last seen relaxing by the pool on a sun lounger drinking a cocktail with Mercedes whilst they talk and say their final goodbyes.

=== 2023 ===
10 years later in December 2023, Jacqui returns when her sister Mercedes is in need of some support after cheating on her current fiancé, Felix Westwood (Richard Blackwood) with his best friend and local criminal, Warren Fox (Jamie Lomas). Now a nun, Jacqui gives Mercedes some tough love, earning herself a slap from Mercedes. However, Jacqui manages to talk Mercedes round and the two put aside their differences. After Mercedes leaves the church, Jacqui picks up a newspaper article about a murder in Alicante, Spain, hinting that she may have been involved.

== Reception ==
Cooper was nominated for Best Actress at the 2007 Inside Soap Awards and the following year The McQueen's won the "Best Family" award. She was then nominated for "Best Actress" at the 2010 ceremony. At the 2011 National Television Awards, she received a nomination for "Best Serial Drama Performance" and "Best Actress" at the 2011 British Soap Awards. She was again nominated in the category of "Serial Drama Performance" at the 2012 National Television Awards. On Digital Spy's 2012 end of year reader poll, Cooper was nominated for "Best Female Soap Actor" and came third with 13.7% of the vote. Virgin Media criticised the character's dress sense, stating that even though none of the family have style, that Jacqui has the most 'criminal wardrobe' out of them due to her taste for thigh high boots, skin tight dresses and huge gold earrings. Co-star Kieron Richardson branded Cooper the unsung hero of the cast claiming she deserves more recognition for her work and stated his favourite character is Jacqui. Soap opera reporting website Holy Soap describe Jacqui's most memorable moment as: "Dealing with Tina's decision not to give up baby Max, only for her to be killed by long-lost brother Niall."

Roz Laws of the Sunday Mercury responded negatively to Jacqui's Promiscuity in 2010 by stating: "I DON'T like to bandy names about but...that Jacqui McQueen is a right trollop." Rhiannon Vivian of the Sunday Mirror describe Jacqui as a "hard-bitten" character. Men's lifestyle magazine FHM brand Jacqui a "notoriously sexy bad-girl". On a separate occasion Olly Richards of the magazine stated: "In the soap she always looks a bit hard and like she could definitely beat us up." Josie Ensor of WalesOnline spoke about Cooper stating: "feisty jailbird character Jacqui has made her infamous on and off screen." Kris Green of Digital Spy branded Cooper as one of his favourite Hollyoaks actresses due to her portrayal of Jacqui. Dawn Collinson of the Liverpool Echo refers to Jacqui as a "brassy character". Cooper's portrayal of Jacqui during the Enjoy The Ride storyline was well received by critics. Inside Soap journalist Sarah said Cooper was one of the "standout performances" and called Cooper one of her "all-time favourite Hollyoaks stars". All About Soap's Kerry Barrett said Cooper is "fabulous as always" while her colleague Carena Crawford said "it was Jacqui who made our hearts break as she stayed by her beloved Rhys’s side as he died" explaining that Cooper was "absolutely fantastic" during the scenes.
