= Hollyoaks: Enjoy the Ride =

Hollyoaks storyline (November 2012)

"Enjoy the Ride" is a storyline from the British soap opera Hollyoaks, broadcast between 12 and 16 November 2012 on Channel 4. The storyline focuses on the double wedding of Tony Hutchinson (Nick Pickard) and Cindy Cunningham (Stephanie Waring) alongside Ste Hay (Kieron Richardson) and Doug Carter (PJ Brennan). Jono (Dylan Llewellyn) and Ruby Button (Anna Shaffer) plan to elope to Gretna Green, so Maddie Morrison (Scarlett Bowman) steals a minibus. Bart McQueen (Jonny Clarke) and Esther Bloom (Jazmine Franks) plan to stop the wedding. They momentarily distract Maddie, causing her to swerve off the road. Maddie is unable to stop due to the minibus' faulty brakes and crashes into the venue of the double wedding, endangering the wedding party and the occupants of the minibus. The minibus later explodes, causing further danger for the characters. The storyline was announced by the Daily Star on 21 October 2012. They reported that the disaster is the biggest in Hollyoaks yet. Steven Roberts, who plays George Smith, said that after the crash "no one will be the same, everyone is going to be affected by it in some way". To promote the storyline a televised advertisement was shown, featuring clips filmed specifically for the trailer. It revealed no details about the plot and was instead about the subtext of the storyline. Filming took place on location at Knowsley Hall, which Pickard described as a "very grand setting for a big Hollyoaks disaster". The scenes were filmed over a full week with two days dedicated to the stunt sequences. The filming of the stunts used dummies and stunt doubles and employed a mix of CGI effects and live action.

It was initially reported by Daniel Kilkelly of Digital Spy that "at least two characters are expected to be killed off in the momentous episodes, but their identities will be kept closely under wraps until transmission". When the scenes aired, four regular characters were killed off in the disaster: Neil Cooper (Tosin Cole), Maddie Morrison (Scarlett Bowman), Rhys Ashworth (Andrew Moss) and Martin "Jono" Johnson (Dylan Llewellyn). The identities of the characters to die remained secret from the public up until the moment of transmission. Moss and Bowman said that they found it difficult to keep their exits a secret. Moss said he wanted his exit to remain secret so his death "came as a shock" while Bowman felt if better that the exits were not announced as "to build the suspense and the shock".

Reception of the Enjoy the Ride storyline was positive. Inside Soap critic Sarah Ellis opined that the storyline treats viewers to "everything you could possibly want from a soap", including drama, "moments that will make you gasp with shock as something completely unexpected happens" and "heartbreak as we're forced to say a premature goodbye to much-loved characters". All About Soap journalist Kerry Barrett said the episode in which the minibus crashes is one of the best episodes of Hollyoaks she has seen due to the "brilliant mix of terror, shock, surprise, and even a bit of humour". Anthony D. Langford from AfterElton.com said he "really enjoyed" the storyline, saying that "Soaps rarely have big splashy events and this soap delivered ... Soaps usually don't do action scenes well, but the car accident, following by the explosion was terrific. They were well shot and suspenseful and you really were on the edge of your seat seeing who would survive".The episodes achieved high ratings for the serial. The first episode's E4 broadcast achieved the highest ratings for a Friday episode of Hollyoaks in more than two months, while the fourth episode achieved the highest Hollyoaks' ratings for an E4 broadcast of 2012.

== Plot ==
In the run-up to Ste Hay (Kieron Richardson) and Doug Carter's (PJ Brennan) double wedding alongside Tony Hutchinson (Nick Pickard) and Cindy Cunningham (Stephanie Waring), Tony confronts Rhys Ashworth (Andy Moss) about his affair with Cindy. Rhys tells Tony that Cindy ended the affair. Tony tells Rhys to leave Hollyoaks village otherwise Tony will tell Rhys' wife Jacqui McQueen (Claire Cooper) about the affair. Jono (Dylan Llewellyn) and Ruby Button (Anna Shaffer) have a joint stag and hen party, planning to elope to Gretna Green the next day. Esther Bloom (Jazmine Franks), who is being bullied by Maddie Morrison (Scarlett Bowman) attends. Jono comforts Maddie when she is upset and Maddie attempts to kiss Jono but he rejects her; Esther witnesses this. Esther confronts Maddie, who threatens her if she reveals this.

Rhys plans to leave Hollyoaks village but Jacqui's mother Myra McQueen (Nicole Barber-Lane) convinces him to attend Tony and Cindy's wedding and say his goodbyes to Jacqui, so that she will not have to go to the wedding alone and heartbroken. Rather than tell Ruby about Jono kissing Maddie, Esther instead tells Ruby's foster parents Jack (Jimmy McKenna) and Frankie Osborne (Helen Pearson) about Ruby's plans to elope. Jack and Frankie confine Ruby to the house. Ruby's friends confront Esther, including Maddie, who viciously verbally abuses her. Maddie calls Esther, who is a lesbian, a "dyke" but Maddie's best friend Tilly Evans (Lucy Dixon), who is also Esther's ex-girlfriend, overhears this and also learns that Maddie kissed Jono. Jono distracts Jack and Frankie, allowing Ruby to change into her wedding dress and escape through a window. The Osbornes discover her missing but do not worry because Jack points out that Ruby and Jono will not be able to marry legally; they have not given the necessary notice for a wedding licence. Meanwhile, Ste discovers Doug has been trying to have Ste's ex-boyfriend Brendan Brady (Emmett J. Scanlan) jailed for his previous crimes. Ste and Doug argue, leaving Doug unsure whether they will go through with their civil partnership. Doug confronts Brendan, who reveals that he killed Danny Houston (Darren Day) to protect Ste, with Doug recording this confession on a mobile phone. Tony decides to expose Cindy's affair at the wedding.

Ste speaks to Tony and confesses that he wants to call off the civil partnership with Doug. However, Tony's words make Ste decide to go through with it; he meets Doug at the wedding venue. Bart McQueen (Jonny Clarke) has forgotten to organise transport for Jono, Ruby and their wedding guests, and cannot drive everyone to Gretna Green as he is under the influence of drugs. After some discussion as to how they will get there, Maddie decides to steal Cheryl Brady's (Bronagh Waugh) minibus. Maddie, Ruby, Jono, Sinead O'Connor (Stephanie Davis), Neil Cooper (Tosin Cole) and George Smith (Steven Roberts) all set off to Gretna Green but Tilly refuses to join them out of disgust at Maddie's behaviour. Esther asks Bart to help her stop Jono and Ruby's wedding; she is unaware that Bart has been smoking cannabis. Sinead discovers the cake from the double wedding is in the minibus so the group decides to deliver it to them. Ste and Doug go through with their civil partnership and Tony and Cindy marry. Tony plans to reveal Cindy's affair but decides not to when Cindy makes a speech in which she details her feelings for him. Ste discovers the recording of Brendan admitting to murdering Danny and tells Doug their relationship is over. Rhys tells Jacqui he is leaving the wedding and says goodbye to her, without telling her that he is leaving her forever. Rhys has left a letter for Jacqui at home and another in a wedding card for Cindy. Cindy has read her letter, and asks Rhys to take her with him when he leaves; to which he agrees. Bart and Esther catch up to the minibus in Bart's car, but he is driving erratically because he is intoxicated. Maddie discovers the brakes of the minibus do not work. When nearing the venue of the double wedding, Maddie is distracted by Bart and Esther behind them, and does not see Leah Barnes (Ela-May Demircan) in the road. She swerves to avoid hitting Leah but instead hits Ste and drives into the wedding venue. The minibus tips onto its side.

Neil appears to be dead, while the rest of the group are trapped. Rhys and Doug are trapped under rubble inside the wedding venue. Bart refuses to help those injured in the bus crash, because he believes that both he and Esther will be sent to jail for causing death while driving under the influence. Esther tries to stop him from leaving, but he drives off without letting her out of the car. Jono manages to escape from the minibus, and helps rescue Sinead and Ruby. Petrol that has leaked from the minibus ignites. Maddie and George manage to free each other, and George escapes the minibus. Maddie is also about to escape the minibus until Neil awakens and asks for her help. Maddie declines to help Neil and leaves him in the minibus, which is now alight. Maddie blames Esther for the crash but does not tell anyone that Neil is still alive inside the minibus. The minibus explodes and one of the doors is propelled into the air before it crushes Maddie to death. The explosion causes the wedding venue to collapse, and Rhys is crushed under falling debris from the building. Doug is freed from the rubble and taken to hospital along with Ste. The ambulance crew arrive and tell Jacqui that Rhys is going to die; he has severed an artery and needs immediate help, but the fire crew cannot arrive fast enough to free him. Jacqui comforts Rhys while he dies.

Phoebe McQueen (Mandip Gill) finds Rhys' letter to Jacqui, explaining that he was leaving her for Cindy. Jacqui begins to mourn Rhys but, when she breaks the news to Phoebe that he has died, Phoebe decides not to show Jacqui the letter. Jono blames himself for the accident and for not saving Maddie and Neil, even though Jack tries to tell him that he is a hero who saved Ruby's and Sinead's lives. Cheryl takes Bart to hospital to see Sinead, and George blames Bart for causing the accident. Cheryl explains that no one could have prevented the accident; she had forgotten to get the brakes repaired, and was not expecting anyone to use the bus. At the hospital Sinead is told she is pregnant, while Doug learns that Ste is comatose. Brendan has gone to see Ste in the hospital and Doug initially fights with Brendan, but then allows Brendan to comfort him. Bart tells Esther that she is just as much to blame for the crash as he is, and that she must not tell anyone he was driving while intoxicated. He goes to visit Sinead but she blames him for not helping them after the crash happened, and does not tell him about her pregnancy. Ste flatlines and has to be resuscitated. Jacqui breaks down crying upon discovering that Rhys had packed his belongings. Jono and Ruby sit outside and decide to marry properly instead of eloping. Ruby tells Jono about her childhood and they sit and look at the stars. Ruby realises that Jono has died in her arms, from undiscovered internal injuries.

The deaths of Jono, Maddie, Neil and Rhys lead to Ruby and Sinead, who is pregnant with Rhys' baby, bullying Esther after she informed the police that Bart had caused the bus crash that leads her attempted suicide. However, Ruby feels guilty and forced Sinead to tell the truth to everyone, as she refused, but lucky Esther video it to explored their secret, with Ruby was suspended and Sinead expelled.

== Creation and development ==
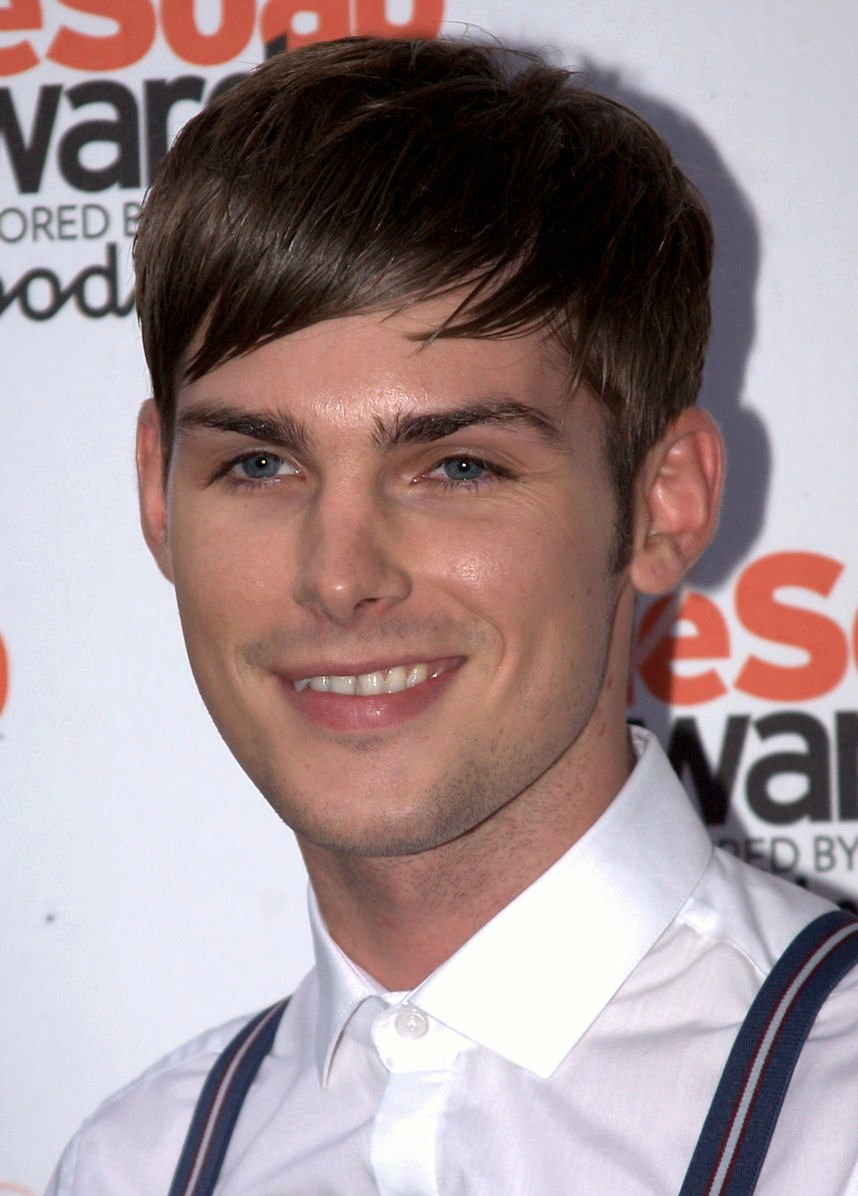
Kieron Richardson (pictured) described the events during the storyline as "one of the biggest stunts in soap history".

Susan Hill from the Daily Star announced the storyline on 21 October 2012. She reported "lots of lives will be lost in the tragedy – the biggest Hollyoaks has seen". A show source told Hill that it was a "huge stunt" and that "a lot of money has been spent making it look as realistic as possible. A team of stuntmen and women were brought in and bosses hired some of the best special effects people in the business. The bus crash will be a disaster no one will ever forget". Daniel Kilkelly of Digital Spy announced that an upcoming storyline would feature "another tragic storyline twist" as "wedding day joy turns to horror for a number of the soap's characters". He added that the event would "change life in the village forever". Executive producer of Hollyoaks Bryan Kirkwood revealed that he worked alongside series producer Emma Smithwick to create the storyline. He explained that together they "decided that it was time for a big, show-stopping, blockbuster sequence to grab the audience's attention and hopefully bring them back to Hollyoaks. We realised we needed to engage some of the older audience again and this was how to do it". Richardson said that the crash and the following explosion are "one of the biggest stunts in soap history", while Moss told What's on TV that it is "the biggest stunt that I think Hollyoaks have ever done and we've all pulled together to make it the best". Brennan explained that the storyline is "really dramatic storyline" which is a "good reflection of the direction that we're going in at Hollyoaks. We're going back to the show's soap roots and doing some big, bombastic storylines". Brennan felt that the scenes included the "hardest day" he has had at Hollyoaks while filming the storyline due to the filming demanding "so much in terms of the depths of emotions". He added that audiences could expect "big emotions" due to the large number of characters at risk. The scenes become "very, very dramatic for many characters in the village". Roberts said that after the crash "no one will be the same, everyone is going to be affected by it in some way. It's going to be carnage, it's going to be messy, people are going to get hurt, it's going to be sad but it is exciting too".

The episodes were said to feature the double wedding of Tony and Cindy alongside Ste and Doug. Jono and Ruby also plan to elope to Gretna Green so steal a minibus. Bart and Esther try to stop the minibus so Jono and Ruby will not marry. Driver Maddie is distracted and almost runs over Leah, but swerves off the road to avoid her. Maddie drives into the double wedding venue, crashing the minibus before it explodes. Several factors lead to the crash of the minibus. Shaffer said that the minibus' faulty brakes and the dangerous behaviour of Esther and Bart are largely to blame. Shaffer explained that Esther and Bart are doing it out of the "goodness of their hearts" and are not being malicious in trying to stop the wedding but "a certain amount of blame does have to lie with them!"

Kilkelly explained that the storyline was created to "reveal secrets and lies that many had fought hard to keep hidden". Brennan elaborated on this, saying the crash comes at the "worst time possible" because there is a "gigantic reveal between Ste and Doug" before the crash. He added that the secret that Doug "has gone behind Ste's back to take out Brendan" is revealed at the wedding. Tony initially plans to reveal Cindy's infidelity during the service but does not. Waring told All About Soap magazine that Cindy decides to "run away" with Rhys, which is witnessed by Tony but then "she looks up and sees the bus coming right for them!" The actress said Cindy "has a load of secrets" and that there will "be a lot of repercussions" following her decision to run away with Rhys.

Kilkelly announced that "at least two characters are expected to be killed off in the momentous episodes, but their identities will be kept closely under wraps until transmission". Brennan said that Doug is "definitely in danger" as is "anyone who is at the wedding is in danger considering that a bus ploughs through the venue". Soap expert Susan Hill, writing for the Daily Star noted that Tony, Cindy, Rhys, Ste, Doug, Ruby, Maddie and Neil were all possibilities to die in the storyline. When the fourth episode aired three regular characters: Neil, Maddie and Rhys were killed off. The identities' of the characters to die was kept secret from the public up until the moment of transmission. In the following and concluding episode of the week another "shock" death aired when Jono who had appeared uninjured from the crash died from undetected internal injures. Another "big twist" which was also previously unannounced saw Sinead discover she was pregnant. Kirkwood explained that the "high death toll was a mix of [himself and Smithwick] feeling that some characters had come to the end of the line, and other actors deciding it was time for them to go".

Moss disclosed that it was difficult to keep his exit a secret but that he was careful that the details did not emerge so that the death scene "came as a shock". Moss told Kilkelly that when he was considering leaving the serial he was told about the stunt and was "really keen to be involved" in the scenes. He said that his "big death scene at the end was another first for Hollyoaks, because they left the camera on Rhys and Jacqui for the whole scene and let it play out". Moss said the tears during the scene between himself and Cooper were "absolutely real" and that the scenes were not rehearsed so that the emotions were raw and fresh. Moss described the filming of his death scene as "really upsetting" which "really added to the emotions" that played out onscreen. Bowman said it was difficult to keep her exit "under wraps" but that it worked well to make the exit memorable. She explained that she felt if better that the exits were not announced as "to build the suspense and the shock". Bowman explained that Maddie's death was devised to give her character comeuppance for bullying Esther. On Maddie's decision to leave Neil to die, Bowman explained that Maddie "could have helped a mate, she doesn't she saves herself, so I think by the time the door comes the audience is like yes, you deserve that".

== Production ==
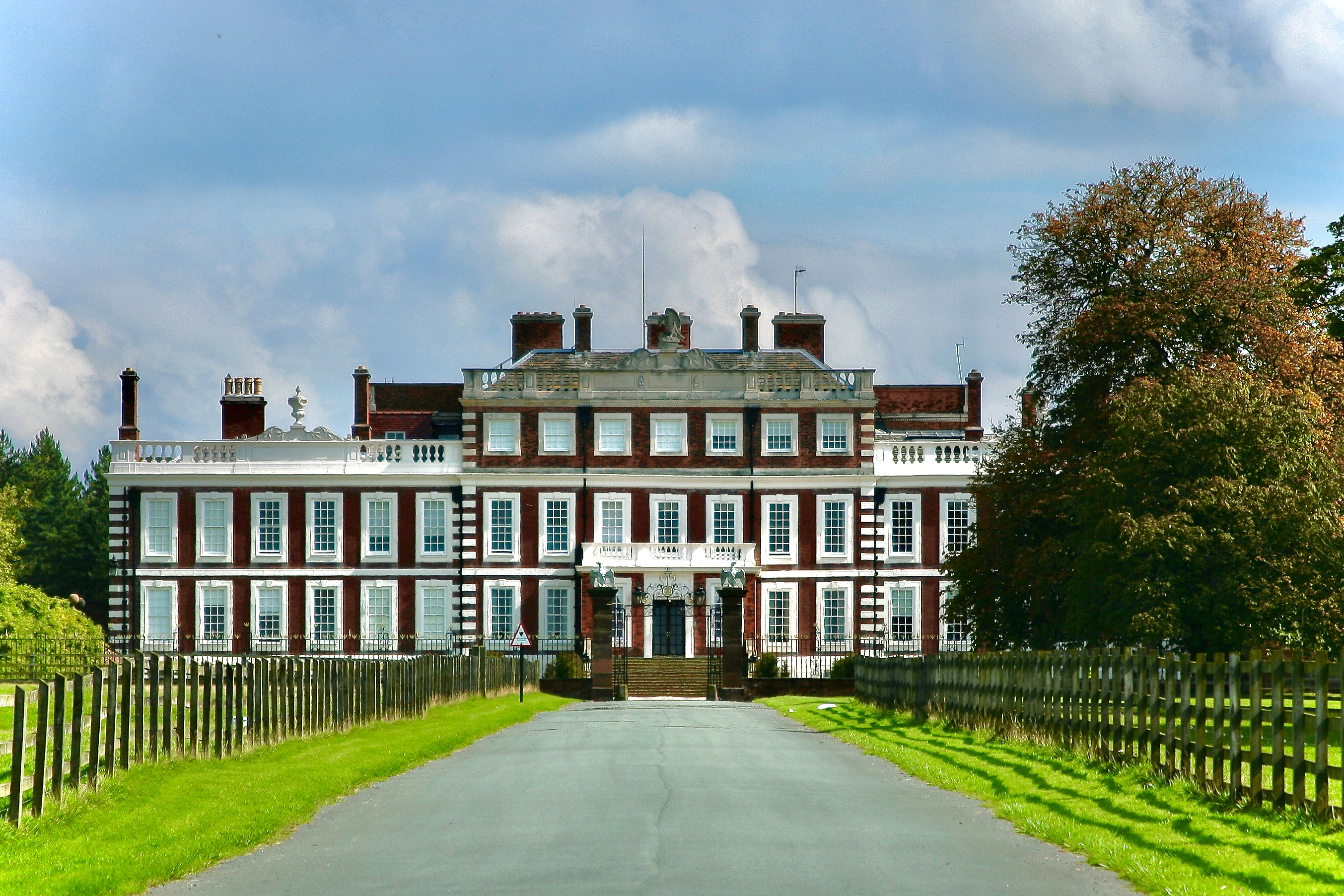
The scenes were shot on-location on a set built at Knowsley Hall.

Pickard revealed that the cast filmed on-location at Knowsley Hall, which he felt is a "very grand setting for a big Hollyoaks disaster". The episodes were filmed at an especially built set of an Orangery. Brennan disclosed that the on-location scenes were filmed over a full week with two days devoted to the "actual stunts". Bowman revealed that the actors were suspended in the minibus for a day of filming. Moss revealed that filming his death scenes lasted for two days and that for the duration of filming he had to stay "laying on the floor outside, in the rain". Brennan added that the cast and crew worked from "8 am to 8 pm every day". Moss disclosed that he did not finish filming scenes for the crash until 6 November because he was required to film extra scenes at the "last minute" to improve the quality of the storyline. Shaffer expressed that the cast members involved in the minibus crash "got knocked about doing some of the scenes in the van" which resulted in her receiving "huge bruises all over". Shaffer added that they used stunt doubles and dummies for the "more serious stuff". Brennan also commented on the use of stunt doubles, saying that they were used so that a large amount of the human involvement in the accident is "genuine". Brennan said that there were "a couple of injuries" amongst cast members while filming the scenes. Commenting on to what extent the scenes use special effects, Brennan said: "it looks fantastic given that it's a mix of real-life people and CGI effects. I don't think you can really tell when it comes to the special effects. It's a perfect blend. Hollyoaks have invested a lot of money and time into this storyline, and I think it's paid off".

A real explosion was created during the filming of the episodes. Pickard said the explosion was "the biggest explosion I've ever seen in my life", explaining that he "watched from a safe distance" but he could still feel the heat due to the size of the explosion. On filming the explosion, Bowman said: "all the crew were put about four miles back behind cones, then the stunt double team were put about 10, 15 metres from the explosion, and then the sixth formers, including me, were the same distance as the stunt guys". She explained that she had to face away from the explosion and that the director instructed her not to "mess up" the continuity of the scene. She was instructed to "leap away from the explosion" which she initially felt would be easy but when the explosion played out she "just flew". Bowman explained that she could not see and could only feel the "burning heat" and hear a "horrendous explosion". Moss added that everything the audience see during the explosion is authentic.

== Promotion ==
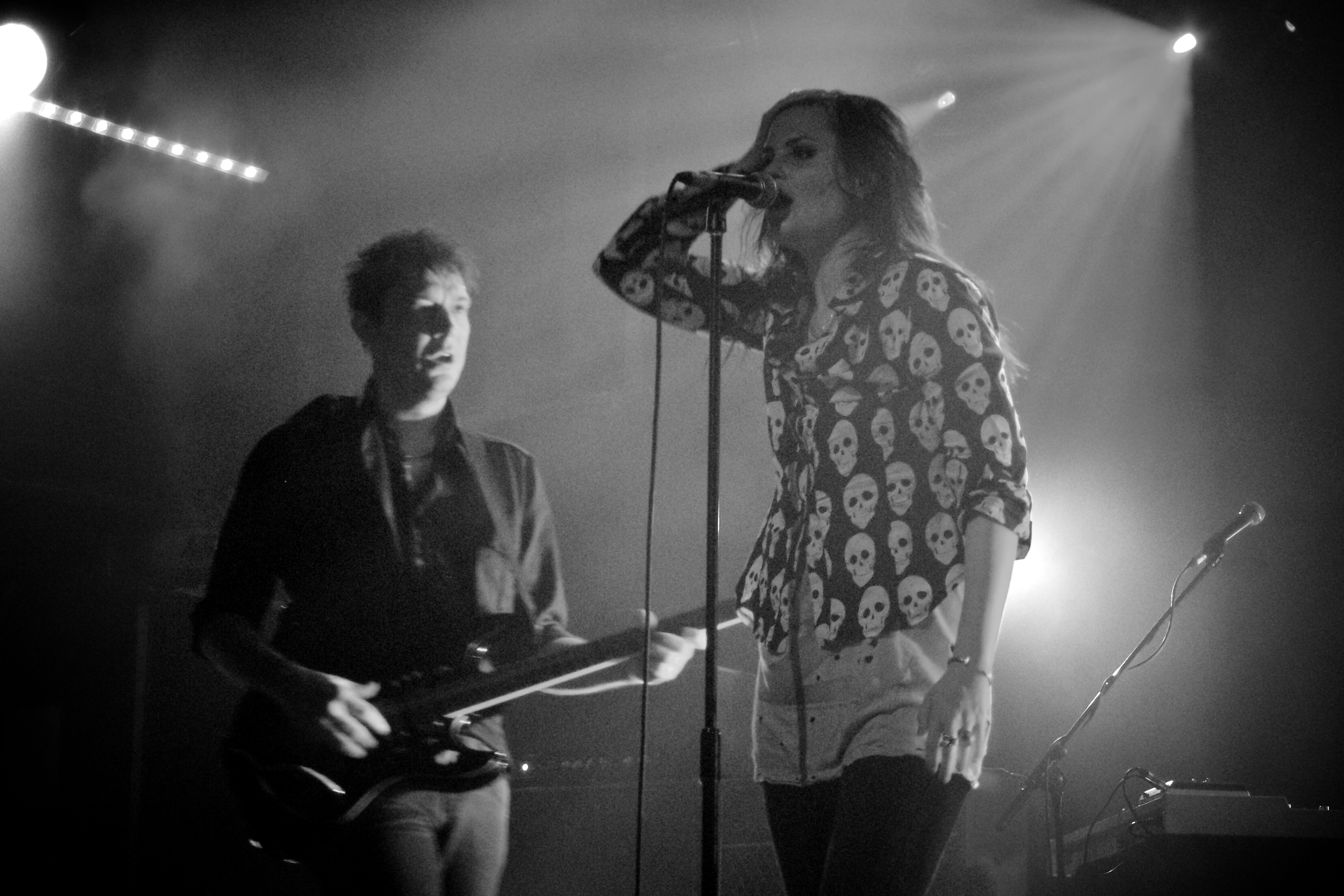
The "Last Goodbye" by The Kills was used in a trailer to promote the storyline

A promotional trailer was released by E4's official Hollyoaks' website before it began airing on television. The song "Last Goodbye" by The Kills was used in the trailer, which did not use clips from the storyline, but instead featured clips filmed especially for the trailer. It shows several characters involved in the storyline standing together in a hall dressed for a wedding. Rhys and Cindy look at each other before holding hands, while standing with their partners Jacqui and Tony. The back wall of the hall explodes, throwing the characters away from each other. Cindy and Rhys are torn apart as they reach to each other, Ste and Doug float through empty space while holding on to each other and Maddie drops into darkness. The advertisement ends as Jacqui sits in the wreckage of the hall, crying. Brennan explained that the "promo is all about the subtext" so that it does not "really give anything away" or reveal any clues about the fate of the characters involved. He added that the trailer is "more artistic than anything else". The scenes were filmed over one day and were shot on-location in London in a set built specifically for the shoot. Wires were used to elevate cast members during the filming and a smoke machine was used for effect. Davis explained that to simulate an explosion "a full bag of dust" and gold glitter was fired at the cast who had to throw themselves on to crash mats as the simulated explosion happened. Cooper explained that her part in the trailer shows her character as the "realisation of what has happened" sets in. She explained that the trailer closes with Jacqui as an "abstract tear" rolls down her face, which was added using a "dropper" after the scene was filmed. To promote the storyline, cast members Moss and Bowman appeared on T4 in which they were interviewed and discussed the storyline.

== Reception ==
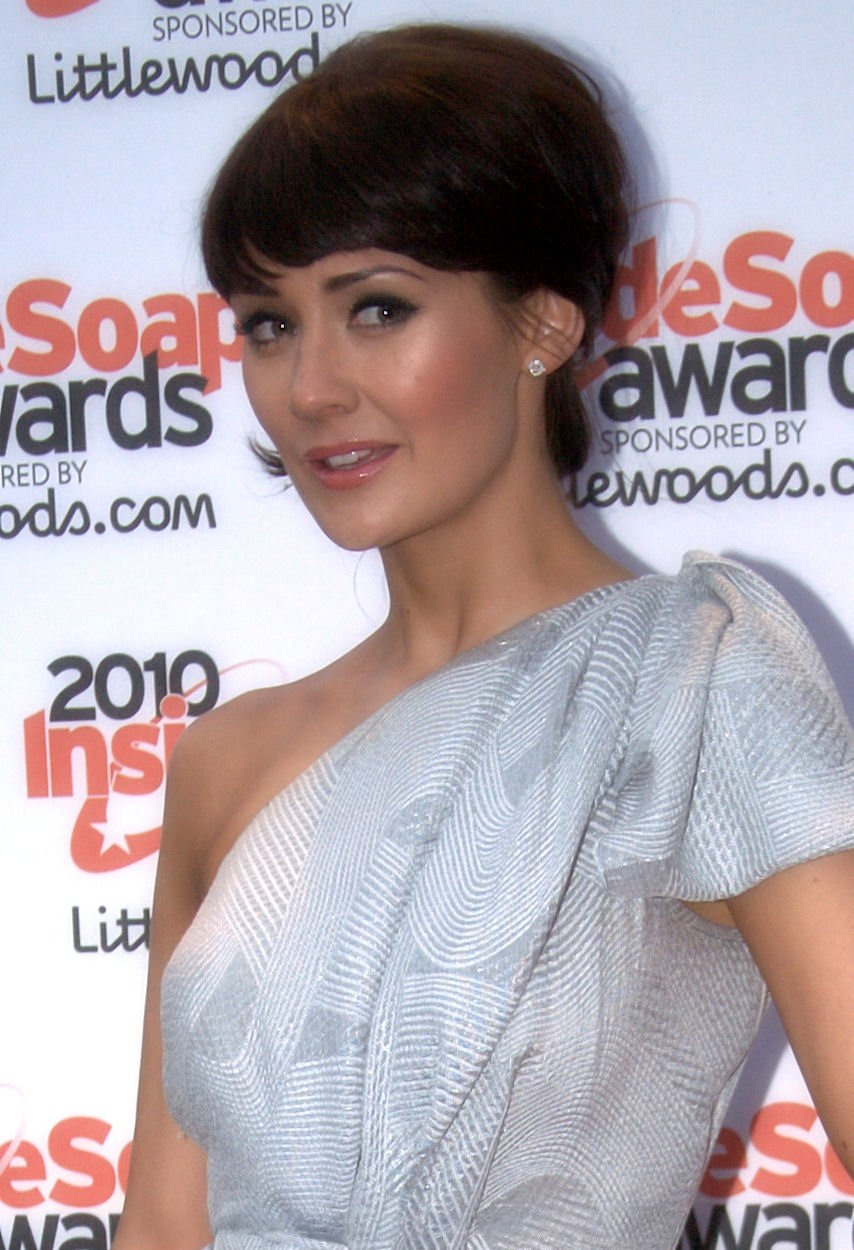
Claire Cooper's portrayal of Jacqui McQueen in the storyline was well received by critics.

Digital Spy readers voted the storyline as the best upcoming plot in Digital Spy's storyline poll, with 69.0% of readers choosing the storyline. Digital Spy chose the wedding day crash as their "pic of the day" feature while Radio Times made the episode their "Soap pick of the day". On Digital Spy's 2012 end of year reader poll, Enjoy the Ride was nominated for Best Storyline and came third when it received 25.0% of the vote. Inside Soap critic Sarah opined that fans "won't want to miss a moment of the explosive action in Hollyoaks" and that she "loved it so much" that she wanted to see it again. Continuing, Sarah commented: "There's no expense spared as the minibus loses control and ploughs into the wedding venue, crashing straight through and out the other side. But the biggest drama is yet to come! In the aftermath of the crash, we're treated to everything you could possibly want from a soap. There's drama as the minibus explodes in a ball of fire. There are moments that will make you gasp with shock as something completely unexpected happens. And then there's heartbreak as we're forced to say a premature goodbye to much-loved characters – and I defy you not to cry along with the devastated loved ones they left behind". Sarah said "there are standout performances from some of my all-time favourite Hollyoaks stars, including Claire Cooper, Andrew Moss, Nick Pickard and Stephanie Waring. And whether you love or loathe the sixth-formers, they certainly have their part to play as the drama unfolds over the rest of the week". She concluded that it is "Hollyoaks at its very best. So buckle up and enjoy the ride".

All About Soap journalist Kerry Barrett wrote that readers should stop what they are doing "immediately and watch Hollyoaks instead. It's going to be one of the most explosive episodes ever!" Barrett opined: "it's one of the best 'Oaks we've ever seen! It's got a brilliant mix of terror, shock, surprise, and even a bit of humour – and there are some amazing performances from the cast. Claire Cooper is fabulous as always, and watch out for Andrew Moss, Steph Waring and Jazmine Franks, who all act their socks off". Barrett concluded that viewers will not want to miss the fourth episode when "the fallout from the dramatic wedding day continues. There won't be a dry eye in the house..." Barrett's All About Soap colleague Carena Crawford said: "OMG! Did you just watch Hollyoaks? Rhys is dead! And so are Maddie and Neil! We're in shock! We don't even know where to start: it was so good. With Rhys trapped under the rubble, Cindy wanted to go to him, but she knew she couldn't. We felt a bit sorry for her, but it was Jacqui who made our hearts break as she stayed by her beloved Rhys's side as he died". Crawford added that Cooper was "absolutely fantastic" at portraying Jacqui. On Maddie's death, Crawford said: "How brutal was that? After the queen bee saved her own skin by leaving poor Neil to die in pain when the minibus exploded, she was a goner herself after the flaming car door flew off the vehicle and crushed her. Talk about jaw-dropping!" Anthony D. Langford from AfterElton.com said he "really enjoyed Hollyoaks last week and it's been awhile since I have been thoroughly entertained by the show. Soaps rarely have big splashy events and this soap delivered". He added that he "thought the scenes surrounding the disaster were brilliantly done. Soaps usually don't do action scenes well, but the car accident, following by the explosion was terrific. They were well shot and suspenseful and you really were on the edge of your seat seeing who would survive – especially since the show had teased that two characters were going to die, though they actually ended up killing off four". He explained that the serial was "determined to keep under-wraps who would die". Langford said he was not shocked at Neil's death, he found Maddie's death to be "a bit of a shock, especially since she had survived the accident, only to be killed by falling debris" and felt Jono's death "was definitely a surprise because it came out of nowhere. One minute he was fine and the next he was dead". Langford said that he was not "shocked" at Rhys' death but that he felt that Moss and Cooper "were beautiful and heartbreaking in those moments".

=== Ratings ===
The first episode aired on E4's first look service and achieved the best Friday first-look ratings for Hollyoaks in over two months with 0.554 million viewers. When the episode aired on Channel 4 it was watched by 1.03 million viewers. E4's first look of the second episode achieved ratings of 0.567 million while it was watched by 1.06 million during the Channel 4 broadcast. The third episode of the week's E4 broadcast was watched by 0.684 million viewers while the Channel 4 broadcast was viewed by 1.05 million. The fourth episode's E4 broadcast which featured the deaths of three characters was viewed by 0.970 million. This was the highest E4 rating for Hollyoaks of 2012 and the most-watched multichannel programme of the day. When the fourth episode aired on Channel 4 it brought 1.04 million viewers. The final episode of the week was watched by 0.780 million viewers on E4. When the episode aired on Channel 4 it achieved 1.19 million viewers, which was the highest ratings for of the Enjoy the Ride storyline for Channel 4. As a result of the storyline, the E4 broadcast of the aftermath of the storyline continued to achieve high ratings for the serial.
