= Brendan Brady =

Fictional character from Hollyoaks

- Hollyoaks character
- Portrayed by: Emmett J. Scanlan
- Duration: 2010–2013
- First appearance: 5 August 2010
- Last appearance: 22 March 2013
- Introduced by: Paul Marquess
- Spin-off appearances: Hollyoaks Later (2012); Hollyoaks Favourites (2020)
In-universe information
- Occupation: Club manager (2010–2011); Drug dealer (2010–2012); Club owner (2011–2013)
- Father: Seamus Brady
- Half-sisters: Cheryl Brady
- Wife: Eileen Brady (backstory)
- Sons: Declan Brady; Padraig Brady
- Daughters: Niamh Brady
- Grandmothers: Flo Brady

Brendan Brady is a fictional character from the British Channel 4 soap opera Hollyoaks, played by Emmett J. Scanlan. The character was introduced on 5 August 2010 by series producer Paul Marquess during part of the show's overhaul, and became one of Hollyoaks' most popular characters. He is easily recognised by his famous horseshoe moustache. He is the older half-brother of already established character Cheryl Brady (Bronagh Waugh). Following the announcement of Brendan's casting, he was quickly billed as the show's new "bad boy" character. Despite having the persona of a villain at the start of the show, as the show progressed the character was portrayed to be more of a tragic antihero. He made his final appearance on 22 March 2013.

== Creation and casting ==
Irish actor Emmett J. Scanlan was cast as Brendan by series producer Paul Marquess after being put forward for the role by casting director Dorothy Andrews. Scanlan previously auditioned for the roles of Kieron Hobbs and Des Townsend, but was asked by producers to drop his accent. Brendan was originally to be from Belfast, Northern Ireland, like sister Cheryl Brady. This detail was however changed to make Cheryl and Brendan half-siblings and Brendan's backstory was changed so he comes from Dublin, Ireland, to avoid confusion with Scanlan's accent.

Details of the character of Brendan were first hinted in April 2010, when Marquess referred to Brendan as a "very nasty man" appearing from Cheryl's past. Later in April, Brendan's casting was officially announced.

At the same time of his casting, the characters of Lynsey Nolan (Karen Hassan) and Bart McQueen (Jonny Clarke) were also signed to appear in the show. Marquess spoke of the characters' arrivals, saying: "This is a really exciting time for Hollyoaks and Brendan, Lynsey and Bart bring more fun, drama and sexiness to the show." Scanlan commented on his new role, saying: "I'm a bad-ass in it. I play a bad guy with a dark secret who goes by [the] name of Brendan. It's a good healthy stint of six to seven months and I can't wait to get started. It's all about new experiences and Hollyoaks has a very impressive history. It's great to be part of it." Scanlan originally signed a six-month contract, which was later extended.

== Development ==
=== Characterisation ===
The main focal point of Brendan's characteristics was his 'villain' persona. Scanlan described Brendan's personality, saying: "I don't know how to describe him in five words. I don't think he is either good or bad. Brendan's a man who defines his own moral code and principles, and lives with the consequences. He's the type of dude that will hit you as quick as look at you, but never touch a girl. His principles may be different to yours or mine but he's not good or bad, he's just... Brendan."

Actress Bronagh Waugh, who plays Brendan's sister Cheryl, has claimed that Brendan is "one of the most evil soap villains ever", stating: "Brendan is the nastiest bad boy I've ever seen — I'm talking worse than EastEnders' Dirty Den. If you think he's been mean so far, you haven't seen anything yet! The thing is that he does care for Cheryl and has good intentions towards her. But events won't turn out the way he planned."

During an interview in May 2010, Marquess was asked about Brendan and if he was a bad boy. He replied: "Oh, definitely — he's an absolute bastard! I think people are going to think, 'Here's the next Warren', but they'll be surprised when they find out what the real story is. He is Cheryl's half-brother… and Cheryl won't hear a bad word against him..."

In a further interview with Press Association, Scanlan said: "I have never had the opportunity to play somebody as complex and as damaged as Brendan. He is without doubt a sociopathic, self-loathing, homophobic gay man and that in itself is a fascinating attraction for any actor to play. I think any actor would love a challenge, when you're doing a role if it pushes your boundaries and takes you out of yourself and allows you to experience different things. I think that's great. So coming up to do the part was exciting for me."

Scanlan later spoke about his character and said: "Brendan is a king manipulator. He lulls people into a false sense of security — it's like a fly being drawn to the spider. Because he's such a king manipulator, he can talk the underwear off this fella [Ste] and he's very confident. So yeah, he definitely knows. He sees Steven as a young, vulnerable guy who has no male friends, who hasn't had a father figure, and who — like Brendan — is a father himself. So Brendan can play with that." He also called Brendan "unpredictable" and "complex".

Marquess revealed in December 2010 that 2011 would explore more of the character's background and the reasons for his "twisted" personality: "What we've played in 2010 in introducing Brendan is this very dark and twisted character. One thing we want to do in 2011 is to explain why he's like that. The whole domestic violence angle does continues to play but in really quite an unexpected way. The safest thing I can say is everyone should remember it was Ste who hit Amy [Barnes] first. So it's a dark and interwoven story made all the more complicated by the introduction of a new love interest for Ste."

=== Domestic violence ===
In September 2010, Kieron Richardson announced an upcoming gay plot featuring his character Ste Hay and Brendan, claiming the pair would embark on an "unusual friendship". However, Brendan and Ste's relationship will become violent, touching on domestic abuse. After the announcement, Paul Marquess said: "This is a long running storyline and while it is dark to begin with, the lessons that Ste learns are ultimately positive and life affirming. This story is about not being afraid to be who you are and while this is something Brendan struggles with, Ste is refreshingly accepting of his feelings towards another man. I hope viewers will be glued throughout the twists and turns as we unravel how Brendan came to be the twisted person we have been watching on screen."

Ste kisses Brendan, the start of the gay plot (2010).

Meanwhile, Scanlan admitted he was glad Brendan is becoming "a complex character" and "not a gratuitous soap villain, but a multi-layered character with depth, a troubled past and an unsure future". He continued: "I hope that as the storyline develops, viewers will be able to understand why Brendan has become the villain they see today. Brendan is compelled to manipulate and control everyone who crosses his path. At the moment this makes him dangerous but when we identify why he behaves this way, we will discover his vulnerabilities and this is exciting..."

Scanlan later explained: "Because Hollyoaks is a 6.30pm show we had to find different ways to tell the story in a convincing way and leave most of it to the imagination of the audience. And in more cases than not, your own imagination is much more visual and more horrific than what you see on screen, so we tried to push things, drop little things, without actually showing anything explicit, but it was an incredible experience. Brendan's an extraordinary character to play."

""I think that the Brendan and Ste storyline has been fantastic — they're both brilliant and, God, you couldn't have asked for stronger chemistry than what they've got on screen"

— Paul Marquess discussing Brendan and Ste's relationship

Scanlan, in an interview with Digital Spy, explained the research he put into the abuse storyline: "The thing about it is that every case is different and every story is different. The principles are the same, but it's always different. With this, the writers give you your homework, so to speak — you explore it and you research it, because you want to give it the best truthfulness that you can. Obviously it's your work that's going out on screen, and your credibility goes with that. So you definitely need to do your homework." After asked about what kind of impact and response he wanted the storyline to have, Scanlan replied: "I've always wanted the storyline to be subtle. I didn't want it to be thrown into this violent, sociopathic gay relationship straight away as that would lose its credibility — and credit to the writers and Paul Marquess because it has been very subtle and it's built over the weeks," he continued, "I also want the story to evoke emotion — not just in the cast around me, but in the crew, the writers, the producers and the people who are investing half an hour of their lives into watching Hollyoaks each night. Whether those emotions are hatred, disgust or love or anything — I just want it to evoke something. I want it to touch on things, and I hope people are affected by it. But things like this are completely outside of the actors' control - we just have to give some truth to the storyline and try to make it as interesting as possible. We can't leave people short-changed. You never know, Brendan might become the most hated guy in England soon - that'd be a nice thing to have on the resumé!"

=== Departure ===
On 9 January 2013, Daniel Kilkelly from Digital Spy announced Brendan's departure from the show. Scanlan had decided to leave the role and his character’s departure came in March 2013. He explained that "the time has come for me to sign out of Hollyoaks, to bow out as Double B aka Brendan motherfucking Brady." Sharing the experience with fans had been the "greatest honour" for the actor. Kilkelly added that producers had devised a dramatic exit storyline for Brendan but remained secretive about any other details.

== Storylines ==
Brendan first arrives during a fight between Mercedes Fisher (Jennifer Metcalfe) and Cheryl. He holds Cheryl back, and introduces himself as Cheryl's brother. He then catches up with Cheryl and reveals he caught his wife Eileen in bed with another man, and so he left his wife and kids behind in Ireland. Cheryl is sympathetic towards him. Whilst staying with Cheryl, Brendan steals £20 from her wallet. Later on in The Dog in the Pond, Cheryl mentions how she was unable to buy The Loft nightclub. Brendan tells her he has a friend called Danny Houston (Darren Day) who could help out. Barman Carl Costello (Paul Opacic) recognises the name and warns Malachy Fisher (Glen Wallace) that Danny is shady and potentially dangerous. Malachy confronts Brendan about this, but Brendan warns him to mind his own business. The McQueen home is robbed by Veronica (Lynsey McLaren), an accomplice of Brendan's. Brendan begins working as a manager at Chez Chez after Cheryl goes into partnership with Danny. Brendan then robs the club, but is recognised by Malachy. Cheryl does not believe that Brendan is responsible for the theft of the club's takings. To cover his tracks, Brendan later frames Veronica, who is arrested.

Brendan befriends Carmel Valentine (Gemma Merna), and plans to use her to smuggle drugs into the country from Barcelona. Ste convinces Carmel not to go, but when Brendan decides to take Ste's ex-girlfriend Amy Barnes (Ashley Slanina-Davies), Ste convinces Carmel to go ahead with the holiday after all. The student halls of residence is burgled by Doug Carter (PJ Brennan), who gives Brendan the money for drugs. Brendan's wife Eileen turns up at ChezChez unexpected. She reveals that their son Declan is ill and needs money for specialist treatment. Brendan accidentally mugs Cheryl, believing it was Rhys Ashworth (Andrew Moss). He then pays Eileen the money. As she leaves, Ste tells Malachy he believes Brendan was responsible for Cheryl's mugging, after seeing Brendan give Eileen the money. Malachy and Lynsey Nolan (Karen Hassan) confront Cheryl, who again refuses to believe Brendan would do such a thing.

When Rae Wilson (Alice Barlow) returns, Brendan is jealous of her and Ste's relationship. Veronica arrives at ChezChez and ends up kissing Ste, following Brendan's orders, as Rae walks in. When Ste overhears Brendan talking to Veronica, he confronts him as to why he was trying to end Ste and Rae's relationship. Brendan invites Jacqui McQueen (Claire Cooper) to lunch with him and Danny. He assumes that he and Jacqui have a relationship, however seems angered when Jacqui does not show interest. Ste overhears a phone conversation between Brendan and Macca, whom he is shouting at. Brendan violently begins trashing the office when Macca ends the phone call and when he notices Ste, he tells him to leave. After Brendan returns from a business trip, he is furious to discover Macca has arrived in Hollyoaks and has been given a job by Cheryl. Brendan later threatens Macca, who is not seen again. Jacqui finds Brendan with bloody hands, suggesting he beat Macca up. After a night out, Brendan and Ste return to Brendan's home, where they eventually kiss. Brendan reacts by throwing a confused Ste out. The next day, Ste is worried when Brendan confronts him. However, they kiss again. Ste questions whether Brendan is avoiding him, however Brendan tells him to lock the door to the cellar so they are alone. As Ste tries to kiss Brendan, Brendan punches Ste, and he falls to the floor. Brendan later manipulates Ste into telling Cheryl that he was mugged.

Brendan later tells Ste that it was all his fault and manages to get Ste into bed yet again. Amy finds out about Ste and Brendan and Brendan's abuse of Ste. Brendan continually threatens her to keep quiet. On the same night, Il Gnosh is set fire to whilst Amy is babysitting in the flat above and she is almost killed. At hospital, Macca reappears following his beating from Brendan, who he tells he wants back. Brendan threatens Macca, telling him to leave for Northern Ireland once again. Cheryl then invites Macca to stay with her and Brendan. Amy tells Ste that she thinks Brendan started the fire and decides to move away for her own safety. Macca tells Rae about Ste and Brendan's relationship. Rae confronts Ste over the affair and later tells Cheryl that Brendan is gay, which he denies. Brendan begins a brief relationship with India Longford (Beth Kingston).

Brendan and Ste go on a date in public. However, Brendan is uncomfortable and leaves. Danny and Brendan decide to get rid of Warren Fox (Jamie Lomas). Brendan, however, double-crosses Danny after discovering he was responsible for the death of Brendan's former male lover. Danny agrees to sign over his half of Chez Chez, but tells Brendan he will be paying Ste a visit. Angered by Danny's threats, Brendan attacks and murders Danny by beating him with a hammer until he is killed. Warren and Brendan then dispose of Danny's body. Amy returns and confronts Brendan, telling him Rae is pregnant with Ste's child. Brendan later ends his relationship with Ste, giving him a final kiss as Mitzeee (Rachel Shenton) watches. Mitzeee confronts Brendan and agrees to pretend to be his girlfriend in exchange for him managing her modeling career, to which Brendan agrees. When Rae goes to an abortion clinic, Brendan manages to stop her and reveals that his first child Niamh died at birth. He also reveals his father left his mother for Cheryl's mother. Brendan and Rae become friends, but he continues to sleep with Ste. Mitzeee causes Rae to discover the affair. Brendan and Rae argue, which causes Rae to miscarry her child. After this, Rae blames Brendan.

After Danny Houston's body is found, Warren is arrested because Brendan planted his credit card into Danny's dead body. Warren realises that Brendan has set him up and so reveals to Ste that Brendan killed Danny Houston to protect him. After Ste confronts him, Brendan confirms that he killed Danny. Devastated, Ste tells him they're over. Brendan realises that Warren told Ste about Danny. Furious, he goes round to his and Mitzee's new flat where he catches her and Warren kissing. Fuming, they both storm outside and a huge fight erupts. Eventually, after fighting their way around the village, they decide to call a truce on their silly feud. After pushing Ste too far, Ste attacks Brendan then reveals to Cheryl he's gay. Cheryl also overhears Brendan telling old friend Pete Hamill he did steal from the club. Cheryl blames Brendan for her falling out with Malachy before his death and refuses to speak to Brendan. Brendan returns to Ireland but comes back two weeks later and hires Jenny to scam Warren out of £200,000. After getting the money Warren threatens to tell everyone he is gay which leads to Brendan outing himself by kissing Ste in the middle of the club. With his £200,000 Brendan buys 49% of Chez Chez.

Ste tells Brendan he has a new boyfriend Noah Baxter. Brendan then goes out of his way to split them up, first by attempting to seduce Noah. Though the plan works briefly, and Ste and Noah split, they reunite quickly. Ste then decides to move away with Noah but later changes his mind, after witnessing Noah cheating once again. Ste contemplates reuniting with Brendan, but he finds out the man Noah was with had been hired by Brendan. However, Brendan goes out of his way to get Ste back, eventually telling Ste he loves him. The pair sleep together again, when Brendan's ex-wife Eileen walks in on them and demands to know what is going on. Brendan revels it is a misunderstanding, and Eileen warns Brendan that if the children find out, she will ban him from seeing them. Eileen then tells Brendan he will have to look after Declan (Jay Duffy) while she is away. He agrees to do so. Desperate to keep Ste as well though, Brendan agrees to go to Florida with him, but at the last minute, bottles it, heading to Blackpool with Declan instead.

Brendan also supports Lynsey, after she believes Silas Blissett is out to get her. Ste returns, and soon reveals to Declan that he is gay. Having to suffer Declan's questions, Brendan is angered by this, and warns Ste to stay away. As Ste continues making sniping comment to Brendan, Brendan lashes out, as Declan walks in. Ste threatens to go to the police, and gets as far as the police station before Brendan stops him, telling him about life growing up with his father. Brendan reveals that his dad would often come home drunk, drag Brendan out of bed, wanting to fight, whilst calling him names, which are linked to sexuality, but also in Brendan's head as weakness. Ste tells Brendan to tell Declan the truth, and Brendan agrees to do so, but changes his mind later.

Brendan decides that he wants to be in a relationship with a woman, and sees a vulnerable Lynsey as the perfect one. He makes his move on her, but is quickly rebuffed, and as the pair argue over the coming days, are unaware they are being watched by a camera Silas has hidden in the flat. As Lynsey continues to think she is being manipulated by Silas, she decides to leave for a while, but Brendan witnesses Silas watching Lynsey depart and warns Silas that he is keeping an eye on him. A week later Lynsey returns from her trip and says she feels calmer. However Brendan confesses to Lynsey that she might be right about Silas and tells her that he saw Silas watching her as she left. Brendan then helps Lynsey and Cheryl with their friendship. Silas however keeps on breaking into the flat and keeps messing with Lynsey's mind. So Brendan confronts Silas and threatens to kill him if he ever goes near Lynsey again.

After confronting Silas, Brendan tells Ste to go and keep an eye on Lynsey. Rae is not happy by the way Brendan bosses around Ste. She calls Brendan selfish and a bully. Brendan then grabs Rae's arm and tells her to stay away from him. Silas then helps Rae by telling her she should stand up to Brendan more often, but really he is after revenge on Brendan after his threat. Rae then goes to Lynsey's flat and yells at Ste, accidentally admitting Brendan is gay in front of his son Declan. Brendan then confesses to his son that he is gay and that is why he left his mother. Declan however, takes the news well and the pair hug. But Brendan goes after Rae and puts his hands on her throat and tells her to stay away from Declan and his family, or he will kill her.

Rae is murdered by Silas and her body is planted in Brendan's car boot. Silas leaves a note on the car telling Brendan to go to the woods, and Brendan assumes this note is from Lynsey, who earlier told him she was meeting someone from an online chatroom. He then goes to the woods to look for her, but she is not there. A phone rings in the boot of the car, and Brendan opens the boot to find Rae's dead body. At that moment, the police arrive and arrest Brendan, having been tipped off by Silas and suspecting Brendan of Rae's murder and the murders of India Longford and Rebecca Massey previously. He is put in prison and refused bail. He is then visited by Cheryl and Warren, who say they will find a way to show the police that he is innocent. Lynsey tries to show the police her online chat with the stranger, but the stranger's account has been deleted. Warren visits Brendan in prison and threatens Brendan to try to get him to sign over his share of the club. When Brendan refuses to hand over his part of the club, Warren orders his friends inside to beat Brendan up. However even after this, Brendan refused to hand over his share of the club. Later, during Halloween, Silas is finally exposed for his crimes after accidentally killing his own daughter Heidi Costello who he mistakes for Lynsey and is later jailed. The next week in the aftermath of the events Cheryl visits Brendan in Prison where he comes out bruised and battered by cellmates under contract with Warren.

After Brendan is released, he meets Warren's long lost son Joel. Joel lives with Warren and Mitzeee. When Mitzeee worries about the fact that Warren murdered his ex-wife, she turns to Brendan for comfort and together they hatch a plan to rid of Warren once and for all. A month later, Warren proposes to Mitzeee. When Warren discovers that she and Brendan had been plotting against him, he decides that he and Mitzeee should elope. Warren soon kidnaps Mitzeee and takes her to the place that he buried his ex-wife. He forces her to dig her own grave. Brendan takes Joel to rescue Mitzeee when in the car Joel pulls a gun on Brendan. When Brendan reaches Mitzeee and Warren, he tells Warren that he murdered Joel. They fight for the gun before Joel appears and knocks Warren out, revealing that he wasn't killed. The police arrive and arrest Warren.

Three months later, Joel returns to the village and reveals that Warren sold him his half of the club, much to Brendan's anger. Joel and Brendan battle for weeks until Brendan decides to take him under his wing as an apprentice. Over the next few weeks Brendan orders Joel to stay and live with him. When Brendan witnesses an encounter between Ste and Joel, resulting in a push and a broken bottle of wine, he is reminded how much he cares for Ste still. He offers to give Ste and Doug a business loan for a deli. After being rejected by Ste, Doug agrees after much persuasion. Later, finding out what had happened, Ste fakes getting back with Brendan so he can sign over the business over to him and stay with Doug. When Walker (an old cellmate) returns from prison, trouble comes with him. Brendan offered him a bed for the night, Walker takes it. Cheryl confronts him about the stash of money under his bed. Brendan kicks him out and concentrates on keeping Joel, Cheryl and Lynsey safe. When Walker returns later on, it results in Joel being stabbed and Brendan beating up Sampson. Joel eventually forgives Brendan and the two's relationship is on the up side.

A few weeks later Mitzeee turns up on his door step crying and shaking. Brendan is oblivious to what has happened. When Lynsey rings him and tells him about Mercedes he beckons Mitzeee to his car. Aware that the police are watching them, Mitzeee screams at Brendan to drive but Brendan tells her that she will not be able to live with the guilt and hands her over to the police. A week later Brendan receives a call from Sampson explaining that Joel is in a white van with a hand grenade tied to his hands. Walker and he rescue Joel and discover that the hand grenade was fake. When Brendan arrives at Chez Chez to find it trashed by Samson he clashes with Walker. He races home to find a dead Lynsey lying on the sofa. He swoops her up and lifts her into the middle of the village. Cheryl spots her brother carrying a lifeless Lynsey and carefully placing her in the middle of the road. Cheryl screams over her body, while Brendan is still in shock, assuming that Sampson murdered Lynsey. He is later questioned by the police.

Brendan takes Cheryl to Ireland in an attempt to keep her safe. He returns when Walker reports that Sampson has trashed the club again. After Cheryl comes back, he confesses to her that he Sampson murdered Lynsey and she stops speaking to him. A week later, Brendan takes Samson's right-hand man hostage and finds out that Sampson is planning a million pound drug deal. He and Walker plan a drug heist for the next three weeks. A few days before the heist, Brendan's son Declan returns. When Walker and Brendan perform the heist, it all goes wrong and they only just escape the police after Walker shoots a cop.

At the beginning of September 2012, Brendan witnesses Joel's stepfather, Mick, beating up Joel, and Brendan encourages Joel to take the power back. They follow Mick to Southport, where they dangle him off a lighthouse. They did not mean to cause Mick any harm, but Joel's will to save Brendan from a grappling Mick causes Joel to push Mick off the lighthouse to his presumed death. Brendan then meets Cheryl and his Nana in Southport, and learns that his Nana is dying. She wants to visit her old holiday home one last time, and this makes Brendan noticeably uneasy. On the night before the journey to the home, Cheryl witnesses Brendan chopping up the definitely dead body of Mick. She is horrified. At the holiday home, Brendan remembers the past there with his father, and it is revealed how he was sexually abused by his father and that his grandmother knew and did nothing. She tries to apologise and asks him if that is the reason he is gay. He replies that no, it's not the reason he's gay. It's the reason he's a freak. They have a heart breaking talk in the garden where he blames her lack of action for his inability to be a father or love anyone. He tells her that she took his children, Ste and his sister away because she did nothing. He is visibly unhinged and when she tries to hug him, he smothers her against his chest, crying over her body afterwards. Brendan's anger causes him to smash up the house, resulting in a leaking gas pipe. Just before the house explodes, Brendan finds out that Walker is a cop. The holiday home explodes and the audience is left wondering whether Brendan is dead or alive.

Brendan survives the explosion, and once partially better, spends his time trying to save his loved ones: Ste, Cheryl and Declan, from the wrath of Walker. In his desperation to save Ste, Brendan jumps in front of a gun, and Walker accidentally shoots into the village and kills Riley. Walker then disappears.

With Doug away in America for Riley's funeral, Ste and Brendan growing increasingly closer. Cheryl suggest they go to a counselor as a last-ditch effort to repair their broken relationship. Brendan is reluctant but goes along with it, looking visibly upset when his childhood is brought up. Cheryl tells the story of how they met when Brendan ran away at her birthday party and stole all the attention on himself. The audience is able to infer from his short replies that he was concerned for her welfare from his father's abuse even at an early age and did it to protect her. He does not share any of this and instead trashes the desk in their second session in an attempt to not talk about it. Brendan realizes he needs to fix himself and leave immediately, moving into a nearby church, focusing on God to fix him. It is a powerful step in his redemption arch. Not long after, he agrees to meet Cheryl in a park and is horrified to find out that Ste is to be married to Doug within the week. Due to the insistence of the priest at the church, he is prepared to reveal his feelings to Ste, but bottles it at the last minute, and allows Ste to go ahead with the wedding. Ste is seriously injured in the bus crash at the wedding, and Brendan rushes to his side when he hears the news. After his trip to the hospital, Brendan turns to God and makes a promise to stay away from Ste, so long as God allows Ste to survive. Ste pulls through, and Brendan is therefore forced to keep his promise.

Ste and Doug try to make it as a married couple but Ste's feelings for Brendan are still obvious. When Doug's parents return for a visit from America they make the shocking confession that Doug's father is ill. Ste and Doug pack up to move to America but not before Ste visits Chez Chez and tells Brendan to ask him to stay. The pair kiss but Brendan pushes Ste away and punches him, later telling Cheryl it was because of his pact to God to stay away from Ste and the only way to make Ste move on. Brendan then leaves Hollyoaks and heads to Dublin. Cheryl tries to convince Ste his heart lies with Brendan but ends up accidentally telling Doug. When at the airport ready to depart to America Doug hands Ste a ticket to go to Dublin instead and the pair say an emotional goodbye after Doug admits to not wanting to be 'second best' to Brendan who is who Ste truly loves.

In Dublin Brendan is unable to spend time with his family, who tell him they want nothing to do with him at the train station. He bumps into John Paul McQueen (James Sutton) who recently broke up with boyfriend Craig Dean (Guy Burnet). The two are seen talking in a pub after Brendan buys John Paul a drink. Later when Ste arrive in Dublin and at Brendan's hotel room - he walks in on John Paul and Brendan after they have sex. Angry and humiliated he storms off but not before arguing with Brendan about why they are not together. Forced to let him go because of his promise to God, heart-broken Brendan watches Ste leave insisting that Brendan 'never has to see him again'.

Later that night, after a phone call from Cheryl insisting that Brendan run after Ste Brendan bumps into a nun. She convinces him that God would forgive him for breaking his promise and Brendan leaves to find Steven. The two finally reunite on ha'penny Bridge where Brendan finally tells Ste the truth about why he's been staying away from him and the two share mutual "I love you"'s and their reunion kiss. They finally go back to Brendan's hotel room in Dublin.

The next morning Brendan shows Ste around Dublin before the pair arrive at Brendan's dad's old pub. Ste helps pull Brendan out of the dark place the memories of the pub put him in and the pair end up trashing the pub before having sex in it. Once back in Hollyoaks, they're greeted by a happy Cheryl. Unfortunately, their happiness is short lived as Brendan's evil father Seamus Brady (Fintan McKeown) who abused him as a child arrives at the Bradys' front door step. Haunted by his father Brendan tries to push Ste away but the pair make it through as Ste insists that Brendan is changing that he will never give up on him. Ste and Brendan then spend Christmas and New Years together with Ste's children Leah and Lucas as Brendan tries to forget about his dad. Seamus decides to stay in the village however and after finding out from Joel that Brendan is gay and in a relationship with Ste he torments Brendan about it until Brendan comes to the decision to have his father murdered.

Brendan offers to buy Joel out of his half of the club if Joel kills Seamus to which Joel eventually begrudgingly agrees. He hits Seamus over the head with a baseball bat and then drags him into an abandoned shed which he sets fire to. At first Brendan is finally at peace with the knowledge that his father is gone but unfortunately Joel's not a very good murderer. As Joel didn't hit him several times with the base ball bat or setting fire to the body instead of the shed Seamus survived. Brendan then punched Joel as revenge and took back the money.

Ste makes Brendan promise that all of his dark side, such as the people after him or the trail of bodies is over. After Joel tries to steal Brendan's money back instead of hurt or kill him, Brendan honors his promise to Ste and lets Joel run away instead. He then sets about building a life with Ste, helping him look after his kids and developing a strong relationship with them to the point where Ste's daughter Leah calls him "daddy Brendan". Brendan's father however is still a looming presence over their relationship, making several jibs to Brendan regarding his sexuality and emasculation him by calling him 'Brenda'. Ste and Brendan's relationship is tested several times during the next week but they pull through. Doug comes back from America much to Brendan's dismay and would like to continue a working relation with Ste in the deli as well as see Leah and Lucas - to which Ste agrees. With Doug and his father both causing him to melt-down Brendan confides in Mitzeee about his childhood abuse from his father. The former glamour-girl advises him to tell Ste about it or else he'll never get over his past. Ready and intent to tell Ste all about his past Ste turns up at the Hays but overhears a Ste telling Leah that Amy must never know that Brendan and Ste are now together. Distraught, Brendan goes slightly off the rails. Ste and Brendan fight, and Ste tells Brendan that he will not choose between him and his kids because Brendan will lose. Later, Brendan ensures that the position of a new barman goes to a hot new guy before preparing to seduce him. Mitzeee quickly makes him see sense before he is able to go through with it and Brendan goes to the deli to make up with Ste.

The pair quickly reunite and Ste inadvertently stops Brendan from telling him about his childhood trauma. Seamus continues being a burden to their relationship though and Ste tells Brendan that he must sort out that relationship. Brendan decides that he doesn't want to stay in the house with Seamus anymore and moves out of his Cheryl's flat. He turns up to Ste's with a bag in hand and the pair move in together. It is later shown that new barman Kevin is in fact working for Walker who is back and set to take revenge on Brendan. He is shown with a beard and going through pictures of Brendan, Ste and Seamus in his home, an abandoned trailer beneath an overpass. After failed attempts to put Brendan away, Kevin is eventually beat up by Walker and forced to accuse Brendan of sexual assault, causing Brendan to be arrested and most of Hollyoaks to turn against him. Maxine Minniver (Nikki Sanderson), sister of Mitzeee, who Kevin lives with soon discovers that Walker is back, at which point he orders Kevin to kill her. But instead, he continually drugs Maxine and keeps her hidden in their apartment. Eventually, Walker finds out she is still alive and gets Kevin to help him kidnap her and take her to his home. After the first day in court for Brendan's alleged sexual abuse, a depressed Brendan shows up drunk at his sisters engagement party. After being kicked out, Ste tries to take him home when Brendan accuses him of believing he abused Kevin. Ste then lashes out at Brendan and tells him he is just like his father, oblivious to the childhood sexual abuse. Seeing red, Brendan beats Ste five times. When Ste runs away, Maxine bumps into Brendan after Kevin helps her escape from Walker, and tells him that Walker's back.

This takes us into Brendan's final week, also known as Brendan's last dance. Fueled by panic and love, Brendan gets Cheryl into a car and drives her away. During the ride they bump into Ste, at which point Brendan admits to beating him. They take Ste back to his apartment, when he escapes. Brendan goes looking for him and, outside the deli, proclaims his pain and undying love to Ste. He takes him back to the flat, where Cheryl, Ste and Brendan prepare to leave. CHeryl says she won't leave without her father. Brendan goes back to his flat to find Seamus where he finds him tied up with Walker standing over him with a gun.

Walker ties Brendan up with Seamus while he captures Ste and Cheryl, trapping them in his trailer with a limited oxygen supply. When he returns, he forces Brendan to open up about the childhood abuse. He gives Brendan a steel pipe and tells him to kill his father. When Brendan goes to, Seamus apologizes for everything he did. After that, Brendan feels he can't kill him and attacks Walker. Walker escapes and is apprehended by the police. Cheryl and Ste are found by Nate and Darren and Brendan feels he's made progress with his father. Walker, however, escapes the squad car. The next day, the police tell the Bradys that Walker has escaped. Brendan then visits his trailer and sets it alight. Walker, at the graveyard visiting his brother, is found by Texas. He sends her back to Hollyoaks with a message for Brendan to meet him at the church. Brendan finds him on his bike and a car chase ensues. Walker abandons the bike near a viaduct, where Brendan and he fight. Brendan pushes Walker into a moving train, instantly killing him.

In Brendan's final episodes he is finally able to open up to Ste about the abuse from Seamus. Seamus confronts Brendan in the club and tries to attack him. As he looms over Brendan cowering on the floor, Cheryl shoots him. Brendan convinces Cheryl to claim it was Brendan that fired the gun, he exits the club onto the balcony where he is surrounded by armed police. He raises the gun toward them in an attempt at suicide.

Cheryl then notices that the bullets are in her hand and screams to him that the gun isn't loaded. Ste then tries to push past police. Brendan then mutters to himself "In the next life, Steven." He then shuts the door to Cheryl and pulls his gun on police, meaning to be shot dead by police snipers. In the final episode, it is revealed that, while he was shot, it wasn't lethal and is seen in hospital. He and Ste talk before the police drag Brendan away. He tells Ste that he changed everything. Brendan is then escorted to prison.

== Reception ==
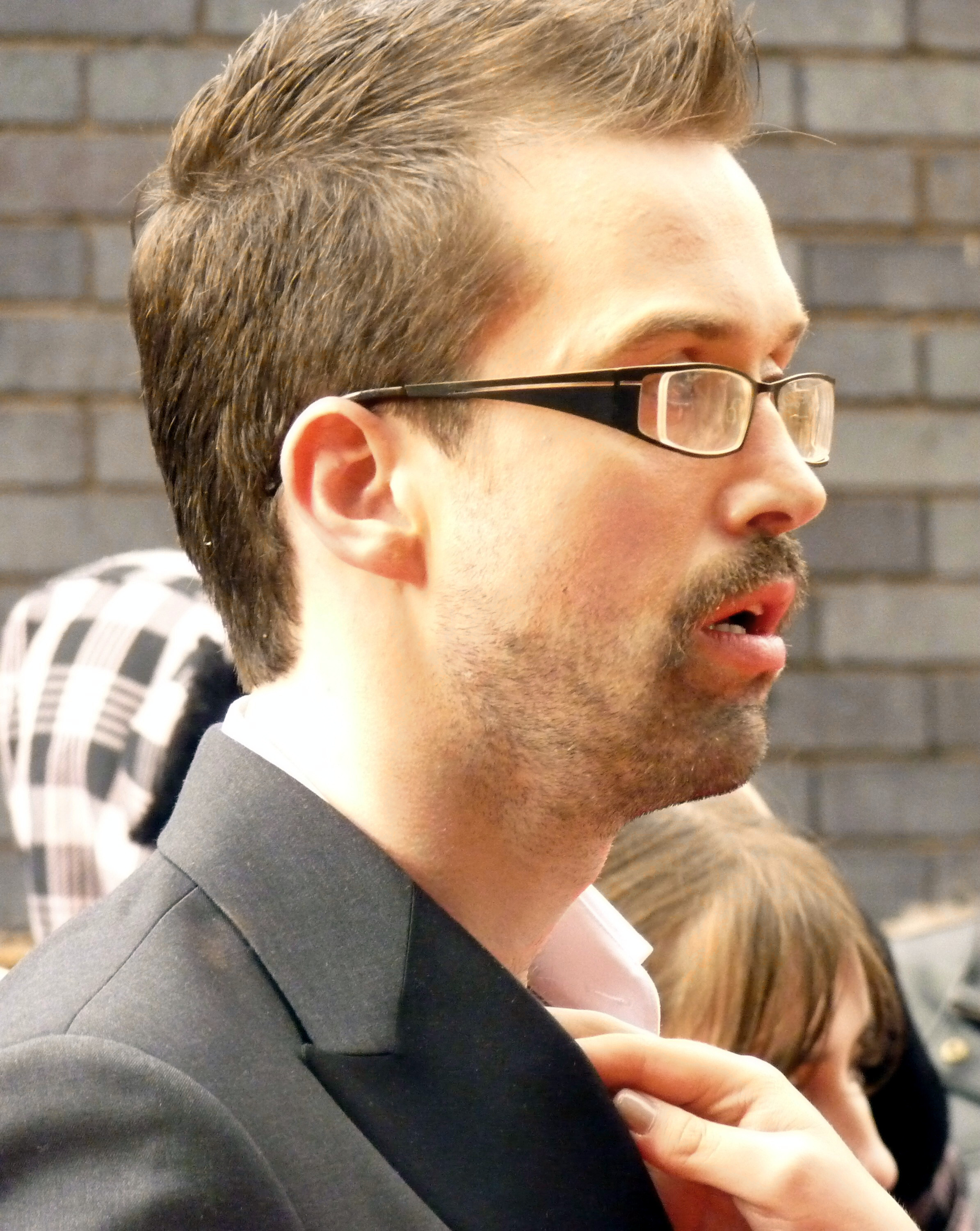
Emmett J. Scanlan (pictured) has been nominated for several awards for his portrayal of Brendan.

Only one month after his first appearance on Hollyoaks, Emmett J. Scanlan was nominated for the award of 'Best Newcomer' at the 2011 National Television Awards, but did not make the shortlist. Scanlan was nominated in the categories of "Best Actor" and Brendan for "Villain of the Year" at the 2011 British Soap Awards as well as "Best Newcomer" and "Best Onscreen Partnership" with Kieron Richardson. He went on to win "Best Newcomer" and "Villain of the Year". At the 2012 British Soap Awards he was nominated for "Best Actor" and "Villain of the Year". He went on to win the "Best Actor" award. At the All About Soap Bubble Awards Brendan, Ste and Rae won the award for "Best Love Triangle". Scanlan won "Best Newcomer" at the 2011 Inside Soap Awards. He was nominated in the category of "Serial Drama Performance" at the 2012 National Television Awards. He later received a "Best Actor" nomination at the 2012 TV Choice Awards. Scanlan was then nominated for "Best Actor", "Funniest Male" and "Best Bad Boy" at the 2012 Inside Soap Awards. On Digital Spy's 2012 end of year reader poll, Scanlan won "Best Male Soap Actor" and received 22.0% of the vote. At the 2013 National Television Awards Scanlan was nominated in the category of "Serial Drama Performance".

A writer for the gay blog and news website AfterElton.com expressed his shock at the scene featuring Brendan hitting Ste and also called the story "compelling". He said, "I must say that even though I've been following this storyline since it began, and I knew what was coming, seeing Brendan hit Ste was quite shocking… and the storyline is just beginning. The show has said it's going to be a dark, long-running story arc so I can only imagine what's ahead. I admit that I find the storyline quite compelling, and I've been drawn into it. While some people have seen this as a romance, it's never played that way to me. Ste and Brendan's scenes do have an element of sexual allure since the actors have chemistry, but there's too much darkness and manipulation on the edges of every scene to make real romance even possible. He also gave credit to the show for its slow build up over a few months.

Inside Soap writer Laura-Jayne Tyler also praised Scanlan's character: "Ever since the moustache-twitching rogue rocked up in Chester, he's been pure dynamite. His criminal antics are so dodgy that I'm sure he's going to put the likes of Dirty Den to shame, and the gay domestic abuse plot involving him and Ste has got to be the biggest love shock of the year."

Ruth Deller of lowculture.co.uk listed Brendan as her favourite character of soap opera during the second half of 2010. She also commented on him, stating: "Twirling his comedy evil moustache, turning Ste into his sex slave, randomly bullying the weakest residents of the village just because he can, Brendan has made our forum users come over all unnecessary."

== See also ==
- List of Hollyoaks characters (2010)
- List of LGBT characters in soap operas
- List of soap opera villains
