= Sinead O'Connor (Hollyoaks) =

Fictional character from Hollyoaks

- Hollyoaks character
- Portrayed by: Stephanie Davis
- Duration: 2010–2015, 2018–2019
- First appearance: Episode 2898; 1 September 2010
- Last appearance: Episode 5259; 19 September 2019
- Introduced by: Paul Marquess (2010); Bryan Kirkwood (2018)
- Spin-off appearances: Hollyoaks Later (2012)
In-universe information
- Other names: Sinead Roscoe; Sinead Shelby
- Occupation: Student; Shop assistant; Drug dealer; Barmaid; Cleaner; Prostitute; Waitress; Nurse
- Father: Rob O'Connor
- Mother: Morag Fairhurst
- Adoptive mother: Diane Hutchinson
- Stepfather: Tony Hutchinson
- Brothers: Finn O'Connor
- Half-brothers: Anthony Hutchinson (adoptive)
- Half-sisters: Olivia O'Connor; Dee Dee Hutchinson (adoptive); Rose Lomax (adoptive); Eva Hutchinson (adoptive)
- Husband: Freddie Roscoe (2014–2015); Laurie Shelby (2018–2019)
- Daughters: Katy O'Connor; Hannah Hay-O'Connor
- Nieces: Bella Sharpe
- First cousins: Scott Drinkwell (adoptive); Lily Drinkwell (adoptive)

Sinead O'Connor (also Shelby and Roscoe) is a fictional character from the British Channel 4 soap opera, Hollyoaks, played by Stephanie Davis. The character first appeared during the episode broadcast on 1 September 2010. Sinead is a member of the O'Connor family, who were introduced as part of a cast turnover. Producers devised a "Romeo and Juliet" pairing for Sinead and Bart McQueen (Jonny Clarke).

Davis was fired from the show in July 2015 after poor behaviour on-set and Sinead departed during the episode broadcast on 18 September 2015. Davis's reintroduction was announced in May 2018, and the character returned on 23 October that year. In November 2019, Davis announced that she had decided to take a break from the show, having made her last appearance on 18 September of the same year. Nine months later, Davis announced on 15 June 2020 that she had opted to not return to the show following the break.

== Creation and casting ==
In 2010, Davis appeared as a contestant on BBC talent contest Over the Rainbow. When she departed the competition Hollyoaks contacted her agent requesting that she audition for the show. Davis gave up her pursuit of stage work to star as Sinead. She later told Dawn Collinson from the Liverpool Echo that "I definitely, 100% made the right decision, it’s Hollyoaks all the way". Sinead was created during producer Paul Marquess's "radical makeover" of Hollyoaks. Marquess first mentioned the family during a May 2010 interview with Kris Green from Digital Spy. He revealed that "something shocking happens to them really early on".

Davis's casting was publicised in June 2010, alongside the announcement of the O'Connor family. Green reported that Davis was joined by Gary Cargill and Alex Fletcher playing Sinead's father Rob and stepmother Diane O'Connor respectively, while the role of sibling Finn O'Connor had been given to Connor Wilkinson. Green added that the family would be under threat from Diane's desire to conceive a child via IVF. Marquess was excited about the family because they would bring a "dramatic storyline" to the show.

== Development ==
In July 2012, Hollyoaks teamed up with L'Oréal Paris to promote their "Feria hair colour" brand and in exchange give Sinead a make-over. The cosmetic company announced the news via their website stating that they had transformed Sinéad's hair "from glossy brunette into fiery red". The character was shown wanting a new look prior to a trip to Abersoch to "give herself an extra boost of confidence". Hollyoaks also released a video to profile Davis having the treatment applied to her hair.

Davis later told a reporter from K9 magazine that she liked Sinéad's "feisty nature" but felt she became quieter in 2012.

Sinead begins a romance with Bart McQueen (Jonny Clarke) but Diane does not approve. They decide that the only solution to be together is running away. Davis told Collinson that Diane does not want Bart in Sinead's life so they go to Wales. To begin with they find excitement in staying in a bed and breakfast but "then obviously as time goes on it gets a lot harder". As the money runs out they start struggling. She stated that the only good thing for Bart and Sinead is that they have each other, forming a "Romeo and Juliet" pairing. They take jobs at a fairground but they find themselves in a predicament as they "bicker" but ultimately reconcile due to love. Diane tracks them down and attempts to convince Sinead to return home. Davis explained that the duo have "got no money, they’re hungry, Sinead just wants a bath and to see her friends. It's a cliffhanger whether she goes home and has all those luxuries and doesn’t get to be with Bart, or she stays with nothing."

Davis sympathised with her character because she understood the feeling of wanting to be with someone who may not be suitable. Off-screen she had formed a good rapport with Clarke, claimed to know him "inside out" and therefore did not find their kissing scenes weird to film. She added that extras working on the show believe their on-screen chemistry so much that they suggested they should be together in reality.

=== Departure ===
On 16 July 2015, it was reported by Digital Spy that Stephanie Davis would not be filming any further scenes in her role as Sinead after show bosses decided to terminate her contract. A Hollyoaks spokesperson told Digital Spy: "Stephanie Davis will no longer be filming Hollyoaks. Her contract has been terminated with immediate effect. Her agent later stated that "Stephanie's contract was terminated following warnings for lateness, attendance and after a final incident in which she turned up to set unfit to work because of alcohol consumption". Her final scenes aired on 18 September 2015.

=== Reintroduction ===
On 21 May 2018, it was announced that Davis would reprise her role as Sinead. The character will return in scenes broadcast in October. Davis was excited to return to the soap and looked forward to returning to the process of being in the show. Executive producer Bryan Kirkwood expressed his delight at Davis's return and called Sinead "a brilliant and vibrant character who the audience love". Justin Harp from Digital Spy called her return "perhaps the most surprising soap casting of the year thus far".

== Reception ==
For her portrayal of Sinead, Davis received a "Serial Drama Performance" nomination at the 2012 National Television Awards. She was also nominated for the "Sexiest Female" award in the British Soap Awards but lost out to Michelle Keegan of Coronation Street. In 2014, Davis was nominated for the "Best Actress" award and "Best Dramatic Performance" at The British Soap Awards for her portrayal of Sinead.

Justin Harp from Digital Spy called the news of Sinead's reintroduction "the most surprising soap casting of the year". In 2023, Stephen Patterson from Metro wrote that Sinead featured in "some truly harrowing and compelling storylines" across her two stints, calling Davis a "soap icon" who turned "in some truly spectacular and award-worthy performances".
