= Jon Lolis =

Albanian-Greek actor

Jon or Leonidas Lolis is an actor who is most noted for his role of Aleksander Malota in British Channel 4 soap Hollyoaks. He played the estranged husband of Jacqui McQueen who fell in love with her younger sister Carmel.

Jon made his TV debut in the 6-part BBC1 drama Rough Diamond in which he played bad boy JP.

After Hollyoaks he went on to star as a regular in a new soap called The Royal Today, a modern-day spin-off of The Royal broadcast on ITV in 2008. He played porter Kristaps on the show. The same year saw the character of Aleksander return on Hollyoaks for a brief storyline.

In 2009, Jon was a guest star on prime time hospital drama Casualty (BBC1). He played Bluto, the rebellious brother of a Serbian contractor. He then went on to lead the cast of a new pilot comedy called The 370 playing Pavel, the driver of the bus in which the comedy was set in. Jon's next role was in the critically acclaimed 6-part drama Casualty 1909, in which he played Stepanovs, a translator employed by the police.

Jon's next project saw the actor star as Sgt Josef František in Channel 4's 2010 miniseries Bloody Foreigners, exploring the part played by immigrant communities in key events of British history; the episode focussed on the achievements of an elite group of Polish pilots during the Battle of Britain. Since then, he has acted in 2 episodes of Emmerdale and as a Czech soldier in Home Fires before appearing in an episode of the BBC 2018 adaptation of China Miéville's The City & the City.

He grew up in Greece. He studied at the Liverpool Institute for Performing Arts.
