= Bart McQueen =

Fictional character from Hollyoaks

- Hollyoaks character
- Portrayed by: Jonny Clarke
- Duration: 2010–2013, 2017
- First appearance: 4 August 2010
- Last appearance: 15 May 2017
- Introduced by: Paul Marquess (2010); Bryan Kirkwood (2017)
- Spin-off appearances: Hollyoaks Later (2010, 2012)
In-universe information
- Occupation: Student; Cleaner
- Family: McQueen
- Father: Victor McQueen
- Mother: Sarah
- Stepmother: Joan McQueen
- Grandmothers: Marguerite McQueen
- Aunts: Breda McQueen; Valene McQueen
- First cousins: Goldie McQueen; Sylver McQueen (adoptive)
- Other relatives: Marlena McQueen; Kathleen McQueen; Myra McQueen; Jacqui McQueen; Mercedes McQueen; Carmel McQueen; Michaela McQueen; Theresa McQueen; John Paul McQueen; Max McQueen; Kathleen-Angel McQueen; Bobby Costello; Matthew McQueen; Porsche McQueen; Celine McQueen; Cleo McQueen; Hunter McQueen; Prince McQueen; Carmina McQueen

Bart McQueen is a fictional character from the British Channel 4 soap opera Hollyoaks, played by Jonny Clarke. He first appeared onscreen at his stepmother's funeral in August 2010, introduced by producer Paul Marquess as a member of the McQueen family. During his time on the show, Bart had been involved in: relationships with Jason Costello (Victoria Atkin) and Sinead O'Connor (Stephanie Davis), being stabbed during the third series of Hollyoaks Later, his involvement in Esther Bloom's (Jazmine Franks) bullying storyline, causing the bus crash featuring in the notable Enjoy the Ride storyline, and falling off the rails with a growing cannabis habit.

Clarke and Andrew Still (who plays Joel Dexter) left their roles in December 2012, but their departures remained unannounced until the episode aired. They left on 9 January 2013 when their characters went on the run. Bart's reintroduction was announced on 26 January 2017 and Clarke expressed his delight at reprising the role. Bart returned on 13 February 2017 and departed on 13 April 2017, at the conclusion of the guest stint.

== Character creation ==
Details of the character first came to attention during an interview with producer Paul Marquess in April 2010. Marquess introduced several new characters in 2010 when he took over from Lucy Allan as series producer. Speculation grew over the McQueen family, due to the axing of many other characters. However, Marquess stated: "They're definitely staying! In fact, we're bringing in a new McQueen, who will change the dynamic of the family quite considerably.

In another interview, Marquess revealed that the character was named after Bart Simpson, the mischievous character from American cartoon The Simpsons and also described him as a "ladies' man". It was announced in June 2010 that Jonny Clarke had been cast as Bart. This was also announced at the same time as fellow characters Brendan Brady and Lynsey Nolan. Paul Marquess spoke of the characters' introductions, saying: "This is a really exciting time for Hollyoaks and Brendan, Lynsey and Bart bring more fun, drama and sexiness to the show." Clarke has described Bart as a "lad's lad". Clarke revealed in July 2012 that he plans to be a rock star if his career in Hollyoaks fails.

== Development ==
In April 2012, Bart becomes involved with "bad boy" Joel Dexter (Andrew Still) and he forces Bart to grow cannabis plants. Clarke told a writer from Inside Soap that he is forced to show his girlfriend Sinead O'Connor (Stephanie Davis) what he is up to. Sinead is angered by his involvement; while Bart himself realises that he is out of his depth. Clarke explained that his character does not know what he has agreed to do. When the plants arrive; Bart "puts on a front" and pretends to be "completely cool" with the situation. However, he is left feeling "unnerved" and faces the prospect of Myra discovering the truth when his usage of heat lamps cause her electricity bill to rise.

The police later discover Bart's cannabis farm and arrest most of the McQueen family. However, Bart does not attempt to clear their name and asks Sinead to run away with him.

=== Departure ===
The first look airing of the episode airing on 8 January 2013 saw Bart and Joel Dexter (Andrew Still) go on the run from Brendan Brady (Emmett J. Scanlan) after he threatened both of them, but not before Bart said a final farewell to Sinead. The episode also saw Esther Bloom (Jazmine Franks) change her statement, which now left Bart in danger with the police. Clarke had filmed his final scenes in December 2012, after three years with the show. Clarke commented on his departure: "Hollyoaks has been a great stepping stone in my career, and leaving the show is one of the hardest decisions I've had to make so far. I believe I am at a great age to progress my career further. I am excited to see what the future brings. I hope to be involved in films and some period dramas. I would like to thank my family for their support and would also like to thank all my fans for all the great comments and good wishes they have sent me for my future career."

=== Return ===
On 26 January 2017, it was announced that Clarke had reprised the role. His character will return alongside Nana McQueen (Diane Langton) for Celine McQueen's (Sarah George) funeral. Teasing Bart's new storylines, Clarke said "I'm so happy to be back at Hollyoaks. I can't wait for people to see the way Bart has changed since the last time he was in the village. He's definitely going to ruffle a few feathers with a sinister secret!" Bart returned on 13 February 2017. Bart made a previously unannounced departure from the show on 14 April 2017 when he was murdered by Warren Fox (Jamie Lomas).

== Storylines ==
Bart first appears at his stepmother's funeral, where he meets Myra McQueen (Nicole Barber-Lane) and his second cousins Michaela McQueen (Hollie-Jay Bowes) and Theresa McQueen (Jorgie Porter). After the funeral, Bart is caught shoplifting by policeman Dominic Reilly (John Pickard), and is brought back to the McQueen's home. Bart shocks Myra by revealing he has shoplifted before, has an anti-social behaviour order, burnt a school down – although not proven guilty – and other misdemeanours. Dominic is about to have Bart taken into custody, when Myra agrees to look after him, as Bart has no one to look after him. She immediately warns Bart not to get up to any trouble. After a day at the McQueens, Bart is roped into helping Carmel McQueen (Gemma Merna) at beauty salon Evissa. Heidi Costello (Kim Tiddy) arrives with her daughter Jasmine Costello (Victoria Atkin), who seems to dislike the idea of having a makeover. Bart strikes up a friendship with Jasmine. He then steals money from the till. Although Jasmine tells him to put it back, he does not, and is not seen by Carmel. Bart spends a day with Jasmine, but she runs off after he kisses her. When her father Carl Costello (Paul Opacic) is told about them from Mitzeee (Rachel Shenton), he is angry and confronts them both and Jasmine's half-sister Jem Costello (Helen Russell-Clark) interrupts, but defends them both that they have done nothing wrong. Bart becomes friends with Taylor Sharpe (Shaun Blackstock), and they plan to throw a party at the McQueen house. Duncan Button (Dean Aspen) agrees to bring alcohol to the party, but instead posts details of the party online. The McQueen house is trashed and Bart steals money. This causes an angry confrontation from Jacqui McQueen (Claire Cooper), who accuses Bart of stealing the money. However, Myra does not believe Jacqui's accusations. Jacqui then raids Bart's room, which annoys Myra, who tells Jacqui to calm down. After an argument, when Myra refuses to take Jacqui's side, Jacqui moves out. Bart, to his glee, tries to impress Jasmine with how he stole the money, however she is not impressed.

Bart and Jasmine begin a relationship, but he suspects Jasmine of cheating when he discovers Mark (Daniel Gallagher) has Jasmine's number, unaware of her gender identity disorder. Fern (Amber Gavin) convinces Bart that Mark got Jasmine's number and Jasmine's brother Seth Costello (Miles Higson) confused. After Fern hassles Jasmine, Bart throws her out. Fern tells Bart that Jasmine wants to take their relationship a step further. However, when Bart suggests having sex, Jasmine runs off. Jasmine, dressed as Jason, attacks Fern, and is warned off by Bart. Later, Bart decides to confront Jason. Fern and her friends arrive as Bart leaves, and they reveal a knife. However, Bart returns and tackles Fern to the floor, as she accidentally stabs him. She then runs off with her friends. Malachy Fisher (Glen Wallace) and Bart's cousin Mercedes McQueen (Jennifer Metcalfe) see Bart and rush to help as Jasmine also flees the area. Fern visits Bart in hospital and he reveals he cannot remember what happened. Fern uses this to her advantage and tells him that Jason stabbed him. When Jasmine visits Bart, he tells her he knows she is Jason. Jasmine tells him she is a boy. Confused, Bart tells her to leave. After being released from hospital, Bart and Anita Roy (Saira Choudhry) discuss Jason. They later begin to undress themselves and kiss in a cupboard at school, but are caught by Anita's mother, Eva Strong (Sheree Murphy).

Bart meets up with Jasmine as a Jason they have a heart to heart and almost kiss; however are caught by Dom. Jason runs off and Bart begins to wind up Dominic about Amber Sharpe (Lydia Lloyd-Henry) to stop Dominic telling anyone about him kissing Jason. Bart makes Dominic believe he has put pictures of Amber on Dominic's laptop. With the laptop locked inside restaurant Il Gnosh, Dominic sets fire to the place, killing Malachy and Steph Roach (Carley Stenson). Everyone begins to blame Bart for Dominic for torching the place. Jasmine stands by Bart and they get close once again with Bart encouraging her to come out. Bart and Jasmine go to the police about Fern stabbing Bart, leading Fern to reveal Jasmine's secret. Meanwhile, Bart makes peace with Jacqui to protect Theresa from her mother Kathleen (Alison Burrows). When Jason comes out to his family, Bart catches Jason cutting himself and agrees to run away with him. Bart admits he loves Jason and they kiss. The next morning Bart realises he only loves Jasmine not Jason he becomes nasty towards him and runs away. In an attempt to make Bart realise what Jason is going through Anita puts make up on Bart. Carmel catches them and starts to think Bart is transgender. Bart becomes godfather to Theresa's daughter, Kathleen-Angel McQueen.

Bart puts the record straight and tells the McQueen's that Jasmine is transgender not him. Bart goes to see Jason to apologise and they end up kissing again but are caught by Seth. Bart starts bullying Jason is school to fit in. Bart begins flirting with Ruby Button (Anna Shaffer) and takes her joy riding to impress her, however Jason walks in front of the car. When Bart realises that Jason deliberately stepped into the road he cools things off with Ruby and agrees to support Jason as a friend. Bart gets a part-time as a cleaner in Cinergy Spa. Bart remains close with Jason and it is clear Jason still wants to be with him Bart nearly kisses Jason but starts a relationship with Sinead O'Connor (Stephanie Davis). Myra and Sinead's stepmother, Diane O'Connor (Alex Fletcher), try to stop Sinead and Bart seeing each other so Bart runs away with Sinead. However, when they begin to run short on money, Bart decides to call Jason for some help. Sinead is annoyed about this when Jason turns up. They find an empty farm house, and Jason tells Sinead that Bart loves him not her, and she runs away. Bart and Jason are left in the house when the owner comes home and throws them in a basement, threatening them with a hunter's gun. In an attempt to leave, Bart is pushed to floor and gets a head injury. Jason, thinking he is unconscious, admits his love for him, and Bart tells Jason the same. They kiss again, but Sinead is outside the window and hears all. Bart tries to make it up with Sinead, but is unsuccessful, and the trio return home.

Sinead gets jealous when she sees Bart and Jason talking at school, and claims they can't stay away from each other. Bart is jealous when Sinead starts a relationship with Gaz Bennett (Joel Goonan), and warns her he is bad news. He tries to prove his point by planting stolen goods in Gaz's car to get Gaz arrested. However, the truth about Bart's actions comes to the surface and Sinead is angry at him. During the special episode broadcast on 10 November, "A little thing called love", Jason told Bart to go after Sinead and not to waste another moment. Jason helped Bart and then they deleted their text messages which they had kept from since they were dating and Jason said that they had to move on and say good bye to Jasmine. Bart crashes Wretch 32's gig and sings to Sinead who is watching in the crowd and they get back together. Jason tells Bart that he's leaving to go to America and that they will never see each other again, but Jason said 'I will never forget you Bart Mcqueen' and then they say farewell and Bart waves on Jason as he heads for the airport. Bart then gets involved with Joel Dexter (Andrew Still), after a bad gig night, Joel tells Bart to look after a cannabis farm who stores it in his attic.

This farm is later found, and the whole McQueen family, excluding Michaela and Jacqui, are arrested forcing Bart to go to hospital to visit Joel, where he is threatened by Brendan Brady (Emmett J. Scanlan) who throws coffee at him, narrowly missing him. Bart then later sells the Savage's caravan, and starts stealing equipment from the college, but is found by Jen Gilmore (Amy Downham) who earlier showed belief that Bart could go to art college. Taking sympathy on him she lets him leave, and promises not to tell anyone. Bart (who has been missing from the McQueen household for several days) is later seen by Jacqui in Hollyoaks village. She corners him in an alley where he refuses to mention Brendan or Joel, but does tell her he owes the drug owners £4000. She agrees to let him escape, and he goes to say goodbye to Sinead. He and Sinead promise to always love each other and he leaves. He is later seen waiting for Jacqui to help him escape, but the police are then seen at Sinead's house, making it unclear if Diane or Jacqui have called the police. Sinead runs to tell Bart and convinces him to let her run away with him again.

Bart returns to the village for the funeral of his cousin Celine McQueen (Sarah George). When Celine's sister Cleo McQueen (Nadine Rose Mulkerrin) discovers him with heroin, she orders him to leave. Warren Fox (Jamie Lomas) barges into Bart's squat to find information about the overdose of his sister, Katy Fox (Hannah Tointon), but leaves. When Warren returns, he finds Cleo having an overdose and rushes her to hospital. After Warren pressures him for answers, Joel (now Rory Douglas-Speed) tells Warren that Bart supplied the drugs that killed Katy. Joel warns Bart that Warren is searching for him but Bart threatens to reveal Joel killed Katy so Joel pays Bart to leave the village.

Bart returns and threatens Joel, who offers him support for his drug addiction. As he is leaving, Myra spots him and asks him to stay for her daughter's christening. At the christening reception, Bart steals money from the cards and persuades Cleo to take drugs with him again. However, instead, Cleo reveals that Bart is addicted to drugs and stole money so Myra alerts the police as Bart runs away. When the police find Bart, he tries to run but after spotting Warren, he chooses to be arrested. Warren asks his lawyer, James Nightingale (Gregory Finnegan), to secure Bart's freedom and James persuades Myra to retract her allegation so Warren can confront Bart. However, Bart decides to flee the village until Myra asks him to stay with her. Bart decides to be honest with Warren and post him a letter detailing the events of Katy's death, but Warren opens the door as he is about to post the letter and pulls him inside his flat. Warren later confesses to Sienna Blake (Anna Passey) that he has murdered Bart and Sienna agrees to hide his body. Warren has left Bart's corpse in the empty flat in the building and he and Sienna go to retrieve it. However, the new occupants Sally St. Claire (Annie Wallace) and Neeta Kaur (Amrit Maghera) try to get in so Warren's hides the body in the attic. To get rid of the body Warren pulls the fire alarm and puts the body in his van wrapped in a rug but Joel later takes the van to the funeral of Amy Barnes (Ashley Slanina-Davies) because he has equipment in the van to set up the church but Warren gets there before he can discover Bart's body and when the van does not start, he dumps the body in Amy's grave and the coffin containing Amy's body is buried on top. Joel later discovers that Warren killed Bart and is overwhelmed with guilt for his part in his death.

== Reception ==
Clarke was nominated in the category of "Serial Drama Performance" at the 2012 National Television Awards, for his portrayal of Bart.
