= Paul Marquess =

TV producer from Northern Ireland

- Born: 23 June 1964 (age 61); Belfast, Northern Ireland
- Occupation: Television producer
- Years active: 1996–present
- Television: Hollyoaks; The Bill; Brookside; Family Affairs; Footballers' Wives; Suspects; Hope Street

Paul Marquess (born 23 June 1964) is a television producer from Belfast, Northern Ireland. His credits include Brookside, The Bill, Family Affairs, Hollyoaks, Crime Stories, Suspects and Hope Street. He also originated the idea for the series Footballers' Wives. He currently holds the post of managing director of Newman Street, a label of Fremantlemedia.

== TV career ==
=== Early stages ===
Marquess began his career in 1996, as a storyliner on Coronation Street, before developing and producing various other dramas for Granada television including Revelations from 1996, and Springhill in 1997. In 1999, he landed a job as series producer on Brookside, working alongside Phil Redmond. During that time, Marquess conceived the idea for Footballers' Wives, originally entitled "Cheshire Wives". Marquess felt it lacked a hook until he saw Victoria Beckham on TV.

=== The Bill ===
In 2002, Marquess took over as executive producer of The Bill, with a clear brief from network bosses at ITV to shift the series away from stand-alone episodes to a more serialised format, in an attempt to attract a younger demographic. The move caused controversy amongst many die-hard fans after Marquess fired a number of veteran actors and introduced more sensational storylines, which explored issues such as serial murder, gang rape and domestic violence.

For the first time, the show also focused on the regulars' private lives, including the contentious screening of a gay kiss between two uniformed officers, drug addiction, and corruption within the police service. However, Marquess also remained true to the spirit of The Bill's original 1983 pilot, "Woodentop", returning to an over-the-shoulder filming style. Ratings climbed from 5 million to a regular audience of 8 million, and earned the show a television BAFTA and Rose d'Or nomination in 2003.

In 2005, the show's consistently high ratings led to commercial interest from Channel 5, prompting ITV to offer an unprecedented five-year recommission until 2010, guaranteeing its place in the TV schedules long after Marquess had departed TalkBackThames. It was also during this time that Marquess created The Bill spin-off series MIT: Murder Investigation Team, which ran for two series.

In 2024, Marquess was interviewed about his work on The Bill in a three-part The Bill Podcast interview by Natalie Roles, who played DS Debbie McAllister (2000-2004) one of the few characters introduced by his predecessor Richard Handford who he retained in the series as part of his revamp

=== Family Affairs ===
In 2003, Marquess was promoted to Head of Drama at TalkbackThames and took over as executive producer of Channel 5's tea-time soap, Family Affairs. The show won best storyline at The British Soap Awards in 2005, for the sexual abuse of Chloe Costello by a young family friend, and best dramatic performance for Kazia Pelka. However, ratings remained low and Channel 5 axed it in the same year, saying that the soap had come to the end of its natural lifespan.

=== Hollyoaks ===
In 2010, after a period developing new projects for Endemol and BBC Worldwide, Marquess succeeded Lucy Allan as series producer on Channel 4's teen soap Hollyoaks. Marquess inevitably cemented his reputation as an "axeman" after culling 11 cast members as part of a major revamp. However, he also introduced a raft of new characters, including the show's first mixed-race family and also hired Emmett J. Scanlan to play anti-hero Brendan Brady, who went on to win Best Villain and Best Newcomer at The British Soap Awards the following year.

In 2011, Marquess stood down from Hollyoaks, but stayed on at Lime Pictures to storyline the second series of The Only Way is Essex for ITV2.

=== Crime Stories ===
In 2012, Marquess co-created the police procedural series, Crime Stories (initially entitled "True Crime") with writers Steve Hughes and Darren Fairhurst. The series was made by Marquess' new production company, Newman Street, and was radical in its approach. Although heavily storylined, each episode was entirely unscripted, allowing the actors to improvise the dialogue. Set almost entirely in a police station, Crime Stories was filmed as though a documentary crew were following two CID officers as they investigated a standalone case each week. The show's cast included Jane Antrobus, a recently retired Detective Chief Superintendent from the Greater Manchester Police, in her first screen role to play Detective Inspector Jane Preston, alongside soap actor Ben Hull as sidekick DS Ben Shaw.

Whilst the series received mixed reviews, ratings were consistent at 900,000 viewers per episode, holding well against BBC1 daytime soap, Doctors. However, ITV declined to commission a second series.

=== Suspects ===
The following year, Channel 5 commissioned Newman Street to produce a new police procedural series, the broadcaster's first original drama for eight years. Building on the drama/documentary hybrid format, Suspects was filmed in a less obtrusive fly-on-the wall documentary style than Crime Stories, but still relied on the actors to improvise the dialogue based on a tightly plotted storylines.

The show was shot entirely on location in East London, and starred Fay Ripley, Damien Molony and Clare-Hope Ashitey. The first series (of five episodes) premiered in February 2014 to some critical acclaim though ratings fell from 1.34 million viewers for the first episode to around half a million for the fifth. A second and third series (of four episodes each) were transmitted in August 2014 and January 2015 respectively.

=== London Kills ===
In March 2018, Acorn TV commissioned Marquess to produce a new UK based police procedural to show exclusively on its SVOD platform, the second of its original commissions for the channel. The show was written by Paul Marquess, Sally Tatchell, Sarah Louise Hawkins, Claire Fryer and Jake Riddell and starred Hugo Speer, Sharon Small, Bailey Patrick and Tori Allen Martin. The first series transmitted in February 2019 to favourable reviews. A second series has already been shot and awaits a transmission date. In April 2019, Variety announced that London Kills had been acquired by public service broadcaster BBC to play in its daytime schedule.

=== Hope Street ===
In 2021, serial drama Hope Street, co-created and co-executive produced by Marquess premiered on BBC One Northern Ireland, with eventual broadcasts on BBC One and Britbox. Marquess stated that his aim whilst creating the series was to make a long-running, local drama. Due to being born in Belfast, he wanted to avoid the stereotypes that come with Northern Irish media portrayals, instead focusing on the "humour and warmth" of the area. Marquess and colleague Susan Farrell decided that the series should not focus on serial killers or the Troubles, but instead on the resilience of the community in Northern Ireland. Another of Marquess' aims was to increase the amount of television productions in Northern Ireland, specifically since he had moved from the country to pursue a career in production in his youth. Himself and Farrell created a cast and crew almost entirely formed of local talent from in and around Donaghadee, where the series is filmed. On the Northern Irish BBC iPlayer, Hope Street received 1.6 million streams on the first five episodes of series one. Metro's Stephen Patterson reviewed the serial and gave it a four out of five stars, noting that Marquess had succeeded in his aims for the series.
