= Jonny Clarke =

English actor (born 1992)

- Born: 6 June 1992 (age 34); England, United Kingdom
- Occupation: Actor
- Years active: 2000–present
- Known for: Hollyoaks (2010–2013, 2017); Hollyoaks Later (2010, 2012); Hollyoaks: A Little Film About Love by Jason Costello (2011)

Jonny Clarke (born 6 June 1992) is an English actor. He is best known for playing the character of Bart McQueen in the channel 4 soap opera Hollyoaks.

== Career ==
Jonny Clarke's early roles include two small roles on TV, including the award winning Drama "Seeing Red", and playing lead roles in theatre productions of Guys and Dolls and Oliver.

In early 2010, it was announced that Hollyoaks series producer Allan had stepped down from the position of executive producer of Hollyoaks and that Paul Marquess had taken over the role. It was soon revealed that Marquess planned to give Hollyoaks a "shake up", changing the production's team and beginning a cast cull by axing established characters. As part of Marquess' reinvention he decided to replace the departing character with new ones, and he created the main character of Bart McQueen and cast Jonny Clarke in the role, as part of the "2010 shake-up". First seen on Hollyoaks in August 2010, In September 2011 he was longlisted for best Serial Drama Performance at the 2012 National Television Awards for his part as "Bart McQueen" in Hollyoaks.

In 2013, he was part of the Hollyoaks cast that received a British Soap Award for most spectacular scene.

In November 2013 it was announced that he was to play the part of "Tipper" in the 2014 UK tour of the highly acclaimed WWI drama play Birdsong based on Sebastian Faulks' book of the same name.

Having given up acting for marketing, in 2016 he was invited to return to Hollyoaks to reprise the role of Bart McQueen. Clarke made his last appearance as Bart on the show on 14 April 2017

== Filmography ==
Year	Film	Role	Notes
2000	Seeing Red	Johnny	TV
2010	House of Anubis	Lad	TV
2010–2013, 2017	Hollyoaks	Bart McQueen	series regular, 229 episodes
2010	Hollyoaks Later	Bart McQueen	TV
2011	Hollyoaks: A Little Film About Love by Jason Costello	Bart McQueen	TV Main character
2012	Hollyoaks Later	Bart McQueen	TV
2015	Darkland: Ben Drowned	Steve	Feature Film
