= List of EastEnders characters introduced in 2006 =

EastEnders logo

The following is a list of characters that first appeared in the BBC soap opera EastEnders in 2006, by order of first appearance. 2006 was a year when many families joined EastEnders. First, Deano Wicks (Matt Di Angelo), his sister Carly Wicks (Kellie Shirley) and father Kevin Wicks (Phil Daniels) joined. Then, the Fox family appeared, with the characters of Denise Fox (Diane Parish), Chelsea Fox (Tiana Benjamin/Zaraah Abrahams) and Libby Fox (Belinda Owusu) as members. The Branning family was extended with Max Branning (Jake Wood), Tanya Branning (Jo Joyner), Abi Branning (Lorna Fitzgerald) and Lauren Branning (Madeline Duggan/Jacqueline Jossa) all joining. Also, May Wright (Amanda Drew), Jay Brown (Jamie Borthwick), SJ Fletcher (Natasha Beaumont) and Shirley Carter (Linda Henry), the biological mother of Deano and Carly, all joined the show. Also, Owen Turner (Lee Ross), Denise's abusive ex-husband, and his mother Liz (Kate Williams) both arrived in this year.

== Dean Wicks ==
Dean "Deano" Wicks, played by Matt Di Angelo, arrives in Walford and is taken in by Kevin's in-law Pat Evans (Pam St. Clement) after he lies that his father, Kevin Wicks (Phil Daniels), has died. Deano is soon joined by Kevin and his sister, Carly Wicks (Kellie Shirley). He is also unwittingly reunited with his estranged mother, Shirley Carter (Linda Henry), during a family holiday in Dorset. Deano is imprisoned for framing Sean Slater (Robert Kazinsky) for an assault. He finds prison hard, and when he is released, Deano has changed vastly.

== Bradley Branning ==
Bradley Branning, played by Charlie Clements, moves to Walford from Tring to live with his grandfather Jim (John Bardon) and his step-grandmother Dot (June Brown). Later that year, Bradley's father Max (Jake Wood) moves to Albert Square with his family. Bradley befriends Stacey Slater (Lacey Turner) upon his arrival, and eventually a romance develops between them. They marry in November 2007, but Bradley discovers on Christmas Day that Stacey has been having an affair with his father. They split and Bradley eventually has a relationship with Syd Chambers (Nina Toussaint-White), though it is Stacey who proves to be Bradley's ultimate love.

== Oliver Cousins ==
Oliver Cousins
- EastEnders character
- Portrayed by: Tom Ellis
- First appearance: Episode 3092; 30 January 2006
- Last appearance: Episode 3159; 26 May 2006
- Introduced by: Kate Harwood
In-universe information
- Occupation: General practitioner

Oliver Cousins, played by Tom Ellis, is a Walford doctor. He first appears in episode 3092, first broadcast on 30 January 2006. His last appearance is in episode 3159, first broadcast on 26 May 2006. In 2011, Ellis said he would not consider returning to the show.

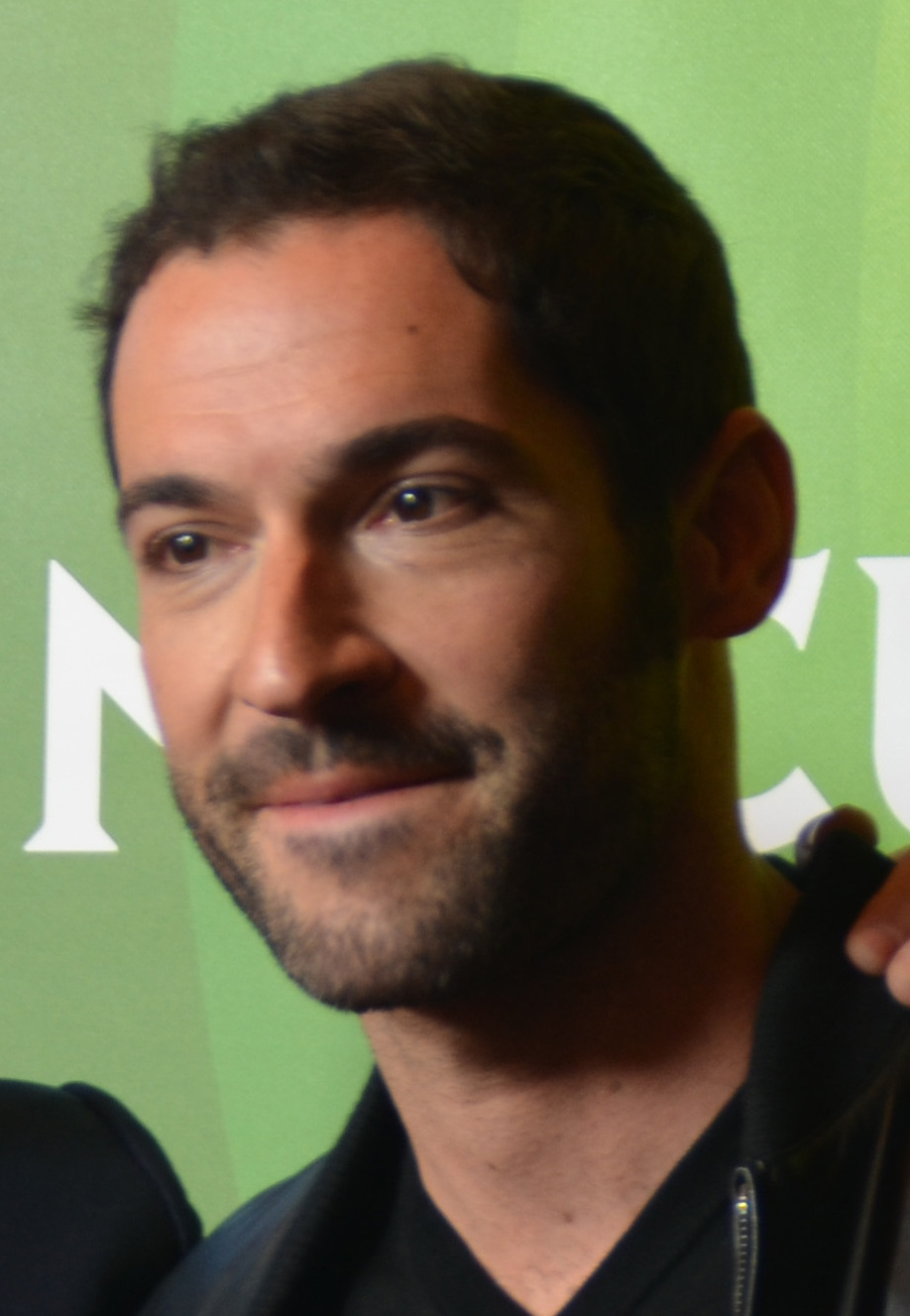
Tom Ellis appeared across four months as GP Oliver Cousins.

When Oliver first appears, he is knocked over by Dot Branning (June Brown) and is locked out of his house naked. Mo Harris (Laila Morse) picks the lock for him, but as his towel is caught in the door, he then has just his hands to cover himself. Cousins gives Honey Edwards (Emma Barton) advice about her unborn baby, finds Ben Mitchell (Charlie Jones) when he runs away, and talks to Little Mo Mitchell (Kacey Ainsworth) about her baby Freddie (Alex Kilby and Tom Kilby), thinking that she is suffering from stress. He then develops romantic feelings for Little Mo.

Oliver goes on a date with Little Mo, where she confides in him that she sometimes struggles with Freddie. He walks her home that night and they share a kiss on the doorstep. Little Mo later confides in Oliver that she has nearly hit Freddie in the past when he has been crying. When Freddie is injured, Oliver tells his colleague, Briony Campbell (Rae Hendrie), what Little Mo has told him. Briony tells Social Services, who suspect Little Mo has caused Freddie's injuries. However, Little Mo suspects 10-year-old Ben has caused them. Little Mo discovers that Oliver has betrayed her and ends their relationship. Oliver is offered a job in Leeds and decides to leave Walford.

At the same time, Ben tells Oliver that he has hit Freddie on purpose, confirming Little Mo's suspicion, but Ben's father Phil (Steve McFadden) tells Oliver to keep quiet. Oliver takes Little Mo for dinner and tries to convince her to go to the police and clear her name but she refuses. They go to The Queen Victoria public house together and Peggy Mitchell (Barbara Windsor) calls Little Mo a child beater. Oliver stands up for her and is about to tell everyone the truth about Freddie's injury. Little Mo is angry with Oliver for not respecting her decision and she storms out of the pub.

Oliver gets drunk the following day and barmaid Dawn Swann (Kara Tointon) has to help him get into his flat at the end of the night. Little Mo's cousin Stacey Slater (Lacey Turner) sees this but doesn't tell her. Oliver finally admits to Little Mo that he loves her and proposes to her on 25 May 2006. Happy with the outcome, the two prepare to leave Walford for Leeds, but Oliver first apologises to Dawn for throwing her out of his flat the day he got drunk. She gives him a friendly kiss but Stacey also sees this and tells Little Mo who then confronts Oliver and pushes him to the ground; in response, he ends their relationship. As Little Mo prepares to leave for Barnstaple, Oliver realises that he still loves her and decides to ask her to go with him to Leeds. He runs to the tube station and tries to convince her to join him. Little Mo chooses not to go with him, and she leaves with Freddie. Oliver leaves Walford for Leeds on the same day.

== Carly Wicks ==
Carly Wicks, played by Kellie Shirley, moves to Albert Square with her father Kevin (Phil Daniels) and her brother Deano (Matt Di Angelo) after the breakdown of her marriage to Nico Pappas (Gerard Monaco). She is also unwittingly reunited with her estranged mother, Shirley Carter (Linda Henry), during a family holiday in Dorset. Carly has brief relationships with Martin Fowler (James Alexandrou), Jake Moon (Joel Beckett) and Sean Slater (Robert Kazinsky), despite there being a feud between Sean and Deano.

== Kevin Wicks ==
Kevin Wicks, played by Phil Daniels, moves to Albert Square with his children Deano and Carly (Matt Di Angelo and Kellie Shirley). He starts a relationship with Denise Fox (Diane Parish), and the two marry in April 2007, despite Kevin's ex-wife Shirley's (Linda Henry) attempts to stop them. Kevin runs a car lot, but when he agrees to sell "cut-and-shut" stolen cars for Phil Mitchell (Steve McFadden) the enterprise leads to tragic consequences.

== Bert Atkinson ==
Bert Atkinson
- EastEnders character
- Portrayed by: Dave Hill
- Duration: 2006–2007, 2017
- First appearance: Episode 3107; 24 February 2006
- Last appearance: Episode 5554; 29 August 2017
- Introduced by: Kate Harwood (2006); Sean O'Connor (2017)
In-universe information
- Occupation: Road sweeper
- Wife: Evie Brown (divorced)
- Daughters: Karen Brown
- Grandsons: Jay Brown

Bert Atkinson, played by Dave Hill, makes his first appearance in Albert Square on 24 February 2006. He is last seen leaving Walford on 23 July 2007. Bert is from Slaithwaite in Huddersfield, Yorkshire and is proud Yorkshireman, who frequently mentions his origins. He can often be found boasting around Albert Square about how Southerners do not match up to him and his fellow Northerners. He returned unannounced on 28 August 2017 for two episodes.

He is a friend of Joe Macer (Ray Brooks), and comes to Walford to visit him, having heard from Joe's daughter Megan (Niky Wardley) of his marriage to Pauline Fowler (Wendy Richard). On the day he arrives, he is mistaken for a tramp by Bradley Branning (Charlie Clements) and interrupts Martin (James Alexandrou) and Sonia Fowler's (Natalie Cassidy) evening by letting himself into their house while Joe and Pauline are on their honeymoon.

He flirts with Mo Harris (Laila Morse) and takes her back to Pauline and Joe's house, where the newlyweds walk in on them kissing on the sofa. Mo identifies a tattoo on his upper left arm as one obtained in prison, and realises that Bert knows Joe from prison. When Mo finds Bert in an alley in a tight embrace with Ina, a local market stall holder, she splits up with him and reveals his secret to Dot Branning (June Brown). After Pauline discovers Joe and Dot's betrayal, Bert moves in with Dot, Jim (John Bardon), Sonia and Bradley at No. 25 Albert Square. He later makes up with Mo and their passion starts again.

In November 2006, Bert receives a visit from a man telling him that his ex-wife Evie (Marji Campi) wants to see him. She is dying of breast cancer, and tells Bert that she still loves him, even after 38 years of not seeing each other. She also reveals that their daughter, Karen, died of breast cancer in 2004. Bert brings Evie back to Walford to stay with Pat Evans (Pam St Clement) while the rest of her family are away, and Bert moves in with her, breaking up with Mo. Evie dies days after arriving in the Square but she shocks Bert by telling him that he has a grandson called Jay (Jamie Borthwick). At Evie's funeral Bert meets Jay for the first time but does not introduce himself because he is too afraid of what may happen. Bert moves out of Pat's house and in with Patrick (Rudolph Walker) and Yolande Trueman (Angela Wynter).

On 5 February 2007, Beryl, the carer of Bert's grandson, Jay, brings Jay to live with Bert, saying she cannot look after him any more. Bert tries to teach Jay not to steal, as he steals from Deano Wicks' (Matt Di Angelo) stall and Patrick and Yolande's shop. Pat later persuades Ian Beale (Adam Woodyatt) to let Bert and Jay live at 15a Turpin Road. He is referred to an eye specialist with a suspected glaucoma after a check up at his optician's. Initially Bert refuses to have anything to do with surgery but after Jay discovers how serious his condition is and threatens to move out, Bert has the surgery and appears to make a full recovery.

In July 2007, Jay's father, Jase Dyer (Stephen Lord), appears in Albert Square, looking for his son. After an initially hostile meeting, Bert allows him to meet Jay. The father and son get on together, and Jase moves into the flat. On seeing his grandson is being well looked after, Bert takes his cue to pack his bags and move on from the Square on 23 July 2007.

Bert returns to Walford ten years later when Phil Mitchell (Steve McFadden) tells Jay that Jase is not his biological father. Bert backs up Phil's story but it is later revealed that Max Branning (Jake Wood) blackmailed Phil into lying about Jay's paternity.

== Jack Edwards ==
Jack Edwards
- EastEnders character
- Portrayed by: Nicky Henson
- First appearance: Episode 3108; 27 February 2006
- Last appearance: Episode 3255; 10 November 2006
- Introduced by: Kate Harwood
In-universe information
- Wife: Janet Bishop (backstory)
- Daughters: Honey Mitchell
- Grandsons: Will Mitchell
- Granddaughters: Janet Mitchell

Jack Edwards, played by Nicky Henson, is the father of Honey Mitchell (Emma Barton). The character was to have been played by former musician David Essex, originally for only 3 weeks, but Essex pulled out when the role expanded and he was unable to commit to the increased time. The role was re-cast and Nicky Henson played the part.

Jack has a dog called Dalgliesh and a narrowboat called Patonia. He initially shows a strong dislike of his daughter's fiancée, Billy Mitchell (Perry Fenwick), and poses as a plumber to get to know what Billy is really like. He also has a crush on Peggy Mitchell (Barbara Windsor). Jack leaves Walford to complete a job, but returns in July for Billy and Honey's wedding and continues flirting with Peggy. They get together, but split up when Peggy refuses to accept Jack's newborn granddaughter, Janet, who has Down's syndrome. He reappears again in November when Honey runs away from Billy and Janet.

Since his departure, Jack is mentioned in February 2008 when Billy and Honey announce to Peggy that they are going to visit him for a week on his narrowboat with Janet and a newborn baby Will Mitchell. He is then mentioned again in September 2008 by Billy, who tells Archie Mitchell (Larry Lamb) that Honey has taken the children and left him, moving in with Jack. In May 2010, Billy is told that Honey and Jack have been involved in a car accident and Jack has died.

== Jez Franks ==
Jez Franks
- EastEnders character
- Portrayed by: Tex Jacks
- Duration: 2006–2007
- First appearance: Episode 3143; 28 April 2006
- Last appearance: Episode 3340; 2 April 2007
In-universe information
- Father: Vince Franks

Jez Franks, played by Tex Jacks, is a bully in Ben Mitchell's (Charlie Jones) year at Walford Primary School. He is first seen at Ben's tenth birthday party, when he and another boy, Ali, fix a game of pass the parcel, so Jez wins the prize, a camera. He is later seen at the opening of Walford Video, when Ben's father, Phil's (Steve McFadden) lawyer, Stella Crawford (Sophie Thompson) embarrasses Ben by revealing that the shop isn't actually his yet – and Jez teases him.

Jez is then seen in March 2007, bullying Ben in the playground at school, threatening to make him deaf in his only hearing ear. This leads Ben to wetting himself, and Stella, Phil's girlfriend, tells Ben to stand up for himself, then watches as Jez and some other boys attacks Ben. Phil later attacks Jez's father, Vince (Jamie Kenna), and tells him to keep Jez away from Ben and the bullying stops.

== Chelsea Fox ==
Chelsea Fox, played by Tiana Benjamin, arrives in Walford and is seduced by Grant Mitchell (Ross Kemp). She is soon joined by her half-sister Libby (Belinda Owusu) and mother Denise (Diane Parish), who disapproves of her daughter's fling with Grant. Chelsea goes on to have a relationship with Sean Slater (Robert Kazinsky), but he ends it and her shame for being rejected by him leads to Chelsea going to prison. When she is released, Chelsea traces her estranged father, Lucas Johnson (Don Gilet), and goes on to have relationships with Theo Kelly (Rolan Bell) and Ellis Prince (Michael Obiora).

== Denise Fox ==
Denise Celeste Fox, played by Diane Parish, moves to Walford with her daughters Chelsea and Libby (Tiana Benjamin and Belinda Owusu). She has a relationship with Kevin Wicks (Phil Daniels), and despite her ex-husband Owen Turner (Lee Ross) and his ex-wife Shirley Carter (Linda Henry) trying to come between them, they marry in April 2007. Kevin dies on New Year's Eve 2007, and after grieving for him Denise reunites with Chelsea's father, Lucas Johnson (Don Gilet). However it eventually emerges that Lucas is unhinged, and after murdering Owen, and keeping Denise prisoner he is put in prison. Soon after Denise is joined by her sister, Kim (Tameka Empson). After a long time being single, Denise begins a relationship with Ian Beale (Adam Woodyatt).

This is Parish's second role in EastEnders, as she previously played singer Lola Christie in 1998.

== Libby Fox ==
Elizabeth "Libby" Fox, played by Belinda Owusu, moves to Walford with her mother Denise (Diane Parish) and her half-sister Chelsea (Tiana Benjamin). Libby secretly contacts her abusive alcoholic father, Owen Turner (Lee Ross), which eventually leads to him kidnapping her and trying to murder her. Libby Befriends Darren Miller (Charlie G. Hawkins) and they begin a relationship. However, after Libby begins studying at the University of Oxford, the distance puts a strain on the relationship.

== Carla Mitchell ==
Carla Mitchell
- EastEnders character
- Portrayed by: Christianne Oliveira
- First appearance: Episode 3159; 26 May 2006
- Last appearance: Episode 3167; 9 June 2006
In-universe information
- Occupation: Landlady
- Husband: Grant Mitchell (2003–2006)
- Sons: Mathias
- Stepdaughters: Courtney Mitchell

Carla Mitchell, played by Christianne Oliveira, is the Brazilian wife of Grant Mitchell (Ross Kemp). She lived in Rio de Janeiro and ran a bar with Grant, before moving to Walford. She doesn't get on well with Grant's daughter Courtney (Megan Jossa). She also has her own son named Mathias. Grant left her in February 2006 when she had an affair with a man called Ray (David Kennedy). She arrives in Walford in May 2006 to try to reconcile with Grant, who does not want anything to do with her at first, but he gives in to her pleas and they reunite.

On 5 June, Carla is terrified to find Ray in Albert Square, demanding £12,000 that Carla had stolen from him. When Carla promises to pay him, they have sex, and begin an affair. Carla tells Grant that Ray wants £25,000, in a bid to run back to Rio with Ray. Grant and Carla plan to start a new life in Portugal together with Courtney and Carla's son Mathias, but Grant learns of Carla's scam with Ray. Grant gives Carla bag of money, supposedly to pay off Ray, but the previous day, Grant had ordered Ray to leave the Square with nothing. Carla takes the bag of money and leaves, but when she opens the bag, she is surprised to discover it is full of Grant's underwear and no money. Upon returning, Grant throws Carla out. When she tries to return again, Grant's mother Peggy (Barbara Windsor) slaps her across the face before her saying her famous line, 'get outta my pub'. Carla does so, and has not been seen since.

== Ray ==
Ray
- EastEnders character
- Portrayed by: David Kennedy
- First appearance: Episode 3164; 5 June 2006
- Last appearance: Episode 3167; 9 June 2006
- Introduced by: Kate Harwood

Ray (also known as Marco), played by David Kennedy, arrives in Walford to track down his ex-lover Carla Mitchell (Christianne Oliveira), who had left him in Brazil to return to her husband Grant (Ross Kemp). Carla had been having an affair with Ray while she was married to Grant. He followed Carla to Walford to reclaim £12,000 that Carla had stolen from him, but Carla has sex with him, telling him that they can get back together. However, Ray tells Carla that he still needs the £12,000 back. She goes to Grant and tells him she needs £25,000 to pay off Ray.

The next day, Grant and his brother Phil (Steve McFadden) visit Ray, who tells them that he needs the £12,000. When Grant discovers that Carla has lied to him he is distraught, giving Ray the opportunity to run from his hotel room. Phil goes after him, and while they are gone Grant smashes the room with a baseball bat. After smashing a chest of drawers, Grant finds Ray's passport, giving a false name, Marco. Ray is next seen being pulled from the boot of Phil's Jaguar by Grant outside The Queen Victoria pub. Grant realises that he is a criminal, and gives him a small amount of money and his passport, directing him to the tube station, telling him never to return. This is Ray's last appearance.

Ray was Kennedy's second role in EastEnders, as he also portrayed Dave Roberts in 2002.

== Owen Turner ==
Owen Turner, played by Lee Ross, is the ex-husband of Denise Fox (Diane Parish) and father of her daughter, Libby (Belinda Owusu). Owen is an abusive alcoholic, and when he reunites with Libby, it leads to him kidnapping her and trying to kill her. After spending 3 years in prison for these crimes, Owen contacts Libby again, telling her he has changed and is sober. Libby and Denise seem to believe Owen, however Denise's fiancé, Lucas Johnson (Don Gilet), is less sure, and takes matters into his own hands to protect Denise and Libby.

== Victor Brown ==
Victor Brown
- EastEnders character
- Portrayed by: Jimmy Yuill
- First appearance: Episode 3168/3169; 15 June 2006
- Last appearance: Episode 3251; 3 November 2006
In-universe information
- Occupation: Walford Community Charitable Trust patron
- Wife: Maeve Brown

Victor Brown, played by Jimmy Yuill, is a patron of the Walford Community Charitable Trust (the WCCT). He is an old friend of Ian Beale (Adam Woodyatt), and used to ask him for donations for charity events. He is first seen asking Phil Mitchell (Steve McFadden) to host a Football World Cup gala in The Queen Victoria pub. Phil refuses, but Ian overhears and phones Victor offering to host and organise the gala instead. Victor invites him to sit on a sub-committee, helping to organise the event.

While talking to Ian in the pub, Victor asks Ian if "Mrs. Beale" would be interested in being involved in the gala. Ian replies that Jane (Laurie Brett) would love to help, leading Victor to believe that Ian and Jane are married. Ian and Victor decide to host the gala in Albert Square, during the England versus Sweden match, which is very successful. The next day Victor invites Ian to a party, and introduces him to Rob Minter (Stuart Laing).

Victor appears again to ask Ian if Jane could help out in an auction the WCCT is organising. Jane agrees initially, but then refuses as it coincides with a parents evening. Ian then pays Dawn Swann (Kara Tointon) to pose as his wife at the event. Jane eventually finds out that Dawn has been posing as her, and forces Ian to confess to Victor, and quit the WCCT. Victor's wife Maeve (Siobhan Redmond) also tries to seduce Ian. Victor later appears at Ian and Jane's engagement party, where he tells Pat Evans (Pam St. Clement) that Maeve has left him after 33 years of marriage.

== Steve Clarke ==
Steve Clarke
- EastEnders character
- Portrayed by: Tom Bennett
- First appearance: Episode 3170/3171; 16 June 2006
- Last appearance: Episode 3203; 11 August 2006

Steve Clarke, played by Tom Bennett, is a colleague of Bradley Branning (Charlie Clements) at Eichel Investment Banking, who first appears in Walford when he meets Bradley to have drinks at Scarlet nightclub. Steve starts jeering at the exotic dancer, SJ Fletcher (Natasha Beaumont), and Bradley joins in, upsetting his girlfriend Stacey Slater (Lacey Turner).

Steve appears again in August, and bullies Bradley in The Queen Victoria pub, forcing him to buy all the drinks. Bradley's father, Max (Jake Wood) tells Steve to leave Bradley alone, which only leads to more bullying at work, including Steve creating a flash animation of Bradley's head on a baby's body.

Bradley and Steve later learn that they are both possibilities for a promotion at the bank where they work. Steve is confident in his interview, but Bradley forwards an abusive e-mail from Steve to their boss, Mr. Andrews (Alan McKenna), which gets Steve fired. He is last seen being escorted out of the bank by security after losing his job.

== SJ Fletcher ==
Sarah-Jane "SJ" Fletcher, played by Natasha Beaumont, first appears when her car's tyre deflates in Albert Square. The character and casting was announced in April 2006 and she made her first appearance on 16 June 2006. Her main storyline was using Minty Peterson (Cliff Parisi) for money after he develops romantic feelings for her. EastEnders later introduced Sid Clarke (Simon Gleeson), SJ's ex-boyfriend. SJ made her last appearance on 12 October 2006.

== Rob Minter ==
Robert "Rob" Minter, played by Stuart Laing, begins dating Dawn Swann (Kara Tointon). Dawn knows Rob is married, but also that he is separated. However it is revealed that Rob is married to May Wright (Amanda Drew), who wants to give their marriage another chance. Rob and Dawn split, but Dawn has become pregnant with Rob's child. She plans to have an abortion, however May, who is unable to conceive, has other ideas, and Rob and May then offer to buy Dawn's baby when it is born. Keeping Dawn to the agreement proves difficult however, and at the instigation of May, Rob is forced to extreme measures to obtain his child.

== Max Branning ==
Maxwell "Max" Branning, played by Jake Wood, is the son of Jim (John Bardon), and father of Bradley Branning (Charlie Clements). He moves to Albert Square with his wife Tanya (Jo Joyner) and their daughters, Lauren and Abi (Madeline Duggan and Lorna Fitzgerald) for a fresh start after Max had been caught having an affair. They have a baby, Oscar, however Max soon goes back to his old ways, and has an affair with Bradley's girlfriend, Stacey Slater (Lacey Turner). The affair has devastating consequences, and leads to Tanya burying Max alive, and Lauren running him over. Max has a relationship with Vanessa Gold (Zöe Lucker), but eventually goes back to Tanya. However they split again and while spending time away from Walford, Max marries Kirsty (Kierston Wareing). Max has been regarded as one of the soap's "iconic" characters.

== Tanya Branning ==
Tanya Lauren Branning, played Jo Joyner, is married to Max Branning (Jake Wood). She moves to Walford with him and their daughters, Lauren and Abi (Madeline Duggan and Lorna Fitzgerald), for a fresh start after Max had been caught having an affair. They have a baby, Oscar, but after Tanya learns that Max has had another affair, she leaves him and starts a relationship with Sean (Robert Kazinsky), and then Max's brother, Jack (Scott Maslen). Tanya eventually returns to Max, but after another split, she marries Greg Jessop (Stefan Booth). Tanya then has an affair with Max, but when she is diagnosed with cancer it ends her marriage with Greg, and her affair with Max. However, after recovering, Tanya soon returns to Max yet again.

== Abi Branning ==
Abigail "Abi" Branning, played by Lorna Fitzgerald, is the youngest daughter of Tanya (Jo Joyner) and Max (Jake Wood). Her parents' volatile marriage often leads to Abi playing mediator, despite her family trying to shield her from the worst of the conflict. Abi develops a crush on Darren Miller (Charlie G. Hawkins), but moves on to have a relationship with Jay Brown (Jamie Borthwick). Abi also proves to be a loyal support to her sister, Lauren (Jacqueline Jossa) during her alcoholism. For her portrayal as Abi, Fitzgerald won the "Best Dramatic Performance from a Young Actor or Actress" award at the 2012 British Soap Awards.

== Lauren Branning ==
Lauren Branning is played by Madeline Duggan from 2006 to 2010, and Jacqueline Jossa from 2010 onwards. She is the eldest daughter of Max (Jake Wood) and Tanya (Jo Joyner), the sister of Abi (Lorna Fitzgerald), and half-sister of Bradley Branning (Charlie Clements). Lauren uncovers an affair between her father and Bradley's fiancée, Stacey Slater (Lacey Turner). The affair leads to the breakdown of her parents' marriage, and blaming Max, Lauren runs him over in a car. Lauren has brief relationships with Peter Beale (Thomas Law) and Ryan Malloy (Neil McDermott), but has a serious relationship with her cousin, Joey Branning (David Witts). However, when Lauren becomes an alcoholic this leads to Joey ending their relationship.

== PC Lance ==
PC Lance
- EastEnders character
- Portrayed by: Giles New
- Duration: 2006, 2008–2011
- First appearance: Episode 3191; 21 July 2006
- Last appearance: Episode 4191; 8 April 2011
- Introduced by: Kate Harwood (2006); Diedrick Santer (2008)

PC Lance, played by Giles New, is a police officer. He arrests Billy Mitchell (Perry Fenwick) for indecent exposure in July 2006, searches for Sean Slater (Robert Kazinsky) and Amy Mitchell (Kamil and Natalia Lipka-Kozanka) in December 2008 and arrests Whitney Dean (Shona McGarty) for shoplifting in February 2009.

In November 2009, PC Lance arrests Owen Turner (Lee Ross) for breach of his licence conditions. He appears again in May 2010 to inform Billy about a car accident that has injured his ex-wife Honey Mitchell (Emma Barton) and killed her father Jack Edwards (Nicky Henson). In October 2010, he attends the Jacksons' house after Billie Jackson (Devon Anderson) is found dead after a party. In December he attends the Jacksons' again with a colleague when Bianca Butcher (Patsy Palmer) is accused of stealing perfume. They search the house and Bianca loses her temper, accidentally slapping Lance. She is then arrested and driven away.

In April 2011, he arrests Whitney again for shoplifting. As he is taking her into the police station, Lauren Branning (Jacqueline Jossa) recognises her and asks what she has been arrested for but he refuses to tell her. Later Lauren confronts him again as he comes out of the police station and he tells her that Whitney has given him a false name. Lauren then gives him her mobile phone number and tells him to give it to Whitney so she can call her when she is released.

== Caroline Bishop ==
Caroline Bishop
- EastEnders character
- Portrayed by: Una Stubbs
- First appearance: Episode 3191; 21 July 2006
- Last appearance: Episode 3254; 9 November 2006
In-universe information
- Sisters: Janet Edwards
- Nieces: Honey Mitchell
- Other relatives: Janet Mitchell; Will Mitchell

Caroline Bishop, played by Una Stubbs, is the maternal aunt of Honey Mitchell (Emma Barton), and acted as a surrogate mother to Honey when her mother Janet died during childbirth. Caroline is outgoing, eccentric and vivacious, and visits Albert Square for Honey's second wedding to Billy Mitchell (Perry Fenwick). Jack (Nicky Henson) brings her with him to Walford, which makes Peggy Mitchell (Barbara Windsor) jealous.

Caroline later returns to Walford for Honey's third wedding, which is a surprise wedding. She accompanies Honey to hospital when she goes into labour, and is collected by her boyfriend, Boot. When Honey wants to give her baby Janet up for adoption, she visits Caroline, who reveals that she had once given a child up for adoption herself. She also reveals that Boot has left her, taking some of her possessions with him.

In January 2020, Honey leaves Walford for a few months and moves in with Caroline temporary while seeking help for her bulimia.

== Sid Clarke ==
Sid Clarke
- EastEnders character
- Portrayed by: Simon Gleeson
- First appearance: Episode 3203; 11 August 2006
- Last appearance: Episode 3238; 12 October 2006
- Introduced by: Kate Harwood

Sid Clarke, played by Simon Gleeson, appears in eleven episodes between episode 3203 and 3238, first broadcast on 11 August and 12 October respectively. He is introduced as the Australian boyfriend of SJ Fletcher (Natasha Beaumont).

Following Sid's arrival, SJ tells Minty Peterson (Cliff Parisi) that Sid is her brother, so she can continue to use him for his money. Sid makes it clear to SJ that he wants her to bleed Minty dry of all his money, which leads to SJ and Minty starting a relationship. SJ confides in Sid that she wants to return to Australia and have a baby, but he says he cannot meet her demands yet. That night, Minty walks in on the pair in bed together. The next morning, SJ and Sid have disappeared.

Australian actor Scott Major auditioned for the role. Kate Woodward from Inside Soap called Sid a "scumbag" and a "layabout loser" and questioned "What on earth" SJ saw in him.

== Rachel Branning ==
Rachel Branning
- EastEnders character
- Portrayed by: Sukie Smith (2006); Pooky Quesnel (2007–2010)
- Duration: 2006–2010
- First appearance: Episode 3204; 14 August 2006
- Last appearance: Episode 3960; 5 March 2010
- Introduced by: Kate Harwood (2006); Diederick Santer (2007)
In-universe information
- Husband: Max Branning (1987-1993)
- Sons: Bradley Branning

Rachel Branning is played by Sukie Smith in 2006, and Pooky Quesnel from 2007 to 2010. She is the mother of Bradley Branning (Charlie Clements), and former wife of Max (Jake Wood). She arrives in Albert Square after Bradley's grandfather Jim (John Bardon) threw him out.

She is still bitter about Max cheating on her with Tanya (Jo Joyner). She attacks Tanya at the opening of Booty. Rachel is determined to split Max and Tanya up so she tries to kiss Max but he does not reciprocate. She apologises to Tanya and then returns to Tring. Rachel returns to the Square on 18 October 2007 to help with preparations for Bradley's wedding to Stacey Slater (Lacey Turner). She tries to take control of everything and constantly makes snide remarks about Tanya. She also warns Stacey that she could be next on Max's list of women, but like Tanya, Rachel is unaware of Stacey's affair with Max. Tanya tells Rachel to move on, but she remains stuck in the past.

On 3 January 2008, she returns to Walford after Dot Branning (June Brown) had called her to tell her that Bradley needed her help after learning about Stacey's affair with Max. Rachel takes action and tells Bradley that he should move in with her to take his mind off things. Bradley first says no, but after second thoughts, agrees to go and leaves Dot a note, telling her that he has changed his mind and has gone alone. On 12 February, Stacey goes to Tring, looking for Bradley and goes to Rachel's house. Rachel is not pleased to see Stacey, and tells her that Bradley wants nothing more to do with her. Rachel tries to throw her out but Stacey reveals that she was pregnant with Bradley's child but he insisted she have an abortion. Rachel shows sympathy to Stacey and gives her Bradley's address. Bradley later confronts his mother about giving Stacey his address, but Rachel tells Bradley that he needs to make a choice about his relationship with Stacey. Bradley travels to Tring to spend Christmas Day 2008 with Rachel. She comes to Walford for Bradley and Syd Chambers' (Nina Toussaint-White) leaving party on 8 October 2009.

She again makes snide remarks towards Tanya. Rachel gets drunk and warns Tanya that Max will always be a cheater but Tanya defends him and tells Rachel to move on from her own heartbreak. Rachel returns on 3 December 2009 when Max needs money, telling her that he needs to forward it to Bradley in Canada, but asks her to make the cheque out to him. Masood Ahmed (Nitin Ganatra) drives Rachel back to Tring but Max notices Rachel did not sign the cheque so he phones her mobile. She removes her seatbelt to reach her bag and Masood falls asleep at the wheel, causing the car to swerve and topple over. Masood is slightly injured but Rachel is hospitalised with a ruptured spleen. When Max visits her, she tells him that she knew he was going to forge her signature on the cheque and that he was conning her all along. Rachel is discharged and visits Max, giving him a cheque for £3,000, saying she does not want to see his children out on the street.

In February 2010, Bradley dies after falling from the rooftop of The Queen Victoria public house. Max cannot face telling Rachel, so his sister, Carol Jackson (Lindsey Coulson), phones her instead. Rachel makes her final appearance at Bradley's funeral on 5 March 2010, where she lays flowers on his grave with Dot.

== Sean Slater ==
Sean Slater, played by Robert Kazinsky, is the brother of Stacey (Lacey Turner) and son of Jean Slater (Gillian Wright). Soon after moving to Walford he dates Ruby Allen (Louisa Lytton), and then has sexual encounters with Preeti Choraria (Babita Pohoomull), Chelsea Fox (Tiana Benjamin) and Carly Wicks (Kellie Shirley). He dates Tanya Branning (Jo Joyner) for a time, and even helps her bury her husband Max (Jake Wood) alive. However this soon ends and Sean begins dating Roxy Mitchell (Rita Simons) who becomes pregnant. Roxy gives birth to Amy, however initially it is not certain that Sean is her father.

== Janet Mitchell ==
Janet Mitchell is the daughter of Billy and Honey Mitchell (Perry Fenwick and Emma Barton). Janet is diagnosed with Down's syndrome shortly after her birth, and Honey finds it hard to cope, so they put Janet up for adoption. Janet is given to a foster family, but after she is taken into hospital for major surgery, Billy and Honey decide to keep her. Janet leaves Walford with her brother, Will Mitchell, and Honey in September 2008 after her parents' marriage breaks down, however Janet and William have continued to visit Billy in Walford since then.

== Stella Crawford ==
Stella Crawford, played by Sophie Thompson, is introduced as Phil Mitchell's (Steve McFadden) new lawyer. They begin dating, and Stella soon moves in with Phil and his son, Ben Mitchell (Charlie Jones). Ben does not like her at first, but Stella tricks him into trusting her. After some time, Stella then begins physically and mentally abusing Ben. Phil proposes and she accepts, but on the wedding day, Ben confesses to Phil what Stella has been doing to him.

== Liz Turner ==
Liz Turner
- EastEnders character
- Portrayed by: Kate Williams
- Duration: 2006, 2009–2010
- First appearance: Episode 3221; 12 September 2006
- Last appearance: Episode 4047; 5 August 2010
- Introduced by: Kate Harwood (2006); Diederick Santer (2009)
In-universe information
- Occupation: Market trader
- Husband: Ted Turner (backstory)
- Sons: Owen Turner
- Granddaughters: Libby Fox

Liz Turner, played by Kate Williams, is the mother of Owen Turner (Lee Ross) – the ex-husband of Denise Fox (Diane Parish). Initially a recurring character, Liz first appeared on 12 September 2006. She returned in July 2009 on a more regular basis, and in April 2010 it was announced that the character had been axed. Her final episode was broadcast on 5 August 2010.

Liz arrives in Walford from her home in Spain for Owen's trial, following his arrest for assaulting Denise. When Owen receives a suspended sentence, Liz arranges for him to move to Cardiff with her sister, and tries to take Owen away in a taxi. As the taxi leaves, Owen gets out and tells his mother he needs an alcoholic drink. He returns drunk, and knocks Liz unconscious. She wakes up to find that he has kidnapped his daughter Libby (Belinda Owusu), and tried to kill her and himself. Liz tries to visit Libby in hospital, but Denise lies to her that Libby is sleeping. She then returns to Spain.

She returns three years later for Libby's 18th birthday, and tells Libby that Owen wants her to visit him in prison. Libby does visit him, but regrets it after Denise finds out from her other daughter, Chelsea (Tiana Benjamin). Liz tries to apologize to the Foxes about what Owen did to them, but Denise refuses to accept it. Liz then tries to get to know Libby better, but Libby informs her that Denise does not want Owen back in her life and Libby is going to support her mother's decision – meaning that she is no longer able to spend time with Liz. After an emotional goodbye between grandmother and granddaughter, Liz visits Owen one last time before returning to Spain, but he demands that she cancel her flight. The next week Liz decides to live in Walford, becoming Dot Branning's (June Brown) lodger, which is met with opposition from Denise. She starts working on Ian Beale's (Adam Woodyatt) fruit and veg stall and starts learning dances with Patrick Trueman (Rudolph Walker) for a charity event, and they eventually go on a date.

When Owen is released from prison, he comes to Walford to see Liz, even though his license conditions forbid it. Owen starts a vendetta against Denise's new fiancé Lucas Johnson (Don Gilet), and Lucas calls the police feeling very jealous of his presence to Denise. Lucas has Owen arrested for breaching his licence conditions, and when Liz visits him in prison he fails to convince her that Lucas is not the man everyone thinks he is. Liz orders Owen to get away from Walford, but he confronts Lucas on the day of his wedding to Denise – with Owen having just learned that Lucas is responsible for the death of his ex-wife Trina (Sharon Duncan Brewster), who recently died in October 2009. However, as Owen prepared to report Lucas to the police about the circumstances of Trina's death, Lucas murders Owen by strangling him to death with his bow tie. Liz – unaware that her son was murdered – feels guilty as she has sent Owen away from Walford so that he cannot interfere. She constantly tries to call him but thinks he has disowned her after not returning the calls, so she decides to give up and return to Spain. She returns again a few months later, turning up at Lucas and Denise's house, worried that she has not heard from Owen. She enlists Patrick's help, and they discover Owen has not used his mobile phone since the day he disappeared. Liz and Lucas argue over Owen, but Lucas promises to help her find her son. Liz mentions that Owen never fails to send flowers on her birthday, and is relieved when she receives flowers in Owen's name, but is suspicious when they are lilies, as Owen always sends daffodils. She returns to Spain without telling Patrick, but after he speaks to her on the phone, she says she will return to continue searching for Owen.

When Liz returns to Walford, she and Patrick start a relationship. Patrick worries that Liz wants to marry him but is relieved when Liz says she does not want to get married at her age. She decides she cannot continue the relationship without Owen's blessing, so begs Patrick to help find him. However, Denise asks Patrick to ask Liz to back off searching for Owen, and Patrick attempts to end their relationship, but Liz still wants to continue. That night Owen's body is discovered in the Square, and the next day the police inform Liz, leaving her devastated. Liz informs the police that she believes Denise is capable of killing Owen and watches as she is taken in for questioning. Liz then mourns Owen with Libby, but Libby disowns her after finding out that Liz had spoken to the police about Denise. Another body is found, which is identified as Denise's. Liz goes to Denise's wake and Patrick asks her to leave, but Libby says she wants her to stay and she reconciles with her granddaughter. On Libby's birthday, Liz gives her a photo of Owen. She is later surprised when Libby and her family run from the house with Denise, who turns out to have been held hostage by Lucas ever since she learned about what he did to Owen and Trina – with Lucas having murdered another woman to make it appear that Denise committed suicide. It is then that Patrick reveals to Liz and the rest of the square that Lucas was the one who killed Owen and Trina – not Denise. Shortly afterwards, Liz watches as Lucas surrenders himself to the police and is arrested for her son's murder – as well as Trina's death too.

Liz soon decides that she will return to Spain after Owen's funeral, and Chelsea asks to come with her to start a new life. Denise insists that Libby goes with them for a holiday. Preparing to leave, Liz says a final goodbye to Dot – saying it is hard to meet friends at her age. She is surprised when Dot remains relatively cold towards her, hiding the fact she does not want Liz to leave. Liz then says goodbye to Patrick, saying she will not return to England and that he has missed his chance. Waving goodbye to Walford, Liz leaves in a taxi with Libby and Chelsea.

== Joy Lucas ==
Joy Lucas
- EastEnders character
- Portrayed by: Doña Croll
- First appearance: Episode 3226; 21 September 2006
- Last appearance: Episode 3241; 17 October 2006
In-universe information
- Husband: Cedric Lucas (until 2006)

Joy Lucas, played by Doña Croll, arrives in Walford with her husband Cedric (Ram John Holder), who is visiting his old friend and bandmate in The Five Hectors, Patrick Trueman (Rudolph Walker). They get lost and ask Denise Fox (Diane Parish) in the Post Office for directions to Patrick's house. Joy compliments Patrick's wife Yolande (Angela Wynter) on her cooking, and helps her with the washing up. After Cedric reveals to Patrick and Jim Branning (John Bardon) that he is dying, Joy and Cedric leave to visit more friends in London, and then plan to return to their home in Trinidad.

Joy returns in October 2006 to tell Patrick and Yolande that Cedric has died. She attends his funeral and wake, with Patrick, Yolande, and Cedric's other surviving bandmate, Aubrey Valentine (Joseph Marcell). Denise Fox has revealed that her father was in a band called The Five Hectors, and Patrick tells Joy and Aubrey that her father is either himself, Cedric, Aubrey, or one of the two other deceased band members. (It is later revealed in 2026 that Denise's father was the band's sound engineer, Darnell Larson) Joy later returns to Trinidad.

== Cedric Lucas ==
Cedric Lucas
- EastEnders character
- Portrayed by: Ram John Holder
- First appearance: Episode 3226; 21 September 2006
- Last appearance: Episode 3227; 22 September 2006
In-universe information
- Wife: Joy Lucas (until 2006)

Cedric Lucas, played by Ram John Holder, arrives in Walford with his wife Joy (Doña Croll), to visit his old friend and bandmate in The Five Hectors, Patrick Trueman (Rudolph Walker). They get lost and ask Denise Fox (Diane Parish) in the Post Office for directions to Patrick's house. Cedric seems tired and worn out, and Patrick is shocked when he declines an offer of a glass of rum, and only asks for a small portion of food. Patrick's other guest, Jim Branning (John Bardon), has heard of Cedric's wild reputation from Patrick, and is also shocked at the frail old man he has met. When Patrick confronts Cedric, he tells him that he is dying of pancreatic cancer, and this is the "farewell tour" – he advises Patrick to enjoy his life, and not take it for granted as he has done. Afterwards, Cedric and Joy leave to visit more friends in London, and then plan to return to their home in Trinidad.

After Cedric's death, Denise reveals to Patrick's wife Yolande (Angela Wynter) that she had never known her father but she knew he was in a band called The Five Hectors, making it possible that Cedric was her father. However, twenty years later in 2026, it is revealed that Denise's father was the band's sound engineer Darnell Larson.

== May Wright ==
Dr. May Wright, played by Amanda Drew, arrives as the new local GP, and is married to Rob Minter (Stuart Laing). May and Rob are separated, and Rob has been in a relationship with Dawn Swann (Kara Tointon), but he ends it when May wants to give their marriage another chance. Dawn discovers she is pregnant with Rob's child, and plans to have an abortion. However May, who is unable to conceive, persuades Dawn to let her and Rob buy her baby when it is born. When eventually Dawn reneges on the deal, May resorts to desperate measures to get the baby.

== Aubrey Valentine ==
Aubrey Valentine
- EastEnders character
- Portrayed by: Joseph Marcell
- First appearance: Episode 3241; 17 October 2006
- Last appearance: Episode 3248; 30 October 2006
- Introduced by: Kate Harwood

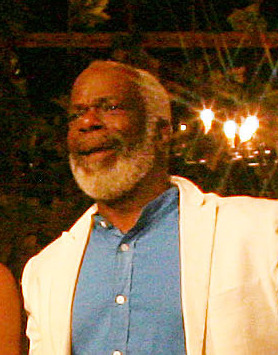
Joseph Marcell appeared as Aubrey Valentine, his second role in the show, across multiple episodes in 2006.

Aubrey Valentine, played by Joseph Marcell, was once a member of a band called The Five Hectors, along with Patrick Trueman (Rudolph Walker), Cedric Lucas (Ram John Holder) and two other men named Dwight and Earl. Marcel had previously guested in the serial for two episode in 1992 as carpenter Adrian Bell. Aubrey first appears in Walford for Cedric's funeral. Patrick reveals to Aubrey that local resident Denise Fox (Diane Parish) knows that her father was in The Five Hectors, but she does not know his name. On realising that he could possibly be Denise's father, Aubrey leaves the funeral reception.

He later returns and attends a dinner party at Patrick and Yolande Trueman's (Angela Wynter) house, with Denise, her boyfriend Kevin Wicks (Phil Daniels), and children Chelsea Fox (Tiana Benjamin) and Libby Fox (Belinda Owusu). He agrees to take a paternity test for Denise, and stays with her at Pat Evans' (Pam St. Clement) house. He later moves in with Patrick and Yolande when he finds out that Patrick and Pat had previously had an affair. He then gets Yolande drunk and they share a passionate kiss.

When Yolande wakes up, she cannot remember anything beyond the kiss, but Aubrey implies that they had sex together. She decides to throw Aubrey out of her house, and whilst packing his bag for him, finds that he hasn't sent off the paternity test. She confronts Aubrey, who tells her that he knows he isn't Denise's father, but didn't send off the test because he didn't want Patrick to have a daughter when he doesn't. He also reveals that he isn't rich as he had previously stated, and the car he drives is not his, but hired. Aubrey also confesses that he lied about having sex with Yolande, as he is jealous of Patrick having a wife.

Aubrey carries on pretending that he is awaiting the test results, until he makes a speech during another dinner party at Pat's house, where he refers to Denise and her daughters as "family", and Yolande exposes him as a fraud. He subsequently tells Patrick that he and Yolande had kissed. As he drives away he tells Patrick that things have not changed, and he always gets Patrick's girls.

== Preeti Choraria ==
Preeti Choraria
- EastEnders character
- Portrayed by: Babita Pohoomull
- Duration: 2006–2008
- First appearance: Episode 3247; 27 October 2006
- Last appearance: Episode 3501/3502; 3 January 2008
- Created by: Kate Harwood
In-universe information
- Occupation: Beautician
- Father: Dilip Choraria
- Mother: Nayna Choraria

Preeti Choraria, played by Babita Pohoomull, made her first appearance on 27 October 2006 and she left the Square on 3 January 2008.

On 15 February 2007, during an interview on This Morning, Shilpa Shetty confirmed that she had been asked to take the role of Preeti's sister in EastEnders. Shetty said that after much thought she would be unable to take the role as it would mean all her other arrangements would have to go on hold. However, EastEnders bosses have reportedly denied rumours that Preeti's family were to join the show.

=== Storylines ===
Preeti is a beauty therapist working at a beauty parlour called La Jolie Madame, but when Tanya Branning's (Jo Joyner) business starts failing, Tanya's husband Max (Jake Wood) suggests that she should poach Preeti to work at her beauty parlour, Booty, as Preeti has a large clientele. She has a one-night stand with Sean Slater (Robert Kazinsky) when his fiancée Ruby Allen (Louisa Lytton) is in Venice. Sean's sister Stacey (Lacey Turner) slaps her, but they later become friends.

Preeti attends Tanya's birthday party with colleague Chelsea Fox (Tiana Benjamin). She dresses up in high heels and enhances her breasts with padding to impress Mickey Miller (Joe Swash), but falls over when she sees him as she is not used to wearing the shoes. When she gets up, Mickey's girlfriend, Li Chong (Elaine Tan) sees the padding and announces it to the pub. Preeti runs back to Chelsea's house, distraught. On Preeti's birthday, Chelsea and Li organise an Ann Summers-style party at Stacey's house. Bradley Branning (Charlie Clements) asks Preeti out after Deano Wicks (Matt Di Angelo) is unsuccessful in chatting her up. She enters into a relationship with Bradley but he ends it because he still has feelings for Stacey. Preeti goes on a date with salesman Warren Stamp (Will Mellor), but he attacks her, bruising her arm.

When Li manipulates Mickey into becoming an escort, Preeti teaches Mickey the finer arts of massage in an effort to get close to him. When Li discovers this, she is jealous. Li takes the opportunity to take revenge on Preeti during a ruckus at party held at Shirley Carter's (Linda Henry) flat by viciously standing on her toe. Preeti flirts with Mickey when helping him find Gus Smith's (Mohammed George) dog, Wellard, who has been kidnapped. Preeti continues to have feelings for Mickey and is put out when he and Gus go on a date with twin sisters Tamara and Tonicha (Helen and Rachel Coombe). Mickey, however, remains oblivious to her affections and merely sees her as a good friend. Preeti is fired by Tanya after vandals break into the salon after she forgets to lock up the night before. However, Tanya apologises to her about her behaviour and makes it up to her by offering her the position of manager. Preeti accepts her apology but does not want to take the job. She explains that it is time for her to move on, and as she leaves the Square, she bumps into a man who chats her up and she walks away with the mystery man. Preeti is not seen again but is mentioned in 2010 when Chelsea finds a toy that Preeti gave her.

== Li Chong ==
Li Chong
- EastEnders character
- Portrayed by: Elaine Tan
- Duration: 2006–2007
- First appearance: Episode 3258; 16 November 2006
- Last appearance: Episode 3398; 12 July 2007
In-universe information
- Occupation: Entrepreneur
- Father: Liang Chong
- Mother: Yanmei Chong

Li Chong, played by Elaine Tan, made her first appearance on 16 November 2006 and her last on 12 July 2007. Her appearance was officially announced on 21 October 2006, but the character was seen on a storyboard in a backstage picture in First magazine in the week before the announcement.

Li is first seen in Walford Videos, where she sells Cantonese DVDs to Mickey Miller (Joe Swash). She continues doing business with Mickey, and attracts the attention of Mickey's teenage brother Darren (Charlie G. Hawkins), who tells her that Mickey wants to cook dinner for her, when in fact Darren wants to seduce her. Li ties Darren to his bed, writing "Loser" on his head in lipstick. After that she gets together with Mickey, who seems scared of her "sex madness". She is later seen at Tanya Branning's (Jo Joyner) birthday party, and exposes a rival to Mickey's affections, Preeti (Babita Pohoomull), who has enhanced her breasts with padding. Li later borrows £200 from Darren and provides stock for Preeti's Ann Summers-style party. Li fails to sell any stock, and the party ends with her fighting with Chelsea Fox (Tiana Benjamin).

Li's relationship with Mickey progresses and they both eventually move into Gus Smith's (Mohammed George) flat. It is revealed there that Li is growing cannabis, much to Mickey's fury but she tells him that she wouldn't have to do it if he had good work. When Mickey fails to get the job of a post boy at Bradley Branning's (Charlie Clements) office, Li advertises him as an escort without him knowing, but Gus finds out and informs Mickey. Mickey then warns Li to cancel the ad. Li leaves when Mickey admits that he wants more from their relationship. In shock, Li packs her bags and leaves Walford.

== Linda Clarke ==
Linda Clarke
- EastEnders character
- Portrayed by: Lynda Baron
- Duration: 2006, 2008–2009, 2016
- First appearance: Episode 3264; 27 November 2006
- Last appearance: Episode 5300; 10 June 2016
- Introduced by: Kate Harwood (2006); Diederick Santer (2008); Dominic Treadwell-Collins (2016)
In-universe information
- Husband: Roger Clarke
- Sons: Christian Clarke
- Daughters: Jane Beale
- Grandsons: Bobby Beale (adoptive)

Linda Clarke, played by Lynda Baron, is the mother of Jane Beale (Laurie Brett) and Christian Clarke (John Partridge). She appeared for three episodes in 2006, and then regularly from November 2008 to February 2009. On 8 April 2016, it was announced that Linda would return for a Beale family storyline later in the year. She returned on 26 May 2016, departing on 10 June the same year.

Linda surprises her daughter by coming to Walford for Jane's wedding to Ian Beale (Adam Woodyatt). Linda instantly causes controversy when she calls Ian a bad father after she hears his daughter, Lucy (Melissa Suffield), talking to her friend, Lauren Branning (Madeline Duggan), about strippers. She also criticises Pat Evans's (Pam St. Clement) earrings at Jane's hen-party, and berates Jane for wearing white when she is marrying for a second time. Linda reveals that Jane's birth name is Lesley, and continues to call her Lesley during her stay. When Jane's affair with Grant Mitchell (Ross Kemp) is revealed at the wedding ceremony, Linda leaves Walford and returned to Florida.

Linda returns on 10 November 2008, telling Ian and Jane that she and her husband Roger (Geoffrey Hutchings) have gone on separate holidays. Ian asks her to make a cake for Suzy Branning (Maggie O'Neill) to beat Shirley Carter (Linda Henry) in a cake-baking competition. However, Linda gets upset, starts drinking, and makes a poor effort at the cake. Later, in The Queen Victoria pub, a very drunk Linda tries to come on to Charlie Slater (Derek Martin), offending his girlfriend, Brenda Boyle (Carmel Cryan), in the process. Explaining her actions, Linda admits to Ian and Jane that she has split up with Roger and is moving in with them.

Linda has not seen Christian for nearly 20 years before she returns to Walford. Initially, Christian intends to keep his distance from his mother but after learning how Lucy and Peter Beale (Thomas Law) had lost their mother, Christian attempts to rebuild his relationship with Linda and she briefly moves in with him. When Christian announces that he is going to bring up Roxy Mitchell's (Rita Simons) daughter, Amy, Linda has doubts as to whether it is the right thing for her son. The following night, after Roxy changes her mind, Christian goes back to his old ways of sexual promiscuity, and bringing anyone home. Not being able to live in that environment, Linda decides to move back in with Jane and Ian. She continues to live with the Beales over Christmas.

On 26 January 2009, Linda receives a letter from her husband, asking her to go back to him. Confused, Linda looks for solace at the Queen Victoria pub, sharing a few drinks with Patrick Trueman, (Rudolph Walker). Later that day, Jane and Denise Wicks (Diane Parish) find Linda and Patrick kissing passionately. The next day, Patrick tells Linda that he hopes for a reconciliation with his wife, Yolande (Angela Wynter). Trying to put her marriage behind her, Linda decides to stay in Walford, but Ian suggests that she move into sheltered accommodation. Later that day, Linda falls and hurts her leg, and Ian thinks this was a ploy in order for her to stay. While Linda is asleep, Ian steals the letter from her husband, and then invites him to fetch her. On 3 February 2009, Roger arrives at the Beales' house. He declares that his affair is over, and asks Linda to return to Florida. While Jane and Ian are positive about this, Christian warns Linda that his father will only hurt her again. Christian suggests that Linda should move back in with him, but she declines and returns to Florida with Roger.

On 26 May 2016, Linda rushes to the hospital with Christian after she finds out Jane has been brutally attacked by her adopted son Bobby Beale (Eliot Carrington) and left in a coma. Upon arrival, they speak to the consultants and learn that Jane may never walk again. Linda furiously demands that Ian leaves, to stay away from Jane, and also brands Bobby as evil and a victim of woeful parenting. However, after Ian explains the circumstances to Christian, and Christian speaks to Linda, Linda tells Ian that if he goes home for rest, she will inform him of any news. Linda is horrified to learn that Steven Beale (Aaron Sidwell) has returned. Steven once shot Jane in the stomach which is the reason for Jane not being able to have children of her own. Once Jane awakes, she tells her about Steven. Linda returns to the Square briefly where she meets Linda Carter (Kellie Bright) and Masood Ahmed (Nitin Ganatra). She tells Masood how she wishes Jane would have stayed with him. After saying goodbye to Jane, Linda returns to Orlando Florida.

== Shirley Carter ==
Shirley Carter, played by Linda Henry, is the estranged mother of Deano (Matt Di Angelo) and Carly Wicks (Kellie Shirley), and the ex-wife of Kevin Wicks (Phil Daniels). After seeing her children again during a holiday in Devon, Shirley moves to Walford to be near them. After a relationship with Vinnie Monks (Bobby Davro), Shirley begins a relationship with Phil Mitchell (Steve McFadden). Shirley and Phil buy a house on the Square, and she acts as a mother figure to his son Ben Mitchell (Joshua Pascoe) and ward Jay Brown (Jamie Borthwick). However, when Shirley discovers that Phil has concealed the truth about Ben killing her best friend Heather Trott (Cheryl Fergison), she ends her relationship with Phil. Shirley departed the show on 29 December 2022.

== Jay Brown ==
James "Jay" Brown, played by Jamie Borthwick, is the grandson of Bert Atkinson (Dave Hill) and Evie Brown (Marji Campi). Jay first appears after Evie's funeral, when he is taken to live with Bert in Walford. Jay's father, Jase Dyer (Stephen Lord) moves to Walford to be with Jay in July 2007, and Bert soon leaves. However, after Jase is killed in disturbance with his old football firm, Jay lives with Billy Mitchell (Perry Fenwick) and starts a relationship with Abi Branning (Lorna Fitzgerald). After he witnesses Ben Mitchell (Joshua Pascoe) killing Heather Trott (Cheryl Fergison), he is forced to keep quiet by Ben and his father, Phil (Steve McFadden). However, once truth is revealed, Ben is found guilty of murder, and Jay is found guilty of perverting the course of justice.

== Other characters ==
Character	Date(s)	Actor	Circumstances
Marie Matthews	5 January	Susan Cruse	The Bridge Street market inspector. She appears on 5 January 2006 when Deano Wicks (Matt Di Angelo) illegally sells "WOOF" (Walford One Owed Freedom) T-shirts, to try to help save Gus Smith's (Mohammed George) dog, Wellard from being euthanised for attacking Ian Beale (Adam Woodyatt). Deano charms her and gets off with a warning.
Comfort Shodipe	13 January 2006– 30 March 2022 (3 episodes)	Nicola Alexis	A nurse who delivers Shabnam Masood's (Rakhee Thakrar) stillborn baby son, Zaair in 2015. She also delivers Roland Highway in 2022.
Guy Matthews	10 February	Steve Sarossy	An owner of a car that Minty Peterson (Cliff Parisi) is fixing at The Arches. He reveals to Dawn Swann (Kara Tointon) that he is a wine merchant and asks her out for dinner. The date goes well, but after they step outside of the restaurant, Guy kisses Dawn and pinned her against a wall. She struggles to get free, and shouts at him, telling him she is too good for him. She kicks his car, denting it, and walks home.
Megan Macer	16–17 February (2 episodes)	Niky Wardley	The daughter of Joe Macer (Ray Brooks), and comes to Walford for her father's wedding to Pauline Fowler (Wendy Richard), and instantly takes a disliking to her. On the wedding day she makes up with Pauline. After the wedding she leaves Walford, but it is later revealed that she had given Bert Atkinson (Dave Hill) Joe's new address when he got out of prison.
Yanis Pappas	20–23 February (3 episodes)	Peter Polycarpou	The father of Nico Pappas (Gerard Monaco), Carly Wicks' (Kellie Shirley) husband. Yanis does not approve of Carly, and when Yanis and Kevin Wicks (Phil Daniels), Carly's father, arrange a family liaison meeting, it descends into a fight. When Nico and Carly reconcile, Yanis offers them a restaurant in Cyprus. Nico accepts his offer, but Carly decides to stay in London.
Nico Pappas	20–24 February (4 episodes)	Gerard Monaco	The husband of Carly Wicks (Kellie Shirley). Before his arrival in Walford, he and Carly had been living in Cyprus with his family. Carly left Nico after a string of arguments. They reconcile for just one day before Nico's father Yanis (Peter Polycarpou) offers him and Carly a restaurant in Cyprus. Carly doesn't want to go, so Nico leaves without her. On 29 May 2007 Carly learns that Nico has filed for a divorce.
Anna Pappas	21 February	Anna Savva	The mother of Nico Pappas (Gerard Monaco), Carly Wicks' (Kellie Shirley) husband. Anna does not approve of Carly, and at a family liaison meeting (which descends into a fight) Anna fights with Carly.
Helen Pappas	21 February	Uncredited	The sister of Yanis Pappas (Peter Polycarpou), and aunt of Carly Wicks' (Kellie Shirley) husband, Nico (Gerard Monaco). She attends a liaison meeting between Carly's family and her family, but she ends up pulling Carly's hair when the meeting turns into a fight.
Chris Pappas	21 February	Uncredited	The elderly uncle of Yanis Pappas (Peter Polycarpou) and great uncle of Carly Wicks' (Kellie Shirley) husband, Nico (Gerard Monaco). He attends a family liaison between Carly's family and his family, but the meeting descends into a fight.
Matthew	27 April-22 May (3 episodes)	Ian Dunn	A social worker that investigated the injuries that Freddie Mitchell (Alex and Tom Kilby) has sustain before he was brought into hospital.
Dr. Briony Campbell	28 April–16 May	Rae Hendrie	A paediatrician who looks after Freddie Mitchell (Alex Kilby and Tom Kilby) when he is injured and has blood on the brain. She interviews Oliver Cousins (Tom Ellis), Walford's GP and boyfriend of Freddie's mother, Little Mo Mitchell (Kacey Ainsworth). Oliver tells her that Mo had once nearly hit Freddie. Briony then informs the police and social services, who investigate Mo. When Mo finds out that Oliver had told Briony, she ends their relationship. After more extensive tests, Freddie is found to have a low platelet count, and Mo is cleared of all allegations. Mo later thinks that Briony and Oliver are a couple, but Briony informs her that Oliver still likes her.
The Reverend David Walsh	15 May–5 September	Jeremy Child	A vicar, first seen renting a pornographic film in Walford Video for a sermon he is writing. He later visits Billy Mitchell (Perry Fenwick) and Honey Edwards (Emma Barton), who want to get married in a church, but when Reverend Walsh discovers that Billy is divorced, he tells Honey and Billy they cannot get married in the church. He is later blackmailed by Peggy Mitchell (Barbara Windsor), who threatens to tell everyone that he rented a porn film. After this, he marries Billy and Honey in September.
Elaine Jarvis	8 June–14 July	Siân Reeves	The manager of Fargo's restaurant. She is attracted to Kevin Wicks (Phil Daniels), and pursues him. Kevin rejects her, however, when she sacks Chelsea Fox (Tiana Benjamin) from the restaurant. Elaine then walks in on Kevin passionately kissing his ex-girlfriend, Denise Fox (Diane Parish).
Malma Chaudury	10–11 July (2 episodes)	Shereen Martineau	A staff nurse at Walford General Hospital, where Sonia Fowler (Natalie Cassidy) is a trainee nurse. She smells alcohol on Sonia's breath, as Sonia had been out drinking the previous night. She sends Sonia home, saying that she is being unprofessional. The next day Malma calls Sonia and her tutor into her office, and after smelling alcohol on Sonia's breath yet again, her tutor suspends her for two weeks.
Gemma Clewes	14–18 July (3 episodes)	Natalie J. Robb	The mistress of Max Branning (Jake Wood). Max visits her after an argument with his wife Tanya (Jo Joyner). After Max reconciles with his wife, he ends his relationship with Gemma. She proceeds to stalk him, even introducing herself to his estranged son Bradley (Charlie Clements). The next day, she books an appointment with Tanya to get a makeover. Bradley sees her waiting to see Tanya and forces her to leave.
Tony Andrews	8 August–3 July 2007	Alan McKenna	Bradley Branning's (Charlie Clements) boss at Eichel Investment Banking. He first appears when Bradley is offered a promotion, a job for which he competes with Steve Clarke (Tom Bennett). Tony appears again when Bradley and another colleague, Julie, apply for the same job. It has since been revealed that Tony has relocated to the company's office in Singapore.
Al	10–25 August	Andrew McKay	A mysterious character who moves into 93 George Street in Walford. Chelsea Fox (Tiana Benjamin) takes an instant liking to him, and he also flirts with Ruby Allen (Louisa Lytton) in her nightclub, Scarlet. He is watched by Sean Slater (Robert Kazinsky) and it is revealed that he was previously a soldier until he shot Sean in the back at point-blank range because he thought that Sean slept with his girlfriend before they left for a tour of Iraq. He was acquitted of charges, and moved to Walford. Sean plans to kill Al, he breaks into his flat and starts threatening and intimidating him. He then tells him to finish the job he started, implying that Al should kill him. When Al looks away, Sean assaults and gags Al before taking him to a remote location where he hangs him upside down and begins torturing him. Sean tells Al that he did not sleep with his girlfriend because he did not want to betray him, despite his girlfriend encouraging Sean to do so. Sean then releases Al and tells him that he will kill him if he ever returns to Walford.
Maeve Brown	21–25 August (3 episodes)	Siobhan Redmond	The wife of Victor Brown (Jimmy Yuill), a patron of the Walford Community Charitable Trust (the WCCT). She is first seen on a weekend retreat, with Victor and his fellow WCCT members, including Rob Minter (Stuart Laing), Ian Beale (Adam Woodyatt) and Dawn Swann (Kara Tointon), who is posing as Ian's wife, "Jane Beale". When the real Jane (Laurie Brett) arrives, posing as Ian's nanny, she tells Maeve that Ian and "Jane" have an open marriage. This leads to Maeve flirting with Ian in his room, and them hiding in the wardrobe when Jane and Victor come in. When Victor finds them in the wardrobe, he scorns Maeve for her promiscuous behaviour. Later, when Victor attends Ian and Jane's engagement party, he tells Pat Evans (Pam St Clement) that Maeve has left him after 33 years of marriage.
Annie Grey	8 September	Kate Anthony	A consultant paediatrician who works at Walford General Hospital, and advises Billy (Perry Fenwick) and Honey Mitchell (Emma Barton) about what to do when they discover that their baby, Janet had Down's syndrome. She gives them leaflets but Honey snaps at her.
Graham Stone	14 September	Simon Robson	A cardiologist who visits Billy (Perry Fenwick) and Honey Mitchell (Emma Barton) with the results of tests on their newborn daughter Janet. He reveals that Janet has holes between the ventricles and atria of her heart, which is common in children with Down's syndrome. He informs them of an operation Janet could have to correct it.
Bryan Nolan	18 September–24 December	Mark Springer	A charge nurse who works in the special care baby unit at Walford General Hospital. He looks after Janet Mitchell when she is born with Down's syndrome. Janet's parents Billy and Honey Mitchell (Perry Fenwick and Emma Barton) warm to Bryan, and Honey is upset when he is away on an NHS training course. Bryan hears that Honey wants to see him, and leaves the training course. He finds Billy and Honey's address and visits Honey, convincing her to give Janet a chance. He gives Janet a hat when she leaves hospital to go home. He later appears on Christmas Eve, and speaks to Billy when Janet is ill in hospital again.
Karin Jones	26–29 September (2 episodes)	Anna Lauren	A brewery agent who visits Scarlet nightclub. She meets with barman Sean Slater (Robert Kazinsky), and when the bar manager Jake Moon (Joel Beckett) walks in on them later, Sean's actions imply that he and Karin have just had sex. When she comes to the club later in the week, Jake tells her that she can use the office to have her meeting with Sean. Jake then get Sean's girlfriend Ruby Allen (Louisa Lytton), and drags her to the office. They find Karin and Sean discussing alcopops. However, as Karin walks out the door, she zips her skirt up out of Ruby's sight.
Susan Gilbride	10–16 October (3 episodes)	Jemima Abey	Rebecca Miller's (Jade Sharif) teacher at Walford Primary School. She is first seen telling Rebecca's mother, Sonia Fowler (Natalie Cassidy), that Rebecca's grandmother Pauline (Wendy Richard) has taken her ticket for the school's harvest festival assembly. Susie is then seen at the assembly, where she recognises Rebecca's father, Martin (James Alexandrou) from when they attended Walford Primary School together. Martin also asks Susan if he can give a speech to Rebecca's class about fruit and vegetables.
Nina Brown	20 October	Victoria Woodward	A family liaison officer for Her Majesty's Prison Service. She and her associate, Kate Chole, inform Ruby Allen (Louisa Lytton) that her father, Johnny (Billy Murray), who had previously been incarcerated in prison, has died from a heart attack.
Kate Chole	20 October	Uncredited	A governing governor in Her Majesty's Prison Service. She and her associate, Nina Brown (Victoria Woodward), inform Ruby Allen (Louisa Lytton) that her father, Johnny (Billy Murray), who had previously been incarcerated in prison, has died from a heart attack.
Wayne Thompson	3 November	Ian Virgo	A temporary bar manager of Scarlet. The owner of the club, Ruby Allen (Louisa Lytton), hires him so she can take her boyfriend, Sean Slater (Robert Kazinsky), to Venice for a week. Sean is angered by this and throws his keys at Wayne.
Evie Brown	4–8 December	Marji Campi	The ex-wife of Bert Atkinson (Dave Hill). She makes her first appearance when Bert visits her in a hospice, where she is dying of breast cancer. She tells Bert she still loves him, even though she left him 38 years ago, while he was in prison. She also reveals that her and Bert's daughter had died in 2004, also of breast cancer, and that they have a grandson named Jay (Jamie Borthwick). Bert and Pat Evans (Pam St. Clement) take her to live temporarily with them in Albert Square. Whilst there, Evie and Bert share a kiss, and she then tells Bert that she wants him to make contact with Jay, and that neither Jay nor Karen knew Bert existed, as she brought Karen up to believe her second husband, George, was Karen's real father. Evie dies in the front room of 31 Albert Square whilst talking to Bert and holding his hand. Bert sits with her for two hours until Pat realises she has died. Her funeral takes place on 14 December.
Lydia Asler	12 December–13 February 2007	Amy Noble	A lady who worked for a PR firm employed by Eichel Investment Banking to organise their Christmas party. She works alongside Bradley Branning (Charlie Clements), who represents Eichel, and her colleague, Rhys (Joe Fredericks). She defends Bradley when Rhys bullies him, and invites him out for a drink. She attends the Christmas party, and insults Stacey Slater (Lacey Turner), Bradley's girlfriend. This later results in Stacey ruining the party and throwing a drink in Lydia's face. After this, Bradley breaks up with Stacey, and starts a relationship with Lydia. Bradley later grows bored of Lydia and realises he still loves Stacey. He breaks up with Lydia during a Valentine's Day dinner.
Rhys	12–22 December (5 episodes)	Joe Fredericks	A PR Agent for PR firm employed by Eichel Investment Banking to organise their Christmas party. He works alongside Bradley Branning (Charlie Clements), who represents Eichel, and his colleague, Lydia Asler (Amy Noble). She defends Bradley when Rhys bullies him, and invites him out for a drink.
Kim Smith	19 December	Lorraine Arnold	Kim and her husband Tony are prospective foster parents of Janet Mitchell. When Janet's parents, Honey Mitchell (Emma Barton) and Billy Mitchell (Perry Fenwick), decide to have her adopted, Kim and Tony come to Walford to collect Janet. Kim sees that Billy is upset and suggests that they let Billy and Honey say goodbye to Janet alone. The next day, Janet has to have a heart operation, and Billy and Honey decide to have her back.
Tony Smith	19 December	Enzo Squillino Jr.	Kim and her husband Tony are prospective foster parents of Janet Mitchell. When Janet's parents, Honey Mitchell (Emma Barton) and Billy Mitchell (Perry Fenwick), decide to have her adopted, Kim and Tony come to Walford to collect Janet. Kim sees that Billy is upset and suggests that they let Billy and Honey say goodbye to Janet alone. The next day, Janet has to have a heart operation, and Billy and Honey decide to have her back.
Nurse Sarah Michael	24 December 2006– 18 June 2014 (3 episodes)	Ann Akin	A nurse present when Janet Mitchell is hospitalised. In 2014, Sarah treats Sharon Rickman (Letitia Dean) in hospital after she is assaulted in 2014.
