= Kevin Wicks =

Fictional character from EastEnders

- EastEnders character
- Portrayed by: Phil Daniels
- Duration: 2006–2008
- First appearance: Episode 3103; 17 February 2006
- Last appearance: Episode 3499; 1 January 2008
- Introduced by: Kate Harwood
In-universe information
- Occupation: Car salesman
- Father: John Wicks
- Mother: Betty Wicks
- Wife: Shirley Carter (backstory); Denise Fox (2007)
- Sons: Jimbo Wicks
- Adoptive sons: Dean Wicks
- Adoptive daughters: Carly Wicks
- Stepdaughters: Chelsea Fox; Libby Fox
- Uncles: Brian Wicks
- First cousins: Simon Wicks; David Wicks (adoptive)
- Other relatives: Steven Beale

Kevin Wicks is a fictional character from the BBC soap opera EastEnders, played by Phil Daniels. Kevin made his first appearance on 17 February 2006, when he was introduced to the show alongside his two children, Carly (Kellie Shirley) and Dean Wicks (Matt Di Angelo). He was presented as the nephew of a long-running character, Pat Evans (Pam St Clement).

It was announced on 18 August 2007 that Daniels had decided not to renew his contract. This resulted in his character, Kevin, being killed off in a car crash on 31 December 2007. He is last seen in the next episode, broadcast on 1 January 2008, when his wife, Denise Fox (Diane Parish) visits his body.

== Creation and development ==
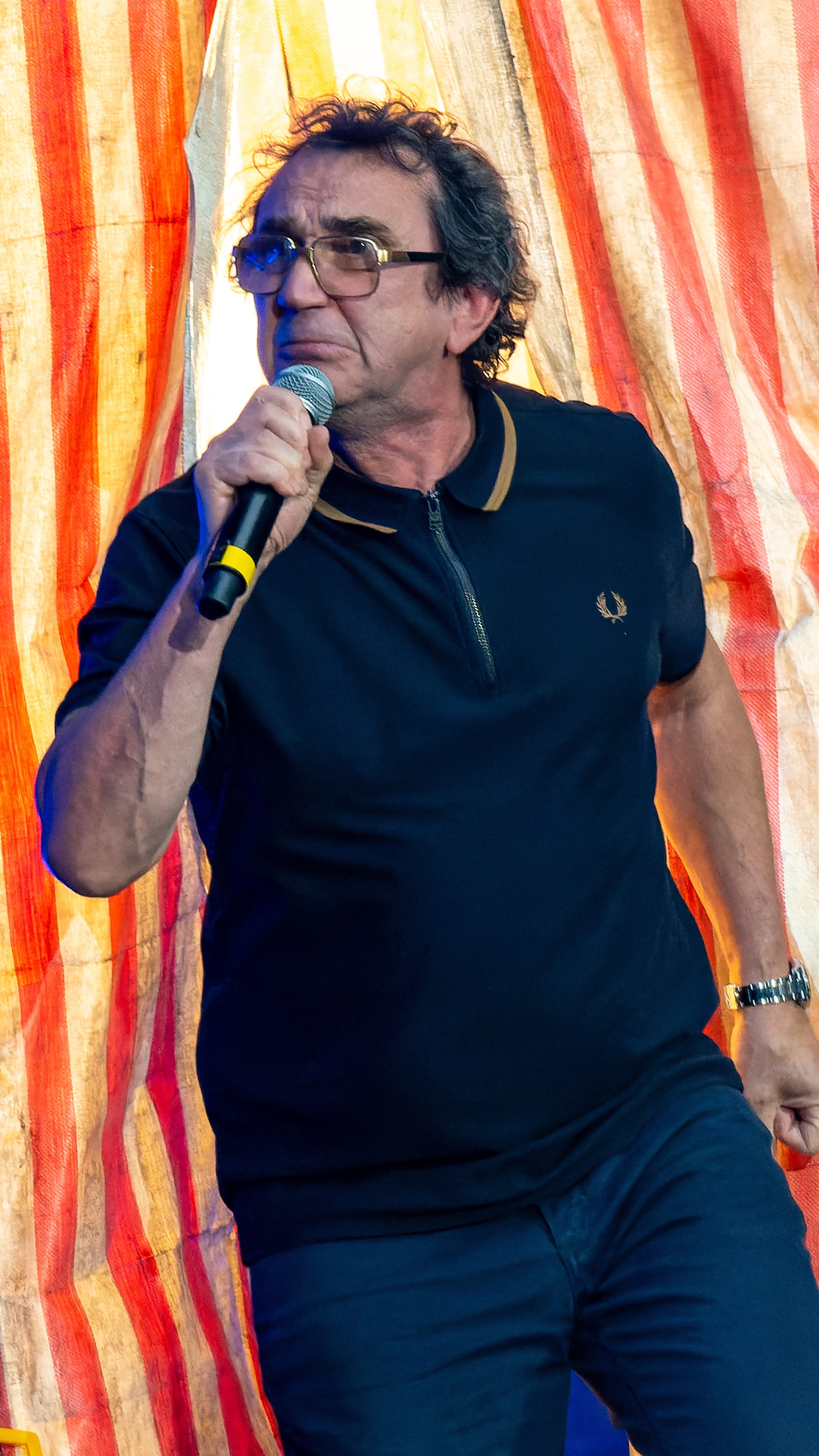
Phil Daniels (pictured) portrays Kevin, the patriarch of the Wicks family.

Kevin Wicks' character and casting were announced on 28 September 2005. The feeling was said to "rev up" EastEnders, and the actor, Phil Daniels, would start filming his first scenes in January 2006, with them airing in February. The scriptwriters had planned to make the new addition to the Wicks family "a force to be reckoned with", especially with Kevin's hooligan son, Deano (Matt Di Angelo), who was the first of the family to be seen on-screen.

Sources described Kevin as a "good-hearted family man." Daniels went on to say of his casting, "I'm looking forward to the challenge of doing some quality mainstream TV." EastEnders producer Kate Harwood added, "Phil Daniels is an extraordinary talent. It is a real coup to have him join the show". Daniels also spoke of how he, and his mother, were big fans of the soap.

== Storylines ==
=== Backstory ===
Kevin was married to Shirley Carter (Linda Henry). The pair had a son, Jimbo Wicks (Lloyd Richards), who had cystic fibrosis. Shirley had several affairs while married to Kevin, resulting in two pregnancies, giving birth to Carly (Kellie Shirley) and Deano (Matt Di Angelo). Despite knowing of their illegitimacy, Kevin brought both children up as his own. However, Shirley found parenting too challenging and abandoned Kevin in 1989, leaving him as a single parent. Jimbo eventually died from his illness; Shirley did not attend his funeral or get in contact with her surviving children.

=== 2006–2008 ===
Kevin follows Deano to Walford, in February 2006, and stays with Pat Evans (Pam St.Clement), the ex-wife of his uncle Brian Wicks (Leslie Schofield). Kevin plans to emigrate but gets involved in Carly's marital breakup. He decides to stay in Walford and support his children, taking over management of the local car lot.

Despite an acrimonious introduction to Denise Fox (Diane Parish) in May 2006, she mistakes him for Grant Mitchell (Ross Kemp) and accuses him of sleeping with her daughter Chelsea (Tiana Benjamin). They realize they are attracted to each other and start dating, but Kevin struggles to cope with Denise's temper. Seeing a more vulnerable side of her, Kevin is convinced to persevere. It is a volatile romance, and Denise ends it several times, resulting in Kevin being pursued by Elaine Jarvis (Siân Reeves). Kevin supports Denise through the abuse of her ex-husband, Owen Turner (Lee Ross), so the couple reunites and move in together. In late 2006, the Wicks family went on holiday to Dorset. Kevin's ex-wife, Shirley, finds them and tries to reunite with her children, Deano and Carly, until Kevin orders her to leave them alone. Shirley refuses and follows them to Walford in January 2007, where she reveals her true identity, causing problems. When Kevin tries to make her leave, Shirley threatens to tell her children that Kevin is not their father. The truth eventually comes out, and both Carly and Deano shun Kevin. Deano eventually forgives Kevin for lying, but Carly does not. Devastated, Kevin leaves Walford, not telling anyone where he is going, and is missing for several months. It is later confirmed he is alive after bank records show he emptied his account in Hastings. He goes to Dungeness and plans to go to France, but after meeting a man named Jed (Burn Gorman), who steals his ferry tickets and dies in a bus crash, Kevin goes home. When Carly rejects him again, he turns to Shirley for comfort and has sex with her. Kevin regrets it and makes Shirley promise to keep the tryst secret. Kevin manages to rebuild his relationship with his children and proposes to Denise. They marry in April 2007, despite Shirley trying to ruin the day by turning up to the ceremony and telling Denise about their recent tryst, only to find that Kevin has already told her.

Kevin has to endure numerous upsets involving his family, including the imprisonment of Deano and Chelsea. They try to frame Sean Slater (Robert Kazinsky) for the assault of Patrick Trueman (Rudolph Walker). Kevin tries to protect them by destroying CCTV footage that shows the real culprit is Craig Dixon (Rory Jennings). However, Carly copies the tape and gives it to the police. Deano and Chelsea are found guilty of attempting to pervert the course of justice and are imprisoned.

In December 2007, Kevin agreed to sell cars for Phil Mitchell (Steve McFadden) being unaware that they were stolen. When he discovers this, he decides to continue selling them, as he wants money for a new house, his family, and a world trip for Deano. Phil later learns from Jack Branning (Scott Maslen) that the cars are dangerous "cut-and-shuts" and tells Kevin to get rid of them. However, Denise has sold one of the cars to Yolande Trueman (Angela Wynter), so on New Year's Eve 2007, Kevin tries to steal Yolande's car and destroy it, however Shirley, who threatens to inform the police unless he persuades Carly to talk to her, jeopardizes his plans. Unable to get rid of Shirley, Kevin throws her into the car, planning to take it to a junkyard to be crushed. However, the vehicle is low on petrol, and they cannot get to their destination, so Kevin and Shirley decide to race the car in circles and then set it alight, making it look like the work of joyriding vandals. While Kevin races dangerously in the car, Shirley goads him to go faster; He drives off at high speed, but the car bonnet flies open, and Kevin loses control and crashes into debris, leaving him impaled by a metal pole. Kevin lives for a few minutes, and he and Shirley talk together. She attempts to keep him alive but fails, and he dies in her arms. Kevin's body is taken to the mortuary, where Denise kisses him at midnight, wishing him a happy new year. Kevin's funeral was held in January 2008, but the hearse broke down, resulting in Kevin's friends and family carrying his coffin to the crematorium. Denise revealed in June that she and Carly had scattered Kevin's ashes in the South China Sea.

Kevin's voice (recorded by Phil Daniels) is heard in a family video watched by Shirley in May 2014 and again in June 2015.

== Reception ==
In 2020, Sara Wallis and Ian Hyland from The Daily Mirror placed Kevin 93rd on their ranked list of the best EastEnders characters of all time, calling him a "Wheeler dealer".
