= Carly Wicks =

Fictional character from EastEnders

- EastEnders character
- Portrayed by: Kellie Shirley; Michaela Stephen (2007 video footage)
- Duration: 2006–2008, 2012
- First appearance: Episode 3103; 17 February 2006
- Last appearance: Episode 4493; 7 September 2012
- Introduced by: Kate Harwood (2006); Lorraine Newman (2012)
In-universe information
- Occupation: Car mechanic
- Father: Daniel
- Mother: Shirley Carter
- Adoptive father: Kevin Wicks
- Stepmother: Denise Fox (adoptive)
- Half-brothers: Mick Carter; Jimbo Wicks; Dean Wicks
- Husband: Nico Pappas (until 2007)
- Sons: Jimmy
- Grandfathers: Stan Carter
- Grandmothers: Sylvie Carter
- Aunts: Tina Carter
- Nephews: Lee Carter; Johnny Carter; Ollie Carter
- Nieces: Frankie Lewis; Nancy Carter; Jade Masood
- First cousins: Zsa Zsa Carter

Carly Wicks is a fictional character from the BBC soap opera EastEnders, played by Kellie Shirley, and by Michaela Stephen in a home movie the Wicks family watched on 23 April 2007. She made her first appearance on 17 February 2006. Carly was axed from the serial after her on-screen father Kevin Wicks (Phil Daniels) quit. Carly is characterised as a tomboy who enjoys an active sex life. One scene sparked complaints from viewers who felt it inappropriate. She is also portrayed as having a dysfunctional relationship with her mother, Shirley Carter (Linda Henry).

Carly departed on-screen on 4 January 2008, when she goes travelling, an exit storyline that Shirley felt was a fitting end to the character. Shirley reprised her role as Carly on 6 September 2012 for a "short, dramatic storyline" lasting two episodes; she departed again on 7 September 2012.

== Development ==
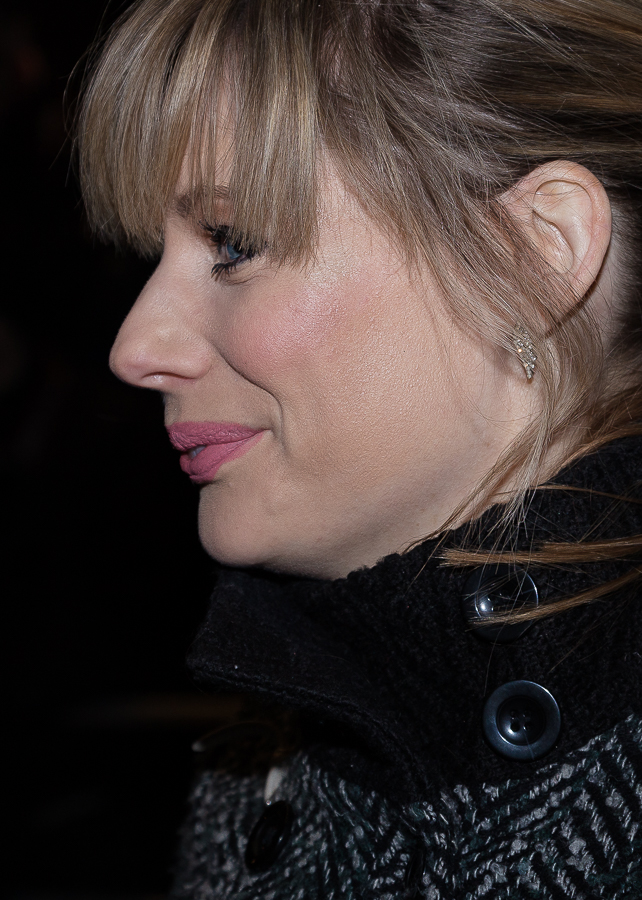
Kellie Shirley (pictured) played Carly.

Carly has had an active sex life in the serial, having charged scenes with Jake Moon (Joel Beckett) and Sean Slater (Robert Kazinsky). Speaking of this she states: "It's nice for Carly to have a sex life and it's nice to be paid to kiss somebody." The filming environment put pressure on Shirley and Kazinsky.

Carly's dress sense is that of a tomboy, she likes work overalls and men's boots. Shirley stated that her cast mates were convinced Carly was going to have a lesbian storyline. She added: "I won't miss some of Carly's clothes. I'm like 'Who picked this out? Are you blind?' I won't miss my work boots, they're horrible. Sometimes I have to wear them with dungarees and a man's T-shirt." Carly has an estranged relationship with her mother Shirley Carter (Linda Henry). Of this, actress Shirley stated: "Shirley is still the mum she doesn't want [...] There's too much bitterness there on Carly's part. It's not that she's being deliberately cruel to Shirley. She just can't let her in. She's seen how many times Shirley's ended up disappointing Deano and she doesn't want to end up hurt like him." Although Kevin is not her biological father, she sees him that way. Carly thought of him as a wonderful father and his death devastates Carly because it is unexpected. Shirley states Carly feels like she has "to put on a brave face but underneath she's cracking up."

When Daniels, who played Carly's father Kevin Wicks, quit the serial, producers decided to write out the rest of the Wicks family. Discussing her contract failing to be renewed, Shirley stated: "It's a shame the option on my contract hasn't been picked up, but it wouldn't feel right to remain in the Square without the rest of my family." In her final scenes Carly and her stepmother Denise (Diane Parish) decide to go travelling to scatter Kevin's ashes. Shirley felt her exit storyline was fitting, stating: "Kevin was desperate to travel and both Carly and Denise think it would be a fitting tribute for him if they travelled with his ashes and scattered them in the countries he so wanted to see. And Carly won't be coming back." Shirley felt one good thing came out of Kevin's death - "The one positive thing that comes out of Kevin's death is that Carly and Denise get a lot closer. Denise is there for her and together they decide that Kevin would have wanted them to do this together." Although Shirley was happy with her exit storyline, she had originally hoped Carly would be killed on-screen.

=== Return (2012) ===
In August 2012, it was announced that Shirley was to reprise her role as Carly, for a "short, dramatic storyline". Daniel Kilkelly from Digital Spy later stated "exact details of Carly's return storyline are currently being kept under wraps, it is understood that viewers will see her back in Walford to visit Shirley after the truth is finally revealed about Heather Trott's (Cheryl Fergison) murder". Heather was murdered by Shirley's partner, Phil Mitchell's (Steve McFadden) son Ben (Joshua Pascoe). Phil and Ben have been keeping the murder a secret from Shirley, but Shirley will find out "leaving her with a big decision to make". Shirley said of her return; "Having left EastEnders in 2008, it's flattering to be asked to return for this storyline. Carly is coming back slightly older, wiser and independent, although she still needs and loves her mum. The Shirley/Carly dynamic is fun to play and is as volatile as ever. I loved working with Linda, as well as Parish and McFadden again". Carly returned on 6 September 2012 for 2 episodes.

== Storylines ==
Carly moves to Walford to live with the man she believes is her father, Kevin Wicks (Phil Daniels) and her half brother Deano Wicks (Matt Di Angelo), after splitting from her husband Nico Pappas (Gerard Monaco). Nico's father, Yanis Pappas (Peter Polycarpou), gives him a restaurant in Cyprus and Carly refuses to work there. She finds employment as a mechanic and is sponsored by her boss, Phil Mitchell (Steve McFadden), to attend college. Carly initially feuds with Dawn Swann (Kara Tointon). Carly publicly exposes Dawn as a liar and they brawl; however, they sort out their differences and become close friends. Carly begins a romance with Martin Fowler (James Alexandrou), but he takes the relationship more seriously than she does and she eventually ends it to begin a sexually charged relationship with Jake Moon (Joel Beckett), which ends a week later.

Whilst the Wickses holiday in Dorset, Carly is unwittingly introduced to her estranged mother Shirley Carter (Linda Henry), and despite Kevin's best efforts, Shirley traces them to Walford and makes herself known to Carly and Deano. Carly rejects her mother, incensed that she had abandoned her for so many years. Further animosity occurs when Carly discovers Kevin is not her biological father, and Shirley had a one-night stand with a man named Daniel. She rejects Kevin, branding him a phoney. Devastated, Kevin runs away, and in his absence Carly momentarily bonds with Shirley, though it is short-lived and when Kevin returns, she reconciles with him, and is once again hostile to Shirley, spitting in her face on one occasion. Carly's stepsister Chelsea Fox (Tiana Benjamin) sets her up on a date with salesman Warren Stamp (Will Mellor), even though Preeti Choraria (Babita Pohoomull) had endured a bad experience on a prior date with him. Chelsea does this as she wants to eliminate Carly as competition for her boyfriend Sean Slater (Robert Kazinsky), who has been flirting with her. Carly is almost raped by Warren, but is rescued by Sean. Carly and Sean have sex and then begin dating, and when Carly tells Chelsea a feud erupts. This leads to Chelsea and Deano's attempt to frame Sean for an assault on Patrick Trueman (Rudolph Walker). Sean is imprisoned and is only released when Carly hands stolen CCTV footage exonerating him over to the police, betraying her brother and Chelsea who are arrested for perverting the course of justice. Carly's relationship with Sean ends however, when Sean arranges for Deano to be beaten up by a gang of thugs. Carly believes her family will not forgive her betrayal, so she leaves Walford and takes a job in a gay bar. Deano flees to stay with her in October, fearing Sean and his trial the following day. Carly helps Deano face up to his responsibilities and returns to walford to support her family when Deano is sentenced to six months in prison.

Despite Sean's assaults on her brother, Carly briefly resumes a sexual relationship with him, but he has little interest in her as he is besotted with Tanya Branning (Jo Joyner). Carly discovers that Kevin has died in a car accident. She visits his body in the morgue and screams, momentarily asking for support from Shirley, who was with Kevin when he died. The following day, however, Carly is incensed that Shirley had been the last face Kevin had seen before he died; she tells Shirley that she wishes it had been her that died instead. She rejects Shirley's further attempts to comfort her, and after Kevin's funeral, Carly and Kevin's wife Denise (Diane Parish) leave Walford to travel the world and scatter Kevin's ashes. Denise returns and reveals that Carly has decided to stay in Thailand. A month later, Carly sends Denise a postcard asking for Kevin's signet ring and it is revealed that Carly is living in Redfern, a suburb of Sydney, Australia.

In 2012, Denise reveals to Shirley that Carly has given birth to a son, and gives her Carly's telephone number to contact her. However, when Shirley phones Carly to congratulate her, Carly rejects Shirley, telling her to never call her again, causing Shirley to break down in tears. In September, Phil calls Carly, asking her to return to Walford to help her mother who has been drinking heavily because Ben Mitchell (Joshua Pascoe) murdered her best friend Heather Trott (Cheryl Fergison), though Phil does not tell Carly this. Upon seeing Shirley in a drunken state, Carly turns to leave while Shirley desperately calls her back. The following day, Carly catches up with Denise, who explains that Shirley is in a bad way because Ben killed Heather. Carly and Shirley make amends and Carly introduces her baby son Jimmy to Shirley. Carly then convinces Shirley to leave Walford with her.

In 2022, after Carly's half-brother Mick (Danny Dyer) goes missing at sea on Christmas Day, Shirley struggles. After Shirley lashes out at Mick's young stepdaughter Scarlett Butcher (Tabitha Byron), Denise calls Carly as she’s worried about Shirley. Carly then calls Shirley and offers for her to go and stay with her and Jimmy. Shirley and the family dog Lady Di then leave the Square to stay with Carly. Carly later sent Linda Carter (Kellie Bright) a photograph of Shirley, which inadvertently revealed that she had reunited with her son, and Linda's rapist, Dean.

== Reception ==
Carly and Jake's sex scene sparked 129 complaints from viewers, with producer Kate Harwood defended the scenes stating: "The intention of the scene was to indicate the passion of a couple being carried away by the moment, but we feel any sexual activity was implied rather than explicit." Kris Green of entertainment website Digital Spy enjoyed the character, stating: "The fresh faces of Deano and Carly certainly provide a breath of fresh air." Lara Kilner of the Daily Mirror brands Carly a "tomboy" and "the boiler-suited, work-booted Carly".
