= Janet Mitchell (EastEnders) =

Fictional character from EastEnders

- EastEnders character
- Portrayed by: Grace
- Duration: 2006–2011, 2014–present
- First appearance: Episode 3217; 5 September 2006
- Introduced by: Kate Harwood (2006); Diederick Santer (2009); Bryan Kirkwood (2011); Dominic Treadwell-Collins (2014)
- Spin-off appearances: Billy's Olympic Nightmare (2012)
In-universe information
- Family: Mitchell
- Father: Billy Mitchell
- Mother: Honey Mitchell
- Brothers: Will Mitchell
- Half-brothers: Dan Pearce
- Grandfathers: Jack Edwards; Stevie Mitchell
- Uncles: Charlie Mitchell; Teddy Mitchell
- Nieces: Lola Pearce
- First cousins: Jamie Mitchell; Harry Mitchell; Barney Mitchell (adoptive)
- Other relatives: Phil Mitchell; Lexi Pearce

Janet Mitchell (briefly known as Petal) is a fictional character from the BBC soap opera EastEnders, played by Grace, who has Down syndrome. Grace has played Janet all her life including all her childhood.

== Storylines ==
=== 2006–2011 ===
Janet is born in September 2006, the day of Billy and Honey's wedding. Billy and Honey had already agreed to name the baby Janet after their mothers. Janet is diagnosed with Down syndrome shortly after her birth. Honey has trouble coming to terms with Janet's condition, and when it is revealed that Janet needs a heart operation, Honey says it will be better for everyone if Janet dies. Honey then refuses to let her daughter be named Janet, as she does not visualise her daughter's future that way. Billy has already started calling her "Petal" as a term of affection, so suggests that they name her that.

Janet (now called Petal) is brought home from the hospital, and Honey finds it hard to cope, wanting to have her adopted. She considers smothering Janet with a pillow, but cannot do it. Honey runs away to her father, Jack Edwards' (Nicky Henson) canal boat in Kent. Billy tracks her down and takes Janet with him. He puts her by the canal, saying that people used to leave babies with Down's syndrome outdoors overnight, and if the baby survived, they'd keep it. Honey is shocked by Billy's actions and he picks her up and they go home. Despite Billy's courage and love for her, Honey's fear of bringing up Janet wins out, and Billy and Honey put her up for adoption, giving her up to a foster family, Kim (Lorraine Arnold) and Tony Smith (Enzo Squillino Jr.), just prior to Christmas. However, when Janet is taken into hospital for major surgery, Billy goes to see her, and when Honey reads Billy's letter to a woman named Petal, she follows, walking in on her Christening. The doctors say she will be fine after surgery. In September 2008, Janet moves away with Honey and her brother Will Mitchell (Toby Warpole), after Billy's relationship with Honey does not work out. However, they still go to visit Billy.

In May 2010, Billy is forced to look after Janet and William, after Honey and Jack are involved in a car crash. He struggles to tell them that Jack has died, and that Honey is in a critical condition. Later that night, Billy finds Janet playing with the drugs that he had been attempting to sell before he found out about the crash, and with that, he sends her to Phil Mitchell's (Steve McFadden). In July 2011, Janet and William meet Billy's granddaughter Lola Pearce (Danielle Harold).

=== 2014–present ===
Janet returns in February 2014, with William. She returns again on 27 May 2014, when Honey visits Walford to tell Billy that she is moving to Canada with Janet and William. Billy is devastated and burns Janet's passport to try to stop them from leaving. Honey remains determined, but decides to leave Janet with Billy when she realises how well she is doing. Janet says goodbye to Honey and William, before officially moving in with Billy, Lola and Lola's daughter, Lexi Pearce (Dotti-Beau Cotterill), until Lola and Lexi leave in July 2015.

In November 2015, Honey and Will (now Freddie Phillips) return from Canada and Billy and Honey decide to give their relationship another go. In October 2016, Billy, Honey, Will and Janet move into the flat above the funeral parlour, where Billy is made a partner in the business. When Janet is struck by a car and hospitalised in October 2017, Billy hurts Honey when he accuses her of treating Janet differently from Will. Janet initially cannot feel her legs, but makes a full recovery. Billy wants to get Janet a dog, so Karen Taylor (Lorraine Stanley) agrees that Billy can have her dog Bronson for a few nights for Janet.

== Reception ==
The storyline involving the birth of Janet Mitchell was criticised by the Royal College of Midwives, who claim the storyline was inaccurate and unrealistic. They claim that Honey should not have been refused an epidural and should not have been told about her daughter's condition without her husband being present. Further to this, Honey and the baby were being looked after by a character who was repeatedly referred to as "nurse Cheryl", when in fact, a midwife would be present, and would check on the baby continuously, rather than leave the mother alone to worry and then disappear without being noticed. They also claim that the baby appeared rigid when in fact she should have been floppy, and that nobody opened the baby's blanket to check.

The BBC say a great deal of research was undertaken, such as talking to families with children who have Down's syndrome, and liaising with a senior midwife, as well as the Down's Syndrome Association. The BBC say Honey was not refused an epidural, but had actually locked herself away in the bathroom. They were also unable to cast a baby with Down's syndrome for the first few episodes, which is why the baby appeared rigid. The Down's Syndrome Association say that the way in which Billy and Honey found out about their baby's condition and their subsequent support is not a best practice model, but is still a realistic situation. Conversely, learning disability charity Mencap praised the soap, saying it would help to raise awareness.

Grace received a nomination at The British Soap Awards 2016 in the "Best Young Performance" category.

In 2017, Rianne Houghton from Digital Spy reported how "devastated" viewers expressed their sadness on social media over Janet's accident, with Houghton commenting, "Pass us the tissues, goddammit". In 2023, Angie Quinn from MyLondon reported how viewers expressed shock at Janet turning 17-years-old, with some commenting that this made them feel "old". Laura Denby from Radio Times called Honey's turmoil over Janet's diagnosis after her birth a "very powerful watch" and called the scenes where Honey struggles to bond with her daughter "heartbreaking", but she also opined that Honey had since become an "excellent" mother to Janet.
