= Owen Turner =

Fictional character from EastEnders

- EastEnders character
- Portrayed by: Lee Ross
- Duration: 2006, 2009
- First appearance: Episode 3168/3169; 15 June 2006
- Last appearance: Episode 3899/3900; 26 November 2009
- Introduced by: Kate Harwood (2006); Diederick Santer (2009)
In-universe information
- Occupation: Handyman
- Father: Ted Turner
- Mother: Liz Turner
- Wife: Denise Fox (backstory)
- Daughters: Libby Fox
- Stepdaughters: Chelsea Fox

Owen Turner is a fictional character from the BBC soap opera EastEnders, played by Lee Ross. He originally appeared in the show on 15 June 2006 and left the show in late 2006. In 2009, it was announced that Ross would return to the show; he appeared on 30 July 2009. Ross' character made his final appearance on 26 November 2009 after being murdered by his ex-wife's new fiancé - Lucas Johnson (Don Gilet).

== Creation and development ==
Owen Turner was introduced by executive producer Kate Harwood in 2006 as the estranged father of established character Libby Fox (Belinda Owusu) and ex-partner of Libby's mother Denise Fox (Diane Parish). Actor Lee Ross was cast in the role and a backstory of a "disappointing" life and alcoholism was revealed in a press release before Owen's introduction. Ross said, "I'm very happy to be joining EastEnders and I'm looking forward to working alongside the entire cast including Phil Daniels and Jake Wood whom I've worked with before." Owen made his first appearance in June 2006.

In December 2009, Harwood's successor Diederick Santer was asked if anything in the year had not gone as he expected it to. He replied: "Something else I didn't expect has been the way that the audience took Owen to their hearts to the extent that they did. It was really satisfying though, to 'redeem' a character in the audience's eyes in the way we did."

== Storylines ==
=== 2006 ===
Owen is the ex-husband of Denise Fox (Diane Parish) and father of her daughter, Libby (Belinda Owusu). He arrives in Walford looking for Libby, whom he has not seen since Denise divorced and left him, due to his alcohol problem. Denise sleeps with Owen, and a couple of days later, he hits her, witnessed by Denise's daughters, Chelsea (Tiana Benjamin) and Libby.

Denise ends their relationship so, drunk, Owen holds her hostage in her flat. He drags her up the stairs by her hair and she stabs him with a fork. After Denise's boyfriend Kevin Wicks (Phil Daniels) and Libby notice Denise's absence, they call the police and Owen is arrested. His mother Liz (Kate Williams) visits him in prison. Owen goes on trial and receives a six-month sentence, suspended for two years.

Owen kidnaps Libby and takes her to Epping Forest in a car stolen from Kevin's car lot. He drugs her and phones Denise, telling her that she will not have to worry about them now. He tries to kill himself and Libby by filling the car with exhaust fumes but Libby escapes. When Denise arrives at the forest and calls Libby's name, she calls back, but Owen grabs Libby and tries to drown her in a stream. She falls unconscious and Owen jumps into the stream himself. Denise arrives to see Libby, unconscious, on the bank of the stream. Owen is revived by paramedics and arrested. He is consequently sentenced to five years imprisonment.

=== 2009 ===
Owen sends Libby a card from prison on her 18th birthday, and Owen's mother, Liz, also contacts her, telling her that after three years in prison, he is sober and would like to see her. Libby visits Owen, who apologises for his behaviour and tells her that he will be released soon and wants to be her father again. She agrees but when Denise finds out, she is livid. Libby forces her to visit Owen in an attempt to prove that he has changed.

However, despite taking responsibility for his actions, she does not trust him and insists he will not change. When she gets home, she tells Libby that Owen will not be part of their lives. Liz is about to leave for Spain but Owen persuades her to stay, telling her that he will keep going until Libby and Denise forgive him. He is released from prison and returns to Walford, despite a restraining order, and works for Jim Branning (John Bardon), decorating his house.

Denise's close friend Patrick Trueman (Rudolph Walker) discovers he is there and threatens to call the police and tell Denise but Jim reminds him of his son Paul (Gary Beadle), and instead Patrick calls Libby, who visits from Oxford, where she is at university. Owen is then invited for lunch with the family, and starts getting on with Denise and Libby. Denise's fiancé, Lucas (Don Gilet) immediately takes a dislike to him, and punches him in an alleyway.

Owen fights back, telling Lucas that he knows Lucas is not who Denise really thinks he is. Liz finds out about the attack, and urges Owen to tell Denise. Owen reveals his bruises and Denise forces Lucas to apologise. Lucas sees Denise walking away from Owen's home and visits Owen, armed with a knife in his pocket. He tells Owen to leave Walford, and when they shake hands, Lucas has blood on his hands. As Lucas's jealousy about Owen and Denise's relationship grows, he calls the police and Owen is arrested but released on appeal.

Owen has a brief relationship with local resident Ronnie Mitchell (Samantha Womack) after they bond one night, talking about their daughters. They agree the next morning that it should remain a one-off, but their relationship ends anyway when Denise warns Ronnie about Owen.

By then, Owen becomes convinced that Lucas was involved in the death of his estranged wife Trina (Sharon Duncan Brewster) when Chelsea tells him that she found Lucas with Trina's bracelet. Though Lucas explains that Denise was hiding the bracelet, Owen makes it clear that he knows the truth about Trina's death. On the day Lucas is due to marry Denise in November 2009, Owen sneaks into the car - owned by Ronnie's cousin Phil Mitchell (Steve McFadden) - that Lucas will be using on his wedding day.

There, he awaits for Lucas to enter and confronts him. Lucas drives to the canal, where Owen threatens to go to the police and report him for killing Trina unless he leaves Walford for good. Owen's attempt fails when Lucas ignores him and, after telling Owen that he had given him a chance to walk away, begins quoting the Lord's Prayer. In response, Owen sets off to report him to the police about the circumstances of Trina's death - only to find the door is locked. As Owen attempts to unlock the door, Lucas abruptly strangles him with his bow-tie - ultimately killing Owen as a result.

Lucas then puts his body in the boot and later goes to bury him under Trina's memorial tree. Both Liz and Libby feel guilty about what they said to Owen; though Liz most of all as she senses something bad has happened to him, and so she phones him, but gets no answer.

After a brief departure, Ronnie inquires on Owen's location - only to learn he has apparently run away. The police are also looking for him as his absence had breached his licence and they intend to send him back to prison. Ronnie reveals to her sister, Roxy (Rita Simons), that she is pregnant and the baby is Owen's.

Ronnie admits while she feels something for Owen, her feelings are almost entirely for the baby. However, she later suffers a miscarriage when her father Archie (Larry Lamb) pushes her on the bar of the Vic. After Liz thinks Owen has disowned her after not returning any of her calls, she decides to give up and returns to Spain. However, she returns again as her suspicions about Owen are aroused even further. She reveals that since Owen was 16, he would always give her flowers on her birthday.

Lucas overhears this and sends lilies from Owen - leaving Liz more suspicious as they are her least favourite flowers. When the tree is broken, Owen's body is discovered by Leon Small (Sam Attwater) as he attempts to replace it. By the time Denise finds out and her suspicions are aroused, Lucas confesses to Owen's murder as well as killing Trina. He then proceeds to kidnap Denise, lock her up in a basement, and fake her death whilst also incriminating her as behind Owen's murder and Trina's death - with Lucas later killing another woman to use as Denise's supposed body. Eventually, she escapes and exposes the truth to her family on the day of Libby's birthday.

Lucas pursues his wife and confirms her story, admitting to have killed Owen so he would cover-up the truth about Trina. After briefly holding Denise and her family hostage, Lucas allows them to escape and they call the police on him; Lucas is arrested and Patrick exposes the truth about Owen and Trina to Walford, leaving Liz shocked to learn that Lucas was the one who murdered her son - not Denise. Following Lucas' arrest, Owen is later given a funeral off-screen.

== Reception ==
The scene involving Owen violently attacking Denise prompted 128 complaints from viewers, who believed it should not have been shown before the 9 p.m. watershed. The programme's executive producer, Kate Harwood, defended the scene, saying, "in tackling the issue of domestic violence, it was important to reflect realistically the sort of violence suffered by the victims in these sorts of situations, rather than to put a gloss on it. We therefore took great care to signal the nature of the episode's content in advance." However, she acknowledged that some viewers would have found the scenes disturbing. Luton South MP Margaret Moran, a member of the all-party parliamentary group on domestic violence, insisted the storyline illustrates real life and may encourage victims to speak out and get help, saying, "we can't hide these things away no matter what time of day it is. [...] Even though this episode was shown before the watershed it will have had a real resonance with children, showing them that they are not alone and can get help. EastEnders will have put contact numbers at the end of the episode for people who are experiencing domestic violence to call. This is based on the guidelines for the BBC I helped to write." Jeff Gardner of Victim Support Bedfordshire, also supported the storyline, saying "Dealing with domestic violence is a very sensitive and difficult thing to do. EastEnders has a large audience and if they were to sensitively raise the issues of domestic violence in the home and how people can get support in relation to it, then I would think that most people would want to support that."

In 2007, for his portrayal of Owen, Ross was nominated for the Villain of the Year award at the British Soap Awards.

== See also ==
- List of soap opera villains
