= Lucas Johnson =

Fictional character from EastEnders

- EastEnders character
- Portrayed by: Don Gilet
- Duration: 2008–2010, 2016, 2020–2021, 2024
- First appearance: Episode 3554; 3 April 2008
- Last appearance: Episode 6861; 21 February 2024
- Introduced by: Diederick Santer (2008); Dominic Treadwell-Collins (2016); Jon Sen (2020); Chris Clenshaw (2024)
- Spin-off appearances: EastEnders: E20 (2010); The Cellar (2010)
In-universe information
- Other names: Mark
- Occupation: Pastor; Community centre manager; Chip shop worker; Van worker
- Sisters: Gloria MacDonald
- Wife: Trina Johnson (until 2009); Denise Fox (2009–2011)
- Sons: Jordan Johnson
- Daughters: Chelsea Fox
- Stepdaughters: Libby Fox
- Grandsons: JJ Johnson; Jordan Fox
- Nephews: Emerson MacDonald; Nate MacDonald

Lucas Johnson is a fictional character from the BBC soap opera EastEnders, played by Don Gilet. He made his first on-screen appearance on 3 April 2008. Lucas is introduced as a reformed drug addict and criminal-turned-preacher who appears as the estranged father of established character Chelsea Fox (Tiana Benjamin/Zaraah Abrahams). He also has a young son, Jordan Johnson (Michael-Joel Stuart), and later goes on to marry Chelsea's mother, established character Denise Fox (Diane Parish) - whom he had previously been in a relationship with prior to their reunion.

While the character originally appeared to be respectfully dedicated to his own religious convictions, Lucas slowly became the show's secondary antagonist when he causes the death of his former wife Trina (Sharon Duncan Brewster) by leaving her to die in a raking accident; murders Denise's ex-husband Owen Turner (Lee Ross) on their wedding day; drowning his son's dog Sugar after the latter risks unearthing Owen's corpse; and strangling Denise before locking her up in a basement while allowing her family to believe that she is responsible for the murders - with Lucas killing another woman to use as Denise's supposed body so that her family could believe that she committed suicide. The character soon departed on 30 July 2010 when Lucas gets arrested for the murders of Trina and Owen, both of which were publicly exposed after he allowed Denise to escape and she subsequently exposed his homicidal crimes to her family - which resulted in Lucas briefly holding Denise and her family hostage until he eventually turned himself in. Lucas made a previously unannounced reappearance on 1 January 2016 before returning for a short stint in the year, in which he escaped prison until he was rearrested and left the programme again on 10 March 2016. On 1 October 2020, it was announced that Gilet was set to reprise his role, and he returned on 25 December 2020 and departed on 18 March 2021. He made an unannounced return on 31 January 2024.

During his time working on the show, Gilet has described Lucas as having "Jekyll and Hyde" aspects to his character. This multi-faceted personality was further explored in the BBC Three special EastEnders: The Two Faces of Lucas. The character also appeared in the spin-off series EastEnders: E20.

== Creation and development ==
=== Introduction (2008) ===
Gilet's casting in the show was announced in January 2008, when the character was described as "attractive, charismatic, strong and forthright" and "just a dodgy geezer with a murky past." His profile on the official EastEnders website describes him as "an upstanding member of the community, a far cry from the youth he once was." Through the show's narrative, it is revealed that Lucas is a former drug addict and has gone on to become a preacher in a Christian church.

In February 2009, it was announced that Sharon Duncan Brewster had been cast as Lucas's estranged wife Trina. Entertainment website Digital Spy reported: "Trina arrives and surprises Lucas and she makes it very clear she wants to give things another go. Lucas tries to get rid of her but his secret is out when Patrick (Rudolph Walker) sees what's going on. Just how willing will Trina be to let her husband walk into the arms of another woman? And more importantly, will she divorce him to enable him to marry again?" Despite his connection with the church, in September 2009 Lucas attempts to cover up his involvement in Trina's death. Gilet told Soaplife magazine, "When he first appeared someone wrote in saying he was a good character, but somewhere down the line something was going to come unstuck. We've always known there was more to this do-gooder than meets the eye. Things are going to get a lot darker in the build-up to Christmas. [...] It's going to get very dark and I hope I can pull it off." Lucas went on to kill Denise's ex-husband Owen Turner (Lee Ross) when he came close to discovering how Lucas was involved in Trina's death. Gilet explained that although Lucas does not want people dead and has no malice in his heart, he sees killing as a way to stop things from happening. When the show's executive producer Diederick Santer was asked by Digital Spy what was lined up for Lucas in 2010, he said "He's got right on his side, hasn't he? Is the world a better place without Trina? Probably, yes. Is the world a better place without Owen? Well, I don't know about that, but he's not a particularly nice person... Lucas is doing the Lord's work and who knows what that's doing to his head maybe he'll kill again. Lucas's story is 'poised' and we're just trying to work out the exact timing of the long-term story. There's brilliant stuff in the pipeline — it's one for a slow burn really. We have Lucas who's a murderer. Will he murder again? Who's the next person to cross him? He's one dangerous man."

=== Characterisation ===
Gilet described Lucas as having "Jekyll and Hyde" aspects to his character, and tries to hide the darker side of his personality from Denise. Gilet commented: "Every actor enjoys playing a character who's flawed – but how long can Lucas continue to hide the dark side of himself before the cracks start to show? I think a lot of people reckon the clock might be ticking. This story has shocked some people! I was getting fan mail where people were saying what a nice guy he was – and, of course, now they know he's not." Gilet has called Lucas "a very good character to play because of his complexity", explaining: "I think that's partly because he's a guy who always strives to do the right thing but his path for doing that gets warped as time goes on. I think his heart started off in the right place but - partly because of his drug-addled years - he has a slightly warped outlook on life." Asked whether he felt Lucas was truly bad, Gilet replied:

On the surface it doesn't seem that bad and he thinks he's got a good moral sense of right and wrong but if you push through and try to find what's at the kernel of who he is, you'll probably find a very angry character. He's got a lot of rage in him and he's using God as a kind of anger management that kicks him on the right track. When he has problems and his world is threatened - something he's worked so hard for over the years and he's an upstanding member of the community, people look to him and respect him - when that's threatened, when people like Trina come back into his life, it's his past returning. That's when the complexity comes in.

— Don Gilet, Digital Spy

Gilet has characterised Lucas as having a "carnal side" with which he is "constantly at odds", explaining: "There are times when that human and carnal side to him, the side that gives in to temptation, is going to come through. As time goes on, that strong moral side to him starts to chip away and this chink of darkness starts to show and unravel. It's a Pandora's box, in a way." Discussing Lucas's relationship with Denise, Gilet refuted the suggestion that Denise was a "token wife" deeming her more reliable than Trina and expanding: "He's found a woman who's strong-willed, strong-minded, a good mother to their shared child and to Libby (Belinda Owusu) and Jordan. It's kind of ideal and he's worked so hard for it. Nothing, but nothing, should stop that - he deserves to have this. It's one of these situations where he likes the idea that he's earned this relationship. That seems to be more of a priority than the pure love he has for her. He loves what he's earned and he's now this respectable person who wants to hold on to what he has by any means necessary." After Owen's body is discovered, Lucas confesses to Denise, and goes on to strangle her while quoting a line from the Bible. Complaints were received from viewers that Lucas's storyline was offensive to Christians. The BBC responded with a statement saying: "Lucas is certainly not intended to be representative of Christians. He is a very damaged and dangerous individual who has created a twisted version of the Christian 'faith' in his mind to hide behind and to convince himself that his actions are acceptable. As the story unfolds, we will see other characters questioning Lucas's claim to be a Christian. As Lucas has become increasingly unhinged, his obsession and reliance on the Bible and the scriptures has become increasingly frantic and desperate. This represents this character's emotional breakdown, and it is very clear that this is absolutely not normal behaviour. In episodes yet to broadcast, we will see the characters Grace Olubunmi, Mercy Olubunmi and Dot Branning – all three of whom are Christians – question and discuss Lucas's frame of mind." It was confirmed that Gilet would depart from the show at the end of the storyline.

In June 2010, a decision was made to reshoot scenes planned months in advance involving Lucas picking up a sex worker named Jade (Niamh Webb) who he seemingly strangles after forcing her to pray for God's forgiveness. The decision to drop the prostitute link was made following the charging of Stephen Griffiths with the murder of three sex workers in Bradford.

=== Return stint (2020–2021) ===
In October 2020, it was confirmed Gilet would reprise the role of Lucas, whose return would "cause shockwaves amongst the residents". Speaking of his return to the serial, Gilet stated: "I'm thrilled and honoured to be asked to breathe life once again into such a complex, controversial and diverse character but, most importantly to have another opportunity to work alongside one of UK's finest actors, Diane Parish. I feel blessed." On 18 March 2021, it was confirmed that Lucas' "short stint" had come to an end in the episode transmitted that day. With Lucas returning to prison, Gilet opined that he would "persevere" and use his time in prison to "repent and hopefully will use the time to better himself further because it was his choice". Gilet found the storyline "interesting" to be part of, due to the change in residents' reaction to him. He explained: "Lucas was so calculating and devious in how well he was able to hide the truth from everyone around him – this time round there's been no hiding for Lucas so even when he tried to lie, he was always caught out. So that aspect of his character has been stripped away." Gilet added that he would "never say never" to a potential return in the future.

== Storylines ==
=== 2008–2010 ===
Lucas Johnson first appears on Albert Square when his estranged daughter, Chelsea Fox (Tiana Benjamin), tracks him down to a community service - whereupon she discovers that he is a preacher. Lucas, confronted by Chelsea, explains that he was seventeen when Chelsea was born and abandoned her along with her mother Denise (Diane Parish) - as he could not cope with fatherhood. He became a drug addict but overcame his addiction and joined the church. Chelsea reluctantly agrees to give Lucas a chance, but is unhappy to learn he has a son, Jordan (Michael-Joel David Stuart). Lucas comes to Chelsea's aid when she develops a drug habit but Denise is furious to see him and tells him to stay away. Denise eventually forgives Lucas and they rekindle their relationship, becoming engaged.

Jordan reveals that Lucas is still married to his mother, Trina (Sharon Duncan-Brewster), though Lucas explains they are separated as she abandoned Jordan after he was born prematurely and addicted to heroin. Trina repeatedly tries to come between Lucas and Denise. She eventually agrees to a divorce, planning to move to Walford to be with Jordan. Lucas and Trina have sex, and during an argument, Lucas pushes her away and unintentionally causes her throat to be impaled on a rake. He leaves her to die, making it appear that she died in an accident while taking drugs. The coroner subsequently gives a verdict of accidental death.

Denise's ex-husband, Owen Turner (Lee Ross), suspects Lucas was involved in Trina's death and confronts him on his wedding day. When Owen threatens to go to the police, Lucas strangles him to death. He marries Denise and buries Owen's body in Albert Square, under a tree planted in Trina's memory. When Jordan's sheepdog, Sugar, starts sniffing around the tree, Lucas disposes of her at a nearby canal, telling his family that she ran away. Jordan is later hospitalised after being attacked by Ben Mitchell (Charlie Jones) and Lucas blames himself, leading to him suffering a breakdown. He meets a woman named Jade (Niamh Webb) in a bar and takes her to a secluded area, where he forces her to kneel and pray. Denise becomes suspicious after finding deep scratch marks on his neck, so Lucas takes her to visit Jade, who reveals that Lucas baptised her and washed away her sins. She says it will help her give up her alcohol dependence and get her daughter back. Denise tells Lucas that she is proud of what he has done.

Owen's body is discovered when Trina's tree is accidentally broken. Lucas confesses to Denise, claiming he killed him in self-defence. Denise is horrified but urges Lucas not to tell the police. He later admits that he could have saved Trina's life but chose not to, claiming that he will go to the police and tell them everything. Instead, he takes Denise to a canal, intending to baptise her. When Denise refuses to submit to God, he strangles her and fakes her suicide. Lucas murders a prostitute, Gemma Charleston (Rita Balogun), who resembles Denise, and places her body in the canal. He implicates Denise in Trina and Owen's murders, while keeping her prisoner in the basement of the empty house next door. Lucas gradually realises that his actions were wrong and allows Denise to escape. He attempts to take his family hostage, but they escape and Lucas is arrested. In his jail cell, he scratches religious messages on the wall with his finger nails, causing them to bleed. He writes "sorry" in his blood, and hands his bible to an officer, saying he will not need it where he is going. In February 2011, Denise watches as Lucas is sentenced (off-screen) to life imprisonment. She celebrates her divorce from him, but does consider visiting him in January 2013 when he sends her a visiting order.

=== 2016 ===
Six years later, after discovering Jordan has been in trouble with the police, Denise tells her daughter Libby Fox (Belinda Owusu) that she is going to visit Lucas in prison. She receives a visiting order but changes her mind. Lucas then calls Denise, asking why she did not visit him, and she tells him not to call her again, hanging up on him. However, one month later, jealous of all the couples around her and hoping to get help for Jordan, she contacts Lucas and tells him she is coming to visit him in prison. Lucas tells Denise that he has taken all responsibilities for his past actions, as he has been mentally ill and wanted to believe he was being guided by some spiritual being. Lucas admits to Denise that he is still in love with her, although she denies still being in love with him, and reveals that he is aware of Jordan being in trouble with the police. Lucas then encourages Denise to find him herself so she can help him. Denise later finds Jordan (now played by Joivan Wade) and convinces him and his son JJ Johnson (Zayden Kareem) to move in with her. Lucas then sends her flowers so Denise visits him in prison to tell him not to send her anything again and that she will no longer visit him. Lucas then asks Denise to ask Jordan to visit him, which she does. Initially, Jordan wants to visit Lucas to tell him to stay away from him, but Denise's friend Patrick Trueman (Rudolph Walker) convinces him not to, not wanting Lucas to try to control him like he did to Denise. Jordan eventually decides to visit Lucas, however, and he and Denise are persuaded to help Lucas get onto a scheme that would allow him to apply for jobs and be granted more visiting hours. After Denise gives a statement, his application is accepted, but Lucas and Jordan plan to use the scheme to help Lucas break out of prison. He uses Jordan to try to convince Denise to come with them, but when she learns what is happening, she alerts Libby who calls the police. Lucas and Jordan are both taken into custody. Denise and Patrick later visit Lucas in prison. Lucas declares that he needs Denise and she warns him never to contact her again.

=== 2020–2021 ===
Lucas returns to Walford after being released from prison on Christmas Day 2020, having reunited with his daughter Chelsea (now Zaraah Abrahams). Denise takes her son Raymond Dawkins to a Christmas service where Lucas is a speaker. Denise and Raymond leave once she realizes who he is, but Lucas follows them outside. He attempts to explain, but Denise makes it clear she is not interested. She is surprised to see Chelsea with Lucas, and urges her to return to Walford with her but she refuses. Patrick then finds Lucas and warns him off. Patrick visits Raymond's father Phil Mitchell (Steve McFadden) and requests him to scare Lucas away. Phil meets him in a restaurant and threatens him to never return to Walford. When Lucas and Chelsea are leaving the restaurant, Lucas gets beaten up by thugs. A week later, Lucas returns to the square and starts stalking Denise as he watches her with her boyfriend Jack Branning (Scott Maslen). The following day, Denise finds out what Patrick and Phil did and decides to move in with Jack. When Patrick is alone in the house, Lucas turns up to confront him, suspecting him of setting up the attack. During a heated argument, Patrick collapses and suffers a stroke. Lucas hesitantly calls for an ambulance anonymously to protect himself from being rearrested. Denise warns Lucas not to come to the square again or she will call the police. Chelsea is later seen taking a phone call from a mystery assailant, where it is revealed that she was behind Lucas's attack. Denise later finds out that Phil was not behind the attack and asks to meet Lucas so she can warn him that someone else is out to get him. Lucas agrees to stay away from Walford in order to protect Chelsea. However, Chelsea later finds Lucas sleeping rough. She tries to persuade him to move in with her but Lucas refuses. Denise later agrees to meet Lucas again. Lucas tries to convince Denise that he is a changed man, revealing that his son Jordan died from a heroin overdose. After being persuaded by Patrick and Jack, Denise later agrees to let Jack rent one of his flats in the square out to Lucas.

Lucas sees one of the men who attacked him with Chelsea and confronts him, soon realising that Chelsea is trying to set him up for drug smuggling. Chelsea later tells Lucas she is taking him on a trip to Ibiza, but he warns her that he would be breaking his parole conditions if he left the country. However, determined to carry out her plan, Chelsea lies to Lucas and tells him she has told the police about their trip and that he has been cleared to go. However, on the day of the trip, Lucas fails to turn up for their taxi. Denise finds a devastated Chelsea crying and thinks that Lucas has let her down, so goes round to the flat to confront him. While Denise has a go at Lucas, he goes into a breakdown and lashes out at Denise. Jack and Chelsea later call round to the flat and find blood on the floor and Lucas and Denise missing. After calling the police, Jack finds Lucas walking around the square and chases after him, with Callum Highway (Tony Clay) in tow. Despite Callum's requests to have Lucas arrested, Jack kidnaps him and holds him hostage in the Arches. Lucas insists he has nothing to do with Denise's disappearance. Jack tries to beat Lucas up, but is restrained by Callum. While Callum and Jack argue, Lucas escapes. Denise is later found kidnapped by an unknown assailant, who is later revealed to be Caleb Malone (Ben Freeman), putting Lucas in the clear. Caleb later lets Denise go after Chelsea agrees to return the drugs she owes him. Chelsea is forced to tell Denise about her plan. Denise is furious with Chelsea but covers for her when Jack asks what happened. Denise later tells Chelsea she will get Lucas to come back and do the job. Denise meets Lucas and tells him to go away with Chelsea. Lucas, knowing Denise and Chelsea's true intentions, starts to question why he is trying to change. He later saves Raymond from been hit by a trailer. Denise and Chelsea are grateful. Lucas talks to Denise about Chelsea's plan to set him up. Denise tells him who really kidnapped her. Lucas vows to find Caleb and kill him and steals Chelsea's phone to track him down. Chelsea warns Lucas that if he hurts Caleb, she wants nothing more to do with him. She tells him that Caleb will kill her if he goes near him and tells him to stay away from Caleb and do the job if he wants her forgiveness but Chelsea makes it clear that she will always hate Lucas for what he did. Chelsea books the flight and tells Lucas the job will be in a couple of weeks. Lucas tries to make amends with Chelsea and makes dinner for them. When Denise later tells Jack about the job, Chelsea comes on to Jack in an unsuccessful bid to try to stop him reporting her. Lucas and Denise are disappointed to hear of their daughter's recent actions and confront her. Chelsea breaks down in tears and tells Lucas she regrets what she did. Lucas later sees Chelsea and Jack arguing. Chelsea gloats about how she could have gotten with Jack if she really wanted to, leaving Lucas disappointed with her actions.

Lucas befriends Karen Taylor (Lorraine Stanley) and they arrange a date. However, Lucas lies about his true identity and uses Jordan's name. Lucas's parole officer tells him that there is a job in Newcastle. Lucas is reluctant to take it as he does not want to leave Chelsea. Karen and Lucas go on the date, but Karen soon discovers Lucas's true identity when Denise tells Karen's ex-boyfriend, Mitch Baker (Roger Griffiths) who he really is. Karen, Denise and Chelsea are furious with Lucas for his lies. Lucas lashes out at Chelsea, having had enough of her recent behaviour. While Lucas is alone, he calls Caleb, using Jordan's identity again, and arranges a job interview with him. When Caleb is not fooled by Lucas's act and insults Chelsea, Lucas threatens him with a chair. Chelsea is furious when she hears about this. Lucas loses patience with Chelsea and refuses to do the job unless she comes to church with him. Lucas tells Chelsea he wants to help her and believes she should go to the police and face up to her crimes. On the day of the job, Caleb gives Chelsea an extra package. At the airport, Lucas changes his mind about doing the job and tells Chelsea to take the drugs through herself. Chelsea does so as Lucas watches on. Security then pull Chelsea's bag aside for checking. Lucas then hands in his bag with the drugs and is arrested. Lucas later provides Jack with evidence of Caleb's crimes. The police then try to track Caleb down but are unable to find him. Chelsea later tips the police off when Caleb asks her to meet him and he is arrested. When Jack tells Lucas this and offers to get him moved to a different prison in order to protect him from Caleb, Lucas tells Jack he will get what he deserves and vows never to contact Denise again. Lucas is later beaten up by Caleb's thugs. Chelsea later visits Lucas in prison and is upset to hear what Caleb did to him, blaming herself. Lucas tells a tearful Chelsea that he wants her to walk away from any involvement with him so she can have a better life.

=== 2024 ===
Denise visits Lucas for religious guidance and in order to understand how he lives with himself with his past crimes. Having experienced guilt over assaulting Nish Panesar (Navin Chowdhry) with a champagne bottle and covering up the murder of Keanu Taylor (Danny Walters). Lucas tells a distraught Denise to confess. However, their visit ends, before she does so. As Denise's mental health continues to worsen, she visits Lucas once again. Following his reassurance, she admits to her role in the murder. Unable to get any further information, and concerned for Denise, following her paranoia about Johnny Carter (Charlie Suff), Lucas calls Jack, warning him about her mental state.

== Reception ==
The BBC received 103 complaints from viewers after it was hinted that Lucas had killed Sugar the dog, compared to "a handful" following his murders of Trina and Owen. The BBC responded saying they do not condone the killing of dogs or people, but iterated that the behaviour was in keeping with the character, adding that "no animals were harmed in the making of this story." In February 2025, Radio Times ranked Lucas as the 8th best EastEnders villain, with Laura Denby writing that Lucas showed more humanity than the other villains in the ranking: "It's rare for a villain of this calibre to show such humility, but this doesn't change Lucas's status as one of EastEnders' best ever baddies".

The character was nominated in the "Smooth Criminal" and "Killer Secret" categories at the 2010 All About Soap Bubble Awards. In January 2011, Gilet was nominated for Serial Drama Performance at the 2011 National Television Awards for his portrayal of Lucas but did not make it through to the shortlist. He was also nominated at the British Soap Awards 2010 and 2011 for 'Villain of the Year'.

== See also ==
- List of EastEnders: E20 characters
- List of soap opera villains
