= Steve Sarossy =

British actor

Steve Sarossy is a British actor. He was born in England to Anglo-Hungarian parents.

He has appeared in Doctors, Holby City, Judge John Deed, and The Bill.

He also appeared as Guy Matthews in EastEnders and in films such as Hart's War (2002) as Lt. MK Adams.
