= Victoria Woodward =

British actress

Victoria Woodward is a British theatre, radio and television actress and voice coach. She has appeared in Vital Signs, and in EastEnders as Nina Brown.

== Theatre ==
- Helena in A Midsummer Night's Dream and Luciana in Two Gentlemen of Verona at Regent's Park Open Air Theatre
- Playing for Time at Salisbury Playhouse
- Julia in The Rivals for Compass Theatre Company
- Esther in Let Esther Speak, Adam House Theatre, the Edinburgh Festival Fringe
- Celestina in The Lady of Pleasure, Marlowe Dramatic Players, Cambridge Festival Theatre
- Rachel in Happy Savages, Lyric Studio, Hammersmith,
- Titania in A Midsummer Night's Dream for the Oxford Stage Company
- The Humorous Lieutenant at Battersea Arts Centre
- The Jungle Book at Warwick Arts Centre
- Lydia Languish in The Rivals at Basingstoke Haymarket Theatre
- Veronica in Soho - A Tale of Tabledancers at the Arcola Theatre

== Radio ==
- Arden of Faversham, BBC Radio 3

== Filmography ==
- The German Lullaby (short) 2007
- EastEnders (TV series) 2006
- Vital Signs (TV series) 2006
