= Falsies =

Bra paddings to create larger breasts

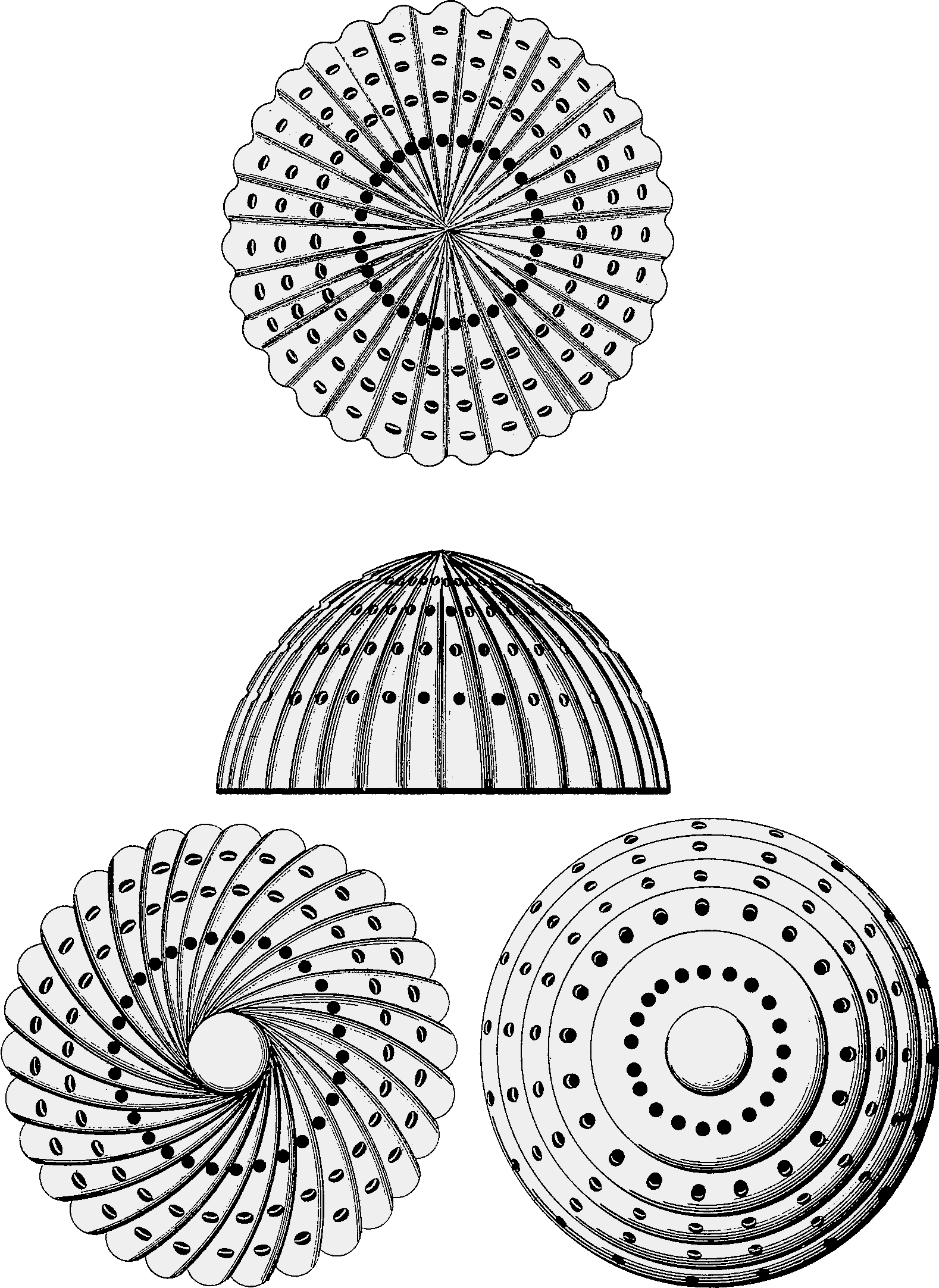
Bosom pad 1888

In fashion, falsies or bosom pads are paddings used to create the appearance of larger breasts. These may be integrated into a bra or other clothing.

The term "falsies" is also, more rarely, used for pads which create the appearance of larger buttocks. The term may also refer to refer to moulded breastplates used in drag, which are typically held onto the chest by elastic straps or forming the top part of an apron. The term usually conveys a note of humour.

== See also ==
- Cleavage enhancement
- Breast implants
