= Kellie Shirley =

British actress

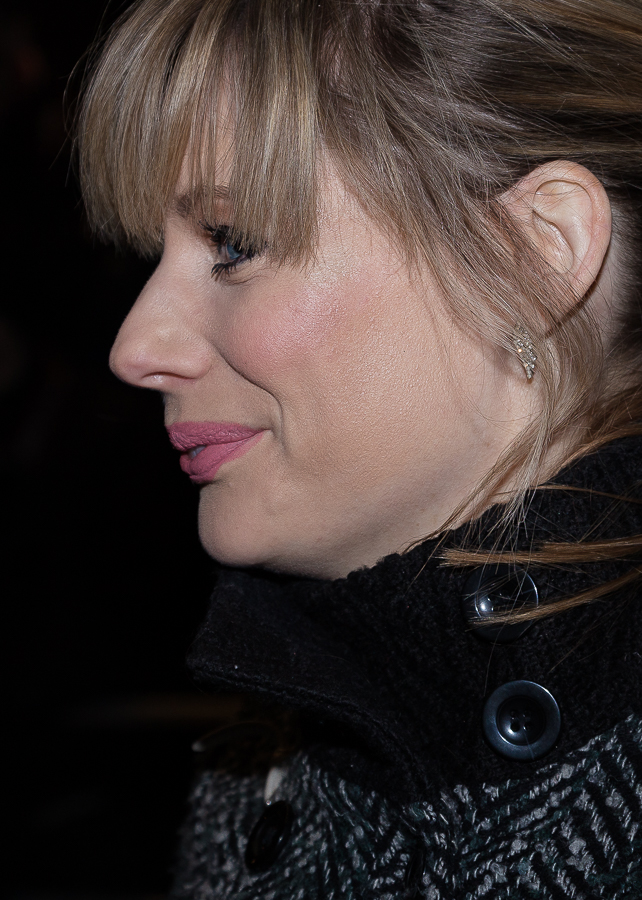
- Shirley in 2015
- Born: Kelly Jane Shirley; 11 July 1981 (age 44); Croydon, London, England
- Occupation: Actress
- Years active: 2002–present
- Spouse: Phil Davies (m. 2013)
- Children: 3
- Website: www.kellieshirley.co.uk

Kelly Jane Shirley (born 11 July 1981) is an English actress who works in film, television, theatre and radio. She is known for her roles as Kirsty De La Croix in Sky One comedy series In the Long Run and Carly Wicks in the BBC soap opera EastEnders. Shirley has also portrayed Kym in The Office and Sophia Peters in the BBC medical drama series Casualty.

== Career ==
Shirley has appeared in the film Bull, directed by Paul Andrew Williams, as well as Terence Davies' Benediction. She was selected by BAFTA to be part of their BAFTA Elevate cohort 2020/21 programme, supporting working-class talent and underrepresented groups progressing in their careers on screen. In 2024, she joined the cast of the BBC drama series Casualty, playing the role of psych liaison nurse Sophia Peters.

As well as acting, she has written a column about twin motherhood for Closer Magazine and co-hosted the BBC Two show Something for the Weekend with Tim Lovejoy, standing in for Amanda Hamilton who was on maternity leave. She also appeared as Alan Carr’s auntie Terri in Season 3 of ‘Changing Ends’ on ITV (2025).

== Personal life ==
Shirley has been married to writer Phil Davies since 2013. Together, the pair have twins and gave birth to another son in March 2023. She has won Celebrity Fundraiser of the Year on two separate accounts for raising awareness for the Anthony Nolan Charity in aid of preventing blood cancer.

In January 2019, she ran her third London Marathon with other former EastEnders actors for a Dementia campaign in honour of Barbara Windsor.

== Filmography ==
- Dr Jekyll and Mr Hyde – Mabel Mercer (2002)
- Smallpox 2002: Silent Weapon – Trish Cooper (2002)
- Whacked – Waitress (2002)
- The Bill – Alanah 2003- murdered prostitute 2 episodes
- The Office – Christmas Special – Blind Date KYM (Contestant) (2003)
- Wimbledon – Betting Shop Girl (2004)
- Twenty Thousand Streets Under the Sky – Violet (2005)
- Heidi – Tinette (2005)
- Too Much Too Young – Mandy (2005)
- Murder City – Episode 'Wives And Lovers' as Lucy Chalmers (2006)
- Coming Up (TV series) – Happy $lapz – Lisa (2006)
- Venus – Royal Court Actress #1 (2006)
- The Sick House – Joolz (2007)
- EastEnders – Carly Wicks (2006–2008, 2012)
- The Grind – Jo (2008)
- Parents of the Band – Esther (2008)
- Something for the Weekend – herself (2009)
- Lewis – Madeleine Cotton (2009)
- "Pencil Full of Lead" (music video) (2010)
- Self Centred (web series) – Lydia (2010)
- Girl on a Bicycle – Marta (2012)
- Frank – Polly (2011)
- Tangled up in Love – Bride (2011)
- Run for Your Wife – Susie (2012)
- RIOT (film 2012) – Louise
- Everyone's Going to Die (film 2013) – Ali
- Kick (film 2012) – Tracey
- Shame The Devil (film 2013) – DS Clarke
- The Marriage of Reason and Squalor (TV series 2015)
- Doctors (TV series 2016)
- Joe All Alone (TV series 2018) - Stacey
- Sunday Brunch (TV 2018) - Herself
- The Wright Stuff (TV 2018) - Herself
- In The Long Run (TV series 2018) - Kirsty De La Croix
- Ivy (Short film 2018) - Ivy
- Who’s The Daddy (TV Pilot 2018) - Rachel
- King of Thieves (Feature Film 2018) - Terri Robinson
- Snapshots (Short film 2018) - Marie
- Rock With Rudolph (Music Video) - Herself
- Call the Midwife (TV series 2018–2019) - Connie
- In the Long Run (TV series & Christmas Special; 2018–2020) - Kirsty De La Croix
- Merry Christmas Everyone (Music Video) - Herself
- Biff and Chip, series 1-3 (BBC iPlayer/CBeebies) - ‘Mum’ - Mrs Robinson.
- Bull (Signature Films/Tea Shop productions 2021) - Cheryl.
- Benediction (Emu Films, 2021) - Millicent
- Death in Paradise (BBC One 2021) - Pamela Bellman
- Meet the Richardsons (ITV Studios - series 3 - 2021) - Jean
- Ridley (ITV) - Denise
- Doctors (BBC, 2023) – Jo McLennon
- Casualty (BBC, 2024-) - Sophia Peters
- Odyssey (Stigma/Electric Shadow 2024-)
- Blockhead (Halflite 2024-)
- Bangmouth Village (Baby Cow 2024-)
- McQueen Shaven (Gobby Girl, 2024)
