= Kate Harwood =

British television producer

Kate Harwood is a British television producer. She became managing director of the revived Euston Films in summer 2014.

== Early life ==
Kate graduated from the University of Birmingham with a degree in Drama and Theatre Arts in 1981 before becoming an Arts Council Trainee director with Century Theatre, Keswick, then Literary Manager of the Royal Court Theatre in London.

== Television career ==
Harwood moved from the Royal Court to spend over 15 years working at the BBC, including as Script Editor and Script Executive, before becoming an executive producer in the BBC Drama Serials department. As a producer, she has worked on dramas including The Beggar Bride, Close Relations, The Echo, David Copperfield, Man and Boy and BAFTA winner Charles II: The Power and the Passion (released in the US under the title The Last King: the Power and the Passion of Charles II, in a heavily edited version on the A&E cable network). In her role as executive producer in BBC drama serials, she was responsible for programs including Crime and Punishment, Daniel Deronda, The Lost World, and Final Demand.

Harwood was appointed the executive producer of EastEnders in February 2005, a position she retained until October 2006, when she was succeeded by Diederick Santer. As well as being responsible for the introduction of several new families, such as the Brannings and the Foxes, she introduced such characters as Sean Slater and May Wright, as well as the departures of many popular characters such as Sharon Watts and Dennis Rickman, Chrissie Watts, Kat Moon and Alfie Moon, Sam Mitchell, Nana Moon, Jake Moon, Little Mo Mitchell, Johnny Allen and Pauline Fowler and oversaw numerous high-profile storylines, such as Pauline Fowler's murder; Billy and Honey's wedding and daughter being born with Down syndrome; and the domestic abuse storyline between Denise Fox and Owen Turner as well as the discovery of Den Watts' body under the Queen Vic. She was also responsible for such ratings-winners as Dennis Rickman's stabbing and the critically acclaimed return of the Mitchell brothers, which drew respective audiences of 12 and 13 million viewers. Other storylines, however, such as a brief lesbian affair between Sonia and Naomi, "Get Johnny Week", and the handling of Pauline Fowler's departure were not as well received, and prompted further media criticism; in July 2006, EastEnders fell to just 3.9 million viewers (although this was very-much a circumstantial, one-off figure and not at-all representative of how episodes that did not clash with Emmerdale rated), its then-lowest-ever viewing figure. Her final episode aired on 4 January 2007.

In December 2012, Harwood took the position of BBC Head of Drama, replacing John Yorke.

In March 2014, it was announced that Harwood was to leave the BBC to take up a position as managing director of Euston Films, previously a successful producer of British television drama from the 1970s to the early 1990s, then being revived as a company by owners Fremantle Media.

== Family ==
Her grandfather, Admiral Sir Henry Harwood, KBE, OBE (as Commodore) was commander of Force G during the pursuit that resulted in the scuttling of the German 'pocket battleship' Admiral Graf Spee after the Battle of the River Plate, off Uruguay, during the Second World War (these events were later the basis of the 1956 film The Battle of the River Plate). His sons Henry and Stephen both served as officers in the Royal Navy. Her brother, Anthony Harwood, as of 2006 was Head of News at the Daily Mirror, a British newspaper.

Media offices
| Preceded by Kathleen Hutchison | Executive Producer of EastEnders; 4 April 2005 – 4 January 2007 | Succeeded by Diederick Santer |
