= Tiana Benjamin =

English actress

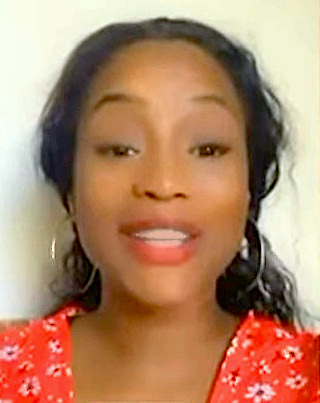
- Benjamin in 2024
- Born: Tiana Opium Benjamin
- Occupation: Actress
- Years active: 2004–present

Tiana Opium Benjamin is an English actress, known for originally playing Chelsea Fox in the BBC soap opera EastEnders.

== Early life ==
Benjamin's parents are from Sierra Leone.

== Career ==
Benjamin trained at the Anna Scher Theatre in London. In 2005, she made an appearance in the film Harry Potter and The Goblet of Fire as Angelina Johnson, and voiced the character for the video game adaptation. In 2006, Benjamin joined the cast of BBC soap opera EastEnders, portraying the role of Chelsea Fox. Her decision to leave EastEnders was announced on 2 April 2010.

In 2011, Benjamin starred in the 2011 drama film Fast Girls. She also played a role in the fourth episode of BBC crime drama The Interceptor in 2015.

In 2016, Benjamin starred in The Dumping Ground as Bailey Wharton's mother Alison.

== Filmography ==
=== Film ===
Year	Title	Role	Notes
2005	Harry Potter and the Goblet of Fire	Angelina Johnson	
2007	Wishbaby	Maxine	
2010	Thrush	Ruby's Friend	Short Film
2012	Fast Girls	Tara Andrews	
2019	The Creatress	Jessica Morrison	
2019	Absent	Angel	

=== Television ===
Year	Title	Role	Notes
2004	The Last Detective	Carleen Romane	Episode: "Christine"
2004	The Brief	Xansi Tucker	Episode: "A Sort of Love"
2004	Rose and Maloney	Scarlett	2 episodes
2004	The Bill	Tania Baptiste	1 episode
2006	Dalziel and Pascoe	Kylie Johnson	2 episodes
2006–2010	EastEnders	Chelsea Fox	Series regular
2012	Bedlam	Reeta	Episode: "Unfaithful"
2015	Casualty	Cheryl Dunsby	Episode: "The Last Goodbye"
2015	The Interceptor	Mandy	1 episode
2016	The Dumping Ground	Alison	2 episodes
2017	Holby City	Alice	Episode: "Enigma"

=== Video games ===
Year	Title	Role	Notes
2007	Harry Potter and the Order of the Phoenix	Angelina Johnson	Voice only

== Awards and nominations ==
Year	Award	Category	Result	Ref.
2007	The British Soap Awards	Sexiest Female	Nominated	
2008	The British Soap Awards	Sexiest Female	Nominated	
2008	Inside Soap Awards	Sexiest Female	Nominated	
2009	The British Soap Awards	Sexiest Female	Nominated	
2010	The British Soap Awards	Sexiest Female	Nominated	
