= Naomi Julien =

Fictional character

- EastEnders character
- Portrayed by: Petra Letang
- Duration: 2005–2007
- First appearance: Episode 2993; 15 August 2005
- Last appearance: Episode 3370; 24 May 2007
- Introduced by: Kate Harwood
In-universe information
- Occupation: Nurse
- Father: Audley Julien
- Mother: Grace Julien
- Brothers: Dion Julien

Naomi Julien is a fictional character from the BBC soap opera EastEnders, portrayed by Petra Letang. She first appeared in the show in the episode broadcast on 15 August 2005. Her storylines include a relationship with established character Sonia Fowler (Natalie Cassidy), a friendship with Garry Hobbs (Ricky Groves) and Minty Peterson and being threatened by Dr. May Wright (Amanda Drew). The character was axed in January 2007 and her final scenes were broadcast on 24 May 2007.

== Creation and development ==
In June 2005, reports surfaced that Australian actress-model Imogen Bailey unsuccessfully auditioned for the role of a new nurse, originally named Naomi Sullivan. The character's arrival and casting was announced on 23 June 2005, with Petra Letang playing the part, and the character's surname changed to Julien. It was reported on 19 January 2007 that the character had been axed and would leave the show later in 2007, and her final scenes were broadcast on 24 May 2007.

In October 2005, it was reported that Sonia Fowler will share a kiss with best friend Naomi. A source told The Mirror: "Sonia is feeling low over how badly things are going with Martin. She feels they've drifted so far apart that she barely knows him any more. When Sonia starts to blame herself for the problems, Naomi gives assurance that it's not her fault and heaps praise on her. Sonia thanks her for the kind words and Naomi admits they weren't just to cheer her up - she's fallen in love with her. To prove the point, she leans in for a hug and then kisses Sonia." Sonia returns the kiss but later regrets it when her husband Martin finds out and confronts her in The Queen Victoria.

== Storylines ==
Naomi arrives in Albert Square as Sonia Fowler's (Natalie Cassidy) nurse friend. She lives with Dot Branning (June Brown) and Jim Branning (John Bardon), then moves in with Garry Hobbs (Ricky Groves) and Minty Peterson (Cliff Parisi). Garry takes a liking to Naomi and they share a kiss, but she develops romantic feelings for Sonia. Sonia tells Naomi that she is having problems with her husband Martin Fowler (James Alexandrou) and is considering a trial separation. Naomi consoles Sonia and they kiss, but Sonia immediately regrets it. Martin blames Naomi for spoiling his marriage, and they become enemies. Naomi initially accepts that Sonia still loves Martin and remains friends with her. However, Sonia eventually leaves Martin to live with Naomi.

After a while, Sonia and Naomi argue about Sonia and Martin's ongoing battle to become their biological daughter Rebecca's (Jade Sharif) legal guardians in case of her adopted grandmother Margaret Wilson's (Janet Amsden) death. Sonia prioritises Rebecca over Naomi, so Naomi throws Sonia out and they split up. Naomi joins Dr. May Wright (Amanda Drew) working at Albert Square's surgery, and plans to buy a house with Garry and Minty. She is accepted for a job at the local children's hospital. When she discovers that May is taking pills prescribed to Manju Patel (Leena Dhingra), Naomi agrees to keep quiet but May does not believe her so plants the pills on Naomi and blames her for taking them. May tells Naomi if she does not leave Walford she will make a phone call to ruin the career for which she has been preparing for three years. Naomi pulls out of the sale of the flat and leaves even though Garry, Minty and Dawn Swann (Kara Tointon) try to get her to bring May down.

== Reception ==
Nicole Douglas from OK! wrote that Naomi "caused quite a stir" when she arrived in the soap.

== See also ==
- List of LGBT characters in television
- List of fictional nurses
