= Jase Dyer =

Fictional character from the BBC soap opera EastEnders

- EastEnders character
- Portrayed by: Stephen Lord
- Duration: 2007–2008
- First appearance: Episode 3402; 19 July 2007
- Last appearance: Episode 3638; 29 August 2008
- Created by: Diederick Santer
In-universe information
- Occupation: Carpenter; Odd job man
- Sons: Jay Brown
- Adoptive daughters: Summer Swann

Jase Dyer is a fictional character from the BBC soap opera EastEnders, played by Stephen Lord between 19 July 2007 to 29 August 2008. The character and his casting was announced mid 2007. Lord, in his first role, began filming for EastEnders in June 2007 one month before his casting announcement, and made his first episode broadcast on 19 July 2007. The character was introduced and created by executive producer Diederick Santer. Beginning in the serial on July as a man in his mid-thirties, Jase arrives as the father of Jay Brown (played by Jamie Borthwick). Jase is also described a love interest for Roxy Mitchell (Rita Simons) and Dawn Swann (Kara Tointon).

Following Jase's arrival his storylines mainly focused on him arriving and bonding with his son, being engaged to his girlfriend Dawn and his secret past, which later it is revealed he was involved in a gang and was sent to prison for his crime. Lord was nominated for the Best Newcomer category at the 2008 British Soap Awards for his portrayal of Jase, though lost out to Coronation Street's Michelle Keegan (Tina McIntyre). In an interview Lord has described his character Jase as a "enigmatic", "a dead wrong'un" and "mystery character with a dark past". It was later confirmed that the character would leave EastEnders. Jase was killed off in the serial, making his final credited appearance (as a corpse) in an episode aired on 29 August 2008, after being subsequently murdered by his antagonistic gang leader, Terry Bates (Nicholas Ball). On Virgin Media his death was named one of the best soap storylines of 2008.

== Casting and characterisation ==
Lord's casting was announced on 4 June 2007. Kris Green of Digital Spy reported Lord was cast in the recurring role of Jase Dyer, father of established character Jay Brown played by Jamie Borthwick. Lord commented on that it felt good to join the cast, while executive producer Diederick Santer stated "I am delighted that EastEnders has attracted yet another top class actor to its cast. Stephen Lord is an actor of great talent and charisma, and I hope that his character Jase will attract, intrigue and entertain the audience in equal measure." Lord stated filming his first scenes at Elstree Studios one month before his casting announcement. Nicola Methven and Polly Hudson of the Daily Mirror wrote that he would make his first screen appearance as Jase in July 2007.

Shortly after the character was announced, a show spokesperson stated "Jase is an enigmatic character in his mid thirties and arrives on the Square looking for his son. We don't know much about him, but what we do know is that he hasn't been in Jay's life for years and he was never a doting parent." They added that Jase's past is full of secrets and summed him up as "a dead wrong'un." A writer from the EastEnders website said "Jase is something of a mystery man, with a dark past." During an interview with a What's on TV writer, Lord explained that Jase comes to Walford to see his son and he admitted that both Jay and his father-in-law, Bert Atkinson (Dave Hill), are shocked by his appearance. Lord stated that it is obvious Jay is happy to see his father, but Bert is unsure. He explained "The truth is Bert doesn't really know Jase. They've not had much to do with each other. He just assumes Jase is up to no good. Well you can see why Bert thinks that – there's definitely something of the dark horse about Jase. He doesn't give much away."

The Daily Mirror describe Jase a "hunk who will soon be breaking Walford hearts". It said, "Jase hasn't been in Jay's life for years. He returns to find his boy. And, naturally, our Jase has a dark past riddled with shocking secrets". In 2007 he turns up in the Square to look after son Jay after being mysteriously absent for many years. It also adds the Jase keeps himself to himself.

In search of his tearaway son, Northern soul Jase Dyer headed south to Walford. With a past he would rather forget, it was a fresh start that Jase wanted. Keeping Jay on the straight and narrow proved to be a full-time job for the softly spoken ex-con – but he still found time for a bit of extra-curricular. It further continues, as on the BBC Online website stated he would often use the phrase "There's no point talking about it".

— the BBC on Jase (2007).

Lord further explained that Jase has not had much to do with Jay and he was not with him when his mother died of breast cancer. Jase tells Jay that he has been working on cross Channel ferries, but has finally had enough of it. Now he wants to get to know Jay and help bring him up. Lord commented "He genuinely wants to be there for Jay and be part of his life." The interviewer said Jase looked like he would be a ladies' man and Lord believed that Jase does not have any intention of attracting as many women as he can, however he does turn on the charm when he wants. Lord added that Jase is unpredictable, which makes people wary of him. Jase's profile on the What's on TV website stated that Jase preferred to keep himself to himself and that he was determined to stay on the straight and narrow, while doing the right thing by Jay.

== Development ==
In 2007, Jase's primary storyline was arriving to Walford to salvage the relationship with his son. Keeping on eye on him to make a fresh start with him. Saving Dawn's baby Summer by catching her at a first floor from a burning house window at the hands of baby-stealer borderline psychopath Dr. May Wright (Amanda Drew). Having a brief fling with Roxy Mitchell. Proposing to his girlfriend Dawn Swann realising how much he loves her. Jase was caught flirting with Honey Mitchell (Emma Barton) much to her husband Billy's (Perry Fenwick) disgust.

In November 2007 Jase is attacked on The Queen Victoria in the barrel store led by Terry Bates (Nicholas Ball) the gang leader in Jase's dark past, in which they subsequently knocked over a heavily pregnant Honey. The attack is witnessed by residents: Peggy Mitchell (Barbara Windsor), Roxy, Ronnie Mitchell (Samantha Womack), Keith Miller (David Spinx), Mickey Miller (Joe Swash), Darren Miller (Charlie G. Hawkins), Garry Hobbs (Ricky Groves) and Patrick Trueman (Rudolph Walker). A spokesperson stated "Jase is trying is hardest to turn the corner – he's paid his dues courtesy of Her Majesty but his former thuggish cronies are persistent." "Honey's terrified that something's happened to the baby and when the doctors examine her they're just as worried."

=== Notable Relationships ===
==== Jay Brown ====
Jase has not been in Jay's life for years, but he comes to Walford to track him down. Jase cares for his son despite him being estranged all those years of never doing parenting. In his profile on What's on TV stated that Jase turns up in the Square to look after son Jay after being mysteriously absent for many years. However, Jay discovers his father was in prison and goes of the rails. Jay always admired Jase because of his criminal past. Although Jase tells him not to get involved in wrong crowd and make the mistake he did, which this is many reasons why Jase is protective of his son. He is determined to stay straight and narrow down in order to do the right thing for Jay. Jase found out when Jay went missing and found him with Terry. Jase would have reacted badly and the time when Jay had a flick knife Jase took drastic measures which involves him asking why he had a weapon. Lord had explained that Jase has not had much to do with Jay and he was not with him when his mother died of breast cancer. Lord had further stated, that he wants to be there for Jay and be part of his life.

When Jase begins dating Dawn, Lord explained that "While Jase was falling for Dawn, his son was falling in with a gang of thugs". He also added "He finds out Jay has a flick knife and he's furious. He tells him how dangerous it is to carry a knife. But he still doesn't know about the gang. If he did he'd be horrified because Jase of all people knows just how dangerous gangs can be." He also added The very worst... After they vandalise Dot Branning's (June Brown) house Jay has a change of heart. He gets into a fight with one of the gang – and ends up stabbed and fighting for his life. He also mentioned that "Jay is his life and he'll feel he's failed him. He vowed to be a good dad and he'll blame himself totally. In August 2008, Jase gets into trouble with gangster Terry Bates. He sets him up and then kidnaps son Jay. The only way Jase can save his son's life is to sacrifice his own, as actor Stephen Lord explained: "Jase has been fooling himself. He thought he could do one or two jobs for Terry then walk away whenever he wanted… But when he tries his worst nightmare begins." He also added "All he cares about is saving his son. In the mayhem, Billy manages to get Jay out to safety". Lord also added, "It's brave of the show to have a character like Jase and to show the other side of him self-sacrificing his life for his son."

==== Roxy Mitchell ====
In late 2007, Jase embarked on a relationship with Roxy Mitchell (Rita Simons). After weeks of flirting between the both of them, Roxy visits Jase and kisses him. The kiss is witnessed by Dawn Swann (Kara Tointon), Roxy's rival for Jase's affections. Jase and Roxy's relationship starts to gather pace until Jay steals her engagement ring. Jase and Roxy end their relationship and Lord said that despite them having things in common, Jase's head has been turned by Dawn.

==== Dawn Swann ====
Jase's second relationship storyline with Dawn Swann (Kara Tointon) was aired in the middle of November in 2007. Tointon admitted that "On a soap you lead a double life. You get so close to people and I had formed a great friendship with Lord, who plays Jase Dyer. She explained "Whenever anybody leaves it's emotional and I did feel quite down about it". During an interview on What's on TV Lord explained "What he likes about Dawn is she's stunning. But she's also cute and has a very warm and caring nature. He feels comfortable with her and they get along well". When Jase fell for one of Dawn's "seductive" spell, they started dating in The Queen Victoria, when Dawn chose Jase over his rival for Dawn's affections, Garry Hobbs (Ricky Groves). Lord explained that "Garry and Jase are in competition for Dawn. Though to be honest Jase doesn't really see Garry as competition!, as Mo Harris (Laila Morse) set it up so Garry's wearing a red T-shirt, but Jase ends up wearing one too – and Dawn sees him first in the Vic. So she grabs him and kisses him full on! Although Jase doesn't feel sorry for Garry for the best man won. Eventually this however lead Jase to take his eye of his son, A EastEnd writer asks Lord on What's on TV is this a relationship Jase wants? Lord explained "He feels he does with Dawn. What he craves is normality for him and Jay. Jase isn't somebody who lets people get too close to him but with Dawn he's let down his guard and that's quite a big deal for him." Jase's relationship with Dawn increases when he proposed which was aired in June 2008. This eventually lead Jase to promises to have better life for Dawn.

Lord further stated that I hope it would be nice if the relationship worked out, but also mentions "Jay's a bit uncomfortable. But the real problem is that Dawn's very full-on, so Jase hasn't as much time for him and consequently Jay gets involved with a dangerous street gang." He stated the worst thing is that Jay may end up fighting for his life. Jay's stabbing was aired on 22 January 2008 during a fight. Lord explained Jay is his life and he'll feel he's failed him. He vowed to be a good dad and he'll blame himself totally. It may also make him think he's got his priorities wrong and that he should have been looking out for Jay instead of spending so much time with Dawn... He also added "After his romance with Roxy ended Jase's head has been well and truly turned. When Lord announced his exit, tragedy was brought to Dawn and the family when they find out Jase has tragically died. Lord explained in an interview that The night before the wedding he's supposed to do a job with Billy but at the last minute he's struck by the fact that he's got responsibilities and he shouldn't be doing this. He's about to get married.

=== Departure and death ===
It was reported in July 2008 on the website Inside Soap that bride-to-be Dawn will be devastated her fiancée Jase will be dead on his wedding day. Jase's death was aired on 28 August 2008, concluding his storylines in one of the shows most dramatic and horrific exits, being stabbed to death by his old boss Terry Bates (Nicholas Ball), after double crossing him in order to pay for his extravagant wedding to Dawn. Terry's tactic was to have murder in mind. The murder is being witnessed by Billy Mitchell (Perry Fenwick) who hides in the bathroom. Lord also mentioned during an interview on What's on TV "His exit was all filmed in a very dramatic and moving way with Jase imagining he's with his son as he's on the operating table". "Even as he dies he's trying to reach out and touch his son". He also mentioned "It's brave of the show to have a character like Jase and to show the other side of him. You know, the loving partner and dad". But he couldn't get away with his crimes. It's a potent ending". Lord also mentioned "It's brutal in many ways but I think it's a sweet exit". Jase made his final scene (as a corpse) on 29 August 2008. Lord mentioned during another interview that he loved the exit. The BBC defended the use of violent scenes where Jase dies following a confrontation with a group of gangsters who stabbed him after brutally beating him up. Later, the character's dead body was seen by viewers in hospital scenes which featured Jase's son Jay Brown, played by Jamie Borthwick.

In an interview in Digital Spy, Perry Fenwick admitted "It's gutting for Billy and for me." He also quoted as saying: "You will see a real similarity between these two. Here are two men so desperate to provide for their families that they have been driven down this path of violence. "Their paths collide but things go horribly wrong. I don't think Billy has thought things through. He doesn't expect to suddenly get caught up in what is effectively a gang war." Jase's profile on the BBC Online stated his death was leaving bereft Dawn and angry son Jay out for revenge when Jase died in hospital. He may be gone but never forgotten – least of all by Billy Mitchell who stood by and watched him die, and will forever live with the guilt... His death brought to the exit of another character, Honey Mitchell (Emma Barton). Billy attempts to fix his marriage, but Honey cannot trust him and leaves Walford. His death turns in devastation as Jay lashes out at Dawn as he struggles to cope with the aftermath of his father's brutal murder by a criminal gang. When Jase's fiancée Dawn asks to say a few words about him, his son Jay objects and announces to the mourners that it's her fault that his father is dead.

== Storylines ==
Jase arrives in Walford in search of his estranged son, Jay (Jamie Borthwick). He flirts with a pregnant Honey Mitchell (Emma Barton), angering her husband Billy (Perry Fenwick). When Billy finds Jase's letter regarding visits to a probation office, he tells the community that Jase is a criminal, causing them to shun him. When Jay discovers his father has been in prison, he reacts badly and is arrested for carving "LIAR" into a bus shelter, referring to Jase's lies about where he had been all his life. In wake of this, despite the initial animosity, Jase and Jay begin to bond.

Jase meets up with Terry Bates (Nicholas Ball), leader of a gang of football hooligans, who looked after Jase when he was a teenager. It is revealed Jase's involvement with the gang, led to his imprisonment. He decides that he does not want to be part of the gang any longer, as he has Jay to look after. Terry is angry about this and makes various threats to get him to reconsider. Jase refuses and Terry's gang raid The Queen Victoria looking for him. Jase is dragged into the cellar and beaten. Meanwhile, a heavily pregnant Honey calls the police and steps in to stop Jase being attacked; however, in retaliation, she is assaulted by the gang, after being caught-up in a violent siege. She goes into premature labour and gives birth to her son, Will Mitchell. Enraged by the gang attack, Jase swears revenge on Terry and threatens to kill him to gain his freedom, but he is stopped by the intervention of Phil Mitchell (Steve McFadden), who calls the police; the gang is then arrested. Phil expects repayment for his help and forces Jase to assist him in his various vendettas.

Following a brief fling with Roxy Mitchell (Rita Simons), Jase begins a more serious relationship with Dawn Swann (Kara Tointon), whom he later proposes to. He unknowingly begins working for May Wright (Amanda Drew), the woman who had planned to adopt Dawn's daughter, Summer. A violent confrontation occurs when May tries again to abscond with Summer and causes a gas explosion in Dawn's house; Jase saves Summer's life, catching her when she is dropped from a first floor window. With their house burnt down and no money, Dawn begins to fret over their financial future. Wanting to please Dawn, Jase takes a mysterious call saying he will do "one more job for him." The next day Jase brings home a bag full of money. Dawn then spends the money on various things including clothes and rent money for a new flat. Jase adopts Summer and his name is added to her birth certificate, after Dawn had left it blank when Summer was born. Dawn's demands continue, so Jase does more jobs for his associate. When he comes home beaten and bloodied, he is forced to admit to Dawn that he is working for Terry Bates once again. Dawn is initially furious, but despite realising that he is involved in criminal activity, she makes no attempt to stop him as she is desperate to keep the money and get the wedding of her dreams. Jase speaks of leaving Walford to escape Terry, but Dawn announces that they have set a date for their wedding, ensuring that Jase cannot leave.

Upon cancelling his stag night to collect £100,000 for Terry, Jase reluctantly takes Billy on as a getaway driver, revealing his intention to steal Terry's money. They agree to split the money 60/40, however upon arriving at the location of the job, there is no money, only a note stating that Terry and his men have Jay hostage and the job is a setup. When they arrive back at the flat in search of Jay, Jase and Billy are greeted by Terry and his men wielding baseball bats. Eventually, the confrontation between Jase, Terry and his men leads to violence; Jase and Billy manage to save Jay, but in the ensuing fight, Jase is brutally beaten up by Terry's men. To Billy's horror, he witnesses the assault; however, he is too frightened to help Jase and hides in the bathroom. After beating Jase up, Terry fatally stabs him. Meanwhile, Jay, hiding in the van, makes a call to Honey, who makes the call to 999. The police arrive and arrest Terry and his men, however, Jase later dies of his injuries in hospital. Dawn learns of his death on their wedding day. Jase is last seen when Jay identifies his body in the mortuary.

He is later cremated on 7 October 2008, with Jay, Dawn, Darren Miller (Charlie G. Hawkins), Garry Hobbs (Ricky Groves), Minty Peterson (Cliff Parisi) and Billy attending the funeral. Several months later, Billy eventually admits to Jay what happened on the night Jase died after being blackmailed by Nick Cotton (John Altman), who threatened to tell Jay about his cowardice. Viv Bates (Dido Miles), Terry's wife, and his gang, threaten Billy into staying away from the court case by kidnapping Jay for security measures. Billy saves him, and he finally testifies against Terry, which results in him receiving life imprisonment for Jase's murder.

== Reception ==
For his portrayal of Jase, Lord was nominated for Best Newcomer at the 2008 British Soap Awards but lost out to Coronation Street's Michelle Keegan (Tina McIntyre). A writer stated "Jase will attract, intrigue and entertain the audience in equal measure." The Daily Mirror's Nicola Methven and Polly Hudson branded Jase a "beefcake" and "the new Albert Square hunk who will soon be breaking Walford hearts." While a What's on TV writer said Jase is "broodingly sexy", "highly attractive" and that "women lust after him". Kevin O'Sullivan, writing for the Sunday Mirror, commented Jase was "another pointless newcomer". Kris Green writing for Digital Spy commented that Jase may have is eye on the women, Jane Beale (Laurie Brett) and Honey Mitchell (Emma Barton). The writer hilariously wrote his money's on Pat Evans (Pam St Clement).

Nancy Banks-Smith of The Guardian Looking on the bright side of death, it offered Jason's young son, Jay (Jamie Borthwick), a chance to steal the show, which he duly did with a touching torrent of grief. His father, a thief himself, would have been proud of him. Seventy-eight people complained about the instalment, aired on 13 November, mostly concerned about the level of violence. The BBC defended the episode. It said the storyline before the attack made it clear violence was coming and that an announcement before the show warned. The regulator has rejected 45 complaints that an episode of the BBC1 soap broadcast on 28 August had too much physical violent. The BBC itself received 134 complaints from viewers but the BBC defended the scenes on the grounds that the violence was "implied rather than explicit". Last night's episode of the BBC1 soap, a viewer saw the death of character Jase Dyer, played by Stephen Lord, with one viewer complaining that his wife was "physically sick" while his 13-year-old son was reduced to tears. 'This was the climax of a long-running story involving Jase and his former 'firm', and we believe this was the outcome that many viewers would have been anticipating in the context of this storyline. The BBC complaints stated "While we acknowledge that this was a particularly dramatic episode, we were very careful to make sure that any actual violence was implied rather than explicit, and it was made clear from the outset that Jase's life was in serious jeopardy,". The viewers appreciate that some viewers found the images of Jase's dead body uncomfortable; however, in trying to fully convey Jay's loss and depth of emotion, we felt it was necessary for viewers to see what he was seeing. However the other shows had a lot of complaints so The BBC has defended violent scenes in last night's edition of EastEnders following complaints from viewers.

Inside Soap asked their readers who they thought Roxy should be with out of Jase, Max Branning (Jake Wood), Deano Wicks (Matt Di Angelo) and Sean Slater (Robert Kazinsky). Jase was voted their favourite with thirty-nine percent of the vote.
