= Minty Peterson =

EastEnders character

- EastEnders character
- Portrayed by: Cliff Parisi
- Duration: 2002–2010, 2025
- First appearance: Episode 2269; 11 March 2002
- Last appearance: Episode 7066; 12 February 2025
- Introduced by: John Yorke (2002); Louise Berridge (2003); Chris Clenshaw (2025)
In-universe information
- Other names: Rick Peterson
- Occupation: Mechanic; Landlord
- Wife: Heather Trott (2008–2009)

Rick "Minty" Peterson is a fictional character from the BBC soap opera EastEnders, played by Cliff Parisi. He made his first appearance on 11 March 2002. In his initial appearances, he was credited with the name "Rick". His nickname was given to him because he was always late for work, turning up "after eight" when he was an apprentice mechanic. In April 2010, it was reported that the character was to be axed, and his last regular appearance was broadcast on 21 September 2010. Minty made an unannounced return on 12 February 2025 with Garry Hobbs (Ricky Groves), when they attended Billy (Perry Fenwick) and Honey Mitchell's (Emma Barton) joint stendo.

== Creation and development ==
Minty was originally scripted as a guest character in 2002. He was only due to appear in a few episodes, but actor Cliff Parisi's contract was extended and Minty was turned into a series regular. Originally scripted as a less sympathetic character than he went on to become, Minty was given a backstory linking him to the character Phil Mitchell (Steve McFadden).

Parisi has indicated that he was brought back in 2003 to be the friend of Phil, something that he enjoyed as off-screen Parisi and Phil's actor, Steve McFadden, are long-time friends. He comments, "I've known Steve for years, ever since we both started out acting, but we had never worked together before so it was terrific." When McFadden announced that he would be going on a hiatus in 2003, Parisi feared for his character's future in the serial; however, the character was kept on. Parisi commented, "I didn't know [Steve] was moving on and it was as much of a surprise to me as anyone else - partly because we don't talk about work much but also because everyone is cagey about discussing storylines, even with each other. It's all top secret. I was disappointed because I was enjoying working with him. I did think it might spell the end for Minty. I was always going to be Phil's friend so they weren't sure what to do with me. But they've kept him and I'm obviously really pleased."

Parisi has described Minty as a "Mr I-can-get-it, I-can-sort-it type". However he adds, "[Minty] never really gets round to either getting it or sorting it. His intentions are always good but he never does it properly so there's a bit of a comedy element and he has a mischievous streak to him."

Minty was paired as friends with another male bachelor, Garry Hobbs (Ricky Groves); on-screen both worked together as mechanics and eventually moved in with each other as flatmates. Storylines featuring the characters together have been typically comical, and both actors have described the two characters as "light", fun loving and drama-free, giving viewers a break from the more serious plotlines that are featured in the soap. Groves has commented, "Garry and Minty are the light in the dark. [They're] not gangsters or love triangle material. [They] break up the drama with laughs so it's not all doom and gloom. It can't all be about teenage pregnancies."

Parisi stated in 2004 that he wanted to stay with the show long-term. His last appearance was in the episode broadcast on 21 September 2010.

== Storylines ==
Minty Peterson arrives in Albert Square in March 2002 as the landlord of Kenwyn House, where he rents bedsits to troublesome tenant Janine Butcher (Charlie Brooks), her enemy Laura Beale (Hannah Waterman) and later Pat Evans (Pam St. Clement). Laura clashes with Minty over his initial insensitive behavior. Laura soon asks the square's local hardman Phil Mitchell (Steve McFadden) to speak to Minty about his frequent demands for rent, but it soon transpires that Phil and Minty are old friends.

In 2003, Minty begins to work for Phil whenever the latter needs a favor. One such matter revolves on their old gangland boss Jack Dalton (Hywel Bennett). Towards the end of the year, Phil requests Minty to help plant drugs at the nightclub owned by his top-dog adversary Den Watts (Leslie Grantham). However, the plan fails, and Den, along with his son Dennis Rickman (Nigel Harman), later gets revenge on Phil by setting him up for armed robbery, which results in Phil getting arrested for the crime. Upon realizing that he lost the feud and would potentially face a lengthy prison sentence, Phil entrusts his sister Sam (Kim Medcalf) to look after the family business and he also entrusts Minty to look after Sam for him. Phil later escapes from prison and the police issue a manhunt for him. In order to help Sam provide Phil's escape, Minty poses as Phil and tricks the police in taking him into police custody; the deceit works as Phil escapes the country and Minty is released when the police realize that they have been fooled.

In 2004, Minty helps Sam oversee Phil's business and even bonds with their cousin Billy Mitchell (Perry Fenwick). They are entrusted by Sam to keep Dennis at bay, despite their lack of putting up a challenge in squaring up to Dennis. Trouble soon emerges for Minty when Sam begins a relationship with the square's mob boss Andy Hunter (Michael Higgs), who is formerly Dalton's right-hand man and is also merely romancing with Sam just to extract control of her family's financial assets. It is at this point where Minty develops a romantic crush on Sam, but is nonetheless unable to stop her from marrying Sam as well as convincing her mother Peggy (Barbara Windsor) about Andy's ulterior motives. When Minty continues to interfere in Andy's plan to extract control of the Mitchell's finances, Andy arranges for Minty to get beaten him before he later threatens him into staying away from Sam. By the time Christmas has emerged, Sam ends up relinquishing the Mitchell's dominance on the square after Den cons her into giving him full ownership of The Queen Victoria public house. She also angers Minty by selling Phil's mechanical business, where Minty works, to his former stepson and arch-rival Ian Beale (Adam Woodyatt); in response, Minty rebukes Sam for her actions ever since she married Andy and tells her that she is now on her own. However, when Sam finally learns the truth about Andy and he kicks her out once news of her family's loss of dominance of the square becomes public knowledge, Minty takes her in and continues to defend her from Andy. Eventually, Andy ends up getting usurped and later murdered by fellow crime boss Johnny Allen (Billy Murray) – much to Minty's delight due to the way how things were bad between him and Andy.

At time goes on, Minty forms a close friendship with his co-worker Garry Hobbs (Ricky Groves) at Phil's garage. This continues after Minty rescues Garry from a suicide attempt due to the latter's loveless experiences. In the summer of 2005, Minty briefly dates a delivery woman named Emma. Garry becomes jealous of the amount of time Minty has started to spend with her. However, Emma abruptly breaks up with Minty after she realised she wasn't attracted to him. Minty pretends that he was the one to break up with her. Problems emerge in 2006 when Minty falls in love with Australian stripper SJ Fletcher (Natasha Beaumont), who Garry suspects is up to no good. Garry's suspicions turn out to be true when it turns out that SJ is planning to con Minty out of his money, although Garry discovers her schemes and exposes her to Minty. She flees the next day, leaving Minty devastated.

When Garry's mother Hazel (Kika Mirylees) comes to Walford in April 2007, Minty is attracted to her and they begin dating, despite Garry's objections. The relationship progresses quickly due to a misunderstanding that leads Hazel to believe Minty has proposed. She accepts and the wedding plans go ahead with encouragement from Heather Trott (Cheryl Fergison), who enters them into a bride and groom magazine competition so they can win their dream wedding. Hazel and Minty are selected as finalists, but in January 2008, Hazel leaves as she is becoming menopausal, and she wants Minty to find another woman to give him a child. Minty becomes depressed, but Heather convinces him to go through with the wedding so they can claim the competition's cash prize. Heather pretends to be Hazel, and soon develops feelings for Minty. In April 2008, Hazel returns, wanting Minty back. Minty refuses her, and marries Heather instead. Heather hopes that the marriage is genuine, but Minty breaks her heart a few weeks later when she catches him kissing another woman. Minty reveals that he only sees Heather as a friend, and as the marriage is never consummated, Heather arranges an annulment.

Minty attends a pottery class in March 2009 and meets Phil's old girlfriend, Manda Best (Josie Lawrence), whom he has not seen for 20 years. It is revealed that Minty had a crush on Manda in their youth, and when Manda discovers this, they begin dating. However, Minty becomes suspicious that Manda is embarking on an affair with Phil. Despite his relief that she is not, he discovers that Phil is actually having an affair with Garry's girlfriend Dawn Swann (Kara Tointon). Minty tells her, either she tells Garry or he will. Eventually Phil ends the affair, but Dawn remains in love with him. Garry eventually suspects something, and Minty finally tells Garry the truth. Garry decides to leave Walford on his boat, and Dawn chases him, declaring her love. Minty says a tearful goodbye as Dawn, her daughter Summer and Garry sail away. Manda then moves in with Minty when she is kicked out of her flat.

Minty bumps into Sam (now Danniella Westbrook) in The Queen Victoria, where she is in hiding after returning from Brazil where she has been on the run for four years, to avoid prosecution for her role in Den's murder that occurred on the same night Andy had died. Sam soon promises Minty that they will catch up and gives him her number, but he later throws it away. When Manda's son Adam (David Proud) comes to stay, he finds the number in the bin and asks Minty about Sam. He is forced to claim that they are just friends. Sam is eventually caught by the police and put in prison. Manda suspects Minty is having an affair and tells Adam, who searches for evidence and finds a letter that Sam has sent him from prison. Manda confronts Minty, and he admits that he has feelings for Sam, but says he wants a future with Manda. Hurt at this news, Manda claims that when she came to Walford, she had been hoping to reunite with Phil and has feelings for him. They end their relationship, and Manda leaves Walford.

Minty and his flatmate Darren Miller (Charlie G. Hawkins) plan to attend the 2010 FIFA World Cup final. Minty gives the tickets to Darren to look after, but they end up destroyed in the wash, when Darren leaves them in his pocket. Minty soon grows unhappy with Darren and orders him move out of the flat, before telling him he is going to South Africa anyway as he still has his flight ticket and will use Darren's cash he saved for the flight as spending money. When Minty comes back to the square, Billy informs him that he met someone there.

Later on, Minty is requested by Peggy to convince Sam to allow her mother to visit her in prison. Minty has made plans with Heather and her son George but goes to see Sam instead. During the visit, Sam - who is pregnant - collapses, and is taken to hospital. She says that Ricky Butcher (Sid Owen) is the father, but he refuses to see her. Sam says her baby needs a father, so Minty proposes to her and she accepts. Minty goes out with Heather to buy an engagement ring, but when he sees Sam again, she says she only agreed to marry him to shut him up as she was in pain. Minty returns home and talks to Heather, and he compliments her, saying she is who he wants, and they kiss passionately. He later tells Heather that their relationship will not be like it was the last time and he will always put her first. Minty and Heather meet with Reverend Stevens (Michael Keating) about a christening for George, and he asks them if they plan to marry but Minty changes the subject. Minty later catches Heather wearing her wedding dress, and later goes to talk to her about it but she reveals she is making it into a christening gown. Minty later tells Sam he will help her with her baby, Richard, any time she needs, and she later kisses him, saying he is a good man, and he reciprocates. He attends George's christening and ignores Sam's calls, but leaves the service abruptly and finds Sam outside. Heather then comes out and sees them kissing. Sam insults Heather and she leaves in tears. Minty refuses to go with Sam and returns home. Minty tells Heather he does love her and can stay if she wants, but she realises she is not what he really wants and asks him to go. He leaves the flat and phones Garry, arranging to meet him and asks if he can live with him, Dawn and Summer for a while, saying it is time to move on.

Minty and Garry return in 2025 at Billy and Honey Mitchell's (Emma Barton) joint stendo. He reveals that he is now married and Garry is living with him.

== Reception ==
In 2007, a line said by the character, referencing the Hillsborough disaster of 1989 where 96 people died in a crowd crush during a football match, received complaints. Onscreen, Minty discussed the event as part of a storyline covering football hooliganism, saying "Five years out of Europe because of Heysel, because they penned you lot in to stop you fighting on the pitch, and then what did we end up with – Hillsborough." A proportion of viewers were concerned that the programme was equating the Hillsborough tragedy to hooliganism. The Hillsborough Family Support Group (HFSG) has suggested that the scriptwriters' reference was irrelevant, with one commenting, "Hillsborough was proven not to be hooliganism. Do the BBC not realise 96 people died and many families are still suffering?". In response to the complaints, the BBC said, "Minty was actually reminding Jase [Dyer] that football hooliganism at Heysel led directly to the fencing-in of fans at football matches. He points out that this had tragic consequences - for the innocent spectators at Hillsborough. The BBC apologises if this remark was misinterpreted or caused any offence."

A storyline airing in 2008 featuring Minty and his friend Garry line dancing in cowboy outfits to traditional country and western music received complaints from actual line dancers. One line-dancer told BBC News, "Really, I think they were making a mockery of line-dancers. Line-dancing is a great form of dance, a great form of exercise - I don't like it when I see people making fun of it." Steve Healy, editor of a line-dancing website, added, "People say line-dancing isn't cool, but you've had line-dancers who have gone on to dance with Kylie [Minogue] on-stage and choreograph stage shows. Line-dancing gets kids doing some sports and off the street."

Cliff Parisi and Ricky Groves were given the "Best Double Act" trophy at the All About Soap Bubble Awards in 2007, for their portrayal as screen friends Minty and Garry. In September 2006, a writer from the Evening Standard wrote that Minty had a "hole" between his ears as he was still being conned by SJ. In 2020, Sara Wallis and Ian Hyland from The Daily Mirror placed Minty 73rd on their ranked list of the best EastEnders characters of all time, calling him a "big softy" who was "unlucky in love and life" and had "a laddish double-act bromance with Garry".
