= Rob Minter =

Fictional character

- EastEnders character
- Portrayed by: Stuart Laing
- Duration: 2006–2007
- First appearance: Episode 3174; 21 June 2006
- Last appearance: Episode 3388; 25 June 2007
- Created by: Kate Harwood
In-universe information
- Occupation: Businessman
- Wife: May Wright (until 2007)
- Daughters: Summer Swann

Rob Minter is a fictional character from the BBC soap opera EastEnders, played by Stuart Laing. He made his first appearance on 21 June 2006. Of his new role, Stuart said: "I am really excited about joining EastEnders and am thrilled to be working with the cast – I can’t wait to get stuck in." It was announced on 15 June 2007 he would leave the show at the end of his current storyline. Laing's contract was initially for a few episodes but was soon extended to six months and stayed on for a year in total and departed on 25 June 2007. He is the husband of May Wright (Amanda Drew) and father of Dawn Swann's (Kara Tointon) daughter, Summer Swann.

Rob's most notable storyline is kidnapping Dawn and handcuffing her to a bed so that his wife, May, could perform a home caesarian section in an attempt to steal her baby. This happens after Dawn fell in love with Rob and he had gained her trust. The storyline prompted over 200 complaints to the BBC as well as achieving 9.3 million viewers. Police were searching for Madeleine McCann, and the BBC had to re-write the storyline to avoid causing distress to viewers.

== Creation and development ==
=== Casting ===
The character of Rob was originally a minor part. Laing said of his casting: "I originally came up for a smaller part - for four or five episodes - and then they called me back and said there was this possibility of a character they were looking to develop, which would be in it for a longer time. I don't think they knew quite where the storylines are going, but they had a faint idea of relationships that they could establish.” Laing's character, Rob, was initially six months long and his character was not very involved in the programme in his first two months. He added: "I'd come in and do a day every couple of weeks and the story was very slow-burning, really. The writers got their teeth into the story and started to develop more and more ideas for it and that's where it started to take off."

=== Storyline development ===
"We would not wish to add to the family’s anguish at this terrible time and we are currently reviewing our storyline including episodes which have already been filmed."

— A spokesperson on the kidnap storyline

Although the kidnapping of Dawn prompted 200 complaints, the BBC had already rewritten the storyline. The original storyline was for Rob and May to kidnap Dawn's baby but because of the Madeleine McCann abduction, it was rewritten. A spokeswoman for the BBC said "The storyline involving child abduction would be "inappropriate" and could cause distress for viewers". Dawn is caught in a love triangle involving her lover Rob, and his character's wife Dr. May Wright. "Rob is currently living with Dawn and has left his wife after she attempted to buy Dawn's unborn baby, which is fathered by Rob."

Executive producer Diederick Santer commented on Laing and Drew's skills for the kidnap storyline. The producer told the news website Digital Spy: "Dr. May and Rob - Amanda Drew and Stuart Laing - have led Dawn and the audience a merry dance this year. They have both given fantastic, gripping performances and we have loved having them. We wish them both all the best for the future."

== Storylines ==
Rob first appears on 21 June 2006, when Victor Brown (Jimmy Yuill) introduces Ian Beale (Adam Woodyatt) to him at a Walford Community Charitable Trust meeting. Rob also attends a charity auction where he tries to out-bid Ian, who is bidding for a bracelet for Dawn Swann (Kara Tointon). She is posing as Ian's wife while his real wife, Jane Beale (Laurie Brett), is running the cafe that she and Ian own. After Rob raises the price, he then lets Ian buy the bracelet. Rob and Dawn start dating. He discovers "Jane" is actually Dawn but they continue their relationship. On 13 November 2006, it is revealed that Dr. May Wright (Amanda Drew), the new GP for Walford, is Rob's wife. Rob and May are separated but May wants to give their marriage another chance. Rob splits with Dawn and gets back together with May, but Dawn has become pregnant with Rob's baby. Dawn plans to have an abortion, however May, who is unable to conceive, has other ideas, and Rob and May offer to buy Dawn's baby when it is born.

Dawn agrees to this deal, but when she sees Rob and May acting like the perfect couple and learns that they have been buying things for "their" baby, she makes another appointment for a termination. Again, she doesn't go through with it, thinking Rob will leave May for her. Later May suggests to Rob that he reconcile with Dawn - desperate for the baby - she insists Rob keep Dawn sweet until she is over 24 weeks and cannot have a legal termination. Dawn, however, is unhappy that Rob intends to stay with May until she has the baby. He promises Dawn that they will be a family after the birth but she doesn't believe him and tries aborting the baby herself. Dawn ends up in hospital. Rob tries talking her round but Dawn rebuffs him so he returns to May. May later tells Dawn not to stalk Rob so Rob tells May that he is leaving her for Dawn and moves out. In revenge, May reports Rob for fraudulently obtaining a credit card for "Jane Beale", the name Dawn was using when they met. His boss suspends him and later sacks him. May leaves but later invites Rob round to apologise and tries to seduce him. Trying to leave, Rob finds the nursery May has decorated, complete with a calendar set to July with "My baby is born" written on 5th. Realising May's obsession, Rob leaves after a struggle, disturbed by May's behaviour and tells Dawn that they have to leave as soon as possible. The next day, May has a black eye and people assume Rob is responsible. He insists he isn't but after Dawn sees him attack Keith Miller (David Spinx), he admits that he did hit May.

Rob tells Dawn that he has a new job away from the Square and proposes again. She accepts and they go to his parents' house but May is there - the new job doesn't exist, being part of Rob and May's plan to take Dawn prisoner. They handcuff her to a bed and May injects Dawn with a sedative. Dawn tells May that she would rather let the baby die than give it to her, so May decides to deliver the baby herself by caesarean, intentionally putting Dawn's life at risk. When May leaves to get her surgical tools, Dawn tells Rob of May's plans and begs him to let her go. She manages to free herself and knocks Rob out. She stabs May with a scalpel before escaping in their car. Later, Rob returns to Albert Square to apologise to Dawn, but she threatens him and her family discover what he did to her. Rob tells them that he has had May sectioned, when she is actually waiting at home for him to call her. Dawn leaves to visit Keith and her mother, Rosie Miller (Gerry Cowper), Mickey Miller (Joe Swash) and Garry Hobbs (Ricky Groves) keep Rob hostage, torturing him by holding him down and pouring gravy on him and allowing their dog to lick him clean. While this is going on, they learn from Carly Wicks (Kellie Shirley) that Dawn went into labour on the tube and has delivered baby Summer in hospital. Rob is thrown out of the hospital when he tries to visit her. Despite Rob's pleas to forget their plans, May goes into the hospital posing as Dawn's GP and tries to abduct the baby, but Dawn wakes up in time and refuses to let May take her. Distraught, May runs out of the hospital and tries to run Rob down, He calls her bluff, resulting in May driving away. Rob goes to the police and tells them about the surrogacy agreement they had with Dawn. He then visits Dawn and Summer and tries to propose to Dawn, but she punches him, furious that he told the police she wanted to sell her baby. Keith drags him out of the house and he is never seen again.

When May returns in 2008, she reveals that Rob has left her and is now living with a new woman with whom he is expecting a baby.

== Reception ==
The storyline seeing Dawn handcuffed to the bed by Rob and Mad May was highly criticised by viewers.

The episode showing Dawn handcuffed to the bed grabbed 9.3 million viewers in total. In the episode, Rob lures Dawn out into the country so that May can handcuff her to the bed in order to give Dawn a home cesarean section. This episode prompted over 200 complaints to the BBC. Laing commented: "I was shocked when I read the script and my girlfriend Ali has been a bit disturbed by what I've been up to. She's enjoyed it but she's been a bit horrified at the same time! I didn't have any idea how bonkers it was going to get. [...] Rob and May were going through real problems with IVF then made some bad choices which got them spiralling into this very dark place. It's good drama and a difficult thing to pull off when it's going out at 8pm. Although we received a lot of complaints last week nobody was trying to offend people." Dawn falls in love with Rob, and he uses this to get a child for May and himself. Laing admitted it was an "intense" period, and commented: "As an actor, you've got to find a way to get your head around it. I never thought about Rob as a villain, he's just someone who makes bad choices and digs holes he can't get out of. The very last turn, when it got so extreme, I put it down to him falling out of love with Dawn and his wife having this spell on him. [...] He justifies it to himself by thinking Dawn wants to give the baby up anyway and she was going to take money for it. I think deep down he has a conscience and there is probably a part of him which is horrified but there's no going back."
