= May Wright =

Fictional character from EastEnders

- EastEnders character
- Portrayed by: Amanda Drew
- Duration: 2006–2008
- First appearance: Episode 3228; 25 September 2006
- Last appearance: Episode 3597/3598; 18 June 2008
- Introduced by: Kate Harwood (2006); Diederick Santer (2008)
In-universe information
- Occupation: General practitioner
- Sisters: Verity Wright
- Husband: Rob Minter (until 2007)
- Stepdaughters: Summer Swann

Dr. May Wright (often referred to by the media as "Mad May") is a fictional character from the BBC soap opera EastEnders, played by Amanda Drew. May appeared in the series between 25 September 2006 and 25 June 2007, and again between 6 and 18 June 2008, when she was killed off. Her storylines include the breakdown of her marriage to Rob Minter (Stuart Laing) and attempted kidnap of Summer Swann, daughter of Rob and Dawn Swann (Kara Tointon), all of which led to her eventual suicide when she caused a gas explosion.

== Creation and development ==
=== Creation ===
In preparing for her role as May, Amanda Drew met a female General Practitioner, to learn the structure of May's daily routine. She read up on In vitro fertilisation (IVF), consulting people who had undergone the procedure to gain insight into May's state of mind.

=== Personality ===
May's "deranged" personality earned her the nickname "Mad May" from the media. Amanda described the role as "a gift of a role for any actor because of her complexity." Commenting on the initial development of May's personality and motivations, Amanda explained: "When I initially met the producer and the storyline editor, we worked on May's characteristics and we created a 'super objective' for her - to fix things; which is why she became a doctor. She wants to help people and make everything right. So, in her personal life, if her 'super objective' is to fix things, then if a situation occurs where she can take control and sort it out, she will. But obviously under the influence of this emotional distress, she's following her 'super objective' to such a degree that she's acting out of all reason, away from her normal rational self and choosing to adopt the love child of her husband and his mistress. Anyone in their right mind would say 'that's crazy, that's never going to work'. Because of where she was when this situation hit her, those are the choices she made at the time. Unfortunately, because she is a driven woman, instead of doing a U-turn, she sets her sights on something and will pursue it."

=== "Summergate" ===
Discussing her early storyline, in which May and Rob conspired to steal Dawn's baby, Drew stated that the character's relationship with her husband was "fairly ambiguous", commenting that; "it was even difficult for us as actors to decide how clear it was going to come across."

In May 2007, the ending of the storyline was rewritten due to similarities to the disappearance of Madeleine McCann on 3 May. In the original scripts, May would abduct Dawn's baby soon after the birth but the plot was pulled, releasing a statement saying: "EastEnders has made the decision to substantially rewrite the storyline featuring Dawn Swann and Dr May Wright due to events surrounding the disappearance of Madeleine McCann. In the current circumstances it was felt any storyline including a child abduction would be inappropriate and could cause distress to our viewers." Drew expressed some dissatisfaction with the rewrite, stating that; "I think the ending that was originally planned was probably more shocking and perhaps more dramatically engaging", while conceding that "there was a part of me that was relieved on a personal level that I wouldn't be walking around the streets of London with people heckling me".

=== Return ===
Of her return to EastEnders, Drew stated: "I'm so excited to be playing her again. It'd be a shame to give too much away, but she has changed in many ways." Executive producer Diederick Santer said: "It's great to have Amanda back. May is a hugely popular character. I'm sure viewers will be keen to see what she gets up to and how she's changed."

Drew has discussed how the change in May since her absence was reflected in the character's appearance, explaining: "she used to be very professionally turned out and well-dressed when working as a GP. The May we now see is very different. She is dowdy and I don’t think she has had a haircut for ages. She doesn’t seem to be caring for her appearance and it shows." She deemed her return storyline: "Fantastic, very exciting and I think the writers have really brought out the complexity of May. They understand her well and have written her character in a rounded way."

== Storylines ==
May arrives in Walford, taking over from Oliver Cousins (Tom Ellis) as GP. Several weeks later, it is revealed she is married to Rob Minter (Stuart Laing) who is dating Dawn Swann (Kara Tointon). May and Rob are separated when Rob starts dating Dawn but he ends it when May asks him to give their marriage another go and they are trying for a baby by IVF. May reveals she once miscarried at six weeks before learning that Dawn is expecting Rob's baby and that her fertility treatment has been unsuccessful. The doctor tells May that she is not ovulating and therefore unlikely to conceive. Desperate for Rob's baby, May offers Dawn £10,000 to have the baby and allow her to raise her and Dawn agrees.

However, May and Rob plan to con Dawn by claiming he loves her and suggest they raise the baby together. Rob leaves May for real, filing for divorce when her behaviour becomes increasingly erratic and irrational. May reacts by taking pills intended for patients but when challenged, accuses nurse Naomi Julien (Petra Letang) of stealing the pills and forces her to leave the Square.

May seduces Rob and they reconcile. Lulling Dawn into a false sense of security, Rob proposes and she accepts. He takes her to his parents' house, where May is waiting. Rob restrains Dawn while May drugs her and threatens to perform a caesarean if Dawn does not co-operate. Dawn manages to escape, returning to the Square but doesn't stay as she knows Rob will come looking for her and leaves for the Cotswolds. However, she goes into labour on the tube and gives birth to a baby girl, naming her daughter, Summer. Dawn tells the hospital not to admit Rob but May tells the hospital staff that she is Dawn's GP and wants to leave a card for her, planning to take Summer but Dawn wakes up. May asks Dawn to let her take the baby, doubling her original offer, but Dawn refuses so May leaves alone. May later visits Dawn, asking to see Summer and offering her the toys and baby clothes she had collected during Dawn's pregnancy. Dawn calls the police and allows May to see Summer until the police arrive. She is arrested on suspicion of kidnap.

May returns using a false name, and hires Dawn's fiance, Jase Dyer (Stephen Lord), to decorate her house. She asks him about Summer and he asks if she will babysit Summer to which she agrees. On the day she is supposed to babysit, Jase arrives alone, claiming Summer has teething problems and he has to leave her with Dawn. May is so distraught that she runs out of the house in tears. The next day, Jase finds May unconscious with an empty vodka bottle. She explains to him that she lost her baby but she is with another family. Jase says she needs to see her child. May goes to Jase and Dawn's house with a gift for Summer. When May is alone with Summer, she whispers goodbye to her and says she loves her. May then decides that Dawn and Jase aren't fit to be parents. Dawn gets back and May sneaks out.

She returns on Summer's birthday, when she confronts and scares Dawn, infiltrates the Millers' home and knocks Dawn's brother Mickey Miller (Joe Swash) out with a crowbar. She locks herself, Dawn and Summer in a bedroom, breaking down and confessing she and Rob are now divorced, he is engaged to someone else and they are expecting a baby, and the police and medical authorities decided not to press charges against May, realising she was ill. She was struck off and sectioned, spending time in a psychiatric hospital. She didn't take her treatment seriously, telling the doctors what they wanted to hear so she would be released.

Dawn tries to leave but May grabs her and tears ligaments in her foot, giving Dawn medical advice as a form of taunting, continuing on from an earlier taunt claiming that Dawn cannot look after Summer properly, after discovering she applied fake suntan lotion to her for a baby beauty contest. This leads her to further taunt Dawn, by implying that she will possibly get a tattoo for Summer's 2nd birthday. May grabs Summer, calling her Sophie, and begins packing Summer's things, but Dawn distracts her and Mickey throws her out of the bedroom, locking the door after her. May tries to smash the door down with the crowbar, but finding this impossible, she goes downstairs and opens the music box she had brought for Summer. She turns on the gas, lights a cigarette causing an explosion and instantly dies.

== Reception ==
Kevin O'Sullivan, writing for the Sunday Mirror, was critical of Drew's performance as May. Discussing the character's exit, he deemed that Drew's "extreme over-acting" and "OTT guttural sobbing turned manic May into a comical, rather than frightening character."

Radio Times included May on their feature on bunny boilers. Describing her they stated: "A prime example of a sexist stereotype: a woman driven beyond distraction by her frustrated desire to be a mother."

In February 2025, Radio Times ranked May as the 10th best EastEnders villain, with Laura Denby writing that actress Drew "brought to life one of EastEnders' most unforgettable moments," in reference to May's death scene.

== See also ==
- List of soap opera villains
- List of fictional doctors
