= Garry Hobbs =

Fictional character from EastEnders

- EastEnders character
- Portrayed by: Ricky Groves
- Duration: 2000–2009, 2025
- First appearance: Episode 2003; 18 September 2000
- Last appearance: Episode 7066; 12 February 2025
- Introduced by: John Yorke (2000); Chris Clenshaw (2025)
In-universe information
- Occupation: Mechanic
- Mother: Hazel Hobbs
- Wife: Lynne Slater (2001–2004)
- Daughters: Vivienne Hobbs

Garry Hobbs is a fictional character in the BBC soap opera EastEnders, played by Ricky Groves. He made his first appearance on 18 September 2000, alongside the Slater family. It was announced on 26 March 2009 that Groves and co-star Kara Tointon, who played Dawn Swann, would be written out of the soap, and he made his final regular appearance on 27 August 2009 after nearly nine years on the show. Garry made an unannounced return on 12 February 2025 with Minty Peterson (Cliff Parisi) who attended Billy (Perry Fenwick) and Honey Mitchell’s (Emma Barton) joint 'sten' do.

== Creation and development ==
Garry was played by Ricky Groves. introduced in 2000 as part of the new Slater family, a replacement for the di Marco family. The Slaters were said to cause ructions among the already-established characters. Garry was described as having "a roving eye".

== Storylines ==
Garry comes to Walford on 18 September 2000 on the day of Ethel Skinner's Funeral, along with his girlfriend Lynne Slater (Elaine Lordan) and her family. Thinking himself a big hit with the ladies, Garry flirts with numerous women and is unwilling to settle down. Eventually he and Lynne get engaged and, on 7 December 2001, marry despite Beppe di Marco (Michael Greco) trying to stop the wedding. Beppe declares his love for Lynne but she marries Garry.

He finds work as a mechanic and lives with the Slaters. However, Lynne has an affair with her ex-fiancé, Jason James (Joseph Millson). The couple pull through and decide to try for a baby. In November 2002, Garry has a drunken one-night stand with Laura Beale (Hannah Waterman) and is stunned on Christmas Day when she tells him that she is expecting his baby.

Her husband Ian Beale (Adam Woodyatt) throws her out, assuming she has been unfaithful so Lynne takes pity on Laura and allows her to stay, much to Garry's horror, until Ian tells her that Garry is believed to be the father of Laura's baby. Lynne is distraught but eventually forgives Garry. However, the couple separate in July 2003 after Garry misses a date with Lynne to support Laura during labour. After being thrown out by the Slaters, Garry and Laura lived together, naming their son Bobby (Alex Francis), in honour of Garry's favourite footballer Bobby Moore. When Bobby needed a blood transfusion, Garry's blood group ruled him out as the biological father, leading Laura to realize that Ian was Bobby's father. On returning from hospital, Laura tried to get Ian interested in Bobby but when he refused to have anything to do with her or baby Bobby, she kept Bobby's true paternity secret because she wanted Bobby to continue believing Garry was his father.

Garry and Laura's relationship didn't last as he was still in love with Lynne and they eventually reconciled after Garry had a fling with Lynne's sister Belinda Peacock (Leanne Lakey) in November 2003, making Lynne realise that she still loved Garry. Lynne later became pregnant with his child.

After Laura's death on 30 April 2004, Bobby moved in with Garry and Lynne. Lynne struggled to accept him but was relieved when Pat Evans (Pam St. Clement) revealed that Ian was Bobby's father after finding Bobby's birth certificate. Garry was persuaded to give Bobby to Ian, devastating him; further upset occurred in July 2004, when Lynne, unconscious after a fairground accident, needed an emergency caesarean.

Lynne survived but their daughter, Vivienne, was stillborn. Unable to forgive Garry for allowing the operation, she left Walford after Vivienne's funeral. Devastated, Garry tried to commit suicide but was saved by Minty Peterson (Cliff Parisi). Garry moves in with Minty and they become good friends, surviving Garry's dislike of Minty's girlfriends...and Minty's brief engagement to Hazel (Kika Mirylees) - Garry's mother.

In November 2004, Garry is shocked when Lynne’s teenage cousin Stacey Slater (Lacey Turner) moves in with the Slaters and seduces him by kissing him on the lips, just as Lynne’s father Charlie (Derek Martin) walks in.

Garry becomes infatuated with Dawn Swann (Kara Tointon), but his attempts to make her notice him are rebuffed. Dawn dates other men and uses Garry's generosity on various occasions. Garry supports Dawn after the death of her fiancé, Jase Dyer (Stephen Lord), and, believing she has romantic feelings for him, proposes.

When Dawn refuses, he storms off, terrifying the locals when his car is found at a popular suicide spot. Fearing Garry has killed himself, Dawn realises her true feelings for him and tells a crowded Queen Vic that she loves him, only for Garry to enter and overhear. Despite her initial shock, Dawn and Garry begin dating, eventually becoming engaged but in July 2009, Dawn has an affair with Garry's boss, Phil Mitchell (Steve McFadden).

Minty finds out and tells Garry, who punches Phil and decides to leave Walford on his and Dawn's wedding day. He goes to a canal and boards the boat he and Minty have been keeping and, as he is sailing away, Dawn arrives and runs alongside, telling him how much she loves him. He docks the boat, letting Dawn and her daughter, Summer, onboard and they sail away together on 27 August 2009.

Garry returns to Walford with Minty in February 2025, when both arrive at Billy and Honey Mitchell's (Emma Barton) joint stendo. He lies that he is a football broadcaster with some wealth, however, Minty reveals that he is now a bingo caller. Minty also reveals that Dawn has broken up with Garry after a few years of travelling together, wanting a more stable life for her and Summer, and that Garry has since moved in with Minty and his new wife.

== Reception ==
For his role as Garry, Groves was nominated for "Funniest Performance" at the 2007 Inside Soap Awards. In September 2012, Inside Soap named Dawn and Garry's exit as their number 4 happy ending, "When Dawn said she'd marry Garry, we suspected it was only because of a shared obsession with having a needless double in their names. (Frankly, she could do a lot better.) But off they chugged along the Grand Union Canal to a happy future – Garry and Dawn smiling, Summer cheerfully picking her nose. We'd like to think they're still together. But it's a long shot." In 2020, Sara Wallis and Ian Hyland from The Daily Mirror placed Garry 81st on their ranked list of the best EastEnders characters of all time, calling him "Luckless" and "one of life's chancers" that received his "happy ever after" with Dawn.
