= Honey Mitchell =

Fictional character from EastEnders

- EastEnders character
- Portrayed by: Emma Barton
- Duration: 2005–2008, 2014–present
- First appearance: Episode 3050; 22 November 2005
- Introduced by: Kate Harwood (2005); Dominic Treadwell-Collins (2014, 2015)
- Spin-off appearances: The Queen Vic Quiz Night (2020)
In-universe information
- Other names: Honey Edwards; Susan Edwards
- Occupation: Laundrette assistant; Barmaid; Market Inspector; Shop assistant
- Family: Mitchell
- Father: Jack Edwards
- Mother: Janet Edwards
- Husband: Billy Mitchell (2006–2008, 2025–present)
- Sons: Will Mitchell
- Daughters: Janet Mitchell
- Aunts: Caroline Bishop

Honey Mitchell (also Edwards) is a fictional character from the BBC soap opera EastEnders, played by Emma Barton. She made her first appearance in the show on 22 November 2005. Barton was axed from the show in April 2008, and the character left the show on 2 September 2008. Barton briefly reprised the role of Honey in 2014, appearing from 27 May to 6 June 2014; however, it was later confirmed in September 2015 that the character would be making a permanent return, and Honey returned full-time from 12 November 2015. She took a break in 2020, departing on 17 January. She returned in the episode broadcast on 24 September 2020.

Initial storylines included a relationship and marriage with Billy Mitchell (Perry Fenwick), coping with her daughter Janet Mitchell (Grace) having Down syndrome, being knocked down by a car before giving birth to Will Mitchell (Toby Walpole/Freddie Phillips) and her marriage breakdown and subsequent departure. Since her return, storylines have included a reconciliation with her ex-husband Billy, their daughter, Janet, being the victim of a hit and run, the breakdown of her relationship with Billy for a second time after he cheated on her with Tina Carter (Luisa Bradshaw-White), a toxic relationship with her dentist Adam Bateman (Stephen Rahman-Hughes) which ended after he had a secret affair with Habiba Ahmed (Rukku Nahar) and several other women behind her back, which leaves her with low self esteem and suffering with bulimia. Honey enters into a relationship with Jay Brown (Jamie Borthwick), has a friendship with Suki Panesar (Balvinder Sopal) in which Suki realises she is a lesbian after she develops an unrequited crush on Honey, reunites with Billy after breaking up with Jay, supports Billy's granddaughter Lola Pearce (Danielle Harold) through her terminal brain tumor, forms a friendship with Nicola Mitchell (Laura Doddington), and becomes the target of obsession by Bea Pollard (Ronni Ancona).

== Character creation and development ==
Actress Emma Barton was chosen to play Honey Edwards in September 2005, after a successful screen test with Perry Fenwick. Barton commented, "I can't wait to join EastEnders and play Honey. She's a really sweet girl, who always wants to do the best for everyone but she's not exactly the brightest star in the sky." Barton was axed from the show in April 2008. The character is widely known as Honey, though the character's "real" name is Susan, which is sometimes used in the series.

=== Down's syndrome ===
A relationship between Honey and Billy quickly developed in late 2005 and, within two months, an upcoming baby had been written into the characters' narratives, with Honey announcing she was pregnant in January 2006. The pregnancy was the start of an ongoing storyline about Down syndrome (DS) as, in September 2006, Honey and Billy's baby Janet was diagnosed with the disorder shortly after her birth. EastEnders' producers began to work on the DS plot in February 2006. Real parents with Down's syndrome children were approached to act as consultants in the making of the storyline, meeting with writers and the actors who play Billy and Honey. On-screen, Honey was shown to be devastated, rejecting her baby and wanting to have her adopted, while Billy wanted to keep his daughter, placing strain on the couple, who married in the serial the day of Janet's birth.

The Down's Syndrome Association (DSA) worked with EastEnders on the storyline. Their medical advisers were consulted about possible health problems that Billy and Honey's baby might encounter. According to the DSA in 2006, DS people are under-represented on mainstream television and EastEnders helped to redress that imbalance. The DSA used their influence to change certain elements of the scripts that they were unhappy with, such as persuading them to change the way Billy and Honey were told of their baby's diagnosis; however, they had no influence over the characters' reactions or the plot in general. For the first two weeks after Janet's diagnosis, the DSA provided a helpline for worried parents or anyone wanting advice about DS. EastEnders also provided a link to the DSA website from theirs, to ensure that people looking for information could find the association.

The storyline was developed with characterisation in mind. Some characters, such as Peggy Mitchell, were shown to respond negatively towards the DS baby, views that were included so that the positive aspects could be voiced by the "more enlightened characters". The programme makers' main priority was to show the reality of having a child with the condition, "with all of its positives and negatives" and to "create awareness among thousands of people who know very little about Down's syndrome, who might have out-dated or prejudiced views." EastEnders took advice from DS organisations and families of DS people throughout. Care was taken to ensure that viewers empathised with Billy and Honey, to portray their journey in a "realistic way".

The DSA have expressed their desire to see a Down's syndrome character becoming a permanent member of the EastEnders cast, as in their opinion "it would be a fantastic opportunity to bring Down's syndrome into mainstream awareness, and to present a 21st century picture of family life for those who have children with the condition." In 2006, EastEnders pledged that they intended for Billy and Honey's baby to grow up as any other baby would in the soap; however, it has been noted that the plot is dependent on the actors involved, and other practical problems that could arise. EastEnders pledged to make every effort to portray "a positive image of a family who have a baby with the condition."

==== Reception of Down's syndrome storyline ====
The episodes received criticism for inaccuracy. Sue Jacob, a teacher at the Royal College of Midwives (RCM), said EastEnders presented a "poor picture of midwifery practice". During Janet's birth, Honey was refused an epidural while in pain, and later she was told that her baby had Down's syndrome alone, without her partner or family there to support her. Jacob commented, "Women are vulnerable after giving birth and they need support systems in place [...] The person caring for her is repeatedly referred to as a nurse in the episode but there is no way that a nurse would be in charge after birth. The midwife would also have been open and honest and said 'We need to get the baby checked out and we will get your partner' [...] What the soaps do is set scenes which prompt people to talk about things which are affecting their lives. We are concerned people will wrongly think this Down's syndrome story shows what really happens, and that if you have a problem there is no one there to support you. Showing something like this is not helpful." Furthermore, Jacob noted that Honey was left alone for a long time to worry about the baby, which appeared rigid, and not floppy, as babies with Down's Syndrome do. In Jacob's opinion, a midwife would have been repeatedly in and out of the room to check on the mother. Additionally, one episode showed a health visitor reprimanding Honey for refusing Down's syndrome screening and Karen Reay, director of the Community Practitioners' and Health Visitors' Association called the episode "insensitive and patronising". She added that the episode contained "glaring anomalies", giving new mothers a "fictitious and misleading" view of health visitors, which could "damage relationships with health professionals".

The BBC responded by saying, "EastEnders has undertaken a great deal of research to script the storyline of Billy and Honey giving birth to their baby daughter. EastEnders takes enormous care with its research and takes advice from experts in the given field. In addition, for this particular storyline EastEnders talked to numerous families with children who have Down's syndrome. Some of their experiences were depicted in these early episodes. Also closely involved was a senior midwife from a large UK general hospital who saw all scripts. In relation to some particular points raised, Honey was not denied an epidural – she made the choice to put herself out of reach of communicating effectively with the midwife by locking herself in the bathroom. When the news was broken to Honey and Billy that their baby had Down's syndrome, EastEnders has in fact drawn directly from one particular true-life story – and while this may indeed not be best practice it is worth saying that good drama does not necessarily come from best practice." Despite the BBC's "extensive search" to cast a real baby with Down's syndrome for the birth episodes, they were unable to do so, resulting in the shots of the newborn baby being less authentic and limited. The BBC added, "In the coming weeks Honey and Billy's child will be played by a baby with Down's Syndrome. It is worth noting that EastEnders has received incredibly positive feedback from the Down's Syndrome Association following the first few episodes, whom we are continuing to work with very closely." Carol Boys, chief executive of the Down's Syndrome Association, has confirmed that 40% of parents whose babies were diagnosed after birth were given no written or practical information about the condition, and 11% were told, as Honey was, by a midwife rather than a paediatrician: "The way in which Billy and Honey have learnt of their baby's disability, and their subsequent support from their health professionals, is not a best-practice model. However, neither is it an unrealistic situation. BBC researchers and scriptwriters have based the scenes on conversations with families who have children with Down's syndrome, and the scenes have struck a chord with thousands of our parent members across the country. Some health professionals hold outdated or prejudiced views about people with Down's Syndrome that prevent them from giving parents a balanced picture of what the future will hold for them."

=== Reintroduction ===
On 27 May 2014, Honey returned to EastEnders with her children to visit Billy. The character appeared in the episode without any prior publicity to offer viewers an element of surprise, though Executive producer Dominic Treadwell-Collins warned fans via his Twitter account that the episode would feature surprises. Frances Taylor of Digital Spy revealed that Barton had reprised the role on a temporary basis. Kilkelly later revealed that Honey's return involves her informing Billy of her plans to move overseas. But Billy is unwilling to let her take his children away. A spokesperson told him that Billy will stop at nothing to keep his family nearby, but will his next move make everything worse?"

On 6 September 2015, it was announced that Honey would be returning to EastEnders as a permanent character later in the year, following Barton's decision to reprise the role full-time following her brief return the year before. Honey made her on-screen return on 12 November 2015.

== Storylines ==
=== 2005–2008 ===
Honey is introduced in November 2005 when employed by Yolande Trueman (Angela Wynter) as a "honey trap" to see if her husband Patrick Trueman (Rudolph Walker) is willing to commit adultery. Honey causes confusion by mistaking Billy Mitchell (Perry Fenwick) for Patrick, but truth prevails, and Honey and Billy become friends. Honey has aspirations to become a model. Billy helps her find employment, acting as her manager. Billy and Honey are attracted to each other, and after a period of trepidation, they finally confess their feelings and became a couple in December 2005. The following month, Honey falls pregnant. Overjoyed, Billy proposes and despite initial objections from her father, Jack Edwards (Nicky Henson), Honey says yes. When Jack discovers that Honey is pregnant, he tries to persuade her to abort her unborn child, convinced that she would share the same fate as her mother. Not wanting to lose Honey, Billy insists that she enquire about an abortion but a check-up reveals that Honey does not have the same heart defect as her mother, so there is no danger of her dying of the same cause. Honey is furious with Jack for making her so unnecessarily fearful about her health all her life, and chastises him for not getting her heart checked when she was a child. She eventually forgives her father, and begins enjoying the prospect of becoming a mother.

Honey and Billy's first attempt at getting married in June 2006 ends in disaster when Honey is admitted to hospital, due to food poisoning. They try again in July, but due to a series of unfortunate events — starting with a prank performed on Billy's stag night — the groom doesn't get to the ceremony on time. Their third attempt in September is arranged as a surprise by Peggy Mitchell (Barbara Windsor). Honey is heavily pregnant and goes into labour, during the ceremony. As Billy leans in for a kiss after they are pronounced husband and wife, Honey reveals that her waters have broken. Honey gives birth to a girl, Janet Mitchell (Grace) (named after Honey's mother), but her happiness is short-lived when she discovers that Janet has Down syndrome. Devastated, Honey rejects her baby, changing her name to Petal, as she does not have the "perfect" Janet she had wanted. Honey and Billy go to a support group for parents of children with Down's syndrome, but this depresses Honey further. She breaks down and destroys Petal's nursery, admitting to Billy that she wants to put Petal up for adoption. Billy is against this and their relationship suffers as a result. Honey tries, but cannot accept her baby and at her lowest ebb, considers smothering Petal with a pillow, but cannot do it. Petal is fostered by Tony (Enzo Squillino, Jr.) and Kim Smith (Lorraine Arnold) in December 2006, but the next day, Dr. May Wright (Amanda Drew) tells Billy that Petal needs a heart operation. Billy arranges for Petal to be baptised in case she does not survive, and after reading a heartfelt letter from Billy to Petal, Honey decides to keep her daughter after all. She attends the baptism and informs the vicar that the baby's name is Janet. Janet's operation is a success, and Honey begins to bond with her.

In March 2007, Honey discovers she is pregnant again. Billy is apprehensive, fearing that they might love the new baby more than Janet, but Honey soon reassures him and they look forward to the arrival of the second baby. However, in November 2007, Honey is knocked down whilst trying to stop Jase Dyer (Stephen Lord) being attacked, sending her into labour. She is rushed to hospital where she gives birth to a boy, who initially appears stillborn, but is resuscitated, and is named William after his father. The Mitchells are happy until December 2007, when their landlady, Manju Patel (Leena Dhingra), threatens to evict them. Billy is unable to raise their rent money and despite attempts to barricade themselves in the flat, Mrs. Patel evicts them, leaving the entire family homeless before Christmas. They are forced to rely on relatives and friends for accommodation, before being rehoused at Walford Towers. Money becomes an issue for the Mitchells again in August 2008. Desperate, Billy takes a job as a getaway driver for Jase, who is in league with Terry Bates (Nicholas Ball), the man responsible for the pub riot that caused Honey an injury the year before. The job is a ruse, set up by Terry as revenge on Jase; Jase is stabbed and killed. Honey is devastated to learn that Billy was indirectly involved in the incident that led to Jase's death, particularly when she discovers that instead of trying to rescue Jase, Billy hid in the bathroom in fear. She is further incensed to discover that Billy has kept Jase's "blood money". She throws Billy out, only agreeing to take him back when Billy donates the money to charity. Honey tells Billy she will take him back if he promises never to lie again. Billy does so, but when Honey discovers that Billy still has some of Jase's money, she decides that she can no longer trust him. She ends her marriage and leaves Walford with their children on 2 September 2008. Honey tells Billy that she will never stop him seeing the kids because she does not want to see them suffer because of their father's mistakes. In September 2008, it is revealed that Honey and the children are now living with Honey's father, Jack. In May 2010, it is mentioned that Honey and Jack have been involved in a car crash, and Billy is given temporary custody of Janet and William. Jack dies and Honey is left in a critical condition. It is then revealed that Honey has recovered, and has resumed custody of Janet and William.

=== 2014–present ===
Honey brings the children to visit Billy and asks to meet up with him. Billy assumes it is a date and confesses his love, however Honey reveals that she wants to move to Canada for a year and take the children. Billy vows to stop her, he destroys Janet's passport and abducts her and William, but Phil convinces him to return. Honey agrees to let Janet stay with him while she takes William. She returns again to visit Billy the next year, and goes back to his flat to see Janet, but discovers Billy has stolen items in his flat (which he had moved for his cousin Ronnie Mitchell (Samantha Womack). He convinces her that he has changed, and after she listens to a voicemail message he has left for her, they have sex. Honey discovers that William's modelling contract has not been renewed and decides to move back to Walford. She then opens up to Les Coker (Roger Sloman), about not wanting to move too quickly in her relationship with Billy. Honey asks Billy to speak to Ronnie about loaning them some money so she can move into a flat nearby with Janet and William. After Billy reveals why he needs money from her, Ronnie suggests Honey and the children move in with her and her son, Matthew Mitchell Cotton, so that she is no longer alone. Honey agrees to this and they move in the following day. Honey and Billy soon get engaged again.

Honey is horrified to learn that Jay Brown (Jamie Borthwick), who lives with her and Billy, has been dealing drugs and that Billy knew this, evicting them both. She later forgives Billy and agrees to help Jay. Honey and Billy catch Jay stealing their wedding fund, so Honey reports Jay to the police and he decides to move out so that Janet and William will not go into care.

Honey comforts Jack Branning (Scott Maslen) when his wife Ronnie and her sister Roxy Mitchell (Rita Simons) drown on Ronnie and Jack's wedding day. Billy and Honey move into the flat above the funeral parlour where Billy works, and he is made a partner in the business. Honey is devastated when Janet is hit by a car and after arguing with Billy, he has sex with Tina Carter (Luisa Bradshaw-White), who was driving the car. Billy is sacked for illegally exhuming a grave, and Honey sees Billy and Tina hugging after she supports him. Honey assumes they are having an affair so Billy admits to a one-night stand. Billy and Honey split over it, leaving Billy homeless. Tina's plan for Billy to get Honey drunk, so they might get back together, backfires when she flirts with Jack instead, and when Honey nearly kisses Jack, he in turn is attacked by Billy, who then tells Honey that their relationship is special and he wants to get back together, but she vomits because of the alcohol. All attempts to reconcile fail, because she cannot forgive him for cheating on her. Honey struggles to pay her rent, so she, Janet and William move in to a house share with Billy. Billy cooks Honey a special dinner hoping it will start a reunion, but she cracks a tooth on an olive stone. She sees a dentist, Adam Bateman (Stephen Rahman-Hughes), which leads to series of dates. Billy is jealous and gives the children sweets because it is bad for their teeth, but it just leads to William vomiting on Honey. Billy later deletes messages from Adam on Honey's phone but she then changes her PIN, saying she will not let Billy spoil her time with Adam, and their relationship continues.

Adam starts an affair with Habiba Ahmed (Rukku Nahar), and when Habiba's sister Iqra Ahmed (Priya Davdra) learns of this, she tells Honey. Despite knowing about the affair, Honey continues her relationship with Adam due to the fear of being unhappy. As part of a "wife swap" event in Walford, doctor Ash Kaur (Gurlaine Kaur Garcha) stays with Honey for a few days. During her time with Honey, Ash notices symptoms of an eating disorder, and confronts her on it. Honey reveals that she began dealing with it in her teens, but it became manageable when she had kids. However, it reappeared when she began seeing Adam, and Ash tells her to seek professional help. Also during the swap, Iqra stays with Adam, where she finds out that he is seeing other woman behind Honey's back. Honey exposes Adam in the Queen Vic, before kicking him out of their flat after he mocks her bulimia, leading to her attacking him with a recycling box. For several weeks afterwards, Honey struggles with her bulimia, and eventually decides she must leave Walford and move in with her aunt while she seeks treatment for her eating disorder.

In 2020, Honey goes on a date with a man who drugs her, and she passes out in the alley. Before anything can happen, Jay scares him off and Honey is taken to hospital. She's supported through her ordeal by Jay, whom she develops feelings for. As they share their first kiss weeks later, Billy walks in horrified, and takes his anger out on Jay. Out of love for Billy, Jay does not pursue a relationship - but Jay eventually admits he would like to be with Honey, but they are overheard by Lola who warns them to tell Billy. When Honey asks to speak to him, he thinks they will get back together, but Honey shuts him down as Jay walks in. When Billy reacts badly, Honey informs him that she has not been married to him for years, and that she is happy with Jay.

== Reception ==
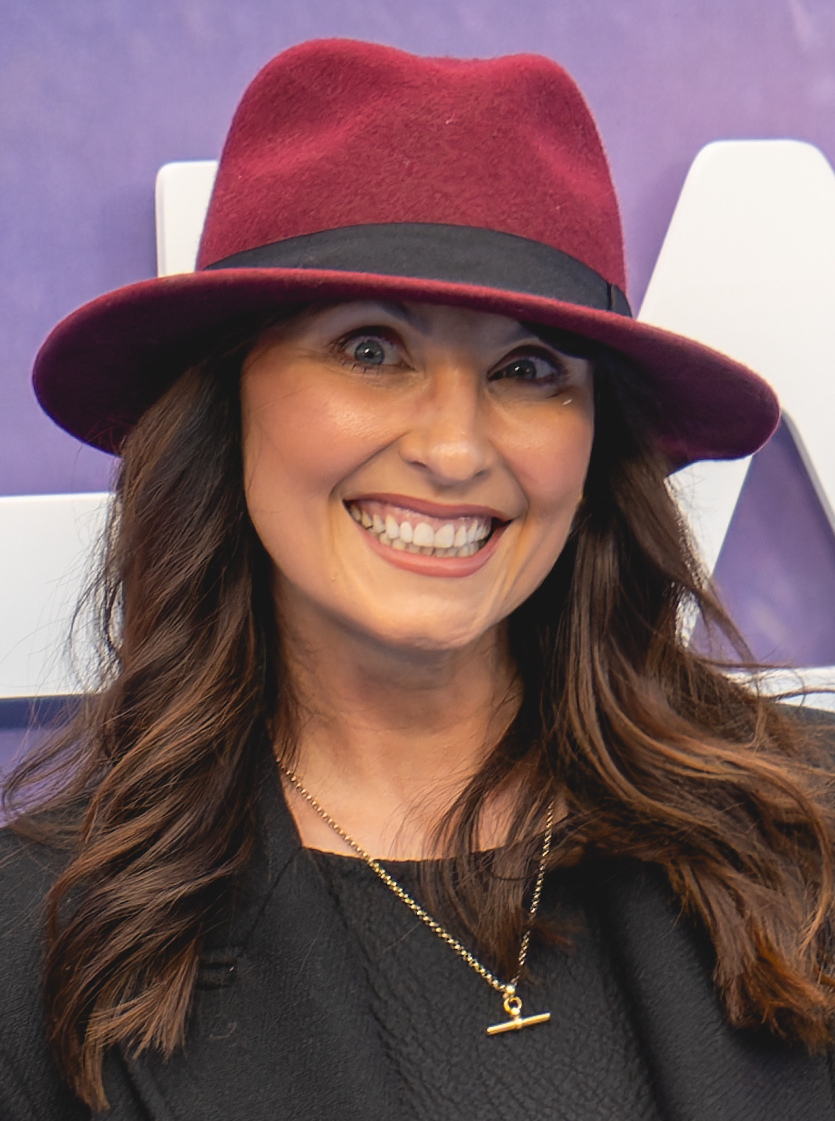
Emma Barton portrays Honey. Honey's character and storylines have been criticised by many critics.

In September 2006, Steve November, head producer of EastEnders' rival soap Coronation Street, publicly branded Honey and the Down's syndrome storyline as "Painful to watch [...] wooden and emotionless – crap." EastEnders' executive producer, Kate Harwood, defended the storyline, saying "We had incredible feedback on our Down's storyline. Fans were moved."

Grace Dent, television critic for The Guardian, described the trio of "doomed weddings" between Billy and Honey in 2006 as an excuse to watch other television programmes "without ever feeling adrift from the Walford gossip [...] It was like Groundhog Day in a Pronuptia showroom. After a series of unfortunate events, the wedding would be scuppered. Honey would sob, Billy would do one of his "I try so hard to do the right thing" soliloquys and everyone in the Vic would be forcing down marzipan-coated fruit cake for weeks." Referencing the surprise third wedding when Honey was heavily pregnant, Dent said, "No one said that springing acute stress on Honey, a heavily pregnant woman, was plainly daft [...] each 30-minute episode spent with Honey and Billy now felt like an endurance test." She has also described the coupling of Billy and Honey as akin to Billy and his former wife in the serial Little Mo Mitchell, saying "It's Billy and Little Mo all over again. Two dim-witted people, week-in, week-out, making lots of mistakes and getting the wrong end of the stick with farcical consequences. Everyone else is doing Brecht-lite, they're doing Terry & June [...] They're what the fast-forward 30x option on the Sky+ was made for."

The scenes in which Honey was attacked were subject to heavy criticism in 2007, with Ofcom receiving 78 complaints from viewers about the level of violence displayed, and concerns for the safety of her baby. The media regulatory body stated that: "In Ofcom's view the violence was not appropriately limited for this time of the evening when many children are available to view television." EastEnders was found to have breached the broadcasting code on this occasion, though the BBC defended itself by stating that there had been a gradual buildup to the event over several episodes, and that a content warning was aired prior to the episode's broadcast.
