= Dawn Swann =

Fictional character from EastEnders

- EastEnders character
- Portrayed by: Kara Tointon
- Duration: 2005–2009
- First appearance: Episode 3017; 26 September 2005
- Last appearance: Episode 3848; 27 August 2009
- Introduced by: Kate Harwood
In-universe information
- Occupation: Barmaid
- Father: Mike Swann
- Mother: Rosie Miller
- Stepfather: Keith Miller
- Brothers: Mickey Miller
- Half-brothers: Darren Miller
- Half-sisters: Demi Miller
- Daughters: Summer Swann
- Grandmothers: Nora Swann
- Uncles: Clint
- Nephews: George Trott
- Nieces: Aleesha Miller

Dawn Swann is a fictional character from the BBC soap opera EastEnders, played by Kara Tointon, who first appeared on 26 September 2005. It was reported on 26 March 2009 that Tointon and co-star Ricky Groves, who plays Garry Hobbs, would be written out of the soap and the character made her final appearance on 27 August 2009. Dawn has been described as a tart with a heart character. In 2007, the character was involved in a storyline where Dawn was kidnapped and held hostage by Dr. May Wright (Amanda Drew) and Rob Minter (Stuart Laing); their intention being to give her a forced caesarean section and take the baby. Originally, the storyline would have included a child abduction; however, due to the real-life suspected kidnapping of a 3-year-old girl, Madeleine McCann, who went missing in the Algarve in May 2007, the BBC removed the child abduction from the scripts.

== Creation ==
In June 2005, an official BBC press report announced the upcoming arrival of the character — Dawn Swann, a member of the Miller family: "Dawn Swann is Mickey Miller's (Joe Swash) sister. Aged 23, Dawn has been travelling for the last few years and is currently living in France where Mickey goes to see her. A real charmer with a touch of the Footballers' Wives about her, she oozes charisma and sex appeal." It was revealed that Dawn was to be played by actress Kara Tointon. Of her new role, Tointon said, "EastEnders is my dream job and I feel blessed with this opportunity. Dawn is sexy, independent and has this amazing wardrobe — I can't wait to start filming."

The character was introduced in September 2005, in a special week of off-set episodes, filmed on location in France. In the storyline, Mickey travelled to France to meet Dawn and discovered that she is living with their estranged father Mike — a conman who ultimately lets his family down and flees, resulting in Dawn's return to Walford. Upon moving to Walford, Dawn immediately conned the residents of Albert Square to fund her breast enhancements. As Dawn's breast size is bigger than Kara's, the actress is required to wear gel-filled padded bras and "chicken fillets".

== Development ==
=== Characterisation ===
Dawn has been described as the soap's "tart with a heart" character. Discussing her character, Tointon told the Sunday Mirror in October 2005, "I love playing Dawn. She's so flirty and confident — nothing fazes her and she knows how to flutter her eyelashes and make the men do whatever she wants." Tointon has suggested that she models Dawn on model Jordan aka Katie Price. She said in 2008, "My character is so optimistic. She is a girl who believes in herself and says what she thinks. But sometimes I read the script and think, 'Oh no' - so I look at the way Jordan reacts to stuff. No matter how bad things get, nothing seems to be a problem for her - everything is positive. I’ve watched her on TV and thought, 'Good luck to you, that's how Dawn should be'. It would be great if Dawn was as successful as she is, though."

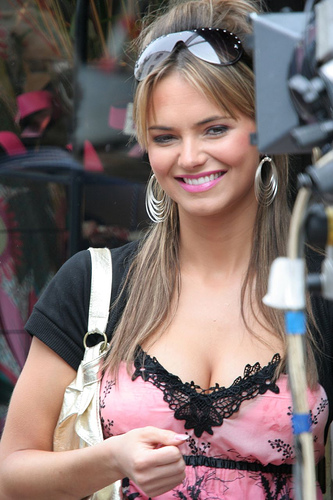
Kara Tointon portrayed Dawn

=== Love triangle and pregnancy ===
Dawn's first prominent storyline began airing in 2006, when she started dating a married man, Rob Minter (Stuart Laing), and fell pregnant with his baby. In a plot twist, Rob's wife, Dr May Wright (Amanda Drew), was unable to conceive, facilitating a storyline that saw her attempt to buy Dawn's unborn baby. Over Dawn's pregnancy, a series of events were aired in which Dawn was conned into believing that she and Rob had reunited, when he was really conspiring with May to get custody of the baby and prevent Dawn aborting it. Plots saw the character May grow increasing erratic and obsessed with the unborn child, until the climax in June 2007, when Dawn was kidnapped and held hostage by May and Rob, their intention being to give her a forced caesarean section and take the baby.

The storyline received focus in the British media at the time, due to a reported last-minute rewrite of scripts. Originally, the storyline would have included a child abduction; however, due to the real-life suspected kidnapping of a 3-year-old girl, Madeleine McCann, who went missing in the Algarve in May 2007, the BBC removed the child abduction from the scripts. They commented, "It was felt any storyline that included child abduction would be inappropriate and could cause distress to our viewers." Originally, it was intended for Dawn to give birth to a baby and then have the child snatched by May, leaving Dawn bereft. On-screen, May's plan to take Dawn's baby failed when Dawn had her arrested.

=== Relationship with Garry Hobbs and departure ===
An unrequited love storyline was featured in Dawn's narrative. Garry Hobbs, played by Ricky Groves, continuously attempted to woo Dawn, to no avail. In October 2008, Tointon revealed that she wanted to see Dawn and Garry unite as a couple: "Fingers crossed as I really enjoy working with Ricky Groves. My mum wants [them] to get together. And people come up to me on the street and they’re all rooting for [them]. I think Dawn is coming to realise that Garry has been the one rock who is always there."

In March 2009, it was announced that Tointon, along with Groves, had been axed from the show, as producers had decided not to renew her contract. Tointon said she was excited about her exit storylines, but was also reportedly upset by the axing, saying "I was heartbroken when they told me and I have to admit I did cry. I just have to dust myself down and get back out there. I've already told them that if they do plan to kill Dawn, I will refuse to close my eyes in the dying scenes." She said she felt sad for Dawn after hearing she would embark on an affair with Garry's boss, Phil Mitchell (Steve McFadden), but understood that it was probably right for her contract to not be renewed, as she hadn't had many storylines in 2008, saying "you can only go as far as your storylines take you." Following the axing, executive producer Diederick Santer said, "Dawn and Garry have some fantastic stuff to come — this spring and summer sees their love truly put to the test — and they go with our thanks and very best wishes." After the exit was aired, Tointon said she did not think it was very good: "Well it was interesting on the boat. Well... it was better than leaving in a black cab. When I watched it, I didn't think it was very good. But I did my best." She later admitted that the show's producers were probably right to axe the character and she was getting annoyed that Dawn did not learn from her past mistakes. Dawn made her final appearance on 27 August 2009.

== Storylines ==
Dawn had a complicated start in life. Her father, Mike (Mark Wingett), deserted her when she was six. She left home at 16, disapproving of her mother Rosie Miller (Gerry Cowper) for her relationship with her partner Keith (David Spinx). In 2005, she reacquainted herself with Mike in France. She moves to Walford after Mike's property scam fails, and lives with Rosie. Claiming she needs money for a medical operation, she cons her neighbours into paying for her breast implants. Mike comes to Walford, and when his mother Nora (Pamela Cundell) dies, she leaves £5,000 to Rosie. Mike persuades Dawn to pose as Rosie to get the money, and tells Dawn they will start afresh in Spain, but he takes the money and leaves alone.

After a failed attempt at a modelling career, Dawn finds employment as a barmaid. Ian Beale (Adam Woodyatt) employs her in 2006, paying her to pose as his wife to impress business associates. During a function, she meets Rob Minter (Stuart Laing) and they begin dating. She knows he is separated but Rob ends their relationship when his wife May Wright (Amanda Drew) wants to give their marriage another chance. Dawn discovers she is pregnant with Rob's child and plans to have an abortion. May, who is unable to conceive, asks Dawn to sell her the baby for £19,000. Dawn agrees, taking extravagant gifts and money in the process, but never intends to give the baby to May, and when Rob rebuffs her advances, she again plans to have an abortion. In order to stop her, May forces Rob to reignite his affair with Dawn, their real plan being to take the baby after Dawn gives birth. Rob eventually cracks under the pressure of the deception, confessing May's plan. In revenge, Dawn tries to force a miscarriage, but is unsuccessful. Rob is forced to prioritise, and leaves May for Dawn. May plays numerous vengeful tricks on them, getting Rob sacked, restricting their money, and evicting them from their flat.

Dawn is held hostage by Mad May and Rob (2007)

However, Rob and May team up again, and Rob proposes to Dawn, suggesting they move away. He takes her to an empty house where she is handcuffed to a bed and is held hostage while May plans to perform a caesarean section. Dawn escapes after attacking Rob and returns to Walford, but goes into labour on the London Underground, later giving birth to a girl, Summer. While Dawn recovers in hospital, May sneaks into her room and tries to abduct Summer but Dawn catches her. Despite Rob's pleas, Dawn refuses to take him back, and May is arrested while attempting to see Summer.

Dawn struggles with parenting initially, leaving the care of Summer to her family, unable to accept the responsibility of being a full-time mother. Her friend Garry Hobbs (Ricky Groves) proves a strong ally, helping Dawn care for Summer. She is happy to accept his help, but he decides to propose during a trip to Brighton, and she turns him down. Dawn also hit it off with a local shopkeeper named Matt. Garry walked in on them getting cosy in the hotel room, but Matt ran a mile when he realised Dawn had a baby. It soon transpires that local resident Jase Dyer (Stephen Lord) has also shown a romantic interest in Dawn; both men compete for her attention and she chooses Jase, devastating Garry. Jase proposes in June 2008 and she accepts; however, when Dawn starts favouring Summer over his son Jay Brown (Jamie Borthwick), whom she clashes with on many occasions, Jase postpones the wedding.

In the midst of their arguing, Dawn is shocked to discover that May has returned, having had psychiatric treatment. Jase has unwittingly been working for May under her pseudonym Jenny, part of her renewed plan to steal Summer. May breaks into the Millers' house, knocks Dawn's brother Mickey (Joe Swash) unconscious and locks Dawn in her bedroom, accusing her of being a bad mother. During a scuffle, Dawn breaks her ankle and May attempts to leave with Summer but Mickey intervenes. Devastated, May deliberately causes a gas explosion, killing herself. Mickey and Summer get out, but Dawn passes out from the smoke. She nearly perishes, but Keith enters the burning building and carries her to safety. At the hospital, Dawn thanks Keith for his heroics and they reconcile after she learns from him that May is dead.

While her ordeal with May is over at last, Dawn struggles to settle her financial future with Jase. This soon forces Jase to work for his former gang boss, Terry Bates (Nicholas Ball), in order to satisfy Dawn's monetary desires. When she discovers that Jase is involved with Terry's gang, Dawn makes no attempt to stop him - desperate as she is for money to finance her dream wedding. The situation climaxes on Dawn's hen night, when Jase is set up by Terry, who stabs him before he and his gang are eventually arrested. Jase later dies in hospital. Dawn, who has realised that materialistic things are unimportant, discovers Jase's death on the wedding day. Jay blames Dawn for his father's death and rejects her. Dawn is distraught and turns to Garry for support, offering sex to him in a moment of vulnerability, but he turns her down. Dawn nearly leaves Walford following Jase's funeral, but Garry convinces her to stay and so she moves in with him. Jay continues to antagonise Dawn, posting petrol soaked rags through her letter box. At first Dawn angrily confronts Jay, but her guilt fully emerges after Jay again states that she is the reason Jase worked for Terry and is therefore responsible for his death. Dawn eventually manages to convince Jay that she loved Jase and thinks of Jay as family, so they call a truce.

At some point, Garry again proposes to Dawn. She reacts unhappily as she is still distraught about Jase, and Garry is left downbeat by this. He later steals a car and flees. The police soon find the car abandoned by cliffs in Dover, prompting them to speculate that Garry has committed suicide. Dawn believes she is in love with Garry and declares this at his memorial service, only to be startled when he walks in. He gives her an ultimatum: be his girlfriend or he will leave Walford for good. Choosing the former, Dawn becomes his girlfriend and they agree to make plans for their wedding after dealing with Terry's trial for Jase's murder. She gives evidence and Terry is eventually found guilty, being sentenced to life imprisonment.

After finally getting justice for Jase's murder, Dawn starts her wedding plans with Garry. However, she embarks on an affair with his boss Phil Mitchell (Steve McFadden). Their secret is soon discovered by Minty, and Dawn is unnerved when Minty promises to tell Garry unless she tells him quickly. Instead, she resolves to spare Garry's feelings and goes to stay with her mother for a while. When Dawn returns, she resumes her affair with Phil until he eventually ends their relationship. Minty again threatens to tell the truth when Garry suspects that Dawn doesn't love him. Garry and Dawn talk, and they announce their engagement at The Queen Vic. Just as Garry prepares to marry Dawn, however, Minty reveals her affair with Phil. Heartbroken, Garry punches Phil and then confronts Dawn for cheating on him with his boss. He then jilts Dawn, quits his job, and decides to leave Walford for good. Dawn is persuaded to go after him, and sees him sailing off at a canal. She runs alongside telling Garry that she loves him. Dawn is initially regretful when Garry states that he is leaving Walford anyway, but then surprises her by proposing that she and Summer come with him - thereby implying that he still loves her. Dawn agrees, and he lets her and Summer on the boat. As they sail out of Walford together, Garry and Dawn kiss while their observing friends say goodbye.

During a brief return from Mickey on 9 December 2024, it is revealed that Dawn now works alongside himself and their mother, Rosie, at their family business of eco-friendly B&Bs in the Cotswolds, Miller's Villas.

When Garry and Minty return on 12 February 2025 for Billy and Honey's joint stendo, Minty reveals that Dawn and Garry had been travelling the world with Summer for a few years but have since split up due to Dawn wanting a more stable life for her and Summer.

== Reception ==
In June 2007, 80 people complained to the BBC following the airing of a storyline that saw a pregnant Dawn chained to a bed by Dr May Wright, with her intention being to give her a forced Caesarean section. It has been noted by the media that no specific warning about the content of the episode was given by the broadcaster; however, a continuity announcer said before the episode began, "Dramatic EastEnders now on BBC1 - it's misery for poor Dawn as mad May puts her evil plan into action."

A BBC spokesman said, "Last night's episode involving the characters Dawn, May, and Rob reached the climax that many viewers would have been anticipating. We are sorry if some people were offended by this drama unfolding, and will be addressing complaints fully in due course." It was stressed that of the typical 9 million viewers who watched EastEnders, only 80 people complained. However, The Guardian reported that 200 viewers complained, 183 complaints to the BBC and a further 12 to the media regulator, Ofcom. The episode garnered an average audience of 8.9 million viewers and a 42% share to BBC1.

For her role as Dawn, Tointon was nominated for "Best Actress" at the 2007 Inside Soap Awards. Tointon was awarded the "Sexiest Actress" in 2008 for her role as Dawn Swann; it was the second time she won the award. Tointon was also nominated for a National Television Award in 2007 for "most popular actress".

In 2009, Ruth Deller of entertainment website lowculture.co.uk, who runs a monthly feature of the most popular and unpopular soap opera characters, criticised Dawn, branding her as a 'spare part', also stating: "There is a fair bit of dead wood in Walford at the moment, and most of it is centred around Garry, Minty and their associates. Of all of those, Dawn serves the least purpose. With no family in the square and with Jay living with Billy rather than her, isn't it time she was sent away for some happy ending or other? If she can take Garry with her, so much the better." Upon Dawn's exit, Deller once again criticised her stating: "Thankfully, after several years of hanging around being spare parts (was Dawn ever anything other than a spare part?), Garry and Dawn departed this month in the least plausible exit scene ever."

In September 2012, Inside Soap named Dawn and Gary's exit as their number 4 happy ending, "When Dawn said she'd marry Gary, we suspected it was only because of a shared obsession with having a needless double in their names. (Frankly, she could do a lot better.) But off they chugged along the Grand Union Canal to a happy future — Garry and Dawn smiling, Summer cheerfully picking her nose. We'd like to think they're still together. But it's a long shot." In 2020, Sara Wallis and Ian Hyland from The Daily Mirror placed Dawn 94th on their ranked list of the best EastEnders characters of all time, calling her "gorgeous" and "the most beautiful woman ever to set foot in Walford" who had "some major storylines before sailing off into the sunset with Garry".
