= A Prince Among Men =

- Created by: Tony Millan; Mike Walling
- Starring: Chris Barrie; Timothy Bentinck; Susie Blake; Francesca Hunt; Cliff Parisi; Samantha Power; Bryan Pringle
- Composer: Jamie Marshall
- Country of origin: United Kingdom
- Original language: English
- No. of series: 2
- No. of episodes: 12

Production
- Running time: 30 minutes

Original release
- Network: BBC1
- Release: 15 September 1997 – 14 June 1998

A Prince Among Men is a British sitcom that ran on BBC1 from 15 September 1997 to 14 June 1998, broadcasting 12 episodes over two series. It starred Chris Barrie as Gary Prince, a former international football star turned entrepreneur. The theme music was by Jamie Marshall. The sitcom was not well received.

== Transmissions ==
Series	Episodes	Originally released	
Series	Episodes	First released	Last released
1	6	15 September 1997	20 October 1997
2	6	5 May 1998	14 June 1998

== Episodes ==
=== Series 1 (1997) ===
No. overall	No. in series	Title	Directed by	Written by	Original release date
1	1	"Whose Life Is It Anyway?"	Mike Stephens	Tony Miland and Mike Walling	15 September 1997
2	2	"Changing Revs"	Mike Stephens	Tony Miland and Mike Walling	22 September 1997
3	3	"Where Were They Then?"	Mike Stephens	Tony Miland and Mike Walling	29 September 1997
4	4	"Monkey Business"	Mike Stephens	Tony Miland and Mike Walling	6 October 1997
5	5	"Family Matters"	Mike Stephens	Tony Miland and Mike Walling	13 October 1997
6	6	"A Matter of Degree"	Mike Stephens	Tony Miland and Mike Walling	20 October 1997

=== Series 2 (1998) ===
No. overall	No. in series	Title	Directed by	Written by	Original release date
7	1	"Walk Right Back"	Mike Stephens	Tony Miland and Mike Walling	5 May 1998
8	2	"Ghost Story"	Mike Stephens	Tony Miland and Mike Walling	12 May 1998
9	3	"The Good Samaritan"	Mike Stephens	Tony Miland and Mike Walling	19 May 1998
10	4	"All in the Game"	Mike Stephens	Tony Miland and Mike Walling	31 May 1998
11	5	"Injury Time"	Mike Stephens	Tony Miland and Mike Walling	7 June 1998
12	6	"Who's That Girl?"	Mike Stephens	Tony Miland and Mike Walling	14 June 1998
