= Amanda Drew =

British actress (born 1969)

- Born: 21 December 1969 (age 56); Boston, England, United Kingdom
- Education: King's School; Royal Academy of Dramatic Art
- Occupation: Actress
- Years active: 1992–present

Amanda Drew (born 21 December 1969) is a British actress from Boston, England, with extensive credits in theatre, television and film.

== Biography ==
One of four children, Drew was born in Boston. Drew's mother was a nurse and her father was a vicar. When her parents moved to Leicestershire for work, Drew was educated at Beauchamp College in Oadby, where she joined a youth theatre, playing Charity in Sweet Charity. She later attended King's School, Ottery St. Mary, when her family moved to Devon.

After graduating from RADA in 1992, Drew made her name on stage at the Royal Court Theatre and various other West End productions in both drama and comedy roles. In 2001, she joined the Royal Shakespeare Company.

In March 2009 she starred in the UK premiere of Parlour Song at the Almeida Theatre. In July 2009 she took the role of Claudia Roe, a fictional amalgamation of female executives of the failed Enron Corporation, in ENRON at the Minerva Theatre, Chichester, transferring to Royal Court Theatre in October 2009 and the West End in January 2010. She made her Broadway debut in Florian Zeller's play The Height of the Storm in 2019.

Her television credits include A Very British Scandal, The Girl Before, Broadchurch, The Last Post, Chernobyl, Wednesday, and the Black Mirror episode "Smithereens". In 2025, Drew starred in The Bombing of Pan Am 103 (also known as Lockerbie) as a victim's mother. In real life, the incident took place on Drew's 19th birthday.

=== EastEnders ===
Drew played the part of Dr. May Wright in the BBC One soap opera, EastEnders, between September 2006 and June 2007, and again in June 2008. Drew was involved in one of largest storylines of the year, a love triangle between May, her husband Rob Minter (Stuart Laing), and Dawn Swann (Kara Tointon).

The personality of the character has earned her the nickname "Mad May" and "Psycho Doctor" from the media. Drew has described the role as "a gift of a role for any actor because of her complexity." Of her return to EastEnders, she has stated: "I'm so excited to be playing her again. It'd be a shame to give too much away, but she has changed in many ways." Executive producer Diederick Santer has said: "It's great to have Amanda back. May is a hugely popular character. I'm sure viewers will be keen to see what she gets up to and how she's changed."

In May 2007, it was decided that the ending of a current storyline featuring characters of May, Dawn and Rob would be substantially rewritten due to the disappearance of toddler Madeleine McCann. The storyline would have seen May ran off with Dawn and Rob's baby shortly after it had been born. The move attracted some criticism as to how it relates directly to the disappearance of the toddler; the BBC said that "In the current circumstances it was felt any storyline that included a child abduction would be inappropriate and could cause distress to our viewers." May holds Dawn hostage, intending to steal her baby by performing a caesarean section. May is arrested and Drew left the series.

Trailers for Drew's return to EastEnders, had been shown in the weeks running up to her return on BBC channels; on 6 June 2008. She reprised her role as May, under the assumed name of "Jenny". She was seen smoking a cigarette and drinking alcohol, two new activities for the character. May was killed-off on 18 June 2008 when she causes a gas explosion at the Miller house.

=== Awards ===
Drew won the "Outstanding Newcomer" at the 2003 London Evening Standard Theatre Awards for her performance in Eastward Ho! at the Gielgud Theatre.

== Filmography ==
=== Film ===
Year	Title	Role	Notes
1997	Remember Me?	Woman Police Constable	
1997	Mrs Dalloway	Lucy	
1999	This Year's Love	Old Friend	
2004	Between Us	Lukas' Mother	Short film
2008	The Other Man	Joy	
2010	Jerusalem	Kate Blake	Short film
2012	Elfie Hopkins	Susannah Hopkins	
2012	Anonymous	Helen	Short film
2014	Charity	Mum	Short film
2015	Blue Borsalino	Donna	Short film
2018	A Private War	Amy Bentham	
2021	The Hitman and Her	Mrs. Pierce	Short film
2023	Drift	Sonia	

=== Television ===
Year	Title	Role	Notes
1992	Between the Lines	Angela	Series 1; episode 9: "Watching the Detectives"
1993	Full Stretch	Natasha	Episode 1: "Ivory Tower"
1993	Performance	Daisy	Series 3; episode 2: "The Maitlands"
1993	Paul Calf's Video Diary	Emma	Television film
1994	The Bill	Mrs. Sanders	Series 10; episode 26: "Business as Usual"
1994	Soldier Soldier	Nurse Siobhan Mitchell	Series 4; episodes 3 & 4: "Damage" & "Second Sight"
1995	The Bill	Heather Carney	Series 11; episode 86: "Presumed Guilty"
1995	Degrees of Error	Cordell Hospital Nurse	(unknown episodes)
1998	The Bill	Kay Richards	Series 14; episode 72: "Stop"
1998	Men Behaving Badly	Wendy	Series 7; episodes 1–3: "Performance", "Gary in Love" & "Delivery"
2002	Spooks	BBC Woman	Series 1; episode 5: "The Rose Bed Memoirs". Uncredited role
2002	Tough Love	WDC Jilly Barnes	Television film
2003	M.I.T.: Murder Investigation Team	Ruth Taylor	Series 1; episode 6: "Lambs to the Slaughter"
2003	The Bill	Annabelle Jameson	Series 19; episodes 81 & 82: "Antecedent" & "Fatality"
2004	No Angels	Dr. Jane Salter	Series 1; episode 5
2005	The Golden Hour	Peta Larkinson	Mini-series; episode 3
2006–2008	EastEnders	Dr. May Wright	Regular role; 97 episodes
2008	HolbyBlue	Judy Burrows	Series 2; episodes 4–6
2011	Britain's Fattest Man	Herself - Narrator	Television film
2011	Midsomer Murders	Liz Gerrard	Series 13; episode 7: "Not in My Back Yard"
2012	When Paddy Met Sally	Herself - Narrator	Television film
2012	Switch	Janet	Episodes 1, 2, 4 & 5
2012	Paddy and Sally's Excellent Gypsy Adventure	Herself - Narrator	Episodes 1–4: "Spain", "Hungary", "Ireland" & "Borneo"
2013	Silent Witness	DI Reed	Series 16; episodes 3 & 4: "Trust: Parts 1 & 2"
2013	Life of Crime	Beverley Reid	Mini-series; episodes 1–3: "1985", "1997" & "2013"
2013	New Tricks	Laura Highsmith	Series 10; episode 1: "The Rock: Part One"
2013	Southcliffe	Jacqui Whitehead	Mini-series; episodes 1–4
2013–2015	Broadchurch	Cate Gillespie	Series 1; episode 6, & series 2; episode 1 & 3–6
2014	The Passing Bells	Annie Edwards	Mini-series; episodes 1–5
2014	Horizon	Herself - Narrator	Series 51; episodes 8 & 13: "Where Is Flight MH370?" & "Inside the Dark Web"
2017	The Last Post	Mary Markham	Mini-series; episodes 1–6
2018	Trust	Belinda	6 episodes
2019	Father Brown	Miss Cynthia Rosewood	Series 7; episode 4: "The Demise of the Debutante"
2019	Chernobyl	Kremlin Aide Female	Mini-series; episodes 2 & 3: "Please Remain Calm" & "Open Wide, O Earth"
2019	Black Mirror	Hayley	Series 5; episode 2: "Smithereens"
2019	Master Moley: By Royal Invitation	Tracey / Signora Maria / Melanie (voice)	Television short film
2019–2020	The Trial of Christine Keeler	Julie Ellen Payne	Episodes 2–6
2020	Criminal: UK	Alex's Solicitor	Series 2; episode 2: "Alex"
2020–2025	Gangs of London	Miss Kane	Series 1–3; 6 episodes
2021	Doctor Who	Voice of the Mouri (voice)	Series 13: episode 3: "Flux: Chapter Three - Once, Upon Time"
2021	The Girl Before	Carol Younsen (Psychotherapist)	Mini-series; episodes 1–4
2021	A Very British Scandal	Yvonne MacPherson	Mini-series; episodes 1–3
2021–2024	The Outlaws	Ruth	Series 1–3; 11 episodes
2022	Vampire Academy	Diane	5 episodes
2022	The Peripheral	Mrs. West	Episode 3: "Haptic Drift"
2022	Wednesday	Esther Sinclair	Season 1; episode 5: "You Reap What You Woe"
2023	The Power	Mrs. Elms	Episode 3: "A New Organ"
2023	Wolf	Supt. Harper Driscoll	Mini-series; episodes 1 & 5: "Watching" & "Death Roll"
2023	The Lazarus Project	Dr. Harrison	Series 2; episode 6
2023–2024	The Gold	CS/Asst. Commissioner Cath McLean	Series 1; episodes 1–6, & series 2; episode 1
2024	Eric	Caroline	Mini-series; episodes 4 & 5
2024	Ellis	DCI Cotton	Series 1; episode 3: "Brindleton"
2025	A Cruel Love: The Ruth Ellis Story	Bertha Neilson	Mini-series; episodes 1–4
2025	The Bombing of Pan Am 103	Linda Burman	Mini-series; episodes 1–6
2025	Lynley	Valerie	Episode 1. Post-production
2025	Bookish	Nerina Bean	Episodes 3 & 4: "Deadly Nitrate: Parts 1 & 2". In production

=== Video games ===
Year	Title	Role	Notes
2018	Hitman 2	Nancy Burnwood (voice)	

== Selected stage appearances ==
- The Memory of Water
- The Man of Mode (1994)
- The Way of the World (1995)
- John Gabriel Borkman (1996)
- Taking Sides (1997)
- The School of Night (1999)
- The House of Bernarda Alba (1999)
- Top Girls (2000)
- Jubilee (2001)
- Eastward Ho! (2002)
- The Island Princess (2002)
- Blithe Spirit (2004)
- Otherwise Engaged (2005)
- Parlour Song (2009)
- ENRON (2009–2010)
- House of Games (2010)
- Butley (2011)
- Twelfth Night (2011)
- A Streetcar Named Desire (2012)
- Three Days in the Country (2015)
