= Cliff Parisi =

English actor

- Born: Clifford R Manley; 24 May 1960 (age 66); Poplar, London, England
- Occupations: Actor; businessman
- Years active: 1982–present
- Television: EastEnders (2002–2010, 2025); Call the Midwife (2012–present); I'm a Celebrity...Get Me Out of Here! (2019)
- Partner: Tara Wyer (2009–present)
- Children: 4

Cliff Parisi (born Clifford R Manley; 24 May 1960) is an English actor and businessman, known for his roles as Minty Peterson in the BBC soap opera EastEnders and Fred Buckle in the BBC period drama Call the Midwife. In 2019, he participated in the nineteenth series of I'm a Celebrity...Get Me Out of Here!.

== Career ==
Parisi began his career in 1982 when he started touring the United Kingdom as a stand-up comedian. He continued working as a stand-up comedian for a further seven years before being cast in the 1989 film Queen of Hearts. Parisi then appeared in television series such as The Bill, Chancer, Kavanagh QC, Bramwell and A Prince Among Men. He then auditioned for the role of Minty Peterson in the BBC soap opera EastEnders. His storylines in the series involved forming a close friendship with Garry Hobbs (Ricky Groves) and finding love with established characters Heather Trott (Cheryl Fergison) and Manda Best (Josie Lawrence). He made his final appearance on 21 September 2010.

In 2012, Parisi filmed a guest role in the Channel 4 soap opera Hollyoaks, playing the character of Walt. He also starred as a guest in the BBC drama Hustle, playing the character of Arnie. Since 2012, Parisi has starred in the BBC period drama Call the Midwife, appearing as Fred Buckle. In 2014, he appeared in the fifth and final series of the British sitcom Outnumbered, as Ed Poll. In 2019, he participated in the nineteenth series of I'm a Celebrity...Get Me Out of Here! and was the third contestant to leave.

== Personal life ==
Parisi has five children, two with his partner, BBC producer Tara Wyer, and three from previous relationships. He is the owner of his own gents luxury skincare company Manley and Moosh.

== Filmography ==
- Queen of Hearts (1989) – Manager
- A Bit of Fry & Laurie (1990)
- Can You Hear Me Thinking? (1990) – Biker
- KYTV (1990, 1993)
- Chancer (1990) – Lunchbox
- The Pleasure Principle (1991) – Police Officer
- Boon (1991) – John Preston
- The Guilty (1992) – Cliff
- Gone to Seed (1992) – Robin
- Sean's Show (1992) – Police Officer
- The Darling Buds of May (1993) – Bill Jackson
- The Upper Hand (1993) – Gary
- Bermuda Grace (1994) – Gary Foster
- London's Burning (1994) – Mickey Wright
- Drop the Dead Donkey (1994) – Paramedic
- Under the Moon (1995) – Clifford
- N7 (1995) – Alvin
- Kavanagh QC (1995–2001) – Tom Buckley
- Bramwell & Bramwell II (1995–1996) – Daniel Bentley
- Glam Metal Detectives (1995) – Security Guard
- Pie in the Sky (1996) – Inspector Dave Smith
- A Prince Among Men (1997) – Dave Perry
- The Man Who Knew Too Little (1997) – Uri
- Our Boy (1997) – Jeff
- The Saint (1997) – Pub Waiter
- Paul Merton in Galton and Simpson's... (1997) – Sprott
- Kiss Me Kate (1998) – Tony
- From Hell (2001) – Bartender
- Hot Money (2001) – Bob Hoodless
- Casualty (2000) – Paul Farrell
- Sunburn (2000) – Reggie Roach
- EastEnders (2002–2010, 2025) – Minty Peterson
- Helen West (2002)
- Bedtime (2002)
- Waking the Dead (2003) – Tony King
- The Bill (2003) – Anthony Spall
- Hustle (2012) – Arnie
- Call the Midwife (2012–present) – Fred Buckle
- Hollyoaks (2012) – Walt
- Outnumbered (2014) – Ed Poll
- Plebs (2014) – Fulvio
- I'm a Celebrity...Get Me Out of Here! (2019) – Himself
- All Those Small Things (2021) – Nick
- The Good Ship Murder (2025) – Buddy
