= Laura Beale =

Fictional character from EastEnders

- EastEnders character
- Portrayed by: Hannah Waterman
- Duration: 2000–2004
- First appearance: Episode 1909; 17 February 2000
- Last appearance: Episode 2720; 30 April 2004
- Introduced by: John Yorke
In-universe information
- Occupation: Childminder; Chip shop assistant; Entrepreneur
- Family: Beale
- Father: Norman Dunn
- Mother: Edwina Dunn
- Husband: Ian Beale (2001–2004)
- Sons: Bobby Beale
- Stepsons: Peter Beale; Steven Beale (adoptive)
- Stepdaughters: Lucy Beale

Laura Beale (also Dunn) is a fictional character from the BBC soap opera EastEnders, played by Hannah Waterman. She first appeared on 17 February 2000 and became a regular on the programme until the character was killed off on 30 April 2004. This was Waterman's second role in the soap, having appeared in 1997 as an HIV patient. Following her debut in the show's 15th anniversary special, Laura embarked on a relationship with local businessman Ian Beale (Adam Woodyatt); he originally hired her to care for his children, but they later got married in 2001, after Laura helped Ian overcome his financial bankruptcy ordeal. Their marriage soon fell apart, however, after Laura had an off-screen one-night stand with next-door neighbour Garry Hobbs (Ricky Groves), before giving birth to a baby named Bobby, whose father turned out to be Ian, despite her initial belief that Garry was the father due to Ian's vasectomy. Soon afterwards, Laura was placed in dire financial straits after a feud with her sworn enemy, Janine Butcher (Charlie Brooks). The follow-up to their last confrontation resulted Laura's death, when she fatally tripped down the stairs, breaking her neck; in a departure that became listed as one of EastEnders' best exits by Virgin Media.

== Creation and development ==
=== Casting ===
On 6 January 2000, it was announced Waterman would be joining EastEnders as Laura Dunn, a nanny hired by Ian Beale (Adam Woodyatt) to care for his children. It was also reported "romance could be on the cards" for Laura and Ian. Waterman previously appeared in EastEnders in 1997 as an HIV patient. Shortly after she joined the show, Waterman began to be recognised by members of the public and she commented "It can be quite intimidating when people stare at me in the street, so I've resorted to doing what I never dreamed of before – wearing a baseball cap to go shopping. It's interesting being on the show, especially with dad being a Cockney. And I'd love to work with him one day. So far, I've avoided it in case I was accused of using his name to get on, but now we joke about working together on EastEnders. I can just picture him behind the bar at The Queen Vic!"

=== Relationship with Ian Beale ===
Waterman said there were perks to playing a couple at war in TV soaps." "After a day of nagging Adam and moaning about just about everything, I feel fantastic by the time I get home," she laughs. "If Laura's having a bad day that usually means I finish off the day in a great mood. It's a very cathartic experience being a misery-guts for a living." She continues: "I don't know if she'll forgive him but I doubt she'll throw Ian out. Laura has shifted from being this naïve and soft person into a much harder and more manipulative character. That's what happens when you live with Ian Beale for too long." Talking about how Laura manipulated Ian, Waterman commented: "I wouldn't be surprised if she uses Ian's guilt to get her way," she says. "She desperately wants a baby. Now she may be in a position to demand she gets her way. Laura's love for Ian has been tested lately. Her love for him is far less than her desire to have a baby and that's going to be a problem for Ian."

=== Departure and death ===
On 22 December 2003, it was announced Waterman was to leave EastEnders, and her character was killed off after falling down the stairs, shortly after a fight with Janine Butcher. A spokeswoman for the show said Laura's exit would spark "a succession of devastating events throughout Walford." Waterman revealed she was glad Laura was going to be killed off and that she has to move on from EastEnders. She explained "These are my last scenes, but they're so dramatic. Though I've had a fabulous time, I've got to move on." Waterman also stated that she could not wait for Laura to be killed off. She expressed that she wanted to do other work, particularly with her father, Dennis Waterman, saying "I've never worked with him before. And he's not unhappy I'm leaving. EastEnders has been a fantastic learning curve but I can't play that character any more."

== Storylines ==
Laura Dunn first appeared in Albert Square when she is employed by local businessman Ian Beale (Adam Woodyatt) to work as a nanny for his children, Peter (Joseph Shade), Lucy (Casey Anne Rothery) and Steven Beale (Edward Savage). She becomes attracted to Ian but her attempts to get closer to him are unnoticed. Laura is protective of Ian and eventually he starts to see her as loyal and faithful, but mostly ends up using her for sex. Eventually, Laura demands more commitment and calls off their arrangement when he refuses. She later confided to Ian's next-door neighbour Garry Hobbs (Ricky Groves) about this and they kiss; Ian is furious when he finds out and threatens to sack Laura. She later resigns and plans to leave Ian, but changes her mind upon learning that Ian is declared bankrupt due to his monetary troubles; she decides to stay for the sake of Ian's children and they become a couple. Laura tries to raise money to buy the fish and chip shop so they can run it together, secretly borrowing money from Ian's former wife Mel Healy (Tamzin Outhwaite). Eventually, Ian proposes marriage to Laura; she accepts despite facing opposition from her wealthy father, who distrusts Ian because of his narcissism and bankruptcy. In 2001, Ian and Laura get married. She later discovers that Ian has found out about an inheritance she received and wonders if Ian only wants her money. Ian convinces her this is not true.

Laura is jealous when Ian goes into business with Mel. She catches them kissing and moves out, but Ian wins her round again. When Mel is arrested for money laundering and drug dealing, having been falsely implicated by her late husband Steve Owen (Martin Kemp) for his criminal activities, she signs her business over to Laura – worried about them being seized by the authorities. Laura refuses to give them back and Mel is left being remanded in custody, until she is later released on bail; Mel later departs the Square after informing Ian of Laura's spiteful deed, as well as telling Laura that she was Ian's first choice. Laura delights in belittling Ian and decides she wants a baby. Ian refuses and Laura is heartbroken when she discovers Ian has been paying fellow resident Janine Butcher (Charlie Brooks) to sleep with him. Janine goes to Laura's house because she feels guilty; they argue and Laura throws a pan of boiling milk at Janine, putting her in hospital and sparking a feud between them. Laura reconciles with Ian on the promise that they will have a baby, but he has a secret vasectomy. Laura gets pregnant and, believing that he cannot be the father, Ian cons her into signing her share of the businesses over to him and throws her out. Laura tells Garry he is the father, following a drunken night together. Garry's wife Lynne Hobbs (Elaine Lordan) throws him out so they move into a bedsit together. Laura soon gives birth to a baby, whom she names Bobby (Kevin Curran), but he needs a blood transfusion and Laura learns that Garry is not Bobby's father; however, given Ian's lack of interest and wanting her son to have a father, Laura doesn't tell Garry about this. Ian's estranged stepfather Phil Mitchell (Steve McFadden) later appoints Laura as the manager of the café Ian used to own and she names it "Laura's", but Phil's sister, Sam (Kim Medcalf), sells the café to Ian and he sacks Laura.

Laura's conflict with Janine continues after an argument outside the Queen Vic. Laura flies into a rage at Janine, but gets overpowered in the end. Janine later stops Laura from getting a job by badmouthing her and in his response, Laura ruins Janine's business venture, this leads to Janine confronting Laura in her home. The argument escalates into a fight, which ends with Janine overpowering Laura and vowing revenge on her before leaving. An emotional Laura then decides to tell Ian he is Bobby's father but he shuns her. She writes him a letter but moments later, Ian visits her flat as he feels guilty. In her haste to answer the door, she runs down the stairs and trips on a toy, breaking her neck as she falls. She is found dead by Janine's estranged stepmother Pat Evans (Pam St Clement). The day after Laura's death sees Janine being charged with murdering Laura, but she is cleared when Pat is eventually persuaded to give Janine an alibi. She also finds Laura's letter to Ian and blood tests confirm Ian is Bobby's father. He feels guilty for the way he treated Laura before she died.

== Reception ==
Laura's departure was listed as one of EastEnders' best exits by Virgin Media. However, other critics described the character as a "loser" and "dreary", and that Ian and Laura were the "most miserable married couple in Albert Square".
