= Emma Barton =

English actress (born 1977)

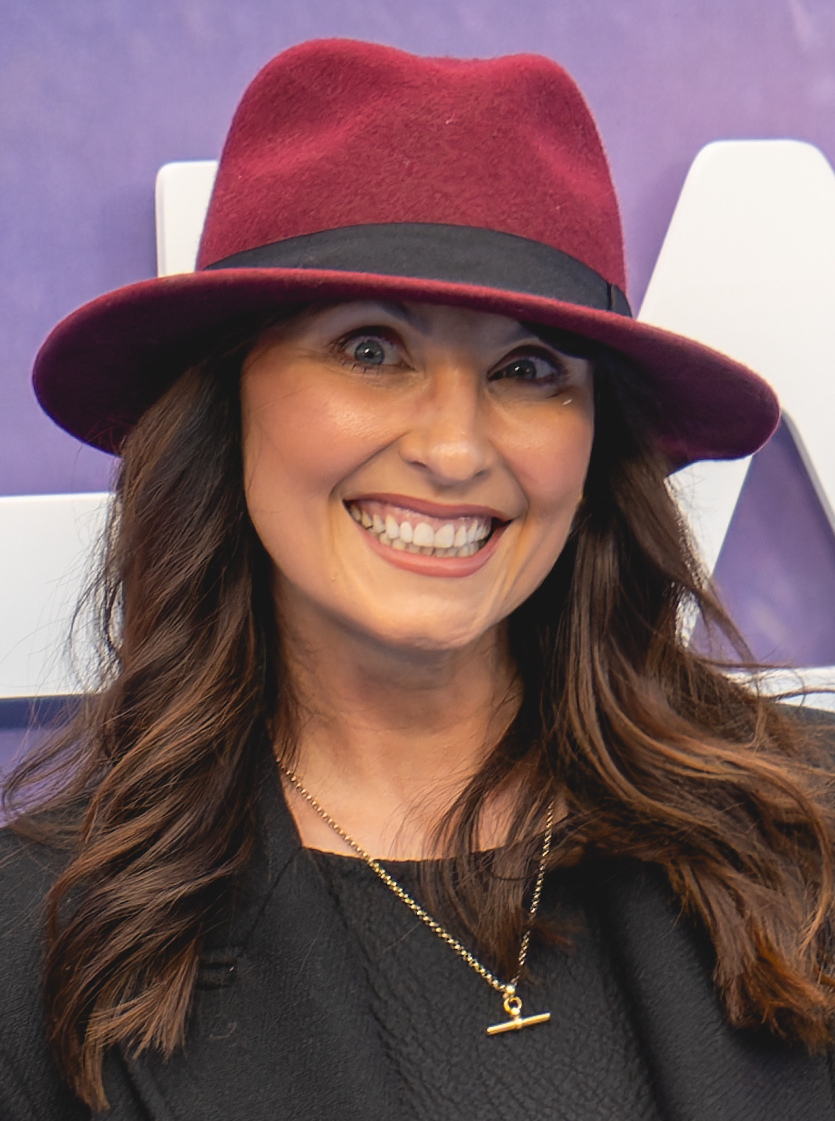
- Barton at the 2024 BFI London Film Festival premiere of That Christmas
- Born: Emma Louise Barton; 26 July 1977 (age 49); Waterlooville, Hampshire, England
- Education: Guildford School of Acting
- Occupation: Actress
- Years active: 2001–present
- Spouse: Nigel Stoat (m. 2002; div. 2005)

Emma Louise Barton (born 26 July 1977) is an English actress. She is known for her role as Honey Mitchell in the BBC soap opera EastEnders, which she has portrayed since November 2005. Before her role in EastEnders, Barton appeared in Spooks and stage productions including Grease and Chicago. In 2019, Barton competed in the seventeenth series of Strictly Come Dancing, paired with professional Anton Du Beke, reaching the final.

== Early life ==
Barton attended Horndean Community School in Hampshire from 1989 to 1993, and then trained at the Guildford School of Acting, graduating in 1998.

== Career ==
Barton joined the cast of EastEnders as Honey Mitchell in November 2005 and played the role until September 2008 when the character was one of several written out by executive producer Diederick Santer that year. Following a brief return in 2014, it was announced on 6 September 2015 that Barton would return to the role permanently in November that year.

On 14 November 2008, Barton sang live for Children in Need in the BBC studios in London. She starred in the title role of Snow White in the Marlowe Theatre's Canterbury pantomime from December 2008 – January 2009 alongside Stephen Mulhern. From March to November 2009 she was touring the UK in the stage production of Chicago, alongside Jimmy Osmond and Twinnie-Lee Moore, playing Roxie Hart.

In December 2009, Barton played the part of Jack in Jack and the Beanstalk at Devonshire Park Theatre in Eastbourne. In May 2014, Barton became an Ambassador for Locksheath Pumas Rugby Club in Fareham, Hampshire. Also in May 2014, Barton reprised her role as Honey in EastEnders for a short stint. In June 2014 she was a contestant in Celebrity Masterchef.

From 2011 to 2012, Barton played the part of Lily St. Regis in the musical comedy Annie at the West Yorkshire Playhouse. During 2014, Barton played Dolly in the National Theatre's touring production of One Man, Two Guvnors. During the 2016 to 2017 Christmas pantomime season, Barton played the role of Tinkerbell in the Crawley Hawth Theatre pantomime production of Peter Pan. She returned to pantomimes in 2022, portraying Fairy Bon Bon in Beauty and the Beast.

=== Strictly Come Dancing ===
In 2019, Barton competed in the seventeenth series of Strictly Come Dancing, paired with professional Anton Du Beke, reaching the grand final.

Week #	Dance/Song	Judges' score				Total	Result
Week #	Dance/Song	Horwood	Mabuse	Ballas	Tonioli	Total	Result
1	Jive / "Honey, Honey"	6	6	5	6	23	No elimination
2	Foxtrot / "Sunshine of Your Love"	6	6	6	6	24	Safe
3	Salsa / "Soul Bossa Nova"	6	7	7	7	27	Safe
4	Viennese Waltz / "Send In the Clowns"	8	9	9	9	35	Safe
5	Paso Doble / "Nothing Breaks Like a Heart"	5	7	7	7 (Note: Score awarded by guest judge Alfonso Ribeiro)	26	Safe
6	Tango / "Toccata and Fugue in D Minor"	5	7	8	8	28	Safe
7	Rumba / "Woman in Love"	5	6	5	6	22	Safe
8	Jazz / "Right Now"	8	9	8	8	33	Safe
9	American Smooth / "Let's Face the Music and Dance"	8	9	10	10	37	Safe
10	Quickstep / "Sparkling Diamonds"	6	8	7	8	29	Safe
11	Charleston / "Thoroughly Modern Millie"	9	10	10	10	39	Safe
12	Cha-Cha-Cha / "Hold My Hand"; Waltz / "Gymnopédie No. 1	7; 8	8; 9	8; 9	8; 10	31; 36	Safe
13	Charleston / "Thoroughly Modern Millie"; Showdance / "Let Yourself Go"; Viennese Waltz / "Send In the Clowns"	9; 8; 9	10; 10; 10	10; 10; 10	10; 10; 10	39; 38; 39	Runner-up

== Personal life ==
From 2002 to 2005, Barton was married to lawyer Nigel Stoat.

In June 2009, Barton opened two BreastHealth UK clinics in the Birmingham area.

In January 2019, it was announced that she would be running the London Marathon with other EastEnders cast members for a Dementia campaign in honour of Barbara Windsor. On 21 April 2024, Barton ran the London Marathon for the second time whilst simultaneously filming for an EastEnders storyline.

== Awards and nominations ==
Year	Award	Category	Work	Result	Ref.
2023	Inside Soap Awards	Best Partnership (with Perry Fenwick)	EastEnders	Nominated	
2026	National Television Awards	Serial Drama Performance	EastEnders	Pending	
