= Hannah Waterman =

English actress

- Born: Hannah Elizabeth Waterman; 22 July 1975 (age 51); London, England
- Occupation: Actress
- Years active: 1997–present
- Spouses: Ricky Groves (m. 2006; div. 2014); Huw Higginson (m. 2022)
- Children: 1
- Parents: Dennis Waterman (father); Patricia Maynard (mother)

Hannah Elizabeth Waterman (born 22 July 1975) is an English actress. She is best known for her portrayal of Laura Beale in the BBC soap opera EastEnders (2000–2004). She is based in Sydney in Australia.

== Early life ==
Waterman was born on 22 July 1975 in London to actor Dennis Waterman and actress Patricia Maynard. She attended Norwich High School for Girls and Saint Felix School, Southwold and Putney High School. She is also a graduate of the University of Warwick.

== Career ==
=== EastEnders ===
Waterman joined the cast of BBC soap opera EastEnders as Laura Dunn in February 2000. Waterman previously appeared in the soap as an HIV patient in 1997. The character of Laura became the third wife of Ian Beale (Adam Woodyatt), but the marriage was not a happy one as the paternity of Laura's son Bobby was disputed. The character was killed off on 30 April 2004, after falling down the stairs in her flat after tripping over a toy when going to answer the door. Janine Evans (Charlie Brooks) was wrongly accused of murdering her after a receipt was found in Laura's flat following a bust-up. Waterman's mother Patricia Maynard played Laura's mother in EastEnders for a couple of episodes in 2001, and her one-time step mother Rula Lenska had also made a guest appearance in the series during Laura's run playing Frank Butcher's girlfriend in the Spain episodes in 2002.

=== Other work ===
Since her departure from EastEnders, Waterman has appeared in episodes of the BBC medical dramas Doctors and Holby City, The Bill and a recurring role in New Tricks, which also starred her father.

On stage she has appeared in The Vagina Monologues, Soap at The Stephen Joseph theatre and Tom, Dick and Harry and Calendar Girls in the West End.

On 7 January 2007, she won the second series of the BBC's Just the Two of Us game show singing with Marti Pellow.

She has been seen in an episode of the Afternoon Play series on BBC1, in an acclaimed run of Alan Ayckbourn's Round and Round the Garden at the Theatre Royal, Windsor and as a contestant on Sky One's Cirque de Celebrité.

In 2009, she released an exercise DVD called Hannah Waterman's Body Blitz.

On 22 December 2009, she appeared on Channel 4 in a Christmas special edition of Come Dine with Me alongside David Gest, Diarmuid Gavin and Sherrie Hewson.

In 2010, she toured alongside Brigit Forsyth in a production of Carrie's War playing the part of Auntie Lou.

In 2013, she toured in Lindsay Posner's production of Abigail's Party playing the lead role of Beverly Moss.

In 2024 Hannah appeared in two episodes of the Australian Soap Home and Away playing a Judge.

== Personal life ==
Waterman married fellow EastEnders actor Ricky Groves in 2006. They separated in 2010 and divorced in 2014. Waterman has been in a relationship with Huw Higginson since 2010. They have a son, born 2011.

She emigrated to Australia with Higginson in 2013.

== Filmography ==
Television

Year	Title	Role	Note
1997	EastEnders	Maria	1 episode
1997	Dangerfield	Maura Puller	Episode "Inappropriate Adults"
1998	Casualty	Maria	Episode "Honey Bunny"
1998	Supply & Demand	Waitress	Episode "Blood Ties: Part 2"
1998	Trial & Retribution	Nurse	Episode #2.1
1999	Big Bad World	Country Supermarket Check-Out Girl	Episode "Don't Shoot the Cows"
2000	Peak Practice	Mel	Episode "Family Values"
2000–2004	EastEnders	Laura Beale	346 episodes
2006	Doctors	Maria Thomas	Episode "Keys to the Heart"
2006	The Bill	Fern Parker	4 episodes
2006–2010	New Tricks	Emily Driscoll	7 episodes
2007	The Afternoon Play	Kate	Episode "Come Fly with Me"
2012	Holby City	Ruby Macintosh	Episode "Half a Person"
2012–2013	Doctors	DI Collier	8 episodes
2022	Bali 2002	Rosemary Miller	1 episode "Restoring The Balance"
2024	Home and Away	Magistrate	2 episodes

Film

Year	Title	Role	Note
1997	The Missing Postman	Girl in Cafe	
1998	Tess of the D'Urbervilles	Nancy	
2000	Trust	Legal Secretary	
2009	To Cancer and Beyond	Angela	Finn Atkins
2011	Patient 17	Sarah Benedict	
2024	Touch	Sarah	

Theatre

Year	Play
2005–2006	Tom, Dick and Harry
2009	Rattle of a Simple Man
2009–2010	Calendar Girls
2010	Carrie's War
2011	Survive!
	Killing Time
	The Vagina Monologues
