= Stuart Laing (actor) =

British actor

- Born: London
- Occupation: Actor
- Years active: 1993–present

Stuart Laing is a British actor.

== Career ==
=== TV and Film ===
Laing started his TV career with roles in Casualty, The Bill and Minder in 1993. In 1994, Laing played a lead role in the two part BBC drama, Blood and Peaches. That same year, he appeared in his first feature film, 3 Steps to Heaven for Channel 4. Additionally, in 1995 Laing played the role of Lena Headey's Italian boyfriend in Devil's Advocate.

In 1995, Laing played one of the leads in the TV drama Strike Force, a show about RAF tornado pilots.

In 1996, Laing played the part of another pilot in the World War II feature Gaston's War, opposite Olivia Williams playing the character Harry.

Other notable TV roles in the late 1990s include two 10-part series: Berkeley Square as the character Jack Wickham and the BBC drama, In a Land of Plenty, as the character Robert.

Laing also appeared in the late 1990s in two Simon Rumley feature films, Strong Language and The Truth Game. In 2001, Laing played one of the leads in the film South West 9. In 2002, he played the role of David in the film The Lawless Heart and the lead role in the 2002 film Butterfly Man. In 2003, Laing played Jack Hewitt in the four part BBC series Cambridge Spies.

TV roles followed in 2003–2005, playing an assassin in Spooks, a semi regular in Holby City, and the BBC series Burn It. Laing also played a guest role in the Ray Winstone drama Vincent, Poirot, the TV drama Every Time you Look at Me, Francis Tuesday and Keeley Hawes's boyfriend in the date rape drama Sex & Lies.

Also in 2005, Laing appeared in The Inspector Lynley Mysteries and played the lead role in the Channel 4 drama The Animator. Laing played the guest lead in a one hour live episode of The Bill, playing a war veteran who takes hostages.

In 2006, Laing became a regular on BBC's EastEnders, playing over 86 episodes as Rob Minter, caught in a love triangle between May and Dawn.

Other TV roles have included Trial & Retribution, Silent Witness, How TV Ruined Your Life, Emmerdale and in 2019, Laing played a traumatised father who kills his stepson in the ITV Studios drama Vera.

=== Theatre ===
In 1993, Laing made his professional theatre debut in Joe Orton's Loot at the Thorndike Theatre. This was followed by the play Salt Lake Psycho and Bad Company at the Bush Theatre. Laing then appeared in two plays at the Leicester Haymarket Theatre, Over Hear and Kiss of the Spiderwoman, playing the role of Molina.

In 1998, Laing performed six short plays at the Soho Theatre called Food for Thought. This was the first of several plays at the Soho Theatre, the most recent being Hundreds and Thousands in 2011.

In 1999, he played opposite Andrew Lincoln in Hushabye Mountain at Hampstead Theatre. Other theatre roles followed in Indian Country at Chapter Arts Centre, Streetcar Named Desire at Theatr Clwyd, Seasons Greetings at Liverpool Playhouse and another Alan Ayckbourn play Drowning on Dry Land at Salisbury Playhouse.

In the West End of London, in 2008 Laing performed in the three hander Blowing Whistles at Leicester Square Theatre, followed by the premier of a Neil LaBute trilogy of plays that went on tour in the UK.

In 2014, Laing played the title role in Macbeth at the Mercury Theatre, Colchester.

In 2015, on tour in the UK, Laing played the role of Ed Boone in the Royal National Theatre's Olivier and Tony Award winning production of The Curious Incident of the Dog in the Night-Time (play). Laing played the role again for five months at the Piccadilly Theatre in 2019, after having also performed the play in China and Australia.

Additionally in 2019, Laing performed in another production of Macbeth at Chichester Festival Theatre, this time playing Banquo to John Simm's Macbeth.

== Filmography ==
=== Films ===
Year	Title	Role	Notes
1994	3 Steps to Heaven	Sean	
1997	Gaston's War	Harry	
1998	Inbetween	Job	Short
2000	Strong Language	Mark	
2001	The Truth Game	Eddie	
2001	South West 9	Jake	
2001	The Lawless Heart	David	
2002	Butterfly Man	Adam	
2003	Stag	Luke	Short
2005	The Great Ecstasy of Robert Carmichael	Stuart Reeves	
2005	Compartment		Short
2005	Lie Stil	John Hare	
2008	Albert's Speech	Simon	Short
2010	Big Mouth	Dad	Short

=== Television ===
Year	Title	Role	Notes
1994	Minder	Parker	
1994	Blood and Peaches	Steve	2 part drama
1995	Devil's Advocate	Vincent	2 part drama
1995	Casualty	Johnny Morrissey	
1996	In Your Dreams	Ben	2 part drama
1996	Kavanagh QC	Mark Holland	
1996	Heartbeat	Jack Abbott	
1997	The Bill	James Rowleigh	Series 15, Episode 140
1998	Berkeley Square	Jack	5 episodes
2001	Bob Martin	Alex	
2001	In a Land of Plenty	Robert	5 episodes
2002	Cambridge Spies	Jack Hewitt	4 episodes
2003	Murphy's Law	Pete	
2003	Burn It	Mike	5 Episodes
2003	Agatha Christie's Poirot	Ted Horlick	Sad Cypress
2004	Every Time you Look at Me	Steve	
2004	Sex & Lies	Alex	
2004	Francis Tuesday	Sean	
2004	Spooks	Johnny	
2004	Holby City	Simon Parker	Semi regular
2005	The Inspector Lynley Mysteries	Daniel Gill	
2005	The Animator	Mondo	
2005	The Bill	Jeff Clarke	2 part & 1 hour live episode
2005	Vincent	Donnie	
2005	Wire in the Blood	DS Harry Winter	
2006–07	EastEnders	Rob Minter	86 episodes
2008	Trial & Retribution	Jamie Johnson	
2008	The Bill	Rory Walsh	
2011	How TV Ruined Your Life	Daniel Batarat-Parat	
2012	Doctors	Alex Redmond	
2014	Father Brown	Charlie Denham	
2015	Silent Witness	Martin Cross	
2016	Casualty	Gary	
2020	Vers	Rob Baylis	
2020	Emmerdale	George	

=== Theatre ===
Title	Role	Notes
loot	Dennis	Thorndike Theatre
Salt Lake Psycho	Gary O	The Man in the Moon Theatre
Bad Company	Ian Smith	Bush Theatre
Over Hear	Mike	Leicester Haymarket Theatre & UK Tour
Kiss of the Spiderwoman	Molina	Leicester Haymarket Theatre
Food for Thought	Various	Soho Theatre
Hushabye Mountain	Conor	Hampstead Theatre
The Games Room		Soho Theatre
Indian Country	Greg	Chapter Arts Centre
Streetcar Named Desire	Mitch	Theatr Clwyd
Seasons Greetings	Clive	Liverpool Playhouse
Drowning on Dry Land	Charlie	Salisbury Playhouse
Blowing Whistles	Nigel	Leicester Square Theatre
The Furies / Land of the Dead	Jimmy / Man	UK tour
Hundreds and Thoudands	Allan	Soho Theatre
The Dolls House	Krogstad	Belgrade Theatre
Love and Money	Paul / Father / Duncan	Royal Academy of Dramatic Art
Peckham the Soap Opera	Ed	Royal Court Theatre
Macbeth	Macbeth	Mercury Theatre, Colchester
The Curious Incident of the Dog in the Night-Time (play)	Ed	The National Theatre
Macbeth	Banquo	Chichester Festival Theatre
