= Stephen Lord =

British actor

- Born: 1 October 1971 (age 54); Salford, Lancashire, England
- Occupation: Actor
- Years active: 1992–present
- Spouse: Elaine Cassidy (m. 2007)
- Children: 2 (including Kíla)

Stephen Lord (born 1 October 1971) is an English actor, known for playing Jase Dyer in the BBC soap opera EastEnders from 2007 to 2008, and Dominic Meak in the Channel 4 comedy drama series, Shameless, between 2012 and 2013. In 2021, he was cast in the ITV soap opera Coronation Street.

== Career ==
The BBC defended the use of violent scenes in an edition of EastEnders. In the episode, Lord's character Jase Dyer was seen losing his life following a confrontation with a group of gangsters who stabbed him after brutally beating him up. Later, the character's dead body was seen by viewers in hospital scenes which featured Jase's son Jay Brown, played by Jamie Borthwick. Lord appeared in the BBC drama series Casualty in 2010–11 playing the abusive husband of nurse Kirsty Clements (played by Lucy Gaskell) in an ongoing storyline dealing with domestic violence. In 2021, Lord was cast in the ITV soap opera Coronation Street as Tez Wyatt.

Lord portrayed Danny Nolan in the film Strangeways Here We Come.

== Personal life ==
Lord was raised in Langworthy, Salford. He is married to the actress Elaine Cassidy and the couple have two children.

== Filmography ==
=== Film ===
Year	Title	Role	Notes
1993	Raining Stones	(unknown)	
1995	Judge Dredd	Zed Squatter #1	
1998	Fast Food	Flea	
2001	South West 9	Fazer	
2002	Al's Lads	Eddy	
2003	Octane	Carjacker	
2003	LD 50 Lethal Dose	Spook	
2004	The Tell-Tale Heart	Ed Poe	Short film
2005	Frozen	Diver Kenny	
2006	The Truth	Felix	
2007	Until Death	Jimmy Medina	
2007	It's Not the End of the World	–	Director
2008	The Shepherd: Border Patrol	Benjamin Meyers	Direct-to-DVD in U.S.
2008	Kill Kill Faster Faster	Jarvis	
2008	Reverb	Wurzel	
2010	Route Irish	Steve	
2010	Jackboots on Whitehall	Yorkshire Farmer (voice)	aka: Nazi Invasion: Team Europe
2011	Desperate Measures	Ross Hadley	
2011	Pickle	Jim	Short film
2014	Default	Kane	
2015	The Violators	Mikey	
2015	Legend	Fuller	
2018	Strangeways Here We Come	Danny Nolan	
2019	Mrs Lowry & Son	Mr. Stanhope	
2025	Our Tallulah	Dad	Short film. Also producer & director
TBA	Butterfly Stroke	Lori's Dad	Post-production

=== Television ===
Year	Title	Role	Notes
1992	Wilderness Edge	Luke	Episodes 1–6
1992	The Bill	Robert Parsons	Series 8; episode 73: "Radio Waves"
1993	Heartbeat	Paul Manston	Series 2; episode 4: "Bitter Harvest"
1993	Screen One	Alf	Series 5; episode 8: "The Bullion Boys"
1993–1994	Luv	Darwin Craven	Series 1 & 2; 18 episodes
1994–1997	Common As Muck	Jonno Fox	Series 1 & 2; 12 episodes
1996	Into the Fire	Danny	Mini-series; episodes 1–3
1996	Testament: The Bible in Animation	Son (voice)	Episode 8: "Daniel"
1996	Giving Tongue	Lionel Giddings	Television film
1998–1999	City Central	PC Steve Jackson	Series 1 & 2; 20 episodes
1998	The Hello Girls	Mike Simmons	(unknown episodes)
2003	Real Men	Alex Collins	2-part crime drama
2006	Sea of Souls	Angus Jenson	Series 3; episode 1: "Insiders"
2007–2008	EastEnders	Jase Dyer	95 episodes
2009	Dr. Hoo	Agent Smart	Television pilot. Also producer & director
2010–2011	Casualty	Warren Clements	Series 25; 11 episodes
2011	PhoneShop	Ray	Series 2; episode 3: "Sleepyman"
2012	Comedy Showcase	Peasey	Series 3; episode 6: "The Function Room"
2012–2013	Shameless	Dominic Meak	Series 9–11; 18 episodes
2013–2017	Once Upon a Time	Malcolm	3 episodes "Think Lovely Thoughts", "Going Home" & "The Black Fairy"
2014–2015	Penny Dreadful	Warren Roper	Seasons 1 & 2; 6 episodes
2016	Marcella	Stuart Callaghan	Series 1; episodes 4–7
2016	New Blood	Raymond Keane	Episodes 4 & 5: "Case 2: Parts 1 & 2"
2016	Frontier	Cedric Brown	Season 1; episodes 1 & 2: "A Kingdom Unto Itself" & "Little Brother War"
2017	Safe House	Luke Griffin	Series 2; episodes 1–4
2020	The South Westerlies	Teddy	Episodes 1–6
2021	Coronation Street	Tez Wyatt	6 episodes
2023	Domina	Slaver	Series 2; episode 1: "Conspiracy"
2024	Vera	Tony Meddon	Series 13; episode 1: "Fast Love"
2024	Sanctuary: A Witch's Tale	Ted Bolt	Season 1; episodes 1–7
2025	Cooper and Fry	Dominic Kirkham	Episode 2

=== Video games ===
Year	Title	Role	Notes
2022	Grid Legends	James Randall	
