= Diederick Santer =

British television producer (born 1969)

- Born: 3 July 1969 (age 56); Cambridge, England
- Occupations: TV producer Businessman
- Years active: 1996–present
- Television: EastEnders

Diederick Santer (born 3 July 1969) is a British television producer and is best known for his work on the popular BBC television soap opera EastEnders, a post which he assumed on 23 October 2006 and left on 1 March 2010. He was Chief Executive of production company Kudos from 2015 to 2019, and is currently Chief Creative Officer of BritBox International.

He is the son of the late Anglican Bishop Mark Santer.

== Early life ==
Santer graduated from the University of Leeds with a degree in Psychology and the History and Philosophy of Science. He attended Burlington Danes School in Hammersmith, where he played keyboards in Crazy Luke with Simon Stafford, whose band The Long Pigs made it into the UK Charts in the 1990s.

== Television career ==
His TV career began in 1996 as a freelance script reader for United Productions before becoming script editor on the first two series of Where the Heart Is, and assistant script editor on Paul Abbott's ITV series Touching Evil.

Santer moved to Granada Television where he script-edited the first two series of A&E and The Last Train before joining BBC Drama Series and Serials in 2000, where he produced the first three series of Debbie Horsfield's hairdressing drama Cutting It, starring Sarah Parish and Amanda Holden. He also produced The Taming of the Shrew, the Bafta-nominated Much Ado About Nothing for BBC One, and a lavish adaptation of Jane Eyre.

=== EastEnders ===
Santer became Executive Producer of EastEnders on 23 October 2006, his first episode airing on 5 January 2007, replacing Kate Harwood. He introduced several characters to the show, including ethnic minority and gay characters to make the show 'feel more 21st Century'. Characters he introduced include Zainab Masood, Shabnam Masood, Masood Ahmed, Tamwar Masood, Christian Clarke, Whitney Dean, Tiffany Dean, Ronnie Mitchell, Roxy Mitchell, Archie Mitchell, Danielle Jones, Jack Branning, Heather Trott, Lucas Johnson, Ryan Malloy and Syed Masood. He also reintroduced a number of previous characters to the programme, including Janine Butcher, Bianca Jackson, Steven Beale, Louise Mitchell and Sam Mitchell. He also axed a number of characters, such as Kevin Wicks, Deano Wicks, Carly Wicks, Mickey Miller, Keith Miller, Yolande Trueman, Garry Hobbs and Dawn Swann. He was also responsible for recasting the role of Bobby Beale.

Santer presided over numerous highly successful storylines during his time as executive producer, such as the aftermath of the demise of Pauline Fowler, the Christmas 2007 episode, which saw the reveal of Max Branning and Stacey Slater's affair, attracting 14 million viewers, and the "who killed Archie" storyline of Christmas 2009 was also widely acclaimed.

Following the show's 25th anniversary live episode, Santer stepped down on 1 March 2010 and Bryan Kirkwood took over.

=== After EastEnders ===
After stepping down from EastEnders, Santer continued to work at the BBC, executive producing in a special position developing "new shows that can be internationally co-produced". In May 2010, he left the BBC after ten years to set up his own production company called Lovely Day.

In 2014, Lovely Day's crime series Grantchester was ITV's highest-rated new drama series of the year.

In 2015, Santer become joint CEO of Kudos, with Lovely Day becoming absorbed into Kudos. In 2016, he became sole Chief Executive. Santer executive produces a number of the Kudos shows, including Grantchester, Flowers, and Tin Star.

In 2021, Santer joined BritBox as their first chief creative officer.
