= Ricky Groves =

English actor (born 1968)

- Born: Richard Groves; 23 April 1968 (age 58); London, England
- Occupation: Actor
- Years active: 2000–present
- Spouses: Hannah Waterman (m. 2006; div. 2014) Kay Russell (m. 2015)

Richard Groves (born 23 April 1968) is an English actor best known for playing Garry Hobbs in EastEnders from 2000 to 2009, before making a brief return in 2025. Before his role in EastEnders he appeared in the series Burnside, a spin-off from The Bill. He trained at The Poor School in London.

== Career ==
Groves joined the cast of the BBC soap opera EastEnders as Garry Hobbs, the boyfriend of Lynne Slater, a member of the newly introduced Slater family. He left the show in August 2009 alongside Dawn Swann. Groves took part in TV series Celebrity Coach Trip partnered with friend and co-star Alex Ferns.

In 2009, Groves took part in the seventh series of Strictly Come Dancing. In 2014, Groves took part in the second series of Splash on ITV.

== Personal life ==
Groves became engaged in 2005 to girlfriend and EastEnders co-star Hannah Waterman who played Laura Beale. The pair married in a ceremony on 2 September 2006, in a country church on Dartmoor. In January 2010, it was announced that Groves and Waterman, were to separate after 3½ years of marriage.

He is a supporter of Leyton Orient, Groves has also talked of his love of gardening shows on television, and partook in a gardening trivia quiz when he was interviewed by Tony Livesey on Five Live in October 2010.
