= List of Hollyoaks characters introduced in 2011 =

The following is a list of characters who first appeared or were due to appear in the British Channel 4 soap opera Hollyoaks during 2011, listed in order of their first appearance. In January 2011, it was announced that Gareth Philips would be taking over the role of series producer from Paul Marquess, who had been with the show for one year.

== Ruby Button ==
Ruby Button, played by Anna Shaffer, is the younger sister of Duncan Button (Dean Aspen). She made her first on-screen appearance on 3 January 2011. In December 2010, the Liverpool Echo announced that eighteen-year-old Shaffer would be joining the cast as Ruby. They said the character "will cause mayhem at the expense of her brother". Ruby has been described as "sneaky". Shaffer also announced her character during the Hollyoaks Christmas Music Show in 2010. In a poll run by Inside Soap to see which Hollyoaks character out of Ruby, Leanne Holiday (Jessica Forrest), Rae Wilson (Alice Barlow) and Theresa McQueen (Jorgie Porter) readers most wanted Silas Blissett (Jeff Rawle) to kill off next. Ruby came in second place with 21% of the vote.

== Esther Bloom ==
Esther Bloom, played by Jazmine Franks, made her first on-screen appearance on 18 January 2011. Esther is the granddaughter of Frankie Osborne (Helen Pearson). In January 2011, it was announced that Jazmine Franks would be joining the cast of Hollyoaks in a regular role. In June 2012, it was announced that Hollyoaks had entered a partnership with the fashion magazine Company for a storyline involving Esther and George Smith (Steven Roberts). The story arc sees them as new interns at the publications headquarters. The scenes are set in London and the editor, Victoria White cameos in their scenes. Esther and George face hardship in their attempts at independent living and she nearly ends her career by ruining a magazine feature. Paul Millar of Digital Spy also reported that Esther and George's friendship would also be "challenged in the special week" of episodes.

== JJ Osborne ==
JJ Osborne
- Hollyoaks character
- Portrayed by: Reuben (2011); Ryan Mulvey (2024–2025)
- Duration: 2011, 2024–2025
- First appearance: Episode 3000; 21 January 2011
- Last appearance: Episode 6514; 15 January 2025
- Introduced by: Paul Marquess (2011); Hannah Cheers and Angelo Abela (2024)
In-universe information
- Family: Osborne
- Father: Darren Osborne
- Mother: Suzanne Ashworth
- Stepmother: Nancy Osborne
- Sisters: Frankie Osborne
- Half-brothers: Rhys Ashworth; Josh Ashworth; Oscar Osborne; Charlie Dean (adoptive); Phoenix Hathaway (adoptive)
- Half-sisters: Hannah Ashworth
- Grandfathers: Jack Osborne
- Grandmothers: Sandy Roscoe
- Uncles: Joe Roscoe; Freddie Roscoe; Ziggy Roscoe; Robbie Roscoe; Jason Roscoe
- Aunts: Ruth Osborne; Bethany Cunningham; Nikki Fletcher
- First cousins: Jamie Fletcher; JJ Roscoe; Gabriel McQueen; Lexi Roscoe; Caleb Keane; Maddox Keane

Jack "JJ" Osborne, played by Ryan Mulvey, is the son of Suzanne Ashworth (Suzanne Hall) and Darren Osborne (Ashley Taylor Dawson). He was born on-screen on 21 January 2011, which coincided with the show's 3,000th episode celebrations.

In December 2010, it was announced that Suzanne Hall would be reprising her role of Suzanne. It was announced that Suzanne would return pregnant with Darren's twin babies and give birth in the show's 3,000th episode. Speaking of his reaction to the storyline, Dawson commented: "I was shocked in the same way, but it's just typical Darren! It's great. Suzanne's return has come at a time when things are going alright for Darren for the first time in his life – he's settled down a bit, he's realised that he's going to go for it with Nancy (Jessica Fox) and everything seems to be going well. But in true Darren style, there's been a big spanner in the works. It makes for a very funny time ahead." In March 2011, it was announced that Suzanne would be departing Hollyoaks, along with Jack and Francine.

In January 2011, Suzanne returns from Spain heavily pregnant and tells Darren that she is expecting his twin babies. Suzanne goes into labour inside Look Sharpe and gives birth to a boy and a girl. Suzanne and Darren name the twins Jack and Francine, after Darren's father Jack Osborne (Jimmy McKenna) and his wife Frankie Osborne (Helen Pearson). Darren's ex-girlfriend Cindy Longford (Stephanie Waring) learns of Jack and Francine and offers Suzanne £100,000 to leave with them. Suzanne then refuses the money. She later tells Cindy she will leave in return for £200,000, to which Cindy agrees and Suzanne returns to Spain with Jack and Francine. At Suzanne's son Rhys Ashworth's (Andrew Moss) funeral, when Darren asks how the twins are, Suzanne says they have started talking, and he should come over and see them but Nancy said they have Oscar to think about. In February 2014, Darren went to visit Suzanne and the twins. In January 2024, Jack (now known as JJ) and Francine (now known as Frankie) returned to Hollyoaks.

In November 2025, while serving his prison sentence, JJ was killed off-screen by an unknown assailant organised by Connor Sullivan and Fraser Black Sr.

== Frankie Osborne ==
Frankie Osborne
- Hollyoaks character
- Portrayed by: Lexi (2011); Isabelle Smith (2024–present)
- Duration: 2011, 2024–present
- First appearance: Episode 3000; 21 January 2011
- Introduced by: Paul Marquess (2011); Hannah Cheers and Angelo Abela (2024)
- Spin-off appearances: Hollyoaks Later (2025)
In-universe information
- Other names: Francine Osborne (birth name)
- Occupation: Student; Shop assistant
- Family: Osborne
- Father: Darren Osborne
- Mother: Suzanne Ashworth
- Stepmother: Nancy Osborne
- Brothers: JJ Osborne
- Half-brothers: Rhys Ashworth; Josh Ashworth; Oscar Osborne; Charlie Dean (adoptive); Phoenix Hathaway (adoptive)
- Half-sisters: Hannah Ashworth
- Grandfathers: Jack Osborne
- Grandmothers: Sandy Roscoe
- Uncles: Joe Roscoe; Freddie Roscoe; Ziggy Roscoe; Robbie Roscoe; Jason Roscoe
- Aunts: Ruth Osborne; Bethany Cunningham; Nikki Fletcher
- Nieces: Katy O'Connor; Phoebe McQueen (adoptive)
- First cousins: Jamie Fletcher; JJ Roscoe; Gabriel McQueen; Lexi Roscoe; Maddox Keane

Francine "Frankie" Osborne, portrayed by Isabelle Smith, is the daughter of Darren Osborne (Ashley Taylor Dawson) and Suzanne Ashworth (Suzanne Hall). Francine, along with her brother JJ Osborne (Reuben/Ryan Mulvey), are both born in the 3000th episode celebrations, originally broadcast on 21 January 2011. Suzanne, JJ and Frankie departed in episode 3039, originally broadcast on 17 March 2011. She was portrayed by a child actress named Lexi during her initial 2011 stint. On 10 November 2023, it was announced that Hall had reprised the role of Suzanne and that she would be returning along with the twins in January 2024. Isabelle Smith was cast in the role of Frankie for a "huge storyline". Of her casting, Smith stated: "I'm so excited to be joining the cast of Hollyoaks, it still hasn't sunk in! You should expect a lot of ups and downs with Frankie but all I'll say is, don't judge her too soon…" She returned in episode 6291, originally broadcast on 18 January 2024. Frankie shows hostility to Darren upon her return as she has felt abandoned by Darren for a majority of her life. In a scene from episode 6358, originally broadcast on 22 April 2024 revealed Frankie and JJ were rapidly aged by two years as Darren told Freddie Roscoe (Charlie Clapham) and Ste Hay (Kieron Richardson) that Frankie is 15.

In February 2024, during a scene with Frankie and her grandfather Jack Osborne (Jimmy McKenna), Frankie accuses Jack of groping her. It was then announced on 8 March 2024 that in "a first" for Hollyoaks, they would explore sibling sexual abuse between Frankie and JJ. Executive producer Hannah Cheers said:

"It's one of the most infrequently disclosed forms of sexual abuse, yet the statistics are startling, Hollyoaks is shining a light on this issue for the first time in a long-term soap storyline because we need to get this conversation started amongst our multi-generational audience. Our research, story, script and writing teams have devoted themselves to telling this story truthfully and passionately. Huge thanks goes to SARSAS for their unwavering support in helping us take this on. The performances delivered by our brilliant newcomers Isabelle Smith and Ryan Mulvey are breath-taking. I believe this story will make an impact for years to come and I am proud that Hollyoaks is still breaking new ground almost four decades on. That's what we're here for."

The storyline explores the dynamics of the twins within the family, with JJ often labelled the "golden boy" while Frankie is seen as the "problem child". How the parents choose to investigate Frankie's distressing behaviour will also be explored as she continues to struggle with the abuse she has experienced. Claire Bloor of SARSAS shared praise for Hollyoaks' approach in dealing with such challenging subject matter. "Continuing dramas such as Hollyoaks have the potential to reach huge audiences and create change in the national conversation," Bloor said. "This storyline is an opportunity to shine a light on the under-researched and under-discussed topic of sibling sexual abuse. We hope that it will raise awareness of both the prevalence of this issue and the devastating impact it can have on those impacted by it."

The storyline commenced after JJ suggested they should "play school discos" (a trauma trigger word for Frankie). Prior to this, Frankie had been drinking after Darren had let Jack move back in. The scenes confirming the sexual abuse proved controversial with viewers. As Frankie struggles, Suzanne promises to take her to get her nails done, but misses it to drink and flirt with Ethan Williams (Matthew James Bailey). When Frankie watches them leaving together, she tries to cheer Frankie up by asking her to dance like she did during "school discos", leading her to attack Suzanne and being interviewed by local police officer Zoe Anderson (Garcia Brown). Frankie also starts a friendship with Lucas Hay (Oscar Curtis) during this time as they are both self-harming. By this point in the storyline, Frankie is terrified by JJ, she writes so in a diary that JJ discovers and he immediately rips it up in a heated confrontation. JJ threatens to reveal the truth about her self-harm to obtain her silence on his abuse. When the truth emerges about the self harm, Frankie blames Darren reasoning that it was his neglect and abandonment that led her to self-harm. The story reached a climax in episode 6355, originally broadcast on 17 April 2024, where Frankie is raped by JJ. This was deemed the storylines "most upsetting turn". Scared of a future pregnancy, she asks Lucas to obtain the morning after pill. They initially fail, however Lucas later gives her the contraception after he finds her in the park. She didn't reveal anything to Lucas, but just admitted that her first time was not a positive one. Darren makes a disturbing discovery when he finds Frankie's emergency contraception; he confronts her to no avail as she just claims she can not be protected. The plot then seen Lucas accused of the rape by Darren.

Continuing his manipulation, JJ keeps entering her room at night, until he is caught by Nancy. In a desperate attempt to keep Nancy in her bedroom at night, she overdoses Morgan Osborne on Antihistamines to keep her sedated so she would not wake up to interrupt Nancy, however Morgan is discovered by Darren severely ill and choking on her vomit, an incident that was initially reported on 7 May 2024. Later, Nancy asks Frankie if she knows anything about the incident, to which JJ tells her it was Oscar Osborne (Noah Holdsworth). He later manipulates Frankie into thinking this is a way of her owing him, and she later applies to a dancing school in an escape plan to get away from her brother after a warm conversation with Charlie Dean (Charlie Behan). It was further reported on 23 May 2024 that JJ would discover her exit plan in a "new twist". Frankie is sexually assaulted once again by JJ in-school as he felt she should have learned a lesson for trying to leave him for London – she makes a desperate plea for him to stop abusing her. In an interview for Inside Soap, Smith wanted to give "a voice" to those affected by similar abuse. She felt privileged when they pulled [Frankie and JJ] into a meeting, adding it was an honour to be trusted to portray the storyline. Smith went on to say Frankie "is becoming more sure of herself" when she starts to defend herself against JJ. She added how protective Frankie is over her siblings, and that "leaning into JJ's narratives" helps her protect those around her. When speaking on who she may tell, Smith indicated Nancy and Frankie's relationship is stronger and Frankie "could tell her anything". She then added that a "big moment" in the storyline would test the characters' relationships. Smith teased a "stronger side" to Frankie emerging.

In 2025, Smith received a nomination in the "Soaps - Best Actor" category the Digital Spy Reader Awards.

== Noah Baxter ==
Noah Baxter
- Hollyoaks character
- Portrayed by: Law Thompson
- First appearance: Episode 3004; 25 January 2011
- Last appearance: 29 July 2011
- Introduced by: Paul Marquess
In-universe information
- Occupation: Personal Trainer (2011)

Noah Baxter, played by Law Thompson, made his first on-screen appearance on 25 January 2011. Noah is a personal trainer and begins working at Look Sharpe spa.

Riley Costello (Rob Norbury) introduces Noah to Doug Carter (PJ Brennan) and Lee Hunter (Alex Carter). Noah advertises for a flatmate which Doug and Lee both decide to apply for. Noah challenges them to run around naked in order to decide who should move into the flat. Lee completes the challenge, but Doug refuses and Noah invites Doug to move in with him because Noah felt that not completing the challenge was the more dignified thing to do. Noah finds employment at Tony Hutchinson's (Nick Pickard) spa Look Sharpe as a personal trainer. Whilst giving Doug a massage, Noah reveals he is homosexual. He meets Ste Hay (Kieron Richardson) and assumes that he is homosexual, but Ste lies and disagrees with him. Noah finds drugs in Doug's possession and tells him to get rid of them.

Noah becomes good friends with Cindy Longford (Stephanie Waring), she set him up with Ste. They begin a relationship, but he soon realises Ste has feelings for his ex-boyfriend, Brendan Brady (Emmett J. Scanlan). Noah forgives Ste for sleeping with Brendan. Noah is forced to train Brendan at Cinergy, Brendan manipulates Noah and fakes an attraction. Noah kisses Brendan and Ste walks in on them. They realise Brendan set them up and agree to continue with their relationship. Noah has a job offer in Newcastle upon Tyne. Ste agrees to move away with him and they agree to have farewell drinks with Brendan. Brendan pays Sean (Matt Kennedy) to come onto Noah, they kiss and Ste catches them. Ste ends their relationship and refuses to move away with him. Noah decides to leave alone.

Anthony D. Langford writing for popular LGBT culture website AfterElton, branded Noah as "funny, likable and appealing." He also praised the dynamic with Noah, Ethan, Doug and Riley, opining it makes him seem like "one of the guys". He also stated Noah is refreshing and a positive image because he is gay and black. They also laid praise to scenes in which Doug reacted positively to Noah's sexuality.

== Billy Alexander ==
Billy Alexander
- Hollyoaks character
- Portrayed by: Richard Graham
- First appearance: 9 February 2011
- Last appearance: 17 May 2011
- Introduced by: Paul Marquess
In-universe information
- Daughters: Mercedes McQueen; Jacqui McQueen; Theresa McQueen; Emily Alexander
- Grandsons: Bobby Costello; Gabriel McQueen
- Granddaughters: Kathleen-Angel McQueen; Myra-Pocahontas Savage-McQueen; Maria-Carmella McQueen; Maria-Gabriella Fox-McQueen

William "Billy" Alexander, played by Richard Graham, made his first on-screen appearance on 9 February 2011. Billy's arrival was announced by Inside Soap in January 2011. Billy was described as a potential love interest for Carmel Valentine (Gemma Merna), who is "mysterious" and has a secret that affects the McQueen family. In Billy's storyline, he is revealed to be the father of Carmel's older half-sisters, Mercedes Fisher (Jennifer Metcalfe) and Jacqui McQueen (Claire Cooper). Cooper said that she "loved" working with Graham on the storyline.

A father for Jacqui and Mercedes had been talked about by previous producers. In May 2010, Paul Marquess said that while he had not been discussed, he would not rule it out. He said the storyline could be "too obvious" and said it needed a "really big twist" to make it viable.

Billy is first seen at Kathleen McQueen's (Alison Burrows) fund-raising event, where Mercedes accuses him of touching her. Carmel apologises for Mercedes' behaviour and agrees to have lunch with Billy. When he visits Carmel, her mother Myra McQueen (Nicole Barber-Lane) slaps him and reveals that he is the father of her daughters Mercedes and Jacqui. He tells Mercedes and Jacqui that he needs a kidney transplant and that they are the only likely donors. When Mercedes and Jacqui refuse to be donors, Kathleen tells Billy that he is the father of her daughter Theresa McQueen (Jorgie Porter). Theresa offers to be a donor and Billy thanks her by giving her his mother's charm bracelet. Ethan Scott (Craig Vye) becomes suspicious of Billy when he sees him drinking alcohol with Kathleen. When Billy goes to the hospital for kidney dialysis, Ethan and Theresa follow him. They discover that he is lying and that it is his daughter Emily Alexander (Elizabeth Henstridge), who needs a kidney transplant. Theresa then discovers a text message on Kathleen's mobile phone, asking for £5,000 from Billy, and realises that she was involved.

Billy later arrives to support Jacqui through the trial of her rape by Gilly Roach (Anthony Quinlan). Jacqui takes up Billy's offer of time away at his home in Spain. Upon their return Billy, Emily and Jacqui have formed a family unit. Jacqui agrees to take a test to see if she is a kidney match for Emily. When the test comes back negative, Billy and Emily decide to leave for Spain as Jacqui is of no use to them.

== Pete Hamill ==
Pete Hamill
- Hollyoaks character
- Portrayed by: Peter Mitchell
- First appearance: 21 February 2011
- Last appearance: 1 September 2011
- Introduced by: Paul Marquess
In-universe information
- Occupation: Headmaster (2011)

Pete Hamill, played by Irish actor Peter Mitchell, is an old friend of Brendan Brady (Emmett J. Scanlan). He made his first on-screen appearance on 21 February 2011.

On 10 August 2010, the Derry Journal reported that former Cast Offs actor and wheelchair user Peter Mitchell, would be joining the cast of Hollyoaks after a meeting with Hollyoaks series producer Paul Marquess. Of his casting, Mitchell commented: "I thought getting a part in ‘Cast Offs’ was fantastic and then came a part in Doctors but this is really big. This is a long term acting job – they don't come much bigger than this and I'm really excited about it." However, the role he would be playing was not revealed. Mitchell has moved from Derry to Liverpool, where Hollyoaks is filmed, for the role. He began filming his scenes in November 2010. On 2 December 2010, it was announced that Mitchell would portray Pete, an old friend of established character Brendan Brady (Emmett J. Scanlan). Pete was described as having "a complicated history with the nightclub manager and turns up with a score to settle". Mitchell later told the Liverpool Echo that landing the role was "beyond his wildest dreams". Mitchell is Hollyoaks second ongoing wheelchair using actor, following the introduction of Kelly-Marie Stewart as Hayley Ramsey in 2009.

In October 2011, it was announced that Mitchell had finished filming with the serial. However, his final scenes had already aired the previous month.

Pete is first seen in Northern Ireland when Cheryl Brady (Bronagh Waugh), Lynsey Nolan (Karen Hassan) and Mercedes Fisher (Jennifer Metcalfe) see him on their visit, he reveals he is moving to Hollyoaks. On Pete's arrival in the village he starts working as the headmaster at Hollyoaks High. He hires Amy Barnes (Ashley Slanina-Davies) as a classroom assistant, he reveals to her that he used to be as bad as Brendan before he was paralysed. He warns Brendan that he is going to get revenge on him. He agrees to keep an eye on Ste Hay (Kieron Richardson) for Amy. He tells Warren Fox (Jamie Lomas) about Brendan's past. He makes all students aware he is not to be messed with through his no-nonsense schooling. Pete helps tutor pupil Ruby Button (Anna Shaffer) through her reading difficulties. Ruby becomes infatuated with Pete and eventually kisses him during one of her tutorials. Pete develops feelings for Amy, but she doesn't notice his attentions.

== Alex ==
Alex
- Hollyoaks character
- Portrayed by: Annie Cooper
- First appearance: 5 April 2011
- Last appearance: 8 April 2011
- Introduced by: Paul Marquess

Alex, played by Annie Cooper, is the love rival of Mercedes Fisher (Jennifer Metcalfe) who threatens her engagement to Riley Costello (Rob Norbury). She appeared between 5–8 April. In March 2011, it was announced that Annie Cooper would be joining the cast as Alex. Of her casting, Cooper commented: "I am delighted to be joining the glamorous cast of Hollyoaks as naughty minx Alex. She's really going to test Riley and Mercedes's relationship and it's exciting to see how it all turns out." Of the character, a Hollyoaks statement added: "Alex only has one thing on her mind, but which wannabe WAG will reign supreme and at what cost?" In a later interview with Channel Five's soap opera reporting website Holy Soap, Cooper said "It's a lot of fun and really fast-paced. There are so many hot guys and girls rolling around. The whole cast is hot! I watched Hollyoaks before I joined, it's a great show." Alex is described as a "wannabe WAG" and a "little bit of a naughty minx". She has also been described as "clever" and having "a good head on her shoulders".

Warren Fox (Jamie Lomas) hires Alex to set a "honey trap" on Riley. She follows him to a night club on a night out and introduces herself. She pursues him and gets him drunk, they kiss. Warren is later annoyed Alex did not take things further and forces her to try again. Whilst at a party, Alex takes advantage of Riley and flirts with him. Warren lures Mercedes to Chez Chez where she finds Alex and Riley kissing in a toilet. Delighted Warren pays Alex off, whilst Mitzeee (Rachel Shenton) tries to expose their scam.

== Dodger Savage ==
Mark "Dodger" Savage, is played by Danny Mac, first appeared on 7 April 2011, before making his final appearance on 20 January 2015.

== Will Savage ==
Will Savage
- Hollyoaks character
- Portrayed by: James Atherton
- Duration: 2011–2015
- First appearance: 7 April 2011
- Last appearance: 4 February 2015
- Introduced by: Paul Marquess (2011); Bryan Kirkwood (2014)
- Spin-off appearances: Hollyoaks Later (2011)
In-universe information
- Occupation: Student
- Father: Dirk Savage
- Mother: Anna Blake
- Stepmother: Cindy Cunningham
- Sisters: Liberty Savage
- Half-brothers: Dodger Savage
- Half-sisters: Sienna Blake
- Wife: Texas Longford (2013)
- Uncles: Dr. Charles S'avage
- Nieces: Nico Blake; Faith Hudson-Savage
- First cousins: Dennis Savage
- Other relatives: Tori Devine-Banks

Will Savage, played by James Atherton, is the brother of Liberty Savage (Abi Phillips). He made his first on-screen appearance on 7 April 2011. Along with Dodger Savage.

In March 2011, it was announced that the Savage family would be introduced to Hollyoaks. Newcomer James Atherton was cast in the role of Will Savage, the brother of Liberty and half-brother of Dodger Savage (Danny Mac) and the son of Dirk Savage (David Kennedy), having previously studied at the London Academy of Music and Dramatic Art. Of his casting, Atherton commented: "It all happened really quickly and I'd started filming before I had time to think. Everyone's just been so friendly and made it really easy to settle in. Will is awkward, shy and a hopeless romantic that hopefully the viewers will fall in love with." Of the family, a Hollyoaks spokesperson added: "The new family will take the village by storm and are set to rub all the McQueens up the wrong way. The Savage family get evicted from their home when Dirk can't keep up with the payments. Liberty is furious to come home and find her house all boarded up but big brother Dodger has a new house for them to live in! While the McQueens are away on holiday, Dodger moves his family into the empty house and declares squatters' rights! How will the McQueens react to their new housemates?" In a later interview with Reveal magazine, Atherton said "I was so excited. It's all happened so fast – I got offered the part on a Thursday, and was filming the following Tuesday. All the cast have been lovely and welcoming." Will is described as "geeky, shy and a hopeless romantic". He has also been described as the "polar opposite" of "ladies' man" Dodger. In April 2013, Kate White of Inside Soap questioned why Dodger and Will pursued Texas, because White felt Texas lacked personality, "Why on earth are Will and Dodger both so obsessed with Texas? The village fountain has more personality than her - and is only slightly less wet."

Lynsey Nolan (Karen Hassan) is killed in a "whodunit" storyline after Will is angered when she ruins a picture he is taking by stepping into the frame. A promotional image featuring Will confirmed him as a suspect in the mystery. He is later cleared of Lynsey's murder when it is revealed that Dr. Paul Browning (Joseph Thompson) strangled her while Walker (Neil Newbon) watched on. In 2012, Will develops and finally admits his feelings for Ash Kane (Holly Weston) to his sister Liberty but finds her kissing Ally Gorman (Dan O'Connor), who has just cheated on his girlfriend Amy Barnes (Ashley Slanina-Davies).

Will consoles Texas Longford (Bianca Hendrickse-Spendlove) over her relationship issues with his brother, Dodger, and they have sex, but later it was discover by his half-sister Sienna Blake (Anna Passey). Texas realises that Will knew about Sienna and has used her. Dodger asks Texas to marry him but she writes him a good-bye letter and leaves. She later returns for Dodger, but Will reveals their affair. She confronts Will who throws himself down some stairs and she believes she pushed him. Will is left paralysed and a guilty Texas becomes his carer. Will guilt trips Texas into starting a relationship with him. He begins to spy on her and make Dodger jealous. He convinces Texas to marry him. Texas discovers Will and Leanne Holiday (Jessica Forrest) kissing and she sleeps with Dodger. Knowing that she plans to leave him, Will pretends to have an aneurysm to make her stay. Dodger tries to convince Texas to leave with him, but she decides to marry Will. Texas discovers the truth about Will's deception and begs Dodger to run away with her. She is later pushed out of a window to her death. Dodger is charged with her murder after video footage emerges showing him looking shocked and distraught after leaving Texas'. It is later revealed via a flashback that Will can, in fact, walk and that he pushed Texas out the window after she told him that she was leaving him and that she always loved Dodger.

Will admits to his mother Anna Blake (Saskia Wickham) that he killed Texas and she takes the blame because she does not want Will to go to prison. Will and Ash start a relationship but when Will discovers Ash is visiting Anna for a work experience placement and hasn't told him, he contemplates killing her. Will visits his mother and tells her that his new girlfriend has been lying to him. Anna is unaware that it is Ash but is concerned that Will's new girlfriend might meet the same fate as Texas. Will lures Ash to a cliff edge and tries to pluck up the courage to push her off but changes his mind when Ash tells him the truth about visiting Anna. Will asks her to change her placement, which she does but not before coming clean to Anna about dating her son. She continues to keep contact with Anna in secret as a friend, behind Will's back. Anna makes Will dump Ash but when Ash threatens to go on the rebound a jealous Will decides he wants her back. Fearing Will will kill Ash, Anna tries to contact him and leaves a message on Ash's phone saying "he killed Texas and I think he's going to kill again". Will drugs Ash and steals her visitor's pass to gain entry to the hospital. There he drowns Anna in a bath of water, after discover that his mother loves her ex-husband and Dodger and Sienna more than Dirk and their kids, but is seen escaping from the murder scene by Patrick Blake (Jeremy Sheffield). Will makes sure he is home before Ash awakens so that he can use her as an alibi. Patrick recognises Will's trainers and confronts him but nobody believes Patrick's claims that Will can walk and that he killed Anna. Ash thinks that Patrick killed Anna and Texas and Will breaks into Patrick's flat to try and frame him but Patrick catches him red handed. Will then blackmails Patrick into keeping quiet and the police give out a verdict of accidental death because there is no evidence of murder or suicide.

Will becomes very controlling of Ash after there is mild flirting between her and Dodger, prompting Will to become very jealous. After some arguments, the two agree to get married. Leah Barnes (Ela-May Demircan) sees Will hiding Anna's locket in a vent in Ash's house and later tells Ash what she saw, confirming Ash's suspicion that Will can indeed walk. She confronts him about it and he reveals that it was he who killed Texas and Anna. She attempts to escape but Will pins her down and tries to strangle her; however, he stops after she says she loves him. Dodger walks in and sees the situation, and Ash runs to him revealing everything Will has done. Just then, an explosion in the flat below rips through the house, killing Ash. Dodger has a standoff with Will and disowns him, before being crushed by a pile of rubble. He asks Will to help him, as there is more rubble waiting to fall, but Will has no mercy on Dodger and the roof collapses on Dodger, apparently killing him. Will carries Ash from the building, and is seen walking by his dad, though he returns to his wheelchair, lying that it was "survival instinct" that let him walk.

Dodger is pulled from the rubble and is still alive. At the hospital he is still in a coma but the doctors confirm that he will make a full recovery. Will tries to suffocate Dodger with a pillow but is interrupted by Dirk walking into the room. Dodger wakes up but cannot remember what happened during the explosion, after which doctors tell them he suffered a bit of memory loss due to concussion, allowing him to live as Will no longer has to kill him. When Danny Lomax (Stephen Billington) gives his son Ste Hay (Kieron Richardson) a box of things his wife Sam Lomax (Lizzie Roper) recovered from the flats, Anna's locket is one of the items. After Doug Carter (PJ Brennan) and Leanne's funerals, Ste gives Martha Kane (Carli Norris) the locket and after talking with Ste's daughter Leah, she realizes the locket is Anna's. She voices her concerns to Dodger and Dennis Savage (Joe Tracini) and the three of them conclude Will must have killed Texas, Anna and maybe Ash, but Will overhears the entire conversation and comes up with a plan. He sends all of Dodger's loved ones a text from Dirk's phone.

Soon Will holds Patrick, Maxine Minniver (Nikki Sanderson), Dirk, Dennis and Martha hostage at the house he inherited from Anna. He can not get hold of Sienna, not realising she is already there with Tom Cunningham (Ellis Hollins), who she is kidnapping to keep her fake pregnancy story a secret. When Sienna hears a thud upstairs, she goes to investigate - only to find the hostages. She goes to find a weapon, but the noise she is making alerts Will, who goes to see what is going on. Sienna attempts to free the hostages, but Will returns and overpowers her, taking the gun she had found off her. Martha manages to untie her bonds and stands up, confronting Will. Will decides to let her go after realizing she means nothing to Dodger, however after she disappears from sight, a shot is heard, and Will reveals he shot her after she tried to run away. Unbeknownst to Will, she survived and manages to call the police. When Patrick manages to untie his bonds, he stands up and pretends he is going to kill Dodger so Will's plan will be useless, but after Will hears sirens, he flees through the house with Dodger in pursuit. They have a big confrontation on the roof about how Will killed Texas and Anna. Will falls off, clinging to the edge of the roof. Dodger tries to save him, but Will intentionally drags him off of the roof, and they both plummet to the ground. They both survive, but after Will unintentionally broke Dodger's fall by hitting the ground first, he is terrified to realise that he has lost feeling in both his legs again, for real this time. He is then loaded into an ambulance, before presumably being imprisoned for murder. A month after his arrest & the discover of the truth of Sienna's fake pregnancy, Dodger chosen to support her than their own half-brother.

Will is seen again, a year later, writing a letter to Dirk, from prison, asking Dirk to visit him. Dirk does visit Will in prison, but he says he wants nothing more to do with him. Will then goes to court for his trial of his crimes, but he fakes an illness and runs to the toilets where he causes a fire and escapes by knocking out a police guard and dressing up as a fireman. Will then kidnaps Maxine and Theresa and ties them up on the boat where Dodger lives. Will then calls Dodger and tells him that he can only save Maxine or Theresa but not both. Dodger gets distracted when he sees Sienna tied up by Will and Sienna tells Dodger that Will has the girls on the boat about to kill them both. Will sets the boat on fire, but Dodger saves Theresa and Maxine from the fire. Will also survives, but confronts Dodger at the hospital roof, only to be pushed off by Nico. Dodger takes the blame for Nico and goes on the run. Will is in a coma but is revealed to be awake after Dirk says that he wishes Will was dead. For revenge, Will injects Cindy Cunningham (Stephanie Waring) with morphine, causing her to be hospitalised. Will then angrily says that Dirk was never the father he wished for, but Dirk fails to admit he was a good father. Later that night, an unidentified person enters Will's room and injects him with potassium chloride through his IV drip. Dirk enters Will's room, to see him go into cardiac arrest, but does not alert the nurses, to which Will dies. Dirk later feels guilty about his death, thinking he caused it. Later in the year, Will's uncle Dr. Charles S'avage (Andrew Greenough) dies by the same killer soon after. In October 2015, Lindsey Roscoe (Sophie Austin) is revealed as Will and Dr. S'avage's killer.

== Dirk Savage ==
Dirk Savage
- Hollyoaks character
- Portrayed by: David Kennedy
- Duration: 2011–2018
- First appearance: 15 April 2011
- Last appearance: 25 July 2018
- Introduced by: Paul Marquess
In-universe information
- Occupation: School caretaker (2013–2018); Emporium owner (2014–2018)
- Brothers: Dr. Charles S'avage; Wayne Savage
- Wife: Anna Blake (until 2013); Cindy Cunningham (2015 (void), 2017–2018)
- Sons: Will Savage
- Daughters: Liberty Savage
- Adoptive sons: Dodger Savage; Hilton Cunningham
- Stepsons: Alfie Nightingale
- Stepdaughters: Sienna Blake; Holly Cunningham
- Granddaughters: Faith
- Nephews: Dennis Savage; Nick Savage

Dirk Savage, played by David Kennedy, is the father of Liberty (Abi Phillips/Jessamy Stoddart) and Will Savage (James Atherton) and adoptive father of Dodger Savage (Danny Mac). He made his first on-screen appearance on 15 April 2011. Dirk made a previously unannounced departure from the show on 25 July 2018 when the character was killed off after being electrocuted in a swimming pool by Milo Entwistle (Nathan Morris).

In March 2011, it was announced that Liberty's family would be introduced to Hollyoaks. Actor David Kennedy was cast in the role of Dirk Savage, the father of Liberty, Will and Dodger. Of the family, a Hollyoaks spokesperson added: "The new family will take the village by storm and are set to rub all the McQueens up the wrong way. The Savage family get evicted from their home when Dirk cannot keep up with the payments. Liberty is furious to come home and find her house all boarded up, but big brother Dodger has a new house for them to live in! While the McQueens are away on holiday, Dodger moves his family into the empty house and declares squatters' rights! How will the McQueens react to their new housemates?" Dirk is described as sharing "many traits with Dodger". He also "tries to charm show regular Myra McQueen (Nicole Barber-Lane)".

Dirk arrives with his family and squats in the McQueen household. He charms Myra into letting him move his campervan into their front garden. The pair have a casual fling, much to the annoyance of the rest of the McQueen household. He also asked her to marry him, but she says no she is not ready. Dirk later supports Liberty through her exam results, while more bad news for Dirk, as his son Will was in an accident. After the accident he thinks that Texas Longford (Bianca Hendrickse-Spendlove) was the one who caused the accident and left him paralysed, and found out that Anna Blake (Saskia Wickham) is still alive. Will began to hate him, after he thinks that he betrayed him for Dodger, but told him that he loved him and cared for him, despite him killing Anna and Texas. In 2015, Will dies, and he attends the funeral alongside his brother Dr. Charles S'avage (Andrew Greenough) and girlfriend Cindy Cunningham (Stephanie Waring). Liberty and his nephew Dennis Savage (Joe Tracini) cannot attend the funeral, along with his adoptive son Dodger and his twin sister Sienna Blake (Anna Passey) who had refused to attend.

Dirk also has more tragedy when Dr. S'avage dies seven months after the death of his son Will, killed by the Gloved Hand Killer. He was devastated, as he never the chance to forgive him after their argument. His storylines included getting mugged by Robbie Roscoe (Charlie Wernham), having a serious relationship with Cindy and being an adoptive Father to Hilton, whose real father is Dr. Paul Browning (Joseph Thompson). Dirk later discovers that Cindy was married to Mac Nightingale (David Easter) in secret, causing him to divorce her, and discovers she had a son with Mac. However, he forgives her after he discovers that it was her father Gordon Cunningham (Bernard Latham) who arranged the marriage with Mac. Dirk later supports Cindy when his stepson Alfie Nightingale (Richard Linnell) has cancer. Dirk later accepts Cindy's proposal and decides to get remarried again following her divorce with her husband Mac.

When his nephew Nick Savage (Ben-Ryan Davies) raped Ellie Nightingale (Sophie Porley), he did not believe it as he supports Nick the way he supported his nephew Dennis when he had lost his wife Leanne four years ago. Dirk and Milo Entwistle (Nathan Morris) began fighting on the night of Cindy's daughter, Holly Cunningham's (Amanda Clapham) disastrous wedding to Damon Kinsella (Jacob Roberts), when it was revealed Cindy and Damon had sex and that Milo had been blackmailing Cindy about it. Dirk died when Milo pushed him into a swimming pool and electrocuted him.

== Rebecca Massey ==
Rebecca Massey
- Hollyoaks character
- Portrayed by: Daisy Turner
- First appearance: 10 March 2011
- Last appearance: 27 December 2011
- Introduced by: Paul Marquess
In-universe information
- Other names: Jenny Houston

Rebecca Massey (also Jenny Houston) played by Daisy Turner makes her first on-screen appearance on 10 March 2011. Turner attended a casting audition and eventually secured the role. Turner's casting was publicised on 22 February 2011.

Rebecca arrives in Hollyoaks under the guise of Jenny Houston, supposed sister of deceased club owner Danny Houston. It was later reported that serial killer Silas Blissett (Jeff Rawle) lines Jenny up as his next victim. Jenny is short of cash and starts talking to a "rich old man" online, wanting to arrange a meeting, drug him and steal his wallet and cards. Jenny is oblivious to the fact that she is talking to Silas. Rawle branded the scenario as a "tantalising game of cat and mouse". Jenny thinks Silas is a millionaire who she can trick, and Silas thinks she will be a "soft" target for him. Rawle explained that the Hollyoaks team were keen to keep educating viewers about "stranger danger" on the internet. He stated that "it's an ongoing message we're trying to put out that the internet can be a dangerous place. Silas could be grooming up to 200 girls, waiting for just one to let down their guard." Jenny realises that Silas is not a "harmless pensioner" after she finds a rope, a knife and some gloves in his bag. Rawle opined that Jenny is a "very clever adversary" for Silas. Jenny is chased through the woods and realises that Silas has drugged her. Rawle said that "there was no way that she could get away with drugging Silas". He opined that Jenny would have to be "quite audacious" to outsmart someone who has been a killer for quite some time. Silas then murders Jenny. During Jenny's short story-arc her real name is revealed to be "Rebecca Massey". She is given links to an established character, Doug Carter (PJ Brennan), who is revealed to be her ex-boyfriend.

Digital Spy have described Jenny as "mysterious", while he Daily Star described her as a "troublesome blonde" and "nothing more than a scheming money grabber". Digital Spy included Doug finding Jenny again and her subsequent ordeal with Silas in their "Picture of the Day" feature. A writer from the Liverpool Echo said that "Jenny has made quite an impression since landing in Hollyoaks - she's certainly not one to be messed with."

Jenny arrives and kidnaps Rhys Ashworth (Andrew Moss). She demands money from Warren Fox (Jamie Lomas) pretending to be Danny Houston's (Darren Day) sister, under the orders of Brendan Brady (Emmett J. Scanlan). Doug recognises her and it is revealed they used to be in a relationship, they reconcile. Jenny then tries to scam money from Silas in order for her and Doug to run away together. Although, she is strangled to death by Silas after she tried to drug him during a picnic in the woods, Doug tries to call her but her body lies buried. She is found the following day by Texas Longford (Bianca Hendrickse-Spendlove) who goes to see Lynsey Nolan (Karen Hassan) claiming she thinks that the person who killed her sister is responsible. A number of months after her death, Doug tries to kill himself. He has heavenly visions of her, and has to choose whether to go back to life in the village, or go to heaven and stay with Jenny. The two confess their love for one another, but Doug ultimately chose to live because of the positive effect his presence in the village generated on its residents.

== Maddie Morrison ==
Maddie Morrison played by Scarlett Bowman, is an old school friend of Bart McQueen (Jonny Clarke). She made her first on-screen appearance on 21 June 2011, and departed on 15 November 2012 when she was killed off in the Enjoy the Ride storyline. Casting for Bowman was announced on 13 June. Maddie was initially billed as a "beautiful blonde". E4 describes her as wanting to become the sixth form "Queen Bee - and Maddie is determined to get that crown. Ruling with a seductive mixture of beauty, manipulation and wit, Maddie knows the power of gossip and skillfully uses it to get what she wants - not that you'd realise this, as she's so charming that you just want to be her friend (or boyfriend)! One person who is onto her, though, is BFF Tilly, who sees through Maddie's confident facade. Does this gossip girl have a vulnerable side? Reunited with first love Bart during the wild weekend in Abersoch, Maddie immediately found a rival in Sinead, which means that when she joins the new sixth form the sparks are sure to fly as they vie for social supremacy."

== Tilly Evans ==
Tilly Evans played by former Waterloo Road actress Lucy Dixon, is an old school friend of Bart McQueen (Jonny Clarke). She made her first screen appearance on 21 June 2011. Dixon announced her casting through social networking site Twitter on 30 May. On 3 June it was confirmed Dixon would play Tilly. Dixon said she wanted her character to be a positive role model saying "I hope that we're going to be good role models for people of that age. That they can relate to that character and think, 'If she's going through it and she's coping, then so can I'". A writer for E4 described Tilly as being "fiercely independent, only getting involved in the dramas of Hollyoaks 6th Form when it's something she believes in. Though she had holiday romance with Esther in Abersoch, Tilly likes to keep her options open and is unlikely to settle down any time soon - though she does like to dabble once in a while! Quite the clever clogs, always with something witty to say, she is one cool lady. Tilly, will you be our friend?" For her portrayal of Tilly, Dixon received a "Best Actress" nomination at the 2012 TV Choice Awards. At the 2013 National Television Awards Dixon was nominated in the category of "Serial Drama Performance".

== Martin "Jono" Johnson ==
Martin "Jono" Johnson
- Hollyoaks character
- Portrayed by: Dylan Llewellyn
- Duration: 2011–2012
- First appearance: 21 June 2011
- Last appearance: 16 November 2012
- Introduced by: Gareth Philips
- Spin-off appearances: Hollyoaks Later (2012)
In-universe information
- Occupation: Student; Waiter (2011–2012)

Martin "Jono" Johnson played by Dylan Llewellyn, is an old school friend of Bart McQueen (Jonny Clarke). He made his first on-screen appearance on 21 June 2011. Casting for Llewellyn was announced on 13 June. Jono made his final appearance on 16 November 2012 when the character was killed off in the Enjoy The Ride storyline.

E4 described him as "hapless" and added that "There is one main interest in Jono's life - girls! After failing to pull in Abersoch, he is now determined to change his luck at Hollyoaks 6th Form, but as he is quite a naive, sensitive little soul his romantic plans always seem to go awry! Bless". Sarah Ellis of Inside Soap said that Jono behaved like a bad boyfriend and that Ruby should have just ditched him. Laura Morgan of All About Soap said that Jono needed to tell his mates "where to stick it", "man up a little bit" and be with Ruby.

Jono meets up with Bart in Abersoch with his friends Maddie and Tilly. Jono reveals that he and Maddie will be joining the Hollyoaks Sixth Form College in September. Jono arrives in Hollyoaks alongside Maddie to attend Ruby Button's (Anna Shaffer) party. He then starts college and makes friends with Neil Cooper (Tosin Cole). Jono and Neil claim to know all about dating females to impress the rest of the students. Jono turns up at Ruby's birthday party because he feels guilty that non-of friends attended. He shares a kiss with Ruby, and they decide to go on a date. Maddie attempts to put Jono off Ruby, by teasing him about her age. She starts belittling her and embarrassing the pair. Jono becomes ashamed of Ruby and tries to keep their relationship a secret. The first time they have sex is cut short as Jono does not last long. This causes awkwardness between the two and they decide to sleep together again to correct it. Ruby begins to want their relationship to become official, but when Maddie orders Jono to reveal who he is dating, he lies about her identity to impress her. When Ruby claims that she is with Jono, he humiliates her in front of his friends who laugh at her. Ruby dumps Jono. They reconcile their relationship when Jono gains the courage to tell her how he feels in front of his friends.

Jono later decides to join the army. Ruby tells Jono she wants him to stay and that she feels like they could still have reunited. Jono realises he will have to leave her behind so proposes to her so she can come to the army with him to live in the married couple's quarters. They tell Jack (Jimmy McKenna) and Frankie Osborne (Helen Pearson) who tell them Ruby cannot marry as they will not allow it. They plan to elope to Gretna Green and get married. On the couple's joint stag and hen night, Maddie Morrison (Scarlett Bowman) is upset after arguing with her ex-boyfriend Callum Kane (Laurie Duncan). Jono tells Maddie that she is beautiful and that she can do better than Callum. Maddie attempts to kiss Jono who rejects her out of loyalty to Ruby. However, Maddie's bully victim Esther Bloom (Jazmine Franks) witnesses the kiss. Esther tells Frankie and Jack of Jono and Ruby's plans to elope. Bart becomes intoxicated and cannot drive so Jono ask Neil to be his best man instead. Maddie steals a van to drive them to Gretna Green. Bart and Esther try to stop the couple marrying so follow them, distracting Maddie while she drives so she does not see Leah Barnes (Ela-May Demircan) on the road. Maddie swerves to avoid Leah and drives in to the wedding venue of Ste Hay (Kieron Richardson) and Doug Carter (PJ Brennan), and Cindy Longford (Stephanie Waring) and Tony Hutchinson (Nick Pickard).

Jono helps to free some of the minibus passengers but is unable to save Neil. Maddie is also killed in the accident, leaving Jono feeling guilty, although his heroics earn him the approval of Jack and Frankie. Later, he sits under the stars with Ruby and she is devastated when he does not respond to her. She screams for Jack and Frankie, but Jono has already died in her arms. It is revealed that he sustained a blood clot from the crash and that nothing could have been done to help him.

== Father Francis ==
Father Francis
- Hollyoaks character
- Portrayed by: Richard Winsor
- First appearance: 4 July 2011
- Last appearance: 4 October 2011
- Introduced by: Gareth Philips
In-universe information
- Other names: Nathan Harker

Father Francis, played by Richard Winsor, made his first appearance in July and is seen in the village Spa where trainee nun Carmel Valentine (Gemma Merna) works.

Digital Spy said Carmel will be "attracted towards her new acquaintance's rugged looks and religious nature", but she realises that Father Francis has been sent to test her faith and decides to stay on the right path. However, as Father Francis settles in, viewers "will be left to wonder whether she will stay strong or succumb to her true feelings." Speaking of his new role, Winsor, who previously appeared in StreetDance 3D, said "I didn't know what to expect but I turned up on my first day to a very warm welcome. The entire cast and crew are so friendly and supportive. Father Francis is in safe hands!"

He introduces himself as a new priest looking for help raising funds for Orphans in Africa. Carmel and Francis become close and nearly kiss on a number of occasions. They do never follow through with it because of their faith. Carmel helps Francis raise money for the African orphanage by a charity dance class and a nude calendar which, Francis, agrees to become a part of. Carmel and Francis talk about leaving their chosen paths in order to be together, but Carmel comes to the conclusion that Francis was sent to test her faith and decides not to go with him. Following Carmel's decision, Francis kisses her boss Cindy Longford (Stephanie Waring) then tells Carmel he is leaving for Uganda. Carmel gives him the money they earned through fundraising with some extra from Cindy. Francis is later seen in an expensive suit boarding a flight to Las Vegas revealing he's not a priest but a conman.

Francis returns sometime later, intent on stealing more money from Cindy but still harboring feelings for Carmel. It is eventually discovered that Francis has a partner in crime who he contacts over the phone, but he later tells the partner that the deals off. Their identity has yet to be revealed. Francis and Carmel soon declare their love for each other, but after she witnesses a kiss between him and Cindy, she tells him she never wants to speak to him again. The following day, after going to Carmel to beg for forgiveness, Francis reveals to her that he is a conman and that his real name is Nathan Harker. Carmel goes to Cindy and Tony with this information, and Cindy devises a plan to have him arrested as he picks up the money from her. Carmel and Francis decide to run away together. However, Cindy calls the police, and he arrested and taken away.

== Declan Brady ==
Declan Brady
- Hollyoaks character
- Portrayed by: Jay Duffy
- Duration: 2011–2012
- First appearance: 2 August 2011
- Last appearance: 18 December 2012
- Introduced by: Gareth Philips
In-universe information
- Occupation: Student
- Father: Brendan Brady
- Mother: Eileen Brady
- Brothers: Padraig Brady
- Sisters: Niamh Brady
- Grandfathers: Seamus Brady
- Aunts: Cheryl Brady
- First cousins: Macca
- Other relatives: Florence Brady

Declan Brady, played by Jay Duffy, first appeared on 2 August 2011. Declan is the son of Brendan (Emmett J. Scanlan) and Eileen Brady (Rachel Doherty). Of his son's casting, Keith Duffy said "They were looking for an Irish guy in Hollyoaks. They rang Duffy up, he went to London, did an audition, did a screen test, they called him back and they gave him the job." Duffy said that he did not expect to secure the role because it was a real audition and he had not had much acting experience. He was initially signed to appear in a small number of episodes. He made his last appearance on 18 December 2012.

Duffy described Declan as "an ordinary lad form Dublin, a school kid". Declan is visiting his father for a couple of weeks; Duffy said the visit is "all about him getting to know his dad" because "he doesn't know his dad very well at all". Declan is happy to see his father, he has always wanted "to chill out with him" but it is "pretty awkward" because they know so little about each other. The visit is also about whether or not Brendan will inform his son about his sexuality. Duffy also revealed that he was happy to be working with Scanlan and loved "every minute" of his time filming.

After Duffy departed on-screen, Bronagh Waugh who plays Declan's aunt, Cheryl Brady said that she was keen for Duffy to reprise his role because he was popular with female viewers. It was later announced that Duffy would be returning to filming for another stint. Keith Duffy said that Hollyoaks were happy with his son's performance. They tried to convince Keith to let his son leave school and they would fund a private tutor in turn for making him a permanent cast member. However, Keith felt that Duffy was not ready to leave school and work full-time with adults. Keith did grant him permission to film during school holidays and revealed that Duffy was filming in Liverpool for ten days.

Declan arrives with his mother Eileen to stay with his father Brendan. They go on holiday to Blackpool together shortly after arriving. Declan walks in on Brendan beating up Ste. Ste reveals to Declan that he is gay. Brendan tells Declan that he is not a man unless he has a woman and kids. Declan returns to the flat unaware Silas Blissett (Jeff Rawle) is upstairs. He hears a noise so goes to investigate but before Silas can attack him, he is frightened so runs from the flat. Rae Wilson (Alice Barlow) tells Ste not to let Brendan control him; reminding him the abuse relationship that he had with Brendan, not realising that Declan was standing in the kitchen, listening to them arguing. Brendan admits his sexuality to Declan, and they leave on good terms as he returns to Ireland. On 9 January 2012, Declan returned to the village without his mother's permission. During his five-day stay, he showed signs of anger and was very irritated. He later told his father that he wanted the respect he gets from making people fear him. After a dramatic telling off from his father, he finally reveals the reason why he came back: someone made a homophobic comment about his father and reacted violently. In the middle of the night, he runs away. The next day, Brendan and Cheryl search everywhere but cannot find him. But, he later is returned by Ste. Brendan tells Declan that he needs to pack his things, because he is sending him back home. Declan later leaves the village that night without saying goodbye to his father.

On 8 August 2012, Declan breaks into Chez Chez for reasons unknown. Brendan later catches him, and brings him back home, where Declan reveals that he owes people money back in Ireland for drugs. Brendan offers to help him, but only if he stops getting involved with the people he owes money to. Declan returns when he is kidnapped by Walker (Neil Newbon) as part of his revenge scheme against Brendan. As Walker's brother overdosed from drugs given to him by Brendan, Walker plans to do the same to Declan. Brendan manages to locate them and rushes to save his son, but he is already unconscious when he arrives, leaving Brendan to wait for news as he is rushed to hospital.

== Neil Cooper ==
Neil Cooper
- Hollyoaks character
- Portrayed by: Tosin Cole
- Duration: 2011–2012
- First appearance: 5 September 2011
- Last appearance: 15 November 2012
- Introduced by: Gareth Philips
- Spin-off appearances: Hollyoaks Later (2012)
In-universe information
- Occupation: Student

Neil Cooper, played by Tosin Cole arrives as a new student at the sixth form college. Neil made his first appearance on 5 September 2011. He made his last appearance on 15 November 2012 when he was killed off in the Enjoy The Ride storyline. The character was announced on 25 August 2011 with actor Tosin Cole taking the role. Neil was introduced alongside two other new characters George Smith (Steven Roberts) and Callum Kane (Laurie Duncan). They joined the established characters Maddie Morrison (Scarlett Bowman), Tilly Evans (Lucy Dixon) and Jono (Dylan Llewellyn). Cole originally auditioned for the part of Jono but failed to secure the role. He was later invited back to audition for Neil and had to "do like five or six auditions".

Cole said Neil "pretends to be someone that he really isn't, he has no game". Cole told Agent2 Magazine that Neil tends to big himself up when he is with his friend, and he turns "it up a little just because [he is] around the lads". Cole added that Neil is "being a lad" and is trying to enjoy his youth while he is still young. Neil is best friends with Jono and he "wrongly believes" he is popular with females. Hollyoaks writer Niki Rooney described Neil as "hapless Neil" who is "determined to make it as the stud of the college, but can hardly utter a word in any girl's presence... Is it already time to put him out to pasture?"

"Ladies man, the next "Lewis Button", all-round player, Neil is all of these things and more...or so he would have us believe! Yes, Neil and the truth have a very complicated relationship and he has been known to tell a few porkies - not out of evil-doing, he just really really wants to fit in with the Sixth Form crew".

— E4.com on Neil.

On 26 July 2012 it was announced Neil would appear in Hollyoaks Later's fifth series in scenes with British rapper Lethal Bizzle. The scenes featuring Neil, Bart and Jono were shot on location in Amsterdam, with series producer Emma Smithwick commenting that these scenes tackle "light and shade in the same strand".

Neil arrives in Hollyoaks village and joins the sixth form college. He begins working for Tony Hutchinson (Nick Pickard), who offers him driving lessons. Neil prepares to take his driving test and the group rely on him to drive them to a gig once he has passed. Neil fails his driving test but lies that he has passed. While driving the group to the gig Neil crashes Bart McQueen's (Jonny Clarke) car, angering him. Neil begins sending Mitzeee (Rachel Shenton) gifts, leading her to believe she has a stalker. Neil eventually tells her he is her admirer but did not send her the majority of gifts. Neil accompanies Jono and Bart on holiday to Amsterdam and gets to meet Lethal Bizzle. Lacey Kane (Georgia Bourke) invites Neil to watch a film and she tells Ally Gorman (Daniel O'Connor) that Neil is coming on to her and he threatens Neil. Neil joins his friends on a journey in a stolen minibus for Jono and Ruby Button's (Anna Shaffer) wedding. The bus crashes and everyone presumes Neil is dead. Maddie is the last to escape from the wreckage and Neil awakes and begs her for help. Maddie leaves Neil to die as the bus explodes. The bus explodes and Maddie blames Esther for the crash but before she can continue the flaming minibus door slams into her killing her.

Of the character's exit, Anthony D. Langford from AfterElton commented "I wasn't surprised to see Neil get killed. The character was ill-defined, little used and had never really amounted to much on the show."

== George Smith ==
George Smith played by Steven Roberts, debuted on-screen on 5 September 2011. The character was introduced as one of six new sixth-form students who arrive to study in Hollyoaks. The character was announced on 25 August 2011 with actor Steven Roberts taking the role. George was introduced alongside two other new characters Neil Cooper (Tosin Cole) and Callum Kane (Laurie Duncan). Completing the set of new students were the three previously seen characters of Maddie Morrison (Scarlett Bowman), Tilly Evans (Lucy Dixon) and Jono (Dylan Llewellyn).

== Kelly Saunders ==
Kelly Saunders
- Hollyoaks character
- Portrayed by: Danielle Malone
- First appearance: 5 September 2011
- Last appearance: 10 November 2011
- Introduced by: Claire Fryer (Hollyoaks Later); Gareth Philips
- Spin-off appearances: Hollyoaks Later (2011)

Kelly Saunders, played by Danielle Malone, is first seen taking part in a fit camp. She made her on-screen debut during Hollyoaks Later during September 2011 and will first appear in the main series on 10 October 2011. She left the show on 10 November 2011.

It was confirmed that Malone would first appear in the fourth series of spin-off show Hollyoaks Later. E4.com describe Kelly as "just the girl you want to meet Fit Camp - fun, feisty, and not above sneaking off for a cheeky bar of chocolate." They also said that they liked the character. After Malone's final scenes aired, Hollyoaks' producer Emma Smithwick said there were no plans for her to return. However, Smithwick said that Malone worked well on-screen bringing a "really sparkly" and "great" energy, and would bring Kelly back if "story is right".

Kelly first appears when she meets Duncan Button (Dean Aspen) and Ricky Campbell (Ashley Margolis) at a fit camp. She makes friends with them, but Ricky takes a dislike to Kelly. While they are meant to be losing weight, Kelly and Ricky hide away and eat unhealthy food where they bond. Kelly later arrives in the village with Laurence Saywood and Louis Souyaye to spend time with Duncan. Kelly carries on visiting Duncan; however, he feels that she fancies Laurence and not him. Kelly and Duncan tell each other how they feel and start a relationship. They later sleep together for the first time and grow closer. Kelly gives Duncan a naked picture of herself which Ricky keeps asking to see and after refusing for several time Duncan shows him the picture just as Kelly walks in. After Ricky persuades Kelly to meet Duncan, they meet up the next day where Kelly says Duncan needs to get more life experience and needs to grow up but also said he has a good friend in Ricky they then split up for good and Kelly leaves.

== Callum Kane ==
Callum Kane, played by Laurie Duncan, made his first screen appearance on 6 September 2011. The character was introduced along with five new sixth form characters. Describing his character, Duncan said "I think, most of the time, Callum is the kind of character who just doesn't really want to be bothered by anything or anyone. He wants to do his own thing, get on with his own life, and he's very introverted." Shortly after Callum's arrival, Scarlett Bowman, who played Maddie Morrison, revealed that Maddie and Callum would begin a relationship. Callum was the first member of the Kane family to arrive on-screen. His older sister, Ash (Holly Weston), was introduced a couple of weeks later, while his alcoholic mother, Martha (Carli Norris), and younger sister, Lacey (Georgia Bourke) arrived the following year.

== Ash Kane ==
Ash Kane, played by Holly Weston, debuted on-screen on 26 September 2011. The character was introduced as one of five new students who arrive to study at Hollyoaks Community College. Ash was the last new student to be cast into the series. Weston said the audition and screen test was very "last minute". After her final screen test, Weston went on holiday and was informed that she had secured the role and was required to return to Liverpool to begin filming. Weston said she and the other new cast members were initially signed to a six-month contract, which was a "trial period". Entertainment website Digital Spy first announced the character of Ash on 5 September 2011. The Hollyoaks press office said that the collective are "possibly the coolest set of students ever to land in the Chester village." They "shake things up" and embark on a journey through "life's hardest lessons". Their first week on the programme has been touted the "most fun and cringe-worthy Freshers' weeks of all time".

== Barney Harper-McBride ==
Barney Harper-McBride
- Hollyoaks character
- Portrayed by: Tom Scurr
- Duration: 2011–2013
- First appearance: 28 September 2011
- Last appearance: 15 May 2013
- Introduced by: Gareth Philips
- Spin-off appearances: Hollyoaks: Chasing Rainbows
In-universe information
- Occupation: Student (2012–13); Cleaner (2012); Deli assistant (2012)
- Father: Angus McBride
- Mother: Judith Harper

Barney Harper-McBride, played by Tom Scurr, debuted on-screen on 26 September 2011. The character was introduced as one of five new students who arrive to study at Hollyoaks Community College. Barney was the fourth new student to be cast into the serial. Scurr said the audition process was "very quick" and "good fun". He then had a screen test in London, in front of a casting director named Rick. Four days later, Scurr received a call confirming that he had secured the role, he then travelled to Liverpool to begin filming. Scurr told the National Union of Students, that he could relate to real life freshers because he "was thrown in at the deep end" at Hollyoaks and just had to make friends and get on with the experience. Entertainment website Digital Spy first announced the character of Barney on 5 September 2011. The Hollyoaks press office said that the students are "possibly the coolest set" to ever feature in the serial because they "shake things up" and face "life's hardest lessons". Their fresher's week branded the "most fun and cringe-worthy" one ever.

He's not offensive, he's not out there going "oh, I have seventeen ponies at home", he's never showing off. In his old life he never really fitted in anywhere, he was always on the outskirts of circles, he never had anywhere to belong. Now he's here in Hollyoaks all of a sudden he's got people who want to involve him in things: drink, going to clubs etc.

— Tom Scurr on Barney.

Barney was initially described as an "aristocrat - who is well out of his comfort zone at Hollyoaks Community College". E4.com have described him as finding himself "slumming it" in Hollyoaks after swapping it for his usual life of luxury. They added he would "find student life a real eye-opener" and struggle to do his own washing. Barney's "expensive tastes and chivalrous ways" are said to help him when it comes to socialising with serial's female characters.

While Scurr said that Barney is the serial's "token posh boy" who enjoys teaching others about expensive wine. He also said that Barney is from a "completely different walk of life" compared to the other students. He had been enjoying "the finer things in life" but did not get the grades needed to get into "Oxbridge". Scurr sees his presence at HCC as a chance to teach Barney that life is not all "black tie and crumpets". He is a "rabbit in the headlights" when he first arrives but he "quickly bonds" with his fellow students and they decide to look after him. They often joke about Barney's "naivety" but they are open about it with him. Scurr said their relationship with Barney is "odd" but at the same time it is "very nice". Scurr said that he loved playing Barney because of his simplistic discoveries such as learning to use a tin opener. Over Barney is a "sweet guy" and Scurr hoped that viewers would warm to Barney's persona.

On 16 May 2013, it was revealed that Barney had departed the serial in scenes which were broadcast on 15 May 2013.

Barney arrives during Freshers Week at the HCC, where Leanne Holiday (Jessica Forrest) takes him to his student accommodation. There he meets his roommates Annalise Appleton (Tamaryn Payne), Will Savage (James Atherton), Rob Edwards (David Atkins) and Scott Sabeka (Calvin Denba). Barney teaches the other students about his posh wine, he goes out on a night out with the other students and gets drunk. The next morning he wakes up in bed with Jade (Caroline Read) and the rest of the boys are shocked that Barney is the one that managed to pull a female. He later attempts to learn how to use a washing machine and adjusts to life living as a student.

Barney takes his friends to spend New Year at his home. His parents are away on a skiing strip. When Barney overhears his friends criticising his lifestyle which causes an argument between them. Barney decides to loosen up and party with his friends, then his parent unexpectedly return him. His father Angus (Edward Peel) tells him that he would like him to leave HCC and attend a high-class university. Barney is reluctant, but his mother Judith (Caroline Langrishe) threatens to stop his allowance. When Judith scrutinises Ash for her dress sense and bemoans his choice of friends, Barney lashes out at his parents and defends his circle of friends. Barney decides to defy their wishes and return to HCC and they refuse to give him money and take away his inheritance. Barney begins to struggle without money. He accidentally leaves money in College Coffee and is mugged by Phoebe Jackson (Mandip Gill). With no money left, he takes a job cleaning the Student Halls. Barney goes to visit Scott where he is hiding from an old friend and eventually convinces him to make up with him. In Summer 2012 Barney, along with his flatmates, leave halls and become homeless. Barney and Rob move into Tony Hutchinson (Nick Pickard) and Cindy Longford's (Stephanie Waring) flat. Nana McQueen (Diane Langton) asks Barney to begin dating her granddaughter, Carmel Valentine (Gemma Merna), in exchange for money. He finishes his second year at university and returns to Scotland.

== Scott Sabeka ==
Scott Sabeka
- Hollyoaks character
- Portrayed by: Calvin Demba
- Duration: 2011–2012
- First appearance: 28 September 2011
- Last appearance: 2 August 2012
- Introduced by: Gareth Philips
- Spin-off appearances: Hollyoaks: A Little Film About Love; Hollyoaks: Chasing Rainbows
In-universe information
- Occupation: Student
- Grandmothers: Mags

Scott Sabeka, played by Calvin Demba, debuted on-screen on 26 September 2011. The character was introduced as one of five new students who arrive to study at Hollyoaks Community College. On 16 July 2012, Paul Miller from Digital Spy reported that Demba had announced his exit from Hollyoaks. Demba and a spokesperson from Channel 4 confirmed that he had filmed his final scenes on 13 July.

If there's one person who will take to the relaxed student lifestyle like a laidback duck to laidback water it's Scott. Never happier than when he's enjoying the footie and a pint down the pub with his mates (especially Barney, one of our fave Hollyoaks bromances), you won't find him indulging in any wild behaviour – that's just not his style!

— A reporter from E4 on Scott.

Demba told a reporter from Impact Magazine that Scott is "your average guy" who is not very wild and likes a pint of beer. Scott is "chilled out" and concentrates on his studies. Demba added that he does not conform to the student life and "he does what's necessary to get by". Demba hoped that his cockney accent and his "lovely smile" would brighten Scott up. He thought the way Scott was written gave the impression that Scott was dull. Demba said that this was why he was attempting to implement some of his own characteristics and Scott feed off the energy fellow student Rob Edwards (David Atkins) provides. Demba opined that Scott is not a big character in the series, but he "keeps everything functioning" in his circle of friends. Scott is "a bit of a sweetheart" and "likeable" because he is always ready to be extra helpful to his friends. However, Scott's attentions soon turn to Annalise Appleton (Tamaryn Payne) and he "goes the extra mile" to sort out Annalise and Rob's relationship. Demba said that it was obvious that Scott was attracted to Annalise.

The serial later started to explore Scott's background, and it is revealed that he has a problematic past. As Scott went home for the Easter holidays, his friend Barney Harper-McBride (Tom Scurr) decides to visit him. Demba told Alison Slade of TVTimes that Scott's grandmother gets off to a bad start with Barney, "she thinks he's going to nick her stash of cash, so she puts on a boxing glove and chins him". Scott refuses to leave the house, and his grandmother keeps on mentioning his friend named Mitchell. Demba said that because Scott is from the East End of London, "you can't be an angel among demons all the time". Scott fell victim to peer pressure and "did a few naughty things" such as stealing. He did a job that went wrong and Mitchell took the blame. Demba added that his character "ran off to uni" to lead a different life. Slade said of the character: "He's earned himself a reputation as the Mr Nice Guy of the halls, who, if he were any more laid back, would be horizontal." Entertainment website Digital Spy ran a poll to find out which student was the most popular with viewers. Scott came third with 14.1% of the vote.

Scott arrives at HCC and greets his hall share students Will Savage (James Atherton), Barney, Annalise and Rob. Scott starts helping Rob to plan his anniversary with Annalise. He makes some invitations for the party, which Rob pretends he made to impress Annalise. She realises that Scott has been helping Rob and the two bond. He tells Annalise that Rob does not treat her right. When Annalise faces more problems in her relationship, she nearly kisses Scott. Scott and Annalise's feeling for each other grow and he tells her that she needs to decide between himself and Rob. Annalise tells Rob that she does not want to be with him anymore, but decides that she would like to stay single. Scott decides to give Annalise some time, but she later sleeps with Joel Dexter (Andrew Still). When Scott attempts to discuss the situation with Annalise, she tells him it will have to wait.

Scott goes to spend a university break at home and Barney joins him. Scott's grandmother Mags (Barbara Young) tells Scott he should repair his broken friendship with Mitchell (Jack Bence). Scott tells Barney that Mitchell went to prison for committing a crime he was meant to help with. As a result, Mitchell does not want to speak to Scott. Mags convinces him to fight Mitchell in a boxing match and as a result they make friends. He returns home to find that Mags has died. At her funeral, Annalise arrives and tells Scott that she wants to be with him. They conduct their relationship in secret but Rob's friend, Wardy (Karl James Wilson) sees them kissing and records them. Wardy shows Rob who decides to accept that Annalise has moved on.

Scott continues to date Annalise and in the summer the group decide to look for new accommodation. Scott puts a deposit down for a house but does not realise the ad is false and all the students' money is lost to the frauds, which results in everyone getting angry at Scott. He finds cheap accommodation for himself and Annalise to live in for a few weeks but she admits she is not ready to live with him, so they decide to break up. He manages to pay back the rest of the students their deposit money. It is then revealed that Scott failed his first year of university and so he decides to leave and go travelling.

== Annalise Appleton ==
Annalise Appleton, played by Tamaryn Payne, debuted on-screen on 26 September 2011. The character was introduced as one of five new students who arrive to study at Hollyoaks Community College. Payne said her audition for the serial was the first time she attempted to get into television. She said the whole experience had been "amazing". Entertainment website Digital Spy first announced the character of Annalise on 5 September 2011. The Hollyoaks press office said that the students are "possibly the coolest set" to ever feature in the serial because they "shake things up" and face "life's hardest lessons". Their fresher's week branded the "most fun and cringe-worthy" one ever. Digital Spy's Daniel Kilkelly later announced Annalise would depart the serial on 18 February 2013.

== Rob Edwards ==
Rob Edwards
- Hollyoaks character
- Portrayed by: David Atkins
- Duration: 2011–2013
- First appearance: 28 September 2011
- Last appearance: 18 February 2013
- Introduced by: Gareth Philips
In-universe information
- Occupation: Student (2011–2013); Gym instructor (2011–2013)

Rob Edwards, played by David Atkins, debuted on-screen on 26 September 2011. The character was introduced as one of five new students who arrive to study at Hollyoaks Community College. Entertainment website Digital Spy first announced the character of Rob on 5 September 2011. A Hollyoaks spokesperson said that the students are "possibly the coolest set" to ever feature in the serial because they "shake things up" and face "life's hardest lessons". Their fresher's week branded the "most fun and cringe-worthy" one ever. Digital Spy's Daniel Kilkelly later announced Rob would depart the serial on 18 February 2013.

Rob was initially billed as a "sporty jock", while E4.com have described him as having three passions: his girlfriend Annalise Appleton (Tamaryn Payne), "sport and partying". Rob is "sociable", likes "the blokey camaraderie of team sports" and "drunken banter". Through his social activities, Rob has gained a large number of "drinking buddies" and gained a "party boy reputation", though Annalise does not approve. Rob sees university as a chance to carry on partying.

Atkins has said that Rob is "a bit of a jock" who loves going out with "the lads" to talk about rugby. Rob definitely wants to go "on a three-year bender" when he arrives at HCC. Rob's girlfriend, Annalise, often organises Rob's life. Atkins said that she is "quite controlling" and the only reason Rob is at university. Rob does have a sensitive side when it comes to Annalise because "as soon as he knows he's done wrong he tries to make up for it." Atkins said there is potential to see trouble between the couple because "it is like any relationship". Rob and Annalise are at university in a "coming-of-age" situation. While their relationship is "good", it becomes "quite restricting" for Rob. Atkins said they need to give each other more space, but living in the same halls "makes it difficult". Atkins opined that their relationship is a realistic portrayal of those in relationships while studying at university. He also added that the situations that Rob gets into should be easy to relate to by any first-year student. Atkins later gave advice to the National Union of Students; he said that Rob "immediately signed up for the rugby team and spent most of his time in the SU bar." Atkins added that Rob's technique is a great way for any student to be "involved with the University spirit".

In November 2011, it was announced that Rob would be involved in a storyline in which he is run over by Ethan Scott (Craig Vye), who is using his mobile phone while driving. The storyline was to highlight the danger of text messaging while driving, making light of the fact that doing so increases the risk of a car accident by "23 times". Hollyoaks partnered with the independent road safety charity Brake for the storyline, which helped launch "Road Safety Week". The charity's director, Julie Townsend, said that "too many young lives are lost and ruined through road crashes". They added that it was important for television programmes such as Hollyoaks to highlight "appalling consequences of crashes". On screen, the storyline plays out when Ethan is texting Theresa McQueen (Jorgie Porter) and Liberty Savage (Abi Phillips) while driving. Ethan is not keeping an eye on the road and Rob steps out and Ethan accidentally run him over. The serial remained secretive about whether or not Rob survives the accident.

Calvin Denba, who plays Scott Sabeka, told Impact Magazine's writer that his character becomes friends with Rob and feeds off his energy, although Scott and Annalise would form a bond behind Rob's back, creating a love triangle scenario between the characters. Annalise later ends their relationship and they both try to move on. While Annalise surrounds herself with her studies, Rob goes out drinking and chasing females. Rob attempts to seduce Theresa, the ex-girlfriend of Will Savage (James Atherton). The move causes trouble with Will, whom he has struck up a friendship with. Atherton told Alison Slade from TVTimes that tensions arise from how they both fare on the rugby team. He explained that Rob "has never really recovered" from his leg injury sustained as a result of being run over. Will continues to progress in the team, which sparks an "element of jealousy" from Rob, who feels as though Will has taken his place. Rob then flirts with Theresa; Atherton said that Rob breaks the "mates code" and "it all kicks off" leading to a scuffle. Rob then has sex with Will's sister Liberty, which causes more trouble. Will and Barney Harper-McBride (Tom Scurr) stage an intervention and tie Rob to a chair; Atherton added that is in order to "make him get in touch with his feelings, he admits how he really feels about Annalise, and realises that he's been an idiot."

Rob arrives at HCC with Annalise and meets his flatmates Barney, Will and Scott. Rob dares Ash Kane (Holly Weston) to trip off in front of the crowd in the SU Bar, which annoys Annalise. Rob and Will join the university rugby team and he repeatedly goes out drinking with his new friends. He forgets to keep his plans with Annalise and she tires of his partying. They argue and she forces him to sleep on the sofa; they later make up. Rob forgets about his second anniversary with Annalise, but Scott offers to help out with invitations. Rob later goes out to a rugby match instead of having a drink with Annalise and, after a talk with Scott, Annalise rings Rob to discuss their relationship. As he heads to meet her, he is accidentally run over by Ethan, who drives away after hitting him. Jacqui McQueen (Claire Cooper) then discovers him and thinks he's drunk until she discovers blood near his head. She then phones for an ambulance as Ethan and Theresa looks on. Ethan later hands himself in and Rob recovers.

Rob fails to make the rugby team due to his injuries having an effect on his performance. Annalise grows close to Scott and decides to end her relationship with Rob. He pretends to be okay about their break-up and starts going out more. He throws himself at girls and causes tension in the halls. When he sleeps with Liberty, Will becomes angry and the rest of the students stage an intervention to curb his behaviour. He later argues with Annalise when she sleeps with Joel Dexter (Andrew Still) because he thought they may get back together. Rob begins seeing Texas Longford (Bianca Hendrickse-Spendlove) but soon realises she is only trying to make Dodger Savage (Danny Mac) jealous. Rob later sleeps with Theresa despite her being in a relationship with Joel. He attacks Rob when he learns the truth. He starts a slight rivalry with Liam Gilmore (James Farrar), but they later become friends. Rob later goes into business with Cheryl Brady (Bronagh Waugh) by acting as a suitor. However, Rob sleeps with the clients and she is accused of soliciting prostitution. Cheryl finishes the business and Annalise returns, announcing that she is leaving for London. They have sex and they reconcile. Rob and Annalise leave the village for a new life together in London.

== Daytona Lights ==
Daytona Lights
- Hollyoaks character
- Portrayed by: As themselves
- Duration: 2011–2012
- First appearance: 10 October 2011 (Laurence Saywood & Louis Souyave); 20 October 2011 (Danny Lawrence, Sam Fordham & Matt Gill)
- Last appearance: 18 May 2012
- Created by: Tony Wood
- Introduced by: Gareth Philips

Daytona Lights are a real world five-piece indie band that are introduced to Hollyoaks, with all members playing partially fictional versions of themselves. The characters were billed as "cool characters who provide an authentic youth story and can rock out the SU Bar."

The band's arrival was announced in September 2011. The band consists of lead singer Danny Lawrence and fellow members Laurence Saywood, Louis Souyave, Matt Gill, Sam Fordham. Lawrence said his band's inclusion was a "great opportunity" for his band to promote their music out to a "mass audience" because "that's what every musician wants". He also said his bandmates were enjoying the lifestyle Hollyoaks had to offer. Three of the band's members met while studying at a drama school in Hackney. Prior to their involvement with the serial, Daytona Lights were signed to a Hubris Records, a small record label which is headed by Steve Levine. Levine wanted to find a platform to promote the band on. British actor Stephen Fry introduced Levine to the Audio Network, a music library which offers commercial television low price and license free music. At the same time one of Hollyoaks' producers, Tony Wood was using the music from the library as he wanted the serial to gain a more "cool and indie" image. When Wood visited the band, he and Levine decided to work on joint venture to include the band in Hollyoaks for a promotional push on both parts. Wood also wanted to bring a real band into the serial as opposed to a fictional one.

Wood said their inclusion shows another example of Hollyoaks having more layers than just storyline. As the serial features popular culture and has a specific target audience, Wood felt that Daytona Lights are characters that are "aspirational, fun and who they could relate to." The band will be "softly" introduced during October and a slow build in storylines will progress. The members will debut onscreen separately and eventually form a band, Levine explained that "the concept is as you would have in real life where you come across a real band." Daytona Lights will be seen rehearsing and perform sound checks, while the Hollyoaks students drink in the SU Bar. Over their duration, the band's music will be made available for download and some tracks given to viewers for free. Their story arc culminated during a "big" storyline airing during a New Year's Eve episode. While off-screen Daytona Lights planned to release their first studio album.

In March 2012, it was announced that Daytona Lights would return to the series. The band filmed scenes at the Blue Planet Aquarium in Cheshire. Rebecca Wade who works for the aquarium, told Laurie Stocks-Moore of the Ellesmere Port Pioneer that the band had filmed at a number of locations in the attraction, but said the storyline had to remain a secret. The regular characters of Dodger (Danny Mac), Liberty (Abi Phillips) and Dennis Savage (Joe Tracini) also took part in the scenes; which aired later in 2012.

Laurence and Louis arrive in the village with Kelly Saunders (Danielle Malone), while she meets up with Duncan Button (Dean Aspen). Duncan thinks that Kelly is attracted to Laurence and Louis, unaware they are trying to pair Kelly off with Duncan. Danny and Sam arrive as friends of Ash Kane (Holly Weston) and perform at the S.U. Bar, while Matt turns up working as a bouncer at the venue. Sam meets Michaela McQueen (Hollie-Jay Bowes) and they start dating. Louis and Laurence secure a spot singing in the SU Bar, after an argument Laurence refuses to join in. Leanne Holiday (Jessica Forrest) tries to sort out their differences and they perform as planned. When Louis snubs Leanne's advances, Michaela tries to set Leanne up with Danny so she can spend more time with Sam. He shows no interest in her so Michaela tries to set her up with Matt. She starts following Matt around thinking he likes her.

Michaela asks Sam, Danny, Louis and Laurence if they can form a band. However, they are not impressed with Michaela's vocals. They remove Michaela from the band which makes her dump Sam. They invite Matt to join as their drummer and Sam reconciles with Michaela. Laurence and Louis move in with Frankie Osborne (Helen Pearson) and Ruby Button (Anna Shaffer) plants stolen money on them. They forgive her when she tells Frankie the truth. Michaela tells Sam that a scout is going to visit the band's performance at the SU Bar. They nearly mess their performance up after a technical fault and think that the scout did not show. Michaela uploads video footage of the performance and sends it to the scout. Louis reveals that they have been offered a developmental contract in London. The band then leave to start a new life in London.

Michaela and Leanne go to Sheffield to film an online video of their tour. Leanne starts following Matt around again and he tells her to stop. Sam then tells Michaela that he is not interested in getting back with her. The gig is cancelled and Dennis finds them an alternative venue.

== Bobby Costello ==
Bobby Costello
- Hollyoaks character
- Portrayed by: Jakob Chialton (2011–2013); Jayden Fox (2018–2023); Zak Sutcliffe (2025)
- Duration: 2011–2013, 2018–2023, 2025
- First appearance: 2 November 2011
- Last appearance: 23 July 2025
- Introduced by: Gareth Philips (2011); Bryan Kirkwood (2018); Hannah Cheers (2025)
- Spin-off appearances: Hollyoaks Later (2012)
In-universe information
- Family: McQueen
- Father: Riley Costello
- Mother: Mercedes McQueen
- Adoptive father: Sylver McQueen
- Stepfather: Doctor Browning; Russ Owen
- Half-brothers: Phoenix Costello; Gabriel McQueen
- Half-sisters: Maria-Carmella McQueen; Maria-Gabriella Fox-McQueen; Cher Winters (adoptive)
- Grandfathers: Carl Costello; Billy Alexander
- Grandmothers: Heidi Costello; Myra McQueen
- Uncles: Seth Costello; Jason Costello; John Paul McQueen
- Aunts: Jem Costello; Jacqui McQueen; Theresa McQueen; Carmel McQueen; Michaela McQueen; Carmina McQueen
- First cousins: Max McQueen; Kathleen-Angel McQueen; Phoebe McQueen (adoptive); Matthew McQueen; Myra-Pocahontas Savage-McQueen
- Other relatives: Silas Blissett; Wendy Blissett; Mitzeee Minniver; Maxine Minniver; Minnie Minniver; Trish Minniver; Marlena McQueen; Bart McQueen; Cleo McQueen; Breda McQueen; Goldie McQueen; Prince McQueen; Hunter McQueen

Bobby Costello is the son of Riley Costello (Rob Norbury) and Mercedes McQueen (Jennifer Metcalfe), who made his first appearance on 2 November 2011, the episode in which he was born. At first Bobby's paternity was unknown because of Mercedes' relationship with Riley and her affair with Riley's father Carl Costello (Paul Opacic). Mercedes went into labour in the basement of The Dog because she was being held captive by Riley's serial killing grandfather Silas Blissett (Jeff Rawle), who wanted revenge on Mercedes for betraying Riley by having an affair with Carl. After Bobby was born, the DNA tests later proved that Riley is Bobby's father. In November 2012, after Riley was shot dead by Simon Walker (Neil Newbon) in an accidental struggle with Brendan Brady (Emmett J. Scanlan) and Mercedes was arrested for stabbing herself and framing Riley's girlfriend Mitzeee (Rachel Shenton), Bobby was taken from the McQueens to live in California with Carl and his family, hoping he would have a better life without Mercedes. Bobby is killed off in the episode that aired on 23 July 2025, when he is murdered by Jeremy Blake (Jeremy Sheffield).

Bobby returns in 2018, after Mercedes, who has spent the last year in America bonding with him, leaves him in the care of her cousin Cleo McQueen (Nadine Mulkerrin). Bobby is happy to be reunited with the McQueens, especially Mercedes’ mother Myra McQueen (Nicole Barber-Lane). Carl returns to take Bobby back, where it is revealed that Mitzeee and Mercedes agreed that Bobby should live away from Carl because he has developed alcoholism, so he starts his new life with Mercedes and the McQueens. Bobby develops a strong father-son relationship with Sylver McQueen (David Tag) after he starts dating Mercedes, with Sylver and Mercedes marrying in 2019, and Bobby became a stepbrother to Sylver's daughter Cher Winters (Bethannie Hare). In January 2021, when the McQueens are being blackmailed, Bobby is taken from the airport by Silas, who is out to get Mercedes. Mercedes arrives to save Bobby and is forced to choose whether Bobby goes with Silas or stays with the McQueens, this last choice however includes Silas killing Mercedes. Mercedes chooses for Bobby to stay with the McQueens but just when Silas is about to kill her, her sister Theresa McQueen (Jorgie Porter) knocks Silas out and saves Mercedes. Bobby later finds Silas and tries to do CPR and Silas wakes up. Mercedes arrives and Bobby tells her Silas has gone but left a message that she won the game and he will not be back. Bobby then asks Mercedes why she never told him about Silas, to which Mercedes answers it was to protect him .

On 26 January 2023, it was confirmed that Jayden Fox had filmed his final scenes as Bobby, with Bobby's final episode airing on 10 April 2023. On 5 May 2025, it was announced that Bobby would be returning to Hollyoaks with Waterloo Road actor Zak Sutcliffe taking over the role. after previously played Tommy Bradshaw In 2021 Daniel Kilkelly from Digital Spy revealed that he had begun filming at the show's Liverpool sets and had been filming with his on-screen mother, Jennifer Metcalfe. However, further details of the storyline have been kept "under wraps." Sutcliffe exclusively told Digital Spy: "I'm having a lot of fun with my time on Hollyoaks so far. It's exciting to get into something gritty and complex." A Hollyoaks source added: "Mercedes hasn't been able to see her son Bobby recently. Fans know that she's been undergoing treatment for bowel cancer and recently spent time in prison. There are emotional scenes ahead as Mercedes gets her chance to reunite with Bobby, but under what circumstances? All will be revealed…"

== Dennis Savage ==
Dennis Savage
- Hollyoaks character
- Portrayed by: Joe Tracini
- Duration: 2011–2014, 2018
- First appearance: 15 November 2011
- Last appearance: 20 August 2018
- Introduced by: Gareth Philips (2011) Bryan Kirkwood (2018)
- Spin-off appearances: Hollyoaks: Chasing Rainbows
In-universe information
- Occupation: Phone salesman (2011–2012); Property landlord (2013–); Emporium owner (2014)
- Father: Dr. Charles S'avage
- Mother: Julie Savage
- Stepmother: Mariam Andrews
- Wife: Leanne Holiday (2013)
- Uncles: Dirk Savage
- First cousins: Will Savage; Liberty Savage; Dodger Savage (adoptive); Nick Savage; Hilton Cunningham (adoptive)

Dennis Savage, played by Joe Tracini arrives on-screen on 15 November 2011. Tracini's casting was first publicised in July 2011, when his father, comedian Joe Pasquale, told the Cornish Guardian of his involvement. Entertainment website Digital Spy later confirmed the casting and revealed that Dennis is a new member of the already established Savage family. Tracini revealed via his X, (then known as Twitter) account that he began filming in August and also filmed a spot in the Hollyoaks opening titles. A spokesperson did not release any advance storyline information about Dennis, but stated that Tracini has "great comic timing" for the role.

Soap opera magazine Inside Soap later revealed Dennis' relation to the rest of the Savage family, as being a cousin of Liberty (Abi Phillips), Dodger (Danny Mac) and Will Savage (James Atherton). Dodger is not pleased to see his cousin and does not want him living in his caravan. Dodger convinces Texas Longford (Bianca Hendrickse-Spendlove) and Leanne Holiday (Jessica Forrest) to let Dennis move in with them. Digital Spy said Dennis arrives being "confident and full of beans" and said he looks likely to "cause a stir".

In January 2012, series producer Emma Smithwick told Inside Soap that Dennis would be leaving for a small period of time. Smithwick said that on his return, she see Dennis and his family "having a bigger place in Hollyoaks". She also revealed that she couldn't get enough of Tracini because of the "charisma and great comic timing" he brings to the role. Tracini told Inside Soap that Dennis temporary exit storyline begins when he receives an offer for a two-month work placement in India. As Dennis is "quite taken" with Leanne he decides to let her know in case she wants him to stay. Tracini said that Leanne has been "using" Dennis to make Matt jealous. Leanne is "forced to admit facts and Dennis doesn't take the revelation too well". Kate White from Inside Soap said that Dennis had "injected originality, laughs and much-needed kookiness back into the show". White said that she could not wait until Dennis was back on-screen making "his next move". For his portrayal of Dennis, Tracini earned a nomination for "Best Comedy Performance" at the 2012 British Soap Awards. Tracini was later nominated for "Funniest Male" at the 2012 Inside Soap Awards.

On 24 April 2014, it was announced that Tracini had quit the show. Dennis's departure aired on 21 November 2014.

Dennis arrives to stay with his family as his parents have kicked him out. He meets Leanne and is instantly attracted to her, however she does not show any interest in him. Dodger tells Dennis he cannot live with them and convinces Texas to let him move into her flat. Dennis is delighted to discover that Leanne also lives there. Dennis becomes disgruntled when Leanne show more interest in Matt Gill, but still comforts her when Matt tells Leanne to keep her distance. Dennis waits for Leanne to return home from her Christmas break. When she returns he gives her intimate lingerie. Leanne feels uncomfortable because he knows what size underwear she takes. Dennis refuses to believe that Leanne does not want him. Dennis receives a job offer in Mumbai, Dodger tries to convince him to take the job regardless of Leanne. Dennis chooses not to listen, Dodger convinces Leanne to tell Dennis she is not interested. Texas and Leanne throw Dennis a leaving party and he goes to Mumbai.

Upon his return, Dennis reveals that he could not go to Mumbai due to his fear of flying. He stayed in a bed and breakfast and lost his job, so Dodger hires him to work in the SU Bar. Dennis' old work friend Neesha (Kiran Landa) visits him and tells him that he is too good for bar work so he later resigns from his job. When Dennis goes on a date with Neesha, Leanne becomes jealous and warns Neesha of Dennis. Neesha tells Dennis that she thinks he still has feelings for Leanne and leaves. He later helps out when his family host a tent party. When Will gets into trouble for fooling customers into thinking famous bands would be playing, Dennis goes on a road trip and convinces Maverick Sabre to perform. Dennis later becomes jealous when Leanne agrees to stage a sham wedding with Doug Carter (PJ Brennan) to hide his sexuality from his family. Dennis helps out with the arrangements but tells Doug's boyfriend Ste Hay (Kieron Richardson) that he does not want it to go ahead. The wedding does not happen but Leanne is upset that she did not get a wedding. Dennis agrees to marry her, but the minister says it would not be legal. They exchange false vows and Leanne tells Dennis that she does not want a relationship with him again. Dennis and Blessing Chambers (Modupe Adeyeye) later move to Blackpool in November 2014.

In August 2018, it was announced that Tracini would reprise his role as Dennis. The character returned for Dirk's funeral. On 15 August 2018 on the day Dennis returns, Liberty asks him how Blessing is and he tells her they are not together anymore.

In June 2025, it is revealed that Dennis had been murdered by Jeremy Blake.

== Joel Dexter ==
Joel Dexter, played by Andrew Still from 2011 to 2013 and by Rory Douglas-Speed from 2016 onwards, debuted on-screen during the episode airing on 22 November 2011. He is the long-lost son of established character Warren Fox (Jamie Lomas).

== Jodie Wilde ==
Jodie Wilde
- Hollyoaks character
- Portrayed by: Montana Manning
- Duration: 2011–2012
- First appearance: 19 December 2011
- Last appearance: March 2012
- Introduced by: Gareth Philips
In-universe information
- Occupation: Beautician (2011–2012)

Jodie Wilde, played by Montana Manning, arrived on-screen during the episode airing on 19 December 2011. A spokesperson for the serial said that "Jodie is ambitious to a fault - she'll allow nothing to stand in the way of her dreams to be a dancer. Let's hope she's not setting herself up for a fall." In her early appearances she shared scenes with fellow characters Doug Carter (PJ Brennan) and Dodger Savage (Danny Mac).

Beautiful, hot-blooded Jodie knows how to turn all the boys heads. Confident and sexy Jodie has already managed to catch the attention of Doug and Dodger. Jodie is a straight-talking girl - and we're sure that while she's studying at HCC University she'll be causing a stir...

— E4 on Jodie.

Manning said that Jodie is "different" to most females because she can "switch on and off", which makes her popular with men as she sets their "hearts racing". Jodie has a keen interest in performing arts; she views love as a "fool's game" and prefers to conform to a "treat em' mean and keep em' keen" attitude. Manning said that Jodie's attitude is strong enough to cause conflict with other female characters. Dodger's attraction to Jodie puts her in the firing line of the serial's jealous females. Initially describing her future hopes for the "likeable" Jodie, Manning stated; "I hope she has some gritty storylines, I think there is a lot behind her confidence and flirty eyes that she keeps hidden." Manning, a former singer, said that she did not want to portray Jodie singing because she wanted to keep her acting and singing career separate. She added that she shares Jodie's "drive" because she too is " very ambitious".

A columnist for Soaplife commented on Jodie's promiscuity. They opined that "lucky" Jodie had "barely been in Hollyoaks for five minutes" before she managed to get Dodger's "kit off". When Jodie kisses Texas Longford (Bianca Hendrickse-Spendlove), they jested that they were not sure who was more surprised out of Texas and Dodger. While a columnist for All About Soap also judged "sexy" Jodie's early appearances. They said that Jodie had managed to get all of "the men in Hollyoaks in a spin" and that "the girls can't seem to resist her ample charm either". They said she has no class because she has sex in a caravan. Their conclusion on Jodie left them undecided as to whether Jodie is the type of character to "fancy anything with a pulse" or out to "stir up trouble between every couple in town".

In May 2012, Manning announced via her Twitter account that she had left the series. The actress thanked everyone who supported Jodie's storyline with Texas and described her time on the show as "fun". In August 2012, series producer Emma Smithwick told Digital Spy's Kilkelly that it was always planned that Jodie would depart the series because Texas and Dodger were "the main story". She explained that Jodie is a character who brought challenge to Dodger and Texas' lives and "turned the heads" of two people who thought that they were comfortable with who they were. But Jodie "ultimately reaffirmed what they both liked about each other". They used Jodie and a "detour" and Smithwick stressed that Jodie and Texas was never intended to be a lesbian storyline - rather about Jodie being pansexual and liking a person regardless of their gender.

Jodie arrives to meet her friend Texas, who introduces her to Doug. Jodie agrees to meet up with Doug again for a drink. Doug presumes they are on a date and when it becomes clear he is not over his ex-girlfriend, Jodie tells him she is not interested in him romantically. Jodie then sleeps with Dodger who is surprised at her willingness to have a one-night stand. Jodie also makes friends with Amy Barnes (Ashley Slanina-Davies) and Michaela McQueen (Hollie-Jay Bowes), who initially takes a disliking to Jodie. Jodie and Dodger begin to flirt again but she rebuffs Dodger's advances. Jodie and Dodger sleep together again and Jodie admits that it meant something to her. She tells Texas that she can do better than Dodger. When both Dodger and Doug compete for her affections, she arranges a night out with them and invites Texas. While both men wait, Texas tells Jodie that she should choose which one she wants, Jodie agrees and grabs Texas and kisses her, who reciprocates.

Jodie senses that Texas is awkward around her and tries to resolve the situation. Texas tells her that she is straight and does not appreciate Jodie using her to make Dodger jealous. Jodie tells Texas that she actually likes her. Jodie enlists Texas and Dodger to help on her dance assignment. When Texas turns out to be a bad dancer, she asks Theresa McQueen (Jorgie Porter) to take her place. Texas becomes jealous and gets drunk, Jodie helps her into bed and they lean in for a kiss. Waking up together the next morning, Jodie tells a relieved Texas that they did nothing sexual. Jodie helps Texas out on her photography course work and fails her own assignment. On a night out, Texas becomes jealous of Jodie, who is flirting with Theresa. Texas kisses Jodie, but the following day Texas will not talk about their encounter. Texas later decides to start a relationship with Jodie, but then becomes confused about Dodger once again and dumps Jodie, but they agree to remain friends.

== Other characters ==
Character	Date(s)	Actor	Circumstances
Tamara	3 January 2011	Harry Bradshaw	A transgender girl who meets Jasmine (Victoria Atkin) and Heidi Costello (Kim Tiddy) at a gender disorder clinic.
Michael Chadwick	3 January 2011	Alan French	A consultant who meets Jasmine Costello (Victoria Atkin) at a gender disorder clinic.
Earl	6 January 2011	Robin Askwith	Melody Longford's (Sandy Hendrickse) music agent. Earl speaks to Lee Hunter (Alex Carter) about his boy band Guy Candy.
Registrar	13 January 2011	Jennifer Hennessy	The registrar who holds the wedding of Lee Hunter (Alex Carter) and Leanne Holiday (Jessica Forrest).
Joey Benton	18 January 2011	Alex Hardy	A photographer who photographs Mitzeee (Rachel Shenton). He photographs Mitzeee naked and attempts to withhold them for his own use. When Brendan Brady (Emmett J. Scanlan) and Warren Fox (Jamie Lomas) attack Joey, he gives them the memory card withholding the photographs.
Doctor	16 January 2011	David Smith	A doctor who turns off baby Kathleen-Angel McQueen's medical ventilator in order to find out whether she can breathe alone.
Magistrate	17 January 2011	John Draycott	A magistrate who oversees Tom Cunningham's (Ellis Hollins) assault trial.
Policeman	18–21 February 2011	Simon Holland Roberts	A policeman who arrests Gilly Roach (Anthony Quinlan) for the alleged rape of Jacqui McQueen (Claire Cooper).
Policewoman	21 February 2011	Vicky Mills	A policewoman who arrests Gilly Roach (Anthony Quinlan) for the alleged rape of Jacqui McQueen (Claire Cooper).
Morag Fairhurst	14–17 March 2011	Lisa Coleman	Morag is the ex-wife of Rob O'Connor (Gary Cargill) and the mother of Sinead (Stephanie Davis) and Finn (Connor Wilkinson/Keith Rice). She meets Sinead and tells her that she was diagnosed with leukaemia when she was younger and in order to save her life, she gave birth to Finn. Morag explains that she never bonded with Finn, and after discovering Rob was having an affair with Diane (Alex Fletcher), she left the family. She then invites Sinead on a holiday to New York City, but she refuses as Morag has no desire to try to bond with Finn, and Sinead does not want to hurt Finn's feelings.
Emily Alexander	10 March-17 May 2011	Elizabeth Henstridge	Emily first appears in hospital with her father Billy Alexander (Richard Graham), where it is revealed that she needs a kidney transplant. She is later seen when half-sister Jacqui McQueen (Claire Cooper) agrees to be her donor. When Jacqui is not a match Emily reveals that she was only interested in Jacqui's kidney and not her as a person before leaving.
Court Clerk	28 March 2011	Reece Andrews	A court clerk at Gilly Roach's (Anthony Quinlan) rape trial.
John Wharmby	28–31 March 2011	Daniel Pirrie	John is Jacqui McQueen's (Claire Cooper) barrister at Gilly Roach's (Anthony Quinlan) rape trial. Natalie is Gilly's barrister and the Judge presides over the trial.
Natalie Talbot	28–31 March 2011	Polly Maberly	John is Jacqui McQueen's (Claire Cooper) barrister at Gilly Roach's (Anthony Quinlan) rape trial. Natalie is Gilly's barrister and the Judge presides over the trial.
Judge	28–31 March 2011	Judy Holt	John is Jacqui McQueen's (Claire Cooper) barrister at Gilly Roach's (Anthony Quinlan) rape trial. Natalie is Gilly's barrister and the Judge presides over the trial.
Lisa Alcroft	29 March 2011	Charlotte Gascoyne	In December 2010, Hollyoaks casting directors announced auditions for a character named Kelsey Alcroft.
Nurse Jennings	11 April 2011	Flo Wilson	Nurse Jennings interviews Lynsey Nolan (Karen Hassan) about her suspension following an incident in which she refused to help Silas Blissett (Jeff Rawle) when he was in need of urgent medical attention.
Kidnapper	15 April 2011	Colin Hogg	A man helping Jenny to kidnap Rhys Ashworth (Andrew Moss), when he creeps up behind Rhys and throws him into the back of a van.
D.I Small	27 April–31 August 2012	Victoria Pritchard	Detective Inspector Small is the lead investigator in the serial killer case working alongside Ethan Scott (Craig Vye). She arrives when the second victim Rebecca Massey (Daisy Turner) is murdered by killer Silas Blissett (Jeff Rawle), she later arrests Brendan Brady (Emmett J. Scanlan) on suspicion but is forced to release him when he is supplied with an alibi. She later returns when Rae Wilson (Alice Barlow) is murdered once again arresting Brendan after he is set up by Silas and makes him out to be the killer. Small charges Brendan for Rae's murder after Silas continues to plant evidence on Brendan. When Heidi Costello (Kim Tiddy) is murdered she arrests Silas and asks Lynsey Nolan (Karen Hassan) for help when Silas will speak only to her. She returns in 2012 to investigate the murder of Lynsey in which she believes could be linked to Silas.
Rocco	2–5 May 2011	Arinze Kene	In April 2011 it was announced that former EastEnders star Arinze Kene was to play the guest role of Rocco. He agrees to help Warren Fox (Jamie Lomas) set Riley Costello (Rob Norbury) up. They place bets on various situations, when Rocco wins a bet he demands Riley steal his father's England squad cap. He threatens that he will hurt his girlfriend Mercedes Fisher (Jennifer Metcalfe), so Riley steals it. Warren continues the scam alone.
Johnny	4–5 May 2011	Ryan Gage	Johnny is a friend of Texas Longford's (Bianca Hendrickse-Spendlove) who pretends to be an art dealer, whilst helping her con Cindy out of her money
Colin Grimshaw	24–26 May 2011	Michael Mears	Mr. Grimshaw is known as "Creepy Colin" by Hollyoaks High students. He tutors Ruby Button (Anna Shaffer) to improve her reading and writing. She is unpleasant towards him, other students tease the pair about the time they spend together. Ruby tells headmaster Pete Hamill (Peter Mitchell) that Mr. Grimshaw has been inappropriately touching her. In his next lesson with Ruby, she verbally abuses him calling him a pervert and he slaps her in the face.
Andy	9 June 2011	Toby Parkes	Andy meets Jason Costello (Victoria Atkin) via a dating website. He goes on a date with him, but decides to have no further contact with him.
Leticia	14 June 2011	Natalie Jayne Betten	Leticia is an old friend of Mitzeee's (Rachel Shenton) who turned up at Riley Costello (Rob Norbury) and Mercedes Fisher's (Jennifer Metcalfe) engagement party. She came to get spotted flirting with Riley and did so successfully, which resulted in her being thrown out of Chez Chez by Riley's father Carl Costello (Paul Opacic).
Matt	28–30 June 2011	Philip Correia	Nurse Lynsey Nolan (Karen Hassan) met Matt at work and hearing he needed a place to stay, offered the spare room in her flat as she found him attractive. On his arrival, Lynsey and Cheryl Brady (Bronagh Waugh) both began to outrageously flirt with him but he later announced he was gay and moved out after declaring he had slept with Cheryl's brother, Brendan Brady (Emmett J. Scanlan).
Dr. Worth	30 June 2011	Christina Tam	Dr. Worth carries out an ultrasound scan and tells a shocked Mercedes Fisher (Jennifer Metcalfe) her baby is fine.
Mike	1 July 2011	Matt Martin	Mike is a rugby player who arrives at Cinergy for a massage. Mitzeee (Rachel Shenton) tells him they do sexual favours. When he asks Carmel Valentine (Gemma Merna) for extras, she throws him out of Cinergy and he runs away naked to another location to get dressed while the two women fight.
April	11 July 2011	Larissa Houghton	April spends the day drinking with Warren Fox (Jamie Lomas) unaware he is trying to make Mitzeee (Rachel Shenton) jealous. She then hooks up with Dodger Savage (Danny Mac).
Fugative	14 July 2011	As Himself	British rapper Fugative and television presenter Georgie Okell make a special cameo appearance backstage at T4 on the Beach, where Liberty Savage (Abi Phillips) is preparing to perform.
Georgie Okell	14 July 2011	As Herself	British rapper Fugative and television presenter Georgie Okell make a special cameo appearance backstage at T4 on the Beach, where Liberty Savage (Abi Phillips) is preparing to perform.
Sean	28–29 July 2011	Matt Kennedy	Brendan Brady (Emmett J. Scanlan) hires Sean a pretend boyfriend to make Ste Hay (Kieron Richardson) jealous and come onto Noah Baxter (Law Thompson). He annoys Brendan by touching him up and manages to lure Noah into the hot tub at Cinergy. Ste catches him kissing Noah. Brendan only pays him half of the money because he felt his leg. Sean is angered by the amount of money he receives, and tells Ste that he was paid to ruin his relationship with Noah.
Caravan man	29 July 2011	Jim Whelan	A man credited as "Caravan man" who catches Bart McQueen (Jonny Clarke) living in his holiday caravan.
Miriam	5 August	Meave Larkin	Miriam interviews Amy Barnes (Ashley Slanina-Davies) for nanny's job and offers her the job.
David	5 August	Phil Cheadle	David is Miriam's partner who offers Amy Barnes (Ashley Slanina-Davies) a job. Amy pretends she has passed her driving test, but David wants proof. Amy admits she lied and David tells her she can learn. However, Lee Hunter (Alex Carter) accuses David of flirting with Amy, so he takes back his job offer.
Toby	5 September 2011	Alex Roe	Toby is Maddie Morrison's (Scarlett Bowman) boyfriend who arrives at the new sixth form student party. He kisses Sinead O'Connor (Stephanie Davis) and is seen by Maddie. He tells Maddie he is sorry but she ends their relationship.
Jade	29–30 September 2011	Caroline Read	Jade appears when she has a one-night stand with Barney Harper-McBride (Tom Scurr).
Registrar	17 October 2011	Jason Furnival	The registrar attempts to perform the wedding between Mercedes Fisher (Jennifer Metcalfe) and Riley Costello (Rob Norbury).
Security guard	11 November 2011	Andrew French	A security guard working on the door of the Wretch 32 gig. He tries to prevent Bart McQueen (Jonny Clarke) from entering the venue.
Wretch 32	11 November 2011	As Himself	Wretch 32 sings at a concert attended by the sixth form students where Bart McQueen (Jonny Clarke) interrupts his performance to confess his love to Sinead O'Connor (Stephanie Davis) in front of her current boyfriend Gaz Bennett (Joel Goonan).
Etta Bond	11 November 2011	As Herself	Etta Bond cameo's alongside Wretch 32 at the concert the college students attend.
Wretch 32's band	11 November 2011	As themselves	Wretch 32's band who perform alongside him. The band consists of Sherelle McKenzie, Trevor Francis, Kola Bello, Steven McKenzie, Tim Steer, Luke Harris and Nathaniel Fuller
Harvey	14 November 2011	Aaron Cobham	Harvey attends the village memorial for the victims of the serial killer Silas Blissett (Jeff Rawle) and stands in the background holding a candle.
Tara Peters	9–16 December 2011	Alex Childs	Tara is the ex-girlfriend of Callum Kane (Laurie Duncan) who arrives in the village to see him. Tara convinces Callum to give their relationship another chance. They decide to move away together, though when they attempt to leave Maddie Morrison (Scarlett Bowman) convinces Callum to be with her instead and Tara leaves.
Niles	29–30 December 2011	David Peart	Niles is the butler at the home of Barney Harper-McBride (Tom Scurr), who serves the rest of the students with drinks and keeps a watch over Barney.
Angus McBride	29–30 December 2011	Edward Peel	Angus is the father of Barney Harper-McBride (Tom Scurr) who arrives home early from his annual vacation. Angus tells Barney that he would rather that he studied closer to home. He is annoyed when Barney chooses his friends over his family and cuts off Barney's supply of money.
Judith McBride	29–30 December 2011	Caroline Langrishe	Judith is the mother of Barney Harper-McBride (Tom Scurr) who arrives home early from her annual vacation. Judith thinks that Barney is in a relationship with Ash Kane (Holly Weston) and does not approve of her dress sense. Judith insults Barney's friends and tells Barney he should study closer to home. She continues to belittle Barney and his friends become annoyed with her sobbery. Barney retaliates by choosing his friends over his family.
