= Liberty Savage =

Fictional character from Hollyoaks

- Hollyoaks character
- Jessamy Stoddart as Liberty Savage (2018)
- Portrayed by: Abi Phillips (2010–2013); Jessamy Stoddart (2018−2026)
- Duration: 2010–2013, 2018–2022, 2024–2026
- First appearance: 10 December 2010
- Last appearance: 26 May 2026
- Introduced by: Paul Marquess (2010); Bryan Kirkwood (2018); Hannah Cheers and Angelo Abela (2024)
- Spin-off appearances: Hollyoaks Later (2020)
- Crossover appearances: Brookside (2025)
- Abi Phillips as Liberty Savage (2013)
In-universe information
- Occupation: Singer; business owner
- Father: Dirk Savage
- Mother: Anna Blake
- Stepfather: Patrick Blake
- Stepmother: Cindy Cunningham
- Brothers: Will Savage
- Half-brothers: Dodger Savage
- Half-sisters: Sienna Blake
- Daughters: Faith Hudson-Savage
- Nephews: Sebastian Blake
- Nieces: Nico Blake; Myra-Pocahontas Savage-McQueen; Sophie Blake
- First cousins: Dennis Savage
- Other relatives: Tori Devine-Banks

Liberty Savage is a fictional character from the British Channel 4 soap opera Hollyoaks, played by actress and singer-songwriter Abi Phillips from 2010 to 2013, and Jessamy Stoddart from 2018. She made her first on-screen appearance on 10 December 2010. Phillips was approached by Hollyoaks producers after she submitted one of her songs to be played on the show. Following a strong response to the song, producers invited her to audition for the role of Liberty, in which she was successful. Liberty was introduced to Hollyoaks along with her fiancé, Ethan Scott (Craig Vye). On her arrival her on-screen family was introduced, her two brothers, Dodger (Danny Mac) and Will Savage (James Atherton) and their father Dirk Savage (David Kennedy). Phillips performed at T4 on the Beach, performing as two people, as while Liberty got her big break, Phillips also performed her own solo material. In October 2011, Liberty's family was expanded with her cousin Dennis Savage (Joe Tracini) being introduced. After an absence of four months during 2013, it was announced that Liberty would be written out of the serial, and she departed on 24 July 2013. On 22 May 2018, it was announced that Liberty would return, but this time with Stoddart in the role, and she returned on 5 June 2018. Stoddart went on maternity leave in December 2022, with the character of Liberty returning on 5th February 2024. Stoddart went on maternity leave 2 years later with Liberty departing in the episode airing on 26 May 2026.

Since her reintroduction in 2018, her storylines have included Dirk's death at the hands of Milo Entwistle (Nathan Morris), relationships with Sami Maalik (Rishi Nair) and Damon Kinsella (Jacob Roberts), becoming a surrogate for Sienna and Brody Hudson (Adam Woodward); she gives birth to Faith Hudson-Savage but decides to keep her, while also suffering from postpartum psychosis. In 2025, Liberty begins a relationship with Jeremy Blake (Jeremy Sheffield), unaware that he is a serial killer. On 22 October 2025 Liberty appeared in the crossover with Brookside. In January 2026 Liberty was paired with Brookside character Tim O'Leary as the character transferred over to Hollyoaks.

== Storylines ==
=== 2010–2013 ===
Liberty first appears in Hollyoaks when she is sent to the school headmaster's office for singing in class. In 2011, her family arrived at Hollyoaks right after she discover that her family lost their home, since her father Dirk didn't pay the bills, and moved to McQueen House, just before the Savage Boat House in 2012. She meets Theresa McQueen (Jorgie Porter) and they bond. Liberty reveals that Ethan Scott, who Theresa has become attracted to, is her fiancé. Ethan begins ignoring Liberty's phone calls and she assumes that he is going to end their relationship. Theresa then decides to help Liberty and Ethan reconcile and prepares a meal for them with Ethan. Liberty sees them and slaps Theresa, assuming that they are having an affair. Theresa's cousin Carmel Valentine (Gemma Merna) finds Liberty and explains that Theresa was preparing a meal for her and Ethan. Liberty then apologises to Theresa.

Liberty begins planning her and Ethan's engagement party. Ethan and his friend Noah Baxter (Law Thompson) start playing pranks on one another. Noah covers the toilet seat with cling film and Liberty uses the toilet, subsequently urinating on her clothes. Noah apologises to Liberty and arranges for Chez Chez nightclub to hold the engagement party. Liberty returns home to find her house boarded up and her brother, Dodger tells her that it has been repossessed. Dodger explains that he has found the family somewhere to live. He then takes Liberty blindfolded to 26 Leigh Road, the McQueen family's house, as they are in Tenerife. Liberty refuses to stay as she cannot squat in Theresa's house. Ethan allows Liberty to stay with him. She then decorates the flat with her belongings, which annoys Ethan's flatmates Noah and Doug Carter (PJ Brennan). Noah and Doug tell Ethan that Liberty cannot stay with them. Ethan then tells Liberty that she cannot stay and promises to find her somewhere to live. The McQueen's return from Tenerife early to find that the locks have been changed on the house. Myra McQueen (Nicole Barber-Lane) demands that Liberty and her family leave and Liberty apologises to her. However, Myra meets Liberty's father, Dirk and decides to let the family stay temporarily. The family set up camp in their back yard after Myra discovers Dodger killed her pet lamb for food though Theresa allows Liberty to stay in her room.

Liberty tries to set up Theresa with her brother Will. They go on a date, and later study together but they do not get together. Liberty sends them off on a bus to a concert, fooling them both into thinking they were going with her. Theresa and Will end up in a hotel room however nothing happens. Ethan then turns up looking for Liberty, however Will gets the wrong idea thinking he's coming for Theresa and the boys fight. Will leaves, and Ethan tells Theresa while alone that he cannot leave Liberty as he slept with her when she was 15, and if she reported him, he could lose his job. Liberty and Ethan break up, but later get back together. Ethan in secret dates Theresa, though he keeps the relationships secret, but Theresa suspects he is cheating and follows him and spots him with Rae Wilson (Alice Barlow). Theresa goes back home and confesses to Liberty that it was Ethan who was with Rae, Liberty is shocked by Ethan's deceit. Theresa and Liberty decided to remain friends. They go to tell Rae about Ethan and she suggests they get revenge on him. Liberty is shocked when Dodger's real father and twin sister Patrick Blake (Jeremy Sheffield) and Sienna Blake (Anna Passey) arrive on the boat, but is determined to unite the Savages and Blakes and invites them round for dinner to build bridges and become a close family unit.

In 2013, Liberty was devastated when her brother Will falls down the stairs at the Chez Chez, during the engagement party of her father and Myra, and was paralysed. She blamed Texas for pushing him at the stairs. She warmed to Will's carer Anna, but was shocked to realise that she was her mother and rejected her presence. Fed up with her bolshy attitude, Dirk had a row with her and advised her to start afresh and do some travelling. She returned to Hollyoaks and announced to her family that she had a record deal and was asked to move Los Angeles to start a career. A party was held before she left in a taxi, but was interrupted by Nancy & Sienna as they were fighting over for their relationship with Darren. Will tried to contact Liberty for his wedding, but couldn't attend due to work commitments.

=== 2018– ===
Liberty (now played by Jessamy Stoddart) turns up at Dirk and Cindy Cunningham's (Stephanie Waring) house escorted by police. She explains that she caused a scene on the plane. She asks if she can stay but Cindy is against the idea. However, Cindy later allows her to stay but Liberty is acting suspicious. Milo Entwistle (Nathan Morris), Cindy's lodger, witnesses Liberty being bundled into a car and calls the police. It is later revealed that Liberty stole expensive hard drives from her ex-boyfriend Kelvin who cheated on her. Milo develops feelings for Liberty and asks her out for lunch with the help of Brody Hudson (Adam Woodward), but Liberty is attracted to Brody. Brody tells Liberty that Milo fancies her and Liberty goes home and kisses him, shocking Dirk. Liberty is horrified when she finds out that Milo has been tracking her stepsister Holly Cunningham (Amanda Clapham) around the village and breaks up with him. Liberty starts a relationship with Brody and is furious when she finds out he slept with a stripper. At Holly and Damon Kinsella's (Jacob Roberts) wedding, Damon confesses to sleeping with Cindy, leaving everyone shocked. Dirk and Milo argue and Milo pushes Dirk into the pool. He turns on a faulty light box, electrocuting Dirk. Liberty, along with Cindy and Tom Cunningham (Ellis Hollins), find Dirk dead.

== Development ==
In December 2010, it was announced that Phillips had joined the cast of Hollyoaks as Liberty Savage. Phillips came to the attention of Hollyoaks producers after submitting her song "Missing You" to be used on the show. The song was used in established character Steph Cunningham's (Carley Stenson) final episode, in which she died in a fire. Phillips penned the song after being inspired by Steph's cervical cancer storyline. Following a strong response to the song, producers invited Phillips to audition for the role of Liberty, a character they had been developing for "some time" and she was successful. Liberty made her first appearance on 10 December 2010. Channel Four described Liberty as being "beautiful, bubbly but very spoilt". Matalan described her as 'much wronged'. When the Hollyoaks titles were updated, Liberty was included along with Ethan, Will and Dodger. The producers took advantage of Phillips singing skills, and got her to sing of Adele's 'Make You Feel My Love' (originally written and recorded by Bob Dylan). Daniel Kilkelly from Digital Spy called it a 'show stopping performance'. On 18 June 2011 it was revealed that Liberty was to perform on stage at T4 On The Beach taking Theresa and Ethan with her. It was then said that Philips will become the first person to perform as two people, as while Liberty gets her big break, Phillips will also perform her own solo material. Speaking of this Philips said, I'm so excited to perform at T4 On The Beach. It will be my biggest audience to date so it's a little scary but I just can't wait to get out there and perform. I hope the fans like the episode of Hollyoaks too. I love the idea of dropping in my scenes from T4OTB in episodes just two days later. It's going to be tight but it's all very exciting!" The episode aired on 14 July 2011.

=== Relationships ===
==== Ethan Scott and Theresa McQueen ====
Before she entered Hollyoaks, it was revealed that Liberty was engaged to fellow newcomer Ethan Scott (Craig Vye). Vye said "It's quite a casual relationship to begin with - she thinks about it more seriously than [he does]. She thinks that [they're] engaged." A love triangle between Liberty, Ethan and Theresa McQueen (Jorgie Porter) is formed. Liberty becomes friends with Theresa, but Theresa meets Ethan and a mutual attraction between them grows. In April 2011, Liberty and Ethan have their engagement party. Vye told soap opera reporting magazine Soaplife that Ethan is in love with Liberty, but does not love her enough to marry her. "There is a point where [Theresa and Ethan] share a moment and realise something could happen between them." Vye teased the love triangle saying, "Liberty has been quite needy with the whole wedding thing, but Ethan sees her in a different light when she gets all standoffish with him," Vye told Soaplife of the storyline. "He sees her sing at Chez Chez and it's clear he's still smitten." he confirmed that he and Liberty were going to get back together saying, "He's fallen for Theresa yet part of him still loves Liberty," he said. "They share a kiss and it looks like they're secretly back on." Vye finished saying that Ethan's actions could end badly. Ethan got his comeuppance on 22 July 2011.

==== Family ====
In March 2011, media entertainment website Digital Spy reported that Liberty's brothers, Will (James Atherton) and Dodger (Danny Mac) and father Dirk (David Kennedy), would be introduced. The website said the family would cause chaos following their arrival. Of the family, a Hollyoaks statement said: "The new family will take the village by storm and are set to rub all the McQueens up the wrong way. The Savage family get evicted from their home when Dirk can't keep up with the payments. Liberty is furious to come home and find her house all boarded up but big brother Dodger has a new house for them to live in! While the McQueens are away on holiday, Dodger moves his family into the empty house and declares squatters' rights! How will the McQueens react to their new housemates?" It was later revealed Joe Tracini had been cast as Liberty's cousin Dennis. Talking about Dennis's relationship with Liberty, Tracini talked to Digital Spy in an interview saying, "Liberty loves him. Liberty tends to just go through life and accept things, so she's a big fan of Dennis's, which is nice.

=== Departure ===
On 13 July 2013, executive producer Bryan Kirkwood announced that Liberty would be written out of Hollyoaks. He explained that following her on-screen absence she will make a "brief return". Liberty secures a record deal and Dennis and Leanne hold a surprise leaving party for her. All of Liberty's family attend, and Liberty later leaves for Los Angeles to follow her dream of becoming a singer.

=== Reintroduction ===
On 22 May 2018, it was announced that Liberty would be reintroduced with the role being recast to Jessamy Stoddart. A spokesperson for Hollyoaks confirmed the recasting: "Liberty later left Hollyoaks to pursue a music career in LA after landing a record deal, but the reality of the LA dream turned out to be a little less shiny than she had anticipated and it's time to return home. She has missed her family and is excited to make up for lost time with Dirk and get to know her extended family better. Just like she did when she was younger, she will be the glue that holds the family together." Stoddart's debut scenes as Liberty aired on 5 June 2018.

== Reception ==
Porter (Theresa) praised both the characters of Ethan and Liberty for being introduced saying,"Yeah, it's been really good. When new people start, you remember what it was like for you when you first joined the show and all of the new things you experienced. You feel for them as well, because they've come into a big crowd of people and they don't know anyone's name. Craig and Abi have been fun to work with.". In 2018, Jessamy was nominated for best newcomer at the Inside Soap Awards. She was later longlisted for "Best Comic Performance" at the 2024 Inside Soap Awards. She was longlisted for the same award at the 2025 Inside Soap Awards.
