= Jessamy Stoddart =

English actress

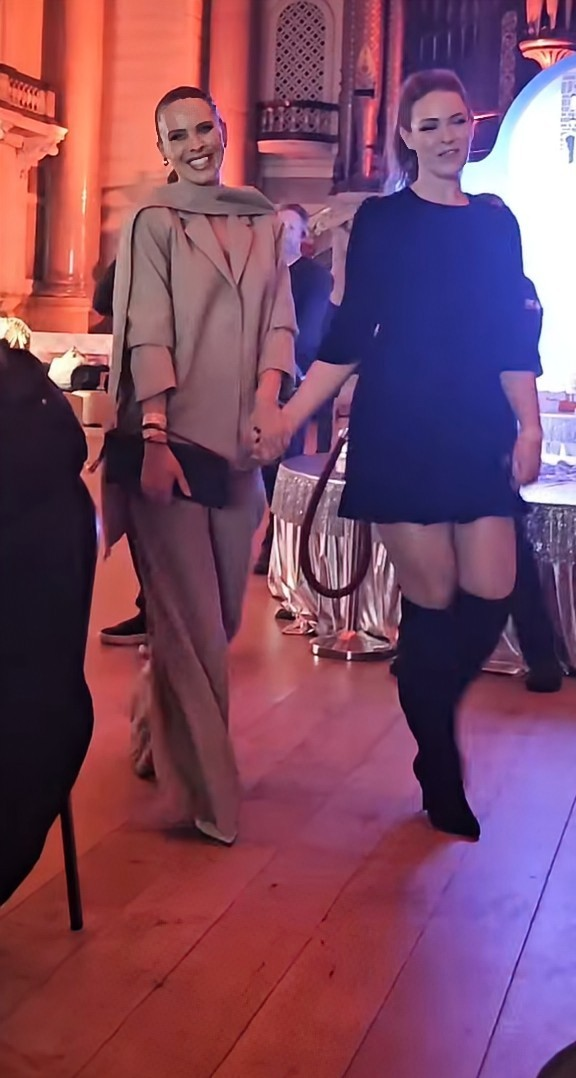
- Stoddart (left) pictured with Anna Passey
- Born: Jessamy Helen Stoddart; 20 June 1993 (age 32); London Borough of Barking and Dagenham, Essex, England
- Education: National Youth Music Theatre; Guildford School of Acting
- Occupation: Actress
- Years active: 2016–present
- Television: Hollyoaks
- Spouse: Ryan O'Gorman (m. 2021)
- Children: 2

Jessamy Helen Stoddart (born 20 June 1993) is an English actress. She is known for taking over the role of Liberty Savage in the Channel 4 soap opera Hollyoaks, having portrayed the role since 2018. Prior to joining the soap, Stoddart appeared in numerous theatre productions, including Legally Blonde, Mack and Mabel, Follies and Songs for a New World.

== Early and personal life ==
Stoddart was born on 20 June 1993 in the London Borough of Barking and Dagenham. She studied at the National Youth Music Theatre and the Guildford School of Acting, graduating from the latter in 2014. Stoddart announced her engagement to her long-term partner Ryan O'Gorman in December 2020. The couple got married in November 2021. In August 2022, Stoddart announced that she and O'Gorman were expecting their first child. Their daughter was born on 4 January 2023. Stoddart announced her second pregnancy in December 2025.

== Career ==
Stoddart began her career in stage productions and musicals, and portrayed characters such as Vivienne in Legally Blonde, Mabel in Mack and Mabel, a young Phyllis in Follies and Company in Songs for a New World. She has also appeared in various ensemble roles and as an understudy in Little Women, Les Misérables and Wicked. In 2016, she made her television debut in an episode of the Channel 4 sitcom The Windsors, portraying a witch in the fourth episode of the first series.

In June 2018, Stoddart joined the cast of the Channel 4 soap opera Hollyoaks, taking over the role of Liberty Savage, who had previously been portrayed by Abi Phillips. Since joining the soap, her storylines have included coming to terms with the death of the character's father Dirk Savage (David Kennedy), agreeing to be a surrogate and suffering from post-partum psychosis. For her portrayal of Liberty, she was nominated for Best Comedy Performance at the British Soap Awards in 2019, but lost out to Sarah Moyle who plays Valerie Pitman in Doctors.

== Filmography ==
Year	Title	Role	Notes	Ref.
2016	The Windsors	Witch	1 episode	
2018	The Common	Cesca	Film	
2018–2022, 2024–2026	Hollyoaks	Liberty Savage	Regular role	

== Stage ==
Title	Role	Ref(s)
Legally Blonde	Vivienne	
Water Babies	Mrs D	
Mack and Mabel	Mabel	
Follies	Young Phyllis	
Songs for a New World	Company	
Little Women	Swing/Ensemble	
Les Misérables in Concert: The 25th Anniversary	Ensemble / 2nd Cover Fantine	
Les Misérables	Ensemble / 1st Cover Fantine	
Wicked	Ensemble and Cover Elphaba	

== Awards and nominations ==
Year	Award	Category	Work	Result	Ref(s)
2019	British Soap Awards	Best Comedy Performance	Hollyoaks	Nominated	
