= James Atherton =

British actor (born 1987)

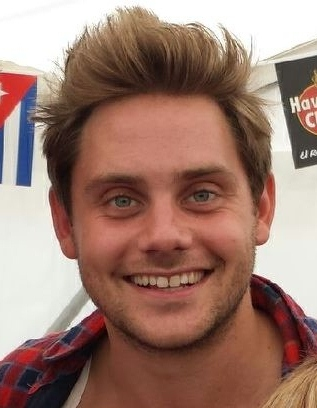
- James Atherton in 2013
- Born: James Conway; 16 July 1987 (age 38); Cumbria, England
- Occupation: Actor
- Years active: 2009–present
- Television: Hollyoaks; Coronation Street

James Atherton (born James Conway; 16 July 1987) is an English actor, known for his roles as Will Savage on Hollyoaks and Jamie Bowman on Coronation Street. In 2017, he appeared in the stage production of Rita, Sue and Bob Too. In 2019, he played Tim Collins in Ackley Bridge and Dr. McKenzie in the Dave sitcom Porters.

== Early life ==
Atherton grew up in the Cumbrian village of Talkin and attended Austin Friars School in nearby Carlisle.

== Career ==
On television, Atherton played the serial killer Will Savage in Hollyoaks from 2011 to 2015 and joined the cast of Coronation Street as Jamie Bowman in October 2015.

On stage, he co-starred as title character Bob in the Out of Joint Theatre Company's revival of Andrea Dunbar's play Rita, Sue and Bob Too, which opened at the Octagon Theatre, Bolton, in September 2017 before touring the UK, and later played at the Royal Court Theatre in January 2018. In January 2019, he appeared as Keiran in "Blindspot", an episode of the ITV crime drama Vera. Later that year, he appeared in the third series of Ackley Bridge as Tim Collins.

== Filmography ==
Key
†	Denotes works that have not yet been released

=== Film ===
Year	Title	Role	Notes
2017	Babs	Cliff	TV film
2018	Macbeth	Second Murderer	
2020	Paper Boy	Jacob	Short film
TBA	Slammer†	John Howlett	Completed

=== Television ===
Year	Title	Role	Notes
2010	Inspector George Gently	David Swift	Episode: "Peace and Love"
2011	Hollyoaks Later	Will Savage	Series 4, Episode 5
2011–2015	Hollyoaks	Will Savage	Series regular; 245 episodes
2015	Casualty	Luke Krieger	Episode: "Objectum Sexual"
2015–2016	Coronation Street	Jamie Bowman	Recurring role; 20 episodes
2017	Midsomer Murders	Jensen Marsh	Episode: "Crime and Punishment"
2017–2019	Porters	Dr. McKenzie	Recurring role; 4 episodes
2019	Vera	Kieran Webb	Episode: "Blind Spot"
2019	Krypton	Sagitari One	Episode: "Ghost in the Fire"
2019	Ackley Bridge	Tim Collins	Recurring role; 3 episodes
2019	Sanditon	Fred Robinson	Recurring role; 5 episodes
2020	The Jewish Enquirer	North London Clarkson	Episode: "Bad Hair Day"
2023	Van der Valk	Valentijn Meijer	Episode: "Magic in Amsterdam"
2023	The Lazarus Project	Michael	Episodes: S02E02, S02E04

== Theatre credits ==
Year	Title	Role	Notes	Ref
2008	Treasure Island	Tom Morgan	Theatre Royal Haymarket, London	
2009	Wallenstein	Kinsky	Minerva Theatre, Chichester	
2014	Crocodiles	Vincent	Royal Exchange, Manchester	
2017	Rita, Sue and Bob Too	Bob	Octagon Theatre, Bolton	
2024	The Other Boleyn Girl	Henry VIII	Chichester Festival Theatre, Chichester	
