= T4 on the Beach =

2003–2012 British annual music festival

- Genre: Pop, alternative rock, hip-hop
- Dates: July (2003, 2007–2012); June (2004–2006)
- Locations: Great Yarmouth, England, UK (2003–2004); Weston-super-Mare, England, UK (2005–2012)
- Years active: 2003–2012
- Founders: Channel 4
- Website: Official website (Archive copy)

T4 on the Beach was an annual British one-day music event which was held on the beach at Weston-super-Mare and televised on Channel 4. The event began in 2003 as Pop Beach in Great Yarmouth, changing to the current title and venue in 2005.

The day consisted of a number of major contemporary pop and rock music acts from the UK and overseas, performing short sets in front of an audience of over 40,000. In addition to the main stage a smaller 4Music stage has provided a platform for newer upcoming bands, renamed in 2010 to the T4 Sessions stage.

== Pop Beach 2003 ==
The first ever event was held in Great Yarmouth on 13 July 2003. Performers included Blue ("All Rise" and "Breathe Easy"), Girls Aloud ("No Good Advice" and "Life Got Cold"), Siobhan Donaghy ("Overrated"), Daniel Bedingfield, Jamelia, Mis-Teeq, Big Brovaz, Lisa Maffia and Melanie Blatt.

== Pop Beach 2004 ==
The second event was held in Great Yarmouth on 6 June 2004. Performers included Girls Aloud ("The Show" and "Jump"), Supergrass, Goldfrapp, Shaznay, Javine Hylton, Speedway, Lemar, The Blue Boys, Ash, Emma Bunton ("Maybe"), Blue ("Curtain Falls"), Peter Andre ("Mysterious Girl") and McFly ("Five Colours in Her Hair").

== T4 on the Beach 2005 ==
The third event took place in Weston-super-Mare for the first time on 19 June 2005. Acts performing at the 2005 event included: Daniel Bedingfield, Rachel Stevens, Kaiser Chiefs, Madness, Athlete, Rooster, Lemar, Goldie Lookin Chain, Mario, Audio Bullys, Doves, Akon, Feeder, Garbage and Tony Christie featuring Peter Kay.

== T4 on the Beach 2006 ==
The fourth event took place on 18 June 2006. Acts performing at the 2006 event included: All American Rejects, The Automatic, Basement Jaxx, Busta Rhymes, Dannii Minogue, Embrace, The Feeling, Frank, Feeder, Kelis, Lily Allen, Matt Willis, McFly, Ne-Yo, Orson, Pet Shop Boys, The Pussycat Dolls, Razorlight, Shayne Ward, Simon Webbe, Will Young and The Zutons.

== T4 on the Beach 2007 ==
The fifth event took place on 22 July 2007. Acts performing at the 2007 event included: MAMI, Maroon 5, Manic Street Preachers, Akon, Natasha Bedingfield, Mika, Amerie, Girls Aloud, McFly, Just Jack, Calvin Harris, Mutya Buena, Dizzee Rascal, Funeral for a Friend, Kate Nash, Super Furry Animals, Reverend and The Makers, Sophie Ellis-Bextor, Athlete, The Pigeon Detectives, Badly Drawn Boy, Mark Ronson, The Maccabees, Hadouken!, Jamie Scott and the Town, Remi Nicole, The Hoosiers and The Twang.

== T4 on the Beach 2008 ==
The sixth event took place on 20 July 2008 with the usual presenters. Acts performing at the 2008 event included: Lil' Chris, Basshunter, The Zutons, Kelly Rowland, Ne-Yo, Scouting for Girls, The Hoosiers, Robyn, The Feeling, The Pigeon Detectives, McFly, Guillemots, Alphabeat, Feeder, The Ting Tings, Reverend and The Makers, OneRepublic, One Night Only, Sugababes, Dirty Pretty Things, Black Kids, Five O'Clock Heroes featuring Agyness Deyn, Lightspeed Champion, The Automatic, The Script, Envy & Other Sins and One eskimo.

== T4 on the Beach 2009 ==
The seventh event took place on 19 July 2009. Acts at the 2009 event included: Alesha Dixon, Metro Station, Dizzee Rascal, Gossip, Calvin Harris, Tinchy Stryder featuring Amelle Berrabah, N-Dubz, The Noisettes, JLS, Will Young, Taio Cruz, Diversity, Basement Jaxx, Florence and the Machine, Daniel Merriweather, DJ Ironik featuring Chipmunk, Shontelle, Sophie Ellis-Bextor, Peter Andre, The Courteeners, The Saturdays, Hockey, Frankmusik, Tommy Reilly, Fightstar, Paloma Faith, The Maccabees, Newham Generals featuring Dizzee Rascal, Killa Kela, Little Boots, The Enemy and Master Shortie.

== T4 on the Beach 2010 ==
The eighth event took place on 4 July 2010. Acts performing at the 2010 event included: Dizzee Rascal, Ellie Goulding, Tinie Tempah, Professor Green, Chipmunk, Scouting for Girls, The Saturdays, Basshunter, Pixie Lott, Jason Derulo, Alexandra Burke, Iyaz, Jedward, Kids in Glass Houses, N-Dubz, Diana Vickers, Taio Cruz, Kelis, JLS, Plan B, Example, The Hoosiers, One Night Only, Tinchy Stryder, Gabriella Cilmi and Diagram of the Heart.

== T4 on the Beach 2011 ==
The ninth event took place on 10 July 2011. Both JLS and Jessie J were scheduled to appear, but were unable to attend. Jessie had to pull out due to doctor's orders after breaking her foot, and JLS had to pull out after technical problems which resulted in them being unable to soundcheck earlier on in the day.

The hosts and presenters were Nick Grimshaw and Jameela Jamil.

At the event, the cast of Hollyoaks filmed a special episode, in which Liberty Savage (Abi Phillips) performs live on the T4 stage, while Ethan Scott (Craig Vye) and Theresa McQueen (Jorgie Porter) are kissing behind her back.

Performers included:

- Olly Murs ("Thinking of Me" and "Busy")
- McFly ("Shine A Light")
- Nicola Roberts ("Beat of My Drum")
- Cher Lloyd ("Swagger Jagger")
- The Wanted ("Glad You Came" and "All Time Low")
- Tinchy Stryder featuring Dappy ("Spaceship" and "Number 1")
- Jason Derulo ("Ridin' Solo")
- Ronan Parke ("Forget You")
- Chipmunk ("Champion")
- Sugababes ("Freedom" and "About A Girl")
- Wretch 32 ("Traktor" and "Unorthodox" featuring Example)
- N-Dubz ("I Need You", "Playing With Fire", "Best Behaviour" and "Girls")
- The View
- The Wombats
- Katy B
- Alexis Jordan
- The Midnight Beast
- Aloe Blacc ("I Need a Dollar")
- Parade
- Mann
- Hard Fi
- Far East Movement
- Scouting For Girls

== T4 on the Beach 2012 ==
The tenth anniversary event was held on 1 July 2012. As a celebration, a quiz was held featuring past and present T4 presenters, who were asked to answer questions on ten years of the event. Vernon Kay was due to appear, but had to cancel due to other commitments. Rick Edwards and June Sarpong were guest presenters along with regulars Nick Grimshaw, Jameela Jamil, Georgie Okel, Will Best and Matt Edmondson. It was the final edition to be held prior to the closure of T4 on 29 December 2012.

Performers included:

- The Wanted ("All Time Low", "Glad You Came", "Lightning" and "Chasing The Sun")
- Tulisa ("Young" and A Mix Of N-Dubz Songs)
- Cover Drive ("Twilight" and "Sparks")
- Maverick Sabre ("Let Me Go")
- Stooshe ("Love Me" and "Black Heart")
- Wretch 32 ("Traktor", "Don't Go" with Josh Kumra, and "Hush Little Baby")
- Alexandra Burke ("Let It Go", "Elephant")
- Conor Maynard ("Can't Say No" and "Vegas Girl")
- Taio Cruz ("There She Goes", "Troublemaker" and "Break Your Heart")
- DJ Fresh ("Louder" featuring Fleur East, "The Power" and "Hot Right Now" featuring Rita Ora)
- Rita Ora ("R.I.P." and "How We Do (Party)")
- Professor Green featuring Ruth-Anne Cunningham ("Read All About It", "Remedy" and "Just Be Good To Green")
- Marina and the Diamonds ("Primadonna" and "Power and Control")
- Skepta ("Make Peace Not War")
- Little Mix ("Wings")
- Lawson ("When She Was Mine" and "Taking Over Me")
- Dappy ("No Regrets" and "Rockstar")
- Labrinth ("Express Yourself", "Let the Sun Shine", and "Earthquake" featuring Wretch 32)
- Josh Osho ("Redemption Days")
- Rizzle Kicks ("Dreamers", "Mama Do The Hump", "Down with the Trumpets" and "When I Was A Youngster")

Celebrity guests who attended the event included the cast of Made in Chelsea, Hollyoaks and Coronation Street, former T4 presenters Rick Edwards and June Sarpong, and dog act Ashleigh and Pudsey.

== Proposed future concert ==
The axing of T4 in December 2012 cast doubt over whether the event would continue. In October 2012, media outlets reported that the concert had been axed, with Channel 4 bosses reportedly looking at hosting a new live music event. In May 2013, the producers of T4 on the Beach, Done + Dusted, announced they would be organising a new event called Summer Sets on the Beach to be held in Weston-super-Mare in August 2013. Live coverage would be broadcast on ITV2 with a highlights show to be broadcast on ITV. Tickets for the event went sale on 23 May; however, on 31 May it was announced that the concert had been cancelled due to a lack of ticket sales.

== See also ==
- T4 (Channel 4)
