= Abi Phillips =

English singer and actress (born 1994)

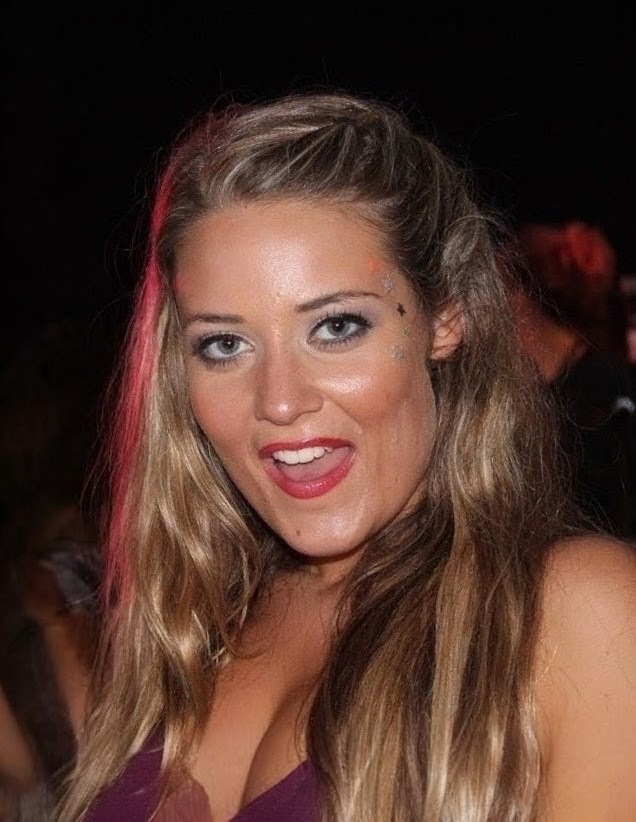
- Phillips in 2012
- Born: Abigail Louise Phillips; 14 January 1994 (age 32); Sutton Coldfield, Birmingham, England
- Occupations: Singer; actress
- Years active: 2010–present
- Partner: Gav Gilly (m. 2025)
- Musical career
- Instruments: Vocals
- Label: Transmission
- Website: www.abiphillipsmusic.co.uk

Abigail Louise Phillips (born 14 January 1994) is an English singer and actress. She portrayed Liberty Savage in the Channel 4 soap opera Hollyoaks from 2010 to 2013, during which time she released the song "Summer Sunshine".

== Early and personal life ==
Phillips was born in the Birmingham town of Sutton Coldfield, to Richard and Linda Phillips. Phillips was a student at Birmingham's Stage Coach performing arts school.

In 2011, Phillips began a relationship with Gav Gilly. They announced their engagement in 2023, before getting married in 2025. In March 2012, Phillips, along with some of the Hollyoaks cast and crew, successfully completed a sponsored sleep-out in a bid to raise funds for the youth homelessness charity Centrepoint.

In May 2022, Phillips announced that she had been diagnosed with thyroid cancer. On 10 September 2023, Phillips was attacked and robbed after sustaining injuries in Ibiza, which resulted in her phone being stolen.

== Career ==
Phillips wrote a song for the Channel 4 soap opera Hollyoaks titled "Missing You", which they featured in the character Steph Cunningham's (Carley Stenson) death scene. Phillips penned the song after being inspired by Steph's cervical cancer storyline and later submitted it to be used on the show. Following a strong response to the track, Hollyoaks bosses arranged a meeting with Phillips and subsequently invited her to audition for the part of Liberty Savage, a musical character they had been developing. She debuted as Liberty at the age of 16 in December 2010.

In 2011, Phillips released her debut single, "Summer Sunshine" featuring rapper Fugative. She performed it at T4 on the Beach 2011, in which she performed on the sessions stage. The scenes of Phillips' performance aired on Hollyoaks shortly afterwards. In 2013, Phillips was axed from Hollyoaks and the character was written out until 2018, when Jessamy Stoddart assumed the role. Since departing from the soap, she has focused on singing instead of acting. She considers Adele as one of her musical idols and has cited Wynter Gordon and Ellie Goulding as her musical influences. From 2013 to 2014, Phillips completed a tour of primary schools in the West Midlands to speak about bullying and the effects it has on young people, drawing from past personal experience. Phillips appeared on The Voice UK as a contestant in 2017, although was unsuccessful in getting a place in the competition.

== Filmography ==
Year	Title	Role	Notes
2010–2013	Hollyoaks	Liberty Savage	Regular role
2017	The Voice UK	Herself	Contestant
2025	Mr. Men Little Miss Mini Adventures	Little Miss Sunshine / Little Miss Princess	Voice roles
