= David Kennedy (actor) =

English actor

- Born: David Kennedy; 1964 (age 61–62); London, England
- Occupation: Actor
- Years active: 1992–present
- Notable work: Hollyoaks (2011–2018)

David Kennedy (born 1964) is a British actor, known for his role as Dirk Savage in the Channel 4 soap opera Hollyoaks.

== Career ==
Since graduating from Webber Douglas Academy of Dramatic Art in 1992, Kennedy has appeared in over 50 television dramas including Ashes to Ashes, Trial & Retribution, Ultimate Force, The Bill, London's Burning, Rose and Maloney, Waking the Dead, and Holby City. He also played the role of Billy 'Two Hats' in William and Mary for three series. He has also played two roles in EastEnders; Dave Roberts in 2002, and Ray in 2006.

Kennedy has also appeared in several films including Reign of Fire in 2002 and in the 2010 remake of Clash of the Titans. Kennedy appeared in season 1 of Marcella.

From 2011 to 2018, he portrayed the role of Dirk Savage in Hollyoaks.

In 2020, he appeared in an episode of the BBC drama series Moving On, the ITV drama series Liar and he played the role of DCS Phil Adams in the ITV drama, Honour.

== Filmography ==
=== Film ===
Year	Title	Role	Notes
1982	Vortex	Comgressman White	
1994	Mary Shelley's Frankenstein	Ship's crew	
1996	Grim	Mary's husband	
1997	The Fifth Element	Flying Cop	
1998	Love Is the Devil: Study for a Portrait of Francis Bacon	Joe Furneval	
2000	Gangster No. 1	Fat Charlie	
2000	Shiner	Chris	
2001	Down	Security Guard #3 (Duane)	
2002	Shooters	Sergeant Webb	
2002	Reign of Fire	Eddie Stax	
2005	The Cave	Ian – Caver #2	
2005	Brothers of the Head	Paul Day – present day	
2006	Copying Beethoven	Neighbor	
2006	Attack Force	Dwayne Dixon	Direct to video
2007	Wednesday	Dad	Short film
2009	Mr Nobody	Thug 2	
2010	Clash of the Titans	Kepheus' General	
2011	Demons Never Die	Amber's father	
2014	Peterman	Charlie Graves	
2020	Lurker	Lou	Short film
2023	The Bricklayer	Foreman	

=== Television ===
Year	Title	Role	Notes
1993	Frank Stubbs Promotes	2nd Policeman	Episode 1: "Beginners"
1993	Soldier Soldier	RP Sergeant	1 episode
1993	Between the Lines	Mitchell	1 episode
1994	The All New Alexei Sayle Show		1 episode
1994	Pie in the Sky	D.S. Millard	1 episode
1994	Heartland	Robert Sutton	Miniseries, 7 episodes
1995	99-1	Hamley	1 episode
1995	Nelson's Column	Len	1 episode
1995	Moving Story	Detective Constable	1 episode
1995–2003	The Bill	Lee Rush / D.I. Joe Kemp / Tom Henderson / Robert Hayes / Mike Jarrow	5 episodes
1997	Lynda La Plante’s Supply & Demand, Raw Recruit	Michael Carter	TV movie
1997	Strange But True?	Reconstruction cast: Ski Rescue	Episode: "Littlecote House / Skiers on Bavarian Alps"
1997	Dream Team	Doug Hastings	1 episode
1997–1998	Trial & Retribution	P.C. Phelps	4 episodes
1998	Animated World Faiths	Nazi Guard 2	1 episode
2000	Without Motive	D.C. Mickey Lloyd	6 episodes
2002	London’s Burning	Dominic 'Dom' Mead	5 episodes
2002	Waking the Dead	D.S. Dougie Green	1 episode
2002	Rose and Maloney	Campbell	2 episodes
2002	Ultimate Force	Flint	1 episode
2002; 2006	EastEnders	Dave Roberts / Ray	10 episodes
2003–2005	William and Mary	Billy 'Two Hats'	Seasons 1–3, 14 episodes
2005	Rome	Lucius Septimus	2 episodes
2005	The Ghost Squad	PC Gary Lockhart	2 episodes
2006	Holby City	Peter Holland	1 episode
2006	Ancient Rome: The Rise and Fall of an Empire	Matho	Docudrama miniseries, 1 episode
2007	Forgiven	Prison Officer	TV movie
2007	Silent Witness	Mathew Harris	1 episode
2007–2010	Casualty	Robbie Sheraton / John Boylan	2 episodes
2009	Hustle	Rory	1 episode
2009	Ashes to Ashes	DCI Carnegie	1 episode
2009	U Be Dead	D.S. Malcolm Davies	TV movie
2010	Stanley Park	Rob	TV short
2010	Law & Order: UK	Don Marsh	1 episode
2011–2018	Hollyoaks	Dirk Savage	376 episodes
2012	Hatfields & McCoys	Bob Levinger	Miniseries, 2 episodes
2012	New Tricks	Rick Roddy	1 episode
2012	Call the Midwife	Mr Duncan	1 episode
2016	Marcella	Phil Maxwell	Season 1, 1 episode
2018	Vanity Fair	Mr Moss	1 episode
2019	Baptiste	Capsite Manager	1 episode
2020	White House Farm	Acting CS Mike Ainsley	Miniseries, 2 episodes
2020	Moving On	Rev Gary Andrews	1 episode
2020	Liar	Reporter Austin	1 episode
2020	Honour	DCS Phil Adams	Miniseries, 2 episodes
2024	Sexy Beast	Bert Dove	5 episodes

=== Video games ===
Year	Title	Role	Notes
2013	Crysis 3	Psycho	Video game
2017	Warhammer 40,000: Dawn of War III	Orks	Video game
