= Blessing Chambers =

Fictional character from Hollyoaks

- Hollyoaks character
- Portrayed by: Modupe Adeyeye
- First appearance: 21 February 2014
- Last appearance: 21 November 2014
- Created by: Jonathan Larkin
- Introduced by: Bryan Kirkwood
In-universe information
- Other names: Blessing Chamber; Tyson Delaney
- Occupation: Waitress; Barmaid
- Mother: Petula Delaney

Blessing Chambers is a fictional character from the British soap opera Hollyoaks, portrayed by Modupe Adeyeye. She made her first appearance on 21 February 2014, with the character and casting having been announced earlier that month. Adeyeye had to audition several times for the role and tried to enjoy the role as she was unsure if she would be successful. Hollyoaks producer Bryan Kirkwood was a fan of the actresses' work after seeing her in EastEnders: E20. Blessing was introduced as a glass collector at a strip club that ends up being fired when Dennis Savage (Joe Tracini) gets her into trouble. Blessing was characterised as not having had much luck in her past and thus she moves to Hollyoaks for a fresh start and new opportunities. Blessing was also characterised as being a colourful character and having a colourful dress style, which was different to Adeyeye's style. The actress teased that Blessing would be a big character and would bring happiness to the lives of Dennis and others.

Blessing was later revealed to be a transgender woman, which was used to explore the character's backstory. Hollyoaks scriptwriter Jonathan Larkin revealed that he had the original idea for the character after being inspired by a friend of his in addition to actress Laverne Cox's character in Orange Is the New Black and journalist Paris Lees. Larkin explained that the soap wanted to educate people through Blessing's storylines and to give viewers going through similar experiences as Blessing a storyline that they could relate to. Hollyoaks worked with organisations The Gender Trust and All About Trans throughout the storyline and held workshops with the latter. Blessing faces mixed responses when her transgender status is revealed, and Dennis initially breaks up with her as he feels that he was lied to, but they later reconcile.

Blessing's other storylines have included being attacked by Finn O'Connor (Keith Rice), trying to track down her parents and trying to help her friend Maxine Minniver (Nikki Sanderson) escape her abusive relationship. The character was used in both serious and comedy storylines. Blessing was also used to tackle the issue of self-harm, with the character cutting herself on a few occasions. Blessing was later written out of the soap opera and last appeared on 21 November 2014, departing alongside Dennis. Her exit storyline involved her being tracked down by Dennis and Trevor Royle (Greg Wood) after stealing the latter's diamonds. Blessing received positive reception from critics and she was seen as the most high profile transgender character in British television during her stint on the soap.

== Casting and creation ==
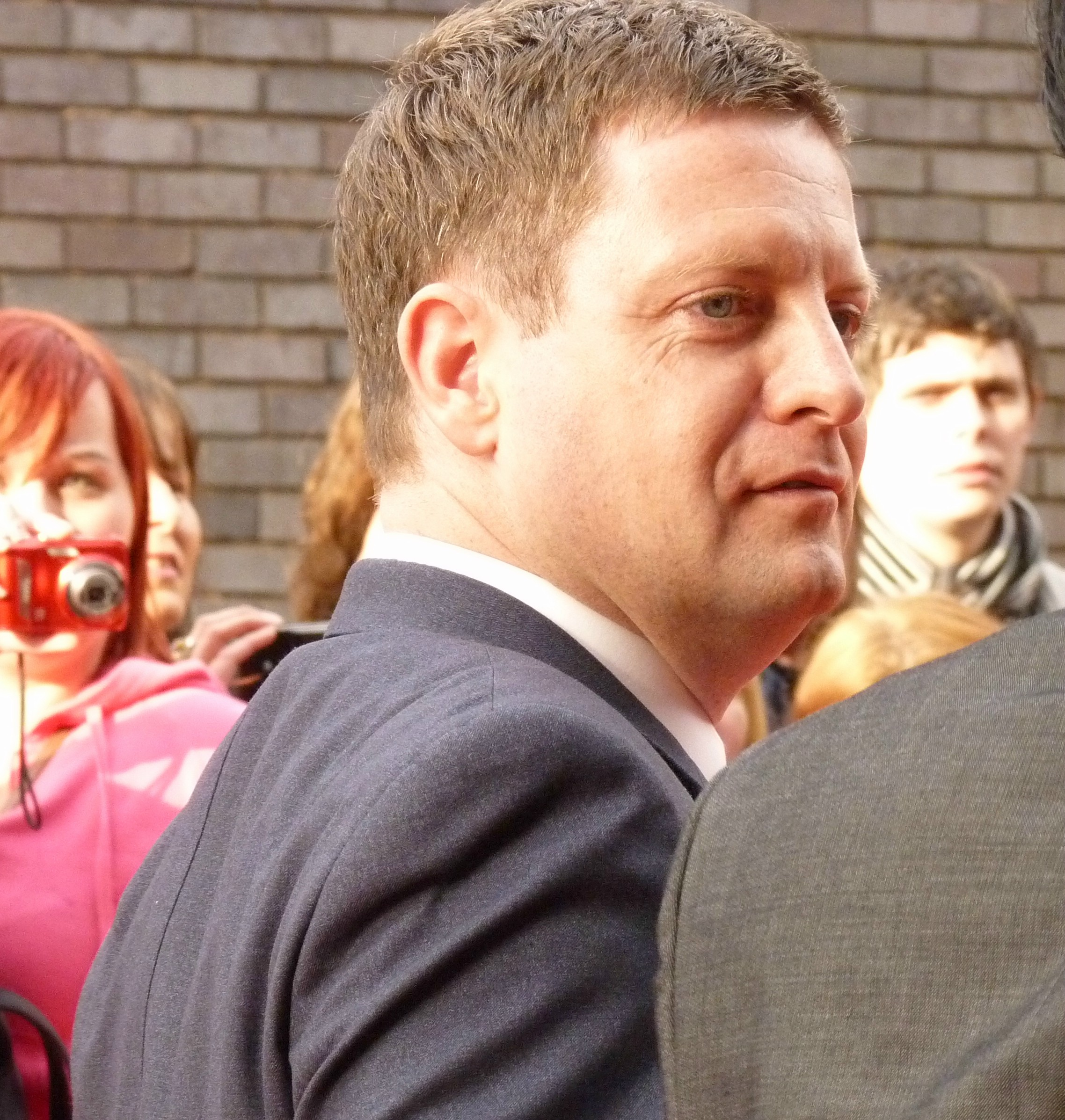
Executive producer Bryan Kirkwood (pictured) was a fan of Adeyeye after seeing her in EastEnders: E20.

In February 2014, it was announced that actress Modupe Adeyeye had joined Hollyoaks as new regular character, Blessing Chambers. The character's surname was also spelt "Chamber" in the announcement and on the Channel 4 website. Adeyeye had already begun filming at the time of the announcement and she made her first appearance as Blessing on 21 February 2014. Blessing was described as being "strong" and "colourful", but it was teased that viewers would soon find out that Blessing has not had "a lot of luck in the past". The Channel 4 website announcement for the character teased that she would have a "big" debut and would be bringing "some much needed fun" to the lives of other characters, including Dennis Savage (Joe Tracini).

Adeyeye felt "blessed" to receive the role and called joining the soap a "pleasure", calling the people there "lovely" and welcoming. The actress explained that she first heard about the audition "quite a while" prior to being cast and found the audition process interesting; in her first audition, she was required to perform a monologue, whilst she was given scripts to following in her following two auditions, which took place at Lime Pictures in Liverpool with other people auditioning. Adeyeye added, "It got to the point where I knew it was the final audition before somebody would get the part, which is always a bit nerve-wracking but you just have to do your best". The actress revealed that she was not sure whether she would win the role and thus tried to enjoy the auditions and try her best. After winning the role, Adeyeye felt more excited than nervous and called her first day "quite nice" and a good "ease-in", and praised the director for being lovely. The actress described Blessing as a "big character" and compared her to Marmite, explaining, "Some people will love her and some people will hate her, but she is genuinely a nice person. These days people are not blunt and nobody really says it how it is, but Blessing does! That can sometimes cause some tension." Blessing was billed as a "colourful" character and Adeyeye revealed that there were many "lovely" new outfits for her, and that she would never be seen in "dull colours" as she "doesn't bring anything but colour". The actress explained that her dress style is different to Blessing's as her favourite colour is black and she dresses more simple than Blessing.

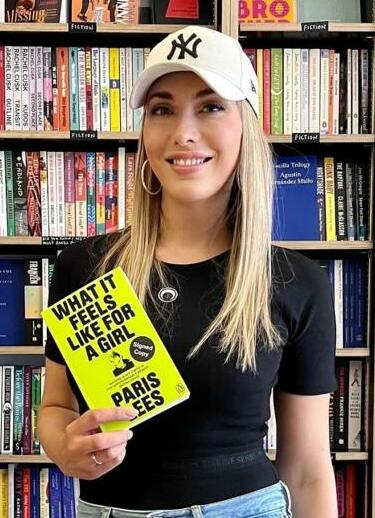
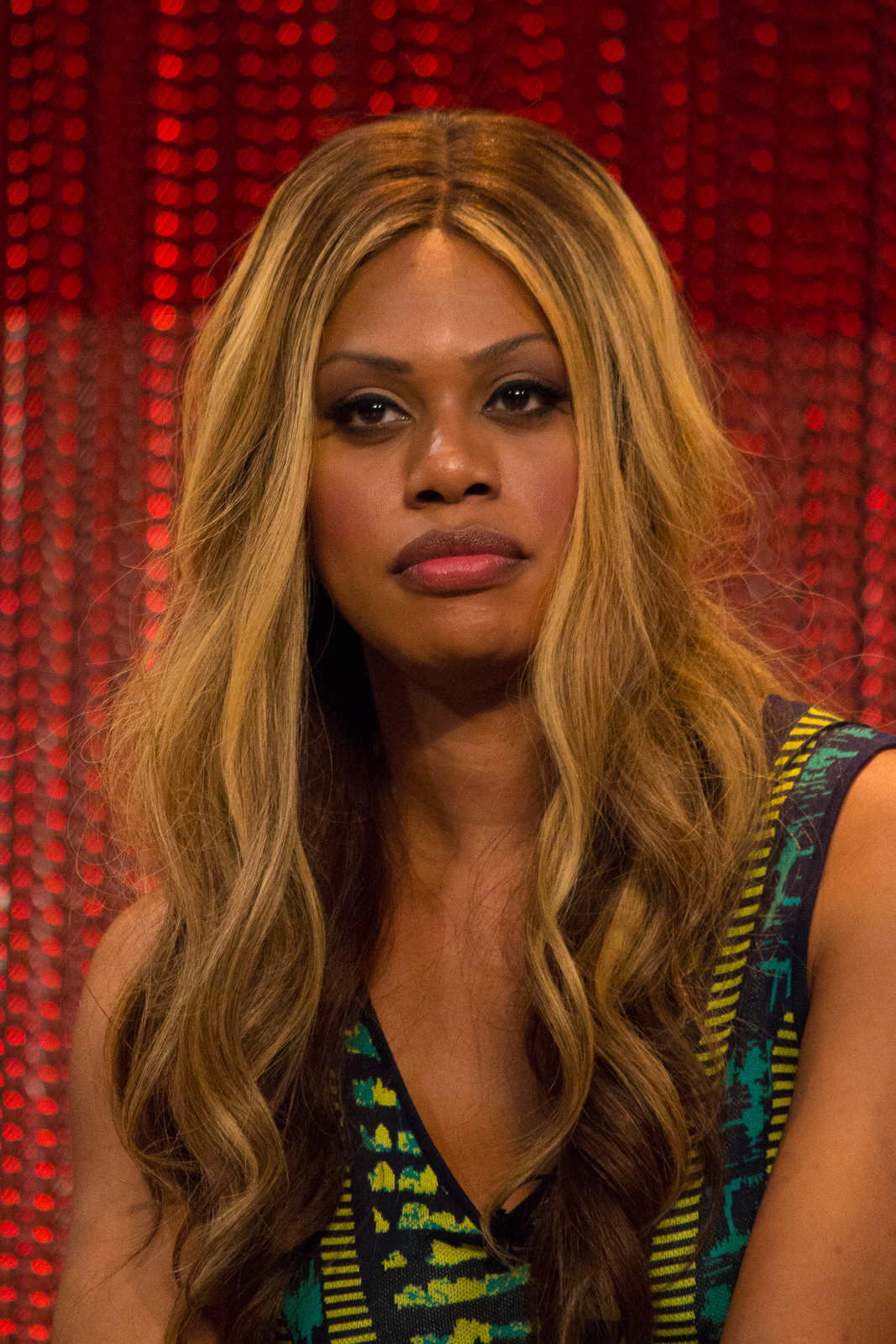
Paris Lees (right) and Laverne Cox (left) helped inspire the character's initial creation

Hollyoaks scriptwriter Jonathan Larkin explained that he worked with Adeyeye in workshops and believed that she was very natural in her approach and had great instinct. Larkin revealed that Hollyoaks producer Bryan Kirkwood was a fan of Adeyeye after seeing her in EastEnders: E20 and wanted to work with her again, with the role feeling "perfect" as she "can be larger than life but she can also bring vulnerability and heart, and that's what we wanted for Blessing". Adeyeye believed that her work on EastEnders and EastEnders: E20 helped her with her Hollyoaks role as she believed that all acting experience is training for the following acting job. Despite Blessing being a transgender woman, Adeyeye is not transgender herself, which Larked explained was "definitely something that was not taken lightly, but [Adeyeye is] an actress, and a good one, so I don't think she will disappoint". Larking had the original idea for the character and revealed that Blessing had been "buzzing" around his head for a while and that he felt a need to tell the story of a transgender woman arriving to the Hollyoaks village for a long time. Larkin considered the character to be his "brainchild", but admitted Blessing ended up being a "group effort" due to writers, storyliners and producers adding their inputs and further "layers that might not have been there in the first place" to characters. Discussing how he came up of the idea for the character, Larkin called the character an "amalgamation" of different people, explaining:

"My good friend Ngunan, who's a radio DJ, inspired the first incarnation, the funky smart girl with heart and attitude. Having watched Orange Is the New Black and seeing Laverne Cox's character Sophia, the similarities with the Blessing I wanted to write were shining through. The tough exterior, the warm nature, coming from a hard knock life but never forgetting to be a glamorous ray of sunshine... it all just fitted together perfectly. Having read up on Paris Lees and her backstory, the inspiration just kept on coming and it felt like it was finally Blessing's time to shine."

Adeyeye knew about Blessing's history when she accepted the role and was very excited to be part of the storyline, commenting, "It's challenging, but I think if life's not challenging, it's not really worth living. I love being under pressure and not knowing what's going to happen each day, because it makes me push myself". The actress did one-to-one sessions with All About Trans to prepare for the role and remained in contact with the organisation later on in her stint, which she found helpful.

== Development ==
=== Introduction and romance ===
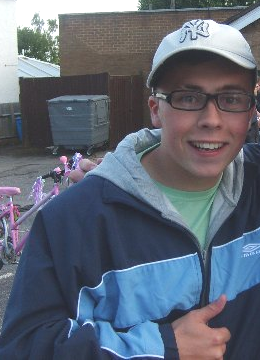
Joe Tracini portrays Dennis Savage, who begins a romance with a Blessing (pictured).

Blessing is first introduced as a glass collector at a strip club which established character Dennis Savage (Joe Tracini) visits in February 2014. Adeyeye explained that Blessing does not enjoy working there but she wants to make money, commenting, "Because of the type of character Blessing is, she makes everything work for her. Even if she doesn't want to do something, she'll try to make it work for her anyway". Blessing initially finds Dennis really annoying as he causing a lot of drama at the club and wonders who he is, with Adeyeye explaining, "This is a new job for Blessing and she really needs to keep it because she wants to start a new life and make money, but then there's this weird guy popping up everywhere! She feels like she needs a little mousetrap for him!" Dennis ends up getting Blessing in trouble with her boss, which puts Blessing's job and flat above the club – which is "currently all she has" – in jeopardy. Adeyeye believed that it was not Blessing's fault at all for getting fired and blamed Dennis, explaining that Blessing is trying to "keep everything under control" but it looks like she is causing trouble every time her boss sees her, and that Blessing is not happy with The customer is always right attitude as that is the "problem". The actress explained that Blessing comes to Hollyoaks for a fresh start and new opportunities due to not having had much luck in the past. Adeyeye also teased that Blessing could bring some happiness to Dennis' life and to other characters too. Adeyeye enjoyed working with Tracini, calling him the "best", lovely, caring and funny on and off screen. Dennis and Blessing later become a on-off romantic couple.

=== Transgender status ===
In April 2014, it was announced that a storyline would begin which would see Blessing as transgender. The storyline was also used to explore the character's "secret" backstory. Hollyoaks worked with organisations The Gender Trust and All About Trans in order to portray the storyline realistically and sensitively. The soap's writers had been influenced by transgender journalist and activist Paris Lees and by transgender actress Laverne Cox. Adeyeye found researching the character "really inspiring", adding that she hoped that Blessing's "story of a young trans woman who is loud and feisty and unapologetic proves to be a good role model. I hope that the people who need to be touched by her story will be." Hollyoaks had previously had another character, Jason Costello (Victoria Atkin), come out as transgender in 2010. However, it was explained that this storyline would be different, as it would focus more on Blessing's relationship with Dennis, and also because Blessing is further into her transition and has already started hormones.

"Ignorance is breeding hatred in the real world so if we can educate people at the same time as entertaining them I think that's really important. Also, whilst showing some of the hardships of somebody in Blessing's position, we'll show that you can overcome the odds. She's a hopeful, aspirational character."

— Hollyoaks scriptwriter Jonathan Larkin on Blessing's character (2014)

In an interview with Digital Spy, Hollyoaks scriptwriter Jonathan Larkin praised the workshop that soap held with All About Trans whilst researching the character, saying that whilst he already knew some transgender people, he thought it was great get new input from other trans people in the story and character. Larkin got to know more about the "focused, personal take" on what it is like to transition though having one-to-ones with the workshop participants, explaining, "Having that human face-to-face interaction is imperative when trying to write the character going through their day-to-day struggles". Speaking about the aims for the character, Larkin explained that the soap wanted to tell "good stories" with Blessing, and to give viewers who are going through similar experiences as Blessing a storyline that they can relate to. Larkin added that the soap also wanted to show viewers who do not any trans people that they do not have "two heads", adding that "Ignorance is bred from lack of visibility and lack of awareness. By the time people learn of Blessing's trans status, they'll have known her for a few months and will realise she's no different to the girl they've been enjoying on screen so far. They just know a bit more about her". Larkin disclosed that the Hollyoaks team felt that they had a big responsibility with Blessing being the "most high-profile trans character on UK TV" due to the departure of Hayley Cropper (Julie Hesmondhalgh), but that they were happy that they were passed the "trans torch" and wondered if other shows would begin to do the same, as he was shocked by the lack of transgender people on TV.

=== Coming out ===
Larkin teased that Blessing would get a mixed reaction from the village when they find out about her being trans, commenting that it would not be "a bed of roses" but also not complete "misery" either. Larkin believed that many of Blessing's issues are due to her always thinking the worst, self-loathing and worrying that people will cut her off and be horrible, which Larkin related to as he was like that when he came out as gay. Larkin explained that because of this, there would be "pleasant surprises" when people take Blessing to their hearts for who she is, but that it would not be easy due to there also being bigotry and ignorance, though Larkin believed that Blessing would overcome these due to being a "tough cookie". Larkin teased that Dennis would not understand straight away and would "react quite badly to start, which I think is a very human thing. He says the wrong thing, freaks out… It wouldn't be a story if he just accepted it. Nobody wants to watch a soap about people skipping along with no hurdles, no hiccups." Larkin called Dennis and Blessing's romance – like the others on the soap – a "rollercoaster" and questioned whether Dennis would do the right thing. The scriptwriter also teased that Blessing would be involved in other fun and dark storylines, and commented that it was great to put Blessing in other characters' storylines as "she's a bit of a firecracker, there's no telling what chaos she'll cause! Her heart's in the right place though".

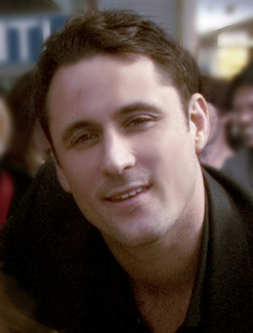
Blessing confides in Tony Hutchinson, portrayed by Nick Pickard (pictured).

The storyline sees Dennis and Blessing grow closer, with Blessing keen to take their relationship slowly. Dennis then "lays his heart on the line" after finding a testicular lump and, fearing the worst, needs support Blessing and his friends. As he knows he can rely on Blessing, he confides in her about the lump and later decides to "live life to the full" and tells Blessing that he would marry her immediately if he could. Blessing rejects Dennis after being freaked out by his "pushy attitude", but she later confides to Tony Hutchinson (Nick Pickard) that she is a transgender woman and she was originally named Tyson Delaney, and that she is hesitant as Dennis does not know. Blessing also reveals that she has a "troubled" background and spent time in a Young Offender Institution before moving to Hollyoaks for a new life as a woman. Explaining why Blessing confided to Tony, Adeyeye explained that Tony is "just there" when she is feeling so stressed and needs someone to release to. The actress added that Blessing would love to be honest with Dennis and will tell him the truth eventually, but added that Blessing is scared of losing him, adding, "I think it's just one of those things, if you really love someone and you really have a great bond with them, I think it's harder to tell them the truth than someone you don't care about". It is revealed to viewers that Blessing's parents, who are unaware of Blessing's transition and true identity, have hired a private investigator to track her down, which worries Blessing. Blessing pleads with Tony to keep her secret, who – wanting to be "matchmaker" – urges her to be honest with Dennis. Having bonded with Tony and buoyed with his support, Blessing initially tries to tell Dennis, but this does not happen as he decides to move out following her rejection due to his pride is "too dented". Blessing is able to stop Dennis from leaving by telling him that she does want to marry him at a later stage, but not immediately.

Blessing decides to tell Dennis about her past when he finds Missing person posters about "Tyson". Daniel Kilkelly from Digital Spy hinted that this would be a "big week" for blessing. When Blessing confides in Dennis that she is transgender, he is initially stunned and unhappy as he feels that Blessing has lied to him. Tracini added hat Dennis is also "obviously shocked" when Blessing eventually confesses to him due to a lot of stuff having happened in the lead up to the reveal, and that "all of the things [Dennis] could have gone through in his head, this just doesn't enter into it." Tracini himself was unsure of how he would react if he was in that situation, saying, "I hope that in human beings just as a thing is that if you fall in love with the person, it doesn't matter about anything else because you love them and not anything else". Adeyeye explained that "Dennis is shocked, as any other man would be. He's not used to hearing something like that. He met Blessing as Blessing and he didn't know that she used to be Tyson Delaney". However, the actress did not believe that that would be the end of their relationship as she believed that they are "better" and "stronger" than that. Tracini teased that the couple would try to deal with the revelation, as this is not something that they have gone through on that level. He added, "It's just watching them struggle with finding a balance between both of their personalities and what they're both going through and at the same time trying to stay together through it because they love each other".

Despite Blessing's revelation having caused Dennis to be "hurt" by her "lies", the couple put their tension and problems aside to focus on Blessing's election campaign, as she is running against Tegan Lomax (Jessica Ellis) to be president of their Student Union. Blessing is then "delighted" when she receives a letter from the hospital about her surgery, with Tony promising to be "by her side" when she undergoes the operation. Blessing is then "touched" when she realises that Dennis has written her speech for her at the election, and she tells Dennis that she cannot be "just friends" with him and gives him an ultimatum that it is "all or nothing". The following month, Dennis faces a "race against time" when he tries to stop Blessing from leaving the village, as Blessing has left him a note explaining her departure without any details of where she is going. Dennis finds out that Blessing has left to attempt to reconcile with her parents, so he borrows a bike from a schoolgirl and chases after Blessing and begs her to come home. Larkin had teased earlier that year that they had written Blessing's mother.

=== Attack ===
Writers also created conflict between Blessing and Finn O'Connor (Keith Rice). This occurs when Blessing and Dennis, with their relationship on "rocky ground", sign up for Speed dating event to make each other jealous. The "unlikely pair" of Finn and Blessing are matched at the event and Finn is happy to be matched with Blessing, but his sister, Sinead O'Connor (Stephanie Davis), who wants revenge against her family, deliberately causes trouble between the matched pair by tampering with Blessing's comment card. Believing that Blessing has called him a freak, Finn shows his "nasty side" by calling Blessing a "skank" and shoving the card down her top. It becomes clear that Finn has not dropped the matter and he later attacks Blessing when he discovers that she is transgender. Scriptwriter Larkin had previously teased that Blessing's future storylines would involve violence.

=== Further issues and exit ===
Blessing also plays a role in the domestic abuse storyline of Maxine Minniver (Nikki Sanderson). In the storyline, Blessing and Dennis help their friend Maxine travel to the airport to escape her abusive fiancé Patrick Blake (Jeremy Sheffield) on the eve of their wedding. Maxine shares an "emotional goodbye" with Blessing at the airport, but the "unmissable episodes" result in Maxine eventually not leaving. Blessing was then used to tackle the issue of self-harm, which scriptwriter Larkin had previously told Digital Spy earlier in 2014. Ahead of her operation, Blessing tries to track down her parents, but she cuts herself after this leads to "disappointment". Blessing covers her wounds when she meets with her consultant regarding the surgery and she is delighted when Dennis throws her a party to celebrate. However, at the party Dennis notices Blessing's unusual behaviour and she later collapses.

Blessing's exit from the soap tied in with Dennis' exit, with Tracini having announced his intention to leave Hollyoaks earlier that year. In the storyline, which aired in November 2014, Dennis goes on a "desperate mission" to find Blessing, who has recently left the village. Blessing is also being looked for by Trevor Royle (Greg Wood), as he wants his diamonds that Blessing took from him; he and Dennis team up to search for her, but they have "very different" motives for finding her. When Blessing and Dennis eventually come face-to-face they remain on "rocky ground" until Dennis decides whether they have a future or not. After confronting her about her drug arrest, Blessing and Dennis then leave the village.

== Storylines ==
Blessing meets Dennis Savage (Joe Tracini) when he and his friends visit the strip club that she works in as a glass collector. They end up arguing and Blessing's behaviour gets her fired. As an apology, Dennis gives her a place to stay. Dennis becomes attracted to Blessing and the pair become close, but problems arise due to his continued distrust of her. When Blessing ruins George Smith's (Steven Roberts) laptop, he steals her credit card to buy a new one, which attracts a private investigator. The private investigator threatens and blackmails Blessing in exchange for her silence. Dennis and Blessing begin a relationship, but Dennis finds a testicular lump and, assuming the worst, asks Blessing to marry him. Blessing rejects him and confides in Tony Hutchinson (Nick Pickard) that she is a transgender woman and that she rejected Dennis as he does not know. She also reveals that she spent time in a Young Offender Institution. Tony encourages Blessing to be honest with Dennis, who is moving out due to the rejection. Blessing is able to stop him from leaving by telling him that she does want to marry him but not yet. It is also revealed that Blessing's parents do not know that she is transgender and are trying to track Blessing down, which is why Blessing was investigated for using the credit card.

Blessing eventually tells Dennis the truth. Dennis does not react well at first as he feels that he was lied to. Blessing hides from her mother, Petula Delaney, when she comes looking for her "son" as she is worried about the rejection. Blessing goes to a Speed dating event and is matched with Finn O'Connor (Keith Rice). Finn is rude to Blessing when he believes that she has insulted him. She later gets drunk and kisses Finn, but he attacks her when he realises that she has male genitals. Tony believes that Dennis is the attacker but finds out that is Finn when he finds the video that he recorded of the attack. Tony tries to report Finn for the attack but Diane O'Connor (Alex Fletcher) destroys the evidence. Dennis supports Blessing when she runs for Student Union president against Tegan Lomax (Jessica Ellis). Blessing then tells Dennis that she cannot be just friends with him and they begin dating again. Dennis holds a fundraiser to raise money for Blessing's upcoming operation. Blessing faces transphobic remarks from Frankie Osborne (Helen Pearson). Blessing later self-harms when her attempts to track down her parents lead to disappointment. Blessing and Dennis also try to help their friend Maxine Minniver (Nikki Sanderson) escape her abusive relationship with Patrick Blake (Jeremy Sheffield). Blessing steals Trevor Royle (Greg Wood)'s diamonds and leaves the village, so Trevor and Dennis team up to find her. Dennis eventually finds her and Dennis also leave the villages to be with her. Years later, Dennis reveals that he and Blessing have broken up.

== Reception ==
When reporting on the character's announcement, a writer from the Channel 4 website was thankful that Blessing would be bringing some "much needed fun" to the lives of Dennis and other characters, writing, "Yay!" Following the announcement of Blessing coming out as transgender, Daniel Kilkelly from Digital Spy speculated that Blessing would become the "most high-profile trans character" in UK television. Kilkelly later called Blessing's revelation to Dennis "brave". Kilkelly's colleague, Sophie Dainty, called Blessing a "a cause for concern" following her "fresh bout" of self-harm. Transgender journalist Paris Lees wrote in an article that Blessing had been "brightening up Hollyoaks" and also called Blessing "most high profile trans character on British television". Lees wrote that Blessing's story of spending time in a male juvenile detention centre making her realise that she wanted to live life as a woman upon release was a story that Lees "know[s] well". Lees also "made no secret of the fact" that she believes that trans actors play trans roles better. In 2018, Laura Morgan from Digital Spy wrote that Dennis' luck changed when he met Blessing. The following year, Entertainment Daily reported how fans were speculating on the Digital Spy forum that Blessing would return and be revealed as the secret twin of Mitchell Deveraux (Imran Adams).
