= Modupe Adeyeye =

English actress

- Born: 29 July 1992 (age 34); London, England
- Occupations: Actress; model
- Years active: 2011–present
- Television: EastEnders; EastEnders: E20; Hollyoaks

Modupe Adeyeye (born 29 July 1992) is an English actress and model, known for her roles as Faith Olubunmi in EastEnders and EastEnders: E20 and Blessing Chambers in Hollyoaks.

== Early life and career ==
Born and raised in London, her name "Modupe" means "I praise or thank God" in Yoruba. She has appeared in the drama series Our Girl and My Murder, as well as Doctors. in 2012, she appeared in the music video for single Amazing by Matt Cardle. She later appeared in the 2014 film Honeytrap, alongside former E20 co-star Tosin Cole.

On 21 February 2014, Adeyeye joined the cast of Hollyoaks as Blessing Chambers, and her character was later revealed to be transgender. Blessing began a relationship with Dennis Savage (Joe Tracini), and later found herself competing with Dennis' deceased wife Leanne Holiday (Jessica Forrest), being brutally attacked by evil rapist Finn O'Connor (Keith Rice) and she began self-harming when her family disowned her for being transgender. Her last appearance aired on 21 November 2014. In 2020, Adeyeye was set to appear in the BBC television film Surge as Mischa.
