= I'm a Celebrity...Get Me Out of Here! (British TV series) series 11 =

I'm a Celebrity...Get Me Out of Here!
- Series 11
- Presented by: Anthony McPartlin; Declan Donnelly
- No. of days: 21
- No. of castaways: 13
- Winner: Dougie Poynter
- Runner-up: Mark Wright
- Companion show: I'm a Celebrity...Get Me Out of Here! NOW!
- No. of episodes: 19

Release
- Original network: ITV
- Original release: 13 November – 3 December 2011

Series chronology
- ← Previous; Series 10 Next → Series 12

I'm a Celebrity...Get Me Out of Here! returned for its eleventh series on 13 November 2011, where Ant & Dec were back as presenters. On its spin off show, Get Me Out of Here NOW!, Laura Whitmore, Russell Kane and Joe Swash were new presenters.

On 3 December 2011, Dougie Poynter was crowned the new King of the Jungle. Ant & Dec announced on the Coming Out show that I'm a Celebrity... would return for a 12th series in 2012.

Fatima Whitbread would return to the series 11 years later to participate in I'm a Celebrity... South Africa alongside other former contestants to try to become the first I'm a Celebrity legend. Whitbread finished third once again, losing out to series 6 contestant Myleene Klass and series 16 contestant Jordan Banjo.

Sinitta would return to the series fifteen years later to compete in the second series of I'm a Celebrity... South Africa to try become the second I'm a Celebrity legend. Sinitta would finish in 6th place.

== Celebrities ==
The official line-up was confirmed on 8 November 2011. The day before the show started, it was reported that Freddie Starr had not entered the jungle with the other celebrities. On Day 3, TV presenter Pat Sharp and singer Sinitta were confirmed to be entering the jungle. Model and DJ Emily Scott entered the jungle on Day 5.

On 20 November 2011, Neighbours actor Ian Smith joined the jungle to set the camp mates on a series of challenges called "Beat the Bugs" over three days.

On 10 November 2011, it was confirmed by ITV that Peter Andre would be returning to camp for one day to set the remaining camp mates tasks to win treats.

Celebrity	Known for	Status
Dougie Poynter	McFly bassist	Winner on 3 December 2011
Mark Wright	The Only Way Is Essex star	Runner-up on 3 December 2011
Fatima Whitbread	Retired javelin thrower	Eliminated 10th on 2 December 2011
Antony Cotton	Coronation Street actor	Eliminated 9th on 2 December 2011
Willie Carson	Retired horse jockey	Eliminated 8th on 1 December 2011
Crissy Rock	Benidorm actress	Eliminated 7th on 30 November 2011
Emily Scott	Model	Eliminated 6th on 29 November 2011
Jessica-Jane Clement	Actress	Eliminated 5th on 28 November 2011
Lorraine Chase	Former Emmerdale actress	Eliminated 4th on 27 November 2011
Pat Sharp	Television and radio presenter	Eliminated 3rd on 26 November 2011
Sinitta	Singer	Eliminated 2nd on 25 November 2011
Stefanie Powers	Stage and screen actress	Eliminated 1st on 24 November 2011
Freddie Starr	Comedian	Withdrew on 15 November 2011

== Results and elimination ==
Indicates that the celebrity was immune from the vote
Indicates that the celebrity received the most votes from the public
Indicates that the celebrity received the fewest votes and was eliminated immediately (no bottom two)
Indicates that the celebrity was named as being in the bottom two
Indicates that the celebrity received the second fewest votes and were not named in the bottom two

Daily results per celebrity
	Day 12	Day 13	Day 14	Day 15	Day 16	Day 17	Day 18	Day 19	Day 20		Day 21 Final	Trials	Celebrity Chest challenges
	Day 12	Day 13	Day 14	Day 15	Day 16	Day 17	Day 18	Day 19	Round 1	Round 2	Day 21 Final	Trials	Celebrity Chest challenges
Dougie	Immune	3rd 14.96%	3rd 12.90%	4th 12.85%	4th 12.71%	3rd 17.51%	1st 25.81%	4th 18.21%	1st 32.68%	2nd 35.46%	Winner; 55.07%	5	1
Mark	Immune	2nd 21.10%	2nd 19.20%	2nd 19.69%	1st 20.91%	2nd 18.51%	3rd 19.75%	1st 33.60%	2nd 26.68%	1st 38.45%	Runner-up; 44.93%	6	4
Fatima	3rd 9.08%	8th 4.32%	9th 4.68%	1st 26.92%	3rd 18.16%	6th 11.47%	4th 19.49%	3rd 20.02%	3rd 21.46%	3rd 26.09%	Eliminated (Day 20)	5	1
Antony	1st 48.25%	1st 24.58%	1st 23.39%	3rd 17.27%	2nd 20.38%	1st 18.93%	2nd 21.09%	2nd 20.69%	4th 19.18%	Eliminated (Day 20)		4	2
Willie	2nd 23.69%	4th 7.76%	6th 6.81%	6th 5.83%	7th 6.39%	4th 12.93%	5th 7.62%	5th 7.48%	Eliminated (Day 19)			2	1
Crissy	Immune	7th 4.98%	4th 9.09%	5th 6.33%	6th 7.04%	5th 12.21%	6th 6.24%	Eliminated (Day 18)				2	2
Emily	Immune	5th 5.93%	7th 5.00%	8th 3.78%	5th 8.77%	7th 8.43%	Eliminated (Day 17)					1	3
Jessica-Jane	Immune	6th 5.57%	5th 7.88%	7th 5.02%	8th 5.64%	Eliminated (Day 16)						2	3
Lorraine	5th 7.52%	10th 4.14%	8th 4.76%	9th 2.30%	Eliminated (Day 15)							1	0
Pat	Immune	9th 4.28%	10th 3.30%	Eliminated (Day 14)								3	1
Sinitta	4th 8.05%	11th 2.38%	Eliminated (Day 13)									3	0
Stefanie	6th 3.13%	Eliminated (Day 12)										2	0
Freddie	Withdrew (Day 3)											2	0
Notes	1	None	2	None							3		
Bottom two (named in)	Lorraine, Stefanie	Crissy, Sinitta	Fatima, Pat	Emily, Lorraine	Jessica-Jane, Willie	Emily, Fatima	Crissy, Mark	Dougie, Willie	None				
Eliminated	Stefanie; 3.13% to save	Sinitta; 2.38% to save	Pat; Lost trial	Lorraine; 2.30% to save	Jessica-Jane; 5.64% to save	Emily; 8.43% to save	Crissy; 6.24% to save	Willie; 7.48% to save	Antony; 19.18% to save	Fatima; 26.09% to win	Mark; 44.93% to win		
Eliminated	Stefanie; 3.13% to save	Sinitta; 2.38% to save	Pat; Lost trial	Lorraine; 2.30% to save	Jessica-Jane; 5.64% to save	Emily; 8.43% to save	Crissy; 6.24% to save	Willie; 7.48% to save	Antony; 19.18% to save	Fatima; 26.09% to win	Dougie; 55.07% to win		

=== Notes ===
N.B. Bottom two is not a strict indication of the public vote as the celebrities are revealed in "no particular order".
^1 In order to win immunity from the first public vote, all the celebrities took part in a task called "Beat the Bugs". The losing team from each round would then go to the Sin Bin (located in camp), all the celebrities then had to face a "Bed Bugs" challenge and the team which lost would face the first public vote.
^2 All of the celebrities faced the public vote; the bottom two were revealed as Fatima and Pat. The other celebrities were declared safe and on Day 14 both Fatima and Pat faced a bush tucker trial called "Fill Your Face: Extreme". Fatima won the trial and returned to camp, while Pat was sent home.
^3 The public were voting for who they wanted to win instead of who they wanted to save.

== Bushtucker trials ==
The contestants take part in daily trials to earn food

The public vote for who they want to face the trial
The contestants decide who does which trial
The trial is compulsory and neither the public nor celebrities decide who take part

Trial number	Air Date	Name of trial	Celebrity participation	Winner/Number of Stars	Notes
1	13 November	Scales of Justice	Antony; Crissy; Dougie; Fatima; Freddie; Jessica-Jane; Lorraine; Mark; Stefanie; Willie	Antony; Crissy; Fatima; Lorraine; Mark	1
2	14 November	The Greasy Spoon	Mark; Freddie	Freddie	None
3	16 November	Creepy Crypt	Mark; Stefanie	Mark	2
4	17 November	Rat Run	Dougie; Fatima	Fatima	3
5	18 November	Cable Car-tastrophe	Sinitta	3/11 stars	4
6	19 November	Crude Awakenings	Antony	8/12 stars	5,6
7	20 November	Hell-evator	Sinitta	2/12 stars	None
8 (Live)	20 November	Horrods	Sinitta	5/12 stars	None
9	22 November	Head Trip	Pat	11/12 stars	None
10	24 November	Bushman's Bungalow	Pat	8/12 stars	None
11	25 November	Coral Grief	Emily	11/11 stars	None
12	26 November	Fair Dunk 'Um	Jessica-Jane	6/10 stars	None
13	27 November	Fill Your Face Extreme	Fatima; Pat	Fatima	7
14	28 November	Pits of Peril	Mark	8/8 stars	None
15	29 November	Mystery Box	Crissy; Willie	5/7 stars	None
16	30 November	Race Around the Clock	Dougie	6/6 stars	None
17	1 December	Splash and Grab	Antony; Fatima	2/5 stars	None
18	2 December	Celebrity Cyclone	Antony; Dougie; Fatima; Mark	4/4 stars	None
19	3 December	The Final Party	Dougie; Mark	4/4 stars	None

=== Notes ===
^1 The celebrities were split up into two teams, based on how they travelled into the jungle. The winning team would stay in "Croc Creek", the more luxurious of the two camps in the jungle. The losing team would move into the "Snake Rock" camp.
^2 Freddie was excluded from this trial on medical grounds.
^3 As they had yet to join one of the camps, Pat and Sinitta were both ineligible for this trial.
^4 As Emily arrived in the jungle after Sinitta had completed her trial, the celebrities were awarded an extra star to help feed an extra body
^5 As a new campmate, Emily was ineligible for this trial.
^6 Sinitta was excluded from this trial on medical grounds.
^7 This trial decided who left camp. The winner (Fatima) returned to camp while the loser (Pat) left the jungle.

== Star count ==
Celebrity	Number of Stars Earned	Percentage
Antony Cotton	14/21 stars	67%
Crissy Rock	5/7 stars	71%
Dougie Poynter	14/14 stars	100%
Emily Scott	11/11 stars	100%
Fatima Whitbread	6/9 stars	67%
Freddie Starr	—N/a	—N/a
Jessica-Jane Clement	6/10 stars	60%
Lorraine Chase	—N/a	—N/a
Mark Wright	16/16 stars	100%
Pat Sharp	19/24 stars	79%
Sinitta	10/35 stars	29%
Stefanie Powers	—N/a	—N/a
Willie Carson	5/7 stars	71%

== Celebrity Chest challenges ==
The celebrities got the question correct
The celebrities got the question wrong

Bold type means that contestant won the challenge (episodes 2 to 4)

Episode	Celebrities	Prize
2	**Jessica-Jane**; Antony	Crackers & cheese
3	**Willie**; Crissy	Crisps
4	Jessica-Jane; **Mark**	Mankini thong
5	Crissy; Antony	Popcorn
12	Pat; Fatima	Jam tarts
13	Mark; Emily	Cucumber sandwiches
14	Jessica-Jane; Emily	Water pistols
15	Mark; Emily	Dustpan and brush
17	Mark; Dougie	Pictures of Antony

== The camps ==
For the first four days of the show, the celebrities were split between two separate camps known as "Croc Creek" and "Snake Rock". The result of the first Bushtucker Trial determined which pre-determined team got to stay in Croc Creek - a larger and slightly more luxurious camp. The original members of each camp were:

Croc Creek: Antony, Crissy, Fatima, Lorraine and Mark.
Snake Rock: Dougie, Freddie, Jessica-Jane, Stefanie and Willie.

After their arrival in the jungle, Pat was sent to join Croc Creek, while Sinitta joined Snake Rock. The two camps merged in the early hours of Day 5, with the residents of Snake Rock relocating to the larger Croc Creek camp.

Emily joined the larger Croc Creek camp on Day 5.

== Episodes ==
=== Week 1 ===
No.	Title	Original release date	Duration
1	"Episode 1"	13 November 2011	90 minutes
It's the start of the new series. After a nice relaxing lunch and greeting session, Ant & Dec turned up at the contestants' hotel. After briefing them, they flew off to an overnight camp where they stayed the night. After that night, the contestants were split up into two groups, one that gets to the camp by canoe and one that gets there by parachute jump. However, when they arrive a Bushtucker trial and a new face awaits them. To face the trial they stay in their two groups (which become the two camps). The trial involves collecting stars from a variety of nasty things with only the mouth. The winning group, which included Lorraine, Mark, Fatima, Antony and Crissy, went to the luxury Croc Creek camp. Meanwhile the losing team, consisting of Stefanie, Willie, Jessica-Jane, Freddie and Dougie ended up in the Snake Rock camp. At the end of the programme, it was announced that competing in the next Bushtucker Trial for food would be Mark for Croc Creek and Freddie for Snake Rock.
2	"Episode 2"	14 November 2011	60 minutes
In the second episode, celebrities are starting to adjust to jungle life, but surprises are always around the corner. Mark for Croc Creek and Freddie for Snake Rock face the latest bushtucker trial "The Greasy Spoon" in which they must eat all kind of jungle "treats". Freddie won the trial for Snake Rock; therefore they got the luxury food package that evening, Freddie gained 5 stars compared to Mark's 3. Therefore, Croc Creek were left with rice and beans. Plus, Jessica-Jane and Antony went head to head in this series' first celebrity chest, which included squeezing an egg through a plastic snake. Jessica-Jane won the task and Snake Rock managed to get the question right for cheese and crackers. At the end, it was announced taking part in the next bushtucker trial, entitled Creepy Crypt, would be Mark for Croc Creek and Stefanie for Snake Rock. Note: Freddie exited the jungle in this episode to go to hospital with an unknown allergic reaction, due to one of the foods in the trial. Some celebrities, including Fatima, were very shocked by the news. That meant that Freddie was immune from the vote for "Creepy Crypt".
3	"Episode 3"	16 November 2011	90 minutes
In this episode, we see Mark and Stefanie compete for food in the "Creepy Crypt". Mark won the trial over Stefanie, gaining 5 stars over her 4; therefore Croc Creek ate well but Snake Rock were left with rice and beans. Also Crissy and Willie went head to head in the next celebrity chest, flinging toy koalas into a basket in the trees. Willie won for Snake Rock, they got the question right and won crisps. Also Fatima fell out with Mark and Stefanie after an innocent game of "family jungle". Two new celebrities, Sinitta and Pat Sharp, entered the jungle. To enter the jungle, they had to walk on a high wire and sleep the night in a dark cave. They managed both these actions and won the campmates their luxury items. It was announced that Freddie Starr after a two-day break will leave the jungle after a two-day break, having suffered an allergic reaction after the "Greasy Spoon" trial. At the end of the episode it was announced that the public vote for the trial "Rat Run" meant that Dougie was competing for Snake Rock and Fatima for Croc Creek.
4	"Episode 4"	17 November 2011	60 minutes
This episode saw Fatima and Dougie go head to head in Rat Run - a separated maze in which they both had to crawl through to retrieve stars from underground boxes. Fatima took the victory by only a slight, and so won food for Croc Creek. Meanwhile, Mark and Jessica-Jane competed for today's celebrity chest which made them fill their trousers with water and transport it to a funnel to get the key. Mark won the challenge for Croc Creek, but they incorrectly guessed the question and got the booby prize of a mankini, which Mark decided to model for his fellow campmates. Sinitta and Pat each joined the two separate camps: Sinitta in Snake Rock, and Pat in Croc Creek. A little twist in events occurred the next day, in which Snake Rock and Croc Creek were both informed that they were soon to merge as one camp, which meant Snake Rock had to leave their camp behind, much to their dismay. Despite this, they all came together in Croc Creek. At the end of the episode, Ant and Dec announced that Sinitta would be enduring the next bushtucker trial, entitled Cable Car-tastrophe.
5	"Episode 5"	18 November 2011	60 minutes
In episode 5, we witnessed Sinitta complete Cable Cart-astrophe, winning only 4 stars out of a possible 11, due to her phobia of bugs. Although, when she got back to camp, all her campmates were supportive and were empathetic towards Sinitta. Meanwhile, the cracks started to show between Antony, Stefanie, Willie and Fatima, and Crissy and Antony headed deep into the forest to find the celebrity chest, in which they had to use a map to dig up some clues to find the combination of the lock. They got the question right when they brought it back into camp, and therefore won popcorn to share between them. In the evening, model and DJ Emily Scott entered the jungle. Jessica-Jane was especially happy about this, as she was the youngest girl and now had a "playmate". Another campmate who seemed keen on Emily was Mark, and Dougie described him as a "huge flirt". At the end of the episode, Ant and Dec announced that the campmate facing the next trial (named Crude Awakening) was Antony. Sinitta had been excluded from this trial on medical grounds.
6	"Episode 6"	19 November 2011	60 minutes
The latest action from the jungle. Antony faced the latest bushtucker trial, "Crude Awakening", in which he had to crawl through a dimly-lit tunnel and collect stars along the way, pushing the likes of rats and toads aside. Antony finished with 8 stars out of 12, despite losing one at the end of the trial. Instead of a celebrity chest in this episode, there was a small game show and a pub visit. On a TV hauled into the jungle, Phillip Schofield presented a small game show named "Spill the Beans", in which the campmates had to answer a question based on one of their loved ones' choices. If they got it right, they would be allowed to go to The Jungle Arms pub. If not, they had to stay behind. Unfortunately, only Mark got his question wrong, so was all alone while the others enjoyed a drink and karaoke session that night. In the morning, Ant and Dec headed down to camp to announce that taking part in the next bushtucker trial named "Hellevator" would be Sinitta. It was also announced at the end of the episode that tomorrow a live trial would take place, called "Horrods".

=== Week 2 ===
No.	Title	Original release date	Duration
7	"Episode 7"	20 November 2011	90 minutes
Ant & Dec provide the latest gossip from the jungle. Sinitta faced the bushtucker trial "Hell-evator", in which she was in a metal cage lowered underground in water, and she had to rummage around in compartments to find stars: unfortunately, Sinitta only managed to obtain 2 stars out of 12. It was then announced that the campmates were going to form two teams: one Orange, one Blue. The team captains were Pat (Blue) and Stefanie (Orange), and the teams were as follows: on the Orange team were Stefanie, Willie, Sinitta, Lorraine, Fatima and Antony - and so on the Blue team were Pat, Mark, Jessica-Jane, Emily, Dougie and Crissy. The teams entered a forest clearing, only to find a game show set-up before them. Ian Smith, best known as Harold Bishop in Australian soap Neighbours, appeared as the game show host. He announced that over a three-day period, the teams would battle it out against each other in an attempt to win immunity from the first public elimination. The first challenge was a dart-related game. Stefanie chose Willie and Antony to take part, whereas Pat chose himself and Dougie. Pat and Antony had to stand behind a podium, rigged to an electric buzzer, and Dougie and Willie had to stand in a box of cockroaches and aim a dart at a particular genre of question. If Antony or Pat got a question right, the other person would be shocked. If they got a question wrong, they would be shocked themselves. The Blue team won as Antony answered one question incorrectly, so the Orange team had to spend the night in a "sin bin", sheltered away from the outside. For winning the first game, the Blue team won hot chocolate, marshmallows and chocolate brownies. At the end of the episode, Sinitta took part in the live trial, entitled 'Horrod's', and won 5 stars out of 12, with her campmates cheering her on in the sidelines. She had to go round all the departments of a shop set-up and complete various challenges, including removing a star from around a snake's body and opening "a present of hell" in Santa's Grotto.
8	"Episode 8"	21 November 2011	60 minutes
Ant and Dec present the latest news from the jungle. After Sinitta's live trial, we see the celebrities response to how she did and if they thought she could have done better. Sinitta described the trial as "well done" and was pleased she overcome her fear of snakes. Sinitta had achieved 5 stars out of a possible 12. Today, the camp faced the second immunity task. This time the Orange and Blue team had to remember a series of objects as they came up a conveyer belt, as they had all manner of jungle creatures were brought down on them. The Blue team (of which Mark and Jessica-Jane competed) won over the Orange team (of which Stefanie and Lorraine competed) by 16 objects to 12. This meant that the Orange team were back in the "Sin Bin". However, during the night tension grew between Pat and Lorraine when Pat embarked on a dark stand-up routine criticizing her for having a teddy bear, which she named "Tedward". Lorraine was furious over Pat's comments. It was announced by Ant and Dec at the end of the show that the public had decided facing the next bushtucker trial, named "Head Trip" would be Pat.
9	"Episode 9"	22 November 2011	60 minutes
Ant and Dec provide the latest action from the jungle. Pat faces the latest bushtucker trial "Head Trip", which involves collecting stars with his mouth through various chambers filled with jungle creatures, Pat managed to gain 11 out of 12 stars which was very much to the pleasure of his camp when he returned, although Antony still described him as a "berk" for yesterday's Tedward antics. Pat said that he had deliberately been mean last night to gain the votes to do this bushtucker trial, but some of the other campmates were unsure if that was the truth. It was also time for the final immunity challenge, in which one of the celebrities must collect insects such as cockroaches into a tray, whilst the other holds the tray. The Orange Team (of which Sinitta and Fatima competed) beat the Blue team (of which Crissy and Emily competed) so the Blue team ended up in the "sin bin" for the night. Mark ended up comforting Crissy after she felt that the team were leaving her out. Antony and Fatima also had a disagreement after she said that he should be happier. For the final time the public voted and decided that Pat would be facing the next bushtucker trail 'Bushman's Bungalow'.
10	"Episode 10"	24 November 2011	90 minutes
The episode starts with Pat's bushtucker trial, Bushman's Bungalow. In this trial, Pat had 2 minutes per room to search the different rooms of the bungalow set-up, to find and retrieve stars in various house items. He found this trial extremely hard, compared to his previous trial, given the time given to search the rooms, and found the kitchen to be the worst room, as there were fish guts and heads, and pig heads in the fridge. Despite this, he managed to find 8 stars out of 12. That night, both the Orange and Blue teams were sent off to separate camps, which held six beds each, with a glass box over the top. People on the opposite team had to decide which bugs to place into which bed of the other campmates, and most of the campmates were horrified by the choices. For the Blue team, Mark had rats, Dougie had crickets, Crissy had cockroaches, Emily had soldier crabs, Pat had yabbies and Jessica-Jane had snakes, of which she was pleased to have. Mark was particularly scared, and screamed throughout the trial. Emily also had a panic attack, and claimed she was claustrophobic. The only blue team member to quit her bed was Crissy who said she was freezing. On the Orange team, Sinitta, needless to say, did not come face to face with her cockroaches, as she only lasted 5 minutes in the bed. Fatima had rats, Willie had crickets, Stefanie had soldier crabs, Antony had snakes and Lorraine had yabbies. Antony gave up just after his second lot of snakes came in. With only four team members left, the Orange Team lost the trial after lasting 29 hours and 22 minutes compared to the Blue Team's 35 hours and 56 minutes. The Blue team therefore won immunity from the first public elimination. At the end of the episode, Ant and Dec announced that the campmate the public had eliminated first was Stefanie, and so she therefore had to say goodbye to the other campmates.
11	"Episode 11"	25 November 2011	90 minutes
This episode marked the first time this series that the campmates decided who took part in the bushtucker trial, instead of the public. It was announced that the trial was called Coral Grief, and after much deliberation the campmates decided that Emily should take part, as she had not yet done a trial and claimed to be good at swimming. The trial took place in water, and Emily had to dive down to the bottom and rummage around in different holes for stars, with the likes of eels, crabs, fish, and a particular crocodile whom she was slightly afraid of as company. Despite this fear, Emily managed to find all the stars, and so the campmates enjoyed a hearty meal that night. Mark and Antony were chosen to take part in the celebrity chest of that afternoon, and when they went down into the forest they noticed a large jail-like set, in which there stood 11 people dressed as gorillas behind the bars. Each gorilla was a family member/friend of one of the campmates, and Antony and Mark had to choose five questions to ask the gorillas (they all had paddles with "Yes" or "No" on them). The gorillas were Mark's mum, Sinitta's mum, Crissy's friend, Fatima's son, Willie's wife, Pat's wife, Lorraine's friend, Jessica-Jane's fiance, Emily's mum, Antony's dad, and Dougie's bandmate, Tom. At the end of the episode, the bottom two in the vote for elimination were announced as Crissy and Sinitta. After a pause, Ant and Dec announced that Sinitta would leave the camp that day, much to her relief.
12	"Episode 12"	26 November 2011	60 minutes
In this episode, it was decided amongst the campmates that Jessica-Jane would take part in today's trial, entitled Fair Dunk'em. The trial consisted of five train carts, filled with the likes of eels, fish guts, snakes, rats and slime, and she was lowered into each one in a harness and had to rummage around untying knots to retrieve stars. Unfortunately, Jessica-Jane only managed to untie 6 out of the 10 stars, but her campmates were still overjoyed. A while after Jessica-Jane had returned to camp, it was announced that each campmate would have to give a speech while sitting around a round table with swords, about why they should be crowned Jungle Prince/Princess for the next few days, with their own throne, royal bed, and servants. After all the speeches, the male with the majority of votes from other campmates was Willie. Prince Willie had to choose his princess: Lorraine. They then chose their "servants" and their positions: the most notable were Antony as chef, Dougie as "jungle bike", and of course, Pat as skivvy, tending to Princess Lorraine's every need. Fatima and Pat headed down into the jungle to take part in today's celebrity chest, in which they had to find several numbers inside real coconuts. They had to use a wooden pole to smash each coconut and when they found all the numbers, they could return to camp with the chest. The question was directed at Willie, and when he got it right, the campmates enjoyed a nice little feast of jam tarts. At the end of the episode, Ant and Dec announced that tomorrow, Fatima and Pat would take part in a trial called Fill Your Face Extreme, in which they would have helmets placed onto their heads filled with various critters, and the loser of the trial would leave camp immediately, with the winner heading back to camp to break the news.

=== Week 3 ===
No.	Title	Original release date	Duration
13	"Episode 13"	27 November 2011	90 minutes
The episode starts with Fatima and Pat being greeted by Ant and Dec, where they are told the rules and consequences of the bushtucker trial - "Fill Your Face Extreme" - where they put their face into a helmet of various jungle insects and creatures. If they lasted thirty seconds in the helmet, they scored a point and there were five rounds. If they won they go back and feed the camp. With Fatima winning the coin toss, she decided to go first. The first round consisted of soldier crabs and both contestants had no trouble at all. The second round consisted of meal worms, crickets and scorpions. Round three had spiders, round 4 had snakes and round 5 had cockroaches with both campmates successfully staying in the helmet for thirty seconds on each. After round 5 Fatima had to get medical attention after a cockroach went up her nose. It was then put to a tie-breaker which involved the celebrities dunking their heads into slime and meal worms, with the first to pull out three stars being the winner. As Fatima fished out her three stars first, she won the trial and went back to camp, meaning that Pat had to leave the jungle for good. Also in the episode, the new jungle roles were announced, with the new roles including Fatima being Chef (much to Antony's dismay), Jessica being Skivvy and Emily being the Bike. Mark and Emily competed in the latest Celebrity Chest, which consisted of bursting balloon with a pointed hat, while on a bouncy castle, to get a key. They got the chest and when they bought it back to camp they got the question correct, and won cucumber sanwiches. Antony & Dougie were set a task to become "camp traitors" and burned Lorraine's crown as their first mission. It was announced at the end of this episode that Lorraine was the next campmate to leave the jungle.
14	"Episode 14"	28 November 2011	90 minutes
In this episode, Mark faced the latest bushtucker trial, entitled Pits of Peril. The trial involved travelling through "pits" of various things including slime and fish guts in order to turn a wheel which wins a star. The star would lower when he turned the wheel (at the same time a drop box of critters would fall on him) and he would have little time to travel through the pits to collect the stars. Mark managed to win eight stars out of a possible eight, winning meals for the camp that night. In the latest celebrity chest, Emily and Jessica-Jane had to collect clues to unlock the chest by going on a mechanical horse trying to collect clues in the air with a joust. They didn't manage to get the clues but after a stroke of skill and luck they correctly guessed the combination to the chest. Despite winning the chest, the incorrectly guessed the answer and therefore were given a set of water pistols. After Lorraine's departure, Crissy was voted to become the new "princess" of the camp, whilst Dougie was put into the stocks after it was revealed the camp had not performed their roles properly. Antony and Dougie also continued their mission as jungle traitors, and this episode, they successfully managed to steal the towels of all their fellow campmates. Ant and Dec announced that the public had voted Jessica-Jane to be the next celebrity to leave the jungle. In her post-elimination interview, she said she now wanted Willie to win.
15	"Episode 15"	29 November 2011	90 minutes
Ant and Dec present the latest action from the jungle. Crissy and Willie took on the latest bushtucker trial entitled "The Mystery Box" which enlisted having to guess jungle creatures while in a huge box blindfolded. In different rounds they had to use different parts of their body to identify the animal. They managed to win 5 out of a possible 7 stars. In the latest celebrity chest Emily and Mark had to extract two swords out of a huge ice block, and after much time and many methods they managed to do so and won the chest. When they took the chest back to camp they got the question wrong and won the booby prize of cleaning equipment. Antony and Dougie committed their last act of treason, which involved putting out the fire and blaming it on someone else (of which they chose Fatima) and swapping everybody's luxury items around in their bags. When Willie and Crissy were told there was a traitor in camp, they had to guess who the two were. They answered incorrectly and were therefore sent to the Jungle Dungeon, which was pitch black inside. However they did not spend the whole night in the dungeon and therefore failed to win breakfast for camp. Meanwhile, while Crissy and Willie were being punished everyone else received packages from home. When Willie and Crissy returned they were very upset, especially with Antony and Dougie, which upset Antony so much that he cried. At the end Ant and Dec announced that the next celebrity to leave the jungle was Emily. In her post-elimination interview she said that she now wanted either Fatima or Willie to win.
16	"Episode 16"	30 November 2011	90 minutes
The episode began with a tense atmosphere in camp, as Willie and Crissy were still wrongfully upset from yesterday's events, (for no reason). They both received their gift packs from loved ones, but Antony remained upset as Willie hadn't thanked him or apologized for overreacting and being spoilt. Dougie celebrated his birthday by taking part in today's bushtucker trial, entitled Race Around the Clock, in which he lay on a huge clock face and had to insert his head into six boxes to retrieve stars with his mouth, in various puzzle circumstances, with obstacles including stick insects, snakes, slime, cockroaches and mealworms, spiders and rats. He managed to obtain six out of six stars. A special surprise dawned on the campmates later that day, as a special birthday treat for Dougie. Five songs were played into the camp, and if the campmates guessed two song titles/artists correctly, then they would win the reward. They did, and the reward was then hauled into camp by two staff members. When Dougie opened the box, much to everybody's surprise, singer and former contestant Peter Andre stepped out and announced he would be there for the rest of the night, and helped the campmates create their own song. That night, the campmates were assigned with a quiz, and set up into two teams: one with Dougie, Willie, and Antony, and the other with Fatima, Crissy and Mark. Whoever won the quiz won a reward, which was to spend the rest of the night in a jacuzzi with Andre. The winners (4–2) were Willie's team, and so Antony, Willie, Dougie enjoyed an evening with Andre in the Jacuzzi, whereas Fatima, Mark and Crissy remained in camp. At the end of the episode, Ant and Dec announced that the seventh person to be eliminated from the jungle was Crissy.
17	"Episode 17"	1 December 2011	90 minutes
Ant and Dec present the latest action from the jungle. After last night in the jacuzzi, Willie ended up a bit drunk and fell into bed with Antony, an event Antony couldn't remember when he woke up. After much deliberation the camp decided that taking part in the next bushtucker trial (entitled "Splash and Grab") would be Antony and Fatima. The trial consisted of Fatima blindfolded being directed by Antony, who was on a "lift me up" over water, towards stars before depositing them it the box. They managed to gain 2 out of a possible 5 stars and while Antony was very happy, Fatima thought they could have done better. The campmates were then set the challenge of creating their own jungle soap, and with Antony as director, they got into full swing, and it was a great success. (To see the full soap episode go to www.itv.com/celebrity). This episode also saw the last celebrity chest with Mark and Dougie, which included them fitting marbles through a tiny hole to get the key, while wearing annoying kangaroo costumes. They managed to get the key; however, when they brought the chest back to the camp, they got the question wrong and ended up with the booby prize of various items - all with pictures of Antony on them. At the end of the episode Ant and Dec announced the next campmate to leave the jungle was Willie, who said in his post-exit interview that the whole thing was one of the best experiences of his life.
18	"Episode 18"	2 December 2011	90 minutes
Ant and Dec present all the action from the penultamate day in the jungle. All four celebrities faced the classic bushtucker trial named "Celebrity Cyclone" which involves the celebrities travelling up a water slide to place the stars on four different markers; however, they have to do it while the water slide is in progress and they are having various items thrown at them. After a lot of effort and determination the celebrities managed to gain all four stars available, which they were all very pleased about. Ant and Dec announced that two people were leaving the jungle today and went down into camp to tell them that the next person leaving the camp was Antony, who in his post-exit interview stated that he wanted Dougie or Mark to win. All the celebrities took part in a variation of Jenga which involves extracting blocks from a tower without knocking the tower down. They managed to extract 9 blocks before it fell down, and therefore won 9 prizes including hot chips, bread and ice cream. Celebrities also received letters from home, which meant there was a lot of tears all round, especially with Mark and Fatima who had been missing their families while in the jungle. The remaining celebrities also hosted the "Jungle Awards" (with Antony as host); however, what was intended to be a fun game turned into completely the opposite when Fatima thought that she should win every good award that was going. Antony burst out when she said she had the 'Best Body': "You, best body, walking about in that stupid leopard bikini, I mean, put it away Grandma". In the end Fatima accepted the award for "Most Hard Working" campmate while others including "Bravest" went to Lorraine and "Most Scared" going to Sinitta. The "Best Body" award ended up going to Mark. At the end of the episode Ant and Dec returned to camp and said that the next celebrity the public decided was to leave the jungle (and finish 3rd) was Fatima. When she exited she brought with her the cockroach that got stuck up her nose during the "Fill Your Face Extreme" trial.
19	"Episode 19"	3 December 2011	60 minutes
The episode started with a two-way bushtucker trial, in which Dougie and Mark both had to eat four disgusting foods each, in order to win a starter, main course, dessert and drink of their choice that night in a massive banquet in the camp. Mark had a cockroach cocktail, two live beechworms, a cricket with vomit fruit dipping sauce and a fish eye to eat, whereas Dougie had a beverage of emu liver, a witchetty grub, part of an ostrich's anus and part of a bush pig's penis. Since Mark and Dougie had completed the whole trial, they were both allowed to pick one starter, main course, dessert and beverage each, and they pulled out all the stops to ensure their final banquet was massive: Mark ordered garlic bread with cheese, a large deep-pan pizza, brownies with ice cream and a Snickers milkshake, while Dougie ordered lasagne, spaghetti with meatballs, sticky toffee pudding and an Oreo and chocolate chip cookie milkshake. Despite their different orders, both Mark and Dougie shared their meals, so they each had a bit of each meal. After many loud burps the boys finally settled down to bed, saying they were very full but the meal was worth it. The next morning Dougie and Mark were called up across the bridge, to discuss their favourite moments from their jungle experience and were shown highlight reels containing the likes of bushtucker trials, friendships and arguments. Before the winner was announced, Mark said that no matter what happened, he'd always think of himself as the winner, for getting as far as he did in the competition. At the end of the episode Ant and Dec announced that the king of the jungle this year was Dougie. He was very clearly astounded by this, and Mark congratulated him by saying that no better person could have won, and that Dougie deserved to win. He was then awarded with his crown by I'm a Celebrity...Get Me Out of Here! NOW! presenters Laura Whitmore and Joe Swash, before taking his lap of honour down the red-carpet bridge to be greeted by his bandmate Tom Fletcher who was delighted to see him.

=== After the Jungle ===
No.	Title	Original release date	Duration
20	"The Coming Out Show"	5 December 2011	60 minutes
We see how celebrities reacted and dealt with life after they left the jungle. This includes backstage access to their hotel where we find out what they do when they return to their normal life. Plus we get to see the big "end night luxury party" with all the celebrities.
21	"ITV2 Special (Highlights of the Series)"	6 December 2011	60 minutes
Highlights of the series including bushtucker trials, celebrity chest, exits, break ups, romances and general day-to-day jungle life.

== Ratings ==
Official ratings are taken from the Broadcasters' Audience Research Board. All viewing figures are in millions and does not include ITV HD. The coming out show is not added into the series average, as it is an extra show shown after the series has ended. There were no shows on 15 or 23 November due to live football being shown, however, the ITV2 show still aired as normal.

Episode	Date	Official ITV rating (millions)	ITV weekly rank	Official ITV HD rating (millions)	Official ITV +1 rating (millions)	Total ITV viewers (millions)	Share
1	13 November	11.10	2	1.38	0.29	12.77	42.4%
2	14 November	9.63	4	1.00	0.74	11.37	36.1%
3	16 November	8.54	7	0.91	0.42	9.87	32.2%
4	17 November	7.87	11	0.90	0.61	9.38	30.0%
5	18 November	6.98	19	0.88	0.42	8.28	24.7%
6	19 November	8.23	8	0.95	0.49	9.67	32.7%
7	20 November	9.43	5	1.17	0.26	10.86	35.5%
8	21 November	8.42	9	1.06	0.62	10.10	31.5%
9	22 November	7.61	14	0.95	0.66	9.22	28.4%
10	24 November	8.32	11	1.01	0.48	9.81	32.9%
11	25 November	8.42	10	0.98	0.25	9.65	35.6%
12	26 November	8.52	7	0.91	0.37	9.80	35.4%
13	27 November	9.36	4	1.18	0.27	10.81	37.2%
14	28 November	8.56	6	0.92	0.40	9.88	32.5%
15	29 November	8.34	10	0.91	0.38	9.63	30.5%
16	30 November	8.44	9	1.00	0.49	9.93	31.2%
17	1 December	8.14	12	0.89	0.40	9.43	31.6%
18	2 December	8.60	5	0.93	—N/a	9.53	34.8%
19	3 December 2011	9.62	3	1.20	0.27	11.09	40.8%
Series average	**2011**	**8.64**	—N/a	**0.96**	**0.43**	**10.06**	**33.5%**
Coming Out!	5 December 2011	6.35	15	0.79	0.37	7.51	23.8%
