= Mark Wright (TV personality) =

English television personality (born 1987)

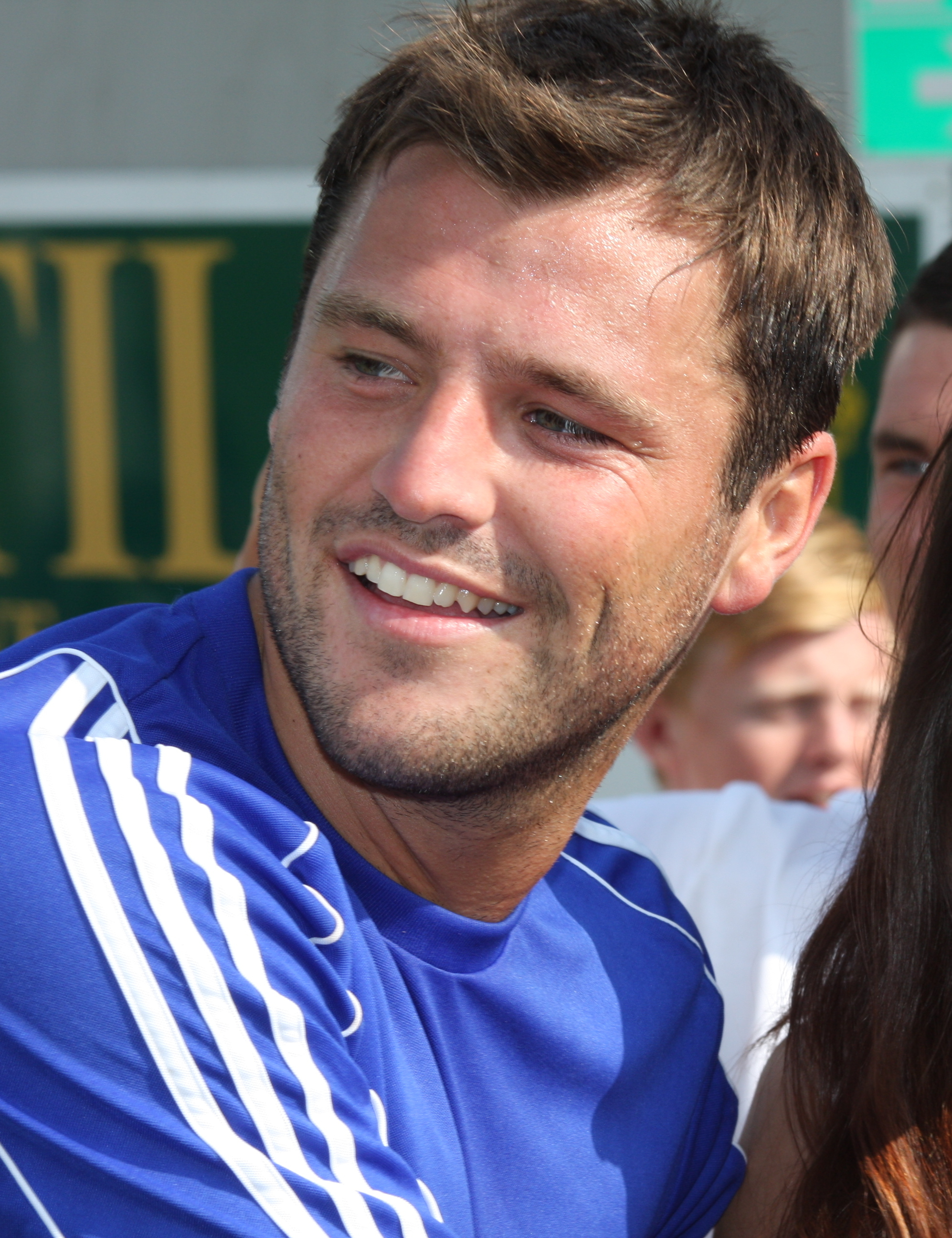
- Wright in 2011
- Born: Mark Charles Edward Wright; 20 January 1987 (age 39); Buckhurst Hill, Essex, England
- Occupations: Television personality; radio presenter; footballer
- Known for: The Only Way is Essex (2010–2011); I'm a Celebrity...Get Me Out of Here! (2011); Take Me Out: The Gossip (2012–2013) (2015–2017); Surprise Surprise (2013–2015); Strictly Come Dancing (2014); Extra (2017–2020)
- Spouse: Michelle Keegan (m. 2015)
- Children: 1
- Mother: Carol Wright
- Relatives: Jess Wright (sister); Josh Wright (brother); Nanny Pat (maternal grandmother)
Association football career
- Position: Left-back
Youth career
- 1994–1998: West Ham United
- 1998–2001: Arsenal
- 2001–2005: Tottenham Hotspur
Senior career*
Years	Team	Apps	(Gls)
2005–2006	Southend United	0	(0)
2005–2006	→ Lewes (loan)	7	(0)
2006–2007	Grays Athletic	0	(0)
2006–2007	→ Crawley Town (loan)	9	(1)
2007	→ Rushden & Diamonds (loan)	3	(0)
2007	→ St Albans City (loan)		
2007	Bishop's Stortford		
2007	Fisher Athletic		
2008–2009	Thurrock	19	(2)
2009	Bishop's Stortford	21	(1)
2011	Heybridge Swifts	2	(0)
2011	Thurrock	0	(0)
2020–2021	Crawley Town	1	(0)
Total		62	(4)
International career
2008	England C	1	(0)
- * Club domestic league appearances and goals as of 16:08, 6 February 2021 (UTC)

Mark Charles Edward Wright (born 20 January 1987) is an English television personality, radio presenter and former professional footballer who played as a left-back. He is best known for appearing as a cast member on the first three series of The Only Way Is Essex.

Wright gained more popularity after appearing on the eleventh series of I'm a Celebrity...Get Me Out of Here! where he finished as runner-up, and the twelfth series of Strictly Come Dancing, where he finished in fourth place. He is also a presenter on Heart's Saturday afternoon slot.

== Club career ==
=== Early career ===
Before his appearances on The Only Way Is Essex, Wright was a professional footballer, with a youth career at West Ham United, Arsenal, and Tottenham Hotspur. He started his senior career with Southend United, but moved into nightclub promoting and playing only non-league.

=== Grays Athletic and loan spells ===
In November 2006, he was loaned from Grays Athletic to fellow Conference National side Crawley Town. On 27 January 2007, he scored the only goal of a 1–0 win at Tamworth. In March that year, he was loaned to Rushden & Diamonds for the rest of the season.

=== Return to Crawley Town ===
Wright made his return to professional football at the age of 33 on 14 December 2020, signing for League Two side Crawley Town on a non-contract basis. He started his return in the third round of the FA Cup, coming on as a 90th minute substitute as Crawley won 3–0 against Premier League side Leeds United on 10 January 2021. His brother, Josh, also played in the match, having signed for Crawley in January 2021. Wright made his League Two debut against Harrogate Town on 6 February, and was substituted at half time in a 3–1 home loss. He was released by Crawley at the end of the 2020–21 season.

== International career ==
Wright played once for the England national C team, playing in a defeat to Bosnia and Herzegovina B on 16 September 2008.

== Television career ==
In October 2010, Wright was one of the original cast members in the ITV reality programme The Only Way is Essex. He announced his departure from the show on 23 October 2011, near the end of the third series. He later returned for a cameo appearance in the sixth series and also, for the 2012 Christmas special. He briefly returned again in 2014 and again in 2016.

In November 2011, Wright took part in the eleventh series of I'm a Celebrity...Get Me Out of Here!. He was the runner-up, losing to McFly bassist Dougie Poynter.

From January 2012 until 2017, Wright and Laura Jackson co-presented the Take Me Out spin-off programme Take Me Out: The Gossip for ITV2. Zoe Hardman previously hosted with Wright. The series did not air in 2018. He also appeared as a fitness expert on the ITV Breakfast programme Daybreak for two weeks, to front its mini series Downsize in Dubai.

From 20 June to 7 July 2012, Wright presented and starred in a new ITV2 show, titled Mark Wright's Hollywood Nights. It was later dropped after one series. He was due to co-present with Melanie Sykes on a new entertainment series named My Man Can. After filming one series, ITV made the decision not to air the show.

Since 2013, Wright was a reporter on the ITV series Surprise Surprise.

In 2014, Wright fronted his own ITV2 reality show entitled Party Wright Around The World. In 2014, Wright was one of the celebrities competing in the twelfth series of Strictly Come Dancing. He was paired up with professional dancer Karen Hauer. The couple made into the final in which they came fourth.

Wright also presented The Dengineers with Lauren Layfield on CBBC from 2015 until 2017. He left at the end of the second series and was replaced by Joe Tracini.

In December 2016, Wright made an appearance on an episode of E!'s The Royals (season 3, episode 1).

Wright presented on the American entertainment news programme EXTRA by Warner Bros from 2017 to 2020.

Wright presents series 6 of Channel 5's The Bachelor, based on the US television show of the same name.

On 5 July 2019, Wright guest presented This Morning with Rochelle Humes. Wright starred in the BBC programme Who Do You Think You Are? in September 2019.

In January 2021, Wright featured in a BBC iPlayer mini-series, Mark Wright: The Last Chance, about his efforts to revive his professional football career with Crawley Town.

In 2026 Wright became the presenter for the fourth series of Clean It, Fix It

== Radio career ==
Since 24 December 2012, Wright has presented the "Club Classics" show every Friday and Saturday evening on Heart, between 7 pm and 9 pm. He left in December 2017 when he moved to the United States, and returned to the station in July 2019. In March 2020, after the defection of Sian Welby to Capital FM, he took up the Monday to Thursday evening slot at the station.

In December 2021, he left the Monday-Thursday evening slot with Dev Griffin taking over at the start of the new year. He now presents the Saturday early evening show from 4-7pm.

As of March 2024, Wright hosts a weekly show with Olly Murs from 9am-12pm on Saturdays, across the Heart radio network.

== Other work ==
In June 2013, Wright was signed by online retail giant, Littlewoods, as its new face of menswear, which sees him style and model a capsule collection each season for Littlewoods' own-brand menswear line, Goodsouls. In September 2018 he was signed by Matalan as the face of their menswear range.

In June 2016, he took part in Soccer Aid for the first time. He played for 'England'. He scored a goal from a direct free kick in the 3–2 victory, and was named Man of the Match. Wright also played in the 2018 and 2019 editions of Soccer Aid.

== Personal life ==
Mark is the son of Carol and Mark Wright, Sr, the brother of fellow professional footballer Josh Wright, whom he played alongside at Crawley Town, and fellow The Only Way is Essex cast member Jess Wright. He has a younger sister. His grandmother was Nanny Pat.

On 22 February 2009, Wright was best man at the wedding of the reality star Jade Goody and Jack Tweed, as he was a childhood friend of the groom. Footage of the ceremony was shown in the Sky Living series Jade: The Reality Star Who Changed Britain in 2019. In August 2011, Wright appeared at Redbridge Magistrates' Court charged with using threatening behaviour on a night out. He was found not guilty, while Tweed pleaded guilty to common assault.

Wright was in a relationship with fellow TOWIE cast member Lauren Goodger. Since December 2012, Wright has been in a relationship with former Coronation Street actress Michelle Keegan. They married on 24 May 2015. In December 2024, the couple announced they were expecting their first child together. Their daughter was born on 6 March 2025. They live in Epping.

In 2016, Wright appeared on This Morning to talk about his experience with symmetry OCD as part of the 2016 OCD Awareness Week. In December 2021, Wright underwent an operation to remove a 12 cm tumour, which was later revealed to be non-cancerous.

According to Who Do You Think You Are?, Mark's great-great-grandfather was of Jewish heritage, and his nine-times great grandfather, David Antonio de Mendoza, was a converso of Sephardic Jewish descent who was arrested by the Spanish Inquisition in 1696 accused of secretly practising his ancestors' religion. David, who was 36 at the time, was tortured for two years in Seville using methods including the toca. Once out of prison, David moved his family to Amsterdam where it was safe to practise their faith. His nephew Miguel, however, returned to Spain and was burned at the stake.

== Political views ==
Wright is a supporter of the Conservative Party and called for people to support then-Prime Minister Theresa May; he also endorsed Shaun Bailey for the 2021 London Mayoral election.

== Career statistics ==
As of match played 6 February 2021

Appearances and goals by club, season and competition
Club	Season	League			FA Cup		Other		Total	
Club	Season	Division	Apps	Goals	Apps	Goals	Apps	Goals	Apps	Goals
Grays Athletic	2006–07	Conference National	0	0	0	0	1 (Note: Appearance(s) in Essex Senior Cup)	0	1	0
Crawley Town (loan)	2006–07	Conference National	9	1	0	0	0	0	9	1
Rushden & Diamonds (loan)	2006–07	Conference National	3	0	0	0	1 (Note: Appearance(s) in Northamptonshire Senior Cup)	0	4	0
Thurrock	2008–09	Conference South	19	2	1	0	3 (Note: Two appearances one goal in Conference League Cup; one appearance in FA Trophy)	1	23	3
Bishop's Stortford	2008–09	Conference South	13	1	0	0	0	0	13	1
Bishop's Stortford	2009–10	Conference South	8	0	0	0	0	0	8	0
Bishop's Stortford	Total		21	1	0	0	0	0	21	1
Heybridge Swifts	2011–12	Isthmian League Division One North	2	0	0	0	0	0	2	0
Crawley Town	2020–21	League Two	1	0	1	0	0	0	2	0
Career total			55	4	2	0	5	1	62	5

== Filmography ==
As himself
Year	Title	Notes
2010–2011	The Only Way Is Essex	Series regular
2011	I'm a Celebrity...Get Me Out of Here!	Series 11 runner-up
2012	Daybreak	Guest health expert
2012–2013, 2015–2017	Take Me Out: The Gossip	Co-presenter
2012	Mark Wright's Hollywood Nights	Presenter
2012	Mark Wright's Football Saints and Sinners	Presenter
2013–2015	Surprise Surprise	Reporter
2014	Party Wright Around the World	Presenter
2014	Strictly Come Dancing	Contestant
2015–2017	The Dengineers	Co-presenter
2017–2020	Extra	Presenter
2019	The Bachelor	Presenter
2019	Who Do You Think You Are?	Participant
2019	Strictly Come Dancing Christmas Special	Contestant
2021	Mark Wright: The Last Chance	Self, documentary
2023	The Challenge UK	Host
2023	The Challenge: World Championship	Co-host
2023	A Wright Old Adventure	Self

== See also ==
- List of I'm a Celebrity...Get Me Out of Here! (British TV series) contestants
- List of Strictly Come Dancing contestants
