= Natasha Beaumont =

Australian actress

- Born: Natasha Elisabeth Beaumont; 21 June 1974 (age 52); Kuala Lumpur, Malaysia

Natasha Elisabeth Beaumont (born 21 June 1974) is a Malaysian-born British-Australian actress and model.

Beaumont was born in Kuala Lumpur, Malaysia. She grew up in Kuala Lumpur, attended boarding school in Sydney and moved at age 20 to attend Charles Sturt University in Bathurst, Australia. She initially studied set and costume design but changed to acting. Beaumont starred as Talia in Cartoon Network's My Spy Family – a former Russian spy who will now stop at nothing to help her children succeed. The show ended in 2010. She also played Rebecca Green in All Saints from 2001 until 2003 and SJ Fletcher in EastEnders in 2006.

She also played Tania in Rowan Woods' Little Fish, and had a role in the film Dark Love Story. She had guest roles in The Lost World and Farscape, and had a role in Australian police drama Water Rats.

Beaumont has also appeared in several stage productions including David Williamson's Amigos (costarring Gary McDonald) for the Sydney Theatre Company in 2004 and The Return at the Old Red Lion in London, 2005.

She also played 'Saz' in an episode of Peep Show entitled "Jeremy's Broke" (series 5, episode 3).

== Filmography ==
=== Film ===
Year	Title	Role	Notes
2003	Ground Hero	Bikini girl	Short
2005	Little Fish	Tania	
2006	Darklovestory	Sis	
2010	Inception	Bar Sub Con	
2015	Ruben Guthrie	Sheridan	

=== Television ===
Year	Title	Role	Notes
2000	Farscape	Jannix	Episode: "Taking the Stone"
2000	Water Rats	Emily Sadler	2 episodes
2000	The Lost World	Qinaq	Episode: "The Prisoner"
2001-03	All Saints	Rebecca Green	Recurring role
2004	Small Claims	Ginny	TV film
2006	EastEnders	SJ Fletcher	Regular role
2008	Peep Show	Saz	Episode: "Jeremy's Broke"
2007-09	My Spy Family	Talia Bannon	Main role
2010	Tales of Tatonka		Voice
2011	Crownies	Elle Cavenagh	Episode: "1.13"
2012	A Moody Christmas	Oksana	Episode: "Last Minute Airfare"
2014	The Moodys	Oksana	Episode: "Bridget's Surprise 40th"
2015	Hiding	Rayburn	2 episodes
2017	Home and Away	Liz Vincent	3 episodes
