= My Spy Family =

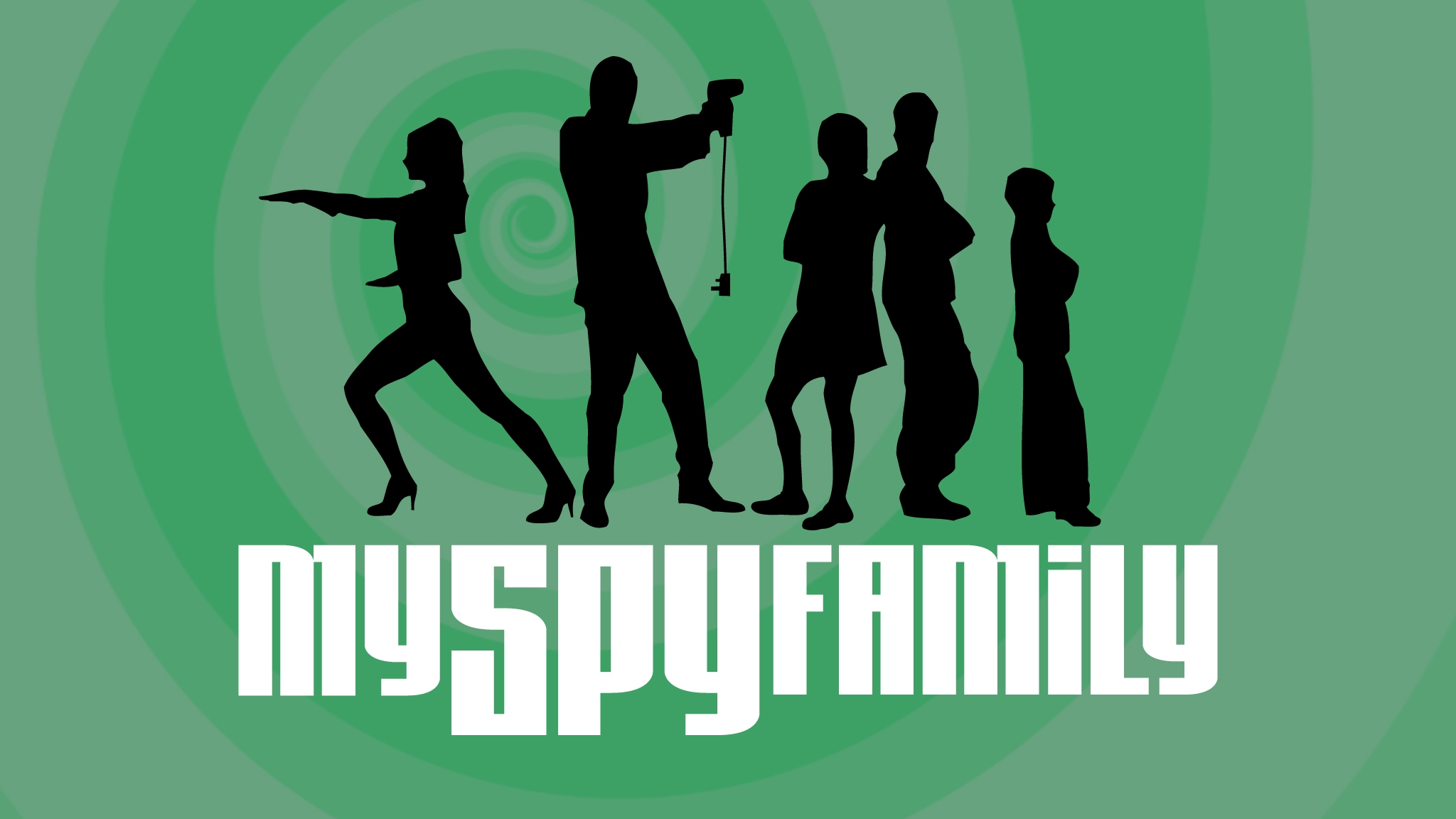
- Genre: Action; Family sitcom
- Created by: Paul Alexander
- Written by: Paul Alexander; Trevor Neal & Simon Hickson; Daniel Peak; Trevelyan Evans; Gary Lawson; John Phelps; Mark Robertson; Clare Trenholm
- Directed by: Dominic MacDonald; Tom Poole; David Sant; Angelo Abela; Frank W. Smith
- Starring: Milo Twomey; Natasha Beaumont; Alice Connor; Joe Tracini; Ignat Pakhotin
- Composer: Glenn Keiles
- Country of origin: United Kingdom
- Original language: English
- No. of series: 3
- No. of episodes: 46

Production
- Executive producers: Anne Brogan and Connal Orton (for Kindle Entertainment); Daniel Lennard and Cecilia Persson (for Cartoon Network Europe)
- Producer: Bernard Krichefski
- Production location: Batley
- Cinematography: Francis De Groote; Dave Parker
- Editors: Mike Eccles; James MacMillan
- Camera setup: Multi-camera
- Running time: 22 minutes approx. (per episode)
- Production companies: Kindle Entertainment; Turner Broadcasting System Europe

Original release
- Network: Boomerang
- Release: 1 September 2007 – 23 January 2010

My Spy Family is a British live-action family comedy series created by Paul Alexander that aired from 2007 to 2010. The series was a co-production between Kindle Entertainment and Turner Broadcasting System Europe, with Decode Enterprises handling distribution. The series aired on Cartoon Network and Boomerang in the UK, TG4 in Ireland, Panda Biggs in Portugal, and Cartoon Network in France, Denmark, Finland, Hungary, Iceland, Italy, Poland, Romania, and South Africa. All the music was written by Glenn Keiles, excluding some songs heard in the "Intelligence Agency Cafe", which were co-written with other songwriters.

== Plot synopsis ==
When master spy Dirk Bannon fell in love with his Russian arch rival, Natalia Knockemoff, things could only get complicated. Now they've been decommissioned, and are supposed to be living a normal life with their three children – Spike, the wannabe secret agent; Elle, happily retired; and a rather odd Boris. But can this family ever be normal? Not when you've got parents with a license to embarrass.

— Opening Narration

The show is about the Bannon family, who all have strong spy links. The parents, Dirk and Talia, were once arch enemies and enemy spies but fell in love and got married. They now have three children (Spike, Elle, and Boris), who have all been brought up with spy techniques as a matter of course. Spike's friend Travis (played by Richard Sargent) is commonly seen on the show.

The action is based in three major locations – the Bannon home, the children's school and the local café, which is run by Des, Dirk's former personal ordnance officer (gadget master).

== Characters ==
=== Main characters ===
- Dirk Bannon (portrayed by Milo Twomey) is a British former spy. He is married to his former arch-rival, Talia, a Russian spy. Dirk is usually a pushover to his wife and is somewhat more incompetent at being a spy than she is. Together, they have three children: Spike, Elle, and Boris. He is best friends with Des, his former personal ordnance officer (gadget master). He is rarely seen wearing something other than a tuxedo.
- Talia Bannon (portrayed by Natasha Beaumont) is the Russian arch-rival of Dirk, who later fell in love and married him, before retiring. As seen in a few episodes she has better fighting techniques as well as better spying techniques than her husband. She also tends to add the suffix "-sky" to words she says, such as referring to herself as "Mumsky." She is also a master of disguise. In "The Back in Batley Affair," she introduces herself as Natalia Alexandrina Vladimir Knockemoff-Bannon after being put in charge of the Intelligence Agency Cafe after Des, the owner, is written out of Series 3.
- Spike Bannon (portrayed by Joe Tracini) is the eldest offspring of Dirk and Talia. Spike is an expert at creating various spy gadgets. Many times, it is shown that he, along with his best friend, Travis, tries to sabotage any plans or simply make a fool of his geography teacher, Mr. Vong, with whom he does not get along well due to Spike's schemes.
- Elle Bannon (portrayed by Alice Connor) is the middle child of Dirk and Talia. Like her mother, she also has very good combat skills and spy techniques. She is often seen hanging out with her friends Donna and Marcy at school and is often at odds with her brother Spike. Talia says there is a 7% chance that she is heir to the throne of Russia.
- Boris Bannon (portrayed by Ignat Pakhotin) is the youngest offspring of Dirk and Talia. He is an expert in setting booby traps and hiding. Though he is a member of the family, he is treated as the most unnoticeable character in the show. He is not often shown and rarely speaks, but when he does, it is in Russian, which no one seems to understand except Talia. He is written out of series 3 in the opener, "The Back in Batley Affair," which describes him as ruling Russia as he looks like the former ruler, which makes Talia proud. However, he eventually returns in "The Boris Bounces Back Affair,"

=== Recurring characters ===
- Des (portrayed by Vas Blackwood) is Dirk's former Personal Ordnance Officer (gadget-master). He has since retired and opened the local Intelligence Agency Cafe, though his kitchen has many various types of gadgets which become useful during spy missions. He is best friends with Dirk, though they occasionally don't get along. He has also shown interest in Talia. Like Boris, he is also written out of season 3, who has gone to Bermuda for a year after he is elected honorary president of the World Shark Surfing Federation, putting Talia in charge.
- Travis Mitchell (portrayed by Richard Sargent) is Spike's best friend. He is very loyal to Spike and is always willing to help him.
- Mr. Ernest Vong (portrayed by Ramon Tikaram) is the school's geography teacher who seems to have the most authority. Spike sees Vong as an adversary, who schemes and pranks against him to get what he wants (which always fails), making Vong greatly dislike Spike, although he has no ill feelings for the rest of his family. It is hinted that he is Indian, as there is a map of India in his classroom. In the episode "The Mum's The Word Affair", it is revealed that he lives with his mother, who in turn revealed his first name.
- Donna Jacobs (portrayed by Cascade Brown) is a close friend of Elle and is mostly seen hanging out with her and Marcy. Donna is obsessed with fashion, and boyfriends and wishes to be a model. Talia often comments that she will be unable to be a model or have boyfriends due to her ankles.
- Marcy Desmond (portrayed by Kirsty Leigh Porter) is a shy friend of Elle and is mostly seen hanging out with Elle and Donna. Most of the time it is observed that she is the exact opposite of Donna since she has no fashion sense nor has any boyfriend.
- Mike Quiller (portrayed by Dan Li) is a former MI5 office boy, who Talia hires to help out after Des has left and gone to Bermuda for a year to be honorary president of the World Shark Surfing Federation. Mike is a big fan of Dirk.

== Episodes ==
=== Season 1 (2007) ===
No. overall	No. in series	Title	Directed by	Written by	Original release date
1	1	"The Lock-In Affair"	Tom Poole	Daniel Peak	1 September 2007
2	2	"The Friends Disunited Affair"	Dominic MacDonald	Paul Alexander	8 September 2007
3	3	"The Dirky Dancing Affair"	Tom Poole	Paul Alexander	15 September 2007
4	4	"The Charity Begins at Home Affair"	Dominic MacDonald	Paul Alexander	22 September 2007
5	5	"The Bullets Over Batley Affair"	Dominic MacDonald	Mark Robertson	29 September 2007
6	6	"The Prefect Storm Affair"	Tom Poole	Paul Alexander	6 October 2007
7	7	"The Tenth Flask Affair"	Tom Poole	Daniel Peak	13 October 2007
8	8	"The Truffles Are Forever Affair"	Tom Poole	Brian Lynch	20 October 2007
9	9	"The 'Up Horoscope!' Affair"	Dominic MacDonald	Trevor Neal and Simon Hickson	27 October 2007
10	10	"The Inspector Foils Affair"	Tom Poole	Julie Gearey	4 November 2007
11	11	"The Vladimir Spensky Affair"	Tom Poole	Daniel Peak	10 November 2007
12	12	"The Spy Who Didn't Quite Love Me Enough Affair"	Dominic MacDonald	Mark Robertson	17 November 2007
13	13	"The Albovian Affair Affair"	Dominic MacDonald	Paul Alexander	24 November 2007

=== Season 2 (2008) ===
No. overall	No. in series	Title	Directed by	Written by	Original release date
14	1	"The Love Is the Drug Affair"	Angelo Abela	Joe Williams	6 September 2008
15	2	"The Des Res Affair"	David Sant	Paul Alexander	13 September 2008
16	3	"The Quiz Night Affair"	David Sant	Trevor Neal and Simon Hickson	20 September 2008
17	4	"The Batley's Got Talent Affair"	Frank W. Smith	Paul Alexander	27 September 2008
18	5	"The Live and Let Dine Affair"	Angelo Abela	Paul Alexander	4 October 2008
19	6	"The Talia's Day Affair"	David Sant	Connal Orton	11 October 2008
20	7	"The Persuasion Affair"	Frank W. Smith	Chris Reddy	18 October 2008
21	8	"The Knowledge Is Power Affair"	David Sant	Gary Lawson and John Phelps	25 October 2008
22	9	"The Stroganoff Night Affair"	Frank W. Smith	Trevelyan Evans	1 November 2008
23	10	"The Laughing Lord Affair"	David Sant	Trevor Neal and Simon Hickson	8 November 2008
24	11	"The Mum's the Word Affair"	Frank W. Smith	Paul Alexander	15 November 2008
25	12	"The Who's the Daddy Affair"	Frank W. Smith	Paul Alexander	22 November 2008
There is a misunderstanding with Spike's birth certificate, which leads him to believe Mr. Vong is his real father.
26	13	"The Bum Deal Affair"	David Sant	Paul Alexander	29 November 2008

=== Season 3 (2009–10) ===
No. overall	No. in series	Title	Directed by	Written by	Original release date
27	1	"The Back in Batley Affair"	Dominic MacDonald	Paul Alexander	5 September 2009
After coming back from their summer holiday, the Bannons find that things have changed; Boris has become the new ruler of Russia, Travis has a new best friend who's a Battlestar Galactica fanatic, and Des has gone to Bermuda for a year, leaving Talia in charge of his cafe.
28	2	"The Des Mondi Code Affair"	Tom Poole	Paul Alexander	12 September 2009
29	3	"The 1950s Affair"	Dominic MacDonald	Trevor Neal and Simon Hickson	19 September 2009
30	4	"The Cammy Loves Spikey Affair"	Tom Poole	Paul Alexander	26 September 2009
31	5	"The Chat Show Affair"	Dominic MacDonald	Daniel Peak	3 October 2009
32	6	"The Back Scratch Affair"	Tom Poole	Trevelyan Evans and Paul Alexander	10 October 2009
33	7	"The Spy Pod Affair"	Tom Poole	Paul Alexander and Clare Trenholm	17 October 2009
34	8	"The Hoop Loop Snoop Affair"	Tom Poole	Trevor Neal and Simon Hickson	24 October 2009
35	9	"The Black Widows Affair"	Dominic MacDonald	Paul Alexander	31 October 2009
36	10	"The Fakers & Adders Affair"	Dominic MacDonald	Paul Alexander and Clare Trenholm	7 November 2009
37	11	"The Trophy Affair"	David Sant	Mark Oswin and James Griffiths	14 November 2009
38	12	"The Election Affair"	Angelo Abela	Gary Lawson and John Phelps	21 November 2009
39	13	"The Schoolboy Spy Affair"	Dominic MacDonald	Trevor Neal and Simon Hickson	28 November 2009
40	14	"The Awful Aunty Affair"	Angelo Abela	Glen Dolman	5 December 2009
41	15	"The Thick-Skinned Spike Affair"	Dominic MacDonald	Trevor Neal and Simon Hickson	12 December 2009
42	16	"The Mothers in the Hood Affair"	Angelo Abela	Paul Alexander	19 December 2009
43	17	"The Cheating Affair"	David Sant	Matthew Broughton	2 January 2010
44	18	"The Boris Bounces Back Affair"	Angelo Abela	Paul Alexander	9 January 2010
45	19	"The Pen Is Mightier Affair"	David Sant	Paul Alexander	16 January 2010
46	20	"The Brought to Book Affair"	Angelo Abela	Paul Alexander	23 January 2010

== Production ==
The series was a co-production between Turner Broadcasting System and Kindle Entertainment. Turner announced in March 2008 that a second series of 20 episodes was in production, filming for which was set to begin in July.
