= Mark Wright's Hollywood Nights =

- Genre: Reality television
- Created by: Tony Wood and Mark Wright
- Directed by: Angelo Abela
- Starring: Mark Wright; Neil Dobias; Tommy Smith; Nick Wilson; Georgie Wright; Chelsea Rashoff; Tina Manera; Hayley Marie Norman; Lauren Elise; Ashley Rogers; Errik Tustenuggee
- Narrated by: Mark Wright
- Country of origin: United Kingdom
- Original language: English
- No. of series: 1
- No. of episodes: 5

Production
- Running time: 60 mins (inc. adverts)
- Production company: Lime Pictures

Original release
- Network: ITV2
- Release: 10 June – 9 July 2012

Related
- The Only Way Is Essex; It's All About Amy

Mark Wright's Hollywood Nights is a British reality television series starring former The Only Way Is Essex star Mark Wright. The show features Mark and his best mates Neil Dobias, Tommy Smith, Nick Wilson, and Georgie Wright as they leave Essex, England for the holiday of a lifetime in Los Angeles, California.

On 23 August 2012 the series was canceled due to poor ratings.

== Episodes ==
=== Episode 1 ===
Mark, Neil, Tommy, Nick and Georgie land in LA, but get lost looking for accommodation. They are given a basic car, and when they arrive at their hotel things turn from bad to worse as they hear a gunshot in the adjoining room. Soon after, a policeman (Errik Tustenuggee) knocks at the door and questions the boys. However, as always, Mark turns things around as he bags himself and the other boys a top-notch villa for the rest of their holiday.

=== Episode 2 ===
The boys head to the ocean, where they hang out with a top volleyball squad. Neil gets a makeover, Tommy and Nick visit a health food store, Georgie searches for a new car and a pampering session leaves one of the tourists speechless.

=== Episode 3 ===
With Tommy still feeling homesick, Mark decides that the boys need an adventure, so they set off to Yosemite National Park for some camping and male bonding, but their survival skills are put to the test when Tommy gets out of his depth, Neil gets friendly with local wildlife and they receive unexpected visitors.

=== Episode 4 ===
Tina, Hayley, Lauren and Chelsea try to get the boys involved in Los Angeles sporting culture, and take them to a baseball game. Mark realises he misses football, and manages to train with Vinnie Jones' Hollywood All-Stars team. A night out involves drinking and bucking broncos, and romance seems likely for one member of the group.

=== Episode 5 ===
The boys head to a film set to practise their cowboy skills, with Tommy trying to impress Hayley with his lasso technique and Neil and Nick battling for Lauren's affections. With their time in California drawing to a close, Mark throws a farewell pool party and one of the lads has a surprise admirer.

== Reception ==
=== Ratings ===
Episode viewing figures from BARB.

Episode no.	Air date	Total viewers	ITV2 weekly ranking	References
1	10 June 2012	Under 598,000	Outside top 10	
2	17 June 2012	598,000	7	
3	24 June 2012	512,000	10	
4	1 July 2012	612,000	10	
5	8 July 2012	Under 528,000	Outside top 10	

== Cast ==
- Mark Wright
- Neil Dobias
- Tommy Smith
- Nick Wilson
- Georgie Wright
- Chelsea Rashoff
- Tina Manera
- Hayley Marie Norman
- Lauren Elise
- Ashley Rogers
- Errik Tustenuggee (as Errik T Williams)
