= The Dengineers =

British children's television programme

- Genre: Children's television series; DIY
- Directed by: Mel Taylor; Paul Benham; James Knight; Jay Ahmed; Charlotte Ingham
- Presented by: Lauren Layfield (series 1-4); Mark Wright (series 1-2); Joe Tracini (series 3-6); Meryl Fernandes (series 5-7); Joe Swash (series 7)
- Starring: Tony Broomhead; Satwinder Samra; Maral Tulip; Anthony Devine; Emma Kosh; Olga Skumial; Sege Rosella; Dee Saigal; Lynsey Ford; Martin Bell; Sahiba Chadha
- Country of origin: United Kingdom
- Original language: English
- No. of series: 7
- No. of episodes: 94

Production
- Executive producer: Annette Williams
- Producers: Jennifer Morrison; Mel Taylor; Paul Benham; James Knight; Jay Ahmed; Charlotte Ingham; Tanuja East; Matt Botten; Laura Davies-Parry; Matt Peacock
- Running time: 28 minutes
- Production company: CBBC Productions

Original release
- Network: CBBC
- Release: 21 November 2015 – 22 January 2023

The Dengineers is a British children's television series which airs on CBBC and sees the production team (styled as 'dengineers') design themed dens or play houses for children. There have been seven series aired to date, with the most recent hosted by Meryl Fernandes and Joe Swash and previous hosts being Lauren Layfield, Mark Wright and Joe Tracini. The designers are currently Tony Broomhead, Satwinder Samra, Maral Tulip, Emma Kosh, Anthony Devine, Lynsey Ford, Martin Bell, Sahiba Chadha and formerly Dee Saigal, Sege Rosella and Olga Skumial. The series is similar to DIY SOS and Grand Designs, with the help of expert designers and builders and the youngsters themselves, the Dengineers team will then construct an extraordinary den, either completely from scratch or by transforming an existing room in the home. Each episode is themed, with designs such as an old-fashioned railway station, a 1960s American diner and an Australian outback shack.

In the United States, the series aired from January 3 to January 31, 2017 on Discovery Family. As of 2021 Czech Television has licensed the first two seasons.

The show won the Factual Entertainment category at the British Academy Children's Awards in 2019.

== Production ==
The Dengineers was first announced on 16 December 2014, with other CBBC commissions for 2015. On 11 April 2015, it was announced that Mark Wright would host with then-future CBBC HQ host Lauren Layfield. On 7 July 2016, a second series was commissioned. On 11 April 2017, it was announced that Wright was set to leave and be replaced by Joe Tracini. In 2017, a special in partnership with Children in Need and Blue Peter aired with guests Naomi Wilkinson, Ayshah Tull, Katie Thistleton, Ben Shires, Rhys Stephenson and Hacker T. Dog.

== Episodes ==
Series	Episodes	Presenters	Originally released	
Series	Episodes	Presenters	First released	Last released
1	10	Lauren Layfield and Mark Wright	21 November 2015	30 January 2016
2	11	Lauren Layfield and Mark Wright	12 November 2016	11 February 2017
3	14	Lauren Layfield and Joe Tracini	4 November 2017	17 February 2018
4	14	Lauren Layfield and Joe Tracini	20 October 2018	2 December 2018
5	15	Meryl Fernandes and Joe Tracini	23 October 2019	29 February 2020
6	15	Meryl Fernandes and Joe Tracini	21 November 2021	6 March 2022
7	15	Meryl Fernandes and Joe Swash	24 October 2022	22 January 2023

=== Series 1 (2015–2016) ===
No.	Title	Original release date
1	"Survival Den"	21 November 2015
2	"Music Den"	28 November 2015
3	"Football Den"	5 December 2015
4	"Hawaiian Den"	12 December 2015
5	"Dance Den"	19 December 2015
6	"Kitchen Den"	2 January 2016
7	"Art Den"	9 January 2016
8	"Train Den"	16 January 2016
9	"Spy Den"	23 January 2016
10	"Community Den"	30 January 2016

=== Series 2 (2016–2017) ===
No.	Title	Original release date
1	"Highlights"	12 November 2016
2	"Community Den"	19 November 2016
3	"Bollywood Den"	26 November 2016
4	"Gingerbread Den"	3 December 2016
5	"Hollywood Cinema Den"	10 December 2016
6	"Adventure Den"	17 December 2016
7	"DJ Den"	7 January 2017
8	"Eco Den"	14 January 2017
9	"Plane Den"	21 January 2017
10	"Magical Library Den"	28 January 2017
11	"Journalism Den"	4 February 2017
12	"Highlights"	11 February 2017

=== Series 3 (2017–2018) ===
No.	Title	Original release date
1	"Revisits Episode 1"	4 November 2017
2	"Revisits Episode 2"	11 November 2017
3	"Observatory Den"	18 November 2017
4	"Rugby Den"	25 November 2017
5	"Community Den Special"	2 December 2017
6	"Marble Run Den"	9 December 2017
7	"Christmas Den"	16 December 2017
8	"Scottish Castle Den"	6 January 2018
9	"Martial Arts Den"	13 January 2018
10	"Turkish Den"	20 January 2018
11	"Witchcraft and Wizardry Den"	27 January 2018
12	"Sensory Den"	3 February 2018
13	"Sport Den"	10 February 2018
14	"Highlights Episode"	17 February 2018

=== Series 4 (2018) ===
No.	Title	Original release date
1	"Australia Den"	27 October 2018
2	"Queen Victoria Den"	28 October 2018
3	"Army Coding Den"	3 November 2018
4	"Sweetie Den"	4 November 2018
5	"Politics Den"	10 November 2018
6	"Cricket Den"	11 November 2018
7	"Sewing Den"	17 November 2018
8	"Farm Den"	18 November 2018
9	"Magic Den"	24 November 2018
10	"Cycling Den"	25 November 2018
11	"Community Den"	12 December 2018
12	"Highlights"	14 December 2018
13	"Revisits One"	20 October 2018
14	"Revisits Two"	21 October 2018

=== Series 5 (2019–2020) ===
No.	Title	Original release date
1	"The Black History Den"	19 October 2019
2	"Conservation Den"	16 November 2019
3	"Underwater Den"	23 November 2019
4	"Amazonian Den"	30 November 2019
5	"Chinchilla Den"	7 December 2019
6	"Opera House Den"	14 December 2019
7	"Japanese Den"	4 January 2020
8	"Crazy Golf Den"	11 January 2020
9	"Zen Den"	18 January 2020
10	"Funfair Den"	25 January 2020
11	"Board Games Den"	1 February 2020
12	"Bug Den"	8 February 2020
13	"Highlights"	15 February 2020
14	"Revisit 1"	22 February 2020
15	"Revisit 2"	29 February 2020

=== Series 6 (2021) ===
No.	Title	Original release date
1	"Hotel Den"	21 November 2021
2	"Doctor Who Den"	21 November 2021
3	"TV Show Den"	21 November 2021
4	"Bagpipe Den"	21 November 2021
5	"Weather Den"	21 November 2021
6	"Engineering Den"	21 November 2021
7	"Beach Den"	21 November 2021
8	"Illustration Den"	21 November 2021
9	"International Celebration Den"	21 November 2021
10	"Lucky Cat Den"	21 November 2021
11	"Ancient Egyptian Den"	21 November 2021
12	"Highlights"	21 November 2021

=== Series 7 (2022-2023) ===
No.	Title	Original release date
1	"Strictly Come Dancing Den"	24 October 2022
2	"Sausage Dog Den"	25 October 2022
3	"Optical Illusion Den"	26 October 2022
4	"Shakespeare Den"	27 October 2022
5	"Tap Dance Den"	28 October 2022
6	"Orangutan Den"	30 October 2022
7	"Science Den"	6 November 2022
8	"Rollercoaster Den"	13 November 2022
9	"Indian Retreat Den"	20 November 2022
10	"Football Den"	27 November 2022
11	"Crochet Den"	4 December 2022
12	"Submarine Den"	11 December 2022
13	"Highlights"	8 January 2023
14	"Revisits"	15 January 2023
15	"How to Be a DIY Dengineer"	22 January 2023
