= Simon Gleeson =

Australian actor and singer

- Born: Wagga Wagga
- Education: Xavier College; WAAPA
- Occupation(s): Actor, singer, songwriter
- Known for: Les Misérables, Love Never Dies

Simon Gleeson is an Australian actor, singer and screenwriter. He is best known for playing Raoul in the 2011 Australian production of Love Never Dies and Jean Valjean in the 2014 Australian revival of Les Misérables. He reprised the role of Valjean in the 2016/17 cast of the West End production. He released an album titled Elements in 2015 and was a co-writer of the 2024 film Better Man.

== Early life and education ==
Gleeson grew up in Wagga Wagga, New South Wales, with his parents and sister, who is an actress.

He completed his secondary education as a boarder at Xavier College in Melbourne.

Gleeson trained at the Western Australian Academy of Performing Arts (WAAPA).

== Career ==
Gleeson has performed in many musicals and plays in Australia and in London's West End including Mamma Mia!, Eureka, The Far Pavilions, and Imagine This. He has performed in plays for Sydney Theatre Company and Royal National Theatre in the UK. In 2013/2014 he was in the original company of Rupert for Melbourne Theatre Company and toured the play to the John F. Kennedy Center for the Performing Arts.

He portrayed Raoul in the Australian production of Andrew Lloyd Webber's musical Love Never Dies, the sequel to Lloyd Webber's highly successful The Phantom of the Opera.

Gleeson has appeared in numerous television series in Australia and the UK, most notably as Sid in EastEnders and as a principal cast member of 'Kombat Opera Presents' for BBC television. In the United Kingdom he has performed in plays at The Royal National Theatre and in the West End of London. He has appeared in the popular BBC soap opera EastEnders, playing SJ Fletcher's boyfriend Sid Clarke. In 2007 Gleeson appeared in 'Kombat Opera Presents' for BBC television. He appeared with Richard Dreyfuss and Nia Vardalos in 2009's My Life in Ruins.

In August 2012, he played Anatoly Sergievsky in an Australian production of Chess.

From 2014 Gleeson played Jean Valjean in the Australian tour of Cameron Macintosh's Les Miserables. He would remain with the cast throughout 2015 and was cast in the role for its Manila run. He won a Helpmann Award for the role. From December 2016 to June 2017, he played Valjean in the West End production of Les Misérables.

He performed in Noël Coward's Hayfever for the Melbourne Theatre Company, and returned to the Melbourne Theatre Company in 2018 to play Sir Robert Chiltern in Oscar Wilde's An Ideal Husband.

In 2018, Gleeson joined The Production Company for their production of Oklahoma! as Curly McLain alongside Anna O'Byrne.

== Music ==
Gleeson released his debut album, titled Elements in 2015. The track list consists of:

- "A Bit of Earth"
- "Anthem"
- "She’s Got A Way" / "Something"
- "End of The World"
- "Being Alive"
- "Bring Him Home"
- "And the Rain Keeps Falling Down"
- "Stay With Me"
- "Sorry Seems To Be the Hardest Word" – featuring Natalie O’Donnell
- "If I Loved You"
- "The Day You Went Away"

== Nominations and awards ==
In 2014, Gleeson was awarded a Helpmann Award for his role as Jean Valjean in the Australian tour of Les Miserables. He has been nominated for a Helpmann Award twice before for Sky in Mamma Mia!, and Raoul in Love Never Dies and has been nominated several times for a Green Room Award.

In London he was nominated for a Whatsonstage.com Award for The Far Pavilions. Gleeson has also been nominated for a Glugs Award.
