= OCD Awareness Week =

Annual observance in October about OCD Awareness

OCD Awareness Week is observed in October. It was launched in 2009 by the International OCD Foundation and has taken place every October since. It is an international effort to support those with obsessive–compulsive disorder (OCD) and support people who have the mental health condition. Celebrities have often discussed their experiences with the condition during OCD Awareness Week.

== Overview and history ==
"OCD Awareness Week (#OCDweek) is a worldwide event that serves to dispel myths about obsessive compulsive disorder, break the stigma around mental illness, and provide education about the disorder and how to support those affected. For the over 200 million people worldwide living with OCD, public misconception can prevent them from accessing the timely, effective treatment they need to move from suffering to thriving."

— Part of the International OCD Foundation's description of OCD Awareness Week (2024).

OCD Awareness Week was launched in 2009 by the International OCD Foundation. Its goal is an international effort to raise awareness and understanding about obsessive–compulsive disorder (OCD) and related disorders and to help get more people access to treatment for the condition. It takes place in the second week of October each year. It is organised by mental health organisations, clinicians, activists and advocacy groups, who share educational resources and host events during the week, as well as promoting the stories of those with OCD in order to reduce the stigma. The International OCD Foundation includes resources to help people educate themselves, access resources, sharing information on social media and contacting elected officials about OCD.

In 2014, Welsh actor Ian Puleston-Davies spoke about his experience with the condition in The Daily Telegraph. In 2015, Good Morning Britain marked OCD Awareness Week with a segment discussing the disorder; however, this was criticised by Rose Bretécher from The Guardian for "ignoring the less 'vanilla' aspects of the condition" and overstepping other symptoms, which she believed could did a "disservice" to viewers with the condition who have "violent and disturbing thoughts". In 2016, English television personality Mark Wright appeared on This Morning to talk about his experience with Symmetry OCD as part of the 2016 OCD Awareness Week. During OCD Awareness Week 2019, OCD UK released a different released content on their website focussing on myths and misconceptions about the condition.

== Aims ==
The week's main aim is to raise awareness regarding obsessive–compulsive disorder and to support people affected by it. According to Awareness Days UK, the week also aims to "dispel myths, educate the public about OCD, and promote understanding and empathy for individuals" living with OCD, as well as highlighting the "importance of early diagnosis, effective treatment, and the need for ongoing support for those managing OCD". Matthew Antonelli from the International OCD Foundation explained that the week's aim to spread awareness is aiming to share "greater understanding" and eliminate stigma. It also aims to challenge and change inaccurate perceptions around the mental health condition.

== Themes ==
- 2023 – OCD Truths, which aims to highlight the realities of living with OCD and the hope of treatment for it.
