= SJ Fletcher =

Fictional EastEnders character

- EastEnders character
- Portrayed by: Natasha Beaumont
- First appearance: Episode 3170/3171; 16 June 2006
- Last appearance: Episode 3238; 12 October 2006
- Introduced by: Kate Harwood
In-universe information
- Occupation: Dancer; Stripper
- First cousins: Anne Fletcher
- Other relatives: Jackie Fletcher; Zoe Fletcher

Sarah Jane "SJ" Fletcher is a fictional character from the BBC soap opera EastEnders, portrayed by Natasha Beaumont. She made her first appearance on 16 June 2006. Beaumont was excited to join EastEnders as she had been a fan of the soap opera when she arrived to the UK. SJ was introduced as an Australian stripper who is looking for a place to stay, and she catches the eye of Minty Peterson (Cliff Parisi), who becomes infatuated with her. SJ then uses Minty for money for months and this causes him to neglect other factors in his life. SJ's on-off boyfriend from her past, Sid Clarke (Simon Gleeson), was introduced during her stint, and the pair pretend they are siblings and scheme to take more money from Minty. Beaumont did not believe that SJ was a completely bad person as she believed that she was just used to getting her own way and does not see what she is doing as completely wrong. Beaumont made her final appearance as SJ on 12 October 2006; in the storyline, SJ and Sid leave after Minty discovers them in bed together. Beaumont enjoyed her time in the soap and wanted to portray another villain in another soap opera. SJ's behaviour led to a fan shouting at Beaumont in the street. Critics criticised SJ for her treatment of Minty and characterised her as sly, shameless and a schemer, although several critics also criticised Minty for falling for her schemes.

== Casting ==
"Australian SJ knows how to pull a man's strings. All it takes is a flick of her blonde hair and a wink of her eye. Armed with this piece of knowledge, SJ's found that it's a pretty easy life."

— SJ's official BBC profile

In April 2006, it was reported that Natasha Beaumont had been cast on EastEnders to portray Sarah-Jane, also known as SJ. Kris Green from Digital Spy teased that SJ would "cause a stir" in the soap. Beaumont was excited to join the soap as she had been "addicted" to watching it since she had moved to the UK. She added that she could not wait to "whip the Walford men into a frenzy". SJ was characterised as being Australian, having moved to the United Kingdom a few years prior to her debut after securing a job in a Gentlemen's club. In the character's debut storyline, SJ is looking for a new place to live due to her landlord selling her home, and she bumps into established EastEnders characters when she is booked in as a stripper at the local nightclub, Scarlet. It was teased that it would not be "long" until Scarlet would get involved with "one of the lucky men in Walford". SJ is an exotic dancer and a stripper and Beaumont took a pole dancing class in order to prepare for SJ's stripping scenes. Beaumont revealed that fellow cast member June Brown, who played Dot Cotton, taught her how to walk in high heels after telling her that was not "holding" herself in enough of a "ladylike fashion".

== Development ==
SJ made her first appearance on 16 June 2006. Her debut scenes involve her meeting Minty Peterson (Cliff Parisi), who helps her with her flat tire after she breaks down in Walford. She takes a liking to him and he does not charge her, and whilst he gets to know her he finds out that she is looking for a place to stay. She ends up talking Minty into giving her a place to stay. Garry Hobbs (Ricky Groves), Minty's best friend, becomes annoyed when Minty moves SJ into their flat. Garry causes trouble for their fling when he believes that SJ has stolen Minty's watch. Minty ends up falling for SJ, but she is using him to get money. She becomes the "apple" of his eye and his life goes in a "downward spiral" since meeting her. Garry continues to not like SJ as he is convinced that she is taking advantage of him. SJ later causes further issues for Garry and Minty's friendship with her "drunken antics" when she tries to find out what Phil Mitchell (Steve McFadden) is wearing "under his kilt". Beaumont's friends wanted SJ to have an affair with a man from the Mitchell family.

When SJ is about to leave Walford, Minty is desperate for her to stay and pays for a bedsit for her. SJ continues to use Minty for money and it becomes clear to the other characters that Minty is being taken for a fool. Beaumont explained that SJ is not physically attracted to Minty, but he emotionally makes her feel like no other man has and she likes him as just a friend. The actress added that SJ is the type of woman who is "used to having a guy around to bail her out". Beaumont also believed that Minty was a bit of a saviour for SJ, and that SJ has a "kernel of innocence to her" and thus there is a similarity between them. Beaumont believed that SJ is not an "out-and-out bitch", but would have "loved it" if she was. The actress admitted that she had hoped to play a "full-on vixen". The actress was confused as to why SJ did not find someone richer to take money from, and believed that SJ was not well-informed about money, adding that whilst SJ can be "manipulative" and used to getting her own way, she did not believe that the character would not set out to take all the money off someone. Beaumont hoped that SJ would not put Minty off woman "for life", adding "strippers maybe, but not women in general!" Beaumont also expressed sympathy for "adorable" Minty and believed that what SJ is doing to him is "awful". The actress revealed that she was "shocked" by the development in SJ's storylines, and believed and hoped that SJ had more secrets and "skeletons in her cupboard".

EastEnders later introduced Sid Clarke (Simon Gleeson) as someone from SJ's past. SJ claims that Sid is her brother, but he is actually an old friend of hers from when they were children and her former boyfriend; Beaumont called Sid an Australian "drifter" who comes "in and out" of SJ's life, and he is usually after money and a place to stay. Beaumont teased that Sid and SJ still get intimate together and would do so behind Minty's back. SJ ends up standing Minty up when he sets up the flat with candles to set up the mood; when she does not turn up, he goes to her flat and is shocked to see her with Sid, who is naked on her sofa. SJ talks her way out of the situation by claiming that Sid was mugged and that he is her brother and shows him pictures of them when they were children. Minty believes SJ's lie that he is her brother and apologises and is unaware that Sid is the man in SJ's life. Beaumont explained that Minty does not have a reason to believe that SJ is lying, but Garry remains convinced that something is dodgy about Sid. Beaumont clarified that SJ is not honest about who Sid is as she is still trying to use Minty for his money, and she does not feel guilty for using him as it is how SJ gets through life, adding that SJ "travels around, dances a bit and uses men". Beaumont revealed that SJ does not realise that what she is doing is wrong as she is the sort of woman who will do "anything" to keep things "afloat". After Minty leaves, Sid tells SJ that he is glad they are not related and they kiss. Discussing Sid and SJ's relationship, Beaumont told Inside Soap that she does not believe that SJ trusts herself to "run her own life", and that she is the type of woman to attract a man like Sid. Beaumont added that Sid is also the link to SJ's family and her life before she started work as a stripper. Beaumont believed that another character would see Sid and SJ together and realise they are not related, adding that something "has to give" and that SJ would get found out. Beaumont also believed that SJ's storyline with Minty would have been different if Sid had not been introduced.

SJ later cons Minty into buying her a lot of drinks, and although he does this, he soon realises that she is taking advantage. With Minty realising that Sid is not serious about him, Sid threatens to leave her unless she secures the cash by "any means", prompting her to have sex with Minty in order to take more of his money. Beaumont explained that when Minty tells SJ that he loves her, "she does what she has to" and has sex with him as she realises that it is her chance to win him over. The next morning, Minty asks SJ to stay with him rather than go to work and offers to pay for her time, which Beaumont compared to Pretty Woman. Minty also tells her that he loves her and wants to be her boyfriend, and she kisses him. When Minty makes her breakfast the next day, he finds out that she has scarpered. Beaumont teased that there likely would not be a good outcome for SJ and Minty. Minty later gives the last amount of money he has to SJ despite being in his "last chance saloon" with his boss, friends, bank manager and landlord. SJ claims that she needs the money buy a dress for an audition, but she actually gives the money to Sid, who Beaumont described as a "lowlife".

Garry then sees SJ and Sid kiss in the street, blowing their scam. Garry tells the news to Minty, who is hoping that Minty has made a mistake as he had been considering proposing to SJ. Minty then finds SJ and Sid in bed when he goes to confront at the flat. With Minty having found that she has been using him and her plan exposed, she and Sid leave Walford as there is now nothing keeping them there. Beaumont believed that SJ's friendship with Minty had "opened her eyes" to the way things could be with another man, and that SJ has become very unhappy with Sid by the time that they leave. SJ's final appearance on 12 October 2006. The end of Beaumont's stint had been reported before the airing of the episode. Following her departure from EastEnders, Beaumont take some time off working and told Inside Soap that she would love to portray a "superbitch" in another soap opera, although she was initially unsure if she was allowed to be in another soap after being in one already. The actress hoped to stay in touch with Parisi, calling him a "wicked guy". Beaumont said that she would love to SJ to return to EastEnders pregnant with Minty's child so that he would "make an honest woman" out of her. There were rumours that SJ would return in June 2007 in a storyline that would reveal her to pregnant with Minty's child; however, an Eastenders spokesperson told Digital Spy that there was not the case and there were no plans for SJ to return.

== Storylines ==
SJ arrives in Walford when her car tire deflates. She received help from mechanic Minty Peterson (Cliff Parisi) and she takes him to lunch to thank him for fixing the tyre, where she claims to have forgotten her purse. Minty and his flatmate Garry Hobbs (Ricky Groves) later see SJ working as a stripper in the Scarlet nightclub. When SJ tells them that she is looking for somewhere to live, Minty allows SJ to move in with them, although Garry does not trust SJ and does not want her to stay permanently. Garry begins to dislike SJ as he feels pushed out by Minty, who really likes SJ even though she does not contribute financially much to the flat. SJ is very excited when Minty invites her to join their 2006 FIFA World Cup holiday trip to Germany, but she decides to not go when she sees that it has caused arguments between Garry and Minty. She is then asked to leave the flat and moves away.

SJ returns and begins renting her own flat in Walford. Garry becomes angry that SJ is manipulating Minty into paying for her rent, food and drinks and regularly taking her out for dinner and giving her money. Garry suspects that SJ is using Minty and is having sex with Australian visitor Sid Clarke (Simon Gleeson), but SJ denies this and claims that Sid is her brother, even giving fake photographic evidence. Minty believes her but it is revealed that SJ was lying and that Sid is her ex-boyfriend and sexual partner. As part of her plan with Sid, SJ continues to flirt with Minty to keep him keen on her so they can continue getting his money. Minty continues to give SJ money as he believes that there is a possibility of a relationship between them. However, one night he gets tired at SJ using him for drinks and shouts at her in The Queen Victoria pub. SJ changes tactics and pretends to start a relationship with Minty even though she is still with Sid. Minty is delighted and loses his job and friendship with Garry, whilst SJ uses the money that he has left. SJ begins to feel guilty after months of using Minty and tells Sid that she cares for Minty and wants to stop, but Sid does not want to lose the potential money. SJ tries to convince Sid to move to Australia with her to have a baby, and although he initially refuses, they end up having sex when she is meant to meet Minty. After a tip-off from Garry, Minty finds SJ and Sid in bed together, and the next day he discovers that the pair have fled Walford.

== Reception ==
Prior to the character's debut, Kris Green from Digital Spy believed that the man to become romantically involved with SJ would be "lucky". A writer from the BBC believed that SJ's high point was getting Minty to give her somewhere to stay and her low point was having to leave after her scheme was discovered. The writer also speculated that SJ's presence might "put some female noses out of joint". The South Wales Argus chose SJ's debut and the episode where she is accused of stealing Garry's watch as part of their TV highlights feature, whilst the Irish Independent chose the latter episode as their pick of the day feature. In December 2006, a writer from The Kerryman called SJ a "schemer" who manipulated the "gullible" Minty into paying for her. A writer from the same newspaper also believed that SJ was "rather too obsessed" with finding out what Phil "may or may not be wearing under his kilt". A writer from the Gorey Guardian called SJ "seductive" and noted that "hapless" Minty had been "suckered in" by her again into paying for her dress.

In July 2006, Terry Ramsey from the Evening Standard had previously called Minty "deluded" for paying for SJ's bedsit in July 2006. A writer from the same newspaper wrote that Minty had a "hole" between his ears as he was still being conned by SJ. The following month, a writer from the same newspaper called SJ "duplicitous" and criticised Minty for being "taken for a mug" and buying her a lot of drinks. The Evening Standard also opined that it was unfortunate that Minty was being "sucked in" by SJ. Kate Woodward from Inside Soap called SJ a "soap superbitch" who had "wily ways" and was set to break the heart of "lovable" Minty, adding that she was leading Minty up the "garden path". Woodward also called SJ "sly" and noted that she tried to seduce Minty to achieve her "evil ends" and that she had become "increasingly shameless" in manipulating him. Woodward speculated that Beaumont could "incur the wrath" of fans due to SJ's behaviour. Beaumont revealed that a viewer shouted "SJ, you're a bitch!" to her when she was walking down the street, though she did not respond and kept her head down. Woodward later wrote that she was not surprised that "smitten" Minty had "homed in" on SJ due to his "drought of women" and due to the fact that she had hung out with him and even had sex with him. She also called SJ an "Aussie tart" that had made Minty "penniless".
