= Amigos (play) =

2004 Australian play by David Williamson

- Author: David Williamson
- Cover artist: Cover design by Kate Florance. Front cover shows Gary Day as Jim and Tony Llewellyn-Jones as Dick in the 2004 Sydney Theatre Company production. Photo: Tracey Schramm
- Language: English
- Genre: Play
- Publisher: Currency Press
- Publication date: 2004
- Publication place: Australia
- Media type: Print (Paperback)
- ISBN: 978-0-86819-746-3

Amigos is a 2004 play by the Australian playwright David Williamson, published by Currency Press in 2004, which premiered with the Sydney Theatre Company.

== First production ==
Amigos was first produced by Sydney Theatre Company at the Drama Theatre, Sydney Opera House, on 8 April 2004, with the following cast:

- Jim: Gary Day
- Dick: Tony Llewellyn-Jones
- Stephen: Garry McDonald
- Hilary: Wendy Hughes
- Sophie: Natasha Elisabeth Beaumont
- Director: Jennifer Flowers
- Set designer: Michael Scott-Mitchell
- Costume designer: Fiona Crombie
- Lighting designer: David Walters
- Composer: Paul Charlier
