= The Gender Trust =

British charity

- Established: 19 February 1990
- Type: Transgender rights
- Location: United Kingdom
- Region served: United Kingdom
- Official language: English

The Gender Trust is a United Kingdom charitable organisation promoting public education about transgender and gender identity issues and providing information to those affected. It was established in 1990. It is based in Horsham and Henfield, West Sussex. Gender Trust spokesmen comment on occasion to the news about transsexualism. For example, when the 2004 Big Brother winner was a transsexual, a GenderTrust spokesman said of the program: "It's raised the general public's awareness that transsexuals are just ordinary people." It has criticised employers for rarely thinking about the need for sex change or of the difficulty of sex change operations on their employees.

In 1997, The Gender Trust was one of the 65 groups awarded money grants by the National Lottery Charities Board. In 2003, The Gender Trust was one of the many UK support groups suggested for intersex persons and people with gender identity problems. In 2007, an advice panel suggested Gender Trust as one of several professional organisations from which a person troubled with gender identity issues can seek guidance.

== See also ==
- Transgender rights in the United Kingdom
