= Emily Scott (DJ) =

Australian model (born 1983)

- Born: 1983 (age 42–43)
- Origin: Australia
- Genres: House, dance
- Occupations: Model, DJ, producer
- Labels: Neon Underground; Vacation; Stealth/Picante; Definitive
- Spouse: Ritchie Neville (m. 2008; sep. 2009)

Emily Scott (born 1983) is an Australian model, DJ, record producer, and television personality.

== Career ==
She appeared in the visuals of Robbie Williams' spring 2006 tour, and in a remake of the "Rock DJ" music video. She was the face of Lipton Ice Tea. In 2006, she was in the ITV reality series Love Island.

As a DJ she tours Europe, Australia and Asia. Scott mixed a compilation CD called Clublife for Central Station, which is available on iTunes. She has supported fellow DJ Erick Morillo. She also appeared on the TLC show London Ink, where she got a Koi fish tattoo on her right arm.

In the autumn of 2007 Scott was in the second BOB series of Cirque de Celebrité on Sky One in the United Kingdom. Later that year, she was voted the 9th Sexiest Woman in the World by FHM.

Scott joined the cast of Australian Dancing with the Stars in July 2009. She was eliminated on 26 July 2009.

On 18 November 2011 (Day 5), Scott joined Series 11 of I'm a Celebrity... Get Me Out of Here!. She replaced Freddie Starr. She was voted out on 29 November 2011 (Day 16).

== In popular culture ==
In 2009, Swedish indie band Light In Your Life released a song, "Emily Scott", named after her.

== Personal life ==
She married fellow Cirque de Celebrite contestant and ex-Five member, Ritchie Neville in Henley-on-Thames on 23 October 2008. The couple moved to Sydney, Australia following their wedding however, they separated four months later.

== Discography ==
2010 - Cortado (Original Mix) - Neon Underground - 2010
2010 - But Enough About Me (Emily Scott Remix) - Bass Kleph - Vacation Records
2010 - The Time Is Now (Original Mix) - Stealth / Picante
2011 - Rock Organ (Emily Scott Remix) - fRew - fRewition - 2011
2011 - Long Black (Original Mix) - Definitive
2011 - Bom Bao (Original Mix) - Definitive
2012 - NOW Dance 2012 - EMI / Warner Music - 2011/12
