= Joe Tracini =

English actor, television presenter and author

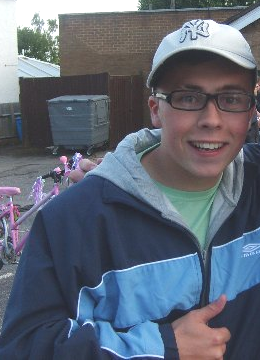
- Joe Tracini in his Coming of Age costume in 2010
- Born: Joe James Pasquale; 19 July 1988 (age 38); Great Yarmouth, Norfolk, England
- Education: Italia Conti Academy of Theatre Arts
- Years active: 2005–present
- Television: My Spy Family (2007–2010); Coming of Age (2008–2011); Hollyoaks (2011–2014, 2018); The Dengineers (2017–2022)
- Parents: Joe Pasquale (father); Debbie Pasquale (mother)

Joe Tracini (born Joe James Pasquale; 19 July 1988) is an English actor, presenter and author. He appeared in the role of Dennis Savage in the Channel 4 soap opera Hollyoaks. His previous TV acting credits have included the BBC Three comedy series Coming of Age and the Boomerang children's sitcom My Spy Family. His theatre credits include Spamalot, starring in the role of Patsy during a touring version of the production in 2015. In 2022, he published his first book, Ten Things I Hate About Me.

== Early life ==
Joe Tracini was born in Great Yarmouth, Norfolk, the son of comedian Joe Pasquale and his second wife, Debbie Pasquale. The family subsequently moved to Kent and Joe was brought up in Higham, near Rochester. He was educated at King's School, Rochester and the Rochester Independent College. Having finished school, Tracini joined the Italia Conti Academy of Theatre Arts in London where he completed a National Diploma in Performing Arts in early 2007. As well as being an actor, Tracini also trained as a magician, having taken an interest in magic at the age of two. In 2003, he received the title of ‘British Junior Magical Champion’ which he won at the Blackpool Opera House in front of 3,000 international magicians. At the same time he also won the title of ‘Most Promising Comedy Act of 2003’, chosen and presented by Ken Dodd, as well as coming third in The Magic Circle's 'Young Magician Of The Year' competition.

== Acting career ==
=== Theatre ===
Tracini's first theatre appearance came in a Christmas 2005 pantomime version of Snow White and the Seven Dwarfs at the Cliffs Pavilion in Southend. The following year, having started his studies at the Italia Conti Academy of Theatre Arts, he went on to perform in a number of their in-house productions including A Chorus Line and Sexual Perversity in Chicago, as well as a tour version of Richard III, in which he portrayed the title character. In 2007, he returned to the pantomime stage to take on the title role in Peter Pan at the Churchill Theatre in Bromley. A year later he reprised the role, this time at the Beck Theatre in Hayes alongside Leslie Grantham in the role of Captain Hook. By 2009, despite a heavy filming schedule with Coming of Age and My Spy Family, he once again returned to the stage to take on the role of Buttons in Cinderella at The Hawth in Crawley where he received rave reviews from the local media.

Having taken a year off in 2010, he returned to pantomime in 2011 playing the role of Wishee Washee in Aladdin alongside Larry Lamb at the Ashcroft Theatre in Croydon. The following year, Tracini returned to the role of Buttons, this time at the Barbican Centre in York alongside his close friend Dani Harmer and ex-EastEnders star Joe Swash. Due to his filming schedule for Hollyoaks, he again took a break from the pantomime stage in 2013, however having completed his work with the soap, he returned to the stage in November 2014, once again reprising the role of Buttons in Cinderella at Wolverhampton's Grand Theatre alongside Julian Clary and The X Factor (UK series 4) star Niki Evans. In early April 2015, it was confirmed that Tracini would be taking over from Todd Carty in the role of Patsy in the UK tour of Spamalot. The musical's cast already included his father, Joe Pasquale, who had extended his run starring as King Arthur.

Year	Title	Role	Company	Theatre
2005–2006	Snow White and the Seven Dwarfs	Drummer Boy	Qdos Christmas Panto	Cliffs Pavilion, Southend
2006	A Chorus Line	Ensemble	Italia Conti Production	Avondale Theatre, Clapham
2006	Sexual Perversity in Chicago	Danny Shapiro	Italia Conti Production	Landor Theatre, Clapham
2006	Richard III	Richard III	Complete Works Production	Tour
2007–2008	Peter Pan	Peter Pan	First Family Entertainment Panto	Churchill Theatre, Bromley
2008–2009	Peter Pan	Peter Pan	Qdos Christmas Panto	Beck Theatre, Hayes
2009–2010	Cinderella	Buttons	Qdos Christmas Panto	The Hawth, Crawley
2011–2012	Aladdin	Wishee Washee	Evolution Pantomimes	Ashcroft Theatre, Croydon
2012	Cinderella	Buttons	Blue Genie Entertainment	Barbican Centre, York
2014–2015	Cinderella	Buttons	Qdos Christmas Panto	Grand Theatre, Wolverhampton
2015	Spamalot	Patsy	Ambassador Theatre Group	Tour
2019–2020	Cinderella	Buttons	Norwich Theatre Productions	Theatre Royal, Norwich, Norfolk
2020–2021	Damian's Pop Up Panto	Billy	Evolution Productions	Crucible Theatre, Sheffield
2021–2022	Dick Whittington and His Cat	Tommy the Cat	Norwich Theatre Productions	Theatre Royal, Norwich, Norfolk
2022–2023	Jack and the Beanstalk	Jack	Norwich Theatre Productions	Theatre Royal, Norwich, Norfolk
2023–2024	Sleeping Beauty	The Good Fairy	Norwich Theatre Productions	Theatre Royal, Norwich, Norfolk
2024–2025	Aladdin	Aladdin's Brother Reg	Norwich Theatre Productions	Theatre Royal, Norwich, Norfolk
2025–2026	Cinderella	Buttons	Norwich Theatre Productions	Theatre Royal, Norwich, Norfolk
2026–2027	Peter Pan	Mr. Smee	Norwich Theatre Productions	Theatre Royal, Norwich, Norfolk

=== Television ===
His television career started in 2004 when he was a guest on CITV STEM show Prove It!. He fully made his television debut in 2007 as Spike Bannon in My Spy Family airing on Boomerang. Following the success of the first series, he would go on to reprise his role in both the second and third series before the show eventually ended in January 2010. In 2007, Tracini was also cast in the role of Darren 'DK' Karrimore in a pilot for the new BBC Three situation comedy Coming of Age. The first series, airing in 2008, was well received, enjoying an average weekly reach of 1.2 million. Subsequent second and third series followed, where Tracini continued to gain plaudits for his outlandish performances. In 2011, the decision was made to axe the show. In 2010, Tracini also played the role of Victor in the single series of the BBC Four comedy The Great Outdoors.

In August 2011, it was announced that Tracini would be joining the cast of long-running Channel 4 soap Hollyoaks in the role of Dennis Savage. Like Lee Hunter, Dennis was primarily intended to take on comedic storylines. His first appearance was broadcast on 11 November 2011. After only six months in the role, Tracini was nominated for Best Comedy Performance at the British Soap Awards 2012, but was beaten to the award by Coronation Street's Stephanie Cole. Later that year Tracini was nominated for "Funniest Male" at the Inside Soap Awards 2012, but missed out on that award too, being beaten by EastEnders's Ricky Norwood. For the following two years, Tracini was again nominated in the same category, but on both occasions lost out to Coronation Street's Simon Gregson. In April 2014, it was announced that he would be leaving the soap with his final scenes broadcast in November of that year. In total, he appeared in 165 episodes. He will return to Hollyoaks in August 2018 for a brief stint. From 2017 to present, Tracini hosts the CBBC DIY series The Dengineers with Lauren Layfield, he replaced Mark Wright in series 3.

Year	Title	Role	Network	Notes
2007–2010	My Spy Family	Spike Bannon	Boomerang	Series 1–3 (12 episodes)
2008–2011	Coming of Age	Darren 'DK' Karrimore	BBC Three	Series 1–3 (23 episodes)
2008	Bewitched	Milo	BBC	Pilot
2008	Two Pints of Lager and a Packet of Crisps	Darren 'DK' Karrimore	BBC Three	2009 Comic Relief Special "When Janet Met Michelle"
2010	The Great Outdoors	Victor	BBC Four	Series 1 (3 episodes)
2010	Inn Mates	Josh	BBC Three	Pilot
2011–2014, 2018	Hollyoaks	Dennis Savage	Channel 4	Serial Soap (165 episodes)
2017–2021	The Dengineers	Co-presenter	CBBC	Series 3-6 (57 episodes)
2017, 2018	Saturday Mash-Up!	Himself	CBBC	2 episode

=== Film ===
Away from television roles, he also played the title role in Roderick Fenske's short film Future Dave, and took on the role of Tony Blackburn alongside Keith Chegwin and Susannah Fielding in the British comedy horror film Kill Keith.

Year	Title	Role	Director	Notes
2010	Future Dave	Dave	Roderick Fenske	Short Film
2010	Kill Keith	Tony Blackburn	Andy Thompson	

== Book ==
Tracini's first book, Ten Things I Hate About Me, was first published in December 2022 by Trapeze. A memoir focusing on mental health, it was well received. The book discusses suicide and borderline personality disorder, using Tracini's trademark combination of humour and sincerity.

== Personal life ==
In 2019, Tracini revealed over X (then known as Twitter) that he had been struggling with addiction issues and had been diagnosed with borderline personality disorder.

For a period of time whilst filming Hollyoaks, Tracini lived with friend and then-co star Emmett J. Scanlan. Tracini has credited Scanlan with helping him through his addiction issues, and addressed Scanlan's support during his 2026 comedy tour 10 Things I Hate About Me.

Tracini has been in a long-term relationship with his partner and fellow pantomime star Holly Houseman since 2020. He revealed on his comedy tour that they began dating shortly before the 2020 lockdown, then spent the majority of the lockdown isolating at her place with her parents after the country went into lockdown whilst he was visiting her family.
