= Alison Burrows =

British actress

- Occupation: Actress
- Years active: 1994–present
- Television: Hollyoaks; Queer as Folk

Alison Burrows is a British actress. She played Sandra Docherty in the two seasons of Queer as Folk (1999–2000) and also portrayed Kathleen McQueen in a recurring capacity on the British soap opera Hollyoaks (2009–11, 2014) and its two spin-offs Hollyoaks Later (2009) and Hollyoaks: King of Hearts (2010). She has had other roles in soap operas Coronation Street, Emmerdale and Doctors. In addition, she has also appeared in various other television series, including Lovejoy (1994), A Prince Among Men (1998), That Peter Kay Thing (2000), Phoenix Nights (2001), Outlaws (2004), Shameless (2005), Boy Meets Girl (2009), In the Dark (2017), Girlfriends (2018) and Moving On (2021), in addition to films such as My Son the Fanatic (1997), the television adaptation of The Illustrated Mum (2003), the short film Groove on a Stanley Knife (1997) and the pilot Slaterwood (2008) as part of part of the show Comedy Lab.

== Career ==
Alison Burrows had a role in 1997 British movie My Son the Fanatic. That same year, she was one of the two starring actresses in the 1997 short Groove on a Stanley Knife. Between 1999 and 2000, Burrows played Sandra Docherty in the British television series Queer as Folk. Burrows appeared in the 2003 television adaptation of Jacqueline Wilson's The Illustrated Mum. In 2005, she guest-starred in the second episode of the television comedy show Shameless. In 2008, she portrayed various characters in the Channel 4 television sketch show pilot Slaterwood, part of the show Comedy Lab. Burrows has also had guest appearances on several other television series, including Lovejoy (1994), A Prince Among Men (1998), That Peter Kay Thing (2000), Phoenix Nights (2001), Outlaws (2004), Boy Meets Girl (2009) and Girlfriends.

In September 2009, it was announced that Burrows would be joining the cast of the British soap opera Hollyoaks as Kathleen McQueen, part of the established McQueen family. The introduction of the character had been announced earlier that year, although it had not been confirmed who would be would be portraying her. Burrows first appeared in an episode of the series 2 of the Hollyoaks spinoff Hollyoaks Later, originally broadcast on 30 September 2009, before debuting on the main show later in December of that year for a longer stint. She appeared for a two-month stint and departed in February 2010. Burrows later returned to Hollyoaks for another stint beginning in December 2010. Jorgie Porter, who portrays Kathleen's daughter Theresa McQueen, "loved" working with Burrows, telling Inside Soap, "The scenes we do together are so intense - I hope she stays at Hollyoaks for a lot longer this time". Burrows also portrayed Kathleen in the one-off late-night special episode Hollyoaks: King of Hearts which was broadcast on 15 December 2010. Burrows appeared for several stints on the soap in a recurring capacity. She later reprised the role for another guest stint beginning on 25 August 2014.

In December 2014, it was announced that Burrows had joined the cast of the soap opera Coronation Street as Arlene Tinker, the sister of established character Beth Tinker (Lisa George), for a guest stint which aired in early 2015. Burrows was cast alongside Juliette Kaplan (Agnes Tinker) and Kate Fitzgerald (Nancy Tinker), who played Arlene and Beth's grandmother and mother, respectively, to introduce Beth's family to the soap. Burrows later returned to the role in scenes that aired in 2018 and 2019 for storylines relating to her daughter, Sinead Tinker (Katie McGlynn). George noted on Twitter that she enjoyed working with Burrows. Burrows had previously appeared on Coronation Street prior to being cast as Arlene.

In 2017, Burrows appeared in two episodes of the British crime drama In the Dark. That same year, she guest-starred in an episode of the BBC soap opera Doctors, which was broadcast on 10 October 2017. In 2021, she appeared in an episode of the 12th series of Moving On. Burrows has also appeared in the films Some Kind of Life (1996), Flesh and Blood (2002), The Bad Mother's Handbook (2007) and Grow Your Own (2007), as well as the television shows Heartbeat, The Cops, Holby City, Peak Practice, The Bill, Nice Guy Eddie, The Royal, Bodies, Emmerdale and The Royal Today.

== Selected filmography ==
Year	Title	Role	Notes	Ref(s).
1994	Lovejoy	Hotel Receptionist	Guest role	
1997	My Son the Fanatic	Prostitute	Comedy drama film	
1997	Groove on a Stanley Knife	Tammy	Short film	
1998	A Prince Among Men	Fan	Guest role	
1999–2000	Queer as Folk	Sandra Docherty	Two seasons	
2000	That Peter Kay Thing	—N/a	Guest role	
2001	Phoenix Nights	Michelle Coffee	Guest role (Series 1, Episode 6)	
2003	The Illustrated Mum	Lizzie	Television film	
2004	Outlaws	Social Worker	Guest role	
2005	Shameless	TV Woman	Guest role (Series 1, episode 2)	
2008	Slaterwood	Various	Television pilot (part of Comedy Lab)	
2009	Boy Meets Girl	Female Customer	Guest role (Series 1, Episode 1)	
2009	Hollyoaks Later	Kathleen McQueen	1 episode (series 2)	
2009–11, 2014	Hollyoaks	Kathleen McQueen	Recurring role	
2010	Hollyoaks: King of Hearts	Kathleen McQueen	Late-night special	
2015, 2018–19	Coronation Street	Arlene Tinker	Guest role	
2017	In the Dark	Katie	Episodes 3 and 4	
2017	Doctors	Samantha Friend	1 episode ("False Positive")	
2018	Girlfriends	Veronica	Guest role	
2021	Moving On	Anne	Guest role (1 episode)	
