= Sean Kane =

Scottish actor

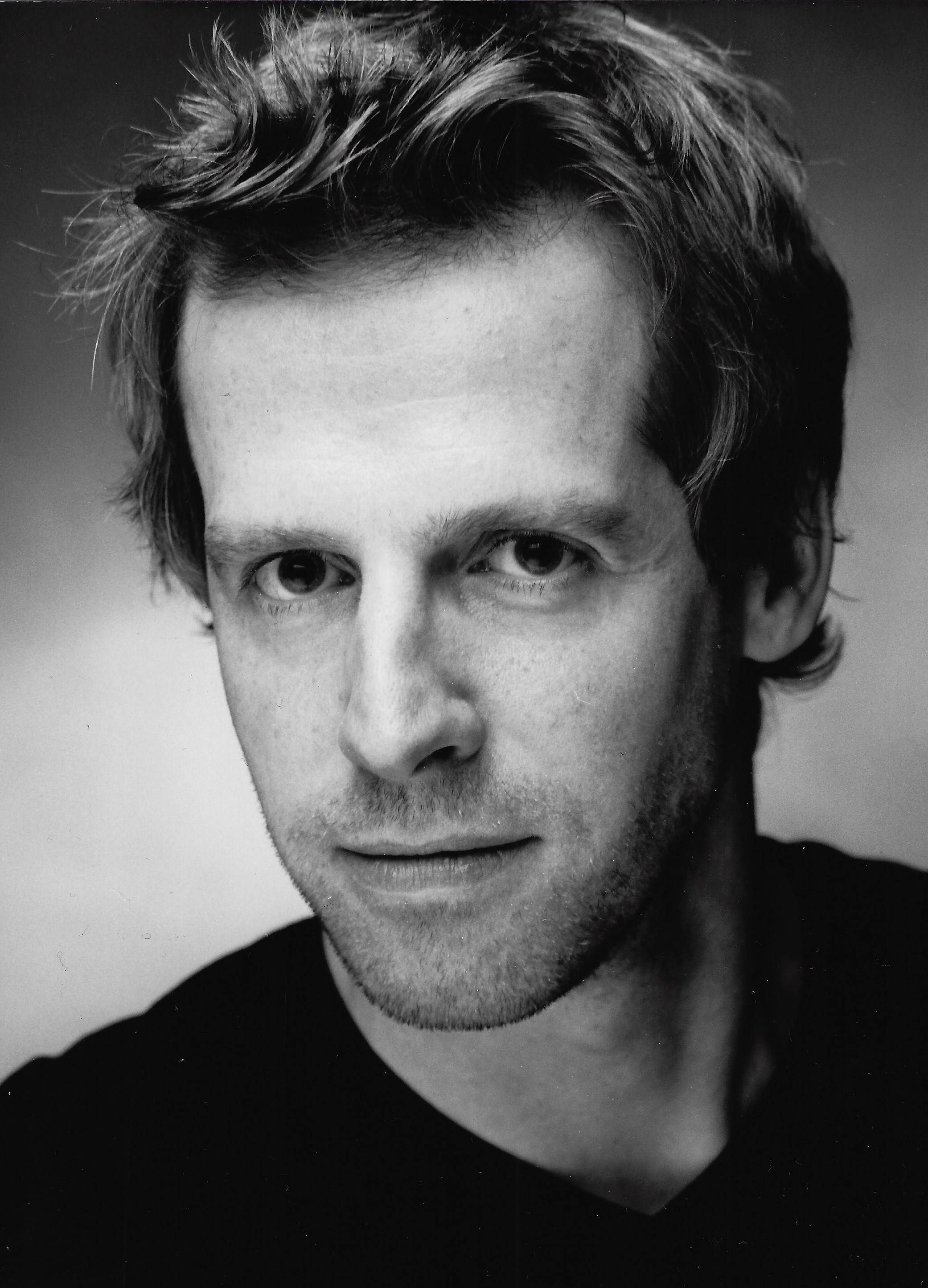
- Born: Peebles, Scotland
- Education: Queen Margaret University
- Occupations: Actor; director; presenter
- Years active: 1996–present

Sean Kane is a Scottish actor born in Peebles. He trained in Acting at Edinburgh’s Queen Margaret University from 1993-1996.

== Television and film ==
Sean appeared in the BBC drama The 39 Steps (2008 film) with Rupert Penry Jones and Eddie Marsan.

Sean was the featured lead in the short film The Inside Man winner at the 2005 SNOWYfest International Film Festival, Australia

He had a role in the 2005 film, Night People, which won the audience award at BAFTA Scotland.

Sean featured in the BBC soap River City playing doctor Colin Campbell.

Sean played George Heriot in the mini series King Jamie and the Angel produced by Caledonia, Sterne and Wyld broadcast on Channel 4 in 2002.

Sean played Sunny Jim in Para Handy in a new version, which was staged and filmed in front of a live audience at the Warehouse Theatre in Lossiemouth and is available on DVD.

Sean played Martin Mudie in the BBC programme 999 (British TV series)

Sean's first screen performance was in the short film Darkness in the Afternoon produced by Cormorant Films and won the 1999 Capalbio Cinema Award.

Sean was the presenter of the Kevin Keegan Soccer Circus football school in Glasgow.

Sean has featured in numerous TV commercials including McEwans Lager, Renault Scenic, Sterling Furniture, The Herald (Glasgow), Renault Scenic, HSBC Bank, Kwik Fit, Intelligent Finance, Education Scotland, Reid Furniture, and the Royal Bank of Scotland

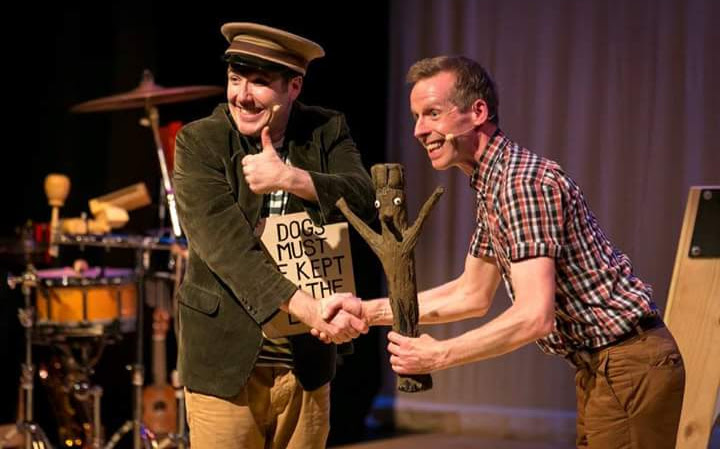
Stick Man, stage play by Julia Donaldson, Sydney Opera House 2016

== Theatre ==
In 2016 he played the title role in Stick Man by Julia Donaldson at Sydney Opera House.

Sean was one of the first Scottish actors to perform with Romanian actors at the Teatrul de Comedie in Bucharest, Romania in their production entitled Home in a co-production with Cumbernauld Theatre.

He played the title role of Macbeth in the world premiere of David Purves's Scots language translation of Shakespeare's play on the Edinburgh Festival Fringe, produced by Theatre Alba, directed by Charles Nowosielski.

In 2007, he performed in The Journey of Jeanie Deans by Judy Steel derived from The Heart of Midlothian by Walter Scott for Rowan Tree Theatre Company. This was the first theatrical play to be performed in the Scottish Parliament Building.

He played the role of Mark Renton in the stage premiere of Porno (novel) by Irvine Welsh.

Other Theatre credits include:

Macbeth and Peter Pan for the Royal Lyceum Theatre.

Dial M for Murder, The Mistress of the Inn by Carlo Goldoni and Run for Your Wife for Perth Theatre.

A Streetcar Named Desire and A Little Hotel on the Side for Pitlochry Festival Theatre.

Prince Charming and Dandini (character) in productions of Cinderella at Brunton Theatre and Carnegie Hall, Dunfermline.

The Scarecrow in The Wizard of Oz at the Macrobert Arts Centre

Abanazer in Aladdin at the Macrobert Arts Centre

== Company ==
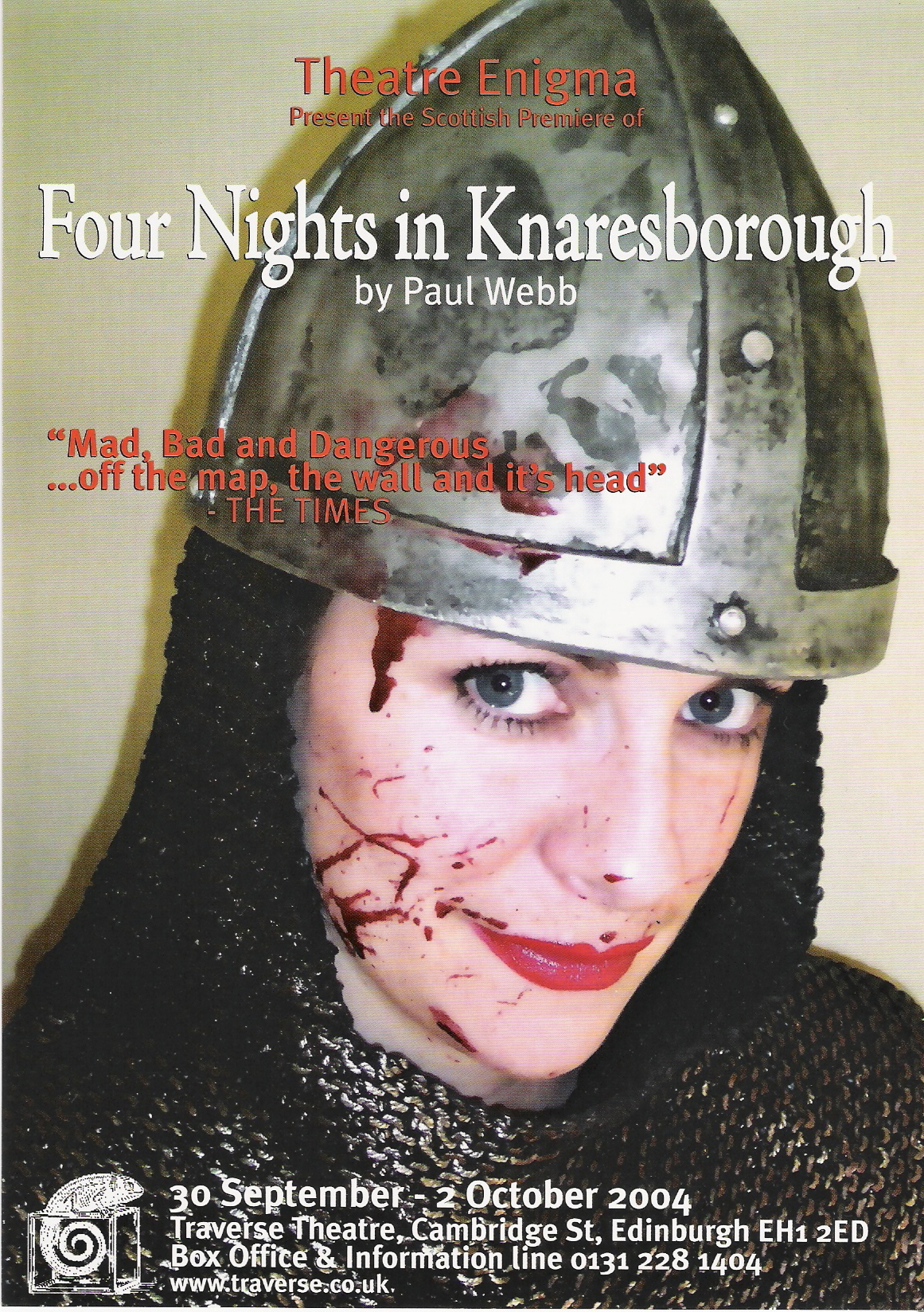

Sean is founder and director of the critically acclaimed company Theatre Enigma which to date has produced five productions, including 2 world premieres and 2 Scottish premieres:

Our Boys (1993 play) by Jonathan Guy Lewis which opened at the Netherbow Theatre now named the Scottish Storytelling Centre Edinburgh in 2002 and returned due to public demand in 2003.

Four Nights in Knaresborough by Paul Webb which premiered at the Traverse Theatre in 2004, directed by Sean Kane.

The Battle in the Hills / The Storm Watchers by George Mackay Brown which opened at the Scottish Storytelling Centre Edinburgh in 2006, directed by Sean Kane.

Sean directed Nancy Sleekit by Donald Campbell in a co-production (media) with Theatre Enigma and Rowan Tree Theatre for a Scottish Borders tour and at the Edinburgh Festival Fringe in 2009.

Starts with a Letter by Ian McMillan, Songs and Music by Carol Laula will have its stage premiere at the Beacon Arts Centre, Greenock, in November 2025. The production will then tour from Spring 2026.
