= Bambisanani Partnership =

UK–South African sport partnership

The Bambisanani Partnership
- Founded: 2006
- Founder: David Geldart
- Type: Charity
- Registration no.: 1163461 (England and Wales)
- Purpose: Leadership, Sport, Education, Sustainability and Cooperation
- Location(s): St. Mary's Menston, West Yorkshire, UK; Mnyakanya High School, Nkandla, Kwa Zulu Natal, South Africa
- Coordinates: 53°52′40″N 1°43′33″W
- Website: bambisananipartnership.org

The Bambisanani Partnership is a collaboration developed by St Mary's Menston Catholic Voluntary Academy in Menston in West Yorkshire, England and Mnyakanya School in Nkandla, KwaZulu-Natal, South Africa. "Bambisanani" is the Zulu word for "working hand in hand". The Bambisanani Partnership has used sport as a catalyst to develop international understanding, education, health and leadership. The initiative, which began in 2006, has gained both national and international acclaim. The University of Leeds, Leeds Trinity University and Newcastle College are now members of the partnership and like St. Mary's School regularly have students visit South Africa to extend its work. As of December 2025, the charity has engaged and connected 34,000 young people from both South Africa and the UK in its various programmes.

Mnyakanya High School in Nkandla serves one of KwaZulu-Natal's most deprived rural communities Mnyakanya High School was opened by Nelson Mandela and in 2004. The school serves a vast area and many students walk two hours to and from school each day. Mnyakanya has 850 students.

A fundamental aim of the partnership has been to create 'two way' learning between both countries with a focus on 'working together and learning together'. For example, the projects and programmes 'Leadership through Sport', 'Sports Festivals' 'Cycling to Success', 'Literacy through Sport', 'Numeracy through Sport', 'Art through Sport', 'Learning through Football' (Premier Skills), 'International Athletics Challenge' and the joint training of Physical Education teachers and Sports Coaches.

== History ==
=== 2006–2010 ===
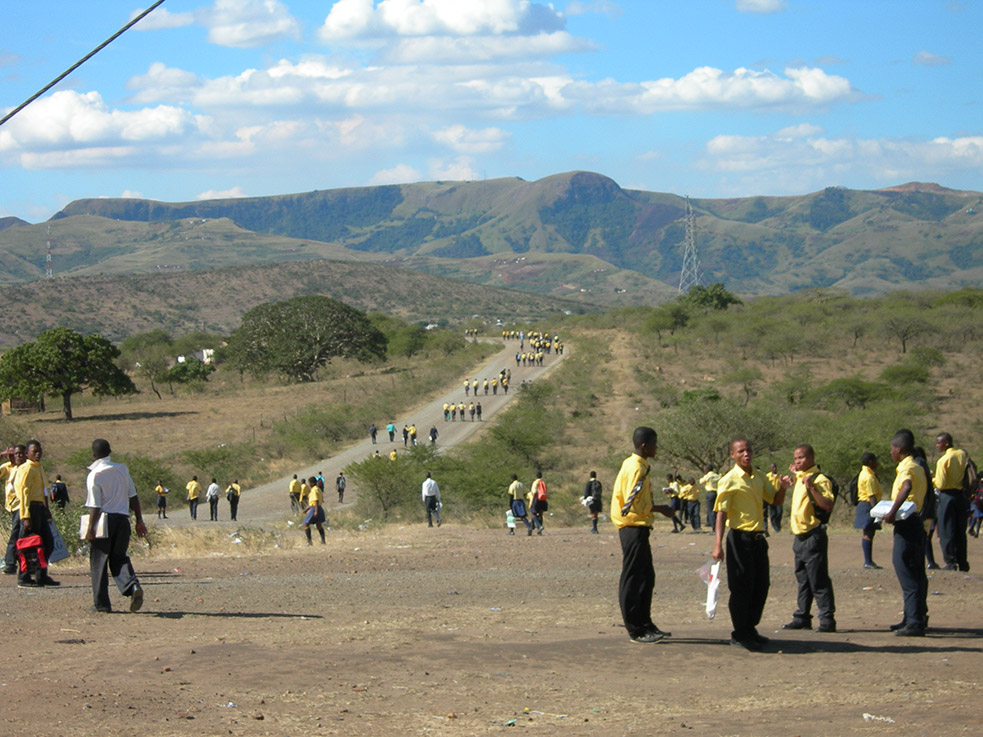
The road to Mnyakanya High School, Nkandla, KwaZulu-Natal, South Africa. Many pupils walk for several hours to school.

The Bambisanani Partnership began in 2006 when David Geldart, Assistant Headteacher at St. Mary's Catholic High School, Menston first visited Mnyakanya High School. In the same year Lucas Dube, Principal of Mnyakanya School visited St. Mary's School. Fundraising began in earnest to develop the partnership with support from members of the Kaiser Chiefs – former St. Mary's students.

In 2007, David Geldart returned to Mnyakanya with two Sixth form pupils. The purpose of the week-long visit was to develop the partnership and conduct joint leadership training with South African students, sport assistants, educators and volunteers.

In 2008, St. Mary's students and staff visited South Africa. Students from both Mnyakanya and St. Mary's worked collaboratively to plan and deliver a large community sports festival for primary school children. The festival was attended by Armichand Rajbansi, KZN Minister for Sport. The group were also visited by Ina Cronje, KZN Minister of Education who also visited St. Mary's School when visiting the UK in the same year.

In 2009,'Bambisanani Enterprises', a student led social enterprise was established in both St. Mary's and Mnyakanya High School to both develop entrepreneurial skills and raise funds for the partnership. For example, Zulu students produced and sourced local products, such as indigenous crafts to be sold in the UK. The work of Bambisanani Enterprises was highlighted by the Yorkshire Young People's Enterprise Forum. The 14 St. Mary's pupils who visited South Africa in March 2009 received the inaugural Certificate of Excellence Group Award from the Diana Award for their outstanding volunteering and leadership. The award was presented by Ester Rantzen CBE.

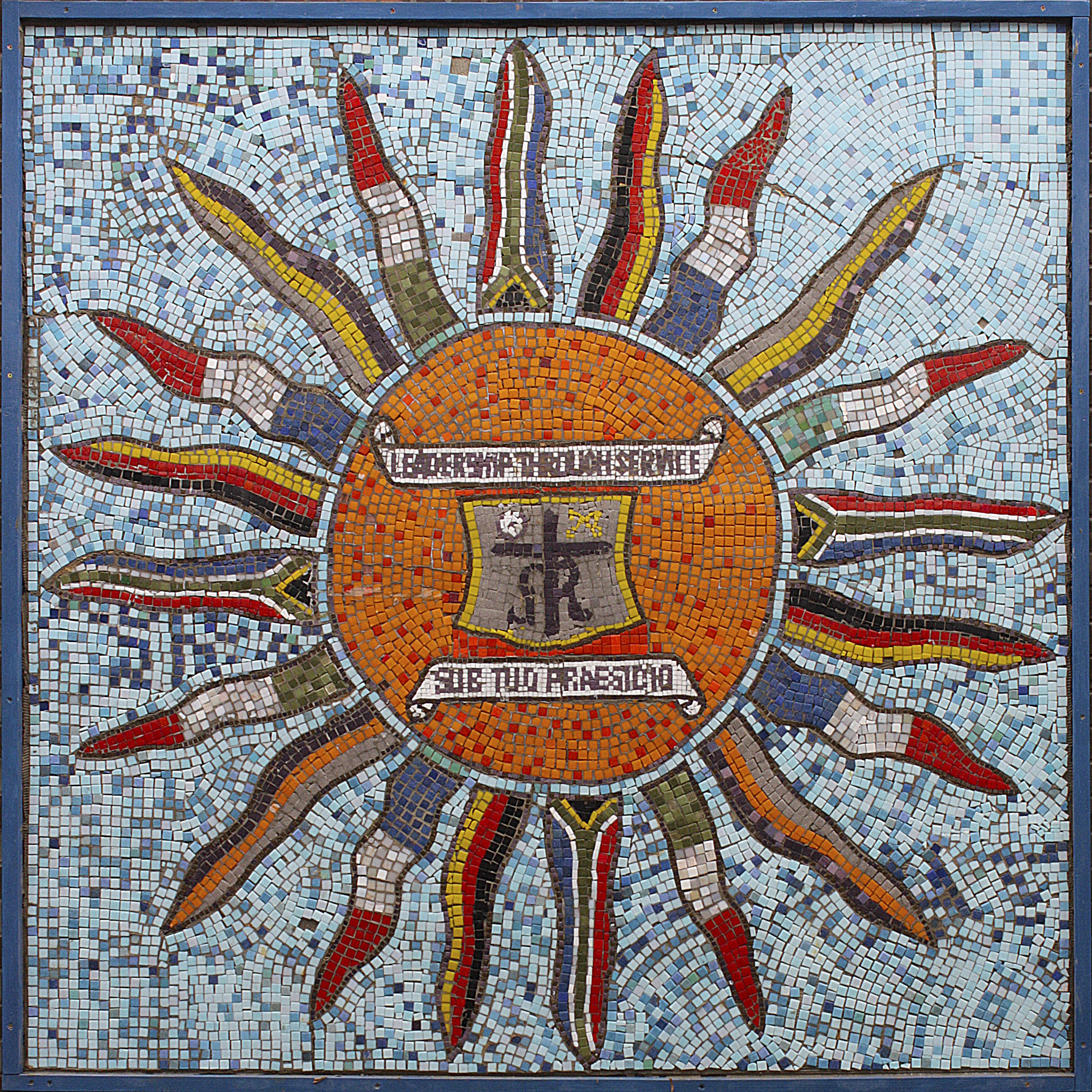
St. Mary's International Links mosaic, 2009

July 2009 saw the first visit by Mnyakanya pupils to the UK. During the visit, the fourteen Mnyakanya students worked with St. Mary's students on a variety educational sporting and cultural activities which included the creation of a mural to celebrate international co-operation. The group were special guests at both Leeds Rhinos and Yorkshire County Cricket Club fixtures and also participated in the annual St. Mary's Sports Day at South Leeds Stadium. Sally Bridgewater, a former pupil at St. Mary's who had visited South Africa organised a classical music concert to raise funds for the partnership. Music festivals have subsequently become annual events at St. Mary's to raise funds for and awareness of the partnership. In July 2009 David Geldart was invited to speak about the Bambisanani Partnership at a British Council Conference on Connecting Classrooms in Kenya. The work of The Bambisanani Partnership was celebrated later in the year when St. Mary's was awarded the Department of Education/British Council International School Award for excellence in the area of incorporating Global Citizenship as a key aspect of learning in the school. The award was presented by George Alagiah at a ceremony in London.

In 2010, Six educators from South Africa and Ghana visited St. Mary's as part of the British Council Connecting Classroom initiative. Later in the year, twelve students from St Mary's accompanied four members of staff on a visit to Kwa Zulu Natal to help organise and run several events, including a Sports Festival in collaboration with young leaders from Mnyakanya School. The Sports Festival included a football tournament involving over 200 students. Dr Nicola Brewer, British High Commissioner to South Africa and David Cordingley, Director of the British Council travelled from Johannesburg to see the Bambisanani programmes in action. The students from St. Mary's later received the Diana Certificate of Excellence for their work in South Africa and dedicated their award to Sbonelo Magwaza, a South African student they had worked with who had recently died. Both schools established a Sbonelo Magwaza Award for Outstanding Leadership that is presented annually. Former student and Bambisanani volunteer, Sally Bridgewater returned to South Africa on her own to teach Study Skills Leadership course to Mnyakanya students and was subsequently honoured in the national Young People of The Year Awards.

=== 2011–2015 ===
In 2011, David Geldart from St. Mary's and William Vilakazi from Mnyakanya gave a joint presentation at the Youth Sport Trust Sports College 'Achieving the Impossible' Conference. Senzo Mchunu, Minister for Education for Education for KwaZulu-Natal visited St. Mary's on a visit to the UK. Former West Ham United star, Trevor Brooking received the Bambisanani Partnership Award for his long-term support of the partnership. Fourteen St. Mary's pupils travelled to South Africa to engage in joint leadership training with students from Mnyakanya School and Eshowe High School. Students from all three schools worked together to plan and deliver both a Sports and Literacy Festival for four local primary schools. They also worked on art, creative writing and other sport projects. Twenty-four Mnyakanya and Eshowe students successfully completed the Bambisanani Leadership course and were awarded the Bambisanani Partnership Leadership Award Additionally the students also spent time working with the Norwegian-based charity Zulufadder. Zulufadder supports and cares for HIV/AIDS orphans and vulnerable children by providing schools, orphanages, homes, day care, food, clothing and educational resources. St. Mary's students brought a range of equipment for Zulufadder orphans and worked at the uMlalazi Day Centre and Crèche. St. Mary's students became the first in the country to receive the new International Diana Award for their outstanding work in South Africa developing the Bambisanani Partnership.

In 2012, a Bambisanani competition to celebrate the London 2012 Olympics and Paralympics called The Power Of Sport was held at both St. Mary's and Mnyakanya. The competition encompassed sport, creative writing and art. More than 600 students voluntarily participated in the competition. An Exhibition of the work was held in Leeds with art work being sold to support the work of the partnership. This Project inspired another Bambisanani book The Power of Sport – which featured the art and written work produced by the students. The Foreword for the book was written by artist [Harland Miller]. The first book published by the partnership Bambisanani: The First Five Years was featured in a talk at the Ilkley Literature Festival Fringe by David Geldart. The forward for the book was written by Baroness Sue Campbell. Fourteen students and three staff from St. Mary's School visited South Africa to develop the Bambisanani Partnership at Mnyakanya High School, Ntolwane Primary School and uMlalazi Day Centre and Crèche. Bambisanani young leaders from Mnyakanya School become the first in South Africa to gain the International Diana Award for their work developing and delivery a community-based HIV/AIDS Awareness course. Fourteen St. Marys students who worked in South Africa later gained the Diana Champion Volunteer Award.

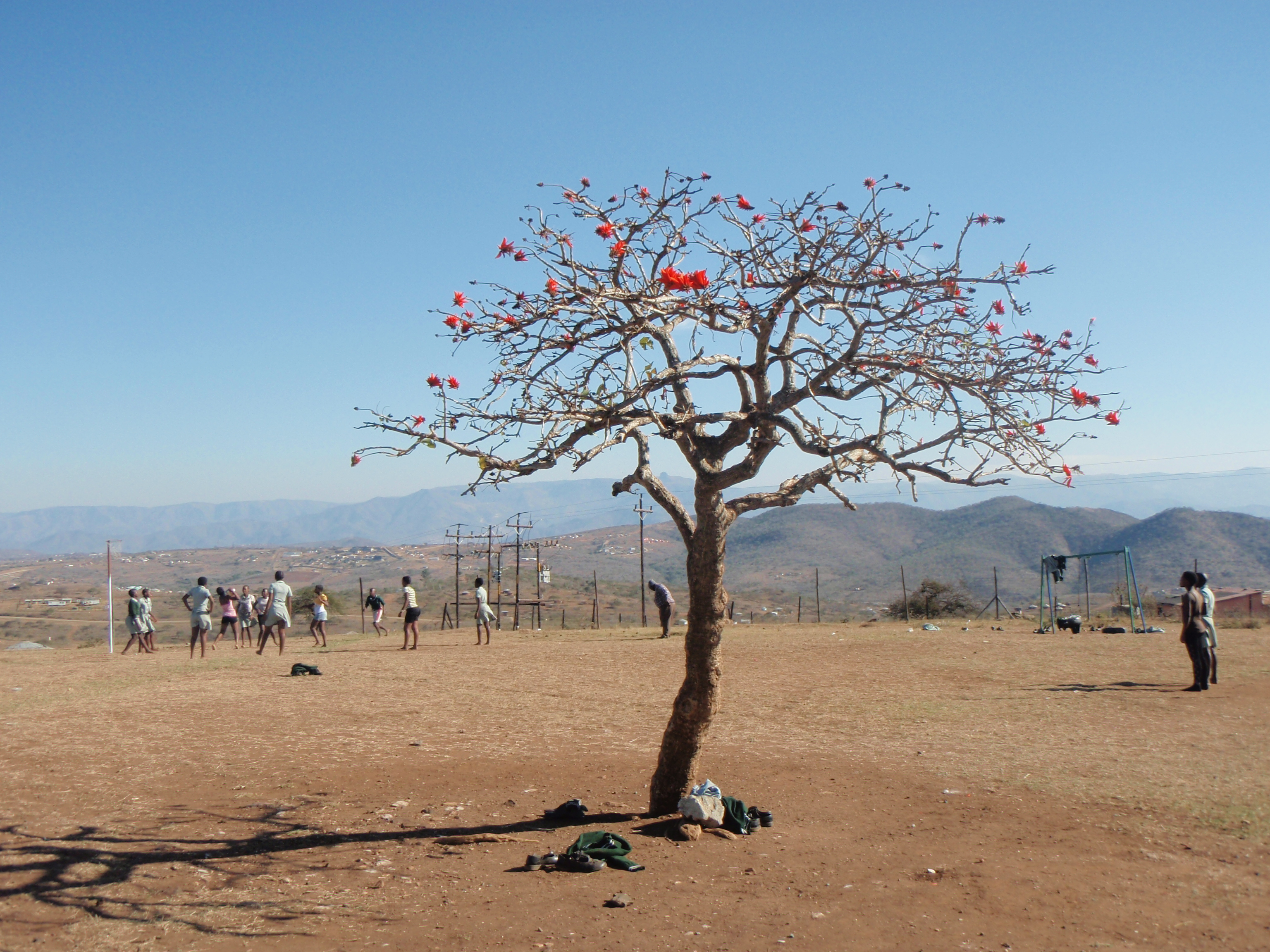
Tree at Ntolwane Primary School, KwaZulu-Natal, Bambisanani Partnership visit, 19 August 2012

In 2013, Bambisanani's second book was published Bambisanani 2012: Faster, Higher, Stronger with a Foreword from David Cordingley, British Council Director in South Africa. South African teachers, Pk Zondi (Bambisanani Coordinator at Mnyakakya School), Musa Xulu (Bambisanani Coordinator at Ntolwane Primary School) and Nombusa Nduli visited Leeds as part of the Connecting Classrooms and Bambisanani Partnership initiatives. St. Mary's Students and staff visited South Africa to develop Bambisanani programmes and projects at Mnyakanya School, Ntolwane Primary School and Zulufadder uMlalazi Day Centre and Crèche for orphans and vulnerable children. Diana Award winners Kavi Appuhamy and Chloe Tindale from St. Mary's met Prince William, Duke of Cambridge at a Diana Award Inspire Day in South Shields.

In 2014, the Bambisanani Partnership was honoured with membership of the John Paul II Foundation for Sport. South African artist Nils Burwitz visited St. Mary's as part of Nelson Mandela week in Leeds. Young Leaders from St. Mary's School and Mnyakanya School received the International Diana Award for their community collaboration work as part of the Bambisanani Partnership. Students and staff from St. Marys visited South Africa. Students from St. Mary's, Mnyakanya School and Eshowe School worked together to deliver a community Sports Festival and Reading Festival for 84 children from Ntolwane Primary School. Students from Mnyakanya and Eshowe gained the Bambisanani Leadership Award. In addition to the annual awards in memory of Laurie McCauley and Sbonelo Magwaza, new annual awards from the John Paul II Foundation for Sport were also introduced at Mnyakanya School and Ntolwane School in conjunction with the partnership. Bambisanani founder David Geldart was invited to speak about the Bambisanani Partnership at the Leeds City Council Life and Legacy of Nelson Mandela celebration at Leeds Civic Hall and at the Twenty Years of Freedom celebration at the South African High Commission in London. Art work from The Bambisanani Power of Sport competition by Sara Riley, Natalie O'Shea and Madeline Smith featured at a Civic Reception in Leeds to celebrate the Commonwealth Games Queens Relay Baton passing through the city. The work of the Bambisanani Partnership was featured in a speech by David Geldart at the International conference on Catholic Perspectives on Sport and Spirituality: Half time to Rio held at the University of Durham. Bambisanani Partnership supporter, Geoff Hurst visited St. Mary's.

In 2015, Mnyakanya School student, Simphiwe Ndlovu was offered a place at university to become a teacher with the support of a Bambisanani bursary. South African teachers Mbongiseni Mbambo, Nokwazi Mchunu and Eunice Makhoba visited St. Mary's and other Leeds schools as part of the Bambisanani Partnership and British Council Connecting Classrooms Initiative. The partnership provided two presentations at an international Global Learning conference at Leeds Trinity University. In addition to a speech by David Geldart, St. Mary's students Karl Verpyk, Megan Haskins, Eleanor Thompson, Myles Hanlon and Caroline Turnbull outlined their work in South Africa as volunteers and mentors. The St. Mary's visit to South Africa of students and staff also included Andrew Lockwood, Professional Development Manager from the University of Leeds which was the forerunner of the university's involvement with partnership. Bambisanani founder, David Geldart retired from St. Mary's School after 35 years' service and established the Bambisanani Partnership as a registered UK charity. Catherine Chattoe was appointed as Bambisanani Coordinator at St. Mary's. The Bambisanani Partnership was recognised with a Certificate of Appreciation Award from Rotary International. St. Mary's school was awarded Expert Centre for Global Learning status.

=== 2016–2020 ===
In 2016, The University of Leeds become members of the Bambisanani Partnership with three members of staff and nine students visiting South Africa as part of the Gryphons Abroad initiative led by Andrew Lockwood. The group introduced the Cycling to Success programme, teaching students from Mnyakanya School to both ride and maintain bikes. The group also introduced a Leadership through Sport to 100 primary school children from the Eshowe area. The tenth anniversary visit of students to South Africa saw St. Mary's students collaborate with students from Mnyakanya School and Eshowe School to organise a variety of community sports events. The visit also included a member of staff from Leeds Trinity University and was the start of the university's involvement in annual Bambisanani visits to South Africa. With Bambisanani support Mnyakanya School installed a Satellite Dish and access to the internet to improve teaching and learning provision at the school. Additionally, teachers at the school were provided with IT training. Working with the British Council and the Premier League, the Bambisanani Partnership introduced the Premier Skills programme in rural KwaZulu-Natal. The programme trained grass roots football coaches and referees as well as providing football-based classroom resources to support the teaching of English. Fourteen St. Marys Students who visited South Africa received the Diana Champion Volunteer Award for their work in South Africa in 2015. The group were responsible for mentoring Mnyakanya students through the Bambisanani Leadership Award and organising sports and reading festivals for primary school children. Three more Mnyakanya students, Sakhiseni Sikhakhane, Sthembiso Nxumalo and Zuzumuzi Shezi were awarded Bambisanani bursaries to pursue university and college courses.

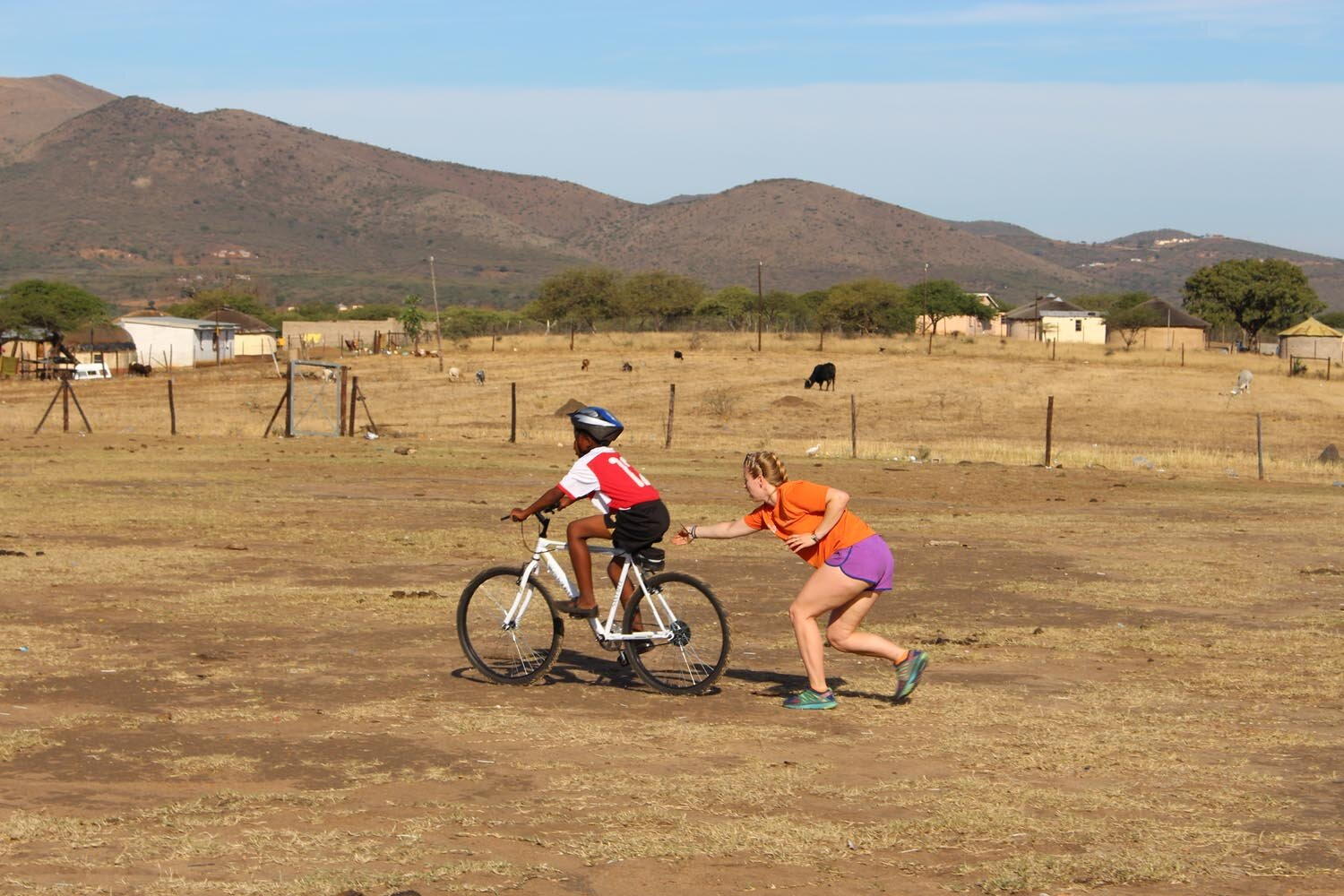
Bambisanani Partnership 'Cycling to Success' Programme, KwaZulu-Natal, South Africa 15 June 2016

In 2017, The Bambisanani Partnership's fourth book Bambisanani: Ten Years of Working Together and Learning Together was published with foreword from Tanni Grey-Thompson. Visits to South Africa from students and staff from St. Mary's School, the University of the Leeds and Leeds Trinity University engaged South African students in a variety of schools. The UK students delivered a range of Bambisanani programmes including Leadership through Sport in both secondary and primary schools, cycling, Sports and Reading Festivals as well as teaching English through the Premier Skills initiative. Fourteen students who had volunteered in South Africa in 2016 were presented with the Diana Champion Volunteer Award by Paralympic Gold Medallist, Hannah Cockroft.

In 2018 Bambisanani Leader, Simphiwe Ndlovu from Mnyakanya School successfully completed his three-year university degree to qualify as a teacher. The Bambisanani Partnership became a founding member of the Swiss based charity Sport and Sustainability International. Visits to South Africa took place by students and staff from St. Mary's School, Leeds Trinity University and the University of Leeds. 30 students from Mnyakanya School gained the Bambisanani Leadership Award. More than 100 primary school students gained the Bambisanani Leadership Award. The 'Cycling to Success' programme by university students continued and Sports Festivals were held in both the Nkandla area and Eshowe. The book Bambisanani: Ten Years of Working and Learning Together was presented at the Wenlock Olympian Games. Speaking at the event. David Geldart said that the partnership had been very influenced by William Penny Brookes' concept of Olympism. The work of the Bambisanani Partnership was honoured by the Lord Mayor of Leeds, Councillor Graham Latty and Lady Mayoress, Councillor Pat Latty at a reception at Leeds Civic Hall. St. Mary's student and Bambisanani volunteer, Sylvia Cullen was elected to the UK Youth Parliament. Members of Mnyakanya School and wider community attended Premier Skills workshops to gain football coaching skills. Earlier in the year students from Leeds Trinity University used Premier football-based resources to teach Literacy Skills at Ntolwane Primary School.

In 2019, Bambisanani Chairman David Geldart addressed the Australian Council for Health, Physical Education and Recreation (ACHPER) International Conference at the Australian Institute for Sport in Canberra about the work of the Bambisanani Partnership. Forty-three students and staff from St. Mary's, the University of Leeds and Leeds Trinity University were involved in visits to South Africa to deliver and develop Bambisanani programmes and projects. St. Mary's students collaborated with students from Mnyakanya School and Eshowe High School to deliver Sport, Reading and Writing Festivals to more than 120 students from Ntolwane Primary School. The St. Mary's students also delivered lessons in other curricular areas at Mnyakanya High School and volunteered at the uMlalazi Day Centre and Crèche. The university students worked collaboratively to deliver the Cycling to Success and Primary School Leadership Through Sport course to over 175 students. The students also taught a range of curriculum areas at Ntolwane Primary School. A collaboration between The Bambisanani Partnership, Rotary Club of Aireborough, Eshowe Rotary Club, Rotary International and KZN Department of Education resulted in a new Computer Room being opened at Mnyakanya School. The funding provided 20 computers, software, training and support for teachers. Bambisanani Chairman, David Geldart was invited to address an international conference in Prague on 'using the power of sport to change lives.'

In 2020, Professional footballer and Bambisanani supporter Jordan Sinnott died in tragic circumstances at the age of 25. Jordan's family appealed for clubs to donate football shirts with the wording 'Sinnott 25' on the back in honour of his memory. The appeal was backed by football greats Steven Gerrard and Gareth Southgate and attracted support from the world-wide soccer community. 826 shirts from 29 different countries were displayed at Jordan's funeral at Bradford City AFC's Valley Parade Stadium. The shirts were subsequently distributed to communities throughout the world including South Africa. The Bambisanani Partnership and St. Mary's School were honoured at the Youth Sport Trust 25th Anniversary Awards Dinner at the Ricoh Stadium in Coventry. Bambisanani Coordinator, Catherine Chattoe and Bambisanani Trustee, Barbara Pounder attended the event where the partnership was highly commended in the Outstanding Contribution to Community Award. The University of Leeds highlighted the Bambisanani Partnership contribution towards UN Global Development Goals. St. Mary's launched a sponsored event for 21 participants to collectively run/swim/walk/cycle the distance of 8709 miles (the distance from St. Mary's to Mnyakanya) to raise funds to bring running water to Mnyakanya. The Mnyakanya water project was successfully completed with the Bambisanani Partnership working collaboratively with partners in the UK and South Africa. Wild fires destroyed the homes of 21 children from Vumanhlamvu Primary School. The Bambisanani Partnership worked with the local community to provide emergency aid and build ten new homes. Former St. Mary's student and Bambisanani volunteer, Brogan O'Connor was appointed as Bambisanani Partnership charity trustee. The work of the Bambisanani Partnership was featured in Leeds United podcast Doing a Leeds in an interview with Matthew Lewis, Jermaine Beckford and Lucas Radebe. Annual Awards (Sportsman and Sports Women of the Year) in memory of Jordan Sinnott were established and presented at Vumanhlamvu Primary School in Nkandla.

=== 2021–Present Day ===
In February 2021, it was announced that Matthew Lewis became the first Patron of the Bambisanani Partnership. The impact of the Bambisanani Cycling to Success programme was highlighted in the Association of Physical Education journal Physical Education Matters. Lizzie Deignan professional world champion track and road racing cyclist offered the Bambisanani Partnership her future support. Mnyakanya School achieved its highest ever examination results. The Bambisanani Partnership was highly commended in the annual University of Leeds Sustainability Awards in the Global Impact category. Bambisanani launched an innovative International Athletics Challenge linking primary schools (albeit virtually) in Leeds and South Africa. The Vatican's Sport at the Service of Humanity covered the work of the partnership in an online article. Members of the Bambisanani team contributed to the development of a Global Digital Community (GDC), a joint initiative led by the Sport at the Service of Humanity Foundation and Save the Dream. Tyrone Gunnie from the South Africa High Commission and John Rolfe from the British Council recognised 15 years of the Bambisanani Partnership at a celebration event held at the University of Leeds. Annual Bambisanani awards were presented at Mnyakanya School, Ntolwane Primary School and Vumanhlamvu School in South Africa.

In 2022, the Bambisanani Partnership became a member of the British Council's Internationalism Alliance promoting global citizenship for young people. In March, Mnyakanya high School's matric class of 2021 achieved the best Grade 12 exam results in the school's history. In September, David Geldart, Founder and Chair of the Bambisanani Partnership, attended the Vatican's Sport for All Summit and met with Pope Francis. Staff from both the University of Leeds and Leeds Trinity University visited South Africa to establish links with a range of different partners, and to restart their successful international sports development programme. Three awards in honour of Jordan Sinnott were presented at Vumanhlamvu Primary School.

In January 2023, member schools of the Bambisanani Partnership from the Nkandla region of became the first schools in the world to pledge their support to Pope Francis’ global appeal to make sport more cohesive, accessible and inclusive. Following a break of three years due to Covid 19 restrictions, 2023 proved to be a remarkable year of volunteering in South Africa for the partnership. 41 students together with 11 members of staff from St. Mary's School, Menston, University of Leeds, Leeds Trinity University and Newcastle College spent more than three months in South Africa. In four separate coordinated visits, the volunteers worked with 3631 South African students from9 33 different schools of which 17 were new partner institutions. Through a collaboration between the charity and KZN Cycling, 2,000 young people took part in a cycling programme. A great highlight of St. Mary's visit for everyone involved was another ‘first’ for the Bambisanani Partnership: a visit to Thembimfundo Special School for children with a wide range of different disabilities. The team ran the school's first ever sports day for the children, which included activities such as dancing, high jump and netball. During 2023, the third annual Bambisanani Partnership International Athletics Challenge, supported by the KwaZulu-Natal Department of Sport and Recreation, brought together 15 primary schools: 11 from rural KwaZulu-Natal in South Africa and four from the Leeds/Bradford area. In September 2023, David Geldart, CEO of the Bambisanani Partnership, was invited to speak at the International Olympic Academy in Olympia, Greece.

In 2024, the third Annual Bambisanani Partnership International Athletics Challenge brought together 15 primary schools: 11 from rural KwaZulu-Natal in South Africa and 4 from the Leeds/Bradford area of Yorkshire in the UK. 335 students participated in a range six of athletics challenges in their own schools and then compared performances ‘virtually’ to create competition between the schools. In April, David Farmer, Deputy Headteacher from St. Joseph’s Primary School, Pudsey, successfully carried out a challenge to travel virtually from Leeds to Africa to raise funds by running, swimming, cycling and rowing the equivalent distance. In July, David Geldart was invited to attend a Service of Thanksgiving to mark the 30th year of South Africa’s democracy at Westminster Abbey. In June, Althaeá Dickinson organised a campaign to get 1,091 reading books into South African primary schools. These books were delivered to Vumanhlamvu Primary School, Ntolwane Primary School, Little Flower Primary School in Eshowe and the Zulufadder Doremi Kindergarten. In October 2024, South African teachers, Mrs Pk Zondi and Miss Mazet Langa from Mnyakanya High School and Mrs Eunice Mchunu from Umlazi Primary School together with students Amahle Nsbande and Bayanda Gcaba from Mnyakanya visited Leeds as part of the Bambisanani Partnership exchange programme.

In 2025, 35 students and 10 members of staff, from St. Mary’s School, Menston; The University of Leeds and Newcastle College volunteered in South Africa. Over a three-month period, they delivered a range of needs, led Bambisanani projects and programs to 3,679 young people in 32 different schools including seven schools that were new to the initiative.Throughout the year the charity’s partnership with KZN Cycling trained 3,490 young people how to ride and maintain bikes. This work has now progressed to include various Cycling Competitions and a Talent Identification Program. The Cycling program reached the milestone of involving 10,000 children since the initiative began; an achievement that was recognized in the South African Parliament for ‘transforming lives and communities’.
