= Matthew Lewis (actor) =

English actor (born 1989)

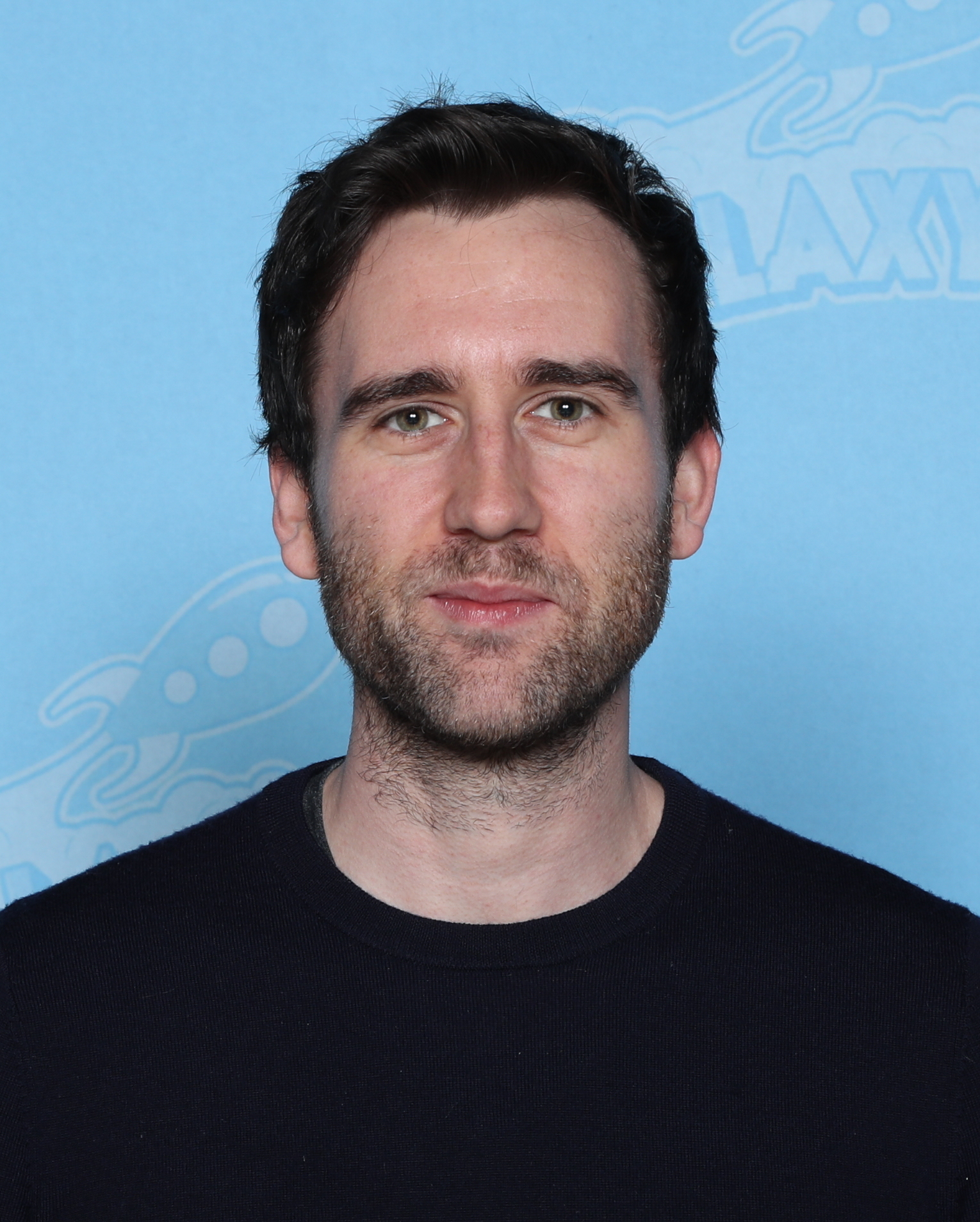
- Lewis in 2020
- Born: Matthew David Lewis; 27 June 1989 (age 37); Leeds, West Yorkshire, England
- Occupation: Actor
- Years active: 1995–present
- Notable work: Harry Potter
- Spouse: Angela Jones (m. 2018)
- Relatives: Anthony Lewis (brother)
- Website: www.matthewlewis.tv

Matthew David Lewis (born 27 June 1989) is an English actor. He is best known for his role as Neville Longbottom in the Harry Potter film series.

Born in Leeds, Lewis made his acting debut in Some Kind of Life (1995), guest-starring on dramas for ITV and BBC One before appearing in Harry Potter and the Philosopher's Stone (2001). Lewis played the role for ten years, concluding with the final film, Harry Potter and the Deathly Hallows – Part 2 (2011), for which he received critical praise. Following the series, Lewis had a recurring role in The Syndicate and performed his first theatre role in Our Boys at the Duchess Theatre in 2012.

Lewis starred in The Rise (2012) which premiered at the Toronto International Film Festival to positive reviews and made appearances on BBC dramas Bluestone 42 and Death in Paradise in 2013 and 2015, respectively. Lewis had a supporting role in Me Before You (2016), which became a box office success. He was cast in the crime dramas Ripper Street and Happy Valley before starring on the ITV drama Girlfriends in 2018. Lewis appeared in Terminal (2018), which premiered at the Edinburgh International Film Festival as well as Baby Done (2020). In 2020-2021, Lewis starred in Channel 5 television series All Creatures Great and Small to critical praise.

== Early life and education ==
Matthew David Lewis was born on 27 June 1989 in Horsforth, Leeds, West Yorkshire, to Adrian Lewis and Lynda Needham. He grew up in Horsforth. He has two older brothers: Chris, a film editor, and Anthony, an actor. He was educated at St Mary's Menston Catholic Voluntary Academy.

== Career ==
=== 1995–2000: Beginnings ===
Lewis has been acting since age five. He made his professional debut in television film Some Kind of Life (1995), directed by Kay Mellor. He guest-starred in the BBC One crime drama Dalziel and Pascoe before appearing in ITV series' Where the Heart Is and Heartbeat in 1997 and 1999, respectively.

=== 2001–2011: Harry Potter and recognition ===
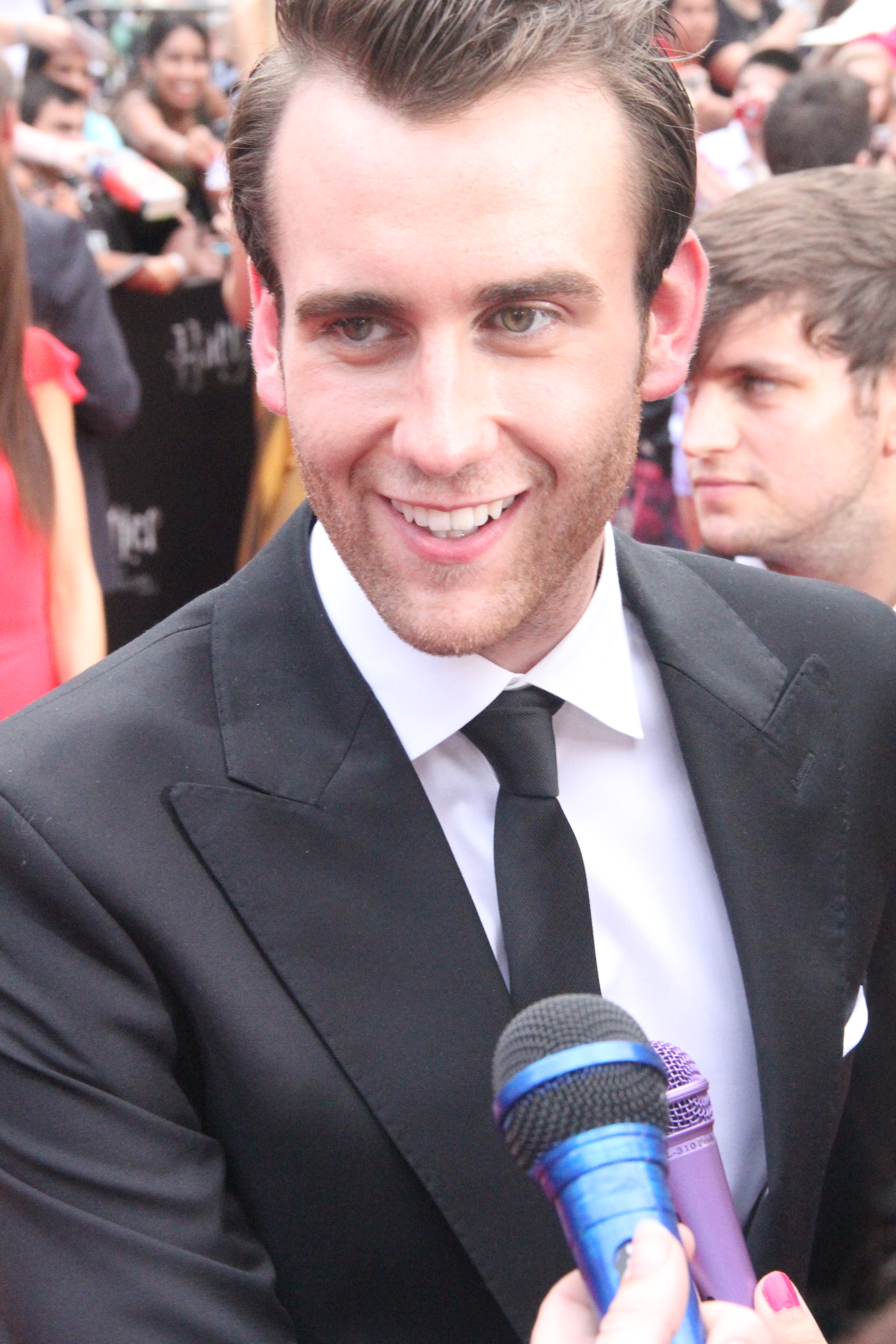
Lewis at the US premiere of Harry Potter and the Deathly Hallows – Part 2 in 2011

In 1999, castings were held across the UK for Harry Potter and the Philosopher's Stone, the film adaptation of British author J. K. Rowling's novel. Lewis, a fan of the series, initially attended an open audition at the Queens Hotel, Leeds, before being contacted two months later to perform a screen test for director Chris Columbus, eventually earning the role of Neville Longbottom. Harry Potter and the Philosopher's Stone was released in 2001 and became a critical and commercial hit. For the role, Lewis wore a set of false teeth, shoes two sizes too big, a fat suit and ear prosthetics. He reprised his role a year later in Harry Potter and the Chamber of Secrets; Lewis has stated that his favorite lines stem from the film.

Harry Potter and the Prisoner of Azkaban (2004) and Harry Potter and the Goblet of Fire (2005) both premiered to critical acclaim. Harry Potter and the Order of the Phoenix was released in 2007. During filming, co-star Helena Bonham Carter accidentally ruptured Lewis' eardrum when she stuck her wand in his ear during a scene. Lewis commented on enjoying the "diverse nature" of his role in the film which contained more "emotion and drama" than its predecessors. Harry Potter and the Half-Blood Prince became the second-highest-grossing film of 2009. In a 2009 interview, Lewis spoke about his experience working with director David Yates, discussing "about what Neville would be doing and feeling, even [..] in the background." In April 2011, Lewis made his stage debut as Lester Cole in Agatha Christie's Verdict touring production.

Lewis returned once more for the final Harry Potter installments, Harry Potter and the Deathly Hallows – Part 1 (2010) and Harry Potter and the Deathly Hallows – Part 2 (2011). His performance was praised by critics for his "scene stealing potential"; CTV News referred to Lewis as a "breakout stud" and "man of action". Harry Potter author J. K. Rowling gave a speech at the premiere of Deathly Hallows – Part 2 in London, where she stated that there were seven major cast members in the series, whom she referred to as "The Big Seven" (Daniel Radcliffe, Rupert Grint, Emma Watson, Tom Felton, Lewis, Evanna Lynch and Bonnie Wright).

=== 2012–present: Further work and television ===
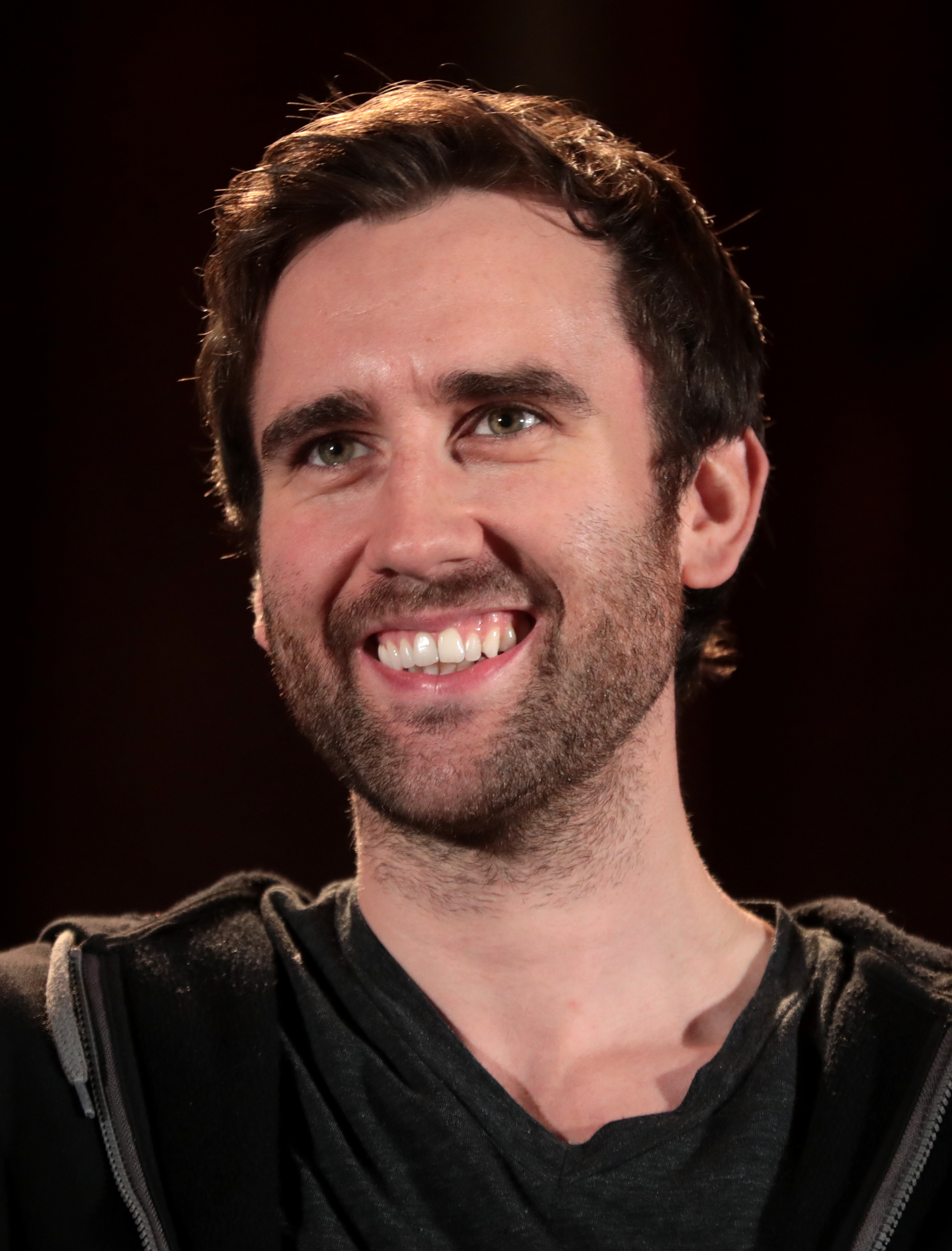
Lewis at the 2019 Phoenix Fan Fusion

In 2012, Lewis portrayed Jamie Bradley in Kay Mellor's five-part BBC One television drama The Syndicate. He made his West End debut, playing Mick in Our Boys, at the Duchess Theatre from September to December 2012. Lewis co-starred in the 2012 crime film The Rise, which premiered at the Toronto International Film Festival. Express stated that "Lewis provide[s] as much pleasure as the mechanics of the twisted revenge plot." He starred in two series of the South Africa filmed black comedy Bluestone 42, which premiered on BBC Three in 2013. In 2015, Lewis guest-starred on the television crime drama Death in Paradise.

Lewis played Patrick, the boyfriend of Emilia Clarke's character, in Me Before You (2016), which proved to be a commercial success. Bustle noted that "Lewis' role is one mostly of comedic relief" but the actor "plays the character's outrage perfectly"; Lewis stated he was careful not to make the role a "laughed-off villain, but a fully-formed character." That same year, Lewis reoccurred in two BBC productions, crime dramas Ripper Street and Happy Valley. He starred alongside Niamh Cusack in the London premiere of Unfaithful, written by playwright Owen McCafferty, from August to October 2016. In 2017, Lewis, a friend of comedian Sal Vulcano, made an appearance on Impractical Jokers as himself filling in for Vulcano, which was shot at Universal Orlando.

In 2018, he starred in the ITV drama Girlfriends, written by Mellor, and appeared in the 2018 neo-noir Terminal, which premiered at the Edinburgh International Film Festival to negative reviews. Lewis starred opposite Rose Matafeo in Baby Done (2020), produced by Taika Waititi. The Guardian praised his "thoroughly likable performance" as well as the "laid-back" chemistry between him and Matafeo. Lewis appeared in the Yorkshire-set television series All Creatures Great and Small, which aired on Channel 5 in 2020 to high ratings and critical acclaim. The New York Times referred to Lewis' portrayal as a "dashing suitor" who achieved the character's "natural confidence [..] incredibly well." The programme was renewed for a second series in December 2020.

In 2022, Lewis appeared in the Harry Potter 20th Anniversary: Return to Hogwarts film as himself, along with most of the original Harry Potter cast.

In 2025, Lewis starred as Canon Clement in the Acorn TV/Channel 5 series Murder Before Evensong, based on the novel by Richard Coles.

== Other activities ==
Lewis is a vice-president of the Leeds Rugby Foundation charity. Lewis hosts the Leeds United podcast "Doing a Leeds" with former professional footballer Jermaine Beckford.

In February 2021, it was announced that Lewis became the first patron of the Bambisanani Partnership.

== Honours ==
On 24 July 2012, Lewis received an honorary Master of Arts degree from Leeds Metropolitan University for his contribution to the arts and charity work.

== Personal life ==
Lewis married Angela Jones in Italy on 28 May 2018, after the two had become engaged in November 2016. The couple had met in January of that year, when Lewis participated in the annual Celebration of Harry Potter event at Universal Orlando, where Jones was a VIP event manager for the resort and the event.

Lewis is an atheist.

== Filmography ==
=== Film ===
Year	Title	Role	Notes
2001	Harry Potter and the Philosopher's Stone	Neville Longbottom	
2002	Harry Potter and the Chamber of Secrets	Neville Longbottom	
2004	Harry Potter and the Prisoner of Azkaban	Neville Longbottom	
2005	Harry Potter and the Goblet of Fire	Neville Longbottom	
2007	Harry Potter and the Order of the Phoenix	Neville Longbottom	
2009	Harry Potter and the Half-Blood Prince	Neville Longbottom	
2010	Harry Potter and the Deathly Hallows – Part 1	Neville Longbottom	
2011	Harry Potter and the Deathly Hallows – Part 2	Neville Longbottom	
2012	Night of the Loving Dead	Nigel (voice)	Short film
2012	The Rise	Dodd	Also known as Wasteland
2013	The Sweet Shop	The Reporter	
2016	Juliet Remembered	Toby	Short film
2016	Me Before You	Patrick	
2018	Terminal	Lenny	
2020	Baby Done	Tim	
2026	Touché	Tom	

=== Television ===
Year	Title	Role	Notes
1996	Dalziel and Pascoe	Davy Plessey	Episode: "An Advancement of Learning"
1996	Some Kind of Life	Johnathan Taylor	Television film
1997	Where the Heart Is	Billy Bevan	Episode: "Things Fall Apart"
1998	City Central	Ben Morton	Episode: "Throwing It All Away"
1999	Heartbeat	Alan Quigley	Episode: "Hollywood or Bust"
2000	This Is Personal: The Hunt for the Yorkshire Ripper	Christopher Oldfield (aged 9)	Mini-series; 2 episodes
2006	Children's Party at the Palace	Neville Longbottom	Television Special
2012	The Syndicate	Jamie Bradley	Series 1; 5 episodes
2013–2015	Bluestone 42	Corporal Gordon 'Tower Block' House	Series 2 & 3; 13 episodes
2015	Death in Paradise	Dominic Claydon	Episode: #4.7
2016	Happy Valley	Sean Balmforth	Series 2; 4 episodes
2016	Ripper Street	Sgt. Samuel 'Drum' Drummond	Series 4 & 5; 12 episodes
2017	Drunk History	Edmond Halley	Episode: "Isaac Newton / King Alfred and the Vikings"
2017	Impractical Jokers	Himself	Episode: "Universal Appeal"
2018	Girlfriends	Tom Dreyton	5 episodes
2018	Nutritiously Nicola!	Himself	Episodes: "Nutritiously Nicola and the Celebrity Client: Parts 1 & 2"
2020–2021	All Creatures Great and Small	Hugh Hulton	Series 1 & 2; 7 episodes
2022	Harry Potter 20th Anniversary: Return to Hogwarts	Himself	HBO Max Special
2024	Avoidance	Brett	Series 2; 6 episodes
2025	Murder Before Evensong	Canon Daniel Clement	6 episodes
2026	The Fortune	Jimmy Brent	Main cast. 4 episodes

=== Music video ===
Year	Title	Artist	Role	Notes
2012	"Filth"	A Band of Buriers	Boyfriend	

=== Theatre ===
Year	Title	Role	Notes
2006	The Queen's Handbag	Neville Longbottom	Harry Potter skit, filmed during production of Harry Potter and the Order of the Phoenix
2011	Agatha Christie's Verdict	Lester Cole	Stage, Tour Production
2012	Our Boys	Mick	West End, Stage Production
2016	Unfaithful	Peter	Stage Production

=== Video games ===
Year	Title	Role (voice)	Notes
2007	Harry Potter and the Order of the Phoenix	Neville Longbottom	
2011	Harry Potter and the Deathly Hallows – Part 2	Neville Longbottom	
2016	Lego Dimensions	Neville Longbottom	

=== Theme park ===
Year	Title	Role	Notes
2010	Harry Potter and the Forbidden Journey	Neville Longbottom	Theme park attraction
