= The Bishop Wheeler Catholic Academy Trust =

Location
- North West Leeds, Ilkley and North Yorkshire England

District information
- Type: Academy Trust
- Motto: Motto: Veritas et Caritas (Latin for In Truth and Love)
- Established: 1 March 2013
- Schools: Primary 14; Secondary 2

Students and staff
- Students: 4,900
- Colours: Green Red

Other information
- Chair: Mrs D Gaskin, Chair of the Academy Trust Board
- Website: bishopwheelercatholicacademytrust.org

The Bishop Wheeler Catholic Academy Trust is a multi-academy trust consisting of16 schools in the North West Leeds, Ilkley and North Yorkshire area that converted to academies since 2013. The trust is named after Gordon Wheeler, the seventh Roman Catholic Bishop of Leeds from 1966 until 1985.

== Member schools ==
The Bishop Wheeler Academy Trust has 16 member schools:

School name	School type	Date joined
St. Mary's Menston	Secondary	1 March 2013
St. Joseph's Catholic Primary School Otley	Primary	1 March 2013
St. Mary's Horsforth Catholic Voluntary Academy	Primary	1 March 2013
St. Joseph's Catholic Primary School Pudsey	Primary	1 March 2013
Ss Peter and Paul Catholic Primary School (Yeadon)	Primary	1 April 2013
Sacred Heart Catholic Primary School Ilkley	Primary	1 April 2013
St Mary's Catholic Primary School Knaresborough	Primary	1 July 2015
St Joseph's Catholic Primary School Harrogate	Primary	1 July 2015
Holy Name Catholic Voluntary Academy Cookridge	Primary	1 August 2015
St. Stephen's Catholic Primary School and Nursery Skipton	Primary	1 August 2015
St Robert's Catholic Primary School, Harrogate, a Voluntary Academy	Primary	1 March 2021
St John Fisher Catholic High School, Harrogate	Secondary	30 November 2021
St Joseph's Catholic Primary School, a Voluntary Academy (Tadcaster)	Primary	1 February 2022
Barkston Ash Catholic Primary School	Primary	1 February 2024
St Joseph's Catholic Primary School, Barnoldswick	Primary	1 March 2024
St Wilfrid's Catholic Primary School, Ripon	Primary	1 March 2024

The proposals by the Roman Catholic Diocese of Leeds state there is 1 other school that could join the trust.

== History ==
In March 2012, plans were announced for Catholic schools across the Leeds Diocese to investigate teaming up to form trust academies that would no longer be under local authority control. The Governing Bodies of St. Mary's Menston and four other schools considered a proposal of converting to Academy status in 2013 and forming together a Multi-Academy Trust. A consultation period occurred between September and October 2012. The academy conversion took place on 1 March 2013. The logo of the trust is Bishop Wheeler's Episcopal Coat of Arms. The first Chair of the Academy Trust Board was Caroline Hyde. The second Chair of the Academy Trust Board is Diane Gaskin.
