= Kathleen McQueen =

Fictional character from Hollyoaks

- Hollyoaks character
- Portrayed by: Alison Burrows
- Duration: 2009–2011, 2014
- First appearance: 28 December 2009
- Last appearance: 25 September 2014
- Introduced by: Lucy Allan (2009); Paul Marquess (2010); Bryan Kirkwood (2014)
- Spin-off appearances: Hollyoaks Later (2009); Hollyoaks: King of Hearts (2010); Hollyoaks: The McQueens (2016)
In-universe information
- Family: McQueen
- Mother: Marlena McQueen
- Half-brothers: Louis McQueen
- Half-sisters: Myra McQueen; Reenie McQueen
- Daughters: Theresa McQueen
- Granddaughters: Kathleen-Angel McQueen; Myra-Pocahontas Savage-McQueen
- Grandmothers: Queenie McQueen
- Aunts: Marguerite McQueen
- Nephews: Niall Rafferty; John Paul McQueen; Louis McQueen
- Nieces: Jacqui McQueen; Mercedes McQueen; Tina Reilly; Carmel McQueen; Michaela McQueen; Carmina McQueen; Porsche McQueen; Celine McQueen; Cleo McQueen
- First cousins: Breda McQueen; Victor McQueen
- Other relatives: Bart McQueen; Jennifique McQueen; Matthew McQueen

Kathleen McQueen is a fictional character from the British Channel 4 soap opera Hollyoaks, played by Alison Burrows. She first appeared during late-night spin-off Hollyoaks Later in September 2009 as the sister of Myra McQueen (Nicole Barber-Lane) and mother of Theresa McQueen (Jorgie Porter). Burrows reprised her role as Kathleen in August 2014, but left again in September.

== Creation and development ==
The character of Kathleen was first announced in July 2009 as the mother of Theresa McQueen, another member of the McQueen family. Hollyoaks producers later announced that Kathleen would be portrayed by Alison Burrows and would appear in the second series of Hollyoaks Later. Hollyoaks Later producer Bryan Kirkwood described Kathleen's entrance storyline in an interview with Digital Spy: "Theresa gets a modelling job in the City and wants to kill two birds with one stone and visit her mum Kathleen in prison while she's there. Jorgie Porter's really blossomed over the last year and turns out some emotional stuff when she meets her screen mum."

Following her Hollyoaks Later appearance, Kathleen made a full appearance in Hollyoaks in December 2009. A Hollyoaks spokesperson commented on Kathleen's arrival, saying: "Theresa's devastated when her mum gives her the brush off but she's soon back with her tail between her legs towards the end of the year in time for Christmas, though. Just how will Theresa react to her mum wanting to be a part of her life again? And how will Myra cope with her sister's sudden reappearance?" In February 2010, Inside Soap revealed the character would leave later in the month.

In October 2010, it was announced that Burrows would reprise her role in December 2010, reintroduced by series producer Paul Marquess in a storyline which features Kathleen blackmailing her family after discovering one of the McQueens' "darkest secrets". Jorgie Porter later expressed her excitement over Kathleen's return: "I love working with Ali. The scenes we do together are so intense — I hope she stays at Hollyoaks for a lot longer this time." Marquess later announced a Hollyoaks late-night special called Hollyoaks: King of Hearts, which would focus on the McQueens attempts to collect money to pay Kathleen after her threats to report Theresa for the murder of Calvin Valentine (Ricky Whittle).

== Storylines ==
Kathleen first appears when Theresa visits her in a prison in London. Kathleen is not happy to learn that Theresa is staying with Myra, so tells her to move back with her grandmother. Kathleen then tells Theresa that her boyfriend Alec has asked her to move to Spain with him after she is released, before adding that Theresa is not invited to join her. After a small argument, Kathleen returns to her cell, leaving Theresa in tears.

Kathleen is released from prison months later and tells Theresa she is coming for Christmas. The rest of the McQueens are sceptical, which proves correct when she does not arrive. Several days later, Kathleen arrives in Hollyoaks in Alec's sports car, claiming the pair have split up. She asks Myra for money, which Theresa's father left for her. Myra refuses and tells her to leave before Theresa finds her. Later, Theresa meets Kathleen just as she is leaving the village. Kathleen, not wanting to disappoint her daughter, claims she has come to stay. Kathleen begins to buy Theresa expensive gifts. Theresa is desperate to believe her mother has changed. However, Kathleen encourages Theresa to shoplift, which causes more tension between Kathleen and the rest of the McQueens. Kathleen tells Theresa they should run away together to London, to which Theresa agrees. Myra and Jacqui McQueen (Claire Cooper) confront Kathleen before she leaves and reveal that she has been stealing money from deceased Tina Reilly's (Leah Hackett) bank account. Theresa refuses to believe Myra or Jacqui and prepares to leave. After a fight breaks out, Theresa is forced to choose to go with her mother to London or stay in the village. Theresa decides to stay in Hollyoaks as Kathleen leaves.

Kathleen returns in December 2010 after being caught using fake money. Kathleen is taken to the McQueens by police detective constable Ethan Scott (Craig Vye). Theresa refuses to have anything to do with her mother. Later, Kathleen discovers that Theresa had a daughter, and her cousin Carmel Valentine (Gemma Merna) is trying to kidnap her. Kathleen is suspicious, demanding to know why. She then realises that the baby is Carmel's husband Calvin's daughter. After she questions Theresa, Kathleen learns that Theresa killed Calvin. Kathleen confronts Carmel and informs the family that she won't report Carmel to the police of Calvin's murder if Carmel terminates her parental rights to Theresa's baby and the McQueens give her money. The McQueens eventually pay Kathleen £2,000 and catch her paying off a policeman. Despite blackmailing her family, Kathleen moves in with Myra. She becomes annoyed when Carmel attempts to snatch Theresa's baby again, so decides to have her granddaughter baptised. After locking Myra and Mercedes McQueen (Jennifer Metcalfe) in rooms upstairs, Kathleen, Theresa and Bart McQueen (Jonny Clarke) have the baby's christening, naming her Kathleen "Katy" Khloe Angel McQueen, as Theresa had planned to call her. Kathleen left in 2011 after her latest scam to use her daughter's kidney for money came to light.

Kathleen returns to Hollyoaks in August 2014 and is run over by Sonny Valentine (Aaron Fontaine), who insists that Kathleen jumped onto the car. She claims to have badly injured her ankle, and Nana forces Carmel to allow her to stay. Kathleen later visits her daughter, Theresa, in prison and promises to find dirt on Sonny, who is stopping Theresa from seeing Kathleen-Angel. Kathleen later drags Mercedes and Jacqui's adoptive daughter, Phoebe McQueen (Mandip Gill) into her plan to try and drive Sonny away, but when Sonny offers Kathleen a load of cash, she disappears. It later transpires that Sonny has beaten Kathleen up severely, and threatens to kill her if she breathes a word to anyone. Kathleen then calls Theresa and tells her that she can't help her escape anymore, which upsets both Theresa and Kathleen. A few weeks later, Sonny walks in on Kathleen attempting to call Carmel, but he stops her and threatens her again. He throws a large amount of money at Kathleen, and as she is picking it all up, Carmel enters and asks Kathleen what Sonny has done to her. The next day, Carmel, Myra, Phoebe and Mercedes visit Kathleen in hospital, where she explains that Sonny beat her up and threatened to kill her if she told anybody. As the McQueens try and take Kathleen to the police station to tell them about Sonny, Kathleen flees and asks a taxi to take her to the airport, intending to use the tickets to Spain that Sonny bought her. Before leaving, she tells Carmel, Myra, Phoebe and Mercedes that Sonny is very dangerous, and that she doesn't want to get hurt again. That December, Myra tells John-Paul that she couldn't attend his wedding with Ste.

== Reception ==
In 2017, Johnathon Hughes from Digital Spy called Kathleen "cunning" and "selfish" and wrote, "skanky Kathleen was trouble from the minute she first appeared on screen – in prison". He also called her "Scheming, blackmailing and not giving a stuff about her family unless she wanted something from them", and noted how the character "popped in and out" of the soap but did not become a regular and that she was rarely mentioned following her last appearance.
