= Girlfriends (2018 TV series) =

British comedy-drama television series

- Genre: Comedy drama
- Created by: Kay Mellor
- Written by: Kay Mellor
- Directed by: Kay Mellor; Dominic Leclerc
- Starring: Phyllis Logan; Miranda Richardson; Zoë Wanamaker; Daisy Head; Matthew Lewis
- Theme music composer: Hal Lindes
- Opening theme: "Ain't No Mountain High Enough"
- Ending theme: Hal Lindes
- Composer: Hal Lindes
- Country of origin: United Kingdom
- Original language: English
- No. of series: 1
- No. of episodes: 6

Production
- Executive producers: Kay Mellor; Polly Hill
- Producer: Josh Dynevor
- Production locations: Leeds, Yorkshire, England
- Editor: Kay Mellor
- Running time: 46 minutes (without adverts); 60 minutes (inc. adverts)
- Production company: Rollem Productions

Original release
- Network: ITV
- Release: 3 January – 7 February 2018

Girlfriends is a British comedy-drama television series, first broadcast on ITV on 3 January 2018. It follows the lives of three middle-aged women who have been friends since their teenage years. The series was written, created and directed by Kay Mellor. The drama was not renewed for a second series.

== Cast ==
=== Main ===
- Phyllis Logan as Linda Hutchinson
- Miranda Richardson as Sue Thackery
- Zoë Wanamaker as Gail Stanley
- Philip Cumbus as Andrew Thackery, Sue's son
- Daisy Head as Ruby Hutchinson, Linda's daughter
- Matthew Lewis as Tom Drayton, Gail's son

=== Recurring ===
- Emmett J. Scanlan as DI Chris Donoghue
- Rochenda Sandall as DS Anne Thurston
- Kobe Jerome as Ben, Tom and Corinne's son
- Steve Evets as Micky Hutchinson
- Chris Fountain as Ryan Hutchinson, Linda's son
- Elena Saurel as Stacey
- Paula Wilcox as Carole Hardcastle
- Valerie Lilley as Edna, Gail's mother
- Adrian Rawlins as Dave, Gail's ex-husband
- Anthony Head as John, Sue's married lover and Andrew's father
- Wendy Craig as Barbara Thackery, Sue's mother
- Dave Hill as Frank, Barbara's boyfriend
- Matthew Marsh as Alan Forbes, Micky's insurance agent
- Rhea Bailey as Corinne Anderson, Tom's ex-girlfriend and Ben's mother

== Episodes ==
| No. | Title | Directed by | Written by | Original release date | UK viewers (millions) |
|---|---|---|---|---|---|
| 1 | "Episode 1" | Kay Mellor | Kay Mellor | 3 January 2018 | 7.24 |
When Linda Hutchinson (Phyllis Logan)'s husband Micky (Steve Evets) vanishes while on a cruise to celebrate their wedding anniversary she turns to her lifelong friends Sue (Miranda Richardson) and Gail (Zoë Wanamaker) for support, but each of them is facing their own problems: Sue's boss and lover, John (Anthony Head), tells her that her article on older brides is not what their magazine wants, and that Sue is too old for the job; their son, Andrew (Philip Cumbus), tells her to sue. Gail is preoccupied with raising her grandson Ben (Kobe Jerome), while son Tom (Matthew Lewis) comes home from prison on an ankle tag, her mother Edna (Valerie Lilley) is becoming more and more unusual, and she wants to reconcile with her newly-divorced husband, Dave (Adrian Rawlins).
| 2 | "Episode 2" | Kay Mellor | Kay Mellor | 10 January 2018 | 5.95 |
Sue reluctantly faces her birthday and tensions arise with her son Andrew, especially when he tells her that he is gay (which she has no problem with) and that he and his partner have two children, a toddler and a newborn (which she is surprised by); she is even more hurt when her mother Barbara (Wendy Craig) tells her that she knew all along. Gail is determined to try and rekindle the spark between her and Dave before their divorce is finalised, but she is distracted when Tom is arrested for staying out past his curfew because he slept with Linda's daughter Ruby (Daisy Head). Sue visits her grandchildren for the first time, and Andrew promises her that she can visit, providing she reigns her flighty tendencies in. Carole Hardcastle (Paula Wilcox) turns up on Linda's doorstep, accusing Linda of pushing Micky overboard.
| 3 | "Episode 3" | Kay Mellor | Kay Mellor | 17 January 2018 | 6.01 |
Gail looks forward to her meeting with Dave. Linda is interrogated by DI Donoghue (Emmett J Scanlan) and DS Thurston (Rochenda Sandall), with Andrew acting as her solicitor. Gail is confronted by Ben's mother Corrinne (Rhea Bailey) and her boyfriend, who say that Corrinne has visitation rights. Gail lets them take Ben for the day. Andrew, as well as representing Linda, pushes Sue to give John her letter; she does so, and Andrew tells her to visit and see her grandchildren. Gail is contacted by her mother Edna's nurse, saying that Edna is no longer fit to live alone. They view a care home, which Edna does not like. On the journey home, they agree that Edna should stay with Gail for the time being. They find out that Tom has been released from custody, still tagged. After a conversation with Carole's colleague Veronica (Alison Burrows), Sue and Gail find out that Carole has psychopathic tendencies and has twice been sanctioned over her psychotic behaviour, which includes previously stalking a member of Micky's band, Jimmy (Gerard Fletcher). Ruby returns from the ship, determined not to return, and Linda is subsequently released when evidence of Carole's mental state is proven. Alan Forbes (Matthew Marsh), a representative of Micky's insurance company, tells Linda, Ruby and Sue (with whom he had a flirtatious relationship) that Micky most likely killed himself; Linda is upset, as this means the insurance company won't pay out. Dave and Tom have an angry confrontation when Dave comes to collect Gail, causing Dave to storm out. Corrinne phones Gail and Tom - she won't be bringing Ben back. Donoghue and Thurston confront Carole at a club, and accuse her of wasting police time. She travels to Linda's house, lets herself in with the spare key, and stabs Linda's cat, Florence, killing it.
| 4 | "Episode 4" | Dominic Leclerc | Kay Mellor | 24 January 2018 | 5.84 |
Overstretched Gail reaches breaking point. With her son's drug addict ex refusing to return her grandson, Gail sets out to find him and bring him home. With Tom still on bail, she turns to her friend Linda for help, but she's not prepared for the shocking situation she discovers. Gail is distraught when her mother's increasing forgetfulness puts the family in grave danger and, with everything she's trying to juggle, she's crestfallen to discover her livelihood could be in jeopardy. After being cleared of all charges by the police, Linda's horrified when a revenge-seeking Carole breaks into her home. Knowing Carole is mentally unstable, the girlfriends are terrified to discover just how far she'll go when she's pushed to the edge. With the date set for her age discrimination tribunal, Sue's getting cold feet about laying herself bare in court. As John turns on the charm to win her over, will he be able to tempt Sue into dropping the legal action?
| 5 | "Episode 5" | Dominic Leclerc | Kay Mellor | 31 January 2018 | 5.87 |
Sue and Gail are left reeling from Linda's shock revelation. With the prospect of Micky's body being found in Spain weighing heavy on her mind, Linda takes drastic actions that send her friends and family into chaos. After spending the night in a B&B, a forlorn Gail and her mother Edna return home to face the fire damage, but Gail's heart is lifted when her ex-husband Dave offers to help with the clean up, and she's hopeful that something good may rise out of the ashes. However, Gail is caught in the middle when tempers rise between Dave and resentful Tom. Sue's excited about her new business venture 'Adorable Again', but her plans are eclipsed when she runs into John's wife Beth and discovers all is not well with John.
| 6 | "Episode 6" | Kay Mellor | Kay Mellor | 7 February 2018 | 5.80 |
Waking up in their Spanish hotel Linda tells her friends about Micky's drunken violence towards her over the years of their marriage and events on the night he went over the side of the ship. At the police station she identifies his body though afterwards she has another admission for Gail and Sue before getting a shock herself, which only adds to her troubles. Sue comes up with an idea to free Linda for all time, requiring the three friends to work together to bury the past.

== Reception ==
On the review aggregator website Rotten Tomatoes, the series holds an approval rating of 86% with an average rating of 7.3/10 based on 14 reviews. The website's critical consensus reads, "Girlfriends offers an honest -- and frequently hilarious -- look at a time of life too often marginalized on TV, with wonderfully well-acted results." Metacritic, which uses a weighted average, assigned the season a score of 87 out of 100 based on 4 reviews, indicating "universal acclaim".
