= St Mary's Menston Catholic Voluntary Academy =

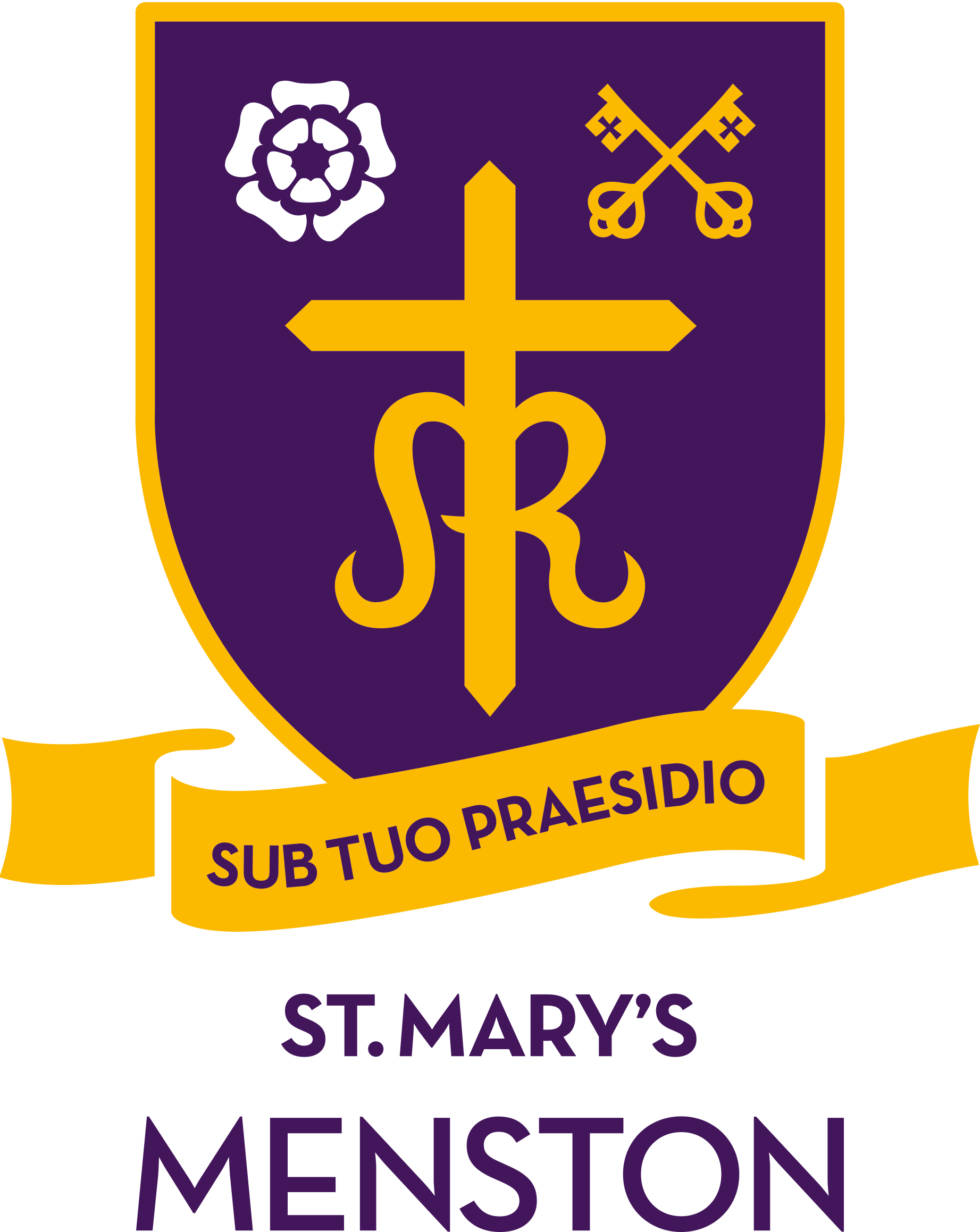

Location
- Bradford Road; Menston, West Yorkshire, LS29 6AE; England; 53.883847°N 1.727436°W

Information
- Former name: St Mary's Catholic High School
- Type: Academy
- Motto: Latin: Sub tuo praesidio (Under your protection)
- Religious affiliation: Roman Catholic
- Established: 1964
- Local authority: Leeds City Council
- Oversight: Roman Catholic Diocese of Leeds
- Trust: The Bishop Wheeler Catholic Academy Trust
- Specialist: Sports College
- Department for Education URN: 139351 Tables
- Ofsted: Reports
- Head teacher: Margaret Hattersley
- Gender: Mixed
- Age range: 11–18
- Enrolment: 1,196 (2019)
- Capacity: 1,096
- Campus size: 17 acres (6.9 ha)
- Houses: Clitherow; Dickenson; Fisher; Gwyn; More; Postgate; Wharton
- Colours: Purple, yellow, grey
- Website: www.stmarysmenston.org

St Mary's Menston Catholic Voluntary Academy (formerly St Mary's Catholic High School) is an 11–18 mixed, Roman Catholic, secondary school and sixth form with academy status in Menston, West Yorkshire, England, within the part of Menston included in the City of Leeds. It was established in 1964 and adopted its present name after becoming an academy on 1 March 2013. It is part of The Bishop Wheeler Catholic Academy Trust and is located in the Roman Catholic Diocese of Leeds.

== History ==
=== Early years: 1964–1972 ===
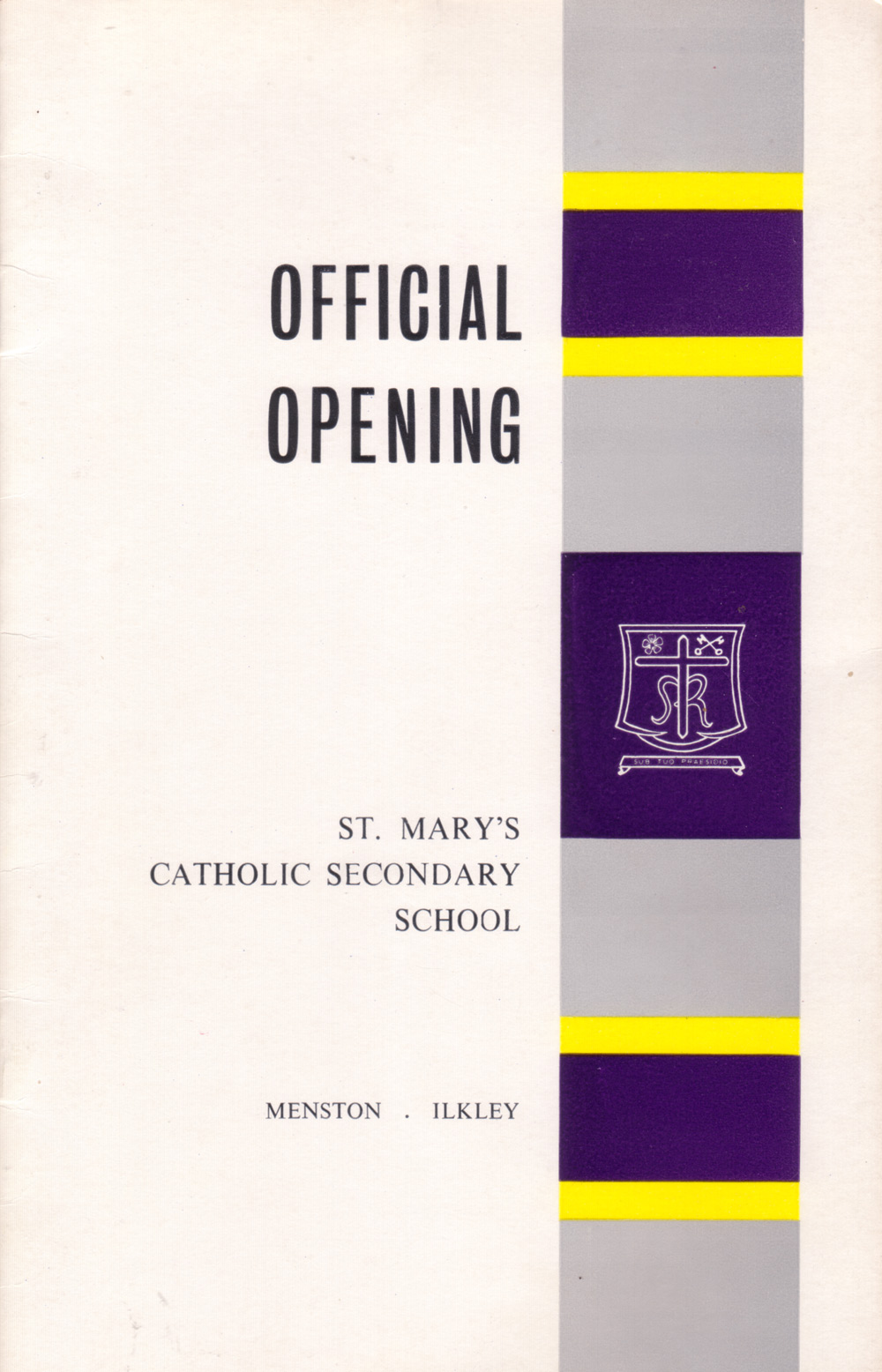
Programme cover from the official opening of St Mary's, Menston, 3 July 1965

Canon Charles J Murray, Governor, negotiated with the West Riding County Council and Department of Education and Science for forward planning of the school and had by 1960 secured a site.

In October 1960, it was announced that a school would be built in the 1962-63 building programme, and the governors invited Weightman & Bullen, to prepare plans for a three-form entry secondary school. At that time no more than 75 boys and girls per year were expected so the plans were for a building for 360 pupils in the initial contract, with provision for extension to 450. West Riding County Council acquired 13 acres (53,000 m^{2}) of land from the Regional Hospital Board and work started on the site in July 1962.

The original buildings, to which pupils were admitted in November 1964, were officially blessed and opened by George Dwyer, Roman Catholic Bishop of Leeds on 3 July 1965. The first chairman of governors, who presided was E. Malone. St Mary's opening led to a reorganisation of Catholic schools in the area, as they became primary schools. The school colours of purple, yellow and grey have remained unchanged since the opening.

Subjects available in 1965 included:

- English
- Mathematics
- Science
- History
- Geography
- French
- Art and Craft
- Woodwork
- Metalwork
- Technical Drawing
- Housecraft
- Needlework
- Physical Education

The Morse building (named after Saint Henry Morse) can be seen as the school is approached from the main road. The three units comprised the hall, small hall, Chapel, and gymnasium, a three-storey academic and administrative block and practical areas. The total cost was £180,000 of which the Local Authority contributed £39,000. The Chapel, financed without grant aid, cost a further £9,000. Throughout the 1960s the Diocesan Schools Commission and the West Riding County Council recognised that the only sound future for the school would be as part of a comprehensive system, and to provide a sufficient range of facilities it would have to grow.

=== Expansion: 1973–1979 ===
St Mary's is well placed for transport and the catchment area was enlarged. The school became five-form entry with an age range of 11 to 18 years, and the first all-ability intake started in 1973. This required further buildings and a contract was signed in January 1972 for a further 674 sq. m. two-storey block, which was completed for the increased intake. This cost £60,000 of which the LEA contributed £6,000. Further plans were made to accommodate the annual build·up of pupils. An increase in specialist teaching rooms was required, and as the original building had only one or two for each subject it was impossible to create integrated departments without remodeling many older rooms for a changed use. This created problems for the builders and the school, as teaching had to continue throughout the construction.

In October 1973, work on a new contract costing £442,000 began and continued until October 1975. The LEA's contribution was £132,000. It included extensions to the library, staff and administrative rooms, added a further 1,905 sq. m. and accommodated more than 350 extra pupils. The 1962 site was now too small and more land was acquired. The playing fields covered 16 acres (65,000 m^{2}) in addition to land occupied by buildings and paved areas.

Construction on the sixth form centre, the Clitherow Building (named after Saint Margaret Clitherow) started in May 1978 and provided another 676 sq. m. at a cost of £117,000. It provided classrooms, seminar rooms, a common room and two laboratories. The school was fully comprehensive from September 1979, with a five/six form entry, varying from 150 to 180 per year and 950 pupils on roll. There were 50 members of staff. 14 subjects were offered to the sixth form. The Clitherow Building was blessed by William Wheeler, Bishop of Leeds, in November 1979.

=== Hume Building: 1980–2001 ===
The school celebrated its silver anniversary (25 years) in 1989 with a special Mass. In June 1993, the choir of St. Mary's appeared in Black Daisies for the Bride, a BBC 2 television film written by Tony Harrison for National Alzeheimer's Week, filmed in High Royds Hospital, Menston.

St Mary's became a Sports College specialist school in 2000. As a specialist sports college, St Mary's has a team of coaches who give their services to 54 other schools in a sports partnership with St Mary's.

The opening of the Hume building (named after Basil Cardinal Hume) by David Konstant, Bishop of Leeds, took place in February 2001. Jack Lunn Construction constructed a three-storey, steel-framed extension that allowed St Mary's to take 1,100 pupils. The project took 14 months to complete and cost £1.7 million. The building has a traditional brick-and-block facade, concrete floors and a flat roof.

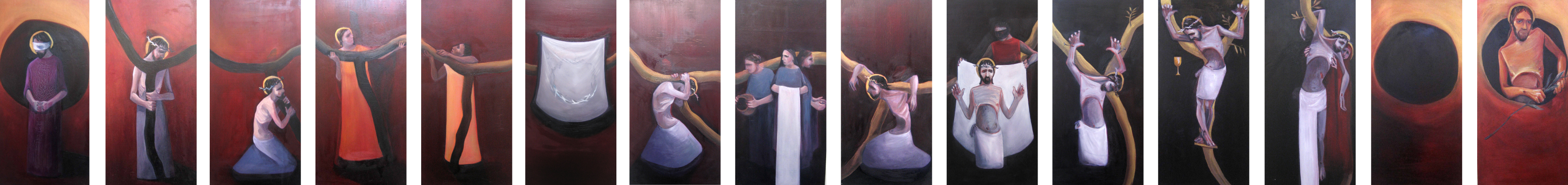
Stations of the Cross Painting in the Chapel of St Mary's Menston, 2000

=== 2002–2012 ===
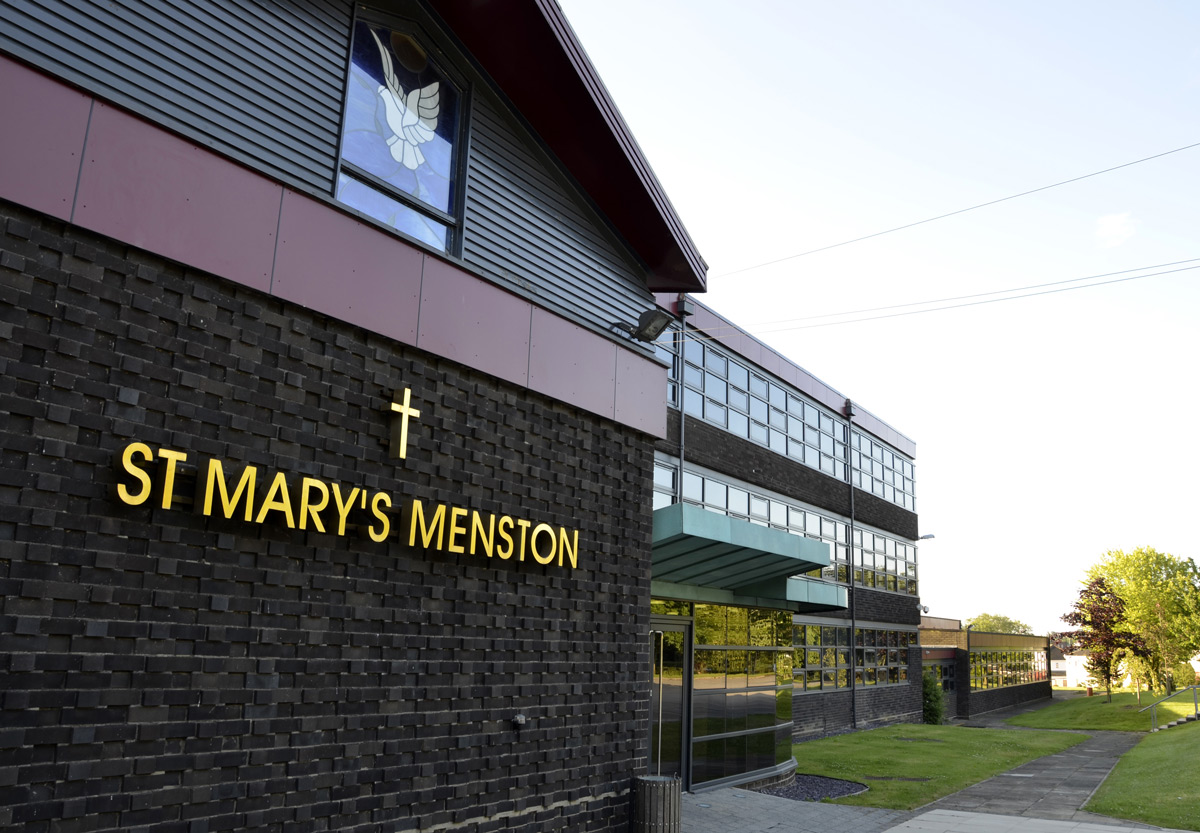
The visitor entrance to the school, 2011. Note the stained glass window in the Chapel

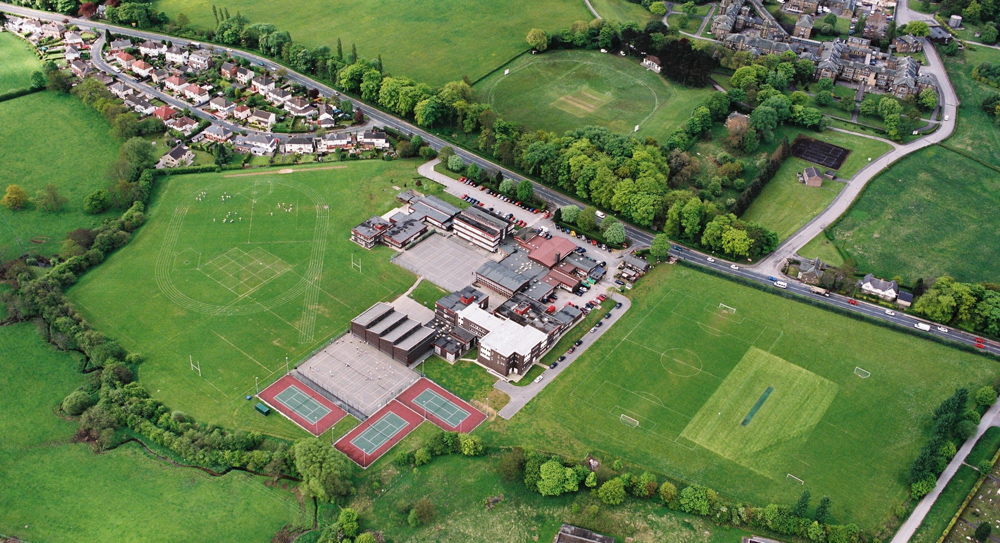
Aerial photograph, 2003, showing the entire school site

In 2003, the school was awarded £792,000 to extend its inter-school sports partnership. St Mary's achieved Artsmark Silver in 2004. The school marked its 40th anniversary in October 2004 with a whole school photograph of pupils and staff. February 2005 saw a week-long visit by 8 Chinese students and two staff from ShiXi High School, Shanghai.

In 2006, a stained glass artwork of a dove was created in the Chapel. New entrances for both visitors and pupils opened in September 2008. In 2009, St Mary's received the International School Award presented by BBC newsreader George Alagiah. March 2011 saw the opening of a floodlit artificial turf football pitch. It was opened by Sir Trevor Brooking, the Football Association's director of football development. The pitch was part of a £750,000 investment in sport at the school which will also saw all remaining grass pitches drained. The project was part funded by a £325,000 grant from the Football Foundation.

In May 2011, a team from St. Mary's were the overall winners of the Geographical Association 2011 Blancathra Worldwise Challenge trophy. The school received the ICT Mark in June 2011 and was awarded Youth Sport Trust Gold Partner status in March 2012.

=== Academy: 2012–present ===
In March 2012, plans were announced for Catholic schools across the Leeds Diocese to investigate teaming up to form trust academies that would no longer be under local authority control.

The Governing Bodies of St Mary's and four other schools considered a proposal of converting to Academy status in 2013 and forming together a Multi-Academy Trust. A consultation period occurred between September and October 2012. The academy conversion took place on 1 March 2013.

St Mary's is part of The Bishop Wheeler Catholic Academy Trust. Thomas Rothwell and Catherine Garrett took over from Mr R Pritchard as acting headteachers in April 2013. The Office for Standards in Education, Children's Services and Skills (Ofsted) inspection in November 2014 graded St Mary's as Grade 1 (Outstanding).

Darren Beardsley was appointed as headteacher in 2014, taking over in September of that year. He remained as headteacher until 2021.

As of September 2021, Margaret Hattersley took over as acting headteacher.

== Admissions ==
St Mary's is a comprehensive school. The school is oversubscribed.

Pupils come from the Leeds, Bradford and North Yorkshire areas, although most come from the Roman Catholic communities of towns to the north-west of Leeds. The school serves a socially mixed area. Although Menston is in the City of Bradford metropolitan district the school is in the Guiseley and Rawdon ward of the City of Leeds metropolitan district.

== School site ==
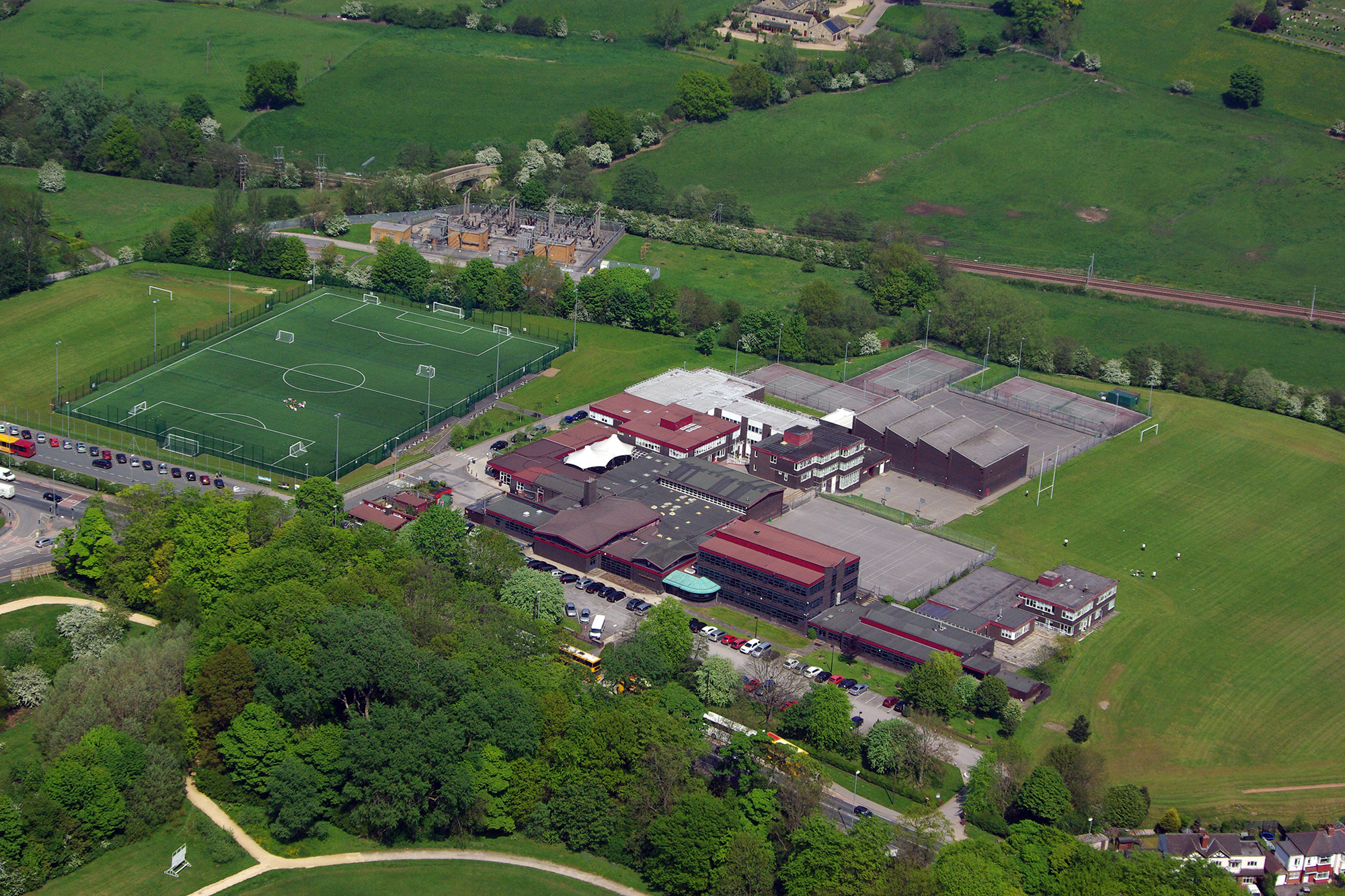
Aerial photograph, 2012, showing the artificial turf pitch that was built in 2011

The school site comprises 17 acres (69,000 m^{2}) in a semi rural location on the periphery of the village of Menston. The site is bordered by moorland, streams and pasture. The former High Royds Hospital (now a housing development) is opposite the school.

== Curriculum ==
The pupils work with over 85 teachers supported by learning assistants, administrative, technical and maintenance staff and a school chaplain. There is a two-week timetable. As prescribed by the National Curriculum, St Mary's students follow two Key Stages up to the age of 16. St Mary's pupils start Key Stage 4 in Year Nine and generally take ten General Certificate of Secondary Education (GCSE) tests in Year Eleven (aged 15–16). They have a choice of A-levels in the optional sixth form. The majority of pupils go on to higher education following the completion of their A-levels at the end of Year Thirteen (aged 17–18).

The seven form groups in each year are named after the Catholic martyrs of the English Reformation.

Form	Named after
Clitherow	Margaret Clitherow
Dickenson	Blessed Francis Dickenson
Fisher	John Fisher
Gwyn	Richard Gwyn
More	Thomas More
Postgate	Nicholas Postgate
Wharton	Christopher Wharton

== Extracurricular activities ==
=== Performing arts ===
There is a Key Stage 4 & Sixth Form production each Spring and a Key Stage 3 production each Summer. In July 2011, St Mary's won 12 awards at the Wharfedale Theatre Festival for its production of A Midsummer Night's Dream.

Year	School Production
2002	Return to the Forbidden Planet
2003	A Christmas Carol
2005	Oliver!
2006	The Comedy of Errors
2007	A Man for All Seasons
2008	Les Misérables
2010	Jesus Christ Superstar
2011	A Midsummer Night's Dream
2012	The Sound of Music
2012	Snow White and the Seven Dwarfs (Key Stage 3 production)
2013	Miss Saigon
2013	Childhood...in 3 Short Plays including Hansel and Gretel and Little Red (Key Stage 3 production)
2014	Macbeth
2014	Charlie and the Chocolate Factory (Key Stage 3 production)
2015	We Will Rock You
2015	Flour Babies (Key Stage 3 production)
2016	The Crucible
2016	A Midsummer Night's Dream (Key Stage 3 production)
2017	Fame
2017	Alice in Wonderland (Key Stage 3 production)
2018	Lord of the Flies
2018	Our Day Out (Key Stage 3 production)
2019	Legally Blonde
2019	The Lion, the Witch and the Wardrobe (Key Stage 3 production)
2020	Grease
2022	Joseph and the Amazing Technicolor Dreamcoat

== Academic performance ==
In 2016, St Mary's achieved the highest Attainment 8 score among all state-funded schools in Leeds.

In 2010, 2011, 2012, 2013 and 2014 the school achieved the highest GCSE results amongst state schools in Leeds.

In 2011 the A-level results were in the top 200 nationally and St Mary's was ranked 20th in The Independent's Top 100 Comprehensive Schools (in England) at A-level.

In 2009, the school received the highest A-level results in the Leeds LEA, the second highest in West Yorkshire and was ranked 19th highest among English comprehensive schools, based on A-level results.

== International links ==
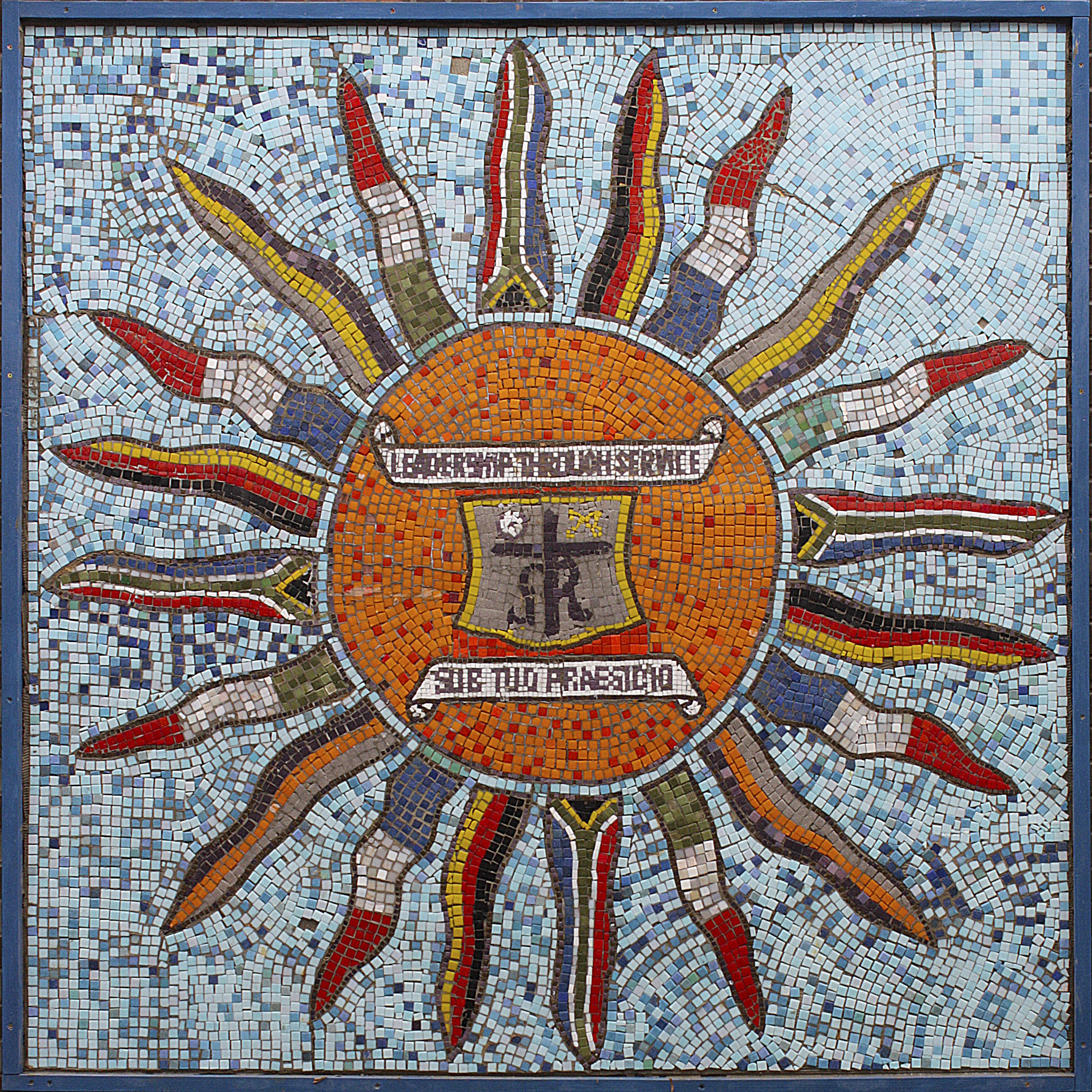
St Mary's International Links mosaic, 2009. The sun's rays represent the various international links St Mary's enjoys.

St Mary's has links with schools worldwide. The most notable of these is the Bambisanani Partnership, which refers to the partnership between St Mary's and Mnyakanya High School in KwaZulu-Natal, South Africa (Bambisanani being the Zulu word for "working hand in hand").

The Bambisanani Partnership has a key focus of using sport as a catalyst to promote education, leadership, health and global understanding.

The 25th anniversary of the link between St Mary's and Franziskus-Gymnasium in Germany, was marked in 2011, with 1,420 students having taken part over the years. St Mary's works with Sefwi Wiawso Senior High in Western Ghana as part of the six school Connecting Classrooms project.

Schools with which St Mary's currently work include:

Country	Details
France	Lycée Murat – Issoire
Germany	Franziskus Gymnasium – Vossenack
Ghana	Sefwi Wiawso Senior High – Western Ghana
South Africa	Mnyakanya High School – Kwa Zulu Natal

== Notable former pupils ==
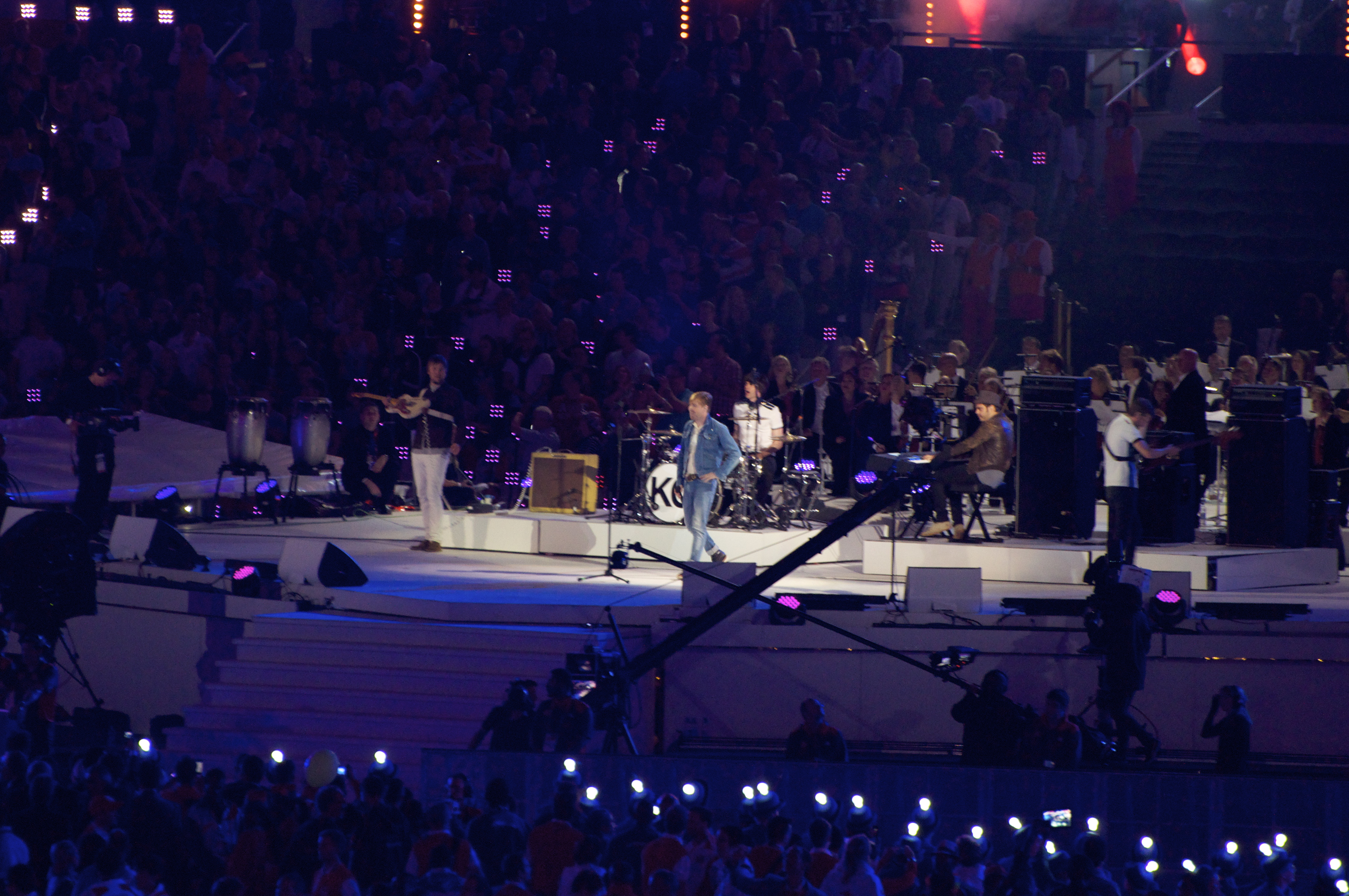
Three founding members of the band The Kaiser Chiefs; Nick Hodgson, Nick Baines and Simon Rix met in the same class, aged 11

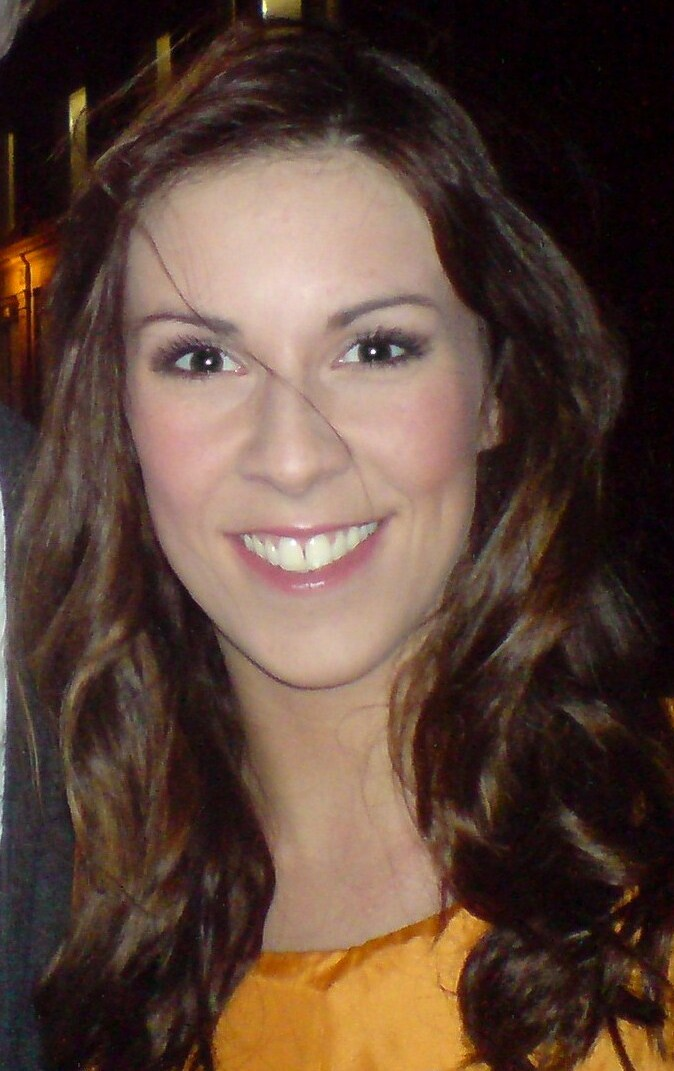
Verity Rushworth, television and musical theatre actress

- Matthew Lewis, actor
- Simon Rix, bass player for the Kaiser Chiefs
- Nick Baines, keyboardist for the Kaiser Chiefs
- Nick Hodgson, musician, frontman and rhythm guitarist for Everyone Says Hi and former drummer for the Kaiser Chiefs
- Christian Cooke, actor
- Tom Taiwo, professional footballer
- Joe Sayers, professional cricketer
- Stuart Murphy, Sky Director of Entertainment Channels/first Controller of BBC Three
- Jordan Sinnott, professional footballer
- Tim Linley, professional cricketer
- David Wigley, professional cricketer
- Sean Conlon, member of boyband 5ive
- Verity Rushworth, actress
- Christopher Smith, actor and producer
- Anthony Lewis, actor
- Luke Hendrie, professional footballer
- James Keinhorst, professional rugby league footballer
- Nadine Mulkerrin, actress
- Josh Inglis, professional cricketer

== Headteachers ==
St Mary's has had six (permanent) headteachers:

- John Dalton (1964–1987)
- Tony Duffin (1987–1997)
- Michael Pyle (1997–2009)
- Catherine McMahon (Acting Headteacher) (2010–2011)
- Robert Pritchard (2011 – April 2013)
- Thomas Rothwell and Catherine Garrett (acting headteachers) (April 2013 – August 2014)
- Darren Beardsley (September 2014–August 2021)
- Margaret Hattersley (acting headteacher) (September 2021–present)
