= Our Boys (1993 play) =

Play written by Jonathan Guy Lewis

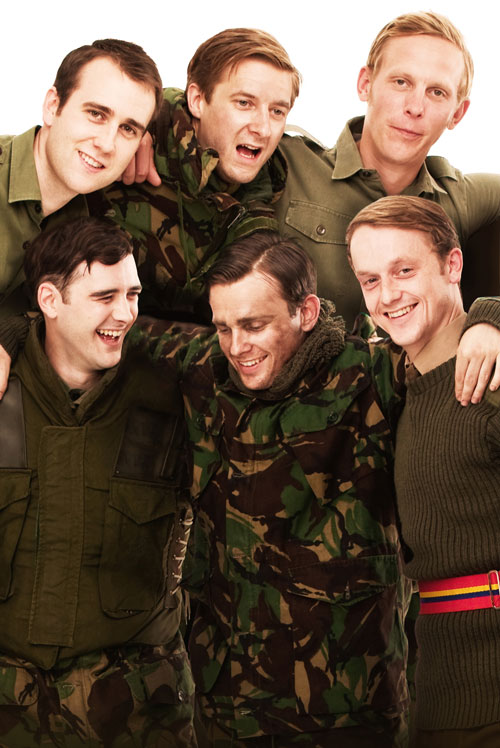
The cast of the 2012 West End production of "Our Boys"

Our Boys is a play in two acts written by the actor Jonathan Guy Lewis, credited under his pen name Jonathan Lewis, first performed in London on 13 May 1993 and subsequently performed in Derby and the Donmar Warehouse, London.

It was being revived in the West End in October 2012.

== Performances ==
Our Boys was first performed in London on 13 May 1993 at the Cockpit Theatre and subsequently revived in a production that originated at Derby Playhouse (now known as Derby Theatre) and then transferred to the Donmar Warehouse where it ran from 11 April to 13 May 1995. The production led to the play winning the Best Fringe Play award in the Writers' Guild of Great Britain Awards, and the play was published by Samuel French and remains in print.

Subsequent productions have been performed at various fringe theatres by both amateur and professional theatre groups and companies.

The Scottish premiere opened at the Scottish Storytelling Centre on 13 November 2002 produced by Theatre Enigma.

On 15 June 2012, it was announced that the play would receive its West End premiere at the Duchess Theatre on 3 October 2012, with preview performances starting on 26 September 2012, in a new production directed by David Grindley, designed by Jonatham Fensom, with lighting by Jason Taylor and sound by Gregory Clarke. Cast confirmed upon announcement were Cian Barry as Keith, Arthur Darvill as Parry, Laurence Fox as Joe and Matthew Lewis as Mick. The show is produced by James Seabright, Jenny Topper, Sue Scott Davison and Lee Menzies.

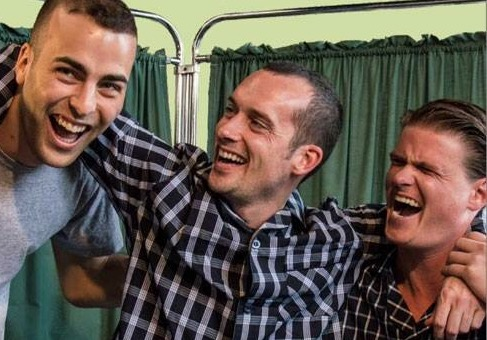
Ian (Patrick Marlin), POM (Lee Cook) and Joe (Adam Tuominen) from the 2017 Australian production of "Our Boys"

The Australian debut directed by Dave Simms was performed at the Adelaide Arts Theatre by the Adelaide Repertory Theatre Company from 31 August to 9 September 2017 and starred Adam Tuominen as Joe, Lee Cook as POM, James Edwards as Parry, Patrick Marlin as Ian, Nick Duddy as Mick and Leighton Vogt as Keith.

== Roles (with names of actors who created them in the first production) ==
- Joe (David Hounslow ) – Lloyd Owen took over when the play was revived at Derby Playhouse and the Donmar Theatre in 1995.
- Keith (Sean Gilder)
- Parry (Perry Fenwick)
- Mick (Thomas Craig)
- Ian (Jake Wood)
- POM – Potential Officer Menzies (Matthew Radford) – Marston Bloom took over when the play was revived at Derby Playhouse and the Donmar Theatre in 1995.

== Synopsis ==
The play is set in Ward 9 Bay 4 of the Queen Elizabeth Military Hospital, Woolwich, London, England. The action begins in spring 1984. Joe, a victim of the Hyde Park bomb, has been in the hospital for 18 months, longer than the other characters. The play opens as he argues with Keith, a Northern Irish private with leg pains, about having agreed that POM (a young potential officer and thus a threatening authority figure) can move into the ward to free up a private room for a Major's wife to have an operation. Following POM's arrival, Joe leaves for a rare night out, whilst Mick and Parry enter from a neighbouring ward in wheelchairs. The remaining group discuss their injuries and diagnoses.

In the second scene, Ian and POM are both talking in their sleep during vivid dreams, keeping Keith awake. Joe returns from his escapades and claims to have slept with the Major's wife in what used to be POM's private room. Scenes three and four see the group poring over correspondence magazines, which they use to try to find pen pals and potential girlfriends; they conspire to create a fake reply to Mick, making him think there is an exotic girlfriend keen to meet him.

In scene five, Keith and POM discuss how Keith got the leg injury which has hospitalised him, and which the doctors are struggling to accurately diagnose. The group present Ian with a birthday cake, on the wrong day. Later they play an improvised game 'Beerhunter', a pun on the cult film The Deer Hunter. Having alcohol in the hospital is a breach of the strict military rules under which they live, so when a scuffle leads to Keith sustaining an injury, the act closes with the group fearful of the possible implications of their actions.

In act two, despite the group having agreed to stick to a story which explains the injuries sustained from their 'beer game' without reference to alcohol being involved, it appears that the army are aware of what truly happened, and that the consequence will be that Parry is dismissed from the army. Keith continues to worry about his future as his illness remains a mystery, and the doctors suggest his pain could be purely psychological. As the investigation by the hospital authorities conclude, one of the group is revealed to have betrayed the others, and a violent argument ensues, with Joe lashing out as his authority over the group has been threatened.

The final scene occurs two weeks later, by which time only Joe is left resident in the ward, with POM restored to his private room. He visits Joe and through both reminiscing about how they both wound up in hospital, Joe is spurred on to talk for the first time about the terrorist incident from which he is still suffering post-traumatic stress disorder.

== Notes ==
- Wardle, Irving The Independent 1995, review of original production
