= Eshowe High School =

Coordinates: 28.8905°S 31.4600°E

Hoërskool Eshowe
- Eshowe, KwaZulu-Natal; South Africa

Information
- Type: Public
- Motto: Service
- Established: 1890
- Locale: Suburban
- Headmaster: E. Curtis
- Exam board: KZN
- Grades: 8–12
- Enrollment: 700
- Houses: Pearson; Shepstone; Chelmsford
- Colours: Bottle Green & White
- Mascot: Bavuzah
- Pupil-teacher ratio: 23:1
- Website: https://www.eshowehigh.org.za/

Eshowe High School is a public co-educational high school located in Eshowe, KwaZulu-Natal, South Africa.

== History ==
Eshowe's first school was opened by Bishop W.M. Carter in his home in the 1890s. After a few years operating from the town's public library, the first school building was completed by 1902 and the separate high school campus was built and launched in 1957. In 1994 the school opened its doors.

In 2015 the Eshowe High School was featured in Destiny (magazine)'s Good Schools Report.
