= Jonathan Guy Lewis =

English actor (born 1963)

- Born: Jonathan Guy Lewis; 20 May 1963 (age 63); Woolwich, London, England
- Other name: Jonathan Lewis
- Occupation: Actor
- Years active: 1992–present
- Partner: Imogen Stubbs
- Children: 1

Jonathan Guy Lewis (born 20 May 1963) is a British actor known for his role as Chris Hammond in London's Burning.

== Early life ==
Lewis was educated at St Dunstan's College, After attending university, Lewis was an officer trainer at Sandhurst before a recurring back injury led to his discharge from the army at 22 years old. Lewis then enrolled in drama school to begin his new career.

== Career ==
Lewis's first major acting role was the role of Sgt. Chris McCleod in Soldier Soldier. His most recent television series roles were on Skins and Endeavour.

Lewis has also worked as a writer and director. His most notable work as a writer is the award-winning play Our Boys, which was staged at the Donmar Warehouse in 1995 and revived at the Duchess Theatre in 2012. In 2015, Lewis co starred in the revival of Arthur Miller's A View from the Bridge.

== Select television works ==
- Holby City, 2003, as Anthony Woods (3 episodes)
- London's Burning, 1998–2001, as Chris Hammond (25 episodes)
- Coronation Street, 1999, as Ian Bentley (43 episodes)
- Soldier Soldier, 1996–1997, as Sgt Chris McLeod (17 episodes)
- Heartbeat, 2005 as Peter Roberts (1 episode)
- Silent Witness, 2006 Series 10 Episodes 9 & 10 Schism Parts 1 & 2 as Interrogator (2 Episodes)
