= Some Kind of Life =

- Genre: Drama
- Written by: Kay Mellor
- Directed by: Julian Jarrold
- Starring: Jane Horrocks; Ray Stevenson; Gwen Taylor; Matthew Lewis
- Music by: David Ferguson
- Country of origin: United Kingdom
- Original language: English

Production
- Executive producer: Pippa Cross
- Producer: Bill Boyes
- Running time: 102 minutes

Original release
- Network: ITV
- Release: 11 August 1996

Some Kind of Life is an ITV's 1995 TV drama written by Kay Mellor and directed by Julian Jarrold, starring Jane Horrocks and Ray Stevenson, it was aired on 11 August 1996 and produced by Granada Television for the ITV Network.

== Synopsis ==
In this drama, Alison (Jane Horrocks) is a young wife and mother whose life is turned upside down after her beloved husband, Steve (Ray Stevenson), is involved in a motorcycle crash, suffers massive head trauma, and regresses to a mental and emotional age of 5. Much of the story centres on the mundane aspects of being forced to deal with the loss of her husband as a man and the acquisition of him as a child. Time passes and things do not improve. Slowly, even Steve's closest friends begin withdrawing their support. Eventually, Alison is forced to decide whether she will continue to stick by Steve, or whether she will go on without him.
