= Hollyoaks Later series 2 =

UK television soap opera (Sep–Oct 2009)

Hollyoaks Later
- Series 2
- Hollyoaks Later series 2 opening title, showing Lydia Kelly's eye
- No. of episodes: 5

Release
- Original network: E4
- Original release: 28 September – 2 October 2009

Series chronology
- ← Previous; Series 1 Next → Series 3

The second series of Hollyoaks Later is a British television series which ran for one week starting 28 September 2009. Hollyoaks Later is a spin-off of the Channel 4 soap opera Hollyoaks.

== Development ==
It was revealed on 17 April 2009 that former Hollyoaks producer Bryan Kirkwood would produce the show.

On 3 August 2009, it was announced that Nicola Stapleton would play Savannah, the estranged friend of Cindy Cunningham. The series will feature "an unlikely wedding", "the Ashworths attending a music festival", "a trip to London for the McQueen clan" and "a dramatic boot camp plot with Sarah, Zoë and Lydia which ends in tragedy". On 15 August 2009, it was reported that Sarah, Zoë and Lydia would be involved in a storyline which sees the three characters skydiving, however one of the parachutes will be "sabotaged" by a jealous Lydia, which will lead to the death of either Sarah or Zoë.

For the scenes inside the plane before the skydiving, the production team used a storage area in Tatenhill Airfield, Staffordshire.

On 26 August 2009, it was announced singer Bonnie Tyler would guest in the series as herself.

In September, the Hollyoaks website released a trailer for the series. It was also revealed that Alison Burrows had been cast as Kathleen McQueen, the mother of Theresa.

== Plot ==
The series follows four stories. Rhys, Hannah and Josh Ashworth head off to a music festival. Whilst there, Rhys and Hannah are tempted by love interests Imogen and Jamie, however the pair are not as nice as they seem. Jacqui McQueen and Darren Osborne try their best to convince Tony Hutchinson and Cindy Cunningham not to get married, and Cindy is less than pleased at the appearance of former best friend Savannah. Theresa and Michaela McQueen set off to London where Theresa has an interview with a modelling agency. As they face living on the streets of London, Theresa decides to visit her mother. Jealous Lydia Hart follows girlfriend Sarah Barnes on a camping trip where she finds her getting closer to Zoe Carpenter. Her jealousy leads to a chain of events and the death of one of the group.

== Cast ==
The following is a list of cast members who appeared in the series: Actor Daniel Goldenberg went on to reprise his role as Kingsley in Hollyoaks briefly in November 2009. In 2010, Finn Jones and Kyle Rees also returned to play their characters of Jamie and Blue.

Character	Actor
Jacqui McQueen	Claire Cooper
Michaela McQueen	Hollie Jay Bowes
Hannah Ashworth	Emma Rigby
Sarah Barnes	Loui Batley
Zoe Carpenter	Zoë Lister
Lydia Hart	Lydia Kelly
Theresa McQueen	Jorgie Porter
Cindy Cunningham	Stephanie Waring
Carmel Valentine	Gemma Merna
Josh Ashworth	Sonny Flood
Rhys Ashworth	Andrew Moss
Tony Hutchinson	Nick Pickard
Darren Osborne	Ashley Taylor Dawson
Steph Cunningham	Carley Stenson
Gilly Roach	Anthony Quinlan
Fernando Fernandez	Jeronimo Best
Mike Barnes	Tony Hirst
Holly Cunningham	Lydia Waters
Kathleen McQueen	Alison Burrows
Charlotte Lau	Amy Yamazaki
Savannah Madeiros	Nicola Stapleton
Jamie	Finn Jones
Kev	James Cartwright
Imogen	Holly Gilbert
Wayne Connor	Ashley Campbell
Kingsley	Daniel Goldenberg
Emma	Emily Plumtree
Blue	Kyle Rees
Herself	Bonnie Tyler

== Ratings ==
Hollyoaks Later	Run time	Original airdate	Viewers	
Hollyoaks Later	Run time	Original airdate	E4	E4 +1
Episode 1	1 hour	28 September 2009	474k (2.1%)	338k (2.2%)
Episode 2	1 hour	29 September 2009	519k (2.5%)	279k (1.8%)
Episode 3	1 hour	30 September 2009	421k (2.1%)	234k (1.6%)
Episode 4	1 hour	1 October 2009	428k (2.1%)	226k (1.5%)
Episode 5	1 hour	2 October 2009	510k (2.4%)	331k (2.1%)
