= English Eccentrics =

English eccentrics may refer to:

- English Eccentrics (1983-2000), textile design and fashion label by Helen David
- English Eccentrics (opera), 1964 opera by Malcolm Williamson
- The English Eccentrics, 1933 book by Edith Sitwell
- English Eccentrics and Eccentricities, 1866 book by John Timbs
