= Thomas Byerley (journalist) =

Compiler of Percy Anecdotes (1789–1826)

Thomas Byerley (1789–1826), also known by the pseudonyms of Reuben Percy and Stephen Collet, was an English journalist and compiler of the Percy Anecdotes.

== Life ==
He was born in Brompton, North Yorkshire, England in 1789 and was the brother of Sir John Byerley. Becoming a writer, he was editor of the Literary Chronicle, and assistant editor of The Star newspaper. He was also editor of The Mirror of Literature, Amusement, and Instruction, from 1823 until his death, on 28 July 1826.

== Works ==
Under the pseudonym of Stephen Collet, Byerley published Relics of Literature, London, 1823, 8vo, a collection of miscellanies, including a long article, reprinted in 1875, on graphology. He is best known for The Percy Anecdotes, 20 vols., London, 1821–3, 12mo. These volumes, which came out in forty-four monthly parts, were supposedly written by "Sholto and Reuben Percy, brothers of the Benedictine monastery of Mount Benger". Reuben Percy was Byerley, and Sholto Percy was Joseph Clinton Robertson. The name of the collection was taken from the Percy coffee-house in Rathbone Place in Fitzrovia, where Byerley and Robertson used to meet. The Anecdotes were reprinted in 2 vols. in the Chandos Library with a preface by John Timbs. The "Brothers Percy" also compiled London, or Interesting Memorials of its Rise, Progress, and Present State, 3 vols., London, 1823.
