= English Eccentrics and Eccentricities =

Book by John Timbs

English Eccentrics and Eccentricities was written by John Timbs and published first in two volumes by Richard Bentley in New Burlington Street, London, in 1866.

It is a source of biographical incident on unusual people of the late 18th and early 19th centuries, from celebrities to recluses, religious notables to country astrologers, pop authors to tragedians. Historian James Gregory describes English Eccentrics and Eccentricities as a "popular mid-Victorian collection of eccentric lives".

As Timbs lays out his purpose in his preface:

Gentle Reader, a few words before we introduce you to our Modern Eccentrics. They may be odd company: yet, how often do we find eccentricity in the minds of persons of good understanding. Their sayings and doings, it is true, may not rank as high among the delicacies of intellectual epicures as the Strasburg pies among the dishes described in the Almanach des Gourmands; but they possess attractions in proportion to the degree in which 'man favours wonders.' Swift has remarked, that 'a little grain of the romance is no ill ingredient to preserve and exalt the dignity of human nature, without which it is apt to degenerate into everything that is sordid, vicious, and low.' Into the latter extremes Eccentricity is occasionally apt to run, somewhat like certain fermenting liquors which cannot be checked in their acidifying courses.

Into such headlong excesses our Eccentrics rarely stray; and one of our objects in sketching their ways, is to show that with oddity of character may co-exist much goodness of heart; and your strange fellow, though, according to the lexicographer, he be outlandish, odd, queer, and eccentric, may possess claims to our notice which the man who is ever studying the fitness of things would not so readily present.

Many books of character have been published which have recorded the acts, sayings, and fortunes of Eccentrics. The instances in the present Work are, for the most part, drawn from our own time, so as to present points of novelty which could not so reasonably be expected in portraits of older date. They are motley-minded and grotesque in many instances; and from their rare accidents may be gathered many a lesson of thrift, as well as many a scene of humour to laugh at; while some realize the well remembered couplet on the near alliance of wits to madness.

A glance at the accompanying Table of Contents, and the Index to each volume, will, it is hoped, convey a fair idea of the number and variety of characters and incidents to be found in this gallery of Modern Eccentrics.

It should be added, that in the preparation of this Work, the Author has availed himself of the most trustworthy materials for the staple of his narratives, which, in certain cases, he has preferred giving ipsissimis verbis of his authorities to "re-writing" them, as it is termed; a process which rarely adds to the veracity of story-telling, but, on the other hand, often gives a colour to the incidents which the original narrator never intended to convey. The object has been to render the book truthful as well as entertaining.

== Volume One ==
The contents are as follows:

=== Wealth and Fashion ===
- The Beckfords and Fonthill
- Alderman Beckford's Monument Speech, in Guildhall
- Beau Brummel
- Sir Lumley Skeffington, Bart
- "Romeo" Coates
- Abraham Newland
- The Spendthrift Squire of Halston, John Mytton
- Lord Petersham
- The King and Queen of the Sandwich Islands
- Sir Edward Bering's Luckless Courtship
- Gretna Green Marriages
- The Agapemone, or Abode of Love
- Singular Scotch Ladies
- Mrs. Bond, of Hackney
- John Ward, the Hackney Miser
- "Poor Man of Mutton"
- Lord Kenyon's Parsimony
- Mary Moser, the Flower-painter
- The Eccentric Miss Banks
- Thomas Cooke, the Miser, of Pentonville
- Thomas Cooke, the Turkey Merchant
- "Lady Lewson," of Clerkenwell
- Profits of Dust-sifting and Dust-heaps
- Sir John Dineley, Bart
- The Rothschilds
- A Legacy of Half-a-million of Money
- Eccentricities of the Earl of Bridgewater
- The Denisons, and the Conyngham Family
- "Dog Jennings"
- Baron Ward's Remarkable Career
- A Costly House-warming
- Devonshire Eccentrics
- Hannah Snell, the Female Soldier
- Lady Archer

=== Delusions, Impostures, and Fanatic Missions ===
- Modern Alchemists
- Jack Adams, the Astrologer
- The Woman-hating Cavendish
- Modern Astrology "Witch Pickles"
- Hannah Green; or, "Ling Bob"
- Oddities of Lady Hester Stanhope
- Hermits and Eremitical Life
- The Recluses of Llangollen
- Snuff-taking Legacies
- Burial Bequests
- Burials on Box Hill and Leith Hill
  - Peter Labilliere
  - Richard Hull
- Jeremy Bentham's Bequest of his Remains
- The Marquis of Anglesey's Leg
- The Cottle Church
- Horace Walpole's Chattels saved by a Talisman
- Norwood Gipsies
- "Cunning Mary," of Clerkenwell
- "Jerusalem Whalley"
- Father Mathew and the Temperance Movement
- Eccentric Preachers
- Irving a Millenarian
- A Trio of Fanatics
  - William Sharp
  - Jacob Bryan
  - Richard Brothers
- The Spenceans
- Joanna Southcote, and the Coming of Shiloh
- The Founder of Mormonism
- Huntington, the Preacher
- Amen–Peter Isnell
- Strangely Eccentric, yet Sane
- Strange Hallucination
- "Corner Memory Thompson"
- Mummy of a Manchester Lady
- Hypochondriasis

=== Strange Sites and Sporting Scenes ===
- "The Wonder of all the Wonders that the World ever wondered at"
- "The Princess Caraboo"
- Fat Folks.–Lambert and Bright
- A Cure for Corpulence
- Epitaphs on Fat Folks
- Count Boruwlaski, the Polish Dwarf
- The Irish Giant
- Birth Extraordinary
- William Hutton's "Strong Woman"
- Wildman and his Bees
- Lord Stowell's Love of Sight-seeing
- John Day and Fairlop Fair
- A Princely Hoax

== Volume Two ==
The contents are as follows:

=== Strange Sights and Sporting Scenes ===
- Sir John Waters's Escape
- Colonel Mackinnon's Practical Joking
- A Gourmand Physician
- Dick England, the Gambler
- Brighton Races, Thirty Years since
- Colonel Mellish
- Doncaster Eccentrics
- "Walking Stewart"
- Youthful Days of the Hon. Grantley Berkeley
- What became of the Seven Dials
- An Old Bailey Character
- Bone and Shell Exhibition
- "Quid Rides?"
- "Bolton Trotters"
- Eccentric Lord Coleraine
- Eccentric Travellers
- Elegy on a Geologist

=== Eccentric Artists ===
- Gilray and his Caricatures
- William Blake, Painter and Poet
- Nollekens, the Sculptor

=== Theatrical Folks ===
- The Young Roscius
- Hardham's "No. 37"
- Rare Criticism
- The O. P. Riot
- Origin of "Paul Pry"
- Mrs. Garrick
- Mathews, a Spanish Ambassador
- Grimaldi, the Clown
- Munden's Last Performance
- Oddities of Dowton
- Liston in Tragedy
- Boyhood of Edmund Kean
- A Mysterious Parcel
- Masquerade Incident
- Mr. T. P. Cooke in Melodrama and Pantomime
- "Romeo and Juliet" in America
- The Mulberries, a Shakspearian Club
- Colley Cibber's Daughter
- An Eccentric Love-passage
- True to the Text

=== Men of Letters ===
- Monk Lewis
- Porson's Eccentricities
- Parriana: Oddities of Dr. Parr
- Oddities of John Horne Tooke
- Mr. Canning's Humour
- Peter Pindar.–Dr. Wolcot
- The Author of "Dr. Syntax"
- Mrs. Radcliffe and the Critics
- Cool Sir James Mackintosh
- Eccentricities of Cobbett
- Heber, the Book-collector
- Sir John Soane lampooned
- Extraordinary Calculators
- Charles Lamb's Cottage at Islington
- Thomas Hood
- A Witty Archbishop
- Literary Madmen
- A Perpetual-motion Seeker
- The Romantic Duchess of Newcastle
- Sources of Laughter

=== Convivial Eccentrics ===
- Busby's Folly and Bull Feather Hall
- Old Islington Taverns
- The Oyster and Parched-pea Club
- A Manchester Punch-house
- "The Blue Key"
- Brandy in Tea
- "The Wooden Spoon"
- A Tipsy Village
- What an Epicure eats in his Life-time
- Epitaph on Dr. Maginn
- Greenwich Dinners
- Lord Pembroke's Port Wine
- A Tremendous Bowl of Punch

=== Miscellanea ===
- Long Sir Thomas Robinson
- Lord Chesterfield's Will
- An Odd Family
- An Eccentric Host
- Quackery Successful
- The Grateful Footpad
- A Notoriety of the Temple
- A Ride in a Sedan
- Mr. John Scott (Lord Eldon) in Parliament
- A Chancery Jeu-d'Esprit
- Hanging by Compact
- The Ambassador Floored
- "The Dutch Mail"
- Bad Spelling
- A "Single Conspirator"
- A Miscalculation
- An Indiscriminate Collector
- The Bishop's Saturday Night
- "Rather than otherwise"
- Classic Soup Distribution
- Alphabet Single Rhymed
- Non Sequitur and Therefore
