= English Eccentrics (opera) =

Opera by Malcolm Williamson

- Chamber opera by Malcolm Williamson
- Librettist: Geoffrey Dunn
- Language: English
- Based on: Edith Sitwell's The English Eccentrics
- Premiere: 11 June 1964; Aldeburgh Festival

English Eccentrics is a chamber opera in two acts by Malcolm Williamson to an English libretto by Geoffrey Dunn, based on Edith Sitwell's 1933 book, The English Eccentrics. It was commissioned by the English Opera Group. The opera requires the cast to make many quick changes of roles between scenes, and contrives the confrontation of several of the characters, who did not meet in real life.

== Performance history ==
The work, the second opera by the composer, was first performed in the Jubilee Hall at Aldeburgh in Suffolk, England on 11 June 1964 as part of the Aldeburgh Festival in a production by William Chappell. With the principals on stage, the 'quartet' of singers were in the pit with the orchestra, seven members of the English Chamber Orchestra, and it was broadcast on the BBC Third Programme. The original festival programme called English Eccentrics simply 'an entertainment'.

The critical reception of the premiere was mixed. Opera magazine commented that "Each of the two acts ends with a 'tragic' episode – the sad affair of Sarah Whitehead convinced that the Bank of England was defrauding her and the removal of Brummell to a mental asylum. This appears an odd forcing of the essentially comic nature of the material". The two more serious scenes were composed before the rest of the piece; Peter Pears had apparently told Williamson that what was wanted was an 'anti-opera'. A later critic wrote "There is little dramatic thread to the piece, though some poignant little plots do emerge... This score shows Williamson on a form he was later to lose – witty, affectionate and generally deftly written. ...Pastiche of styles is matched by a pastiche of structure, with many of the scenes observing the 18th-century convention of one character leaving the stage as another arrives". He also noted the magical ending, reflective, mournful and valedictory.

Revivals have tended to be by conservatoire opera groups and companies for young stage professionals, rather than established opera companies.

== Roles ==
| Role | Voice type | Premiere cast, 11 June 1964 (Conductor: Meredith Davies) |
|---|---|---|
| Lord Petersham | tenor | Raymond Nilsson |
| Thomas Parr | bass | Owen Brannigan |
| The Rev. Mr. Jones | tenor | John Fryatt |
| Miss Beswick | soprano | April Cantelo |
| Lady Lewson | mezzo-soprano | Anna Pollak |
| Mrs. Dards | soprano | April Cantelo |
| Miss Tylney Long | soprano | April Cantelo |
| The Countess of Desmond | mezzo-soprano | Anna Pollak |
| Dr. Katterfelto | baritone | Michael Maurel |
| Lord Rokeby | baritone | Michael Maurel |
| John Ward | tenor | Raymond Nilsson |
| Major Peter Labellière | bass | Owen Brannigan |
| Robert 'Romeo' Coates | tenor | John Fryatt |
| Miss FitzHenry | mezzo-soprano | Anna Pollak |
| The Prompter | bass | Owen Brannigan |
| A Governor of the Bank of England | bass | Owen Brannigan |
| Young Whitehead | tenor | Raymond Nilsson |
| Sarah Whitehead (his sister) | soprano | April Cantelo |
| Alderman Birch | baritone | Michael Maurel |
| Mrs. Birch | mezzo-soprano | Anna Pollak |
| Roberts the Forger | bass | Owen Brannigan |
| Bank clerk | tenor | John Fryatt |
| Lord Rothschild | baritone | Michael Maurel |
| Dr. Dalmahoy | bass | Owen Brannigan |
| Lady Jersey | mezzo-soprano | Anna Pollak |
| Dr. Graham | tenor | John Fryatt |
| The Duchess of Devonshire | soprano | April Cantelo |
| Beau Brummell | tenor | Raymond Nilsson |
| Captain Philip Thicknesse | bass | Owen Brannigan |
| Mr. Worrall | baritone | Michael Maurel |
| Mrs. Worrall | mezzo-soprano | Anna Pollak |
| The Vicar of Almondsbury | tenor | John Fryatt |
| Princess Caraboo | soprano | April Cantelo |
| Mr. Clanronald Macdonald | tenor | John Fryatt |
| Parish Constable | bass | Owen Brannigan |
| Dr. Wilkinson | tenor | Raymond Nilsson |
| First Nun | soprano | April Cantelo |
| Second Nun | mezzo-soprano | Anna Pollak |
| Etienne | baritone | Michael Maurel |
Quartet: Barbara Elsy, Pauline Stevens, Ian Partridge, Christopher Keyte (two sopranos, tenor, bass)

== Synopsis ==
=== Act 1 ===
Prelude – Goose-weather

Scene 1: An introduction to Eccentricity – features encounters with a variety of eccentrics: Lord Petersham, Miss Tylney Long (collectors of snuff boxes and hats), the ancient Thomas Parr and Countess of Desmond, the Reverend Jones, Dr Katterfelto and Miss Beswick, Lord Rokeby and Lady Lewson with their opposing views on baths, John Ward, Mrs Dards and Major Labelliere.

Scene 2: An Amateur of Fashion – a scene from Shakespeare's Romeo and Juliet.

Scene 3: The God of this World – Young Whitehead spends all his money on his sister Sarah, resigns from the bank and turns to crime and is hanged; her inability to comprehend the situation makes her go mad.

=== Act 2 ===
Scene 1: Quacks and a Beau – Drs Katterfelto, Dalmahoy and Graham offer cures for every ill; and an introduction to Brummell, arbiter of fashion, and his entourage.

Scene 2: An Ornamental Hermit – Captain Thicknesse's attempt to write his memoirs fails.

Scene 3: A Traveller – the story of the imposter Mary Baker.

Scene 4: The Beau again – the senile decline of Brummell and death in a Caen boarding-house.
