= William Pope (priest) =

English Catholic priest (1825–1905)

The Reverend Canon William Pope
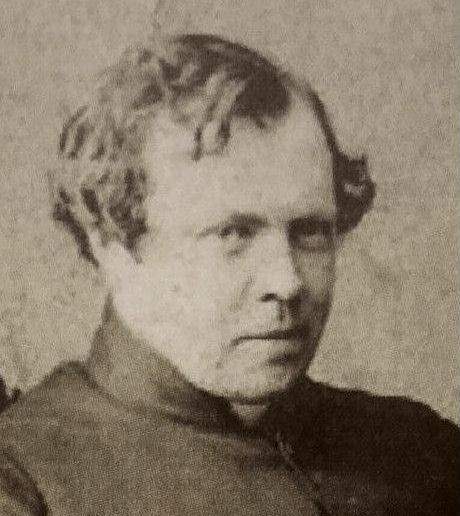
- Pope, in the 1850s
- Born: 16 March 1825; Whitby, North Riding of Yorkshire
- Died: 5 November 1905 (aged 80); Presbytery of St Robert's Church, Harrogate, West Riding of Yorkshire
- Burial place: Grove Road Cemetery, Harrogate
- Education: Christ's College, Cambridge
- Years active: 1848–1905
- Relatives: Richard Whately; Elizabeth Whately; Henry Bishop; Baden Powell
- Church: Catholic Church (formerly Church of England])
- Ordained: 1848 as Anglican deacon; 1857 as Catholic priest
- Offices held: Anglican priest; Catholic priest; canon of Leeds Cathedral

William Pope (16 March 1825 – 5 November 1905) was an English Catholic clergyman. As a young man he seceded from Anglicanism to a priesthood in the Catholic Church as a follower of John Henry Newman, the Oxford Movement and Tractarianism.

After serving in two churches following his initial Anglican ordination, Pope became troubled in his theological conscience, and went home to his father in York. Although he preached with success in that town, he remained severely disquieted about Anglicanism for about a year, until he suddenly made a decision to convert and was received into the Catholic Church. After studying for four years in Rome, he was ordained as a Catholic priest there, performing his first mass in the crypt of St. Peter's Basilica. He then served as a chaplain in Ilkley for twenty-two years, and as a rector in Harrogate for sixteen years. In both appointments, he worked with dedication, organising the building of a church in Ilkley, erecting schools in both towns, and serving the community and church in other ways.

When he died at the age of 80, he was remembered across the United Kingdom and Ireland as one of the last surviving Anglican clerical followers of Newman who converted to Roman Catholic priesthood. He was given an "impressive" funeral in Harrogate, and his hearse was followed by over fifty chanting priests and many townspeople.

== Background ==
Pope came from a family with Anglican clerical connections. His great-grandfather was William Pope the elder, (Note: William Pope the elder (died Hillingdon 1789).) owner of Hillingdon rectory estate; he married Mabel Mills, (Note: Mabel Pope née Mills (c.1735–1823).) daughter of Richard Mills, vicar of Hillingdon. Pope's paternal grandfather was barrister William Pope the younger, (Note: William Pope the younger (died 1809), barrister.) who worked in the Exchequer Office, Temple. On 15 May 1790 he married Mary Heaton Pope, (Note: Mary Heaton Pope (baptised 22 December 1795).) daughter of Sherlock Willis, vicar of Wormley, Hertfordshire.

Pope's father was the Evangelical preacher Reverend Frederick Sherlock W. Pope, (Note: Frederick Sherlock W. Pope (Middlesex 1793 – York 5 February 1852). Baptised 31 December 1793. GRO index: Deaths Mar 1852 Pope Frederick York 9d 20. His death certificate says: "Fifth February 1852, Parish of Saint Mary Bishophill Junior, York. Frederick Sherlock Pope, clerk. Cause of death: disease of the heart. Informant John Wood coroner, York". His memorial stone says: "This tablet is erected to the memory of the Rev. Frederick Sherlock Pope, curate of the Parish of Holy Trinity, to record the high esteem borne toward him, among whom he laboured for 4 years, with unwearied zeal, and disinterested benevolence. He died suddenly in York, Feb. 3rd 1852, aged 58 years". F.S.W. Pope is buried in Holy Trinity Priory Churchyard, York.) vicar of the Baxtergate Chapel of Ease, which later became St Ninian's Parish Church; it was located on Baxtergate, in Whitby. His mother was Eliza Jane Pope née Skinner. (Note: Eliza Jane Pope née Skinner (born Whitby c. 1798).) His parents married on 19 February 1824 in Stockton Parish, Durham. One of Pope's uncles was Richard Whately, Protestant Archbishop of Dublin, who married Pope's aunt, Elizabeth Pope, the sister of Rev. Frederick Sherlock W. Pope. Another uncle was Rev. Henry Bishop who married F.S.W. Pope's sister Louisa, and a third uncle was the mathematician Baden Powell, who married another of F.S.W. Pope's sisters, Charlotte. A fourth uncle was Reverend William Law Pope, brother of F.S.W. Pope.

Pope was born in Whitby on 16 March 1825. (Note: William Pope (1835–1905). GRO index: Deaths Dec 1905 Pope William 80 Knaresbro' 9a 76. Burial plot: Grove Road Cemetery, Harrogate, section K, number 12.) He was baptised on 11 April 1825 at Whitby. He was the eldest of at least eight siblings, the younger ones being: Sarah Margaret, (Note: Sarah Margaret Pope (born 1830, baptised 15 January 1830).) Frederick Sherlock Willis, (Note: Frederick Sherlock Willis Pope (born 1831), baptised on 13 October 1831.) Louisa, (Note: Louisa Pope (born 1834).) Elizabeth S., (Note: Elizabeth S. Pope (born 1836).) John S., (Note: John S. Pope (born 1837) He was possibly Father Xavier de Vacht, who attended Pope's funeral and retired in 1907, .) Mary Skinner, (Note: Mary Skinner Pope (1838 – Filey 3 May 1897). Baptised 10 August 1838. GRO index: Deaths Jun 1897 Pope Mary Skinner 58 Scarbro' 9d 220. The 1861–1881 censuses find her as an unmarried lodger in York or Whitby, living on her own means (fundholder).) and Charlotte S. (Note: Charlotte Pope (born 1840).) John S. Pope was a Jesuit priest. The 1841 census finds the family at Bagdale, Whitby, with Frederick describing himself as a clergyman. William Pope was not present in any of the census pages which included his father.

Pope attended St Peter's School, York, and was also educated by a private tutor. He was sent by his father to Christ's College, Cambridge. "[Pope] was entered for Oxford, but on account of the materialistic influence then prevailing at the university, and its probable effect on the young man, his father took him off the books, and he was sent to ... Cambridge". He received his Cambridge degree in 1848.

=== Misprinted marriage announcement ===
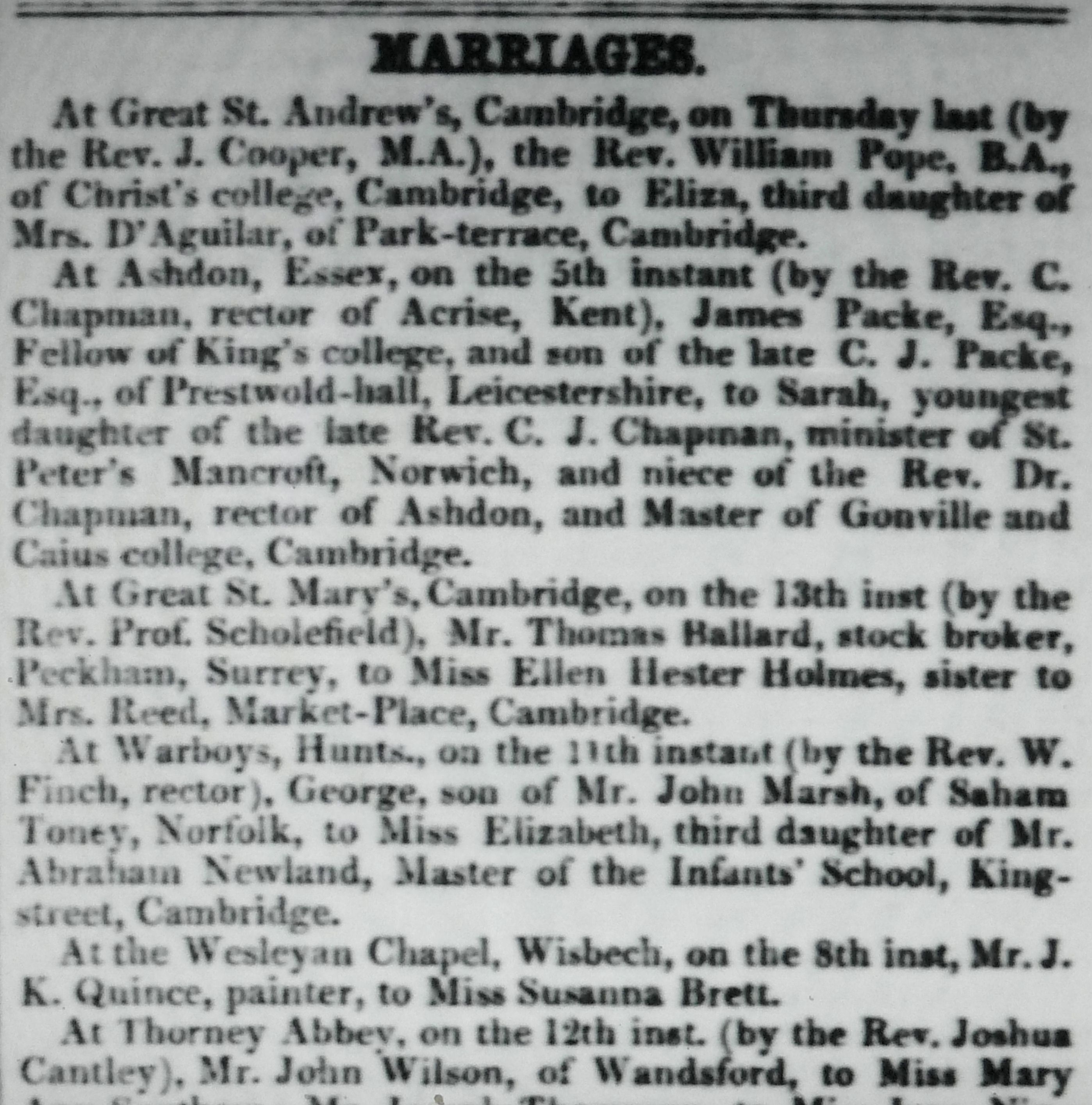
1848 marriage announcement

According to the Cambridge Independent Press and the newspapers which repeated the announcement, on 12 October 1848 at Great St Andrew's Church, Cambridge, one Revd. William Pope, B.A., of Christ's College, Cambridge, married Eliza D'Aguilar of Cambridge. However, in the 1851 census Pope is described as unmarried, and Eliza is not present. It is Rev. John Pawley Pope who is listed as the bridegroom on the 1848 marriage certificate of Eliza D'Aguilar. (Note: Re newspaper announcement of the marriage of William Pope and Eliza D'Aguilar. The GRO index for the same marriage gives a different name for the groom: Marriages Dec 1848 Pope John Pawley and D'Aguilar Eliza, Cambridge XIV 3. The original marriage certificate says, "St Andrew's the Great. Cambridge. October 12th 1848. John Pawley Pope (clerk) of Langley, Essex, son of merchant John Pope, and Eliza D'Aguilar. of Cambridge, daughter of Colonel George Thomas D'Aguilar. Both of full age, bachelor and spinster. Officiating minister was Thomas A. Pope". William Pope is not mentioned on the marriage certificate. J.P. Pope received his B.A. degree at Christ's College, Cambridge on 3 June 1846. He was assistant chaplain to the Madras Presidency, and died aged 33 years on 1 June 1857 on board the Royal Mail steamer Juno.)

=== Personality ===
In his 1905 funeral oration about Pope, Dr Bray described him as being "semi-guileless", with "transparent sincerity". He had "dignity", "gravity", "reserve", and "held respect". He had "the refinement of the cultured scholar, and the earnestness of the devoted priest. He won friends wherever he went. Though a scholar of brilliant attainments, and able to hold his own in any society. he yet prepared to live a retired life ... unknown to the world".

== Career ==
=== Anglicanism ===
In 1848 Pope was ordained as an Anglican deacon, and accepted the curacy of Bolton le Moors, Lancashire. On 18 September of the same year he officiated in Stillorgan Church in Ireland, at the marriage of his cousin Henrietta, daughter of Richard Whately, the Archbishop of Dublin, to Charles Brent Wale, son of General Sir Charles Wale, K.C.B.

=== Conversion to the Catholic Church ===
Pope was "one of Cardinal Newman's converts", and a "follower of the Tractarian Movement". Newman inspired multiple secessions of men of the cloth in the United Kingdom: in 1851 thirty-eight Anglican clergymen converted to the Roman Church, in 1852 it was seven, and in 1853 Pope was one of three. (Note: The numbers of secessions from Anglicanism given here do not include conversions of laymen in the United Kingdom, or conversions of clergy and laymen outside the UK.) The Halifax Evening Courier described Pope as: "a disciple of Newman and survivor of that band of men who were led by Newman's influence into communion with the Church of Rome". The Wharfedale & Airedale Observer stated that:

Canon Pope was always a great admirer of Cardinal Newman, in whose writings he was thoroughly well versed. He frequently recalled an interesting incident illustrating the influence of Dr Newman. When going up to Cambridge for his first term, some young men got into the train, and one of them remarked, Newman has become a Catholic, whereupon another immediately replied, Then so shall I.

Following his curacy at Bolton le Moors, Pope took up a curacy at the tiny, 13th-century St Edward's Church in Teffont Magna, Wiltshire, which was a chapel of ease for Dinton. The 1851 census finds him unmarried, living alone with a servant in Teffont Magna, and describing himself as curate of Dinton. However, being "very unsettled" there, he left that position and returned to his father's home in York in 1852. His father was a member of the Protestant Alliance, at whose meetings strong comments were made against the Church of Rome. F.S.W. Pope attended one of its meetings on 30 January 1852. He had a suspected heart condition and, according to the coroner at his inquest, died suddenly of "a visitation of God" a few days later on 5 February.

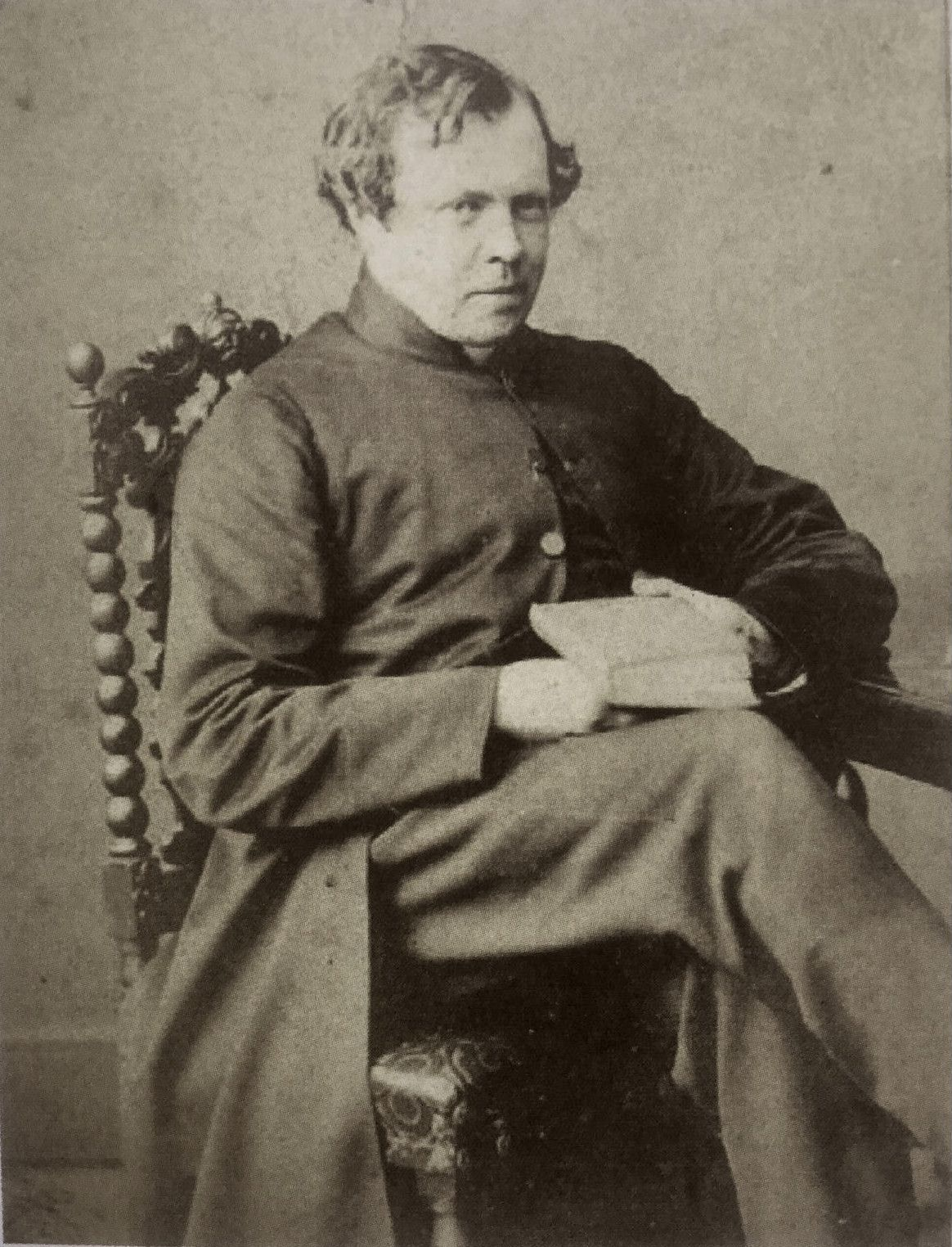
Pope, after his conversion

In York, Pope preached at All Saints' Church, Pavement, and was accepted as a "very popular preacher"; however, he refused an offer by the Anglican diocese of a living in the city. He then experienced "a period of some doubt and anxiety" on religious questions. This was "the crisis of his life", and he was called to "arise and leave his father's house and kindred, and go into a strange country". He suffered doubts about the position of the Anglican Church and about his own theological position. In this "time of bitter suffering", he retired from his Anglican priesthood, and gave himself up to prayer and study, finding it very difficult to give up his old life and to begin a new one. Dr Bray said, "That was his prospect for eighteen terrible months, during which he sought to know his Master's will. At last he knew it. At last the call came strong and clear, and, forthwith, leaving all, he rose up and followed it".

In September 1853, Pope was received into the Church of Rome by Rev. Father Tracey Clark, S.J. For four years he studied theology in Rome, and was ordained in September 1857 at St John Lateran. He performed his initial mass in St Peter's crypt. He returned to England in 1857, having spent five years in Italy.

=== Mission work ===
On his arrival in England in 1857 Pope took up mission work. In that year he was made priest of the Roman Catholic chapel in Egton Bridge. According to The Tablet, "He was first appointed to Yarm, in the then Diocese of Beverley". According to the 1861 census, Pope was living and working in High Worsall near Yarm in that year, living alone with two servants, describing himself as a Catholic priest. At that time the village had an 18th-century chapel dedicated to St John. After Yarm, he worked for a year in Hunslet, Leeds.

=== Chaplaincy in Ilkley ===
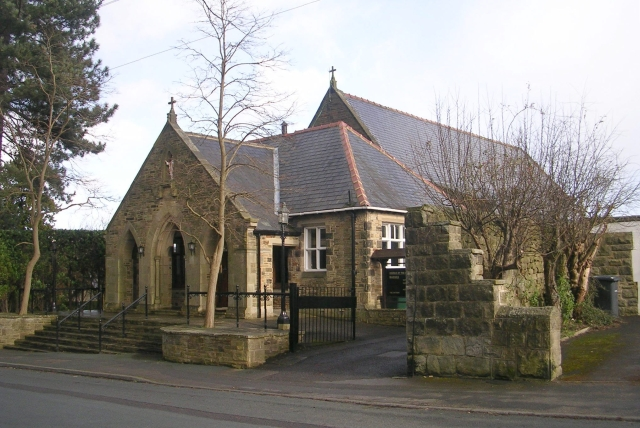
Church of the Sacred Heart, Ilkley

Pope was chaplain to the Middleton family at Middleton Lodge, Ilkley, from around 1867, (Note: Contemporary sources spell the family name and place name variously as "Middelton" and "Middleton".) and he remained there for twenty-two years, until 1889. Because there was no Roman Catholic church in Ilkley when he arrived, "he practically started the mission in Ilkley". Its congregation had been worshipping at a chapel at Middleton (now known as Middleton-on-Wharfe) since 1825. Therefore, besides being a private chaplain, Pope also acted as a parish priest to the local Catholic congregation in Nesfield, Addingham, Ilkley and Middleton. The building of the Church of the Sacred Heart, founded in 1878 on Stockeld Road in Ilkley, owed much to his leadership and organisation of its building committee. Pope also worked to build St Mary's School for Catholic pupils alongside the church, and he served on the Ilkley School Board between 1878 and 1889. Pope persuaded William Middleton to donate the land on Stockeld Road, and £1,300 (equivalent to £136,665.4 in 2025) was raised for the building. In 1881 he was living in the Priest's House with one servant, in Middleton in Wharfedale, describing himself as a Roman Catholic priest. When he left Ilkley, he was presented with an illuminated address and a purse of gold.

=== St Robert's Church, Harrogate ===
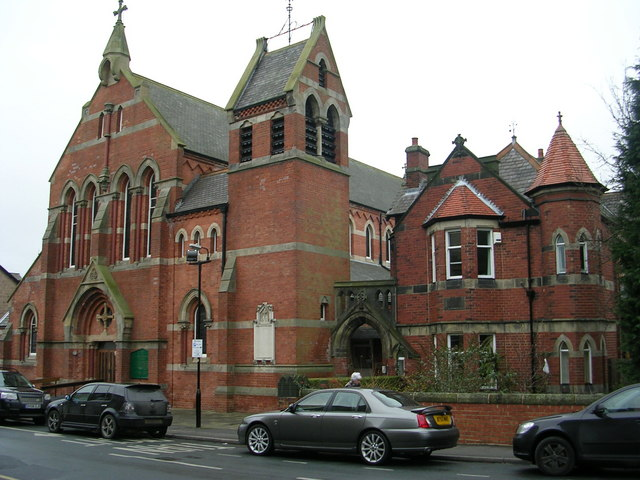
St Robert's Church, Harrogate

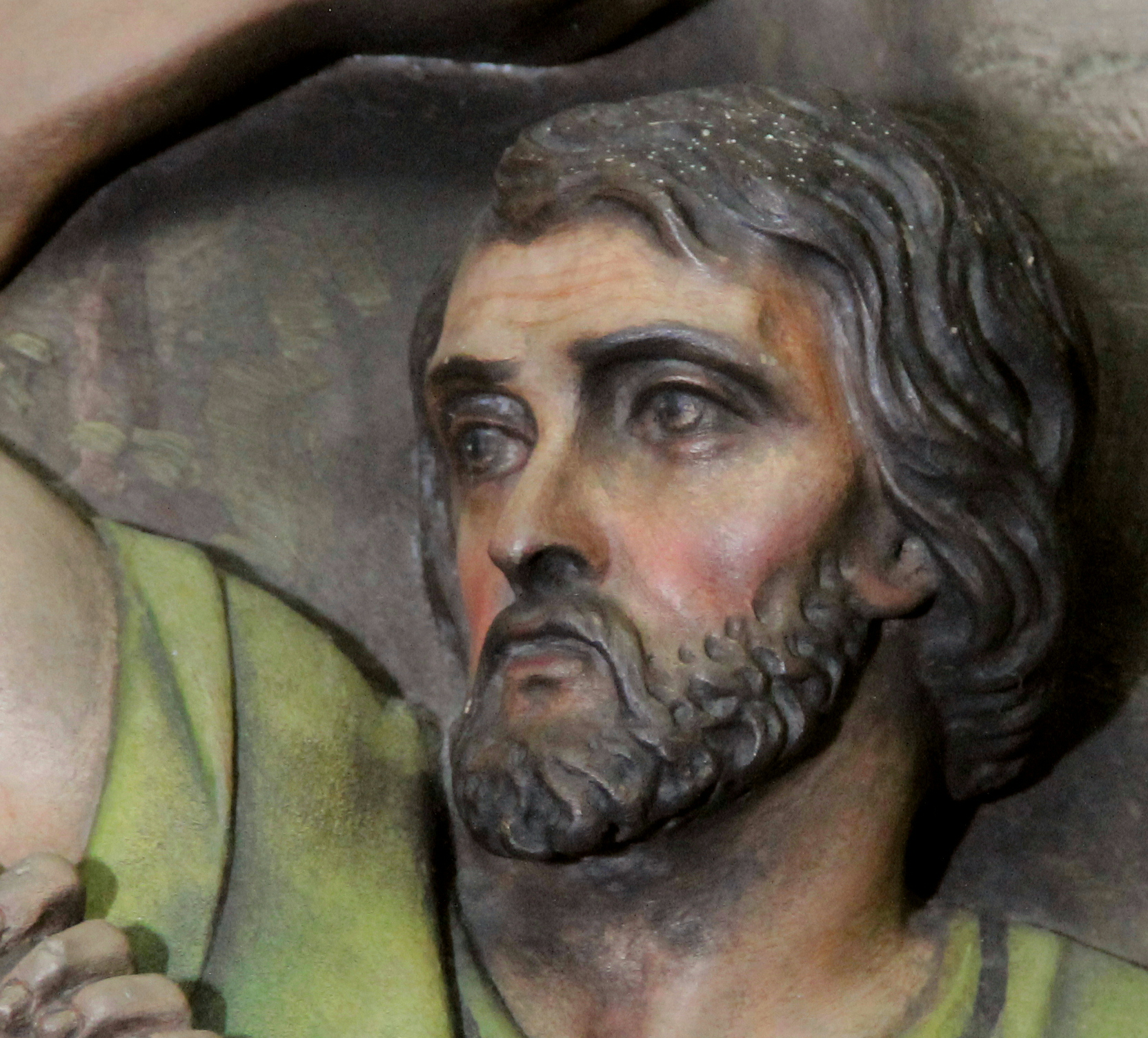
Stations of the Cross (detail) in St Robert's

The Tablet said that Pope had "lived and laboured" in Harrogate, and "wore himself out ... He loved his church, and he strove to make it more worthy as a dwelling place for the Divine guest; [the congregation] had only to look round and see the beauty and order of the beautiful church". For 16 years from 1889 until his death in 1905, Pope served in ministerial duties at St Robert's Church, Harrogate, at the same time serving as a canon of Leeds Cathedral. He was instrumental in organising the building of the schools attached to the church, in Robert Street, founded in 1895, and in arranging the installation of the Italianate bas relief panels of the Stations of the Cross in the church's nave. Pope did not take part in public life in Harrogate, but dedicated himself to pastoral work with his congregation. The last census of his lifetime finds him at the presbytery of St Robert's, living alongside a lodger Philip Bethell who was a Roman Catholic priest born in France, and three domestic servants.

When money was bequeathed by a donor for stained-glass windows in the church, Pope organised the design and execution of two windows: the Virgin Mary and St Robert window on the right of the main altar, and the St Michael and St Theresa window on the left of the altar. They were designed by architects Goldie & Child, and executed by Edward Reginald Frampton or his father Edward Frampton. He had the sanctuary decorated with murals by Goldie and Child, in 1893, and he arranged for a new organ by William Hill & Son to be installed in 1899. Towards the end of Pope's life, his curate was Rev. William Joseph Bickerdike, (Note: William Joseph Bickerdike (Tadcaster 1878 – Claro 3 February 1955). GRO index; Births Mar 1878 Bickerdike William Joseph Tadcaster 9c 810. Deaths Mar 1955 Bickerdike William J. 76 Claro 2c 126.) who was subsequently priest of St Joseph's Church, Bilton, for 26 years. The church building, along with the Stations of the Cross in the nave, was consecrated long after Pope's death, on 10 May 1930, by Bishop Joseph Cowgill of Leeds. (Note: The painted wood and plaster panels of the Stations of the Cross at St Robert's Church were possibly imported from Munich and installed in the 1890s at the behest of Pope.)

== Death ==
Pope remained active until a few months before his death. In May 1905, he gave a guinea (equivalent to £110.38 in 2025) to Yorkshire's Pickering Mission, for the adaptation of cottages and a barn for church use. He also travelled to an event involving one of his sisters, Rev. Mother Mary Frances Pope, Mother Superior of St Mary's Convent, York. (Note: Rev. Mother Mary Frances Pope. It has not been possible to identify her birth name, because nuns are often given saints' names, and Pope did not have a sister with the birth name Frances, although several newspapers identified this notable Mother Superior as Pope's sister. A Latin address sent to her from the Vatican on her jubilee names her as Religiosse Moniali Mariae Franciscae Pope (Religious Nun Mary Frances Pope).) In July 1905, Pope attended the week-long celebration of her golden jubilee, which began with the ceremony of crowning. The event took place at the Bar Convent in York. He attended alongside Dr William Giles, titular bishop of Philadelphia in Lydia, (Note: William Giles (1830–1913), Bishop 1904–1913.) the rector of the English College, Rome, and the bishop of Leeds, besides local clergy from Leeds and Middlesbrough. At the ceremony, Pope presented a portrait of his sister to the convent.

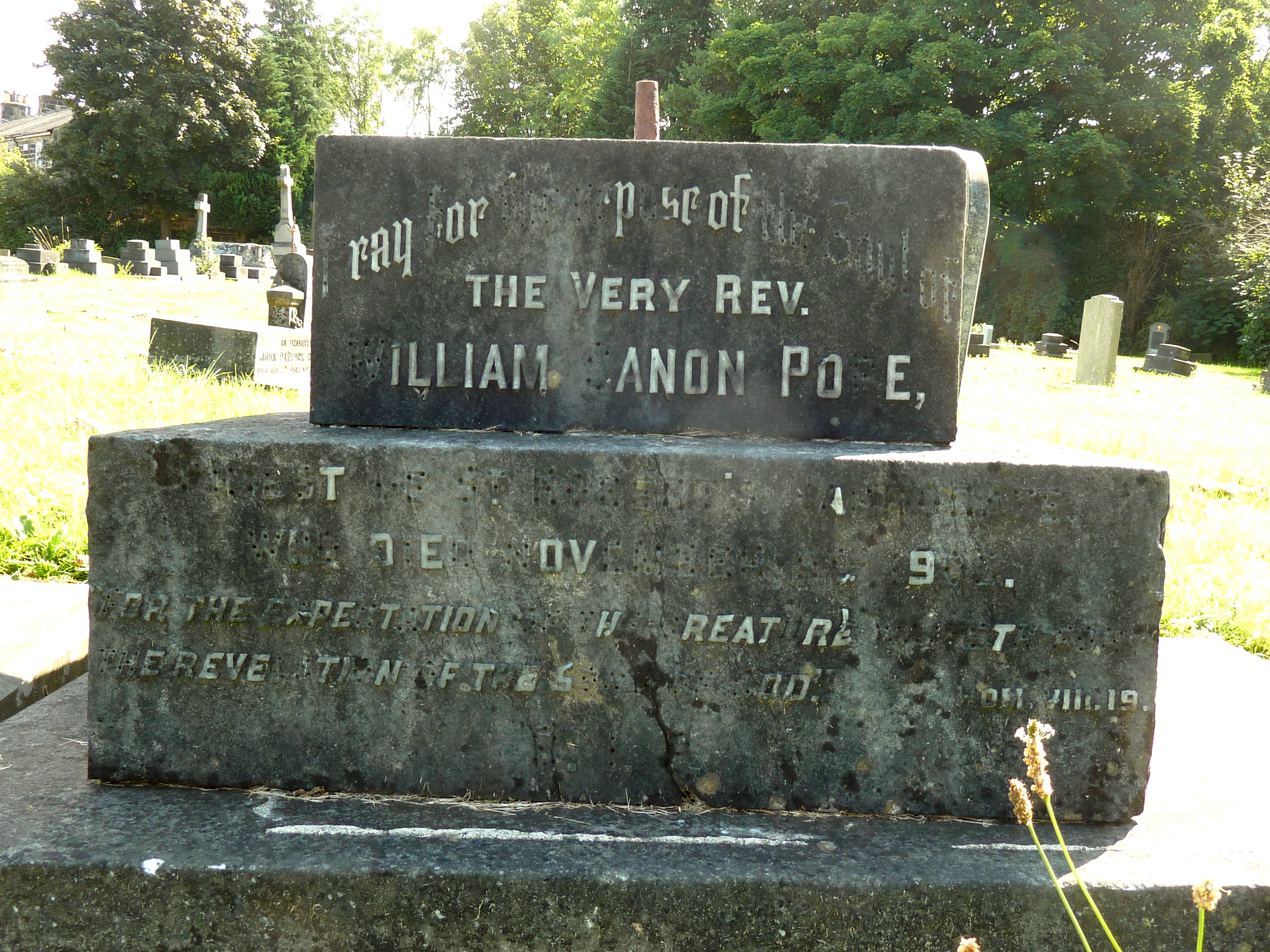
Pope's gravestone

Pope enjoyed "robust health" for most of his life, but a few months before his death, he began to lose his "robust constitution" and became weaker, and less active in the church. By October 1905, Pope was reported by the Yorkshire Evening Press to be seriously ill, at home. Pope died "peacefully" on 5 November 1905, at the presbytery of St Robert's Church, Harrogate, having served as a Roman Catholic priest for 48 years. At the time of his death, his brother John was a Jesuit priest.

The "impressive" funeral service took place on 18 November 1905. It was attended by "large numbers of priests from various parts of the country", and the church was full with mourners. Every seat was taken, and there were people outside who were unable to get in. The chief mourner was William Gordon, Roman Catholic Bishop of Leeds, who was accompanied by more than fifty priests. In the sermon by Dr Bray of St Joseph's Seminary, Leeds, it was made clear that Pope was remembered as a "loved friend ... a faithful shepherd and a true and devoted priest ... a true Christian gentleman". After the funeral sermon, fifty chanting priests preceded the coffin bearers to the hearse. The funeral cortège then made its way from St Robert's Church to Grove Road Cemetery for the graveside service, which took place "in the presence of an exceptionally large gathering of Catholic clergy, members of the Catholic Church, and townspeople". There was sung music at the cemetery and graveside. Rev. Father Bickerdike conducted the graveside service.

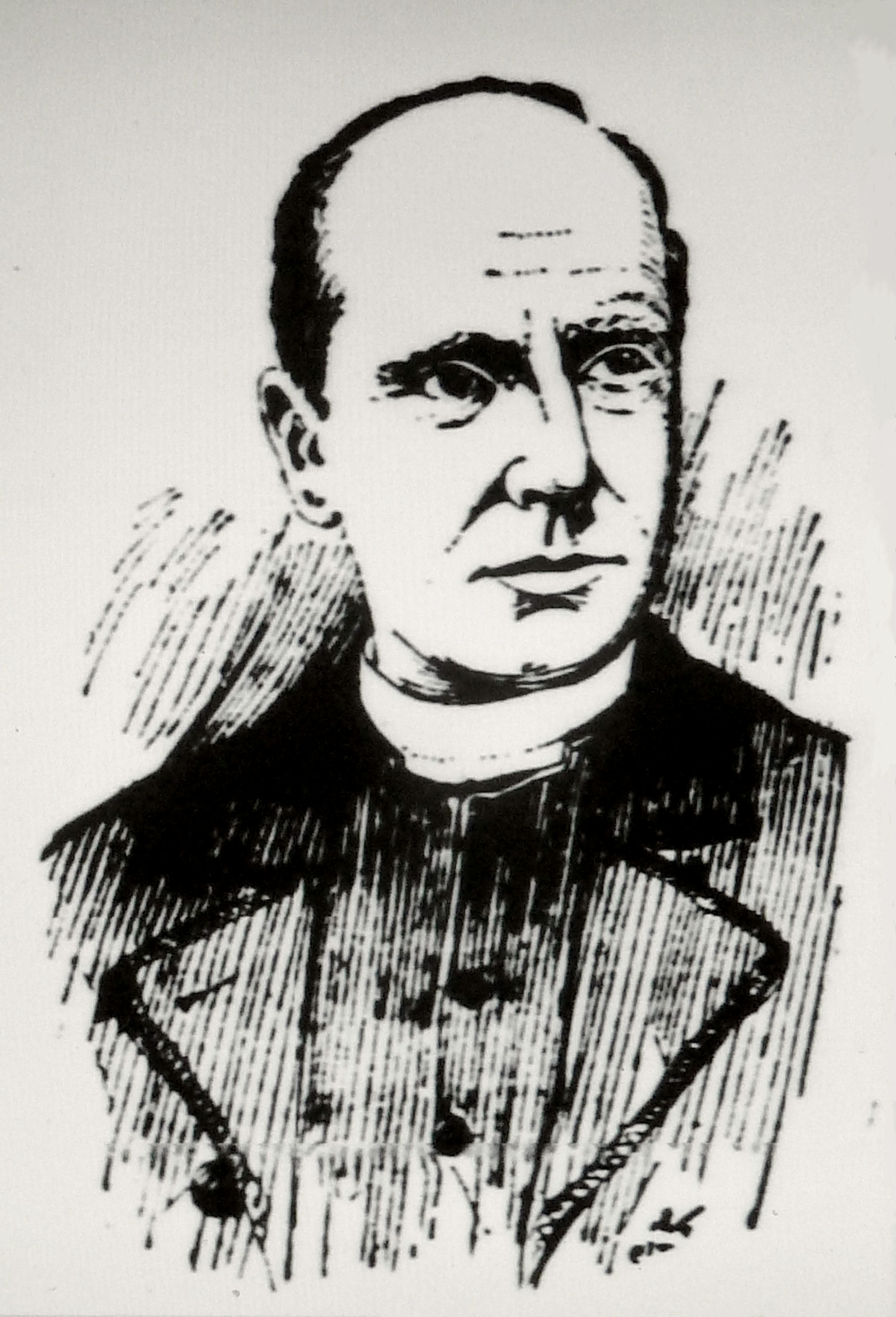
Father Austin J. Saxton

Charles Newsham's unaccompanied four-part mass, a "solemn high mass of requiem", (Note: Father Charles Newsham (1791–1863), president of Ushaw College, Durham. GRO index: Deaths Mar 1863 Newsham Charles Durham 10a 153. See Ebin: Roman Catholic Church Music in England, 1791-1914.) was sung for Pope on 2 December 1905 at St Robert's. Father A. J. Saxton, Pope's successor, was the celebrant, and Father Bickerdike was subdeacon at the mass. This was the same four-part mass by Newsham that was sung at Pope's funeral.

Pope's death was noted in the United Kingdom and in Ireland, as the passing of one of the last surviving converts of Newman. He was remembered across England, for example in Whitby, Staffordshire, Newcastle, Sheffield, Manchester, West of England, Northampton, and Formby. He was remembered in Edinburgh, and also in Jersey where his name was misspelt as Revd Canon Pope Stroberts. Various newspapers in Ireland noted his passing. The Protestant Belfast News Letter noted his death in the accustomed polite manner, but used the headline, "A Newman Pervert". (Note: "Pervert" in the context of clerical secessions from Anglicanism was a synonym of "apostate", and its pejorative usage was a symptom of contemporary bitter controversy. However, in that context the word did not reference sexual behaviour.) Pope was memorialised in The Irish Weekly and Ulster Examiner, The Dundalk Examiner and Louth Advertiser, The Derry Journal, The Drogheda Argus and Leinster Journal, The Irish Independent, and The Irish Times.

=== Successor ===
Pope's successor from November 1905 at St Robert's was Augustine Joseph Saxton, known as Rev. Austin J. Saxton, (Note: Austin J. Saxton (Leeds 1862 – Hull 1949). GRO index: Births Sep 1862 Saxton Augustine Joseph Leeds 9b 360. Deaths Dec 1949 Saxton Austin 55 Hull 2a 292.) who had previously served at Our Lady and All Saints Church in Otley for fifteen years.
