= Mary Whately =

Mary Whately may refer to:

- Mary Whateley (1738–1825), English poet and playwright
- Mary Louisa Whately (1824–1889), English missionary in Egypt
