= Elizabeth Whately =

English writer and wife of Dr Richard Whately

Elizabeth Whately (née Pope; 7 October 1795 – 25 April 1860) was an English writer and the wife of Dr Richard Whately, Protestant Archbishop of Dublin. She wrote and edited a number of fictional, religious and educational works, although little of her writing appeared explicitly under her own name.

== Background ==
Whately was born in 1795, the daughter of William Pope of Hillingdon, Middlesex, and his wife, Mary (née Heaton) Pope. She was baptised at St John the Baptist in Hillingdon on 22 December 1795. (Note: Her daughter Jane Whately's memoir of her sister Mary Louisa Whately gives Elizabeth's father as J. C. Pope of Hillingdon, although this seems likely to be a mistake; or, he was referred to as J. C. to distinguish him from William Pope the elder.)

The Pope family acquired the Hillingdon rectory estate during the 18th century, from the Harington family. William Pope, the elder, married in 1773 the daughter of Richard Mills, vicar of Hillingdon, resided at the parsonage, and was buried in the churchyard in 1789. With others he had briefly owned Whitton Park in the 1760s. His widow Mabel died in 1823, at age 88.

William Pope, the younger, of Gray's Inn, was admitted on 19 April 1787 as the eldest son of William Pope of Hillingdon; he worked in the Exchequer office. He married Mary Heaton, only daughter of the Rev. Sherlock Willis, rector of Wormley, in 1790, and died in 1809. They had daughters and a son; one of the daughters died in 1829, in Tunbridge Wells. Elizabeth was the third daughter; the youngest daughter Louisa married Henry Bishop in 1833. Charlotte Pope, Elizabeth's sister, married Baden Powell in 1837 as his second wife.

Elizabeth's brother was William Law Pope, who matriculated at Worcester College, Oxford in 1814, at age 17. Beidler infers that Elizabeth Pope may have worked as a governess, a parallel possibly existing with the plot of The Roving Bee (1855) attributed to her. In any case Charlotte Brontë praised her empathy with the plight of the governess in an unrelated family, expressed in Pope's 1847 work English Life. Thomas Mozley states that Elizabeth's brother was an old friend of John Frederick Christie, fellow of Oriel College, Oxford, and accompanied Richard Whately to Dublin.

A further Oxford connection was the Rev. James Pope, Elizabeth's uncle, a Fellow of St John's College and evangelical, who became vicar of Great Staughton.

== Marriage ==
Elizabeth Pope had a first cousin, Sherlock Willis, son of the Rev John Law Willis and thus grandson of the Rev Sherlock Willis, her maternal grandfather. Sherlock Willis was an Oxford friend of Richard Whately, whom she met in 1820, and married in 1821 in Cheltenham; she was living there with her widowed mother, when Whately came with Willis to take the waters.

The Whatelys moved to Halesworth, a living taken by Richard who was required to give up his college fellowship at Oriel on marrying. Elizabeth found the parishioners there to be in a state of "heathenish ignorance". They had five children; Elizabeth herself and her two elder daughters, Jane Whately and Mary Louisa Whately, were in time active in religiously inspired works. Elizabeth was ill in Halesworth, and a sister came to visit, becoming ill also; the malady was called "typhus fever".

They returned to Oxford after three years, when Richard became head of St Alban's Hall, Oxford in 1825. Elizabeth Whately knew the leaders of what would be the Tractarian group socially, riding with John Henry Newman on 7 October 1831, according to his diary. John Keble had visited the Whately's at Halesworth, reading to them from the Christian Year in manuscript; and the Whatelys called on the newly married Edward Pusey and his wife on 18 September 1828. Elizabeth had some criticism of a sermon of Edward Hawkins, Provost of Oriel College, causing Richard to write an apology on 2 March 1831, if not quite seriously.

== In Dublin ==
In the early 1830s, Richard Whately was made Anglican Archbishop of Dublin, and the family moved to Ireland. But the marriage was under strain. Joseph Blanco White formed part of the household, as tutor to Edward Whately. The archbishop came to view his theology as a bad influence on his wife, who was experiencing a crisis of her Christian faith. Matters came to a head at the end of 1834, over a translation Blanco White, who was in transition to a Unitarian position, was making from August Neander. Elizabeth had a confiding relationship with Blanco White, as did her sister Charlotte who was aware of the strife, and they kept in touch by letter when he had left Dublin.

At the end of her life, from December 1834, Felicia Hemans spent time at Redesdale, the Whately's place in Kilmacud, and corresponded with Elizabeth. The Whatelys were in Rugby visiting Thomas Arnold in autumn 1835, and Elizabeth made an impression on the young William Charles Lake. Tom Arnold, son of the family, wrote of her:

Her features were far from regular, but in her best days the eyes beamed with kindness and intelligence, and wonderfully lit up the rest of the face. In the whole Whately circle there was no one, I think — and we loved them all — to whom the hearts of the whole Arnold circle went out with so warm and special a love as to the mother. She was drawn in her later years into the proselytising operations which awakened the zeal of her daughters, and a great family sorrow came to throw a shade of gloom upon her once radiant forehead; but the intrinsic benevolence of her nature never changed.

== Later life ==
In 1841 Elizabeth suffered a compound fracture of her leg. She challenged George Combe on his 1847 pamphlet Remarks on National Education. Another disagreement with her husband with a theological root was Elizabeth's support in the 1840s for Alexander Dallas, whose efforts with Irish Church Missions were dismissed by the archbishop. Elizabeth and her daughters supported the work of Ellen Smyly, an associate of Dallas, but without the backing of her husband. When Daniel Murray was succeeded by Paul Cullen as Roman Catholic Archbishop of Dublin, the family connection with Dallas caused Cullen to conclude that Richard Whately was concerned with proselytising.

During the early years of the Great Famine, Richard and Elizabeth Whately set up a relief committee, and contributed to it. Elizabeth was involved in industrial school, ragged school and Sunday school works as President of a society based in Townsend Street, Dublin.

Elizabeth Whately visited Blanco White once in Liverpool, with her daughters Jane and Mary. John Hamilton Thom, Blanco White's biographer, dealt in The Theological Review for 1867 with the estrangement from the Whatelys at length, in reply to Jane Whately's biography of her father.

== Death and legacy ==
Elizabeth Whately died on 25 April 1860, in Hastings. Alexander Dallas preached her funeral sermon. Her obituary in the Belfast Mercury credited her with the foundation of Dublin by Lamplight, a Magdalene asylum in Ballsbridge from 1855. The Clergy Daughters' School building in Leeson Park, Dublin was erected in her memory.

== Works ==
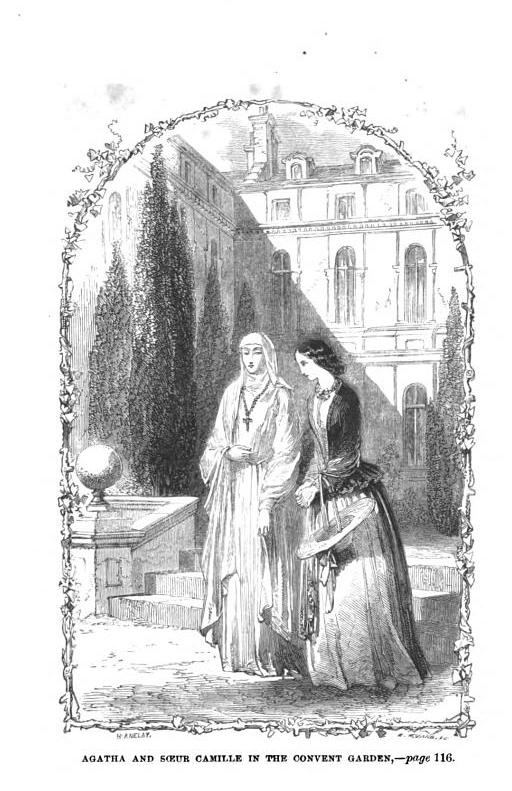
"Agatha and Soeur Camille in the Convent Garden", from Quicksands on Foreign Shores (1854) by Elizabeth Whately

- Children's tracts. Titles mentioned on the title page of Reverses (1833) are Conversations on the Life of Christ and First Preaching of the Gospel by the Apostles. Fitzpatrick states that the titles by Elizabeth Whately that appeared in 1830 were edited by Richard Whately.
- Village Conversations in Hard Times (1831, two parts) by "a Country Pastor". In the past attributed to Richard Whately.
- Reverses: or Memoirs of the Fairfax Family (1833), novel. The conclusion of the story has the Fairfax family emigrating to Canada. Richard Whately wrote about such emigrants in one of his early contributions to the Quarterly Review. Mary Charlotte Mair Simpson, daughter of Nassau William Senior, attributes the tale "Norval" in this work to Richard Whately.
- The Second Part of the History of Rasselas, Prince of Abyssinia (1835, R. Fellowes), a continuation of Rasselas, intended as children's literature. It was first published in 1834 in a collection edited by Lady Mary Fox. This work was neglected until a 1950 article by Robert Metzdorf. According to Richard, Whately "draws characters confident that Christian order will eventually spread over the globe." The same collection contained Atmos the Giant by Blanco White, inspired by his 1832 journey on the Liverpool and Manchester Railway, and passed to Elizabeth Whately.

A Guide to Irish Fiction comments on the gap to 1854 in Elizabeth Whately's production of fiction after this work. She edited Thoughts of a Parent on Education, by the Late Mrs Richard Trench (1837) by the late Melesina Trench. Egerton Ryerson gained the impression from Richard Whately, around 1845, that the Irish Education Board's standard texts for religious instruction were written by him and his wife; but that was incorrect. The 1845 edition of Tales of the Genii by James Ridley, appearing under Richard Whately's name, is attributed to Elizabeth. The Light and the Life (1850) is also attributed to Elizabeth.

- English Life, social and domestic, in the middle of the nineteenth century, considered in reference to our position as a community of professing Christians (1847, B. Fellowes)
- Lectures on Scripture Parables (1854), "with the Correction and Supervision of Dr. Whately"
- Quicksands on Foreign Shores (1854), as "Great Truths Popularly Illustrated" No.1, edited by "the author of English Life social and domestic", published by Blacader & Co., London.
- The Roving Bee: or, A Peep into Many Hives (1855), given as edited by, and attributed to, Whately. A plot summary from a review in The Governess from 1855: "The heroine is, by "unforeseen circumstances," induced to become a governess, in order that her brother may receive a college education."

== Mesmerism ==
The Zoist volume XXV contained an account of blindness cured by mesmerism, written at the end of 1848 by "E. W." In The Zoist, in 1850, Eliza Wallace indicated that she had knowledge of the blindness cure, associated with Elizabeth Whately, by means of a letter Whately sent to friends in Cheltenham. Wallace promoted mesmerism, with Joseph Clinton Robertson who edited the Mechanics' Magazine, and using the blindness case with the editor of the Family Herald. The author's identity was again given in The Zoist in 1852 as Elizabeth Whately. John Elliotson claimed Richard Whately as a supporter of mesmerism.

== Family ==
Richard and Elizabeth Whateley had four daughters and a son, including:

- (Elizabeth) Jane Whately (1822–1893), a religious author;
- Edward William Whately, a cleric;
- Mary Louisa Whately (1824–1889), a medical missionary in Egypt;
- Henrietta, who married in 1848 Charles Brent Wale, a barrister, son of Sir Charles Wale;
- The youngest daughter Blanche, friend of Mary Rosse, married George Wale R.N., brother of Charles Brent Wale, in 1859, and died in March 1860.

A Guide to Irish Fiction states that there was a second son.
