= Peter Labilliere =

British Army Major (1725–1800)

Major Peter Labilliere
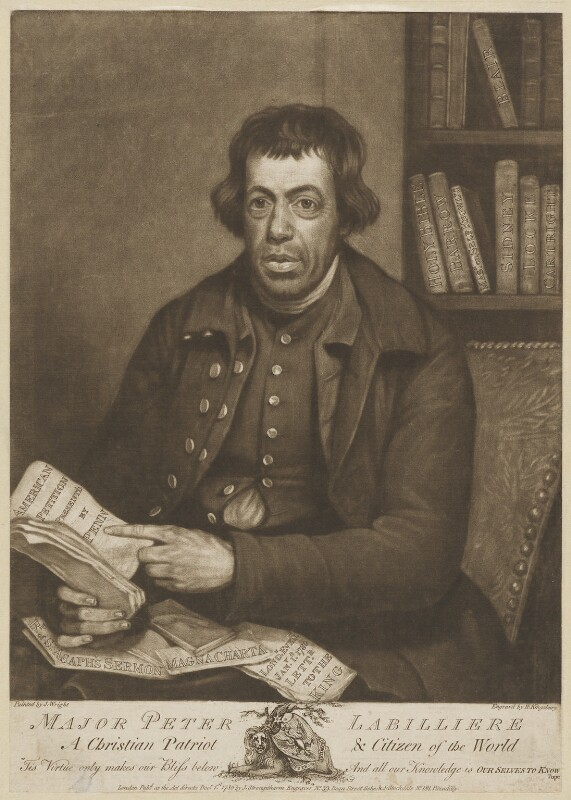
- Portrait of Peter Labilliere by Henry Kingsbury.
- Born: 30 May 1725; Dublin
- Died: 6 June 1800 (aged 75); Dorking
- Burial place: Box Hill, Surrey
- Other name: Peter Labelliere
- Military career
- Allegiance: Great Britain
- Branch: British Army
- Service years: 1744–1763
- Rank: Major
- Unit: 92nd Regiment of Foot (Donegal Light Infantry)

Peter Labilliere (1725–1800), also known as Peter Labelliere, was a British Army Major who is notable for being buried upside down on Box Hill near Dorking in Surrey.

== Biography ==
Labilliere was born in Dublin on 30 May 1725 to a family of French Huguenot descent (his family was from Aulas, in the Gard department). He joined the British Army at the age of 14, becoming a major in 1760. After leaving the army he became a political agitator and was accused in 1775 of bribing British troops not to fight in the American War of Independence, although he was never tried for treason. Throughout the 1770s and 80s Labiliere corresponded regularly with both Benjamin Franklin (at that time the American representative in France) and the Long Island wax sculptor Patience Wright. The effect of his anti-war protests on British public sentiment is uncertain, although he appears to have attracted a following of over 700 like-minded adherents, and the army was required to rely on German mercenaries, as recruitment of British troops for the war became increasingly difficult.

Labilliere moved to Dorking from Chiswick in around 1789, living in a small cottage called "The Hole in the Wall," on Butter Hill, and often visiting Box Hill to meditate. With old age he became increasingly eccentric and neglected his own personal hygiene to such an extent that he acquired the nickname "the walking dung-hill".

Labilliere died on 6 June 1800. In accordance with his wishes he was buried head downwards, on 10 or 11 June on the western side of Box Hill above The Whites. In the presence of a crowd of thousands that included visitors from London as well as the local "quality gentry", Labilliere was buried without any religious ceremony, having reportedly said that the world was "topsy-turvey" and that it would be righted in the end if he were interred thus. But this preference was not mentioned in his "Book of Devotions": rather he there said that he wished to emulate the example of St Peter, who was crucified upside-down according to tradition. (Note: Labilliere's Book of Devotions was taken by the youngest daughter of his landlady, who passed it down to her children. The book is now held by Dorking Museum along with some of his personal trinkets.)

== Former and current memorial stones ==
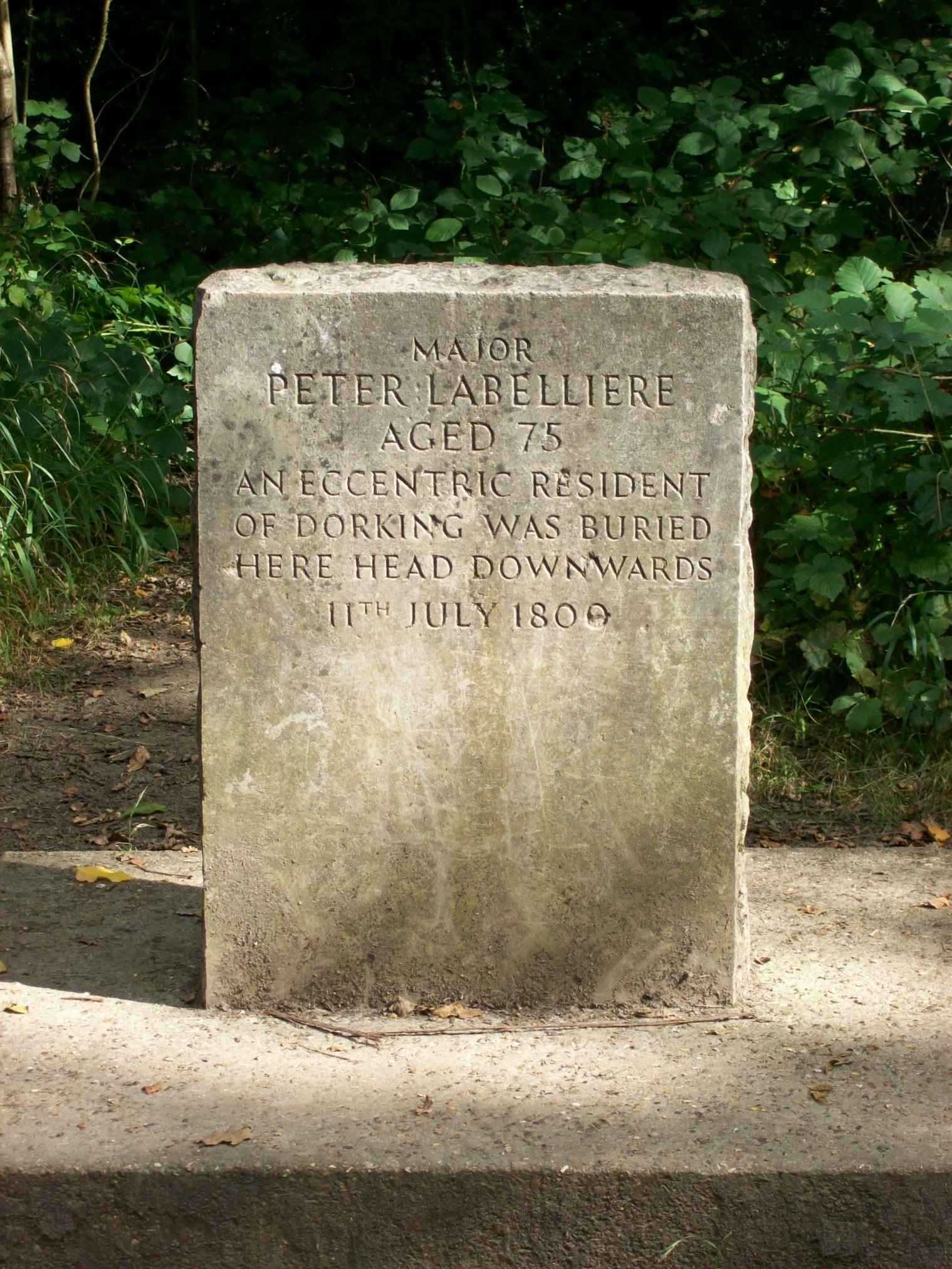
Current memorial stone on Box Hill

Labilliere’s grave, on a steep incline above the River Mole, was originally marked with a small, cube-shaped stone bearing the inscription:

Peter Labelliere, aged 76 years, an eccentric resident of Dorking, was buried here head downwards, on 11 June 1800

Note the spelling Labelliere is used, whereas all surviving manuscripts indicate that he spelt his name Labilliere. He is also believed to have been 75 years old when he died (and not 76).

The current stone, installed in the late 1950s, is on level ground, several metres to the east of the actual burial site. Although it gives his correct age at death, the stone erroneously states that Labilliere was buried in the month of July.

== Literary longevity ==
Labelliere's story was recorded (under that spelling) by John Timbs in his English Eccentrics and Eccentricities, published in 1866.

He then earned a mention (continuing the 'e' spelling) in Edith Sitwell's 1933 book The English Eccentrics, which surely draws on Timbs' description, and through which he came to feature in W.H. Auden's 1940 book of poems New Year Letter (The Double Man in the United States) (Part 1, ll. 368-82):

[We] Get angry like Labellière,
Who, finding no invectives hurled
Against a topsy-turvy world
Would right it, earning a quaint renown
By being buried upside-down;
Unwilling to adjust belief,
Go mad in a fantastic grief
Where no adjustment need be done, ..

Also from the Sitwell account, he appears as a character in the 1964 chamber opera English Eccentrics, by Malcolm Williamson.

== Works ==
- Christian political bee-hive: containing an assemblage of first principles, manifestly calculated to promote universal amity and good government and to secure real and permanent felicity to every individual who hath regard for truth and liberty or pure Christianity (1794)

== Bibliography ==
- Lander, J (2000). Peter Labilliere: The Man Buried Upside Down on Box Hill. Chertsey: Post Press. ISBN 978-0-95-324241-2.
- Timbs, John (1866). English Eccentrics and Eccentricities. Vol. 1. London: Richard Bentley.
