= Jane Whately =

English religious author (1822–1893)

- Born: 1 June 1822; Oxford
- Died: 1893 (aged 70–71); Guernsey
- Occupation: writer

Jane Whately (1822 – 1893) was an English religious author, published as E. J. Whately.

== Biography ==
Elizabeth Jane Whately was born on 1 June 1822 to Revd Richard Whately and Elizabeth Pope in Oxford. She was one of four daughters and one son. Mary Louisa Whately was her younger sister. Whately began life in Suffolk before the family moved back to Oxford when she was three. She was educated by her mother at home and she showed skill in music, French, and Italian. She learned Latin at her fathers insistence. In 1831 the family moved to Dublin in 1831 where Whately had a governess and shared her brother's tutor Revd Joseph Blanco White. Her father also taught the children.

Whately was involved in the family charity works and so she taught in the Irish Church Mission Society. As the eldest daughter, when her mother died in 1860 Whately took on many of her duties. She was responsible for looking after her father as his health failed. When he died in 1863 Whately left Dublin. She began work on his biography. Many of her works were published after this. Whately was convinced that Roman Catholism was dangerous and as a result she focused heavily on this subject as well as missionary work.

Whately's two surviving sisters had moved overseas for their health and until Whately visited each summer. She went to her sister Mary's mission in Egypt until 1889. She co-founded a school for girls there which taught in English and French. Whately herself never mastered Arabic. She also visited Henrietta in France and Switzerland. Like her sisters, Whately had problems with her lungs and was sent to Guernsey for the winter where she died on 19 February 1893. She was buried there.

== Works ==
- The Gospel in Bohemia: Sketches of Bohemian Religious History (London: Religious Tract Society, ca. 1877)
- Life and Correspondence of Richard Whately, D.D., Late Archbishop of Dublin (2 volumes; London: Longmans, Green, and Co., 1866)
- The Life and Work of Mary Louisa Whately (London: Religious Tract Society, ca. 1890)
- A Selection of English Synonyms (London: J. W. Parker, 1851)
- A Selection of English Synonyms ( Boston and Cambridge: J. Munroe and Co., 1852)
- How to answer objections to revealed religion
- Romanism in the light of the Gospel
- The story of Martin Luther
- Plymouth Brethrenism
- Home workers for foreign missions
- Maude, or, The Anglican Sister of Mercy
- Which way? : or, The old faith and the new
- The Looker on: Sketches of Sunday School Teaching at home and abroad
- Setma, the Turkish captive
- Cousin Mabel's experiences. Sketches of religious life in England
- Roman claims and Bible warrants
