= Joseph Clinton Robertson =

Scottish patent agent, writer and periodical editor

Joseph Clinton Robertson (c.1787–1852), pseudonym Sholto Percy, was a Scottish patent agent, writer and periodical editor. He was a political radical prominent in the early days of the working-class press in London, and in the debates within the Mechanics Institute movement.

== Early life ==
He was born about 1787, the son of Rev. Joseph Robertson and Isobel Mathieson of Stewarton, Scotland. Rev. Joseph Robertson was Minister of Leith Wynd Chapel, Edinburgh, Scotland, but banished from Scotland for performing illegal marriages.

== The Mechanics' Magazine ==
Robertson founded The Mechanics' Magazine in 1823, and edited and largely wrote it until the year of his death. It was a low-priced scientific weekly, and the first publication of its kind. To begin with he was in close alliance with Thomas Hodgskin: they had met in Edinburgh. It took advantage of a stamp tax exemption for technical weeklies not dealing in news. Robertson also devised a way of generating cheap content by an early crowdsourcing technique: letters to the editor were used without payment in continuing threads.

In the Mechanics Magazine Robertson first proposed the London Mechanics' Institution. The idea was shortly taken out of his hands and those of Hodgskin, by a group around George Birkbeck. Robertson became a long term critic of the Institution.

Robertson's publishers John Knight and Henry Lacey attempted in 1826 to remove him from the editorship of the Magazine on the pretext of his quarrel with Birkbeck over the Institution; but Robertson had recourse to the law and his ownership of the title. In fact Robertson had been fraudulently passing letters of credit, claiming to a partner of "Knight, Lacey & Robertson", and successfully blackmailed his publishers, whose other publication the Pulpit had an evangelical readership, by threats to their reputation. Knight & Lacey became bankrupt that year, and in a complex series of events the Mechanics Magazine was published dually for a period, two versions of the same title being produced weekly. Lacey left for the US, and Henry Kelly was brought in by Knight as a new partner. The Bankruptcy Court dealt with the matter by requiring Robertson to work on as editor, but upheld his claim to the title. By 1829, with just one more dual issue, the legal dust had settled.

== Railway promotion and journalism ==
The Mechanics' Magazine covered railway inventions increasingly as the 1820s wore on, and by the end of the decade had become a partisan of the railroad lobby who were arguing against the steam carriage, which ran on the road. Drawn into the railway world, Robertson conducted the defence for John Braithwaite and John Ericsson in their patent case, on boilers, brought by Lord Cochrane and Alexander Galloway. Buoyed by the experience, he took up patents as a further profession.

In the 1830s Robertson was a railway company promoter, initially working in 1833–4 for the London & Greenwich Railway with George Landmann and George Walter. They also employed John Herapath, a contributor to the Mechanics' Magazine, as an engineer. The subscription list was padded, and, Herapath later alleged, Robertson was responsible. Walter founded the Railway Magazine, having seen the potential in the Mechanics' Magazine and its railway promotion; he brought in John Yonge Akerman as its editor.

From 1834 Robertson was working with Braithwaite promoting the Eastern Counties Railway. He had married Sophia Brooman, related to the Cobbold family of Ipswich, and the Cobbolds came in strongly to bring a railway to their part of East Anglia. Charles Blacker Vignoles as consultant engineer gave the project credibility. Matters went downhill, however, after Robertson wrote an expansive prospectus in 1834. The land deals were slow and at high premiums, with Lord Petre presenting a particular obstacle. Herapath was brought into the company, did not fit in well, and in October 1835 quarrelled spectacularly with Robertson, who exacerbated the position with Lord Petre on what appeared to be a grudge. The required Act of Parliament of 1836 nearly missed its chance.

Herapath then acquired the Railway Magazine from Walter, and attacked Robertson in it; Robertson took legal action against Herapath for libel, via his publisher James Wyld. The founding of the Railway Times in 1837 by Braithwaite and Robertson, who began as editor, was self-defence. Robertson was undermined as Secretary in 1839, as a group based in Liverpool gained control over the company, defeating his supporters the Cobbolds. The land deal with Lord Petre hit legal obstacles in 1839, and Robertson resigned from the company on 26 February of that year. He was also caught up in a financial scandal involving his brother, Thomas Duncan Robertson.

Robertson ran the Mining, Railway, and Steam Navigation Gazette of the late 1830s, in parallel with his two other publications, as covert moonlighting. His editorship of the Railway Times came to an end in 1844, in a row with the owners over the highly critical anonymous contributor "Veritas Vincit", whose identity is not known; Peter Lecount or Robertson himself have been suggested as candidates, but the most likely was the unrelated contributor John Robertson MA. Some of the offending material appeared in the book Railway Locomotive Management, in a Series of Letters (1847) under the same pseudonym.

== Death ==
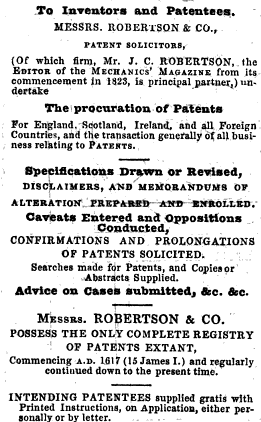
Advertisement from 1847 from the Mechanics' Magazine, for Robertson & Co.

Robertson was a patent agent in Fleet Street, where his firm carried on until 1892 as Robertson & Brooman. He died at Brompton on 22 September 1852 and was buried in Kensal Green Cemetery.

== The London Mechanics' Institution ==
Reading about Birkbeck's initial (1821) Mechanics' Institute in the Glasgow Free Press, Robertson early in the life of the Mechanics' Magazine put forward the idea that London should have something similar. In initial discussions he was conciliatory about differences between Glasgow, where the Institute had the Andersonian University to support it, and London, which would need a free-standing Institute. But on 22 November 1823 he and Hodgskin made a matter of principle of the point that accepting outside subscriptions to support the Institute would diminish the autonomy of the mechanics for which it was intended. Backed by Robert McWilliam, they lost the debate to Birkbeck and others including Francis Place, John Martineau and Richard Taylor.

Robertson and Hodgskin conceded defeat by not contesting the vice-president places in the election of 15 December that set up the Institution, though McWilliam took one place. Robertson's reputation was damaged when subscription money was unaccounted for in November 1824, with the radical James Flather most deeply implicated. At the end of 1824, as the Institution's foundation stone was laid, Hodgskin was distancing himself from Robertson and becoming reconciled to Birkbeck.

The breach was never healed, with Robertson attacking Birkbeck in print in 1835 as having the main responsibility for the "ruined" Institution. He also took aim at the Society for the Diffusion of Useful Knowledge, which Birkbeck had scruples about joining.

== Patent reform ==
Robertson used the pages of the Mechanics Magazine to campaign for intellectual property law reform. Starting in 1826, he tried to get a meeting on the topic at the London Mechanics' Institution, which flopped. In 1829 a parliamentary committee on patent reform was set up, after Thomas Barrett Lennard had pushed for an enquiry: Robertson lowered expectations in advance, and was partly justified by a lacklustre and scanty representation of manufacturing interests, with John Farey Jr. providing the bulk of detailed criticism where John Taylor and Marc Brunel showed little knowledge of the system. Lennard's resulting bill ran out of time in the next session of parliament.

One of the grievances taken up, which reflected Robertson's own status as a patent agent in private practice, was that officials within the Patent Office also acted as agents. The Mechanics Magazine favoured prison for them. In fact the profession was close to a closed shop in the 1820s, with the insiders Moses Poole and William Carpmael virtually cornering the business, and Robertson the only newcomer.

Another bill by Richard Godson and Benjamin Rotch, of 1833, was disliked by Robertson. He himself gave evidence before the Ewart Committee of 1835 on industrial design, and the House of Commons committee on patent law in 1849.

== The Trades Newspaper ==
In 1825 John Limbird was interested in founding a Mechanics' Newspaper with Robertson. The project was diverted by the intervention of John Gast's committee, becoming the Trades Newspaper of 1825 to 1827. Robertson was squared by being made editor, a decision unacceptable to Francis Place, who thought Robertson was not to be trusted, and wanted Edward Baines. In radical politics, Robertson and Hodgskin actually differed in their analysis. When Labour Defended, Hodgskin's landmark pamphlet, was reviewed in the Newspaper in 1825, there was a note of dissent from Robertson on fixed capital. This attitude diminished the ground on which Hodgskin was innovative. On the other hand, his ideas were quickly spread through the paper. Place attacked Robertson in consequence, in the Artizan.

== Works ==
Robertson wrote Lives of Eminent Scotsmen (1821). Lives of the Scottish Poets (1821–22) has also been attributed to him.

As a man of letters, Robertson is known for The Percy Anecdotes, 20 vols. London, 1821–3 (subsequent editions 1830, 1868, 1869, and various American editions). The volumes, which came out in forty-four monthly parts, were supposedly written by Sholto and Reuben Percy: Reuben was Thomas Byerley, and Sholto was Robertson. The so-called "Brothers Percy" had met to discuss the work at the Percy coffee-house in Rathbone Place in Fitzrovia, from which the work took its name. Sir Richard Phillips later claimed that the original idea arose from his suggestion, made to John Mayne and Alexander Tilloch, to file the anecdotes which had appeared in The Star newspaper over the years. The Percys compiled a collection of anecdotes, on a similar plan. Their success, which was a publishing phenomenon, was as a collection of "gobbets" suitable for social small-talk, or what in modern parlance would be a bluffer's guide to appearing well read. Lord Byron called them indispensable.

The two collaborators began a series of Percy Histories, or interesting Memorials of the Capitals of Europe, but this got no further than London, 1823, in 3 vols. Robertson also started in 1828, as Sholto Percy, an abridgment of the Waverley Novels.

== Notes ==
Attribution

This article incorporates text from a publication now in the public domain: Lee, Sidney, ed. (1896). "Robertson, Joseph Clinton". Dictionary of National Biography. Vol. 48. London: Smith, Elder & Co.
