= Walking Stewart =

English philosopher (1747–1822)

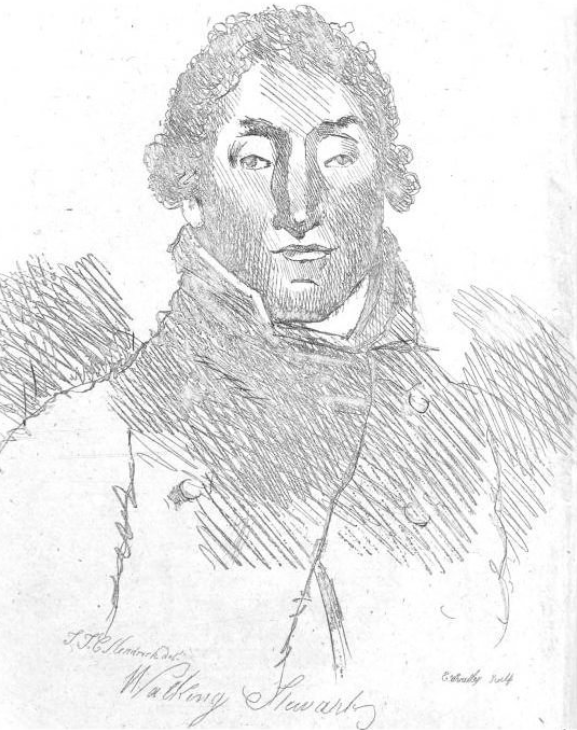
- Born: John Stewart; 19 February 1747
- Died: 20 February 1822 (age 75); London, England

John "Walking" Stewart (19 February 1747 – 20 February 1822) was an English philosopher and traveller. Stewart developed a unique system of materialistic pantheism.

== Travels ==
Known as "Walking" Stewart to his contemporaries for having travelled on foot from Madras, India (where he had worked as a clerk for the East India Company) back to Europe between 1765 and the mid-1790s, Stewart is thought to have walked alone across Persia, Abyssinia, Arabia, and Africa before wandering into every European country as far east as Russia.

Over the next three decades Stewart wrote prolifically, publishing nearly thirty philosophical works, including The Opus Maximum (London, 1803) and the long verse-poem The Revelation of Nature (New York, 1795). In 1796, George Washington's portrait-painter, James Sharples, executed a pastel likeness of Stewart for a series of portraits which included such sitters as William Godwin, Joseph Priestley, and Humphry Davy, suggesting the intellectual esteem in which Stewart was once held.

After his travels in East India, Stewart became a vegetarian. He was also a teetotaler.

== Philosophy ==
During his journeys, he developed a unique system of materialist philosophy which combines elements of Spinozistic pantheism with yogic notions of a single indissoluble consciousness. Stewart began to promote his ideas publicly in 1790 with the publication in two volumes of his works Travels over the most interesting parts of the Globe and The Apocalypse of Nature (London, 1790).

Historian David Fairer has written that "Stewart expounds what might be described as a panbiomorphic universe (it deserves an entirely new term just for itself), in which human identity is no different in category from a wave, flame, or wind, having an entirely modal existence.". According to Henry Stephens Salt, writing for the Temple Bar in 1893, Stewart repeatedly insisted upon "The immortality of matter and the sympathy that exists between all forms of nature". Stewart declared that if he were about to die, these should be his last words: "The only measure to save mankind and all sensitive life is to educate the judgment of man and not the memory, that he may be able through reflection to calculate the golden mean of good and evil".

== Retirement ==
After retiring from travelling, Stewart eventually settled in London where he held philosophical soirées and earned a reputation as one of the city's celebrated eccentrics. He was often seen in public wearing a threadbare Armenian military uniform. John Timbs described Stewart as one of London's famous eccentrics.

== Death ==
On 20 February 1822, the morning after his seventy-fifth birthday, 'Walking' Stewart's body was found in a rented room in Northumberland Place, near present-day Trafalgar Square, London. An empty bottle of laudanum lay beside him.

== Literary influence ==
After Walking Stewart's travels came to an end around the turn of the nineteenth century, he became close friends with the English essayist and fellow-Londoner Thomas De Quincey, with the radical pamphleteer Thomas Paine, and with the Platonist Thomas Taylor (1758-1835).

In 1792, while residing in Paris in the weeks following the September Massacres, he made the acquaintance of the young Romantic poet William Wordsworth, who later concurred with De Quincey in describing Stewart as the most eloquent man on the subject of Nature that either had ever met. Recent scholarship by Kelly Grovier has suggested that Stewart's persona and philosophical writings had a major influence on Wordsworth's poetry.
