= St Robert's Church, Harrogate =

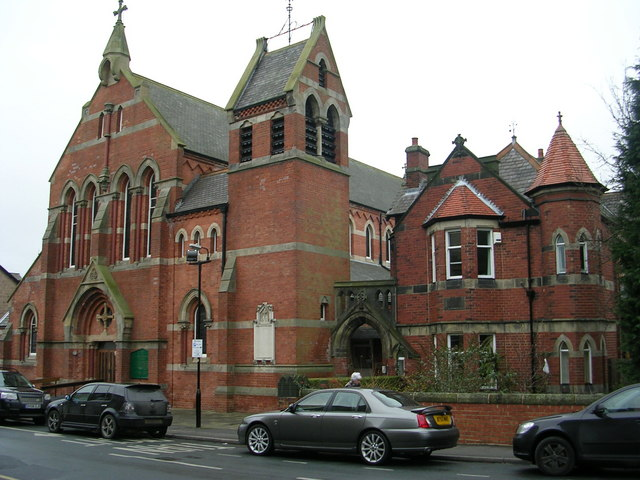
- St Robert's Church, Harrogate

- 53°59′21.64″N 1°32′13.51″W
- OS grid reference: SE 30451 54919
- Denomination: Roman Catholic
- Website: http://www.strobertsharrogate.co.uk

History
- Dedication: Our Lady and St. Robert

Architecture
- Heritage designation: Grade II
- Designated: 5 January 1995

Administration
- Diocese: Leeds
- Parish: Harrogate

Our Lady Immaculate & St Robert's Catholic Church, Harrogate is a parish church in the Roman Catholic Church located in Harrogate. It is a Grade II listed building.

== History ==
The presbytery dates from 1864. The church dates from 1873 by George Goldie and Charles Edwin Child. The church was opened by Cardinal Henry Edward Manning on 5 June 1873.

One of the priests of St Robert's was the secessionist from Anglicanism, Canon William Pope. The Lady Chapel was added in 1906 by Marten of Leeds. It is built in the Gothic Revival style. The church, including its plaster relief Stations of the Cross panels, was consecrated on 10 May 1930, by Bishop Joseph Cowgill of Leeds.

== Organ ==
An organ by William Hill was installed in 1899. A specification of that organ can be found on the National Pipe Organ Register.

== See also ==
- Listed buildings in Harrogate (Low Harrogate Ward)
