= Elizabeth Fitzhenry =

Irish actress

Elizabeth Fitzhenry (died 1790?), original name Elizabeth Flannigan, was an Irish actress.

== Biography ==
The daughter of the keeper of the old Ferry Boat tavern, Abbey Street, Dublin, she married a lodger in his house, Captain Gregory, commander of a vessel engaged in the trade between Dublin and Bordeaux. After the death by drowning of her husband, followed by the death of her father, she went to London in 1753. She became an actress first under the name of Mrs Gregory, and then as Mrs Fitzhenry after her second marriage to Edward Fitzhenry, an Irish barrister, with whom she had two children. Edward practiced law at the Inner Temple, London. He died in 1772.

Around 1774, she retired from acting to live with her children. She may have returned to the stage about 1782-3 and acted successfully in many of her old parts. She then finally retired and is said to have died at Bath, Somerset in 1790. The date and place are doubted by John Genest, a resident in Bath, who thinks there is confusion between her and Mrs. Fitzmaurice, who died in Bath about the same time. The monthly obituary of the 'European Magazine' for November and December 1790 says : '11 Dec. Lately in Ireland, Mrs. Fitzhenry, a celebrated actress.'

== Stage career ==
As Mrs Gregory Covent Garden Theatre, London

- 10 January 1754 - Hermione in the 'Distressed Mother','her first appearance upon any stage.'
- 23 March 1754 Alicia in 'Jane Shore'

Smock Alley Theatre, Dublin, under Sowdon and Victor at a salary of 300l., soon raised to 400l.

- January 1755 - Hermione
- 14 March 1755 - Zara in the Mourning Bride
- 2 February 1756 - Zaphira in Barbarossa
- Volumnia in 'Coriolanus'

Covent Garden, London

- 5 January 1757 - Hermione
- Calista (The Fair Penitent)
- Lady Macbeth (Macbeth) - benefit performance

As Mrs Fitzhenry Dublin

- October 1757 - Calista (The Fair Penitent) - Smock Alley Theatre,
- 1759–1764 - Isabella (Measure for Measure), Emilia (Othello), Cleopatra (All For Love), the Queen (Hamlet), Madane (Orphan of China), Queen Katharine.
- 15 October 1765 - Calista (The Fair Penitent) - Drury Lane Theatre, London
- 9 April 1766 - Roxanna (Rival Queens)
- 1773-4 - Mrs. Belleville (The School for Wives) - Smock Alley Theatre, Dublin. Her last recorded appearance
