= Mary Louisa Whately =

English educationalist and author in Egypt

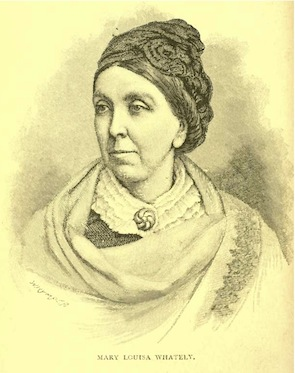
Mary Louisa Whately

Mary Louisa Whately (August 31, 1824 – March 9, 1889) was an English missionary and author in Egypt. She spent over 30 years building schools for both girls and boys, ministering to their families and writing books based on her experiences. Whately was the first to build educational facilities for the lower classes in Cairo, especially Muslim women, and started schooling for all, rather than only for those who could pay for it.

== Family ==
Mary Louisa Whately was born on August 31, 1824, at Halesworth in Suffolk, England, as the third child (second daughter) born to Richard Whately and Elizabeth Pope. Her older sister was the religious writer Jane Whately. Her father was a rector in Suffolk when Mary Louisa Whately was born, but appointed Principal of Alban Hall in Oxford in 1827, and then Archbishop of Dublin in 1831, so that the family moved to Ireland, where Mary Louisa Whately remained until she went to Egypt. Mary never married and had no children, but travelled often to visit her family in Dublin. Her mother and youngest sister died in the winter of 1860. Her father died in 1863.

== Education ==
Mary Louisa Whately had little formal education. She was taught by her well-educated parents in reading, writing and school subjects such as history, arithmetic and science. They also trained her in religious studies. She was a quick and diligent in her studies. When the family moved to Dublin, Archbishop Whately opened a school, at which Mary Louisa Whately and her siblings taught the city children. This training through teaching was instrumental in Mary Louisa Whately's later career. She was also educated in Italian and French and gained experience working with various nationalities during the Irish famine. When Mary Louisa Whately moved to Cairo, she hired a native missionary, Mansoor Shakoor, to teach her Arabic.

== Missionary gains ==
Mary Louisa Whately first moved to Cairo, Egypt, in 1860 to recover from health problems. On arriving she found a house in the lower-class area of Cairo and found there were no schools there available for young girls. She bought a second house and hired as a helper a poor Syrian girl who lived in the rooms below. This was the first school in Egypt open to Muslim girls.

In 1861, Whately moved to Pau, France, to rest and continue to recover. That winter she cared for the son of a Scottish minister who was terminally ill. Whately's work with him was instrumental in her decision to open a medical mission in 1879. In the winter of 1862 Whately returned to Cairo and re-opened the school she had started, and shortly afterwards opened one for Muslim boys. Mansoor Shakoor and his two brothers helped her teach at both schools. This allowed Whately to traverse the Nile and visit other towns and villages. She read to the women and children there and provided what education and medicine she could. In 1869 the Prince of Wales visited Whately in Cairo, which led to a grant of land to her just outside the city walls for the purpose of building a school. As this school grew, Whately decided to add a medical facility for care and training.

== Writings ==
Mary Louisa Whately wrote 12 books on her missionary work and on life in Egypt, designed to educate people in Britain about the daily life in Egypt, especially the poor. Her books Child-Life in Egypt, Ragged Life in Egypt, Scenes from Life in Cairo and Stories of Peasant Life on the Nile were some of the first of their kind for Egypt. They describe hardship and tasks that the poor and their children have in life simply to survive. Her collected works, Letters From Egypt to Plain Folks at Home, explained what Whately was accomplishing in Egypt, along with her daily life and that of the people she lived with. Whately wrote other books on certain experiences she had and people she had met. A Memoir of Mansoor Shaknoor, The Prism... and others covered people who had a significant impact on her life and ministry.

== Selected works ==
- Whately, M. L. A Memoir of Mansoor Shakoor, of Lebanon. London, England: Guildford, 1873.
- Whately, M. L.Among the Huts in Egypt: Scenes from Real Life. London, England: Seeley, Jackson, & Halliday, 1871
- Whately, M. L. Child-Life in Egypt. Philadelphia, Pennsylvania: American Sunday-School Union, 1866.
- Whately, M. L. Letters from Egypt to Plain Folks at Home. London, England: Seeley, Jackson, & Halliday, 1879
- Whately, M. L. Lost in Egypt. London, England: Religious Tract Society, 1881.
- Whately, M. L. More About Ragged Life in Egypt. London, England, 1864.
- Whately, M. L. Ragged Life in Egypt. London, England: Seeley, Jackson, & Halliday, 1863
- Whately, M. L. Ragged Life in Egypt, and More about Ragged Life in Egypt. London, England, 1870.
- Whately, M. L. Scenes from Life in Cairo: A Glimpse Behind The Curtain. London, England: Seeley, Jackson & Halliday, 1883.
- Whately, M. L. Stories of Peasant Life on the Nile. London, England: Religious Tract Society, 1888.
- Whately, M. L. The Prism. Unequally Yoked...Life in a Swiss Chalet...From Darkness to Light. London, England: Religious Tract Society, 1878.
- Whately, M. L. The Story of a Diamond: Illustrative of Egyptian Manners and Customs. London, England: Religious Tract Society, 1867.
