= Joseph Blanco White =

Spanish poet and theologian (1775–1841)

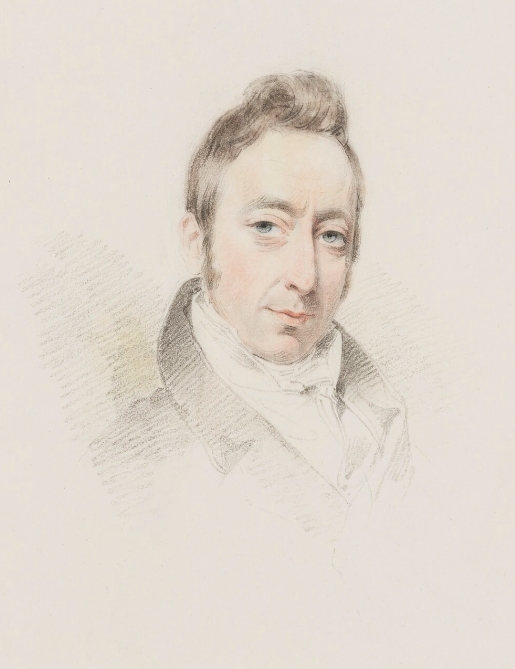
Pencil sketch by Joseph Slater

Joseph Blanco White, born José María Blanco y Crespo (11 July 1775 – 20 May 1841), was an Anglo-Spanish political thinker, theologian, and poet.

== Life ==
Blanco White was born in Seville, Spain. He had Irish ancestry and was the son of the merchant Guillermo Blanco (alias White, an English viceconsul, who had established himself in Seville during the reign of Fernando VI) and María Gertrudis Crespo y Neve.

Blanco White was educated for the Roman Catholic priesthood. In Seville, Spain, he had worked with Melchor de Jovellanos, an adviser to the king who advocated reform. After his ordination in 1800, White's religious doubts led him to leave Spain and go to England in 1810. There he ultimately entered the Anglican Church, having studied theology at Oxford and made the friendship of Thomas Arnold, John Henry Newman the Reverend E.T. Daniell and Richard Whately. He became tutor in Whately's family when Whately became Archbishop of Dublin in 1831. While in this position White embraced Unitarian views. He found asylum amongst the Unitarians of Liverpool, and he died in the city on 20 May 1841.

== Pro-Spanish America writings ==
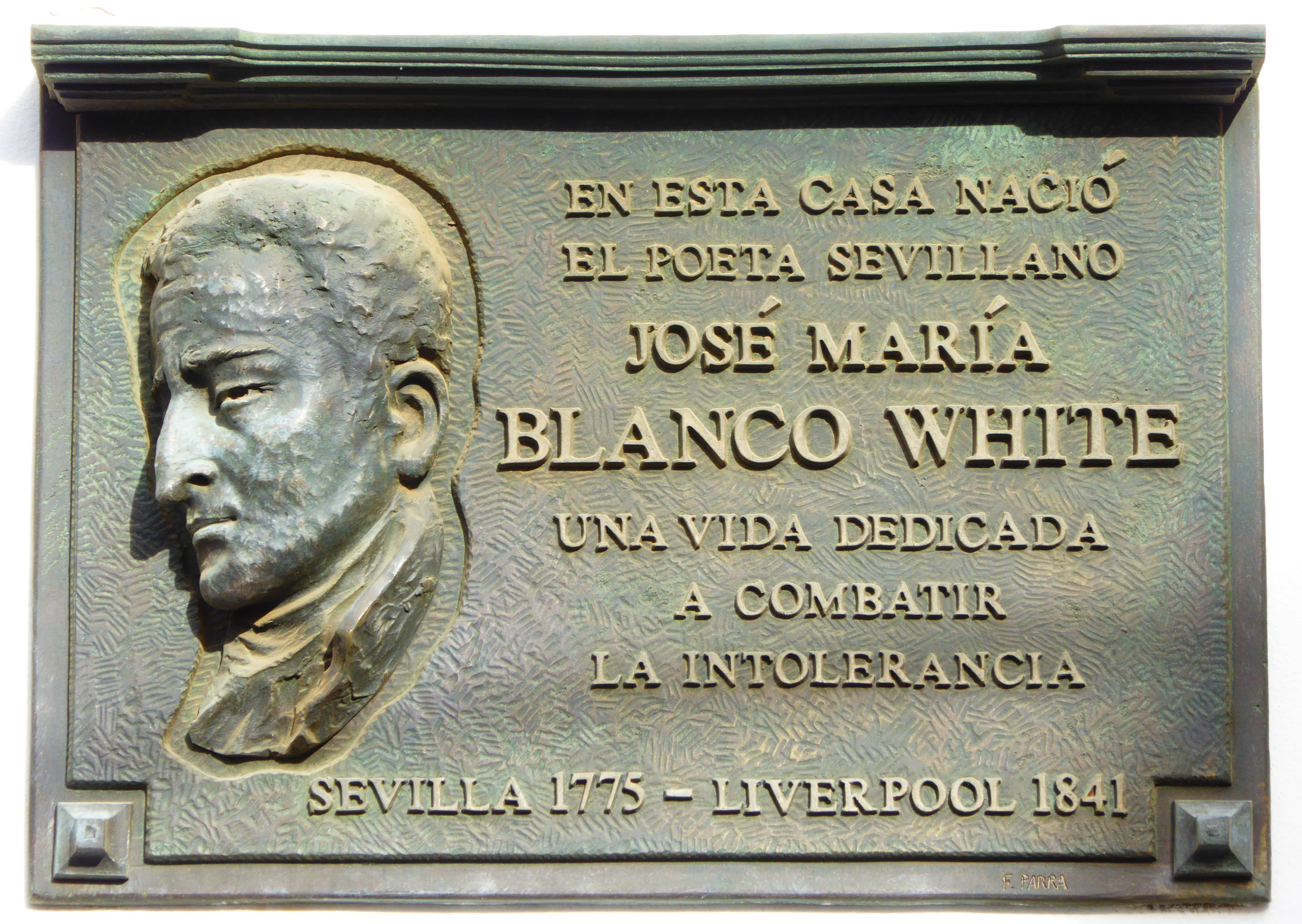
Plaque commemorating Blanco White's place of birth in Seville

Blanco White edited El Español, a monthly Spanish magazine in London, from 1810 to 1814, which was strongly for the independence of Spanish America. In its pages, he commented on the course of the insurgency based on information from Spanish America and British sources. The Regency banned it in Spain, since it undermined the pro-Cádiz position on trade, which gave peninsular merchants a monopoly on trade. Juan Bautista Arriaza published a pamphlet against him in London and he suffered other attacks in the Cádiz newspapers; even in the Cortes of Cádiz, in his session of 24 May 1811, he was attacked. Articles in El Español were reprinted in the insurgent press. He was not for complete independence for Spanish America, but rather a moderate position. He advocated that the Spanish Cortes (parliament) recognize juntas in Spanish America that remained loyal to the Spanish monarchy after the Napoleon's 1808 invasion of Spain and ouster of Bourbon monarch Ferdinand VII and Napoleon's placement of his brother Joseph on the throne. He also was in favor of free trade, not just the closed Spanish system of comercio libre that allowed free trade ports in Spain with Spanish America and all ports within Spanish America.

== Other works ==
His other principal writings include Doblado's Letters from Spain (1822) (under the pseudonym of "Don Leucado Doblado", and written in part at Holland House in London), Evidence against Catholicism (1825), Second Travels of an Irish Gentleman in Search of a Religion (2 vols., 1834) (a riposte to Thomas Moore's satirical commentary upon the conceits of the Second Reformation), and Observations on Heresy and Orthodoxy (1835). They all show literary ability and were extensively read in their day. He also translated Paley's Evidences and the Book of Common Prayer into Spanish.

White is also remembered for his sonnet "Night and Death" ("Mysterious Night! when our first parent knew"), which was dedicated to Samuel Taylor Coleridge on its appearance in the Bijou for 1828 and has since found its way into several anthologies. Three versions are given in the Academy of 12 September 1891. Coleridge called "Night and Death" "the finest and most grandly conceived sonnet in our language"; Leigh Hunt wrote that it "stands supreme, perhaps, above all in any language." Leslie Stephen wrote that it is by this sonnet that he "will continue to be known when his other works, in spite of the real interest of his views, have been forgotten."
