= John Limbird =

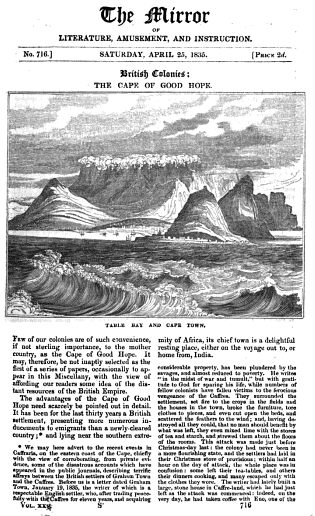
The Mirror of Literature, Amusement and Instruction, 1835, published by Limbird

John Limbird (1796? – 1883) was an English stationer, bookseller and publisher, characterised by an obituarist as "the father of our periodical writing".

John Limbird was christened on 1 May 1796 in the parish of St. Nicholas, Glatton, Huntingdonshire, the sixth child of John Limbird and Elizabeth Hitchcock. He married Lucy Glover on 7 April 1817 in Godmanchester, Huntingdonshire. He had two daughters, Elizabeth Limbird born 1818 and Sally Dolby Limbird born 1823, both baptised at the Church of St Anne, Soho, London.

From 1822 to 1847 Limbird published a tuppenny weekly, The Mirror of Literature, Amusement, and Instruction, which has been characterized as "the first long-lived cheap periodical" in Britain. It was edited by Thomas Byerley, John Abraham Heraud, Percy Bolingbroke St John, and John Timbs. Late in 1847 it became the Mirror Monthly Magazine; and from 1849 to 1850 appeared finally as the London Review. He had a shop situated in London's Strand.
