= Sarah Whitehead =

Ghost said to haunt the Bank of England

Coordinates: 51.5142°N 0.0885°W

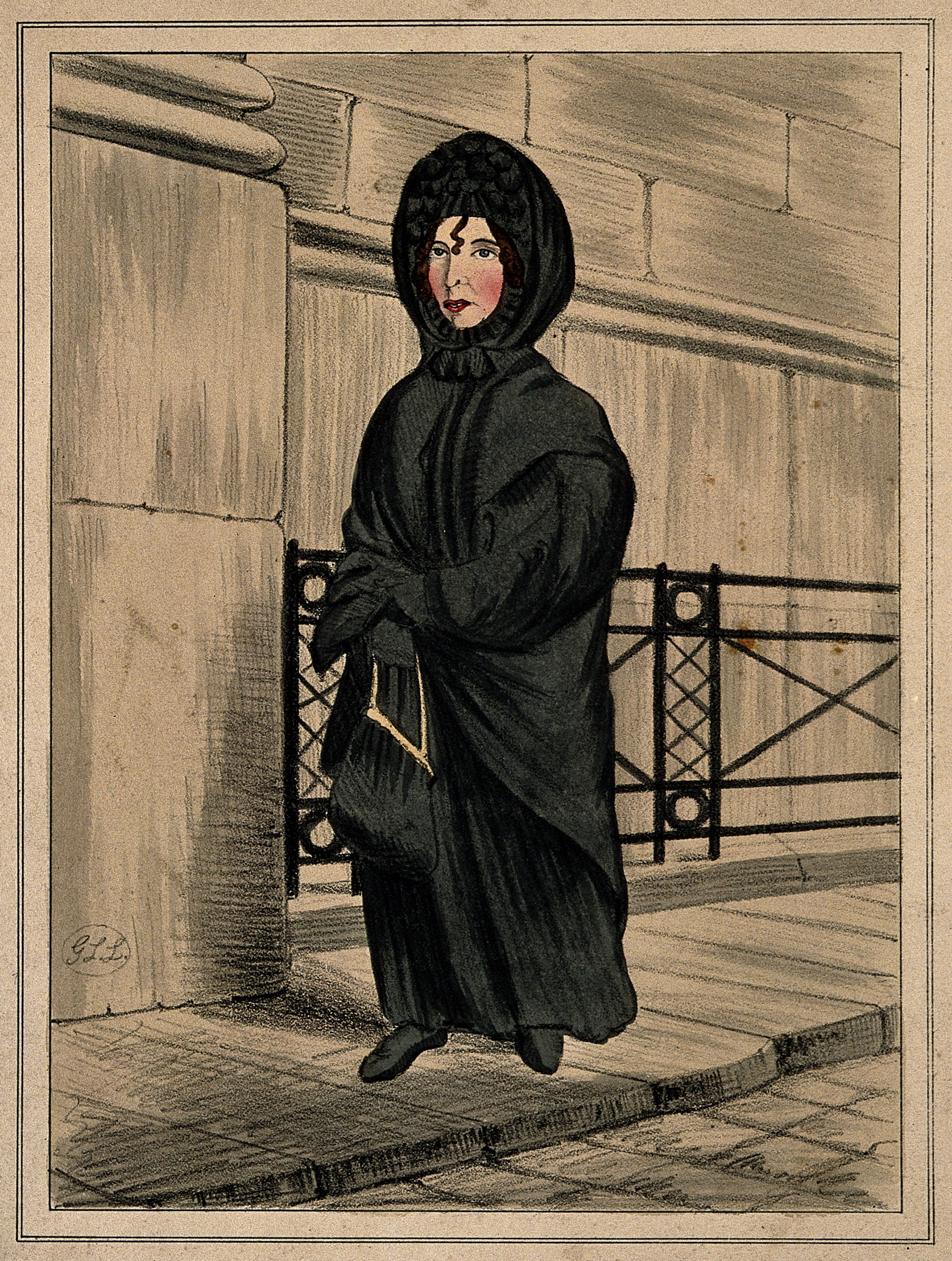
- Lithograph of Whitehead by G.L. Lee.
- Known for: Reputedly haunting the Bank of England

Sarah Whitehead is the reported name of a woman whose ghost is said to haunt the Bank of England; her ghost became known as The Black Nun.

== Background ==
Whitehead's brother, Philip, was employed by the Bank of England from 1797 to 1810. During his employment at the bank, Philip Whitehead "adopted an extravagent lifestyle" and began to speculate on the Stock Market. The directors of the bank allowed him to resign, avoiding dismissal, and he set himself up as a stockbroker. Meanwhile evidence came to light, demonstrating that Philip Whitehead had defrauded Robarts & Co. by "forging an acceptance to a Bill". He was charged with forgery in 1811, then executed on 29 January 1812.

The news of her brother's conviction and execution was kept from his sister, Sarah Whitehead, as long as possible. However, upon hearing the news, Whitehead's mental health became unstable and she visited the Bank daily, asking if he was there. The bank staff pitied her at first, but she eventually became hostile. This continued until 1818, when the Directors offered Whitehead a financial grant on the condition that she stopped coming to the bank.

Whitehead wore black crepe clothing, which was a sign of mourning, and as a result became known as the 'Black Nun'.

However, there is uncertainty over her identity, since there is little recorded evidence of a 'Sarah Whitehead' in contemporary records.

== Ghost ==
Whitehead's ghost reputedly haunts the Bank of England and the area on Threadneedle Street nearby, where she looks for her brother. Her ghost is described as wearing the same nun-like attire that she wore in life.

== Legacy ==
=== Literature ===
The story of Whitehead and later on, her ghost, was repeatedly written about and serialised in newspapers in the nineteenth century. The story was re-written as The Lady in Black, or, the Widow and the Wife by James Malcolm Rymer, as penny fiction from 1847-8. Edith Sitwell reimagined Whitehead's story in her book English Eccentrics. The myth of Whitehead's ghost appears in the poem New Year Letter by W H Auden.

=== Theatre ===
In 1861 her story was portrayed on stage at the Bower Saloon Theatre on Stangate Street, Westminster Road.

=== Hauntology ===
Whitehead's story features in several publications and events/programmes about ghosts in London, such as London Ghost Walks; 'Lates' by the Bank of England Museum; and Reader's Digest's List of '20 Most Haunted Places in London'.

== Historiography ==
Whitehead's story has been repeated in many formats, across a large number of years and the story of her ghost needs to considered against the historical background of concerns about forgery in the 1810s. The story of her brother first appears in The Criminal Recorder in 1815. Whitehead's story was first reported in The Times on 22 February 1828. This same issue said that she had appeared before the magistrate to ask for help, claiming that someone was trying to poison and defraud her. It was repeated and illustrated in Streetology in 1837. In 1841, a date of death for Whitehead is reported for the first time.
