= The Star (1788–1831) =

London evening newspaper published from 1788 to 1831

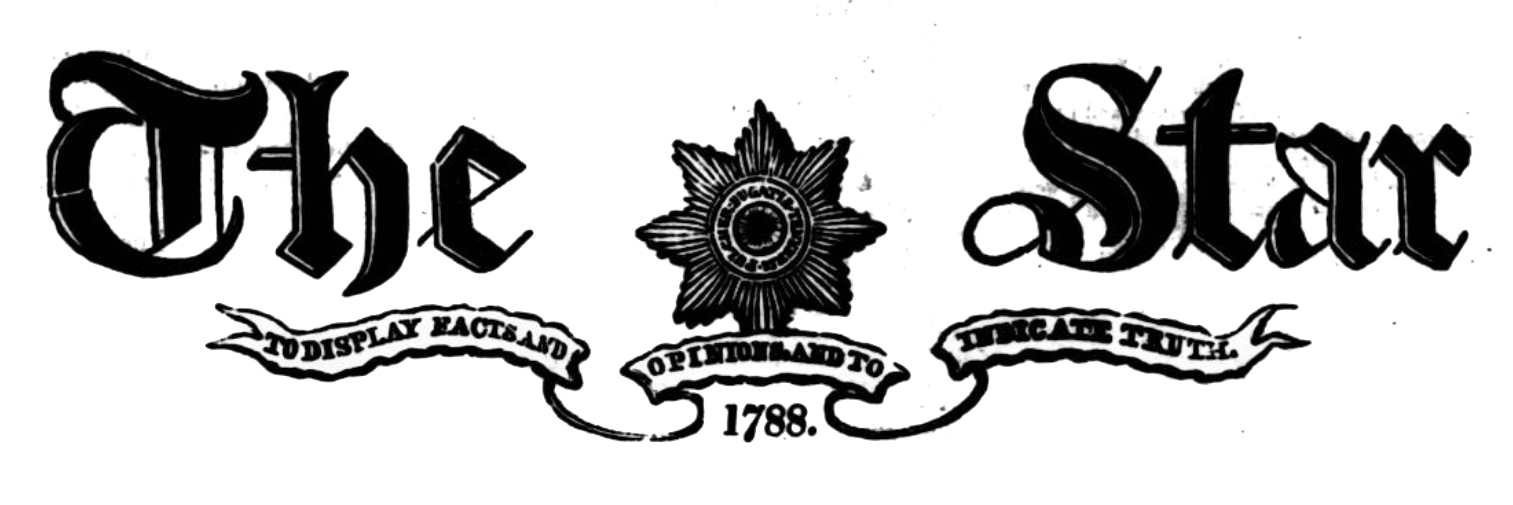

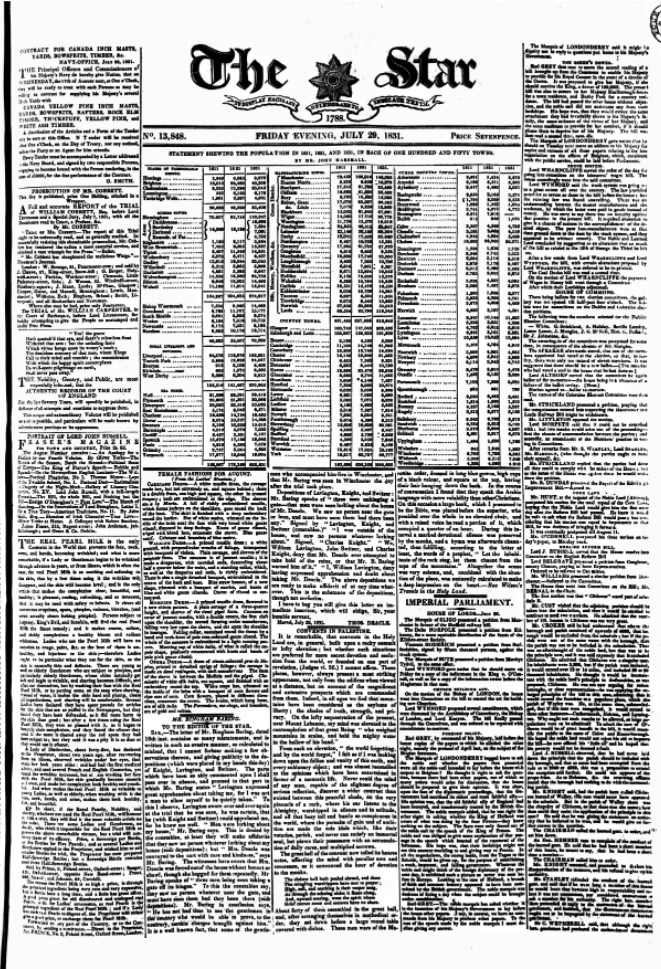
- 29 July 1831 issue
- Type: Daily
- Founder(s): John Murray; William Lane
- Launched: 1788
- Ceased publication: 1831
- Language: English
- Headquarters: London, England
- City: London
- Country: England

The Star was a London evening newspaper founded on 3 May 1788, originally under the title Star and Evening Advertiser, and was the first daily evening newspaper in the world. The paper ceased publication in 1831, when it was merged into The Albion. Founding sponsors of the new paper included publisher John Murray and William Lane of the Minerva Press.
