= Jane Lewson =

British alleged supercentenarian

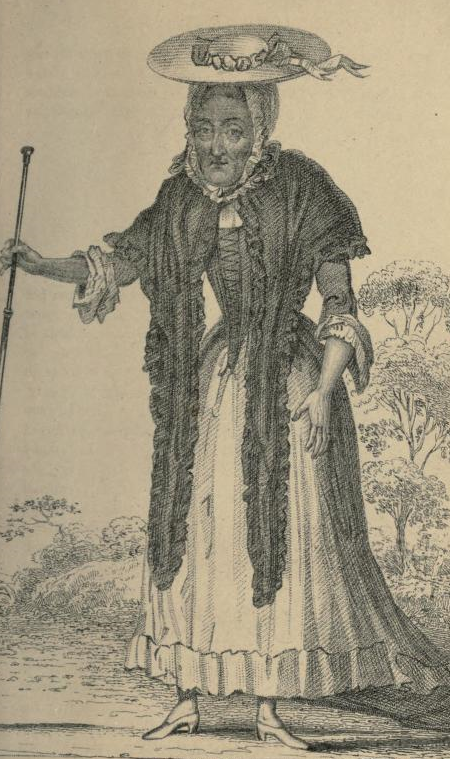
Jane Lewson

Jane Lewson (née Vaughan) (c. 1700? – 28 May 1816), commonly known as Lady Lewson, was an "eccentric woman" who claimed to be a supercentenarian.

== Legend ==
Lewson claimed to be born in 1700, during the reign of William III and Mary II of England, Scotland, and Ireland, in Essex Street, Strand, London. Early in life she married a wealthy merchant, who died when she was 26, leaving her with one daughter. When her daughter married, she supposedly rejected several suitors and spent the rest of her years as an "eccentric" widow living in Coldbath Square in Clerkenwell, London. She rarely left her home despite her considerable wealth and would not allow visitors.

Lewson became well known during her era for the fact that, until her death at the purported age of 116, she continued to wear the fashions of the reign of George I (1714 to 1727) and used a gold-headed cane, and hence she became known as Lady Lewson because of her fashion style. It was also reported that she "cut two new teeth" at the age of 87, despite having never lost one of her former set.

Lewson was known for her extreme superstition and fear of getting a cold, which led her to only use one teacup, prohibiting the use of water in her home and smearing herself with pigs fat instead of washing. She would never have her windows washed in case they were broken and let in germs. By the time of her death, it was said they had become so grimy they no longer let in light.

Towards the end of her life, Lewson allegedly kept no servant and lived with two old lap dogs and a cat for companionship. She died in Coldbath Square, Clerkenwell, London. on 28 May 1816 and was buried on 3 June 1816 in Bunhill Fields, Islington, London.

== Legacy ==
It is speculated that Lewson was probably one of several people who furnished Charles Dickens with the model for his eccentric spinster Miss Havisham in the novel Great Expectations.

Her claims of a ninety year residence in Coldbath Square are not supported by Rate Books, which record her as living there from approximately 1770.
