= Richard Whately =

English archbishop, academic, and philosopher (1787–1863)

The Right Reverend and Right Honourable Richard Whately PC (Ire)
- Archbishop of Dublin; Bishop of Glendalough; Primate of Ireland
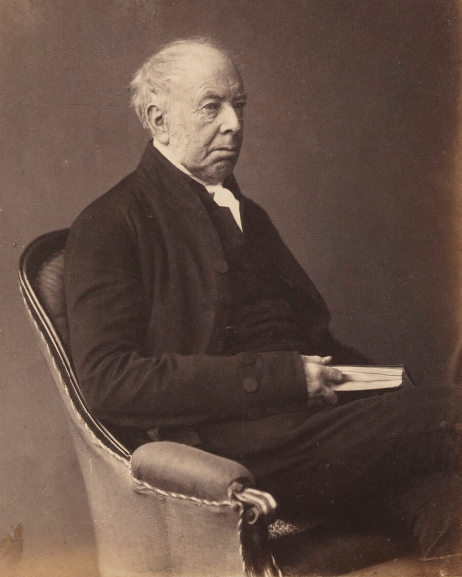
- Church: Church of Ireland
- Diocese: Dublin and Glendalough
- In office: 1831–1863
- Predecessor: William Magee
- Successor: Richard Chenevix Trench

Orders
- Consecration: 23 October 1831 by Richard Laurence

Personal details
- Born: 1 February 1787 Cavendish Square, London, England
- Died: 8 October 1863 (aged 76) Dublin, County Dublin, Ireland
- Buried: Christ Church Cathedral, Dublin
- Denomination: Anglican
- Spouse: Elizabeth Whately
- Children: 5, including Jane and Mary

Education
- Education: Oriel College, Oxford (B.A., 1808)

Philosophical work
- School: Oriel Noetics
- Institutions: Oriel College, Oxford
- Main interests: Theology, logic
- Notable ideas: Erotetics

Richard Whately (1 February 1787 – 8 October 1863) was an English academic, rhetorician, logician, philosopher, economist, and theologian who also served as a reforming Church of Ireland Archbishop of Dublin. He was a leading Broad Churchman, a prolific and combative author over a wide range of topics, a flamboyant character, and one of the first reviewers to recognise the talents of Jane Austen.

== Early life and education ==
Whately was born in London, the son of the Rev. Dr. Joseph Whately (1730–1797). He was educated at a private school near Bristol, and at Oriel College, Oxford, from 1805. He obtained a B.A. in 1808, with double second-class honours, and the prize for the English essay in 1810; in 1811, he was elected Fellow of Oriel, and in 1814 took holy orders. After graduation he acted as a private tutor, in particular to Nassau William Senior who became a close friend, and to Samuel Hinds.

== Career ==
=== University of Oxford ===
In 1825, Whately was appointed principal of St. Alban Hall at the University of Oxford, a position obtained for him by his mentor Edward Copleston, who wanted to raise the notoriously low academic standards at the Hall, which was also a target for expansion by Oriel.

Whately returned to the University of Oxford, where he had seen the social impact of unemployment on the city and region.

A reformer, Whately was initially on friendly terms with John Henry Newman. They fell out over Robert Peel's candidacy for the Oxford University seat in Parliament.

In 1829, Whately was elected as Drummond Professor of Political Economy at Oxford in succession to Nassau William Senior. His tenure of office was cut short by his appointment to the archbishopric of Dublin in 1831. He published only one course of Introductory Lectures in two editions (1831 & 1832).

=== Archbishop of Dublin ===
Whately's appointment by Lord Grey to the see of Dublin came as a political surprise. The aged Henry Bathurst had turned the post down. The new Whig administration found Whately, who was known at Holland House and effective in a parliamentary committee appearance speaking on tithes, an acceptable option. Behind the scenes Thomas Hyde Villiers had lobbied Denis Le Marchant on his behalf, with the Brougham Whigs. The appointment was challenged in the House of Lords, but without success.

In Ireland, Whately's bluntness and his lack of a conciliatory manner caused opposition from his own clergy, and from the beginning he gave offence by supporting state endowment of the Catholic clergy. He enforced strict discipline in his diocese; and he published a statement of his views on Sabbath (Thoughts on the Sabbath, 1832). He lived in Redesdale House in Kilmacud, just outside Dublin, where he could garden. He was concerned to reform the Church of Ireland and the Irish Poor Laws. He considered tithe commutation essential for the Church.

=== Irish national education 1831 to 1853 ===
In 1831, Whately attempted to establish a national and non-sectarian system of education in Ireland, on the basis of common instruction for Protestants and Catholics alike in literary and moral subjects, religious instruction being taken apart.

In 1841, Catholic archbishops William Crolly and John MacHale debated whether to continue the system, with the more moderate Crolly supporting Whately's gaining papal permission to go on, given some safeguards. In 1852, the scheme broke down due to the opposition of the new ultramontanist Catholic archbishop of Dublin, Paul Cullen, who would later become the first Irish prelate named Cardinal. Whately withdrew from the Education Board the following year.

During the famine years of 1846 and 1847, the archbishop and his family tried to alleviate the miseries of the people. On 27 March 1848, Whately became a member of the Canterbury Association. He was elected a Foreign Honorary Member of the American Academy of Arts and Sciences in 1855.

=== Personal life ===
After his marriage to writer Elizabeth Whately (née Pope) in 1821, Whately lived in Oxford. He gave up his college fellowship, which could not then be held by married men, and began tutoring and writing.

An uncle, William Plumer, presented him with a living in Halesworth in Suffolk, and Whately moved there. His daughters were writer Jane Whately and missionary Mary Louisa Whately. One of his nephews was Canon William Pope.

=== Death ===
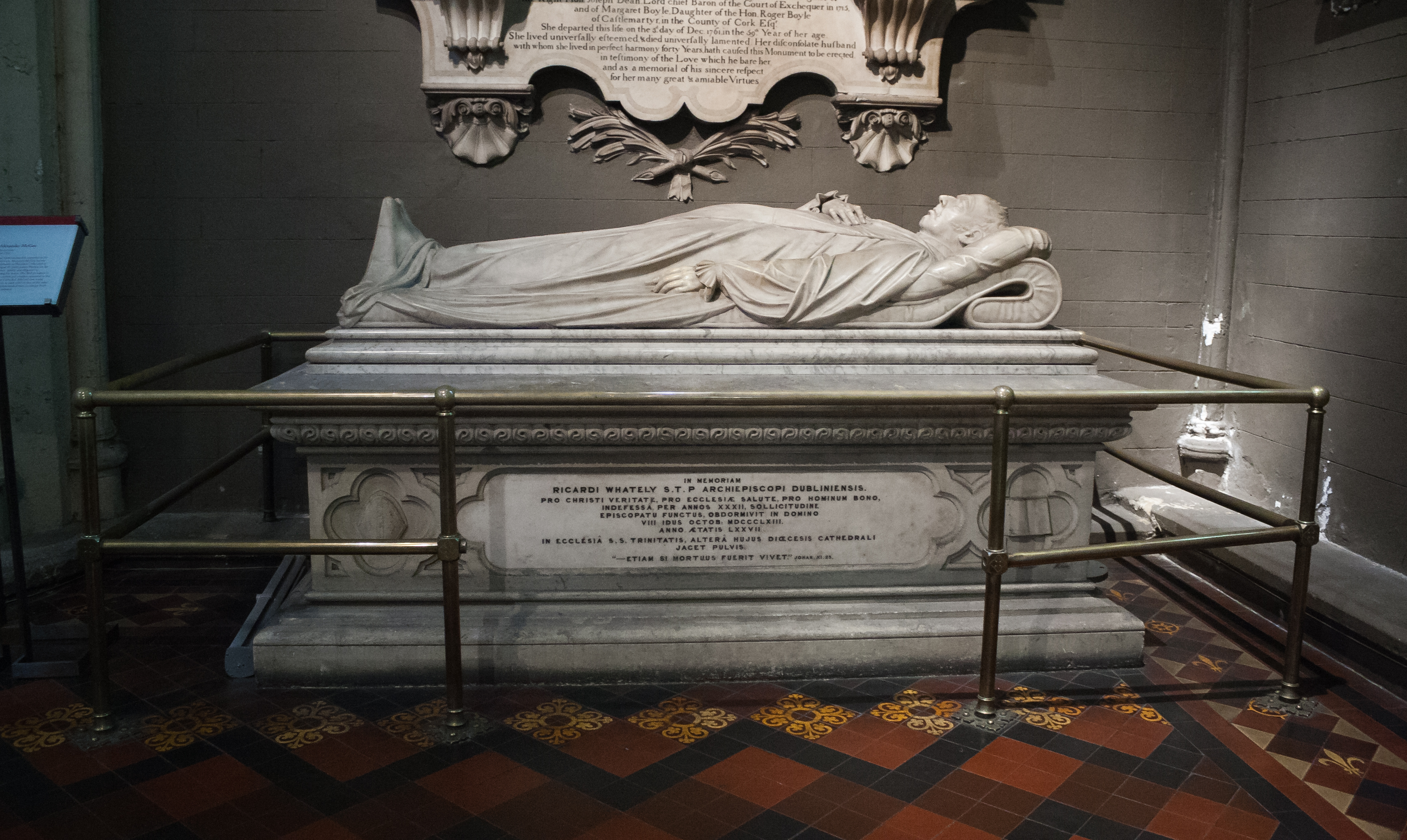
The monument dedicated to Whately in St. Patrick's Cathedral in Dublin, sculpted by Thomas Farrell

Beginning in 1856, Whately began experiencing symptoms of decline, including paralysis of his left side, but he continued his public duties.

In the summer of 1863, Whately was prostrated by an ulcer in his leg; after several months of acute suffering, he died on 8 October 1863.

== Works ==
Whately was a prolific writer, a successful expositor and Protestant apologist in works that ran to many editions and translations. His Elements of Logic (1826) was drawn from an article "Logic" in the Encyclopædia Metropolitana. The companion article on "Rhetoric" provided Elements of Rhetoric (1828). In these two works Whately introduced erotetic logic.

In 1825 Whately published a series of Essays on Some of the Peculiarities of the Christian Religion, followed in 1828 by a second series On Some of the Difficulties in the Writings of St Paul, and in 1830 by a third On the Errors of Romanism Traced to Their Origin in Human Nature. In 1837 he wrote his handbook of Christian Evidences, which was translated during his lifetime into more than a dozen languages. In the Irish context, the Christian Evidences was adapted to a form acceptable to Catholic beliefs, with the help of James Carlile.

=== Selective listing ===
Whately's works included:

- 1819 Historic Doubts relative to Napoleon Buonaparte, a jeu d'ésprit directed against excessive scepticism as applied to the Gospel history.
- 1822 On the Use and Abuse of Party Spirit in Matters of Religion (Bampton Lectures)
- 1825 Essays on Some of the Peculiarities of the Christian Religion
- 1826 Elements of Logic
- 1828 Elements of Rhetoric
- 1828 On Some of the Difficulties in the Writings of St Paul
- 1830 On the Errors of Romanism Traced to Their Origin in Human Nature
- 1831 Introductory Lectures on Political Economy, 1st ed. (London: B. Fellowes). Eight lectures.
- 1832 Introductory Lectures on Political Economy, 2nd ed. (London: B. Fellowes). Nine lectures and appendix.
- 1832 A View of the Scripture Revelations Concerning a Future State, lectures advancing belief in Christian mortalism.
- 1832 Thoughts on the Sabbath
- 1836 Charges and Tracts
- 1833 Sermons on Various Subjects
- 1839 Essays on Some of the Dangers to Christian Faith
- 1841 The Kingdom of Christ
- 1845 onwards "Easy Lessons": On Reasoning, On Morals, On Mind, and On the British Constitution
- 1856 Introductory Lessons on Morals, and Christian Evidences

(Linked works are from Internet Archive)

=== Editor ===
- William Wake (1866) Treatises of Predestination
- Francis Bacon (1858) Bacon's Essays with Annotations, See Essays (Francis Bacon).
- William Paley: (1837) [1796] A View of the Evidences of Christianity, in three parts
- William Paley: Moral Philosophy

== Character ==
Humphrey Lloyd told Caroline Fox that Whately's eccentric behaviour and body language was exacerbated in Dublin by a sycophantic circle of friends. He was a great talker, a wit, and loved punning. In Oxford his white hat, rough white coat, and huge white dog earned for him the sobriquet of the White Bear, and he exhibited the exploits of his climbing dog in Christ Church Meadow.

== Views ==
A member of the loose group called the Oriel Noetics, Whately supported religious liberty, civil rights, and freedom of speech for dissenters, Roman Catholics, Jews, and even atheists. He took the line that the civil disabilities imposed on non-Anglicans made the state only nominally Christian, and supported disestablishment. He was a follower of Edward Copleston, regarded as the founder of the Noetics taken as apologists for the orthodoxy of the Church of England.

A devout Christian, Whately took a practical view of Christianity. He disagreed with the Evangelical party and generally favoured a more intellectual approach to religion. He also disagreed with the later Tractarian emphasis on ritual and church authority. Instead, he emphasised careful reading and understanding of the Bible.

His cardinal principle was that of Chillingworth —‘the Bible, and the Bible alone, is the religion of protestants;’ and his exegesis was directed to determine the general tenor of the scriptures to the exclusion of dogmas based on isolated texts. There is no reason to question his reception of the central doctrines of the faith, though he shrank from theorising or even attempting to formulate them with precision. On election he held, broadly speaking, the Arminian view, and his antipathy to Calvinism was intense. He dwelt more on the life than on the death of Christ, the necessity of which he denied.

Whately took a view of political economy as an essentially logical subject. It proved influential in Oxford. The Noetics were reformers but largely centrist in politics, rather than strong Whigs or Tories. One of Whately's initial acts on going to Dublin was to endow a chair of political economy in Trinity College. Its first holder was Mountifort Longfield. Later, in 1846, he founded the Dublin Statistical Society with William Neilson Hancock.

Whately's view of political economy, and that common to the early holders of the Trinity college professorship, addressed it as a type of natural theology. He belonged to the group of supporters of Thomas Malthus that included Thomas Chalmers, some others of the Noetics, Richard Jones and William Whewell from Cambridge.

He saw no inconsistency between science and Christian belief, which differed from the view of other Christian critics of Malthus. He differed also from Jones and Whewell, expressing the view that the inductive method was of less use for political economy than the deductive method, properly applied.

In periodicals, Whately addressed other public questions, including the topic of transportation and the "secondary punishments" on those who had been transported; his pamphlet on this topic influenced the politicians Lord John Russell and Henry George Grey.

== Legacy ==
Whately was an important figure in the revival of Aristotelian logic in the early nineteenth century. The Elements of Logic gave an impetus to the study of logic in Britain, and in the United States of America, logician Charles Sanders Peirce (1839–1914) wrote that his lifelong fascination with logic began when he read Whately's Elements as a 12-year-old boy.

Whately's view of rhetoric as essentially a method for persuasion became an orthodoxy, challenged in mid-century by Henry Noble Day. Elements of Rhetoric is still cited, for thought about presumption, burden of proof, and testimony.

Irish historian William Edward Hartpole Lecky thought Whately’s importance and influence greater than his later historical repute would indicate, and that Whately’s unsystematic, aphoristic style of writing might explain history’s relative forgetfulness of him:

He had a singular felicity of illustration, and especially of metaphor, and a rare power of throwing his thoughts into terse and pithy sentences; but his many books, though full of original thinking and in a high degree suggestive to other writers, had always a certain fragmentary and occasional character, which prevented them from taking a place in standard literature. He was conscious of it himself, and was accustomed to say that it was the mission of his life to make up cartridges for others to fire.

In 1864, Jane Whately, his daughter, published Miscellaneous Remains from his commonplace book and in 1866 his Life and Correspondence in two volumes. The Anecdotal Memoirs of Archbishop Whately, by William John Fitzpatrick, was published in 1864.

== Notes and references ==
=== Sources ===
- Rigg, James McMullen (1899). "Whately, Richard" . Dictionary of National Biography. Vol. 60. pp. 423–429.

Attribution

Academic offices
Preceded by Nassau Senior	Drummond Professor of Political Economy at Oxford; 1830–1831	Succeeded by William Forster Lloyd
Church of Ireland titles
Preceded by William Magee	Archbishop of Dublin; 1831–1863	Succeeded by Richard Chenevix Trench
