= John Timbs =

British journalist (1801–1875)

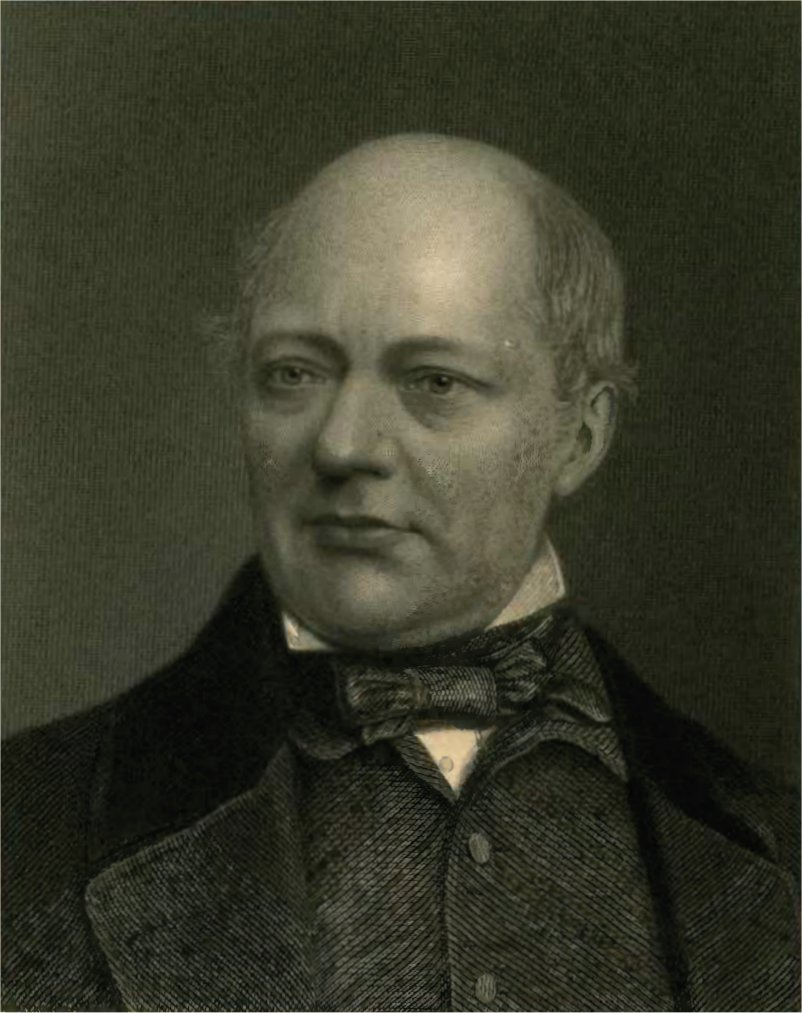
- Born: 17 August 1801; London, UK
- Died: 6 March 1875 (aged 73); London, UK
- Other name: Horace Welby
- Occupations: Author, Editor, Antiquary
- Years active: c.1820–1874

John Timbs (/tɪmz/; 17 August 1801 – 6 March 1875) was a British writer and antiquary. Some of his work was published under the pseudonym of Horace Welby.

== Biography ==
Timbs was born in 1801 in Clerkenwell, London. He was educated at a private school at Hemel Hempstead. In his sixteenth year he was apprenticed to a druggist and printer at Dorking. He had early shown literary capacity, and when nineteen began to write for the Monthly Magazine. A year later he became secretary to Sir Richard Phillips, its proprietor, and permanently adopted literature as a profession.

He was successively editor of the Mirror of Literature, the Harlequin, The Literary World, and sub-editor of the Illustrated London News. He was later to become the third editor of the ILN. He was also founder and first editor of Year-Book of Science and Art. His published works amounted to more than one hundred and fifty volumes. In 1834 he was elected a fellow of the Society of Antiquaries of London.

Timbs died on 6 March 1875 and is buried in the churchyard of St Peter and St Paul, Edenbridge, Kent.

== Works ==
Some of these were published under the pseudonym, Horace Welby. His work continued to be re-edited and republished well after his death.

- Signs before Death, and authenticated apparitions: in one hundred narratives, collected by Horace Welby. 1825
- Arcana of Science and Art: or, An annual register of useful inventions and improvements, discoveries and new facts, in mechanics, chemistry, natural history, and social economy; 1828
- Harlequin: A journal of the drama. 1829
- Laconics; 1829
- Literary World: a journal of popular information and entertainment. 1839
- Table-Wit, and After-Dinner Anecdote. 1840
- Curiosities of London. 1855
- Things not generally known, familiarly explained: A book for old and young. 1856
- Curiosities of History; 1857
- School-Days of Eminent Men. I. Sketches of the progress of education in England, from the reign of King Alfred to that of Queen Victoria. II. Early lives of celebrated British authors, philosophers and poets, inventors and discoverers, divines, heroes, statesmen &c\. 1858
- Curiosities of Science, 1859
- Things Not Generally Known, Familiarly Explained, 1859
- Stories of Inventors and Discoverers in Science and the Useful Arts. 1860
- Popular Errors Explained and Illustrated. 1862
- Century of Anecdote from 1760 to 1860. 1864
- Romance of London. Supernatural stories, sights and shows, strange adventures, and remarkable persons. 1865
- Something for Everybody; and a garland for the year. 1866
- Club Life of London, 1866
- English Eccentrics and Eccentricities. 1866, in two volumes
- Curiosities of London. Exhibiting the Most Rare and Remarkable Objects of Interest in the Metropolis; with Nearly Sixty Years Personal Recollections. 1867
- Mysteries of Life, Death, and Futurity. 1868
- Mountain Adventures in the Various Countries of the World. 1869
- Wonderful Inventions: from the mariner's compass to the electric telegraph cable. 1870
- Abbeys, Castles, and Ancient Halls of England and Wales. 1872
- Thoughts for Times and Seasons. 1872
- Doctors and Patients. 1873
