= St John Fisher Catholic Voluntary Academy =

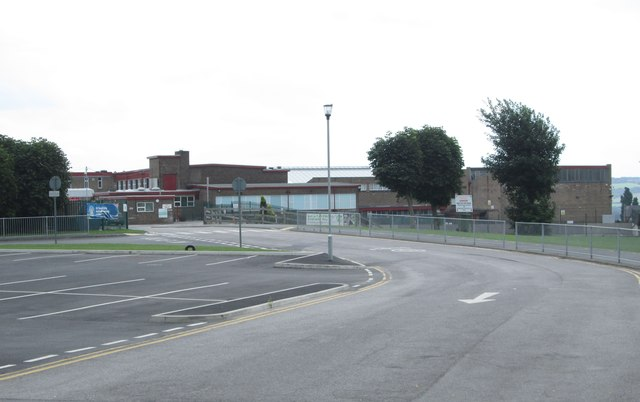
- Entrance from Oxford Road

Location
- Oxford Road; Dewsbury, West Yorkshire, WF13 4LL; England; 53.69450°N 1.64455°W

Information
- Type: Academy
- Motto: Per Crucem Vincemus ("Through the cross we shall conquer")
- Religious affiliation: Roman Catholic
- Established: 1958
- Local authority: Kirklees
- Department for Education URN: 141470 Tables
- Ofsted: Reports
- Head teacher: Karl Mackey
- Age: 11 to 19
- Enrolment: 1,200
- Website: http://www.stjohnfisher.org.uk/

St John Fisher Catholic Voluntary Academy (formerly St John Fisher Catholic High School) is a Roman Catholic Mixed Comprehensive in Dewsbury, West Yorkshire, England.

St John Fisher was opened in 1958 under the trusteeship of the Roman Catholic Diocese of Leeds to serve Catholics living in Dewsbury, Batley and the surrounding areas. It was reorganised in 1974 and the Sixth Form was added in 1979.

The school, an 11–19 mixed Roman Catholic secondary school, has about 1200 pupils on roll, including 200 in the sixth form. It has also been a specialist Sports College since 2005. As of 2019 the school's headteacher is Richard Williams until August 2020 when Sarah Wilkinson will become head but now as of 2022 Jackie Rose is the temporary Head Teacher.

== History ==
St John Fisher, built at a cost of was £225,000, was designed to accommodate 500 pupils of secondary modern standard. George Dwyer, Bishop of Leeds, opened the school in 1958 to provide a Roman Catholic education to the children of the Heavy Woollen District. In 1958 the initial intake of pupils included children from St Joseph's (Batley Carr), St Mary's, St Paulinus, St Patrick's (Birstall) and Holy Spirit (Heckmondwike). In 1974, an all-ability comprehensive intake was granted. After a campaign by governors, staff and parents, a Sixth Form was added.

St John Fisher celebrated its Golden Jubilee in 2008. This was marked by a number of special events, such as an open-air mass, a festival of sport and various pilgrimages by the different year groups in school.

In the GCSE results of 2009, 75% of students attained 5 A*-C grades, the highest percentage ever achieved by the school. However, only 38% of pupils achieved 5 A*-C including English and Mathematics, ranking St John Fisher 16th out of the 25 maintained secondary schools in Kirklees for this measure.

St John Fisher Catholic High School converted to academy status on 1 October 2014 and was renamed St John Fisher Catholic Voluntary Academy.

== Motto and Logo ==
The school motto is "Per Crucem Vincemus", Latin for "through the cross we shall conquer" (though the school no longer offers either Latin or classics as a subject). The logo is a red and white shield with a green fish in front of it. The motto is always written beneath it.

== Notable former pupils ==
- Arthur Roche – Bishop of Leeds
- Francis Cummins – rugby player for Leeds Rhinos
- Matt Diskin – rugby player for Leeds Rhinos, & played internationally for Great Britain & England
- Victoria O'Keefe (1969–1990) – stage and film actor best known for playing nuclear war survivor Jane Beckett in made-for-TV movie "Threads" (1984).
