= Cardinal Heenan Catholic High School, Leeds =

Cardinal Heenan Catholic High School
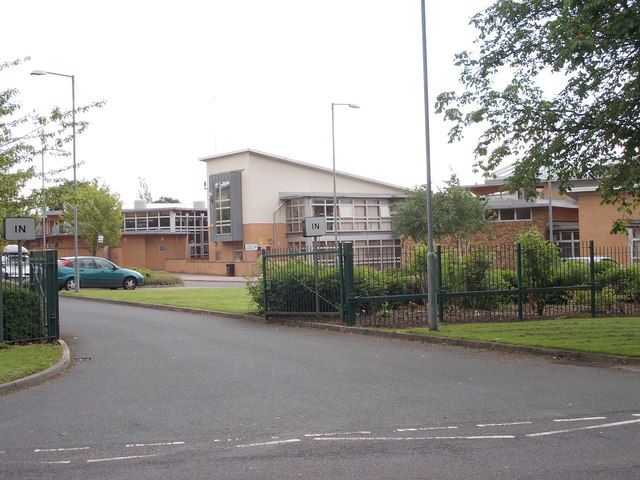

Location
- Tongue Lane; Leeds, West Yorkshire, LS6 4QE; England; 53.8387°N 1.5605°W

Information
- Type: Voluntary aided school
- Motto: Veritas (Truth)
- Religious affiliation: Roman Catholic
- Established: September 1961
- Local authority: City of Leeds
- Department for Education URN: 108095 Tables
- Ofsted: Reports
- Head teacher: Dominic Kelly
- Age: 11 to 16
- Enrolment: 908
- Diocese: Leeds
- Website: http://www.cardinalheenan.com

Cardinal Heenan Catholic High School is a comprehensive school located in Meanwood, Leeds, West Yorkshire, England.

== General ==
Cardinal Heenan Catholic High School is part of the Diocese of Leeds. It is named in honour of Cardinal John Carmel Heenan, a former Bishop of Leeds, Archbishop of Liverpool and Archbishop of Westminster.

It is situated around four miles north of Leeds city centre, just south of the Leeds Outer Ring Road.

The school is a well performing comprehensive school with, in 2017, over 76% of pupils achieving 5 A*-C grades at GCSE level - the school's best ever results.

At its last Ofsted inspection in February 2023, it was rated as a good school.

== History ==
=== Grammar school ===
The school was formerly the St Thomas Aquinas Grammar School on Tongue Lane. It was built in 1961 as a three-form entry boys' school by the City of Leeds Education Committee. The Saint John Bosco school was next door and had 600 boys and girls, and was also built in 1961.

=== Comprehensive ===
A coeducational comprehensive 13–18 school was established in September 1978, when the two adjoining schools, Saint John Bosco RC Secondary Modern School and the grammar school were merged to create Cardinal Heenan High School, as it was then known (the word 'Catholic' was added at a later date.). It had 1,200 boys and girls and around 150 in the sixth form. The school has had no sixth form since September 1989, following the re-organisation of Catholic education in Leeds.

=== New buildings ===
In September 2000 the school moved into new premises on the same site: the old buildings were demolished, although the structural 'skeleton' of the former Science block was retained, having already been incorporated into the new premises of St Urban's Primary School. It was the first Voluntary Aided School to be built on the PFI, and was identified as a 'benchmark' project by the Commission for Architecture and the Built Environment. The building has a horseshoe plan with two entrances on the North, one for the school and one for community use outside school times. These are joined by glass-roofed 'street', with department wings extending outwards, and central services and social areas on the inner portion. There are sheltered courtyards between the departments for social and recreational use. The building makes extensive use of wood, aluminium and glass. Inset on the school entrance is the school chapel with dry stone wall, and beyond this the street widens to the main foyer.

=== Specialist school ===
In 2004 the school achieved the status of Language College; it had previously been granted the status of Beacon School, a government funded programme which was phased out in August 2005. The school lost this status in 2014.

== Notable alumni ==
- Richard Burgon — Labour MP for Leeds East.
- Oliver Casey — professional footballer, plays centre-back for Blackpool.
- Paul Hunter — late professional snooker player.
- Gabby Logan — former Wales international gymnast; television presenter.
- Deborah McAndrew — actor, playwright and chancellor of Leeds Trinity University.
- Gemma Bonner — professional footballer, plays as a defender for Liverpool, as well as the England women's national football team.
