= David Konstant =

20th and 21st-century English Catholic bishop

The Right Reverend David Konstant
- Bishop of Leeds
- See: Roman Catholic Diocese of Leeds
- Appointed: 12 July 1985
- Installed: 25 September 1985
- Term ended: 7 April 2004
- Predecessor: Gordon Wheeler
- Successor: Arthur Roche
- Previous posts: Auxiliary Bishop of the Roman Catholic Archdiocese of Westminster (1977–1985); Titular Bishop of Betagbara (1977–1985)

Orders
- Ordination: 12 June 1954 by Bernard Griffin
- Consecration: 25 April 1977 by Basil Hume

Personal details
- Born: 16 June 1930 London, United Kingdom
- Died: 9 October 2016 (aged 86)
- Denomination: Roman Catholic
- Residence: Headingley, Leeds and Thorner
- Parents: Father: Antoine Konstant; Mother: Dulcie Marion Beresford Konstant (née Leggatt)
- Education: University of London, Institute of Education (PGCE); Christ's College, Cambridge (MA(Cantab)); St. Edmund's College, Ware
- Motto: Gaudium et spes

Styles of David Every Konstant
- Reference style: The Right Reverend
- Spoken style: My Lord
- Religious style: Monsignor

Ordination history of David Konstant
History
Priestly ordination
- Ordained by: Bernard Griffin (Westminster)
Episcopal consecration
- Principal consecrator: Basil Hume (Westminster)
- Co-consecrators: Gerald Mahon (Westminster aux.); Victor Guazzelli (Westminster aux.)

David Every Konstant (16 June 1930 – 9 October 2016) was an English prelate and the Bishop Emeritus of the Roman Catholic Diocese of Leeds, England. Konstant had served as the eighth Roman Catholic Bishop of Leeds, being succeeded by Arthur Roche and, before that, as an auxiliary bishop of the Archdiocese of Westminster, England's principal Catholic diocese and as Titular Bishop of Betagbarar.

== Early life and ministry ==
David Konstant was born in London to parents Antoine Konstant and Dulcie Marion Beresford Konstant (née Leggatt). He studied at Christ's College, Cambridge and graduated BA from the University of Cambridge, being later made a MA of Cambridge. In these years he also gained a PGCE from the University of London's Institute of Education. Konstant went on to study for the priesthood at St Edmund's College, Ware, leading to his ordination as a priest on 12 June 1954 by Cardinal Bernard Griffin.

Konstant was destined by his superiors to work as a teacher in Catholic schools. In 1954, he was appointed to Cambridge Technical College & School of Arts, later to become part of Anglia Ruskin University. A year later, in 1955, Konstant was appointed to Christ's College, Cambridge, and, in 1958, the University of London and its Institute of Education, the college and university that he himself had frequented. In the 1960s he was appointed assistant headmaster at the Cardinal Vaughan Grammar School for Boys, West Kensington, before becoming in 1966 a diocesan adviser on religious education. His final school posting was as acting head teacher at St Michael's Secondary School in Stevenage in 1967. His final appointment before consecration as a bishop was in 1970 as Director of the Westminster Religious Education Centre.

== Episcopal career ==
On 28 March 1977 Konstant was appointed as an auxiliary bishop of the Roman Catholic Archdiocese of Westminster and Titular Bishop of Betagbarar under the papacy of Pope Paul VI. On 25 April 1977, he was consecrated bishop, the principal consecrator being Cardinal Basil Hume, along with auxiliary bishops Gerald Mahon and Victor Guazzelli as co-consecrators.

=== Roman Catholic Bishop of Leeds ===
On 12 July 1985, Konstant was named as Bishop of the Roman Catholic Diocese of Leeds and was installed as the eighth Bishop of Leeds on 25 September 1985 under the papacy of Pope John Paul II. His episcopal motto was Gaudium et spes.

In May 2001, Konstant suffered a stroke while leading a pilgrimage to Lourdes in south-western France. Although he was able to recover and return to work, he asked that a coadjutor bishop be appointed to help him in his ministry to the Diocese of Leeds. On 16 July 2002, Arthur Roche was appointed coadjutor bishop, with right to succession.

Konstant resigned as Bishop of Leeds, aged 73, on 7 April 2004, after 18½ years in the post, becoming Bishop Emeritus of Leeds. Arthur Roche succeeded him as the 9th Bishop of Leeds.

During his tenure as an auxiliary bishop Westminster and then as Bishop of Leeds, Konstant held several other posts, mostly relating to education. These include: Chairman of the Bishops' Conference of England and Wales Department for Catholic Education and Formation, Episcopal Advisor to the Catholic Teachers' Federation, Chairman of the Oxford and Cambridge Catholic Education Board, Member of the International Editorial Committee for the Catechism of the Catholic Church, Chairman of the Catholic Education Service, Episcopal Adviser to the Catholic Institute for International Affairs, Member of the Standing Committee of the Bishops' Conference of England and Wales and Chairman of the Department for International Affairs and Committee for International Justice and Peace, Bishops' Conference of England and Wales.

== Post episcopal career ==
In 2004 Konstant was awarded the honorary degree of Doctor of Laws by Leeds Metropolitan University. In 2006, the University of Bradford also awarded him an honorary doctorate of the University. He was given these awards in recognition of his contributions as Bishop of Leeds, as well as his work in education and interfaith relations in Bradford.

Konstant died on 9 October 2016. A solemn requiem mass was held on 18 October 2016 at Leeds Cathedral, where he is buried.

== Bishop Konstant Catholic Academy Trust ==
In November 2012, several Catholic primary and secondary schools in the Wakefield area, joined together to gain Academy status from the government, as a Catholic Multi Academy Trust. The Trust, the first in the Diocese of Leeds, took the name Bishop Konstant Catholic Multi Academy Trust. Twelve primary schools and three secondary schools are operated by the trust.

== Bibliography ==
Konstant was an author, releasing several books on the topics such as Yorkshire, the Rosary and religious education to name a few. Below is a list of books that he wholly wrote, edited or contributed to:

- A Syllabus of Religious Instruction for Catholic Primary Schools – 1967
- A Syllabus of Religious Instruction for Catholic Secondary Schools – 1968
- Beginnings – 1970 (with John Cumming)
- A Liturgy Of Life – 1975
- A Liturgy Of Sorrow – 1975
- Forgiveness – 1976 (with Dolores Dodgson)
- A Penitent's Prayer Book – 1976
- Bidding Prayers For The Church's Year – 1976
- Religious Education for Catholic Secondary Schools: The First Three Years – 1976
- Jesus Christ: The Way, The Truth, The Life 1981
- Jesus Christ: The Way, The Truth, The Life: Praying the Rosary – 1985
- Jesus Christ: The Way, The Truth, The Life: Praying The Gospel – 1996
- The Faith of the Catholic Church: A Summary – 2000
- Jesus Christ: The Way, The Truth, The Life – 2001 (revised and expanded edition)
- The Mysteries of the Rosary – 2006
- Bread Broken: journey through the Cross – 2008 (DVD published 2009)
- Post Scripts: Some Pieces from Yorkshire – 2009

Catholic Church titles
Preceded by William Wheeler	Bishop of Leeds; 1985–2004	Succeeded by Arthur Roche
