= Cardinal Heenan (disambiguation) =

Cardinal Heenan may refer to:

- John Heenan (cardinal), Bishop of Leeds, Archbishop of Liverpool
- Cardinal Heenan Catholic High School, Leeds
- Cardinal Heenan Catholic High School, Liverpool
