= Arthur Edmund Grimshaw =

English painter

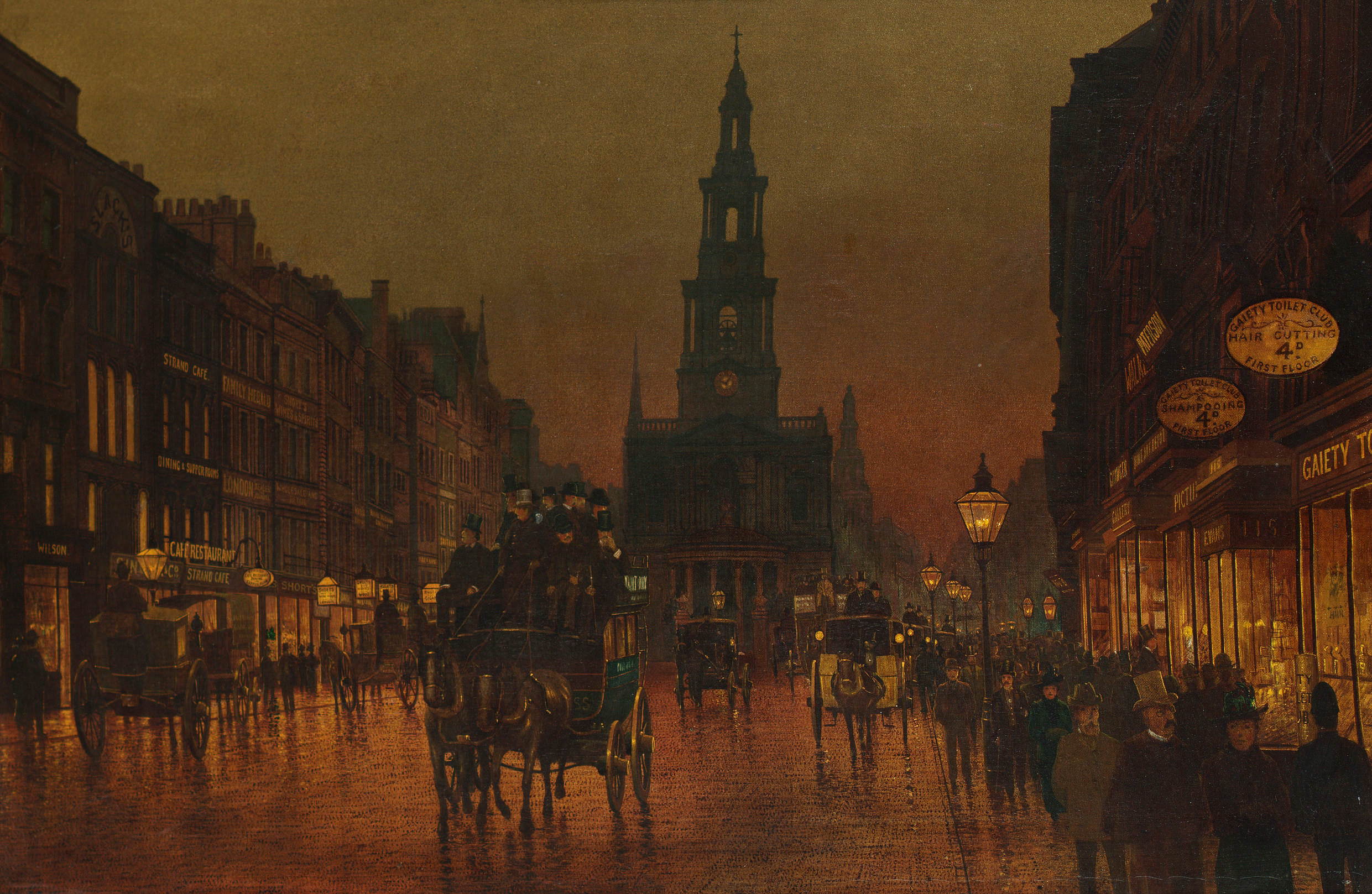
The Strand, painted by Grimshaw in 1899

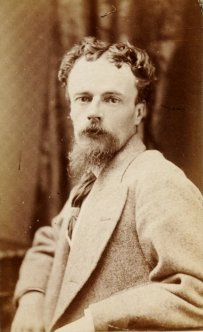
Arthur Grimshaw's father, John Atkinson Grimshaw

Arthur Edmund Grimshaw (1864 – July 1913) was an artist, composer, organist and conductor. He was born in Leeds, was the master of the choir at Leeds Cathedral, and was a conductor of the Leeds Symphony Orchestra.

== Family ==
He was the son of John Atkinson Grimshaw (1836–1893), a painter from Leeds. John Atkinson Grimshaw had several children and he chose to name them all after fictional characters in the Idylls of the King by Alfred, Lord Tennyson. As well as Grimshaw some of them also became painters such as Louis H. Grimshaw (1870–1944), Wilfred Grimshaw (1871–1937) and Elaine Grimshaw (1877–1970).

== Musician ==
In 1878, the Roman Catholic Diocese of Leeds was created and St Anne's Church became a cathedral. Five years later, in 1883, it was decided that a choir would be created. Arthur Grimshaw became the first choir master and organist of Leeds cathedral. Because of his role of the founder of cathedral musical heritage he was regarded by the congregation at Leeds Cathedral as the 'father' of the cathedral's music. He remained as the organist and master of the cathedral choir when the original cathedral was demolished in 1899 and a new one built. When he had to be at the organ console for a piece of music, the choir was conducted by Austin Mahoney.

He was one of the first conductors of the Leeds Symphony Society (now the Leeds Symphony Orchestra) which was founded in 1890. He led them from 1896 until 1911. He also composed various pieces. He wrote church music including a setting for Psalm 141 and from 1891 to 1892 he wrote two operettas, El Escribano and Amarnthus.

He remained as choir master and organist for thirty years, until his death in July 1913. He was succeeded as organist by Henry Alban Chambers, from Grimshaw's choir. At the time of his appointment, Chambers was eleven years old.

== Artist ==
Grimshaw followed his father's style by painting moonlight scenes and winter landscapes. His paintings focused on the streets and docklands of large northern cities in Britain including Glasgow, Liverpool and Leeds. However, unlike his father who had work exhibited at the Royal Academy of Arts, he is not known to have any of his work exhibited in London. All of his known paintings date from 1890 to 1900. After a revival of interest in his father's work, more attention was paid to Grimshaw's paintings in the late twentieth century.

== Death ==
Grimshaw was found dead on Hawksworth Moor, near Ilkley, West Riding of Yorkshire, on Friday 1 August 1913.

The month before, on 8 July, he had left his sister's house in Caledonian Road, Leeds, where he lodged, without informing his sister of his departure. She became alarmed the following day when he had failed to return home the previous evening. West Riding police were informed of the mysterious disappearance and extensive enquiries failed to locate Grimshaw.

On 1 August a gamekeeper working on Hawksworth Moor found Grimshaw's body lying in a stream on the moor. The body was taken to Gaping Goose farm, formerly 'The Gaping Goose Inn', Hillings Lane, two miles from Cockle Springs Beck, where the body was discovered.

At the inquest, held at Gaping Goose Farm, the Coroner was told that Grimshaw knew the area and had walked on the moors with friends. Doctor Johnstone, who performed the autopsy, stated that Mr Grimshaw had a very dilated heart, which led to heart disease.

The verdict of the jury was 'heart failure' due to 'over-exertion'.

== See also ==
- John Atkinson Grimshaw
- Leeds Cathedral
