= Arthur Roche =

English Catholic prelate (born 1950)

His Eminence Arthur Roche
- Prefect of the Dicastery for Divine Worship and the Discipline of the Sacraments
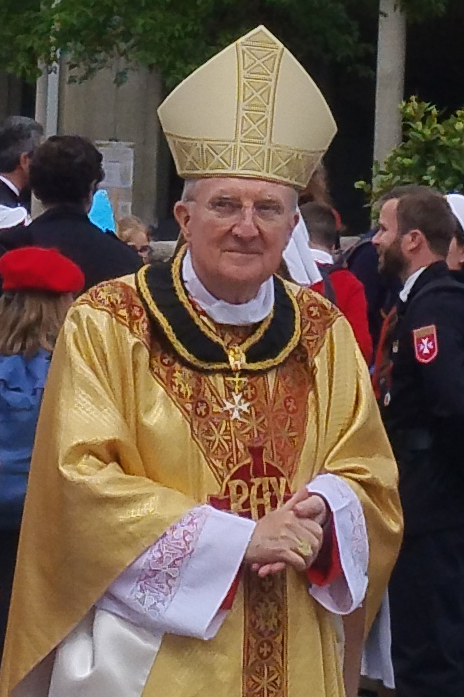
- Roche in 2026
- Church: Catholic Church
- Appointed: 27 May 2021
- Predecessor: Robert Sarah
- Other post: Cardinal-Deacon of San Saba
- Previous posts: Secretary of the Congregation for Divine Worship and the Discipline of the Sacraments (2012‍–‍2021); Apostolic Administrator of Leeds (2012); Bishop of Leeds (2004‍–‍2012); Coadjutor Bishop of Leeds (2002‍–‍2004); Auxiliary Bishop of the Westminster & Titular Bishop of Rusticiana (2001‍–‍2002)

Orders
- Ordination: 19 July 1975 by Gordon Wheeler
- Consecration: 10 May 2001 by Cormac Murphy-O'Connor
- Created cardinal: 27 August 2022 by Pope Francis
- Rank: Cardinal Deacon

Personal details
- Born: Arthur Roche; 6 March 1950 (age 76) Batley Carr, West Riding of Yorkshire, England
- Education: Pontifical Gregorian University
- Motto: Duc in Altum (Latin for 'Put out into the deep')

Styles of Arthur Roche
- Reference style: His Eminence
- Spoken style: Your Eminence
- Religious style: Cardinal
- Informal style: Cardinal

Ordination history of Arthur Roche
History
Priestly ordination
- Ordained by: William Wheeler
Episcopal consecration
- Principal consecrator: Cormac Murphy-O'Connor
- Co-consecrators: David Konstant, Victor Guazzelli
Cardinalate
- Elevated by: Pope Francis

Arthur Roche (born 6 March 1950) is a British prelate and cardinal of the Catholic Church. He has been prefect of the Dicastery for Divine Worship and the Discipline of the Sacraments since 2021. He was previously secretary of the congregation from 2012 to 2021.

Before his service in the Roman Curia, Roche was Bishop of Leeds from 2004 to 2012. He was coadjutor bishop of Leeds under Bishop David Konstant (2002–2004) and before that an auxiliary bishop of the Archdiocese of Westminster (2001–2002). He was appointed an archbishop when he joined the Roman Curia in 2012.

On 27 August 2022, Pope Francis elevated him to the College of Cardinals.

== Early life and ministry ==
Arthur Roche was born in Batley Carr in the West Riding of Yorkshire, England, to Arthur and Frances Roche. He attended St Joseph's Primary School, St John Fisher High School and Christleton Hall. From 1969 to 1975, he studied at St Alban's College in Valladolid, Spain, where he obtained a degree in theology from the Comillas Pontifical University. Upon his return to England, he was ordained to the priesthood by Bishop William Gordon Wheeler for the Catholic Diocese of Leeds on 19 July 1975.

Roche's first appointment in the diocese was as assistant priest at Holy Rood Church in Barnsley until 1978, when he became private secretary to Bishop Wheeler. He was appointed vice-chancellor of the diocese in 1979. From 1982 to 1989, he was on the staff of St Anne's Cathedral in Leeds and helped to organise the visit of Pope John Paul II to York in May 1982.

Roche was the diocesan financial secretary from 1986 to 1991 and parish priest at St Wilfrid's Church from 1989 to 1991. In 1991, he studied at the Pontifical Gregorian University, earning a Licence in Theology (STL). He then became spiritual director of the Venerable English College, Rome. He was appointed general secretary of the Catholic Bishops' Conference of England and Wales in April 1996 and given the title of monsignor.

== Auxiliary bishop of Westminster ==
On 12 April 2001, Pope John Paul II named Roche an auxiliary bishop of Westminster and titular bishop of Rusticiana. He received his episcopal consecration on the following 10 May at Westminster Cathedral from Cardinal Cormac Murphy-O'Connor, with Bishops David Konstant and Victor Guazzelli serving as co-consecrators.

== Coadjutor and Bishop of Leeds ==
Roche was named coadjutor to the Bishop of Leeds, David Konstant, on 16 July 2002. Roche became the ninth bishop of Leeds when Pope John Paul accepted Bishop Konstant's resignation on health grounds on 7 April 2004.

In the Leeds diocese, in 2008 Roche's plans to close seven parishes produced vigorous protests, especially on the part of a parish in Allerton Bywater that offers Mass in Latin.

Roche had been mentioned as a possible successor to Cardinal Murphy-O'Connor as Archbishop of Westminster, head of the Catholic Church in England and Wales. He was even said to be the cardinal's favoured candidate. His name had also been mentioned as a possible successor to Archbishop Kevin McDonald as Archbishop of Southwark. Whilst Bishop of Leeds, he was appointed a Patron of the Newman Society in Oxford.

=== International Commission on English in the Liturgy ===
In July 2002, while continuing as bishop of Leeds, Roche was elected chairman of the International Commission on English in the Liturgy, which oversees the translation of the Latin liturgical texts into English. The commission had failed to win the Holy See's confirmation of its 1998 translation of the Missal, and Roche's appointment, along with replacement of staff, was part of an overhaul to ensure a more accurate translation that an increasing number of bishops and Vatican officials had wanted over the years. (Note: Roche was not as clearly aligned with one side in the translation dispute as were other Commission members.)

As the chairman of the International Commission on English in the Liturgy, it fell to Roche to superintend the final stages of the work and then to announce that the new translation of the Missal into English was ready. There followed a positive outcome of voting on the text by all English-speaking episcopal conferences throughout the world. This new translation of the Roman Missal was introduced into Catholic parishes in the United Kingdom in September 2011.

== Dicastery for Divine Worship ==
On 26 June 2012, Pope Benedict XVI appointed Roche as secretary of the Congregation for Divine Worship and the Discipline of the Sacraments (CDW) and raised him to the rank of archbishop. (Note: Roche replaced Archbishop Augustine Di Noia, who said he was "flabbergasted" by his reassignment from being secretary of the CDW to vice-president of the Pontifical Commission "Ecclesia Dei" after just three years.) As secretary, he maintained the low profile typical of his curial rank, signing statements and doing press relations in tandem with the prefect of the CDW, until 2014 Cardinal Antonio Cañizares Llovera and from 2014 to 2021 Cardinal Robert Sarah. In 2016, he explained Pope Francis' decision to allow the Holy Thursday footwashing ceremony to include women. He described it as a return to practices before Pope Pius XII reorganised Holy Week services in 1955. He contradicted press reports that Cardinal Sarah was at odds with the Pope on this change. He said, "I'm not aware of that, and I'm [Sarah's] closest collaborator."

Pope Francis asked him, in December 2016, to chair an informal commission to determine who should have responsibility for translating liturgical texts into the vernacular. In September 2017, when Francis released his document Magnum principium, giving national bishops' conferences the dominant role and constraining the authority of the CDW, Roche alone authored the CDW's accompanying commentary.

On 29 March 2014, Pope Francis named Roche a member of the Pontifical Council for Culture. On 29 July 2019, Pope Francis named him a member of the group that reviews appeals of convictions for delicta graviora, the gravest crimes dealt with by the Congregation for the Doctrine of the Faith. (Note: Though news reports underscore the fact that this includes clerical sexual abuse of minors, a subject of intense interest, many of the offenses at issue are closely related to the work of the CDW, notably violations of the norms for the Eucharist and Penance.)

On 27 May 2021, Pope Francis named him prefect of the CDW. With this appointment, Roche became the highest-ranking English cleric in the Vatican. On 13 July 2022, Pope Francis named him a member of the Dicastery for Bishops. On 27 August 2022, Pope Francis created him a Cardinal-Deacon of San Saba as his deaconry.

He participated as a cardinal elector in the 2025 papal conclave that elected Pope Leo XIV.

=== Traditionis Custodes and restrictions on the Missal of 1962 ===
A few months into Roche's tenure as prefect, Pope Francis issued the motu proprio, Traditionis Custodes, which significantly restricted the celebration of the Tridentine Mass of the Roman Rite. Roche and his congregation were tasked with implementing the motu proprio. On 18 December 2021, Roche issued a Responsa ad Dubia concerning Traditionis Custodes. In this document restrictions were clarified, including restrictions on the celebration of sacraments according to the old rite and a total ban on the celebration of the sacraments of Holy Orders and Confirmation according to the old rite. Roche has also stated that the promotion of the Traditional Latin Mass has been "curtailed" and that the permission to celebrate the old rite is a concession being made to those who are attached to the old rite but is not an opportunity for the old rite to be promoted.

==== Criticism over the suppression of the Traditional Latin Mass ====
Roche has come under criticism from numerous groups for his role in the implementation of Traditionis Custodes, with some proponents of the Tridentine Mass claiming the steps that are being taken by Roche are "cruel", "unnecessarily harsh" or even unlawful according to canon law. Roche added authorising the Traditional Latin Mass in parishes to a very small list of decisions previously reserved to the Holy See. In a letter to Cardinal Vincent Nichols, Archbishop of Westminster, Roche wrote that Pope Paul VI had "abrogated" the old rite. Roche's statement seemed to contradict Pope Benedict XVI's declaration in his 2007 motu propio, Summorum Pontificum, that the old rite had never been abrogated.

== See also ==
- Cardinals created by Pope Francis

== External sources ==
- "Roche Card. Arthur". Holy See Press Office. Archived from the original on 28 August 2022.
- "Archbishop Arthur Roche". Catholic Hierarchy. ^{[self-published]}

Catholic Church titles
Preceded by Álvaro Corrada del Río	Titular Bishop of Rusticiana; 2001–2002	Succeeded by Pierre Nguyên Van Tot
Preceded by David Every Konstant	Bishop of Leeds; 2004–2012 (Coadjutor bishop 2002–2004)	Succeeded by Marcus Stock
Preceded by Joseph Augustine Di Noia OP	Secretary of the Congregation for Divine Worship; 2012–2021	Succeeded by Vittorio Francesco Viola
Preceded by Robert Sarah	Prefect of the Dicastery for Divine Worship; 2021–present	Incumbent
