= Gordon Wheeler =

English prelate

The Right Reverend Gordon Wheeler
- Bishop emeritus of Leeds
- Church: Catholic Church
- Diocese: Leeds
- Appointed: 25 April 1966
- Installed: 27 June 1966
- Term ended: 12 July 1985
- Predecessor: George Dwyer
- Successor: David Konstant
- Other posts: Coadjutor Bishop of Middlesbrough (1964–1966); Titular Bishop of Theudalis (1964–1966)

Orders
- Ordination: 31 March 1940 by Arthur Hinsley
- Consecration: 19 March 1964 by Eugenio Cardinale

Personal details
- Born: William Gordon Wheeler; 5 May 1910 Saddleworth, Yorkshire, England
- Died: 21 February 1998 (aged 87) Leeds, Yorkshire, England
- Buried: St Edward King and Confessor Church, Clifford, West Yorkshire, England
- Denomination: Church of England (Birth–1936); Catholic (1936–death)
- Residence: Eltofts, Thorner, Leeds
- Education: University College, Oxford, Beda College
- Motto: Veritas et Caritas (Latin for In Truth and Love)

Styles of William Gordon Wheeler
- Reference style: The Right Reverend
- Spoken style: My Lord
- Religious style: Monsignor

Ordination history of Gordon Wheeler
History
Priestly ordination
- Ordained by: Arthur Hinsley (Westminster)
Episcopal consecration
- Principal consecrator: Eugenio Cardinale (Nepte)
- Co-consecrators: George Brunner (Middlesbrough); George Laurence Craven (Sebastopolis in Armenia)
Episcopal succession
Bishops consecrated by Gordon Wheeler as principal consecrator
- Gerald Moverley: 25 January 1968

William Gordon Wheeler (5 May 1910 – 21 February 1998) was an English prelate and the Bishop of Leeds. Before that, he served as coadjutor bishop of the Diocese of Middlesbrough and as titular bishop of Theudalis.

== Early life ==
Wheeler was born on 5 May 1910 in Saddleworth in the West Riding of Yorkshire, England, to Frederick (1880–1971) and Marjorie Wheeler (1881–1938). From 1924 to 1929, he was educated at Manchester Grammar School, then an all-boys free grammar school in Manchester. He studied history at University College, Oxford, graduating with a Bachelor of Arts (BA) degree in 1932. He was strongly influenced by the Anglo-Catholic tradition of the church in Worsley which he attended during his time at the grammar school.

== Career ==
=== Church of England ===
From 1932 to 1933, Wheeler trained for holy orders in the Church of England at St Stephen's House, Oxford. He was ordained as a deacon in December 1933 by George Bell, Bishop of Chichester, and as an Anglican priest in December 1934 by Edmund Pearce, Bishop of Bristol. He began his ministry as a curate at St Bartholomew's Church, Brighton in 1933, and then at St Mary and All Saints, Chesterfield in 1934. He was an assistant chaplain at Lancing College, then an all-boys public boarding school, in 1935.

During this period, Wheeler became more and more convinced by the writings of Cardinal John Henry Newman, once also a priest of the Church of England and a leader of the Oxford Movement before being received into the Roman Catholic Church. On 18 September 1936, he followed the same path as Newman and was received into the Catholic Church during a service at Downside Abbey. He then enrolled at Beda College in Rome to study for the Catholic priesthood.

=== Catholic Church ===
On 31 March 1940, Wheeler was ordained as a Roman Catholic priest by Cardinal Hinsley, Archbishop of Westminster, during a service at Westminster Cathedral. He was firstly an assistant priest at St Edmund's Parish in Lower Edmonton from 1940 to 1944, then chaplain at Westminster Cathedral. He often made a point of noting to his clergy that he understood their difficulties from his having heard confessions every day of the 11 years he served at the cathedral. He became chaplain to Catholics at the University of London in 1950. He was appointed a privy chamberlain by Pope Pius XII in 1952, an honorary appointment. He returned to Westminster Cathedral in 1954, having been appointed administrator by Cardinal Bernard Griffin. He was promoted to domestic prelate by Pope Pius XII in 1955.

Wheeler was named by the Holy See to the episcopate as the coadjutor bishop of the Roman Catholic Diocese of Middlesbrough in 1964, immediately after which he participated in the last two sessions of the Second Vatican Council. Wheeler was named Roman Catholic Bishop of Leeds in 1966 and was an enthusiastic supporter of the spirit of the council. One example is that, immediately after his return from Rome, he founded a new ecumenical centre at Wood Hall in Wetherby, Yorkshire. Later, despite his feelings about the historic structure of the diocese, he followed part of its instruction by supervising the division of his diocese in 1980, in keeping with the conciliar mandate that dioceses be of such a size as to be truly manageable under the supervision of one bishop.

Wheeler remained a staunch conservative in matters of liturgical practice. He was the last bishop in England to use the cappa magna and had a strong attachment to the Tridentine Mass. He submitted his resignation as bishop of the diocese at the mandatory age of 75 in 1985. He then entered an active retirement at the College of the Blessed Virgin Mary in Headingley under the care of the Little Sisters of the Poor.

== Death and legacy ==
Wheeler died on 21 February 1998, aged 87, after a brief illness. At his request, he was buried near his predecessor and the bishop who had ordained him in the Catholic Church, Bishop Henry John Poskitt, also a convert from the Church of England, in the Church of St Edward the Confessor in Clifford, West Yorkshire.

A noted author, Wheeler's memoir, In Truth and Love, was published in 1990.

In March 2013, Catholic primary and secondary schools in north west Leeds and Bradford joined together to gain academy status from the government, as a Catholic multi-academy trust. The trust, the second in the Diocese of Leeds, took the name "The Bishop Wheeler Catholic Academy Trust". At first, six schools form the parts of the trust.

Catholic Church titles
Preceded by George Dwyer	Roman Catholic Bishop of Leeds; 1966–1985	Succeeded by David Konstant
