= Diocese of Leeds =

Diocese of Leeds may refer to:

- Anglican Diocese of Leeds
- Roman Catholic Diocese of Leeds
