= Robert Cornthwaite (bishop) =

English prelate

The Right Reverend Robert Cornthwaite
- Bishop of Leeds
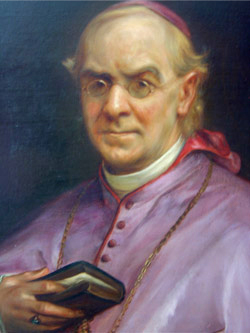
- Diocese: Diocese of Leeds
- Appointed: 20 December 1878
- Term ended: 16 June 1890
- Successor: William Gordon
- Previous post: Bishop of Beverley

Orders
- Ordination: 9 November 1845
- Consecration: 10 November 1861 by Nicholas Wiseman

Personal details
- Born: 9 May 1818 Preston, Lancashire, United Kingdom
- Died: 16 June 1890 (aged 72) Leeds, West Riding of Yorkshire, United Kingdom
- Buried: The Church of Mary Immaculate, Sicklinghall
- Denomination: Roman Catholic
- Parents: William Cornthwaite and Elizabeth Cornthwaite (née Cuerden)
- Education: Ushaw College; English College, Rome

Robert Cornthwaite (9 May 1818 – 16 June 1890) was an English prelate of the Roman Catholic Church. He was last Bishop of Beverley and the first Bishop of Leeds.

== Early life and ministry ==
Robert Cornthwaite was born in Preston, Lancashire, the son of William and Elizabeth (née Cuerden) Cornthwaite. He entered St Cuthbert's College, Ushaw on 9 May 1830, and received the Tonsure and the four minor orders from Bishop Francis George Mostyn on 5 June 1841. During his last year at Ushaw, Cornthwaite taught Humanities.

He entered the English College, Rome on 30 September 1842, and took the oath there on 2 July 1842. He was ordained a subdeacon in December 1843, a deacon on 3 March 1844, and a priest on 9 November 1845. After leaving the English College on 13 April 1846, he joined the mission at Carlisle. He returned to Rome on his appointment as the Rector of the English College, Rome on 25 August 1851, remaining in that post until resigned in September 1857. On his return to England, he became the Missionary Rector of St Augustine's, Darlington and Secretary to William Hogarth, Bishop of Hexham and Newcastle. He was appointed Cameriere d'onore extra Urbem (Honorary Prelate) to His Holiness on 16 July 1858, and made Canon and Theologian of the Chapter of the Diocese of Hexham and Newcastle.

== Episcopal career ==
On 3 September 1861, Cornthwaite was appointed to succeed John Briggs as bishop of the Diocese of Beverley. His consecration to the Episcopate took place on 10 November 1861, the principal consecrator was Cardinal Nicholas Wiseman, Archbishop of Westminster, with Thomas Grant, Bishop of Southwark, and Richard Roskell, Bishop of Nottingham serving as co-consecrators.

In December 1865, Cornthwaite brought the Little Sisters of the Poor to Leeds. The sisters set up their first home in Hanover Square.

The "Great Convent Case" opened on 3 February 1869 at Westminster Hall with press interest. Sister of Mercy Susan Saurin accused her superiors of lying to Cornthwaite in addition to assault and imprisonment. Saurin had previously complained to the Bishop and the enquiry he created was held to be a "parody of justice". The Bishop was reprimanded for not fixing the "miserable squabbles of a convent". Saurin was awarded fifty pounds in damages. The Daily Telegraph made a special publication on the "Inner Life of the Hull Nunnery Exposed" to cover the trial.

On 20 December 1878, the Diocese of Beverley was suppressed and it was replaced by the dioceses of Leeds and Middlesbrough. Cornthwaite continued to serve as the Bishop of Leeds until his death on 16 June 1890, aged 72. He is buried at the Church of Mary Immaculate, Sicklinghall.

== Bibliography ==
- Brady, W. Maziere (1876). The Episcopal Succession in England, Scotland and Ireland, A.D. 1400 to 1875. Vol. 3. Rome, Italy: Tipografia Della Pace.

Catholic Church titles
Preceded by John Briggs	Bishop of Beverley; 1861–1878	Last appointment
New title	Bishop of Leeds; 1878–1890	Succeeded by William Gordon
