= Joseph Cowgill =

English prelate (1860–1936)

The Right Reverend Joseph Cowgill
- Bishop of Leeds
- Church: Roman Catholic
- See: Leeds
- In office: 7 June 1911 – 12 May 1936
- Predecessor: William Gordon
- Successor: Henry Poskitt

Personal details
- Born: 23 February 1860 Broughton, England
- Died: 12 May 1936 Leeds, England

Joseph Robert Cowgill (23 February 1860 – 12 May 1936) was an English prelate of the Roman Catholic Church. He served as the third Bishop of Leeds.

== Life and ministry ==
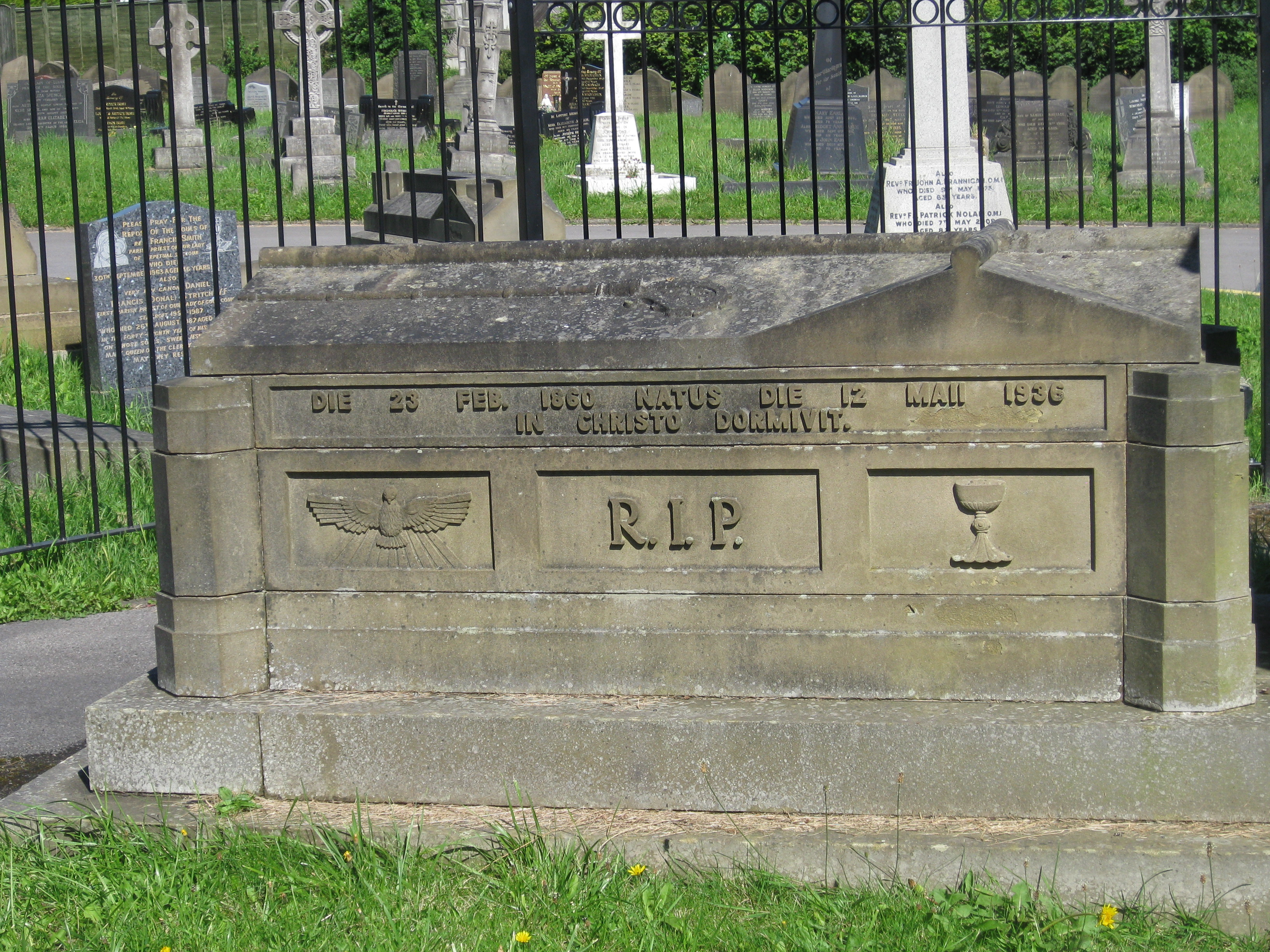
Part of the tomb and memorial at Killingbeck Cemetery, giving the dates of his life

Joseph Cowgill was born in village Broughton in North Yorkshire on 23 February 1860. He was ordained to the priesthood on 19 May 1883 at an age of 23.

He then served as assistant priest in the Diocese of Leeds. On 26 September 1905, Cowgill was appointed as coadjutor Bishop of Leeds and titular Bishop of Olena. He received his episcopal consecration on 30 November 1905 from Thomas Whiteside, Bishop (later Archbishop) of Liverpool, with Francis Mostyn, Bishop of Menevia (later Archbishop of Cardiff) and Samuel Webster Allen, Bishop of Shrewsbury serving as co-consecrators.

Cowgill became the third Bishop of Leeds, when he succeeded William Gordon who died in office on 7 June 1911.

Joseph Cowgill was known as Children's Bishop, and he celebrated the requiem mass for Mother Mary Loyola, who was an internationally bestselling writer with many books for children. He was the one to set up (in 1911) the Diocesan Rescue and Protection Society to develop a more systematic approach to addressing the needs of poverty and disadvantage in the Diocese. An annual collection in all missions and the annual Good Shepherd collection in schools was established that year to fund the new initiative. So Catholic Care was established.

He died on 12 May 1936 and was buried at the Killingbeck Cemetery in Leeds.

Catholic Church titles
Preceded by William Gordon	Bishop of Leeds; 1911–1936	Succeeded by Henry John Poskitt
