= William Gordon (bishop of Leeds) =

19th and 20th-century English Catholic bishop

The Right Reverend William Gordon
- Bishop of Leeds
- Church: Roman Catholic Church
- See: Leeds
- In office: 16 June 1890 – 7 June 1911
- Predecessor: Robert Cornthwaite
- Successor: Joseph Cowgill

Personal details
- Born: 24 September 1831 Thirsk, North Riding of Yorkshire, England
- Died: 7 June 1911 (aged 79) Leeds, England

William Gordon (24 September 1831 – 7 June 1911) was an English prelate of the Roman Catholic Church. He was the second Bishop of Leeds.

== Life and ministry ==
William Gordon was born in the village of Thirsk in the North Riding of Yorkshire. He was ordained to the priesthood by John Briggs, Bishop of Beverley, on 10 February 1859.

Gordon then served as an assistant priest in the Diocese of Leeds. On 28 December 1889, Gordon was appointed as coadjutor Bishop of Leeds and titular Bishop of Arcadiopolis in Asia. He received his episcopal consecration on 24 February 1890, from Bernard O'Reilly, Bishop of Liverpool, with Richard Lacy, Bishop of Middlesbrough, and Thomas William Wilkinson, Bishop of Hexham and Newcastle, serving as co-consecrators.

On 16 June 1890, Gordon was appointed to be the 2nd Bishop of Leeds, where he succeeded Robert Cornthwaite who had died in office.

Rt Rev William Gordon, Bishop of Leeds established Killingback Cemetery as a Leeds Catholic Cemetery in 1895.

== Death ==
Gordon served as a bishop for more than 20 years and died on 7 June 1911, aged 79.

Preceded by Robert Cornthwaite	Bishop of Leeds; 1890–1911	Succeeded by Joseph Cowgill
