= Susan Saurin =

British Catholic nun (1829–1915)

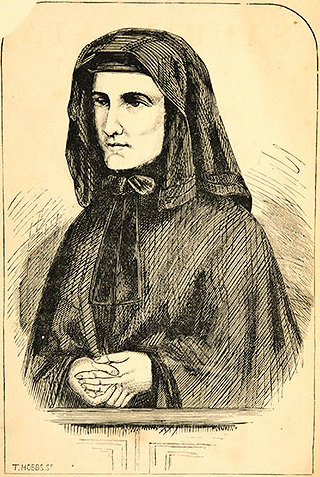
- In 1869 during court proceedings
- Born: Susanna Mary Saurin; 21 September 1829; Duleek, County Meath, United Kingdom of Great Britain and Ireland
- Died: 10 February 1915 (aged 85); Harrow on the Hill, England, United Kingdom of Great Britain and Ireland
- Other names: Mary Brown; Mary Scholastica
- Occupation: Roman Catholic nun
- Employer: Sisters of Mercy
- Known for: Cause célèbre

Susan Saurin (née Susanna Mary Saurin, alias Mary Brown, religious name Mary Scholastica; 21 September 1829 – 10 February 1915) was a British Roman Catholic nun. She was the subject of the "Great Convent Case" which found that she had been mistreated by her convent and that the church had failed to give her justice. The case was a cause célèbre in an anti-Catholic Victorian society.

== Life ==
Saurin was born in Duleek. Her parents were Brigid and Michael Saurin, landowners in Duleek, County Meath, Ireland. Four of Brigid and Michael's children opted for a religious life. A fifth child, Patrick, opted to become a lawyer. After two of her sisters decided to become nuns, her parents wanted Susan to choose a different life, but she insisted.

In November 1850 Saurin made her commitment by joining a convent in Dublin where she was trained with Mary Starr and Julia Kennedy. The three of them adopted the names of Sister Scholastica, Sister Joseph and Sister Magdelen. Saurin's vows were accepted on 3 October 1853 and in 1856 the three of them were sent to found a new convent in Clifford in Yorkshire. Mary Starr (Joseph) was placed in charge with Julia Kennedy (Magdelen) as her assistant. In time the new convent would move to Hull.

Mother Mary Starr (Joseph) and Saurin came into conflict. Starr was unhappy with many of the tasks that Saurin undertook and she accused her of breaking her vow of obedience because she would not tell her of conversations she had in the confessional or of letters that she had written including a letter asking her uncle to try and arrange her transfer to another convent. Starr was annoyed and turned to the Bishop to ask that he have Saurin evicted from the convent or she would resign. The Bishop had an obligation to oversee the convent. The Bishop of Beverley, Robert Cornthwaite had conflicting requests from Starr and Saurin's family who wanted him look at Saurin's treatment within the convent. Cornthwaite appointed five priests to investigate. They found "extraordinary and unexemplary severity" but only interviewed one of the nuns, Saurin. Individually the priests had doubts but their agreed advice was that Saurin should be obliged to leave the convent. Saurin refused and she believed that the Bishop lacked the power to intervene in her vows given at the convent.

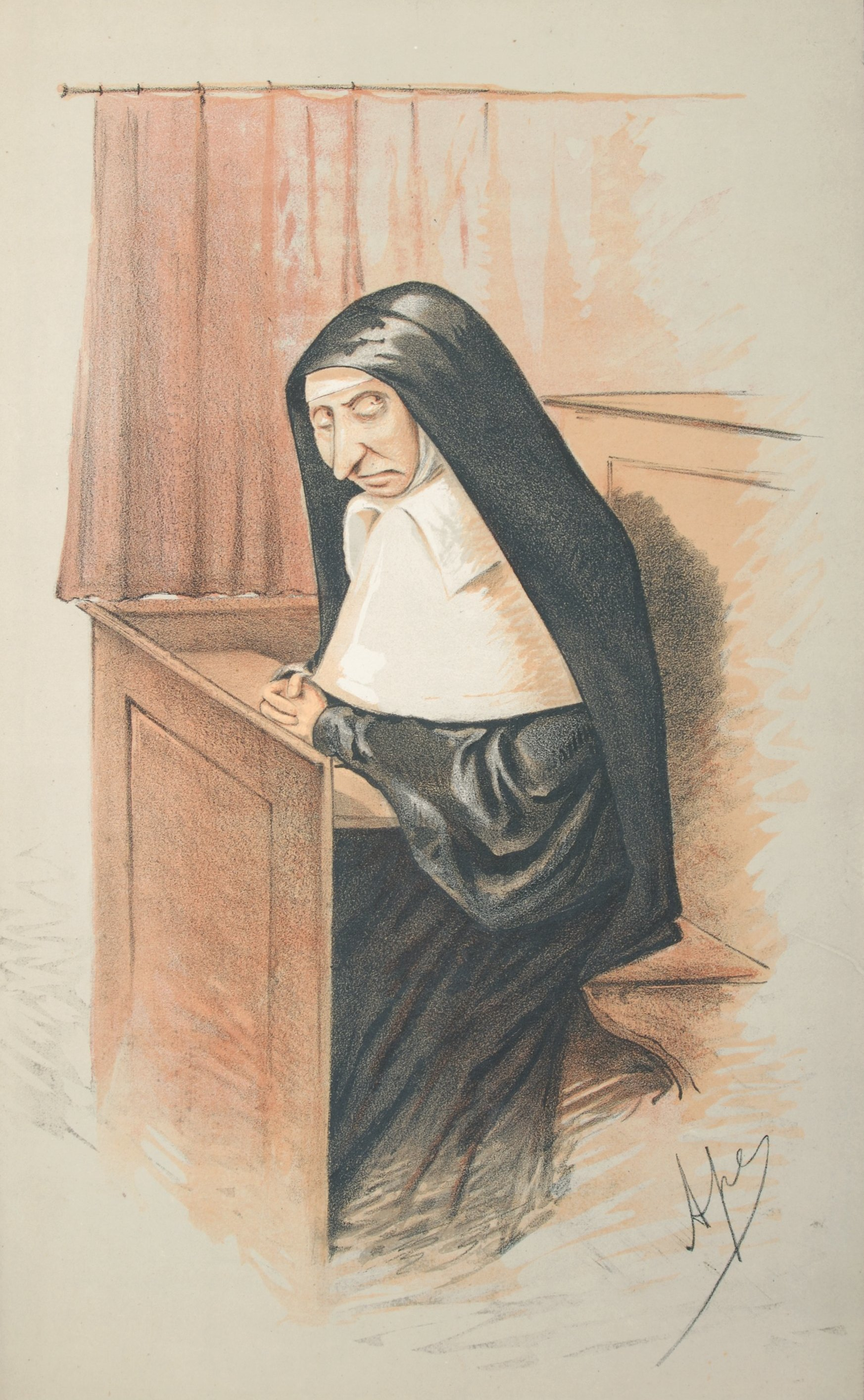
A caricature of Mother Starr in 1869 during the Great Convent Case

For over a year she lived in the convent but was not part of the community. During this time a nun slept outside her room and she had was denied a fire or any books. Her treatment was leading to starvation and under medical advice and the legal advice of her brother (Patrick) she left the convent without ceremony or discussion with Starr or Kennedy. Nuns who leave convents can find that they lose all of their social standing.

== Court case ==
The "Great Convent Case" opened on 3 February 1869 at Westminster Hall with the Solicitor General William Digby Seymour representing Saurin and Queen's counsel representing Starr and Kennedy. Saurin was claiming £5,000 in damages. Starr's portrait was caricatured by "Ape" and accompanied the story in Vanity Fair. Saurin accused Starr and Kennedy of lying to the Bishop of Beverley, assault and imprisonment. and the court heard of the Bishops enquiry which was held to be a "parody of justice". The Bishop was reprimanded for not fixing the “miserable squabbles of a convent” and Starr was found to have misused Saurin's vow of obedience to inflict cruelty on her. Saurin was awarded fifty pounds in damages. The Daily Telegraph made a special publication on the "Inner Life of the Hull Nunnery Exposed" to cover the trial.

Saurin died in Harrow on the Hill. She died as a nun as she had adopted the name of Mary Brown and joined a convent in Bristol.

The case was a cause célèbre in a Victorian society divided by different Christian perspectives and an abundance of anti-Catholic sentiment. Charles Newdigate Newdegate's "campaign for the regulation of Catholic convents and monasteries shows that his anti-Catholicism was widely shared in and out of Parliament in the early 1870s."
