= George Dwyer =

English prelate

The Most Reverend George Dwyer
- Archbishop emeritus of Birmingham
- Church: Latin Church
- Archdiocese: Birmingham
- See: Birmingham
- Appointed: 5 October 1965
- Installed: 5 October 1965
- Term ended: 1 September 1981
- Predecessor: Francis Grimshaw
- Successor: Maurice Couve de Murville
- Other post: Bishop of Leeds (1957–1965)

Orders
- Ordination: 1 November 1932
- Consecration: 24 September 1957 by John Carmel Heenan

Personal details
- Born: 25 September 1908 Manchester, England
- Died: 17 September 1987 (aged 78) Birmingham, England
- Buried: St Mary's College, Oscott
- Denomination: Catholic
- Education: English College, Rome; Christ's College, Cambridge; Pontifical Gregorian University
- Motto: Spe Gaudentes (Rejoicing in Hope)

Styles of George Patrick Dwyer
- Reference style: The Most Reverend
- Spoken style: Your Grace
- Religious style: Archbishop

Ordination history of George Dwyer
History
Priestly ordination
- Date: 1 November 1932
Episcopal consecration
- Principal consecrator: John Carmel Heenan (Liverpool)
- Co-consecrators: George Beck (Salford); Cyril Restieaux (Plymouth)
- Date: 24 September 1957
Episcopal succession
Bishops consecrated by George Dwyer as principal consecrator
- Anthony Emery: 4 March 1968
- Patrick Leo McCartie: 20 May 1977

George Patrick Dwyer (25 September 1908 – 17 September 1987) was an English prelate and the Archbishop Emeritus of the Roman Catholic Archdiocese of Birmingham, England. Dwyer served as the sixth Archbishop of Birmingham from 1965 to 1981, succeeding Francis Grimshaw. Before that, Dwyer had served as the sixth Roman Catholic Bishop of Leeds, between 1957 and 1965, being succeeded by William Wheeler.

== Early life and ministry ==
The son of John William Dwyer, a wholesale egg and potato merchant, and his wife Jemima, he was also a cousin by marriage of Anthony Burgess, he was educated at St Bede's College, Manchester (1919–1926), then at the Venerable English College, Rome after being accepted by the Salford Diocese as a candidate for the priesthood. Dwyer proved an outstanding student, and was awarded doctorates in philosophy and theology from the Pontifical Gregorian University. He was ordained priest for the Roman Catholic Diocese of Leeds on 1 November 1932, and returned to England to study languages at Christ's College, Cambridge.

Following postgraduate studies in Rome and Cambridge from 1932 to 1937, he returned to St Bede's as a member of the teaching staff before joining the Catholic Missionary Society as vice-superior in 1947. He also edited the Catholic Gazette for four years until his appointment as Superior of the Catholic Missionary Society in 1951.

== Episcopal career ==
He was ordained bishop on 24 September 1957 by John Carmel Heenan (then the Archbishop of Liverpool) following his appointment as Bishop of Leeds where he succeeded Heenan who had previously served a term of eight years in Leeds. During his time in this diocese, Dwyer served as a Council Father for the first three sessions of the Second Vatican Council.

In October 1965, Dwyer was translated to the Roman Catholic Archdiocese of Birmingham to serve as the sixth Archbishop of Birmingham, named by Pope Paul VI. In his new role he also took part in the fourth session of the Second Vatican Council.

After the death of John Carmel Heenan (who was Dwyer's close friend) in 1975, Dwyer was seen by some as a natural successor as Archbishop of Westminster. However, Dwyer informed the Apostolic Delegate he felt that at sixty-seven his age was too great for him to be considered for the post. He was, however, elected president of the Bishops' Conference during the first three years of Basil Hume's episcopate, becoming the first bishop to hold that position who was not also Archbishop of Westminster.

His coat of arms is blazoned, 'Argent on a saltire Gules a jousting spear Or' thus incorporating the names of St Patrick and St George. His motto was Spe Gaudentes ("Rejoicing in Hope").

== Later life and death ==
Dwyer retired as Archbishop of Birmingham, his resignation was accepted by Pope John Paul II on 1 September 1981, taking up the title Archbishop Emeritus of Birmingham.

Dwyer died on 17 September 1987 at the age of 78. He was subsequently buried at St Mary's College, Oscott on 24 September 1987.

Catholic Church titles
Preceded by John Carmel Heenan	Bishop of Leeds; 1957–1965	Succeeded by Gordon Wheeler
Preceded by Francis Joseph Grimshaw	Archbishop of Birmingham; 1965–1981	Succeeded by Maurice Noël Léon Couve de Murville
