= Marcus Stock =

Bishop of Leeds (born 1961)

The Right Reverend Marcus Stock
- Bishop of Leeds
- Church: Catholic Church
- Province: Liverpool
- Diocese: Leeds
- See: Leeds
- Appointed: 15 September 2014
- Installed: 13 November 2014
- Predecessor: Arthur Roche
- Previous posts: General Secretary, Catholic Bishops' Conference of England and Wales (2009–2014); Acting Director, Catholic Education Service (2011–2013); Director of Schools, Archdiocese of Birmingham (1999–2009); Acting Director of Schools, Archdiocese of Birmingham (1995–1999); Religious Education Teacher, European School, Culham (1991–1994); Tutor in Theology, Archdiocese of Birmingham Permanent Diaconate Formation Program (1989–1994)

Orders
- Ordination: 13 August 1988 by Basil Hume
- Consecration: 13 November 2014 by Vincent Nichols

Personal details
- Born: Marcus Nigel Ralph Stock; 27 August 1961 (age 65) London, England
- Denomination: Roman Catholic
- Education: Keble College, Oxford; English College, Rome; Pontifical Gregorian University
- Motto: Desiderio, desideravi (I have desired with desire to be with you Luke, 22:15)
- Coat of arms: Marcus Stock's coat of arms

Styles of Marcus Stock
- Reference style: The Right Reverend
- Spoken style: My lord
- Religious style: Bishop

Ordination history of Marcus Stock
History
Diaconal ordination
- Ordained by: Basil Hume (Westminster)
Priestly ordination
- Ordained by: Maurice Couve de Murville (Birmingham)
Episcopal consecration
- Principal consecrator: Vincent Nichols (Westminster)
- Co-consecrators: Bernard Longley (Birmingham); Arthur Roche (Leeds emeritus)

Marcus Stock (born 27 August 1961) is an English bishop of the Catholic Church who has been the tenth Bishop of Leeds since 2014. In 2025 he was appointed apostolic administrator to the Diocese of Middlesbrough, and in 2026 apostolic administrator to the Diocese of Hallam, both in addition to his role in Leeds.

== Early life ==
Marcus Nigel Ralph Stock was born on 27 August 1961 in London, England. He attended Oxford University, studying theology at Keble College. He entered training for the priesthood at the Venerable English College and was awarded a Licence in Dogmatic Theology by the Pontifical Gregorian University. He was ordained a Deacon whilst in Rome by Cardinal Basil Hume, the then Archbishop of Westminster.

== Priestly ministry ==
Marcus Stock was ordained a priest in 1988 by Maurice Couve de Murville, Archbishop of Birmingham, and served in parishes across the Archdiocese of Birmingham, including Bloxwich and Coleshill, being appointed parish priest of the latter in 2000. Between 1991 and 1994, Stock was a teacher of Religious Education at the European School, Culham. He was appointed assistant director before being promoted to Director of the Archdiocesan Schools Commission between 1999 and 2009, before being appointed General Secretary of the Catholic Bishops' Conference of England and Wales in the same year by Vincent Nichols, Archbishop of Westminster. He led the Bishops' Conference during the Papal Visit to the UK in 2010 by Pope Benedict XVI and was in interim charge of the Catholic Education Service after the resignation of Oona Stannard. Shortly before his appointment as Bishop of Leeds it was announced that he would be succeeded at the Bishops' Conference by Christopher Thomas from the Diocese of Nottingham at the conclusion of his five-year term. In 2012, Marcus Stock was appointed Prelate of Honour by Pope Benedict XVI.

== Episcopal career ==
Pope Francis appointed Stock to the See of Leeds on 15 September 2014. He chose the episcopal motto Desiderio, desideravi (Luke 22:15) which translates as I have desired with desire to be with you or I have eagerly desired, referring to Jesus' fervent desire to celebrate the Passover with his disciples before his death. Stock attended Solemn Vespers on the eve of his consecration as bishop, where his episcopal insignia (ring, mitre and crozier) were blessed by John Wilson, the Diocesan Administrator (Vicar Capitular) for the Diocese of Leeds. His crozier was given as a gift from Stock's previous diocese, the Archdiocese of Birmingham.

On 13 November 2014, Stock was consecrated the tenth Bishop of Leeds by Vincent Cardinal Nichols, along with the co-consecrators Bernard Longley, Archbishop of Birmingham (from the diocese Stock had previously ministered in) and Archbishop Arthur Roche, Apostolic Administrator and Bishop emeritus of Leeds (whom Stock succeeded).

Stock issued a pastoral letter on 25 September 2016 on Sacramental Preparation for First Holy Communion and Confirmation and the Provision of Youth Services, changing the age at which the sacrament of Confirmation is generally conferred on young people from the age of 14 to 11, with consequential changes to the ages at which young people generally first receive the sacraments of reconciliation and holy communion.

In December 2025 he was appointed as the apostolic administrator to the Diocese of Middlesbrough, following the retirement of Bishop Terry Drainey. He has taken on this role in addition to his current role in Leeds, and mentioned in his letter to the diocese that Pope Leo XIV wanted them to consider how both dioceses might "journey together", noting that before 1878 they both used to be part of the Diocese of Beverley.

In March 2026, following the resignation of Bishop Ralph Heskett, Stock was appointed as the Apostolic Administrator of the Diocese of Hallam. He confirmed had been tasked with beginning "a consultation with the clergy, religious and lay faithful of the Diocese of Hallam about a possible reunification with the Diocese of Leeds".

Catholic Church titles
Preceded by Arthur Roche	Bishop of Leeds; 2014–present	Incumbent
