= Victoria O'Keefe =

British actress (1969–1990)

- Born: 27 March 1969; Dewsbury, West Riding of Yorkshire, England, UK
- Died: 17 April 1990 (aged 21); Lancashire, England, UK
- Occupation: Actress
- Years active: 1983–1990

Victoria O'Keefe (27 March 1969 – 17 April 1990) was an English actress.

== Early life ==
O'Keefe attended St Joseph’s Catholic Primary School in Dewsbury, and the St John Fisher Catholic High School, Dewsbury. O'Keefe joined the Dewsbury Arts Group when she was 11. She attended the Batley School of Art, part of Dewsbury college, now Kirklees College.

== Acting roles ==
Her first role was in the 1983 television series Nanny, playing Nicola Brooke. She played Letty Boot in the 1984 miniseries Letty.

She is best known for her role as Jane in the 1984 BBC docudrama Threads.

In 1987, she played Christine, in the youth show Y.E.S., in the episode named Hook, Line and Sinker.

In 1987, she played Sally Newman, in four episodes of Emmerdale Farm.

In 1988, she played in the UK soap opera, Hollywood Sports.

In 1988, she played Anne Bamforth, in the TV movie, The Luddites, about the revolt of 18th century textile workers.

In 1990, she played Tracey in the TV series He-Play, in the episode named Positively Negative.

=== Stage ===
In 1989, O'Keefe played Sybyl Burlington, in Dewsbury Arts Group's production of Daisy Pulls It Off, about life in a 1920s girls' English boarding school.

In October 1989, she played Ann Deever, in the Arthur Miller play All My Sons, with the Dewsbury Arts Group.

In November 1989, she played the Beauty, in Beauty and the Beast, with the Dewsbury Arts Group.

== Death ==
O'Keefe died on 17 April 1990 in a car accident near Bold, St Helens, Lancashire on the M62 motorway. Three others died in the crash, her two young friends, and their baby. O'Keefe's boyfriend was driving at the time, in rainy conditions, on a contraflow lane system. Their car crossed into the west-bound lane, into the path of a lorry.
