= Hanover Square, Leeds =

Square in Leeds, England

Coordinates: 53°48′06″N 1°33′35″W

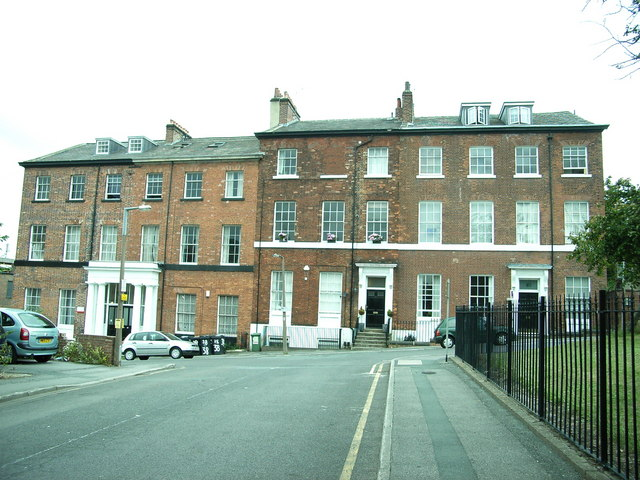
Buildings on the south west edge of Hanover Square, Leeds.

Hanover Square is a large Georgian public square and gardens in Leeds, West Yorkshire, United Kingdom.

It is situated near to the Leeds General Infirmary, the University of Leeds and Burley Road.

Numbers 11, 37, 38, 39 and 40 are Grade II listed buildings, and Denison Hall, also located on the square, is Grade II* listed.
