= Betagbarar =

Titular Roman Catholic see

The diocese of Betagbarar (Latin: Dioecesis Betagbarensis) is a suppressed and now titular see of the Roman Catholic Church.

The diocese was originally founded in a Roman town of the Roman province of Numidia in the north of modern Algeria. Only one bishop is known of this place. The Donatist Januarius was episcopus Betagbaritanus at the Council of Carthage in 411 to debate the Donatist schism, at which he declared that he had no Catholic competitor in his diocese.

Today Betagbarar survives as a titular bishopric and the current bishop is Martin Gächter, former auxiliary bishop of Basel.
