= Maurice Couve de Murville (bishop) =

Catholic archbishop

The Most Reverend Maurice Noël Léon Couve de Murville
- Archbishop of Birmingham
- Archdiocese: Birmingham
- See: Birmingham
- Appointed: 22 January 1982
- Installed: 25 March 1982
- Term ended: 12 June 1999
- Predecessor: George Patrick Dwyer
- Successor: Vincent Gerard Nichols

Orders
- Ordination: 29 June 1957 by Cyril Cowderoy
- Consecration: 25 March 1982 by Bruno Heim

Personal details
- Born: 27 June 1929 St Germain-en-Laye, France
- Died: 3 November 2007 (aged 78) Littlehampton, West Sussex
- Denomination: Roman Catholic
- Motto: Ales diei nuntius (The Winged Herald of the Day)

Styles of Maurice Noël Léon Couve de Murville
- Reference style: The Most Reverend
- Spoken style: Your Grace
- Religious style: Archbishop

Maurice Noël Léon Couve de Murville (27 June 1929 – 3 November 2007) was a French-born British Roman Catholic bishop. He was the seventh Archbishop of Birmingham from 25 March 1982 until his retirement on 12 June 1999, having formerly been a priest of the Diocese of Arundel and Brighton and chaplain of Fisher House, Cambridge.

== Early career and priesthood ==
Maurice Couve de Murville was born in Saint-Germain-en-Laye, west of Paris, into a distinguished French family who moved to Mauritius at the end of the 18th century. He was a cousin and namesake of Maurice Couve de Murville (1907–1999), a French politician in the Huguenot branch of the family, who served as foreign minister (1958–1968) and, briefly, the Prime Minister of France under General Charles de Gaulle. In 1936, his father took him from France, along with his mother and twin brothers, to England and settled at Leatherhead in Surrey, at the age of 7. His mother died in 1945 in England. She was buried alongside other Souchon family members in Effingham, Surrey.

Educated initially at The John Fisher School, Purley, then by the Benedictines at Downside School near Bath, he read history at Trinity College, Cambridge (MA). He studied at the seminary of Saint-Sulpice, and earned his Licentiate of Sacred Theology (STL) degree from the Institut Catholique in Paris. He was influenced by the worker-priest movement in France, and became lifelong friends with Jean-Marie Lustiger, future Cardinal Archbishop of Paris.

He was ordained a priest on the Feast of Ss Peter and Paul on 29 June 1957, for the Diocese of Southwark, by Bishop Cowderoy. His first appointment was as curate at St Anselm's, Dartford (1957–1960), and as curate at St Joseph's, Brighton (1960–1961). He later served as priest-in-charge at St Francis, Moulsecoomb (1961–1964). In 1961, he was also appointed as chaplain at the University of Sussex. He established a Catholic chaplaincy in Brighton in 1964, called Howard House.

He received an MPhil degree in Assyro-Babylonian studies from the School of Oriental and African Studies, University of London, in 1975, and in 1977 was posted to Cambridge upon being appointed chaplain at the University of Cambridge, based at Fisher House. He remained in Cambridge until it was announced that he had been appointed by the Holy See on 22 January 1982 to succeed Archbishop George Patrick Dwyer as Archbishop of Birmingham, the third most senior post in the Catholic Church in England and Wales. He was consecrated and installed as archbishop at St Chad's Cathedral on the Feast of the Annunciation, 25 March 1982. The principal consecrator was the Apostolic Nuncio, Archbishop Bruno Heim, assisted by Archbishop Jean-Marie Lustiger of Paris and Bishop Basil Christopher Butler OSB. His episcopal motto was Ales diei nuntius.

== Archbishop of Birmingham, 1982–99 ==
One of his first duties was to welcome Pope John Paul II at Coventry Airport on Pentecost Sunday, 30 May 1982, the third day of the Pope's pastoral visit to Great Britain, and participate in the open-air Pontifical Mass which followed. The red silk chasuble worn by the Pope on that occasion has been retained by the Archdiocese of Birmingham and is worn by the archbishop on suitable grand occasions.

He was particularly involved in developing religious education of the laity in his archdiocese, and helped to establish the Maryvale Institute near Birmingham as an international Catholic college for theology, religious education and catechesis. Cardinal Newman established the English Congregation of the Oratory at Maryvale on 1 February 1848. With validation from the pontifical university Maynooth College in Ireland and The Open University, it now offers undergraduate, postgraduate and research degree programmes.

He was chairman of the governing body of the Newman College of Higher Education (now Newman University) in Birmingham. In 2007, it was announced that Newman College would become a university college and obtain degree-awarding powers. He fostered ties between Oscott and the Catholic University of Louvain, and established links with the University of Birmingham.

Couve de Murville was a member of the Friends of Cardinal Newman and supported the Fathers of the Birmingham Oratory in the cause for the beatification and canonisation of Newman, their founder.

In 1992, he visited California and became interested in Blessed Junipero Serra, founder of the California Missions. He wrote a book on his life, The Man Who Founded California, a pastoral approach to this recently canonised friar.

The last years of his episcopate were tarnished by a series of paedophile scandals involving priests in his archdiocese including, in particular, Samuel Penney and Eric Taylor. In 1999, following a prostate operation, he submitted his resignation to the Pope, who permitted him to retire five years early, on health grounds.

In November 1994, he was awarded an honorary degree from The Open University as a Doctor of the University.

== Later life ==
In retirement, he returned to Sussex and lived in Horsham. He was an enthusiastic principal chaplain of the British Association of the Sovereign Military Order of Malta (1987–1991, 2001–2007) and knighted by the Duke of Castro in 1994 as Ecclesiastical Knight Grand Cross of Grace in the Sacred Military Constantinian Order of Saint George. He became an honorary Doctor of Divinity at the University of Birmingham in 1996.

He presided at Mass at St Chad's Cathedral for the last time on 26 March 2007, on the 25th anniversary of his episcopal ordination, concelebrating with his auxiliaries, Bishops Philip Pargeter, David McGough and William Kenney.

He had a number of publications to his credit. A few months before his death, he finished a translation of Jean Charbonnier's comprehensive history of the Catholic Church in China. He had battled prostate cancer several years before. His first signs of slowing down came with a hip replacement in November 2006. However, he remained active with his much loved pursuits of walking and gardening. In October 2007, before embarking on a planned pilgrimage to the Holy Land, he was admitted to hospital and was diagnosed with pancreatic cancer, which was recognised as terminal.

On 3 November 2007, aged 78, he died a peaceful death at St Joseph's Nursing Home in Littlehampton, West Sussex. A Funeral Mass was held at St Chad's Cathedral in Birmingham on 21 November 2007. His coat of arms, displayed on the 1993 organ case in the cathedral, comprises three cockerels, which is a brood or couve in French.

Catholic Church titles
Preceded by George Patrick Dwyer	Archbishop of Birmingham; 1982–1999	Succeeded by Vincent Gerard Nichols
