= Leeds Symphony Orchestra =

Symphony orchestra in the United Kingdom

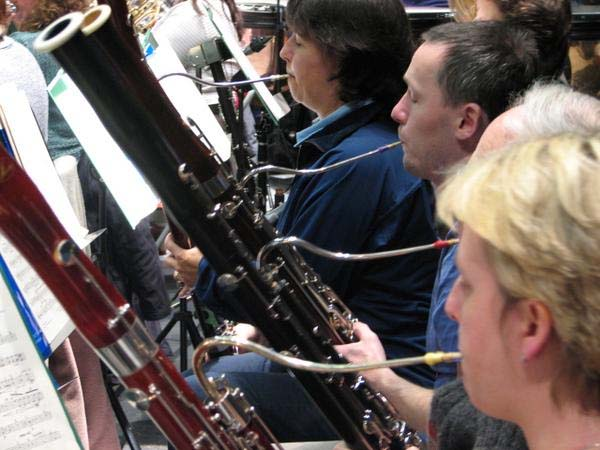
Guitar Concerto rehearsal

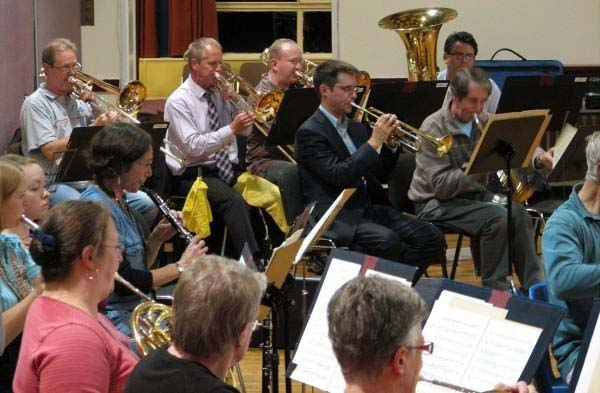
Guitar Concerto rehearsal

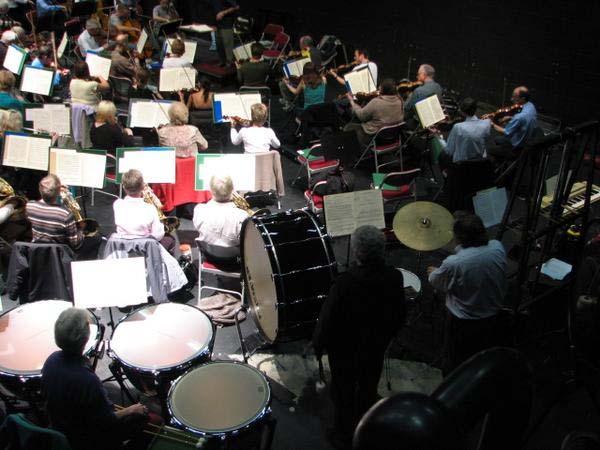
Guitar Concerto rehearsal

Leeds Symphony Orchestra is one of the oldest established symphony orchestras in the United Kingdom dating back to 1890. It is a non-professional orchestra based in Leeds, Yorkshire, with a membership of around 80 players. Up to ten concerts a year are given at venues including Leeds, Knaresborough, Wetherby and Horsforth. The orchestra's repertoire in recent years has ranged from seventeenth-century music to present-day works.

== Conductor ==
Martin Binks was the orchestra's conductor for 49 years from September 1970 to December 2019, making him one of the longest-serving conductors in the UK. He introduced a notable quantity of French music into the orchestra's repertoire, for which the French government appointed him Chevalier de l'Ordre des Arts et des Lettres in 1993. He was also appointed MBE in 2014 for services to music in Yorkshire. Since 2020, the orchestra's conductor has been John Lyon.

== President ==
Classical guitarist Craig Ogden is the orchestra's honorary president, having appeared with the orchestra on many previous occasions. His association with the orchestra includes the first performance, in November 2000, of Arthur Butterworth's Guitar Concerto, a work commissioned by the orchestra.

== Notable soloists ==
- John McCabe (composer), piano
- Marat Bisengaliev, violin
- Craig Ogden, guitar
