= Henry Poskitt =

20th-century English Catholic bishop

The Right Reverend Henry Poskitt
- Bishop of Leeds
- Church: Roman Catholic Church
- See: Leeds
- Installed: 21 September 1936
- Term ended: 19 February 1950
- Predecessor: Joseph Robert Cowgill
- Successor: John Carmel Heenan

Orders
- Ordination: 15 July 1917 by Bishop Joseph Robert Cowgill
- Consecration: 21 September 1936 by Archbishop Richard Downey

Personal details
- Born: 6 September 1888 Birkin, West Riding of Yorkshire, England, United Kingdom of Great Britain and Ireland
- Died: 19 February 1950 Leeds, West Riding of Yorkshire, England, United Kingdom
- Buried: St. Edward King and Confessor Church, Clifford, West Yorkshire, England, United Kingdom

Henry John Poskitt (6 September 1888 – 19 February 1950) was an English prelate of the Roman Catholic Church. He was the fourth Bishop of Leeds.

== Life and ministry ==
Poskitt was born in the village of Birkin in the West Riding of Yorkshire (now North Yorkshire). Raised in the Church of England, he converted to the Catholic Church.

Poskitt was ordained to the Catholic priesthood on 15 July 1917 by Joseph Cowgill, then Bishop of Leeds, at the age of 28.

Poskitt then served as a curate in parishes of the diocese. On 19 August 1936, he was appointed by the Holy See as the 4th Bishop of Leeds, succeeding Cowgill. He received his episcopal consecration on 21 September from Richard Downey, Archbishop of Liverpool, with Joseph Thorman, Bishop of Hexham and Newcastle, and John Francis McNulty, Bishop of Nottingham, serving as co-consecrators.

Poskitt died 19 February 1950 and was buried at St. Edward the Confessor Church in Clifford, West Yorkshire.

Preceded by Joseph Cowgill	Bishop of Leeds; 1936–1950	Succeeded by John Heenan
