= Arthur Hinsley =

Catholic cardinal

His Eminence Arthur Hinsley
- Cardinal, Archbishop of Westminster
- Cardinal Hinsley on 30 April 1935.
- Archdiocese: Westminster
- Appointed: 1 April 1935
- Installed: 29 April 1935
- Term ended: 17 March 1943
- Predecessor: Francis Bourne
- Successor: Bernard Griffin
- Other post: Cardinal-Priest of Santa Susanna
- Previous posts: Titular Bishop of Sebastopolis in Armenia (1926–1930); Titular Archbishop of Sardes (1930–1935); Apostolic Delegate to Africa (1930–1934)

Orders
- Ordination: 23 December 1893
- Consecration: 30 November 1926 by Rafael Merry del Val y Zulueta
- Created cardinal: 13 December 1937 by Pius XI
- Rank: Cardinal-Priest

Personal details
- Born: Arthur Hinsley; 25 August 1865 Carlton, Yorkshire, England
- Died: 17 March 1943 (aged 77) Hare Street House, Hertfordshire, England
- Buried: Westminster Cathedral
- Denomination: Roman Catholic
- Parents: Thomas and Bridget (née Ryan) Hinsley
- Coat of arms

Arthur Cardinal Hinsley (25 August 1865 – 17 March 1943) was a senior-ranking English prelate of the Catholic Church. He served as Archbishop of Westminster from 1935 until his death and was made a cardinal in 1937.

== Early life and ministry ==
Hinsley was born in Carlton near Selby, to Thomas and Bridget (née Ryan) Hinsley. His father was a carpenter and his mother was an Irish Catholic. He studied at Ushaw College in Durham and then proceeded to theological studies at the English College in Rome. Hinsley's education was sponsored by his parish priest, who was also one of the 15th Duke of Norfolk's chaplains at Carlton Towers.

Ordained to the priesthood on 23 December 1893 and was immediately appointed to teach at Ushaw College, a position he held until 1897. He then took up pastoral ministry in Leeds and served as headmaster of St. Bede's Grammar School (which he also founded) from 1900 to 1904. In 1917, after another period of pastoral work, Hinsley became a domestic prelate of his holiness (14 November) and the rector of the English College in Rome, a post in which he remained until 1928.

== Episcopate ==
On 10 August 1926, the then Monsignor Hinsley was appointed titular bishop of Sebastopolis in Armenia by Pope Pius XI. Hinsley received his episcopal consecration on the following 30 November from Rafael Cardinal Merry del Val, with Archbishop Giuseppe Palica and Bishop Peter Amigo serving as co-consecrators, in the chapel of the English College. He was later named apostolic visitor to British Africa on 10 December 1927. While in Africa, Bishop Hinsley suffered a bout of paratyphoid fever.

At the age of 65, he tried with other clerics to climb Mount Etna in South Italy. They had to turn back when one of the party, Francis Cardinal Carberri, had respiratory problems halfway up the mountain. Hinsley always said even on his deathbed that he regretted not climbing Etna.

Pius XI, on 9 January 1930, made Hinsley titular archbishop of Sardis and apostolic delegate to the British missions in Africa that were not under the jurisdiction of the apostolic delegations of Egypt, the Belgian Congo, and South Africa.

Archbishop Hinsley, as he now was, retired as apostolic delegate due to ill health on 25 March 1934 and, in recognition of his long service on behalf of the Holy See, was appointed a canon of St. Peter's Basilica. From this semi-retired position, Hinsley was surprisingly nominated as Archbishop of Westminster on 1 April 1935, thus becoming the spiritual leader of the Catholic Church in England and Wales.

== Cardinalate ==
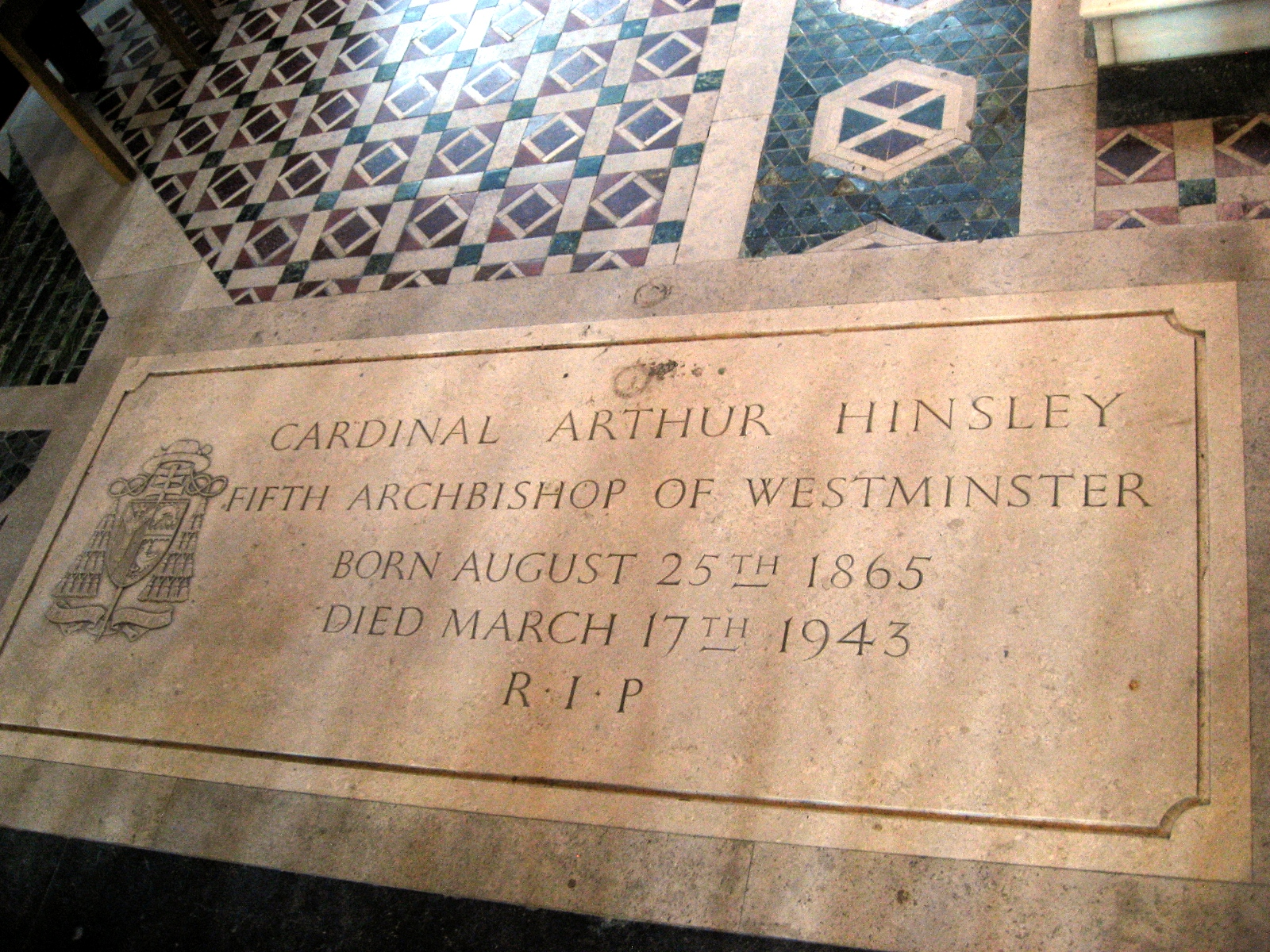
Tomb of Arthur Cardinal Hinsley in Westminster Cathedral

He was created Cardinal-Priest of S. Susanna by Pope Pius XI in the consistory of 13 December 1937. In his capacity of cardinal, Hinsley served as one of the electors in the 1939 papal conclave, which selected Pope Pius XII. A supporter of ecumenism, Hinsley founded the multi-denominational Sword of the Spirit in October 1940 to rally his fellow English clergymen (including non-Catholics) against totalitarianism. He defended Alfred Noyes in his argument with the Vatican. The English prelate, as well as the episcopal hierarchy and the main Catholic press, actively supported Francisco Franco during the Spanish Civil War; Hinsley, who all his life kept a picture of dictator Franco on his desk, "wrote letters, spoke to church bodies, facilitated fund-raising and maintained a constant and vigilant eye promoting Franco's side".

It has been claimed his support for Winston Churchill was important to the prime minister in 1940 and helped improve relations between the Church and the British establishment.

Catholic schools at that time educated 8% of children in England and Wales. The president of the Board of Education, Rab Butler, was drawing up plans for what would eventually become the Education Act 1944, and was keen to draw Church schools into the state system in return for financial support. Although he was able to negotiate deals with the Church of England and the Nonconformist churches, Butler was told that his plans were not acceptable to the Roman Catholic Church (15 September 1942). Hinsley wrote a shrewd letter to The Times, stressing President Roosevelt's commitment to freedom of conscience and arguing that Catholic schools should not be bullied by the state as they often provided for the poorest inner-city communities. In the event, after Hinsley's death, the Roman Catholic schools became Voluntary aided schools, accepting limited state aid whilst remaining largely autonomous.

Cardinal Hinsley, nearly blind and deaf, died from a heart attack at his country retreat of Hare Street House near Buntingford, at age 77. He was buried at Westminster Cathedral. Archbishop William Temple, of Canterbury, described him as "a most devoted citizen of his country ... [and] a most kindly and warmhearted friend". The Daily Mail described him as "the greatest English Cardinal since Wolsey ... and probably the best-loved Cardinal England ever had." The Diocese of Leeds' Pastoral and Conference Centre, Hinsley Hall, is named in honour of the Cardinal.

== Sources ==
- Howard, Anthony RAB: The Life of R. A. Butler, Jonathan Cape 1987 ISBN 978-0224018623

Catholic Church titles
Preceded by Francis Bourne	Archbishop of Westminster; 1935–1943	Succeeded by Bernard Griffin
Preceded by Alexis-Henri-Marie Lépicier	Cardinal priest of Santa Susanna; 1937–1943	Succeeded by Edward Aloysius Mooney
