= Leeds Cathedral =

Coordinates: 53°48′03″N 1°32′48″W

- Cathedral Church of St Anne
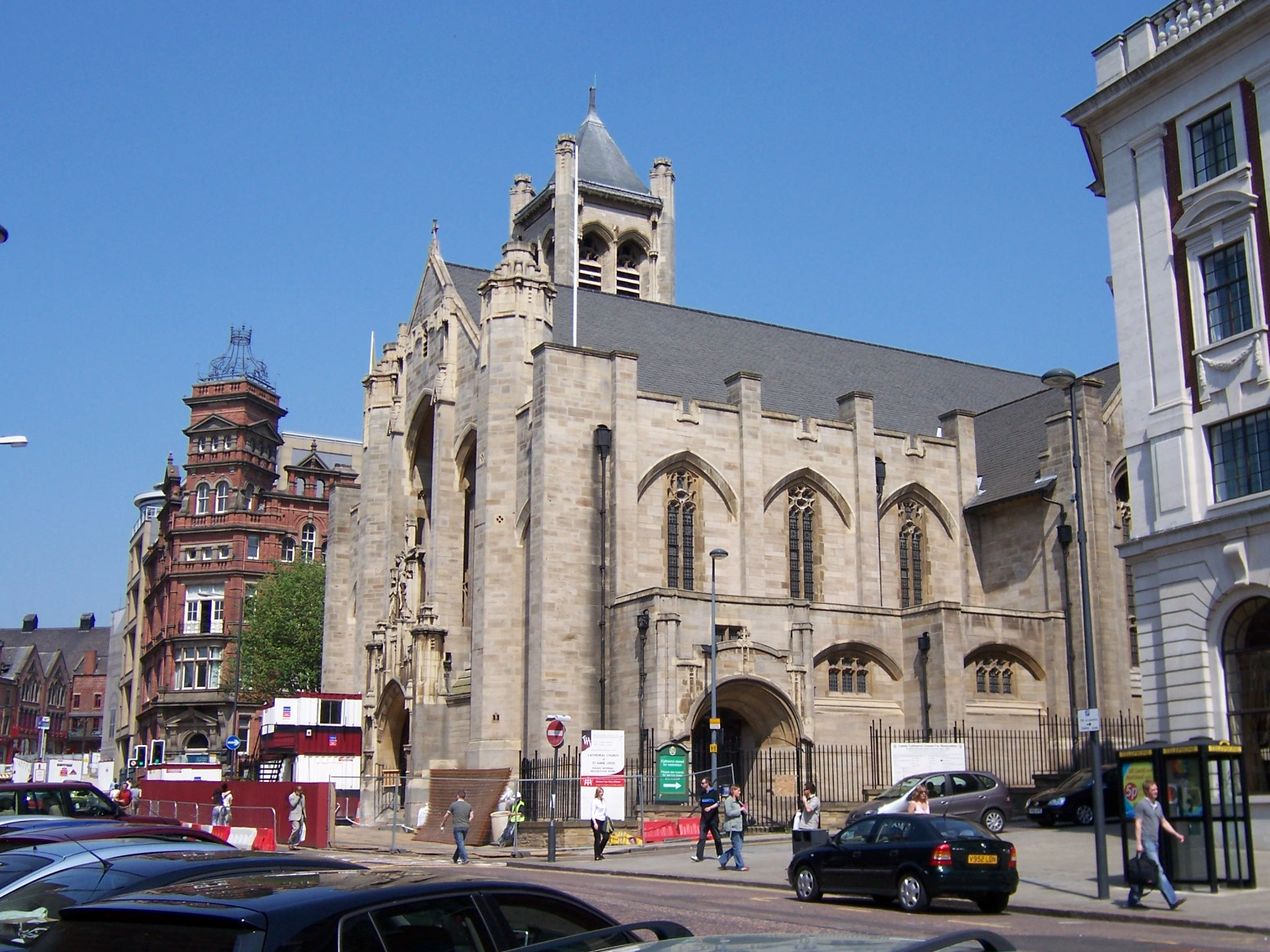

- Shown within West Yorkshire
- OS grid reference: SE 29947 33908
- Location: Leeds, West Yorkshire
- Country: England
- Denomination: Catholic Church
- Website: dioceseofleeds.org.uk/cathedral

History
- Consecrated: 1904

Architecture
- Heritage designation: Grade II*
- Architect: John Henry Eastwood
- Style: Neo-gothic
- Years built: 1901-1904

Administration
- Province: Liverpool (since 1911)
- Diocese: Leeds
- Deanery: Leeds North
- Parish: Mother of Unfailing Help

Clergy
- Bishop: Marcus Stock (since 2014)
- Dean: Matthew Habron (since 2019)

Leeds Cathedral, formally the Cathedral Church of St Anne, also known as Saint Anne's Cathedral, is the cathedral of the Roman Catholic Diocese of Leeds, and is the seat of the Roman Catholic Bishop of Leeds. It is in the city of Leeds, West Yorkshire, United Kingdom. The city of Leeds does not have a Church of England cathedral although it is in the Anglican Diocese of Leeds, which has cathedrals in Ripon, Wakefield and Bradford. The city instead has Leeds Minster, its former parish church.

The original cathedral was located in St Anne's Church in 1878, but that building was demolished around 1900. The current cathedral building on Cookridge Street was completed in 1904, and was restored in 2006. The reredos of the old cathedral's high altar was designed by Pugin in 1842 and moved to the lady chapel of the new cathedral. The cathedral is a Grade II* listed building.

The cathedral and the Church of the Holy Rosary on Chapeltown Road together serve the Leeds parish of Our Lady of Unfailing Help.

== History ==
=== Previous cathedral ===
In 1786, Lady Lane Chapel was built, the first post-Reformation Catholic place of worship in the city. In 1838, it was replaced by St Anne's Church. At the time, there were only two places of Catholic worship in Leeds, St Patrick's Church (which was built in 1831) and St Anne's. The next church to be built in Leeds was Mount St Mary's Church in Richmond Hill.

The earlier St Anne's Roman Catholic Church, built in 1838 on the corner of the Headrow and Cookridge Street was granted cathedral status in 1878 upon the creation of the Diocese of Leeds. The cathedral's life was short-lived as in 1899, Leeds Corporation pushed ahead with plans to widen The Headrow and develop it into a Boulevard style street. This meant that the cathedral was acquired by the enactment of a compulsory purchase order. Demolition started shortly after and the Leeds Permanent Building Society purchased the plot to build its head-office; the site is now The Light entertainment complex. Church officials considered several sites on which to build the second cathedral but after exhausting other options, the church accepted land offered to it by the corporation, directly adjacent to the previous church. Some architectural features of the original building were salvaged and reused in the new building and some can now be seen at the Castle-by-the-Sea Hotel in Scarborough, North Yorkshire, the former residence of the artist Atkinson Grimshaw, who was the father of the first cathedral choir master, Arthur E. Grimshaw.

=== Current building ===
The current cathedral was designed in the Arts and Crafts Gothic Revival style by John Henry Eastwood (1843–1913), a Leeds-born and London-based architect with previous experience in designing church buildings, much work was also carried out by his assistant, Sydney Kyffin Greenslade (1866–1955). The layout of the cathedral incorporated no wings, in order to accommodate it on the small site. Building work began in the autumn of 1901 and the cathedral opened in 1904.

After renovation in the cathedral (2005–2006) relics of English Catholic martyrs, Blessed Peter Snow and Ralph Grimston, were placed in the altar.

== Building ==
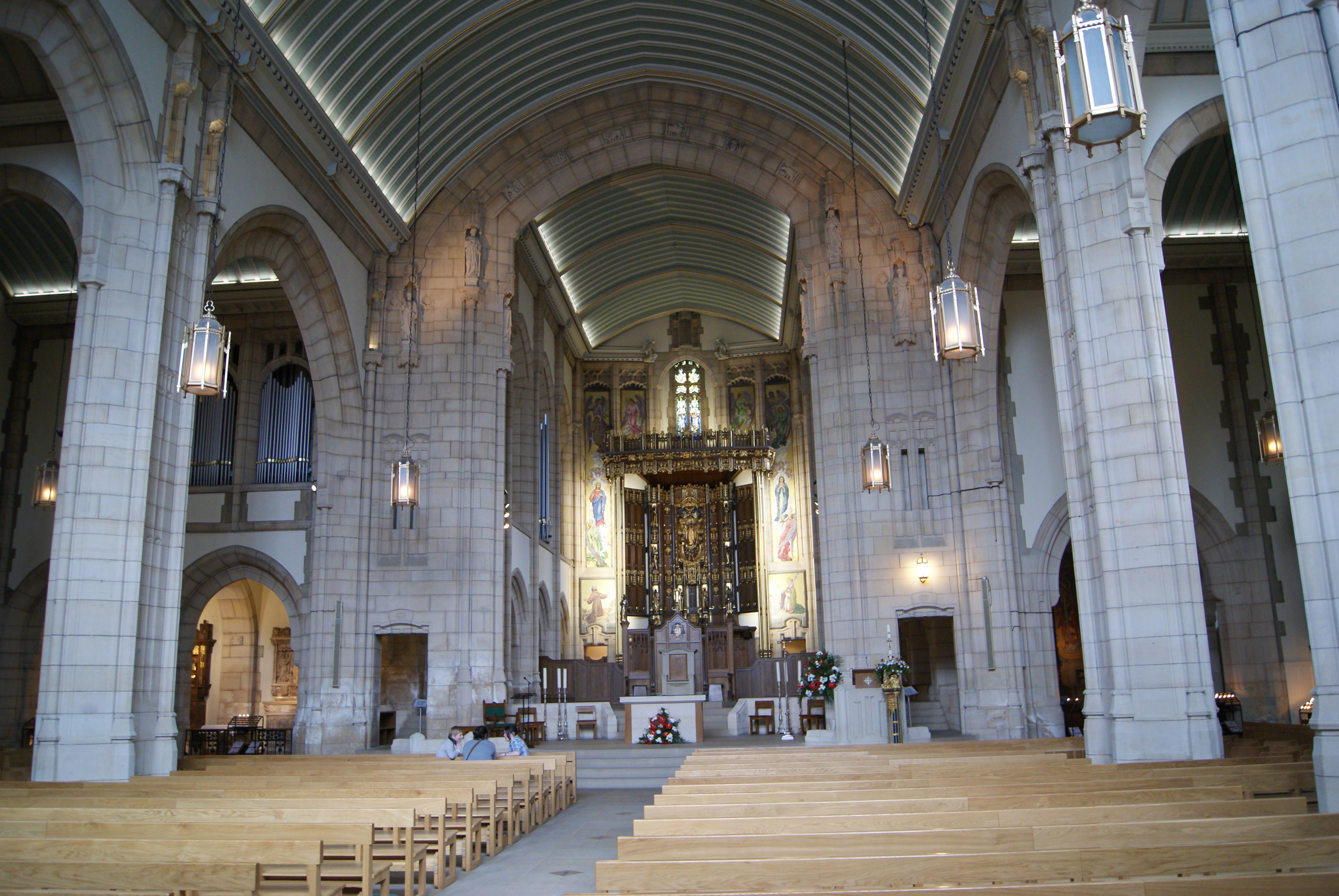
Interior (looking towards the altar)

The cathedral is small in size due to its restricted site. The cathedral has an aisled nave and chancel under a continuous roof with narrow transepts and chapels. There is a chapter house and presbytery. It is built of Weldon stone with Ketton stone details. The west front has a tall gable between large buttresses that end in Gothic turrets. The western face has a large ornate crucifix sculpture. The northern face has mock-Georgian elements to it, including leaded bay windows. The church has a small tower to the north west corner, from which the flag of Vatican City is flown on special occasions. The interior has a conventional layout, with rows of pews facing towards the altar, there are two rows of stone pillars set along each side. The ceiling has a barrelled shape, with only a faint apex.

The Cathedral's Pastoral and Conference Centre, known as Cathedral Hall, is located next to the Cathedral in St. Anne's Street.

== Organs ==
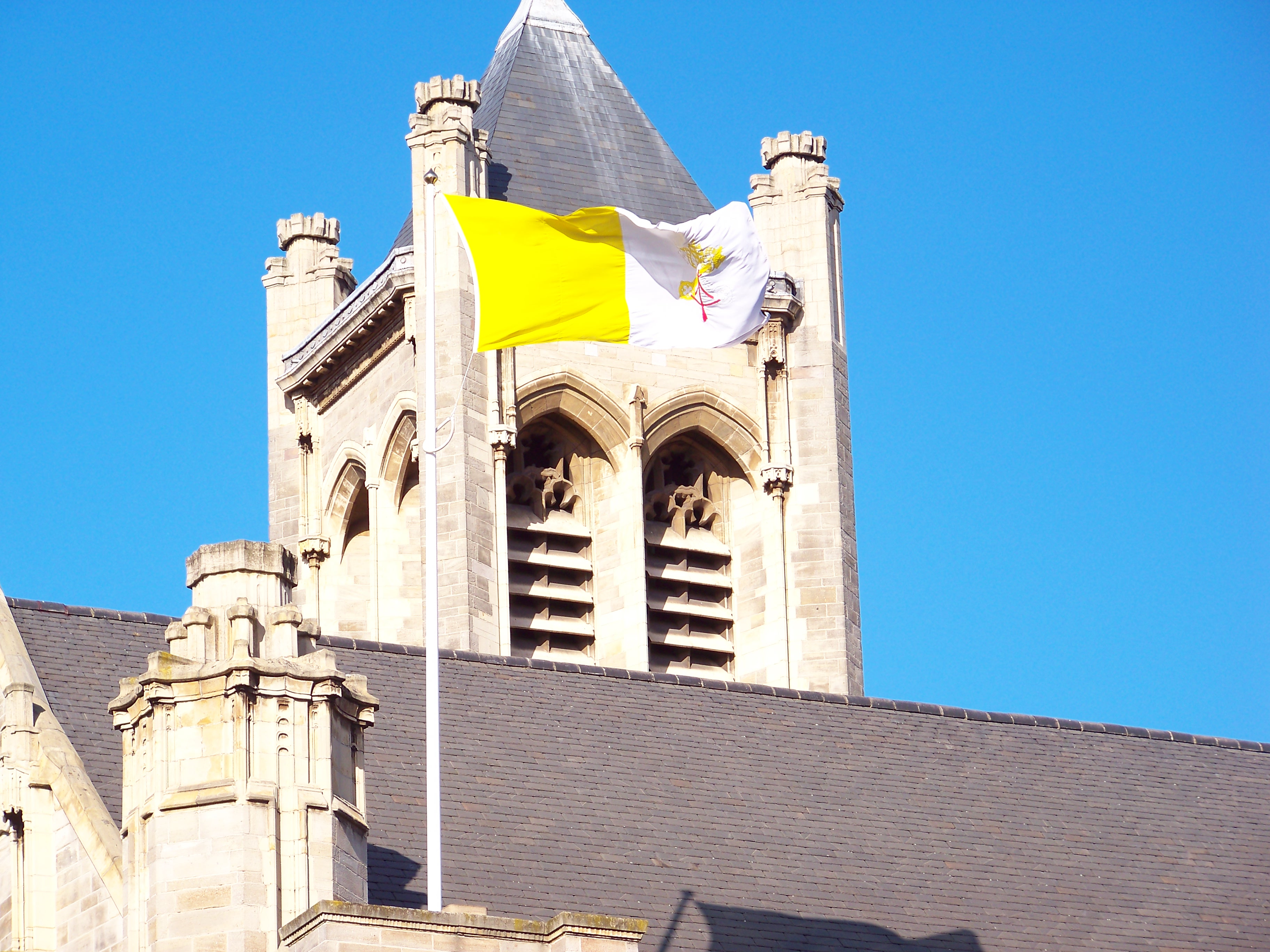
Flag of Vatican City flying atop the cathedral

The 1904 organ by Norman and Beard was restored and enlarged in 2010 by Klais Orgelbau. It has seven divisions and 55 ranks.

The cathedral also houses a chamber organ. This small box organ was manufactured by Peter Collins in 1992. It is a portable instrument and is usually located between the choir stalls in the Sanctuary. It is in daily use to accompany Gregorian chant.

== See also ==
- Grade II* listed buildings in Leeds
- Listed buildings in Leeds (City and Hunslet Ward - northern area)
