= John Heenan (cardinal) =

English Catholic prelate (1905–1975)

His Eminence John Carmel Heenan
- Cardinal, Archbishop of Westminster
- Province: Westminster
- Diocese: Westminster
- Appointed: 2 September 1963
- Term ended: 7 November 1975
- Predecessor: William Godfrey
- Successor: Basil Hume
- Other post: Cardinal-Priest of San Silvestro in Capite
- Previous posts: Bishop of Leeds (1951–1957); Archbishop of Liverpool (1957–1963)

Orders
- Ordination: 6 July 1930 by Arthur Henry Doubleday
- Consecration: 27 January 1951 by William Godfrey
- Created cardinal: 22 February 1965 by Paul VI
- Rank: Cardinal-Priest

Personal details
- Born: 26 January 1905 Ilford, Essex
- Died: 7 November 1975 (aged 70) London, England
- Buried: Westminster Cathedral
- Denomination: Roman Catholic
- Motto: Sub umbra carmeli
- Coat of arms

John Carmel Heenan (26 January 1905 – 7 November 1975) was a senior-ranking English prelate of the Catholic Church. He served as Archbishop of Westminster from 1963 until his death, and was elevated to the cardinalate in 1965.

== Biography ==
=== Early life and ordination ===
John Heenan was born in Ilford, Essex, the youngest of four children of Irish parents John and Anne Heenan (née Pilkington). He auditioned for Westminster Cathedral Choir School at age 9, but Sir Richard Terry rejected him for his "metallic voice". Heenan studied at St. Ignatius College in Stamford Hill, Ushaw College in Durham, and the Venerable English College in Rome before being ordained to the priesthood on 6 July 1930. He then did pastoral work in Brentwood until 1947, at which time he became Superior of the Catholic Missionary Society of England and Wales. In this position, Heenan criticized the United States for being too concerned about communism, and not enough about spiritual matters. By this time he had published a biography (1943) of Cardinal Hinsley, Archbishop of Westminster, who had recently died.

=== Bishop ===
On 27 January 1951, Heenan was appointed the fifth Bishop of Leeds by Pope Pius XII. He received his episcopal consecration on the following 12 March from Archbishop William Godfrey, Apostolic Delegate to Great Britain, with Joseph McCormack, Bishop of Hexham and Newcastle, and John Petit, Bishop of Menevia, serving as co-consecrators. Named the sixth Archbishop of Liverpool on 2 May 1957, Heenan was later appointed the eighth Archbishop of Westminster on 2 September 1963. As Archbishop of Westminster, he served as the spiritual leader of the Catholic Church in England and Wales. In 1968, Heenan was elected President of the Catholic Bishops' Conference of England and Wales.

=== Positions during the Second Vatican Council ===
A participant of the Second Vatican Council (1962–1965), Heenan showed himself to be of a conservative mind. He opposed Gaudium et spes, the council's constitution on the church in the modern world, saying that it had been "written by clerics with no knowledge of the world". He also condemned the periti, or theological experts, who sought to change the church's doctrine on birth control. Moreover, despite the risks to ecumenism, Heenan later supported the canonization of the forty martyrs.

=== Cardinal ===
He was created Cardinal-Priest of S. Silvestro in Capite by Pope Paul VI in the consistory of 22 February 1965.

He died from a heart attack in London at age 70, and is buried in Westminster Cathedral, under the twelfth Station of the Cross ("Jesus dies on the Cross").

Heenan shared a lengthy correspondence with author Evelyn Waugh regarding the Second Vatican Council. A compilation of their letters, A Bitter Trial: Evelyn Waugh and John Carmel Cardinal Heenan on the Liturgical Changes, was first published in 1996 and reprinted in an expanded edition in 2011.

== Quotes ==
- "A church that is half empty is half full."
- "At home it is not only women and children but also fathers of families and young men who come regularly to mass. If we were to offer them the kind of ceremony we saw yesterday in the Sistine Chapel we would soon be left with a congregation mostly of women and children."

== See also ==
Catholic Church titles
Preceded by Henry Poskitt	Bishop of Leeds; 1951–1957	Succeeded by George Patrick Dwyer
Preceded by William Godfrey	Archbishop of Liverpool; 1957–1963	Succeeded by George Andrew Beck
Preceded by William Godfrey	Archbishop of Westminster; 1963–1975	Succeeded by Basil Hume
Preceded by Valerio Valeri	Cardinal Priest of S. Silvestro in Capite; 1965–1975	Succeeded by Basil Hume
