= Roman Catholic Bishop of Leeds =

Catholic bishopric in England

Bishop of Leeds
- Bishopric

catholic
- Incumbent: Marcus Stock

Location
- Ecclesiastical province: Liverpool

Information
- First holder: Robert Cornthwaite
- Established: 20 December 1878
- Diocese: Leeds
- Cathedral: Leeds Cathedral

Website
- Bishop of Leeds

The Bishop of Leeds is the Ordinary of the Roman Catholic Diocese of Leeds in the Province of Liverpool, England.

The Vicariate Apostolic of the Yorkshire District was elevated to diocese status as the Diocese of Beverley on 29 September 1850, which was suppressed on 20 December 1878 and its area was divided into the dioceses of Leeds and Middlesbrough.

The Diocese of Leeds covers an area of 4,075 km^{2} (1,600 sq mi) and consists of "the whole of West Yorkshire (with the exception of the parish of Todmorden) together with parishes in the East Riding, North Yorkshire, Greater Manchester and Lancashire." The see is in the city of Leeds where the bishop's seat is located at the Cathedral Church of Saint Anne, Cookridge Street.

On 15 September 2014, Pope Francis appointed Monsignor Marcus Stock, at the time, the General Secretary of the Bishops' Conference, as the 10th Bishop of Leeds. He was consecrated as Bishop on 13 November 2014.

== List of the Bishops of Leeds ==
Catholic Bishops of Leeds
From	Until	Incumbent	Notes
1878	1890	Robert Cornthwaite	Previously Bishop of Beverley (1861–1878). Appointed Bishop of Leeds on 20 December 1878. Died in office on 16 June 1890.
1890	1911	William Gordon	Appointed Coadjutor Bishop of Leeds on 28 December 1889 and consecrated on 24 February 1890. Succeeded Diocesan Bishop of Leeds on 16 June 1890. Died in office on 7 June 1911.
1911	1936	Joseph Cowgill	Appointed Coadjutor Bishop of Leeds on 26 September 1905 and consecrated on 30 November 1905. Succeeded Diocesan Bishop of Leeds on 7 June 1911. Died in office on 12 May 1936.
1936	1950	Henry Poskitt	Appointed bishop on 19 August 1936 and consecrated on 21 September 1936. Died in office on 19 February 1950.
1951	1957	John Heenan	Appointed bishop on 12 March 1951 and consecrated on 12 March 1951. Translated to Liverpool on 2 May 1957.
1957	1965	George Dwyer	Appointed bishop on 3 August 1957 and consecrated on 24 September 1957. Translated to Birmingham on 5 October 1965.
1966	1985	William Gordon Wheeler	Previously Coadjutor Bishop of Middlesbrough (1964–1964). Appointed Bishop of Leeds on 25 April 1966 and installed on 27 June 1966. Retired on 12 July 1985 and died on 21 February 1998.
1985	2004	David Konstant	Formerly an auxiliary bishop of Westminster (1977–1985). Appointed Bishop of Leeds on 12 July 1985 and installed on 12 July 1985. Resigned on 7 April 2004 and died on 9 October 2016 (buried in Leeds Cathedral)
2004	2012	Arthur Roche	Formerly an auxiliary bishop of Westminster (2001–2002). Appointed Coadjutor Bishop of Leeds on 16 July 2002 and succeeded on 7 April 2004. Appointed the Secretary of the Congregation for Divine Worship and Discipline of the Sacraments on 26 June 2012. Served as Apostolic Administrator of the Diocese of Leeds until the end of September.
2014	Present	Marcus Stock	Formerly a priest and Honorary Prelate of Birmingham (1988–2014). Appointed Bishop of Leeds on 15 September 2014 and consecrated on 13 November 2014.
