= Roman Catholic Diocese of Leeds =

Catholic diocese in England

Diocese of Leeds Dioecesis Loidensis

Catholic
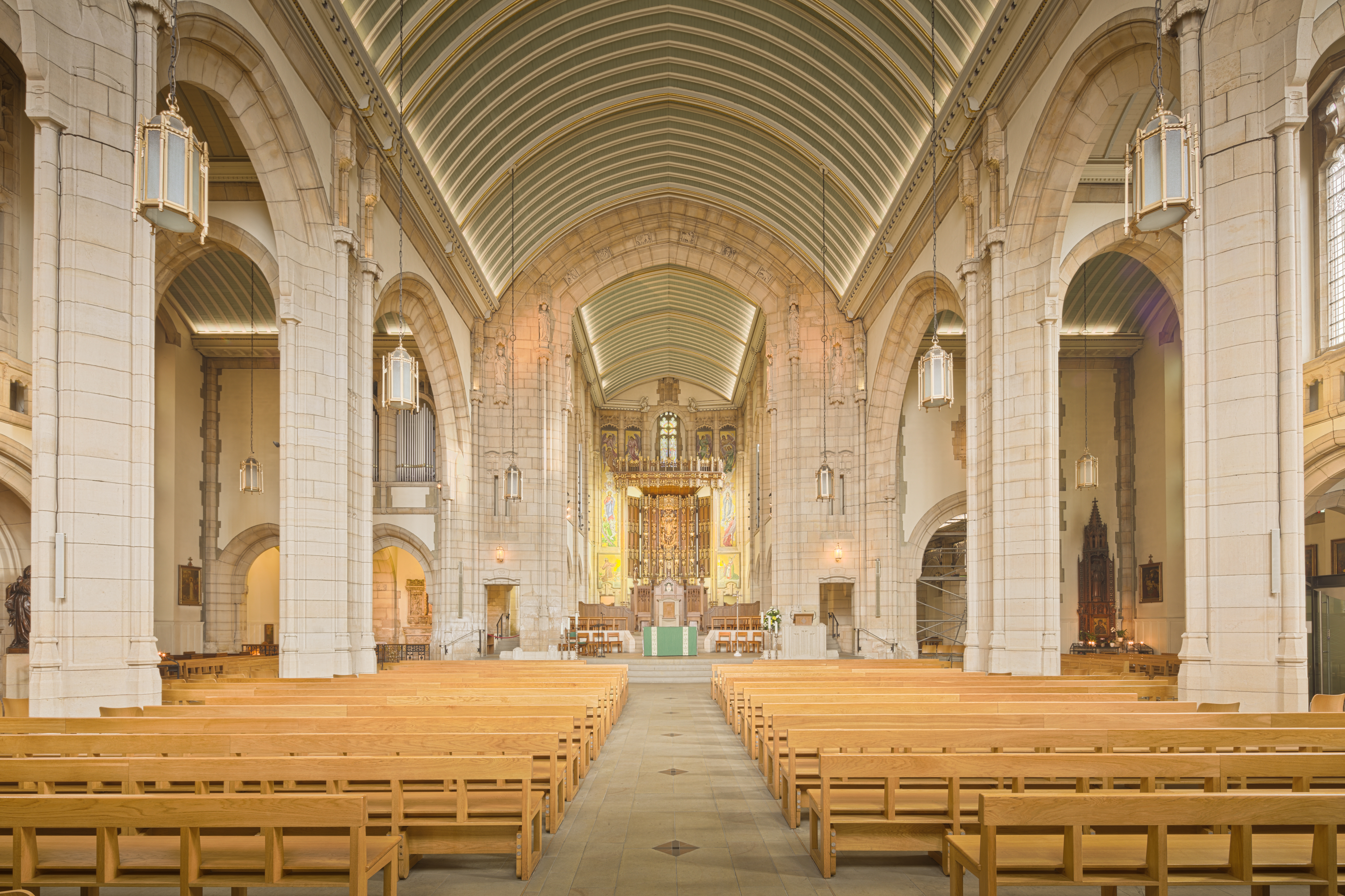
- Nave of Leeds Cathedral

- Coat of arms

Location
- Country: England
- Territory: West Yorkshire; With parts of: North Yorkshire; East Riding of Yorkshire; Lancashire; Greater Manchester
- Ecclesiastical province: Liverpool
- Metropolitan: Archdiocese of Liverpool
- Deaneries: 11

Statistics
- Area: 1,900 sq mi (4,900 km^{2})
- Population: Total; Catholics: (as of 2019); 2,115,000; 168,000 (7.9%)
- Parishes: 82
- Churches: 108
- Schools: 93

Information
- Denomination: Catholic
- Sui iuris church: Latin Church
- Rite: Roman Rite
- Established: 29 September 1850
- Cathedral: Saint Anne's Cathedral, Leeds
- Patron saint: Our Lady of Perpetual Succour; St Wilfrid
- Secular priests: 187

Current leadership
- Pope: Leo XIV
- Bishop: Marcus Stock
- Metropolitan Archbishop: John Francis Sherrington
- Vicar General: Paul Fisher
- Episcopal Vicars: Timothy Swinglehurst
- Bishops emeritus: Arthur Roche

Map
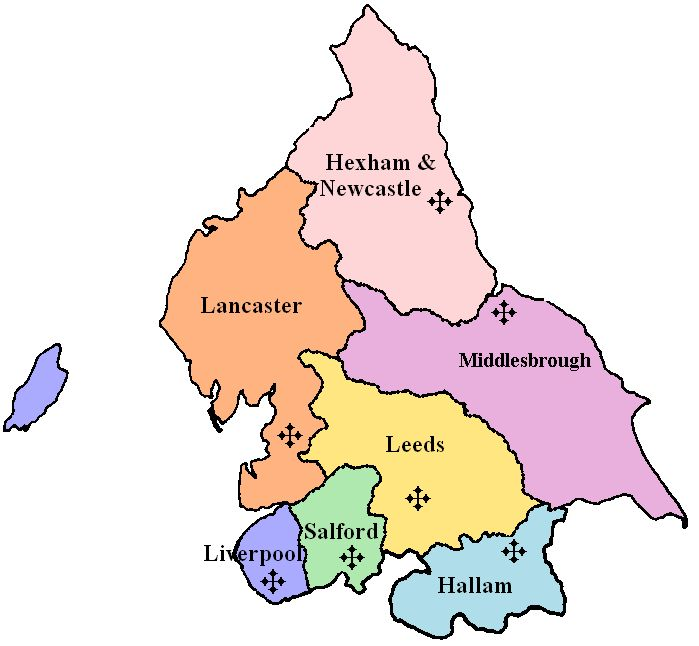
- The Diocese of Leeds within the Province of Liverpool

Website
- dioceseofleeds.org.uk

The Diocese of Leeds (Latin: Dioecesis Loidensis) is a Latin Church diocese of the Catholic Church centred on Leeds Cathedral in the city of Leeds in West Yorkshire, England. It was founded on 20 December 1878, with the splitting of the Diocese of Beverley, which had covered all of Yorkshire. The Diocese of Leeds was made to cover the historic West Riding of Yorkshire, while the Diocese of Middlesbrough took over the diocesan organisation of the rest of Yorkshire.

== History ==
In the 19th century, the region covered by the modern diocese fell under the jurisdiction of Vicar Apostolic of the Northern District, which in turn became the Apostolic Vicariate of the Yorkshire District, which was then elevated to the distinction of Diocese of Beverley in 1850. Around 1861, Bishop of Beverley Robert Cornthwaite, informed the Holy See that in his opinion, the Diocese of Beverley was too large, and in light of the expanding Catholic population, should be sub-divided into two regions. After 15 years of discussion and planning, it was agreed that on 20 December 1878, the Diocese of Beverley be dissolved and that the Diocese of Leeds be created to cater for the West Riding of Yorkshire and those parishes in the City of York to the south of the River Ouse, and the Diocese of Middlesbrough, covering the North and East Ridings of Yorkshire and those parishes in the City of York to the north of the River Ouse. However, in 1982 the two York parishes south of the River Ouse were ceded to the Diocese of Middlesbrough to unite the City of York under one bishop. In 1980, fifty parishes in the South Yorkshire region of the diocese were transferred from Leeds to the newly formed Diocese of Hallam. The parish of Howden was transferred from the Middlesbrough diocese to the Leeds diocese in 2004.

A diocesan mission was established in Peru in 1961 by Bishop Dywer, helping the Columban Fathers who were working with the people of the shanty towns of the capital city, Lima.

=== Patronal Feasts of the Diocese ===
Patron	Date
Our Lady of Perpetual Succour	27 June
St Wilfrid	12 October

== Bishops ==
=== Ordinaries ===
See Diocese of Beverley for bishops of that diocese.

- Robert Cornthwaite: Translated Bishop of Leeds, (1878–1890)
- William Gordon (1890–1911)
- Joseph Robert Cowgill (1911–1936)
- Henry John Poskitt (1936–1950)
- John Carmel Heenan (1951–1957)
- George Patrick Dwyer (1957–1965)
- Gordon Wheeler (1966–1985)
- David Konstant (1985–2004)
- Arthur Roche (2002–2012)
- Marcus Stock (2014–).

=== Coadjutor Bishops ===
- Joseph Robert Cowgill (1905–1911)
- William Gordon (1889–1890)
- Arthur Roche (2002–2004)

=== Auxiliary Bishop ===
- Gerald Moverley (1967–1980), appointed Bishop of Hallam

=== Other priests of this diocese who became bishops ===
- Arthur Hinsley (priest here, 1893–1905), appointed titular bishop in 1926; later Cardinal
- Thomas Kevin O'Brien, appointed auxiliary bishop of Middlesbrough in 1981
- Arthur Grange Riddell, appointed Bishop of Northampton in 1880
- Thomas Shine, appointed auxiliary bishop of Middlesbrough in 1921
- John Wilson, appointed auxiliary bishop of Westminster in 2015 - later Archbishop of Southwark
- Philip Moger, appointed auxiliary bishop of Southwark in 2022, now Emeritus Bishop of Plymouth
