= St Mary's College, Middlesbrough =

St Mary's College

Location
- Saltersgill Avenue; Middlesbrough, TS4 3JP; England; 54°32′47″N 1°13′54″W

Information
- Religious affiliation: Roman Catholic
- Established: 1904
- Closed: 2011
- Local authority: Middlesbrough
- Department for Education URN: 130572 Tables
- Ofsted: Reports
- Gender: Coeducational
- Age: 16 to 18
- Enrolment: 498 (2008/09)
- Diocese: Middlesbrough

St Mary's College was a voluntary aided Catholic college situated in Saltersgill, Middlesbrough, England. Tracing its roots back to 1904, it was the only Catholic further education provision in the region of Teesside for over 50 years.

In 2011, St Mary's College, along with two other Catholic schools, closed. Its buildings, staff and educational provision were merged with the other schools to form Trinity Catholic College, Middlesbrough.

In 2018, much of the building previously occupied by St Mary's Sixth Form underwent an extensive renovation, becoming Postgate House, the headquarters of the Nicholas Postgate Catholic Academy Trust, which manages 27 schools across the Diocese of Middlesbrough. In 2019, Trinity Catholic College Sixth Form relocated from the old St Mary's site to a brand-new sixth form centre based on the school's main Lacy Road campus.

== History ==
=== Grammar school ===
Under Middlesbrough Education Committee, it was the St Mary's College RC Grammar School, a voluntary aided grammar school, with around 750 boys. Before around 1962 it was on The Avenue. The site on Saltersgill Avenue was between Acklam Hall Grammar School to the west and Middlesbrough High School, in Marton, to the east. Also in Middlesbrough was its sister school, St Mary's Convent R.C. Grammar School FCJ with around 600 girls on Newlands Road in Linthorpe, formerly known as Newlands Grammar School previous to when it moved to Saltersgill Avenue at the same time that St Mary's College moved there. In 1974 it became Newlands School FCJ, latterly the Newlands Catholic School FCJ, a mixed comprehensive, and closed in 2009, and became Trinity Catholic College, when it merged with St David's Roman Catholic Technology College.

=== Sixth form college ===
In 1968, Middlesbrough Education Committee changed its admissions policy and it became a sixth form college in 1974, also known then as a senior high school.

== Academic performance ==
St Mary's described itself as a "Catholic College for the whole community", and was the only sixth form college of its type in the Northern region. The college offered A levels across the Sciences, Mathematics, Humanities, Arts and Modern Languages subject areas, as well as GCSEs in a number of subjects.

In 2010 Ofsted carried out an inspection at St Mary's and found the college to be inadequate. This, along with falling student numbers due to competition from the upgraded Middlesbrough College, meant the decision was made for the school to close in the summer of 2011.

== Closure and merger ==
The college was officially dissolved on 31 July 2011. The post-16 education provision provided by St Mary's College was taken over by Trinity Catholic College, which expanded to offer sixth form provision, housed in St Mary's old site at Saltersgill Avenue. Students enrolled at St Mary's were able to continue their education at Trinity.

The refurbished St Mary's building continued to accommodate Trinity Sixth Form until 2019, when the decision was taken to vacate the site entirely and relocate the sixth form to a brand-new centre on the school's multi-million pound Lacy Road campus. The old college building is now known as Postgate House, the headquarters of the Nicholas Postgate Catholic Academy Trust.

== Notable alumni ==
- Marcus Bentley, voice-over artist for Big Brother (TV series)
- Kevin Connelly, English comedian
- Steve Gibson, businessman, politician, sports executive
- Shiulie Ghosh, TV journalist
- Sean Gregan (footballer; born 1974), English footballer who previously played for Preston North End FC, West Bromwich Albion and Leeds United
- Keith Houchen, English footballer
- Liam Plunkett (cricketer; born 1985), English cricketer currently playing for Durham County
- Rob Smedley (Formula 1 engineer; born 1973), racing engineer for Felipe Massa at Scuderia Ferrari
- Holly Hagan reality TV personality of MTV show Geordie Shore
- Simon Clifford is an English football coach and businessman known for coaching in the UK with his Brazilian football schools

=== Grammar school ===
- Maurice Foley, CMG (1925–2002), British Labour Party politician, MP, junior minister and professional civil servant with the European Commission.
- Sir Martin Narey, director-general (1999–2003) of HM Prison Service, and chief executive (2005–2011) of Barnardo's Government Adoption Adviser
- Chris Rea, blues musician.
- Donald Tyerman CBE, editor The Economist (1956–65)
- Paul Vallely CMG, writer, journalist
