= Sacred Heart Church, Middlesbrough =

Sacred Heart Church
- Sacred Heart Church in the Parish of Saint Patrick
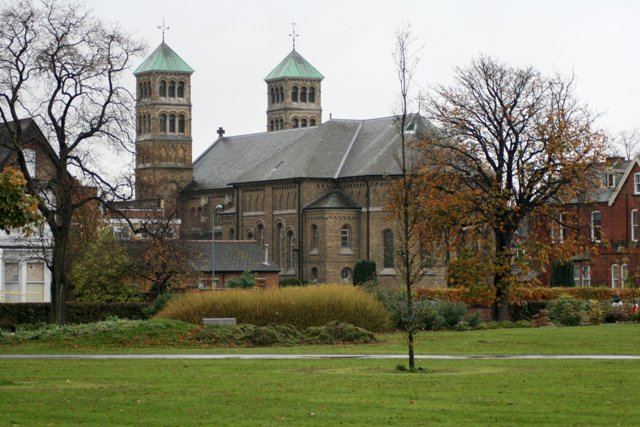
- South side of church
- Sacred Heart Church
- 54.5639°N 1.2412°W
- OS grid reference: NZ 49161 19007
- Location: Middlesbrough
- Country: England
- Denomination: Roman Catholic
- Website: SacredHeartMbro.org

History
- Former name(s): Sacred Heart of Jesus and St Philomena
- Status: Active
- Dedication: Sacred Heart

Architecture
- Functional status: Parish church
- Heritage designation: Grade II listed
- Designated: 28 July 1988
- Architect: Jules Coomans
- Style: Romanesque Revival
- Groundbreaking: 20 September 1930
- Completed: 1932

Administration
- Province: Liverpool
- Diocese: Middlesbrough
- Deanery: Northern Vicariate
- Parish: Saint Patrick

Sacred Heart Church formerly the Church of Sacred Heart and St Philomena is a Roman Catholic Parish church in the town centre of Middlesbrough, North Yorkshire. It was built from 1930 to 1932 and is based on the design of St Andrew's Abbey in Bruges, Belgium. It is situated on the west side of Albert Park on the Linthorpe Road. It is a Grade II listed building.

== History ==
=== Construction ===
The foundation stone of the church was laid on 20 September 1930 by the Bishop of Middlesbrough, Thomas Shine. In 1932 the church was opened, originally dedicated to the Sacred Heart of Jesus and St Philomena. The church architect was Jules Coomans (1871–1937), a Belgian architect from Ypres. He designed the War Victims Monument in Ypres and there is a street is named after him there. He also worked on various renovations and construction of churches in Ypres and Bruges.

=== Developments ===
In 1953, stained glass windows were installed around the sanctuary in the church. The windows were designed by the studio Harry Clarke in Dublin, Ireland. From 1961 to 1967, mosaics designed by Ludwig Oppenheimer from Manchester were also installed.

In the 1960s, the name of the church changed to become Sacred Heart Church.

== Parish ==
In the 2000s, the two other Roman Catholic churches in the city centre closed. In 2000, the former cathedral of the Diocese of Middlesbrough, St Mary's Church on Sussex Street, was destroyed in a fire. Two years later, in 2002, St Patrick's Church on Cannon Street was closed and demolished. These three parishes were combined into one and – to help reflect the traditions of the three parishes – the new parish was named Saint Patrick but dedication of the Church remains that of the Sacred Heart.

The church hosts two Sunday Masses at 9:30 am and at 6:30 pm. It also has weekday Masses at 9:15 am on Mondays, at 6:30 pm on Tuesdays and at 9:15 am on Wednesday, Thursday and Friday and at 9:00 am on Saturday.

== Exterior ==
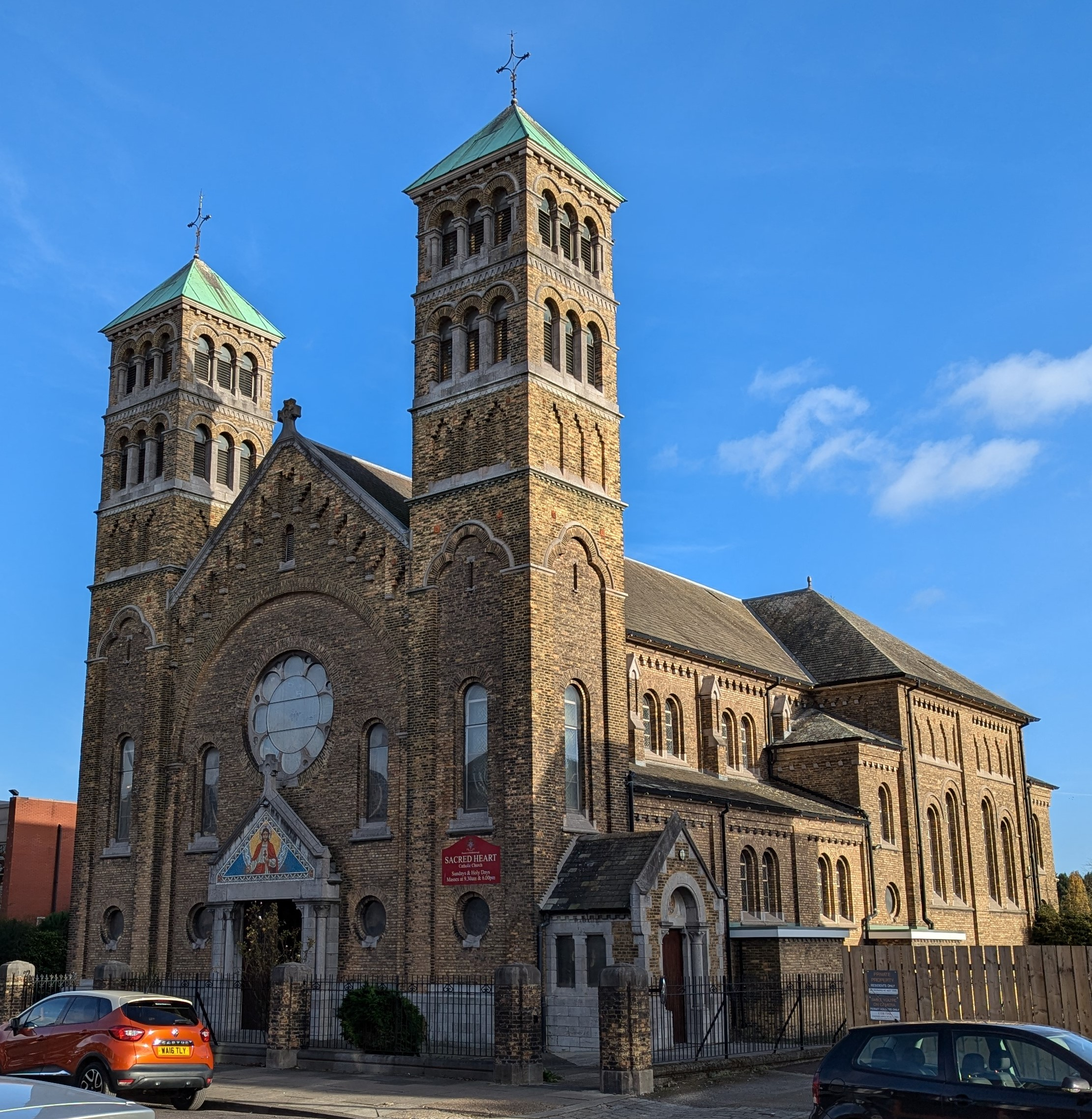
Church entrance

== See also ==
- Roman Catholic Diocese of Middlesbrough
