= St Peter's Catholic College, South Bank =

Academy in North Yorkshire, England

Coordinates: 54.5737°N 1.1695°W

St Peter's Catholic College

Location
- Normanby Road; South Bank; North Yorkshire, TS6 6SP; England

Information
- Type: Academy
- Motto: One Faith, One Family, One Future
- Religious affiliation: Roman Catholic
- Local authority: Redcar and Cleveland
- Trust: Nicholas Postgate Catholic Academy Trust
- Department for Education URN: 140751 Tables
- Ofsted: Reports
- Chair: Nicky Jamalizadeh
- Executive Headteacher: Michael Burns
- Head of School: Steph Garthwaite
- Gender: Coeducational
- Age: 11 to 16
- Enrolment: 510 (2017)
- Language: English
- Colours: School Colours: Purple; Green; Trust Colours: Postgate Purple; Green; Yellow
- Affiliations: Diocese of Middlesbrough, Trinity Catholic College, St Patrick’s Catholic College, Sacred Heart Catholic Secondary
- Website: https://stpeters.npcat.org.uk/

St Peter's Catholic College is a coeducational secondary school located in South Bank, North Yorkshire, England. It is part of the Nicholas Postgate Catholic Academy Trust.

Founded in 1940, it has served the Diocese of Middlesbrough for over 75 years, achieving academy status in 2014, having previously been a specialist college in maths and technology.

The school has been a member of the Nicholas Postgate Catholic Academy Trust since 2018, a multi academy trust which sponsors 37 academies across the Diocese of Middlesbrough, including Trinity Catholic College in Middlesbrough, St Patrick’s Catholic College in Thornaby and Sacred Heart Catholic Secondary in Redcar.

The school offers sixth form provision through Trinity Catholic College Sixth Form in Middlesbrough. In 2020, the school announced an extensive multi-million pound redevelopment of its site, including the construction of a new digital learning wing and sports and recreational facilities.

The current executive headteacher is Michael Burns, and the head of school is Steph Garthwaite. The chair of governors is Nicky Jamalizadeh.

== Ofsted judgements ==
The school was judged Inadequate by Ofsted in 2017. It was inspected again in 2019 and judged Requires Improvement.

== Extra-curricular activities ==
=== Sport ===
The sporting schedule is arranged by season and currently covers;

- Football
- Netball
- Rugby
- Athletics

=== Performing Arts ===
Opportunities for students to engage in music and drama include;

- Music Club
- Drama Club

=== Subject Specific ===
- Poetry Lectures
- Maths Lectures
- Science Club
- French Club

=== Other ===
- Cooking Club
- Homework Club
- Chess Club
- Dungeons and Dragons Club

== Notable former pupils ==
- Vin Garbutt, folk singer
- Wilf Mannion, footballer
- Rob Smedley, F1 Engineer
- Greg Clark, Member of Parliament for Tunbridge Wells
- Chris Cooke, Mayor of Middlesbrough
