= St. David's High School =

St. David's High School or similar may refer to:

== United States ==
- St. David High School (Arizona) in St. David, Arizona
- St. David High School, a component of St. David's School

== United Kingdom ==
- St. David's RC High School, Dalkeith, Midlothian, Scotland
- St. David's High School, Saltney

== Elsewhere ==
- SMK Tinggi St David (also known as St. David's High School), Malacca, Malaysia

== See also ==
- St. David School (disambiguation)
- St. David's School (disambiguation)
- St David's College (disambiguation)
