= Trinity Catholic College, Middlesbrough =

Trinity Catholic College

Location
- Lacy Road; Middlesbrough, North Yorkshire, TS4 3JW; England; 54.5457°N 1.2311°W

Information
- Type: Academy
- Motto: Follow Jesus, Build Families, Fulfil Potential
- Religious affiliation: Roman Catholic
- Established: September 2009
- Local authority: Middlesbrough
- Trust: Nicholas Postgate Catholic Academy Trust
- Department for Education URN: 142382 Tables
- Ofsted: Reports
- Chair: Vicky White
- Head teacher: Michael Blair
- Age: 11 to 19
- Enrolment: 1,300
- Houses: Bede, Clitherow, Fisher, Postgate, Hilda
- Colours: School Colours: Gold; Black; Trust Colours: Postgate Purple; Green; Yellow
- Song: Do Not be Afraid
- Affiliations: Diocese of Middlesbrough, St Peter’s Catholic College, St Patrick’s Catholic College, Sacred Heart Catholic Secondary
- Website: https://trinity.npcat.org.uk

Trinity Catholic College is a large, co-educational secondary school and sixth form in the town of Middlesbrough, North Yorkshire, England. It is part of Nicholas Postgate Catholic Academy Trust.

== History ==
Founded in 2009 following the amalgamation of St David's Roman Catholic Technology College, Newlands Catholic School FCJ, and St Mary's Catholic Sixth Form College, it is one of the largest Catholic secondary schools in the north east and the biggest in Teesside, with over 1,300 students on-roll.

The school is based on a multi-million-pound campus on Lacy Road, off Ladgate Lane. The campus includes a state-of-the-art main building and a newer sixth form centre. The campus opened in 2011 after over £24 million in investment through the Building Schools for the Future programme. In 2020, the school announced it would be further extending its facilities.

During the summer of 2022 there was another major investment in new facilities as the school opened the T6 Football Academy, in partnership with Middlesbrough Football Club.

The school has been a member of the Nicholas Postgate Catholic Academy Trust since 2018, a multi academy trust which sponsors 27 academies across the Diocese of Middlesbrough, including St Peter’s Catholic College in South Bank, St Patrick’s Catholic College in Thornaby and Sacred Heart Catholic Secondary in Redcar.

The school’s current headteacher is Michael Blair and the chair of governors is Vicky White. The trust's interim chief executive officer is Karen Siedle.

== Religion ==
The school bears the name of the Holy Trinity, a key doctrine of the Catholic Church, while its previous five houses each commemorate an English martyr or saint of the Church; the Blessed Nicholas Postgate, the Venerable St Bede, St Hilda of Whitby, St Margaret Clitherow, and St John Fisher.

The school used to operate with a vertical tutor system, where each child belonged to a House, rather than a year group. It has reverted back to a horizontal tutor system.
