= Middlesbrough Cathedral =

Catholic cathedral in Middlesbrough, England

Saint Mary's Cathedral, Middlesbrough
- Cathedral Church of Saint Mary
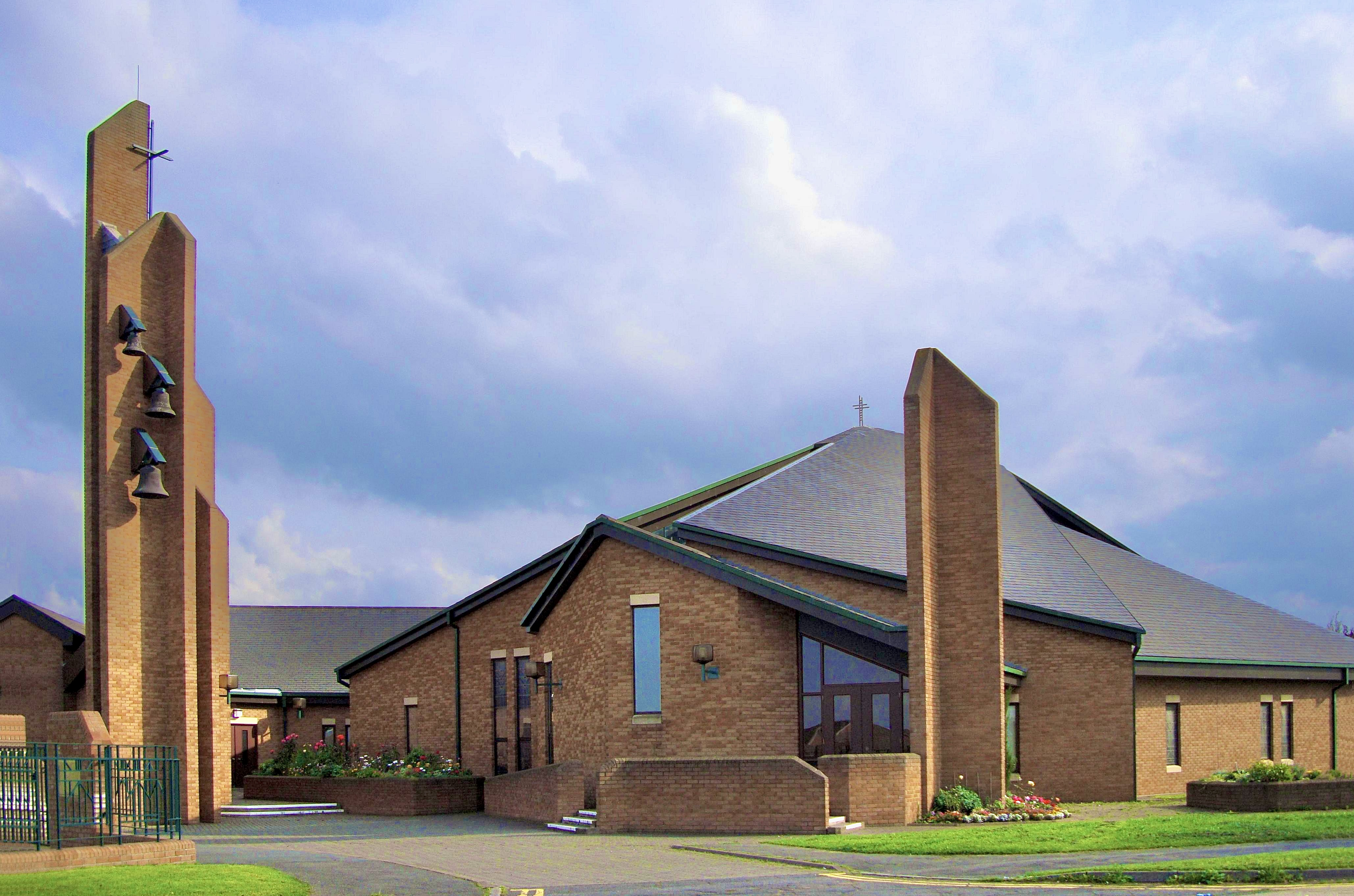

- Shown within North Yorkshire
- 54.5227°N 1.2137°W
- OS grid reference: NZ 50990 14442
- Location: Middlesbrough
- Country: England
- Denomination: Roman Catholic
- Website: middlesbroughrccathedral.org

History
- Status: Active
- Dedication: Saint Mary the Virgin
- Consecrated: 15 May 1988

Architecture
- Functional status: Cathedral
- Previous cathedrals: Cathedral of Our Lady of Perpetual Succour, Sussex Street
- Architect: Frank Swainston
- Groundbreaking: 3 November 1985

Administration
- Province: Liverpool
- Diocese: Middlesbrough

Clergy
- Bishop: Terence Patrick Drainey
- Dean: Canon Paul Farrer
- Priest: Rev Steven Leightell

Saint Mary's Cathedral, also known as Middlesbrough Cathedral, is a Roman Catholic cathedral in Coulby Newham, Middlesbrough, England. It is the see of the Bishop of Middlesbrough, who is ordinary of the Diocese of Middlesbrough in the Province of Liverpool.

== History ==
The original Cathedral Church of Our Lady Of Perpetual Succour was built from 1876 and was opened on 21 August 1878. It was situated on Sussex Street, in the old St. Hilda’s district of Middlesbrough. At the time, the church was located within the Diocese of Beverley as the diocese of Middlesbrough did not exist until December 1878. It was initially built not as a cathedral, but as a church that could hold 1,500 people to serve the people of Middlesbrough.

The first bishop of Middlesbrough, Richard Lacy was consecrated there on 18 December 1879.

In August 1984, news reports stated that the cathedral had structural problems and may have to be pulled down. As it was a Grade II listed building, any demolition was officially blocked. The shifting population of the town at the time also meant the cathedral had become more and more isolated. A new cathedral building was therefore required to replace the original. The new Saint Mary's Cathedral was built in the suburb of Coulby Newham, in the south of Middlesbrough, with building work commencing in November 1985.

The old cathedral was gutted by fire in May 2000. The fire was supposedly started by a group of children playing inside the building, which was by then already in a significant state of disrepair. Due to the extensive fire damage and risk of further collapse, the building was demolished soon after. The site is now the location of the Middlesbrough headquarters of Cleveland Police.

== Saint Mary's Cathedral ==
The original architect of the new cathedral at Coulby Newham was Frank Swainston, who died just after the outline plan had been agreed upon. His assistant Peter Fenton developed the detailed drawings and designed the cathedral furnishings. All this he brought to completion with the advice of J. O. Tarren and Professor Patrik Nuttgens.

The foundation stone was blessed on Sunday 3 November 1985 by Augustine Harris, Bishop of Middlesbrough, who went on to consecrate it on Sunday 15 May 1988.

The cathedral is a modern, light building similar in some ways to the Roman Catholic cathedral in Liverpool. The building complex includes the sanctuary, the nave, the Blessed Sacrament chapel, the sacristy, the church hall, the narthex (the entrance porch) and the campanile. There is also a repository where devotional aids, rosary beads, cards, and the like may be purchased. It was built to match the liturgical changes decreed following the Second Vatican Council. The council asked that all new churches should have an altar that is clearly visible to all and a liturgy that is audible to all.

== Music ==
=== Cathedral organ ===
The cathedral organ

Dr John Rowntree of the Organ Advisory Group (Society of St. Gregory), as consultant, established the requirements and design of the organ which was built by the firm of Schumacher of Europe in Belgium. The organ has two manuals and pedals, mechanical key and stop action and 16 stops. The case is of ash, in keeping with the furnishings of the cathedral, and its asymmetric form relates to its location off the central axis of the buildings and to the internal roof lines.

A specification of the organ can be found on the National Pipe Organ Register.

=== Cathedral Choral Foundation ===
The music tradition of the cathedral is encompassed by the cathedral’s Choral Foundation, led by the Cathedral and Diocesan Director of Music. Choirs which are part of the Choral Foundation include:

- Cathedral Choir (incorporating the Senior Choristers, Choral Scholars, and Adults)
- Cathedral Consort
- Cathedral Junior Choristers

The Diocesan Choir is formed from singers across the Diocese and sings at major Diocesan events. Although it is not one of the Cathedral's Choirs, it mainly sings at the Cathedral, although it has now started to sing more widely across the Diocese.

=== Choral service pattern ===
Currently the Cathedral Choir sings for the main Sunday morning Solemn Mass. Choral Vespers and Benediction is on a Wednesday evening, and these are led by the various other choirs that make up the Choral Foundation of the Cathedral Music Department.

Other services at the cathedral are also sung, however they are led by an organist or cantor.

==== Director of Music ====
Mr. Timothy Craig Harrison (2010–2021)

Mr. Steven Maxson (2022–present)
