= St. David's School =

St. David's School may refer to:

== United Kingdom ==
- St David's School, Middlesex
- St David's School, Middlesbrough

== United States ==
- St. David's School (Raleigh, NC)
- Saint David's School (New York City)
- St. David School (Richmond, California)

== See also ==
- St. David School (disambiguation)
- St. David's High School (disambiguation)
- St David's College (disambiguation)
