= Basil Hume =

English Catholic cardinal (1923–1999)

His Eminence Basil Hume OSB OM
- Cardinal, Archbishop of Westminster
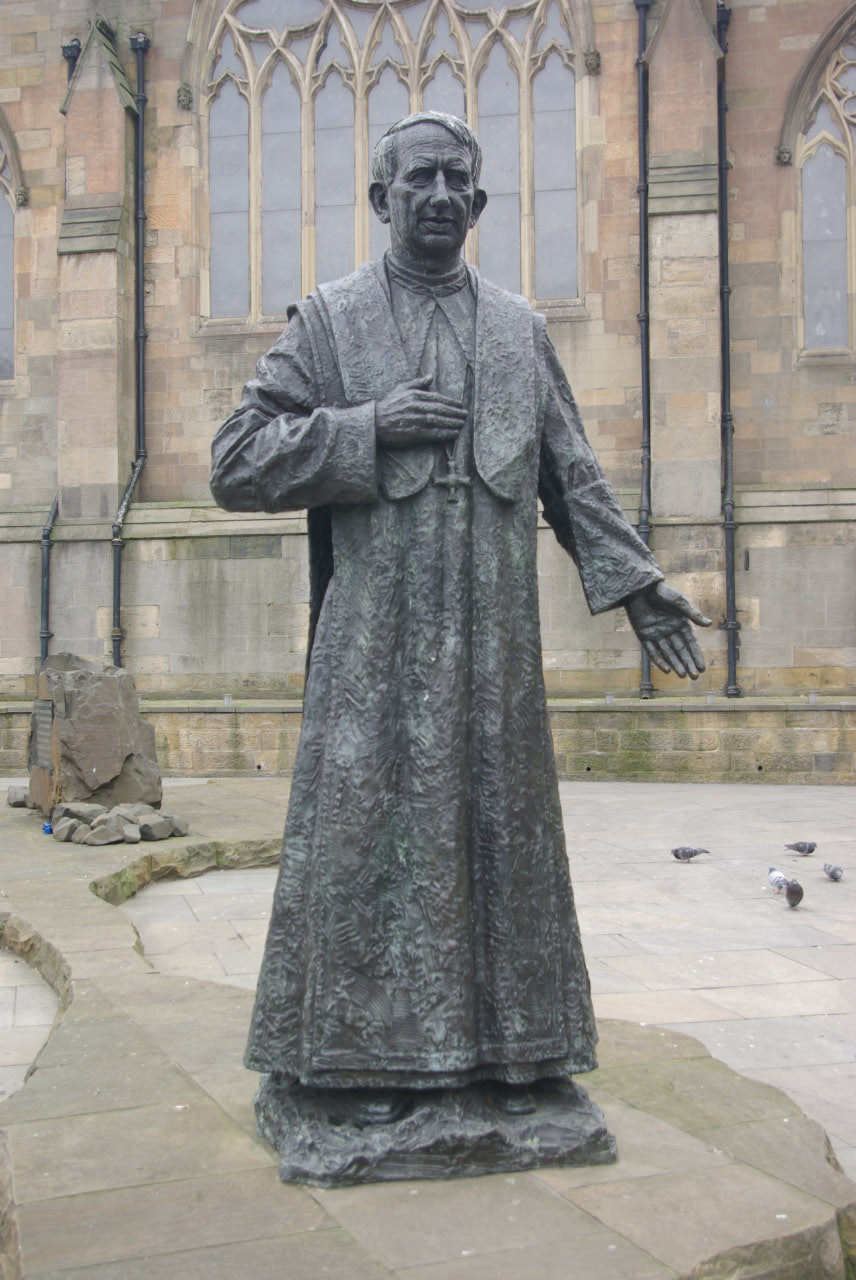
- Hume's statue in Newcastle
- Church: Roman Catholic Church
- Province: Westminster
- Appointed: 9 February 1976
- Installed: 25 March 1976
- Term ended: 17 June 1999
- Predecessor: John Carmel Heenan
- Successor: Cormac Murphy-O'Connor
- Other post: Cardinal Priest of San Silvestro in Capite
- Previous post: Abbot of Saint Lawrence's Abbey, Ampleforth (1963–1976)

Orders
- Ordination: 23 July 1950 by Thomas Shine
- Consecration: 26 March 1976 by Bruno Heim
- Created cardinal: 24 May 1976 by Paul VI
- Rank: Cardinal priest

Personal details
- Born: George Haliburton Hume; 2 March 1923 Newcastle upon Tyne, England
- Died: 17 June 1999 (aged 76) London, England
- Buried: Chapel of St Gregory and St Augustine, Westminster Cathedral, London
- Denomination: Roman Catholic
- Parents: William Errington Hume; Maria Elizabeth Hume (née Tisserye)
- Coat of arms

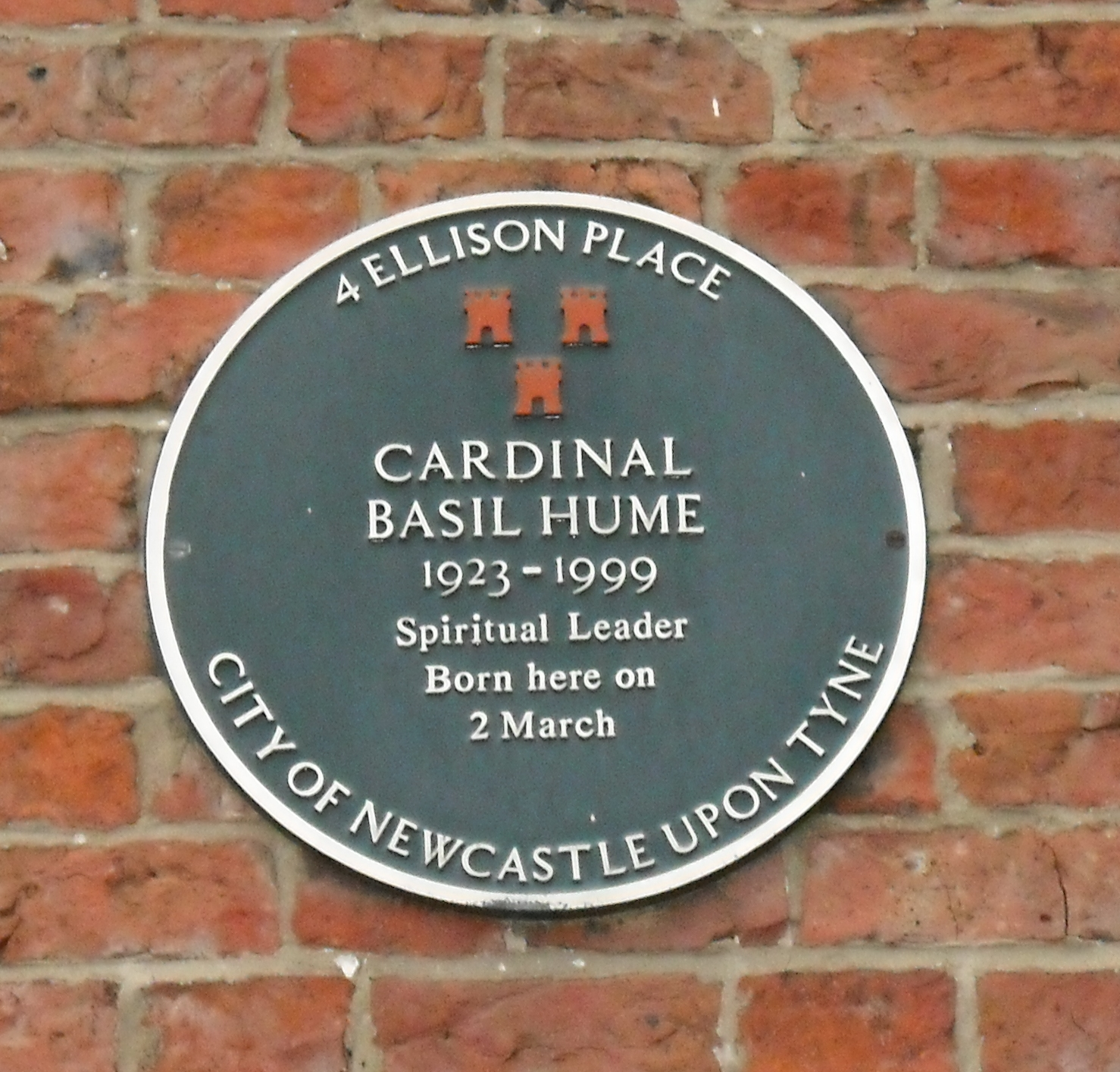
Memorial plaque at Hume's birthplace, 4 Ellison Place, Newcastle upon Tyne

George Basil Hume (born George Haliburton Hume; 2 March 1923 – 17 June 1999) was an English Catholic prelate who served as Archbishop of Westminster from 1976 until his death in 1999. A member of the Benedictines, he was made a cardinal in 1977.

Hume served as abbot of Ampleforth Abbey for 13 years until his appointment as an archbishop. From 1979, Hume served as president of the Catholic Bishops' Conference of England and Wales. He held these appointments until his death from cancer in 1999. His final resting place is at Westminster Cathedral in the Chapel of St Gregory and St Augustine.

During his lifetime, Hume received wide respect from the general public beyond the Catholic community. Following his death, a statue of him in his monastic habit and wearing his abbatial cross was erected in his home town of Newcastle upon Tyne outside St Mary's Cathedral (opposite Newcastle station); it was unveiled by Queen Elizabeth II.

Hume is believed to have covered up child abuse during his time at Ampleforth College. The school has been subject to reports of an extreme and widespread culture of sexual abuse of children as young as 11. Hume died before he could be called for evidence to the related public inquiry.

== Early life and ministry ==
Hume was born George Haliburton Hume at 4 Ellison Place in Newcastle upon Tyne in 1923, to Sir William Errington Hume (1879–1960) and Marie Elizabeth (née Tisseyre) Hume (d. 1979). His father was a Protestant and a cardiac physician from Scotland, and his mother the French Catholic daughter of an army officer. He had three sisters and one brother.

Hume was a pupil at the independent school Ampleforth College between the ages of 13 and 18. After finishing his studies there, he entered the novitiate of the Benedictine monastery at Ampleforth Abbey in North Yorkshire in 1941, at the age of 18. He received the habit and the monastic name of "Basil". He was solemnly professed in 1945.

After Ampleforth, Hume went on to study at St Benet's Hall, Oxford, a Benedictine institution, where he graduated with a Bachelor of Arts in modern history. As it was impossible to study Catholic theology at Oxford at the time, he went to the University of Fribourg, Switzerland, to complete his theological studies, earning a Licence in Sacred Theology.

Hume was ordained a priest on 23 July 1950. He then returned to Ampleforth to teach religious education, history, French and German. He served as head of the school's Department of Modern Languages before becoming the abbot of Ampleforth in 1963. During his time at Ampleforth, while serving as a French teacher, he taught Michael Whitehall.

Hume was a lifelong fan of jogging, squash and Newcastle United F.C. He once described getting an autograph from Jackie Milburn, the Newcastle United legend, as one of his "proudest achievements".

== Archbishop ==
On 9 February 1976, Hume was appointed Archbishop of Westminster, the highest ranking prelate in the Catholic Church in England and Wales, by Pope Paul VI. He was not considered the most obvious choice for the post of archbishop as he had lacked visible pastoral experience of running a diocese and, as the first monk to hold the post since the 1850 restoration of the English hierarchy, he was seen to be something of an outsider. Receiving news of the appointment during dinner, Hume later remarked, "I must confess I did not enjoy the rest of the meal."

Hume received his episcopal consecration on the following 25 March (the feast of the Annunciation) from Archbishop Bruno Heim at Westminster Cathedral. Bishops Basil Butler OSB and John McClean served as co-consecrators.

== Cardinal ==
Styles of Basil Hume
- Reference style: His Eminence
- Spoken style: Your Eminence
- Informal style: Cardinal

Hume was created Cardinal-Priest of San Silvestro in Capite by Paul VI in the consistory of 24 May 1976. He was one of the cardinal electors in the conclaves of August and October 1978. He was considered by many the most "papabile" Englishman since Cardinal Reginald Pole in 1548–1550.

Early in his time as archbishop, Hume found himself involved in the 1981 Irish hunger strike. He visited Derry in April 1981 and stated in a letter to Edward Daly, the Bishop of Derry, that "a hunger strike to death is a form of violence to one's self and violence leads to violence". After the death of Bobby Sands in May 1981, debate over the moral aspects of the strike in The Tablet and whether or not it constituted suicide took place. Following the deaths of Patsy O'Hara and Raymond McCreesh later that month, Cardinal Tomás Ó Fiaich asked the British government to acquiesce to the hunger strikers' basic demands, seeking to focus more on the question of injustice leading to such an event, while the English Catholic Church preferred to focus on the question of suicide more heavily.

Even after becoming an archbishop, Hume never ceased to see himself as a Benedictine monk first and to interpret his duties in the light of those of a Benedictine abbot: "He must hate faults but love the brothers." (Rule of St Benedict, ch. 64:11).

Hume was seen as moderate in his theological positions, trying to please both liberals and conservatives. While condemning homosexual acts, for instance, he accepted the validity of love between gay people. Moreover, he was opposed to women priests but described most detractors of Humanae vitae as "good, conscientious and faithful". Despite that comment, Hume supported Humanae vitae and regretted that the British government would rely on using condoms to address AIDS.

Hume's time in office saw Catholicism become more accepted in British society than it had been for 400 years, culminating in the first visit of Queen Elizabeth II to Westminster Cathedral in 1995. He had previously read the Epistle at the enthronement of Robert Runcie as Archbishop of Canterbury in 1980. It was also during his tenure in Westminster that Pope John Paul II made a historic visit to England in 1982.

In 1998, Hume asked John Paul II for permission to retire, expressing the wish to return to Ampleforth and devote his last years to peace and solitude, fly fishing and following his beloved Newcastle United Football Club. The request was refused.

In April 1999, Hume revealed that he had terminal cancer. On 2 June of that year, Queen Elizabeth appointed him to the Order of Merit. He died just over two weeks later, 17 June, in Westminster, London, at age 76. After a funeral service broadcast live on national television, he was buried in Westminster Cathedral. John Paul II, in his message of condolence to the Church in England and Wales, praised Hume as a "shepherd of great spiritual and moral character".

Hume was the last Archbishop of Westminster to employ a gentiluomo. The gentiluomo were a form of ceremonial bodyguard who accompanied the archbishops on formal occasions. As the role had become archaic, no new gentiluomo were appointed after the death of Hume's gentiluomo, Anthony Bartlett, in 2001.

Hume was accused of "hushing up" a suspected sexual abuse scandal at Ampleforth College by not calling in the police when he received a complaint from parents in 1975 about Father Piers Grant-Ferris, the son of a Tory peer, at Gilling Castle Prep (now St Martin's Ampleforth). In 2005, Grant-Ferris admitted 20 incidents of child abuse. This was not an isolated incident and involved other monks and lay members. In 2005, The Yorkshire Post reported: "Pupils at a leading Roman Catholic school suffered decades of abuse from at least six paedophiles following a decision by former Abbot Basil Hume not to call in police at the beginning of the scandal."

In 1984, Hume nominated Jimmy Savile as a member of the Athenaeum, a gentlemen's club in London's Pall Mall. Following the posthumous revelation of Savile's repeated sexual abuse of minors, members of the club criticised Hume's nomination of him for causing embarrassment to the club.

== Legacy ==
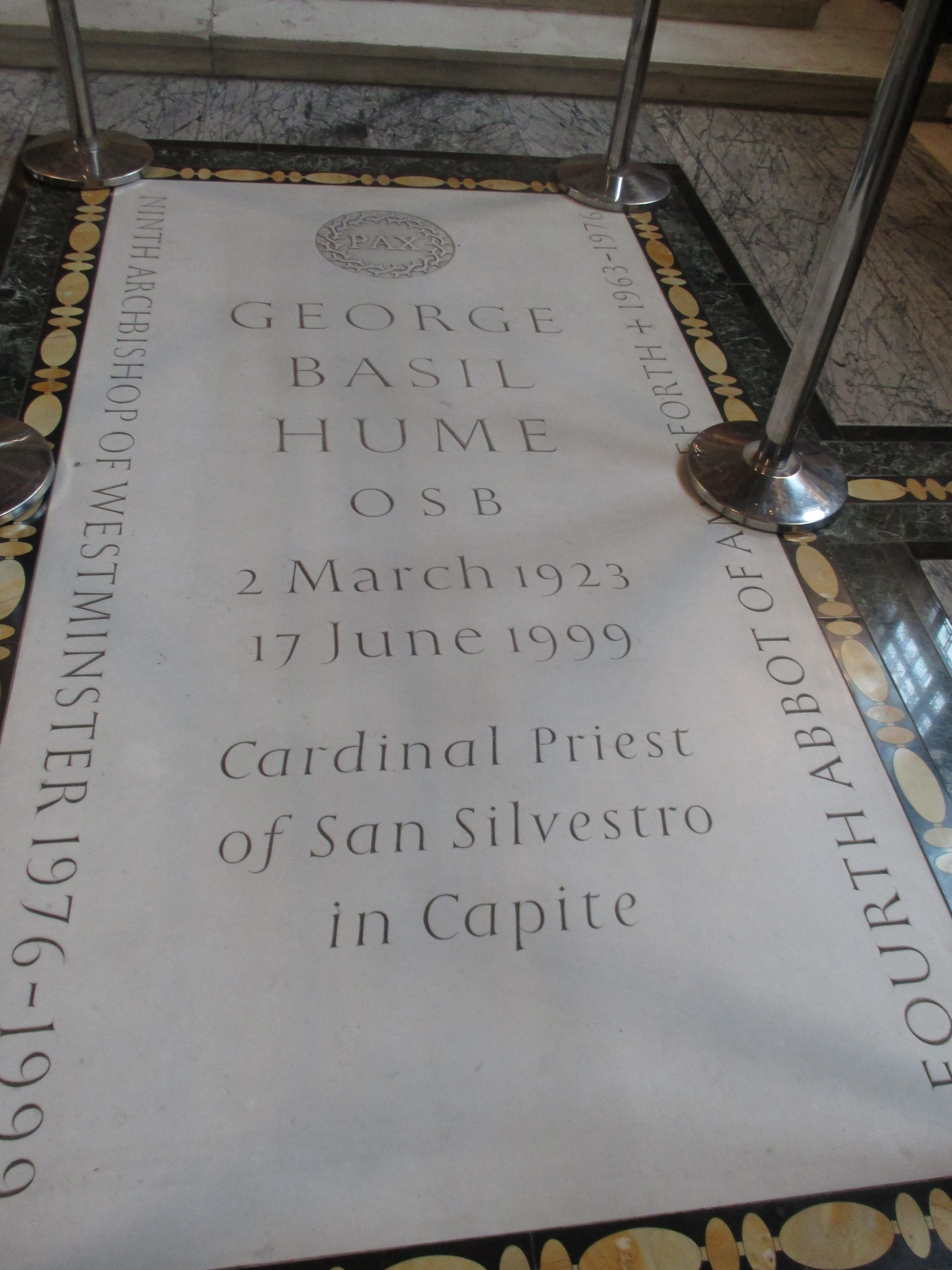
Hume's tomb in Westminster Cathedral

Hume was regularly named Britain's most popular religious figure in opinion polls and this was attributed by some to the great humility and warmth with which he treated everyone he met, regardless of their religion or background.

- A statue of Hume was erected in his home town of Newcastle and unveiled by the Queen in 2002.
- The Cardinal Hume Centre based in Westminster works to improve the lives of homeless young people, families and other vulnerable and socially excluded members of society.
- The Cardinal Hume Rose is named after him.
- Cardinal Hume Catholic School has been opened in Beacon Lough, part of Gateshead, Tyne and Wear. It replaces the ageing St Edmund Campion School and accommodates over 1,000 students.
- The Hume Theatre of St Mary's Catholic School, Bishop's Stortford, is named after him. He opened it a few years before he died.
- The Hume building of St Mary's Menston Catholic Voluntary Academy in West Yorkshire, opened in 2001, is named after him.
- The Basil Hume Scholarship is a set of scholarships awarded to new pupils at Ampleforth College.

== Writings ==
- Hume, Basil (1997), Basil in Blunderland, London: Darton, Longman and Todd, ISBN 0-232-52242-1
- Hume, Basil (1980), Cardinal John Henry Newman: A saint for our time? (1st ed.), London: Guild of Our Lady of Ransom, OCLC 1039148460.

He also wrote To Be a Pilgrim, Searching for God, The Mystery of Love and Footprints of the Northern Saints.

== Orders, medals and decorations ==
=== National orders ===
- United Kingdom: Order of Merit

=== Foreign orders ===
- Sovereign Military Order of Malta: Order pro merito Melitensi

=== Other ===
- Member of the Athenaeum Club, London
- Order of Saint Lazarus

== See also ==
- Anthony Howard, author of Basil Hume, the Monk Cardinal, Headline, 2005 (ISBN 0-7553-1247-3).

Catholic Church titles
Preceded by Herbert Byrne	Abbot of Ampleforth; 1963–1976	Succeeded by Ambrose Griffiths
Preceded by John Heenan	Archbishop of Westminster; 1976–1999	Succeeded by Cormac Murphy-O'Connor
Preceded by John Heenan	Cardinal Priest of S. Silvestro in Capite; 1976–1999	Succeeded by Desmond Connell
