= John Crowley (bishop) =

British Catholic bishop (born 1941)

John Patrick Crowley
- Bishop Emeritus of Middlesbrough
- Church: Catholic Church
- Diocese: Diocese of Middlesbrough
- In office: 3 November 1992 – 3 May 2007
- Predecessor: Augustine Harris
- Successor: Terry Drainey
- Previous posts: Titular Bishop of Thala (1986-1992); Auxiliary Bishop of Westminster (1986-1992)

Orders
- Ordination: 12 June 1965 by John Heenan
- Consecration: 8 December 1986 by Basil Hume

Personal details
- Born: 23 June 1941 (age 84) Newbury, Berkshire, United Kingdom

Styles of John Crowley
- Reference style: The Right Reverend
- Spoken style: My Lord
- Religious style: Bishop

John Patrick Crowley (born 23 June 1941 in Newbury, England) is a retired Roman Catholic bishop of Diocese of Middlesbrough, England, who carries the honorary title of Bishop Emeritus.

He was ordained a priest in 1965, and, as secretary to Cardinal Basil Hume, was appointed an auxiliary bishop, as titular Bishop of Tala, for the Archdiocese of Westminster, in 1986. In this post he had particular oversight of the diocese's parishes in Central London. On 3 November 1992 he became the 6th Bishop of Middlesbrough.

Crowley delivered the homily at the requiem for Cardinal Hume in Westminster Cathedral in June 1999.

In June 2001 Crowley agreed to celebrate Mass at a service of thanksgiving for a 25-year homosexual partnership between two Catholics, but withdrew at the last minute after a telephone call from Cardinal Cormac Murphy-O'Connor, who reportedly asked him not to attend. There was further controversy in 2005 when, during a radio interview, Crowley expressed the hope that married priests might be allowed in the Church within his lifetime.

His resignation from his post ten years before the customary date, which he said was due to the toll of pressures of leadership in a particularly challenging era for the Church, was accepted by the Holy See in accordance with canon 401 para. 2 of the 1983 Code of Canon Law ("because of illness or some other grave reason") in May 2007.

As of 2012 he was based in the parish of Our Lady of Lourdes, in Wanstead, London

Catholic Church titles
Preceded by Augustine Harris	Bishop of Middlesbrough; 1992–2007	Succeeded by Terry Drainey
