= St Joseph and St Francis Xavier Church =

Coordinates: 54.4041°N 1.7423°W

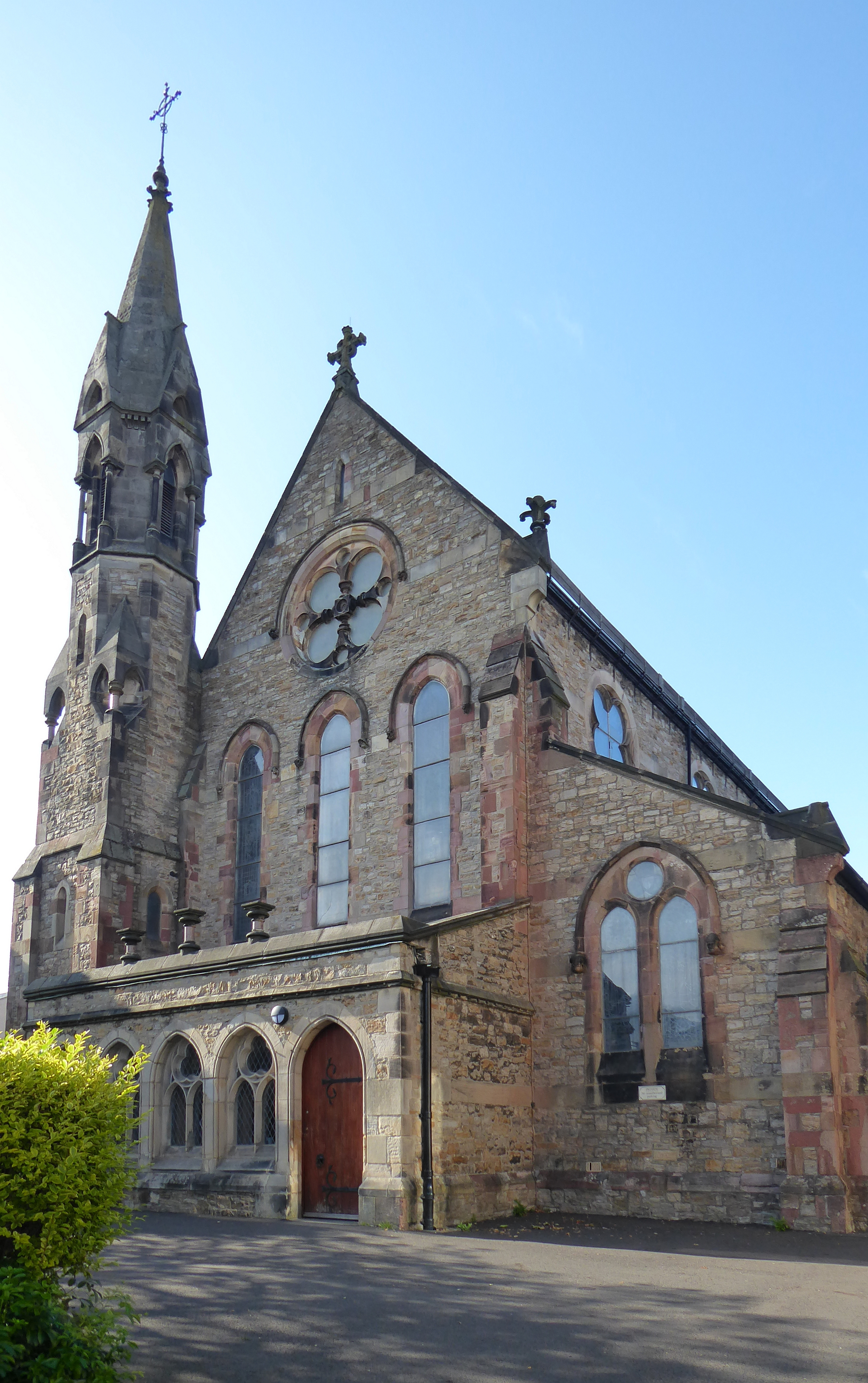
- Church entrance

- Location in the Yorkshire Dales
- OS grid reference: NZ 16825 00986
- Location: Richmond, North Yorkshire
- Country: England
- Denomination: Roman Catholic
- Website: StJosephSFX.co.uk

History
- Status: Parish church
- Founder: Society of Jesus
- Dedication: Saint Joseph; Saint Francis Xavier

Architecture
- Functional status: Active
- Heritage designation: Grade II listed
- Designated: 19 January 1993
- Architect: George Goldie
- Style: Gothic Revival
- Completed: 1868; 158 years ago

Administration
- Province: Liverpool
- Diocese: Middlesbrough
- Deanery: Northern

Clergy
- Bishop: Rt. Rev. Terence Drainey
- Priest: Canon Michael Loughlin

St Joseph and St Francis Xavier Church is a Roman Catholic Parish church in Richmond, North Yorkshire. It is situated between Newbiggin and Victoria Road to the south of Richmondshire Cricket Club. The church was built in 1868 and was designed by George Goldie. It was founded by the Society of Jesus and it is a Grade II listed building.

== History ==
=== Foundation ===
In 1794, Fr Thomas Austin Lawson OSB from Downside Abbey came to Richmond to start a mission to the local Catholics of the area. After twenty years of serving the Catholic community, Lawson was recalled to the monastery in 1814 and died there that year.

The Jesuits took over the mission and sent Fr Robert Johnson SJ. He served the congregation for fifty years and died in 1865. In 1888, a memorial window to him was installed in the church.

=== Construction ===
In 1866, he was succeeded by Fr William Strickland SJ who saw that the small chapel Lawson and Johnson had used was too small for the growing congregation. He asked the architect George Goldie to design a church that would accommodate the community.

In 1868, the church was completed and opened. However, the construction of the church and the nearby school, which became the parish hall, created a sizeable debt for the parish.

=== Administration ===
In 1961, a year before the Second Vatican Council, the Jesuits handed over the administration of the parish to the Diocese of Middlesbrough. The last Jesuit priest there was Fr Edmund Swift SJ. The diocese has continued to serve the parish ever since.

== Parish ==
=== Mass times ===
St Joseph and St Francis Xavier Church has two Masses every Sunday, one at 18:30 on Saturday evening and the other at 09:30 on Sunday morning. There are also weekday Masses at 09:30 from Monday through to Saturday. At St Mary's Wycliffe, within the parish, there is a Sunday Mass at 11:30, and weekday communion services at 09:00 from Monday to Friday, with one at 10:00 on Saturdays.

=== St Mary's Church ===
The parish priest also serves St Mary's Church in Wycliffe, County Durham, situated close to Barnard Castle and Hutton Magna. It was built in 1848-49 as a chapel for Wycliffe Hall. The church is now part of a retreat centre, St Mary's Centre.

== See also ==
- Society of Jesus
- Listed buildings in Richmond, North Yorkshire
