= David Hogan =

David Hogan may refer to:

- Dave Hogan (born 1989), English football goalkeeper
- David Hogan (composer) (1949–1996), American composer and musical director of CIGAP
- David Hogan (snooker player) (born 1988), Irish professional snooker player
- David Hogan, pseudonym of Frank Gallagher, Irish author
- David Hogan (priest), Roman Catholic priest
