= St Clare of Assisi, Middlesbrough =

Roman Catholic Church in Middlesbrough, England

St Clare of Assisi Church
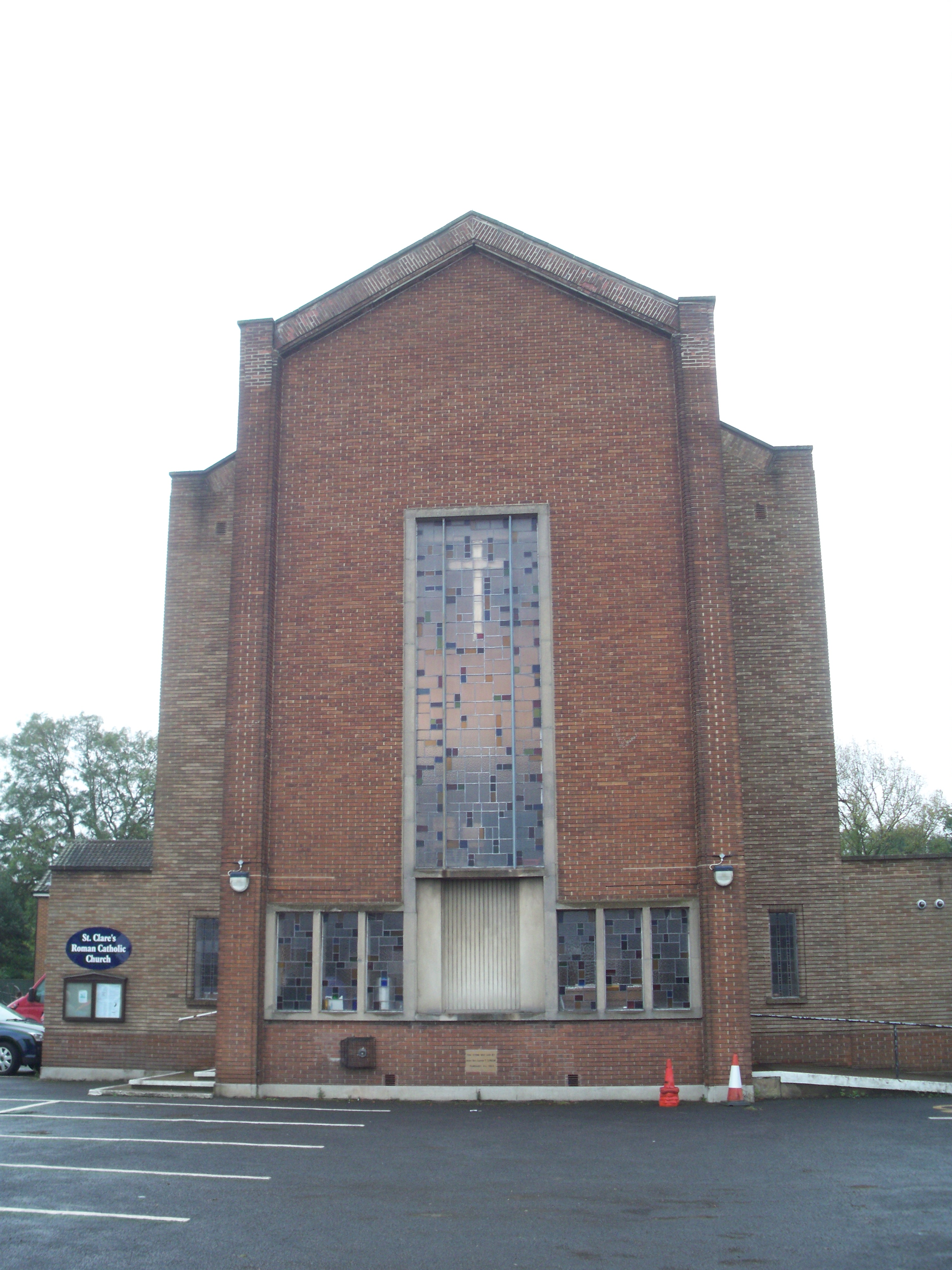
- St Clare of Assisi Church
- 54.530°N 1.248°W
- OS grid reference: NZ 18507 00307
- Location: Middlesbrough
- Country: England
- Denomination: Roman Catholic
- Website: Official website

History
- Status: Church building
- Dedication: Clare of Assisi

Architecture
- Functional status: Active
- Architect: Thomas A. Crawford
- Style: Modernist architecture
- Groundbreaking: 1964
- Completed: 11 February 1965

Administration
- Province: Liverpool
- Diocese: Middlesbrough
- Deanery: Northern
- Parish: St Francis

St Clare's, Middlesbrough is a Roman Catholic church in the Brookfield area of Middlesbrough, England. It was built in 1965 and is located close to the junction of the A19 and the A174.

== History ==
=== Construction ===
The Church of St Clare Of Assisi was built from 1964 to 1965. It was originally part of the parish of St Francis of Assisi. It cost £35,000 and was designed by Thomas A. Crawford. On 11 February 1965 it was opened by the coadjutor Bishop of Middlesbrough Gordon Wheeler.

=== Developments ===
The church is of a fairly large size and of a typical design for churches built in the 1960s. The church was re-ordered after the Second Vatican Council, resulting in the tabernacle being moved to a separate Blessed Sacrament chapel in the church.

== Parish ==
In 1967, the parish of St Francis of Assisi, centred in Acklam, Middlesbrough, was divided and St Clare's became a separate parish. This was caused by the greatly increased quantity of housing built in the locality and the consequent increased population. In 2013, it reverted from being a parish church to being again within the parish of St Francis of Assisi. It has one Sunday Mass at 9 am.

== See also ==
- Diocese of Middlesbrough
