= Ss Mary and Romuald, Yarm =

Catholic parish church in England

St Mary and St Romuald
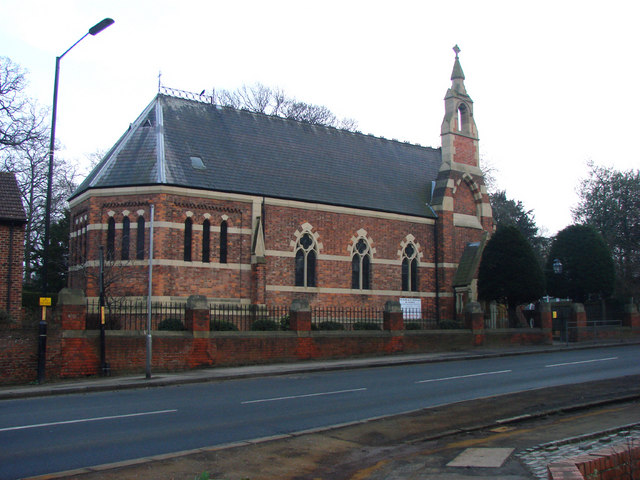
- St Mary and St Romuald
- 54.50710°N 1.35365°W
- Denomination: Catholic Church
- Churchmanship: Latin Church
- Website: Ss Mary and Romuald

History
- Dedication: Blessed Virgin Mary, St Romuald

Administration
- Province: Liverpool
- Diocese: Middlesbrough

Clergy
- Priest(s): Rev. Neil McNicholas (2015-2023); Very Rev. Canon Alan Sheridan (2023-)

St Mary and St Romuald is a Catholic parish church in Yarm, North Yorkshire, England. Administratively, it is part of the Diocese of Middlesbrough.

== History ==
The Church of St. Mary and St. Romuald is located on land that was at one time attached to the Black Friars monastery, which was founded at Yarm in 1260.

The parish originated as a domestic chaplaincy to the Meynell family. In 1860, the parish received its own free-standing church, a gift from Thomas Meynell to his wife. The church is dedicated to Our Lady of York, Mother of Mercy, and St. Romuald, abbot and monastic founder. St. Romuald was born in Ravenna, a favourite resort of the Meynells.

Between 2015 and 2023 the parish priest was Fr. Neil McNicholas (1948-2025), the author of several books on Catholicism.

The current parish priest is the Very Rev. Canon Alan Sheridan.

== Architecture ==
The church was designed by Hadfield & Goldie of Sheffield. It is constructed of red brick with a slate roof, and is "a well-detailed example of the use of structural polychromatic brickwork, popular in the 1860s".

The East window was designed by John Hardman Powell of Hardman & Co.

The church is a Grade II listed building, as it "represents a relatively early and little altered church" by the Catholic architect George Goldie.
