= Our Lady and St Peter's Church, Bridlington =

Our Lady and St Peter's Church
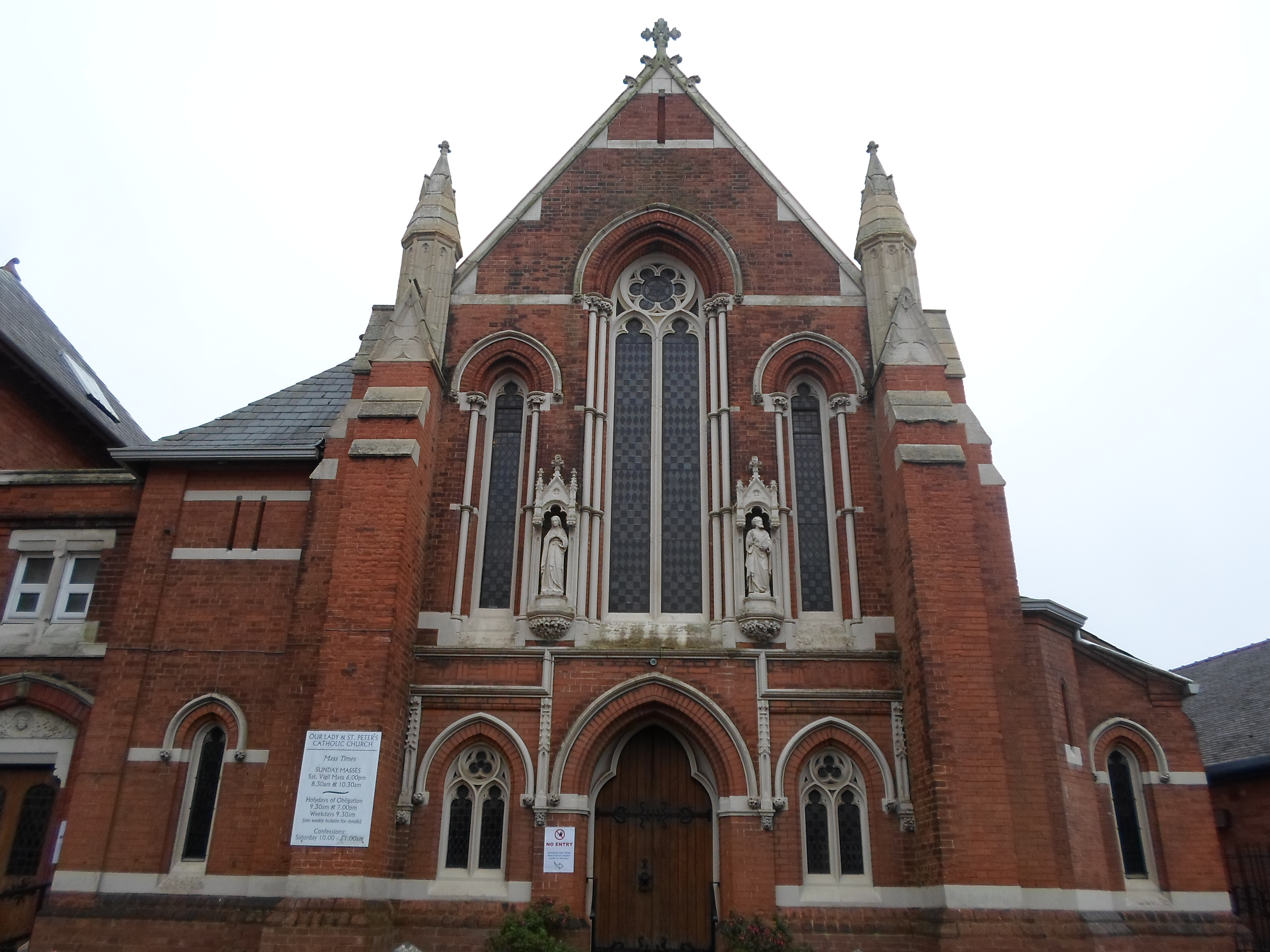
- Our Lady and St Peter's Church
- 54.0863°N 0.1927°W
- OS grid reference: TA 18310 67109
- Location: Bridlington
- Country: England
- Denomination: Roman Catholic
- Website: OurLadyandStPeterBridlington.com

History
- Status: Parish church
- Founder: Fr James Clancy
- Dedication: Mary, mother of Jesus, Saint Peter

Architecture
- Functional status: Active
- Heritage designation: Grade II listed
- Designated: 18 November 2015
- Architect(s): Smith, Brodrick & Lowther
- Style: Gothic Revival
- Groundbreaking: 19 August 1893
- Completed: 1 September 1894

Administration
- Province: Liverpool
- Diocese: Middlesbrough
- Deanery: Southern
- Parish: Our Lady Star of the Sea

Our Lady and St Peter's Church is a Roman Catholic parish church in Bridlington, East Riding of Yorkshire, England. It was built from 1893 to 1894 in the Gothic Revival style. It is located on the corner of Victoria Road and Wycliffe Lane, close to the town centre. It is a Grade II listed building.

== History ==
=== Foundation ===
In 1791, a mission was started in Beverley. In 1846, a church was built there. In 1855, priests from Beverley came to Bridlington to serve the local Catholic population. Mass was celebrated privately in Bridlington in people's homes. In 1867, a room as rented in the Victoria Rooms on Garrison Street by a Fr Henry Green to become St William's Chapel. In 1868, it was recorded that there were 35 Catholics in Bridlington. In 1884, a Fr John Murphy became the priest in Bridlington. He was behind the building of a tin tabernacle church on Prospect Row, which became Wellington Road.

=== Construction ===
In 1886, Fr John Murphy's replacement priest, Dr James Glancy bought the site of the current church. The architectural firm Smith, Brodrick & Lowther, from Hull, comprising Richard George Smith, Frederick Stead Broderick and Arthur Randall Lowther, were commissioned to design the church. On 19 August 1893, the foundation stone was laid. On 1 September 1894, the church was opened. The total cost of the church was £1,870 and it was paid for by Mrs Caroline Mousley of the Boynton baronets. From 1895, Dominican sisters ran a school in the parish.

== Architecture ==
The church is built of red brick, with stone dressings and a Welsh slate roof with terracotta cresting. It consists of a nave with aisles, and a chancel with side chapels. Flanking the entrance are buttresses rising to stone pinnacles, and between these are a stone coped gable with a cross finial. The doorway and flanking windows have pointed arches, and above them are three tall windows and two statues under canopies. On the left is a porch linking the church to the presbytery. This has two storeys and two bays, the left bay forming a wide two-storey bay window. To the right is a doorway with an elaborate pointed and crocketed hood mould. Also attached to the church is a 20th-century church hall.

Inside, the north bay has a choir and organ gallery, and there are assorted stained glass windows. The marble altar with a tabernacle and reredos was brought from St Patrick's Church, Middlesbrough.

== Parish ==
Our Lady and St Peter's Church is in the Our Lady Star of the Sea parishes along with St George's Church in Eastfield and St Mary's Church in Filey. Our Lady and St Peter's Church has two Sunday Masses at 6:00pm on Saturday and 9:00am on Sunday. St George's Church in Eastfield has one Sunday Mass at 4:00pm on Saturday and St Mary's Church in Filey has one Sunday Mass at 11:00am.

== See also ==
- Diocese of Middlesbrough
- Listed buildings in Bridlington (Quay area)
- Media related to Our Lady and St Peter's Church, Bridlington at Wikimedia Commons
