= David Hogan (priest) =

Roman Catholic priest

The Right Reverend Monsignor David Hogan is a Roman Catholic priest in the parish of St Bernadette's, Nunthorpe in the Diocese of Middlesbrough, England. He is also a canon lawyer and a Knight of the Order of the Holy Sepulchre.
