= St. David School =

St. David School may refer to:

In the United States:

- St. David School (Richmond)
- St. David School (Willow Grove, PA)
- Saint David's School (New York City)

In Canada:

- St. David Catholic Secondary School (Waterloo)

== See also ==
- St. David's School (disambiguation)
