= Richard Lacy =

Irish-born prelate

- Bishop of Middlesbrough
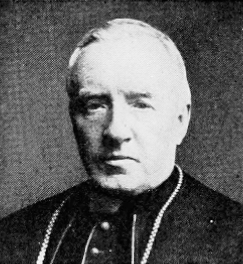
- Church: Catholic Church
- Diocese: Diocese of Middlesbrough
- In office: 2 December 1879 – 11 April 1929
- Predecessor: Diocese erected
- Successor: Thomas Shine

Orders
- Ordination: 21 December 1867
- Consecration: 18 December 1879 by Henry Edward Manning

Personal details
- Born: 16 January 1841 Navan, County Meath, United Kingdom of Great Britain and Ireland
- Died: 11 April 1929 (aged 88) Middlesbrough, Yorkshire, United Kingdom

Richard Lacy (16 January 1841 – 11 April 1929) was an Irish-born prelate of the Roman Catholic Church. He served as the first Bishop of Middlesbrough from 1879 to 1929.

== Biography ==
Born in Navan, County Meath, Ireland on 16 January 1841, he was ordained to the priesthood on 21 December 1867. He was appointed the Bishop of the Diocese of Middlesbrough by the Holy See on 12 September 1879. His consecration to the Episcopate took place on 18 December 1879, the principal consecrator was Cardinal Henry Edward Manning, Archbishop of Westminster, and the principal co-consecrators were Bishop Robert Cornthwaite of Leeds and Bishop Bernard O'Reilly of Liverpool.

He died in office in Middlesbrough on 11 April 1929, aged 88.

Catholic Church titles
New title	Bishop of Middlesbrough; 1879–1929	Succeeded by Thomas Shine
