= Lamus (see) =

Lamus was a city and an episcopal see in the Roman province of Isauria. The see is included in the Catholic Church's list of titular sees. The harbour of the city was at the town of Charadros (the Latin form of which is Charadrus), a name that has also been used for the see.

== Site ==
The city of Lamus was situated on the double summit of a high hill overlooking the modern village of Adanda and about 600 metres (2,000 ft) above sea level. The ruins include a gate, adorned with an inscription dedicated to Gallienus (emperor from 253 to 260) and a relief of an eagle above an ox's head, and a temple of Vespasian and his son Titus.

There are scarcely any ancient remains of the harbour town of Charadros, now Kalediran.

== Bishops of the residential see ==
In his Oriens Christianus, Michel Lequien mentions the ecclesia Lami et Charadri (church of Lamus and Charadrus), giving the names of two of its bishops:

- Nunechius took part in the Council of Chalcedon in 451, where he is referred to as Bishop of Charadrus. He signed, as "Bishop of Lamus and Charadrus" the letter that the bishops of Isauria sent in 458 to Leo I the Thracian.
- Eustathius signed the acts of the Second Council of Nicaea as "ἀνάξιος ἐπίσκοπος Λάμου" (unworthy bishop of Lamus).

== Bishops of the titular see ==
Titular Bishops of Charadrus

- Pierre Trenchant, M.E.P. (1802-1806)
- Francisco de la Concepción Ramírez y González, O.F.M. (1861-1869)
- John Leonard (1872-1908)
- nl:Michael Antonius Maria Vuylsteke, O.P. (1910-1930)

Titular Bishops of Lamus

- John McIntyre (1912-1917)
- Thomas Shine (1921-1929)
- Henricus Lamiroy (1929-1931)
- Edward Myers(1932-1951)
- Sisto Mazzoldi, M.C.C.I. (1951-1967)
