= St Bernadette's, Nunthorpe =

Church in North Yorkshire, England

Coordinates: 54.531°N 1.182°W

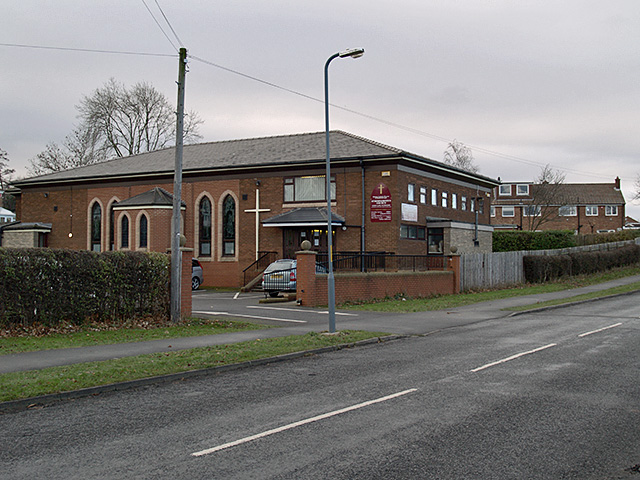

The parish church of St Bernadette is a Roman Catholic Church in Nunthorpe in the Diocese of Middlesbrough.

The parish priest is Canon John Lumley. Monsignor David Hogan also serves in the parish.
