= St John of Beverley Church, Beverley =

St John of Beverley Church
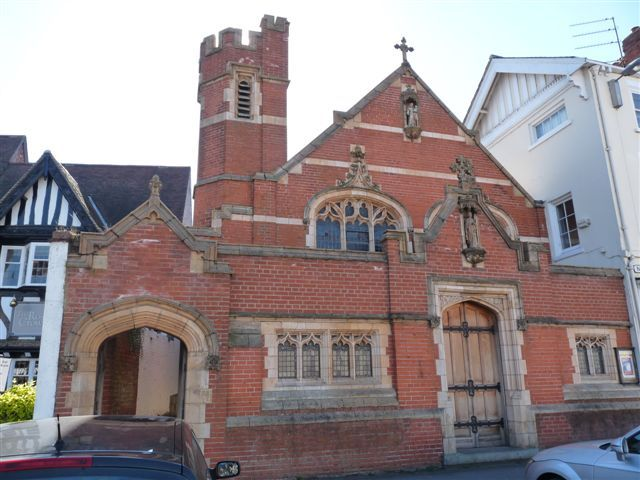
- St John of Beverley Church
- 53.8451°N 0.4368°W
- OS grid reference: TA 02945 39899
- Location: Beverley
- Country: England
- Denomination: Roman Catholic
- Website: StJohnattheBar.com

History
- Status: Parish church
- Dedication: John of Beverley

Architecture
- Functional status: Active
- Heritage designation: Grade II listed
- Designated: 30 June 1987
- Architect(s): Smith, Brodrick & Lowther
- Style: Gothic Revival
- Groundbreaking: 1897
- Completed: 1898
- Construction cost: £1,560

Administration
- Province: Liverpool
- Diocese: Middlesbrough
- Deanery: Southern
- Parish: St John of Beverley

St John of Beverley Church is a Roman Catholic parish church in Beverley, East Riding of Yorkshire, England. It was built from 1897 to 1898 in the Gothic revival style. It is located on the corner of York Street and the North Bar in the centre of the town. It is a Grade II listed building.

== History ==
=== Foundation ===
In 1791, a Catholic chapel was built in Beverley. In 1846, a church was built. It was the first Catholic church to be built in Beverley since the Reformation. From there, priests would go out to serve the local Catholic population in places such as Bridlington. A school and a presbytery were built next to the church.

=== Construction ===
From 1897 to 1898, the current church was built. It was designed by the architectural firm of Smith, Brodrick & Lowther from Hull, comprising Richard George Smith, Frederick Stead Broderick and Arthur Randall Lowther, who also designed Our Lady and St Peter's Church in Bridlington. The total cost of the church came to £1,560 and it was paid by Lady Sykes of Sledmere House, wife of Sir Tatton Sykes, 5th Baronet and mother of Mark Sykes.

== Parish ==
The priest at St John of Beverley Church also serves the surrounding parishes of Sacred Heart Church in Hornsea and Most Holy Sacrament Church in Marton. St John of Beverley Church has two Sunday Masses at 6:30pm on Saturday and at 10:45am on Sunday.

== Interior ==
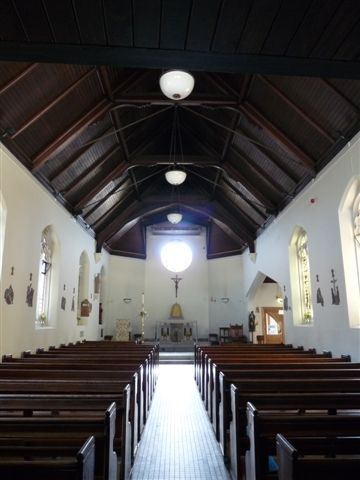
Interior

== See also ==
- Media related to St John of Beverley Church, Beverley at Wikimedia Commons
- Diocese of Middlesbrough
- Listed buildings in Beverley (north area)
