= George Brunner (bishop) =

English prelate (1889-1969)

- Bishop of Middlesbrough
- Church: Catholic Church
- Diocese: Diocese of Middlesbrough
- In office: 4 April 1956 – 13 June 1967
- Predecessor: Thomas Shine
- Successor: John McClean
- Other post: Titular Bishop of Murustaga (1967-1969)
- Previous posts: Titular Bishop of Elis (1946-1956); Auxiliary Bishop of Middlesbrough (1946-1956)

Orders
- Ordination: 9 April 1917
- Consecration: 25 July 1946 by William Godfrey

Personal details
- Born: 21 August 1889 Kingston upon Hull, Yorkshire, United Kingdom of Great Britain and Ireland
- Died: 21 March 1969 (aged 79) Middlesbrough, Yorkshire, United Kingdom

George Brunner (21 August 1889 – 21 March 1969) was an English prelate of the Roman Catholic Church. He served as the Bishop of Middlesbrough from 1955 to 1967.

Born in Kingston upon Hull, Yorkshire on 21 August 1889, he was ordained to the priesthood on 9 April 1917. He was appointed an Auxiliary Bishop of Middlesbrough and Titular Bishop of Elis on 22 June 1946. His consecration to the Episcopate took place on 25 July 1946, the principal consecrator was Cardinal William Godfrey, Archbishop of Westminster, and the principal co-consecrators were Bishop Thomas Shine of Middlesbrough and Bishop Henry Marshall of Salford. Following the death of Bishop Shine in 1955, Brunner was appointed the Bishop of the Diocese of Middlesbrough on 4 April 1956. He participated in the first two sessions of the Second Vatican Council, held between in 1962 and 1963.

He retired as Bishop of Middlesbrough on 13 June 1967 and appointed Titular Bishop of Murustaga. He died on 21 March 1969, aged 79.

Catholic Church titles
Preceded by Thomas Shine	Bishop of Middlesbrough; 1955–1967	Succeeded by John McClean
