= St David's College =

St David's College is the name of several colleges. Most St David's Colleges are named after Saint David, patron saint of Wales:

- St David's College, Lampeter, the original name of the University of Wales, Lampeter (now University of Wales, Trinity Saint David)
- St David's College, Llandudno, an independent day and boarding school in Llandudno, Wales
- St David's Catholic College, a Roman Catholic sixth form college in Cardiff, Wales

== See also ==
- St. David's School (disambiguation)
