= Augustine Harris =

- Bishop of Middlesbrough
- Church: Catholic Church
- Diocese: Diocese of Middlesbrough
- In office: 10 November 1978 – 3 November 1992
- Predecessor: John McClean
- Successor: John Crowley
- Previous posts: Titular Bishop of Socia (1965-1978); Auxiliary Bishop of Liverpool (1965-1978)

Orders
- Ordination: 30 May 1942 by Richard Downey
- Consecration: 11 February 1966 by George Beck

Personal details
- Born: 27 October 1917 West Derby, Liverpool, Merseyside, United Kingdom of Great Britain and Ireland
- Died: 30 August 2007 (aged 89) Crosby, Liverpool, Merseyside, United Kingdom

Styles of Augustine Harris
- Reference style: The Right Reverend
- Spoken style: Your Lordship
- Religious style: Monsignor

Bishop Augustine Harris (27 October 1917 – 30 August 2007) was a Roman Catholic Bishop of Middlesbrough and former Auxiliary Bishop of Liverpool.

Thomas Augustine Harris was born in West Derby, a suburb of Liverpool, and was educated at St. Cecilia's Primary School and St. Francis Xavier's College, both in Liverpool. In 1933, he went to the Liverpool Archdiocesan Seminary at St Joseph's College, Upholland (which is no longer in existence), to study for the priesthood. On 30 May 1942, he was ordained by Archbishop Downey.

After six months as a curate at St Oswald's Church, Old Swan, Liverpool, he then served at St Elizabeth's, Litherland (1943 to 1952), and then as Chaplain at Walton Prison. During his time at St Elizabeth's he had an active Y.C.W. group and was chaplain to the local Catholic Social Guild. He was the English representative to the International Council of Senior Roman Catholic Prison Chaplains from 1957 to 1966.

He was a member of the Vatican Delegation to the United Nations' Quinquennial Congress on Crime in London (1960) and Stockholm (1965). Throughout his life, Bishop Harris maintained a personal interest in criminology and published a number of articles in this field.

On 11 February 1966, Augustine Harris was consecrated Bishop of Socia and Auxiliary Bishop of Liverpool by Archbishop George Beck in the crypt of the then unfinished Metropolitan Cathedral. A few months later Archbishop Beck had a severe heart attack, so the new bishop had to carry the administration of the largest archdiocese in the country, and the preparations for the imminent opening of the Metropolitan Cathedral. Harris was the principal consecrator of the Cathedral during Archbishop Beck's infirmity. As the first Roman Catholic Cathedral to be built in the 20th century in England, the event attracted international importance; it was featured on European TV.

On 20 November 1978, Msgr. Harris was appointed as Bishop of Middlesbrough. It was Pope John Paul II's first episcopal appointment in the British Isles. Among his many projects in Middlesbrough diocese, Bishop Harris carried out a major reorganisation of Catholic schools and established four diocesan pastoral centres which have responsibility for assisting the renewal of parish community life. As Bishop, he produced pamphlets including This Decade is Forever for the Decade of Evangelisation, and Serve the Lord with Gladness (his own personal motto) as a reflection of his years in the priesthood.

Bishop Harris acted very much in the ecumenical spirit engendered by Vatican II. While in Liverpool there were instances of his approval of Catholic priests assisting at the baptism of children of mixed confessional identity in Anglican churches with the baptism then registered of parish churches of both confessions.

He consecrated Middlesbrough's Cathedral in 1998 which incorporated many of his suggestions to the architect on the church design. In 1980 he promoted a free monthly diocesan newspaper, The Catholic Voice, which, as of 2023, continues to be published and distributed.

Bishop Harris served as liaison Bishop between the Bishops' Conference of England and Wales and the Prison Department at the Home Office, was Episcopal Moderator to the Federation Internationale des Associations Medicales Catholiques (1967 to 1976), and was President of the Commission for Social Welfare (1972 to 1984). He was Episcopal Chairman of the Commission for Radio and Television, President of UNDA (the Catholic broadcasters' association) in England and Wales, and a member of CRAC, the religious advisory body for the IBA and BBC.

Bishop Harris had a variety of broadcasting experience, including a series of appearances for Terry Wogan's BBC Radio 2 programme in 1974. On 16 October 2003, he led a live broadcast of "Morning Worship" on BBC Radio 4 to celebrate the Silver Jubilee of Pope John Paul II. In May 2007 he recorded a special half-hour programme for BBC Radio Merseyside on the occasion of the fortieth anniversary of the Metropolitan Cathedral of Christ the King, Liverpool. He was Chairman of the Department for Christian Responsibility and Citizenship. In his retirement he continued to write a regular column in the Liverpool Catholic Pictorial.

In January 1992, Pope John Paul II accepted Bishop Harris's resignation, tendered in anticipation of his 75th birthday in October 1992 (75 is the statutory retirement age for bishops). The resignation was accepted and Bishop Harris remained in office until his successor, Bishop John Crowley, was appointed in November 1992.

In his retirement Bishop Harris returned to his native Liverpool where he continued to serve the Church and administer the sacraments. To celebrate the 40th anniversary of his ordination as bishop, on 11 February 2006, Bishop Harris concelebrated Mass with Bishop John Crowley, his successor in Middlesbrough, and Msgr. Ricardo Morgan, at the time the Vicar General of the Diocese of Middlesbrough, in the chapel at Ince Blundell Hall where he has resided for the past few years.

On 22 June 2006, the formal celebration of this event was held in the Liverpool's Metropolitan Cathedral where Bishop Harris was joined by Cardinal Cormac Murphy-O'Connor, as well as, the Papal Nuncio, and twenty bishops, along with priests and lay people from the Liverpool and Middlesbrough dioceses. The homily was preached on that occasion by Cardinal Murphy-O'Connor.

In retirement Harris lived in Formby, and later at Ince Blundell Hall, where he died on 30 August 2007, aged 89.

Catholic Church titles
Preceded by John Gerard McClean	Bishop of Middlesbrough; 1978–1992	Succeeded by John Crowley
