= John McClean (bishop) =

English prelate (1914-1978)

John Gerard McClean
- Bishop of Middlesbrough
- Church: Catholic Church
- Diocese: Diocese of Middlesbrough
- In office: 12 June 1967 – 27 August 1978
- Predecessor: George Brunner
- Successor: Augustine Harris
- Previous posts: Titular Bishop of Maxita (1966-1967); Coadjutor Bishop of Middlesbrough (1966-1967)

Orders
- Ordination: 22 March 1942
- Consecration: 24 February 1967 by George Brunner

Personal details
- Born: 24 September 1914 Redcar, North Yorkshire, United Kingdom of Great Britain and Ireland
- Died: 27 August 1978 (aged 63) Blackley, Manchester, Greater Manchester, United Kingdom

John Gerard McClean (24 September 1914 – 27 August 1978) was an English prelate of the Roman Catholic Church. He served as Bishop of Middlesbrough from 1967 to 1978.

Born in Redcar, Yorkshire on 24 September 1914, he was ordained to the priesthood on 22 March 1942. He was appointed Coadjutor Bishop of Middlesbrough and Titular Bishop of Maxita on 10 December 1966. His consecration to the Episcopate took place on 24 February 1967, the principal consecrator was Bishop George Brunner of Middlesbrough, and the principal co-consecrators were Bishop James Cunningham of Hexham and Newcastle and Bishop William Wheeler of Leeds. On Bishop Brunner's retirement, McClean automatically succeeded as the Bishop of the Diocese of Middlesbrough on 13 June 1967.

He died in office on 27 August 1978, aged 63.

Catholic Church titles
Preceded by George Brunner	Bishop of Middlesbrough; 1967–1978	Succeeded by Augustine Harris
