= Newlands School FCJ =

Newlands Catholic School FCJ

Location
- Saltersgill Avenue; Middlesbrough, North Yorkshire, TS4 3JW; England
- Coordinates: 54.54382°N 1.22944°W

Information
- Type: Voluntary aided school
- Motto: Fortiter Et Recte; Bravely and Justly
- Religious affiliation: Roman Catholic
- Closed: 31 August 2009
- Specialist: Maths and Computing College
- Headteacher: Stephen Wing
- Age: 11 to 16

Newlands Catholic School FCJ was a mixed 11–16 Catholic, state school in Middlesbrough, North Yorkshire, England. The school was awarded Specialist Maths and Computing College status.

It was owned by a religious order, the Faithful Companions of Jesus (FCJs) who originally came to Middlesbrough in the 19th century at the request of the Bishops. It was originally an all-girls school before it was amalgamated with St Mary's local boys school.

The school motto was Fortiter Et Recte, which in Latin means "Bravely and Justly".

In 2009, Newlands School was officially renamed as Trinity Catholic College after amalgamating with St. David's School, Middlesbrough.
