= St David's School, Middlesbrough =

St David's Roman Catholic Technology College

Location
- St Davids Way; Middlesbrough, North Yorkshire, TS5 7EY; England
- 54°32′26″N 1°15′01″W

Information
- Religious affiliation: Roman Catholic
- Closed: 2009
- Local authority: Middlesbrough
- Department for Education URN: 111765 Tables
- Ofsted: Reports
- Headteacher: Peter Coady
- Gender: Coeducational
- Age: 11 to 16
- Enrolment: 1,021
- Website: http://www.trinitycatholiccollege.middlesbrough.sch.uk

St David's School was a Roman Catholic Technology College in Acklam, Middlesbrough, North Yorkshire, England, specialising in Mathematics, Science, Technology (cooking, textiles, electronics and woodwork) and ICT. The school was awarded Technology College status in July 2002 and this was renewed for a further four years in 2007. It was also one of very few schools to offer a construction course.

The school opened in 1970 as St. George's then it was renamed in 1984 after the amalgamation with St Paul's School, which in turn had been an earlier amalgamation of St Thomas's and St Michael's schools. The last headmaster of St. Davids was Mr Peter Coady who replaced Mr Phillip Tucker. School subjects included Applied business, Art, Design, Technology, Drama, EAL (English as an Additional Language), English, Geography, History, ICT, Key Skills, Maths, Media Studies, Modern Languages, Music, PE, RE, Science, SEN (Special Education needs).

The school combined with Newlands School FCJ, also in Middlesbrough, in 2009 to form the biggest Roman Catholic School in North East England. The combined school is called Trinity Catholic College. In September 2011 the St David's site was closed down and all pupils transferred to the Newlands site, which is the site of the combined school.
