= St Patrick's Catholic College =

Coordinates: 54.5435°N 1.2921°W

Location
- Baysdale Road; Thornaby-on-Tees; North Yorkshire, TS17 9DE; England

Information
- Type: Academy
- Religious affiliation: Roman Catholic
- School district: Teesside
- Local authority: Stockton-on-Tees
- Trust: Nicholas Postgate Catholic Academy Trust
- Department for Education URN: 142281 Tables
- Ofsted: Reports
- Headteacher: Deborah Law
- Gender: Coeducational
- Age: 11 to 16
- Houses: Ampleforth, Clitherow, Postgate, Whitby
- Website: http://www.stpatricks.npcat.org.uk/

St Patrick's Catholic College is a coeducational secondary school located in Thornaby-on-Tees in the Borough of Stockton-on-Tees, England.

Previously a voluntary aided school administered by Stockton-on-Tees Borough Council and the Roman Catholic Diocese of Middlesbrough, St Patrick's Catholic College converted to academy status in September 2015 and became part of the Nicholas Postgate Catholic Academy Trust when it was formed in September 2018. It remains as such to this day.

St Patrick's Catholic College offers GCSEs, BTECs and Cambridge Nationals as programmes of study for pupils.
