= Bishop of Middlesbrough =

Catholic bishopric in England

- Bishopric

catholic
- Incumbent: sede vacante

Location
- Ecclesiastical province: Liverpool

Information
- First holder: Richard Lacy
- Established: 20 December 1878
- Diocese: Middlesbrough
- Cathedral: Middlesbrough Cathedral

The Bishop of Middlesbrough is the Ordinary of the Roman Catholic Diocese of Middlesbrough in the Province of Liverpool, England.

The diocese covers an area of 4,000 km^{2} (1,500 sq mi) of the counties of the East Riding of Yorkshire and North Yorkshire together with the City of York. The see is in the suburb of Coulby Newham in the town of Middlesbrough where the bishop's seat is located at the Cathedral Church of Saint Mary.

The diocese was erected on 20 December 1878 from the Diocese of Beverley. The Right Reverend Terence Drainey was appointed seventh Bishop of Middlesbrough appointed by the Holy See on 17 November 2007 and consecrated on 25 January 2008. In accordance with Canon 401 §1, Drainey’s resignation as Bishop of Middlesbrough, submitted on reaching the age of 75, was accepted by Pope Leo XIV on 22 December 2025. On the same day, Bishop Marcus Stock of Leeds was appointed Apostolic Administrator of the Diocese of Middlesbrough.

== List of the Bishops of the Roman Catholic Diocese of Middlesbrough ==
Bishops of Middlesbrough
From	Until	Incumbent	Notes
1879	1929	Richard Lacy	Appointed bishop on 12 September 1879 and consecrated on 18 December 1879. Died in office on 11 April 1929.
1929	1955	Thomas Shine	Appointed Coadjutor Bishop of Middlesbrough and Titular Bishop of Lamus on 12 April 1921 and consecrated on 29 June 1921. Succeeded Bishop of Middlesbrough on 11 April 1929. Appointed to the personal title of archbishop on 19 January 1955. Died in office on 22 November 1955.
1956	1967	George Brunner	Formerly an auxiliary bishop of Middlesbrough and Titular Bishop of Elis (1946–1956). Appointed Bishop of Middlesbrough on 4 April 1956. Retired on 13 June 1967 and appointed Titular Bishop of Murustaga. Died on 21 March 1969.
1967	1978	John Gerard McClean	Appointed Coadjutor Bishop of Middlesbrough and Titular Bishop of Maxita on 10 December 1966 and consecrated on 24 February 1967. Succeeded as Bishop of Middlesbrough on 13 June 1967. Died in office on 28 August 1978.
1978	1992	Augustine Harris	Formerly an auxiliary bishop of Liverpool (1965–1978). Appointed Bishop of Middlesbrough on 10 November 1978. Retired on 3 November 1992 and died on 30 August 2007.
1992	2007	John Patrick Crowley	Formerly an auxiliary bishop of Westminster (1986–1992). Appointed Bishop of Middlesbrough on 3 November 1992. Resigned on 3 May 2007.
2007	2025	Terence Patrick Drainey	Formerly a priest of the Diocese of Salford (1975–2007). Appointed Bishop of Middlesbrough on 17 November 2007 and consecrated on 25 January 2008.
