= Saint David's School (New York City) =

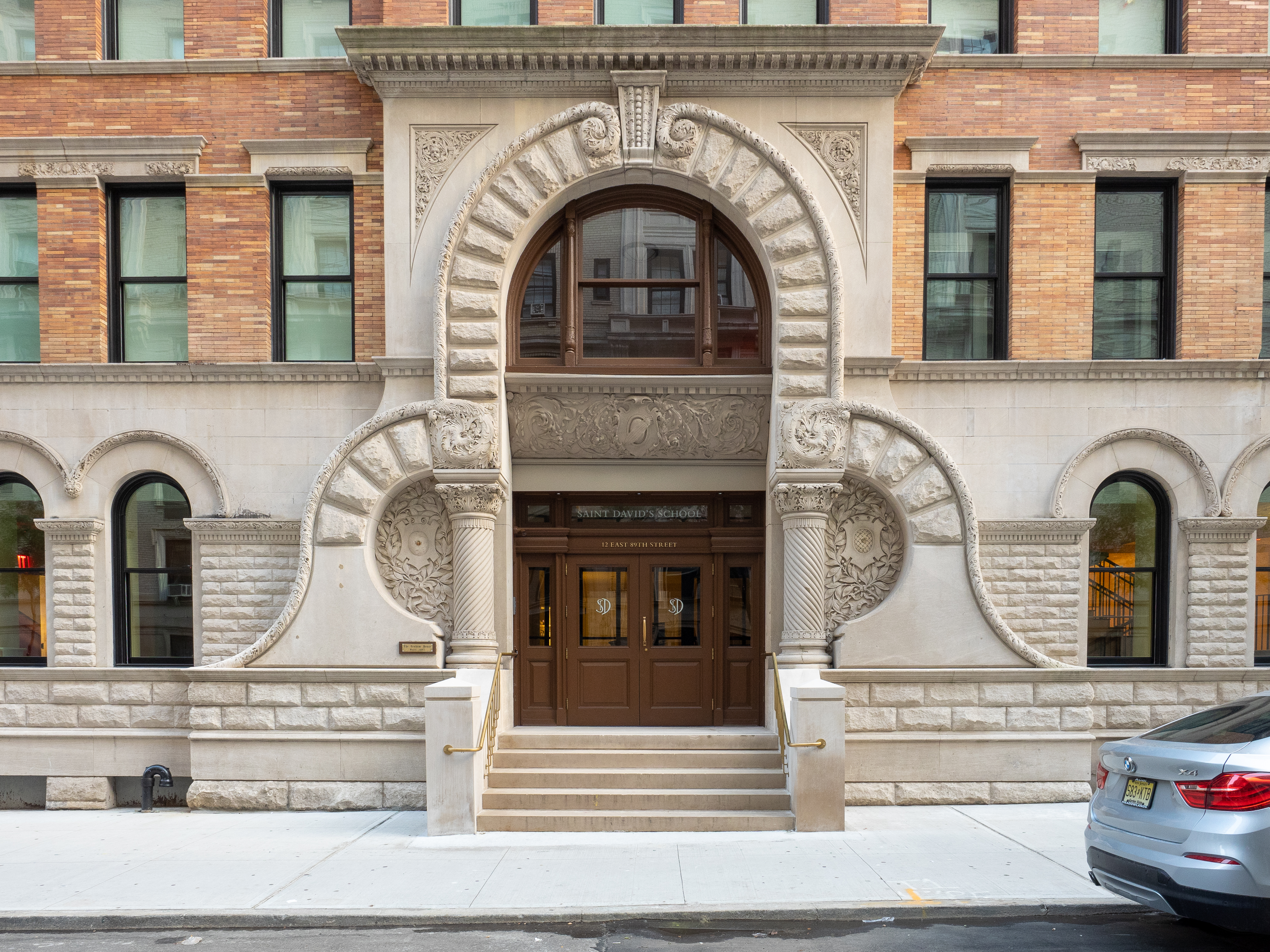

Location
- 12 East 89th Street; New York City, New York 10128; United States
- Coordinates: 40.7829°N 73.9583°W

Information
- School type: Private
- Motto: "That They Be Good Men"
- Established: 1951 (75 years ago)
- Headmaster: P. David O'Halloran
- Grades: PreK–8
- Gender: All-boys
- Enrollment: 416
- Average class size: 18
- Campus type: Urban
- Colors: Red and white
- Newspaper: The Canticle
- Website: saintdavids.org

Saint David's School is an independent primary and pre-primary school for boys on the Upper East Side of Manhattan, New York City.

The school educates boys from pre-kindergarten through to eighth grade. Saint David's was founded in 1951. The current headmaster is P. David O'Halloran.

== History ==
Saint David’s was originally the home of Ruth Hunter Cutting, daughter of Robert Fulton Cutting, known as a prominent financier (he and his brother William Bayard Cutting brought the sugar beet industry to the United States), philanthropist and as "the first citizen of New York".

The school officially opened on February 5, 1951, and Saint David's began with one teacher and four students. Its purpose, according to its nine founding families, was "to provide a sound substantial education for the growing boy, equal to the best, derived from institutions of a similar level."

While a school in the Roman Catholic tradition, Saint David's has always been lay-run and independent.

Chaplains that serve and have served the school are: Msgr. Thomas Leonard (1968–2003), Rev. Stephen Katsourous, S.J. (2003–2011) Rev. Patrick Bonner, S.T.B., M.S., J.C.L., and Father Christopher Keenan.

In the decades since its founding, Saint David's has undertaken several expansions, adding facilities for its academic and athletics programs. Today, the school community includes 400 students and more than 130 faculty and staff.

== Academics ==
Saint David's School is accredited by the New York State Association of Independent Schools, the National Association of Independent Schools, and the Educational Records Bureau.

Boys have largely moved onto day schools in New York City, including Regis High School or Collegiate School, while others moved onto boarding schools; boys have gone to Deerfield Academy, Kent School, Trinity-Pawling School, Phillips Exeter Academy, Choate Rosemary Hall, Lawrenceville School, and Phillips Academy (Andover).

== Athletics ==
The school offers a sports program, including baseball, basketball, cross-country, flag football, floor hockey, lacrosse, soccer, squash, and track. It three gymnasiums on-campus (including one that is middle school regulation size)

As an after-school elective, Saint David's also offers an ice hockey program which begins in kindergarten and is available until 8th grade. In the 2018-2019 hockey season, Saint David's won its first ice hockey championship in the Hudson Valley Hockey League by defeating North Park.

In early June 2019, the school was visited by Justin Tuck, formerly of the New York Giants, to speak at an athletics networking event for alumni, parents, and students.

The school has also been visited multiple times by Tom Brady, whose son, Jack, attended the school. Tom Brady has also occasionally held a football toss with students at the school as a fundraising initiative.

== Community service ==
Saint David's participates in many community-service initiatives, some of which include its annual Halloween candy drive, its bottle cap drive, and other fundraising projects. It works with New York Cares for its annual coat drive, the Graham Windham Mitten and Hat Collection, Project Cicero for book donations, City Harvest for annual food drives, Ronald McDonald's Fun Run, Florence Nightingale Nursing Home and Terence Cardinal Cooke Nursing Home for nursing home visits and carols, and It's My Park Day to rejuvenate New York City Parks.

In 2004, the school raised more than $10,000 for the Red Cross and its South East Asia Tsunami Fund. In 2010, it raised $36,000 for Clinton Bush Haiti Fund. And in 2011, the school began a new initiative to raise money to build a school in the Tigray Region of Ethiopia with the help of Mimi's Building Blocks and Save the Children. It raised more than $120,000 and Saint David's Kalina School opened in Ethiopia in the fall of 2013.

== Notable alumni ==
- Robert Chambers – criminal
- Andrew Giuliani – Special Assistant to President Trump and Associate Director of the Office of Public Liaison; son of Rudy Giuliani (mayor of New York City from 1994 to 2001)
- Ryu Goto – concert violinist
- John F. Kennedy Jr. – son of John F. Kennedy and Jacqueline Kennedy
- Prince Ali Reza Pahlavi – son of the last Shah of Iran and second in line to the succession of the throne of Iran until the Islamic Revolution
- Andrew Rossi – documentary filmmaker
- Dick Wolf – television producer

== Headmasters ==
- Thomas F. Herlihy (1951–1953)
- David D. Hume (1953–1990)
- Timothy Burns (1990–1992)
- Dr. Donald T. Maiocco (1992–2004)
- Dr. P. David O'Halloran (since 2004)
