= Thomas Shine =

Irish-born prelate (1872–1955)

- (Arch)Bishop of Middlesbrough
- Church: Catholic Church
- Diocese: Diocese of Middlesbrough
- In office: 11 April 1929 – 22 November 1955
- Predecessor: Richard Lacy
- Successor: George Brunner
- Previous posts: Titular Bishop of Lamus (1921-1929); Coadjutor Bishop of Middlesbrough (1921-1929)

Orders
- Ordination: 29 June 1894
- Consecration: 29 June 1921 by Richard Lacy

Personal details
- Born: 12 February 1872 Knockannaveigh (northeast of New Inn), County Tipperary, United Kingdom of Great Britain and Ireland
- Died: 22 November 1955 (aged 83) Middlesbrough, Yorkshire, United Kingdom

Thomas Shine KC*HS (12 February 1872 – 22 November 1955) was an Irish-born prelate of the Roman Catholic Church. He served as the Bishop of Middlesbrough from 1929 to 1955.

Born in New Inn, County Tipperary, Ireland on 12 February 1872, completing his clerical studies in St. Joseph's Seminary, Leeds and, he was ordained to the priesthood on 29 June 1894. He was appointed Coadjutor Bishop of Middlesbrough and Titular Bishop of Lamus on 12 April 1921. His consecration to the Episcopate took place on 29 June 1921, the principal consecrator was Bishop Richard Lacy of Middlesbrough, and the principal co-consecrators were Bishop Joseph Cowgill of Leeds and Archbishop Frederick Keating of Liverpool. He preached the requiem mass for Mother Mary Loyola, the international bestselling author, with bishop Cowgill as the celebrant. On the death of Bishop Lacy on 11 April 1929, Shine automatically succeeded as the Bishop of Middlesbrough. He was appointed the personal title of archbishop on 19 January 1955. His episcopal motto was rare enough in French: Briller sans bruler, a wink to his last name 'Shine: 'shining not burning' - the elegant alliteration holds only in French. Archbishop Shine died in office on 22 November 1955, aged 83.

== Death ==
Thomas Shine, second bishop of Middlesbrough, died at the Sisters of Mercy Nursing Home at Whitby on 22 November 1955, in his 84th year. He had been a priest for 61 years, 34 years a bishop, and bishop of the Diocese of Middlesbrough for 26 years. He died as an archbishop, a Count of the Holy Roman Empire, assistant at the Pontifical Throne, and Knight Commander of the Holy Sepulchre.

Catholic Church titles
Preceded by Richard Lacy	Bishop of Middlesbrough; 1929–1955	Succeeded by George Brunner
