= Roman Catholic Diocese of Middlesbrough =

Catholic diocese in England

Diocese of Middlesbrough Dioecesis Medioburgensis

Catholic
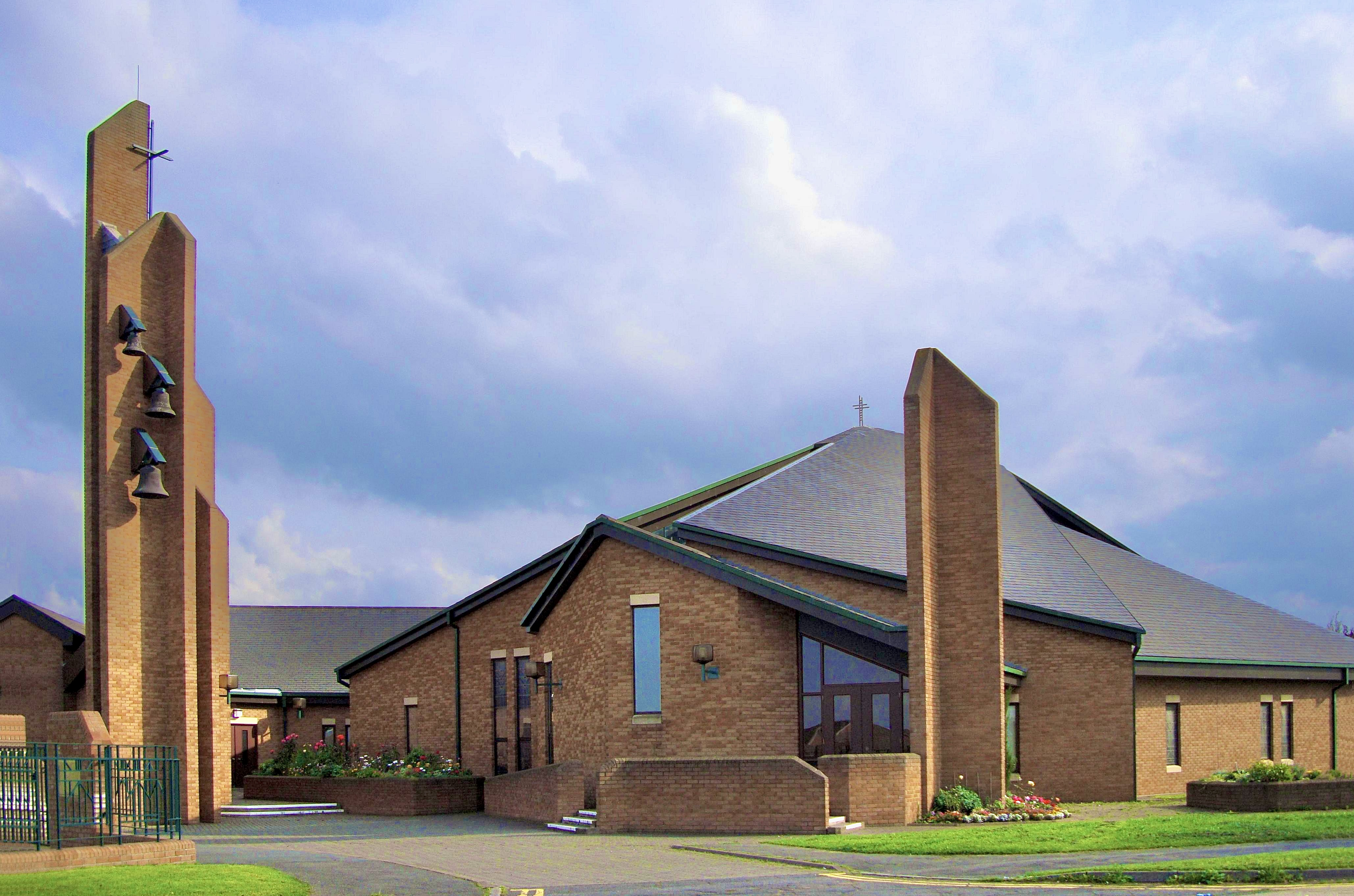
- Middlesbrough Cathedral

Location
- Country: England
- Territory: East Riding of Yorkshire; North Riding of Yorkshire; York
- Ecclesiastical province: Liverpool
- Metropolitan: Archdiocese of Liverpool
- Coordinates: 54.523°N 1.214°W

Statistics
- Parishes: 66

Information
- Denomination: Roman Catholic
- Sui iuris church: Latin Church
- Rite: Roman Rite
- Established: 20 December 1878
- Cathedral: Middlesbrough Cathedral
- Secular priests: 93

Current leadership
- Pope: Leo XIV
- Bishop: sede vacante
- Metropolitan Archbishop: John Francis Sherrington
- Vicar General: Gerard Robinson
- Bishops emeritus: Terence Patrick Drainey, John Patrick Crowley

Map
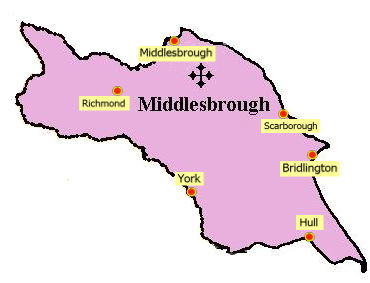
- Diocese of Middlesbrough

Website
- middlesbrough-diocese.org.uk

The Diocese of Middlesbrough (Latin: Dioecesis Medioburgensis) is a Latin diocese of the Catholic Church based in Middlesbrough, England and is part of the province of Liverpool. It was founded on 20 December 1878, with the splitting of the Diocese of Beverley which had covered all of Yorkshire. The Bishop's See is in Coulby Newham, Middlesbrough, at St Mary's Cathedral. Catholic schools in the diocese are run by the Nicholas Postgate Catholic Academy Trust as well as St Cuthbert's Roman Catholic Academy Trust.

== History ==
The diocese was created on 20 December 1878, when the then Diocese of Beverley, which covered the whole of Yorkshire, was divided into the Diocese of Middlesbrough, covering the North and East Ridings of Yorkshire and those parishes in the City of York to the north of the River Ouse, and the Diocese of Leeds, covering the West Riding of Yorkshire and those parishes in the City of York to the south of the River Ouse. In 1982 the two York parishes south of the River Ouse were ceded to the Diocese of Middlesbrough to unite the City of York under one bishop. The parish of Howden was transferred from Middlesbrough to the Leeds diocese in 2004.

== Bishops ==
The Rt Rev Terence Patrick Drainey was ordained as the seventh Bishop of Middlesbrough on 25 January 2008, replacing the Right Reverend John Patrick Crowley. In accordance with Canon 401 §1, Bishop Drainey’s resignation as Bishop of Middlesbrough, submitted on reaching the age of 75, was accepted by Pope Leo XIV on 22 December 2025. On the same day, Bishop Marcus Stock of Leeds was appointed Apostolic Administrator of the Diocese of Middlesbrough.

=== Ordinaries ===
See also Bishop of Middlesbrough.

- Richard Lacy (1879-1929)
- Thomas Shine (1929-1955), became Archbishop (personal title) in 1955 before he died
- George Brunner (1956-1967)
- John Gerard McClean (1967-1978)
- Augustine Harris (1978-1992)
- John Patrick Crowley (1992-2007)
- Terence Patrick Drainey (2007-2025)

=== Coadjutor Bishops ===
- Thomas Shine (1921-1929)
- John Gerard McClean (1966-1967)
- William Gordon Wheeler (1964-1966), did not succeed to see; appointed Bishop of Leeds

=== Auxiliary Bishops ===
- George Brunner (1946-1956), appointed Bishop here
- Thomas Kevin O'Brien (1981-1998)

=== Other priest of this diocese who became bishop ===
- Henry John Poskitt, appointed Bishop of Leeds in 1936

== Parishes ==
Below is a list of the parishes and churches which fall within the Diocese of Middlesbrough, these are presented within the local vicariates:

=== Northern Vicariate ===
Patrons: Our Lady of Perpetual Help, Romuald, Bede and Luke Kirby

St Mary's Cathedral, Coulby Newham • Sacred Heart and St Patrick, Middlesbrough • St Joseph, Middlesbrough • St Thomas More, Middlesbrough • Holy Name of Mary, Middlesbrough • St Francis of Assisi, Middlesbrough • St Alphonsus, North Ormesby • St Gabriel, Ormesby • Corpus Christi, Middlesbrough • St Clare of Assisi, Middlesbrough • St Andrew's Parish, Teesville • St Pius X, Middlesbrough • St Bernadette's, Nunthorpe • St Joseph, Stokesley • St Mary, Crathorne • St Thérèse of Lisieux, Ingleby Barwick • St Patrick, Thornaby • Christ the King, Thornaby • Ss Mary and Romuald, Yarm • Our Lady of Mount Grace, Osmotherley • Sacred Heart, Redcar • St Augustine, Redcar • St Bede, Marske-by-the-Sea • Our Lady of Lourdes, Saltburn • St Anthony of Padua, Brotton • St Paulinus, Guisborough • Ss Joseph & Cuthbert, Loftus • Sacred Heart, Northallerton • Ss Mary & Joseph, Bedale • All Saints, Thirsk • Ss Joseph & Francis Xavier, Richmond • Ss Peter & Paul, Leyburn • St Mary's, Wycliffe • Ss Simon and Jude, Ulshaw Bridge • St Bede, Catterick • Hawes • St Joan of Arc, Catterick Garrison • St Margaret Clitherow, Great Ayton

=== Central Vicariate ===
Patron: St Hilda

York Oratory • St George's York • St Joseph, York • St Aelred, York • English Martyrs York • Our Lady, York • St Paulinus, York • St Joseph, Green Hammerton • St Margaret Clitherow, Haxby • University Chaplaincy Centre, York • Shrine of St Margaret Clitherow, York • St Bede's Pastoral Centre, York • Ss Mary & Everilda, Everingham • St Hilda (English Martyrs Sleights), Whitby • St Hedda, Egton Bridge • Our Lady of the Sacred Heart, Lealholm • St Anne, Ugthorpe • Our Lady Star of the Sea, Staithes • St Peter's, Scarborough • St Joseph's Church, Newby • St Mary, Filey • St Leonard & Mary, Malton • St Joseph, Pickering • St Laurence's Abbey, Ampleforth • Our Lady and St Benedict, Ampleforth • Our Lady and the Holy Angels, Gilling East • St Aidan, Oswaldkirk • St Mary, Helmsley • St John the Evangelist, Easingwold • St Chad, Kirkbymoorside

=== Southern Vicariate ===
Patrons: Everilda and Willibrord

Ss Mary and Joseph, Pocklington • St John of Beverley, Beverley • Our Lady of Perpetual Help, Market Weighton • St John the Baptist, Holme-on-Spalding Moor • Our Lady & St Peter, Bridlington • Our Lady & St Edward, Driffield • Holy Cross, Cottingham • St Anthony and Our Lady of Mercy, Hull • Our Lady of Lourdes and St. Peter Chanel, Hull • St Charles Borromeo, Hull • St Joseph, Hull • Holy Name, Hull (closed c.2012) • St Vincent De Paul, Hull • Corpus Christi, Hull • St Wilfrid, Hull • Our Lady of Lourdes, Hessle • St Willibrord University Chaplaincy, Hull • Sacred Heart, Hull • St Bede, Hull • St Stephen, Hull • St Francis of Assisi, Hull • St Mary, Queen of Martyrs, Hull • Ss Mary & Joseph, Hedon • Sacred Heart, Hornsea • Ss Peter & John Fisher, Withernsea • Most Holy Sacrament, Marton

== Nicholas Postgate Catholic Academy Trust ==
Nicholas Postgate Catholic Academy Trust
- Established: September 1, 2018
- Type: Multi-academy trust
- Purpose: Education
- Headquarters: Postgate House, Saltersgill Avenue, Middlesbrough, TS4 3JP
- Coordinates: 54.5455°N 1.2314°W
- Region served: Diocese of Middlesbrough
- Key people: Mark J Dias - Chair; Karen Siedle - Interim CEO
- Website: npcat.org.uk

Nicholas Postgate Catholic Academy Trust (NPCAT) is a Catholic multi-academy trust (MAT) that operates thirty-eight schools (six secondary and thirty-two primary), serving the northern, central, and western areas of the Roman Catholic Diocese of Middlesbrough, spanning Teesside, North Yorkshire, and the City of York. As the largest MAT within the diocese and one of the largest Catholic academy trusts in England, it functions as an exempt charity regulated by the Department for Education. The trust's official song is "Called to Serve". Its headquarters are on the site of Trinity Catholic College.

=== History ===
In 2017, the Bishop commissioned a restructuring of the 54 schools within the Diocese. As a result, arrangements were made to place schools into one of three large Catholic Academy Trusts, to improve support, stability, and resource sharing across the diocese:

- Nicholas Postgate Catholic Academy Trust (NPCAT): Serving Middlesbrough, Redcar & Cleveland, and Stockton-on-Tees
- St Margaret Clitherow Catholic Academy Trust (SMCCAT): Serving North Yorkshire, East Riding of Yorkshire, and York
- St Cuthbert's Catholic Academy Trust (SCCAT): Serving the Hull area

==== Formation and initial expansion (2018–2020) ====
NPCAT was officially formed on 1 September 2018. The initial merger brought together 25 Teesside schools, integrated from four smaller predecessor trusts, alongside a local authority-maintained voluntary aided (VA) school:

- Nicholas Postgate Academy Trust (NPAT): Acted as the legal host entity (incorporation in 2014), which then expanded to NPCAT in its current form, initially comprising five Redcar & Cleveland schools, which had previously merged between 2014 and 2015 (Sacred Heart Catholic Secondary, St Bede's, St Benedict's, St Joseph's, and St Paulinus).
- St Oswald's Catholic Academy Trust: Four Redcar & Cleveland schools (St Gabriel's, St Margaret Clitherow, St Mary's, and St Peter's Catholic College).
- Our Lady of Light Catholic Academy Trust: Four Stockton schools (Christ the King, St Patrick's, St Patrick's Catholic College, and St Thérèse of Lisieux).
- St Hilda's Catholic Academy Trust: 11 Middlesbrough schools (Corpus Christi, Sacred Heart, St Alphonsus', St Augustine's, St Bernadette's, St Clare's, St Edward's, St Gerard's, St Joseph's, St Thomas More, and Trinity Catholic College & Sixth Form).
- Additionally, St Pius X joined at launch as the local authority-maintained VA school.

Further conversions followed afterwards, with All Saints Primary joining in June 2019 and St Hedda's joining in September 2020, both as local authority-maintained VA schools.

==== Central Vicariate transfer and growth (2022–present) ====
Following structural challenges within the St Margaret Clitherow Catholic Academy Trust due to its wide geographical spread, SMCCAT was dissolved. To ensure administrative stability and better resource distribution, St Cuthbert's and NPCAT absorbed the schools which had been previously administered by SMCCAT. In September 2022, 10 schools from the Central Vicariate of the diocese were transferred into NPCAT: Our Lady Queen of Martyrs, Sacred Heart (Northallerton), St Aelred's, St Benedict's, St Francis Xavier School, St George's, St Joseph's, St Mary's in Malton, St Mary's in Richmond, and St Wilfrid's).

In 2022, NPCAT and Trinity Catholic College launched the T6 Football Academy to cater for rising talent within the trust.

In May 2023, All Saints Catholic School & Sixth Form joined NPCAT, after originally intending to join SMCCAT prior to its dissolution.

=== Current Schools ===
Sources:

=== Secondary Schools ===
- All Saints Catholic School & Sixth Form
- Sacred Heart Catholic Secondary
- St Francis Xavier School
- St Patrick's Catholic College
- St Peter's Catholic College
- Trinity Catholic College & Sixth Form

=== Primary Schools ===
In City of York:

- Our Lady Queen of Martyrs Catholic Primary School
- St Aelred's Catholic Primary School
- St George's Catholic Primary School
- St Wilfrid's Catholic Primary School

In Middlesbrough:

- Corpus Christi Catholic Primary School
- Sacred Heart Catholic Primary School (Middlesbrough)
- St Alphonsus' Catholic Primary School
- St Augustine's Catholic Primary School
- St Bernadette's Catholic Primary School
- St Clare's Catholic Primary School
- St Edward's Catholic Primary School
- St Gerard's Catholic Primary School
- St Joseph's Catholic Primary School (Middlesbrough)
- St Pius X Catholic Primary School
- St Thomas More Catholic Primary School

In North Yorkshire:

- All Saints Catholic Primary School
- Sacred Heart Catholic Primary School (Northallerton)
- St Benedict's Catholic Primary School (York)
- St Hedda's Catholic Primary School
- St Joseph's Catholic Primary School (Pickering, North Yorkshire)
- St Mary's Catholic Primary School (Richmond, North Yorkshire)
- St Mary's Catholic Primary School (Malton, North Yorkshire)

In Redcar & Cleveland:

- St Bede's Catholic Primary School
- St Benedict's Catholic Primary School (Redcar)
- St Gabriel's Catholic Primary School
- St Joseph's Catholic Primary School (Loftus, North Yorkshire)
- St Margaret Clitherow Catholic Primary School
- St Mary's Catholic Primary School (Grangetown, North Yorkshire)
- St Paulinus Catholic Primary School

In Stockton-on-Tees:

- Christ the King Catholic Primary School
- St Patrick's Catholic Primary School
- St Thérèse of Lisieux Catholic Primary School

== See also ==
- List of Catholic churches in the United Kingdom
