= Terry Drainey =

British bishop

The Right Reverend Terry Drainey
- Bishop of Middlesbrough
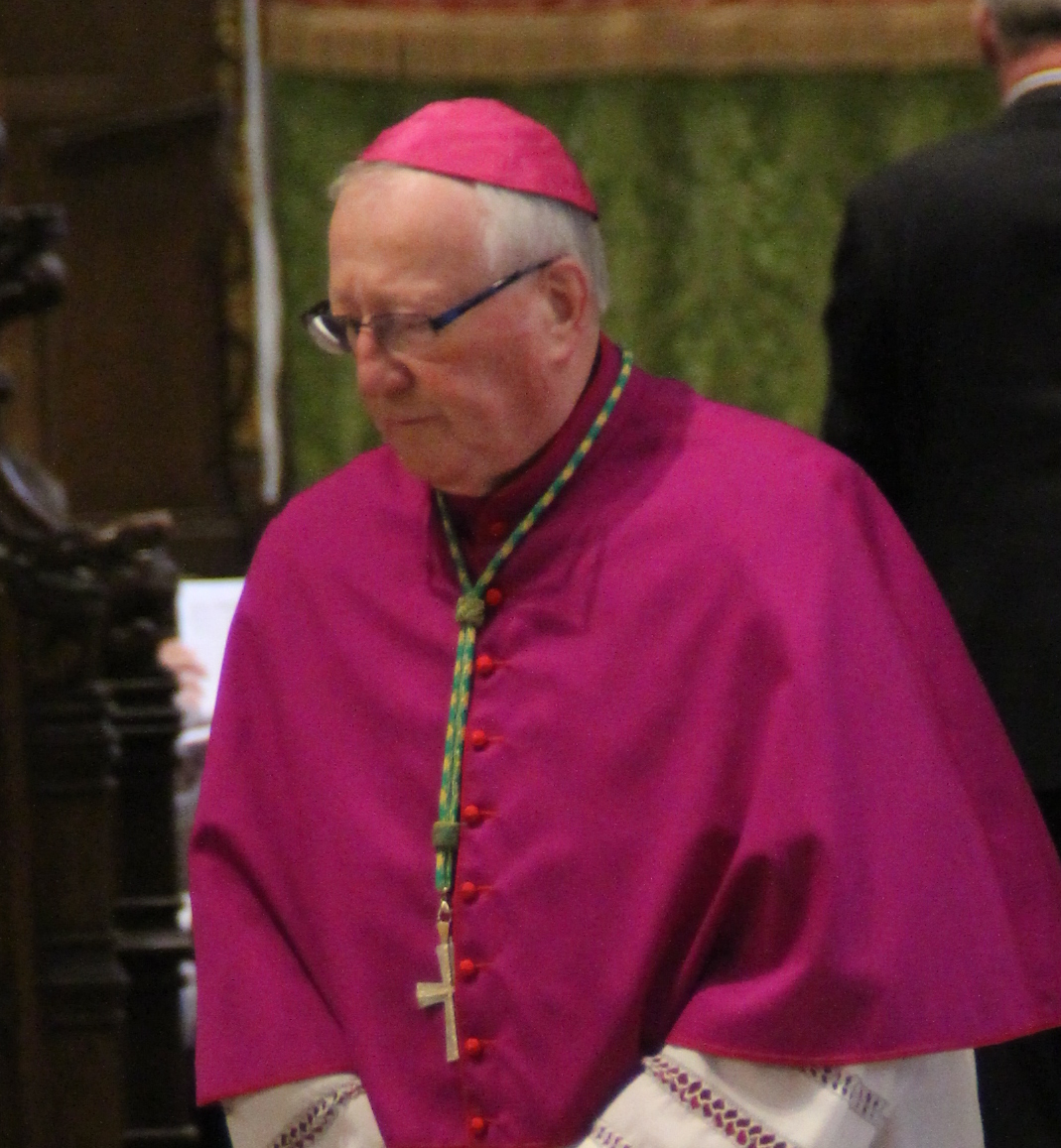
- Bishop Drainey in 2024
- Church: Roman Catholic
- Province: Liverpool
- Diocese: Middlesbrough
- See: Middlesbrough
- Appointed: 17 November 2007
- Installed: 25 January 2008
- Term ended: 22 December 2025
- Predecessor: John Patrick Crowley

Orders
- Ordination: 12 July 1975 by Thomas Holland
- Consecration: 25 January 2008 by Patrick Altham Kelly

Personal details
- Born: 1 August 1949 (age 76) Manchester, United Kingdom
- Denomination: Roman Catholic
- Motto: expectantes beatam spem
- Coat of arms

Styles of Terence Drainey
- Reference style: The Right Reverend
- Spoken style: My Lord
- Religious style: Bishop

Terence Patrick Drainey (born 1 August 1949, in Manchester) is an English Catholic prelate and served as the seventh Bishop of Middlesbrough until his retirement in December 2025.

== Career ==
Drainey studied for the priesthood at St Cuthbert's College, Ushaw and the Royal English College at Valladolid, Spain. He was ordained in 1975 for the Diocese of Salford where he worked for ten years as an assistant priest at St Wulstan, Great Harwood. From 1986 to 1991 he was on loan to the Archdiocese of Kisumu in Kenya as a fidei donum (literally translated as "gift of faith") priest.

In 1991, upon leaving Africa, Drainey returned to the Salford diocese where he was appointed parish priest at the church of the Holy Cross, Patricroft, Eccles in Salford, where he served for the next six years prior to being appointed spiritual director to the Royal English College at Valladolid in 1997.

In June 2003, Drainey returned to England to take up the position of President of Ushaw College. Three years later, on 12 April 2006, he was appointed a Papal Chaplain by Pope Benedict XVI with the title of Monsignor.

Drainey was appointed seventh Bishop of Middlesbrough by the Pope on 17 November 2007 and was installed by Patrick Kelly, Archbishop of Liverpool, in St Mary's Cathedral, Middlesbrough, on 25 January 2008. Upon his appointment he requested that people call him "Bishop Terry" to avoid confusion with Bishop Terence Brain of Salford. In accordance with Canon 401 §1, Drainey's resignation as Bishop of Middlesbrough, submitted on reaching the age of 75, was accepted by Pope Leo XIV on 22 December 2025. On the same day, Bishop Marcus Stock of Leeds was appointed Apostolic Administrator of the Diocese of Middlesbrough. He will remain living within the Diocese of Middlesbrough.

== Personal life ==
He was born in Manchester in 1949. His parents were Joseph Patrick Drainey and Mary Elizabeth, a convert to Catholicism. His father was an optician in Clayton, Manchester. He has a sister, Mrs Pat Paver.

Catholic Church titles
Preceded by John Patrick Crowley	Bishop of Middlesbrough; 2007–2025	Vacant
