= Sacred Heart Catholic Secondary =

Academy in Redcar, North Yorkshire, England

Location
- Mersey Road; Redcar, North Yorkshire, TS10 1PJ; England; 54.61154°N 1.07519°W

Information
- Type: Academy
- Motto: Semper Fidelis
- Religious affiliation: Roman Catholic
- Established: 1963
- Local authority: Redcar & Cleveland
- Trust: Nicholas Postgate Catholic Academy Trust
- Department for Education URN: 142273 Tables
- Ofsted: Reports
- Head teacher: Louise Dwyer
- Age: 11 to 16
- Website: sacredheart.npcat.org.uk

Sacred Heart Catholic Secondary, formerly Sacred Heart Roman Catholic VA School, is a Roman Catholic secondary school located in Redcar, North Yorkshire, England.

== History ==
The school was originally built in the 1960s but moved to new premises in 2007. The school is a specialist Science College.

Previously a voluntary aided school administered by Redcar and Cleveland Council and the Roman Catholic Diocese of Middlesbrough, Sacred Heart Roman Catholic VA School converted to academy status in September 2015. The school is now part of the Nicholas Postgate Catholic Academy Trust, along with a number of other Catholic primary schools locally that are within the Diocese of Middlesbrough.

== Reputation ==
The school is successful in comparison to the other schools in the area. KS4 results have been in the top 5% of schools nationally in both 2008 and 2009. 87% of its pupils achieved five or more GCSE (or equivalent) grades at A*-C in 2009. In 2008 Ofsted judged that it was a good school with outstanding features. As of 2023, the school's most recent inspection was in 2022, with a judgement of Good.

== Alumni ==
- Hayden Hackney — Professional Footballer (played for Middlesbrough F.C, currently at Everton)
