= Martha Kane =

UK soap opera character, created 2012

- Hollyoaks character
- Portrayed by: Carli Norris
- Duration: 2012–2013
- First appearance: 18 January 2012
- Last appearance: 8 November 2013
- Introduced by: Emma Smithwick
In-universe information
- Occupation: Florist assistant (2012–2013)
- Sons: Callum Kane
- Daughters: Ash Kane; Lacey Kane

Martha Kane is a fictional character from the British Channel 4 soap opera Hollyoaks, played by Carli Norris. The character debuted on-screen during the episode broadcast on 18 January 2012. The character was introduced as the mother of Ash (Holly Weston), Callum (Laurie Duncan) and Lacey Kane (Georgia Bourke). Martha is portrayed as a feisty female and a liberal parent. Martha is an alcoholic and has been used to portray the effects the issue has on involved family members. Her addiction causes trouble and affects her youngest daughter, Lacey, following a violent altercation. Despite attempting to overcome her addiction, Martha failed to stop drinking.

The character has also featured in comedy scenes and struck up friendships with fellow older characters. She has also feuds with Ash's boyfriends. Martha dislikes Ally Gorman (Dan O'Connor) and eventually exposes him as a fraud. She later sets out to prove Will Savage (James Atherton) is a murderer and succeeds. After two years at Hollyoaks, Norris filmed her final scenes, which aired on 8 November 2013. Laura Morgan from All About Soap branded Martha as soap opera's worst mother, while reporters from Digital Spy and What's on TV believed that the character left in "high regard".

== Character development ==
=== Introduction and characterisation ===
In January 2012, the serial's producer Emma Smithwick said that she wanted to explore Ash (Holly Weston) and Callum Kane's (Laurie Duncan) backstories. She revealed that she planned to introduce "satellite" family members in the process. Martha appeared on a semi-regular basis. On the serial's official website, Martha is described as being "loveable but feisty, straight-talking and fun". Martha is more of a "liberal parent than a strict one". Martha is a single mother, she dislikes the father of her children who wealthy and lives in Dubai.

Martha is the feisty mother of Callum, Ash and Lacey. Not the most conventional of mums, she can often be found accompanying (an unwilling) Ash on a night out... she even danced on the bar at the Spring Fling! There's a dark side to Martha's party animal ways though.

— Channel4.com writer on Martha (2013)

Martha is immature for her age but tries to do the right thing for her children. Norris believes that Martha is "very immauture" because she became pregnant with Ash at a young age, subsequently losing her own childhood. Martha's behavior can alienate people and Norris felt challenged with her scripts to make Martha more likeable. She did so by feeling sympathetic and attempting to understand Martha's behaviour. The character has also been used to portray comedic scenes which drew praise from viewers. Some were shared with Diane O'Connor (Alex Fletcher) and Myra McQueen (Nicole Barber-Lane) and Norris claimed that fans pestered her wanting more scenes featuring the trio.

=== Alcoholism ===
In one storyline, Ash is diagnosed with meningitis, which leaves Martha unable to cope and she turns to alcohol. Weston told Daniel Kilkelly of Digital Spy that the storyline shows that Martha is "not quite the good mum that she pretends to be". This was the first time that viewers were made aware of Martha's alcohol problem. Weston opined that viewers did not understand the reasons they complained about Martha. The scenes gave "a good picture" as to why Ash and Callum had made her out to be a "nightmare mum". Callum is left to deal with Martha's behaviour alone, which proves to be "quite difficult for him". Norris told Alison Slade from TVTimes that Martha "would die for her children" but she still behaves like a child herself. She cannot deal with "anything that requires her to step up and be a mother". Norris said that Martha keeps deserting her family and leaving them to cope with alone. Martha "manipulates Callum and wraps him around her little finger, like she always does." Martha cannot cope with the situation and even misses a meeting with a doctor. The actress added that she Martha would "rather it was Callum sorting it out".

Martha later begins a relationship with her boss. When he cancels their date, Martha begins drinking. However, her daughter Lacey Kane (Georgia Bourke) intervenes by pouring her wine down the sink. Bourke told TVTimes' Slade that "Martha's a bit drunk by that point and lashes out". The following morning Martha is "breezy" and acts as though nothing has happened. Lacey forgives Martha because she attempts to apologise by making her breakfast and taking her shopping. Bourke added that Martha's actions bring Lacey to the realisation of what her mother is "capable of and that her drink problem is worse than she thought". Martha's drinking becomes more frequent in the weeks that followed. Norris told a writer from Inside Soap that her character is in "terrible denial [because] she doesn't think that she drinks too much". Martha is aware of the upset is causes her children, but she "just laughs it off and makes a joke out of the situation". Norris said that it was "awful" of Martha, as her drinking begins to affect Callum and Lacey in different ways. As Lacey is only fifteen, not being able to wake her mother up leaves her "particularly scared". But Callum is "really angry" and when Martha regains consciousness he tells her that he "has had enough" and will not take any more of her behaviour. In July 2012, Norris appeared on The Wright Stuff, explaining that she researched the storyline during filming with help from Hollyoaks bosses. "I did as much [research] as I could. Fortunately for me, I haven't had that kind of lifestyle - I'm not a big boozer myself, and it wasn't a big thing in my family. "But I was really lucky, while we were filming, to come into contact with somebody who was a teenager with a mother who had a serious alcohol problem. He shared some stories with me, and nobody should have to go through that, particularly at that age. And unfortunately she did pass away and left the family in devastation."

Martha decides to stop drinking alcohol and begins to rebuild her life. Norris told Kilkelly that it would be positive message if Martha never drank again. She noted Martha will always be an alcoholic and would dislike Martha having occasional drinks. Norris preferred portraying the storyline to addressed correctly and preferably when it conveys the effects on families.

Martha takes a dislike to Ash's boyfriend Ally Gorman (Dan O'Connor). Susan Hill from the Daily Star reported that everyone had been fooled by Ally and Martha helps to expose it after preventing Ally sleeping with Lacey. A spokesperson for the show stated: "Martha does what any mum would do when she catches them together and all hell breaks loose. Ally has no choice but to admit everything. Lacey is distraught and struggles to come to terms with it all."

=== Departure ===
Martha's remaining on-screen children, Ash and Callum, were killed-off during October 2013. The storyline saw Martha arriving at their memorial service drunk and accuses Ash's boyfriend Will Savage (James Atherton) of killing her. Digital Spy released an article announcing that Martha vows to expose Will's lies. When Leah Barnes (Ela-May Demircan) hands Martha a necklace belonging to the deceased Anna Savage (Saskia Wickham) she questions how she came to be in its possession. She explains that Will was hiding it in Martha's flat and is not disabled as he claims to be. Martha realises the extent of Will's lies. Atherton told Digital Spy's Kilkelly that Martha begins to uncover the truth that he murdered Anna and Texas Longford (Bianca Hendrickse-Spendlove). Martha tells Dennis Savage (Joe Tracini) and Dodger Savage (Danny Mac) of her suspicions and they decide to expose him. But Will overhears there conversation, Atherton said "the wheels are really starting to come off the wagon for him, so he acts in the only way he knows how." Martha's discoveries culmulate with Will taking Martha and his family hostage. The show aired the Martha's final scenes on 8 November 2013, when she leaves to stay with her sister and Lacey. Norris had to keep her departure a secret until transmission. Norris told Kilkelly that "I was originally only meant to be in Hollyoaks for a few episodes, so to be asked to stay for two years was a blessing." While Kilkelly noted that Martha was determined to move forward with her remaining family.

== Storylines ==
Martha first appears when she asks Callum where he has been overnight. She assumes that he spent the night with Maddie Morrison (Scarlett Bowman) when he was actually helping homeless George Smith (Steven Roberts) out. Martha agrees to let George stay with her for aslong as he needs to. When Martha finds a new home, she goes missing leaving Callum and Ash to sort out the moving. She then welcomes home her youngest daughter, Lacey. Martha embarraces Ash by going on a drunken night out with her friends. Ash is taken to hospital and diagnosed with meningitis, unable to cope Martha goes home to get drunk. Martha starts calling in sick and is fired from her job. She interferes with Callum's revision to get him to help with interview preparations. She gets a new job and immediately sleep with her boss after a night of drinking. When her boyfriend cancels their date Martha get drunk and ignores Lacey, who decides to pour her wine down the drain. Martha insults Lacey and slaps her, the following day she tries to bribe Lacey with breakfast and a shopping trip. She later discovers that Lacey has stolen money from the Savage family. Martha takes the money for herself to pay the bills and Lacey uses this against her to have more freedom.

When Martha gets drunk again her children force her to leave the house. Ash invites her boyfriend Ally to move in. Martha returns and tells her children that she is back for good. Martha becomes suspicious of Ally as does Callum. When Martha gets drunk Ally insults her which makes her more determined to rid of him. Martha pretends to be drunk and Ally uses the opportunity to be nasty to her, thinking she will not remember. But as Martha needs to expose him after it is discovered he has lied about his identity. Phoebe Jackson (Mandip Gill) informs Martha that Lacey plans on sleeping with Ally. She manages to get home in time to prevent it and he is arrested for identity fraud. Martha is known to hate the character Callum Ash because he betrayed her for Michael.

The deaths of her children Callum and Ash devastate Martha and she turns up at a memorial for Ash drunk, she begins to suspect Will was responsible for the deaths of Anna and Texas. Will, worrying that his crimes will be exposed holds his family hostage with a shotgun at Anna's house, including Sienna Blake (Anna Passey) who was holding Tom Cunningham (Ellis Hollins) hostage, Martha is also taken hostage by Will and when he tells her she can go he shoots her, however, Martha was only wounded and alerts the police which brings about Will's downfall as he and his brother Dodger Savage (Danny Mac) fight on the roof of the house and both fall from the roof, Dodger is unharmed but Will is paralysed from the fall and is arrested. Martha decides there is nothing to stay in Hollyoaks for and after saying goodbye to the Savages she leaves the village to go and live with her sister and Lacey.

== Reception ==
Laura Morgan from All About Soap said that Martha "if there were ever an award for soap's worst mum then Hollyoaks' Martha Kane would be a sure-fire contender. Immature, irresponsible, alcoholic… The list just goes on and on." Morgan stated that Martha should confront her problems and pay her bills. Martha's "reckless behaviour" has a "massive effect" on Callum and it was not his responsibility to sort Martha's problems. The writer concluded that Martha would not solve her problems because "it'll be left to Callum to pick up the pieces while she drowns her sorrows in another bottle of cheap plonk!" In a poll run by Hollyoaks' official website to discover the best mum out of Martha, Myra McQueen (Nicole Barber-Lane) and Diane O'Connor (Alex Fletcher), Martha received the fewest votes, with over 240 votes and only 3% of the total votes. A writer from TV Magazine said that drinking champagne around Martha was not the greatest idea because she "is struggling to stay away from the demon drink". The writer was unsurprised that "troubled Martha" cannot resist a drink and falls "off the wagon big time". They concluded that "one thing's for sure - it's going to be a while before the Kane's are playing happy families again." A writer from the Metro said that Martha had a "gentle exit" which was a "more low-key fashion" than the more dramatic departures Hollyoaks had been airing in 2013. They added that many viewers were disappointed that Norris had left. Kilkelly opined that the character left in "high regard". A reporter from What's on TV said it was a shock exit and also agreed that the character left on a "high".
