= Ally Gorman =

UK soap opera character, created 2012

- Hollyoaks character
- Portrayed by: Dan O'Connor
- First appearance: 31 January 2012
- Last appearance: 27 November 2012
- Introduced by: Emma Smithwick
In-universe information
- Occupation: Military medic

Ally Gorman (also Edward James) is a fictional character from the Channel 4 soap opera Hollyoaks, played by Dan O'Connor. The actor's casting was announced in December 2011. O'Connor originally auditioned for a different role, before being asked to audition for the part of Ally. O'Connor was given the part and began filming his scenes three days later. Hollyoaks' series producer, Emma Smithwick, said that O'Connor "nailed" his audition. O'Connor signed up for an initial twelve episode stint, but his contract was extended and he became a regular cast member. The actor commutes from London to Liverpool for filming. O'Connor made his debut screen appearance as Ally during the episode broadcast on 31 January 2012. O'Connor departed Hollyoaks on 27 November 2012.

Before his arrival on screen, O'Connor revealed that Ally has a "dark past" that would be "uncovered eventually in true soap style". Ally is Australian and a military medic. O'Connor described his character as a "nice, loveable guy" who is "very friendly and kind". Smithwick said Ally is "contradictory" and "crosses a divide". She called Ally sensitive and described him as a "real guy's guy". A writer for the official Hollyoaks website described Ally as a "Hot Aussie" In June 2012, it was revealed that Ally would lose his "strait-laced good boy" reputation.

Ally is introduced as the new lodger of Jacqui McQueen (Claire Cooper) and Rhys Ashworth (Andrew Moss). Ally's storylines have mainly focused on his relationship with Amy Barnes (Ashley Slanina-Davies). It is later revealed that Ally has a "mystery connection" to newcomer, Walker (Neil Newbon). Lynsey Nolan (Karen Hassan) discovers this and decides to investigate their history. Lynsey is later murdered in a whodunit storyline, with Ally becoming a suspect in her death. Sarah Ellis of Inside Soap did not agree with a viewer's criticism of O'Connor's acting and opined that he is doing a "stellar job".

== Casting ==
On 11 December 2011, Jonathon Moran and Elle Halliwell of The Daily Telegraph reported that O'Connor had joined the cast of Hollyoaks as Ally. O'Connor was previously best known for playing Ned Parker in Australian soap opera, Neighbours. O'Connor originally auditioned for a different role twice, before being asked to audition for the part of Ally. O'Connor was given the part and began filming his scenes three days later. O'Connor said of his casting: "I'm really excited about joining Hollyoaks, especially with its recent success. [...] I'm really looking forward to working with some of the show's most popular characters and talented actors." Hollyoaks' series producer, Emma Smithwick, told Sarah Ellis of Inside Soap that she was familiar with O'Connor from his work on Neighbours. Smithwick said that when O'Connor auditioned for the role he "nailed it" and admitted that the actor's good looks were also appealing. O'Connor signed up for an initial twelve episode stint, but his contract was extended and he became a regular cast member. O'Connor commutes from London to Liverpool, where Hollyoaks is filmed, for the role. O'Connor made his first screen appearance as Ally on 31 January 2012. In April 2012, O'Connor revealed that he would remain on the show "at least until the end of [2012]". The character was originally named "Ally Grogan", which was later changed to "Ally Gorman".

== Development ==
=== Characterisation and introduction ===
Ally is Australian and a military medic, who has recently returned from service in Afghanistan. O'Connor revealed that Ally has a "dark past" that would be "uncovered eventually in true soap style". When asked to describe his character in an interview with Daniel Kilkelly of Digital Spy, O'Connor stated "He's a nice, loveable guy - very friendly and kind." The official Hollyoaks website described Ally as a "Hot Aussie". Smithwick said she liked Ally because he is "contradictory" and "crosses a divide", calling him "sensitive". Smithwick described Ally as a "real guy's guy". Ally arrives in the village as a lodger for Jacqui McQueen (Claire Cooper) and Rhys Ashworth (Andrew Moss). Both Jacqui and Rhys like Ally. Smithwick revealed that Ally would befriend Rhys and they would become "buddies". O'Connor told Kilkelly that there is a "good bond" between Ally and Rhys. The actor revealed that Ally and Rhys "seem to get on really well". It initially appears that the living arrangements are "quite rosy and like a perfect match". However, as Ally stays longer he questions whether he was right to move in with Jacqui and Rhys as they are continuously arguing. O'Connor noted the similarities between Ally and Ned Parker, the character he portrayed in Australian soap opera, Neighbours. He told Kilkelly "At first, it felt like I was playing the same character that I played on Neighbours, but that could just be a stereotypical Australian thing - that we all seem to be laid-back, genuine people!"

=== Relationship with Amy Barnes ===
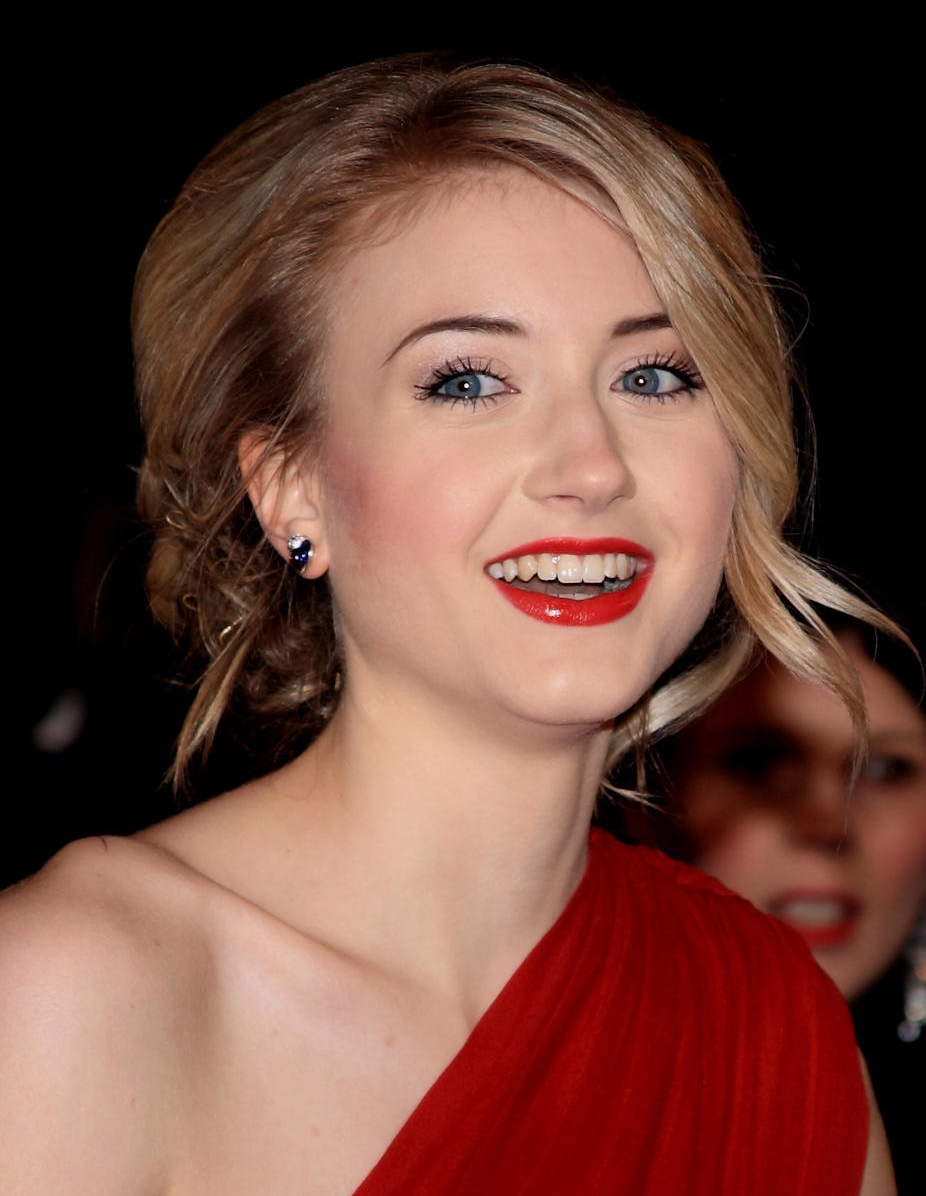
Ashley Slanina-Davies (pictured) plays Ally's love interest, Amy Barnes.

O'Connor told a writer from All About Soap that there is "definitely potential" for a romance to develop between Ally and another character. O'Connor was not permitted to reveal the character's identity. Ste Hay (Kieron Richardson) and Amy Barnes (Ashley Slanina-Davies) "take an instant fancy" to Ally, who is not aware of their interest in him. O'Connor explained "The whole thing is pretty innocent to start off with, but it quickly gets more complicated when Ste and Amy make it their mission to find out whether Ally is gay or straight." On-screen there is mystery surrounding Ally's sexuality and Ste and Amy are "both being ultra nice and saying suggestive things to him". O'Connor stated that he knows Ally's sexuality, but Hollyoaks producers told him to keep it a secret. Richardson revealed that he was "very heavily involved" in Ally's introduction to the show. O'Connor told Kilkelly that Ally would become attracted to either Ste or Amy. Ally is revealed to be heterosexual, and he asks Amy out on a date before he returns to the army. O'Connor told a writer from Soaplife "They had a couple of dates and they're now in the thick of a relationship." The actor added that Ally is "besotted" with Amy.

Ally is "not bothered" that Amy and Ste have two children, Leah Barnes (Ela-May Demircan) and Lucas Hay (Reuben Thwaites), together as he "likes kids". O'Connor told a writer from Soaplife that Ste does not want Ally to be a father figure to the Leah and Lucas. O'Connor said "I think Ste's feeling protective." Ste interrupts Ally and Amy whilst they are on a date and asks Ally what his intentions towards Amy are. Of this, O'Connor commented "Ally's a bit frustrated, but he understands why Ste feels he needs to look after Amy." Ally tells Ste he wants a "committed relationship" with Amy and that he "fell for her" the first time they met.

In May 2012, Amy tells Ally that their relationship is progressing too fast. Amy then has a one-night stand with Dodger (Danny Mac). Ally returns to see Amy the next day and hopes they can reconcile. He is unaware of her fling with Dodger, who hides on Ally's arrival. Amy refuses to reconcile to get Ally out of the flat. Amy goes on a road trip to forget about her problems, but is unaware that Dodger's cousin, Dennis Savage (Joe Tracini), has invited both Dodger and Ally on the trip.

=== Secret ===
When the character of Ally was announced, it was revealed that he has a "dark past" that would be "uncovered eventually in true soap style". In January 2012, O'Connor admitted that he did not know Ally's secret and that the storyline was still being developed. O'Connor said "I've been told that [the secret is] a good one" and added that it would probably shock people. The actor opined that the secret would cause conflict between Ally and other character's. O'Connor later commented that the secret would produce a "very big, meaty storyline". In June 2012, it was reported that Lynsey Nolan (Karen Hassan) would discover that there may be a "mystery connection" between Ally and newcomer, Walker (Neil Newbon). Lynsey sees Walker threatening Ally to keep quiet about their past and decides to investigate them. O'Connor told Matthew Wright of The Wright Stuff that Ally would lose his "strait-laced good boy" reputation.

During the episode broadcast on 29 June 2012, Lynsey is found dead by Brendan Brady (Emmett J. Scanlan). The death sparked a whodunnit storyline, with Ally in the frame for Lynsey's murder. Digital Spy explained Ally's motives stating, "Additionally, [Ally] and bad boy [Walker] had both found themselves struggling to keep their secrets from an inquisitive Lynsey in recent episodes - providing them with a reason to target her." A promotional image featuring Ally was later released by Hollyoaks which confirmed Ally as an official suspect in the mystery.

=== The Kane family ===
In October 2012, Digital Spy's Kilkelly reported that Hollyoaks had planned scenes involving Ally and Lacey Kane (Georgia Bourke) growing close. O'Connor told a writer from Inside Soap that Ally feels "put out" by Martha's return. She is "out to expose Ally" at a time he was beginning to become liked by the Kanes. Lacey develops a crush on Ally after she steals Ash's credit card and he covers for her. The duo fall to the ground and stare at each other during a game of football. The actor explained that "there's a split second where there is something" between them. Ally gains control over the Kane household because of his encounter with Lacey. O'Connor concluded that Ally has a "hero complex" and "goes about everything the wrong way".

== Storylines ==
Jacqui McQueen and Rhys Ashworth advertise for a lodger, and Ally replies to the advertisement. Jacqui and Rhys interview Ally and subsequently allow him to move in. Ally meets his neighbours, Ste Hay and Amy Barnes, and invites them over for a dinner party. Ally is unimpressed when Jacqui and Amy become drunk and ruin the party. Ally considers moving out when Jacqui and Rhys continuously argue. Ally kisses Mercedes McQueen (Jennifer Metcalfe) and asks her out on a date, but she declines. Ally goes on the date with Mercedes' sister, Michaela McQueen (Hollie-Jay Bowes), instead. Ally becomes annoyed when Michaela and Amy argue as they are both attracted to him. Ally tells Michaela and Amy that he does not want to date either of them. Jacqui and Rhys' new lodger, Phoebe Jackson (Mandip Gill), steals Ally's laptop and Jacqui refuses to report Phoebe to the police. Jacqui and Rhys pay Ally the amount the laptop was worth and he moves out. Ally asks Amy out on a date before returning to the army.

Ally returns; he and Amy begin a relationship. Ally hopes to spend time alone with Amy, but Ste interrupts them and questions Ally's intentions towards Amy. Amy tells Ally that their relationship is moving to fast and he leaves for the night. The next day, Ally attempts to reunite with Amy, unaware that she has had a one-night stand with Dodger. Amy refuses, and goes on a road trip to forget about her problems. Amy is unaware that Dodger's cousin, Dennis Savage (Joe Tracini), has invited both Dodger and Ally on the trip. Dennis hopes to reconcile Ally and Amy. Ally learns that Amy and Dodger had sex, and attacks Dodger. Ally refuses to forgive Amy and returns to the village. Ally and Amy later reunite.

Ally sees Walker and recognises him as "Nick" from the army. Walker tells Ally he is mistaken. Walker threatens Ally not to reveal their history to anyone, which Lynsey Nolan witnesses. Lynsey decides to investigate Ally and follows him to a strip club. Lynsey confronts Ally and they argue when she threatens to tell Amy. Ste overhears them arguing and decides to tell Amy. Lynsey is later found dead. Ste tells Amy about Ally and Lynsey's argument. Ally and Lynsey's argument was witnessed and the police question Ally about Lynsey's death. Amy provides an alibi for Ally, telling the police that they were together at the time Lynsey was murdered. Ally tells Amy he was at a strip club when Lynsey was murdered. Ally explains that he visits strip clubs to look out for the strippers, as his sister was a stripper and was raped by two customers. A stripper at the club verifies Ally's story to Amy and Ste. Amy tells Ally she cannot trust him and leaves. Ally then pays the stripper for covering for him. When Will Savage (James Atherton) is accused of being Lynsey's murderer, Ally leads a hate campaign against him. Ally befriends Ash Kane (Holly Weston) and they both help prove Will's innocence. Ally and Ash later share a kiss. Ally tells Amy about the kiss, explaining that he has Post traumatic stress disorder and was having a panic attack when the kiss happened. Ally then ends his relationship with Amy and moves out. Ash allows Ally to stay with her. He then later sustains a relationship with Ash, and this angers Amy- so soon after they separated.

Ally moves in with the Kane's and creates a rift between Martha (Carli Norris) and her children. Martha leaves the family home after an argument with Ash leaving the family struggling. Ally begins helping the family and moves in. Lacey (Georgia Bourke) develops romantic feelings for Ally and persistently tries to get his attention. Lacey tries to seduce Ally and he agrees to have sex with her. Lacey's friend Phoebe becomes concerned when she realises Lacey's attentions and quickly notifies Martha, who interrupts Lacey and Ally. Ash and Callum (Laurie Duncan) return home at the same time and Ally fails to explain the situation. He is later arrested for identity fraud as he had been using the identity of a dead army soldier and trying to work his way into the Kane family.

== Reception ==
Inside Soap's Sarah Ellis did not agree with a viewer's criticism of O'Connor's acting, commenting that the actor had been doing a "stellar job" of portraying Ally. Anthony D. Langford writing for AfterElton stated "I see the show is trying to make Ally interesting by tying him into Brendan and Walker's storyline. But the character is so dull and so underwritten I don't see how it can help." A reporter for the Liverpool Echo said "Ever since smooth-talking Ally strolled into Hollyoaks village, the suave Aussie has managed to charm his way into most of the locals' good books - but what do they really know about him? Very little, it would appear..." Carena Crawford from Reveal branded the character as a "shady Australian". Laura Morgan from All About Soap questioned the point of the character following his departure, saying "Considering we'd waited the best part of a year to discover this news, we were left a bit cold by Ally's big reveal. For a character that had a lot more potential, he was given a hurried and anticlimactic exit. In fact, Ash kneeing him in the nuts might have been the most exciting thing about the whole thing!"
