= Callum Kane =

UK soap opera character, created 2011

- Hollyoaks character
- Portrayed by: Laurie Duncan
- Duration: 2011–2013
- First appearance: 6 September 2011
- Last appearance: 10 October 2013
- Introduced by: Gareth Philips
- Spin-off appearances: Hollyoaks Later (2013)
In-universe information
- Occupation: Student
- Mother: Martha Kane
- Sisters: Ash Kane; Lacey Kane

Callum Kane is a fictional character from the British Channel 4 soap opera Hollyoaks, played by Laurie Duncan. The character and Duncan's casting was announced on 25 August 2011. Callum was introduced to the show along with five other regular characters. He made his first screen appearance during the episode broadcast on 6 September 2011. While appearing in the sixth series of Hollyoaks Later in October 2013, Callum was killed off. His exit came as part of a "cast cull", which coincided with the show's 18th anniversary. Duncan's departure from the show was kept secret to ensure viewers would be surprised. The actor later admitted that he cried when he learned that he was leaving.

Callum was portrayed as loyal, moody and clever. He was not into socialising and did not care what anyone else thought of him. Duncan thought Callum was a bit of a mystery, especially as he was introverted and often preferred to spend his time reading and watching European cinema. Duncan was pleased when Callum's family were introduced, as they helped to give an insight into why Callum is the way he is. Callum got on well with his sisters, but had a difficult relationship with his alcoholic mother Martha (Carli Norris). Other storylines saw Callum befriend homeless student George Smith (Steven Roberts), embark on a relationship with Maddie Morrison (Scarlett Bowman) and almost dying after being shot during a robbery. The character was well received by critics.

== Casting ==
On 25 August 2011, Rebecca Davies from Digital Spy announced that Callum Kane would be introduced to Hollyoaks, along with five new regular characters. Channel 4 released a promotional video of the new characters spraying each other with paints and dancing around a studio. Duncan received the role of Callum a few months after he appeared in an episode of Law & Order: UK. He said he was enjoying working on set and had made some good friends.

== Development ==
=== Characterisation ===
A writer for the official Hollyoaks website said Callum was both loyal and compassionate. He would always help out someone in need and tries to do the right thing. The writer observed that Callum was moody, clever and "a little bit gloomy." While Duncan described his character as being "a bit of a mystery man." Callum does not care what anyone else thinks. He does not enjoy socialising or being perceived as a cool guy. Duncan said "I think, most of the time, Callum is the kind of character who just doesn't really want to be bothered by anything or anyone. He wants to do his own thing, get on with his own life, and he's very introverted." Callum often prefers to spend his time reading and watching European cinema. Duncan revealed that he chose to do some research for that aspect of his character's personality and began to read much poetry. Callum reads much Bukowski and Duncan told Elizabeth Horsfall from AGENT2 Magazine that he chose to read some of Bukowski's works and had not put the book down for three days. When asked if Callum was similar to him, Duncan replied that he talks all the time, whilst Callum prefers to be quiet. He also thought they were both nice people, but Callum was "a bit more intense" than himself.

=== Family ===
"Ash and Callum both really interest me. They're quite reserved and they keep themselves to themselves, so I think we have to explore where they come from and their family life in order to understand why they are the way they are. We'll be exploring them a lot more."

— Producer Emma Smithwick on Callum and Ash (2011)

Callum was the first member of the Kane family to arrive on-screen. His older sister, Ash (Holly Weston), was introduced a couple of weeks later. Duncan stated that Callum loved his sister and although he would not admit it, she was probably his best friend. He added that Ash had helped him out a lot over the years. Series producer, Emma Smithwick, commented that Callum and Ash both had "a mysterious quality" about them and she was interested in exploring their history and backstory. Smithwick explained that this involved expanding the family, by bringing in some "satellite family members" and characters to facilitate it.

Callum's mother, Martha (Carli Norris), and younger sister, Lacey (Georgia Bourke), were later introduced to the show. Duncan described Callum's relationship with Lacey as being "love-hate" and said that Callum tries to be a father figure to her, which annoys Lacey. Duncan was happy that the Kane family was being expanded and thought it gave "a big insight into everything that Callum has been through before." The family's history helped explain why Callum behaved the way he did. The Kane family were brought together when Ash contracted meningitis, which panicked Callum. Weston believed that the storyline showed just how close Callum was to his sister. The storyline also revealed that Martha suffered with an alcohol problem. Without Ash around, Callum had to deal with Martha, which proved to be difficult. Weston explained "You'll see why Ash and Callum moaned about Martha before. They've always hinted at Martha being a bit of a nightmare mum, but the viewers have never really understood why. So now you get a good picture of that." Norris later revealed that Ash, Callum and Lacey's father was a rich archaeologist, who lived in Dubai.

Callum became so fed up with his mother's drinking that he locked her in a cupboard, which led to his arrest. After attending a support group for teenager's with alcoholic parents, Callum became frustrated that Ash did not believe their mother had a drinking problem. Duncan explained that Ash was in denial because she had not been at home to see bad things were and how much Callum was struggling. When Martha covers Ash's shift at the local nightclub, she supplies Lacey and her friend with alcohol, while drinking herself. After Callum saw the CCTV footage, he fought with Ash, got drunk and locked Martha in a cupboard. He was then "stunned" when the police turned up to arrest him. Duncan commented "He's confused when the police nick him, and he realises that he's behaved in the way his mum might." Callum spent the night in the cells, where he realised that he had gone about things in the wrong way.

Callum became concerned when Ash began dating Ally Gorman (Dan O'Connor) and moved him into the Kane home. Duncan told an Inside Soap columnist "Callum knows that something isn't right about Ally. This guy has come in and fairly intruded on the Kane family. Callum's quite certain that Ally really hasn't got their best interests at heart, and wants to know more." When Ally threw Martha out of her house, Callum asked George to help him find some "dirt" on Ally and they find two letters addressed to a "Dave Burns" - who turned out to be Ally. Realising Ally was not who he said he was, Callum presented his findings to the Kane family, but Ally managed to talk his way out of the situation.

=== Helping George Smith ===
When Callum was paired up with fellow sixth-form student George (Steven Roberts) on a college presentation, they became friends. Callum later discovered that George was squatting due to being homeless. Callum agreed to keep George's secret, but he became "increasingly concerned" about George and his health. He was also wary of George's squat-mate Phoebe Jackson (Mandip Gill), who did not like him interfering, especially when he wanted to stay over. Speaking to Kilkelly about why Callum was keen to help George, Duncan stated "I think Callum just thinks that George is a really nice person. Callum is very caring deep down, and he can obviously see that George is in a lot of trouble. Because of that, he really wants to help out and make sure that George is okay." Duncan and Roberts visited a Centrepoint service in London to research homelessness, which they both found useful for the storyline. Duncan was glad to be part of a hard-hitting storyline like youth homelessness, especially as the subject was not being tackled elsewhere in the film or television industry at the time.

Callum later took George home with him and allowed him to stay with his family, as things were getting dangerous on the streets. When the Kane family prepare to move house, George becomes worried about what that means for him, but Callum was keen for him to stay with his family. Duncan said "Callum keeps trying to talk him round, though, as he's really quite eager to get George away from the streets and into a stable structure again." Duncan also revealed that Callum was aware that George had a crush on him, especially because George would stare intently at him, but Callum was not bothered. Duncan thought the storyline with George had been good for his character, as it showed a more human side to his personality and viewers realised that Callum was not "just an empty shell." Duncan stated that George's homeless storyline was his favourite and praised Roberts.

=== Relationship with Maddie Morrison ===
Callum's first love interest was Maddie Morrison (Scarlett Bowman). In a November 2011 interview published in OK!, Bowman confirmed that Maddie and Callum would grow closer and she branded them "an unlikely couple". The actress said Maddie would really fall for Callum and show her vulnerability at the same time. In the same interview, Duncan said Callum was not desperate for a relationship, due to being introverted, but he becomes "alluring" to the girls. When Callum and Maddie go head-to-head in a college debate, there are "sparks" between them. During a night out, Maddie tries to make Callum jealous by flirting with Joel Dexter (Andrew Still), but when her evening ended badly, Callum came to her rescue and they ended up sharing their first kiss. Duncan thought Callum and Maddie made a good match, despite their different personalities. He told Kilkelly that Maddie brought out Callum's fun side, while Callum tried to help Maddie escape the image she was hiding behind and make her less bitchy. Duncan thought Callum would not be happy if he caught Maddie being rude to people and believed Callum would definitely let Maddie know about his feelings.

The couple were soon referred to by the portmanteau "Caddie" and a writer for the official Hollyoaks website branded them the "hottest new couple in Chester." Smithwick also thought Callum and Maddie had good chemistry together, which is why they came to the forefront more than other characters. Bowman reckoned Callum was "really good" for Maddie and his personality helped ground her. The actress also thought her character could learn a lot from Callum, who she was "really into". During the beginning of Callum and Maddie's relationship, Maddie imposed a three-month sex ban, which Callum agreed to. When the three months was up, Maddie became uncomfortable and avoided being alone with Callum. Bowman told Sugar's Lauren Franklin, "She's so into him but really worried she'll disappoint." Due to being on edge, Maddie turned nasty with Callum and disliked him touching and looking at her. When Callum and Maddie did eventually have sex, Maddie realised that it was not as bad as what she had imagined. Callum made the moment special for them, by making the room romantic. However, Maddie's "trust is thrown back into disarray" when Callum had to suddenly leave her.

=== Shooting ===
In May 2013, Callum was shot during an armed robbery at the local convenience store Price Slice. The storyline started when Callum discovered that his family were facing eviction and needed three months worth of rent. When he learned Robbie Roscoe (Charlie Wernham) and Finn O'Connor (Keith Rice) were planning to take the shop's takings, he decided to join in. However, Callum pulled out at the last minute after finding out Robbie was planning to use a gun during the robbery. Callum watched on "helplessly" from outside as Robbie and Finn entered the shop, but when Darren Osborne (Ashley Taylor Dawson) went inside with his young son, Callum panicked. Callum tried to wrestle the gun away from Robbie, but was shot in the struggle. Robbie and Finn left the shop, leaving Callum fighting for his life. He was rushed to the hospital where a crash team had to save his life.

=== Departure and death ===
In October 2013, Callum appeared in the sixth series of Hollyoaks Later, where he and some friends went on holiday to a house in the country. The character was killed off as part of a "cast cull", which coincided with the show's 18th anniversary celebrations. Duncan's departure from the show was kept secret, ensuring viewers were surprised when Callum was murdered. The storyline saw Callum try to rescue an imprisoned Esther Bloom (Jazmine Franks), only for him to be fatality stabbed through the chest with a Samurai sword by Jade Hedy (Lucy Gape). Duncan tweeted about his departure from the show, saying he cried when he found out he was leaving. A behind the scenes video featuring the filming of Callum's exit was later released by Channel 4.

== Storylines ==
Callum first appears where he starts Hollyoaks sixth form college, he is seen as quiet and weird. He later meets Maddie Morrison (Scarlett Bowman), and he partners up with her to work on a project. Maddie soon develops feelings for Callum and they show their affections for each other by insulting one another. During a night out Callum spots Maddie with Joel Dexter (Andrew Still) and is jealous, after Maddie has a row with Joel, Callum walked her home where they later kissed each other, but Maddie ignored him the next day. Maddie tells Tilly Evans (Lucy Dixon) and George Smith (Steven Roberts) about the night and they later attempt to set them up by locking them together in the stock room they begin talking to each other and become good friends. The next day, Callum and Maddie get into a taxi and skip college and go on a date to the park and go cloud watching, they get on well until Callum talks nasty about Maddie's friends Tilly and George. They have another argument, but later make up once they arrive back. Callum later decides to end his relationship with Maddie.

Callum struggles to cope when his mother, Martha (Carli Norris) drinking causes her to behave erratically. He tells her that she has to stop drinking or she may lose her the support of her family. She carries on drinking and Callum decides to get drunk too. He smashes his living room up, pushes Ash over and is arrested. He blames Martha and she promises to stop drinking. He manages to convince Martha to seek help but she soon begins drinking again. Callum takes a dislike to Ash's new boyfriend Ally Gorman (Daniel O'Connor) and tries to find more information about him. He discovers that he had been in a relationship with numerous women under a different identity. When Callum sets Ally up so Ash knows the truth, Ally talks his way out of the predicament. Callum becomes reluctant to let Martha back into his life after they evicted her from her own home. He attends a support group for children of alcoholics and listens to Martha's story.

When Maddie is killed in a mini bus crash, Callum attends her funeral and tells his mum he will lay some flowers down by her grave. A week later, Callum finds out about his sister, Lacey's secret romance with Ally. This angers Callum making him hit Ally and get angry with Lacey. Following Ally's arrest for fraud, Callum and his sisters agree that their mum can come back and live with them. In March 2013, headmaster Patrick Blake (Jeremy Sheffield) assign new student Robbie Roscoe (Charlie Wernham) to Callum's guidance, but they both discover he is trouble. Callum, in need for money to pay their rent, agrees to rob Price Slice with Robbie and Finn O'Connor (Keith Rice) but changes his mind. The robbery goes ahead but as Callum tries to stop it he is shot in the leg. In hospital he flatlines but is revived.

Callum begins a relationship with Holly Cunningham (Wallis Day), to the anger of her mum - Cindy and upset of Jason Roscoe, Holly's friend. In October 2013, Callum goes with Jade Hedy (Lucy Gape), Holly, Tilly and Esther Bloom (Jazmine Franks) to Jade's uncle's countryside house for Esther's 18th birthday. While there, Jade is shown to have a killer streak and later attempts to kill Esther. Callum tries saving her but Jade kills him when she stabs him in the back with a samaurai sword. Jade later accidentally stabs herself while in a fight with Esther and Tilly and dies. A few days later, Callum's sister Ash is killed in an explosion in Hollyoaks village.

== Reception ==
A writer for the show's official website stated "He's tall, he's dark, he's arrogant, he's maddeningly enigmatic. All in all, Callum's a dreamboat. But what exactly is he keeping under that proverbial hat?" A writer for MSN TV branded the character "clean-cut Callum". While an OK! reporter called him a "swoon-some yet enigmatic heart-throb" and observed that he had been "setting hearts a-flutter in the common room ever since his arrival." Laura Morgan from All About Soap called Maddie and Callum's relationship "the sexiest thing in Hollyoaks." Morgan did not think "Caddie" should work because "she's the blonde queen bee worshipped by her adoring posse, and he's the dark brooding intellect sat in the corner with head stuck in a poetry book. But it does work, and what's more, it's hot!" Morgan opined that Callum and Maddie had great chemistry and thought that if they did not look so good together, she probably would not be rooting for them.

During the George storyline, Anthony D. Langford, writing for TheBacklot.com, questioned whether the show was building up to revealing that Callum was bisexual and thought a love triangle between George, Maddie and Callum would be a great story. He continued "Callum and George's scenes are very sweet, and I like that Callum has done so much to boost George's self confidence and looks out for him." All About Soap's Morgan bemoaned the effect Martha's behaviour was having on Callum, saying "Cal might be the only man chez Kane (sorry, George!) but is it really his responsibility to manage Martha's finances? Answer: no!" After Martha lost her job, Morgan thought Callum could "kiss goodbye" to his dreams of studying abroad. She added that when Martha turns to drink again "we bet you anything it'll be left to Callum to pick up the pieces".

Following Callum's exit, Langford commented "I hate that the show killed off Callum. I think they wasted his character and he had such potential." Rebecca Bowden from Yahoo! commented that during his final episodes Callum acted "like an absolute idiot" and it made her start to hate him, citing Callum's reaction to Holly's ordeal and his lack of care for others as her reason for this, although she added that Callum had never been a favourite character of hers. Bowden felt that Callum's death was a shock, noting that the graphic nature would not have suited the pre-watershed main show. She added that she was glad to see Callum die a hero, although she thought that during the series he "lost his personality for a little while".
