= Ash Kane =

UK soap opera character, created 2011

- Hollyoaks character
- Portrayed by: Holly Weston
- Duration: 2011–2013
- First appearance: 26 September 2011
- Last appearance: 16 October 2013
- Introduced by: Gareth Philips
In-universe information
- Occupation: Student; Barmaid (2012–2013)
- Mother: Martha Kane
- Brothers: Callum Kane
- Sisters: Lacey Kane

Ash Kane is a fictional character from the British Channel 4 soap opera Hollyoaks, played by Holly Weston. Ash debuted on-screen on 26 September 2011. Weston attended a late audition for the role and was later told she had secured the part. Weston was signed to the serial on an initial six-month contract, which was later extended by impressed producers.

Ash is characterised as a rebellious, partying "rock chick", either spending her time drunk or hungover. Weston has vented that her character is also caring and wise. During her time on the show Ash has been involved in a friendship with Will Savage (James Atherton) which developed into a "will they, won't they?" style relationship. Ash was introduced along with brother Callum (Laurie Duncan). Her background and behaviour was explored following the introduction of her mother Martha Kane (Carli Norris) and sister Lacey Kane (Georgia Bourke). To further explore the family, a storyline in which Ash contracts meningitis was devised. After the character's introduction she was voted fans favourite fresher in a poll run by Digital Spy. For her portrayal of Ash, Weston was nominated for "Best Actress" at The British Soap Awards 2012 and TV Choice Awards. Ash left the show on 16 October 2013 after being killed-off in an explosion as part of the show's 18th anniversary.

== Creation and casting ==
The character was created as one of five new students who arrive to study at Hollyoaks Community College. Ash was the last new student to be cast into the series, with Holly Weston securing the part. Weston said the audition and screen test was very "last minute". After her final screen test, Weston went on holiday and was informed that she had secured the role and was required to return to Liverpool to begin filming. For the role Weston later relocated to Liverpool where the serial is filmed. Weston said she and the other new cast members were initially signed to a six-month contract, which was a "trial period". Producers later decided to keep the character on. Weston said that when she first read about the character she was "really excited". She said it was "great" to get the part as she could not ask for a better character. Weston added that she had initial reservations about securing the part as eight other actresses attended the screen test for the role with one of the actresses having previously attended several other auditions. Entertainment website Digital Spy first announced the character of Ash on 5 September 2011. The Hollyoaks press office said that the collective are "possibly the coolest set of students ever to land in the Chester village". They "shake things up" and embark on a journey through "life's hardest lessons". Their first week on the programme has been touted the "most fun and cringe-worthy Freshers' weeks of all time".

== Development ==
=== Characterisation ===
She’s a really cool character. She's really fun to play because she doesn’t have any high heels, doesn’t care what she looks like – I get to wear messy makeup all the time, which is cool. She’s a bit of a rock chick, makes her different from some of the other characters.

— Holly Weston on Ash.

She was initially described as a "wild party girl" and a "rock chick and rebel". E4.com described Ash stating that when she is around, "things get wild". You will never find Ash opting for a night indoors unless there is "alcohol, heavy metal and ill advised flashing" involved. Though Ash feels guilty over her antics the next morning, she convinces herself that it is part of the university student lifestyle. Ash has a brother, Callum Kane (Laurie Duncan) who she attempts to play the "responsible older sister" for.

Weston has described Ash as "a bit of a child". She explained that her character "gets drunk a lot" and is "always hungover! She just wants to have a good time really". However, she opined that Ash actually has more depth to her persona, explaining that underneath the partying she has got "a bit of a heart" and has her "head screwed on". While she is attempting to have a good time, she also studies psychology, so she is "sussing everyone out". Weston said that Ash starts to have a "little play with people" because she knows what "they're thinking before they do". However at first, viewers do not realise she studies the subject because of the way she acts. Ash embarrasses herself during her first week because she drinks to much alcohol, so she "regrets it" afterwards, Weston added that real life university freshers can identify with the way she feels. Weston later gave advice to the National Union of Students, stating that new freshers should surround themselves with friends if they are going to go out drinking. She noted that Ash does not get into "unsafe situations because she surrounds herself with her new-found friends". Weston added that Ash is "independent" and is not tied down in a relationship. She explained that her character "doesn’t go in" for romances and instead is "out to have a laugh and be round her friends". Weston said that she loves that Ash just "doesn't care". She explained that when she first got the role on the serial she "wondered whether I'd have to wear loads of make-up, be dolled up all the time and wear heels! But it's really nice to be a little bit different. It's fun to play a cooler, messier character". Weston commented that she and the character have their similarities, although she wishes she had the "guts" to carry out "some things that Ash does" and she is not as wild as her on screen persona.

=== Relationships and friendships ===
Ash immediately strikes up a friendship with Will Savage (James Atherton), however he is in a relationship with Theresa McQueen (Jorgie Porter). Theresa becomes jealous of Will's new formed friendships, Porter said that Theresa "notices his growing bond with Ash" and she soon realises "she is not his number one priority anymore" when he opts to go partying with Ash and the freshers over meeting Theresa. Weston said that she read initial viewer reactions to Ash via internet forums. She said she felt worried because Ash was criticised, as viewers thought she was going to steal Will away from Theresa. She also cringed when she watched her first scenes with Will, because she was trying to "put on a sexy voice" on. Weston has said that Ash begins to hope the pair could become more than friends but she is unsure what Will thinks on the situation. She said that the storyline becomes a "kind of a 'will they, won't they?' scenario". Weston was unsure how Will would react towards Ash's feelings although she said Will "seems to care" for Ash. Atherton also explained that the spark could be explored further. He added that the romance has been "underlying" since Ash and Will met and has been "continuing to brew" as the storyline progresses. Weston later said that there is some kind of "hidden romance" between Ash and Will. She said that the "balance always hits one way or the other" with the pairing, adding that during the storyline in which Ash helps Will organise a festival, viewers see "what Ash thinks about the situation". Although Weston had previously thought Will liked Ash more than she liked him, she said it may now "be going the other way".

Ash and Annalise Appleton (Tamaryn Payne) meet through Will. Weston explained that although the pair are not best friends they "get on strangely well, considering they both pretend that they can’t stand each other!" The characters "wind each other up" and at times Annalise is "really horrible" towards Ash, but Weston felt that Ash realises Annalise does not mean it which prevents her from snapping at Annalise. Payne added that the relationships starts off "very rocky" but it progresses to a "love/hate – or even more of a love/love" relationship. She explained that Annalise cares about Ash but she finds her to be a "bit intimidating, because Ash gets on well with the guys really naturally, but Annalise doesn’t. Ash has got something that Annalise hasn't, she's just cool, and finds everything a bit easier". Weston explained that the pair argue, with one occasion when the pair "really get to each other" leading to Ash calling Annalise a bitch which differs from their usual "snide comments" to each other. Payne added that during the argument the pair "both said everything that they thought of each other, really nasty stuff!" She commented that she enjoys filming scenes with the two characters due to her real life friendship with Weston.

=== Extension of family and meningitis ===
Ash is introduced along with brother Callum. Hollyoaks' executive producer Emma Smithwick said that the siblings are "quite reserved and they keep themselves to themselves" which she felt needed to be explained. She felt that to explore the reasoning behind their behaviour viewers would need to learn more about "where they come from and their family life" which would involve introducing "satellite" family members. The character's background was explored via the introduction of her family. Weston welcomed the growth of the Kane family because of their similarities, with each one having "dark and moody" traits. Weston said she would like to further explore the family saying that "there’s definitely a lot of hidden stuff there that we haven’t seen yet, especially with the dad, who we don’t really know much about". Duncan said that Callum and Ash have always got on well and he "loves his sister very, very much". He added that Ash is Callum's best friend as she has helped him through a lot "over the years".

On 20 March 2012 Digital Spy reported that the serial would explore the Kane family when Ash collapses and is diagnosed with meningitis. For the storyline Weston conducted research on the subject as she was unsure how Ash would be affected while she had the illness and she wanted to portray the role with realism. Hollyoaks worked closely with Meningitis trust when developing the storyline, with the trust aiming to raise awareness of meningitis in young adults. Weston backed Meningitis UK's Trust Your Instincts campaign which aims to raise awareness of symptoms, with the actress portraying Ash as having some of the "classic symptoms" during the storyline. Weston explained that in the buildup Ash returns from a night out and everybody "just think she's drunk. So she wakes up with a hangover, which is so typical of Ash, and everyone's ignoring her while she's going: 'No, I feel really ill, and I didn't drink that much.' Then she's on the floor and they call the ambulance. [...] it's quite serious, because they induce a coma". Weston explained that Ash's illness is the bacterial meningitis which is "really serious - you can die within a few hours of getting it". Ash becomes comatose with the illness. Weston said that she found these scenes difficult to film despite her presumption that the scenes would be "easy". She explained that the scenes were difficult as she found it hard to lie straight, stay awake and be aware of what was happening around her. Ash recovers and wakes from her coma.

During the storyline, Ash's family are affected in different ways. Weston revealed that the serial build up to the storyline by having Ash argue with her sister, Lacey (Georgia Bourke), so that when Ash becomes ill Lacey would feel guilty. When Ash is hospitalised her mother, Martha (Carli Norris), is also affected and does not cope well, forcing Callum to take over his mother's duties. Norris explained that although Martha would "die for her children" she is like a child herself and when she is required to support her family she can not handle it. Weston expressed that during the storyline viewers would see why Ash and Callum moan about Martha, explaining that viewers discover she has an alcohol problem. On how Callum is affected, Weston said that they are close as brother and sister which is proved within the storyline. She said that they usually pretend like they do not get on and Ash speaks to Callum like he is "the annoying little brother" but "underneath it all, you can see how much they care about each other". Weston felt that it was nice to explore a new side of their relationship during the storyline.

== Storylines ==
Ash arrives during Freshers Week at the HCC, where she meets Will Savage (James Atherton). They make friends and she accompanies him back to his new student accommodation. She meets his roommates Annalise Appleton (Tamaryn Payne), Rob Edwards (David Atkins), Barney Harper-McBride (Tom Scurr) and Scott Sabeka (Calvin Denba). She goes out drinking with them and when Ash and Rob do dares in the SU Bar, she strips and takes her bra off in front of the crowd. The next morning Ash is upset with her behaviour, however, she carries on partying for the rest of the week with her new friends. She starts spending time with Will, which makes his girlfriend Theresa McQueen (Jorgie Porter) jealous. She also clashes with Annalise over her behaviour and rapport with Rob. Ash is forced to admit she still lives at home with her family and her brother, Callum Kane (Laurie Duncan), disapproves of her wild behaviour. Ash later goes out drinking with Annalise, where she decides she can find herself a one-night stand. She chooses Riley Costello (Rob Norbury), who has just discovered that his fiancé Mercedes Fisher (Jennifer Metcalfe) has been having an affair with his father Carl Costello (Paul Opacic) on their wedding day. She has sex with Riley in the toilets and is horrible to him when he regrets it. Ash later moves in with her friends. Ash starts to resent Will's behaviour when he starts to hang around with his rugby teammates.

Ash wakes up from a night of drinking and thinks that she is hungover. She then collapses and is taken into hospital, where her family are told that she has meningitis. Ash recovers from her illness. Will plans a musical festival and promises a famous headliner in order to secure money for his family. Ash helps Will organise the event but when the festival begins she realises he does not have a headliner and attempts to persuade him to tell the audience. Will's event is saved by his cousin Dennis Savage (Joe Tracini). Lynsey Nolan (Karen Hassan) is murdered in a similar fashion to Silas Blissett's (Jeff Rawle) victims. Silas claims Will is his accomplice and the police discover Will has documents relating to Silas on his laptop and Lynsey's ring in his possession. Will is charged with her murder but released on bail. Ash supports Will, maintaining her view that Will would not hurt anyone. She convinces Will's brother Dodger Savage (Danny Mac) to speak to Will. When several villagers begin a hate campaign against Will, Ash decides she needs to convince Silas to tell the truth. She decides to visit him at the psychiatric hospital he is incarcerated in. Ash questions Will, asking him where he was when Lynsey was murdered. She discovers Will had been carrying out tasks for Silas including stealing Lynsey's ring and meeting a girl online and gaining her trust. She learns that after Will gained the trust of a girl he met up with her and filmed her. Ash tells Will that she does not believe he killed Lynsey but she no longer wants to help him due to his actions.

Ash started a relationship with conman Ally Gorman (Dan O'Connor) which ended when Callum and their mother, Martha Kane (Carli Norris), caught him in bed with their younger sister, Lacey Kane (Georgia Bourke). Ash begins a relationship with Will after his wife, Texas Longford (Bianca Hendrickse-Spendlove) is murdered on their wedding day. When he discovered Ash's patient list he saw his mother Anna Blake's (Saskia Wickham) name on there which angered him. He took her on a picnic near cliffs and when he "dropped" his phone and asked Ash to pick it up he stood up behind her, ready to push her off but changed his mind. He made her quit her placement but Ash decided to continue seeing Anna.

Ash finds out that Will can in fact walk and that he killed Texas and Anna so she locks herself in the bathroom so that he does not hurt her. As she screams for help, Will kicks down the door. She runs past him in an attempt to escape but Will quickly grabs her, pins her to the floor and tries to strangle her. He is stopped however as Dodger interrupts them, and Ash quickly gets to her feet and says she hates Will. An explosion from Ste Hay (Kieron Richardson) and Doug Carter's (PJ Brennan) leaving party below then explodes into the Kanes' flat. As Will gains consciousness and runs over to Ash and tells her he is sorry and that he loves her, Ash dies in his arms, as she tells Will he is going to hell. A month after Ash's death, Will is arrested for the murders of Texas and Anna.

== Reception ==
For her portrayal of Ash, Weston was nominated for "Best Actress" at the 2012 British Soap Awards. She later received a "Best Actress" nomination at the 2012 TV Choice Awards. At the 2013 National Television Awards Weston was nominated in the category of "Serial Drama Performance". In a poll run by entertainment website Digital Spy to find readers favourite fresher Ash won, receiving 40.6% of the vote.

An OK! columnist described Ash and Annalise as "two of the most popular new ‘fresher’ students", saying that the pair have one of the serial's "most fascinating and combustible combinations!" They opined that the characters had kept them "glued to the screen" with their "bitchy arguments". Soaplife's Brockway said "for a psychology student, Ash is pretty slow on the uptake. Not only is her boyfriend a killer, he's tried to finish her off twice and she hasn't even noticed."
