= Steven Roberts (actor) =

British actor

- Occupation: Actor
- Years active: 2011–present
- Television: Hollyoaks

Steven Roberts is a British actor. After finishing theatre school, Roberts was cast in the regular role of George Smith on the British soap opera Hollyoaks in 2011. Roberts was subsequently nominated for several awards for his portrayal of George, including the British Soap Award for Best Actor in 2012. Following his departure from Hollyoaks in 2014, Roberts has focused on theatre productions, including a tour of The History Boys in 2015, The Secret Garden in 2018 and Aladdin between 2018 and 2019. Since 2023, Roberts has starred in various pantomimes at the Cambridge Arts Theatre, including Mother Goose, Cinderella and Sleeping Beauty. Roberts and his colleague Harry Howle won the "Best Sisters" Award at the 2025 Pantomime Awards for their roles in Cinderella.

== Early life ==
Steven Roberts and his parents lived near Lowestoft and they used to visit York often when he was younger. Every Christmas season, Roberts and his family would take the train to see the Norwich pantomime, which sparked Roberts's love of theatre; he called it his "earliest memory of the excitement, singing and dancing". As a child, Roberts took part in several films and theatre productions. As an adult, he went to theatre school, where he took part in theatre productions.

== Career ==
=== Hollyoaks ===
In August 2011, it was announced that Roberts had joined the cast of Hollyoaks as George Smith along with two new characters, Neil Cooper (Tosin Cole) and Callum Kane (Laurie Duncan), as part of the soap's group of six sixth form students, which also included Maddie Morrison (Scarlett Bowman), Tilly Evans (Lucy Dixon) and Jono (Dylan Llewellyn); Roberts's first episode aired on 5 September of that year. Roberts was best friends with his co-star Duncan, with Duncan calling their relationship "pretty inseparable" in February 2012. The role was Roberts's first job after finishing drama school, which he felt very lucky to receive. Discussing his casting, Roberts explained he travelled to Lime Pictures in Liverpool to do his audition as the soap was looking for young new actors as they wanted to introduce several new characters at the same time. During his audition, Roberts acted some scenes and also did a screen test as the casting crew wanted to see how the actors worked with other actors wanting to join the soap. Roberts did not expect to receive the role but later got a call saying he was successful; he later remarked, "before I knew it, I was on my way to Liverpool and the contracts for the show just kept coming. Before I knew it, I had been there for three years. From start to finish, it was a bit of a whirlwind".

During Roberts's time on the soap, George's storylines included romances and flings with Ste Hay (Kieron Richardson), Danny Lomax (Stephen Billington) and Vincent Elegba (John Omole), hiding the fact that he is homeless and living on the streets from his friends, being pushed into prostitution and held captive along with Phoebe McQueen (Mandip Gill) by human traffickers, and being involved in a love triangle with Vincent and Phoebe. Roberts enjoyed working on the soap and liked when George's storylines became more serious; he was excited when he learned about George's homelessness storyline and praised Hollyoaks for raising awareness about homeless teenagers. The soap worked with the charities Centrepoint and Shelter for the storyline. Roberts commented that he did not mind George's unique fashion style but would not wear it himself as it is "too loud" for him. Roberts also liked how George was true to himself and did not hide his homosexuality from his friends. Gill lived with Roberts when they were on the soap, as he had a spare room in his flat, and she praised him for being "an amazing actor". Roberts described Gill as the "nicest person ever" and revealed that she would often give him lifts, and he said in 2018 that the pair were still close friends. In 2012, Roberts was one of several cast members to go on location filming at Abersoch. Roberts enjoyed the experience and commented, "It was a hard week of work, but we had some little chances to let off steam as well". That same year, Roberts was one of several cast members to go on location filming in London for a storyline relating to the magazine Company. Roberts enjoyed the experience and commented that the schedule was "full-on" due to having to film quicker whilst on location. He felt lucky regarding George's storylines and being able to go on location. Roberts also travelled to Derry to film a storyline involving him and several other characters.

For his portrayal of George, Roberts was longlisted for "Best Actor" at the 2012 British Soap Awards. For the same role, he was also nominated for "Best Actor" and "Best Newcomer" at the 2012 TV Choice Awards. Roberts was also longlisted and later shortlisted for "Best Newcomer" at the 2012 Inside Soap Awards. Roberts later left the soap and made his last appearance on 18 September 2014. Of his exit, Roberts said, "I hang up my multi-coloured, furry, patterned ensemble for the last time I'd just like to thank the whole Hollyoaks team and viewers at home for all their support during my time on the show. I've been lucky enough to be part of some great storylines during my time here and, to coin George's favourite word, the past three years have been 'fabulous'. Thank you." In 2018, Roberts revealed in an interview with Inside Soap that viewers of the soap would still sometimes approach him; he also did not rule out a return to the soap, but believed that it was unlikely that the soap would bring his character back due to the lack of connections George has because of the departures of his character's friends.

=== Theatre ===
In December 2014, it was announced that Roberts would play Posner in a revival of The History Boys, produced by Selladoor Worldwide. The production debuted on 26 January 2015 at Palace Theatre, Westcliff-on-Sea before going on tour in various locations in the UK. Roberts believed that the play was "thought-provoking" and called his character in the play slightly "more reserved" than his Hollyoaks character. He commented that he and his castmates got on well together and enjoyed touring to different locations in the UK. Roberts explained that he wanted to do stage work after leaving Hollyoaks due to there being "something about theatre that's very different". Roberts also enjoyed exploring the different sizes of theatres whilst touring, explaining, "Some can feel more intimate and some can feel bigger".

In 2018, Roberts played Colin Craven in Jessica Swale's stage production of The Secret Garden, which ran from 27 July to 25 August at York Theatre Royal. Roberts called the production "lovely" and "magical", and noted that it was really visual due to puppetry being used for the animals in the garden. He also liked the character he portrayed and believed that there was a "freedom" in the roles in the production, explaining that "Just because they're children, they're no less interesting to play. They express all their emotions; they're not filtered. In fact maybe they're heightened". James Ballands from British Theatre Guide wrote that Roberts was "delightfully haughty and odd as the reclusive Colin". Roberts then played the central character in the Theatre Royal's production of Aladdin, which ran from 12 December 2018 to 31 January 2019. Roberts's Hollyoaks co-star, Lucy Dixon, had portrayed the same role a few years prior. Fergus Morgan from The Stage criticised Roberts's performance, commenting that Roberts and his co-star Anna Hannides did not "have the charisma to play the central couple". In April 2020, it was announced that Roberts had joined the cast of the Winter Gardens' musical adaptation of Cinderella as one of the Ugly Sisters. The production was planned to run from 13 December 2020 to 3 January 2021; however, the production was cancelled due to the COVID-19 pandemic in the United Kingdom.

=== Cambridge Arts Theatre roles ===
Roberts portrayed Silly Sammy Goose at the Cambridge Arts Theatre's production of Mother Goose, which ran from 30 November 2023 to 7 January 2024. Robert's performance was praised by British Theatre Guide's John Johnson, who opined that Roberts and his colleague Matt Crosby made a "terrific comedy double-act", adding that their "interactions with the audience during the obligatory game show interview scene are warm and witty". The pair's comedy was also praised by East Midlands Theatre's Lorraine Durrant, who also praised Roberts's "comedic ability whilst still giving his character a vulnerability" and noted that the scene where Roberts and Crosby's characters bake a cake had the "whole audience crying with laughter". The Cambridge Critique's Anne Garvey opined that Roberts did a "a wonderful job" in his role, adding that his character would "make this pantomime special for all the children who will fall for his quiet charm – and energetic slapstick. Well done for an exhausting performance done with sustained brio".

Roberts was then part of the cast of the pantomime Cinderella at the Cambridge Arts Theatre, which ran from 24 November 2024 to 5 January 2025. He portrayed Tess, one of Cinderella's Wicked Stepsisters; the other Stepsister was played by Harry Howle. Zach Lonberg from Varsity opined that Howle and Roberts were "utterly hilarious" as the Stepsisters. Huw Davies from East Midlands Theatre opined that Howle and Roberts "put just the right amount of venom and spite into the wicked stepsisters – they are the pair we love to hate". For their roles as the sisters in the production, Howle and Roberts won the "Best Sisters" Award at the 2025 Pantomime Awards. In response to the award win, Cambridge Arts Theatre wrote on Twitter that they were "absolutely thrilled" for the "adorable" pair, whilst Cambridge News called the actors a "fabulous duo".

Roberts then played Happy Harry in the pantomime production of Sleeping Beauty at the Cambridge Arts Theatre, which ran from 27 November 2025 to 4 January 2026. Roberts rehearsed for the play in a church on Mill Road, Cambridge, whilst renovations were taking place, only moving into the theatre a few days before the show began. The production marked the theatre's reopening following extensive redevelopment, and Roberts said that he was excited to see what had been done with the theatre's renovation and added, "The theatre itself is such a family, I think you can feel it as soon as you step into the theatre [...] I think a lot of people in Cambridge are kind of chomping at the bit to get back to the theatre and we're really honoured to be the first show to open it, and hopefully we open it with a bang." The actor also liked the cast of the production and was glad to be doing Sleeping Beauty as he believed it had not been performed in the theatre for several years. Roberts received praise for his role in the production; Paul Kirkley from Cambridge Independent wrote that Roberts "rallies the kids as lovable lackey Happy Harry", whilst Angela Singer from Cambsnews.co.uk called Roberts "slick" and noted that his appearances on stage "never fail to get a response". Roberts has said that he likes doing pantomimes as it brings people together and his belief that there is "something for everyone" in the productions.

== Acting credits ==
=== Filmography ===
Year	Title	Role	Notes	Ref.
2011–14	Hollyoaks	George Smith	Regular role	

=== Theatre ===
Year	Production	Role	Venue(s)	Ref.
2015	The History Boys	Posner	Various (UK tour)	
2018	The Secret Garden	Colin Craven	York Theatre Royal	
2018–19	Aladdin	Aladdin	Theatre Royal, Norwich	
2023–24	Mother Goose	Silly Sammy Goose	Cambridge Arts Theatre	
2024–25	Cinderella	Tess (Wicked Stepsister)	Cambridge Arts Theatre	
2025–26	Sleeping Beauty	Happy Harry	Cambridge Arts Theatre	

== Awards and nominations ==
List of acting awards and nominations
Year	Award	Category	Title	Result	Ref.
2012	The British Soap Awards	Best Actor	Hollyoaks	Longlisted	
2012	Inside Soap Awards	Best Newcomer	Hollyoaks	Shortlisted	
2012	TV Choice Awards	Best Actor	Hollyoaks	Nominated	
2012	TV Choice Awards	Best Newcomer	Hollyoaks	Nominated	
2025	The Pantomime Awards	Best Sisters	Cinderella	Won	
