= Robbie Roscoe =

Fictional character from Hollyoaks

- Hollyoaks character
- Portrayed by: Charlie Wernham
- Duration: 2013–2016, 2024–2025
- First appearance: 2 April 2013
- Last appearance: 6 August 2025
- Introduced by: Bryan Kirkwood (2013); Hannah Cheers and Angelo Abela (2024)
In-universe information
- Occupation: Student (until 2014); Barman (2014); Club Owner
- Father: Rick Spencer
- Mother: Sandy Roscoe
- Stepfather: Fraser Black
- Brothers: Jason Roscoe
- Half-brothers: Darren Osborne; Joe Roscoe; Freddie Roscoe; Ziggy Roscoe
- Aunts: Auntie Christine; Margie; Jean
- Nephews: JJ Osborne; Oscar Osborne; Gabriel McQueen; JJ Roscoe; Charlie Dean (adoptive)
- Nieces: Frankie Osborne; Lexi Roscoe

Robbie Roscoe is a fictional character from the British Channel 4 soap opera Hollyoaks, played by Charlie Wernham. He made his first screen appearance on 2 April 2013. Robbie is part of the Roscoe family and the first member to be introduced. On 19 March 2013, a Channel 4 press release revealed that Robbie "leads the way for a family of boys to descend on Hollyoaks, headed by Gillian Taylforth as mother, Sandy." Wernham's casting was confirmed on 27 March 2013. Wernham auditioned for the show the previous year, attending his second audition on 24 October 2012. Daniel Kilkelly from Digital Spy later revealed Robbie is a "troublesome new student" and he would befriend established character Callum Kane (Laurie Duncan). The writer added that Robbie's headteacher Patrick Blake (Jeremy Sheffield) thinks he can control his behaviour. But Robbie soon begins to cause trouble. It was revealed in a flashback segment that Robbie had been killed by Jeremy Blake (Jeremy Sheffield), his final scenes aired on 6 August 2025.

Robbie's notable storylines have included working for Trevor Royle (Greg Wood); discovering Darren Osborne (Ashley Taylor Dawson) is his half-brother; bullying his teacher, John Paul McQueen (James Sutton), with Finn O'Connor (Keith Rice); his relationship with John Paul's niece Phoebe McQueen (Mandip Gill); being reunited with his father Rick Spencer (Victor Gardener); pushing his twin brother Jason Roscoe (Alfie Browne-Sykes) off a cliff; working with Ben Bradley (Ben Richards) to bring down Trevor; and his affairs with his brother Freddie Roscoe's (Charlie Clapham) wife and Finn's sister Sinead O'Connor (Stephanie Davis) and Jason's wife Holly Cunningham (Amanda Clapham), and his infatuation with sister-in-law and teacher Nancy Osborne (Jessica Fox).

It was announced on 25 March 2016 that Robbie and Jason would be departing from the programme and the twins left the serial on 28 March 2016. Wernham reprised his role as Robbie in 2024, with Robbie's return airing on 21 May 2024. On 3 July 2024, it was announced that Wernham would once again leave the programme, with Robbie's exit airing the following week on 8 July 2024. On 5 September 2024, Robbie made a surprise return.

== Development ==
Robbie was created to pave the way for the rest of the Roscoe family to be introduced. Robbie was introduced as a sixth form student who was going to be trouble. Wernham auditioned for the show the previous year, attending his second audition on 24 October 2012. Daniel Kilkelly from Digital Spy later revealed Robbie is a "troublesome new student" and he would befriend established character Callum Kane (Laurie Duncan). The writer added that Robbie's headteacher Patrick Blake (Jeremy Sheffield) thinks he can control his behaviour, but Robbie soon begins to cause trouble.

It was announced that Robbie would have a crush on teacher Nancy Hayton (Jessica Fox), which begins when she is helping him prepare for his exams. Jessica Fox who plays Nancy said that she didn't like how Nancy was getting on.

Wernham briefly departed Hollyoaks to film The Bad Education Movie. Hollyoaks wrote Robbie out by sending him to prison for the assault on Dirk Savage.

During the Hollyoaks Summer 2015 trailer, it was shown that Robbie and Holly would hook up. Wernham stated in an interview that Holly would be torn between Robbie and Jason. So far Ben Bradley is the only one who knows about this affair between them and he is using Robbie to get information on Trevor in exchange he won't tell Jason about the affair. When discussing Holly and Robbie's affair, Wernham explains to Digital Spy "Robbie and Holly sleeping together comes out of nowhere and it shocks both of them. I think it sparks something in Robbie and he realises that he has feelings for her, which is not good when Holly is going out with his brother! That will be an ongoing thing. I didn't know it was going to happen until I read the scripts. At first I thought it was going to be a one-off thing and they'd be trying to hide it from Jason, but it's not - Robbie starts to develop feelings for her." In an interview Wernham admitted that he would be surprised if his on-screen brother would let Robbie's affair with Holly go. When Robbie's departure was announced Wernham stated "This time, I felt that it was the right time for me to do other things - given my age, the amount of time I'd been in the show and where my character was at." in an interview.

== Storylines ==
Robbie arrives for his first day at college where the headteacher Patrick Blake (Jeremy Sheffield) warns him not to cause trouble. He is mentored by Callum Kane (Laurie Duncan) but decides to truant college. Robbie begins to terrorise Doug Carter (PJ Brennan) and vandalise his delicatessen business. Doug reports Robbie to Patrick, much to his annoyance. Robbie and Callum notice Doug kissing John Paul McQueen (James Sutton) as they deface Patrick's car. Robbie puts pictures of the incident around college and John Paul loses his job. Robbie asks Callum to help him sell drugs and he agrees. Robbie helps Ste Hay (Kieron Richardson) deliver drug orders to buyers. Robbie steals a van with Callum and Sinead O'Connor (Stephanie Davis) and runs over Sinead's brother Finn O'Connor (Keith Rice). Rather than help him, they drive off and Robbie threatens Sinead to convince Finn to lie to the police. Robbie plans an armed robbery at Price Slice and enlists the help of Finn and Callum, but Callum changes his mind and attempts to prevent the robbery but he is shot in the struggle. When Robbie's mother Sandy (Gillian Taylforth) learns of the robbery, she sends him to stay with his aunt.

Robbie and Finn begin terrorising John Paul. They begin by teasing him about his sexuality and the situation ends when Finn rapes John Paul after hitting him over the head with a statue. Weeks later, when Finn is in hospital after a quad bike accident, Robbie continues teasing John Paul, locking him in a store cupboard and then teasing him over his sexuality again. This concludes when John Paul hits Robbie. When visiting Finn in hospital, Robbie finds out that he raped John Paul and is horrified, threatening to call the police. Since his discovery, Robbie begins to change and starts to stick up for John Paul, changing his statement when John Paul is up in court for hitting him. However, Finn changes it back and John Paul goes down. Robbie ditches his bad boy attitude and begins working towards his A-levels with the help of cover teacher Nancy Osborne (Jessica Fox). He begins dating Phoebe McQueen (Mandip Gill). However, he begins to develop feelings for Nancy as she starts to help him with his A-level work more and kisses her. Phoebe finds texts on his phone apologising to Nancy and later sees them getting close. She decides to tell Nancy's boyfriend and ex-husband Darren (Ashley Taylor Dawson), who is Robbie's half-brother. However, they later reconcile.

Bad news for Robbie as he discover that his father Rick Spencer (Victor Gardener) arrived on town to see him and Jason, but more tragedy strikes as Jason was suffered body dysmorphic disorder, and their father is knocked unconscious by Joe and later dies in hospital after being given an overdose of morphine by an unknown killer. Robbie and Jason are led to believe Joe's punch killed Rick and Jason forgives Joe, though Robbie resents him and begins to act recklessly by stealing cars and assaulting Dirk Savage after he belittled him in the street because Robbie was anonymously blackmailing Dirk Savage (David Kennedy). Robbie eventually owns up to his mistake and turns himself in to the police.

A day before being released John-Paul visits him to tell him that Phoebe has been shot. The next day, Robbie is released and goes straight to hospital and barricades himself in Phoebe's hospital room, terrified she will die during her brain surgery. Joe and Freddie talk him out and Phoebe has a successful operation. Phoebe then tells him it was Grace who shot her, and Robbie tries to get revenge on Grace. Before he can do any harm, Joe tells him that it was him who shot Phoebe. Robbie then disowns Joe and proposes to Phoebe, which she agrees. When Robbie went to buy an engagement ring, Phoebe is murdered by the Gloved Hand Killer. Believing Joe to be the reason she died, Robbie attacks him with a crowbar, causing him to lose the use of his legs. Joe then lies to the police for Robbie. Nancy comforts Robbie after Phoebe's death eventually leading to them having sex after Phoebe's funeral.

Robbie then returns to work for Trevor and when he finds out that he's planning to kill Kim Butterfield (Daisy Wood-Davis). He asks Trevor to let him send her out of the country instead. Trevor however puts drugs in Kim's bags and when Jason pull them over Robbie runs off with the bag to let Kim escape. Robbie and Jason argue, with Robbie revealing he told Jason's fiancée Holly Cunningham (Amanda Clapham) that her mother, Cindy (Stephanie Waring), kissed him. The fight turns physical ending with Robbie pushing Jason off a cliff. Robbie flees the scene and later has sex with Holly. Ben Bradley (Ben Richards) arrests Robbie but gives him a choice: inform him on Trevor or he'll make sure that Robbie will go back to prison and that Jason will know that he slept with Holly. Robbie agrees to work for him and informs him that Trevor and Ashley Davidson (Kierston Wareing) are planning to kidnap Patrick. Trevor and Ashley realise that somebody told the police and kidnap Holly, suspecting it was her. Robbie then texts Jason and he manages to convince Trevor and Ashley to let Holly go. Robbie then tells Ben he cannot work for him anymore and goes to tell Holly that he loves her, but found out that Jason bet him to it and they are back together, however Robbie and Holly pursue an affair behind Jason's back.

Months later, Jason finds out about Robbie and Holly on his and Holly's wedding day after Nico Blake (Persephone Swales-Dawson) sends a video of Robbie confessing his love to Holly, from Dr. Charles S'avage's (Andrew Greenough) laptop, to Jason out of jealousy. Jason ends up taking steroids again and tries to force himself on to Holly. After convincing from Freddie, Holly lies to Robbie and tells him that she slept with Jason again, ending things between them. In March 2016, Robbie and Jason decide leave to live in South Africa with Sandy, choosing life with each other over life with Holly.

== Reception ==
When describing Robbie in an interview, Channel Four made a comment that Charlie wasn't a toe rag like Robbie. The affair between Holly and Robbie has been described as "scandalous".
