= Finn O'Connor =

Fictional character from Hollyoaks

- Hollyoaks character
- Keith Rice as Finn O'Connor
- Portrayed by: Connor Wilkinson (2010–2011); Keith Rice (2013–2019)
- Duration: 2010–2011, 2013–2015, 2017, 2019
- First appearance: 1 September 2010
- Last appearance: 10 December 2019
- Introduced by: Paul Marquess (2010); Bryan Kirkwood (2013, 2015, 2017, 2019)
In-universe information
- Occupation: Student; Christmas tree deliverer
- Father: Rob O'Connor
- Mother: Morag Fairhurst
- Adoptive mother: Diane O'Connor
- Sisters: Sinead O'Connor
- Half-brothers: Anthony Hutchinson (adoptive)
- Half-sisters: Olivia O'Connor; Dee Dee Hutchinson (adoptive); Rose Lomax (adoptive); Eva Hutchinson (adoptive)
- Daughters: Bella Sharpe
- Nieces: Katy O'Connor; Hannah Hay-O'Connor
- First cousins: Scott Drinkwell (adoptive)

Finn O'Connor is a fictional character from the British Channel 4 soap opera Hollyoaks. Upon his introduction as part of the O'Connor family, the character was portrayed by Connor Wilkinson. The family were introduced during a "shake-up" of the show by new series producer Paul Marquess. Writers then placed Finn in an issue-led story exploring underage sex and teenage pregnancy with Amber Sharpe (Lydia Lloyd-Henry). The character was written out of the series in 2011.

The character's reintroduction was announced in March 2013, with the role recast to actor Keith Rice. Producers involved Finn in a male rape plot when he rapes schoolteacher John Paul McQueen (James Sutton). At the conclusion of the storyline in October 2014, Finn was written out of the series by being sent to prison. Rice reprised his role for guest stints on three occasions in 2015, 2017 and 2019. His 2019 return features Finn's release from prison.

== Development ==
=== Creation ===
In January 2010, Hollyoaks series producer Lucy Allan quit her role and was replaced by Paul Marquess, who immediately began a revamp of the series. Several characters were axed and new signings were revealed. The O'Connor family were the third new family to be announced, with former Brookside actress Alexandra Fletcher being cast as the stepmother of the Liverpudlian family. Marquess commented on the family: "We're very excited about the arrival of the O'Connors who burst onto screens in August with a very dramatic storyline. And I'm personally very excited to work with the fantastic Alex Fletcher again."

Stephanie Davis who portrays Finn's sister Sinead O'Connor described her character and Finn's relationship, saying: "Well, obviously it's a brother and sister relationship so she is sometimes quite moody with him! But she loves him loads, and you'll see in one of the first scenes that Amber Sharpe is being a bit nasty to him, so Sinead goes over to have it out with her! But then they end up really good friends. After that, when Sinead's at home, she's nice to him — but when she's with her friends, she's a bit horrible to him!"

=== Underage sex ===
After his arrival, it was announced that he and Amber Sharpe would be involved in an underage sex storyline. Hollyoaks, teaming up with Channel 4 Education's Battlefront, would explore sex involving two 12-year-olds, which would lead to Amber's pregnancy.

Lucy Willis, the executive producer for Battlefront explained, "Battlefront gives young people an opportunity to run campaigns about subjects they feel passionately about. Abbie Louise’s campaign Where Is The Love tackles an incredibly important issue which affects many young people today, who feel huge peer pressure to have sex before they are ready, often without the help and advice of adequate sex education at school."

Of the storyline, Marquess said: "Hollyoaks has long been credited for tackling difficult issues that affect young people in a sensitive and intelligent way. I am very proud that we are once again bringing to the forefront a subject for our young audience that many parents, politicians and schools struggle to address. The storyline very clearly communicates to the audience that Amber and Finn were not emotionally or physically ready to engage in any sexual activity. And make no mistake, there will be no fairytale ending for Amber; she is faced with the most difficult situation she could ever imagine. On 12 July 2011 Finn receives a text message of Amber with a photo attached of their baby girl, Bella. He shows Sinead the message and when she asks whether he wants to see the baby, Finn says no, and deletes the photo."

=== Departure (2011) ===
In August 2011, Emma Smithwick told Daniel Kilkelly from Digital Spy that Finn had left to live with his father. She explained that the storylines had not required "really demanded that he should be there". But she remained open to the possibility of a future return for the character.

=== Return ===
In March 2013 it was announced that Finn will return to the series after two years with recast by Keith Rice. In May 2019 it was announced that Finn will return to the series after having a guest role in 2015 & 2017 with Rice reprising the role. The actor signed up to reprise the role was filming his comeback scene. Speaking to Digital Spy, Rice was thrilled to work on the show again with the cast and crew, and to show how Finn, following his time in prison will integrate back into his family and also back into society. His returning scene will see his stepmother Diane reach out to him in prison and mention how she wants him to understand the mindset of rapist, after his sister Sinead is raped by her husband Laurie Shelby (Kyle Pryor).

Upon the announcement of his return, producer Kirkwood will show how Finn finishes his sentence and afterwards whether the villagers allow him back to community or whether he is truly sorry.

== Storylines ==
Finn first appears as a new student at Hollyoaks High. Finn tries to befriend another new student, Amber. However, this backfires when Amber refuses to be friends. The next day, Finn and his stepmother Diane have an argument, regarding the fact that she is desperate for a baby of her own. Finn argues that he and his sister Sinead are not enough for Diane, and that she will forget them if she does get pregnant. After Diane kidnaps a baby from a local hospital, Finn and Amber take the child, but are caught by Anita Roy (Saira Choudhry). Amber later confides in Finn, as the pair discuss their troubled home lives. They eventually discuss sex. Amber proposes she and Finn have sex, to which he agrees.

Amber asks Finn to buy her a pregnancy test, which later confirms her to be pregnant. Whilst they are in Amber's room discussing what to do about her pregnancy, a fire spreads from the restaurant below. Amber and Finn discover they are trapped and are forced to escape through the skylight. When Amber's family finds out about her pregnancy, she lies that Rob is the father of her baby; as a result, the Sharpes move away from Hollyoaks. Amber's allegations also lead to the truth emerging that Diane is a former pupil of Rob's, and her relationship with him began when she was still underage. Rob soon moves away, leaving Finn and Sinead with Diane. A few months later Finn receives news that Amber has given birth to a daughter named Bella but he decides not to go to see her. He makes the choice to leave Hollyoaks and go to live with Rob.

In April 2013, Rob shows up at Diane's house to tell her that Finn has gone missing. Sinead plans to go to a party with Robbie Roscoe (Charlie Wernham) and Callum Kane (Laurie Duncan), but on the way they run over Finn. They make a quick getaway but Sinead later finds out that it was Finn, and meets him at the hospital. Diane faints and later finds out she's pregnant. Robbie shows up to tell Finn about the pregnancy, and threatens him to keep quiet about the accident. Robbie also threatens Sinead. A few days later Finn is seen speaking to Robbie in College Coffee. They go back to Finn's house which is being sold by Rob. They trash the house so no one will want to buy it. Robbie later sneaks into the house and trashes it even more. The O'Connors then move in with Diane's partner Tony Hutchinson (Nick Pickard). Tony tries to bond with Finn by playing football but the plan backfires. Finn later agrees to rob Price Slice with Robbie and Callum, but when they find out Robbie is planning to use a gun, Callum backs out. Robbie and Finn go to Price Slice only to find out that Sinead is there. She does not recognise them as they are both wearing balaclavas. Darren Osborne (Ashley Taylor Dawson) and his son Oscar enter the shop. Robbie turns the gun on them. Callum then runs in to save them but is shot by Robbie. Finn flees the shop not knowing if Callum is dead or alive.

Beginning in late 2013, Finn and Robbie begin to terrorise John Paul McQueen (James Sutton), a teacher at Hollyoaks High School. It lasts for months and eventually Tony brings Finn to the McQueens' house to apologise just as Theresa McQueen (Jorgie Porter) leaves after realising the police are after her for the murder of Calvin Valentine (Ricky Whittle). Finn later attacks Nana McQueen (Diane Langton) and she is taken to hospital. Subsequently, at school, John Paul realises from an injury on Finn's hand that Finn is responsible for the attack on Nana. Robbie warns Finn to make sure that John Paul doesn't tell anyone. Finn and Robbie begin plotting to rob the school but Finn is caught by John Paul, who was working late. Finn and John Paul argue, and John Paul tries to report Finn to the police. Finn hits John Paul over the head with an ornament and subsequently rapes him. John Paul goes straight to the police, however he is too ashamed to name Finn as his attacker. Finn returns to the school, disposing of the ornament and the clothes he was wearing.

Finn continues to terrorize John Paul. While on a class trip, Finn and Robbie compete with each other for the attention of Phoebe McQueen (Mandip Gill). This results in Finn and Robbie stealing quad bikes and racing into the forest, where Finn loses control of the bike and crashes. John Paul finds him and briefly considers leaving him without helping, which Robbie witnesses. After Finn is taken to hospital, Robbie continues to berate John Paul for leaving Finn to die, which leads to John Paul attacking Robbie in class. With both in hospital, Robbie asks Finn why John Paul would react as he did. He casually states that it was not like Finn raped John Paul, however when he sees Finn's reaction, he realizes the truth. Shocked, Robbie goes to John Paul and tells him he will try to help him, going so far as to re-write his statement, telling the truth and giving it to Sam. However Finn realizes what Robbie is planning and switches the statement, resulting in John Paul being sent to prison.

Finn's behaviour continues to worsen. After getting drunk with Blessing Chambers, he discovers she is transgender. This leads to him badly beating her and leaving her in hospital. Finn goes to the hospital to visit her, pretending to apologise, however once they are alone he continues to mock her but is overheard by Tony. Meanwhile, Sinead, who is out to destroy her family, breaks into Finn's laptop, discovering he has been viewing very graphic pornography. She shows Diane, however he manages to explain it away.

In August, Amber and Bella return to the village, with Amber claiming she has left her boyfriend. Finn immediately jumps into the role of father, while Diane is suspicious about Amber's true motives. When she listens to Amber's voicemail she discovers Amber only returned to get money off Finn. Diane bribes her to leave. Finn sees her getting into a taxi and tries to stop her but he is stopped by Nancy Osborne (Jessica Fox), causing Finn to lose control after Nancy compares his outburst to a toddler's. Later, after learning Diane had paid Amber to leave, Finn storms in the Dog and attempts to buy a beer, however Nancy refuses. An enraged Finn later attacks Nancy and attempts to rape her but is interrupted when Phoebe arrives. Nancy initially accuses Robbie, whom she also had an argument with moments before the attack. Having learned from Phoebe about the attempted rape, Robbie had gone to Finn's house only to be arrested there. Thinking he had again gotten away with his crime, Finn attends Nancy and Darren's wedding, but leaves during the service when a suspicious Phoebe texts him from Robbie's phone. He arranges to meet her but before he can, Diane finds him and come into the reception. On the way, John Paul quietly asks him if he attacked Nancy. Finn casually denies it and once again mocks John Paul that Nancy was man enough to report her attack. However, moments later while congratulating Nancy, she suddenly realizes that the aftershave Finn is wearing is the same as the one her attacker wore. Nancy immediately accuses Finn, to which Diane defends him. A visibly shaken John Paul is finally able to say that he to was attacked by Finn and he is arrested. With the combined testimony of Nancy, John Paul and Robbie, and Finn's own aggressive response to being questioned, he is charged with rape and attempted rape. He is subsequently denied bail and remanded to await trial. A forensic swab taken from John Paul after the rape proves to include Finn's DNA.

Diane has continued to maintain that Finn is innocent, but the DNA result and insistence from Tony (who was Finn's appropriate adult for questioning) cause her to have doubts. She visits Finn in prison and demands that he tell her the truth. Finn lies that John Paul had been grooming him for weeks on end and used drugs and alcohol to coerce Finn into sex. Subsequently, Finn pleads Not Guilty to the charges of rape and attempted rape, and the case goes to trial. In court he maintains the story that John Paul abused him; with the defence attempting to portray John Paul as a sexual predator and Nancy as a liar. After a conversation with Nana McQueen (Diane Langton), Diane retracts the false alibi she had given Finn for the night of Nancy's attack. She confesses that he was not at home with her at the time and that she does not believe his story of having been sexually coerced by John Paul. Finn is convicted of both charges and returned to prison to await sentencing. He screams from the dock that he hates Diane and will never forgive her for what she has done; later, Diane finds that he has refused her request to visit him in prison. However, Finn permits a visit from John Paul, who says that he can now move on with his life and Finn will never control him again before leaving. Later Finn attempts to contact by calling him many times and sending him a visitors permit in the post. John Paul asks Trevor if he will "sort him out" but Trevor won't do it because he doesn't think John Paul can handle the guilt. When John Paul goes through Sinead's purse to get a sonogram photo, he finds several visitor passes. When John Paul visits Finn in prison, Finn shows a lot of remorse for what he did, and begs John Paul to forgive him, which he doesn't.

In September 2015, Sinead went to visit him for a while to meet her daughter Hannah for the first time, before leaving Hollyoaks forever after she discovers that Ste was having an affair with Harry. Finn is sentenced to four years in prison and is denied the chance to apply for early release after breaching prison rules.

In February 2017, when Diane returns to Hollyoaks, she begins acting secretive, which is discovered by Diane's niece Lily Drinkwell (Lauren McQueen). Lily assumes that Diane is having an affair, but it is revealed that Diane has been talking to Finn, when she visits him in prison. At some point, he attacks John Paul's boyfriend, James Nightingale, who is representing Finn in his legal case to ensure that he does not get out.

Two years later, Diane visits Finn in prison and asks him questions about his actions, hoping to understand the mind of a rapist after Sinead is raped by her husband, Laurie Shelby (Kyle Pryor). Months later, Finn and Laurie are placed in the same prison van during transportation to the prison. Finn converses with Laurie and eventually realises who he is, causing Finn to attack him.

The prison guard becomes distracted by the fight and crashes the van, which overturns and allows Laurie to escape. As Finn's sentence comes to an end, Diane tells him that he can come home and stays with her but she does not tell Sinead. Finn is released a couple of days early and arrives in the village and at Diane's house. Finn goes in to the village to buy flowers for Sinead and is seen by people.

Nana McQueen explains to people who he is and tells him to stay away, Sally St. Claire tells him John Paul is her child. Sinead, however, doesn't want him around, due to her memories of Laurie. Finn tries to tell people he has changed. When Tony's father, Edward Hutchinson, arrives to the village, Finn became suspicious of him. Finn befriends Yasmine Maalik (Haiesha Mistry), who is deaf.

Finn learns that Yasmine is planning Sinead's wedding to Yasmine's brother Sami Maalik (Rishi Nair) and was not happy of Sinead's decision of not inviting him to the wedding. Finn touches Yasmine's arm, and she freaks out. Finn apologises to Yasmine, who forgives him and agrees to be his friend.

When Sami learns about Finn and Yasmine's friendship from Edward, he tells Finn to stay away from Yasmine, after seeing them embrace. Sami later invites Finn to be Yasmine's plus one at the wedding. But at the wedding, Finn learns from Sami that Sinead isn't coming to the wedding and the wedding is off. Finn blames himself for Sinead's disappearance, but Diane assures him that none of it is his fault. Yasmine helps Finn find a job and had him work on delivering Christmas trees and he attends Hollyoaks High School to deliver.

Juliet Quinn (Niamh Blackshaw) grabs Finn's cap running and she throws it inside the classroom. Finn runs to retrieve it and he went into the classroom, where he raped John Paul, and he has flashbacks of that night. When Nancy arrives and sees Finn, she calls Sally. Sally confronts him about raping John Paul and banishes him from the school, in front of Finn's boss, who fires him. He is upset and tells Diane that he just got fired from the job. Finn learns from Yasmine that Edward formed an alliance with Sally to rid of him, but Finn refuses to believe her and tells her to stay out of it. Edward convinces Finn to make an apology speech to the people at Marnie Nightingale's patisserie grand-opening, which he did, but James calls him a 'pervert' and Finn runs off with embarrassment. Yasmine runs after him and Finn plans on leaving, but Yasmine tells him not to, as she has feelings for him and they share a kiss. Finn tells Yasmine that he likes her too, but it would be hard for him if they start a relationship. Yasmine tells Finn that she's been digging and researching about Edward and showed Finn an old article about Edward getting arrested for accusations of killing his wife. Finn shows the old article about Edward to Diane, who tells him to back off. Finn is horrified when he comes face-to-face with John Paul, who returns to the village. Agreed with John Paul, Edward, Nancy and Sally, Finn decides to leave the village to be with Amber and their daughter Bella, without saying goodbye to Yasmine.

== Reception ==
A poll ran on the E4 website asked viewers which member of the O'Connor family was their favourite. Finn received the fewest votes, with only 837 (19.03%) people voting for him.
