= George Smith (Hollyoaks) =

UK soap opera character, created 2011

- Hollyoaks character
- Portrayed by: Steven Roberts
- Duration: 2011–2014
- First appearance: 5 September 2011
- Last appearance: 18 September 2014
- Introduced by: Gareth Philips
In-universe information
- Occupation: Student; Shop assistant (2011–2012); Mechanic (2014); Secretary (2014); Coffee shop assistant (2014)
- Father: Geoff Palmer
- Mother: Annette Palmer

George Smith (also Andrew Palmer) is a fictional character from the British Channel 4 soap opera Hollyoaks, played by Steven Roberts. George debuted on-screen on 5 September 2011. George was introduced alongside the characters Neil Cooper (Tosin Cole) and Callum Kane (Laurie Duncan); forming a new group of sixth-form college students. George is homosexual and is characterised as a "sharp tongued fashionista" with an unusual dress sense. He is best friends with Maddie Morrison (Scarlett Bowman) and Tilly Evans (Lucy Dixon), Roberts has said that George acts like their "lap-dog". However, George lacks confidence around the series' male characters.

George was brought to the forefront of the series when he features in a homelessness storyline. Hollyoaks worked with the charities Centrepoint and Shelter to conduct research into the issue. Roberts said the storyline raised awareness of a taboo subject in the media. The storyline portrayed George dealing with various aspects of homelessness and offered viewers an insight to the character. He has an "unlikely" friendship with Callum and his dynamic with Phoebe Jackson (Mandip Gill) reveals that George puts up an act around others to fit in. Anthony D. Langford of AfterElton.com has praised the storyline for highlighting the issue of homeless gay teenagers, while a columnist for Soaplife has embraced George's openness about his sexuality.

Roberts left his role in 2014 and George made a surprise exit in the E4 episode on 17 September 2014.

== Development ==
=== Creation and characterisation ===
The character was introduced as one of six new sixth-form students who arrive to study in Hollyoaks. The character was announced on 25 August 2011 with actor Steven Roberts taking the role. George was introduced alongside two other new characters Neil Cooper (Tosin Cole) and Callum Kane (Laurie Duncan). Completing the set of new students were the three previously seen characters of Maddie Morrison (Scarlett Bowman), Tilly Evans (Lucy Dixon) and Jono (Dylan Llewellyn). Roberts made his first on-screen appearance as George in the episode broadcast on 5 September 2011.

OMG! If you're ever in need of fashion advice or a shopping companion, then look no further than George! Determined to bring style to the corridors of Hollyoaks 6th Form, this sharp tongued fashionista will tell you what not to wear - whether you want to know or not. Best mates with Maddie and Tilly, George likes nothing more than hanging out with his girls, but when it comes to romance he lacks the confidence to make a move on boys - not that this stops him crushing on lots of them! .

— E4.com on George.

George was described by in a press release as being the best friend and "fashionista" to Maddie and Tilly. George gives out fashion advice to his friends even if they do not like it. George does not have any confidence around men and despite his many "crushes" he is too afraid to act on them. Roberts told AGENT2 magazine that George is the "gay best friend" and a "good friend" who follows the girls around like "their lap dog". George "tells them what they want to hear and dresses them." George knows a great deal about fashion, but Roberts said did not know as much and had to take a more "active interest" in fashion trends. He branded George's own attire as "very out there" because his outfits are "very colourful and cool". Roberts did not like many of his outfits because they were too colourful. He later told Daniel Kilkelly of Digital Spy that he did not mind the clothing because it is part of George's character. Roberts said that the fact George enjoys his clothes was a good quality. Will Martin of Cultbox said that George is "outspoken and catty"; which makes males "wary of his oozing self-confidence".

=== Squatting and homelessness ===
"Imagine living in a dirty, damp, cold squat. Too embarrassed to tell any of your friends. No heating, no running water, no food or bed. Poor George is in a real rut. He's terrified his friends will find out his homeless secret and he's struggling to afford to eat. Those living conditions and his poor diet are a recipe for ill health."

— E4.com on George's situation. (2012)

George was brought to the forefront of the series when he was featured in a storyline focusing on homelessness. Roberts told Digital Spy's Daniel Kilkelly that the serial's producer Emma Smithwick talked him through their plans for the storyline. He was "really excited" at the prospect of portraying "hard-hitting" issue lead story. Hollyoaks worked with the charities Centrepoint and Shelter to conduct research for the storyline. They aimed to raise awareness of homeless teenagers. Roberts was not very aware of the issue to begin with. He said that it was nice of the series to highlight a real issue that "you don't really see it in the papers".

In December 2011, Smithwick told Digital Spy that she "loved" George and was excited about a storyline that the production team had planned for him. Later that month Daniel Kilkelly of Digital Spy revealed that George was hiding a "huge secret" and questioned how long George could keep it hidden from his friends. In January 2012, Smithwick told Inside Soap that she was finding George an interesting character and still "loved" to watch him. The storyline then began to play out on-screen and viewers discovered that George had no fixed address and had been squatting in a house. Press spoilers released on 8 January 2012 revealed that George's storyline would come to front of storylines over the weeks that followed. Mandip Gill was cast as Phoebe Jackson; a fellow squatter who lives with George. While fellow sixth-form student Callum discovers George's secret and tries to help him.

Gill told TV Times that her Phoebe had been squatting for longer than George and he is not as "streetwise" as she is. As Callum is George's friend she does not trust him because she views outsiders as "trouble". Phoebe fears that she will lose George and both end up in care if Callum reports them. Gill said that "George and her dog Thunder are all she has". This causes tension between Phoebe and George and he decides to move out. Phoebe feels "guilty" because George is unwell. Gill said that George's illness forces Phoebe to put her own feeling aside to ask Callum for help. Gill said that "George is very ill and she knows it'd be on her conscience if anything happened to him." Roberts' take on the friendship George and Phoebe share, echoed Gill's previous statement. He felt that George is inexperienced in being homeless compared to her; having only been homeless for eight months. In his backstory; George became dependent on Phoebe as his situation became desperate, while in the storyline she is his source for advice on "what to do and where to go". However, their friendship leads them into "quite awkward situations" where they act as one another's "lifelines". When George is around Phoebe he is serious and "down-to-earth", which forges a "brilliant" friendship. Roberts indicated that this was in stark contrast to his behaviour around his sixth-form friends. George creates a bravado to fit in with them and he pretends all is fine, "while being quite camp and outrageous".

In one scene Callum asks George whether his parents disowned him because he is homosexual. George did not confirm the details of their estrangement. Roberts told Kilkelly that at that point, George does not feel he needs to discuss his family life because he has moved on. Roberts said that the storyline helped convey an insight to why George acts the way he does. As the storyline developed, more details surrounding George are revealed and audience was given the chance to see how George deals with the various situations of homelessness. The storyline became "a lot darker" as it became more serious. As the storyline progressed; George and Phoebe are forced to live on the streets after other squatters steal their living space. Roberts said that the squat provided George with a platform to attend college and put up a front. Now he sleeps on cardboard in the streets. Roberts said that George starts to look "rougher because it's cold, damp and very bleak". They receive help from Deena Hardman (Sian Breckin). Roberts described her as "very manipulative character and she hasn't got their best interests at heart".

== Storylines ==
George arrives at Hollyoaks Sixth Form College with his friends Maddie, Tilly, Jono and Neil. George reveals he has crushes on many of the local males and offers advice to his friends. Maddie and Tilly convince George to go on a night out with Bart McQueen (Jonny Clarke), Jono and Neil while they have a girl's night. George finds it hard to bond with the guys until he manages to steal a beer pump for the local pub. He tells Maddie that she should get together with Callum. Maddie accuses George of gossiping and lying, and then refuses to include him. Tilly comforts George while he cries in the toilets. George gets a job at the Price Slice shop.

George then begins stealing scraps of food from people when they are not looking. He continues to act secretive and goes to a house where he is squatting. While Maddie is away on holiday, George is paired with Callum in an assignment for General Studies. In the SU Bar, Callum convinces George to buy the drinks to improve his confidence. A group of revellers push George around because he is gay. Callum defends George by fighting the group off. After George refuses to let Callum take him home; he lets George stay at his house. Callum becomes suspicious of George's home life and follows him back to his squat. Callum tries to help George by providing him with food. Phoebe tells Callum not to trust him. Callum spends the night in the squat to find out what George lives like. George falls ill and refuses help from Callum. George chases shoplifters who attack him, he tells Callum he needs the job to survive. When he goes to stay at Callum's again, Maddie nearly catches him. George finds that his squat has been taken over and is scared away. He and Phoebe are forced to live on the streets and beg. Maddie quips George over his messy appearance, which results in him losing his temper with her. He again refuses help from Callum and accepts money from Deena Hardman (Sian Breckin). Phoebe is then attacked by a thug.

Phoebe is attacked by a thug and is saved by Deena who takes Phoebe and George back to her home. Phoebe thinks that Deena has an ulterior motive, while George thinks she is being friendly. Phoebe finds a photograph of a missing boy she knows and realises that Deena is involved in human trafficking. Deena and Graham Hardman (Steve Marsh) become violent in their attempts to stop George and Phoebe escaping. George escapes and tells Callum that he thinks Phoebe did not. George later finds Phoebe's bracelet and assumes she is safe. He then agrees to stay at Callum's for a while. George struggles to get along with Lacey Kane (Georgia Bourke). Phoebe returns and tells George that Deena and Graham are watching him. Phoebe leads George to Deena, who takes him back to her house and locks him up. Phoebe tells him that she betrayed him to save her dog's life. Deena arranges for George to have sex with a man, who turns out to be an under cover police officer. Phoebe and George decide to run away from the police to avoid being sent into care. Maddie and Callum take George to see his parents. George reveals that he was bullied which eventually led to him leaving home. After he threw his old identity off a cliff, George realises that his family presumed that he killed himself. George reveals that his name is actually Andrew Palmer and returns to his parents who are shocked that he is alive. George plans to go to Jono and Ruby Button's (Anna Shaffer) wedding. Maddie steals a mini van and plans to drive them so they can elope to Gretna Green. They discover the van they have stolen has the wedding cakes from Tony Hutchinson (Nick Pickard), Cindy Cunningham (Stephanie Waring), Ste Hay (Kieron Richardson) and Doug Carter's (PJ Brennan) double wedding. George feels ill and the sight of the cake makes him feel worse so he switches seats with Neil. On their way to drop the wedding cakes off, Bart and Esther try to drive them off the road so they can stop the wedding. Maddie realises the brakes are not working and has to swerve off the road to avoid Leah Barnes (Ela-May Demircan). Maddie crashes in to the wedding venue of the double wedding and the car is upturned. Neil is killed. Maddie helps George escape and he helps her free herself. George thanks Maddie for saving his life and then realises that if he had not switches seats with Neil, Neil would not have died. The van explodes and the flaming mini bus door falls out of the sky hitting Maddie and killing her instantly.

== Reception ==
For his portrayal of George, Roberts was nominated for "Best Actor" at the 2012 British Soap Awards. He was later nominated in the categories of "Best Actor" and "Best Newcomer" at the 2012 TV Choice Awards. At the 2012 Inside Soap Awards Roberts was nominated for "Best Newcomer".

Anthony D. Langford of AfterElton.com admitted that he did not see George's homeless storyline coming. He said that it would be "interesting to see where this reality-based storyline is headed" because "there are a lot of homeless gay teens". Langford later said that he was intrigued by where the serial were taking the storyline. He opined that a relationship between George and Callum would be credible given the serial's history concerning homosexual characters. He described their scenes as "very sweet"; and opined that a love triangle between George, Callum and Maddie would make a "great story". Langford said it was a "good decision by the writers" to pair the two characters in a "topical storyline". He stated his surprise to his enjoyment of the storyline because initially "couldn’t stand" the character of George. Langford later criticised what he thought was the climax of the human trafficking storyline. He bemoaned the dearth of realism when George assumed Phoebe was safe because he found her bracelet. Langford also felt that Hollyoaks wanted the storyline to end quickly and branded it as a ploy to get George and Callum living together.

A columnist for Soaplife defended George after he was involved in a homophobic attack in the SU Bar. They said that "George has made no secret of the fact he's gay to his mates, and why should he? They rightly don't care if he's gay, straight or bi." They added that they were wrong to do so and branded Callum protecting George as "cute and courageous". When George is forced to live on the streets, a columnist for TV Buzz said that he was "lucky" to have Phoebe; especially after a tramp attacks them. They added that they were happy that Deena saves George, but questioned her motives for helping him. Sarah Ellis from Inside Soap said "George's story proved that sexual exploitation can affect anyone"; she was also "relieved" that George managed to escape before anything "truly terrible" happened to him. Ellis later called George a "flamboyant student" who went through "various traumas" during his stint on the soap. In 2015, Pete Wise from YorkMix Radio called George a "sharp-tongued fashionista". John Bultitude from Eastern Daily Press called George a "sensitive soul" who "certainly went through it" during his stint on the soap; he also added that George had "fashionista design-sense and slightly gauche personality".
