= Maddie Morrison =

UK soap opera character (created 2011)

- Hollyoaks character
- Portrayed by: Scarlett Bowman
- Duration: 2011–2012
- First appearance: 21 June 2011
- Last appearance: 15 November 2012
- Introduced by: Gareth Philips
- Spin-off appearances: A Little Film About Love by Jason Costello (2011)
In-universe information
- Occupation: Student (2011–2012)
- Father: Ed Morrison
- Mother: Elizabeth Morrison

Maddison "Maddie" Morrison is a fictional character from the British Channel 4 soap opera Hollyoaks, played by Scarlett Bowman. Maddie is an old friend of Bart McQueen (Jonny Clarke). Bowman's casting was announced in June 2011. Maddie was introduced to Hollyoaks along with her friends, Tilly Evans (Lucy Dixon) and Jono (Dylan Llewellyn). Maddie made her first appearance in the episode broadcast on 21 June 2011 and departed on 15 November 2012 when the character was killed in the highly publicised Enjoy The Ride storyline.

Maddie has been described as having a "seductive mixture of beauty, manipulation and wit". She studies at Hollyoaks Sixth Form College and is determined to be the college's Queen bee. Bowman opined that Maddie is not a bitch and although she appears arrogant, she is actually "a bit shy and insecure". The actress said that she is similar to Maddie and loves playing her. Maddie is best friends with Tilly and George Smith (Steven Roberts), and Bowman loves the dynamic between them. Maddie is relaxed when she is with Tilly and George, and her "strong points" come out.

Maddie's storylines have focused on her relationships. She is the ex-girlfriend of Bart and develops a rivalry with his girlfriend, Sinead O'Connor (Stephanie Davis). When Bart and Sinead end their relationship, Maddie attempts to keep them apart. Maddie later begins an "unlikely" relationship with Callum Kane (Laurie Duncan).

== Casting and character creation ==
The character of Maddie and Bowman's casting in the role were announced on 13 June 2011, along with Maddie's friends, Tilly and Jono (Dylan Llewellyn). Maddie, Tilly and Jono are the old school friends of Bart McQueen (Jonny Clarke). Digital Spy reported that the three new characters would be introduced in a "special" storyline shot on-location in Abersoch, Wales. Bowman made her first on-screen appearance as Maddie in the episode broadcast on 21 June 2011. In August 2011, it was revealed that Maddie, Tilly and Jono would form part of a new group of Sixth form students, along with George Smith (Steven Roberts), Neil Cooper (Tosin Cole) and Callum Kane (Laurie Duncan). Bowman exited the serial in November 2012 and her exit was not announced prior to it airing. Bowman said although the stunt that played out during her exit was used to cull cast members that "some people want to leave and move on to new ventures so it's not all just people getting culled and not wanting to go".

== Development ==
=== Characterisation ===
Joining Hollyoaks Sixth Form [...] Maddie immediately established herself as Queen bee - and no one is going to steal her crown! Ruling with a mixture of beauty, manipulation and wit, Maddie knows the power of gossip and skillfully uses it to get what she wants - and woe betide anyone who gets in her way. [...] It isn't all about vitriol with Maddie, though. One of the few people to see her softer side is one Callum Kane [...] Maddie's focus on being the ultimate Queen Bee led her to become a downright bully.

— E4.com on Maddie.

In an interview with OK! Bowman described Maddie, saying "I think at home she’s never had her place to delegate or prove her point. At school, that’s where her true colours come out, because she wants to have some status." Bowman opined that Maddie is not a "bitch". Maddie appears arrogant but she is actually "a bit shy and insecure". Bowman said that she is sometimes like Maddie and loves playing her. The actress told Agent2 that Maddie is an "absolute tart". Maddie and Tilly are like "chalk and cheese", but they have a brilliant relationship. Bowman loves the dynamic between Maddie, Tilly and their other best friend, George. Maddie is relaxed when she is with Tilly and George, and her "strong points" come out. Maddie was dubbed "Maddie-avelli" by the official Hollyoaks website, who described her as "a master in deceit, intrigue and social puppetry". OK! magazine described Maddie as a "manipulative queen bee".

In April 2012, a writer from the Press Association that reported that Bowman enjoyed playing the role of the "bitch". Bowman said that she is nothing like her character, but the audience’s perception of her was that she and Maddie were alike. Bowman added that she found this "really quite offensive". She also explained that this was because Maddie is a "psychopath, she's crazy, she's an absolute nightmare". She often feels paranoid and assumes people are judging her when they are not. Maddie makes situations worse by acting like a "psycho" because "she doesn't want people thinking bad things about her".

=== Relationships ===
Maddie is revealed to be the ex-girlfriend of Bart. His girlfriend, Sinead O'Connor (Stephanie Davis) "unimpressed" by their closeness and becomes jealous. However, Clarke told Daniel Kilkelly from Digital Spy that Maddie's feelings for Bart are not reciprocated. Maddie discovers that Bart and Sinead are no longer in a relationship and flirts with him. Bowman told Elizabeth Horsfall from AGENT2 magazine that Maddie is "out to get [Bart] back". Maddie encourages Sinead to begin a relationship with Gaz Bennett (Joel Goonan) to keep her away from Bart. However, when Gaz pursues Maddie - she tells Sinead who does not believe her. Davis told Kilkelly that Sinead thinks that Maddie is trying to meddle in their relationship. Maddie and Sinead have a "Mean Girls-type relationship", where-by they are "trying to be the most popular and well-liked". Davis said that Sinead has "had enough" of Maddie, who is telling her about Gaz's actions. Bowman said that Maddie is "causing a lot of mayhem" for her "rival" Sinead.

In November 2011, Bowman revealed that Maddie would begin a relationship with Callum. The actress said they were an "unlikely couple". Maddie "really falls for [Callum]" and show's her vulnerability. Bowman said "He's cool, but he's got his eye on someone else!" Duncan explained that Callum is not desperate for a relationship, saying [...] "He's much too introverted and likes to keep himself to himself and read his poetry - which unfortunately seems to make him all the more alluring to some of the ladies!" Maddie and Callum develop feelings for one another when they go head-to-head for a debate in college. Maddie tries to make Callum jealous by flirting with Joel Dexter (Andrew Still) on a night out. Maddie kisses Joel and he assumes that they are going to have sex, but she declines. The night "ends in disaster" when Joel angrily shouts at Maddie and upsets her. Callum then comes to Maddie's rescue and they share a "surprise" kiss. Maddie and Callum embark on a relationship. The official Hollyoaks website referred to the couple by the portmanteau "Caddie". Series producer, Emma Smithwick, felt that Maddie and Callum "had such chemistry together and it was time to see something happen [between them]".

=== Departure and death ===
On 21 October 2012 Susan Hill from the Daily Star announced a future storyline would feature a "huge stunt" and that "lots of lives will be lost in the tragedy – the biggest Hollyoaks has seen". Daniel Kilkelly of Digital Spy revealed that "at least two characters are expected to be killed off in the momentous episodes, but their identities will be kept closely under wraps until transmission". Hill noted that Maddie was a possibility to die in the storyline. When the fourth episode of the week of episodes aired Maddie was killed off. Maddie had decided to save herself and not help save Neil, who then also died. When the minibus Maddie had left Neil to die in exploded, the flaming minibus door was propelled into the air before crushing Maddie.

Bowman said she felt it better not to announce her departure from the serial as "to build the suspense and the shock" and so her exit was memorable. She admitted that she had found it difficult to "keep things under wraps" especially with social media nowadays and the large number of cast members. Bowman explained that Maddie is a "bully and a bitch" and "just cares about herself" to the point that even when it comes down to saving lives Maddie "could have helped a mate, she doesn't she saves herself, so I think by the time the door comes the audience is like yes, you deserve that".

== Storylines ==
Bart and his girlfriend, Sinead along with Ruby Button (Anna Shaffer) and Esther Bloom (Jazmine Franks), decide to go on holiday to Abersoch after Bart and Sinead completed their GCSE exams. Bart travels to Abersoch ahead of the girls and they later arrives to find him sleeping on the sofa with Maddie. Maddie tells Sinead that she is Bart's ex-girlfriend and reveals that she is joining the same sixth form college as him. Maddie attends Ruby's and Esther's party in Hollyoaks. Maddie goes to Bart's party and after discovering that he is no longer in a relationship with Sinead, flirts with him. Sinead sees this and kisses Maddie's boyfriend, Toby (Alex Roe), leaving Maddie angry. Sinead insists that she did not know that Toby was Maddie's boyfriend and Maddie forgives her. Sinead tells Maddie that Bart has feelings for trans man, Jason Costello (Victoria Atkin). Maddie then exposes Bart's feelings to the other six formers. Maddie encourages Sinead to begin a relationship with Gaz to keep her away from Bart. Gaz tells Maddie that he prefers her to Sinead and attempts to kiss her, but she refuses. Gaz tells Maddie that he is going to end his relationship with Sinead. Maddie explains this to Tilly, who urges her to tell Sinead, but she refuses. Maddie tells Sinead that Gaz has attempted to kiss her, but she refuses to believe it. Tilly urges Maddie once again when Sinead plans to leave with Gaz. Maddie tells Sinead that Gaz was going to end their relationship; Sinead and Bart reconcile.

Maddie becomes attracted to Callum. She tries to make Callum jealous by flirting with Joel. Maddie kisses Joel and he assumes that they are going to have sex, but she declines. Joel angrily shouts at Maddie and upsets her. Callum sees Maddie upset and they kiss. However, the next day Maddie and Callum ignore each other. Maddie's best friends, Tilly Evans (Lucy Dixon) and George, lock Maddie and Callum in a store room together so they can sort out their issues with one another. Maddie and Callum embark on a relationship. Maddie is shocked when Callum's ex-girlfriend, Tara (Alex Childs), arrives to see him and is revealed to be an older woman. Maddie is embarrassed by this and avoids Callum as Tara wants to reconcile with him. George tries to reunite Maddie and Callum, but she assumes that George has feelings for Callum and upsets him. As Callum prepares to leave with Tara, Maddie admits her feelings to him and they reconcile. Maddie gets frustrated with Jono's new girlfriend Ruby, who she dislikes because she is a school girl and tries to manipulate Jono into breaking up with her by teasing him about her age. The plan works briefly and Jono and Ruby break up but they later reconcile. Maddie learns that George has been staying at Callum's and she interrogates him. He admits that George is missing and he is homeless. Maddie becomes determined to find George and she calls the police. Maddie has sex with Callum but after he leaves her, she goes out looking for him. Upon her return, she catches Callum kissing Theresa McQueen (Jorgie Porter).

Maddie is told by her parents that they are getting a divorce. This makes her upset and angry so she decides to take her father's car along with the other sixth formers, and go to Abersoch. There they stay at her parents Abersoch summer house. Maddie ends up bumping into an old boyfriend who later attacks her. However, Esther saves her and they talk. Esther tries to kiss Maddie, who at first did not mind, however, Maddie finds out that Esther told Tilly about her parents divorcing. Maddie starts bullying Esther after she watches a video Sinead recorded of Esther impersonating her. She eventually turns her friends against her. The day before Ruby and Jono's wedding, Esther witnesses Maddie kissing Jono. Maddie threatens her into keeping quiet, saying she will make her life a lot worse. Tilly witnesses this and confronts Maddie. She tells her that she has changed and she does not know who Maddie is anymore. Maddie, along with Ruby, Sinead, Jono, George and Neil, are involved in a bus crash while trying to get to Gretna Green. They crash into a wedding marquee and are initially trapped in the minibus. Maddie helps George escape and then manages to free herself with George's help. Maddie is about to leave when Neil, who was believed by the group to be dead, awakes and asks her to help him. She leaves Neil and the van explodes. George thanks Maddie for saving his life and she blames Esther for causing the crash. Then the flaming door from the minibus comes hurtling down from the sky and hits her, killing her instantly as her friends look on in horror.

== Reception ==
Maddie, along with the other Sixth form students, was negatively received by viewers. Smithwick revealed that she was aware of the criticism and was working on it. OK! magazine called Bowman a "fast-rising star" and said they were "loving" the character of Maddie. Anthony D. Langford from AfterElton.com said that it was nice to see Maddie's softer side. He had not cared for her while she was being nasty for "no reason other than the script requires her to be". He added that Bowman was "quite lovely".

Carena Crawford from All About Soap branded "minxy Maddie" as a "diva" and added "what a devious little liar she is". Her colleague Laura Morgan said that Maddie and Callum's relationship was the "sexiest thing" in Hollyoaks. In theory their relationship should not work because "she's the blonde queen bee worshipped by her adoring posse, and he's the dark brooding intellect [...] but it does work, and what's more, it's hot!" She opined that they shared an unforgettable "magical first date" which was "the stuff teenage dreams are made of". While they have "great chemistry"; Morgan felt that the early signs of their romance did not look promising. Maddie's "intimacy issues and endless game-playing" mixed with Callum's coldness is not "a recipe for everlasting love". Adam Beresford of Digital Spy described Maddie as the "queen bee of sixth form".

On Maddie's death, Crawford said: "How brutal was that? After the queen bee saved her own skin by leaving poor Neil to die in pain when the minibus exploded, she was a goner herself after the flaming car door flew off the vehicle and crushed her. Talk about jaw-dropping!" Langford commented "Maddie's death was a bit of a shock, especially since she had survived the accident, only to be killed by falling debris. Of course, there are those who say she got what she deserved because she left Neil to die to save herself and I can't say I'm upset that Maddie is gone. She was a character who was mean and nasty, but there seemed to be no reason for it. I don't have a problem with villains and bad girls, but the show seemed to have trouble writing for her other than to be cruel to others, making her a shallow, one dimensional character." Beresford placed Maddie's death at number 3 on his "7 of the most bizarre deaths in soap" list, "the Enjoy The Ride bus crash sealed her fate, after she first saved her friend George but didn't save Neil. The bus exploded, sending a door flying in Maddie's direction, Final Destination-style. The wailing of Sinead and others was drowned out by cheering from viewers."
