= Centrepoint (charity) =

British nonprofit organization

- Founded: 1969; 57 years ago
- Founder: Kenneth Leech
- Type: Charity
- Registration no.: 1014868
- Location: London
- Revenue: £63,162,000 (2025)
- Staff: 462 (March 2022)
- Website: centrepoint.org.uk

Centrepoint is a charity in the United Kingdom which provides accommodation and support to homeless people aged 16–25. The Prince of Wales has been a patron of the organisation since 2005; his first patronage. His mother Diana, Princess of Wales, was patroness of the organisation before she died.

The charity's accommodation includes emergency night shelters, short and long stay hostels, specialist projects for care leavers, ex-offenders and young single parents, foyers and supported flats, and floating support services.

== History ==
The charity was founded by the Anglo-Catholic socialist priest Kenneth Leech and set up its first shelter in St Anne's Church, Soho, on 16 December 1969.

Leech's motivation stemmed from the influx of economic migrants into London in the 1960s in search of employment. However, due to a lack of affordable housing, many found themselves alone and homeless on the city streets. Collaborating with the Simon Community, a collective of homeless individuals and volunteers, Leech aimed to provide temporary shelter for young people facing homelessness. At the first night of the basement's opening, no one attended, but within a month, the space attracted 600 individuals each night. By the end of the first year, the church had provided temporary shelter for 5,000 young people.

The organisation was named Centrepoint in response to the building Centre Point being seen as an "affront to the homeless" for being left empty to make money for the property developer.

In 1986, Centrepoint underwent a notable transformation. Richard Lester, a city broker, was approached by a homeless man named Martin Shaw, who asked for money for a cup of coffee. In response, Richard initially provided £5,000, which Martin utilized to assist the homeless population in London. Their collaboration resulted in the establishment of Centrepoint's inaugural dedicated hostel, featuring over 100 beds. While Richard funded the initiative and set up the first hostel, Martin took on the day-to-day management of the site.

On 7 October 2005, Centrepoint had broadened its geographical reach beyond London, opening an accommodation service in Consett, County Durham

Diana, Princess of Wales, was formerly Centrepoint's patron. In 2005 Centrepoint became Prince William's first patronage.

Its ambassadors include the Radio 1 DJ Sara Cox, the fashion model Lady Kitty Spencer, the actress Lisa Maxwell, and the journalist and presenter Kirsty Young. Sharon Osbourne was previously an ambassador before the charity cut ties with her in April 2026 after her support for a far-right march.

One of the first people Centrepoint helped was Sandy Marks, who went on to be the Mayor of Islington in 1996.

== Activities ==
Through its accommodation, Centrepoint provides approximately 1,200 bed spaces nationwide across England. Additional support services include a skills and employability team and a mental health team. Specialists within the skills and employability team help support young people back into education, training or employment, and the teaching of life skills. Centrepoint also runs volunteering schemes, such as mentoring, which pairs a person with a young person for 12 months. It currently works with almost 100 mentors.

In 2017, Centrepoint launched a helpline that offers instant advice to abuse victims and young people who can no longer stay in the family home. During the first six months, more than 1,600 young people contacted the helpline.

The organization helps support over 16,000 young people every year.

In 2023, Prince William inaugurated a new Centrepoint housing facility in Peckham (south-east London). This housing is designed to accommodate young adults aged 18 to 24, providing them with affordable living arrangements where rent is limited to one-third of their take-home pay. Residents must either hold a job or be engaged in a full-time apprenticeship.

In July 2023, Centrepoint launched a £150,000 brand refresh, including an updated website and logo with the slogan "Ending youth homelessness," aiming to centralize resources for young people.

== See also ==
- Homelessness in the United Kingdom
