= Emma Smithwick =

Irish television producer

- Occupation: TV Producer
- Years active: since 2009
- Television: Hollyoaks

Emma Smithwick is an Irish television producer. Smithwick worked at the BBC for six years where she was involved with several shows for the teen brand BBC Switch and moved on to write for its in-house teen soap The Cut. For the final year of BBC Switch, Smithwick was a commissioning editor. In 2011 Smithwick moved to Hollyoaks to take on the role as Series Editor and later replaced Gareth Philips as the series producer of the soap opera Hollyoaks.

== Career ==
Smithwick started her career as the assistant to the Producer on The Honeymooners feature film for Paramount Pictures. Smithwick then moved to the BBC in 2005 where she worked in Entertainment Events and worked on Saturday night entertainment shows including Strictly Come Dancing and How Do You Solve a Problem Like Maria. Smithwick then moved on to set up BBC Switch with Geoffrey Goodwin and Andy Parfitt. She continued to work at BBC Switch as a creative producer across drama and comedy. While at the BBC, she worked on the teen soap The Cut as a script supervisor and then as a writer.

In May 2011, The producer began working on Channel 4's soap opera Hollyoaks as the acting series editor. Producer replaced Gareth Philips as the series producer. Smithwick's first episode in which she was credited as series producer aired on 26 December 2011. Philips introduced the sixth form students and the uni students into the show and Smithwick continued to keep them at the centre, with the aim of creating a more realistic portrayal of university life through the introduction of these characters and focussing on the friendship groups rather than just on families. Talking about her vision for the show, the producer said: "through the stories that we're telling and the way we're telling them, we want the audience to really engage with the characters. It definitely takes time but when that happens, it means you can do things with the characters and the viewers will really care. I find the worst thing is when you watch certain shows and something horrendous happens, but you don't really care or know why you should care. Emotional integrity is one of the key things that I want to drive through".

One of Smithwick's main storylines, building up for over a year was the teen girl bullying storyline which came to a climax with Esther Bloom attempting suicide. The episode aired and brought in the highest viewing figures for over two years and hit an all-time high on E4. Talking to Radio Times, the producer said she is "passionate about the portrayal of women in the media in general and specifically on television that's aimed at a younger audience. I'm determined to be part of the solution and not part of the problem". She also explained that she would like to "redefine what sexy and glamorous is in Hollyoaks" and present teenage girls with "an emotional encyclopedia that's relevant to the changes and issues in their lives".

Smithwick was responsible for the abolition of the Hollyoaks calendar.

Smithwick executive produced the fifth series of Hollyoaks Later. During her later time on the main soap, the producer produced high-profile storylines such as the Mitzeee v Mercedes feud, Lynsey Nolan's (Karen Hassan) murder, George Smith's (Steven Roberts) struggle with homelessness, Silas' return, Brendan Brady's feud with Walker (Neil Newbon), Ste and Brendan's Dublin reunion, Esther Bloom's bullying and attempted suicide and the "Enjoy The Ride" wedding/bus crash . The producer was also responsible for the introduction of Dr Browning, Martha Kane, Lacey Kane, Joel Dexter, Phoebe Jackson, Ali Grogan, Maxine Minniver and for bringing back John-Paul McQueen. Smithwick oversaw the storylines for Hollyoaks Later in which Brendan Brady discovers that Neil Newbon is an undercover police officer, determined to do whatever it takes to bring him down. The producer worked with Bryan Kirkwood to produce the bus crash storyline to help the serial in "appealing to a wider audience". Kirkwood explained that together he and Smithwick "decided that it was time for a big, show-stopping, blockbuster sequence to grab the audience's attention and hopefully bring them back to Hollyoaks. We realised we needed to engage some of the older audience again and this was how to do it". Smithwick and Kirkwood devised the Enjoy The Ride storyline which saw the deaths of four regular characters through a minibus crash.

On 29 September 2012, it was announced Smithwick would leave Hollyoaks after stepping down from her role as series producer.

At the British Soap Awards 2013, Hollyoaks won 5 awards including Best OnScreen Partnership (Kieron Richardson and Emmett Scalan); Best Actress (Claire Cooper); Sexiest Male (Danny Mac); Spectacular Scene (the bus crash); and Best Newcomer (Joe Thompson)
