= Scarlett Bowman =

English actress (born 1985)

- Born: 10 December 1985 (age 40); Windsor, Berkshire, England, UK
- Occupations: Artist, actress
- Years active: 2009–2012
- Spouse: Rob Colicci (m. 2016)
- Children: 2
- Relatives: Josh Bowman (brother)

Scarlett Bowman (born 10 December 1985) is an English artist and actress best known for her role as Maddie Morrison in the British TV soap opera Hollyoaks.

== Early life ==
Bowman was born in Windsor, Berkshire on 10 December 1985. As a young teenager, she used to sprint for Berkshire in the under-16 squad. She has a younger brother, actor Josh Bowman who starred in the ABC series, Revenge. Before acting, Bowman aspired to be a television presenter.

== Career ==
Bowman's first break was her role on the BBC teen soap short, The Cut.

She is best known for her role as Queen Bee Maddie Morrison on the Channel 4 British soap opera Hollyoaks. Bowman joined the Hollyoaks cast in summer 2011, as part of a group of new sixth-form students, to mixed reactions from the viewers. Bowman has described her character as a "psychopath" and confessed that she loves playing Maddie because it is fun to play a bitch. Bowman has insisted that she is nothing like Maddie in real life, noting that her character is "An absolute nightmare!" and has admitted that she finds it quite offensive when people assume they are alike.

Bowman recently praised Maddie for setting a good example for teenage girls, noting that she should be a role model for young girls who are not ready to lose their virginity. The Hollyoaks storyline, in early 2012, saw her character impose a three-month sex ban on her boyfriend, Callum Kane, until she felt ready to sleep with him.

Bowman has described her experience at Hollyoaks as "Very busy but a lot of fun." and added "I'm loving it. We all get on really, really well here and tend to form bonds quite quickly." She has noted that she is particularly close to fellow Hollyoaks actor Lucy Dixon, with whom she used to share a flat, saying "We do have a great dynamic and spend lots of time together. It happened very quickly. We had no time to get to know everyone, we did our casting together and we said: ‘Let’s move in.’ It’s so special to find someone you really gel with when you’re away from home." Bowman has also stated that she is close friends with Steven Roberts who plays her on screen best friend George Smith.

In 2012, Bowman was nominated for the 'Sexiest female' award at the British Soap Awards but lost out to Coronation Street actress, Michelle Keegan. In November 2012 the actress departed the soap after her character was killed off in an explosive bus crash, her final appearance aired on 15 November 2012.

== Personal life ==
In 2016, Bowman married boyfriend Rob Colicci. In September 2019, she gave birth to their son Rafael. In June 2021, she gave birth to their second child, a daughter called Juno.

== Filmography ==
Year	Title	Role	Notes
2009–10	The Cut	Rosa Willis	23 episodes
2011–12	Hollyoaks	Maddie Morrison	Regular cast member (121 episodes); 21 June 2011 - 15 November 2012; Nominated for Sexiest Female at the British Soap Awards 2012
