= Carli Norris =

English actress

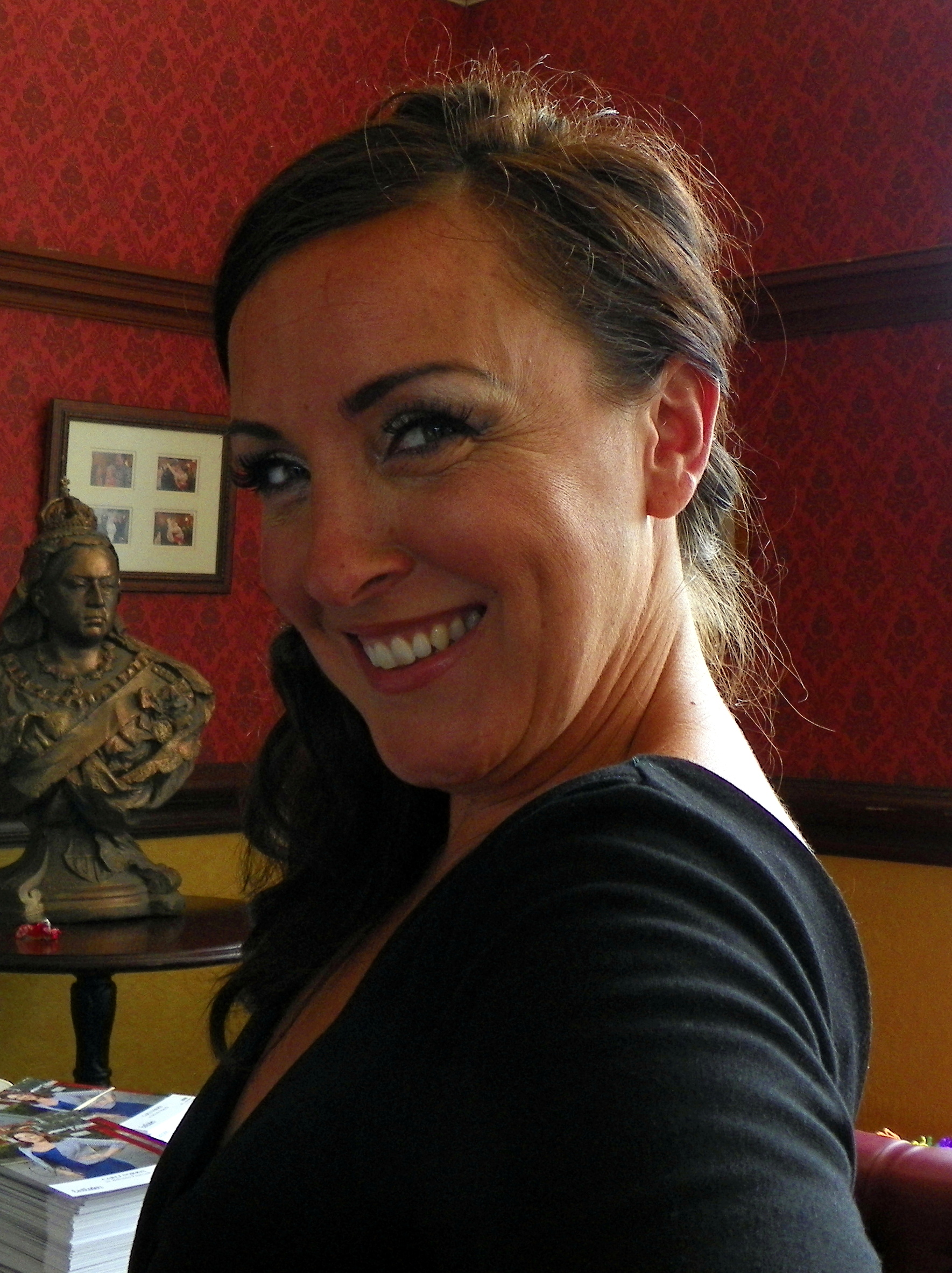
- Born: Carli Jo Norris; 23 June 1974 (age 51); Barking, Essex, England
- Education: RADA
- Occupation: Actress
- Years active: 1997–present
- Notable work: Pygmalion
- Television: Tilly Trotter (1998); Doctors (2000); Hollyoaks (2012–2013); Holby City (2015, 2017); EastEnders (2016)
- Spouses: Gary Turner (m. 2005–2014) Dom Atkins (m. 2017)
- Children: 2

Carli Jo Norris (born 23 June 1974) is an English actress, known for her roles as Anoushka Flynn in Doctors, Martha Kane in Hollyoaks and taking over the role of Belinda Peacock in EastEnders.

== Career ==
In June 1997, just before officially graduating from RADA, she was chosen to play Eliza Doolittle in Pygmalion at the Albery Theatre, directed by Ray Cooney and produced by Marc Sinden for Bill Kenwright. They also produced her next show, which was for the Peter Hall Company, when she appeared in the premiere and tour of Simon Gray's Just The Three of Us with Prunella Scales and Dinsdale Landen.

On television, she first appeared as Alice McMahon in EastEnders; the title character in Catherine Cookson's Tilly Trotter (1999); central characters in In Deep; Grafters; Roger Roger and The Mrs Bradley Mysteries as Prunella 'Plum' Fisher (2000). She was then cast in the BBC soap opera Doctors as Anoushka Flynn. She appeared in the soap for two months. After making her final appearance on 19 May 2000, Anoushka became the first original character to leave Doctors. She then appeared in The Last Detective; Frank Skinner's Shane; The House that Jack Built; Sam's Game; Phoebe in Fanny Hill and as Verity in Slammertime's 2010 episode of My Family. She played the regular role of Martha Kane in Hollyoaks, from January 2012 until November 2013. In 2014, she appeared in the TV Series Agatha Raisin “The Quiche of Death” as Ella Cartwright. Norris also portrayed the role of Fran Reynolds in the BBC medical drama Holby City and went on to portray Belinda Peacock in EastEnders.

== Awards and nominations ==
Year	Award	Category	Nominated work	Result
2016	Inside Soap Awards	Funniest Female	EastEnders	Nominated
