= Laurie Duncan =

English television actor

Laurie Clifford Duncan
- Born: Laurie Clifford Duncan; 2 May 1991 (age 35); Archway, Greater London, England
- Occupation: Actor
- Years active: 2011–present

Laurie Clifford Duncan (born 2 May 1991) is an English television actor best known for his role as Callum Kane on the British soap opera Hollyoaks.

== Early life ==
Laurie was born in Archway, London. He studied performing arts at the Arts Depot in Finchley and became part of the Young Actors Theatre in Islington. Duncan told Digital Spy "Acting is something that I've always wanted to do, for as long as I can remember. I remember being at primary school and doing a play, and that was probably the first time when I thought it could be for me." Duncan is a fan of Arsenal F.C.

== Career ==
Duncan's break through role was on the ITV drama series Law & Order UK as troubled teen Danny Heywood.

He is best known for his role as Callum Kane on the Channel 4 British soap opera Hollyoaks. Laurie joined the Hollyoaks cast in September 2011 and has described his time on the show as "absolutely fantastic so far." And added "We have the best fun here, and I've met some of the best friends that I've ever made. It's a brilliant place to work." Duncan has described his Hollyoaks character Callum "A bit of a mystery man. He doesn't really care about anyone else. The way he thinks is, you lot can conform, but I'm happy reading my books. He doesn't like socialising. He doesn't want to be perceived as cool, but for some reason people think he's cool." "I think, most of the time, Callum is the kind of character who just doesn't really want to be bothered by anything or anyone. He wants to do his own thing, get on with his own life, and he's very introverted" but "Callum is very caring deep down."

Duncan has stated that "Callum's not like me at all, I talk all the time! It's a bit strange for an actor because it's usually all about the dramatic stuff, shouting and crying. Ever since I got the part I've begun reading lots of poetry – because Callum reads a lot of poetry, I thought I'd do a bit of research." "He reads a lot of Bukowski and I haven't put the book down for about three days. He's very dark and very abstract." Laurie has also confessed that he "doesn't get" Callum's heart-throb status "That's Callum, not me." in October 2013, Callum was killed off. His exit came as part of a "cast cull", which coincided with the show's 18th anniversary. Duncan's departure from the show was kept secret to ensure viewers would be surprised. The actor later admitted that he cried when he learned that he was leaving.

Duncan joined the Army Reserve in 2016 and is currently serving with the Honourable Artillery Company based in the City of London.

== Filmography ==
Year	Title	Role	Notes
2011	Law & Order UK	Danny Heywood	Guest Star: 1 Episode 'Line up'
2011–2013	Hollyoaks	Callum Kane	140 episodes
2013	Hollyoaks Later	Callum Kane	Series 6
2018	Man-tis!	Tim Blaisdell	Short film
2022	Muse	Chris	Short film
2024	Decksdark	Logan	Short film
