= List of Hollyoaks characters introduced in 2012 =

Several characters first appeared in the British Channel 4 soap opera Hollyoaks in 2012. All characters are introduced by the series' producer, Emma Smithwick. The first character to be announced was Ally Gorman; soon followed by Phoebe Jackson. While interviewed by Inside Soap, Smithwick announced that she planned to introduce more characters to expand the Kane family. The first to arrive was Martha Kane; soon followed by Lacey Kane – while Amy Downham joined the serial playing the role of Jen Gilmore. Later introductions include "bad boy" character Simon Walker and deaf teenager Dylan Shaw; while Maddie Morrison's father Ed and mother Elizabeth arrived. June saw the arrival of Walt played by former EastEnders actor Cliff Parisi. Liam Gilmore (James Farrar) began appearing from August, while Oscar Osborne was born prematurely to Darren and Nancy Osborne in October. Maxine Minniver, played by Nikki Sanderson, began appearing in November, as did Patrick and Sienna Blake, played by Jeremy Sheffield and Anna Passey respectively, as well as Jim McGinn played by Dan Tetsell and Brendan and Cheryl Brady's father, Seamus shortly followed.

== Phoebe McQueen ==
Phoebe McQueen (also Jackson) played by Mandip Gill, debuted on 17 January 2012. Phoebe is introduced as a regular character. When Callum Kane (Laurie Duncan) visits the squat George Smith (Steven Roberts) is living in he meets Phoebe who also lives there. Phoebe wants Callum to stop interfering because his presence leaves her nervous. Gill told TV Times that her character is "streetwise" and unlike George she has been squatting for a long time. As Callum is George's friend she cannot trust him because "in her eyes anyone from the outside is trouble". Pheobe fears that Callum will report them and so does not want to go into care or lose George. Gill said that "he and her dog Thunder are all she has". This causes tension between Phoebe and George and he decides to move out. Gill said that Phoebe feels "guilty" because George is unwell and puts her feeling aside to ask Callum for help. Gill explained that "by this point, George is very ill and she knows it'd be on her conscience if anything happened to him."

== Martha Kane ==
In January 2012, the serial's producer Emma Smithwick said that she wanted to explore Ash (Holly Weston) and Callum Kane's (Laurie Duncan) backstories. She revealed that she planned to introduce "satellite" family members in the process. Martha will appear on a semi-regular basis. On the serial's official website, Martha is described as being "loveable but feisty, straight-talking and fun". Martha is more of a "liberal parent than a strict one". In November 2013 Digital Spy announced that the actress had left the show, her final episode aired 8 November 2013, Where Martha leaves to go live with her daughter Lacey and Sister.

== Doctor Browning ==
Doctor Paul Browning, played by Joseph Thompson, debuted on-screen during the episode airing on 23 January 2012. Doctor Browning is described as having an "incredible capacity for Sleaze" and as a "man who needs to be in control and is not afraid to use underhand tactics to assert his power over the situation". Doctor Browning and Mercedes McQueen (Jennifer Metcalfe) begin a relationship, with Thompson explaining that the pair are "kindred spirits" with an "undeniable connection" who are "excited by how dangerous the other is". Doctor Browning becomes a suspect in the whodunit murder plot of Lynsey Nolan (Karen Hassan), who he is later revealed to have killed. For his role as Doctor Browning, Thompson was nominated in the "Newcomer" category at the 2013 National Television Awards. Laura Morgan of All About Soap felt that Doctor Browning is a "fairly obvious suspect" in the investigation for Lynsey's murder, while Inside Soap journalist Sarah was shocked at the revelation of Doctor Browning as Lynsey's killer, saying she had overlooked him as a suspect. Anthony D. Langford from AfterElton hoped that the character would not be revealed to be Lynsey's killer due to his enjoyment of Doctor Browning's relationship with Mercedes and their "blistering chemistry".

== Ally Gorman ==
Ally Gorman, played by Daniel O'Connor, made his debut screen appearance on 31 January 2012. The character and O'Connor's casting was announced on 11 December 2011. O'Connor originally auditioned for a different role twice, before being asked to audition for the part of Ally. O'Connor was given the part and began filming his scenes three days later. The actor said of his casting: "I'm really excited about joining Hollyoaks, especially with its recent success. [...] I'm really looking forward to working with some of the show's most popular characters and talented actors." O'Connor signed up for an initial twelve episode stint, but his contract was extended and he became a regular cast member. In April 2012, O'Connor revealed that he would remain on the show "at least until the end of [2012]".

== Deena Hardman ==
Deena Hardman, played by Sian Breckin, debuted on-screen during the episode airing on 31 January 2012 and remained until 13 March 2012. The character was announced while Daniel Kilkelly of Digital Spy interviewed Steven Roberts, who plays George Smith (Steven Roberts). Deena tries to help George and his friend Phoebe Jackson (Mandip Gill) who are living on the streets. Roberts said that Deena is "not all she seems – she's a very manipulative character and she hasn't got their best interests at heart." Deena and her husband, Graham Hardman (Steve Marsh) hold George and Phoebe against their will for human trafficking, but they escape. Hollyoaks later announced that the storyline had not finished and Deena and Graham would continue their scheme. Phoebe has been recaptured by Deena and she leads George into a trap for Deena. Gill told a writer from Inside Soap that George thought Phoebe was safe, but all the time she was locked up by Deena. She manipulates Phoebe into luring George back into her scheme, Gill added that "she'll hurt her dog if she doesn't retrieve George, that dog, Thunder, is all Phoebe has in the whole world." Hollyoaks also confirmed that they planned to air "harrowing scenes" once Deena recaptures George.

Phoebe and George ask Deena for money. She later finds George, giving him money to buy food. Deena invites George and Phoebe back to her house where she gives them food and shelter. She steals George's sim card and convinces them to stay another night. She tells sneaks out to meet Graham and informs him that she can get a good price for Phoebe and George. When Phoebe finds some photos of a lost homeless boy she knows, she realises that Deena has been exploiting children in a sex trade for money. When Deena realises that they have discovered the truth, she and Graham attempt to prevent them from leaving. When Phoebe escapes she goes after her; while Graham goes after George. They are later arrested for their crimes and George and Phoebe escape for good.

== Lacey Kane ==
Lacey Kane
- Hollyoaks character
- Portrayed by: Georgia Bourke
- First appearance: 23 February 2012
- Last appearance: 29 November 2012
- Introduced by: Emma Smithwick
In-universe information
- Occupation: Student
- Mother: Martha Kane
- Brothers: Callum Kane
- Sisters: Ash Kane

Lacey Kane played by Georgia Bourke debuted on-screen during the episode airing on 23 February 2012. In January 2012, the serial's producer Emma Smithwick tolod a columnist for Inside Soap that she wanted to explore Ash (Holly Weston) and Callum Kane's (Laurie Duncan) backstories. She revealed that she planned to introduce "satellite" family members in the process. The first to arrive was their mother, Martha Kane (Carli Norris). The character and Bourke's casting were officially announced on 14 February 2012. As the youngest of the Kane siblings, Lacey moves into family home following some time away. She was described as being "rarely short of something to say" and presents problems for house guest George Smith (Steven Roberts). Bourke told a reporter from Inside Soap that she found working on Hollyoaks "daunting" at first. She added that she found playing Lacey an enjoyable experience.

Bourke said that Lacey has a "childish edge" because she is fifteen years old. Lacey shares a good relationship with her siblings but tends to be sarcastic towards them like a "typical teenager". Bourke said that Lacey is "wary" of George because she does not know him. She thought that Lacey just wanted all the attention for herself because she just moved back in. She wants her family around her and the "big fuss" and does not like the fact that George is there too. Duncan later told Daniel Kilkelly of Digital Spy that Lacey and Callum have a "love-hate" relationship and Callum thinks that he knows best because Lacey is his younger sibling. At times Callum attempts to be the father figure in her life. Lacey knows that he has good intentions but Callum's attitude "annoys her a little bit". Bourke was nominated for "Best Newcomer" at the 2012 Inside Soap Awards for her portrayal of Lacey. Laura Morgan of All About Soap said that Lacey looked like reality television star Shabby Katchadourian. She added that Lacey was "shaping up to be as gobby as Shabby". On 29 January 2013, Daniel Kilkelly from Digital Spy reported that Lacey had departed off-screen and there were no current plans for her to return.

Lacey arrives in Hollyoaks when she decides to move back in with her family. She reveals that her father no longer wants her living with him. She takes a dislike to Callum's friend George who is staying with the family and insults him, but she soon accepts him. When Ash is diagnosed with meningitis, Lacey blames herself because she had often wished Ash dead. Lacey talks to Joel Dexter (Andrew Still) and he says that he understands her. She tries to kiss him but he rejects her advances, with Joel telling her that she is still a child. She later leads Callum to believe that Joel had attempted to seduce her, causing a fight between him and Joel. Ash's boyfriend Ally Gorman (Dan O'Connor) becomes involved with the Kane's and creates a rift between Martha and her children. Martha leaves the family home after an argument with Ash leaving the family struggling. Ally begins helping the family and moves in. Lacey develops romantic feelings for Ally and persistently tries to get his attention. Lacey tries to seduce Ally and he agrees to have sex with her. Lacey's friend Phoebe Jackson (Mandip Gill) becomes concerned when she realises Lacey's attentions and quickly notifies Martha, who interrupts Lacey and Ally. Ash and Callum return home at the same time and Ally fails to explain the situation. He is later arrested for identity fraud as he had been using the identity of a dead army soldier and trying to work his way into the Kane family. Lacey tells Martha she will never forgive her but the Kane's later rebuild their family. It is later revealed that Lacey went to live with her father. When her mother Martha left Hollyoaks following the deaths of Ash and Callum, she went to live with her and her Aunt.

== Jen Gilmore ==
Jen Gilmore
- Hollyoaks character
- Portrayed by: Amy Downham
- Duration: 2012–2013
- First appearance: 13 April 2012
- Last appearance: 4 April 2013
- Introduced by: Emma Smithwick
In-universe information
- Occupation: Student teacher (2012); Art teacher (2012–2013)
- Brothers: Liam Gilmore

Jen Gilmore, played by Amy Downham, debuted on-screen during the episode airing on 13 April 2012. Downham's casting was announced by her management; who also confirmed that Jen is a regular character. Will Martin from CultBox said that Jen is a "bohemian" teacher and a "fiery newcomer". Jen departed the serial on 4 April 2013.

Dixon told Daniel Kilkelly of Digital Spy that Jen arrives to view an art event organised by Tilly Evans (Lucy Dixon). Jen catches Tilly's attention and she wants to find out more about her. Dixon explained that Jen is an art teacher and "she gives her blunt opinion" on Tilly's work; which gets the pair of to a "bad start". However, they meet again and Jen invites Tilly along to Crosby Beach to view Another Place. While Tilly is not very daring – Jen is "quite adventurous" and Tilly likes that part of her personality. It "draws Tilly in" and "shows her a different side to things". As they spend the day together they grow close; Dixon said that "Tilly's just in awe of Jen, she's so free and she's so full of life, and that's what Tilly ends up falling in love with." However, the situation becomes complicated when Tilly lets Jen believe that she is a university student. Jen starts her new role as a student teacher at Hollyoaks Sixth Form College, where Tilly actually studies. Tilly tries to keep it a secret from Jen, but she becomes trapped in a fire at the college and Jen discovers the truth. Dixon added that Jen and Tilly "are not meant to be together, as student-teacher relationships are forbidden" – but felt it is an interesting storyline for Hollyoaks viewers. Laura Morgan from All About Soap praised Jen's inclusion because it was "high time" Tilly had romance in her life. She branded Jen as "mysterious" and the moment Tilly discovers that Jen is her teacher as an "OMG" moment. Anthony D. Langford from AfterElton said that Hollyoaks were rushing Tilly and Jen's story "with its usual breathless pace"; but was interested to see the out come of their romance.

Jen arrives to view an art exhibition in College Coffee and criticises Tilly's work. She later asks Tilly to accompany her to the beach to view statues. They grow close and end up kissing. Tilly tells her that she is studying at HCC; unaware that Jen has secured a job as a student teacher at her sixth form college. Jen moves in with Diane O'Connor (Alex Fletcher). After learning about Jen, Tilly avoids her by hiding in a room, but Tilly gets locked in as a fire blazes in the school. When she is rescued, Jen takes her to hospital and Tilly apologises for lying to her. Jen starts to draw Tilly and they almost kiss but are interrupted by Mr. Keeler (Carl Cieka). Jen tells Tilly that she cannot risk her job by dating a student. Jen presumes Tilly is talking about her and dismisses her from a lesson. Tilly attends Jen's debate in an attempt to flaunt her intelligence. She later apologises to Jen for trying to put her career in jeopardy and tries to kiss her. Jen tells her they can just be friends. In the end, Tilly and Jen get back together secretly. Diane founds out about it and tells Jen to stay away from Tilly. Tilly and Jen keep seeing each other untobeknown that Diane is secretly watching them from a distance.

Jen and Tilly arrange to spend the night at a hotel, but their plans are ruined when Jen's brother, Liam (James Farrar), turns up. Tilly goes to see Jen at Diane's but just as she is about to knock on the door Diane tells Tilly Jen doesn't want to see her and she should go. Later, Diane tells Jen that Tilly was looking for her and that she needs to tell Tilly nothing can happen between them. Tilly is angry about the cancellation when she sees Jen walking through the village with Liam drinking out of a champagne bottle.

After some soul-searching and indecisive moments Jen and Tilly continue their affair in secret, until Tilly misunderstands a conversation she has with Jen about travelling the world. Tilly thinks Jen is intimating that they should leave Hollyoaks, whereas Jen is just wistfully reminiscing. Jen is offered the job of art teacher at Hollyoaks college which she accepts, whilst Tilly buys round-the-world travel tickets. Jen eventually tells Tilly she cannot go with her and the two quickly fall apart. Tilly steals Jen's car as retribution, but only gets herself into more trouble. Tilly threatens to expose their affair and ruins Jen's career, and Tilly joins Jen's art class in the new school year.

By January 2013, Jen is continuing her affair with Tilly, and Jen sees Esther Bloom (Jazmine Franks) at the Folley with a vodka bottle and pills (which she later uses to attempt suicide). However, she is with Tilly, so she leaves. When Tilly finds out that Jen could have stopped Esther, she threatens to reveal their relationship, and so Jen reports to the head teacher that Tilly is stalking her, resulting in her being expelled, whilst Jen is promoted.

A few months later, Tilly overhears Jen calling Esther unstable and a freak, and so Tilly and Esther plot their revenge. They sabotage Jen's presentation by adding photos of her and Tilly together, which she unknowingly shows during an open evening, to an audience which includes new head teacher Patrick Blake (Jeremy Sheffield), and she is fired. Tilly, Esther, Ruby Button (Anna Shaffer) and Sinead O'Connor (Stephanie Davis) then get her arrested, and her and Tilly finally apologise to each other as she is taken away.

== Mel Jackson ==
Mel Jackson
- Hollyoaks character
- Portrayed by: Emma Rydal
- Duration: 2012–2013
- First appearance: 19 April 2012
- Last appearance: 13 November 2013
- Introduced by: Emma Smithwick (2012); Bryan Kirkwood (2013)
In-universe information
- Occupation: Prostitute (2012)
- Daughters: Phoebe McQueen

Mel Jackson, played by Emma Rydal, debuted on-screen during the episode airing on 19 April 2012 until 25 April 2012. On 1 March 2012, Rydal told a writer from the News and Star that she had joined Hollyoaks; playing the guest role of Mel. She explained that Mel is the mother of an established character who would "really shake things up". She remained secretive about her role and but added that Mel is a "nasty character". More details surrounding the character were announced while Laura Morgan from All About Soap interviewed Mandip Gill, who plays Phoebe Jackson. Mel is Phoebe's "wayward mother"; who arrives after Phoebe starts a fire and is reprimanded by the law. Gill said that it is a "massive shock" for her character because she has not seen Mel for a long time. It is apparent from their first scenes that they do not get on well and share a "volatile" relationship. Phoebe has done many things without her and Gill explained that Phoebe no longer views her as a mother and rather "just a person called Mel". Jacqui McQueen (Claire Cooper) and Mel soon argue over who gets to keep Phoebe in their care. She has been keeping a "dark secret" about Mel and when it is revealed; Gill opined that it makes "explosive" and "dramatic" viewing.

Gill later told Laura-Jayne Tyler of Inside Soap that when Mel first arrives; they have to keep up a "facade" that they are a family. This is so the social services will not become involved. The actress revealed that Mel is a prostitute and Phoebe goes home with her and "finds that nothing has changed – Mel's still bring men to the house". Phoebe feels safer on the street than living with Mel. Jacqui and her boyfriend, Rhys Ashworth (Andrew Moss) convince Mel that her daughter will be better off with them, Gill said that it could be the last viewers see of Mel, but she did not believe Mel will just give up that easy.

All About Soap's Morgan described Mel as Phoebe's "waster mum" who would "rather focus on entertaining her grubby clients than look after her daughter". She branded Mel's introduction as "a stroke of genius on Hollyoaks' part" because it explained why Phoebe is the way she is. Morgan concluded that there is no real relationship between the two and Phoebe would be better without Mel in her life.

In November 2013, Gill revealed that Rydal had filmed more scenes as Mel. She will feature in a storyline where Phoebe tracks her down in Northern Ireland to gain her permission to marry Vincent Elegba (John Omole).

Mel accompanies Phoebe to the police station after she starts a fire. She defends her daughter and requests that the social services do not become involved. When Phoebe is released, Mel tells her that she does not want her to come home with her – but does not want her attract the attentions of the social services either. She then argues with Jacqui in the village. Mel visits Jacqui and Rhys demanding that they let Phoebe move back home. They refuse and she reveals that Phoebe is only fifteen and she will call the police. Phoebe returns home with Mel, where it is revealed that she is a prostitute. After Mel sleeps with a client, Phoebe runs away again. Jacqui and Mercedes McQueen (Jennifer Metcalfe) visit Mel and offer her a solution – that Jacqui and Rhys care for Phoebe and she can continue to receive child support money – which she eventually accepts.

== Simon Walker ==
Simon Walker
- Hollyoaks character
- Portrayed by: Neil Newbon
- Duration: 2012–2013
- First appearance: 11 May 2012
- Last appearance: 19 March 2013
- Introduced by: Emma Smithwick
- Spin-off appearances: Hollyoaks Later (2012)
In-universe information
- Occupation: Undercover police officer (2012)
- Brothers: Cam Walker

Simon Walker, played by Neil Newbon, debuted on-screen during the episode airing on 11 May. Newbon's casting was revealed while he attended the British Soap Awards. Newbon told a reporter from What's on TV that he found joining Hollyoaks a "positive experience" because he enjoyed working with the cast. Newbon later told Daniel Kilkelly from Digital Spy that he was having a "wonderful experience" at Hollyoaks and felt "incredibly lucky" to be playing Walker. Newbon auditioned for the role in London and upon reading the script, he was "very surprised by how unusual the character was for Hollyoaks". He was also surprised by the nature of the themes his storyline will explore. Newbon said that a mixture of the script, the character and the serial's producer Emma Smithwick made him "really happy" to take the role. The character has a natural charisma and can be quick to understand those around him. As he is "very intuitive", Walker picks and chooses when he needs to be "charismatic and the centre of attention" or "deliberately blend into the background". Newbon said that this trait is a "powerful tool" for Walker to have.

Emmett J. Scanlan, who plays Brendan Brady, said that Walker is the serial's new "bad boy" and rival for Brendan. There is a "mutual respect" between the two characters but ultimately they are arch enemies. The initial idea of what Walker is about had developed into a situation resembling a game of chess. Newbon added that Walker and Brendan are "grand masters at what they do, they come from different points of view and they sort of meet over this game". Newbon told Kilkelly that Walker's storyline involving Brendan is "very edgy, full of conflict and packed with surprising twists and turns". He opined that the two characters are "evenly matched" and Walker is a "great sparring partner for Brendan". He enjoyed working alongside Scanlan because they have a similar methodology in acting. Both actors "believe in being in the moment and trying to play characters truthfully and honestly". Walker also becomes involved with Brendan's sister, Cheryl Brady (Bronagh Waugh). Walker likes the fact that Cheryl has strong character and is her own woman. She also has vulnerability about her; Newbon said that this was the reason that Walker is attracted to her. The "element of attraction" is present between the two as she sees Walker "in a different light at certain points" in the story.

Lynsey Nolan (Karen Hassan) is murdered in a whodunit storyline. Digital Spy reported that Walker had motive to kill her due to her coming close to discovering his secret. A promotional image featuring Walker later confirmed him as a suspect in the mystery. At the 2012 Inside Soap Awards Newbon was nominated for "Best Bad Boy" for his portrayal of Walker.

On 20 December 2012, it was announced that Rachel Shenton, who plays Mitzeee, would leave the serial and that Walker would return when Carl Costello (Paul Opacic) seeks justice for Riley's death.

Walker arrives in Hollyoaks and meets Cheryl and Cindy Cunningham (Stephanie Waring) and they compete for his attention. When he realises that Cheryl is Brendan's sister, he asks her on a date. He then goes to visit Brendan and gives him a place to stay because Walker claims that he has no money. Cheryl finds a large amount of money in Walker's bag and he is forced to tell Brendan that he is doing a deal. Brendan asks to be part of the deal and Walker agrees, but Joel Dexter (Andrew Still) is stabbed by Walker's contacts. Brendan orders him to leave. He disappears for a short time, but eventually returns and reestablishes his partnership with Brendan. He and Brendan plan a major heist, from which they hope to steal a million pounds. However, their plan goes awry and the heist fails. During that time, it is revealed that Walker is an undercover police officer with the goal of bringing Brendan down. Back in his drug dealing days, Brendan once sold ecstasy to Walker's younger brother, Cam, who overdosed and suffered severe brain damage. Walker continually visits his brother in the hospital. Lynsey eventually catches on to Walker's true identity as a police officer, which threatens Walker's plans for Brendan. Shortly before her death, Walker visits her and he reveals to her that he is undercover. While he is there, Dr. Paul Browning (Joseph Thompson), turns up to confront Lynsey about Mercedes McQueen (Jennifer Metcalfe) stabbing herself. Walker hides in the kitchen as Lynsey and Doctor Browning argue and he strangles her to death. Walker does nothing, even as Lynsey screams out his name. Browning is later arrested for Lynsey's murder, clearing Walker as a suspect.

Walker learns Cam has a serious infection and he is with him when he dies. Walker is devastated and becomes even more determined to get his revenge on Brendan. He steps up his plan for revenge when Brendan calls him for his help in disposing of Joel's stepfather, Mick's body. While they are at a rest stop, Walker hears a noise from the boot of the car and discovers that Mick is still alive. He tells him that he is an undercover police officer, and that Brendan will pay for what he has done to him, before suffocating him with the plastic sheet that he is wrapped in. In an attempt to get close to Brendan, Walker kisses him and allows Brendan to have sex with him. At the holiday home Brendan admits to Walker that his father abused him (something he has never told anyone). Shortly after Walker calls his police contact and reveals that he finally has Brendan where he wants him, but is surprised when Brendan reveals himself to be on the other end of the phone call. Shortly after an explosion occurs and Brendan is injured. At the hospital, Walker tells Brendan that he is going to hurt his loved ones and admits to watching Lynsey die. Brendan gets a gun for protection, but Walker steals it. Brendan later finds Walker holding Ste at gunpoint and tackles him, resulting in Walker firing the gun and accidentally hitting Riley Costello (Rob Norbury). Walker quickly leaves the scene and then calls Brendan, revealing that he has his son, Declan, and is planning on injecting him with drugs until he overdoses. Brendan, Ste and Doug find Declan unconscious in a lock-up and get him to the hospital. Walker sends Brendan a video message and, believing Declan to be dead, says that it is goodbye.

Walker would later return on 25 January 2013 after being tracked down by Carl in a storyline involving Mitzeee seeing the pair attempt to avenge Riley's death. Mizteee decided to go against the revenge plot and was going to inform Brendan of Walker's return, however Brendan was away in Ireland and Mizteee left Maxine in charge to telling Brendan. Walker later found out about Maxine's knowledge and tricked her into going against Brendan, she was later kidnapped after figuring out the truth. Walker's feud with Brendan finally came to an end, while during a fight Brendan kicked Walker into the path of an oncoming train killing him.

== Ed Morrison ==
Ed Morrison
- Hollyoaks character
- Portrayed by: Dominic Rickhards
- First appearance: 21 May 2012
- Last appearance: 19 July 2012
- Introduced by: Emma Smithwick
In-universe information
- Occupation: Property Developer
- Wife: Elizabeth Morrison
- Daughters: Maddie Morrison

Ed Morrison, played by Dominic Rickhards, debuted on-screen during the episode airing on 21 May 2012. He last appeared on 19 July 2012. The character was announced on 8 May 2012 by a writer from All About Soap, who also reported that he would date established character Carmel Valentine (Gemma Merna). Merna told a reporter from Inside Soap that Carmel has an instant attraction to Ed. Theresa McQueen (Jorgie Porter) notices the attraction and introduces them to each other; he then asks a "dead excited" Carmel out on a date. The actress described Ed as being "suave and handsome" and he owns a "flashy" vehicle. Carmel likes this and thinks that he "ticks all the boxes in what she's looking for". In July 2012, Ed arrived with a young woman at his family's own house in Abersoch, unaware Maddie and her friends were holidaying there.

Ed meets Carmel in the gym and asks her out on a date. They go for a drink together and get on well. He asks her out to lunch and Carmel enjoys the date. After she leaves, Ed puts his wedding ring back on. Ed goes to meet Carmel in college coffee and kisses her. His daughter Maddie Morrison (Scarlett Bowman) notices and shouts at him because he is still married to her mother. Carmel then refuses to speak to Ed. He later does business with Brendan Brady (Emmett J. Scanlan) and Simon Walker (Neil Newbon). His wife Elizabeth (Helen Grace) who is later introduced, announces to Maddie that the couple are filing for divorce.

== Dylan Shaw ==
Dylan Shaw
- Hollyoaks character
- Portrayed by: Mikey Riddington-Smith
- Duration: 2012–2013
- First appearance: 9 May 2012
- Last appearance: 21 February 2013
- Introduced by: Emma Smithwick
In-universe information
- Occupation: Student

Dylan Shaw, played by Mikey Riddington-Smith debuted on-screen during the episode airing on 9 May 2012. The character was announced on 29 January 2012 by Daniel Kilkelly from Digital Spy and was then named "Mikey". Hollyoaks put out a casting call for deaf actors over the age of sixteen to audition for the role. Their requirements were that all candidates must be fully or partially deaf and have the ability to communicate in sign language. The role was described as a "brilliant role for a young deaf actor". The character was planned to be a guest role; with the potential of becoming a series regular. In June 2012, Kilkelly reported that Mikey's name was changed to Dylan after the casting stage. He is confirmed that the character would return to the series. In June 2013, Dylan was moved to the past character section on the official Hollyoaks website.

Dylan arrives at an open day at Hollyoaks Sixth Form College. He meets Lacey Kane (Georgia Bourke) and they spend the day together. He explains to her that he is deaf, but after she has an argument with Phoebe Jackson (Mandip Gill), Dylan quickly leaves. Lacey fails to get his contact details. Dylan returns for the start of sixth form. He sees Lacey again and they chat.

== Walt ==
Walt, played by ex-EastEnders actor Cliff Parisi, debuted on-screen during the episode airing on 5 June 2012. The character was first announced on 16 April 2012 by Daniel Kilkelly from Digital Spy, who revealed that Parisi had joined the serial in a guest role. Hollyoaks had decided to remain secretive about the character's storylines, but revealed that his name is Walt. When Parisi started filming with the serial, he stated via his Twitter account that his role would last just a "few" episodes and added that he had fun during filming.

Walt arrives after Dirk Savage (David Kennedy) asks for help with his family crisis. Walt tells the Savages that his fair ground is doing a world tour and he invites the family along. However, Will Savage (James Atherton) refuses to go along and he and Dodger (Danny Mac) come up with a different plan. Walt then helps with the Savage family fundraiser. He later makes comments about Dodger and Will, prompting Dodger to question his motives. Walt tells Dodger that Dirk is not his biological father and leaves to go on his tour.

== Ryan ==
Ryan
- Hollyoaks character
- Portrayed by: George Evans
- First appearance: 9 July 2012
- Last appearance: 29 August 2012
- Introduced by: Emma Smithwick

Ryan, played by George Evans, debuted on-screen during the episode airing on 9 July 2012. Evans' casting was announced in May 2012. Ryan is a semi-regular character who was introduced during a storyline in conjunction with Company magazine. Ryan is an intern at the magazine headquarters working alongside the established character of George Smith (Steven Roberts) and Esther Bloom (Jazmine Franks). A writer from the publication revealed that Ryan would be "entwined in an office romance" with the character of George who is also on a placement.

Ryan and George bond while attending their internship. Franks told Daniel Kilkelly from Digital Spy that Esther "meddles" and tells Ryan and George what she thinks should happen. But she warned that Esther "tries to give advice, but it usually backfires". While Roberts told the reporter that he thought it was nice for George to explore romance. But because of his past he is cautious of letting new people into his life. He explained that "Ryan is a lot more confident" and "outgoing" than George. These traits that Ryan possesses are good for George, Roberts felt that his character needed someone like Ryan. He added that "I wouldn't say they're chalk and cheese, but they are different." Ryan later arrives to visit George while he is on holiday in Abersoch. This creates a problem for George because he sees it as "his two worlds colliding". Roberts continued by noting that George feels awkward about introducing Ryan to his friends because is unsure of how to deal with him. He was also unsure of how their relationship would develop. But it is "blossoming and there is an attraction between them".

Esther and George meet Ryan when they intern at Company magazine. Ryan shows them around and helps them with their assignments. During a night out, Ryan tries to kiss George, but he rejects him. George and Ryan promise to stay in touch and they start texting each other. Esther later invites Ryan to join her friends and George at Abersoch. Ryan and George spend some time together and begin dating. George begins to avoid Ryan when they talk about sex. He tries to seduce Ryan after a few drinks of alcohol. Ryan nearly leaves George, but he tells him that he is a virgin and Ryan decides to take things slow. Ryan later visits George in the village but they do not spend time together because Phoebe Jackson (Mandip Gill) becomes jealous. George presumes that Ryan wants sex and snubs a date. Pheobe tells George that Ryan will say that he loves George just for sex. Ryan confronts George and confesses his love, he informs Ryan of Phoebe's prediction, causing Ryan to leave.

== Liam Gilmore ==
Liam Gilmore
- Hollyoaks character
- Portrayed by: James Farrar
- Duration: 2012–2013
- First appearance: 6 August 2012
- Last appearance: 4 April 2013
- Introduced by: Emma Smithwick
In-universe information
- Occupation: Businessman; Barman
- Sisters: Jen Gilmore

Liam Gilmore, played by James Farrar, is the brother of Jen Gilmore (Amy Downham). The character's debut episode aired on 6 August 2012. Liam departed on 4 April 2013. Farrar originally auditioned for a different role in Hollyoaks but months later, he was called back and told he had been cast as Liam, a part which he did not have to audition for. Farrar described Liam, saying: "Liam is a cheeky chappy, he's a charmer and he's happy-go-lucky. The essence is in the word 'lucky', because everything works out for him. He tends to get what he wants, and he won't stop until he gets it! Liam is also a smooth talker, he's a positive guy and he looks out for his sister a hell of a lot. You'll see that in the first week or so – Liam and Jen are very close, and he's there to help her out in any way he can. He wants to push her career, but at the same time, he doesn't want to ruin her personal relationships". Liam discovers Jen is in a relationship with her student Tilly Evans (Lucy Dixon) which causes "friction" between Liam and Tilly. Farrar added that his character "come in, caused a bit of havoc and ruffled some feathers within their relationship, which was going so smoothly beforehand". The actor said that Liam and Jen are "very close" and he has "looked out for Jen forever"; however Jen is not "appreciative" of Liam getting involved in her and Tilly's relationship as it does not concern him. Farrar said that his chemistry with Downham "is buzzing" and that "a few of the directors have said that we've got quite a natural click between us". E4's official Hollyoaks website described Liam as someone who has "come to Hollyoaks in search of fun and adventure" and is "Laid-back, easy-going, charming, sporty, with a close bond to his sister Jen. Lives for today".

Liam catches the attentions of Diane O'Connor (Alex Fletcher) and Martha Kane (Carli Norris) at the local pub. They take an interest to him and Diane asks if he needs directions, but Liam says he is waiting for someone. He later finds Jen and it is revealed that they are brother and sister. Liam finds out that Jen is in a relationship with Tilly Evans, one of her students.

== Marie Fielding ==
Marie Fielding
- Hollyoaks character
- Portrayed by: Emma Campbell Jones (2012); Rita Simons (2024–2025)
- Duration: 2012, 2024–2025
- First appearance: 11 September 2012
- Last appearance: 29 October 2025
- Introduced by: Emma Smithwick (2012); Hannah Cheers and Angelo Abela (2024)
- Crossover appearances: Brookside (2025)
In-universe information
- Other names: Marie Dexter
- Husband: Mick Cornus (until 2012)
- Sons: Joel Dexter; Abe Fielding; Arlo Fielding
- Grandsons: Noah Dexter; Joseph McQueen
- Granddaughters: Clara Dexter

Marie Fielding (also Dexter), played by Emma Campbell Jones in 2012 and Rita Simons in 2024, is the mother of Joel Dexter (Andrew Still/Rory Douglas-Speed) and she tries to bond with Joel. Theresa McQueen (Jorgie Porter) presumes that Joel is sleeping with Marie but they soon correct her. Marie reveals that she no longer wants to be with Mick Cornus (Gavin Marshall) because he hits her. When Mick arrives she agrees to resume their relationship despite Joel's pleas. She appears in two episode between 11 and 12 September 2012.

On 15 July 2023, it was announced that Rita Simons, who is best known for her role as Roxy Mitchell in the BBC soap opera EastEnders, would be joining Hollyoaks. The characters casting and details were not initially announced however. Upon her casting, executive producer Hannah Cheers stated: "Rita's new character will certainly ruffle feathers and is set to stir the pot, Hollyoaks fans can expect plenty of fireworks." In January 2024, it was announced that Simons would be taking over the role of Marie. Rita Simons will star in the series Drama Queens showing her joining the soap. On 11 September 2024, it was announced that Simons had been "axed" from the show ahead of its historic "time jump", which will see a large portion of the cast depart the serial as it prepares to drop to three episodes per week. However, Marie had survived the Motorbike crash and returned on 17 September 2024 (set in 2025).

On 22 October 2025, Marie appears in the crossover episode between Hollyoaks and Brookside with the Marie even relocating to Brookside Close once her character left a few episodes after the crossover where she would be helped in the move by Brookside character Billy Corkhill (John McArdle).

== Oscar Osborne ==
Oscar Osborne
- Hollyoaks character
- Portrayed by: Ralph and Zack Norman (2012–2015); Noah Holdsworth (2015–present)
- Duration: 2012–2020, 2022–present
- First appearance: 3 October 2012
- Introduced by: Emma Smithwick
In-universe information
- Family: Osborne
- Father: Darren Osborne
- Mother: Nancy Hayton
- Brothers: Charlie Dean (adoptive); Phoenix Hathaway (adoptive)
- Half-brothers: JJ Osborne
- Half-sisters: Frankie Osborne; Morgan Osborne
- Grandfathers: Jack Osborne; Charles Hayton
- Grandmothers: Sandy Roscoe; Margaret Hayton
- Uncles: Joe Roscoe; Freddie Roscoe; Ziggy Roscoe; Robbie Roscoe; Jason Roscoe
- Aunts: Ruth Osborne; Becca Hayton; Bethany Cunningham
- First cousins: Charlie Dean; JJ Roscoe; Gabriel McQueen; Lexi Roscoe
- Other relatives: Billy Brodie; Eva Falco

Oscar Riley Osborne made his first screen appearance on 3 October 2012. Oscar is Darren (Ashley Taylor Dawson) and Nancy Osborne's (Jessica Fox) son. Darren and Nancy learned they were expecting a baby in May 2012. All About Soap's Claire Crick commented "After their heartbreak following Nancy's recent miscarriage, it's about time the pair had something to celebrate". Nancy goes into labour three months premature, after feeling tired, dizzy and sick for a few days beforehand. She realises that she has to go to the hospital, where she has an emergency caesarean section and gives birth to a baby boy. Fox researched premature births before filming the scenes and she explained "Obviously there's a bit of artistic licence that goes into the scripts, to make things more dramatic or to let the story flow better. But I did do a lot of reading about premature birth and premature babies – all the things that can go wrong and all the things that can go right". Oscar is rushed to the neonatal intensive care unit following his birth and the doctors inform Darren and Nancy that their son may have brain damage, may be disabled and may be deaf and that he is fighting a serious infection he developed: necrotizing enterocolitis. The family hold a christening and Darren and Nancy decide to name their son Oscar.

Child actor Noah Holdsworth gained a nomination for "Best Young Performer" in the Radio Times soap awards 2024. The following year, Holdsworth was shortlisted for Best Young Performer at the 2025 British Soap Awards.

Darren and Nancy bring Oscar home for Christmas 2012 and have trouble settling him when he is crying. Darren drops a vase near Oscar, who is sleeping. When Oscar does not wake, Darren and Nancy are concerned so consult the hospital who reveal that initial tests were inconclusive and further testing has revealed that Oscar is not responding to sound and is profoundly deaf. Oscar's deafness causes tension between Darren and his stepmother Frankie Osborne (Helen Pearson) fighting, leading to Darren walking out. Darren spends the day contemplating how Oscar would be affected by his deafness and begins learning sign language and buys specialist toys to support Oscar. Darren and Nancy think of getting cochlear implants for Oscar so he can hear but Nancy is put off by the operation. Despite this, Nancy eventually allows the operation to take place and in February 2014, Oscar has the operation and it is successful. In February 2017, Nancy's nephew Charlie Dean (Charlie Behan), who Nancy and Darren become guardians to, tells Oscar that Nancy is dying from multiple sclerosis after Charlie has been finding searches about it. Darren and Nancy tell Charlie and Oscar that Nancy has multiple sclerosis. In August 2017, Darren and Nancy renew their vows but Darren gets arrested after dealing drugs.

Unbeknownst to the family, Frankie Osborne (Isabelle Smith) is being sexually abused by twin brother JJ Osborne (Ryan Mulvey). At a desperate attempt to retain Nancy to her bedroom at night, she overdoses Morgan on Antihistamine's to keep her sedated so she would not wake up to interrupt Nancy, however Morgan is discovered by Darren severely ill and choking on her vomit, an incident that was initially reported on 7 May 2024. Later, Nancy asks Frankie if she knows anything about the incident, to which JJ tells her it was Oscar.

== Eoghan Nolan ==
Eoghan Nolan
- Hollyoaks character
- Portrayed by: Alan Turkington
- First appearance: 22 October 2012
- Last appearance: 26 October 2012
- Introduced by: Emma Smithwick
In-universe information
- Sisters: Lynsey Nolan

Eoghan Nolan, played by Alan Turkington, made his first screen appearance on 22 October 2012. The character and casting was announced on 2 October. Daniel Kilkelly from Digital Spy reported Turkington had a guest part and was expected to appear in four episodes. Kilkelly stated "Eoghan's arrival could tie in with recent speculation that Lynsey's funeral will soon take place now that the investigation into her murder has ended." He added that viewers may also learn about Eoghan's history with Cheryl (Bronagh Waugh) and Brendan Brady (Emmett J. Scanlan).

== Maxine Minniver ==
Maxine Minniver is played Nikki Sanderson, made her first screen appearance on 6 November 2012. The character and Sanderson's casting was announced on 28 September 2012. Sanderson joined the serial on a year contract. On her casting, the actress said: "Being a member of the Hollyoaks team has so far been an absolute pleasure, and I am excited about what the future holds for my character. I feel very lucky to be part of such a wonderful show and to be working with an amazing team". Maxine was created as the sister of established character Mitzeee (Rachel Shenton). She has been described as being "a confident, lively and flirtatious bombshell, who lives her life on the edge and can spot an opportunity a mile off". Maxine does not mind taking risks and Digital Spy's Daniel Kilkelly stated that she would cause fireworks in the village. Sanderson described her character as being "a really interesting character to play" as she "has got a heart and she is lovely, but she just doesn't show it at first! When she first arrives, she's more interested in herself and how everyone should fit into her life, rather than her fitting into theirs". Sanderson added that Maxine is "a bit feisty, very confident and knows exactly what she wants, how she wants it and exactly how she's going to get it!"

== Sienna Blake ==
Sienna Blake, played by Anna Passey, made her first screen appearance on 21 November 2012. Daniel Kilkelly from Digital Spy announced the character's introduction to the serial on 7 October 2012. He said that she would be introduced in a "shock storyline twist" when established character Dodger Savage (Danny Mac) discovers she is his twin sister. Kilkelly tipped the character to cause "mayhem" in the village upon her arrival. It was announced that actress Emily Lawrence would play the character and that the character will be introduced along with her father, Patrick Blake (Jeremy Sheffield). Of her casting, Lawrence said: "Joining Hollyoaks is going to be fun and a great experience for me. It goes without saying that working with Jeremy is brilliant". Kilkelly announced on 26 October 2012 that the character had been recast and would instead be played by Anna Passey. Dodger decides to find Patrick and while visiting him sees a girl who he later discovers is Patrick's daughter, Sienna. Dodger reveals that he is Patrick's son but Patrick believes his son is dead as Sienna and Dodger's mother, Anna (Saskia Wickham) told him he was. Mac explained "It's an afternoon of bombshells because after Dodger proves his real identity, Patrick reveals Sienna is his twin sister". He added that Sienna and Patrick later arrive in the village and "try to build a relationship with Dodger". Official E4 Hollyoaks website describes Sienna being "swathed in mystery and intrigue". Passey describes Sienna as a "very guarded, intelligent and feisty" character.

== Patrick Blake ==
Patrick Blake, played by Jeremy Sheffield, made his first screen appearance on 21 November 2012. The character's introduction to the serial and Sheffield's casting were announced on 7 October 2012. Patrick is the biological father of established character Dodger Savage (Danny Mac).

== Jim McGinn ==
Jim McGinn
- Hollyoaks character
- Portrayed by: Dan Tetsell
- Duration: 2012–2014
- First appearance: 30 November 2012
- Last appearance: 11 February 2014
- Introduced by: Bryan Kirkwood
In-universe information
- Occupation: Solicitor; Club owner (2013)

Jim McGinn played by Dan Tetsell debuted on-screen during the episode airing on 30 November 2012. Tetsell's management confirmed that he would be playing a regular role in Hollyoaks. On 17 November 2012, a writer from TV Magazine announced the character's arrival. They added he would be Mercedes McQueen's (Jennifer Metcalfe) lawyer who is "unconventional and will bend the rules" to help Mercedes. The writer also said that he would arrive to discuss the trial with Myra McQueen (Nicole Barber-Lane). Daniel Kilkelly from Digital Spy described Jim as a "cunning solicitor" while Metcalfe told Carena Crawford from All About Soap "what a great character he is, he's brilliant – a proper dodgy solicitor and he'll do anything to get her off. He plays a blinder in the court scenes. He's really, really good." She added that Jim concocts a "clever idea" about blaming everything on Riley Costello (Rob Norbury). The actress added that as her character's trial progresses, many different characters arrive to give evidence. Mercedes realises that Jim's "idea is genuinely the best one". Tetsell's management described Jim as an outsider who never fits in. He can appear brash and rude because he has no social skills. But he is actually "a man with a caring heart and the mind of a genius" and "intellectually superior" to others because of his career in law. On 28 January 2014, it was confirmed that Jim would be departing the serial.

Jim arrives to discuss Mercedes' trial with her mother Myra. He tells Myra that he is confident that he can secure her release. He attends court and interrogates Phoebe Jackson (Mandip Gill) and attempts to portray Riley as a liar. Jim portrays Riley as abusive towards Mercedes and suggests that Mercedes had to kidnap her son to protect him from Riley. He also suggests that Dr. Paul Browning (Joseph Thompson) did not kill Lynsey Nolan (Karen Hassan) and that it was Riley who killed her. Mercedes is found not guilty of both charges. Whilst Mercedes is in on trial, he flirts with her sister Carmel Valentine (Gemma Merna). He later helps Carmel to safety after he runs her over with his car. He advises Myra to sue the hospital for giving her an incorrect diagnosis. Jim tells Doctor Browning that he knows is responsible for the diagnosis.

After accidentally punching him, Carmel takes Jim to dinner where he argues with Doctor Browning and Carmel rebuffs Jim's advances. Jim was revealed as Doctor Brownings stalker. Jim recently proposed to Carmel. Carmel reveals her intentions to adopt after she discovers she may be infertile, they visit an adoption clinic and they receive bad news. Jim then overhears Carmel offering a pregnant Chloe (Susan Loughnane) to adopt her child, despite being initially annoyed at Carmel for not telling him that they decide to go ahead with the plan. Jim helps Carmel to arrest her cousin Theresa McQueen (Jorgie Porter) for the murder of Calvin Valentine (Ricky Whittle) so she could have Theresa's daughter Kathleen-Angel McQueen. He was run over and left in a coma by Freddie Roscoe (Charlie Clapham) in January 2014. Fortunately, Jim recovers from his coma, however that joy is short lived. As Carmel finally looks forward to eloping with Jim, Fraser Black (Jesse Birdsall) puts an end to that plan by having him stabbed. Jim then dies in Carmel's arms.

== Billy Parker ==
Billy is the biological father of Leah Barnes (Ela-May Demircan). He made his first appearance on 12 December 2012, with the character being portrayed by Michael Parr. The character's reintroduction was announced on 22 May 2018 with Daniel Jillings taking over the role from 28 May 2018.

== Seamus Brady ==
Seamus Brady
- Hollyoaks character
- Portrayed by: Fintan McKeown
- Duration: 2012–2013
- First appearance: 20 December 2012
- Last appearance: 21 March 2013
- Introduced by: Bryan Kirkwood
In-universe information
- Occupation: Businessman
- Mother: Flo Brady
- Sons: Brendan Brady
- Daughters: Cheryl Brady
- Grandsons: Declan Brady; Padraig Brady
- Granddaughters: Niamh Brady

Seamus Brady, played by Fintan McKeown, made his first screen appearance on 20 December 2012. McKeown's casting was announced on 28 November 2012 and the actor stated "This is my first appearance in soap opera and I hope I can bring something unique to the style and format of the show. I enjoy working with everyone on set, especially my on screen family, Emmett and Bronagh. I can't wait for all the drama that will inevitably ensue."

Seamus is Brendan (Emmett J. Scanlan) and Cheryl Brady's (Bronagh Waugh) father. During the fifth series of Hollyoaks Later, it was revealed that Seamus had sexually abused Brendan when he was a child. A statement from the show explained "Brendan's sister Cheryl is unaware of the very different childhood her sibling had, so could this be an opportunity for the truth to finally surface? Or will there be more wrongs before there can be a right?" Series producer Emma Smithwick said that after the events of Hollyoaks Later "there's no way that I couldn't bring in Brendan's dad!" Smithwick revealed that herself and the production team had "been talking about this man for over a year now, so I'm pretty sure that when Later airs, everyone will want to meet Papa Brady at some point". She said she would like to explore Cheryl and Brendan and what sets them apart through Seamus, as Cheryl "will forgive Brendan almost anything, but what happens when daddy dearest gets in the way?". He departed on 21 March 2013. Seamus is shot dead by his daughter Cheryl after she finds out that he abused Brendan through a video tape left by Simon Walker (Neil Newbon), showing Seamus pleading for forgiveness and apologising.

== Matthew McQueen ==
Matthew McQueen
- Hollyoaks character
- Portrayed by: Malachy and Connor Birchall (2012–2017); Matthew Clohessy (2020–2023)
- Duration: 2012–2017, 2020–2023
- First appearance: Episode 3502; 26 December 2012
- Last appearance: Episode 6228; 23 October 2023
- Introduced by: Bryan Kirkwood
In-universe information
- Other names: Matthew-Jesus McQueen
- Occupation: Student
- Family: McQueen
- Father: John Paul McQueen
- Mother: Chloe
- Adoptive father: Craig Dean
- Stepfather: Ste Hay
- Grandmothers: Myra McQueen; Sally St. Claire
- Uncles: Niall Rafferty
- Aunts: Jacqui McQueen; Mercedes McQueen; Tina Reilly; Carmel McQueen; Michaela McQueen; Carmina McQueen
- First cousins: Phoebe McQueen (adoptive); Bobby Costello; Gabriel McQueen; Max McQueen
- Other relatives: Nana McQueen; Kathleen McQueen; Theresa McQueen; Kathleen-Angel McQueen; Myra-Pocahontas Savage-McQueen; Reenie McQueen; Porsche McQueen; Celine McQueen; Cleo McQueen; Breda McQueen; Sylver McQueen; Cher Winters; Goldie McQueen; Prince McQueen; Hunter McQueen

Matthew-Jesus McQueen, portrayed by Matthew Clohessy, is the son of John Paul McQueen (James Sutton) and Chloe (Susan Loughnane). Matthew makes his debut in episode 3502, originally broadcast on 26 December 2012.

Matthew is abandoned in the McQueens' outdoor Nativity scene and is discovered by Jacqui McQueen (Claire Cooper). When the family decide to call social services, John Paul reveals that he is the baby's father. He explains that he and his ex-boyfriend Craig Dean (Guy Burnet), decided to have a baby together to save their relationship and hired a surrogate Despite initial reservations, and after consultation with his mother Myra McQueen (Nicole Barber-Lane), John Paul embraces his son and names him Matthew Jesús, after the son that Myra gave up, Niall Rafferty (Barry Sloane). The surrogate mother, Chloe, arrives in the village looking for Matthew and begins blackmailing John Paul by claiming Craig is Matthew's biological father. However, a DNA test shows John Paul is Matthew's biological father. Matthew and his father leave the village for Singapore when John Paul gets a new teaching job. They return to the village three years later.

== Other characters ==
Character	Date(s)	Actor	Circumstances
Registrar	24 January 2012	Jo Cowen	A registrar in the hospital while Mercedes McQueen (Jennifer Metcalfe) and Lynsey Nolan (Karen Hassan) are cleaning.
Teacher	26 January 2012	Meriel Schofield	Tilly Evans (Lucy Dixon) gives a biology presentation to her class. The teacher tells Tilly that she made mistakes and marks down her work.
Squatter/Thug	27 January–1 February 2012	Craig Whittaker	George Smith (Steven Roberts) enters his squat to find out that another squatter and his friend have taken over the property. He manages to scare George into leaving the squat. He later tries to stop Callum Kane (Laurie Duncan) from retrieving some of George's possessions.
Tenant	30 January 2012	Danny Ryder	Jacqui McQueen (Claire Cooper) talks to a tenant looking at her advertisement for her spare room. The tenant tells Jacqui that her boyfriend Rhys Ashworth (Andrew Moss) has told him that only females can have the room.
Graham Hardman	31 January–13 March 2012	Steve Marsh	Graham attacks Phoebe Jackson (Mandip Gill), but Deena Hardman (Sian Breckin) manages to scare him away. Graham turns up unannounced at Deena's. She informs him that Phoebe and George Smith (Steven Roberts) will fetch a good price. When Phoebe and George attempt to leave the house he appears and attempts to stop them using force. He then goes in search of George. They are later arrested for their crimes and George and Phoebe escape for good.
Fiona	31 January 2012	Jessica Day	Jacqui McQueen (Claire Cooper) and Rhys Ashworth (Andrew Moss) interview Fiona as a potential new housemate. Fiona ruins her chances when she flirts with Rhys.
Hazel	31 January 2012	Rachel Priest	Jacqui McQueen (Claire Cooper) and Rhys Ashworth (Andrew Moss) interview Hazel as a potential new housemate. She ruins her chances when she reveals that she would like to introduce vermicompost into the flat and gifts Rhys with a bottle of worm waste.
Jen	3 February 2012	Georgina Mellor	Jen is Neil Cooper's (Tosin Cole) driving examiner. At the end of the test she tells him that he has failed.
Annette Palmer	20 February–30 March 2012	Heather Bleasdale	George Smith (Steven Roberts) phones his mother but after she answers he does not speak to her. Annette and her husband Geoff Palmer (Jonty Stephens) think that George killed himself. When Callum Kane (Laurie Duncan) and Maddie Morrison (Scarlett Bowman) visit, she shows them around George's bedroom and she reveals that she thinks he is still alive. Maddie confirms this and George appears outside their home and her family reunites. George later tells his mum that he wants to stay in the village, and she araanges for to stay with the Kanes.
Lecturer	13 March 2012	Kerry Phillips	The lecturer later introduces Tony Hutchinson (Nick Pickard) to give a talk to her business class. She then tells Cheryl Brady (Bronagh Waugh) that she needs to do well in her business pitch or she will be asked to leave the course.
Wardy	15 March–4 May 2012	Karl James Wilson	Wardy is member of the rugby team and friend of Will Savage (James Atherton) and Rob Edwards (David Atkins). He spends time with them drinking in the SU Bar. He later attends another party at the venue alongside Will. Wardy sees Rob's ex-girlfriend Annalise Appleton (Tamaryn Payne) kissing Scott Sabeka (Calvin Denba) and takes a picture of them. He confronts Scott and shows Rob the evidence. He tells Rob that he should not let Scott get away with it. He punches Scott and Rob then punches Wardy for interfering.
Woman	15 March 2012	Rina Mahoney	Phoebe Jackson (Mandip Gill) knocks on the woman's front door and asks her to pretend to be her mother. After George Smith (Steven Roberts) think Phoebe has reunited with her parent, the woman tells Phoebe that she still owes her.
Geoff Palmer	16 March 2012	Jonty Stephens	Geoff is the father of George Smith (Steven Roberts) and he and his wife Annette (Heather Bleasdale) believe that their son killed himself. He gets angry when Callum Kane (Laurie Duncan) and Maddie Morrison (Scarlett Bowman) arrive at his home. He throws them out when they claim that George is still alive, but is shocked to find George standing outside.
Neesha	22–23 March 2012	Kiran Landa	Neesha is an old colleague of Dennis Savage (Joe Tracini) from the phone shop. She visits him to see how he is doing and tells him he can do better than working in the SU Bar. Dennis then asks Neesha out on a date.
StooShe	26 March 2012	As themselves	StooShe are a real-world girl group who perform in the SU Bar while the student party.
Bank manager	3 April 2012	James Nickerson	Ste Hay (Kieron Richardson) and Doug Carter (PJ Brennan) attend an appointment to discuss a loan for the purchase of Cinerity. Ste imagines the bank manager and himself naked; which causes him to make a bad impression. The bank manager then refuses to give them a loan.
Journalist	9 April 2012	Ross Adams	A journalist and online blogger visits Mitzeee (Rachel Shenton) to interview her. He tells her that he is only there because his company is now in association with her management.
Dave	9–10 April 2012	Michael Camp	Joel Dexter (Andrew Still) is sent to retrieve money from Dave that he owes Brendan Brady (Emmett J. Scanlan). Dave tells Joel that he wants to know everything about Brendan because he conned him. Joel tells him to hand over the money, but Dave calls in a group of his friends to surround Joel. After beating Joel up, Brendan goes to see Dave with money and it becomes clear that he was acting under Brendan's orders.
Mags	10–13 April 2012	Barbara Young	Mags is the grandmother of Scott Sabeka (Calvin Denba). He goes to stay with her over the Easter holidays and Barney Harper-McBride (Tom Scurr) also visits. She punches Barney when she thinks he is stealing from her. Mags tells Scott that he needs to go out and stop hiding from his old friend Mitchell. She says he should fight Mitchell; he does so and Scott and Mitchell make up. Mags later dies just before leaving to see the fight.
Mitchell	10–13 April 2012	Jack Bence	Mitchell is an old friend of Scott Sabeka (Calvin Denba) and when they see each other, Mitchell tries to argue with him. Scott tells Barney Harper-McBride (Tom Scurr) that Mitchell wanted to steal laptops with his help. As Scott wanted to go to University he backed out, while Mitchell was sent to prison; ruining their friendship.
Mr Keeler	17 April 2012 – 29 January 2013	Carl Cieka	Mr Keeler works at Hollyoaks Sixth Form College. He evacuates the school during a fire and asks George Smith (Steven Roberts) if Phoebe Jackson (Mandip Gill) lit it. He later checks up on injured pupil Tilly Evans (Lucy Dixon) and nearly catches her kissing her teacher Jen Gilmore (Amy Downham). Mr Keeler later watches a debate organised by Jen. He reprimands Phoebe and Maddie Morrison (Scarlett Bowman) for fighting and calls their legal guardians in for a meeting. Mr Keeler is later fired after failing to sort out the bullying problem at the college, which led to Esther Bloom (Jazmine Franks) attempting suicide.
Mary	2 May 2012	Connie Walker	Mary is Mitzeee's (Rachel Shenton) is present at the taping of "Style like the Stars", which Mitzeee is appearing on. Esther Bloom (Jazmine Franks) tells Mary about Mitzeee's favourite drink; which Mitzeee had never made public. Mitzeee is being stalked and when Mary mentions the drink live on air, Mitzeee angrily accuses her of being the stalker.
Horace	2 May 2012	Michael Howe	Horace is the presenter of "Style like the Stars" and helps Mitzeee (Rachel Shenton) prepare for her interview. Mitzeee starts an argument with her super fan Mary, accusing her of being a stalker. Horace tells Mitzeee that she will never get a job on television again.
Policeman	3 May 2012	Ross Grant	Mitzeee (Rachel Shenton) informs the policeman that she is being stalked. He tells her that they will monitor the situation, but cannot do much more. Mitzeee accuses him of being unhelpful and leaves.
Adam	4–11 May 2012	Alex Morgan	Ste Hay (Kieron Richardson) joins a dating website where he meets Adam. They arrange a date in the SU Bar, but Ste's business partner Doug Carter (PJ Brennan) joins them. Adam presumes that Doug is interested in Ste, but he tells him that he is straight. Adam then arranges another date with Ste. Adam realises that Ste is more preoccupied and decides to stop seeing him. He later tells Doug that it is his fault they split.
Head of Year	7–8 May 2012	Sarah Groarke	Jacqui McQueen (Claire Cooper) and Phoebe Jackson (Mandip Gill) visit the Head of Year about the possibility of Phoebe joining her school. She tells them that she does not think Phoebe is suitable; which causes Jacqui to start an argument at her. Jacqui returns to make amends and she offers Phoebe a place at the Sixth Form College instead.
Promoter	7 May 2012	Danny Hynes	Mitzeee (Rachel Shenton) arrives at a promotional event at a night club. The club's promoter introduces Mitzeee and convinces her to stay for drinks in the VIP lounge.
Jamie	7 May 2012	Paddy Wallace	Jamie meets Mercedes McQueen (Jennifer Metcalfe) in a night club and he buys her drinks. She pretends to be Mitzeee (Rachel Shenton) and invites him back for sex. However, she tells Jamie to wait a while before turning up and gives him Mitzeee's address. Jamie arrives and Riley Costello (Rob Norbury) questions him about how he knows Mitzeee, who is away attending a promotional appearance. Riley warns him to keep away and Jamie leaves.
Casper	16–17 May, 29 June 2012	Chris Lindon	Casper and Sampson are involved in a dealings with Simon Walker (Neil Newbon), but he backs out of the arrangement. Walker's contact Brendan Brady (Emmett J. Scanlan) shows interest in the deal and sends his accomplice Joel Dexter (Andrew Still) to the meeting place. Joel arrives to a hostile welcome and is stabbed in the process when he attempts to escape. Brendan decides to get revenge and attacks Casper and Sampson.
Sampson	16 May–29 June 2012	Sean Cernow	Sampson and Casper are involved in a business deal with Brendan Brady (Emmett J. Scanlan) and Simon Walker (Neil Newbon). Brendan sends accomplice Joel Dexter (Andrew Still) who is stabbed. In revenge Brendan attacks Casper and Sampson. Brendan's friend, Lynsey Nolan (Karen Hassan) is killed in a whodunit storyline. Digital Spy reported that Samspon had motive to kill her due to him trying to settle a score with Brendan. A promotional image featuring Samspon later confirmed him as a suspect in the mystery.
Mr Sykes	21–25 May 2012	Mark Jordon	Mr Sykes advises Callum Kane (Laurie Duncan) about his choice of university. When he next offers his advice, Callum gets angry and mocks his job.
Policeman	21–23 May 2012	Luke Broughton	The policeman arrives at the McQueen's home with a warrant to search the premises. He helps arrest the entire family for possession of a cannabis farm. He later visits Diane O'Connor's (Alex Fletcher) house to search for Bart McQueen (Jonny Clarke).
Daz	23 May 2012	Samuel Thompson	Daz goes to see Bart McQueen (Jonny Clarke) after he requests his help. Bart steals the Savage family campervan and sells it to Daz.
Delivery guy	5 June 2012	Richard Kelly	The delivery man arrives at Chez Chez with stock. Brendan Brady (Emmett J. Scanlan) tells him that the order is wrong and he is forced to take it back.
Waiter	6 June 2012	Ryan Cerenko	A waiter serves Brendan Brady (Emmett J. Scanlan) and Ste Hay (Kieron Richardson). Ste then asks the waiter if Brendan has booked a room for the night.
My First Tooth	7 June 2012	As themselves	My First Tooth, Nine Nails and Pariis Opera House are bands that perform at Will Savage's (James Atherton) music festival in the village.
Nine Nails	7 June 2012	As themselves	My First Tooth, Nine Nails and Pariis Opera House are bands that perform at Will Savage's (James Atherton) music festival in the village.
Pariis Opera House	8 June 2012	As themselves	My First Tooth, Nine Nails and Pariis Opera House are bands that perform at Will Savage's (James Atherton) music festival in the village.
Band manager	8 June 2012	Matthew John Morley	Dodger Savage (Danny Mac) tries to convince the band manager to lend his music equipment. He tells Dodger he needs to get his band to a gig that actually pays good money. Dodger pays him with his takings from game stand.
Solicitor	8 June 2012	Steve Murphy	Ste Hay (Kieron Richardson) tells Brendan Brady (Emmett J. Scanlan) that if he wants them to be in a relationship, then he has to sign their business Carter-Hay into his name. Brendan and Ste see the solicitor who oversees the signing of paperwork.
Maverick Sabre	8 June 2012	As himself	Maverick Sabre's originally appeared in one-off episode exclusive to E4 on 7 June 2012. He appears in the main series at after Dennis Savage (Joe Tracini) convinces him to perform at Will Savage's (James Atherton) music festival. His band consisting of Chantelle Nandi, Charlie Laffer, Joe Price, Tricky O'Connor, Samson Jatto perform alongside him.
Maverick's band	8 June 2012	As themselves	Maverick Sabre's originally appeared in one-off episode exclusive to E4 on 7 June 2012. He appears in the main series at after Dennis Savage (Joe Tracini) convinces him to perform at Will Savage's (James Atherton) music festival. His band consisting of Chantelle Nandi, Charlie Laffer, Joe Price, Tricky O'Connor, Samson Jatto perform alongside him.
Judge Barrett	28 June 2012, 28 March 2017	Roberta Kerr	The judge who presided over Mitzeee's (Rachel Shenton) bail hearing, as she stood charged with the attempted murder of Mercedes McQueen (Jennifer Metcalfe) in June 2012. Judge Barrett decided to refuse bail, and insisted that Mitzeee would be remanded in custody until her trial. In March 2017, the judge grants Amy Barnes (Ashley Slanina-Davies) and Ryan Knight (Duncan James) permission to take Leah Barnes (Elà-May Demircan) and Lucas Hay (William Hall) to America, after their father, Ste Hay (Kieron Richardson) objects.
Journalist	4 July–3 August 2012	Sam Pamphilon	Darren Osborne (Ashley Taylor Dawson) serves a journalist a drink and he questions him about Riley Costello (Rob Norbury) and Mitzeee's (Rachel Shenton) relationship. Darren does not realise he is a journalist and gives him information. his name is later revealed as Patrick Salter when he gives his card to Will Savage (James Atherton) in hope of getting information on serial killer Silas Blissett (Jeff Rawle), Will however declines.
Elizabeth Morrison	13 July–11 December 2012	Helen Grace	Elizabeth is the mother of Maddie Morrison (Scarlett Bowman) and wife of Ed Morrison (Dominic Rickhards). Maddie is devastated when Elizabeth reveals that her and Ed are filing for divorce, when an argument breaks-out between the couple, Maddie is enraged and takes herself and her friends on a trip to Aborsoch. When Maddie and Phoebe Jackson (Mandip Gill) get into trouble at school, Mr Keeler (Carl Cieka) calls Elizabeth and Rhys Ashworth (Andrew Moss) into his office. Elizabeth and Rhys go for a coffee after the meeting and she propositions him with sex but he walks away. She makes her final appearance at Maddie's memorial service in the college.
Jamie	17–19 July 2012	Will Rastall	Jamie meets Maddie Morrison (Scarlett Bowman) in Abersoch and she reveals that he is a friend of her ex-boyfriend Toby (Alex Roe). When Neil Cooper (Tosin Cole) steals his surfboard, Jamie and his friends chase him and tie him up for revenge. He takes Maddie to a party and she flirts with him. When he tries to kiss her, she rebuffs him and he becomes annoyed that she went to his party and drank his alcohol but will not kiss him. He grabs Maddie and forces himself on her.
Katie	17–19 July 2012	Jemma Dallender	Katie meets Neil Cooper (Tosin Cole) on a beach at Abersoch. She asks him for surfing lessons, but he does not turn up. She attends a part he is at and she he tells her why he did not show.
Father Des	19 July 2012 – 28 March 2013	Patrick Miller	Father Des is a vicar who offers advice to Carmel Valentine (Gemma Merna) after she is left with facial scarring. He later gives support to Brendan Brady (Emmett J. Scanlan) when he is in need. He later visits to the McQueen family to baptise Matthew-Jesus McQueen, but it is cancelled.
Barrister	20 July 2012	Clarence Smith	Will Savage's (James Atherton) Barrister visits him to inform him that the police are still proceeding with Will's murder charge.
Grace	20–21 July 2012	Amy Noble	Grace is a woman that Will Savage (James Atherton) admits to talking to online and secretly filming after he was encouraged to do so by Silas Blissett (Jeff Rawle).
Connie Carter	9 August–10 September 2012, 4 November 2013	Julia Montgomery-Brown	Connie and Herb are Doug Carter's parents, who come to visit him. They presumed that Doug is in a relationship with Leanne Holiday (Jessica Forrest) and he does not correct them. Doug is afraid to tell Connie and Herb that he is involved with a man, Ste Hay (Kieron Richardson). Leanne escalates the lie by letting them think that she is pregnant and also engaged to Doug. When he attempts to tell them the truth, they mention the wedding fund that Doug is due upon his marriage. Ste convinces Doug to keep lying to Connie and Herb so he receives the money.
Herb Carter	9 August–10 September 2012	Todd Boyce	
Police Officer	14 August 2012	David Clayton	Brendan Brady (Emmett J. Scanlan) and Simon Walker (Neil Newbon) are involved in a factory siege. A policeman chases them through the factory and Walker shoots him. In the episode a series of flashbacks occur to when Brendan and Walker met in prison. Present is the Prison Officer and Kai who runs the drug operations in the prison. Kai tries to attack Brendan but Walker saves him.
Kai	14 August 2012	Liam Smith	Brendan Brady (Emmett J. Scanlan) and Simon Walker (Neil Newbon) are involved in a factory siege. A policeman chases them through the factory and Walker shoots him. In the episode a series of flashbacks occur to when Brendan and Walker met in prison. Present is the Prison Officer and Kai who runs the drug operations in the prison. Kai tries to attack Brendan but Walker saves him.
Prison Officer	14 August 2012	Archie Kelly	Brendan Brady (Emmett J. Scanlan) and Simon Walker (Neil Newbon) are involved in a factory siege. A policeman chases them through the factory and Walker shoots him. In the episode a series of flashbacks occur to when Brendan and Walker met in prison. Present is the Prison Officer and Kai who runs the drug operations in the prison. Kai tries to attack Brendan but Walker saves him.
Shawnee	14 August–13 November 2012	Josie Taylor	Shawnee is heading an operation in which Simon Walker (Neil Newbon) is attempting to uncover Brendan Brady's (Emmett J. Scanlan) crimes. She tells Walker off for shooting a police officer to keep the investigation going. She warns him off the case aghain but he tells her he can secure Brendan's arrest. He leads Shawnee to the body of Mick (Gavin Marshall) but when she arrives Brendan has already disposed of the body. She tells Walker that he is off the case. When she warns Walker off again he attacks Shawnee and throws her out of his car. Shawnee is later seen convincing Doug Carter (PJ Brennan) to help bring Brendan down. He says that he is scared but she warns him about his own past involvement in Brendan's crimes.
Cam	14 August–14 September 2012	Sam Hagen	Cam is Simon Walker's (Neil Newbon) brother who is hospitalised in a persistent vegetative state. Walker reveals that Brendan Brady (Emmett J. Scanlan) was responsible for supplying him with the drugs which caused his condition and vows to get revenge for him. Later a Doctor (Alison Darling) informs Walker that Cam has an infection and his condition is deteriorating. Walker enquires about alternative treatments but the Doctor tells him that Cam is in pain. Cam later dies from his illness.
Police Officer	22 August 2012	Ian Ralph	The police officer arrests Tilly Evans (Lucy Dixon) when she steals Jen Gilmore's (Amy Downham) car. Her disappointed father, Kevin Evans arrives to collect her from the police station. Kevin questions Jen for answers about Tilly's behaviour.
Kevin Evans	22 August 2012	William Ilkley	The police officer arrests Tilly Evans (Lucy Dixon) when she steals Jen Gilmore's (Amy Downham) car. Her disappointed father, Kevin Evans arrives to collect her from the police station. Kevin questions Jen for answers about Tilly's behaviour.
Mick Cornus	12 September 2012	Gavin Marshall	Mick is Joel Dexter's (Andrew Still) stepfather and arrives to convince his abused partner Marie Fielding (Emma Campbell Jones) to return home with him. When she agrees, Joel is upset. Mick later hits Joel, so Brendan kidnaps him and drives him to Southport. Mick escapes and attacks Joel with a hammer before kidnapping and attacking Joel's girlfriend, Theresa McQueen (Jorgie Porter). Joel and Brendan hang Mick off a lighthouse and make him beg for his life. They decide to give Mick a chance, but he slips off the lighthouse during a fight. They presume he is dead and put his body in the boot. Simon Walker (Neil Newbon) discovers that he is alive and suffocates him with plastic to frame Brendan. Brendan, still believing himself to be the killer, then cuts up Mick's corpse.
