= Chloe (Hollyoaks) =

UK soap opera character (created 2013)

- Hollyoaks character
- Portrayed by: Susan Loughnane
- Duration: 2013–2014
- First appearance: 12 August 2013
- Last appearance: 3 January 2014
- Introduced by: Bryan Kirkwood
In-universe information
- Sons: Matthew McQueen

Chloe is a fictional character from the British soap opera Hollyoaks, played by Susan Loughnane. The character made her first on-screen appearance on 12 August 2013. Loughnane had to audition for the role. Initially appearing in a small number of episodes, Loughnane returned to film new storylines. Chloe is introduced into the show as the mother of Matthew McQueen. The character has earned a reputation as a "serial surrogate mother" from selling her babies. Chloe sold Matthew to John Paul McQueen (James Sutton) and Craig Dean (Guy Burnet). While on-screen she agrees to sell another baby to Sienna Blake (Anna Passey) and later Carmel McQueen (Gemma Merna). Chloe has featured in a same sex kiss with Tilly Evans (Lucy Dixon). Loughnane made her final appearance as Chloe during the episode broadcast on 3 January 2014.

Chloe's behaviour has been the focus of critics. The Evening Herald's Eimear Rabbitte viewed Chloe as a troublemaker. Laura Morgan from Inside Soap said that she was a "crafty" female. Daniel Kilkelly from Digital Spy believed she has "history of erratic behaviour".

== Casting ==
Irish actress Loughnane had to audition for part of Chloe. Later she had a chance meeting with fellow Irish and Hollyoaks actor Emmett J. Scanlan. Upon being chosen to play the role Loughnane remembered that she forgot to mention the Hollyoaks audition to Scanlan.

== Development ==
Daniel Kilkelly from Digital Spy announced details of the character on 6 August 2013. He revealed that Chloe arrives in Hollyoaks to visit her son Matthew McQueen. She acted as a surrogate mother so John Paul McQueen (James Sutton) and Craig Dean (Guy Burnet) could begin a family. She pretends to want to visit Matthew, then reveals that she needs £5000. When John Paul refuses she threatens to take Matthew away claiming that Craig is the father. Sutton told Kilkelly that he enjoyed filming with Loughnane and they had fun working on the storyline. He detailed how Chloe and John Paul had become best friends while living in Ireland. They share a lot of history and he has previously been there to bail her out of money troubles. Chloe's first scenes were broadcast on 12 August 2013.

On 10 August 2013, Loughnane announced that she had returned to filming at Hollyoaks until November 2013. She explained to Eimear Rabbitte from the Evening Herald that "I filmed for the month of June and then I had a break and now I'm back for the next few months." Loughnane described Chloe as a fun character and challenging to play. Kilkelly reported that Chloe would return pregnant and planning to sell her baby. When Sienna Blake (Anna Passey) learns of her intentions she offers Chloe double the price for her unborn baby. Chloe realises that Sienna is covering up a fake pregnancy to deceive Darren Osborne (Ashley Taylor Dawson) and blackmails her as a means to solve her financial problems.

Loughnane David Hennessy from the Irish World that Chloe's treatment of Sienna would make viewers like her. She added that "Chloe discovers that Sienna’s not really pregnant. She just starts to manipulate her and blackmail her and while that would be a horrible thing to do if it was to a nice character, because it’s Sienna, it’s great. It’s like evil meets evil and I think that’s kind of nice, Sienna’s met her match a little bit." Chloe reconsiders and offers to sell her baby to Sienna. But Chloe changes her mind for selfish reasons. Passey told Sarah Ellis from Inside Soap that "something went wrong with the family who were going to have Chloe's baby, so she offers it to Sienna instead." The actress added that Chloe's offer is a "godsend" and makes Sienna believe her deceitful plans are justified because she and Darren will now have a child.

In November 2013, Loughnane announced that she would continue to appear onscreen into January 2014. On 3 December 2013, Kilkelly reported that Chloe would become part of a new storyline causing trouble for Tilly Evans (Lucy Dixon) and Esther Bloom's (Jazmine Franks) relationship. Tilly believes that Chloe is trying to steal Esther from her. Chloe begins a protest to free illegal immigrant Vincent Elegba (John Omole) and subsequently be arrested. The stunt leaves Tilly unimpressed and sparks an argument resulting in Chloe kissing Tilly. Dixon has stated that Chloe is a "crazy girl who came out of nowhere". Tilly views her outlook on life as being different and reminds herself of how she used to be. Dixon concluded that Tilly views "Chloe as a way of getting back to the old Tilly."

December saw the culmination of the Chloe's involvement in Sienna's storyline. When Chloe is rushed into hospital after losing consciousness, Sienna begins to panic. Passey told Carena Crawford from All About Soap that Chloe's hospitalisation is "life and death" for Sienna - "she's decided now: this baby is hers, and nothing can go wrong." Passey also admitted that Sienna does not believe Chloe's plan will work. She just deludes herself because she wants Chloe's baby to solve her problems. But Sienna's lies are exposed leaving Chloe without a recipient. Kilkelly later reported that Carmel Valentine (Gemma Merna) would be the next character to offering to adopt the baby. Carmel discovers that she may not be able to have children and sees Chloe's predicament as the solution to her problem. However, her boyfriend Jim McGinn (Dan Tetsell) is unhappy. Despite his disapproval Carmel plans to purchase Chloe's unborn baby. But she soon tires of Carmel and opts to spend time with Tilly instead. Carmel is also arrested in her attempts to raise the money to pay Chloe. Laura Morgan from All About Soap reported that Chloe will plan to steal Carmel's money and leave Hollyoaks. Her final scenes occurred during the episode broadcast on 3 January 2014.

== Storylines ==
Chloe arrives in the village and quickly befriends Theresa McQueen (Jorgie Porter). However, when she meets John Paul McQueen (James Sutton), she is soon revealed to be Matthew's mother and claims to want to visit her son. He agrees, but she reveals that she is £5000 in debt and needs to raise the money. When John Paul refuses to help, she announces that she will take Matthew away if he does not pay up. He agrees and begins to attempt to find the money. John Paul discovers that he is actually Matthew's father instead of his former boyfriend Craig (Guy Burnet) and he confronts Chloe. She apologises for lying and admits she just needed the money and leaves.

Chloe soon returns to the village requesting an additional loan from John Paul, and reveals that she is acting as a surrogate mother for another couple. Sienna Blake (Anna Passey) overhears the conversation and befriends Chloe. She later asks Chloe to sell the baby to her, but Chloe realises that Sienna is lying about her pregnancy and blackmails her into giving her money in exchange for her silence. When Chloe returns she is accused of stealing the funds raised by the Osbornes to help to search for missing Tom Cunningham (Ellis Hollins). She moves into the student house with Tilly Evans (Lucy Dixon), who believes Chloe is attracted to her girlfriend Esther. She annoys her housemates by eating all their food and messing up the kitchen cupboards. Chloe stages a protest to free Vincent, and Tilly believes she is trying to impress Ether. Tilly confronts Chloe, who then confesses her attraction to Tilly, resulting in a kiss. Chloe faints and is rushed to hospital where she and Tilly kiss again, only for Sienna to walk in on them. Chloe momentarily considers keeping the baby but tells Sienna she can still have the baby. Tilly discovers the truth about the baby lie and tries to stop it, but Sienna is soon exposed and Chloe is left with the task of finding new parents for her unborn child.

When Esther discovers the kiss, Chloe pretends that she instigated it. Tilly agrees to let Chloe continue living with her. Carmel Valentine (Gemma Merna) later approaches Chloe with the idea of buying her baby. She agrees but changes her mind when she witnesses a fiery argument in the McQueen household. Tilly causes an argument with Esther on New Year's Eve so she can spend it with Chloe. They kiss but Tilly feels guilty and cannot leave Esther. Chloe decides to leave the village but Carmel attempts to convince her to be her surrogate again. Chloe demands a cash payment and plans to run away with the cash. But Esther realises that Tilly loves Chloe and convinces her to leave with her. Tilly manages to catch Chloe and they leave together.

== Reception ==
The Evening Herald's Rabbitte described Chloe as a "fun-loving", young Irish mother who creates trouble on her arrival. Laura Morgan from All About Soap had branded Chloe a "crafty" type of character. A RTÉ.ie reporter opined that Chloe returned to Hollyoaks in October as a "vulnerable girl". Digital Spy's Kilkelly said that "mischievous Chloe" was "not one to be easily fooled" and that blackmail is part of her "true colours". He also viewed Chloe and Tilly's kiss as a surprise moment. He later said that Chloe created a "history of erratic behaviour" during her tenure. A writer from SoapSquawk branded Chloe a "fiery" female.

Viewing an unconcerned Chloe being arrested while pregnant left one writer from Virgin Media questioning "what on earth is she playing at?" Carena Crawford from Reveal magazine chose Chloe being rushed into hospital as a soap highlight of the day. Rebecca Bowden writing for Yahoo! was delighted that Chloe "effortlessly" got the upper hand over Sienna and congratulated her in her article. When Chloe offers to sell Sienna her baby questioned whether the storyline could become any crazier and drawn out. She later commented that Tilly was "clearly gobsmacked by how low Sienna and Chloe will sink in order to protect themselves". Anthony D. Langford of TheBacklot.com said that Chloe blackmailing John Paul with the threat of legal action was a "dumb" storyline. He noted that she had no money to pay for legal fees leaving John Paul free to ignore her demands. Hennessy branded Chloe a "serial surrogate mother" whose presence caused an "explosive impact".
