= Dean Smith (actor) =

English actor and comedian

- Born: Dean Howard Smith; 25 January 1990 (age 36); Leeds, England
- Occupations: Actor; comedian; podcaster

Dean Howard Smith (born 25 January 1990) is an actor and comedian from Leeds, England. He is best known for playing Philip Ryan in the BBC One Drama Waterloo Road. He also played Vinnie Dupe, the geek without chic, in STV's comedy Being Victor, and William, in BBC1's Last Tango in Halifax. Most recently Smith revisited the role of Philip Ryan in the BBC online Drama Waterloo Road Reunited. This series followed seven ex-pupils on life after Waterloo Road.

In 2019, Smith took on the role of DS Yates in Hollyoaks, becoming a corrupt copper on local gangster Liam Donovans payroll. Also in 2019 he starred as Willis in the BBC 1 sitcom Still Open All Hours.

Smith takes part in charity events including charity football matches.

In 2011, Smith and fellow Waterloo Road cast members Jack McMullen, Ben-Ryan Davies, Will Ash and actor Tom Gibbons took on the National Three Peaks Challenge.

Smith is patron of 'Once Upon a Smile' charity and takes part in many of their charity football matches.

Smith completed the Great Yorkshire Run in 2011 running for Cancer Research UK.

Smith joined The Square Ball Podcast, which discusses the football club Leeds United, among other topics, in April 2024, as a co-host.

== Filmography ==
Year	Title	Role	Notes
2009	Awaydays	Rugger Bugger 2	Film
2009	Cotton Stone	Ian	Short
2009	Casualty	Tim	TV series
2010	The Founding	Unicorn Boy	Short
2009–2011	Waterloo Road	Philip Ryan	TV series
2010	Doctors	Spanner	One episode of TV series
2010	Being Victor	Vinnie Dupe	TV & Online series
2011	Waterloo Road Reunited	Philip Ryan	Online
2013	The Great Train Robbery	David Whitby	TV series
2014	Common	Hugo Davies	TV movie
2014	The Village	PC Derbyshire	1 episode
2015–2020	Last Tango in Halifax	William	8 episodes
2017	The Last Kingdom	Thief	1 episode
2018–2019	Hollyoaks	DS Yates	26 episodes
2019	Still Open All Hours	Willis	Series 6 Regular
2019	Coronation Street	Andy Wingfield	3 episodes
2022	Emmerdale	Prison Officer Beeker	Guest role

== Theatre credits ==
Year	Title	Role	Notes
2025	Through It All Together	Multiple roles	Leeds Playhouse
