= Vincent Elegba =

UK soap opera character, created 2013

- Hollyoaks character
- Portrayed by: John Omole
- Duration: 2013–2014
- First appearance: 16 April 2013
- Last appearance: 18 September 2014
- Introduced by: Bryan Kirkwood
In-universe information
- Occupation: Barista (2013)

Vincent Elegba is a fictional character from the British Channel 4 soap opera Hollyoaks, played by John Omole. The character made his first screen appearance on 16 April 2013. Vincent is an illegal immigrant from Nigeria. He left the country to seek refuge fearing persecution because he is gay. The storyline has been described as an original by those involved. The show worked closely with LGBT charity Stonewall to portray the issue. His main scene partners have been Phoebe McQueen (Mandip Gill) and George Smith (Steven Roberts). His friendship with Phoebe explored unrequited love as she pursued a relationship while Vincent fell in love with George. His subsequent detaining by immigration officials found him placed on remand and becoming the victim of homophobic violence. The character has proved unpopular with critic Anthony D. Langford from TheBacklot.com who has often deemed his relationship with George implausible. The character departed the show on 18 February 2014 but returned for 2 episodes on 17 September 2014.

== Casting ==
Omole's casting was announced on 5 February 2013 via his management's website. The actor initially signed a six-month contract with Hollyoaks. Vincent was then reported to be from Uganda. Omole's agent informed him that Vincent would be gay prior to auditioning. He recalls the Hollyoaks audition process as being a "fantastic" one.

== Character development ==
=== Characterisation ===
Vincent is your go-to guy if you need a bit of compassion, cheering up, or, you know, the Heimlich manoeuvre. He's kind, honest and, basically, an all round stand-up guy.

— Channel4.com on Vincent.

Vincent is from Nigeria and he seeks refuge illegally in the United Kingdom. Omole has described Vincent as a "nice guy" who would never intentionally hurt people. He has a "hero complex" where he feels obliged to help those close to him. Omole told Daniel Kilkelly of Digital Spy that Vincent has a "sweetness of him [that] is attractive" to viewers. Vincent has a Nigerian accent but Omole is from London. As his parents originate from the country, Omole can project a thick Nigerian accent. But he did tone the accent down knowing that a broad audience watch Hollyoaks. But Omole felt that he struggled to find the right level of projection.

=== Friendship with Phoebe Jackson ===
One of the character's main friendships is shared with Phoebe Jackson (Mandip Gill). A continued theme of Vincent needing Phoebe's friendship has been developed. The storyline written meant that he could not trust anyone. The duo have been used to portray homelessness and Omole believed it was an experience used to form their friendship. Vincent arrives alongside four other illegal immigrants who are discovered hiding by Jacqui McQueen (Claire Cooper) and Phoebe in a scam arrange by Trevor Royle (Greg Wood) . Daniel Kilkelly from Digital Spy later announced that the character was a possible love interest for Phoebe. He added that Phoebe would be impressed with Vincent when he administers first aid on Maxine Minniver (Nikki Sanderson) after she collapses in Chez Chez.

Gill told Kilkelly that Phoebe does not expect to see Vincent again after she set him free. She explained that Vincent and Phoebe have "a lot of things in common and I think there's instant chemistry there". Phoebe does not know Vincent well but there are signs that they are compatible. She is impressed with Vincent taking control when Maxine collapses and wonders if he could reside in the village. But Vincent worries about getting Phoebe into trouble and is loath to embroil her in his staying in the United Kingdom illegally. Though Gill revealed the formation of a "really nice friendship" and that Omole had become her frequent scene partner. Gill also teased another aspect of Vincent's story. Phoebe had long been friends with George Smith (Steven Roberts) and Vincent's presence causes problems. She was excited to explore how Vincent would continue to affect the Phoebe/George friendship. Phoebe obtains a counterfeit passport from Trevor but it results in her being kidnapped. Gill told an All About Soap reporter that Phoebe is unaware of the danger. Trevor holds Vincent prisoner and threatens to murder him unless she leads him to Jacqui. The McQueen family con Trevor and Vincent is released.

=== Sexuality ===
"Where Vincent is from, he could be sent to prison for his sexuality, or people in his local village or town could even kill him. So Vincent isn't just running for his freedom, he's running for his life. It's very, very important that he finds a way to stay in the country."

— Omole on Vincent's background

Vincent is homosexual and this is first addressed on-screen during June 2013. His first love interest is George who kisses resulting in Vincent's admission. Vincent's backstory has been detailed within the show and during promotional interviews. Homosexuality in illegal in Nigeria and ispunishable with prison sentences totaling fourteen years. Omole revealed that Vincent's family did not accept him. They urged him to seek refuge in the United Kingdom for his and their safety. Vincent perceives his sexuality to be an illness. Omole worked closely with the Hollyoaks research department and LGBT charity Stonewall to correctly portray the issue. He learned a lot about the consequences of homosexuality in Nigeria and branded it a taboo subject. He felt that it was an original, unique coming out story that was important for Hollyoaks to portray. Omole stated Vincent needed to face his fears instead of continuous avoidance. In July 2012, Executive producer Bryan Kirkwood told Kilkelly that Vincent's storyline with George and Phoebe would become a prominent one. He praised the storyline for being "quite unique" and called in an "important issue story". He added that a Nigerian asylum seeker escaping persecution for being gay is a first in the soap opera genre.

As Omole has stated, George is the first male Vincent becomes attracted to. This leaves the character unsure because is the early process of accepting his sexuality. Developing feelings for a man only proves more difficult for Vincent to accept. The actor told Kilkelly that Vincent feels guilty about Phoebe and is worried about destroying her rapport with George. He concluded that the story was about not being able to help who you love. Two people with "warm hearts" acting without intent to heart Phoebe. Gill has branded it a "sticky love triangle". She added that filming the story had scenes of tears, laughter and "bitching".

On 20 September 2013, it was announced that Hollyoaks would film "an exciting new storyline" in Derry. It was soon revealed that the storyline sees Vincent and Phoebe travel to the city to marry. While George, Tilly Evans (Lucy Dixon) and Esther Bloom (Jazmine Franks) also feature. Vincent has led Phoebe to think that he wants to marry her. Gill has stated that Phoebe acts naive in scenes building up to the ceremony. Vincent is unwilling to have sex and Phoebe assumes he is not ready. She also ignored the fact she witnessed Vincent kissing George. Gill told Kilkelly that "she wanted the relationship so badly and Vincent told her it was a mistake, she almost turned a blind eye to it." But the wedding is unsuccessful as George manages to prevent it by convincing Vincent to be honest. The storyline culminates in Vincent detained by immigration officials. He is subjected to homophobic abuse from fellow inmates. Solicitor Jim McGinn (Dan Tetsell) urges him to be honest about his sexuality to remain in the country.

=== Departure and return ===
On 17 February 2014, it was confirmed that Omole had left his role as Vincent. Of his exit, the actor said "I've had an amazing time at Hollyoaks and off screen at Lime Pictures. Everyone has treated me so well and the cast have been a dream to work with and be around." Omole also said that he would "cherish" Vincent's story because of its importance. The character's last scenes saw him move to London for a new job, following the conclusion of his storyline with George.

On 9 September 2014, Sophie Dainty writing for Digital Spy revealed that the character would return. She revealed that Vincent would return in an attempt to win George back. But his efforts are hindered by George's long-time love rival Phoebe.

== Storylines ==
Vincent hides in a van with fellow illegal immigrants in a job organised by Trevor. Jacqui and Phoebe discover them. She decides to let them flee the scene. Phoebe later finds Vincent in the village and they catch up. He goes to rave at the local night club but Maxine collapses after having her drink spiked. Vincent helps to put her in the recovery position and impresses Phoebe. George becomes jealous and makes Vincent feel unwelcome. Vincent tells Phoebe that he wants to raise money for train fare to start a new life in Newcastle, but she appears to not want him to leave. Vincent manages to secure a job at College Coffee in exchange for cash in hand. Phoebe attempts to kiss Vincent but he rebuffs her advances. George threatens to report Vincent following the discovery he is in the United Kingdom illegally. The pair argue and George kisses Vincent who responds. Vincent reveals that he is gay and left Nigeria to escape persecution and honor his family. George agrees to keep it a secret but warns him to be honest with Phoebe. Trevor later captures Vincent and blackmails the McQueen family, but Phoebe secures his safe release.

Phoebe believes that Vincent is attracted to her. George tells Vincent to be honest but he continues to lie. Vincent and George remain friends and later kiss, but this is witnessed by Phoebe. She refuses to forgive either of them. But Vincent decides to deny his sexuality and attends a religious group claiming to cure homosexuals. Despite other people's concerns, Phoebe encourages him. He decides to attend the group's getaway and ignores George's pleas for him to come out as gay. Upon his return Vincent claims to be heterosexual and pursues Phoebe. He asks her to marry him but when she is refused permission they elope to Northern Ireland to gain permission from Phoebe's mother Mel (Emma Rydal). George follows them and stops the wedding. Vincent admits that he is gay and kisses George and Phoebe retaliates by reporting him to immigration officials. She regrets her actions and when crossing the border Vincent hides in the boot of the car only to be caught after an officer becomes suspiciousness of Tilly. Jim McGinn (Dan Tetsell) informs Vincent that he must be honest about his sexuality to remain in the United Kingdom. George visits Vincent in remand and discovers he is being beaten up. George dresses differently, in the hope that this will help him, but other inmates mock the pair. This results in Vincent declaring his love for George in front of the visiting room.

== Reception ==
Rebecca Bowden writing for Yahoo! said that Vincent was only with Phoebe to suppress his true feelings for men. She opined that had they married, it would have been the "biggest mistake of their lives". Carena Crawford from Reveal chose Vincent and Phoebe's wedding as a "soap highlight" of the day. Alex Meredith writing for GuySpy said that Vincent's sexuality was one of many storylines turning Hollyoaks into a gay themed soap opera. He also branded him "a closeted illegal immigrant from Africa".

Anthony D. Langford from TheBacklot.com has bemoaned the pairing of Vincent and George. He stated that they have no chemistry, nothing in common and should not be together. He described them as "extremely awkward and so forced". But Langford praised the acting, writing and basis of Vincent being an illegal immigrant. He added that Vincent's plight of being gay made "compelling and real" viewing. Months later he stated: "The thing is all the people in this story are likeable and the actors are appealing and talented. But the core of this is Vincent and George as a couple. And that just doesn't work, ruining the whole story." He also criticised Hollyoaks for stating that all involved characters behaved innocently; as he believed Vincent and George's actions to be "mean".
