= Waterloo Road Reunited =

- DVD cover
- Starring: Chelsee Healey; Tachia Newall; Thomas Milner; Lauren Thomas; Lucy Dixon; Zaraah Abrahams; Dean Smith
- No. of episodes: 6

Release
- Original network: BBC Online
- Original release: 2 March – 6 April 2011

Waterloo Road Reunited is a BBC online spin-off series to Waterloo Road, following the lives of several former pupils of Waterloo Road Comprehensive School in Manchester.

In November 2010, the BBC announced Waterloo Road would have an online spin-off mini-series, Waterloo Road Reunited. The series followed former characters of the main show, and their lives after leaving Waterloo Road.

The series began in March 2011. The first episode of Waterloo Road Reunited was uploaded at 9:00pm on 2 March 2011 on the show's official website. The final episode concluded in April 2011.

== Cast and characters ==
- Chelsee Healey as Janeece Bryant
- Lauren Thomas as Aleesha Dillon
- Lucy Dixon as Danielle Harker
- Tachia Newall as Bolton Smilie
- Thomas Milner as Paul Langley
- Zaraah Abrahams as Michaela White
- Dean Smith as Philip Ryan

== Episodes ==
No.	Title	Directed by	Written by	Original release date
1	"The Reunion"	Stewart Svaasand	Laura Klimke	2 March 2011
Michaela White organises a reunion party for the Waterloo Road Class of 2010. What they don't know is that Michaela has a plan and a few surprises up her sleeve.
2	"The Gig"	Stewart Svaasand	Chris Willshaw	9 March 2011
Bolton has his chance at the big time in an MC Battle. Meanwhile, Michaela reveals the results of her DNA test, but Danielle is not convinced.
3	"Stags and Hens"	Stewart Svaasand	Lissa Tognini	16 March 2011
Neither wedding party's celebrations go to plan. Philip has a few surprises on his Stag night. The Hen party has a few hiccups - can the girls get along?
4	"The Wedding"	Stewart Svaasand	Stuart Hill	23 March 2011
It's Michaela and Philip's wedding day, but will the day go as planned? Paul's day goes from bad to worse when he receives some bad news.
5	"A Quiet Night In"	Stewart Svaasand	Stuart Hill	30 March 2011
Paul takes drastic measures in an attempt to fix his problems. Michaela impresses Bolton in how she helps Paul.
6	"Bon Voyage"	Stewart Svaasand	Chris Willshaw	6 April 2011
The gang throw a farewell party for Philip and Michaela. Paul reconciles with his friends. Will Philip and Michaela make it to Dubai?
