= Tilly Evans =

UK soap opera character (created 2011)

- Hollyoaks character
- Portrayed by: Lucy Dixon
- Duration: 2011–2014
- First appearance: 21 June 2011
- Last appearance: 3 January 2014
- Introduced by: Gareth Philips
- Spin-off appearances: Hollyoaks Later (2013)
In-universe information
- Occupation: Student
- Father: Kevin Evans

Tilly Evans is a fictional character from the British Channel 4 soap opera Hollyoaks, played by Lucy Dixon. The actress announced her casting on 30 May 2011. Tilly was introduced to the show, along with two other characters, during a special storyline shot and set in Abersoch, North Wales. She made her first screen appearance on 21 June 2011. Dixon announced her departure in December 2013 and Tilly made her last appearance on 3 January 2014.

Tilly is a confident, intelligent and loyal teenager. Dixon revealed that she shares a few similarities with her character, including her generosity and positive attitude. Tilly is lesbian and comfortable with her sexuality, which Dixon hoped viewers would be able to relate to. While she is Abersoch, Tilly embarks on a brief holiday romance with Esther Bloom (Jazmine Franks). During the storyline, Dixon filmed her first gay kiss. Tilly's storylines have included relationships with teacher, Jen Gilmore (Amy Downham), Esther, and Chloe (Susan Loughnane), the latter whom she left the village with to live in Dublin.

== Casting ==
On 30 May 2011, Dixon announced through her Twitter account that she had joined the regular cast of Hollyoaks. Dixon revealed that she would begin filming the following week, before making her screen debut on 21 June. Shortly afterwards, Hollyoaks producers announced that Dixon's character, Tilly, would be introduced to the show along with two other new characters, Maddie Morrison (Scarlett Bowman) and Jono (Dylan Llewellyn), during a special storyline set and shot in Abersoch. It was also revealed that while Tilly was planning to go to London after the holiday, it seemed likely that she would arrive in Chester with the others in September.

== Development ==
=== Characterisation ===
"I think she just represents the general 16/17-year-olds in a brilliant way. Not all teenagers are binge-drinkers, and Tilly is the exact opposite of anything like that. She shows the good in teenagers. She's a hard worker, she's confident and self-assured."

— Dixon on Tilly's personality (2011)

Dixon noted that while Tilly was not always the centre of attention, she did not mind and enjoyed looking on from the sidelines. Dixon thought Tilly was confident in herself and "fiercely independent." During a Q&A with a Channel 4 Press writer, Dixon described Tilly as being "Loyal, kind-hearted, intelligent, generous, impulsive and she wears her heart on her sleeve." A writer for the Hollyoaks website quipped that Tilly was "the cleverest clogs in Hollyoaks Sixth Form." They also said she kind and loved by all. Tilly often plays the role of the agony aunt, especially to her best friends George Smith (Steven Roberts) and Maddie Morrison (Scarlett Bowman). Dixon compared Tilly and Maddie's relationship to chalk and cheese, saying that Tilly saw through Maddie's "confident façade". When asked if she shared any similarities with Tilly, Dixon thought she was loyal like her and shared her positive attitude. She also believed that they were both generous and saw the good in the people around them. Tilly is a studious character and loves to read, which has rubbed off on Dixon.

Dixon sports a short hair style to help portray Tilly's androgynous style. She told Elizabeth Horsfall from AGENT2 Magazine that her character's style is also quirky and edgy. Dixon and the Hollyoaks stylist started off buying clothes for Tilly in Topshop because it carries many different styles, which made it easier to "stamp a trend" on what the character was going to be like, before searching further stores. Dixon was initially unsure when the stylist picked out prints that clashed, as she knew she would never wear them in real life, but they worked for her character. The actress hoped that viewers would be able to relate to Tilly, especially as she does not make a big issue out of the fact that she is a lesbian. Dixon commented "She's not defined by her sexuality, nobody is and I think that really shines through." The actress explained that she was excited about playing a lesbian character because she had not played one before and thought it would be a challenge. She said Tilly was comfortable with her sexuality and thought that she was the first young lesbian character that the show had really developed.

=== Holiday romance ===
While she is in Abersoch, Tilly embarks on a summer romance with Esther Bloom (Jazmine Franks). Dixon liked that the storyline was not over the top and thought it showed "a genuine romance that was at its first stage". Dixon experienced her first gay kiss during the storyline, which she was nervous about filming as she had only met Franks three hours beforehand. Describing the kissing scene, Dixon said that she and Franks did not want it to be too racy because the characters were just getting to know each other. She said "We were very relaxed – we just said: 'Look, we're both in the same boat,' so we just went for it." Asked by Horsfall whether Tilly would continue with the romance, Dixon replied that she would not. She explained that while Esther wants it to go on, Tilly is a realist, who always knew it was not going to happen.

Dixon continued, "I think Tilly could be a bit of a player. You can tell from her take on relationships that she's had quite a few and they've never been mega serious, they just are what they are. That's what I like about her." She added that Tilly keeps her options open and thought that she would be unlikely to settle down anytime soon. Tilly later kisses Esther, but continues to reject the chance to form a relationship with her. Dixon said that Tilly eventually realises that she has been giving Esther mixed signals and had been unaware of much she had hurt her. The actress believed that Tilly genuinely liked Esther and would not want to jeopardise the friendship they share.

=== Relationship with Jen Gilmore ===
In April 2012, Jen Gilmore (Amy Downham) was introduced to Hollyoaks as a love interest for Tilly. Tilly and Jen meet at an art exhibition that Tilly has organised. When Jen turns down Neil Cooper's (Tosin Cole) advances, Tilly become curious and decides to find out more about her. Dixon told Daniel Kilkelly from Digital Spy that things get off to a bad start when Jen, who is an art teacher, criticises a piece of art work that Tilly created. However, when Tilly sees Jen in the village, she agrees to put her revision on hold to visit the beach with her. Dixon quipped that Tilly never does anything rebellious and is attracted to Jen's adventurous personality. When asked what happens next, Dixon explained "They head to Crosby Beach, and they have an amazing day. They see the Anthony Gormley [sic] statues together, and Tilly's just in awe of Jen. She's so free and she's so full of life, and that's what Tilly ends up falling in love with. They end up sharing a really tender kiss, which is a brilliant moment for Tilly – she's on cloud nine." Things become complicated for Tilly when she realises that Jen has assumed that she is a university student, rather than a college student. Tilly decides not to correct Jen's assumption, but she later sees Jen with her headmistress and she is gutted when she realises that Jen is going to be a teacher at the college.

Susan Hill from the Daily Star reported that Tilly would try to avoid Jen instead of facing up to the problem. However, her plan would go wrong when she becomes trapped in a store cupboard during a fire. The storyline starts when the fire alarm goes off at the college, causing an evacuation. As Tilly starts to make her way outside, Jen appears and Tilly hides in the store cupboard, which the caretaker locks. Realising she is trapped, Tilly tries to contact Maddie, but does not take the situation too seriously as she believes it is a drill. However, when smoke starts entering the cupboard, Tilly panics. Dixon explained that Tilly spots a window at the top of the cupboard and tries to climb up towards it, but she slips and knocks herself out. Dixon thought that it was "an exciting, action-packed week for Tilly!" Dixon told Kilkelly that filming the storyline was fun and she got to work with a director who she previously worked with on Waterloo Road. She said that the shoot took a whole afternoon and she was really proud of it. Dixon thought that as student-teacher relationships are forbidden, Tilly and Jen were not supposed to be together. However, she added "I think that would be interesting for the audience to watch – would Tilly rule with her heart first, or her head?"

Tilly and Jen continue seeing each other, leading to fans of the couple nicknaming them Jelly. However, things start to go wrong for the couple and when Tilly threatens to expose their affair, Jen falsely claims that Tilly has been harassing her and gets her excluded. Tilly does not give up and gives Esther's "tell-all diary", which contains details of her relationship with Jen, to John Paul McQueen (James Sutton). She also plants images of her and Jen together in a presentation piece that Jen is giving, which leads to Jen's dismissal from the college. The storyline also marked Downham's exit from the show. The actress stated that Jen has "a lot of hate towards Tilly", but when Tilly outs their affair, she is heartbroken. They both end up apologising to each other because they still care about one another.

=== Departure ===
On 27 December 2013, it was announced that Dixon had decided to leave the role. The actress wanted to pursue other projects, particularly theatre work. Of her departure, Dixon said "I'm sad because it's the end of an era and I've had a fantastic two and a half years on Hollyoaks. I've met so many lovely people, I've learned so much about acting and I've had a brilliant character to play. I'll miss the people like crazy and I'll also miss playing Tilly, because she was fantastic." Dixon explained that she spoke to the producer in June or July about leaving the show and that he "really listened" to what she had to say. Dixon filmed her last scene on her penultimate day, as the show films out of sequence.

Tilly's departure will tie in with the departure of fellow character Chloe (Susan Loughnane). Dixon told a reporter from the Daily Star that the relationship with Esther had ruined Tilly's characterisation. While with Esther, Dixon felt that Tilly lost the "desire in her eyes", but Chloe brings back her "naughty side".

== Storylines ==
Tilly has a holiday romance with Esther in Abersoch but tells Esther they can not carry a long distance relationship as she plans to move to London in September for sixth form. However she arrives in Hollyoaks village in September and joins the sixth form college but decides not to reconcile her romance with Esther. She begins a friendship with Jason Costello (Victoria Atkin), supporting him through him wanting hormone blockers. Tilly later becomes under pressure from her studies. She does much revision for a presentation, which she eventually gets marked down for. Tilly becomes upset that she is not getting the grades she wanted. Tilly goes on a night out to a gay bar to try and enjoy herself. She kisses Esther, who accuses her of using her. Tilly apologises to her for leading her on and they become friends again. Tilly meets an art teacher at an exhibition and they go on a date. They begin dating, but Jen begins working at Tilly's college. Tilly becomes trapped in a storage cupboard during a fire when she hides from Jen. Diane O'Connor (Alex Fletcher) discovers Tilly and Jen's relationship, but they carry on in secret. Esther captures Jen kissing Tilly and the rumour spreads around the college. Esther protects Tilly by publicly announcing that she made the rumour up.

Jen decides to concentrate on her career and breaks up with Tilly. She is upset by their break up and is arrested for stealing Ash Kane's (Holly Weston) motor scooter. Her father, Kevin Evans (William Ilkley) is angry with Tilly. She fails to support Esther when Maddie begins to bully her. However, Tilly later denounces Maddie's actions before Maddie dies in a bus crash. Jen later convinces Tilly to give their relationship another go. While out on a date with Tilly, Jen finds Esther drinking vodka before she attempts suicide. Jen forces Tilly to keep quiet about it to conceal their relationship. When Tilly threatens to reveal the truth, Jen reports Tilly claiming that she has been harassing her. Tilly is excluded, but she vows to clear her name and exposes their relationship to the school. She then supports Esther through her recovery. Tilly begins spending more time with Esther when she helps her out with an assignment. Esther starts behaving strangely, which Tilly becomes concerned about. She confronts Esther, who admits that she has romantic feelings for Tilly and they kiss. Tilly and Esther begin dating. Tilly supports Esther after she is held hostage and almost murdered by Jade Hedy (Lucy Gape). Frankie is horrified when she catches Esther and Tilly about to take things further, but decides the girls can see each other. When Chloe arrives in the village, Tilly falls for her and decides to break up with Esther, moving to Ireland to be with Chloe.

== Reception ==
For her portrayal of Tilly, Dixon received a nomination for Best Actress at the 2012 TV Choice Awards. The following year, she was included on the longlist for Best Serial Drama Performance at the National Television Awards. A reporter from OK! branded Tilly "wise and witty". A columnist from the Sunday Mercury quipped that "Tilly quickly comes to learn just how the course of true love never runs smoothly in Hollyoaks" when she learned who Jen was.

Anthony D. Langford from TheBacklot stated "I usually don't pay much attention to the show's lesbian characters and stories, but I love Tilly, the teen lesbian on the show. She's so sweet and cute, right down to her adorable wardrobe. And I'm interested in seeing how her new romance with Jen turns out, even though I think the show is rushing through the story with its usual breathless pace." Following Jen's exit, Laura Morgan from All About Soap commented "It was amazing to watch normally timid Tilly kick some butt and get revenge on her ex-lover by putting incriminating kissing pics on the college projector". Morgan added that Jelly's relationship was "pretty short-lived" and wanted it to continue for longer.
