= Doug Carter =

British soap opera character

- Hollyoaks character
- Portrayed by: PJ Brennan
- Duration: 2010–2013
- First appearance: 13 September 2010
- Last appearance: 16 October 2013
- Introduced by: Paul Marquess
- Spin-off appearances: Hollyoaks Freshers (2010); Hollyoaks Later (2011)
In-universe information
- Occupation: Student (2010); Drug dealer (2010–2011, 2013); Deli owner (2012–2013)
- Father: Herb Carter
- Mother: Connie Carter
- Brothers: Brad Carter
- Civil partner: Ste Hay (2012–2013)
- Stepsons: Lucas Hay
- Stepdaughters: Leah Barnes (adoptive)
- First cousins: Aspen Carter

Doug Carter is a fictional character from the British soap opera Hollyoaks, played by PJ Brennan. Brennan initially appeared as Doug in the programme's online spin-off series Hollyoaks: Freshers, before his debut in the main show on 13 September 2010. He appeared in 5 episodes before returning on 13 January 2011 as a regular character.

He was introduced as part of a new student group. His storylines have included drug dealing, a relationship with Jenny (Daisy Turner) which ended in her murder at the hands of a serial killer, an attempted suicide, and entering a civil partnership with Ste Hay (Kieron Richardson). Doug has been described as someone who "doesn't make the best choices" but has the "best intentions". Doug has been described as a fan favourite and came first in a poll to find viewer's favourite of the new fresher group.

Brennan decided to leave Hollyoaks in 2013 but, his exit was kept secret until transmission where Doug was killed in the show's 18th anniversary. Doug departed on 16 October 2013.

== Creation and casting ==
Doug was created as one of three new fresher students - alongside Jamil Fadel (Sikander Malik) and Leanne Holiday (Jessica Forrest), he was introduced through the series' online spin-off Hollyoaks: Freshers. Brennan's casting was announced on 15 July 2011. Channel 4's cross-platform commissioner Jody Smith told Alistair Houghton from the Liverpool Daily Post that the series would depict the new characters' "back stories and journey to Hollyoaks". Doug is Brennan's first television role; he auditioned in April 2010 after completing a degree at the Central School of Speech and Drama. Doug was written as an Irish character who would arrive alongside Brendan Brady (Emmett J. Scanlan). Brennan hails from the US and Doug's nationality was later changed. He appeared as Doug in the main series for five episodes and then departed due to his guest role contract. Brennan told Daniel Kilkelly of Digital Spy that he knew Doug would just be a "catalyst for changes" in other characters storylines.

On 14 December 2010, it was announced that Doug would be returning to the series. Series producer Paul Marquess told Kilkelly that his team thought Doug was "great" and "brought a very different flavour". Brennan was asked to return in the month following Doug's on-screen debut. He had hoped for a return, but was also content with his character's initial story arc because it featured "a beginning, a middle and an end". In October 2011, Brennan revealed that he would continue to appear in the series and said that Doug would gain a more prominent role within the series.

== Development ==
=== Characterisation ===
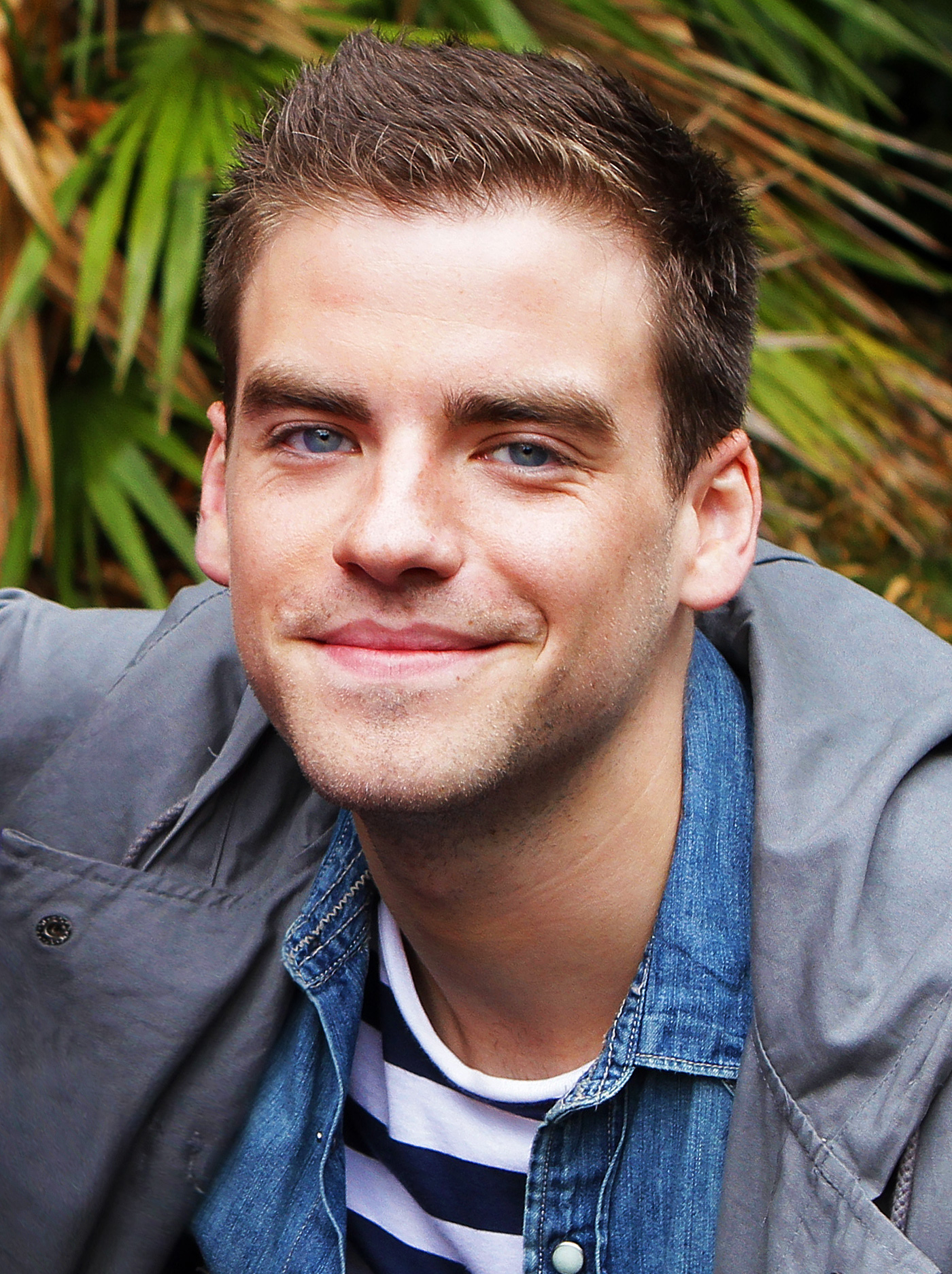
PJ Brennan (pictured) has expressed his hope that Doug will stop acting "cowardly".

A writer from E4.com described Doug as a "charming fresher with a dark past" and a "sly dog" for dalliances with two female students. Brennan told Kilkelly that Doug is a complicated person who changes over time - he is not a very good drug dealer and makes the wrong choices. He gets himself into situations by "his own making", but does have "the best intentions". Brennan explained that his character is not a bad person and he enjoyed playing him because Doug is not "two-dimensional". Doug has both a good and bad side and faces "ups and downs". Doug eventually makes an effort to change his ways. Brenndan said that a constant for Doug was his awareness of staying on "the straight and narrow". Even though he has his "missteps" - he focuses on change. Brennan felt that Doug's do-gooder actions are always based on the fact that he had hurt others and made the wrong choices. Brennan later opined that Doug had transformed into "quite a moral person".

In April 2012, Brennan told Jack Mills from Wonderland magazine that Doug has "evolved". A man with "more barriers on the surface"; he was no longer the character who hooked up with ladies, "bragged, [...] made terrible decisions and was self-obsessed". Any bad judgments are not as intentional as they once were. The audience were also able to better relate to Doug's mistakes. He used to need a purpose and place to belong, which was why he dealt drugs. Brennan explained that he had finally begun to settle and "make real connections with people". One trait that the actor felt Doug need to lose was his "cowardly" persona. Doug has an inability to approach a situation directly; he avoids it and becomes a "bit of a shoegazer". Brennan said that Doug needed to "pull himself out of" his "avoider" ways. If there was any advice he could give to Doug, Brennan would warn him off going on any more blind dates.

Brennan has an American accent which altered due to differing inflections, a trait which he felt fitted in with Doug's backstory of travelling abroad. Brennan told a writer from Heat that Doug's wardrobe consists of a collection of "itchy Christmas jumpers" and chinos. He added that Doug "must have gone crazy in Topman", because he sports a "pretty preppy" style.

=== Introduction and relationship with Jenny ===
Doug arrives as a new student and quickly causes trouble. Brennan told a writer from Inside Soap that "Doug wants as many experiences as possible. He kisses both Leanne and Jem Costello (Helen Russell-Clark) and then gets attacked. Doug "has a list of suspects" and attempts to find out who attacked him; but ends up discovering a secret about Kevin Smith (Cameron Crighton). Brennan explained that Doug "is a mess" and sells drugs to Charlotte Lau (Amy Yamazaki). However she climbs onto the village archway and falls off, damaging her spine as a result. The actor added that it all happened fast, but Doug did try to get Charlotte down. He "feels terrible" about being linked to her accident and takes a cocaine overdose. Brennan worried about how Doug could be redeemed after nearly causing Charlotte's death. He told Kilkelly that he expected all of the characters to reject Doug. However, Doug makes amends by replacing items he stole from his fellow students. Brennan thought that it set Doug "off on the right foot" and he had become someone that the audience could empathise with more in comparison to his initial stint.

Doug is reunited with Jenny (Daisy Turner), a past holiday romance. She begins to scam Warren Fox (Jamie Lomas) but instead decides to meet up with a man from an internet dating site. She meets up with him only for him to be revealed to be Silas Blissett (Jeff Rawle). Silas drugs Jenny before murdering her. Jenny and Doug's reunion was featured in Digital Spy's "Pic of the day" feature. Brennan commented on the storyline saying "I liked the surprise of the character being killed. Hollyoaks did their best to keep that a secret until the last minute, and it just heightened the whole story. We knew that we had a very small window of time to make it seem like we had a significant backstory, and I was lucky that Daisy was so giving as an actress, as we immediately had chemistry". Brennan went on to comment that he would like Doug to become involved in Silas's exposure saying: "I have my fingers crossed that Doug will be somehow involved, as I'd love him to be. When I first found out that I was going to get involved in that storyline, I was very excited. I keep saying that I hope a little bit of a Scooby Gang gets together and figures it out, as there's quite a few characters in the village who are involved in some way or another. Maybe those characters could all be brought together in solving the crimes".

=== Friendship with Riley Costello ===
Doug finds out that Mercedes Fisher (Jennifer Metcalfe) has had an affair with Carl Costello (Paul Opacic). Brennan commented on Doug's dilemma of whether or not to tell Mercedes' boyfriend and Carl's son, Riley (Rob Norbury), saying "It's very complicated because Doug doesn't want to be the one to say anything to Riley. That's partly because of the threats coming from Warren, but also because Seth (Miles Higson) knows and Doug thinks that the news would be better coming from Riley's own brother". Brennan commented that "Doug is very separate from the truth of the matter. He knows the secret, but only by chance, while Seth knows all of the people and circumstances involved. That adds to Doug's belief that Seth should be the one to tell the truth, because he's the one with first-hand information about it". Brennan commented on the friendship between Doug and Riley saying "Doug values his friendship with Riley far too much to just stand by and do nothing" adding that "Doug realises that it's do or die, and it might just have to be him that is the bearer of bad news". Doug is threatened by Warren not to tell Riley as he plans on blackmailing Carl. Brennan added that to Doug "the threats feel very real" and "the big question is whether Doug's friendship with Riley is strong enough to overpower those threats…".

=== Suicide attempt ===
On 29 November 2011 it was announced that Steph Roach (Carley Stenson) would return as part of a "Doug-centric episode" as a spirit when Doug "starts to feel lonely and depressed" in the lead up to Christmas and begins questioning whether his life is worth living. Doug decides to jump from a bridge but "then finds himself back at his flat with the heavenly vision of Steph before him". Steph begins trying to convince Doug of his positive impact on the lives of those living in the village. Brennan put Doug's depression down to Doug feeling as if he does not belong in the village. After Doug meets Jodie Wilde (Montana Manning) he attempts to kiss her but is rejected. Brennan said this leaves Doug feeling "rejected and embarrassed". Brennan said Doug being able to see how the village would have differed without him "has a big impact on him". He felt that it showed Doug that he does have a place in the village and will "give him a new perspective on life".

=== Sexuality ===
Doug later enters into business with Ste Hay (Kieron Richardson) and they become good friends. As their friendship grows, Doug begins to develop feelings for Ste. Richardson told television host Myleene Klass that there was a possibility of a relationship developing between Doug and Ste. Doug helps Ste into online dating and develops "feelings" when Ste goes on a date with Adam (Alex Morgan). Richardson explained that there is confusion as to whether Doug is jealous of Ste dating a guy - or just jealous that his friend is being taken from him. Brennan told Alison Slade from TVTimes that Doug wants to "regain control of his life" after seeing Ste and Adam on their date. Doug decides to "go back to something familiar" and sleeps with Texas.

Brennan told a columnist from Soaplife that it was not "difficult to see why these two would find solace in one another". This was because of the commonalities between them - a "strong friendship", a history with Brendan and endured "tough times". Doug's past romances were with females; with the pivotal one being Jenny. Brennan explained that Hollyoaks were not just "turning Doug gay". Doug rethinks what type of love he had for Jenny, but she was "definitely" very important to him. He thought that the storyline was plausible because Doug was only twenty years old and people can discover their sexuality in later life.

Richardson told a writer from TV Buzz that Doug and Ste would not solely be "another love story" because Brendan will be involved. On their dynamic the actor said that "they put each other in their place and I think Doug stops Ste from being so moody and miserable all the time." He also thought that the two men share a "really cute relationship". Brennan and Richardson often call each other outside work to discuss varied ways of playing their scenes.

Ste and Brendan are known by fans under the portmanteau of "Stendan"; while Ste and Doug are referred to as "Stug". The storyline divided the audience as they supported either side. Richardson explained that Stendan fans were "obsessed" with idea of Ste reconciling with Brendan and the Stug fans wanted the opposite. He added that the two groups had "this little war" developing on social networking website Twitter.

Brennan himself is gay and he told Jenna Good from Reveal that unlike Doug, it had never been an issue - but there were certain aspects of Doug's persona that he related to and sympathised with. Brennan is protective of Doug and made slight changes to the storyline. He said that because sexuality is personal to him, he wanted stereotypes and clichés to be avoided and do the story some "justice". The actor wanted Doug to find happiness because had a "very difficult" year. Though his story needed plenty of "hiccups and bumps along the way" to avoid boring television.

== Storylines ==
Doug takes fellow students Charlotte Lau (Amy Yamazaki), Jamil Fadel (Sikander Malik) and Dave Colburn (Elliot James Langridge) to France. Doug kisses both Jem Costello (Helen Russell-Clark) and Leanne Holiday (Jessica Forrest) and starts dealing drugs for Brendan Brady (Emmett J. Scanlan). He supplies Charlotte with drugs, but she falls from an archway and damages her spine. Doug feels guilty and overdoses on cocaine. While in hospital, Carl Costello (Paul Opacic), who is against Doug being in Jem's life, orders him to return to America. He does so after Carl admits that he was behind a previous attack on Doug. He later returns to make amends and settles back in. After India Longford (Beth Kingston) is murdered her sister, Texas (Bianca Hendrickse-Spendlove), struggles to deal with India's upcoming funeral and so begs Doug to get her some drugs. At first, he refuses; however, he soon gets the drugs off Brendan and gives her the drugs. She takes the drugs and then sleeps with Doug, but she soon regrets it. On the day of India's funeral, Texas takes more drugs and although Doug tries to help her, she was consequently unable to attend India's funeral. Brendan forces Doug to frame Rae Wilson (Alice Barlow) for cocaine dealing. Riley Costello (Rob Norbury) takes Doug to a party. Riley gets drunk and drives and is pulled over by Ethan Scott (Craig Vye). Before Ethan can see who is driving, Doug and Riley switch places so Riley's career is not damaged.

Doug bumps into Jenny (Daisy Turner), whom he knows as "Bex", and it is revealed he was once in a relationship with her. They decide to leave together and scam Brendan and Warren Fox (Jamie Lomas). The plan fails and Jenny arranges a date with Silas Blissett (Jeff Rawle), who she intends to drug and steal from. He realises what she is going to do and drugs her before murdering her. Doug is distraught and accuses Brendan of murdering her but he is not charged. Doug and Riley meet Ruby Button (Anna Shaffer) who lies about her identity. Doug takes Ruby to go back to the flat where they kiss, she gets drunk. Doug discovers Ruby's age and takes her home. Seth Costello (Miles Higson) confides in Doug about his father Carl's affair with Mercedes Fisher (Jennifer Metcalfe), behind Riley's back. Warren gets Doug to tell him of the affair and threatens him to keep quiet. Riley is later angry with Doug for keeping the secret. When Silas murders Rae, Brendan is arrested and Doug blames Cheryl Brady (Bronagh Waugh) for giving him an alibi at the time of Jenny's murder. Lynsey Nolan (Karen Hassan) tells Doug that Silas is going to murder again on Halloween and he believes her. He helps her to try and figure who is next victim shall be. However, they fail to stop him from killing again - but he unintentionally kills his daughter, Heidi Costello (Kim Tiddy).

Doug goes on a date with Jodie Wilde (Montana Manning), but she rejects his advances and tells him he is not over Jenny. Doug faces Christmas alone when Texas and Leanne go to spend it with their families. Doug prepares a meal for one and drinking alcohol. He then goes out and climbs onto a bridge, looks at a photograph of Jenny and throws himself into the river. While unconscious he has visions of Steph Roach (Carley Stenson); she shows him how he has changed the lives of his friends. He then has visions of Jenny and has to choose whether or not to live. Paramedics revive Doug and he decides to move on with his life. Doug and Ste Hay (Kieron Richardson) decide to start a business together. Their first venture fails, so they attempt to get a loan to buy Cincerity and open a deli. They are refused a loan and Doug secretly borrows the money off Brendan. Doug and Ste spend more time together, when Ste hugs Doug he becomes confused. Doug helps Ste set up a dating profile and starts acting different around him. Leanne accuses Doug of being jealous of Ste and he becomes uncomfortable when Leanne makes them perform a flirtation role play. Ste has a date with Adam (Alex Morgan) and Doug becomes jealous. He sleeps with Texas and they blame it on too much alcohol. Doug ruins Ste's date with Adam and during an argument Doug insinuates that he loves Ste and Adam later dumps Ste. Doug confesses his feelings to Ste and they kiss and later start a relationship but Ste later dumps him after Doug reveals he borrowed £80,000 from Brendan. Ste plays Brendan in order for him to clear the debt and then returns to Doug, restarting their relationship.

Doug and Ste become engaged. In the lead up to their wedding, Doug become paranoid about Brendan's involvement in their relationship. Walker (Neil Newbon), an undercover police officer, convinces Doug to help him find evidence on Brendan. Doug agrees but Walker plans to get Doug out of his way so he can kill Ste as to take revenge on Brendan. Walker plans to shoot Ste but in a scuffle he shoots a stray bullet which hits Riley, killing him. Doug later becomes paranoid about Brendan still loving Ste, so he contacts Walker's boss Shawnee (Josie Taylor), telling her he can help get evidence on Brendan. Doug fails at first, but tricks Brendan into admitting that he killed Danny Houston (Darren Day) to protect Ste. Doug records the confession. Doug and Ste marry. At their wedding reception, Ste finds the recording and declares the marriage over. Ste is run over by Maddie Morrison (Scarlett Bowman) after saving his adoptive daughter Leah Barnes (Ela-May Demircan). Maddie then crashes a minibus into the wedding venue. Doug is uninjured, while Ste is left in a coma. When he wakes he can not remember everything that happened prior to the crash. He is released from hospital and Doug reminds him of his attempts to set Brendan up. Doug's parents come to the village and reveal that Doug's father has Parkinson's disease. After much persuasion, Ste agrees to move to America with Doug and his children. Cheryl, believing she is speaking to Ste, tells Doug that she knows Ste still loves Brendan. Doug gives Ste a ticket to Dublin and he leaves for the United States.

When Doug returns, he appears happy and goes back to work at the deli with Ste. Ste tells Doug that he wants to sell his half of the deli so he can buy Chez Chez. Doug finds out that Ste has been using the deli to sell drugs and Ste quits working there. Ste helps his mother to die and Doug supports him. Doug asks for Jim McGinn's (Dan Tetsell) help when Ste sacks his lawyer. Doug wants to use some money from the deli to pay Jim's fee, but Ste is against the idea, convinced that it would be better to let him fight his own battles.

As Doug and Ste prepare to leave together, Leanne throws a last minute leaving party. At the leaving party, Sinead O'Connor (Stephanie Davis) brings back a bag from which she stole from Trevor thinking it is full of cash to give to Doug and Ste as a leaving present, but she is unaware that it is actually a bomb set up by Clare Devine (Gemma Bissix) to kill the McQueens at Mercedes' 30th birthday party at The Loft. Sinead tells Doug she has a surprise for them and he tells her to go get it, when she opens the bag she quickly realises it is a bomb and screams Ste's name but it is too late and the bomb explodes. Gaining consciousness, Doug helps Sinead out of the collapsing building and she tells him that he is bleeding but he ignores it and goes back in for Ste. After finding Ste and attempting to rescue him, the floor collapses above and traps both Doug and Ste. With a wall separating them, the pair share some home truths. After the paramedics find Ste and Doug, Ste tells Doug he is okay but Doug does not reply. As Ste looks over, he sees that Doug has died and holds him in his arms, heartbroken.

Six years later, Ste goes to stay with Doug's parents. Upon returning to the village, he mentions to Tony that Doug's parents are still friendly towards him.

== Reception ==
"He's a bit of an underdog! Doug definitely seems to get himself involved in situations that are not his choice or not of his making, and people seem to empathise with that. He's a character who always seems to be in a pickle, so maybe the audience pity him for that and he's someone who they can root for. I'm very flattered by the positive reaction but I think it's more a credit to the writing and the show itself."

— Brennan on Doug's popularity

Digital Spy's Kilkelly labelled him as being "complex", "destructive", a "bad lad" and "villain". He later described him as a "fan favourite" and with over two thousand votes - Doug won a poll hosted by E4 to determine the audience's favourite student character. Anthony D. Langford from AfterElton praised Doug's friendship with Riley, Ethan and Noah Baxter (Law Thomson). He said that they had formed an "interesting and very cute quartet" and liked their dynamic of boyish attitude and "joking around". He added that Doug's comfortable reaction to Noah's sexuality was positive because if it had been a US soap opera; Doug would have freaked out. Langford later opined that Doug's anger towards Ethan's negligence was realistic. However, he felt that Doug evicting Ethan from his own home was unrealistic. Sarah Morgan from the Daily Record also felt that Hollyoaks was the latest soap to use the concept of the film.

The staff from Soaplife were surprised by Doug and Ste's gay storyline and did not see it coming because they were just "good friends". Digital Spy's readership voted their kiss as the storyline that they were most looking forward to watching.

All About Soap's Carena Crawford and her colleagues had always been "staunch Stendan supporters". However, "Stug" caught their attention and decided that could make a good couple due to their chemistry. The writer opened that Doug and Ste's "long-awaited first kiss" was "pretty hot stuff" and continued in hailing them as "Hollyoaks' hottest new couple". But, she would have liked to see Brendan and Ste to reunite - despite Doug and Ste's "undeniable" chemistry. Crawford concluded that "it's the love triangle to end all love triangles and we just can't decide which way we want Ste to go."
