= Being Victor =

Scottish web and television series

- Genre: Soap opera Teen drama
- Directed by: Robert Elliott
- Starring: Dean Smith; Laura McMonagle; Rebekah Murrell; Jordan McCurrach; Sam Robertson; Inga Stewart
- Opening theme: "Funny for a Girl"
- Composer: Various
- Countries of origin: Scotland, United Kingdom
- Original language: English
- No. of series: 1
- No. of episodes: 20 (internet); 6 (TV)

Production
- Executive producers: Margaret Scott; Ann McManus
- Producers: Robert Elliott; Kat Hebden
- Production locations: Glasgow, Scotland
- Cinematography: Paul Mellon
- Editors: Ian Stroud; James Gellately; Robert Dawson Scott
- Camera setup: Single-camera
- Running time: 8 min approx (internet); 23 min approx (TV)
- Production company: Shed Media Scotland

Original release
- Release: 7 September 2010

Being Victor was a web and television series set in Glasgow, Scotland. It was produced by Shed Media Scotland.

== Synopsis ==
Vinnie Dupe (Dean Smith) is seventeen years old, and he is doing his Highers at Queen Mary’s College in Glasgow, Scotland. He used to get a hard time at school, but college is not too bad, and Vinnie has an active online life to keep him busy, blogging as his witty, scathing alter ego as "Victor Sage".

Vinnie’s best friends are Eva and Doyle. Things start to change as Eva starts dating Danny Burton (Sam Robertson), Vinnie's tormentor. Vinnie is determined to split them up and uses his blog to interfere in his friends' lives.

== Release ==
Being Victor was first released via the internet by MTV UK on 7 September 2010 in a 20-episode form, each up to 10 minutes in length. STV had then broadcast the series on television from 5 October 2010, re-edited into 6 episodes running at approximately 25 minutes.

Victor's blog and Twitter account went live July 2010, prior to the release of the show.

== Production ==
The commission was awarded by CTVC in June/July 2009 to Shed Media Scotland, who developed and produced the concept. The project was then match-funded by the Digital Media IP Fund (jointly financed by the Creative Scotland Innovation Fund and Scottish Enterprise) in August 2009.

The series featured music by: Pooch, X-Lion Tamer, Miniature Dinosaurs, MandaRin, Kochka, Found, Fangs, Cancel the Astronauts and Any Colour Black.

== Articles ==
- Shed Wins Online Drama Commission
- MTV Press Release for Being Victor
- Creative Scotland-supported digital drama to debut on MTV
- STV Press Release
- Being Victor in Roughcuts magazine
