= P. J. Brennan =

American actor (born 1986)

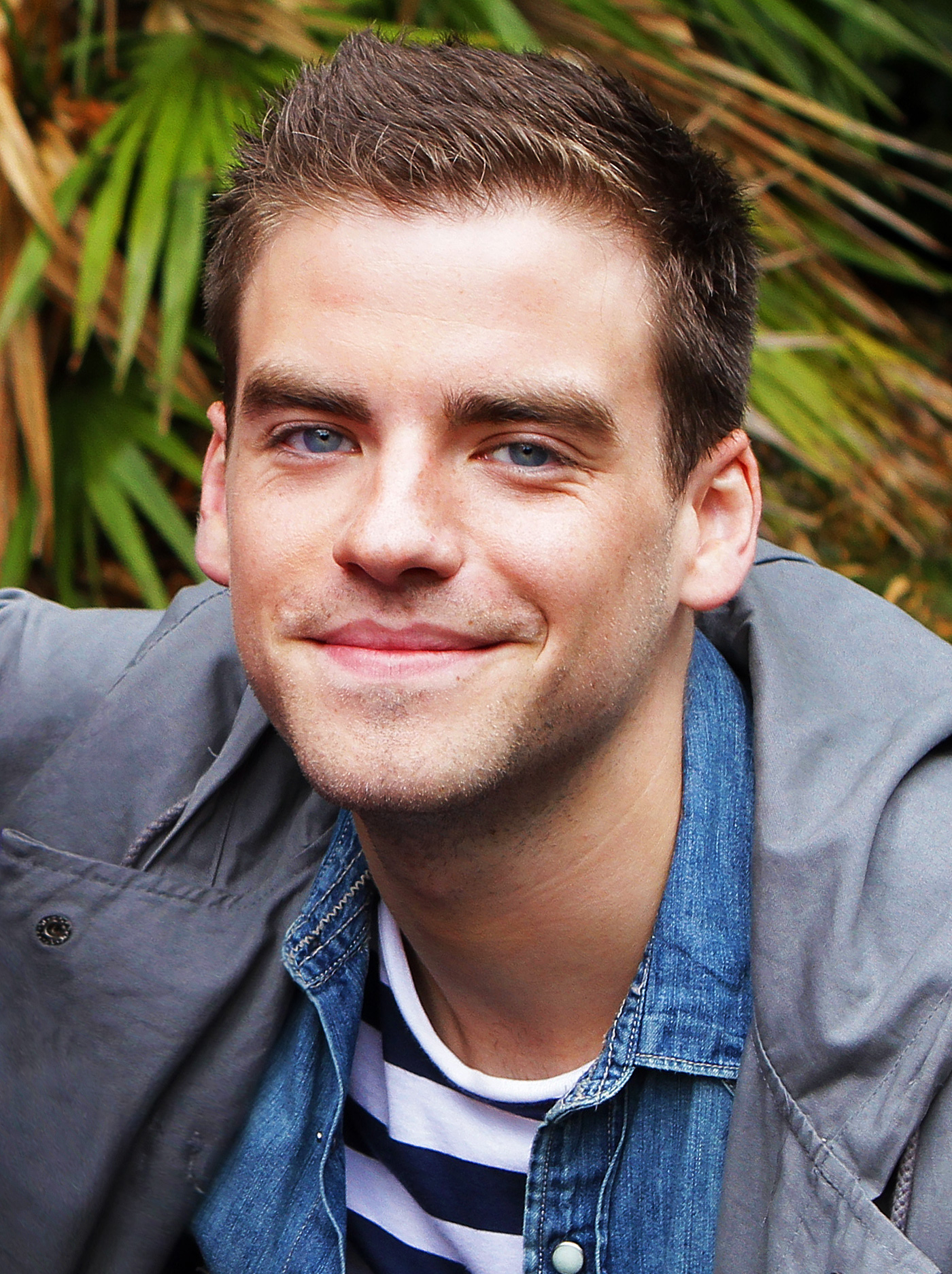
- Born: February 11, 1986 (age 40); Brooklyn, New York, U.S.
- Occupations: Actor, singer
- Years active: 2010–present

Patrick Joseph Brennan (born February 11, 1986, in Brooklyn, New York, United States) is an American actor and singer based in the United Kingdom. He is best known for his role as Doug Carter in the Channel 4 soap opera Hollyoaks. He originally played the role in online spin-off Hollyoaks: Freshers. He also appeared in the BBC Two sitcom Episodes.

== Personal life ==
Brennan refers to himself as being "Irish-American" and was named after an Irish priest. He grew up practising Irish step-dancing. Brennan uses the name "P. J." which is often confused as being a stage name.

Brennan lived in his native United States for the first 21 years of his life before moving to the United Kingdom after graduating from Fordham University, settling in London in September 2007. Brennan attended the prestigious Catholic prep school Xavier High School in Manhattan. Brennan studied at the Central School of Speech and Drama where he completed a three-year degree. Brennan later moved to Liverpool and lived with some of his Hollyoaks cast members including Alice Barlow, Bianca Hendrickse-Spendlove and Jessica Forrest. Brennan is gay.

== Career ==
Hollyoaks was Brennan's first role and he auditioned for the part in April 2010. Brennan's casting at Hollyoaks was announced on July 15, 2010. Brennan initially had a guest role with the show and appeared from September 13, 2010, to September 17 when he left. Brennan was asked to return in October 2010. His return was announced on December 14, 2010. 2019 he is Nate Goldberg in the TV series Tales of the City.

== Filmography ==
Television/Film
Year	Title	Role	Notes
2010-2013	Hollyoaks	Doug Carter	(TV Series), 260 episodes
2011	Hollyoaks Later	Doug Carter	(TV Series), 1 episode: "Episode #4.5"
2014	The Awakening	Robert Lebrun	(TV Series), 5 episodes
2014	The Searchers	Charlie McCorry	(TV Mini-Series), 2 episodes: "Episode #1.1" and "Episode #1.2"
2014	Confidence Man	Patrick	(Short film)
2015	Episodes	Andrew's Assistant (credited as PJ Brennan)	(TV Series), 1 episode: "Episode Two"
2019	Tales of the City	Nate Goldberg (credited as Patrick Joseph Brennan)	(TV Series), 1 episode: "Next Level Sh*t"
2019	Touchscreen	Seth	(Short film)

== Discography ==
=== Extended plays ===
Title	Album details
PJ	Released: November 18, 2016; Label: Independent; Format: Digital download
Pleasure	Released: May 28, 2021; Label: Independent; Format: Digital download
