= The Square Ball =

Fanzine for Leeds United

The Square Ball is a fanzine, blog, and series of podcasts and livestreams related to English football club Leeds United.

== History ==
The Square Ball fanzine was founded in 1989. In 2020, they raised over £10,000 for food banks after completing a 24-hour livestream playing video game Football Manager. In 2022, they raised over £50,000 for mental health charities after completing a 92-mile walk.
