= Susan Loughnane =

Irish actress, author (born 1987)

- Born: Susan Patricia Loughnane; 16 February 1987 (age 39); Malahide, Dublin, Ireland
- Occupations: Actress, Writer
- Years active: 2007–2016
- Spouse: David Doyle (m. 2016)

Susan Patricia Loughnane (born 16 February 1987) is an Irish actress and author. She is known for playing Debbie in drama Love/Hate, for which she won the 2013 Irish Film and Television Award for Best Supporting Actress. Her first novel, The Art of Scandal, was published in October 2014.

== Career ==
Loughnane trained at the Lee Strasberg Theatre and Film Institute in New York City. Loughnane's first role was on the Irish hidden-camera comedy TV series Anonymous as the daughter of Pamela Flood's character Doreen. She then appeared as Elaine in Single-Handed.

Loughnane was also a contestant on the sixth series of Britain's Next Top Model in 2010. She auditioned for the show as "a challenge" to herself and because she was struggling to find work in Ireland due to the recession. She was the last contestant selected for the final fourteen, which she described as "painful". She was eliminated early in the series, but continued to model, and was employed by Morgan the Agency.

Loughnane appeared as Debbie in seasons 2, 3, and 4 of Love/Hate between 2011 and 2013. During this time, she retained her job as a cashier in an Abercrombie & Fitch store, stating she kept the job in case acting "doesn't work out". Initially introduced as the girlfriend of Aidan Gillen's character John Boy, Debbie spiraled into heroin abuse and prostitution before ultimately dying of an overdose in the fourth season. Loughnane won the 2013 Irish Film and Television Award for Best Supporting Actress for the role.

She also played the guest role of Chloe in Hollyoaks in August 2013, and returned for a longer stint in November of that year. She went on to appear in Loving Miss Hatto and The Food Guide to Love in 2010 and 2013 respectively. In 2014, she appeared in Poison Pen alongside Lochlann O'Mearain, before completing a course in standup comedy at the Upright Citizens Brigade in New York. The following year, Loughnane joined the Hardy Bucks television show as Patty.

Loughnane's first novel, The Art of Scandal, was published in October 2014.

== Personal life ==
Loughnane got engaged to her long-term boyfriend, David Doyle, in February 2015, and they married in August 2016. The couple had been dating since they met in secondary school. Loughnane announced her pregnancy on her second wedding anniversary in August 2018.

== Filmography ==
=== Film ===
Year	Title	Role	Notes
2007	The Martyr's Crown	Young Woman	Short film
2007	Hardly Hartley	The Creativity	Short film
2008	Anton	Beautiful French girl	
2009	Hotel Darklight	Derval	
2013	The Food Guide to Love	Fiona	
2014	Poison Pen	Shona	
2014	Out of Reach	Female lead	Short film
2016	A Dark Song	Victoria	

=== Television ===
Year	Title	Role	Notes
2007	Anonymous	Susan	
2010	Britain's Next Top Model	Herself	
2010	Maru	Jane Reynolds	Episode: "The Murder of Rosa Di Lucia"
2010	Single-Handed	Elaine	2 episodes
2010	The Guards	Sarah	Episode: "Brothers"
2010	Loving Miss Hatto	Publishing girl	TV film
2011–2013	Love/Hate	Debbie	
2013–2014	Hollyoaks	Chloe	
2015	Hardy Bucks	Patty	
