= Lucy Dixon =

English actress

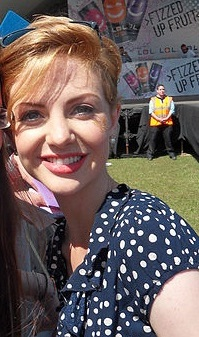
- Born: Lucy Jane Dixon; 9 August 1989 (age 36); Gee Cross, Greater Manchester, England
- Occupation: Actress
- Years active: 2007–present
- Spouse: James Stockdale (m. 2022)

Lucy Jane Dixon (born 9 August 1989) is an English actress, best known for her roles as Danielle Harker in the BBC One school-based drama series Waterloo Road and Tilly Evans in the Channel 4 soap opera Hollyoaks.

== Early life ==
Dixon is from Gee Cross, Hyde and described in an Manchester Evening News interview how she loved acting from the earliest age. She recalled how a role in her school nativity as “shepherd number one” had been what sparked her love for the stage.

== Filmography ==
Year	Title	Role	Notes
2007–2010	Waterloo Road	Danielle Harker	Regular role; 53 episodes
2009	Doctors	Leanne Taylor	Episode: "Innocence"
2011	Waterloo Road Reunited	Danielle Harker	All 6 webisodes
2011–2014	Hollyoaks	Tilly Evans	Regular role; 144 episodes
2014	Scott & Bailey	Chloe Michaels	Episode: "A Matter of Rank"
2015	Casualty	Chloe Wilkinson	Episode: "Estranged"
2016	Birds of a Feather	Emma	Episode: "Abandoned Love"
2020	Doctors	Jen Taylor	Episode: "Untying the Knot"
2021	Coronation Street	Danielle	5 episodes

== Awards and nominations ==
Year	Award	Category	Result	Ref.
2012	TV Choice Awards	Best Soap Newcomer	Nominated	
2013	18th National Television Awards	Serial Drama Performance	Nominated	
