= Aisling Jarrett-Gavin =

English actress

- Born: 1989 or 1990 (age 36–37)
- Education: Sylvia Young Theatre School; Italia Conti Academy of Theatre Arts
- Occupation: Actress
- Years active: c. 1998–
- Agent: The Narrow Road Co
- Television: Meet the Parents; Hollyoaks

Aisling Jarrett-Gavin is an English actress of Irish descent. She grew up in the London Borough of Camden but also often travelled to Dublin. Wanting to act from a young age, Jarrett-Gavin first acted in a commercial at the age of eight and had her secondary education at the Sylvia Young Theatre School but lost interest in acting after leaving school at 16. After working in Harrods, she did a degree at the Italia Conti Academy of Theatre Arts and then was signed onto an agent. The actress' acting credits include the online web series Freak and the second series of Meet the Parents, alongside minor roles in other productions, such as Game of Thrones. Jarrett-Gavin portrayed regular character Darcy Wilde in the Channel 4 soap opera Hollyoaks from 2017 to 2018, and the actress credited the experience as changing her life. Since leaving the soap, the actress had a guest role in The War of the Worlds. Jarrett-Gavin has also had several other jobs in addition to acting during her career.

== Early life ==
"I'd be walking along the street, and people would be offering me weed from age 10, and I'd be like, 'I'm ok, thanks...' I've never had that urge to go backpacking, because I got a lot of that experience from just growing up in a place with so much stimulation."

— Jarrett-Gavin on growing up in Camden (2018)

Aisling Jarrett-Gavin is from London and grew up in the London Borough of Camden, with her school in the middle of Camden Market. She called growing up there "crazy" and "amazing" and believed that the "plethora of different types of people" and the "vibrant lifestyle" gave her some creativity and made her grow up faster. Jarrett-Gavin is also Irish from her father's side, who is from Dublin. The actress has relatives in Clondalkin and she said that Dublin always felt like "a "security blanket" and that she had been travelling there sine the age of two. She considered Dublin to be a contrast to Camden. In her childhood, the actress' grandmother believed that she was too thin and would give her many Kit Kats and other food. Jarrett-Gavin's father had moved to London to work when he was 19-years-old and met the actress' mother, who is from outside London. Jarrett-Gavin's father works in construction whilst her mother is a social worker, and the actress said that her parents both were passionate about music. The actress' nickname as child was Meryl Streep as she would charge her parents' guests for using the bathroom or giving them massages.

When she was in primary school, Jarrett-Gavin performed extracts from A Midsummer Night's Dream, which sparked her interest in acting. At 10-years-old, she applied and auditioned for the Sylvia Young Theatre School. Although her mother wanted her to go to Camden School for Girls, Jarret-Gavin got into the Sylvia Young Theatre School after five auditions; whilst at the school, she had three days of education and two days of vocational training, and she performed in plays such as Chitty Chitty Bang Bang and Joan of Arc at the King's Head Theatre. The actress said that it was a lot to take on and that she had a different focus from her friends, but she felt supported. After leaving school at 16, she was signed onto the Sylvia Young adult agency, but she lost interest of acting. Jarrett-Gavin recalled in an interview to the Irish Independent, "They'd tell me, 'You've got an audition', and I'd be like, 'Oh god… I can't be arsed, I want to be with my boyfriend'. I didn't know what I wanted. I was too young to realise the work that needed to go into this, that you can't just get it on a plate, and I lost all sight of who I was and what I wanted. I had never really had a chance to be young, because very early, I had so much responsibility." She then got a job as a make-up girl at Harrods, which she said was against "everything" that she was as she was forced to wear lipstick and pearls. She then did a three-year at Italia Conti Academy of Theatre Arts and got a 2:1, and she believed that her family was happy that she had a degree to "fall back on".

== Career ==
Jarrett-Gavin's first acting role was in a Kenco advertisement when she was eight years old. In 2002, Jarrett-Gavin was in an episode of the BBC radio comedy King Street Junior Revisited. Jarrett-Gavin portrayed in the 2009 online MySpace series Freak. She also appeared in the 2011 film We Need to Talk About Kieran. After graduating from Italia Conti Academy, she was signed with an agent and soon had a minor role in Valar Dohaeris, the premiere of the third season of fantasy television series Game of Thrones. She then appeared in adverts for BT and portrayed the role of "Sister" in the second series of the E4 comedy show Meet the Parents. In 2014, Jarrett-Gavin played Harriet in the final episode of the miniseries Our Zoo. She then portrayed Hayley in 2016 Derren Brown Presents Twisted Tales, presented by Derren Brown. Jarrett-Gavin has said that she wants to be the female version of Timothy Spall and play "little old ladies, character parts".

"I'm definitely envious of friends who have stability, but I've got to remember that doesn't make me happy. That's been my biggest learning curve. My focus now is being the best actor I can be."

— Jarrett-Gavin in 2018

When she turned 26, Jarrett-Gavin had a "quiet year" in her acting career and felt that she could not cope with the uncertainty of the industry, so she took a job as a business development manager in a London restaurant as she felt that she needed to have a financially stable job. She recalled, "I got so lost in the constraints of society, and I think I hit a real low in my confidence. I was really down. I've got two sides to my personality - I'm driven by being creative, but I also love stability. It was a really crazy time. I got down and lost and convinced myself that I needed to conform". She felt unhappy and lost in her job but was then told that she had received an audition on the Channel 4 soap opera Hollyoaks, so she spent weeks preparing for it and was successful in getting the role; she said that the experience changed things and showed her that "when you put your mind to something and believe, anything is possible". Jarrett-Gavin had watched Hollyoaks as a child. In January 2017, it was officially announced by the actress' agency, The Narrow Road Co, that Jarrett-Gavin had been cast as Darcy Wilde on Hollyoaks. Darcy was introduced as the presumed dead former fiancée Adam Donovan (Jimmy Essex) as part of an "explosive" storyline. Jarrett-Gavin made her first appearance as Darcy in the episode that originally aired on 13 March 2017. The actress described Darcy as scheming, insecure, clever and a "nightmare ex", and she did not think that there were many similarities between them other than some of their style choices and both being from London. The actress preferred portraying Darcy's vulnerable side rather than her usual "bitchy stuff" as she believed that it showed the "true Darcy".

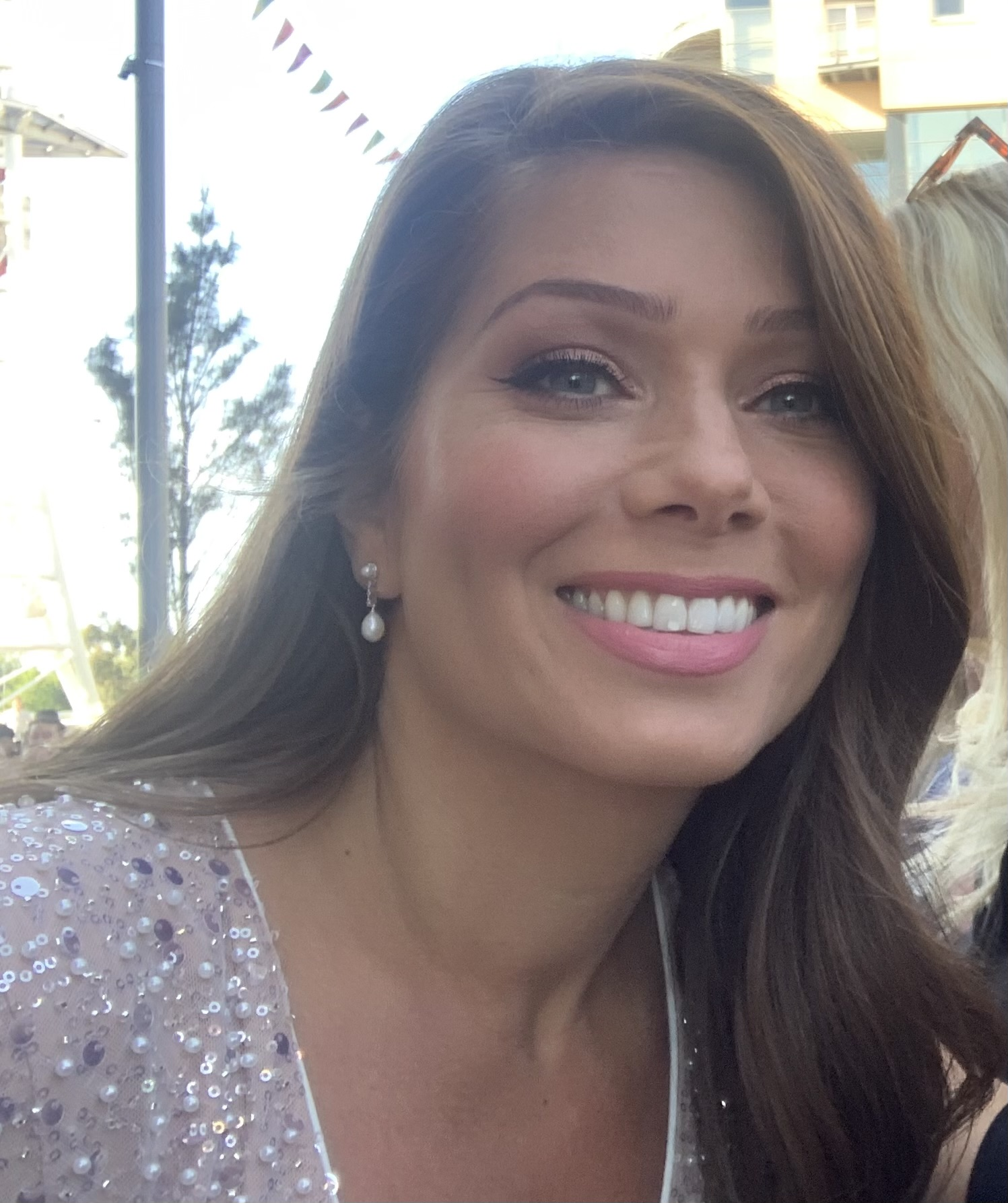
Jarrett-Gavin became good friends with her Hollyoaks colleague Nikki Sanderson (pictured).

During the actress' time on the soap, Darcy's storylines included her attempts to win Adam back, lying about the paternity of her son, Toby Wilde (Lucas Haywood), feuds with Maxine Minniver (Nikki Sanderson), Tracey Donovan (Lisa Maxwell) and others, dating Adam's brother Jesse Donovan (Luke Jerdy), attempting to con Jack Osborne (Jimmy McKenna) out of his money and accidentally poisoning Esther Bloom (Jazmine Franks). Jarrett-Gavin called the soap an "amazing platform" that had changed her life, but she found the recognition from so many fans strange and admitted that she did not get a sense of purpose from it. She also got trolled a lot from people who criticised the character and her acting, which shocked her as she considers herself sensitive, but she grew to get over the opinions and not seek validation from other people, which she believed made her more confident. The actress opined that "growing as an actress" and meeting some "amazing people" were her highlights of 2017. Jarrett-Gavin revealed that the Hollyoaks writers were not expecting such a big reaction from fans and so they made the character more manipulative. She also told Soaplife that Darcy's behaviour would become even darker. Jerdy's girlfriend, Daisy Wood-Davis, who plays Kim Butterfield on the soap, said that she found it a bit strange when she would see Jerdy and Jarrett-Gavin kiss in scenes as she is friends with Jarrett-Gavin. Jarrett-Gavin also praised Haywood, calling him "talented", and said they had a great relationship.

Jarrett-Gavin made her last appearance as Darcy in the episode airing on 26 March 2018. Following her exit, the actress called her time on the soap "incredible" and thanked Hollyoaks fans for "watching, supporting, hating, loving and enjoying the character"; she added that whilst she was happy that some viewers loved Darcy, the fact that other viewers hated the character was a good thing as it meant that she had "done [her] job right". Jarrett-Gavin said that she would miss working with Sanderson as they had had a fun time working together and they became good friends. She also said that working with McKenna and Essex was one of her favourites in the soap; she called McKenna "funny" and kind to work with, and joked that she kept hearing that he was in the movie Highlander, and she revealed that she and Essex went to the same school. Following her departure, Jarrett-Gavin said that she wanted to do theatre work and potentially move out of London. Jarrett-Gavin portrayed Lucy in the first episode of the three-part 2019 miniseries The War of the Worlds.

Outside of acting, Jarrett-Gavin is also part of Architects Benevolent Society, a charity that offers support to the architectural community and their families. The actress has described the charity's support as "incredible" and a "lifeline". Jarrett-Gavin is also Head of People at "Eric Parry Architects". She also has a job where she teaches three-year-old children. In October 2017, Jarrett-Gavin worked with her Hollyoaks colleagues Essex, Maxwell and Tamara Wall (Grace Black) to raise money for the charity Centrepoint as part of its Sleep Out event in Manchester, with the event including the actress and Essex reading a bedtime story. The actress also does work for the animal charity "All Dogs Matter"; she has said that she tries to use her following "to do positive things, no matter how small, to make a difference. Especially in such a self-indulgent profession like this one, it's nice to do something for others".

== Personal life ==
Jarrett-Gavin has said that she is good at making "funny faces" and she also enjoys singing. She has struggled with her mental health during periods of her life. The actress does yoga and barre ballet in order to stay grounded. Her uncle is photographer Tony Gavin. Jarrett-Gavin's husband is from Keele and as of 2017 her mother still lives in London. Jarrett-Gavin is married and they split their Christmas holidays with both of their families. Jarrett-Gavin said in a 2018 interview that she has sausage dog called Mildred, who she considers her best friend, and that she is passionate about animals. She sometimes practises lines with Mildred. Jarrett-Gavin is a fan of the film La La Land and has said that she would enjoy to be in a similar musical film herself; she also praised actress Emma Stone, calling her "talented".

== Filmography ==
List of acting roles
Year(s)	Title	Role	Notes	Ref.
2002	King Street Junior Revisited	Child	1 episode ("Oh No It Isn't")	
2009	Freak	Kelly	Online web series	
2011	We Need to Talk About Kieran	Ebony	Film	
2012	Meet the Parents	Sister	Series 2	
2013	Game of Thrones	Margaery's handmaiden	1 episode ("Valar Dohaeris")	
2014	Our Zoo	Harriet	Guest role (1 episode)	
2016	Derren Brown Presents Twisted Tales	Hayley	Halloween Special	
2017–18	Hollyoaks	Darcy Wilde	Regular role	
2019	The War of the Worlds	Lucy	Guest role (1 episode)	
