= Darcy Wilde =

- Hollyoaks character
- Portrayed by: Aisling Jarrett-Gavin
- Duration: 2017–18
- First appearance: 13 March 2017
- Last appearance: 26 April 2018
- Introduced by: Bryan Kirkwood
In-universe information
- Other names: Rebecca; Darcy Osborne; Devious Darcy
- Occupation: Waitress; Hairdresser
- Family: Osborne
- Husband: Jack Osborne (2018–?) (Note: It is not clear if or when Jack and Darcy divorced.)
- Sons: Toby Wilde

Darcy Wilde (also Osborne, originally credited as Rebecca) is a fictional character from the British Channel 4 soap opera Hollyoaks, played by Aisling Jarrett-Gavin. Her casting and the introduction of Darcy was announced in January 2017, with the character making her first appearance on the episode broadcast on 13 March 2017. Darcy has been characterised as scheming, which has earned the character a reputation for being devious in British media, with the character been referred to as Devious Darcy in Hollyoaks media and by critics. Darcy was first mentioned in 2016 as the former fiancée of Adam Donovan (Jimmy Essex), who had disappeared and was presumed dead. Adam's new girlfriend, Maxine Minniver (Nikki Sanderson), begins digging into Darcy's disappearance and tracks Darcy down, which leads to Darcy moving to Hollyoaks in order to win Adam back.

Jarrett-Gavin revealed that Adam is the love of Darcy's life and that she is working to get him back. Darcy tries to get Adam back by telling him that he is the father of her son, Toby Wilde (Lucas Haywood), though Adam stays loyal to Maxine. She continues scheming by meddling in their wedding and engagement party, and she later begins a relationship and engagement with Adam's brother, Jesse Donovan (Luke Jerdy), in order to get closer to Adam and win him back. Darcy's plan is successful when Adam gets back together with her, but their happiness is threatened when she accidentally kills Adam and Jesse's mother, Tracey Donovan (Lisa Maxwell), who had found out that Adam was not the biological father of Toby. Adam then breaks up with Darcy when he finds out that his own father, Glenn Donovan (Neil Roberts/Bob Cryer), is Toby's true biological father.

Following the end of her storyline with Adam, Darcy was not written out, with the actress revealing that Darcy would get involved with another Hollyoaks family. This was revealed to be the Osborne family, which begins when Jack Osborne (Jimmy McKenna) takes Darcy under his wing. Darcy then tries to con Tom Cunningham (Ellis Hollins) out of his money, but she is thwarted. Thinking that Jack is dying, Darcy manipulates Jack into thinking that he has feelings for her and the two begin a relationship, much to the anger of Jack's family, who try to unsuccessfully expose Darcy's antics. Jarrett-Gavin explained that Darcy is trying to take Jack's money in order to provide the best possible life for Toby. The actress enjoyed working with McKenna and revealed that it was her favourite experience on the soap. When Darcy finds out that Jack is no longer dying, she attempts to poison him. Despite having second thoughts, the plan puts Esther Bloom (Jazmine Franks) in hospital when she consumes the poisoned drink intended for Jack. This ends Darcy and Jack's short marriage and leads to Darcy's departure, who leaves with Toby in order to escape paying for her crimes. Darcy made her last appearance on 26 April 2018, which was not announced prior.

Darcy has received a mixed reception. Some critics were excited for Darcy's arrival and the storylines it would create. Jarrett-Gavin revealed that viewers had mixed reactions towards Darcy, and she explained that she did not mind that some viewers hated Darcy as it meant that she had completed her portrayal of the character right. Critics and fans expressed disgust at Darcy's age-gap relationship with Jack, with Hollyoaks cast member Jessica Fox (Nancy Hayton) also disliking their relationship. Some fans expressed happiness over Darcy's departure, whilst several critics and fans expressed joy when Darcy was caught out and exposed during her time on the soap.

== Casting and creation ==
In 2016, episodes "indicated" that newly established character Adam Donovan (Jimmy Essex) had a "dark" and "traumatic" backstory, which was demonstrated when Adam's girlfriend Maxine Minniver (Nikki Sanderson) finds an engagement ring in Adam's possessions, leading to Adam revealing that it belongs to his former fiancée. A Hollyoaks trailer released in November 2016 showed a newspaper cutting referring to Adam's fiancée, Darcy Wilde, with it revealing that she had disappeared in "suspicious circumstances" whilst on holiday with Adam, who was suspected of being involved in the disappearance. Sophie Dainty from Digital Spy called the spoiler "ominous" and speculated that "some very big secrets could be about to unravel", and questioned whether Darcy was dead or alive and whether Adam's family would be involved. It was later revealed that Adam's brother, Liam Donovan (Maxim Baldry), is "harbouring" a "huge secret" about Darcy and that their other brother, Jesse Donovan (Luke Jerdy), had an "unhealthy infatuation" with Darcy, with it also being suggested that the brothers' half-sister Grace Black (Tamara Wall) and their mother Tracey Donovan (Lisa Maxwell) are hiding something about it as well. In January 2017, it was announced that the "currently presumed dead" Darcy is would debut in the soap in an "explosive twist" that would bring "answers" that viewers and critics have been "longing" for. It was announced that actress Aisling Jarrett-Gavin had been cast in the regular role, with the news being announced by her talent agency, The Narrow Road Co. Aisling Jarrett-Gavin made her first appearance as Darcy in the episode that originally aired on 13 March 2017.

== Characterisation ==
"Darcy definitely has a soft side. This front she puts on is her armour against the world. Behind closed doors she yearns to feel loved, safe and secure. Her little boy is her priority and she honestly believes all her actions are part and parcel of making a better life for Toby."

— Jarrett-Gavin on Darcy's softer side (2018)

Speaking in a 2017 #HollyGoss YouTube video about Darcy's introduction, Jarrett-Gavin described the character as "Adam's nightmare ex" who is "really clever" and has "a good style". Jarrett-Gavin also explained that Darcy can be "quite scheming" and sometimes lies, which Jarrett-Gavin explained comes from the character's "insecurity". She also commented that the character likes things to be "neutral and classic". Jarrett-Gavin explained that there are not many similarities between her and Darcy other than them both being from London and a bit of their style, though commented that Darcy is more "girly" than herself. She also joked that Darcy would not "approve" of Adam living in a messy house and would have "kept him on the straight and narrow". Speaking of the character's backstory, Jarrett-Gavin explained that Darcy did not "make much of a good impression" when she was originally with Adam, as she "wanted to have this fast paced lifestyle in London, very cool and wild" which ended up setting "the whole family". The actress noted that Darcy had never loved anyone else like she loved Adam, saying the characters were "school sweethearts", and that Darcy still "100 percent she has feelings for Adam" and "is ready to get her claws into the love of her life". When asked what Jarrett-Gavin would get Darcy for Christmas, the actress replied "A million pounds and a drop of kindness".

In the media, and by Hollyoaks itself, such as in YouTube videos and hashtags, the character has been referred to as "Devious Darcy". Darcy has also been described as a "schemer". In 2018, the actress called Darcy a "great character" to play and revealed that her favourite quality of Darcy's is her vulnerability, saying that Darcy "might seem like a villain to most, but she has an emotional soft and scared side", which the actress believes makes Darcy "really interesting to play". The actress also added that Darcy "lives her life in fear" and is "always scared" that she will be caught, but "luckily" is "very good at deception".

== Development ==
=== Introduction ===
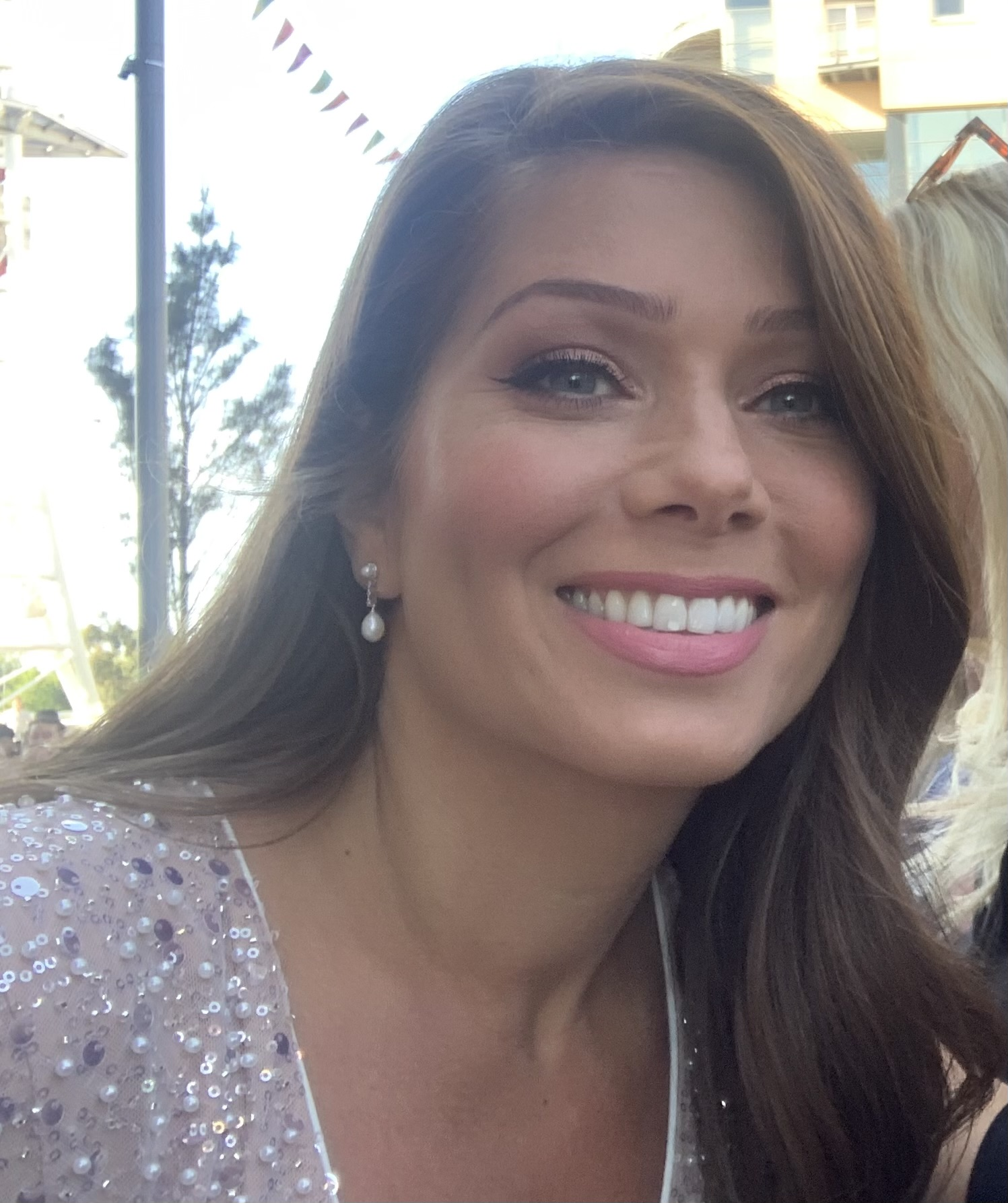
Nikki Sanderson portrays Maxine Minniver, who tracks Darcy down in order to give Adam Donovan closure.

Darcy first appears when Maxine tracks down "Rebecca", who Maxine believes know something about Darcy. "Rebecca" lies and claims she does not anything about Darcy's disappearance, but Maxine later realises that "Rebecca" is actually Darcy when she sees Darcy's picture in an old newspaper. Hollyoaks had teased Maxine's meeting with "Rebecca" but it was not revealed that she was Darcy until the episode aired. Maxine, wanting to confirm her suspicions, then confronts Darcy a second time, this time with Tracey. A heated confrontation then occurs between Maxine and Darcy. Nikki Sanderson, Maxine's portrayer, revealed that Maxine is "nervous" over the outcome of Maxine's findings as she is worried about whether Darcy's reappearance in Adam's life will affect his relationship with her, explaining that "Obviously Maxine knows that Darcy was the love of Adam's life and he still doesn't have closure on that, so she questions where it would leave her if Darcy did ever come back. She's nervous and scared about that but also, curiosity killed the cat. She wants to know and she wants closure on it too". Sanderson explained that Maxine is "infatuated" as she wants to find closure for Adam as there is always "a little bit of Darcy hanging in the background" of their relationship, which she wants to get rid of. The actress revealed that whilst Maxine knows that bringing back Darcy can cause potential problems, she is more focussing on getting Darcy out of Adam's thoughts. She added:

"The ideal outcome would be that if Darcy is dead then her and Adam can move forward together as a couple and become stronger and happier together. If she isn't and she comes back, the ideal outcome would be that Adam gets final closure on her and it gives Adam and Maxine the push to move forward with their relationship knowing that Adam does truly love Maxine and would choose her over Darcy."

Although Maxine is confident that she knows the truth about Darcy, she struggles to tell Adam. Darcy then reappears at Maxine and Adam's engagement party, with Jarrett-Gavin reflecting that Darcy's appearance was a "huge shock" for Adam due to everyone believing that she was dead. Darcy later begins her plan of trying to get Adam back by kissing him on the bridge in front of "everyone", including Maxine.

=== Scheming and introduction of son ===
Following Darcy's arrival, it was revealed that Adam would receive a "life-changing shock" when Darcy tells Adam that he is the father of her previously unknown son, Toby Wilde (Lucas Haywood). She reveals this to Adam when he makes a decision to be with Maxine over Darcy, and then brings Toby to the village when the couple struggle to believe her. Katy Brent from Closer called this a "shock revelation" and revealed that Maxine would not be happy about the news. Essex, Adam's portrayer, revealed that this leaves Adam in "shock" as he has "missed out on so much with Darcy already, and this is now a little insight into what she's probably been up to this whole time." He also revealed that Adam is also "excited" but "going through a lot", adding that "To find out the person you love is now alive and now has a son – there's a lot of pressure on him. His decision-making is going to be quite clouded at the moment. He's actually really torn – there's no clear decision for him yet." Essex also revealed that he believed that Adam should be with Maxine over Darcy due to him being happier with Maxine, but the actor acknowledged that Darcy knows Adam better than Maxine, and revealed that he now had a slower-paced life than he did with Maxine. Speaking of their backstory, Essex explained that Darcy used to "mess him around and keep him on his toes a little bit", though admitted that Adam had gotten over it due to being a bit older now. Essex teased that Adam would take "a long time" to make his decision between the two women and that they would both do things that will "push Adam away". The actor also noted that the decision is "really difficult" for Adam due to not wanting to upset anyone, with the character wishing that Darcy had "never showed up at all".

Darcy then causes trouble by ruining Maxine and Aam's engagement party by arranging Toby's birthday party on the same day, which leads to Maxine drinking too much due to struggling with Darcy's "mean meddling". Darcy continues to try splitting Maxine and Adam up, and uses Toby as a "pawn" in her games when she orders Toby to ruin Maxine's wedding dress, which angers a "horrified" Maxine. Following the "shocking move", Darcy orders Toby to give her an apology, despite having given him "strict instructions" over what to say.

Darcy later begins a relationship with Adam's brother, Jesse, in an attempt to win Adam back, and she later proposes to him in order to get closer to the family. The proposal "sparks outrage" from Tracey and Adam. Daniel Kilkelly from Digital Spy noted that not everyone is "happy over the impending nuptials" and speculated that Jesse is "a pawn" in Darcy's games". Tracey, who has now served time in prison for pushing Darcy, "can't believe her eyes" due to seeing Darcy "so close to her sons" upon her return. Jarrett-Gavin commented on Darcy's "survival skills" and concluded that Darcy's belief is that getting together with Jesse would be "the one thing" that would "get" to Adam as it would potentially make him realise that he is not over her. Jarrett-Gavin also noted that Darcy did not think she would be able to get Adam back and thus was using "any tactic" to achieve the goal. She also commented that "Poor Jesse" did not deserve the treatment he received.

Adam and Darcy eventually rekindle their relationship, which leaves Maxine heartbroken and leads to her temporarily leaving the village.

=== Tracey's death and Glenn ===
In August 2017, Darcy is seen meeting a "mystery man" portrayed by Neil Roberts. His identity was initially kept a secret from viewers until the following month when he was revealed to be Glenn Donovan, the father of Adam, Liam and Jesse and the former husband of Tracey, in the Hollyoaks Autumn trailer. The initial scenes between Darcy and Glenn showed that there was "no love lost" between the two, with Glenn giving Darcy a warning. Kilkelly from Digital Spy speculated that Glenn may know Darcy's secrets and questioned whether he would want to "get rid" of Darcy. Prior to Glenn's reappearance, Tracey was killed off after she confronted her "enemy" Darcy with some unknown "incriminating" evidence, which had been given to Tracey by Darcy's own personal investigator. Tracey's death was not announced prior to the airing of the episode. Kilkelly noted that Tracey had not counted on "just how far Darcy would go to keep her secret".

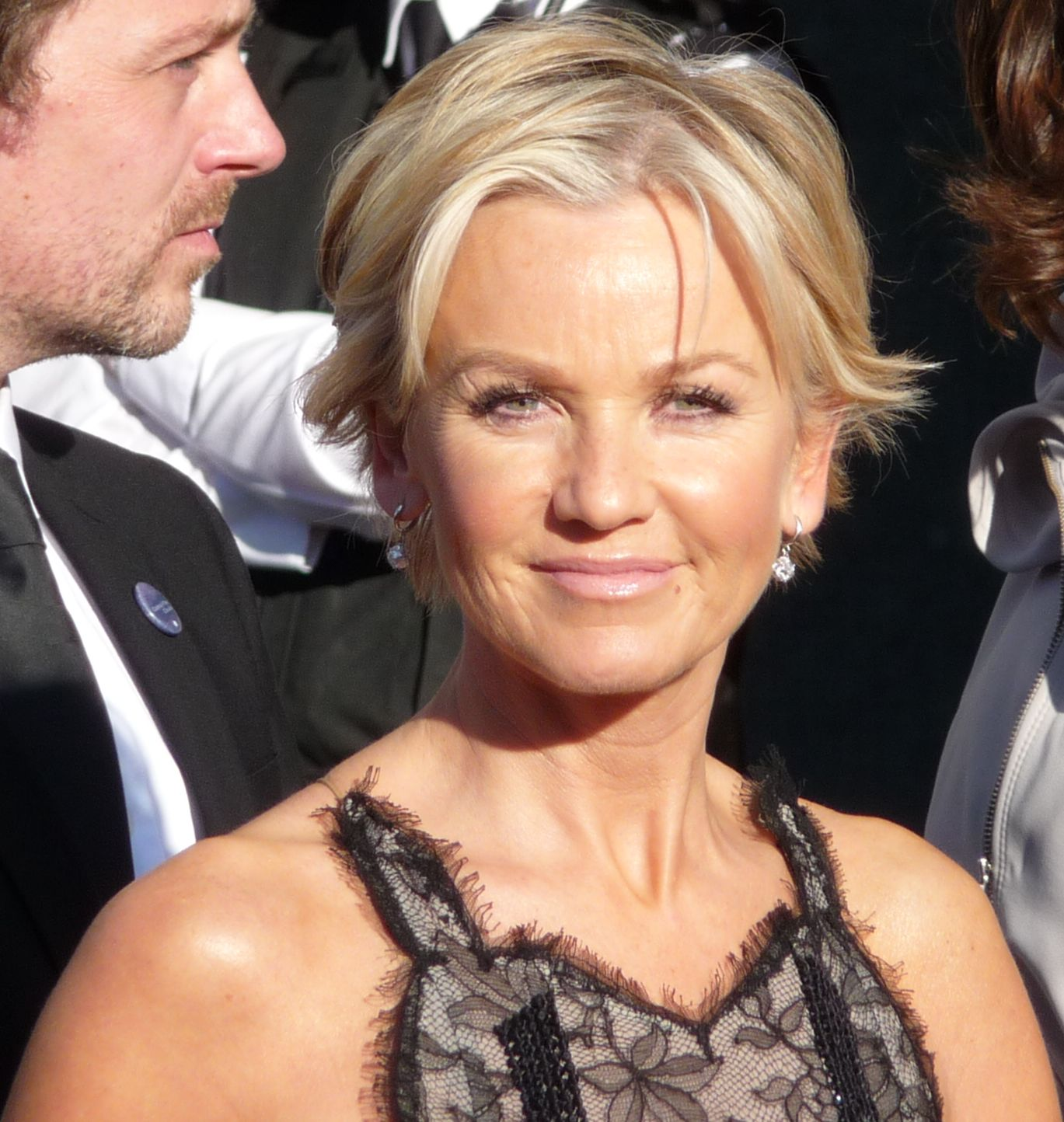
Lisa Maxwell portrayed Tracey, who Darcy accidentally kills.

Following Tracey's death, it becomes apparent that Darcy is hiding something. Darcy's secrets are revealed in October 2017, when it transpires that Tracey confronted Darcy at Lisa's Loveboat over the fact that Adam is not Toby's biological son. In flashback sequences, it is revealed that on the boat, Tracey showed Darcy that she had proof and ordered her to leave the village, which led to Darcy trying to fight her for the evidence and Tracey tripping into the water. It is also revealed that Darcy chose not to help her, instead deciding to protect her secret. Tracey's portrayer, Lisa Maxwell, told Digital Spy that she had enjoyed working with Jarrett-Gavin on the soap, and that she would continue watching Hollyoaks to see if Darcy gets her "comeuppance". Grace and Glenn want vengeance after they discover that Darcy was on the boat with Tracey when she died, which leads to Glenn trying to drive Darcy out of the village. However, Darcy then drops a bombshell on him when she reveals that he is the biological father of Toby, not Adam. Not wanting to cause further damage to his relationship with Jesse and Adam, Glenn decides to keep this a secret.

Darcy feels threatened when Maxine returns to the village, with Jarrett-Gavin explaining that "Darcy isn't happy, especially as Maxine's returned looking really hot. It has got her back up". Jarrett-Gavin also revealed that now that Darcy has "finally got what she wanted", she is worried that Maxine will "ruin it all". Sanderson, Maxine's portrayer, had previously hinted to Inside Soap that Darcy's secrets would be exposed. At a Singles event, Maxine ends up finding out about Toby's true paternity when she by chance meets with Jordan, the private investigator who knows about Darcy's secrets. Maxine tells Adam, who realises "just how badly Darcy has betrayed him", and he exposes Darcy during a Christmas meal with the rest of the Donovan family, which causes "jaws to drop all round" and leads to Adam turning his back on Darcy and Glenn trying to blackmail her to leave the village without Toby. A writer from Inside Soap called Darcy "lonely" due to being "exiled by her loved ones", whilst Jarrett-Gavin told the magazine that Darcy would have a "sad Christmas", as the character "had the family she wanted, and now it's gone!" However, Jarrett-Gavin had previously told Soaplife that even if Darcy's secrets were exposed, Darcy will still "do everything she can" in order to make sure that she and Toby are "living a good life", adding that Darcy "go anywhere until she's gone to the darkest point she can with her lies and manipulation. There's more to come!"

=== The Osborne family ===
Towards the end of 2017, Jarrett-Gavin revealed to Inside Soap that Darcy would be "getting involved with a new family". She did not reveal which Hoylloaks family it was, but teased that the family had been on the show for "a while" and that she had not worked with them before. The family was later revealed to be the Osbornes, which begins when Jack Osborne (Jimmy McKenna) takes Darcy in after taking pity on her. It had been announced that Darcy would not be departing the show after being exposed in front of the Donovans and that she would continue "scheming" in "for another big storyline". It was also reported that Tom Cunningham (Ellis Hollins), a member of family, could become Darcy's "next victim in a shock new storyline". The storyline began in a Hollyoaks hour-long special episode, which includes Darcy finding out that Tom has a "seven-figure trust fund", which causes Darcy's eyes to "light up" when she overhears him talking about it at his 18th birthday party. Darcy then tells Toby that they will be going on "the holiday of a lifetime", determined to keep the promise and use Tom's money to fund it. Jarrett-Gavin had previously told Soaplife that there was more to come, saying "Whatever secrets come out, Darcy will do everything she can to ensure that she and her son are living a good life. She won't go anywhere until she's gone to the darkest point she can with her lies and manipulation." Kerry Barrett from Entertainment Daily wrote that Darcy "thinks all her Christmases have come at once" when she finds out that Tom is a millionaire, and speculated whether Darcy would take a "seductive approach" to get her hands on the money, joking that Darcy thinks Tom is "very attractive once she discovers he's loaded!". Hollins told Inside Soap "Darcy knows this is her big break if she can make it work", and revealed that Tom is initially unaware that Darcy wants his money. Ellis added that he was unsure of how Tom would react if Darcy was to make a move on him, saying "I don't know if he'd squirm or jump in head first!". Darcy later tries to steal £20,000 from Tom and plans to flee the village with Toby and the money, but her "big plan" is busted by Tom and Jack, who had figured out her con and gave her Monopoly money instead, with Jack threatening her with prison.

=== Conning Jack Osborne ===
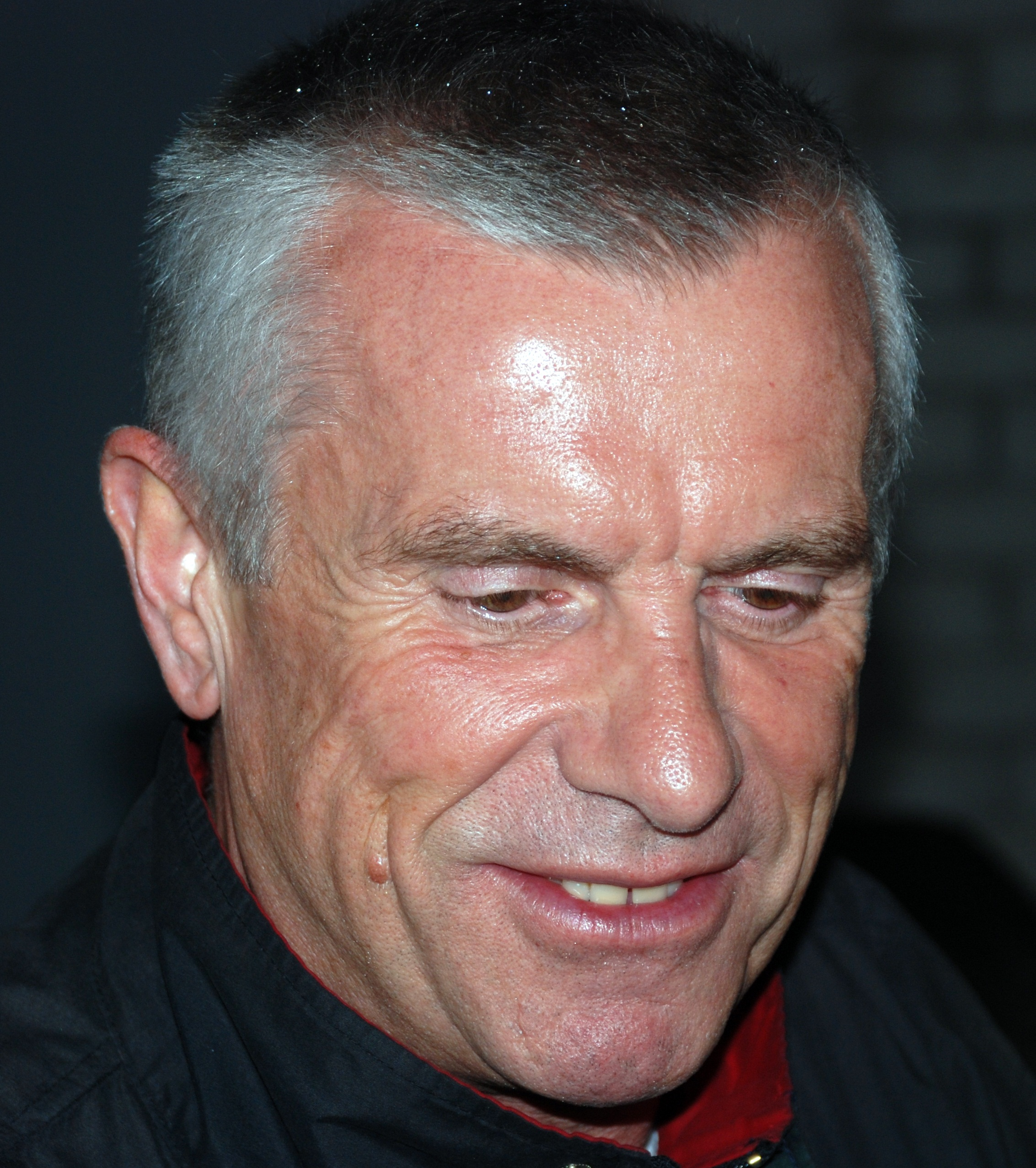
Jimmy Mckenna portrays Jack Osborne, whom Darcy attempts to marry for his money.

Darcy then sets her sights on Jack, worried about his loyalty to her disappearing following the scam, and surprises him in her underwear in an attempt to seduce him. However, the attempted seduction, which makes Jack "flustered", is interrupted by an angry Tom, who orders her to leave. Darcy apologises to Jack about her behaviour and he decides to let her stay with the Osbornes, which angers Tom, and Jack even "foolishly" defends Darcy when Adam attempts to have Darcy arrested for attempting to kidnap Toby. Daniel Kilkelly from Digital Spy noted that whilst fans were "cheering Jack on" when he thwarted Darcy's plan to steal Tom's money, he believed that Jack proved that "there's no fool like an old fool" by giving Darcy another chance.

Jack has a heart attack in front of Darcy and Toby after being exhausted from playing and running around with Toby, as he was trying to help Darcy. Darcy continues to attempt to seduce him and lies about liking fishing in order to spend more time with him, which makes Nancy suspicious, though Darcy is able to outsmart her, which leads to an argument between Darren and Jack over Darcy. Darcy then tricks Jack into thinking that they spent the night together and lies that he confessed his "undying love" for Darcy. Darcy is successful in tricking Jack into thinking that she has feelings for him, when in reality she is after his money. Darcy also plans attempts to spring a surprise wedding on him, with Tom Chapman from Digital Spy writing that Darcy is planning to "rinse Jack for all he's worth". Chapman noted that Darcy's "scheming", alongside other storylines, contributed to "an evening of conflict and cunning" for that episode.

The following month, Jack and Darcy face a "huge" backlash from family members Tom, Nancy Hayton (Jessica Fox), Darren Osborne (Ashley Taylor Dawson) and Esther Bloom (Jazmine Franks) when they tell them about their relationship, with the family not believing Darcy's claim that she is not after Jack's money. Digital Spy's Susannah Alexander wrote, "to say that nobody was pleased would be an understatement" regarding the reaction from the Osbornes. Fox revealed that there would be "fireworks" at the confession, explaining how Nancy "doesn't mince her words when it come to the relationship" due to not liking Darcy and believing that she is up to no good. After Darcy makes a speech about Jack being her soulmate, Jack breaks up with her, having spoken to Darren about how he still listens to a voicemail message from his recently deceased wife, Frankie Osborne (Helen Pearson). This leads a "secretly livid" Darcy to stoop to a "new low" when she secretly deletes Frankie's voicemail. Darcy then supports Jack, who is devastated when he realises the voicemail is gone, in the hopes of being able to move back in, which leads to Jack letting Darcy into his life again. This angers Esther, Frankie's granddaughter, and she ends up realising what Darcy has done after Toby tells her how Darcy had messed with Jack's phone and had wanted him to get over "that old woman". Eden-Olivia Lord from Closer Online speculated that Toby would cause Darcy's "downfall" due to revealing this to Esther.

"[Darcy] is very clever at uncovering other people's lies. Because she's so good at it herself, she will not be fooled so easily. She wants Jack and a stable happy life, so is determined not to let the girls ruin it. Adam is Darcy's first love, so she will always be in love with him, but she knows that ship has sailed and he would never come back to her. She's got to move on and Jack will be a perfect provider for her and Toby."

— Jarrett-Gavin on Darcy figuring out the plan to set her up (2018)

Esther, Nancy and Adam team up in order to expose Darcy, with the plan being that Adam will take his top off and "tempt" Darcy in order to show Jack that she is not loyal to him; however, Darcy is able to "turn the tables" when she notices the camera recording Adam flirting with her. Jarrett-Gavin commented that when Darcy realises she is being set up, she thinks "I can play that game too" and tries to seduce Adam in order to expose the girls' plans to Jack and prove that she is not "a bad person". The actress revealed that Darcy is afraid that the girls will figure out her plans and thus she is trying to outsmart them to prove to Jack that they are trying to split them up, adding that Darcy is "the master of manipulation and won't let them win". The actress also revealed that she was unsure of what Darcy's plans were if she ends getting Jack's money.

Jarrett-Gavin called working with McKenna "absolutely brilliant", calling him "funny" and kind to work with, and joked that she kept hearing that he was in the movie Highlander. The actress revealed that she was unsure whether Darcy would cause Jack any pain due to him being a "kind-hearted man". She believed that Jack was making Darcy "soften" and could lead to a change for the character, adding that Darcy "wants to be financially secure and that's the main thing, but Jack is pulling at her heart-strings more than she ever would have thought".

=== Attempted murder and departure ===
Darcy ends up marrying Jack, who is still oblivious to her true intentions of only, but her world "fall[s] apart" when Jack announces that he is able to receive a heart bypass. Sophie Dainty from Digital Spy called this one of "biggest twists yet" in the storyline. The news thwarts Darcy's plans, as she is only marrying Jack as she believes he is dying. With her plans to "fleece" Jack thrown into "disarray", Darcy takes "shock action" and attempts to poison Jack, but has a "change of heart" about harming her new husband. Jarrett-Gavin believed that Darcy's attempt to poison Jack was the worst thing that Darcy did due to it being "premeditated", noting that it was worse than "accidentally" killing Tracey. The actress claimed that despite Darcy changing her mind about the poisoning, it was nonetheless "calculated" and "evil", calling it a "dark moment".

Darcy's final scenes aired on 25 April 2018 on E4 and the following day on Channel 4, with it being announced after the episode being aired that Darcy had left the show. In the storyline, Darcy's "latest scheme" sees her attempt to poison Jack with tainted whiskey, but ends up accidentally spiking Esther when she drinks it instead, leading to Esther collapsing and being taken to hospital. Darcy admits this to Adam, who calls the police, leading to a "panicked" Darcy's "downfall" as she flees the village "in fear". Sophie Dainty from Digital Spy noted that it "really did seem that Darcy was about to get her comeuppance" until a "a twist in the closing moments" occurs, where Darcy blackmails Glenn - over his involvement in covering up her part in Tracey's death - into giving her money and then leaves with Toby in a cab.

Following the broadcast of Darcy's final scenes, Jarrett-Gavin appeared in a video on the official Hollyoaks YouTube channel, where she thanked fans for following her "incredible journey" and for "watching, supporting, hating, loving and enjoying the character". The actress noted that she would miss Nikki Sanderson and was sad that she would not be working with her anymore as they had had "a great time together", with a lot of "drama" happening on screen, with Jarrett-Gavin calling it "fun" and "bitchy". She also joked that she would not miss Maxine. The actress commented that working with Jimmy Essex and Jimmy McKenna was her "favourite" part of her experience on the show. She also said that she found it "really cool" that some fans loved Darcy.

== Storylines ==
Adam Donovan's (Jimmy Essex) girlfriend, Maxine Minniver (Nikki Sanderson), begins looking into what happened to Adam's ex-girlfriend, Darcy, who disappeared years prior during a holiday abroad. After getting evidence that she is alive, Maxine and Tracey Donovan (Lisa Maxwell), Adam's mother, eventually find Darcy working in a cafe under the name "Rebecca". After they confront her, Darcy tracks down Adam in Hollyoaks, who is shocked but happy to see her, and the two have an emotional reunion. After Adam chooses to stay with Maxine over Darcy, Darcy tells him that he has a responsibility to her and claims he is the father of her son, Toby Wilde (Lucas Haywood). Darcy tries to use Toby to break up Maxine and Adam, even getting him to ruin Maxine's wedding dress, though this does not stop the two from getting married, saddening Darcy. When Toby is rushed to hospital with breathing problems, Darcy's ex-boyfriend, Marcus (Dean Ashton), shows up, claiming to be Toby's biological father. He blackmails Darcy for £40,000, which she had stolen from him, and threatens to take Toby away to a better hospital. Darcy gets a DNA test which proves that Marcus is not the father and Adam pays Marcus the full £40,000.

Darcy continues trying to annoy Maxine and win Adam over. She begins a relationship with Adam's brother, Jesse Donovan (Luke Jerdy), who used to have an unhealthy infatuation with her and whom she had sex with prior to disappearing. In order to get closer to the family and win over Adam, Darcy accepts Jesse's marriage proposal. The two become engaged, infuriating Tracey and Adam. Adam then confesses to Darcy that he still loves her and they become a couple again, devastating Maxine and Jesse. Darcy is later seen meeting a mysterious man, who is revealed to be Glenn Donovan (Neil Roberts/Bob Cryer), Adam and Jesse's father. One night, a drunken Tracey confronts Darcy at the loveboat, revealing that she has evidence that Adam is not Toby's biological father. A desperate Darcy tries to stop Tracey from telling Adam the truth, which results in Tracey falling into the river and drowning. Darcy is not linked to the crime due to the amount of alcohol found in Tracey's system, leading to her death being ruled as accidental. It is later revealed that Glenn is the true father of Toby. When Adam finds out, he exposes her at a family dinner and kicks her out of his home.

Jack Osborne (Jimmy McKenna), who is grieving over his recently deceased wife Frankie (Helen Pearson), takes pity on Darcy and allows her to move into his home, which annoys his family. When Darcy finds out that Jack's foster son, Tom Cunningham (Ellis Hollins), has a seven-figure trust fund, Darcy plans to con him and flee the village with the money and Toby, but she is thwarted by Jack and Tom. After Jacks gives Darcy a second chance, she plans to marry him in an attempt to inherit his money, thinking that he is dying. When Jack is sleeping following his recovery from a heart attack, Darcy sneaks into his bed and lies to Jack, telling him that they spent the night together and that he admitted his love for her. They later start a relationship, which infuriates Jack's family. Esther Bloom (Jazmine Franks) and Nancy Hayton (Jessica Fox) attempt to expose Darcy by having Adam seduce her on camera, but Darcy is able to thwart them and exposes their trick to Jack. Darcy and Jack marry, but when she realises that Jack is not dying after all, she attempts to poison him. Darcy changes her mind but the poisoned drink is drunk by Esther, which puts her in hospital. Fearing repercussions for her crimes, Darcy flees Hollyoaks with Toby with her help of Glenn, who she blackmailed with the fact that he helped cover up Tracey's death.

== Reception ==
Prior to Darcy's first appearance, Kyle O'Sullivan from Liverpool Echo cited Darcy being alive as one of the "huge" storylines set to "explode" in soap operas. Duncan Lindsay from Metro reported how fans were "gripped" over "mystery surrounding Adam Donovan's missing fiancee". Later, when reporting Darcy's downfall following the reveal of Toby's paternity, Lindsay wrote that fans would "no doubt be cheering that Darcy is about to be caught out" and wrote that Darcy "needed bringing down a peg or two for some time", believing that Maxine was the best character to do so. A writer from the Irish Independent called Darcy one of the "calculating bitches" that Jarret-Gavin had portrayed. In April 2017, Laura Heffernan from Inside Soap wrote that "Darcy and Adam's chemistry sets a high benchmark". Heffernan later wrote that Maxine would be a "fool" to trust Darcy after "everything she's done", and joked that Toby's Teddy bear had to "look away from Darcy's latest machinations". After it was revealed that Glenn is Toby's father, Heffernan wrote that she hoped that Maxine would be the one to "finish Darcy off in the end".

Beth Allcock from OK! called Darcy a "gold-digger" and reported how fans found Darcy and Jack's relationship "disgusting" and "gross" and that fans reacted "strongly" to the storyline. Actress Jessica Fox, who portrays Nancy, also shared this view over the relationship. Tom Chapman from Digital Spy noted how fans felt sorry for Jack when Darcy schemed to take his money and joked that Darcy "remains as popular as ever". Susannah Alexander from the same website also called Darcy "devious", and noted that viewers could not "get enough" of Darcy's "downfall" and "couldn't have been any happier to see the back of Darcy". Sophie Dainty from Digital Spy referred the character as "villainous" and wrote that it was unfortunate that the character "got away with everything". Whilst reviewing 2017 in Hollyoaks, Dainty's colleague, Daniel Kilkelly, wrote that "on reflection, it probably would have been better to leave the situation well alone!" in regards to Maxine initially tracking Darcy down earlier in the year. Kilkelly also blamed Darcy for ruining Maxine and Adam's happy marriage. Hayley Minn from The Daily Mirror commented on how viewers were "fully aware of how conniving and secretive" the character is.

When Darcy's scheme to swindle Tom of money failed, Kilkelly wrote that fans "can breathe a sigh of relief" due to "devious" Darcy being caught out again. Kilkelly also called Darcy's plan "evil". Their colleague, Susannah Alexander, reported how fans were "absolutely fuming" when Darcy deleted Jack's "precious" voicemail from Frankie. In 2023, Stephen Patterson from Metro noted how Jack was "famously conned" by Darcy, writing that she "preyed" on Jack's grief and plotted to marry and kill him to take his money. Kilkelly also called Darcy a "cunning" and "ruthless" character and believed that Darcy killing Tracey was a "callous move".

Fans expressed their delight on Twitter over Darcy's departure. Jarrett-Gavin noted that some fans "hated" the character, which she believed was good as it meant that she had completed her job "right". Speaking about Darcy's and Jack potential wedding, Stephanie Chase from Digital Spy wrote that it was "safe to say Hollyoaks fans won't be rushing out to buy a hat [for the wedding], as everyone is truly fed up with Jack not being able to see through Darcy" and called them a "May–December couple". Following Tracey's death, Katy Brent from Entertainment Daily reported on how many fans were "convinced" that Darcy was responsible. The scene where Adam exposes the fact that Glenn is Toby's father and that Darcy lied was featured in Hollyoaks' Most Shocking Caught Out Moments compilation. Regarding Darcy's Christmas downfall, Kilkelly wrote "At last!" Kilkelly had previously written that fans would be "cheering" Maxine on to "destroy Darcy for good".

== See also ==
- List of soap opera villains
