= British Independent Film Awards 2015 =

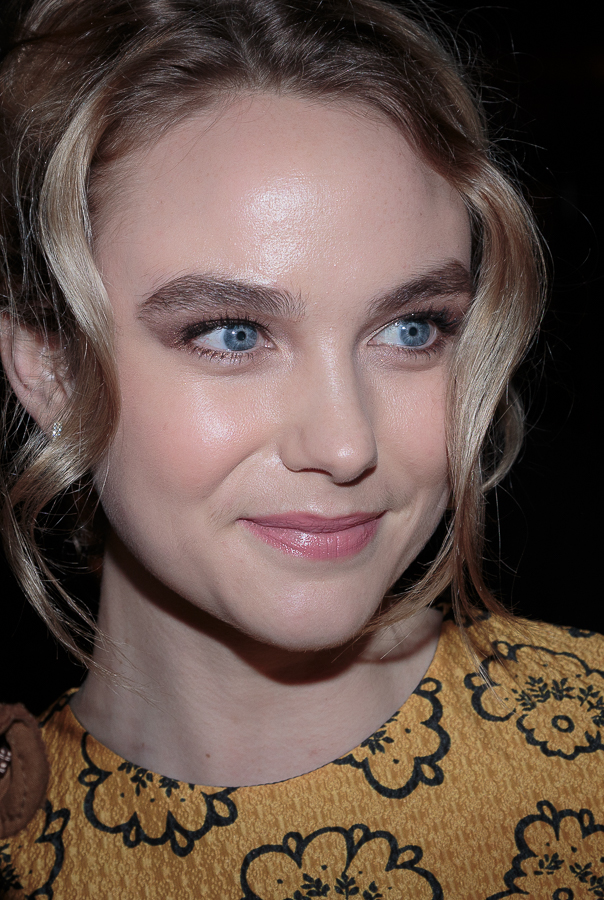
Johanna Vanderham in attendance at the BIFA 2015

The 18th British Independent Film Awards nominations were announced on 3 November 2015.

== Awards ==
=== Best British Independent Film ===
- Ex Machina
- 45 Years
- Amy
- The Lobster
- Macbeth

=== Best Director ===
- Alex Garland - Ex Machina
- Andrew Haigh - 45 Years
- Asif Kapadia - Amy
- Yorgos Lanthimos - The Lobster
- Justin Kurzel - Macbeth

=== Best Actress ===
- Saoirse Ronan - Brooklyn
- Marion Cotillard - Macbeth
- Carey Mulligan - Suffragette
- Charlotte Rampling - 45 Years
- Alicia Vikander - The Danish Girl

=== Best Actor ===
- Tom Hardy - Legend
- Tom Courtenay - 45 Years
- Colin Farrell - The Lobster
- Michael Fassbender - Macbeth
- Tom Hiddleston - High-Rise

=== Best Supporting Actress ===
- Olivia Colman - The Lobster
- Helena Bonham Carter - Suffragette
- Anne-Marie Duff - Suffragette
- Sienna Miller - High-Rise
- Julie Walters - Brooklyn

=== Best Supporting Actor ===
- Brendan Gleeson - Suffragette
- Luke Evans - High-Rise
- Domhnall Gleeson - Brooklyn
- Sean Harris - Macbeth
- Ben Whishaw - The Lobster

=== Most Promising Newcomer ===
- Abigail Hardingham - Nina Forever
- Agyness Deyn - Sunset Song
- Mia Goth - The Survivalist
- Milo Parker - Mr. Holmes
- Bel Powley - A Royal Night Out

=== The Douglas Hickox Award ===
- The Survivalist - Stephen Fingleton
- The Hallow - Corin Hardy
- Kajaki: The True Story - Paul Katis
- Nina Forever - Chris & Ben Blaine
- Slow West - John Maclean

=== Best Screenplay ===
- Ex Machina - Alex Garland
- 45 Years - Andrew Haigh
- Brooklyn - Nick Hornby
- High-Rise - Amy Jump
- The Lobster - Yorgos Lanthimos, Efthymis Filippou

=== Best Achievement in Production ===
- Paul Kattis, Andrew De Lotbiniere - Kajaki: The True Story
- Triston Goligher - 45 Years
- James Gay-Rees - Amy
- Ceci Dempsey, Ed Guiney, Yorgos Lanthimos, Lee Magiday - The Lobster
- David A Hughes, David Moores - The Violators

=== Best Technical Achievement ===
- Andrew Whitehurst, Visual Effects - Ex Machina
- Adam Arkapaw, Cinematography - Macbeth
- Mark Digby, Production Design - Ex Machina
- Chris King, Editing - Amy
- Fiona Weir, Casting - Brooklyn

=== Best Documentary ===
- Dark Horse: The Incredible True Story of Dream Alliance - Judith Dawson, Louise Osmond
- Amy - James Gay-Rees, Asif Kapadia
- How To Change The World - Bous De Jong, Al Morrow, Jerry Rothwell
- Palio - James Gay-Rees, John Hunt, Cosima Spender
- A Syrian Love Story - Elhum Shakerifar, Sean McAllister

=== Best Foreign Independent Film ===
- Room - Ed Guiney, David Gross, Emma Donoghue, Lenny Abrahamson
- Carol - Elizabeth Karlsen, Stephen Woolley, Christine Vachon, Phyllis Nagy, Todd Haynes
- Force Majeure - Erik Hemmendorff, Marie Kjellson, Philippe Bober, Ruben Östlund
- Girlhood - Bénédicte Couvreur, Céline Sciamma
- Son of Saul - Gábor Sipos, Gábor Rajna, Cara Royer, László Nemes

=== Discovery Award ===
- Orion: The Man Who Would Be King
- Aaaaaaaah!
- Burn Burn Burn
- The Return
- Winter
