= Osborne family =

UK soap opera characters, created 1996

- Hollyoaks family
- First appearance: January 1996
- Created by: Phil Redmond
- Introduced by: Phil Redmond
- Duration: 1996–present

The Osborne family are a fictional family in the long-running Channel 4 soap opera, Hollyoaks. Introduced to the show in 1996, The family moved to Hollyoaks village in 1996, although Ruth Osborne had previously lived in the Village. The characters have been involved in storylines such as dealing with a Gambling addiction, Ruth relationship with Kurt Benson, Jack's affair with Dawn Cunningham, a fake death scam for insurance money, financial troubles, Jack three marriages and fostering a child. Throughout their tenure on the serial, the Osbornes have owned the Dog in the Pond. Hollyoaks″ official website has described the Osborne family as belonging in the Dog in the Pond and as being the " rightfully at the helm" of the public house.

The current Osborne family consists of patriarch Jack Osborne (Jimmy McKenna), his son Darren Osborne (Ashley Taylor Dawson), Darren and Suzanne’s (Suzanne Hall) daughter Frankie Osborne (Isabelle Smith) and Darren and Nancy's children Oscar and Morgan. Additionally, several others may be considered Osbornes through marriage; Nancy (Jessica Fox) and Charlie Dean (Charlie Behan). Tom Cunningham (Ellis Hollins) and Brooke Hathaway (Tylan Grant) have been adopted by the family.

== History ==
The Osborne family were created in 1996 by Phil Redmond as an expansion to Ruth Osborne's family who had lived as a student in Hollyoaks Village. Jack Osborne and his wife Celia Osborne arrived with their son Darren Osborne on 18 November 1996 and soon after bought The Dog in the Pond from Celia's brother Greg Andersen. Celia and Jack met at a young age and married when they were both twenty. Jack and Celia had two children together, first having Ruth then in 1983 having Darren. The pair remained together until 1997 when they split after 23 years of marriage, after Celia discovered Jack had cheated on her. Celia left and took Darren with her. Darren rejoined the family 2 years later. Ruth married Kurt Benson in 1997 and later divorced him in 1999 before he died soon after. Jack remarried a year after his split from Celia, this time to Jill Patrick and they remained together until her untimely demise because of a brain tumor a year later. In 2003 Jack's Niece Natalie Osborne moved to Hollyoaks village then later her sister, Rachel Osborne joined her in 2004, before both leaving later that year. Five years since his last marriage Jack remarried this time to Frankie Dean. In 2009 Darren married Hannah Ashworth while drunk and the pair later made an attempt at marriage before splitting. Darren Osborne impregnated Suzanne Ashworth and she later gave birth to twins which they named Jack and Francine Osborne. The Osborne family are the longest serving owners and Jack the longest serving landlord of The Dog in the Pond serving for 12 years.

== In Hollyoaks ==
Ruth arrived as a student and began to date Kurt Benson. The Osbornes arrive in Hollyoaks, where they join Ruth. Jack and Celia become the landlords of The Dog in the Pond, after Celia's brother Greg decides to sell up following the death of his daughter Natasha. Jack is revealed to be the father of teenager Dawn Cunningham's child Bethany, who needs a kidney transplant. Jack donates one of his kidneys to the daughter he has never known. Dawn's sister Jude ends up telling everyone in The Dog about his secret child. Celia leaves for America taking Darren with her. Celia and Jack later divorce. Darren eventually returns 2 years later.

Ruth starts getting hassle from Spike who tried to entrap her, but Kurt intervened and accidentally pushed Spike off scaffolding. Kurt was later charged. Kurt became paranoid that Ruth thought he was guilty, leading them to break up. Kurt left for Hull so Ruth followed him and they got married. Spike trapped Ruth in a room and tried to force himself on her, but Rob Hawthorne stepped in to rescue her.

Jack and Jill Patrick begin a relationship, eventually getting married. Jill reveals she has a fatal brain tumour. Jill eventually dies and Jack promised to look after her children. Ruth learned that Kurt was having an affair with Kate Patrick, ending their marriage. Ruth and Kate fought which led to Kate trying to drown her. In a fit of rage, Kurt intervened, trying to teach Kate a lesson by drowning her. Ruth and Kurt realise that they were not right for each other, prompting Kurt to leave Hollyoaks. Some time later Ruth was told that Kurt had died.

Follow by the separation of Kurt, Ruth began a relationship with Lewis Richardson, but they both agreed to keep their relationship a secret. Ruth took a break from her relationship with Lewis and met Luke Morgan who seduced her which led Lewis to end their relationship. Ruth decided to move to the states, but Lewis arrived at the airport in time to stop her leaving, in which he succeeded. Ruth found out that she was pregnant and without telling Lewis, had an abortion. Ruth and Lewis finally broke up after he slept with Lorraine Wilson. In Hollyoaks: Movin' On, Lewis beat-up Ruth before trying to force himself on her, before leaving Ruth for dead. Ruth while in hospital received news Lewis had died after committing suicide. Ruth left Hollyoaks for a new life in London.

In 2003, Natalie Osborne, Jack's troubled niece, arrived from Scotland for the half-term after her parents have marital trouble. Natalie starts at Hollyoaks High School. However, her older sister Rachel arrives and tells Jack that Natalie is hiding the fact she has been underachieving in School. Jack sends her back home. Scott decided to teach Darren a lesson for scamming him by locking the doors of The Loft and setting fire to it. Scott fell down the stairs of The Loft and pleaded to Darren for help, but Darren left Scott for dead. No trace of Scott was found and a year later, Scott started threatening Darren to pay back the money he had scammed off him. Darren pleaded with Scott not to kill him. Scott was about to attack Darren when the police arrived and arrested him.

After five years being a widowed, since the death of Jill, Jack begins a relationship with Frankie Dean after the collapse of her marriage to Johnno, and the pair later marry. Jack and Frankie decide to foster a child. They foster Barry Newton. Darren develops an addiction to gambling. Jack gives Darren half of the Dog in recognition of his maturity. During a game of poker with Warren Fox, he bets his half of The Dog, which Warren wins. After finding this out, Jack suffers a heart attack and Darren is told to leave the house. Jack, Frankie, Newt and Louise are held hostage at The pub. Outside, Darren fights with the police to try to get inside to save his father. Darren is shot by one of the hostage takers while trying to save his family, but he recovered. Warren then signs his half of The Dog over to Jack again for a low price. Despite this low price, the family go through financial difficulties, and Jack begins watering down drinks. Seeing no other way, Jack decides to commit suicide so his family can claim his life insurance money. However, Darren stops him. They then discover the body of Eamon Fisher. Darren tells Jack that they could fake his death, claiming Jack is the deceased body. Jack goes along with this and his family are horrified at his apparent death. Ruth returns briefly for his funeral. Frankie discovers Jack is alive and the pair agree to flee to Spain. Niall Rafferty is planning to kill his family so Jack and Darren as the pair rush to find them. Jack bursts in and tells Niall it is over, however Niall detonates explosives, which eventually kills Tina Reilly. Jack is then arrested and Darren admits he knew of the fake death. They are both imprisoned. During his time in prison, the Osbornes are forced to sell The Dog to the Ashworths.

Jack and Darren are released from prison four months later. Jack visits Eamon's sons, Kris and Malachy Fisher, where he learns that Darren had only offered to buy them a drink as an apology. Darren is then kicked out of the flat. Jack grows depressed, and he does not want to leave the house. After learning that Darren took £100,000 from Warren Fox to get stepbrother Jake to confess to Sean Kennedy's murder, before gambling the money away, Jack disowns him. Jack gets a manager job in the Dog thanks to Darren. When Jack sees that Darren has become close friends with teenager Duncan Button, he realises that he has changed, so decides to reconcile with him and offers him to move in with him, which would also include Duncan. Darren is delighted and happily accepts.

Darren and Hannah go on a rock 'n' roll weekend in Denmark. Darren breaks the news that he and Hannah married while drunk. Darren then uses his marital status to convince Nev to give him a job at The Dog as a barman and cancels the annulment as a means to get The Dog back. When Hannah goes to Darren's flat to watch a film, the pair end up sleeping together. Darren later ends his relationship with Hannah. While trying to save his wife Darren was stabbed from Jamie, after the couple run away. Darren offers to leave Hollyoaks with Hannah however she rejects his offer and leaves Hollyoaks alone. After Hannah's departure Darren, at Carmel and Calvin Valentine's wedding, Suzanne Ashworth arrives and spends the day flirting with Darren. They later sneak off and have sex. They resume their brief affair but are caught by Suzanne's son Rhys. Rhys attacks Darren before telling Neville about the affair, who kicks Suzanne out of their home.

The family supports Frankie and Steph when Steph reveals she is dying from cervical cancer. When Steph dies in a fire at Il Gnosh, they become deeply concerned for Frankie when she sets a table for Steph for Christmas dinner. On Christmas Eve, while taking the dog for a walk Jack and Duncan, discover India Longford's body.

In January 2011, the Osbornes have an intruder who Tom hits over the head, and it is later revealed that the intruder is in fact Frankie's granddaughter. The intruders father was Frankies son, born when she was 16, yet Frankie thought he had died. It is later revealed that Frankie's parents had told her the tot had died, but they then put him up for adoption. The family allow Esther Bloom to live with her. Darren begins a relationship with Nancy Hayton but it is cut short when In early 2011, Darren's ex-lover Suzanne returns, and announces that she's heavily pregnant with Darren's twins. She gives birth to on 21 January 2011 to Francine and Jack Osborne. Suzanne and the twins move into Nancy's flat, which leads Nancy to end their relationship. Suzanne leaves the village and while Nancy begins to console Darren, they reconcile. Darren and Nancy get married. Nancy finds out she pregnant but Nancy suffers a miscarriage. Nancy later discovers she is again pregnant with Darren's child. in October their son Oscar Osborne is born three months premature. Oscar is rushed to the neonatal intensive care unit following his birth and the doctors inform Darren and Nancy that their son may have brain damage and he may be disabled and he may be deaf and that he is fighting a serious infection he developed, necrotizing enterocolitis.[75] The family hold a christening and Darren and Nancy decide to name their son Oscar. in December, Darren and Nancy bring Oscar home for Christmas and have trouble settling him when he is crying. Darren drops a vase near Oscar who is sleeping. Oscar does not wake, causing Darren and Nancy concern. They consult the hospital who reveal that initial tests were inconclusive and further testing has revealed that Oscar is not responding to sound and is deaf. Oscar's deafness causes tension between Darren and Frankie, who fight, leading to Darren's walking out. Darren spends the day contemplating how Oscar would be affected by his deafness and begins learning sign language and buys specialist toys to support Oscar. Darren and Nancy think of getting cochlear implants for Oscar so he can hear but Nancy is put off by the operation. Despite this, Nancy eventually allows the operation to take place and in February 2014, Oscar has the operation and it is successful.

As of October 2015, the Osbornes are no longer the owners of the Dog in the Pond after an incident at Hollyoaks Pride (an event they were hosting on behalf of Tony Hutchinson) lead to the death of Doctor Charles S'Avage who, unbeknownst to the characters, was actually murdered by the Gloved Hand Killer (Lindsey Butterfield). Tony later tells Diane O'Connor that Jack could be potentially liable for the accident. Jack then reveals to Darren that he has sold the pub. The family then move into 17 Basswood Road, which had been formerly used for student accommodation. In 2016, Jack visits his brother, Billy Brodie in Prison and that Jack and Billy was involved in a murder. Billy beats Callum up and forced his brother, Jack to do the same. However, Jack's blows proved to be fatal and he ended up killing Callum. In December 2016, Jack had flashbacks to killing Callum and confessed to Darren.

Darren had a brief marriage to Mandy Richardson in 2021 but the marriage stopped after Mandy’s lies. In 2022, Nancy gives birth to her and Darren’s daughter Morgan Osborne who is named after Luke Morgan (Gary Lucy) and Darren and Nancy get married for the third time. In January 2024, Hannah turns up with Darren’s long lost Twins, JJ and Frankie. Shortly after, Suzanne turns up at Darren and Nancy’s, asking questions about them turning up in Hollyoaks and that she demands them to come home. Hannah leaves after being threatened by Carter Shepherd as she was going to expose his and John Paul’s relationship and was given £50,000 out of Myra and Goldie’s Money. Suzanne, JJ and Frankie then live with Darren, Nancy and Jack.

Shortly moving in the Osborne’s, Frankie starts having trauma’s from her past and starts to lash out at her friends and family. Jack offers her to dance with him but when Jack touches her back, She gets scared and starts having trauma’s. She then tells Darren and Nancy. Frankie and Nancy reports it to the police and the police turn up at the Osborne’s and Zoe arrests Jack. Jack admits his innocence and Darren think something suspicious is going on. Jack is let out and decides to move out and is offered a place at The Dog In The Pond with Tony and Diane. When Charlie is back from London, Jack tells Charlie what has been going on and Charlie kicks off at Darren for not trusting Jack. She strikes a bond with Lucas. A few weeks later, Jack comes home, Scaring Frankie, Saying if Jack comes home, She would go, Frankie then lashes out as she can’t except the fact that Jack is Home and Darren says that they got to be a Family. It is then revealed that JJ used to sexually abuse her when they were younger when he touches her. Later in the time Jump (moved on to 1 year), JJ becomes ill, much to Frankie’s dismay and it is revealed that JJ has Leukaemia. He asked Frankie for help and she later accepts her help, only to see JJ suffer once he’s better. Once he’s better he gets a 2 Year Prison sentence for sexually abusing Frankie. Later in the year, Frankie, Dillon Ray and Vicky Grant are kidnapped by Grace Black and Claire Devine. Whilst this happens, Darren also finds out that Morgan isn’t his biological daughter and found out that Tony Hutchinson was the father of Morgan. This causes arguments between Darren and Nancy. Darren falls out with Tony and attempts to kill him but revealed that it was in fact Mercedes McQueen who shot him. Darren was then blamed for shotting Tony and was arrested for attempted murder. Once he’s released, he forgives Tony. Frankie is stalked after seeing text messages from an unknown anonymous who is trying to be JJ, who is now dead after being beaten up in Prison, planned by Conner “Sully” Sullivan. Frankie suspects that Sully was stalking her which her and Dodger Savage planned a screen recording so that Dodger could hear what Sully would say to Frankie. Darren finds out the truth and tells Frankie to stay away from Sully. It is then revealed on Christmas 2025 that it was Dee Dee Hutchinson who was stalking Frankie. It was also revealed that JJ had a relationship with Dee Dee prior to his prison sentence and his death.

== Generations ==
- Aggie Osborne (deceased), mother of Jack, Kenneth and Billy
  - Billy Brodie (deceased), half-brother of Jack and Kenneth
    - Eva Falco (deceased), daughter of Billy
  - Jack Osborne, brother of Kenneth and half-brother of Billy, married Celia Andersen; Jill Patrick; Frankie Dean (deceased); Darcy Wilde
    - Ruth Osborne, daughter of Jack and Celia, married Kurt Benson
    - Darren Osborne, son of Jack and Sandy Roscoe, married Hannah Ashworth; Nancy Hayton
      - Frankie Osborne, daughter of Darren and Suzanne Ashworth
      - JJ Osborne, son of Darren and Suzanne
      - Oscar Osborne, son of Darren and Nancy
      - Morgan Osborne, daughter of Darren and Nancy
    - Bethany Cunningham, daughter of Jack and Dawn Cunningham (deceased), married Jonah Keane
  - Kenneth Osborne, brother of Jack and half-brother of Billy, married Amanda Osborne
    - Natalie Osborne, daughter of Kenneth and Amanda
    - Rachel Osborne, daughter of Kenneth and Amanda

== Reception ==
Bryan Kirkwood said "I love Jack and Frankie – they're essentially the heart of the show". Ashley Taylor Dawson has been nominated for his portrayal as part of the Osborne family at Inside Soap Awards including Funniest Performance in 2007, Best Actor in 2009 and for three awards in 2010 including Best Actor, Funniest Performance and Sexiest Male. Temporary workplace provider Regus carried out a survey in 2010 and found that Jack Osborne was the third most popular boss from Soaps.

The Osborne family was longlisted for "Best family" at the 2024 Inside Soap Awards. They were longlisted for the same award at the 2025 Inside Soap Awards.
