= Freak (web series) =

- Official logo
- Genre: Teen drama
- Created by: Josie Ward
- Written by: Josie Ward; Joe Barton; Tyrone Meadows; Kim Jones; Mark Levin
- Directed by: Clair Breton
- Starring: Georgina Campbell; Jamie Di Spirito; Sean Bourke; Aisling Jarrett-Gavin; Daniel Ormerod; Abi Hardingham
- Country of origin: United Kingdom
- No. of seasons: 1
- No. of episodes: 16

Production
- Executive producer: Richard Vargas
- Producer: Damien Marchi
- Production company: FremantleMedia

Original release
- Network: Myspace
- Release: July 20 – September 10, 2009

Freak is an online teen drama series, created by Josie Ward, and produced by production company FMX (part of the FremantleMedia group). The series, which was described as an "edgy, teenage coming-of-age story", featured a cast of fresh, young actors and invited the audience to be part of the creative process by choosing the music, becoming a member of the cast and helping to shape the storyline.

The series was sponsored by Red Bull and Procter & Gamble and was launched on July 20, 2009.

== Synopsis ==
Freak follows Lucy, an online gaming addict who dresses in clothes she steals from her reluctant stepbrother Ant (Sean Bourke) until she begins to realise that her gaming obsession has started to turn her into a boy. Lucy's online friends offer advice on how to become the perfect girl and as Lucy starts to discover who she really is, she finds herself getting attention from indie kid Steve (Jamie Di Spirito) and geeky Dennis (Daniel Ormerod), receiving bad advice from Dennis' cruel fashionista sister Heather (Abi Hardingham) and stepping on the toes of Steve‟s girlfriend Kelly (Aisling Jarret). But does she even like the girl they created?

== Main characters ==
- Georgina Campbell as Lucy (gameonluce)
- Jamie Di Spirito as Steve (stevedylan)
- Sean Bourke as Ant (antagonise)
- Aisling Jarrett-Gavin as Kelly (Kelly_Humphrey)
- Daniel Ormerod as Dennis (superdenmatthews)
- Abi Hardingham as Heather (xxheathermatthewsxx)

== Interactivity ==
Episodes originally broadcast every Monday and Thursday.

The MySpace community were also invited to take part in the creative process behind the series. MySpace users could get involved in many ways such as submitting music to be featured on the soundtrack or by competing to become a stylist, showing off their freaky talents or starring as an extra within the series.

Natalie Fox became a Freak Stylist and won the opportunity to visit the set, meet the cast and the professional stylists behind the series.

== Soundtrack ==
The soundtrack to Freak has featured a mixture of popular signed and unsigned artists drawn from the MySpace Community. Some of the most popular artists to date have included Life in Film, Charlee Drew, Face for Radio, Rochelle, Milkymee, My Toys Like Me, We Have Band, Come On Gang, My Passion and the Electric Dolls.

== Reception ==
Freak has been praised for being shot in High-Definition and for making use of its London location. The Guardian's Sarah Hughes warmly received it as "a genuinely involving teen soap" describing it as "Skins with less desire to shock, or Hollyoaks with a heart."
