= Nina Forever =

- Theatrical release poster
- Directed by: Ben Blaine; Chris Blaine
- Written by: Ben Blaine; Chris Blaine
- Produced by: Cassandra Sigsgaard
- Starring: Fiona O'Shaughnessy; Abigail Hardingham; Cian Barry; Elizabeth Elvin; David Troughton
- Cinematography: Oliver Russell
- Edited by: Ben Blaine; Chris Blaine
- Music by: Dan Teper
- Production companies: Charlie Productions; Jeva Films
- Distributed by: StudioCanal
- Release date: 14 March 2015 (SXSW)
- Running time: 98 minutes
- Country: United Kingdom
- Language: English
- Box office: $10,815 (UK)

Nina Forever is a 2015 British horror comedy film written and directed by brothers Ben and Chris Blaine. It stars Fiona O'Shaughnessy, Abigail Hardingham, and Cian Barry. It premiered at the 2015 SXSW film festival. Fiona O'Shaughnessy plays Nina, a revenant who comes back to life to torment her ex-boyfriend and his new girlfriend whenever they have sex.

== Plot ==
After his girlfriend Nina dies in a car crash, Rob unsuccessfully attempts suicide. As he begins to overcome his grief, he falls in love with a coworker, Holly. Their relationship is complicated when Nina, unable to find rest in the afterlife, comes back to life to sarcastically torment them whenever they have sex. Rob and Holly must find some way to deal with the situation and put Nina to rest.

== Cast ==
- Fiona O'Shaughnessy as Nina
- Abigail Hardingham as Holly
- Cian Barry as Rob
- Elizabeth Elvin as Sally
- David Troughton as Dan

== Production ==
The writer-directors wanted to keep the film from descending into camp, so they kept the tone serious enough that people could still relate to the characters and their actions despite the situations. Focus was also put on keeping the metaphor of baggage in a relationship relatable beyond the literal interpretation of supernatural events. Production began in May 2013 in the UK. The Blaine brothers used a Kickstarter campaign to fund aspects of the film. They said that they did not want to ask permission to make a film; instead, they made the film they wanted and invited others to become involved in the process.

== Release ==
Nina Forever premiered at SXSW on 14 March 2015. It was released via video on demand in the United Kingdom on 15 February 2016, followed by a DVD and Blu-ray release on 22 February.

== Reception ==
Rotten Tomatoes reports that 97% of 32 surveyed critics gave the film a positive review; the average rating is 8/10 with the consensus stating, "Nina Forever tests the limit of the rom-com with a decidedly unorthodox triangle that's as diabolically original as it is daringly dark". Metacritic rated it 75/100 based on 10 reviews. Wayne Alan Brenner of The Austin Chronicle called it "a deftly unnerving collaboration between Lorrie Moore and Clive Barker". Patrick Cooper of Bloody Disgusting rated it 3.5/5 stars and wrote, "The Blaine brothers do a superb job of balancing the absurdity of a corpse that's summoned every time they have sex and the tough themes like grief and the possible impossibility of closure." Drew Tinnin of Dread Central rated it 4/5 stars and wrote, "Always slowly developing just enough to stay interesting, Nina Forever strikes a fairly unique balance in tone, never winking and becoming too ridiculous given the circumstances while also dealing with loss in a very genuine way." William Bibbiani of CraveOnline rated it 9/10 stars and wrote, "It's a unique exploration of horror, love and loss. It's a sexy, funny, morbid and beautiful film for horror lovers with a heart, and romantic audiences with a dark side." Oktay Ege Kozak of Indiewire rated it B+ and wrote the film would have been an excellent short but is overlong and episodic as a feature. Commenting on the film's nudity, Kozak wrote, "Yet the brothers' goal is far from empty titillation, as they construct an original and surprisingly tender romance." Michael Rechtshaffen of the Los Angeles Times compared it to Dona Flor and Her Two Husbands and said it "emerges as a diabolically effective anti-date movie".

At the British Independent Film Awards 2015, the Blaine brothers were nominated for Best Debut Director, and Abigail Hardingham won Best Newcomer.
