= Fiona O'Shaughnessy =

Irish actress

- Born: 1974 (age 51–52); Galway, Ireland
- Occupation: Actress
- Years active: 1999–present

Fiona O'Shaughnessy is an Irish film, stage, and television actress. She has appeared in Warlock III: The End of Innocence (1999), Goldfish Memory (2003), Alexander (2004), Until Death (2007), Nightwatching (2007), Malice in Wonderland (2009), Outcast (2010), Utopia (2013-2015), Nina Forever (2015), The Living and The Dead (2017), Gretel & Hansel (2020), and Halo in 2022.

== Early life ==
O'Shaughnessy was born in Galway, Ireland. Her father was an information technology consultant, and her mother is a seamstress. O'Shaughnessy's family emigrated to Reading in England, when she was 9. She returned to Galway a decade later where she pursued a career in theatre. At the age of 24 O'Shaughnessy moved to Dublin. She dated Irish comedian David McSavage for a period of time in 2012.

== Career ==
=== Stage ===
O'Shaughnessy's first notable stage role was playing Salome for the Gate Theatre in Dublin. Other stage work has included The Shaughraun for the Abbey Theatre in Dublin, which transferred to the West End's Albery Theatre in 2005. In 2006 she appeared in the UK premiere of Blackwater Angel by Jim Nolan at the Finborough Theatre, London. Other work for the Gate Theatre includes Arms and the Man, Oliver, The Importance of Being Earnest, Pride and Prejudice, Blythe Spirit, Present Laughter (which toured in Charleston, South Carolina), See You Next Tuesday, and Cat on a Hot Tin Roof. She played Cate in the Irish debut of Sarah Kane's play Blasted. Other theatre work includes playing Hilde Wangle in Lady from the Sea and Petra Stockman in Enemy of the People at the Arcola Theatre, London, and Amy in 'The Night Alive' at The Geffen Playhouse in Los Angeles.

=== Film and television ===
Her film roles include Clara in Goldfish Memory, The Halo Effect, and The Stronger.

From 2013, she starred in a main role as Jessica Hyde in the television series Utopia (2013-2015), in a cast which included Adeel Akhtar, Neil Maskell, Alistair Petrie and James Fox.

In 2015, she starred alongside David Troughton in the comedy romantic horror film Nina Forever, for which she received a nomination for best supporting actress at the 2017 Fangoria Chainsaw Awards.

In 2020, she played Mother in the witch horror Gretel & Hansel, and appeared as Maisy Joyce in the 2021 film The Forgiven, with Ralph Fiennes, Jessica Chastain and Matt Smith.

In 2022, she starred as Laera in the fantasy sci-fi series Halo.

== Filmography ==
=== Film ===
Year	Title	Role	Notes
1999	Warlock III: The End of Innocence	Kris' Friend	
2000	Clubbing	Femme Fatale	Short film
2001	Freaky Deaky 10 to 1	Unknown	Short film
2003	Goldfish Memory	Clara	
2004	Belonging	Stephanie	Television film
2004	The Halo Effect	Suzie	
2004	Alexander	Nurse	
2005	Still Life	Woman	Short film
2005	Malice Aforethought	Florence	Television film
2006	The Secret Language	Máthair	
2007	Until Death	Lucy	
2007	Nightwatching	Marita	
2009	Malice in Wonderland	Hooker	
2010	Outcast	Niamh	
2015	Nina Forever	Nina	Nominated - Fangoria Chainsaw Award for Best Supporting Actress
2020	Gretel & Hansel	Mother	
2021	Don't Breathe 2	The Mother (Josephine)	
2021	The Forgiven	Maisy Joyce	

=== Television ===
Year	Title	Role	Notes
2007	Trouble in Paradise	Síofra McShane	2 episodes
2012	Vexed	Sarah Stockwood	Series:2 Episode:5
2013	Agatha Christie's Poirot	Katrina	Episode: "The Labours of Hercules"
2013–2014	Utopia	Jessica Hyde	11 episodes
2015	The Dovekeepers	Channa	2 episodes
2016	Musketeers	Juliette	1 episode S3. E7. "Fool's Gold"
2017	The Living and The Dead	Martha Enderby	2 episodes
2017	Striking Out	Meg	10 episodes
2018	Finding Joy	Silvia	S1, E3: "Letting Go"
2022–2024	Halo	Laera	10 episodes
2023	Foundation	Dr. Tadj	S2, E6: "Why the Gods Made Wine"

=== Audio ===
Year	Title	Role	Company	Notes
2017-2018	Tracks	Rachel Turner	BBC Radio 4	Main in series 2; guest in series 3
