= Esther Bloom =

Fictional character from Hollyoaks

- Hollyoaks character
- Portrayed by: Jazmine Franks
- Duration: 2011–2018
- First appearance: 18 January 2011
- Last appearance: 30 April 2018
- Introduced by: Paul Marquess
- Spin-off appearances: Hollyoaks Later (2013)
In-universe information
- Occupation: Student; Shop assistant; Coffee shop owner; Bar owner
- Father: Brian Bloom
- Wife: Kim Butterfield (2016–2018)
- Grandfathers: Jack Osborne (step)
- Grandmothers: Frankie Osborne
- Uncles: Jake Dean; Craig Dean; Darren Osborne (step)
- Aunts: Steph Cunningham; Debbie Dean

Esther Bloom is a fictional character from the British Channel 4 soap opera Hollyoaks, played by actress Jazmine Franks. The character made her first on-screen appearance on 18 January 2011. Franks had previously auditioned for other roles in the show. She did not think that she had secured the part of Esther and concentrated on her studies until she was informed. As an open lesbian, Esther is comfortable with her sexuality. Since her inception she has shared a friendship with the character Ruby Button (Anna Shaffer) but has long been subjected to her "bitchy" comments. She is characterised as having a "selfless consideration for others" despite being a "proverbial punchbag" for many characters. Esther found confidence when she decided to pursue a fashion career. Franks has said that upon doing so Esther's style also changed.

Esther's first romance is with Tilly Evans (Lucy Dixon) and through them the serial depicted a same sex kiss. Their involvement ceased when Tilly chose to remain single. In 2012, a series of storylines focused around the character were devised. Esther wins an internship with Company magazine. Off-screen the magazine's staff noticed Esther's liking of fashion and contacted Hollyoaks with the storyline idea. The character was later given a storyline focusing on effects of bullying, in which Maddie Morrison (Scarlett Bowman), Sinead O'Connor (Stephanie Davis) and Ruby tease Esther. The bullying of Esther began to worsen and the production team set up a cross-over website titled DocYou to engage the audience with Esther's story. On 11 April 2018, it was announced that Franks would be leaving the show after 7 years and Esther departed on 30 April 2018.

== Casting ==
In January 2011, it was announced that Jazmine Franks would be joining the cast of Hollyoaks in a regular role. Franks found her audition for the role "nerve-wracking" despite having previously auditioned for roles in the show. Franks and other applicants were held in a small room behind a "big black door" and she said that everyone was "petrified". Franks told Daniel Kilkelly of Digital Spy that she did not hear anything for weeks after her audition. She was recalled for the part and waited another five weeks. She presumed that she was unsuccessful and decided to concentrate on her studies. But Franks was then contacted requesting that she attend hair and make-up fittings for Esther within three days.

== Development ==
=== Characterisation ===
"Forever in the shadows, Esther is loyal, self-effacing and kind. She’s endured years of being pushed around by Ruby and yet she remains tolerant and patient of all her best friend’s flightly fancies, offering sage advice and guidance along the way."

— An E4.com reporter on Esther's personality. (2012)

Esther is a lesbian and according to a writer from E4.com, Esther is comfortable with her sexuality. She forms a close friendship with fellow character Ruby Button (Anna Shaffer) but is "she often finds herself at the receiving end of Ruby's bitchy barbs". She eventually grows in confidence when she decides to follow a career in fashion. While another stated that Esther had long been the "proverbial punchbag" of many a Hollyoaks female. Esther is "overlooked and underloved" and is one of the serial's characters that do not get their chance in the "spotlight that they so deserve". She also has a "selfless consideration for others".

Franks told a columnist from Inside Soap that she was not into fashion like Esther is. Originally Esther's attire consisted of "many pairs of jeans and oversized jumpers". Franks did not like her character's "awful" wardrobe because the jumpers made her feel as though she was wearing a "tent" and she had a particuluar dislike of Esther's recurring pink ugg boots. She noted that once Esther took an interest in a fashion career the opportunity to wear "lots of nice clothes" arose. In July 2012, Franks told Kilkelly that she did not want Esther to change because she loved how the writers had written her. She called her character "sure of herself" and noted that "she's not bothered that she stands out, she doesn't want to fit in with the sixth-formers". She was also pleased with the audience reaction to Esther, who had praised the character. Franks explained that "I think she is so real and she is like a normal teenager. She's average - she's not a cow, she's not overly nice, she's just normal and I think that's why people can relate to her a lot more."

=== Romance with Tilly Evans ===
In one storyline Esther shares a holiday romance with Tilly Evans (Lucy Dixon) while they are in Abersoch. A promotional trailer which featured Esther was released to promote the Abersoch episodes. A Western Mail columnist said that it was a "coming-of-age trip". Esther and Tilly portray a lesbian kiss in the episodes and Dixon told a reporter from OK! that this was her first scene that she filmed with the show. Dixon had only known Franks for three hours and thought it was a unique way to join the show. The kiss was not racy because it decided that the two characters were still getting to know each other. Dixon said that she and Franks were relaxed and made it look "convincing". Tilly was later introduced as a regular character. Dixon said that Tilly likes to "keep her options open" and was unlikely to immediately settle down with any girl. Hollyoaks later introduced a storyline which saw Esther become estranged from her friends. Tilly later begins a relationship with her teacher Jen Gilmore (Amy Downham) and Esther uncovers their affair. When Esther discusses it with Ruby and rumours spread. Franks told an Inside Soap columnist that Esther "feels guilty, even though she hasn't really done anything wrong". Esther decides to help Tilly out by pretending that she made up the rumours. Franks explained "it's awful though because everyone thinks Esther is a liar and they turn against her".

=== Internship ===
In June 2012, it was announced that Hollyoaks had entered a partnership with the fashion magazine Company for a storyline involving Esther and George Smith (Steven Roberts). The story arc sees them as new interns at the publications headquarters. The scenes are set in London and the editor, Victoria White cameos in their scenes. Esther and George face hardship in their attempts at independent living and she nearly ends her career by ruining a magazine feature. Paul Millar of Digital Spy also reported that Esther and George's friendship would also be "challenged in the special week" of episodes. The press department at Channel 4 revealed that Esther would take the "centre stage" during the storyline and added that it was "needless to say, fireworks ensue". Company's editor White told Digital Spy's Kilkelly that the brand approached Hollyoaks with the storyline idea. They had noticed that Esther talked about a fashion career and it was brought up in a brainstorming session. One of the staff said "wouldn't it be funny if Esther from Hollyoaks could come to do work experience at Company?" White said that Hollyoaks' producers "loved the idea" and asked White to play herself in the show. They then spent three to four months planning the storyline. Franks told Kilkelly that she found filming the storyline in London fun but tiring because of the demanding filming schedule. She was even required to run in high heel shoes around Carnaby Street while it rained. Franks also enjoyed the opportunity to work with Roberts in "a completely different environment".

Franks explained that a "once-in-a-lifetime opportunity" that has been offered to Esther. She is both "pretty nervous" and "a little bit excited" about her internship, though happy that George accompanies her. Esther always struggles to fit in no matter what she does. True to form when Esther arrives at work over-dressed and wearing jewellery, big hair and make-up "she sticks out like a sore thumb". Franks revealed that Esther and George do not start any rivalry while at work. But jealousy builds as Esther attends a fashion shoot and George is sent to a style shoot. Even with themes of jealousy prevailing in the story, the actress opined that Esther and George formed a "great team". Roberts has said that George is just as grateful to have Esther on the internship because she gave him the courage. He added that the storyline was "the beginning of consolidating their friendship". Esther and George realise they share commanlities and "could be really good friends".

Esther manages to ruin her experience by wearing and tearing an item of clothing needed for a fashion shoot while on a night out. Esther is forced to tell the truth about her mistake. Franks stated that her character is unable to lie and even if she did she would be caught out. "She confesses everything and it doesn't go very well" and George is not impressed. He thinks "Oh, Esther, not again! You've messed something up again!'" Roberts added "Esther is still his friend, so while he's disappointed, he's not nasty about it." She highlighted that things going wrong for Esther had become an established trait. A trait that was portrayed once again as she attempts to offer relationship advice for George and fellow intern Ryan (George Evans) - "it usually backfires". White said that at the end of the week's episodes both Esther and George have "been on a positive journey".

=== Bullying ===
In August 2012, show producer Emma Smithwick announced a "very big storyline" for Esther featuring "long-running bullying". She elaborated that Esther is "the voice of reason" and she wanted to explore "what happens when the popular kid at school, slowly but surely undermines Esther's sense of self". It features themes of "social manipulation and psychological bullying" and results in Esther feeling inadequate. She added that by October 2012 Esther would "hit a pretty big low", she would be lonely and in need of friends. When researching the storyline Franks met a victim of bullying which she said she found "so helpful - it has helped me a lot - but it was an awful story". Esther had previously been teased by Ruby and Sinead O'Connor (Stephanie Davis). They send Amy Barnes (Ashley Slanina-Davies) love letters addressed from Esther and fool her into thinking that transgender Jason Costello (Victoria Atkin) would date her. Franks later announced that the character Maddie Morrison (Scarlett Bowman) would orchestrate the bullying campaign.

When Jack learns that Esther has been truanting college they have an argument. A spokesperson for the show told Susan Hill from the Daily Star that "Jack is angry when he discovers Esther has been skiving from college. Esther is in no mood to be lectured and storms out, unaware of the critical situation she’s left behind." They added that the aftermath of the scenes make a "very emotional and tense time" for the Osborne family. Franks told a reporter from Inside Soap that Maddie starts rumours that Esther has a moustache because "Esther's not Maddie's favourite person since she tried to kiss her in Abersoch". Everyone believes Maddie because she is the "queen bee". But after she argues with Jack who then has a heart attack, Jack's son Darren Osborne (Ashley Taylor Dawson) blames Esther, believing the stress of their argument contributed to Jack's condition. Franks explained that "the guilt hits Esther like a train". But Maddie tries to convince Esther that she is not to blame. Everyone believes Maddie to be genuine, though Esther knows that she is faking. She is pushed to "breaking point" and punches Maddie in the face. Franks noted that "it's so out of character for Esther, but she ends up punching Maddie, it's her way of saying to everyone at sixth-form college" that she is not to be messed with.

But the bullying continued. As Carena Crawford from Reveal noted that Esther was having a "tough" time at college and "evil Maddie twists the knife in even further and ups her bullying antics". Esther accuses Phoebe Jackson (Mandip Gill) and the writer suggested that direction of the plot could see Esther could "end up friendless". Crawford later added that after another "horrendous week [and] suffering more humiliation at the hands of nasty Maddie" - she did not think that Esther's life would become "easier". Digital Spy announced that the bullying would intensify when Esther crashes a bike and reveals her underwear resulting in video footage being posted online.

While Maddie and Sinead bully Esther, her friend Ruby joins in and fails to protect Esther. Shaffer told Kilkelly that the story was a great one to be involved with because bullying is "an important issue". She felt that Ruby was not defending Esther because she wanted to be with "the cool kids". Ruby ultimately fears that her friendship with Esther will ruin her bond with Maddie and Sinead. Shaffer opined that Ruby acts "quite badly" and does not stand up to her friends. While Maddie and Sinead are being "bitchy and mean" to Esther, she felt that Ruby was worse because she is not preventing the bullying. The actress found it difficult to be mean to Franks character because they are good friends off-screen. But she noted that they had to remain professional and "get the job done". Kilkelly later revealed that Maddie would fool Esther into thinking she has made a new friend online. They make her think she has found a dead body and grab her from behind. Esther wets herself and the sixth formers record the event. In this part of the storyline Ruby feels guilty but as before she does not support Esther. Shaffer explained that Ruby goes along with their plan but is reluctant. But Ruby fails to prevent the prank and "Esther is really upset" and the bullying continues.

In October 2012, producers announced a "special online project" to run alongside Esther's storyline. When Dylan Shaw (Mikey Riddington-Smith) creates his own micro-blogging site DocYou other characters decide to misuse it to broadcast humiliating content about Esther. Hollyoaks had entered into partnership with Channel 4 Education and organisation Beatbullying to publish the website for real. The development offered viewers exclusive content and another way to connect with Esther's story. In addition it was created with the hope of highlighting the impact of social media on human life. A spokesperson stated that it would show how social media can be used as an extra way to bully another person. The cast offered their services to Beatbullying acting as mentors aiding bullying victims. Producer Bryan Kirkwood stated "I am really proud of this story and how it realistically approaches bullying, which is so relevant to our audience" and confirmed Esther's bullying would continue into the following year.

=== Departure ===
On 11 April 2018, it was announced that Franks had decided to leave the show and had already filmed her final scenes in March. The actress stated that she had enjoyed her time in the role and cited the departure of on-screen grandmother Frankie as a reason for Esther being written out. Franks stated that the show's producer Bryan Kirkwood brought her departure about. He told her "look, we just think we've come to an end with Esther." She was in agreement with him because of her character's lengthy tenure and storylines. Anna Shaffer reprised her role as Esther's foster sister Ruby Button for the character's exit. Esther decides to move to Spain with Ruby after Darcy Wilde (Aisling Jarrett-Gavin) poisons her and she argues with Jack. Esther final scenes aired on 30 April 2018.

== Storylines ==
Esther breaks into Frankie (Helen Pearson) and Jack Osborne's (James McKenna) house and takes shelter in the attic. Tom Cunningham (Ellis Hollins) mistakes her for an intruder and knocks her unconscious with a cricket bat. Esther is taken to hospital and Jack tells the police that he hit her to protect Tom. Esther regains consciousness and tells Frankie that she is her granddaughter. She reveals that her father had died and she knew Frankie was his birth mother. Frankie realises that she is telling the truth and invites her to stay with them. When Jack and Gilly Roach (Anthony Quinlan) ask Esther to move out, she threatens to tell the police that Tom is responsible for hitting her. Tom then confesses to the police that he hit Esther. Tom is ordered to face court for his actions and Esther tries to defend his actions, but he is still found guilty. Esther, Ruby Button (Anna Shaffer) and Ricky Campbell (Ashley Margolis) truant from school and play kissing games, then Esther reveals that she is a lesbian. Ruby kisses Esther and Ricky to decide who is the best kisser. Duncan Button (Dean Aspen) develops feelings for Esther, unaware of her sexuality, so she rebuffs his advances. Esther kisses Seth Costello (Miles Higson) as a joke, which humiliates him. Ruby films the kiss and uploads it to her website. Esther feels guilty and refuses kiss Seth again. She tells Ruby that she is in a relationship with Sinead. Ruby questions Sinead who laughs off Esther's lies, but forgives her. Ruby and Sinead make Esther think that Jason is interested in her. They set up a date between the pair, although Jason is unaware of Esther's interest. When she tells Jason that his transgender status would not effect a potential relationship, he reveals that he still likes men. Esther is humiliated and Jason accuses Ruby and Sinead of bullying Esther. Ruby writes a love letter to Amy and addresses it from Esther. After more pranks, Esther soon stands up to Ruby. Ruby apologizes and Esther forgives her.

Esther goes to Abersoch with Ruby, Sinead and Bart McQueen and meets Tilly, who reveals that she is also a lesbian. The pair have a holiday romance and fall for each other quickly and fall for each other quickly, but break up when the holiday is over. When Sinead is hospitalized after almost drowning, Ruby forms a plan to sneak back on the bus so Jack and Frankie wouldn't find out they were there, as they lied about where they were during the week. The plan is a success and Sinead promises to keep quiet about them being there. While on their own Ruby and Esther have a heart to heart about their places in the Osborne family and comfort each other by saying even if the family doesn't fully accept them, they have each other and that's what matters. When Tilly begins attending Hollyoaks Sixth Form College, Esther goes to see Tilly. She tells a heartbroken Esther that she does not want a relationship. Esther attends a night out at a local gay bar. Tilly tries to kiss Esther, which makes her angry and she tells Tilly that she will not be used. Esther agrees to be friends with her again. Esther accidentally exposes Tilly's relationship with her teacher Jen and lies to get her out of trouble. Esther and George go to work for "Company" magazine for work experience. Esther makes a few mistakes but ends the week with a successful project. She goes to Abersoch where Maddie is annoyed by her presence. When Esther helps Maddie escape from being attacked by a man, she tells Esther that she misjudged her. Esther tries to kiss Maddie who is not interested. When Esther tells confidential information about Maddie to Tilly, Maddie starts bullying Esther. She truants college but when Jack confronts her she walks off, unaware that he has collapsed from a heart attack. She punches Maddie in the face when she goads her about Jack. Phoebe realises that Esther is being bullied and she attacks Maddie to defend Esther. Sinead and Ruby begin to join in on the bullying and Jen tries to help her resulting in Esther holding a fashion show but her dress slips off when she trip leaving her standing there naked Maddie then posts this on YouTube the next day Esther becomes lonely as the three girls play tricks on her. They post a video of Esther wetting herself online and more students mock Esther. After learning that Ruby plans to elope to Gretna Green to get married, she forces a drugged-up Bart to chase them. However, Bart begins speeding forcing Maddie who is driving the minibus to also speed up. The brakes in the stolen minivan do not work and Maddie drives the van into the wedding venue of Tony Hutchinson (Nick Pickard), Cindy Cunningham (Stephanie Waring), Ste Hay (Kieron Richardson) and Doug Carter's (PJ Brennan) double wedding. Esther tries to convince Bart to go and help out but he drives away before she gets a chance to get out of the car. Maddie and Neil dies in the crash and shortly afterwards Jono dies in Ruby's arms after saving Ruby and Sinead from the wreckage. Bart, Sinead and Ruby pressure Esther in to keeping her and Bart's involvement in the crash a secret. After Maddie's death, Sinead and Ruby blame Esther. They intensify the bullying until Esther decides to take her own life. She drinks a bottle of vodka and with pills, but wakes up the next morning. Esther is hospitalised and has to have a liver transplant. Ruby admits bullying Esther, who tells the bullies that she forgives them. Esther starts a relationship with Tilly but are both caught when they decide to take things further. Tilly then breaks things off at Frankie's request but get back together when Esther and Tilly are performing The Wizard of Oz. Esther changes her scene and gives Tilly a heartfelt speech then kiss Tilly and Holly go away for the weekend, they are accompanied by Jade who wants revenge on Esther. Her boyfriend's liver was given to Esther after he had died and Jade was convinced Esther didn't deserve it so took her hostage and tried to cut the liver out. Callum tried to rescue Esther but was fatally stabbed through the back by Jade. Jade was killed and Esther and Tilly returned to Hollyoaks.

Esther and Tilly break up after Ruby has a heart attack at New Year because Tilly is in love with Chloe and Tilly leaves Hollyoaks with her, devastating Esther. Esther supported the Osbornes when it was revealed Sienna has kidnapped Tom and Esther seemed to be the only one to believe Nancy. During her exams in the spring/summer of 2014, she takes photos of the exam papers, but Nancy believes Robbie Roscoe (Charlie Wernham) and Esther lets him take the blame, but then admits it. In September Esther finds £50 000 in cash in a bin, which was placed there accidentally by Nana McQueen. The cash was meant to be used by Grace Black and Trevor Royle to pay off Big Bob. However Esther decides to take the money and with the guidance off George and Frankie she invests the money into College Coffee, rebranding it; 'Esther's Magic Bean'. Esther soon discovers the money belongs to Grace and is left worried, when Grace forgets her change at the coffee shop Esther goes to the club to give it her, accidentally stumbling across Big Bob. This leads to him to mistake Esther for Grace and he kidnaps her for a ransom of £50 000, (the money which he was owed). Trevor receives threats off Big Bob telling him he has Grace, he is frantic until he realises it is Esther he has. Grace, Trevor and Freddie all arrive to save Esther at the abandoned factory and are relieved to find her alive. However Grace is taken at gun point by Big Bob. Just before she is about to be shot Esther saves her by knocking Big Bob out. The next day Grace turns up at The coffee shop to show Esther gratitude but unfortunately find the bag in which the £50 000 was initially stored in and discovers the truth. Furious, Grace confronts Esther and she hands the coffee shop over to Grace. Still not happy Grace makes Esther work in the coffee shop with no wage until she makes up the money. In October, Esther becomes part of the hospital siege after she collapsed. Esther gets worse during the siege and soon becomes unconscious, going into anaphalactic leaving Grace and Lindsey's sister Kim to help her.

Since Grace became infertile when Mercedes and Freddie Roscoe shot her with her gun; Esther agrees to be a surrogate mother for Grace and Trevor. Frankie interrupts Esther's plan but Esther angrily advises Frankie that it is her choice, not Frankie's. When Grace starts a campaign against Freddie Roscoe (Charlie Clapham) because of the murder of her father, Fraser, Esther changes her mind about the surrogacy to punish Grace, but when Trevor talks her over, Esther decides to stay ahead of the surrogacy. However, Frankie disowns her after she chooses being a surrogate mother over her family. Esther becomes pregnant and moves in with Grace and Trevor. She meets Kim Butterfield (Daisy Wood-Davis) and soon begins a relationship with her. Kim and Grace go to war over Esther, grace believing that Kim and Esther will want to leave the village. Esther tries to settle the conflict, but it only sparks passion during an argument and unbeknownst to Esther, Grace and Kim soon start a secret relationship as Grace wants Kim to keep quiet about the shooting of Phoebe McQueen. As Kim becomes obsessed with Grace, she spikes Esther's drink with labour inducing pills. However, due to interference with different people, the car Esther is travelling in with Sinead breaks down and without a phone and in labour, Sinead is forced to help deliver her baby boy. When Sinead goes to find help, Esther has a haemorrhage. She is taken to hospital, and realizing how she cares for the baby, she admits that she does not want to give the baby to Trevor and Grace and tells Kim, who immediately tells Grace and Trevor. Esther refuses to change her mind, even when Trevor and Grace attempt to convince her. Frankie takes her side too. Kim then says to Grace that she will deal with Esther severely. Then at night, an unidentified person appears and attempts to pour potassium chloride in her medical drip, but Esther has a cardiac arrest from the hemorrhage, causing the person to make a retreat when the alarms start ringing. She get resuscitated on the scene, but Kim then goes in Esther's room, says no-one can know what she did, and then transfers Esther to a hospital in Manchester, to get her away from Grace.

After a few weeks, Esther wakes up from her coma and is transferred back to Dee Valley Hospital where Jack, Frankie, Grace, Trevor and Kim all tell her different versions of what happened. Esther then tricks Grace and Trevor that she's going to hand Curtis over to them but in exchange she wants one night with him. When they go back to check later they learn that Esther has discharged herself and fled with Kim and the baby. Embarking on a car chase Trevor gets Curtis out of the car just before it gets turned over by a police car. Trevor and Dylan Jenkins get her out of the car and while in hospital she discovers Kim's obsession with Grace and dumps her. After Dylan's death, Trevor and Esther strike a deal where they can share custody of Curtis provided that he gets rid of Grace. When Kim and Lindsey frame Trevor for Lindsey's crimes as the Gloved Hand Killer including putting Freddie's 'dead' body in the trunk of his car, Esther then wants Curtis to live with her but changes her mind and allows Grace to care for him after she makes a passionate speech about how much Curtis means to her. Esther then develops feelings for Grace as she helps her look after Curtis, but then witnesses Grace sleeping with Darren. On New Year's Day Darren gets back together with Nancy and Grace is heartbroken but Esther and Grace kiss and the two start a relationship.

Esther starts a feud with Trevor over Esther not leaving him see Curtis. Kim's sister Lindsay (Sophie Austin) who was recently revealed as the Gloved Hand Killer, witnesses the two fighting and wanting to frame Trevor for all the murders, injects Esther with potassium chloride when she is working late in The Bean. Kim finds her and calls an ambulance. Believing Trevor to be the culprit, Esther tells the police it was Trevor. Kim is arrested for the murders after being set up by Lindsay and is imprisoned. Esther and Mercedes McQueen (Jennifer Metcalfe) realise that Lindsay is the killer. Kim is released and Lindsay goes on the run. She takes Frankie hostage and tells Esther to help her escape or she will kill Frankie. Esther agrees and Lindsay goes on the run. Esther comforts Kim with Lindsay is murdered by serial killer Silas Blissett (Jeff Rawle).

Esther and Kim reconcile and decide to get married, making Frankie and Grace angry. Kim believes that Esther still loves Grace and fakes a mental breakdown. Esther discovers the truth and breaks up with Kim but when Kim makes her see how much she loves her, they get back together. Frankie and Grace try and ruin the wedding but they get married anyway. Kim goes missing hours after they get married and returns a few weeks later with no explanation of where she went.

Esther and all the Osbornes had to flee the village as well as Kim as Jack had received a mysterious phone call telling him to run as someone was after him and not to trust the police. The family didn't know who was after them and was scared so they fled to Wales. They were running from Jack's niece, dirty copper, Eva Falco (Kerry Bennett). After Jack had blamed his brother Billy, Eva's dad, for murdering a young man, Billy ended up in prison for life, and so Eva wanted revenge.

On 31 December 2016, Esther was shot in the head accidentally by Eva and was left in a coma. Her memory was inconsistent and she had mood swings taking her bad moods out on wife Kim and grandmother Frankie, but not with Grace. Esther, not in her right mind state, asked Grace to kill Eva for what she has done to her and Grace shot Eva. Kim starts using Esther's head injury against her, desperate to save their marriage and tells Esther that Grace shot her to make her scared of Grace, however, Esther soon learns the truth. Esther attends Maxine (Nikki Sanderson) and Adam (Jimmy Essex) engagement party. She uses a video camera to record the night but Kim gets annoyed with all the fun she's having. Once they get home, Kim throws away the camera and tells Esther there was no party, confusing Esther. Esther finds the camera and confronts Kim. Kim tells her that she saw Grace at the party and that they had to leave. Esther wakes up and finds her leg in a cast and Kim tells her she fell off the city wall and broke her leg and that Grace murdered Frankie and Jack. Grace comes back to save Esther from Kim and Esther realises her leg is fine so she leaves Kim. Kim moves into the Osbornes' attic to be close to Esther. Kim stands on the city wall and threatens to jump. Esther pleads with Kim to get down and when Kim tries to get down, she slips and falls off the wall. She is taken to hospital and survives and is later sectioned.

Esther attends the Osbornes' foster daughter Jade Albright (Kassius Nelson) memorial at Hollyoaks High. An explosion caused by Mac Nightingale (David Easter) tears through the school. Esther escapes with no injuries. She is devastated when Frankie dies from a stroke while at home alone. She helps Jack cope after Frankie's death. Esther starts planning Frankie's funeral but is annoyed when the caterers cancel. Ruby returns for Frankie's funeral. Frankie's funeral day descends into chaos when Darren and Jack don't make it to the church. They arrive on a motorbike and Jack says his final goodbye to his wife. Everything kicks off at the wake when Ruby tries to kiss Darren's friend Luke Morgan (Gary Lucy) and they cause a scene. Esther tearfully runs off and Ruby follows her. She comforts Esther in The Bean and they reminisce about Frankie. Ruby invites Esther to come live with her in Spain. Jack is attacked by Mac after he discovers that he caused the explosion. He is rushed to hospital where he flatlines, but the doctors revive him. Esther tells Darren and Nancy about her moving to Spain and Darren angrily shouts at her for abandoning them. He later apologises to Esther at the hospital and tells her that she's like a sister to him. Jack survives and Esther decides not to go to Spain.

One night while Esther and Grace are alone in The Bean, a gang of thugs come in with baseball bats. Esther and Grace get down on the floor and the thugs raid The Bean. Esther takes a disliking to Grace's boyfriend Glenn Donovan (Bob Cryer). He tries to ruin Esther and Graces friendship. Esther overhears Glenn telling someone to meet up with him. Esther tells Grace and Grace confronts Glenn, but he reveals he was going to propose and is smitten that Esther fell into his trap. Grace later tells Esther to stay away.

Esther becomes annoyed when Jack gets together with Darcy Wilde (Aisling Jarrett-Gavin), knowing she doesn't really love him. She is shocked when Darcy's son Toby (Lucas Haywood) reveals that Darcy deleted a message that Frankie sent to Jack before she died. She tells Jack but he refuses to believe her. Esther is horrified when Jack proposes to Darcy and she accepts. She is later furious when she finds Darcy wearing Frankie's necklace because Frankie promised Esther she could have it. Esther and Nancy get Darcy's ex-boyfriend Adam to seduce her but she discovers there plan and tells Jack, leaving him furious. She is shocked when Jack and Darcy get married without telling anyone. They argue and Jack tells Esther to pack her bags and be gone by the end of the day. Jack is allowed to get a heart bypass leaving Darcy horrified so she spikes his whiskey. She then realises that she really does love Jack and stops him from drinking it, and they return to their wedding party. An emotional Esther comes downstairs and drinks the whiskey and later collapses. Darren and Nancy come home and find her and they call an ambulance, panicking Darcy. Darcy leaves the village for good.

Esther survives and is angry at Jack for not believing her. Ruby returns and Esther decides to move to Spain to run a bar with Ruby. She decides not to tell anyone but Jack walks in on her packing. They argue, and Jack tells her he never wants to see her again, as he didn't want her to leave as she was the only person he has left for Frankie memories. Esther runs into Grace in the village and tells her that she's leaving. Grace apologises for not speaking to her and they say an emotional goodbye. Esther calls Grace her " Guardian Angel" and they kiss which is witnessed by Glenn. Esther meets up with Jack in The Bean and they have a heart to heart and Jack says she will always be family. They make one last stop to The Hutch where she says goodbye to Darren, Nancy, Tom, Charlie and Oscar. Esther and Ruby get into the taxi and they find a large sum of money. Ruby asks where did it come from and Esther looks behind her and sees Grace who blows a kiss and Esther replies "My Guardian Angel". They then leave for Spain and Esther finally gets her happy ending.

== Reception ==
A writer from MSN branded Esther a "budding fashion designer". In a poll created by E4, viewers voted Esther as the character most suitable for a lifelong best friend. A reporter from the Huddersfield Daily Examiner said that the Company magazine episodes were "a big week" for Esther. While a Liverpool Echo critic bemoaned Esther's "harsh words" resulting in Jack's heart attack, noting that the character had been through worse such as brankruptcy and prison time. All About Soap journalist Kerry Barrett said viewers should "watch out" for Franks amongst other cast members, who she felt "all act their socks off" during the Enjoy The Ride storyline. In 2018, Susannah Alexander from Digital Spy noted that fans were "desperate" for Esther to "pull through" after being accidentally spiked by Darcy Wilde (Aisling Jarrett-Gavin).
