= Abigail Hardingham =

British actress (born 1991)

- Born: 1991 (age 34–35)
- Citizenship: United Kingdom
- Notable work: The Missing
- Awards: "Most Promising Newcomer," British Independent Film Awards, 2015

Abigail Hardingham (born circa 1991) is a British actress. Hardingham's roles include Alice Webster in the BBC Drama The Missing (2016) and Holly in the British horror comedy film Nina Forever. In 2015, Hardingham was awarded "Most Promising Newcomer" by the British Independent Film Awards.

== Early life and education ==
Hardingham's stepfather is in the Royal Air Force and as a child, her family was stationed in Germany, where she lived for three years. She calls herself a "military brat." Hardingham expressed at age ten, to her mother, that she wanted to try acting. Her mother enrolled her in an acting club, which resulted in Hardingham hiring an agent. Her first acting job was when she was eleven. Hardingham lived in High Wycombe and when she was sixteen, she moved to London so she could pursue her acting career.

== Career ==
In 2015, Hardingham was named "Most Promising Newcomer" by the British Independent Film Awards.

== Filmography ==
Year	Title	Role	Notes
2009	Freak	Heather	16 episodes
2011	The Sparticle Mystery	Kat	13 episodes
2011	Gary and Gail	Gail	Short film
2011	Waterloo Road	Andi O'Donnell	1 episode
2011–2016	Silent Witness	Sarah Begovic / Catherine 'Cats' Felton	4 episodes
2012	In the Back	Bailey	Short film
2012	Cardinal Burns	Zooey	1 episode
2012	Lewis	Jessica Lake	1 episode
2012	Doctors	Kristy Spalding	1 episode
2012	Spy	Girl in Club	1 episode
2013	Holby City	Claudia O'Keefe	1 episode
2013	Hollyoaks Later	Corporal Taylor Wells	5 episodes
2015	Obsession: Dark Desires	Rose Ryan	1 episode
2015	Broadchurch	Madeline	1 episode
2015	Nina Forever	Holly	Film
2015	Sealed with a Kiss	Flo	Short film
2016	Sasquatch	Mel	Film
2016	Angel of Decay	Liz	Film
2016	The Missing	Alice Webster / Sophie Giroux	8 episodes
2016	Silent Witness	Sarah Begovic	“Flight: Parts 1 and 2” S19:E3&4
2017	Will	Moll	9 episodes
2018	12 Monkeys	Emma Kirschner	4 episodes
2018	The Innocents	Kam	5 episodes
2019	Casualty	Effie Laurence	Recurring role
2021	Who Pressed Mute on Uncle Marcus?	Abby	FMV video game
