= Jimmy Essex =

British actor

- Occupations: Actor; musician; dancer
- Years active: 2011–present
- Television: The X Factor; Hollyoaks
- Spouse: Charles Simmons

Jimmy Essex is a British actor, dancer and musician. Essex performed as part of a band in the ninth series of The X Factor in 2012, but the band did not get through to the live finals. Essex has also worked as a backup dancer. From 2016 to 2018, Essex played the regular role of Adam Donovan on the British soap opera Hollyoaks. Essex played the lead role in the 2020 play GHBoy and has appeared in other acting projects.

== Life and career ==
Essex was born in 1984 or 1985. He is from Harrow, London. Essex is a singer and actor and has been in the West End. In 2014, Essex appeared in the video Mr Bowler Presents - Hideaway. He has also been a backup dancer for Janet Jackson. In 2012, Essex appeared in the ninth series of the British television music competition The X Factor, performing as part of the band "MITSOTU" (which stands for "Music Is The Soul Of The Universe") with James Collins and Holly Cooper. The group, who had previously performed in various London schools in 2011, did their first audition for the show in June 2012 in front of an audience of 6000 people and went through to the next stage of the show after scoring four "yes" votes. All three members had "MITSOTU" tattooed on their left arms. The group was unsuccessful in getting to the talent show's live finals, losing out to rival group MK1. However, the band continued performing gigs at other venues, such as Kensington Roof Gardens. Essex was also in the 2016 advertisements for Coca-Cola, which he filmed in Madrid.

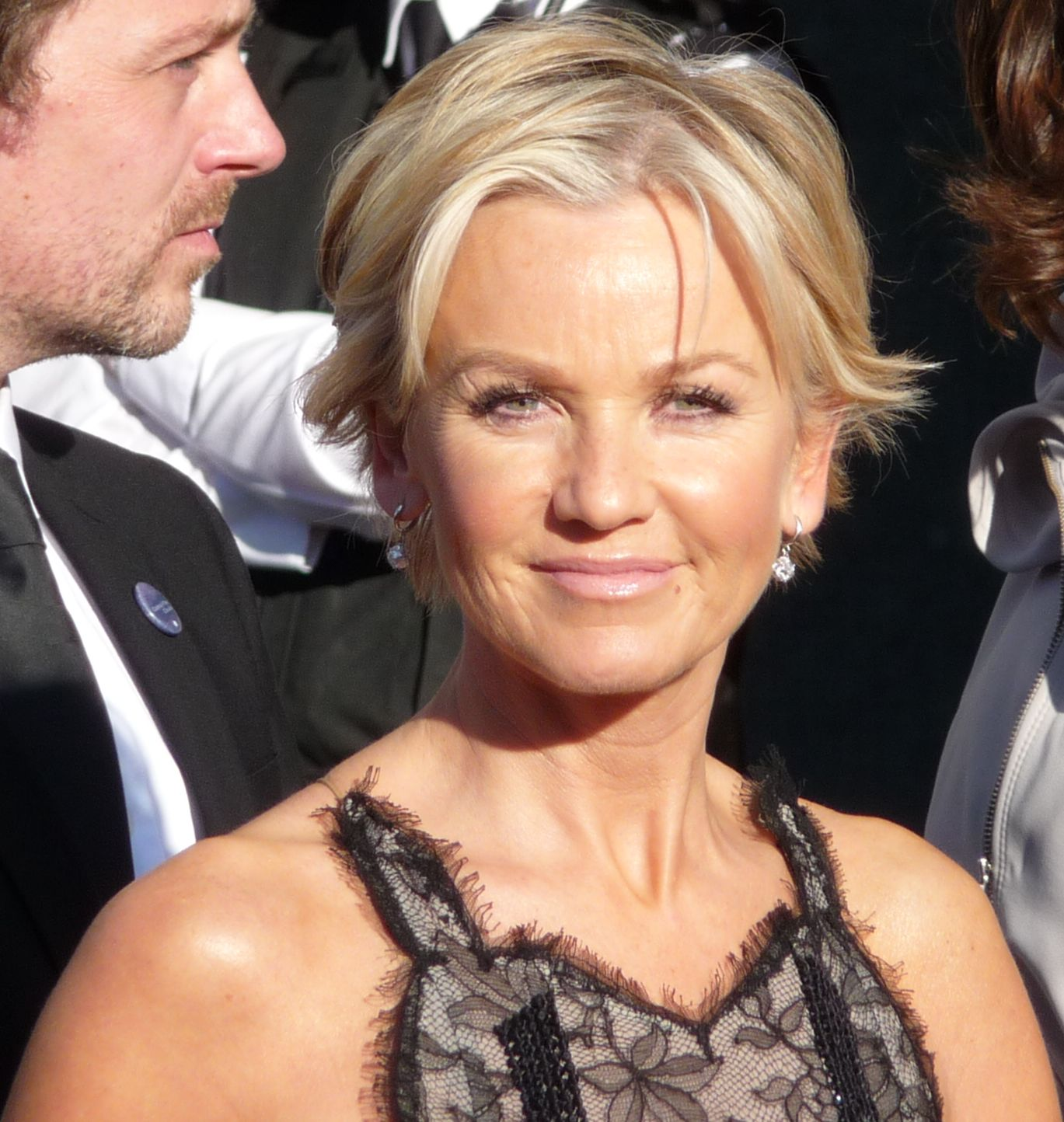
Essex enjoyed working with Lisa Maxwell (pictured) on Hollyoaks

In March 2016, it was announced that Essex joined the cast of the British soap opera Hollyoaks as Adam Donovan, who was introduced with his younger brothers Jesse (Luke Jerdy) and Liam Donovan (Maxim Baldry) as an extension of Grace Black's (Tamara Wall) family. Essex, Baldry and Jerdy had auditioned together. Essex's debut as Adam aired in April of that year. After his initial appearance in April 2016, Essex's return to the soap aired on 13 June of that year. Essex felt very nervous when he first started on the soap, and Jerdy said that Essex was so nervous saying his lines during his first scenes that he was shaking, although he "got away with it" because it was cold. Jerdy and Wall have joked that Essex was the "worst" for giggling on set and would sometimes have to walk off set because of it. The actor had been a fan of Hollyoaks and felt nervous meeting some of the cast as he knew them from watching the show. Initially, Essex found it strange to work with Lisa Maxwell, who plays the brothers' mother Tracey Donovan, as he used to watch her on television. As his character was a hairdresser, Essex was given some lessons in the profession to help him with the portrayal.

"I was so nervous, that I spent about a week learning [my lines] through and through. It was awful. I forgot how to walk. I was walking same arms and legs because I was that nervous. It was horrible".

— Essex reflecting on his initial Hollyoaks scenes (2018)

One of Adam's storylines saw a love triangle between Adam, Maxine Minniver (Nikki Sanderson) and Darcy Wilde (Aisling Jarrett-Gavin). In 2018, Adam was involved in a storyline where his behaviour got darker and was involved in a mystery storyline where Adam was seen being told to shoot someone in a flash forward episode; Essex enjoyed portraying the villainous side to the character. The plot eventually led to Adam being fatally shot by his father Glenn Donovan (Bob Cryer) in the episode originally broadcast on 23 May 2018. Adam's death was longlisted for "Best Exit" at the 2018 Inside Soap Awards.

Essex portrayed Peter in the 2020 film A Dark Path. Essex was then part of the cast of the play GHBoy, which was due to be performed in December 2020 at Charing Cross Theatre. The play explored chemsex within the LGBTQ+ male community. Essex portrayed Robert Finch, a character who is grieving the death of his father whilst dealing with substance abuse and infidelity. Essex said that the character's "innocence" and "vulnerability" drew him into the role, and said that he related to the character's journey. Essex also expressed frustration at the lack of support given by the government towards the theatre industry during the COVID-19 pandemic in the United Kingdom. In 2025, Essex was part of the short film Daddy Issues.

== Personal life ==
In October 2017, Essex worked with his Hollyoaks colleagues Jarrett-Gavin, Maxwell and Wall to raise money for the charity Centrepoint as part of its Sleep Out event in Manchester, with the event including the actress and Essex reading a bedtime story. Essex said in 2017 that his favourite actor is James McAvoy.

Essex is part of the LGBTQ+ community. Essex began dating musician Charles Simmons in 2013. Essex revealed in January 2019 that the couple had gotten engaged after Simmons had proposed to him with a diamond ring whilst the pair were on holiday in Sri Lanka. Later in 2019, Essex and Simmons were featured in an episode of Trailblazers, an LGBTQ+ video miniseries created by Gay Times and Celebrity Cruises. In 2020, it was reported that Essex and Simmons were married.

== Acting credits ==
=== Filmography ===
List of acting roles
Year	Title	Role	Notes	Ref.
2012	The X Factor	Himself	Series 9	
2014	Mr Bowler Presents - Hideaway	Male dancer	Video	
2016–18	Hollyoaks	Adam Donovan	Regular role	
2019	Trailblazers	Himself	Miniseries	
2020	A Dark Path	Peter	Film	
2025	Daddy Issues	Felix	Short film	

=== Theatre ===
Year	Production	Venue	Role	Ref.
2020	GHBoy	Robert	Charing Cross Theatre	
