= Duncan Lindsay =

Duncan Lindsay may refer to:

- Duncan Lindsay (Australian footballer) (1902–1967), Australian rules footballer
- Duncan Lindsay (Scottish footballer) (1903–1972), Scottish footballer

== See also ==
- Lindsay Duncan (born 1950), Scottish actress
