= Meet the Parents (TV series) =

British game show (2010–2012)

- Genre: Comedy
- Created by: Lee Hupfield
- Directed by: Paul Young (Series 1); Peter Orton (Series 2)
- Presented by: Alex Zane (Series 2)
- Narrated by: Ed Hall (Series 1)
- Country of origin: United Kingdom
- Original language: English
- No. of series: 2
- No. of episodes: 12

Production
- Executive producers: Lee Hupfield; Andrew Newman; Rachel Springett (Series 2)
- Producers: Rachel Springett (Series 1); Laura Clark (Series 2)
- Editors: Gareth Heal (Series 1); Dan Ablett (Series 2)
- Running time: 30 minutes (Series 1); 65 minutes (Series 2)
- Production company: Objective Productions

Original release
- Network: E4
- Release: 10 November 2010 – 17 October 2012

Meet the Parents is a hidden camera comedy game show that aired on E4 from 10 November 2010 to 17 October 2012. It was narrated by Ed Hall for series 1, then Alex Zane took over as presenter for series 2.

== Transmissions ==
Series	Start date	End date	Episodes
1	18 November 2010	19 December 2010	6
2	12 September 2012	17 October 2012	6
