= Jazmine Franks =

British actress, powerlifter (born 1992)

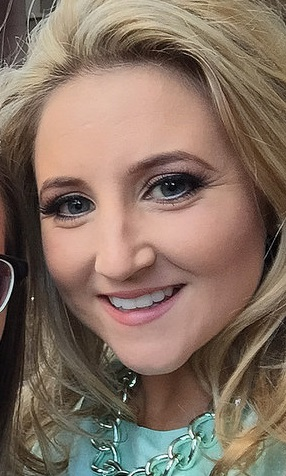
- Jazmine Franks (2015)
- Born: Jazmine Franks; 20 February 1992 (age 34); England, United Kingdom
- Occupations: Actress, powerlifter
- Years active: 2003–present
- Notable work: Hollyoaks (2011–2018)
- Children: 1

Jazmine Franks (born 20 February 1992) is a British actress and powerlifter best known for playing Esther Bloom in Hollyoaks from 2011 to 2018. She is also notable for her role as teenager Kirsty in the 2006 miniseries Johnny and the Bomb. She has also appeared as Jane Morris on the ITV miniseries The Second Coming, on the Channel 4 comedy-drama series Shameless and on the BBC One drama The Street.

Whilst in Hollyoaks, Franks was involved in a highly publicised storyline where her character was bullied by her classmates. The soap worked with several charities to ensure the storyline was portrayed accurately. In 2018, Franks opted to leave the serial and Esther departed on 30 April 2018.

Franks is a competitive powerlifter, first entering a competition at the 2016 EPA SWPLA Dorset Open, (Note: English Powerlifting Association (EPA), South West Powerlifting Association (SWLPA)) competing in all disciplines of the 57 kilograms (126 lb) weight class. In 2019, at the EPF European Classic Bench Press Championships, (Note: European Powerlifting Federation (EPF)) she finished in 4th place finish for the open bench press discipline, in the 52 kilograms (115 lb) weight class.
