= The Family Upstairs (disambiguation) =

The Family Upstairs is a 1925 play by Harry Delf.

The Family Upstairs may also refer to:

- The Family Upstairs (film), 1926 American silent comedy film based on the play
- The Family Upstairs (novel), 2019 novel by Lisa
- The Dingbat Family, also known as The Family Upstairs, an American comic strip 1910–1916
- The Family Upstairs, a 1974 children's book by Janet McNeill

== See also ==
- Harmony at Home (1930), film adaptation of The Family Upstairs (1925)
- Stop, Look and Love (1939), film adaptation of The Family Upstairs (1925)
