= Audie Award for Thriller or Suspense =

The Audie Award for Thriller or Suspense is one of the Audie Awards presented annually by the Audio Publishers Association (APA). It awards excellence in narration, production, and content for a thriller or suspense audiobook released in a given year. It has been awarded since 2007.

== Winners and finalists ==
=== 2000s ===
Year	Audiobook	Author(s)	Narrator(s)	Publisher	Result	Ref.
2007 12th	The Dead Yard (2006)	Adrian McKinty	Gerard Doyle	Blackstone Audio	Winner	
2007 12th	Night of the Jaguar (2006)	Michael Gruber	Jonathan Davis	BBC Audiobooks America	Finalist	
2007 12th	Surrender (2005)	Sonya Hartnett	Humphrey Bower	Bolinda Audio	Finalist	
2007 12th	The Foreign Correspondent (2006)	Alan Furst	Alfred Molina	Simon & Schuster Audio	Finalist	
2007 12th	The Wall (2006)	Jeff Long	Grover Gardner	Tantor Audio	Finalist	
2008 13th	Heart-Shaped Box (2007)	Joe Hill	Stephen Lang	HarperAudio	Winner	
2008 13th	Daddy's Girl (2007)	Lisa Scottoline	Barbara Rosenblat	HarperAudio	Finalist	
2008 13th	The Judas Strain (2007)	James Rollins	Peter Jay Fernandez	HarperAudio	Finalist	
2008 13th	No Time for Goodbye (2007)	Linwood Barclay	Christopher Lane	Brilliance Audio	Finalist	
2008 13th	The Secret Servant (2007)	Daniel Silva	Phil Gigante	Brilliance Audio	Finalist	
2008 13th	What the Dead Know (2007)	Laura Lippman	Linda Emond	HarperAudio	Finalist	
2009 14th	Child 44 (2008)	Tom Rob Smith	Dennis Boutsikaris	Hachette Audio	Winner	
2009 14th	Blue Heaven (2008)	C. J. Box	John Bedford Lloyd	Macmillan Audio	Finalist	
2009 14th	The Dying Breed (2008)	Declan Hughes	Stanley Townsend	Isis Publishing	Finalist	
2009 14th	Sweetheart (2008)	Chelsea Cain	Carolyn McCormick	Macmillan Audio	Finalist	
2009 14th	The Graveyard Book (2008)	Neil Gaiman	Neil Gaiman	HarperAudio	Finalist	

=== 2010s ===
Year	Audiobook	Author(s)	Narrator(s)	Publisher	Result	Ref.
2010 15th	Darling Jim (2007)	Christian Moerk	Stephen Hoye and Justine Eyre	Tantor Audio	Winner	
2010 15th	The Devil's Punchbowl (2009)	Greg Iles	Dick Hill	Brilliance Audio	Finalist	
2010 15th	Level 26: Dark Origins (2009)	Anthony E. Zuiker and Duane Swierczynski	John Glover	Penguin Audiobooks	Finalist	
2010 15th	The Price of Love (2009)	Peter Robinson	John Lee, Gideon Emery, Rosalyn Landor, and Angela Goethals	HarperAudio	Finalist	
2010 15th	Road Dogs (2009)	Elmore Leonard	Peter Francis James	HarperAudio	Finalist	
2011 16th	The Girl Who Kicked the Hornets' Nest (2009)	Stieg Larsson	Simon Vance	Random House Audio	Winner	
2011 16th	Interface by	Neal Stephenson and J. Frederick George	Oliver Wyman	Audible, Inc.	Finalist	
2011 16th	The Book of Spies	Gayle Lynds	Kate Reading	Blackstone Audio, Inc.	Finalist	
2011 16th	Vengeance	AJ Scudiere	Kristoffer Tabori, Stephanie Zimbalist, and Don Leslie	Griffyn Ink	Finalist	
2011 16th	Dead Aim	Thomas Perry	Michael Kramer	Tantor Media	Finalist	
2012 17th	The Nightmare Thief (2012)	Meg Gardiner	Susan Ericksen	Brilliance Audio	Winner	
2012 17th	Adrenaline (2010)	Jeff Abbott	Kevin T. Collins	Hachette Audio	Finalist	
2012 17th	The Bone House (2011)	Brian Freeman	Joe Barrett	Blackstone Audio	Finalist	
2012 17th	A Kiss Before Dying (1953)	Ira Levin	Mauro Hantman	AudioGO	Finalist	
2012 17th	Silent Scream (2010)	Karen Rose	Marguerite Gavin	Blackstone Audio	Finalist	
2012 17th	Out of My Head (2003)	Didier Van Cauwelaert	Bronson Pinchot	Blackstone Audio	Finalist	
2013 18th	Red, White, and Blood: The President's Vampire (2012)	Christopher Farnsworth	Bronson Pinchot	Blackstone Audio	Winner	
2013 18th	The Boy in the Suitcase (2011)	Lene Kaaberbøl and Agnete Friis	Katherine Kellgren	AudioGO	Finalist	
2013 18th	The Chalk Girl (2012)	Carol O'Connell	Barbara Rosenblat	Recorded Books	Finalist	
2013 18th	Odd Apocalypse (2012)	Dean Koontz	David Aaron Baker	Brilliance Audio	Finalist	
2013 18th	Rise Again (2010)	Ben Tripp	Kirsten Potter	Tantor Audio	Finalist	
2014 19th	The Hit (2013)	David Baldacci	Ron McLarty and Orlagh Cassidy	Hachette Audio	Winner	
2014 19th	The Book of Obeah (2010)	Sandra Carrington-Smith	Dave Fennoy	Cherry Hill Publishing	Finalist	
2014 19th	The Fifth Assassin (2013)	Brad Meltzer	Scott Brick	Hachette Audio	Finalist	
2014 19th	Suspect (2013)	Robert Crais	MacLeod Andrews	Brilliance Audio	Finalist	
2014 19th	Sycamore Row (2013)	John Grisham	Michael Beck	Random House Audio/Books on Tape	Finalist	
2015 20th	Those Who Wish Me Dead (2014)	Michael Koryta	Robert Petkoff	Hachette Audio	Winner	
2015 20th	"Hot Snow" in The Avengers Lost Episodes (Vol. 1) (2014)	John Dorney	Full cast	Big Finish Productions	[]	
2015 20th	Dead Six (2013)	Larry Correia and Mike Kupari	Bronson Pinchot	Audible	Finalist	
2015 20th	In the Morning I'll Be Gone (2014)	Adrian McKinty	Gerard Doyle	Blackstone Audio	Finalist	
2015 20th	The Lost Key (2014)	Catherine Coulter and J. T. Ellison	Renee Raudman and MacLeod Andrews	Brilliance Audio	Finalist	
2015 20th	Wayfaring Stranger (2014)	James Lee Burke	Will Patton	Simon & Schuster Audio	Finalist	
2016 21st	The Patriot Threat: Cotton Malone (2015)	Steve Berry	Scott Brick	Macmillan Audio	Winner	
2016 21st	Blue Labyrinth (2014)	Douglas Preston and Lincoln Child	René Auberjonois	Hachette Audio	Finalist	
2016 21st	The President's Shadow (2015)	Brad Meltzer	Scott Brick	Hachette Audio	Finalist	
2016 21st	Season of Fear (2015)	Brian Freeman	Joe Barrett	Blackstone Audio	Finalist	
2016 21st	Signal (2015)	Patrick Lee	Ari Fliakos	Macmillan Audio	Finalist	
2017 22nd	Cross Justice (2015)	James Patterson	Ruben Santiago Hudson and Jefferson Mays	Hachette Audio	Winner	
2017 22nd	The Fall of Moscow Station (2016)	Mark Henshaw	Eric G. Dove	Dreamscape	Finalist	
2017 22nd	Hidden Bodies (2016)	Caroline Kepnes	Santino Fontana	Simon & Schuster Audio	Finalist	
2017 22nd	Home (2016)	Harlan Coben	Steven Weber	Brilliance Audio	Finalist	
2017 22nd	The Short Drop (2015)	Matthew FitzSimmons	James Patrick Cronin	Brilliance Audio	Finalist	
2018 23rd	The Fourth Monkey (2017)	J. D. Barker	Edoardo Ballerini and Graham Winton	Recorded Books	Winner	
2018 23rd	The Breakdown (2017)	B. A. Paris	Georgia Maguire	Macmillan Audio	Finalist	
2018 23rd	Don't Let Go (2017)	Harlan Coben	Steven Weber	Brilliance Audio	Finalist	
2018 23rd	The Chemist (2016)	Stephenie Meyer	Ellen Archer	Hachette Audio	Finalist	
2018 23rd	A Legacy of Spies (2017)	John le Carré	Tom Hollander	Penguin Audio	Finalist	
2018 23rd	Mississippi Blood (2017)	Greg Iles	Scott Brick	HarperAudio	Finalist	
2019 24th	Crimson Lake (2017)	Candice Fox	Euan Morton	Macmillan Audio	Winner	
2019 24th	The Death of Mrs Westaway (2018)	Ruth Ware	Imogen Church	Simon & Schuster Audio	Finalist	
2019 24th	Macbeth (2018)	Jo Nesbø	Euan Morton	Penguin Random House Audio	Finalist	
2019 24th	The Outsider (2018)	Stephen King	Will Patton	Simon & Schuster Audio	Finalist	
2019 24th	The Terminal List (2018)	Jack Carr	Ray Porter	Simon & Schuster Audio	Finalist	
2019 24th	Their Lost Daughters (2017)	Joy Ellis	Richard Armitage	Audible	Finalist	

=== 2020s ===
Year	Audiobook	Author(s)	Narrator(s)	Publisher	Result	Ref.
2020 25th	The Institute (2019)	Stephen King	Santino Fontana	Simon & Schuster Audio	Winner	
2020 25th	Blood in the Water (2016)	Jack Flynn	Dion Graham	Recorded Books	Finalist	
2020 25th	Freefall (2019)	Jessica Barry	Hillary Huber, Karissa Vacker, and MacLeod Andrews	HarperAudio	Finalist	
2020 25th	Lady in the Lake (2019)	Laura Lippman	Susan Bennett	HarperAudio	Finalist	
2020 25th	Winter Dark (2020)	Alex Callister	Ell Potter	Audible Originals	Finalist	
2021 26th	When No One Is Watching (2020)	Alyssa Cole	Susan Dalian and Jay Aaseng	HarperCollins Publishers	Winner	
2021 26th	If It Bleeds (2020)	Stephen King	Will Patton, Danny Burstein, and Steven Weber	Simon & Schuster Audio	Finalist	
2021 26th	The Only Good Indians (2020)	Stephen Graham Jones	Shaun Taylor-Corbett	Simon & Schuster Audio	Finalist	
2021 26th	The Sentinel (2020)	Lee Child and Andrew Child	Scott Brick	Penguin Random House Audio	Finalist	
2021 26th	Yard Work (2020)	David Koepp	Kevin Bacon	Audible Originals	Finalist	
2022 27th	Local Woman Missing	Mary Kubica	Brittany Pressley, Jennifer Jill Araya, Gary Tiedemann, and Jesse Vilinsky	HarperAudio	Winner	
2022 27th	The Last Thing He Told Me (2021)	Laura Dave	Rebecca Lowman	Simon & Schuster Audio	Finalist	
2022 27th	Never Far Away	Michael Koryta	Robert Petkoff	Hachette Audio	Finalist	
2022 27th	The Night She Disappeared	Lisa Jewell	Joanne Froggatt	Simon & Schuster Audio	Finalist	
2022 27th	Razorblade Tears (2021)	S. A. Cosby	Adam Lazarre-White	Macmillan Audio	Finalist	
2023 28th	Greenwich Park	Katherine Faulkner	Laura Kirman	Simon & Schuster Audio	Winner	
2023 28th	The Boys from Biloxi	John Grisham	Michael Beck	Penguin Random House Audio	Finalist	
2023 28th	The Island	Adrian McKinty	Mela Lee	Hachette Audio	Finalist	
2023 28th	The Paris Apartment	Lucy Foley	Clare Corbett, Daphne Kouma, Julia Winwood, Sope Dirisu, Sofia Zervudachi, and Charlie Anson	HarperAudio	Finalist	
2023 28th	Snowstorm in August	Marshall Karp	Chris Andrew Ciulla and Michael Manuel	Blackstone Audio	Finalist	
2023 28th	Where Secrets Live	S. C. Richards	Jennifer Jill Araya	Dreamscape Media	Finalist	
2024 29th	All the Sinners Bleed (2023)	S. A. Cosby	Adam Lazarre-White	Macmillan Audio	Winner	
2024 29th	The Woodkin	Alexander James	Alex Knox	CamCat Books	Finalist	
2024 29th	Bad Cree	Jessica Johns	Tanis Parenteau	Penguin Random House Audio	Finalist	
2024 29th	I Will Find You	Harlan Coben	Steven Weber	Brilliance Publishing	Finalist	
2024 29th	None of This Is True (2023)	Lisa Jewell	Nicola Walker, Louise Brealey, and a full cast	Simon & Schuster Audio	Finalist	
2025 30th	Lone Wolf	Gregg Hurwitz	Scott Brick	Macmillan Audio	Winner	
2025 30th	First Lie Wins	Ashley Elston	Saskia Maarleveld	Penguin Random House Audio	Finalist	
2025 30th	The Forest of Lost Souls	Dean Koontz	January LaVoy	Brilliance Publishing	Finalist	
2025 30th	The Little Drummer Girl (1983)	John le Carré	Adjoa Andoh	Dreamscape Media LLC	Finalist	
2025 30th	The Return of Ellie Black	Emiko Jean	Mizuo Peck, Tessa Albertson, and a full cast	Simon & Schuster Audio	Finalist	
2026 31st	Don't Let Him In (2025)	Lisa Jewell	Richard Armitage, Joanne Froggatt, Tamaryn Payne, Gemma Whelan, Louise Brealey, and Patience Tomlinson	Simon & Schuster Audio	Winner	
2026 31st	Beautiful Ugly (2025)	Alice Feeney	Richard Armitage and Tuppence Middleton	Macmillan Audio	Finalist	
2026 31st	Everyone Is Lying to You	Jo Piazza	Rachel F. Hirsch, Sarah Reny, Vas Eli, and Saskia Maarleveld	Penguin Random House Audio	Finalist	
2026 31st	Havoc	Christopher Bollen	Maggi-Meg Reed	HarperAudio	Finalist	
2026 31st	To Die For	David Baldacci	Zach Villa, Mela Lee, Cassandra Morris, Rena Marie Villano, Christine Lakin, Will Collyer, Kiff VandenHeuvel, and Erin Bennett	Hachette Audio	Finalist	
