= Harry Delf =

American comedian and playwright (1892–1964)

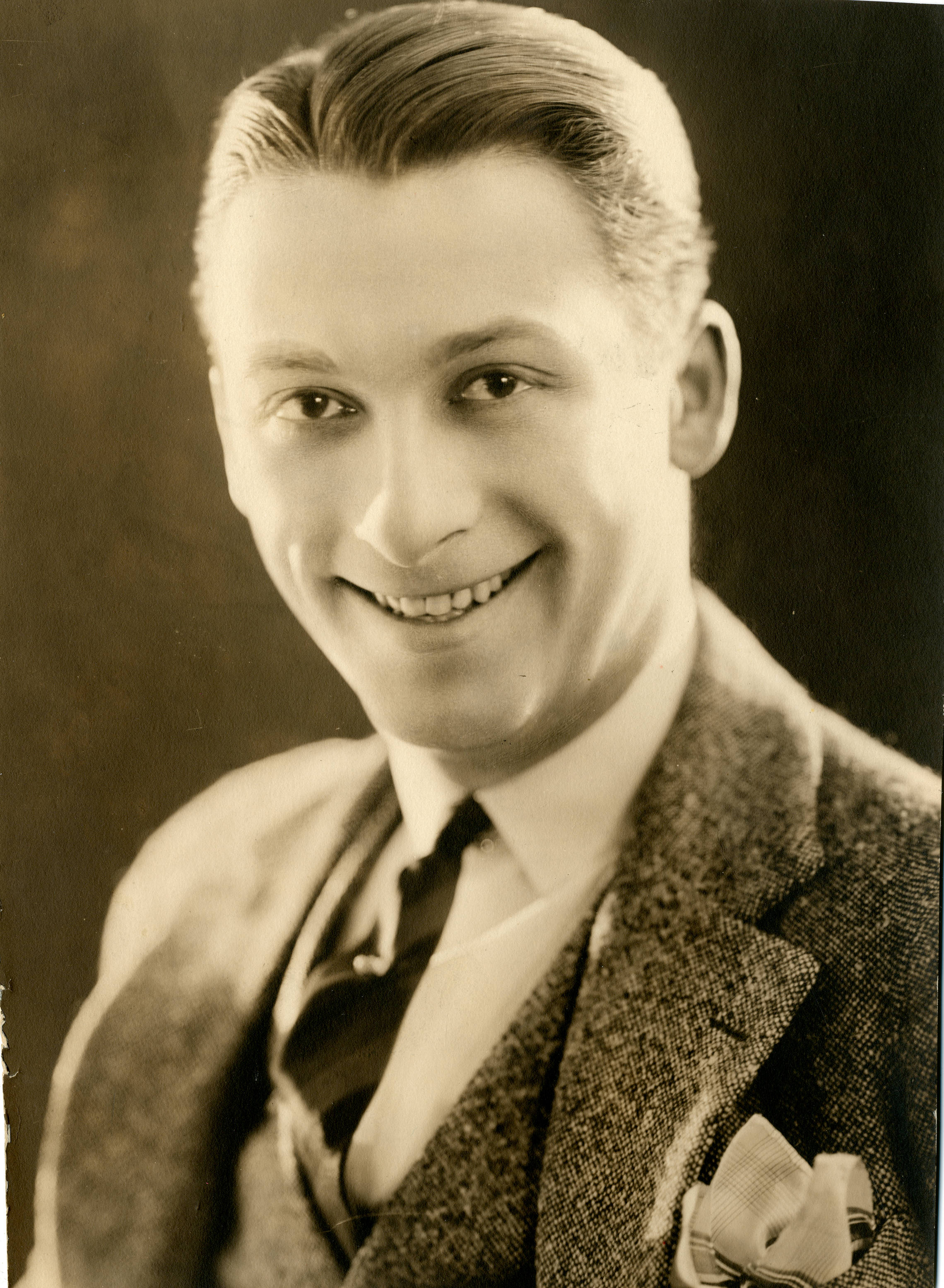
- Born: August 28, 1892; New York City, U.S.
- Died: February 7, 1964 (aged 71); Manhattan, New York City, U.S.
- Education: Columbia University
- Occupations: Comedian; actor; playwright; screenwriter; film director; theatrical producer; lyricist; composer
- Years active: 1914–1957
- Known for: The Family Upstairs (1925)

Harry Delf (August 28, 1892 – February 7, 1964) was an American comedian, stage actor, playwright, both a screen writer and director of short films, theatrical producer, and lyricist and composer for musicals. He is best remembered as the author of the play The Family Upstairs (1925), which has been staged on Broadway twice and adapted into a film multiple times. As a comedian and stage actor, he performed in vaudeville and on Broadway.

== Early life and education ==
Born in New York City, Delf was educated at Columbia University.

== Career ==
=== Vaudeville ===
He began his career as a comedian in vaudeville; performing on all of the major vaudeville circuits during his career. A Jewish comedian, he taught Fanny Brice how to speak with a Yiddish accent; a skill she frequently employed on the stage.

=== Broadway ===
In 1914, Delf made his Broadway debut as Pierre in the Sigmund Romberg and Harold Atteridge revue The Whirl of the World. His other Broadway credits as a performer included The Midnight Girl (1914, as Francois), The Cohan Revue of 1916 (1916, as Billie Holiday, Potter, Soldier), The Rainbow Girl (1918, as Ernest Bennett), The Greenwich Village Follies of 1919 (1919), Jimmie (1920, as Milton Blum), and Earl Carroll's Vanities of 1926. He also performed in some works on Broadway, which he had written. This included the role of Jerry Jackson in the 1923 musical Sun Showers for which Delf composed the music and wrote the lyrics and book; and the role of Elmer in the 1928 play Atlas and Eva for which Delf was both producer and playwright.

=== Playwriting ===
As a playwright, Delf's first work to reach Broadway was the 1918 musical Some Night! for which he composed the music and authored the lyrics and book. His most enduring work, the play The Family Upstairs, premiered on Broadway in 1925 and was revived in 1933. It was adapted into the silent film The Family Upstairs (1926) by the writer Gordon Rigby, and the sound films Harmony at Home (1930) and Stop, Look and Love (1939). His other plays include The Unsophisticates (1929) and She Lived Next to the Firehouse (1931). As a writer he also wrote sketches for the Cohan and Harris revues and the Earl Carroll's Vanities.

=== Film ===
Delf diversified his career into film beginning with the Fox Movietone short The Family Picnic (1928), which he both directed and served as screenwriter. He wrote and directed several more short films, including Mystery Mansion (1928) starring Sumner Gretchel, Toy Gallagher and Ford West, Meet the Family (1929), At the Photographer's (1929), Bring on the Bride (1929), and Hot Tips (1929).

== New York Friars Club ==
For a time, Delf was dean (equivalent to vice president) of the New York Friars Club and was instrumental in securing the organization's current premises at 57 East 55th Street in 1957. He was roasted by the Friars Club in 1951. A room at the club was named in his honor.

== Personal life ==
Delf died of a heart attack at his home in Manhattan on February 7, 1964.
