= Don't Let Him In =

2025 novel by Lisa Jewell

- Author: Lisa Jewell
- Audio read by: Richard Armitage, Joanne Froggatt, Tamaryn Payne, Gemma Whelan, Louise Brealey, and Patience Tomlinson
- Publisher: Atria Books
- Publication date: 24 June 2025
- Pages: 384
- ISBN: 978-1-668-03387-6

Don't Let Him In is a psychological thriller novel by British author Lisa Jewell, published 24 June 2025 by Atria. The novel centers around a psychopathic con man, the women who fall for his cons and those who work to uncover his secrets.

The audiobook is narrated by Richard Armitage, Joanne Froggatt, Tamaryn Payne, Gemma Whelan, Louise Brealey and Patience Tomlinson.

== Plot ==
Following the death of restaurateur Paddy Swann, who is pushed in front of a train by a disturbed homeless man, his family, consisting of his wife Nina and their children Ash and Arlo, struggle to cope with the aftermath. Several months later, Nina is contacted by Nick Radcliffe, who claims to have once worked with Paddy. By the one-year anniversary of Paddy's death they have started dating and Nick gradually inserts himself into the Swanns’ lives. Nina is drawn to him, while Ash immediately distrusts him. Although Nick appears generous and charming, Ash notices inconsistencies in his stories and behaviour and begins investigating him with the help of Jane Trevally, one of Paddy’s former partners. She uncovers evidence suggesting that many aspects of his identity are fabricated. Ash confronts her mother with the evidence but Nick is able to provide plausible explanations for all of it.

Meanwhile, Martha Grey, a florist, lives with her husband Alistair, their young daughter Nala and her two sons from her previous marriage. Alistair frequently disappears for days at a time under the pretence of work trips and does not respond to messages or calls. Martha initially accepts his explanations, but gradually becomes unsettled by his secrecy and increasingly implausible excuses.

Four years previously, Nick, under the name Jonathan Truscott, is living with his wife Tara. Nick is revealed to be a con man and a psychopath and is trying to convince Tara to sell her house so they can move to the Algarve but secretly plans to use the proceeds to invest in a wine bar with potential business partner Luke Berner. At the same time he is also secretly dating Martha under the name Alistair Grey and is planning to leave Tara once she sells the house. After Tara kicks him out after the police confront him over a stalking allegation, he turns to his first wife Amanda, who knows him as Damian Law and who thinks he's been dead for twenty years after he faked his death to abandon her and their two sons, leaving her with £90,000 worth of debt. He convinces her that he faked his death to protect her from dangerous people he owed money to and manipulates her into borrowing money to pay for treatment for a fictitious heart problem. He uses the money to take Martha on a weekend trip where they agree to move in together. After returning to Amanda he is confronted by Tara who followed him on his trip and took pictures of him with Martha. Before she can expose his lies he strangles her to death and convinces Amanda she is a violent stalker. They work together to dismember and bury Tara's body and fabricate alibies.

Two years after killing Tara, Nick takes Martha to one of Paddy's restaurants. He recognises Paddy from a past job and develops an obsessive hatred for him, resenting his success and wealth despite his working-class background in contrast to himself who grew up in a wealthy and privileged family until he was disinherited and now secretly works as a male escort to earn money and maintain his fabricated life to Martha. He begins to stalk the Swann family and becomes obsessed with ruining their lives.

Ash and Jane continue their investigation of Nick and track down several of his past victims including his second wife Laura who he was with while using the name Justin Warshaw and had two daughters with before abandoning her and leaving her with £15,000 worth of debt. They meet with Tara's daughter Emma who has been investigating Nick for four years since her mother disappeared and suspects he killed her. At the same time Martha does her own investigation into Alistair, discovering he has been embezzling from her business and suspects he is having an affair with Nina after a tracker she planted in his car shows him going to her house. When Nick realises this he hides at the home of one of his escort clients. Ash reveals the new evidence to Nina and is able to convince her of Nick's true nature. Together they confront Martha. Devasted by the truth about her husband, she agrees to help them expose Nick and bring him to justice.

Ash and Jane track down Nick and Amanda's son Sam, who reveals Amanda disappeared at the same time Tara did, making Ash and Jane suspect he killed her as well. They visit the wine bar Nick claimed to co-own and learn that Nick attempted to sabotage it after Luke rejected him as a business partner and eventually drove him to suicide. Alarmed by Nick's vindictive nature, Ash visits her father's murderer in prison and learns Nick manipulated him into killing Paddy.

Martha convinces Nick to return to her and lures him to an empty seaside property where Ash and Nina have gathered several of Nick's victims. After a violent confrontation, Nick runs into the sea and seemingly drowns. In the epilogue it is revealed he survived and escaped to the Algarve, where Amanda has been waiting for him since helping him cover up Tara's murder. She is still in love with Nick, but is no longer willing to cover for him and alerts the police. As Nick approaches her, she moves aside to allow the police to step out and arrest him.

== Style ==
Don't Let Him In is written from three perspectives: the man who goes by many names, Martha and Ash. It also jumps back and forth across time.

== Reception ==
Don't Let Him In is a New York Times bestseller.

Reviewers highlighted Jewell's ability to write a suspenseful story. Shelf Awareness's Elyse Dinh-McCrillis wrote that "pages will fly by as thriller fans race to see if an unctuous, toxic man gets his comeuppance", and Kirkus Reviews praised Jewell for being an "absolutely a genius at building suspense", but added that "but the 'man behaving badly' plot is getting tired".

Regarding the story structure, Publishers Weekly highlighted how "Jewell effortlessly toggles back and forth in time". Kirkus also discussed this aspect, adding, "Jewell’s cutting between past and present certainly allows revelations to ooze out at a slow, controlled pace; even as the reader makes obvious connections, the full picture remains obscure."

Reviewers also discussed character development. Dinh-McCrillis notes that "while the women are vulnerable to flattering male company and trust too easily, Jewell also depicts them as strong and capable". Kirkus similarly wrote, "Jewell has written some incredibly engaging and strong female characters", but asked, "What would it have been like to split the narrative between them instead of giving so much voice—and thus narrative power—to the male antagonist?"

The audiobook won the 2026 Audie Award for Thriller or Suspense.
