= Watching You =

Watching You may refer to:

- "Watching You" (Loose Ends song), 1988
- Watching You (novel), 2018 novel by Lisa Jewell
- "Watching You" (Rodney Atkins song), 2006
- "Watching You" (Rogue Traders song), 2006
- Watching You, a 2020 EP by Robinson, or the title track
- "Watching You", a song by Samantha Fox from the album 21st Century Fox (album)
- Watching You (TV series), an Australian drama
