= Annalise Appleton =

Fictional character from Hollyoaks

- Hollyoaks character
- Portrayed by: Tamaryn Payne
- Duration: 2011–13
- First appearance: 28 September 2011
- Last appearance: 18 February 2013
- Introduced by: Gareth Philips
In-universe information
- Occupation: Student; Public relations associate Event planner

Annalise Appleton is a fictional character from the British soap opera Hollyoaks, played by Tamaryn Payne. She made her first appearance on 28 September 2011, alongside her boyfriend Rob Edwards (David Atkins). Annalise was Payne's first big television role and she initially signed a six month contract. She had to complete four auditions for the role and moved to Liverpool for the role. Annalise and Rob were introduced with three other regular characters as university freshers that would begin studying at Hollyoaks Community College. The characters were promoted through university media and the soap opera. Hollyoaks wanted to show a realistic university experience through the characters, which included having them struggle to adapt to their lifestyle change. Annalise was characterised as being as being a perfectionist and controlling. Payne believed that Annalise was insecure but a good person despite coming across as annoying. Annalise disapproves of Rob's partying lifestyle and there is conflict between them, which Atkins believed reflected the real life experiences of new university students already in relationships. Annalise later breaks up with Rob and begins a romance and later relationship with Scott Sabeka (Calvin Demba). Annalise's other storylines have included her passion for event planning and her university life. Payne later left Hollyoaks alongside Atkins and their last appearance aired on 18 February 2013. Their exit storyline saw Rob and Annalise reunite and move to London together. Payne revealed that she decided to not renew her contract as whilst she enjoyed the character and being on Hollyoaks, she wanted to explore other acting projects. Critics also called Annalise a perfectionist.

== Casting and creation ==
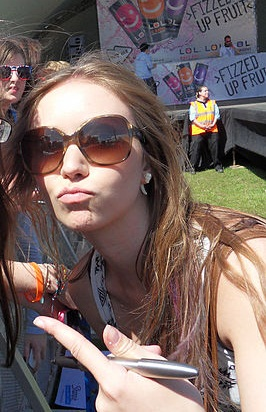
Tamaryn Payne (pictured) had to complete several auditions to secure the role.

In September 2011, it was announced that Hollyoaks would introduce five new regular cast members, all of whom would portray new "cool" freshers that would begin studying at Hollyoaks Community College alongside established characters. 22-year-old Tamaryn Payne was announced to be portraying the "beautiful perfectionist" Annalise. The five characters were announced prior to Payne's casting, which was reported later in September. In addition to Annalise, the other four characters to be announced were Rob Edwards (David Atkins), Scott Sabeka (Calvin Demba), Barney Harper-McBride (Tom Scurr) and Ash Kane (Holly Weston). New Hollyoaks executive producer, Emma Smithwick, revealed that the soap were trying to show a more "realistic portrayal of university life" through the five characters, with the characters adjusting to their new lifestyles and "the struggles it brings", with the characters seeming like "fish out of water at times". To promote the new characters, Digital Spy released a promo advertising them, whilst Payne and Weston were featured in a Pillow Magazine photoshoot. Student magazine Impact also published interviews with the five cast members. Promoting the new characters, Hollyoaks stated, "Possibly the coolest set of students ever to land in the Chester village, this year's Freshers are set to shake things up... Join them all as they live, love and learn life's hardest lessons in one of the wildest, most fun and cringe-worthy Freshers' weeks of all time". It was initially reported that Annalise would make her first appearance on 26 September, but she actually debuted two days later, along with Rob. Payne did not tell her family about the episode's broadcast as she wanted to watch it by herself before watching it with them afterwards.

Payne secured the role after auditioning for it, which she found "amazing" as she wanted to take the "next step" in her acting career. Payne did four auditions for the role, the first of which was in London and was a general audition, as the producers had not yet written Annalise's character but were planning to write some new student characters into the show, where Payne had to read some old scripts, and had to read for Steph Cunningham (Carley Stenson), which she found "funny". Payne had to travel to Liverpool three times for her other auditions, which she found "gruelling" and made her feel like she had earned the role at the end. Anna Passey, who would later go on to portray Sienna Blake in the soap opera, had also auditioned for Annalise and was "really disappointed" when she found that she had not been successful. Payne revealed that she would have wanted to secure a role in Skins had she not been successful in her Hollyoaks audition. Being on Hollyoaks was Payne's first major acting role. Following the announcement of Payne's casting, a lecturer from Bournemouth and Poole College, where Payne had studied, praised the actress, saying that the team were proud and it was "no surprise [Payne] is doing so well – she was always one to watch!" Payne moved to Liverpool for the role, which she enjoyed, and began filming in July 2011.

Payne initially signed a six-month contract for the show and did not what it meant when she was told that Annalise was a "regular". Payne teased that she and the other "Freshers" cast members were planning to do a Come Dine With Me special. Payne was a fan of Hollyoaks before she joined the cast and revealed to Bournemouth Echo that she used to watch it every day when she was younger, which made her more nervous about the role, and that she felt a bit "bit star struck" being on the set. She added that she hoped that being in Hollyoaks would raise her profile and get other people in the industry to recognise and respect her, which she believed would be a good thing. Speaking about working on a high-profile television series, she told Pillow Magazine, "I haven't really thought about [fame] much, and I probably should, James [Atherton] who plays Will was saying it's the fourth most watched programme or something. Crazy. It's literally like millions of people isn't it. Mental. I don't think I've got my head round it yet. I think it'll be a bit more of a reality when we're actually on telly and I'm getting all my friends saying, 'oh my God, I saw you', I don't know what it's going to be like yet, but just try and take it one stride". Payne added that she wanted to try to be responsible and set a good example in her private life due to Hollyoaks having a young viewer following.

== Characterisation ==
"Some people will get her because they would've experienced other people in halls, or wherever they live at university, there's always one person who's the 'grown-up'. She's like the mum of the house, even though she doesn't really want to be. I think people will either recognise her in themselves, or in someone they've been living with – I know I did as a student! There's always that person who wants to be clean – they make a rota and no-one sticks to it..."

— Payne on student viewer's reaction towards Annalise (2011)

Annalise was described as being beautiful and a "perfectionist" by Digital Spy. She was introduced to be studying Public Relations at Hollyoaks Community College and is the long-term girlfriend of Rob, who debuted in the same episode as her. Pillow Magazine also called Annalise a perfectionist and noted how she has moved in with Rob and "trying to be all grown up", only to realise that her boyfriend always wants to "go out and party". Annalise's official Hollyoaks character profile explained how Annalise is "thoroughly disapproving" of Rob's "non-stop" partying and that she is "determined to keep him on a tight leash. Hmm, good luck with that one..." They also wrote, "We'd better make sure there are no spelling mistakes in this because Annalise will not stand for it! The ultimate perfectionist, this well groomed PR student likes to keep things calm, organized and under (her) control - which is good in theory but difficult to achieve in the chaotic world of HCC". Payne revealed that Annalise is a bit insecure and that there is a "reason" why she gets very stressed. In order to further promote the five new characters, the British National Union of Students released a blog with advice for new university students from the five cast members. Payne wrote:

"Annalise's flatmates are her worst nightmare and 7 people living in halls is never going to guarantee you all get along. She's OCD and a bit of a princess but if anything she just mothers them all and most of them welcome that. Annalise is there to use everything the uni offers and get the most out of her experience and not on a social level which means she often clashes with her housemates. Wait it out, be patient and make an effort and soon enough everyone will get to know you in your own way. There are plenty of people in the same boat as you who move into halls so don't be afraid to make a complete fool of yourself, Annalise surely does!"

In an interview with the student magazine Impact, Payne revealed that Annalise puts a lot of pressure on herself to "be running every aspect of her life" and does not give herself much of a break. She attributed this to Annalise's family, as there is a lot of pressure on Annalise to do well as her sister is a "bit of a slacker". Payne revealed that Annalise is very insecure and tries to please people, which does not always make her the "happiest person". The actress believed that despite sometimes coming across as irritating, Annalise is a "really nice person", and hoped that new university students watching the show would empathise with the character. Payne added that Annalise has a cleaning obsession and is a "real clean freak around halls". Payne believed that Annalise is a control freak, but more to do with herself rather than others. When asked about Annalise's ambitions, Payne replied, "Bless her, she's only 18. I think it's a big, big dream. There's a reference to her wanting empires in London and Paris – she thinks about it all the time, whether it's going to become a reality or not is another matter I suppose". Payne also revealed that Annalise is a big fan of the British royal family and wants to be "immersed in that world", being part of their lifestyle and being associated with them. Payne later referred to Annalise as the kind of girl that viewers would laugh at.

== Development ==
Discussing Annalise and Rob's relationship, Payne explained that Annalise is trying to "mould" Rob into being her perfect man but is not succeeding very well. The actress explained that it is a bit of a "struggle", as Annalise wants to control Rob and "keep him on a bit of a leash", as he likes going out drinking and being with his friends, but she also wants him to be happy and does not want to push him away. Atkins believed that Annalise does a lot for Rob and can be quite controlling, and that she is the reason that he is at university. When asked if he believed that there would be fireworks between Annalise and Rob due to Annalise not approving of his lifestyle, Atkins replied, "There's definitely the potential. It's like any relationship. Uni is your coming-of-age, figuring out the world for what it really is. Being in a relationship at that time...in some ways it's a good thing, but in other ways it can be quite restricting. Giving each other space is important, but being in the same halls makes it difficult". Atkins believed that Annalise and Rob's relationship troubles would reflect the experiences of people who begin university whilst already in a long-term relationship.

In February 2012, it was reported that Annalise and Rob would split up. The break-up aired the following month. In the storyline, Scott – Rob's close friend who has been "pining after Annalise" for months – tells Annalise about his feelings towards, which stuns her. When he tells her to choose between him and Rob, Annalise is confused and cooks Rob a meal. However, she snaps and breaks up with Rob when he tells her that he has been dropped from his rugby team. Annalise is upset and "throws herself into her studies". Determined to prove that he is over Annalise, Rob immediately tries to move on by flirting with Theresa McQueen (Jorgie Porter), which does not go well. Rob feels like an "idiot" after trying to move on from Annalise and admits that he still cares about Annalise and is regretting the split. Around the same time, Annalise attends a business contest with Ste Hay (Kieron Richardson), Doug Carter (P. J. Brennan) and Cheryl Brady (Bronagh Waugh), which Annalise gives Cheryl a makeover for to remind her that presentation is important. Waugh revealed that Annalise's actions would impact her character, explaining, "Annalise helps to smarten Cheryl up and make her look a bit more business-like and professional. This might be the start of seeing a more mature and grown-up Cheryl".

Despite their feelings for each other, Annalise and Scott do not become a couple for "some time". Scott's portrayer, Calvin Demba, revealed that the episodes that explored Scott's "turbulent time" in his London home would be a turning point for his romance with Annalise, as it gives him a different attitude and makes him realise he needs to "seize the day" and sort out what is happening between him and Annalise "once and for all" when he returns to Hollyoaks, with the actor teasing that Scott means "business" as he needs to "man up" and "start facing his problems head-on". Demba explained that Scott is prepared that acting on his feelings may make Rob unhappy, adding, "I think Rob is always a factor that looms in Scott's head, and it must be the same for Annalise. But this has gone on for quite a while now. There's been lots of looks between Scott and Annalise, and they've flirted quite outrageously at certain points! I think it's going to have to come to a head...Scott sees that something is out there for him, and if he's got to upset Rob a little bit, then that's just how it's got to be". Demba also teased that Scott would fight for Annalise. Demba believed that Scott would be a relaxed boyfriend to Annalise, but joked that he did know whether Scott would "wear the trousers" in the relationship. The actor added, "If Scott has to pull up his socks for a girl, he will!" Scott ends up "laying his heart on the line" and tells Annalise how he feels about her. Despite having feelings for him, Annalise initially rejects Scott and says that she does not want the same thing, which leads Scott going to London to "mend his broken heart". After encouragement from Ash, Annalise realises she has made a mistake and goes after Scott in London, where she professes that she loves him too, which makes Scott very happy. However, Inside Soap questioned whether they would be able to make their relationship work. Despite the scenes being set in London, Payne did not travel there and filmed her scenes in the soap opera's Liverpool set, although other cast members did for certain scenes.

Payne later left Hollyoaks and last appeared on 18 February 2013, which also marked the last appearance of Atkins as Rob. In the episode, Rob is impressed by Annalise's new look following her return from her work placement. Rob ""struggles to contain his emotions" and Annalise announces that she has a new job in London. Barney encourages Rob to tell Annalise that he still loves her, which he does, and they leave Hollyoaks together. Payne and Atkins' departure had been announced prior to the broadcast of the episode. Payne revealed that she had chosen not to renew her contract, which was not easy, but she believed that she wanted to work on other project, which she thought was a good decision. She was happy that the door had been left open for Annalise to return. Payne also called Annalise "amazing to play" and "so much fun" and revealed that she missed playing her and working with her co-stars. In 2014, Payne revealed that she missed the people from Hollyoaks, calling the soap "much fun and Annalise was a brilliant character"; however, she added that whilst she would not rule out a return to the soap, it was not in her plans as she was "loving" working on a variety of projects. Payne later told The Escapist that when she was at the end of her contract on the soap, she had wanted to "branch out" in playing other characters. Years later, Payne worked with her Hollyoaks co-star, Neil Newbon (Simon Walker), again in the video game Baldur's Gate 3.

== Storylines ==
Annalise arrives as a new student of Hollyoaks Community College with her boyfriend Rob Edwards (David Atkins), where she meets her new flatmates Scott Sabeka (Calvin Denba), Will Savage (James Atherton) and Barney Harper-McBride (Tom Scurr). Annalise becomes irritated with Rob when he dares another new student, Ash Kane (Holly Weston), to strip in front of the crowd in the Students Union Bar. Annalise becomes annoyed with Rob's constant partying and accuses him of not caring about her when he forgets about his plans with her, which leads her to forcing him to sleep on the sofa. When Rob forgets about their second anniversary, he makes it up to her by allowing her to organise a party at the SU bar, which she enjoys. She becomes fixated on making the party run smoothly and asks Rob to make some invitations. When she finds out that Scott has actually made them, the pair bond and Annalise tells him about her relationship troubles and that she believes that Rob is treating her unfairly. Rob does not turn up to their anniversary party and when he does not appear again, Annalise talks to Scott about her problems and they almost kiss. However, Annalise feels guilty when she finds out that Rob has been run over and she rushes to his side.

Annalise's feelings for Scott grow. After an argument with Rob, Annalise breaks up with him and decides to stay single. She helps Cheryl Brady (Bronagh Waugh) on a sales pitch, which is unsuccessful, and gives her a makeover. Cheryl tells Annalise that she needs to enjoy herself more and not please others. Annalise is annoyed when Rob sleeps with other women but they stop arguing. Wanting male attention, Annalise goes to a party and meets Joel Dexter (Andrew Still), who thinks that she is uptight. The pair have sex and Annalise reveals that it is her first one-night stand. Ash convinces Annalise to be open about her true feelings and so she and Scott finally become a couple. They plan to get a flat together when the other students move out of the halls, but they realise that they will not work out and Scott leaves to live for Thailand. Annalise later helps organise a wedding but that goes wrong when there is a bus crash that she is caught up in. She also works with sisters Mitzeee (Rachel Shenton) and Maxine Minniver (Nikki Sanderson) and gives them new business ideas. Annalise later goes for a work placement and when she returns she announces that she has a new job in London. Rob tells her that he still loves her and they leave Hollyoaks for London.

== Reception ==
Prior to Annalise's debut, Daniel Kilkelly from Digital Spy speculated that the new Freshers would be having fun and partying based on their promo. Kilkelly also called Annalise "beautiful" and a "perfectionist". In April 2012, Kilkelly wrote that Annalise and Scott had not shown any signs of "becoming a proper couple" despite having feelings for each other for a long time. Kilkelly also believed that Scott being friends with Rob could complicate his potential romance with Annalise. A writer from Pillow Magazine called Annalise a perfectionist. Stephen Bailey from Bournemouth Echo called Annalise a "highly-strung perfectionist". Tom Grater from Impact believed that Annalise was a "complete perfectionist" and possible "control freak" based on her profile. Laura Morgan from All About Soap called Annalise a "pampered princess". A writer from Inside Soap wrote that Annalise initially "cruelly" rejected Scott after his declaration of love and, believed that it was "clear" that she was hiding her true feelings from him.
