= Vince and Joy =

2005 novel by Lisa Jewell

- First edition (publ. Penguin Books)
- Author: Lisa Jewell
- Language: English
- Publication place: United Kingdom

Vince and Joy is the fifth novel written by Lisa Jewell and published in 2005. Like her previous books, it focuses on the trials and tribulations of relationships.

== Plot ==
In 2003, Vince tells his friends a story about Joy.

In July 1986, Vince and Joy meet at a holiday camp and are attracted to each other while in their late teens. Vince told Joy he had a really bad underbite and that his mother was married to his stepfather, Chris. The following morning, Joy and her family have suddenly vanished, leaving only a note in ink on the step of Vince's caravan. Due to the rain, all he can make out on the paper is, "I feel so ashamed." Vince is angry and upset that she has gone without leaving any way for him to get in contact with her.

In September 1993, Vince has a girlfriend, Magda. He looks for a new roommate and offers the room to a superstitious woman called Cassandra McAfee. Cassandra has a cat called Madeleine who goes into Joy's house, so she follows the cat into Joy's house. On the other side of the story, Joy meets George Pole on a blind date. They eventually move in together, just before Cassandra storms into their house after the cat. The only people left are Julia, Joy's friend and Bella, a gay man. Cassandra finds out that there was a woman called Joy who used to live there and thinks it can only be fate. Joy catches sight of Vince in Oxford Street while on the bus, but does not get to meet him. At the end of this section, Vince also sees Joy going into a church ready to get married, but he does not talk to her.

In 1999, Vince is now with longtime girlfriend Jess, who he discovers is having an affair. Joy is trapped in a loveless marriage with George, who dominates her and does not allow her to have a life of her own. She eventually breaks free and she and Vince meet again in 2001, when they talk about what has happened. In April 2003, Vince finishes telling his friends the story and they advise him to find Joy. The happy ending occurs in October 2003 when, after running into an old friend of Joy's, Vince is encouraged to see her and is given her address. The novel ends before they meet again.

== Reviews ==
In The Daily Telegraph, Lloyd Evans wrote that the novel was "Jewell's most satisfying novel since her wonderful debut Ralph's Party." A reviewer in The Sunday Times had a favourable impression of the novel and also compared it with Jewell's previous novel Ralph's Party.
