= Then She Was Gone =

Suspense novel by Lisa Jewell

- Author: Lisa Jewell
- Audio read by: Helen Duff
- Publisher: Atria Books
- Publication date: 24 April 2018
- Pages: 368
- ISBN: 978-1-5011-5464-5

Then She Was Gone is a suspense novel by British author Lisa Jewell, published 24 April 2018 by Atria. The audiobook is narrated by Helen Duff.

== Plot ==
Then She Was Gone primarily follows Laurel, a mother whose 15-year-old daughter, Ellie, disappeared. Following Ellie's disappearance, Laurel's relationship with her husband and two other children weakened, ultimately leading to divorce.

Ten years after Ellie's disappearance, her remains are found, and a funeral is held. Laurel meets and begins dating a charming man named Floyd but is startled when she meets his young daughter Poppy, who resembles Ellie in both appearance and mannerisms. The oddity surrounding Poppy escalates as Laurel learns more about Poppy's mother, who appears to have had a connection with Ellie.

== Characters ==
- Laurel Mack: a primary character, Ellie's mother
- Paul Mack: Laurel's ex-husband
- Ellie Mack: Laurel's daughter, who disappeared
- Hanna Mack: Laurel's other daughter
- Jake Mack: Laurel's son
- Floyd: Laurel's new boyfriend
- Poppy: Floyd's daughter
- Theo: Ellie's schooltime boyfriend

== Style ==
Then She Was Gone is separated into three sections. The first alternates timelines "between the time of Ellie’s disappearance and the present", while the second section "begins as Laurel and Floyd meet". The final section alternates between narrators, including first-person narration from Floyd and Poppy's mother, as well as "third-person narration of Ellie’s experiences and Laurel’s discoveries in the present".

== Reception ==
Maggie Boyd, writing for All About Romance, called Then She Was Gone "a near-perfect novel of suspense", while Shelf Awareness's Jessica Howard similarly called it "a nearly pitch-perfect thriller", comparing the novel to the works of Gillian Flynn, Paula Hawkins and Ruth Ware.

Kirkus Reviews referred to the novel as "dark and unsettling", while focusing their critique on the novel's structure, highlighting how the alternating timelines and perspectives "serve to build palpable tension", while "contribut[ing] to how deeply disturbing the story becomes."

Publishers Weekly described Then She Was Gone as a "gripping novel transcends its plot improbabilities to connect with an emotionally resonant story of loss, grief, and renewal".

Boyd stated that her "one quibble is a slightly saccharine ending". Kirkus Reviews added that the "novel’s end arrives abruptly even as readers are still moving at a breakneck speed."

== Film adaptation ==
In 2024, Netflix purchased the film rights to Jewell's 2018 novel, Then She Was Gone. The novel is being adapted by British actress Catherine Steadman and produced by Crystal City Entertainment and Moonshot Films.
