= Invisible Girl (novel) =

2020 thriller novel by Lisa Jewell

- Author: Lisa Jewell
- Audio read by: Donna Banya, Katherine Kelly, and Connor Swindells
- Genre: Mystery; Psychological thriller
- Publisher: Atria Books
- Publication date: 13 October 2020
- Pages: 368
- ISBN: 978-1-982137-33-5

Invisible Girl is a psychological thriller novel by British author Lisa Jewell, published 13 October 2020 by Atria Books. The audiobook is narrated by Donna Banya, Katherine Kelly, and Connor Swindells.

== Plot ==
Told from three perspectives, Invisible Girl follows Owen Pick, Saffyre Maddox, and Cate Fours as their worlds unexpectedly collide.

At 33 years old, Owen is a virgin who lives with his aunt while initially teaching computer science. After losing his job due to a claim of sexism, he find himself on incel websites before deciding to try socializing and entering the dating scene. Across the street, 52-year-old Cate Fours lives with husband and two teenage children, who all find Owen to be off-putting. Meanwhile, 17-year-old Saffyre suffered a trauma at age ten. To cope with the trauma, she self-harms and attends therapy with Roan Fours (Cate's husband), who decides after three years that it is time to end their therapy sessions, even though Saffyre has yet to share the truth about her trauma. Once their sessions conclude, she begins stalking him and planning her revenge.

After a series of sexual assaults in the neighborhood, Cate brings the police to Owen's door. Suspicion grows when Saffyre goes missing.

== Characters ==
- Saffyre Maddox: 17-year-old young woman who experienced a trauma earlier in life and was in therapy with Dr. Roan Fours
- Owen Pick: 33-year-old socially-isolated man who worked as a computer science teacher and lived with his aunt
- Cate Fours: 52-year-old stay at home mom
- Roan Fours: Cate's husband, who was Saffyre's therapist
- Georgia Fours: Cate and Roan's teenaged daughter, who finds Owen creepy
- Josh Fours: Cate and Roan's teenaged son

== Themes ==
Invisible Girls explores topics related to self-harm, sexual assault, and the incel community.

== Censorship ==
In 2022, Invisible Girl was banned from high school libraries in the Wentzville School District after the district was sued, though the ban was later overturned.

== Reception ==
Leslie Chatman, writing for Criminal Element, described the novel as "a tangled, riveting, thought-provoking psychological thriller", with "a skillfully intertwined collection of tragic circumstances that reminds us all that looks can be deceiving and that sometimes criminals hide in plain sight". Publishers Weekly provided a more critical review, noting that the "facile plotting, underdeveloped characters, and unconvincing stakes mar this disappointing domestic thriller".

Plotting and character development were often discussed throughout reviews. Regarding plot development, Chatman discussed how "Jewell is skillful at delicately weaving multiple, complicated plotlines". That said, Chatman agreed that "there are times that the story lags a bit with elements that are more confusing, that muddle the story rather than help to move it along". Kirkus Reviews referred to the novel as "a lackluster and underdeveloped story." They specifically noted that "he themes of sexual assault and incel culture are only marginally developed despite the key part each plays in the story."

In terms of character, Chatman highlighted how Jewell's use of "unreliable narrators [...] keeps the story alive and allows the reader to quickly form opinions about them individually," while also noting that Jewell "tak[es] time to develop shockingly real characters. Kirkus added that the characters lacked "emotional depth or unique narrative voices" and "are only superficially realized". Conversely, in a starred review, Library Journal's Natalie Browning highlighted how the alternating perspectives provide details about "each character’s distinct personality. In Saffyre, Jewell creates a sarcastic and poetic character, while Cate is suspicious and prone to heavy dialog instead of introspection. Owen’s chapters ensure that readers find him odd yet also feel sympathy for him."

Kirkus positively reviewed the audiobook narrated by Donna Banya, Katherine Kelly, and Connor Swindells, noting that the narrators "keep listeners engrossed". They added that "the narrators' skill with U.K. regional accents makes it easy to follow who's speaking, and their mastery of tone and pitch somehow manages to evoke high drama even when the plot dodders."
