= None of This Is True =

2023 thriller novel

- Author: Lisa Jewell
- Audio read by: Nicola Walker, Louise Brealey, Kristin Atherton, Ayesha Antoine, Alix Dunmore, Elliot Fitzpatrick, Lisa Jewell, Thomas Judd, Dominic Thorburn, and Jenny Walser
- Genre: Thriller
- Publication date: 2023
- Pages: 380
- ISBN: 1982179007

None of This is True is a 2023 thriller written by British author Lisa Jewell. The audiobook is narrated by a full cast, including Nicola Walker, Louise Brealey, Kristin Atherton, Ayesha Antoine, Alix Dunmore, Elliot Fitzpatrick, Lisa Jewell, Thomas Judd, Dominic Thorburn, and Jenny Walser.

The book follows the story of Alix Summer, a popular podcaster, and Josie Fair, a woman with a painful and shadowed history who wants her story told.

== Premise ==
Josie Fair and Alix Summer share a birthday. They were also born in the same hospital on the same day, and now, at the age of forty-five, they share a curiosity about how their lives might have turned out differently.

Since she was a teenager, Josie has been controlled by a husband nearly thirty years her senior. After meeting Alix by chance on their shared birthday, she decides there are parts of her story that must be told. Alix, meanwhile, has hit a creative roadblock with her popular podcast and, amid frustrations with her husband's drinking, decides to take a chance on Josie's tale. The more Alix hears, however, the darker the story becomes, and the closer that darkness comes to her own doorstep.

The story is told through a combination of present-tense prose, interview transcripts, and scenes from a fictional Netflix documentary about the book's events.

== Plot ==
Josie Fair and Alix Summer meet by chance at a local pub while both celebrating their forty-fifth birthday. Josie speaks to Alix in the bathroom, introducing herself as Alix's birthday twin, and learn they were both born at the same hospital as well. Josie has been married to Walter Fair, a man twenty-seven years her senior, for nearly all her life, and begins to yearn for something different while watching the social and popular Alix. Alix is a podcast host for a series called "All Woman" where she interviews women about their success stories, but has grown bored of the series and wants to try something new. A week later, Josie intercepts Alix at her children's school and convinces her to interview her for Alix's next project, saying she wants to make changes to the life she's been living for several years and wants Alix to document her progress.

The facts of Josie's life quickly become troubling to Alix, but she senses that her interviews with Josie might result in a career-defining story. Josie met her husband, Walter Fair, when she was just thirteen years old, began an affair with him at sixteen, then married him at nineteen. Erin, their elder daughter, is now in her twenties and stays at home playing video games, refusing to leave her room or eat anything except baby food. Their younger daughter, Roxy, had a violent record in school, ran away at sixteen, and has not been seen since. Josie quickly becomes obsessed with Alix and steals items of sentimental value during visits to her house.

Despite Alix's misgivings and Josie's growing attachment to her, Alix continues to interview her for the podcast and opens up about her own problems with her husband, Nathan Summer, who is outwardly loving and charismatic and a successful office estate agent but has become increasingly irresponsible and shows signs of alcoholism, regularly going on benders and staying in hotels rather than coming home. This makes Josie start to compare their lives and develop an obsessive hatred for Nathan and resent Alix for still loving him. Her story becomes even darker, with details about Walter grooming and having sex with Brooke Ripley, one of Roxy's high school friends, and sexually abusing his own daughter Erin. At the same time, Josie becomes more hostile and resentful to Walter and tries to convince Alix that her life would be better off without Nathan.

Alix asks if she can meet Walter, hoping he will agree to contribute to the podcast. Alix and Nathan invite Josie and Walter to dinner at their home, but Nathan gets drunk and does not appear and Josie insults him to Alix. While showing Walter her recording studio, he attempts to warn Alix about Josie's controlling and manipulative behaviour and tendency to misrepresent the truth, but Alix dismisses this as an attempt to deceive her. After she and Walter leave, Josie feels angry and humiliated, believing Alix could have been a better host and disgusted by Nathan's alcoholism. She argues with Walter, threatening to unveil his secrets to Alix. In the early morning of the same day, she appears back at Alix's house with blood on her clothes claiming Walter attacked her prompting her and Erin to flee.

Josie refuses to call the police or her mother for help, insisting she'd feel safest with Alix. Reluctantly, Alix lets Josie stay at her house to recover. As they continue the interviews, however, parts of Josie's stories begin to fall apart and Alix is unnerved by Josie's apparent contentment and lack of concern for Erin's wellbeing despite her lack of independence. Alix learns that Brooke disappeared around the time Roxy ran away. Josie's presence in Alix's house also frustrates Nathan, who Josie is openly hostile towards and blames for the incident, claiming his absence embarrassed Walter and made him take his anger out on her. Though Josie tries to stay longer, she agrees to leave after a week due to Alix's sisters coming to stay. Believing Alix deserves better than Nathan, Josie secretly withdraws large amounts of cash from Erin's bank account, which Erin earned as a gaming streamer, as part of a plan to convince Alix to leave him.

The day after Josie leaves, Nathan goes out with some friends then disappears. Though initially assuming he went on another bender, Alix later receives a call from a hotel Nathan checked into which was paid for online with Erin's card. After viewing CCTV footage showing Nathan entering a car rented with Erin's card as well, Alix realises that he was kidnapped by Josie. Desperate to find Nathan, Alix calls the police, who break into Josie and Walter's flat and discover Walter dead and a barely alive Erin trapped in a closet. Roxy, Josie's missing daughter, also appears and tells a new side of the story on Alix's podcast. Roxy reveals that no abuse from Walter ever occurred; in fact Josie was a controlling and abusive mother. Roxy also reveals that she and Brooke were in a relationship before she disappeared and that Josie was jealous because of how much Roxy liked her. Josie's mother Pat also contributes to the podcast to discuss Josie's difficult childhood and history of anti-social behaviour and pettiness. She reveals that Josie sabotaged any relationship she had until she started dating Walter, who Josie secretly convinced to be with her instead. She denies that Walter groomed Josie like she claimed and corroborates Walter and Roxy's claims of Josie being manipulative and controlling. Shocked by Josie's true nature, Alix fears that she intends to kill Nathan in a misguided attempt to help Alix.

After a nationwide manhunt, Josie is tracked down to a holiday park in Ambleside, where Nathan is discovered dead in a lake in front of a lodge where Josie kept him prisoner. Josie is not caught and sends Alix a voice message insisting that killing Nathan with an overdose of sedative had been an accident and she had been planning to only hold him prisoner for a few days to help her see how much better her life would be without him. She begs Alix to tell the world she's a good person before going on the run. Brooke's body is later discovered in the back of a Morris Minor kept in a garage behind Walter and Josie's flat. After recovering, Erin claims that Josie murdered Brooke in a fit of rage after blaming her for Roxy running away.

After Nathan's funeral, a heartbroken Alix uses the hours of audio interviews at her disposal to create the podcast series during the COVID-19 pandemic, earning money for her family after Nathan's death and attempting to break through Josie's psychosis. She eventually sells the rights to the podcast to a US production company to have it turned into a Netflix documentary titled "Hi, I'm Your Birthday Twin!". In her final episode, recorded on the one-year anniversary of Nathan's funeral, Alix expresses her frustration at Josie having not been caught and denounces her as an evil person. While on the run, Josie sends a final letter to Alix, berating her for turning her story into a true crime documentary, reiterates she had been trying to help her and insists all the awful things people have said about her are lies.

Sixteen months later, A disguised Josie sits on a bus and overhears a conversation about the podcast and remembers the night Brooke died. Josie's recollection is that Roxy killed Brooke in a violent outburst and that she and Walter covered up the death in order to protect her. When Josie threatened to reveal this to Alix it caused Walter to have a fatal heart attack. She insists to herself that this is what really happened and that she is a good person.

Bonus Chapter

In a bonus chapter released by Lisa Jewell, told from Erin's perspective, it is revealed that Erin and Roxy now live together in a new-build house. The relationship between the sisters is tense due to Erin's neediness and Roxy's volatile temper. After watching every episode of "Hi, I'm Your Birthday Twin!" in one sitting, Erin feels uncomfortable about lying about Brooke's death, recalling when she witnessed Roxy strangle Brooke to death in a fit of rage because she went to prom without her and how Josie and Walter hid her body and covered up her death. The trauma of the incident causes Erin to isolate herself in her room for five years out of fear of her family. Erin admits she regrets doing the show, fearing their lies will be exposed if Josie is caught but Roxy is confident no one will believe her, showing no remorse for letting the world believe Josie killed Brooke. After annoying Roxy until she leaves the room, Erin begins secretly writing a message to Alix, telling her she needs to make a new show.

== Characters ==
- Josie Fair — The wife of Walter Fair, whom she married when she was nineteen, and the mother of Erin and Roxy Fair.
- Alix Summer — A popular podcast host, the wife of Nathan Summer and the mother of Eliza and Leon Summer.
- Walter Fair — The husband of Josie Fair, whom he married when he was forty-six and the father of Erin and Roxy Fair. He has two older sons with his first wife, who all moved to Canada when he left her for Josie.
- Nathan Summer — An office estate agent, the husband of Alix Summer and the father of Eliza and Leon Summer.
- Erin Fair — A reclusive gaming streamer and the older daughter of Walter and Josie Fair.
- Roxy Fair — The younger daughter of Walter and Josie Fair who has anger and violence issues.
- Pat O'Neill - Josie's narcissistic mother, who manages the estate she and Josie lived on.
- Brooke Ripley — A high-school friend and ex-girlfriend of Roxy's, who's been missing for five years.
- Maxine and Zoe - Alix's sisters.
- Eliza Summer - The older daughter of Alix and Nathan Summer.
- Leon Summer - The younger son of Alix and Nathan Summer.
- Katelyn Rand - an aspiring actress and former neighbour of Josie, who uses her as part of her plan to kidnap Nathan.

== Background ==
Jewell has stated she came up with the idea for None of This Is True one day while walking her dog and seeing a man sitting in a window. She named him Walter Fair and quickly began developing his character. She wrote None of This Is True within five months, her quickest turn around from idea to completion.

The character Giovanni, one of Nathan's friends, was selected from an auction to raise funds for Young Lives vs Cancer.

== Reception ==
=== Reviews ===
None of This Is True was largely well received by critics. Critics appreciated the novel's pacing and plot twists, but noted the darkness of the book's plot and themes. Publishers Weekly stated that fans of Jewell's work "will be satisfied by this pitch-black outing and its shocking climax, but readers with a lower tolerance for nastiness should turn elsewhere." Likewise, Kirkus Reviews noted that the book was "hard to read but hard to look away from."

The audiobook narrated by a full cast was also well received. The Guardian described the book as "deftly plotted" and "gripping." AudioFile gave the audiobook their Earphones Award, calling the audiobook "a riveting and cinematic listen". They highlighted how Walker and Brealey "both embody their characters in a way that drives the story forward and makes the novel seem frighteningly believable", while the additional narrators "add even more drama as the plot twists and turns".

=== Awards and honors ===
Awards for None of This Is True
| Year | Award | Result | Ref. |
|---|---|---|---|
| 2024 | Audie Award for Audio Drama | Shortlist | |
| 2024 | Audie Award for Thriller or Suspense | Shortlist | |
| 2024 | British Book Award for Crime & Thriller | Winner | |
| 2024 | British Book Award for Fiction Audiobook | Winner | |
| 2024 | Theakston Old Peculier Crime Novel of the Year Award | Shortlist | |
| 2024 | TikTok Book Awards U.K. and Ireland for Book of the Year | Winner | |

== Film adaptation ==
In 2024, Netflix purchased the film rights to None of This Is True. The novel is being adapted by Eleanor Burgess and produced by Something Happy Productions and Modern Magic, with Jewell serving as executive producer.
