= The Family Upstairs (novel) =

2019 novel by Lisa Jewell

- Author: Lisa Jewell
- Audio read by: Tamaryn Payne, Bea Holland, Dominic Thorburn
- Publisher: Atria Books
- Publication date: 5 November 2019
- Pages: 320
- ISBN: 978-1-5011-9010-0

The Family Upstairs is a thriller novel by British author Lisa Jewell, published 5 November 2019 by Atria. The audiobook is narrated by Tamaryn Payne, Bea Holland, Dominic Thorburn.

== Plot ==
The novel alternates between two principal time periods: the present day, following Libby Jones and Lucy Lamb in 2019, and a series of flashbacks narrated by Henry Lamb that reveal events at a Chelsea mansion between 1988 and 1994.

Shortly after her twenty-fifth birthday, Libby Jones learns that she has inherited a large townhouse in Chelsea, London. Adopted as an infant, Libby knows little about her biological family. She discovers that she was found alive in the house as a baby after police uncovered the bodies of three adults, including her birth parents Henry Sr. and Martina Lamb, who had apparently died in a collective suicide and her birth name was Serenity Lamb. Her two older siblings, Henry and Lucy, disappeared at the same time the bodies were discovered and have not been seen since as neither came forward to claim the house. Intrigued by the circumstances surrounding her inheritance, Libby begins investigating the history of the house with journalist Miller Roe, who had previously reported on the case.

At the same time, Lucy Lamb, now a homeless musician living in southern France, learns that the baby she was separated from has turned twenty-five and inherited the house. Determined to find her, Lucy resolves to return to England with her two children. With no money or passports, she is forced to turn to her abusive ex-husband Michael, who provides Lucy with false passports but attempts to violently rape her and she kills him in self-defence. Knowing she's in France illegally, she hides Michael's body, steals several thousand euros and departs for England before his maid discovers his body.

The flashback narrative follows Henry Lamb's childhood in the Chelsea mansion. Henry and his sister Lucy initially live comfortably with their wealthy parents, Henry Sr. and Martina Lamb. Their lives change when Birdie, a free-spirited musician, and her partner Justin are invited to stay in the house. When Henry Sr. suffers a stroke, Birdie introduces David Thomsen, a charismatic but manipulative physiotherapist, who moves into the house with his family consisting of wife Sally and children Phin and Clemency. Henry develops an obsessive crush on Phin which he does not reciprocate. Eventually David and Birdie have an affair, resulting in Sally and Justin moving out. As Henry Sr.'s condition worsens, David gradually gains control over the household, isolating its members from the outside world, controlling their finances, and imposing increasingly restrictive rules.

As David's influence grows, the house becomes an abusive communal environment. The children are neglected, confined, and denied a normal education, while David exploits the adults' dependence on him. After adding a codicil to Henry Sr. and Martina's will to make him the beneficiary of the house, David impregnates Martina to secure his stake in it. To prevent this, Henry uses his knowledge of herbal remedies learned from Justin to induce a stillbirth. David subsequently impregnates the fourteen year old Lucy instead, resulting in the birth of Serenity. It is later revealed that Serenity's biological father is Phin rather than David.

By 1994, the older children have begun planning an escape. During Birdie's birthday party, Henry secretly administers herbs intended to incapacitate the adults. The situation spirals out of control when Birdie wakes up and Henry kills her in self-defence and the mixture proves fatal to Martina, Henry Sr., and David. Realising the adults are dead, Henry hides Birdie's body and arranges the scene to resemble a suicide pact. He leaves baby Serenity in her cot and anonymously alerts the authorities before the surviving children scatter.

In the present-day storyline, Libby and Miller's investigation uncovers the true history of the house and the identities of those who lived there. She meets Clemency, learns the circumstances of her birth, and gradually reconnects with members of her biological family.

One year later, Libby sells the house for several million and splits the proceeds with Henry and Lucy. Libby and Miller begin a romantic relationship and he tracks down Phin, who now lives in Africa as a Safari tour guide.

== Style ==
The Family Upstairs is told from alternating perspectives and timelines, like many of Jewell's other novels.

== Reception ==
The Family Upstairs received starred reviews from Booklist and Publishers Weekly, with the latter referring to the novel as an "un-put-downable psychological thriller".

Kirkus Reviews called the novel "taut and fast-paced", with narratives that "move swiftly toward convergence in [Jewell's] signature style". Elyse Dinh-McCrillis, writing for Shelf Awareness, highlighted Jewell's ability to write multiple timelines and perspectives, stating that she "continues to solidify her reputation as a master weaver of stories".

While Kirkus argued that the novel "lacks compelling protagonists", Booklist's Betsy Vnuk found the characters to be "richly drawn", highlighting that "no one is quite whom they seem to be, and everyone is willing to do whatever is needed in order to get what they want". Publishers Weekly agreed that the characters were "distinct" and "well-developed".

Kirkus Reviews praised the audiobook's narrators, who they say "create a creepy and compelling atmosphere".
