= Lisa Jewell =

British author (born 1968)

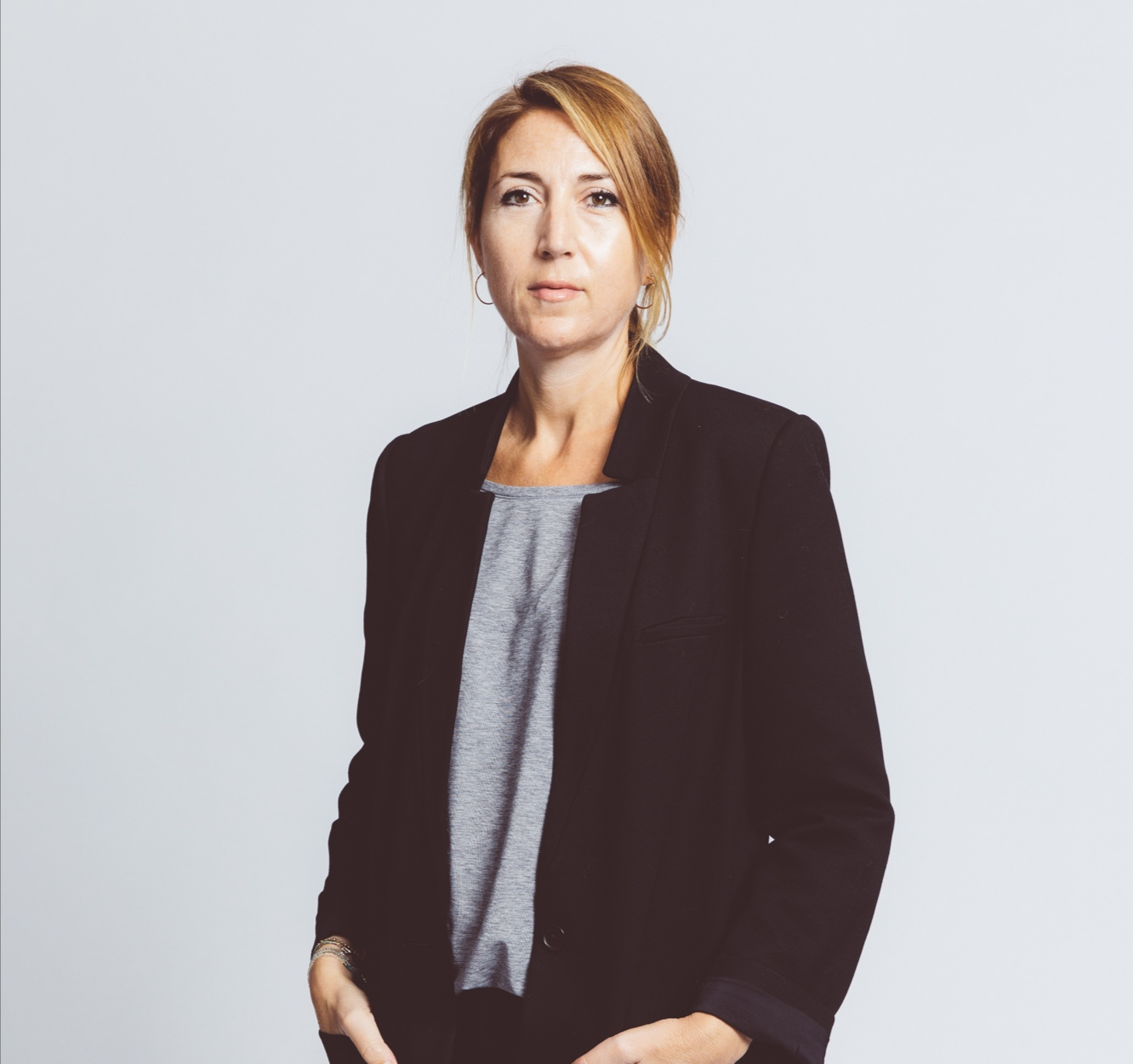
- Jewell in 2018
- Born: 19 July 1968 (age 58); London, England
- Children: 2
- Writing career
- Language: English
- Genre: Popular fiction
- Notable works: Vince and Joy (2005); Then She Was Gone (2018); Watching You (2018); The Family Upstairs (2019); Invisible Girl (2020); None of This Is True (2023); Don’t Let Him In (2025)

Lisa Jewell (born 1968) is an English author of popular fiction. Her books include Ralph's Party (1999), Thirtynothing (2000), After The Party (2010), Then She Was Gone (2018), Watching You (2018), The Family Upstairs (2019), Invisible Girl (2020), None of This Is True (2023), and Don’t Let Him In (2025).

== Early life and education ==
Lisa Jewell was born in the West End of London on 19 July 1968, to Anthony and Kay Jewell, then raised in Totteridge with her two younger sisters. She attended St Michael's Catholic Grammar School in Finchley, North London.

Jewell studied art and design at Barnet College, then attended the Epsom School of Art and Design, where she studied fashion illustration and promotion.

== Career ==
Jewell worked in fashion for several years, including at Thomas Pink. After being made redundant, Jewell took a creative writing course. After a friend promised to buy her dinner if she wrote the first three chapters of a novel, Jewell published her debut novel, Ralph's Party, in 1999. It became the UK's bestselling debut novel of the year.

In 2008, she was awarded the Melissa Nathan Award for Comedy Romance for her novel 31 Dream Street. In 2024, Jewell won the British Book Awards for Crime & Thriller and Fiction Audiobook for None of This Is True, which also won the TikTok Book Awards U.K. and Ireland for Book of the Year.

In 2022, Jewell's Invisible Girl was banned from high school libraries in the Wentzville School District after the district was sued, though the ban was later overturned.

== Adaptations ==
Two of Jewell's novels has been purchased for film production. In 2024, Netflix purchased the film rights to Jewell's 2018 novel, Then She Was Gone, as well as her 2023 novel, None of This Is True. Then She Was Gone is being adapted by British actress Catherine Steadman and produced by Crystal City Entertainment and Moonshot Films. None of This Is True is being adapted by Eleanor Burgess and produced by Something Happy Productions and Modern Magic, with Jewell serving as executive producer.

== Personal life ==
Jewell married her first husband, who Jewell claims was emotionally abusive, circa 1991; the couple divorced in 1996.

As of 2007, Jewell lived in Swiss Cottage, London, with her husband and two children.

== Publications ==
- Ralph's Party (1999)
- Thirtynothing (2000)
- One Hit Wonder (2001)
- A Friend of the Family (2004)
- Vince and Joy (2005)
- 31 Dream Street (2007) — released in the U.S. as Roommates Wanted (2008)
- The Truth About Melody Browne (2009)
- After The Party (2010)
- The Making of Us (2011)
- Before I Met You (2012)
- The House We Grew Up In (2013)
- The Third Wife (2014)
- The Girls (2015) — released in the U.S. as The Girls in the Garden (2017)
- I Found You (2016)
- Then She Was Gone (2017)
- Watching You (2018)
- The Family Upstairs (2019)
- Invisible Girl (2020)
- The Night She Disappeared (2021)
- The Family Remains (2022)
- None of This Is True (2023)
- Breaking the Dark (2024)
- Don't Let Him In (2025)
- It Could Have Been Her (2026)

== Awards and honors ==
None of This Is True (2023) and Don't Let Him In (2025) are New York Times bestsellers.

Awards for Jewell's work
| Year | Title | Award | Result | Ref. |
|---|---|---|---|---|
| 2008 | 31 Dream Street | Melissa Nathan Award for Comedy Romance | Winner | |
| 2020 | The House We Grew Up In | Audie Award for Fiction | Shortlist | |
| 2022 | The Night She Disappeared | Audie Award for Thriller or Suspense | Shortlist | |
| 2024 | None of This Is True | Audie Award for Audio Drama | Shortlist | |
| 2024 | None of This Is True | Audie Award for Thriller or Suspense | Shortlist | |
| 2024 | None of This Is True | British Book Award for Crime & Thriller | Winner | |
| 2024 | None of This Is True | British Book Award for Fiction Audiobook | Winner | |
| 2024 | None of This Is True | Theakston Old Peculier Crime Novel of the Year Award | Shortlist | |
| 2024 | None of This Is True | TikTok Book Awards U.K. and Ireland for Book of the Year | Winner | |
| 2026 | Don't Let Him In | Audie Award for Thriller or Suspense | Winner | |
