= Jessica Barry =

English boxer (born 1994)

Personal information
- Nickname: Banshee
- Born: 14 June 1994 (age 32) Warwick, Warwickshire, England
- Height: 5 ft 4 in (163 cm)
- Weight: Featherweight, Super-featherweight

Boxing career

Boxing record
- Total fights: 12
- Wins: 10
- Win by KO: 2
- Losses: 2

Jessica Barry (born 14 June 1994) is an English professional boxer. As of March 2025 she holds the English and Commonwealth Silver female featherweight titles.

== Career ==
After an amateur career with Christ the King ABC in Coventry, winning 18 of 19 fights, Barry turned professional in 2022.

On 6 June 2024, she won the vacant Midlands Area female super-featherweight title by stopping Beccy Ferguson in round six at Sports Connexion in Coventry.

Barry became English female featherweight champion on 1 December 2024, claiming the vacant title with a unanimous decision win over Chelsey Arnell at Holiday Inn, Birmingham Airport.

She faced Linzi Buczynskyj for the vacant Commonwealth Silver featherweight title at the Excelsior Sporting Club in Cannock on 6 March 2025. Barry won by unanimous decision.

Barry took on former world title challenger Reina Tellez in a non-title 10 round contest at bp pulse LIVE in Birmingham on 29 August 2026. She lost on points 94-96.

== Personal life ==
Barry has Irish heritage. She studied computer science at Coventry University, is a qualified electrician and works as a building service engineering lecturer.
