= Patrick Lee (novelist) =

American author (born 1976)

- Born: July 17, 1976 (age 50)
- Occupation: Novelist
- Website: www.patrickleefiction.com

Patrick Lee (born July 17, 1976) is an American author. He has written seven novels. His first three books comprise a trilogy centered on Travis Chase, an ex-convict who becomes involved in events surrounding highly advanced technology on Earth. His following three books feature a protagonist named Sam Dryden, a former soldier who encounters high-tech problems that border on the supernatural.

Lee's first book, The Breach, was chosen for IndieBound's Indie Next List in January 2010, and reached USA Today's bestseller list the same month.

== Bibliography ==
=== Travis Chase series ===
- The Breach (2009)
- Ghost Country (2010)
- Deep Sky (2011)

=== Sam Dryden series ===
- Runner (2014)
- Signal (2015)
- Dark Site (2019)

=== Stand-alone novels ===
- Wild Night (2022)
