= Watching You (novel) =

2018 novel by Lisa Jewell

- Author: Lisa Jewell
- Audio read by: Gabrielle Glaister
- Genre: Thriller
- Publisher: Atria Books
- Publication date: 26 December 2018
- Pages: 336
- ISBN: 978-1-5011-9007-0

Watching You is a thriller novel by British author Lisa Jewell, published in December 2018 by Atria. The audiobook is narrated by English actress Gabrielle Glaister.

== Reception ==
Watching You received starred reviews from Booklist and Library Journal. Booklist's Jane Murphy called it a "stellar domestic drama", while Kirkus Reviews referred to it as "an engrossing and haunting psychological thriller". The novel was compared to Alfred Hitchcock's Rear Window, as well as the work of Gillian Flynn, V. C. Andrews, A. J. Finn, and Ruth Ware.

Publishers Weekly stated, "Jewell does a masterly job of maintaining suspense." Elyse Dinh-McCrillis, writing for Shelf Awareness, complimented Jewell's skill at "building tension and keeping readers in the dark yet riveted until the 'Aha!' moments". Kirkus highlighted how the novel "deftly maintains its intensity and brisk pace even as the story moves through different moments in time over the previous three months".

Dinh-McCrillis noted that "Jewell excels in creating complex characters".

Considering the novel's multiple perspectives and characters, Kirkus Reviews praised how Jewell "adeptly weaves together a complex array of characters". They further noted that "Jewell’s use of third-person narration allows her to explore each family’s anxieties and sorrows, which ultimately makes this novel’s ending all the more unsettling".

Kirkus also praised narrator Glaister's "emotional authenticity and true English intonation".
