= Harmony at Home =

1930 film

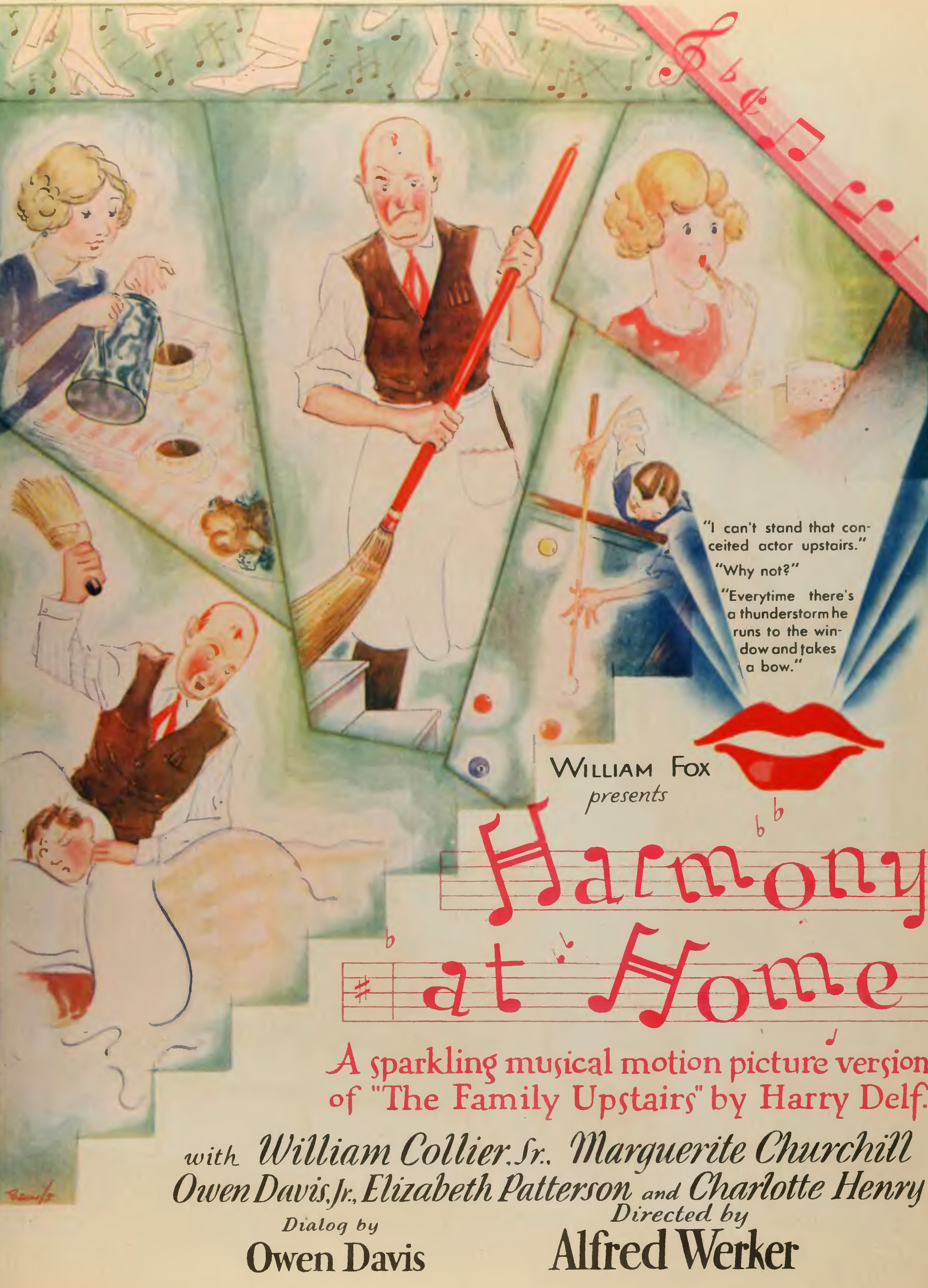
- Directed by: Hamilton MacFadden; Sam Wurtzell
- Based on: play The Family Upstairs by Harry Delf, Broadway 1925
- Produced by: William Fox
- Starring: Marguerite Churchill; Rex Bell
- Cinematography: Daniel B. Clark
- Edited by: Irene Morra
- Music by: Samuel Kaylin
- Distributed by: Fox Film Corporation
- Release date: January 12, 1930
- Running time: 69 minutes
- Country: USA
- Language: English

Harmony at Home (a.k.a. She Steps Out) is a 1930 pre-Code domestic-comedy film directed by Hamilton MacFadden. It was produced and distributed by Fox Film Corporation. It was based on a 1925 Broadway play, The Family Upstairs by actor, writer, composer Harry Delf.

== Cast ==
- Marguerite Churchill as Louise Haller
- Rex Bell as Dick Grant
- Charlotte Henry as Dora Haller
- Charles Eaton as Willie Haller
- Dixie Lee as Rita Joyce
- William Collier, Sr. as Joe Haller
- Elizabeth Patterson as Emma Haller
- Dot Farley as The Modiste

== See also ==
- The Family Upstairs (1926)
- Stop, Look and Love (1939)
