= The Family Upstairs =

Play by Harry Delf

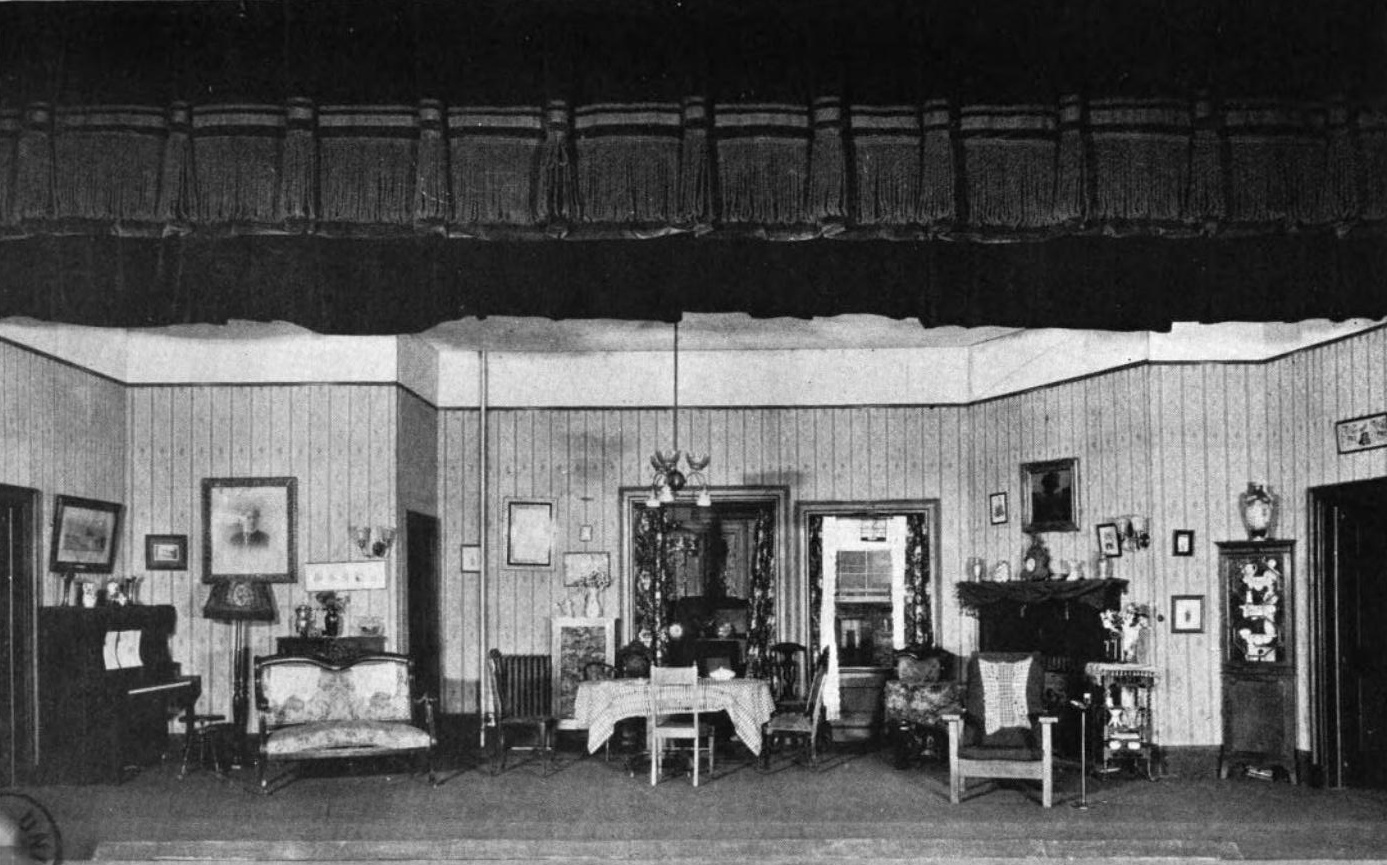
- Original language: English
- Written by: Harry Delf
- Subject: Middle-class family life in apartment
- Genre: Comedy
- Setting: Heller family parlor, Upper East Side of Manhattan

Premiere
- Date: August 17, 1925
- Place: Gaiety Theatre
- Directed by: Sam Forrest

The Family Upstairs is a play in three acts by Harry Delf. It has a medium-sized cast, one setting, and quick pacing. It is a domestic comedy, centered around the five-member apartment-dwelling Heller family, their endless bickering, and the elder daughter's suitor.

The original performance was produced by Sam H. Harris, and staged by Sam Forrest. The production, which starred Ruth Nugent, Clare Woodbury, and Walter Wilson, ran on Broadway from August through October 1925 before going on tour. It had a brief revival on Broadway during October 1933, and was adapted for motion pictures on three occasions.

== Characters ==
Listed in order of appearance within their scope.

Leads

- Emma Heller is early 40's, hard-working housewife with gallstones, who wants her daughter Louise married.
- Joe Heller is mid-40's, a streetcar inspector, annoyed with Willie's indolence and Emma's interference.
- Louise Heller is 21, a stenographer, a quiet girl who loves books and doesn't often go out.

Supporting

- Annabelle Heller is 12, a would-be flapper condemned to piano practice by her mother Emma.
- Willie Heller is 17, a school dropout with no job, outspoken, a pool shark and a bit of a sheik.
- Charles Grant is 25, a bank teller earning $40 a week, lives with and supports his mother and brother.

Featured

- Miss Callahan is a dressmaker from the ground floor who brings Louise's blouse and enlightens Charles.
- Mrs. Grant is Charles' mother, a widow with two sons and a married daughter who lives elsewhere.
- Herbert Grant is 12 and Charles' younger brother, a bit hard-boiled in attitude.

== Synopsis ==
The Hellers are a middle-class family that love one another, but often become quarrelsome due to being constrained to share a small apartment. Their eldest daughter, Louise, has taken a job just to get away from her family a few hours each day. When the play opens, the Hellers take their meals in the parlor as their dining room is being redone by painters. The parents, Emma and Joe, worry over the two older children: Emma is sure Louise will never have a boyfriend or get married, while Joe frets over Willie's lack of ambition for either school or work. Each champions the child whom the other worries about. Meanwhile, little Annabelle makes desultory classic noises on the upright piano when driven to it, but sings Red Hot Mama when freed.

At dinner, Louise startles everyone by announcing that Charles Grant is coming to call. She met him at a party a few weeks earlier and they plan to go boating on Sunday. Charles proves a personable lad, and Emma tries to make Louise seem a "catch" by inflating the family's economic status. When the couple are left alone, Charles proposes to Louise, who accepts, but wants the engagement to remain a secret from her family for now. When Charles comes to collect Louise on Sunday morning, he is made aware of the inflated expectations for modern brides through the chatter of Miss Callahan. Emma again paints a rosy picture of Louise's many (fictional) suitors and the family circumstances. When Louise appears, Charles tells her he feels his salary is inadequate to support her. Louise flies into a rage at her family, denigrating them in front of Charles. She breaks off the engagement—the first her family has heard of it—and exits, as does Charles.

A few hours later, Louise informs her parents she is leaving. Before she does, Willie notices Charles sitting on the front stoop. Joe sends Willie down with a tale to get Charles back up to the apartment. Joe also phones Mrs. Grant, who arrives with Herbert in tow. Herbert is told to go play with Annabelle, but demurs until Willie marches him out of the parlor. The three adults then open up about their aspirations for the young couple, who are reconciled, with Emma and Louise apologising to each other.

== Original production ==
=== Background ===
Harry Delf wrote the play in early 1925 while touring the West on the Gordon and Lewis vaudeville circuit. He brought it to Max Gordon and Albert Lewis, who joined with Sam H. Harris to produce it. Rehearsals began April 11, 1925, for a play which was "tenatively called The Family Upstairs".

=== Cast ===
Cast for the tryouts and during the original Broadway run. The production was on hiatus between May 10 and August 5, 1925.
Role	Actor	Dates	Notes and sources
Emma Heller	Claire Weldon	Apr 27, 1925 - May 9, 1925	Weldon was criticized for overacting by The Evening Star critic during a tryout in May 1925.
Emma Heller	Clare Woodbury	Aug 06, 1925 - Oct 16, 1925	This was the first of many Broadway roles for Woodbury.
Joe Heller	Walter Wilson	Apr 27, 1925 - Oct 16, 1925	
Louise Heller	Ruth Nugent	Apr 27, 1925 - Oct 16, 1925	
Annabelle Heller	Lillian Garrick	Apr 27, 1925 - Oct 16, 1925	
Wille Heller	Theodore Westman	Apr 27, 1925 - Oct 16, 1925	
Charles Grant	Harold Elliott	Apr 27, 1925 - Oct 16, 1925	
Miss Callahan	Hermine Shone	Apr 27, 1925 - May 9, 1925	
Miss Callahan	Norah Ryan	Aug 06, 1925 - Oct 16, 1925	
Mrs. Grant	Enid Gray	Apr 27, 1925 - Oct 16, 1925	
Herbert Grant	Jerry Devine	Apr 27, 1925 - May 9, 1925	
Herbert Grant	Sidney Salko	Aug 06, 1925 - Oct 16, 1925	

=== Tryouts ===
The play had two tryouts during April and May 1925. It first opened at Nixon's Apollo Theatre in Atlantic City on April 27, then moved to the National Theatre in Washington, D.C., on May 4, 1925. The anonymous local reviewer for The Evening Star in Washington, D.C., gave a lot of credit to director Sam Forrest for the elaborate parlor setting, under the misapprehension of what the term "staged by" means. They also faulted star Ruth Nugent for not displaying emotional intensity in her outburst scene, and cited Claire Weldon, Lillian Garrick, and Theodore Westman for "histrionics". They concluded with "Highbrows will have to broaden their mental thoroughfares thoroughly to appreciate this".

The play then went on hiatus until early August, (Note: It is uncertain whether any rewriting was done during this break.) when it was reactivated with some cast changes. Claire Weldon, (Note: Weldon had had one moderately long run on Broadway with Silence in 1924, but was otherwise known only for some regional theatre.) who had played Emma Heller in the earlier tryouts was replaced by a Broadway newcomer, Clare Woodbury, while two featured parts were also recast.

On August 6, 1925, it opened a tryout run of four days at Stamford, Connecticut. The final tryout was held at the Apollo Theatre in Atlantic City the week beginning August 10, 1925.

=== Premiere and reception ===
The Family Upstairs premiered on Broadway at the Gaiety Theatre on August 17, 1925. The Brooklyn Citizen reported the opening played "before a house composed largely of celebrities" that at times halted the play's action with their enthusiastic applause.

Most reviews of the play emphasized the entertainment value of the play's depiction of middle-class life on the Upper East Side. The reviewer for The New York Times thought the play "makes intelligent sport of a very real American characteristic-- the success idea, the 'selling' formula applied to domestic affairs". One reviewer thought the director had told his actors "to go to it with a vengeance", and another decried the overacting of all save Ruth Nugent and Harold Elliott.

=== Change of venue and closing ===
The Family Upstairs moved from the Gaiety to the Little Theatre on October 5, 1925. It is the smallest Broadway theater, and so well-suited for a production in its declining weeks. The Broadway run closed at the Little Theater on October 16, 1925.

=== Touring company ===
The production opened in Chicago at the Selwyn Theater on October 18, 1925. All the adult actors from the Broadway run went with the tour, while the characters of Annabelle and Herbert were re-cast.

== Revival ==
The Family Upstairs was revived on Broadway at the Biltmore Theatre on October 27, 1933. Leonard Doyle, who produced, staged, and appeared in it, insisted it should be considered a new play not a revival, due to revisions. Other principal roles were played by Thomas W. Ross, Helen Carew, Florence Ross, and Gilbert Morgan. The minor role of Herbert Grant wasn't listed among the cast by reviewers, perhaps having been excised. One reviewer said the play "still gives evidence of being placed in another era", while another said the character of Charles Grant (played by Leonard Doyle) had haircut and clothes from 1905. The play closed October 28, 1933, after just two evening performances and a matinee.

== Adaptions ==
=== Silent film ===
It was adapted into the 1926 silent film The Family Upstairs.

=== Sound film ===
It was later adapted for the sound films Harmony at Home (1930) and Stop, Look and Love (1939).
