= Bournemouth and Poole College =

Educational provider in Bournemouth and Pool

Coordinates: 50.725°N 1.962°W

The Bournemouth and Poole College
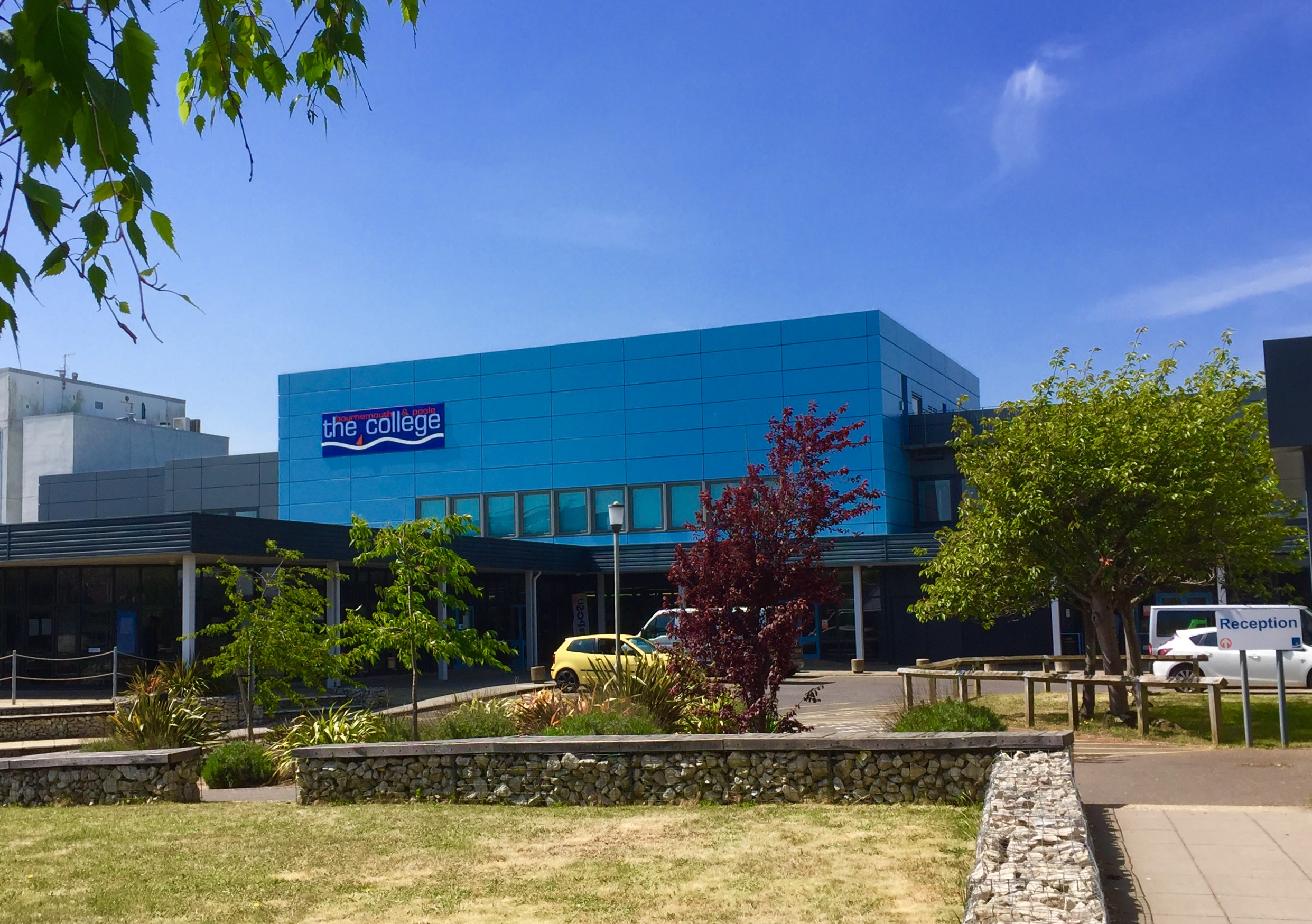
- Type: College
- Established: 1913
- Principal: Phil Sayles
- Students: 11,000
- Location: Bournemouth and Poole, England
- Campus: multiple campuses
- Website: thecollege.co.uk
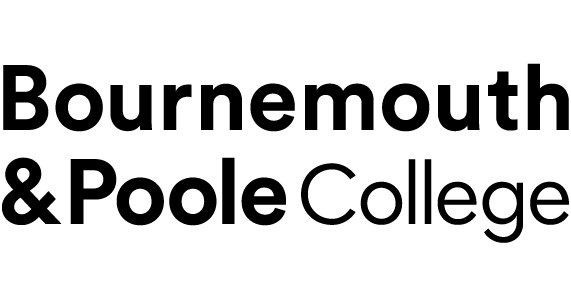

The Bournemouth and Poole College (BPC) is an educational provider which delivers further education, higher education and community based courses in Bournemouth and in Poole on the south coast of England. It serves thousands of learners each year.

== Campuses ==
The college is based at three sites in Bournemouth and Poole. It's based at Lansdowne (in Bournemouth), North Road (in Poole) and The Fulcrum (Poole).

=== Lansdowne ===
The Lansdowne campus is located on the eastern side of Bournemouth town centre on the roundabout linking Bath Road, Meyrick Road, Christchurch Road and Holdenhurst Road. The main building has a large clocktower facing the roundabout. It is close to the East Cliff and Bournemouth University's Lansdowne Campus and a short distance from both the Bournemouth Station travel Interchange and from Bournemouth University's Talbot Campus. Lansdowne is where the sixth form centre, beauty and holistic therapies, digital and computing, hairdressing, hospitality & catering, travel tourism & sport, vocational studies, workforce development, and business & professional studies are based.

The college was originally the Bournemouth Municipal College which opened in 1913. It is a listed building and is known for its clock tower (said to be an 'eyesore' when first built). A public library was part of the building until 2002. A small number of 'Horsa huts' were built in the 1940s and a large three-floor extension opened in 1957. In 1960 it took over the former Bournemouth School for Girls buildings which were two old Victorian houses (Ascham House [listed building] and Woodcote) which were used as the school when it opened in 1917. A building was built between these in 1932 which is now the catering block. The college and library were made a grade II listed building in 1973. Woodcote is now used for hairdressing and beauty therapy courses. Although modernised, no large extensions have been built to the present day.

=== North Road ===
The North Road campus is located near Poole Park and The Civic Centre.

Art and design, care education and community training (including childcare and nursing) teacher training and engineering services, and some applied computing courses are based here. North Road is also the base for pre-vocational programme courses for students with learning difficulties and disabilities.

This was Poole Technical College; the first three-storey building was built in 1957 with a small workshop block. It was not until 1967 that the major building, canteen and library were built along with more workshops. There are a number of wooden huts used for child and social care dating from the 1970s and a small number of offices in portable cabins across the centre. In 1989 the bricklaying block was built.

In the 1990s The Study Gallery was built, before being relaunched as KUBE in April 2009. This purpose-built, modern glass-fronted building was a prominent art gallery in the South West of England. The gallery was closed in 2010 due to lack of funding and the building is now being used for the college's Sunseeker programme.

In 2016 the college stopped using its Constitution Hill site and instead opened up a new multimillion-pound site, the Jellicoe Theatre building, in Danecourt Road.

The College opened its state of the art University Centre in 2024.

=== The Fulcrum ===
The college also has a site on the Fulcrum industrial estate in Tower Park, Poole for building services and construction crafts.

== Further education courses ==
The college has 24 curriculum areas and runs hundreds of courses including:

- Advances Technologies
- Beauty
- Business Administration
- Business and Accounting
- Construction Crafts
- Design & Creative Arts
- Digital and Computing
- Early Years, Education, Health & Social Care
- Engineering
- ESOL
- Financial Services
- Foundation Studies
- Hairdressing
- Hospitality and Catering
- Marine Technology
- Media
- Motor Vehicle
- Music
- Performing Arts
- Renewable Technologies
- Retail
- Social and Applied Sciences
- Sport
- Teacher Training
- Travel & Tourism
- Uniformed Services

== Apprenticeship courses ==
The college offers over 30 different apprenticeship opportunities including:

=== Accounting ===
- Accounts/Finance Assistant (Level 2)
- Assistant Accountant (Level 3)

=== Business Administration & HR ===
- Professional Support (Level 3)
- HR Support (Level 3)
- HR Consultant Partner (Level 5)

=== Care Services ===
- Early Years Practitioner (Level 2)
- NHS Healthcare Support Worker (Level 2)
- Early Years Educator (Level 3)
- NHS Senior Healthcare Support Worker (Level 3)
- Assistant Practitioner (Level 5)
- Nursing Associate (FdSc)

=== Hospitality & Catering ===
- Hospitality Team Member (Level 2)
- Production Chef (Level 2)
- Commis Chef (Level 2)
- Senior Production Chef (Level 3)
- Chef de Partie (Level 3)
- Specialised Chefs Scholarship (Level 3)

=== Construction ===
- Bricklayer (Level 2)
- Carpentry and Joinery (Level 2 & 3)
- Plumbing and Heating (Level 3)
- Electrical Installation (Level 3)
- HNC Quantity Surveying (Level 4)

=== Engineering, Marine & Motor ===
- Engineering Operative - Mechatronics (Level 2)
- Engineering Operative - Fabrication & Welding (Level 2)
- Machining Technician (Level 3)
- Automotive (Level 3)
- Marine Engineering - Engines and Propulsion (Level 3)
- Marine Engineering - Electrical (Level 3)
- Engineering Fitter (Level 3)
- Metal Fabricator (Level 3)
- Boat Building (Level 3)
- Engineering Manufacturing Technician (Level 4)
- Product Design & Development (Degree Level)
- Manufacturing Engineer - Manufacturing Management (Degree Level)
- Manufacturing Engineer - Electronic Design (Degree Level)
- Manufacturing Engineer - Marine Technologies (Degree Level)

=== Hair & Beauty ===
- Beauty Therapy (Level 2)
- Hairdressing (Level 2 & 3)

=== IT & Software ===
- Digital Marketer (Level 3)
- Digital Support Technician (Level 3)
- Information Communication Technology (Level 3)
- Data Technician (Level 3)

== Higher education, university level qualifications and degree centre ==
The higher education section of the college provides a range of degree level qualifications including:

- Foundation Degree – Arts (FdA)
- Foundation Degree – Sciences (FdA)
- Foundation Degree – Engineering (FdEng)
- Bachelor's degree (Honours) – Arts (BA)
- Bachelor's degree (Honours) – Science (BSc)
- Higher National Diploma – HND
- Higher National Certificate – HNC

All HE courses are validated by an established university and provide an identified route to a 3rd Years Honours top up where appropriate.

Full-time subjects

- Business Computing (FdSc)
- Business & Management (FdA)
- Creative Multimedia Design (FdA)
- 3D CGI:Architectural Visualisation (FdSc/BSc)
- 3D CGI:Modelling and Animation (FdSc/BSc)
- Computer Game Technology (FdSc)
- Computing with Networking (FdSc)
- Finance and Law (FdA)
- Marketing Communications (FdA)
- Music and Sound technology (FdSc)
- Performing Arts- Contemporary Theatre (FdA)
- Performing Arts- Dance (FdA)
- Performing Arts- Music Theatre (FdA)
- Professional Culinary Arts (FdA)
- Public Service (FdA)
- Radio Production (FdA)
- Tourism and Events Management (FdA)
- Tourism and Hospitality Management (FdA)
- Tourism Management (FdA)

Part-time subjects

- Post Compulsory Education(BA)
- Certificate in Education (PGCE)
- Early Years (FdA)
- Electronics and Computer Technology (HNC/FdSc)
- Engineering - Electrical Design (HNC/FdEng)
- Engineering – Manufacturing Management (HNC/FdEng)
- Engineering – Mechanical Design (HNC/FdEng)
- Engineering – Marine Technologies (HNC/FdEng)
- Architectural Technology (HNC)
- Construction Management (HNC)
- Quantity Surveying (HNC)

== Campus incidents and legal proceedings ==
=== 2016 teacher disciplinary proceedings ===
Between 2009 and 2015 Michael Browne was employed as an applied ICT programme leader. In May 2015 the college was alerted to inappropriate electronic communications sent by Browne to a 17-Year-Old student, which led to the termination of his employment in July. The following year a professional conduct hearing the National College for Teaching and Leadership issued a prohibition order indefinitely banning Browne from teaching.

=== 2023 employment tribunal ===
In 2023 an employment tribunal ruled the college had handed an unfair dismissal to a 57 year old lecturer during a redundancy exercise. The tribunal found that the college had underscored the employee and failed to offer alternative vacancy, concluding that the process constituted disability discrimination. The college stated it had implemented adjustments following the case’s ruling.

=== 2024 Meyrick Road altercation ===
In January 2024, an altercation involving a knife and a glass bottle occurred on Meyrick Road, immediately located outside the college’s Lansdowne campus in Bournemouth. The incident resulted in injuries towards five people, three of which were students, it led to the arrest and charging of two individuals. Following the incident security around the college was increased and they worked with the Dorset Police on implementing knife crime awareness initiatives on campus.
