= Tamaryn Payne =

British actress

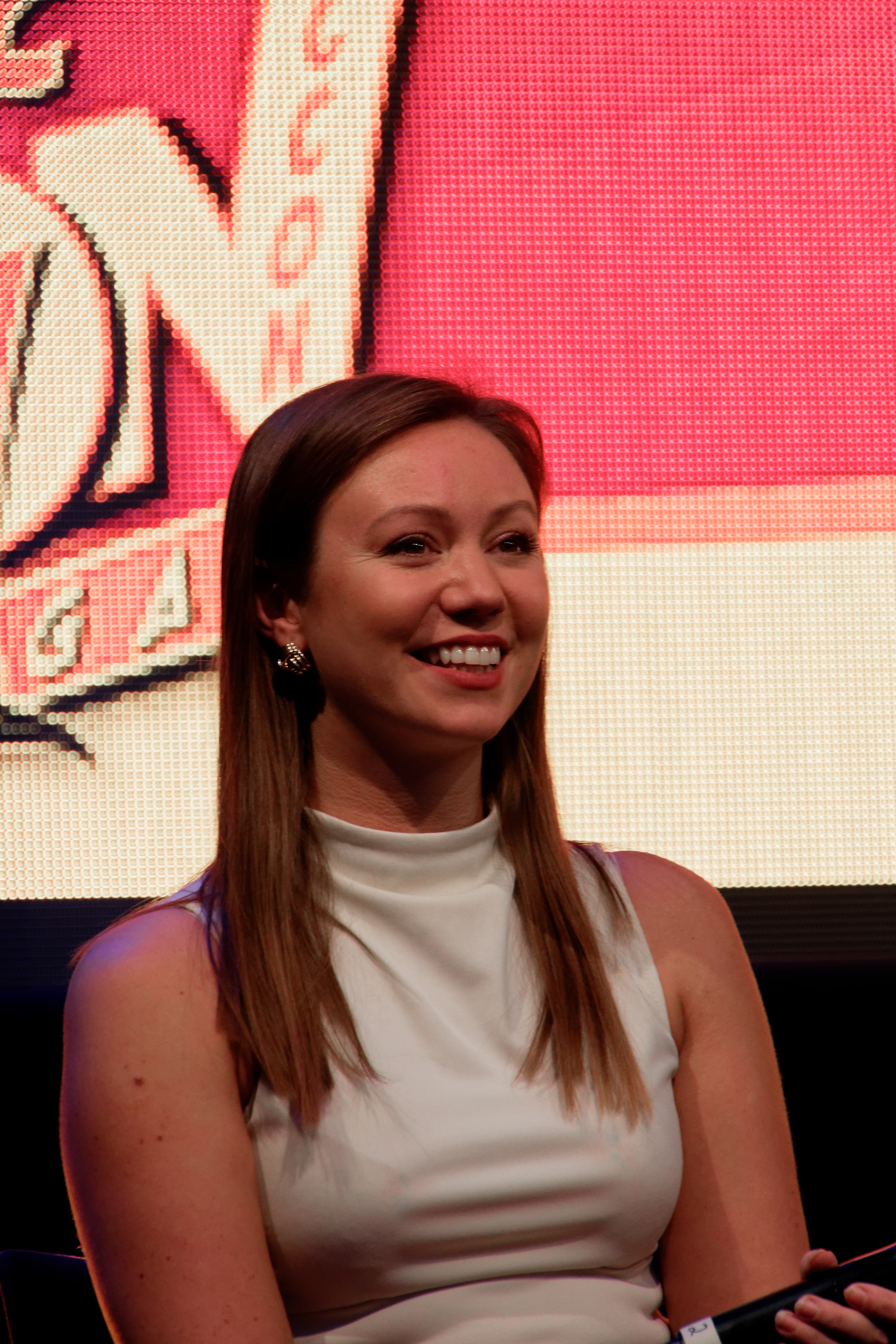
- Tamaryn Payne in 2024
- Occupation: Actress
- Years active: 2007–present

Tamaryn Payne is an English actress best known for playing Annalise Appleton in the series Hollyoaks.

== Early life ==
Payne grew up in Bournemouth, attending the grammar school Bournemouth School for Girls. She then studied for a BTEC at Bournemouth and Poole College before studying for a BA degree in acting at the Arts Educational Schools, London, graduating in 2010.

== Career ==
In 2010, Payne appeared in the short film I Luv Matt Johnson playing Zoe.

In 2011, she played Emmie in the short film Atmospheric and, on 28 September, she joined the main cast of the British soap Hollyoaks as Annalise Appleton until February 2013 when her character decided to move to London after taking a job there.

In 2012, she appeared in the thriller Stalled where she played a character who gave birth to Evie.

In 2017, she played Widow Ordlaf in series 4, episode 20, of Vikings who was consoled for the loss of her husband by Bishop Heahmund.

== Filmography ==
Films
| Year | Title | Role | Notes |
|---|---|---|---|
| 2007 | Small Town Folk | Shaz | With Chris R. Wright, Warwick Davis, Hannah Flint and Sophie Rundle |
| 2010 | I Luv Matt Johnson | Zoe | Short - with Mitchell Hunt, Charlotte Harrison and John Fricker |
| 2011 | Atmospheric | Emmie | Short - with Henry Maynard and Rob Hoey |
| 2013 | Stalled | Evie | With Mark Holden, Giles Alderson and Chris R. Wright |
| 2013 | Vendetta | Jenny Clarke | With Danny Dyer, Steven Berkoff and Josef Altin |
| 2014 | Do You Know This Girl? | Liz | Short |
| 2019 | Binge Watching | Eva | TV short |
| 2019 | One More Lie | Charlotte | |
| 2020 | Sacrilege | Kayla | With Emily Wyatt |

TV series
| Year | Title | Role | Notes |
|---|---|---|---|
| 2011–2013 | Hollyoaks | Annalise Appleton | 83 episodes |
| 2014 | Casualty | Nina Gambol | Episode: "Brothers at Arms" |
| 2017 | Vikings | Widow Ordlaf | Episode: "The Reckoning" |
| 2017 | Murder Maps | Barbara Songhurst | Episode: "The Tow Path Murders" |
| 2020 | Dupris and Durrell | Cynthia Stacy | TV mini-series – episode 13: "An Unexpected Caller" |

Video games
| Year | Title | Role | Notes |
|---|---|---|---|
| 2014 | Game of Thrones | Pit Fighter | Voice |
| 2015 | Kholat | Additional voices | English version |
| 2017 | Nine Parchments | Carabel | |
| 2017 | Divinity: Original Sin II | Lohse | Main character |
| 2018 | Q.U.B.E 2 | Amelia Cross | Main character |
| 2019 | A Year of Rain | Voice | |
| 2023 | Baldur's Gate III | Mizora | Voice and motion capture |

Appearances
| Year | Title | Role | Notes |
|---|---|---|---|
| 2011 | Rise To Remain/Nothing Left | Joven | Appeared in the music video |
| 2011 | Sex with 17 People in 60 Seconds | Hayley | Appeared in the commercial |

Theatre
| Year | Title | Role | Director | Theatre |
|---|---|---|---|---|
| 2010 | Dick Whittington | Alice | Eva Long | |
| 2010 | The Mole Who Knew it was None of his Business | Various characters | Bernie Byrnes | Kipper Tie Theatre |
| 2010 | My Dearest Byron | Belle | Bernie Byrnes | Kipper Tie Theatre |
| 2013 | Ghosts | Regina | Anna Fox | Selladoor |
| 2013 | Blood Wedding | Moon | Bronagh Lagan | Aria Entertainment |
| 2014 | 21 - Project Rumpus - Miller's Crossing | Frances Gunderson | Simon Evans | Secret Cinema |
| 2015 | Love in the Past Participle | Billie | Patrick Maubert | Friend of a Friend |
| 2015 | Welcome Home | Lady Perfumery | Laura Reeves | Infinite Experience |
| 2015 | The Heresy of Love | Nun | John Dove | Shakespeare's Globe |
| 2015 | Dark Tourism | Gemma Stone | Adam Lenson | Essee Productions |
| 2016 | Twelfth Night | Olivia | Siobhan Daly | Grassroots Shakespeare |
| 2017 | The Chainsaw Manicure | Frances | Dan Dawes | Idle Discourse |
