= The Family Upstairs (film) =

1926 film by John G. Blystone

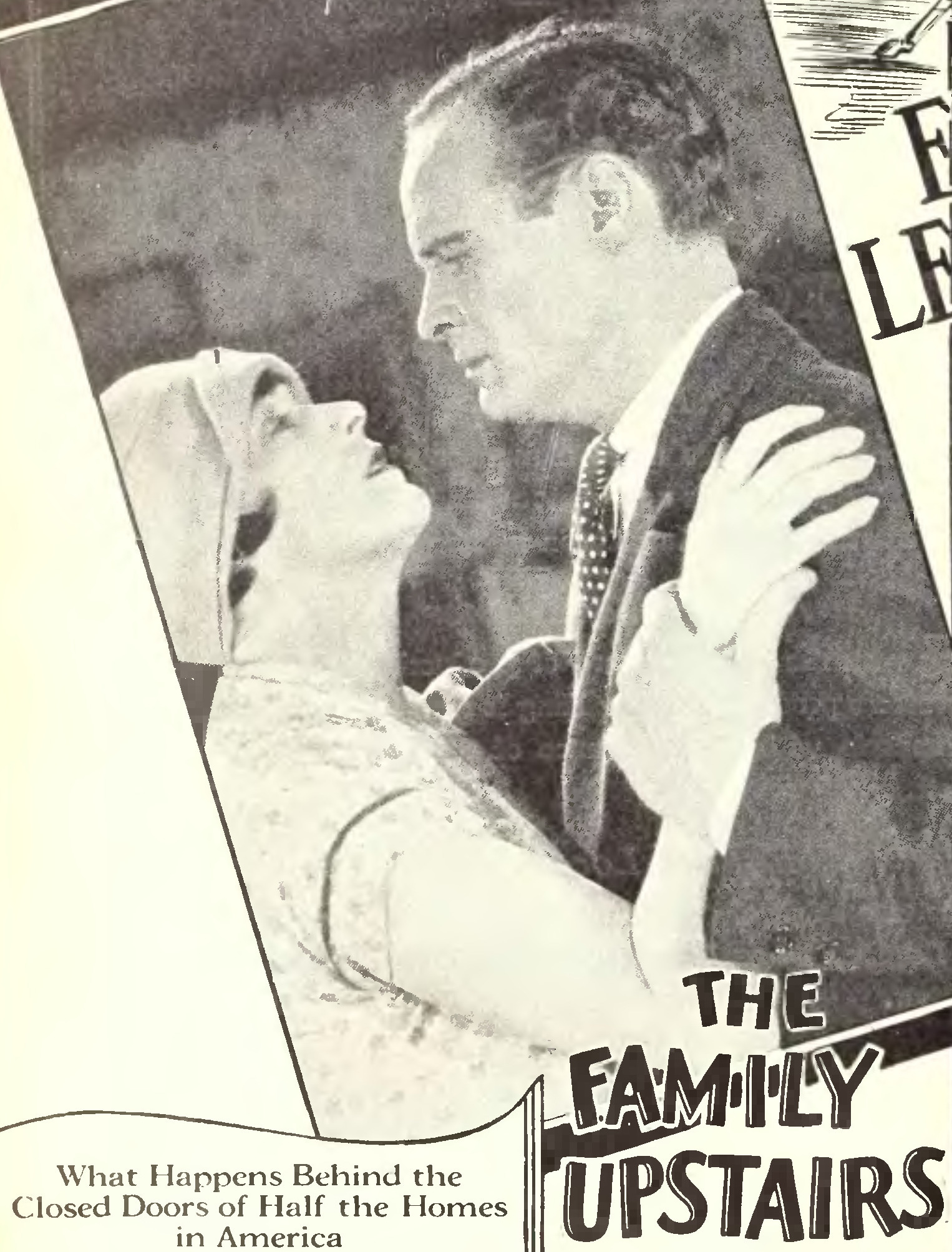
- Advertisement
- Directed by: John G. Blystone
- Written by: Gordon Rigby
- Based on: The Family Upstairs by Harry Delf
- Produced by: William Fox
- Starring: Virginia Valli; Allan Simpson; J. Farrell MacDonald
- Cinematography: Reginald Lyons
- Production company: Fox Film
- Distributed by: Fox Film
- Release date: August 29, 1926
- Running time: 6 reels
- Country: United States
- Language: Silent (English intertitles)

The Family Upstairs is a 1926 American silent comedy film directed by John G. Blystone and starring Virginia Valli, Allan Simpson, and J. Farrell MacDonald. It was based on the 1925 Broadway play of the same name by Harry Delf.

== Cast ==
- Virginia Valli as Louise Heller
- Allan Simpson as Charles Grant
- J. Farrell MacDonald as Joe Heller
- Lillian Elliott as Emma Heller
- Edward Peil Jr. as Willie Heller
- Dot Farley as Mademoiselle Clarice
- Julie Bishop as Annabelle Heller (credited as Jaqueline Wells)
- Cecille Evans

== Preservation ==
The Family Upstairs is currently presumed lost. In February of 2021, the film was cited by the National Film Preservation Board on their Lost U.S. Silent Feature Films list.

== See also ==
- Harmony at Home (1930)
- Stop, Look and Love (1939)

== Bibliography ==
- Solomon, Aubrey. The Fox Film Corporation, 1915-1935: A History and Filmography. McFarland, 2011.
