= Stop, Look and Love =

- Film poster
- Directed by: Otto Brower
- Based on: play The Family Upstairs by Harry Delf
- Starring: Jean Rogers; William Frawley; Robert Kellard
- Distributed by: 20th Century Fox
- Release date: September 22, 1939
- Running time: 58 minutes
- Country: United States
- Language: English

Stop, Look and Love is a 1939 American comedy film directed by Otto Brower and starring Jean Rogers, William Frawley, and Robert Kellard.

== See also ==
- The Family Upstairs (1926)
- Harmony at Home (1930)
