= History of Hollyoaks =

History of a UK soap opera, created 1995

Hollyoaks began airing on Channel 4 in the United Kingdom on 23 October 1995. The show targeted teenagers and initially dramatised the lives of seven teenagers living in Hollyoaks, a fictional suburb in the city of Chester in Cheshire, England.

== 1990s ==
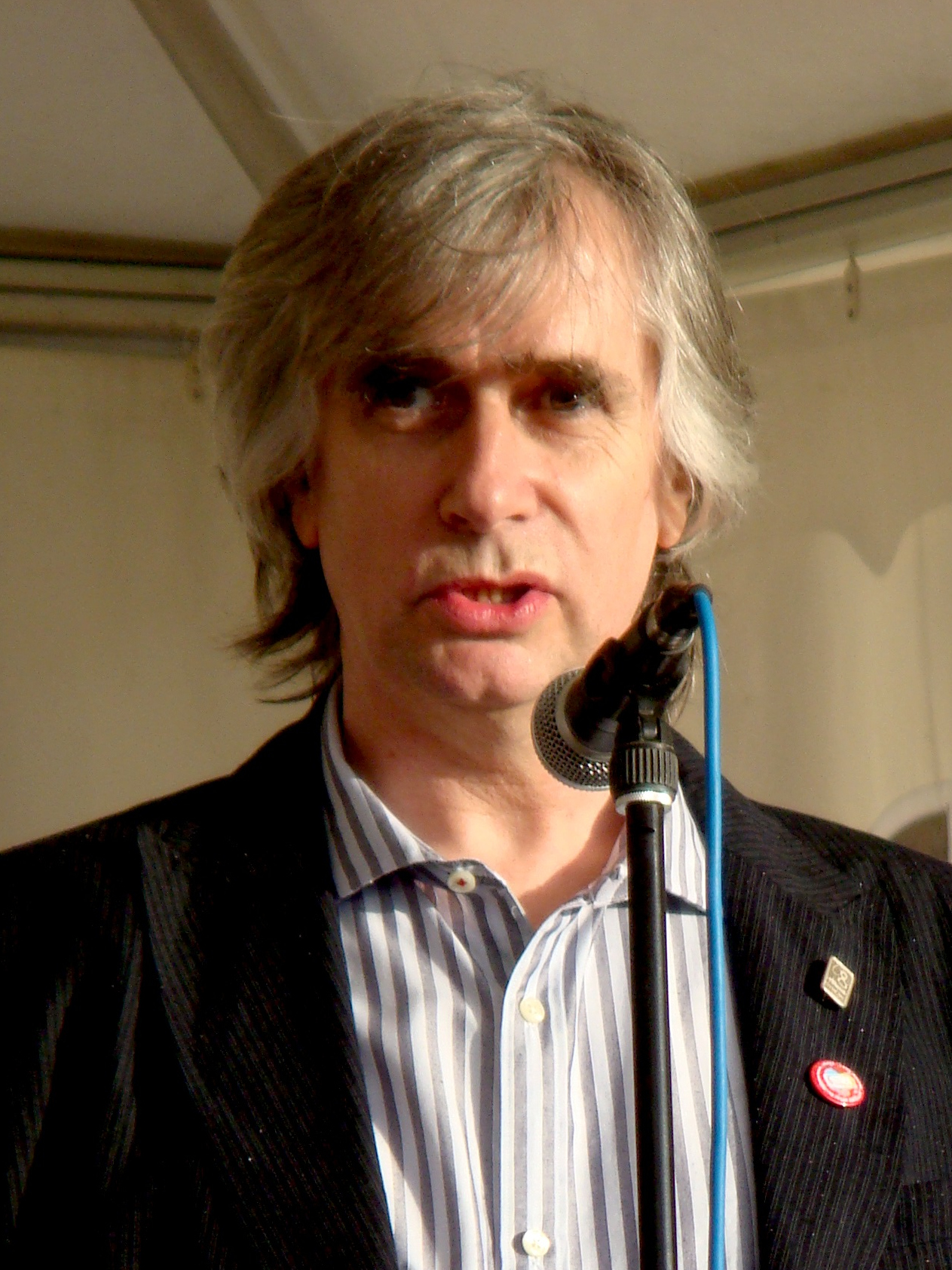
Phil Redmond (Pictured) felt there was a need for a British serial aimed at a teenage audience.

Suggestions for a serialised television drama that would explore the lives of late-teenage characters were put to producer Phil Redmond in the 1980s by viewers of his Grange Hill school-based drama series. The suggestions came from Grange Hill viewers but Redmond was unable to pursue the idea at the time due to his production commitments with another successful television drama serial, Brookside.

In the early 1990s UK television broadcaster Channel 4 sought ideas from independent production companies for a serial to be aimed at a teenage audience. At this point Redmond explored the earlier suggestions made to him, developed the theme and pitched it to the broadcaster as The Teenage Soap. He felt that there was a need for a home-grown British counterpart to the imported serials then being aired by other UK broadcasters and which targeted the teenage audience, such as Home and Away, Neighbours and Beverley Hills 90210. Channel 4 chose Redmond's plans from the pitches presented to it and within months production had begun.

The premise of the serial at its inception was to focus on seven teenagers living in the city of Chester, and in particular to deal with teenage rites of passage. The first episode aired on 23 October 1995 and achieved an audience of three million in the UK. The seven principal characters were Natasha Andersen (Shebah Ronay), Kurt Benson (Jeremy Edwards), Jambo Bolton (Will Mellor), Maddie Parker (Yasmin Bannerman), Dawn Cunningham (Lisa Williamson), Louise Taylor (Brett O'Brien) and Tony Hutchinson (Nick Pickard).

The series, which aired once per week, was initially panned by television critics and was subject to adverse press attention. However it proved popular with the teenage audience at which it was aimed. In 1996 a second weekly episode was commissioned. Redmond did have to adjust the style of the series somewhat as audience opinion was found to be that in fact the programme concentrated too much on humour and not enough on serious storylines. An early example of the change in style to issue-focussed storylines was seen when Redmond wrote out the character of Natasha, killing her off with a spiked drink.

Later in the 1990s a further two weekly episodes were commissioned to bring the total output to four episodes per week. Audiences rose to four million, before they fell to an average of around nearly 2 million per week.

== 2000s ==
By March 2000, Redmond had handed over his production responsibilities to Jo Hallows and in that year a series of open auditions were held around the country using the title On The Pull. The number of attendees was far in excess of anticipations - indeed, there were thousands - but it is claimed that all were seen and the most promising of them were called to further auditions in Liverpool. As a consequence of this process, several new cast members were engaged:

- Marcus Patric and Andrew Somerville were cast as Ben Davies and Theo Sankofa, respectively, having attended the initial auditions in London;
- Elize du Toit attended the Edinburgh auditions and was cast as Izzy Cornwell;
- The Belfast auditions produced Lesley Johnston to take the role of Laura Burns.

In 2002, Johnston left the programme to become a midwife. On 21 April 2003, Hollyoaks celebrated its 1000th episode which saw the unmasking of serial killer Toby Mills. The serial was broadcast by TVNZ in New Zealand and was such a success that in 2004 the BBC soap opera EastEnders was axed there in order to accommodate it in the schedules.

The same year saw Mikyla Dodd leave her role of Chloe Bruce after four years in order to pursue other projects. Helen Noble also left but agreed to return for four more episodes in 2005 and has claimed that the possibility of returning again remains open. A similar claim was made by Sarah Jayne Dunn who played Mandy Richardson, who left in 2006 to pursue other projects

The departure of Alex Carter and Gemma Atkinson, who played siblings Lee and Lisa Hunter in 2005 caused producer David Hanson, who had taken over from Hallows in January that year, to write out the characters' parents Les (John Graham Davies) and Sally (Katherine Dow Blyton).

At the same time Du Toit left for an acting career in Los Angeles.

Bryan Kirkwood replaced Hanson as producer on 16 January 2006. His task was to rejuvenate the series and change a perception that because the cast were good-looking they were therefore unable to act.

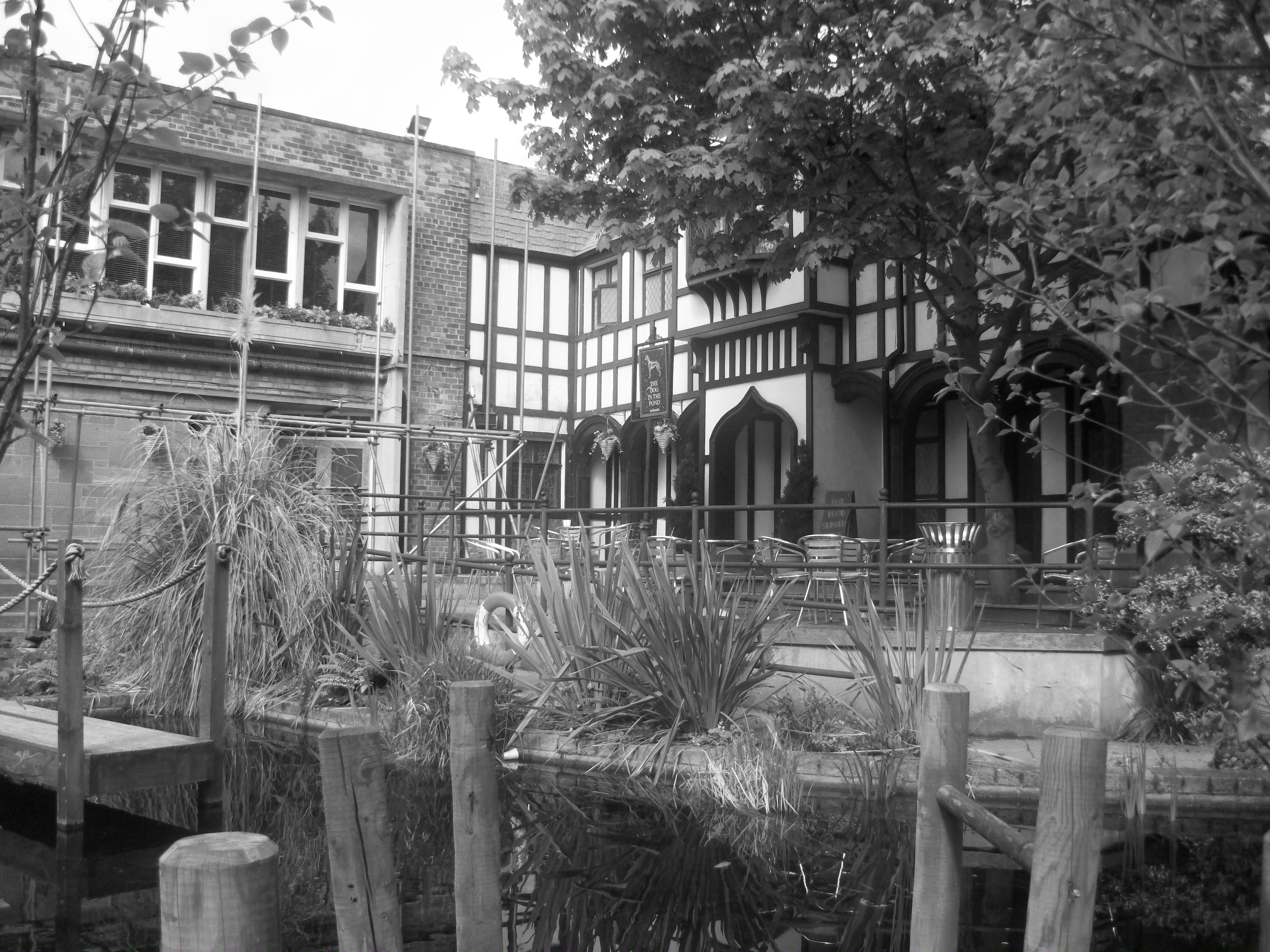
The Dog in the Pond where the explosion took place

Kirkwood introduced the new character of Mercedes McQueen, played by Jennifer Metcalfe. He also recast the role of Clare Devine from Samantha Rowley to Gemma Bissix and removed several characters including Jeremy Peterson (Simon Cole), Joe Spencer (Matt Milburn), Olivia Johnson (Rochelle Gadd), Mel Burton (Cassie Powney), Sophie Burton (Connie Powney), Sam Owen (Louis Tamone), Rob Owen (David Prosho), Carrie Owen (Jaq Croft), Nicole Owen (Ciara Janson), Bill Ashworth (John Jardine) and Foz (Benjamin Hart). Sam Owen, Olivia Johnson, Joe Spencer, Sophie Burton and Mel Burton were subsequently killed off in an explosion at The Dog in the Pond.

The issue of carbon monoxide poisoning was addressed by the programme in 2007. It emerged subsequently that the storyline had help to save the life of a viewer who was actually suffering from such poisoning at the very time of watching the broadcast. Beth Cordingly, the viewer, said that "The only respite I had in the middle of all my pain was Hollyoaks. I can't believe I owe my life to it."

2007 also saw Kirkwood sack relative newcomer Devon Anderson, who had played Sonny Valentine, because of timekeeping issues while Guy Burnet quit the role of Craig Dean after five years. Sarah Jane Buckley filmed her final scenes as Kathy Barnes in the same year and left in a storyline in which she started harassing the Ashworth family, At the same time Jessica Harris, who had played Jennifer Bidall, was also written out as she decided to concentrate on theatre roles. On the incoming side, Kirkwood introduced Hannah Tointon to play the character of Katy Fox, but she left a year later

In May 2008, the returns of Cindy Cunningham (Stephanie Waring) and Mandy Richardson were announced due to the departures of long-term characters Max Cunningham (Matt Littler) and Sam "O.B." O'Brien (Darren Jeffries). James Sutton then quit his role as John Paul McQueen. Around the same time the character's on-screen boyfriend Kieron Hobbs was written out, seeing actor Jake Hendriks last appear, however the announcement came after mass online petitions were set up try and change the producers mind on axing the character. In November the established sibling characters of Ravi (Stephen Uppal) and Leila Roy (Lena Kaur) were joined by their fictional family of Govinda (Anthony Bunsee), Bel (Nila Aalia), Anita (Saira Choudhry) and Ash (Junade Khan).

In October 2008 it was announced that Kirkwood had decided to quit and that his deputy, Lucy Allan, would take over the role, although it was not until 1 June 2009 that she was credited as executive producer on screen because of filming lead times. In the same month as Kirkwood's announcement Roxanne McKee left her role as Louise Summers after three years in the serial.

November 2008 saw Emma Rigby, who had won Best Actress at an awards ceremony in 2008, announce that she was to leave the show in order to pursue other projects. However, she then extended her contract by a further six months after Allan convinced her to stay.

Allan's first signings were Loretta Jones (Melissa Walton) and Cheryl Brady (Bronagh Waugh), both of whom had previously featured in the spin-off series Hollyoaks Later.

In April 2009, Stuart Manning quit his role of Russ Owen in order to try new projects.

In June 2009 Zoe Lister quit her role of Zoe Carpenter. and Loui Batley also left. Batley's character, Sarah Barnes, died in a skydiving accident caused by Lydia Hart (Lydia Kelly). The storyline was a first for British soap opera and the scenes went on to win the category of "Spectacular Scene of the Year" at the British Soap Awards. The scenes also earned nominations at the 2010 Inside Soap Awards in the categories of "Best Exit" and "Best Stunt".

In July 2009 three members of the recently introduced Roy family - Ash, Bel and Govinda - left the programme.

In October 2009 the series came under the media spotlight for airing scenes that involved Rae Wilson (Alice Barlow) and Barry Newton (Nico Mirallegro) attempting to commit suicide by jumping from a bridge into water below. The storyline came into the media spotlight after two young girls in Scotland jumped from the Erskine Bridge into the River Clyde, subsequently dying in their suicide pact. The serial's broadcaster decided to go ahead and air the scenes, citing that any similarities were entirely coincidental and they had carefully thought out the decision. The real-life care home in which the two girls were housed issued a statement criticising the broadcaster for airing the scenes, stating: "The decision to air this show is likely to cause further distress." Allan later revealed they were her favourite scenes of 2009.

In November 2009, the character of Loretta Jones became the centre of controversy when various media outlets revealed that Loretta would be part of a child murder storyline. The mother of murdered toddler James Bulger, Denise Fergus, condemned the storyline and when interviewed by Click Liverpool, she criticised the decision to air a plot without consulting her first. Channel 4 released a statement defending the plot, but it was abandoned soon afterwards.

In December 2009, Hollyoaks became the first British soap opera to air a 'flash forward' episode whereby the storyline looked six months into the future. The episode focused on the second wedding of Calvin Valentine (Ricky Whittle) and Carmel McQueen (Gemma Merna). It also saw Calvin's murder, starting a six-month-long whodunnit. 2009 also saw the first time in the history of Hollyoaks that it received praise from reputable broadsheet newspapers, being The Times and The Guardian who claimed the soap had become compelling viewing.

== 2010s ==
Leila Roy was written out after Kaur decided she wanted to work elsewhere from serial drama. Mike Barnes left after Tony Hirst decided he wanted to try producing plays. It was announced on 15 January 2010 that Paul Marquess would succeed Lucy Allan as the series producer. His first episode was broadcast on 5 July 2010. Marquess then announced he wanted to take the serial back to its roots and change the way its stories are told. In February 2010 he axed three characters, Josh Ashworth (Sonny Flood), Suzanne Ashworth (Suzanne Hall) and Neville Ashworth (Jim Millea) as well as replacing three of the soap's leading producers including, Henry Swindell, Caroline Roby and Rachel Hall who were replaced by Trina Fraser and Claire Fryer. In the same month it was announced that former Emmerdale actress Sheree Murphy would join the cast as Eva Strong, the biological mother of Anita Roy (Saira Choudhry). This was his first signing since becoming series producer. Stephanie Waring (who plays Cindy Hutchinson) then revealed that all remaining cast members feared their character would be axed. In March, Marquess axed further characters, including Sasha Valentine (Nathalie Emmanuel), Lauren Valentine (Dominique Jackson), Leo Valentine (Brian Bovell), Zak Ramsey (Kent Riley), Spencer Gray (Darren John Langford), Archie Carpenter (Stephen Beard), Jake Dean (Kevin Sacre), Dave Colburn (Elliot James Langridge) and Des Townsend (Kris Deedigan). Nico Mirallegro who plays Barry Newton and Gerard McCarthy who plays Kris Fisher, both quit to pursue other roles. Marquess decided to write Loretta Jones out after he felt there was nowhere left to take her as a result of her child murder plot being rewritten. It was also revealed that Marquess would introduce a new family to the soap. In the same month it was announced Marquess would reintroduce Lee Hunter (Alex Carter). It was also announced that Footballers Wives actress Phina Oruche would join the cast as the mother of the soap's new four-member mixed race family.

In April 2010, it was announced that Marquess would introduce a raft of new characters to the serial as part of its major revamp. The characters announced were, the Costello family consisting of mother Heidi (Kim Tiddy), father Carl (Paul Opacic), sons Riley (Rob Norbury) and Seth (Miles Higson) and daughter Jasmine (Victoria Atkin), the Sharpe family consisting of mother Gabby (Phina Oruche), father Phil (Andonis Anthony), son Taylor (Shaun Blackstock) and daughter Amber (Lydia Lloyd-Henry), as well as Heidi's cousin Mitzeee Minniver (Rachel Shenton). It was later announced that Marquess would introduce a new family member for established family the McQueen's.

It was announced in April that Channel 4 had commissioned a third series of Hollyoaks late night spin-off Hollyoaks Later and that the series would be headed up by Marquess. Confirmed regular characters slated to be involved were also revealed, Mercedes (Jennifer Metcalfe) and Malachy Fisher (Glen Wallace), Michaela (Hollie-Jay Bowes) and Theresa McQueen (Jorgie Porter) as well as newcomers Carl, Riley and Seth Costello and Mitzeee. In June it was announced UFC fighter Michael Bisping had been cast in Hollyoaks Later as an underworld gangster called Nathan. In the same month it was revealed that Hollie-Jay Bowes who plays Michaela McQueen had been sacked by Marquess due to her behaviour as well as being dropped from spin-off Hollyoaks Later.

In early June it was announced that Marquess would introduce Kevin Smith (Cameron Crighton) who would befriend Elliot Bevan (Garnon Davies), in a new sci-fi alien storyline. In April, Marquess announced the introduction of a third family to the soap. In June the family were unveiled as the O'Connors consisting of stepmother Diane (Alexandra Fletcher), father Rob (Gary Cargill), daughter Sinead (Stephanie Davis) and son Finn (Connor Wilkinson). In the same month Marquess revealed the introduction of a new title sequence and theme tune. Marquess also announced more new cast later in the month, including Cheryl Brady's (Bronagh Waugh) half-brother Brendan Brady (Emmett J. Scanlan), Cheryl's best friend Lynsey Nolan (Karen Hassan) who previously appeared in the first series of spin-off Hollyoaks Later and McQueen cousin Bart McQueen (Jonny Clarke). In July it was announced Marquess would introduce Seth Costello's twin Jasmine (Victoria Atkin). In the same month it was announced that he would reintroduce India Longford's (Beth Kingston) sister Texas Longford (Bianca Hendrickse-Spendlove) who previously appeared in the soap for a short stint in May 2010. It was also announced that Marquess would introduce three new students to the series, consisting of Jamil Fadel (Sikander Malik), Doug Carter (PJ Brennan) and Leanne Holiday (Jessica Forrest) who would also appear in new internet spin-off Hollyoaks: Freshers.

Carley Stenson became the longest serving female cast member, being a part of the serial for ten years, but then announced her decision to quit. Paul Marqess brought forward Allan's previous plans to tackle the issue of cervical cancer using the character of Steph to portray it. Stephen Uppal who played Ravi Roy then quit. On 9 July 2010 Ashley Slanina-Davies, Glen Wallace, John Pickard and Garnon Davies all announced their decision to leave their roles of Amy Barnes, Malachy Fisher, Dominic Reilly and Elliot Bevan retrospectively. Ricky Campbell was quietly written out of the serial for six months after Ashley Margolis decided to concentrate on his GCSEs.

In August 2010 it was announced that Sheree Murphy had decided not to renew her contract with the serial because she planned to move abroad with her family. An exit storyline was devised for Eva. Her plans later changed and she decided to stay in the UK, Marquess decided to bring Eva back after a short on-screen hiatus, of which he stated: "Sheree will be taking a little break on screen because of her family commitments, but we're already thinking about how we'll bring her back." Marquess later cast disabled actor Peter Mitchell in a new regular role.

2010 also saw the viewing figures for Hollyoaks drop below one million. This caused speculation over the serial's future but Marquess dismissed rumours that the show might be dropped by the broadcaster and stated that in fact he thought the show would become stronger. Marquess later stated that he planned on making the serial more commercial to compete to with the other UK soap operas. Marquess then signed another former The Bill actor, Scott Neal, into a regular role and repositioned Cheryl as a central character.

An interview on This Morning, an ITV television programme, in September 2010 saw actor Kieron Richardson come out as homosexual and also reveal that a new storyline was being developed in which the character he played, Ste Hay, would embark on a homosexual relationship with Brendan Brady. The same month also saw a considerable number of cast changes. Popular actress Georgina Hale guested as Blanche Longford and Rachel Doherty joined as Eileen Brady Travis Yates also joined the cast in a regular role of Arlo Davenport. Irish actor Drew Dillon also joined the cast. Charlotte Lau played by Amy Yamazaki was unexpectedly written out, after her departure the serial confirmed her final scenes had already aired. Beth Kingston was also revealed to depart as India Longford and short term regular Jem Costello was confirmed to depart after Helen Russel-Clarke finished filming at the end of her contract. On-screen Cindy also left whilst Waring was already on maternity leave.

That month another storyline was unveiled which saw Hollyoaks, team up with Channel 4 Education's Battlefront, to explore an underage sex storyline involving twelve-year-old characters Finn O'Connor and Amber Sharpe, which would lead to Amber's pregnancy. Explaining the storyline, Paul Marquess said: "Hollyoaks has long been credited for tackling difficult issues that affect young people in a sensitive and intelligent way [...] there will be no fairytale ending for Amber; she is faced with the most difficult situation she could ever imagine." In September 2010 it was announced that actor Darren Day had been cast as new character Danny Houston, described as a gangster who would "spell trouble for Jacqui".

On 23 October 2010 Hollyoaks celebrated 15 years of broadcasting, Digital Spy wished them happy birthday, as did The Guardian. It was later announced that Marquess was implementing a dramatic fire plot which would kill of a host of characters. Channel 4 promoted the storyline with a trailer broadcast during October 2010 to advertise the show's "fire week", and it was revealed that episodes would feature different characters in each episode set around the events of Guy Fawkes Night, in which an arsonist would set fire to Il Gnosh. India was killed off in a storyline highlighting the dangers of online dating. Marquess then decided to rewrite previous storyline and bring back character Warren Fox from the dead. Mandy was also reintroduced after Dunn agreed to return. Marquess was also unhappy with the quality of the episodes so began to refilm certain episodes just before they were due to transmit.

In January 2011 Marquess left his role as series producer and was succeeded by Hollyoaks production team member Gareth Philips. Discussing the news, Philips said: "I have really enjoyed working in the script team at Hollyoaks and it will be a huge honour to take the reins of Channel 4's flagship youth drama. I am very excited about taking the show even further this year with more compelling and brave stories." The new year saw the return of characters such as Suzanne, Amy, Doug and Gaz. Anna Shaffer joined the cast as Ruby Button. Anita Roy was then written out following the return of Gaz.
