= Anita Roy =

UK soap opera character, created 2008

- Hollyoaks character
- Portrayed by: Saira Choudhry
- Duration: 2008–2011
- First appearance: 10 November 2008
- Last appearance: 20 January 2011
- Created by: Bryan Kirkwood
- Spin-off appearances: Hollyoaks Later (2010)
In-universe information
- Occupation: Student/Waitress
- Mother: Eva Strong
- Adoptive father: Govinda Roy
- Adoptive mother: Bel Roy
- Brothers: Ravi Roy (adoptive); Ash Roy (adoptive)
- Sisters: Leila Roy (adoptive)

Anita Roy (also Strong) is a fictional character from the Channel 4 soap opera Hollyoaks, played by Saira Choudhry. Choudhry was cast in 2008 as part of the new Roy family and arrived in November and stayed in the serial for 2 years before she left Hollyoaks on 20 January 2011. Her more notable storylines include being racially bullied, which was nominated for an award at the Inside Soap Awards and which led to her self-harming storyline. In her time on the show she also discovered that she is adopted and began an on-line relationship. Anita also suffered an identity crisis.

== Character development ==
=== Characterisation ===
E4 described Anita as "sensitive soul". Colin Daniels of Digital Spy branded her a "troubled teen". In an interview Choudry labelled the character "disturbing" and commented that "She's not so self-absorbed and she's turned into a young adult now." On her favourite storyline she also added that it was "probably the story where Anita tried to bleach her skin." because of how challenging it was to her and because she was most proud of it. E4 also said the character was originally "a shy young teenager, who found it hard make friends because her Dad happened to be head of the school."

=== Self-harming ===
Anita's first major storyline started in late 2008, when Lauren Valentine and Barry Newton used her so they could be together in secret, this led to Anita feeling secluded from their group. Anita tried to dress like Newt and Lauren, however Leila Roy told her to be herself. She then began a friendship with Theresa McQueen. After Lauren and Newt split up, Anita and Newt began a relationship. Lauren was jealous and began to make people think Anita was bullying her. Newt took Lauren's side and dumped Anita, with only Theresa believing she was innocent. Anita began feeling self-conscious and wished to be blonde and beautiful like Theresa. She then put a picture of Theresa on a social networking website and pretended to be her, when Theresa found out, she called her a freak. Local bully Gaz Bennett approached Anita and began racially bullying her. Anita, in order to become white, began rubbing bleach onto her skin.

When Choudry found out about the storyline, she was "quite surprised". She said the nature of the story was controversial and she felt shocked at some of things Gaz does to Anita. Choudry was not certain Hollyoaks had ever aired such "dark scenes" of racism before. The storyline gave Choudry a chance to "do something new" as she had previously been filming "normal school scenes." Speaking on the opportunity to portray the storyline, she added: "I just felt really glad to be given the chance to do something like this - it was a big challenge."

== Storylines ==
=== Backstory ===
Anita was born to a teenage mother named Eva Strong. Anita was adopted by Govinda Roy and Bel Roy, who then failed to inform that Anita she was adopted until she was sixteen and told by her brother Ash Roy. She keeps to herself, and is friends with Barry Newton, Theresa McQueen and Lauren Valentine.

=== 2008-11 ===
Anita arrives with the Roy family in November 2008. They move into the Ashworths former home. Soon after her arrival, Anita befriends Lauren Valentine (Dominique Jackson) and Barry Newton (Nico Mirallegro). Anita feels she is different from her friends and begins to dress like them, however, is advised by sister Leila Roy (Lena Kaur) to be herself. After helping Bel Roy (Nila Alia) in Evissa, Anita begins to dislike Theresa McQueen (Jorgie Porter). However, the pair do eventually become friends. Anita discovers a CCTV DVD containing Warren Fox (Jamie Lomas) having sex in The Loft with Mandy Richardson (Sarah Jayne Dunn), which Ravi Roy (Stephen Uppal) accidentally left out. Anita then shows Michaela McQueen (Hollie Jay Bowes) and Theresa with Myra McQueen (Nicole Barber-Lane) and Jacqui McQueen (Claire Cooper) deciding to go to Warren's wedding to Louise Summers (Roxanne McKee) and show the wedding party. Gaz Bennett (Joel Goonan) begins to bully Anita, who makes racist comments towards her and he is later expelled from Hollyoaks High School. Lauren and Newt begin to use Anita to cover up their secret relationship with Newt pretending to be Anita's boyfriend. The pair eventually do go out after Lauren and Newt split up.

Jealous Lauren begins claiming she is being physically bullied by Anita. Anita protests her innocence, however Newt takes Lauren's word for it and ends the relationship. Theresa convinces Anita to record Lauren saying she made the bullying up and when she does Lauren threatens Anita but is told to leave by Gaz, who returns and apologises to Anita. Anita begins to think Gaz has changed and agrees to meet him. When she does, Gaz and his friends throw white paint over her and record it. With the video circulating around the village, Lauren sends it to various people, leading Anita slap her. Anita finds the video on the internet and reads hurtful comments about herself. She then signs up to a social networking website and uses an image of Theresa as herself when she gets a compliment. Anita begins to talk online to a boy named Ricky (Ashley Margolis). Theresa catches Anita pretending to be her and calls her sad. Anita is hurt and begins to pour household bleach on her legs. Leila finds Anita in pain and comforts her. Leila tells the rest of the family and Govinda believes she is ashamed of her ethnicity. Anita puts on Theresa's jacket and smashes the school window, which is caught on CCTV. Gov believes it was Theresa but Anita admits the truth. Theresa is shocked to discover Anita's self-harming and tells her she is beautiful. Theresa, Newt, Anita and Lauren confide in each other and make up, with Theresa revealing Anita's self-harming.

Anita and her "20-year-old" internet boyfriend, Ricky, decide to meet. However, Anita who has still been using Theresa's photo, is stood up, although Ricky had really caught Theresa who he assumed was Anita, kissing Newt. Anita then tells Ricky online she lied about her identity. The pair then meet and Anita is shocked to find he is actually 14. Ricky records Theresa and Newt acting more than friends in order to get Anita to believe him. During a camping trip, Newt and Theresa accidentally invite Anita and Lauren, with Ricky inviting himself. Ricky promises to keep Theresa and Newt's relationship a secret as long as they pretend to like him because he really likes Anita. When Lauren discovers the truth, Newt and Theresa have an argument and Anita is angry that they made her believe Ricky had lied. Theresa then makes fun of Ricky. Newt shouts at Anita, with Ricky standing up for her. The pair, on their own, share a kiss. Anita then decides to give their relationship a chance because he liked Anita for who she is.

Ravi's aneurysm causes him to fall into a coma after Ash hits him. Anita is worried the hereditary condition could mean she and her other siblings could get it. However, Ash reassures her she cannot and tells her that she is adopted. Anita refuses to believe Ash, who then manipulates her into keeping it a secret. To make her believe him, Ash shows her a birth certificate, revealing her birth mother was a teenager and that her parents had lied to her. She then confides in Ricky about the adoption. After finally confessing she knows about her adoption, Anita cannot face her family. Ash then tells his parents she came to him with her birth certificate, however Ravi, who awakens, reveals he overheard Ash telling Anita. To escape her problems, Anita confides in Newt and the pair begin a secret relationship. Newt, Lauren and Anita leave for a few days and go to a cottage. Gaz returns and follows the group there, as does Ricky. Gaz threatens Anita and tells her to have sex with him. Anita drugs his alcohol with peanuts due to his allergy. Anita escapes the cottage before he can force her into sex. Gaz rushes after her and jumps on top of her. Struggling, Anita reaches for a brick and hits Gaz. A Seriously injured Gaz is rushed to hospital. Newt believes he had attacked Gaz but cannot recall the events. Anita tells Newt, Lauren, Theresa and Ricky she was the one who had hit Gaz. Theresa looks at Gaz's phone and finds a recording of Anita and Newt kissing. She slaps Anita then leaves.

Whilst getting drunk in The Dog in the Pond with Dave Colburn (Elliott James Langridge), Anita is sick in the toilets and is caught by former anorexic Hannah Ashworth (Emma Rigby). Hannah then believes Anita is suffering from the same illness and consults Leila, who tells Anita she can confide in her. For attention, Anita leads Hannah to believe she is suffering from the illness. Leila, Anita's teacher Nancy Hayton (Jessica Fox) and Theresa believe she has an eating disorder. When Anita catches Hannah being sick, she feels guilty, realising she could cause a relapse and she confesses to an angry Hannah. Hannah then tells Leila, Theresa and Ravi. Anita and Ricky decide to lose their virginity to each other. However, a nervous Ricky decides to wait. Anita then lies to Leila that she has lost her virginity after she begins to treat her like an adult. She later admits she has not. Theresa and Anita set their sights on Dave. Theresa tells Anita that she can lose her virginity to him. During a party at the student halls, Anita feels like Dave does not even notice her. After he finds MDMA, Anita takes some in order to impress him. Later on, Anita goes dizzy and collapses. After being released from hospital, Ravi accuses Dave of spiking her drink. However, she later admits he is innocent and she took the drugs herself.

Anita ruins Ravi's date with a woman who she believes is called Kate, by accidentally spilling a drink on her. Later Ravi finds Anita has been stealing money from the till when asked about her recent change in behaviour. Anita reveals she's still upset with the knowledge that her real mother gave her up for adoption. Unbeknownst to her, Kate's real name is Eva Strong (Sheree Murphy) and is Anita's real mother. Anita starts to find her birth mother, with Jem Costello's (Helen Russell-Clark) help. Anita and Jem visit Anita's mother's workplace at a stall in Manchester. Anita is then hurt when she realises that Kate is actually Eva. Anita is horrified and devastated to learn this and furthermore thinking that Eva doesn't want her for the second time, and walks away in tears. However, Eva returns and begs her to give her another chance. Anita does so, but discovers that she was a result of Eva's holiday fling with her Indian father. She is deeply upset when Eva doesn't let the conversation go any further and instead, goes for fashion advice from Jem. Anita calls her mother a slapper and when Theresa comes for comfort after deciding not to have an abortion, Eva feels uncomfortable and leaves. Anita reconciles with Lauren and Lauren accepts to go to Paris with her to visit Leila but Gaz is furious about this and gives Lauren an ultimatum to either choose between him or Anita. She decides to choose Anita and consequently her and Gaz split. Anita then later finds a gun in Evissa after she is attacked by Gaz and came to Carmel Valentine (Gemma Merna) for help. She tells Theresa, not knowing that she used the gun before to kill Carmel's husband Calvin Valentine (Ricky Whittle). Theresa then tries to ignore the situation and tries to convince Anita that she must have imagined it. Anita walks off in a strop and insists that someone will believe her, but is wrong when the gun is replaced by Theresa's cousin Jacqui McQueen (Claire Cooper). Anita is later held hostage by Gaz in the woods after he successfully lures her by texting through Theresa's mobile phone. During the hostage, Gaz finds the gun in his bag and is arrested by the police who arrives at the same time he found the gun.

Anita goes to a party at the McQueen household and kisses a boy named Jason. Anita becomes smitten by Jason until she realise he is in fact Jasmine Costello (Victoria Atkins). Jasmine explains that she is Jason born into the wrong body. Despite a strange start the pair remain good friends. Anita is then involved with Jasmine's ex-boyfriend Bart McQueen (Johnny Clarke) when they begin to proceed to have sex in a room at school, until they are interrupted by Eva who catches them in the act. Anita feels embarrassed and she refuses to talk about it to her own mother. Anita stands by and sticks up for her friend Jasmine when she enters school as Jason. Eva finds Amber Sharpe's (Lydia Lloyd-Henry) diary which says that the principal Rob O'Connor (Gary Cargill) is the father of Amber's unborn child. Eva then blackmails Rob over this. At first Anita believes it, but later feels sorry for Rob and decides to give him Amber's diary so he can dispose of it, unaware that her mother had taken out the important pages. Anita brought Rob back to her house to try find the missing pages. Eva returns home and sees Rob alone in the house with Anita. She then phones the police and has Rob arrested. Gaz returns to the Village and threatens Anita. Anita and Eva decide to move to Manchester together. However, shortly before they leave, Anita decides to go and stay with Bel and Govinda leaving Eva to go to Manchester alone.

== Reception ==
In 2009 the storyline which saw Gaz racistly bully Anita was nominated for best storyline at the Inside Soap Awards. Holy Soap described her most memorable moment as "When she tried to get paler skin by putting chemical bleach on her legs."
