= Max McQueen =

Max McQueen may refer to:

- Max McQueen (Hollyoaks), a character on the soap opera Hollyoaks
- Max McQueen (footballer) (1915–1972), Australian rules footballer
