= Eva Strong =

UK soap opera character, created 2010

- Hollyoaks character
- Portrayed by: Sheree Murphy
- Duration: 2010–2011
- First appearance: 23 April 2010
- Last appearance: 20 January 2011
- Introduced by: Lucy Allan
In-universe information
- Occupation: Market trader (until 2010); Classroom assistant (2010); Personal assistant (2010–2011)
- Daughters: Anita Roy

Eva Strong is a fictional character from the British Channel 4 soap opera Hollyoaks, played by Sheree Murphy. She made her first on-screen appearance on 23 April 2010.

== Character creation and casting ==
In February 2010, former Emmerdale actress Murphy had been cast in the role of Eva, the long-lost biological mother of Anita Roy (Saira Choudhry). Of her casting, a Hollyoaks source said: "Bosses have been trying to sign her up for a while now - but she's always put her family first. But after years out of acting, she wants to give it another go. Sheree has started filming scenes and was very nervous being on set again, but she's a professional and has taken to Hollyoaks like a duck to water. She's loving it - and everyone loves having her on the team." Murphy was the first major signing of series producer Paul Marquess, who told entertainment website Digital Spy that Murphy was not cast because of her high-profile. He stated, "Casting Sheree Murphy, it was day one and they said: 'We have to cast this today'. They showed me a DVD of six perfectly good actresses, one of whom was Sheree Murphy who I recognised and said, 'Let's have her'. It's as simple as that - I've watched Emmerdale and I know what Sheree can do."

In August 2010 it was announced that Murphy had decided not to renew her contract with the serial because she planned to move abroad with her family. An exit storyline was devised for Eva. Her plans later changed and she decided to stay in the UK, Marquess decided to bring Eva back after a short on-screen hiatus, with Murphy agreeing to reprise the role. Of the situation Marquess stated: "Sheree will be taking a little break on screen because of her family commitments, but we're already thinking about how we'll bring her back."

== Storylines ==
Eva arrives in Hollyoaks village and goes to Relish diner. She meets Ravi Roy (Stephen Uppal) and introduces herself as Kate Simpson. She asks Ravi about Hollyoaks High School and he tells her that he has a sister at the school, and Eva realises that Ravi is Anita Roy's adoptive brother. Eva then gives Ravi her phone number. A few weeks later, Eva returned to have a date with Ravi where she met Anita for the first time. However, the date did not go well and Eva decided to run off, with Ravi annoyed thinking he had done something wrong. But her secret did not last when Anita decides to start to look for her birth mother, in which she learns her mother has a market stall in Manchester. Eva is worried, but eventually gets caught out when Anita spots her at her stall. Anita is devastated and Eva tries to explain the situation, but Anita was too hurt to listen to what she had to say and runs off, horrified to learn that her brother's girlfriend is actually her mother and that all that time she did not say anything about it. However, though Eva decided to see Anita again and visited her at work, but Anita is utterly furious to the fact that she never mentioned that she was her mother. After a heart to heart with Dominic Reilly (John Pickard) Anita decided to give Eva another chance. However, Eva was less interested in Anita and telling her that Anita's father was a holiday fling. Eva then meets Jem Costello (Helen Russell-Clarke) and went on a fashion advice with her instead. Anita is deeply frustrated and further upset by this until and to make matters worse, they were interrupted by Anita's best friend Theresa McQueen (Jorgie Porter), who has just avoided a termination of her baby and embraced Anita for comfort. This made Eva feel uncomfortable because to the fact that she gave her baby up for adoption and decided to leave the flat. Eva returned to the village to see Anita once again and they went shopping together after Ravi gave her some money. Anita and Eva eventually struck up a bond. However, Eva always jeopardized things, such as sleeping with Ravi. She and Ravi did this several occasions, much to the annoyance of Anita, who although disgusted at first, soon seemed to accept it. She also kissed Duncan Button, much to the humiliation of Anita; however, Eva could not figure out what she did wrong. Eva got a job as design artist at Hollyoaks High; however, she was fired when headmaster Rob, caught her and Ravi messing around in the art room during her free period. However, after finding out a secret of Rob's, that his wife had taken a baby from the hospital, she helped him cover it up, and then blackmailed him for a better job at the school. She was promoted to personal assistant. In November she catches Anita kissing Bart McQueen in a utility room in the school. She tries to talk to Anita about what she saw, but Anita is embarrassed, so she refuses to talk about it.

It was discovered that Eva stole Amber Sharpe's diary, which contained Amber making up fantasies about her and Rob, including pretending that Rob is Amber's unborn child's father. Eva revealed right before her departure that Anita is not her only child.

== Reception ==
Holy Soap refer to Eva's most memorable moment as when Anita found out that she was her mum. They also brand her as being "Free-spirited and enigmatic."
