= Leila Roy =

UK soap opera character, created 2008

- Hollyoaks character
- Portrayed by: Lena Kaur
- Duration: 2008–2010
- First appearance: 24 June 2008
- Last appearance: 8 January 2010
- Introduced by: Bryan Kirkwood
In-universe information
- Occupation: Art student Waitress
- Father: Govinda Roy
- Mother: Bel Roy
- Brothers: Ravi Roy; Ash Roy
- Sisters: Anita Roy (adoptive)

Leila Roy is a fictional character from the British Channel 4 soap opera Hollyoaks, played by Lena Kaur. The character made her first appearance in June 2008. In November 2009, it was announced that Kaur had decided to leave Hollyoaks. Lena made her last appearance as Leila in January 2010.

== Character creation ==
=== Backstory ===
Leila was born in 1989 to Govinda and Bel Roy. She is their eldest daughter and sister to Ash, Ravi and Anita. Leila, a keen artist, had told her father that she was at college studying a law course in order to retrieve his dream of her becoming a lawyer. When Leila was four, Gov and Bel adopted Anita, who Leila grew up believing to be her sister.

=== Casting ===
Regular role auditions were held for the part of Leila with actress Lena Kaur securing the role. In November 2009, it was announced that Kaur would leave the soap. Speaking of her decision, Kaur stated: "I decided to leave a while ago because I wanted to do something else. It's the same with every soap - you don't get time to rehearse, there are ups and down and it's so quick to film. You learn all the technical side of things, which is fabulous but for me, I want to move on. It seems like a good time to go as projects are being commissioned that are big for Asian actors - the casting world is moving forward. Young Asian actors are being cast in lead roles in which the characters are who they are regardless of their skin colour. Casting's definitely on a turn compared to what it was five or ten years ago."

== Development ==
=== Personality and identity ===
Leila is kind, generous and forgiving. She is a firm believer in the spirit world, karma and horoscopes and on several occasions, has used her horoscope to envision her life. In August 2008, Lena Kaur praised Hollyoaks producer Bryan Kirkwood for not stereotyping Asians on the programme. Speaking to Take 5 magazine, she stated, "The storylines for me and Stephen (Ravi) aren't being dictated by the colour of our skin. We're both British Asians in real life as well as in the show. We are both totally westernised. We've been brought up in Britain, so the storylines will reflect people like Stephen and me."

== Storylines ==
Leila arrives as a student at Hollyoaks Community College, where she moves into the halls of residence. Shortly after arriving, Leila begins to develop feelings for Justin Burton, which she tells friend Nancy Hayton. Leila accidentally knocks Justin over. He hits his head and is knocked unconscious. One of the nurses at the hospital tells Leila that Justin has lost his memory. Leila then pretends to be Justin's girlfriend when he leaves hospital. At a party, Justin's friend Ste Hay tells him that Leila is making their relationship up. Justin decides to go along with it and gets back at her by making her do housework. Justin then proposes to a shocked Leila, he then admits to knowing she is lying and reveals he has not lost his memory.

Leila has fun with Gilly Roach and they share a kiss, which makes Justin jealous. Gilly and Leila go on date, but are forced to take Archie Carpenter and Rhys Ashworth with them. Leila then turns down Gilly and starts a relationship with Justin, who finally realises feelings towards Leila. Leila begins to sleepwalk, which is discovered when she is caught on camera eating her own chocolates from an advent calendar. The novelty of Leila and Justin's relationship begins to ware off when Justin realises his true feelings for Hannah Ashworth. During Sasha Valentine and Josh Ashworth's joint birthday party, Justin kisses Hannah and is seen by Hannah's boyfriend Ash and Elliot Bevan, who has developed feelings for Leila. Leila and Elliot kiss outside and are seen by Ash. Elliot tells Leila he wants to start a relationship, as Justin does with Hannah, however Leila feels guilty and continues her relationship with Justin. Justin the splits up with Leila, who then helps him ask out Hannah. Leila and Elliot share a kiss, their love for each other and begin a relationship.

Leila begins feeling ill. When Elliot takes her for a romantic picnic, Leila, who is still ill, appears uninterested, prompting Elliot to believe she has lost interest in their relationship. After a confrontation, Leila tells Elliot she thinks she may be pregnant. Elliot runs off, worrying he would be a bad father like his own. He tries to avoid Leila, who claims to have taken a pregnancy test. Elliot returns and she reveals she is in fact pregnant. Elliot then runs out again. Leila tracks him down and tells him she never took the test and wanted to see how Elliot would react. With a strain already on their relationship, Leila takes a test and discovers she is not pregnant, to the relief of the pair. Leila contacts Elliot's father Gareth, however Kris Fisher tells her that Elliot does not want anything to do with his father. Leila then gets Elliot and Kris to take some of her art to a gallery, in order for her to tell Gareth to leave when he arrives. Gareth turns up just as Elliot prepares to leave for the gallery, however he assumes Gareth is a delivery man. Finally the truth comes out and Elliot is angry at Leila for interfering. Leila grows suspicious of Gareth, whose relationship with Elliot has grown. She discovers Elliot's half brother Maynard is in fact the same age as Elliot and not fourteen as Gareth had said. Realising Gareth is lying to Elliot and had obviously cheated on Elliot's mother Bonnie, Leila calls her. After Gareth leaves, Elliot rejects Leila.

Leila, Bel, Loretta, Kris and Anita discover Ravi is involved in an illegal fight, which could cause his aneurysm to rupture. Angry Ravi taunts Ash, who then punches him. Ravi falls into a coma and Leila blames Ash, who tries to apologise. Ash tells Anita that she is adopted and manipulates her into keeping quiet. When Anita tells Gov she knows, Leila is shocked that her family lied to her and Anita. The Roys then disown Ash. Leila tells Gilly that Ash had hidden food in Hannah Ashworth's room to make it look like her eating disorder had returned, Ash then leaves Hollyoaks. Leila ends her relationship with Elliot and has a one-night stand with Archie Carpenter, who later asks her out but she declines. When Bel and Gov move away to Middlesbrough, Leila, Ravi and Anita move into a smaller flat, previously occupied by the Cunningham family. Leila begins to worry Anita has an eating disorder after a confrontation from Hannah. However, Anita is pretending for attention. Leila overhears Anita and Theresa McQueen talking, and believes Anita has lost her virginity. Anita then pretends she has, due to Leila treating her more like an adult. When Anita collapses due to taking MDMA, Leila and Ravi believe Dave Colburn spiked her drink. However, Anita admits she took it herself to impress him.

Leila creates a sculpture as part of an exhibition. During an interview for a job with artist Jack Welsh, she is told the job is in Paris. Not knowing whether to take the opportunity, Leila confides in Elliot, and the pair grow close again, much to the dislike of his girlfriend Sheila Buxton. Anita accidentally smashes Leila's sculpture during a party, possibly ruining her chance for the job. However, Anita and Ravi Roy reconstruct her sculpture and she is then offered the job. Initially she is reluctant because of her feelings for Elliot, however he persuades her to move on, and she decides to leave. After a tearful farewell with Ravi and Anita, Leila leaves.
