= Ravi Roy =

UK soap opera character, created 2008

- Hollyoaks character
- Portrayed by: Stephen Uppal
- Duration: 2008–2010
- First appearance: 20 May 2008
- Last appearance: 23 November 2010
- Introduced by: Bryan Kirkwood
In-universe information
- Occupation: Bartender (2008–2009); Doorman (2008–2009); Restaurant owner (2009–2010)
- Father: Govinda Roy
- Mother: Bel Roy
- Brothers: Ash Roy
- Sisters: Leila Roy; Anita Roy (adoptive)

Ravi Roy is a fictional character from the British Channel 4 soap opera Hollyoaks, played by Stephen Uppal. He first appeared in an episode airing on 20 May 2008, introduced by series producer Bryan Kirkwood. Since then he has been central to a bisexuality storyline and living with an aneurysm. Uppal announced in 2010 that he had decided to leave the show.

== Character creation ==
Details of Ravi's character were announced at the same time as Leila Roy, with Stephen Uppal and Lena Kaur being cast in the roles. Ravi is described as a "cheeky jack-the-lad". Of his character, Uppal explained, "Ravi certainly makes an impression when he arrives at Hollyoaks. His cocky attitude gets him a job as doorman at The Loft and he certainly wins over resident bad-boy, Warren, with his cheek. There’s also some chemistry between Ravi and Nancy, but if Nancy likes him, she’ll have to get her skates on before man-eater Mercedes beats her too it!"

Uppal decided to leave Hollyoaks in 2010, following the beginning of Paul Marquess's new role as series producer. Uppal announced his exit on social network website Twitter. He later said: "Sorry guys, yes I decided to leave a while back. I've had a good time but always wanted to leave after a few years. Bye bye Ravi Roy!"

== Development ==
=== Bisexuality ===
Ravi's first storyline was his bisexuality. The character was first revealed as bisexual during an episode in which he tried to kiss Russ Owen. Speaking of the character's masculinity and non-stereotypical bisexual, Stephen Uppal stated, "I think they've dealt with it really well. When it's something as big as this, you sit down with the writers and the directors and you discuss everything. I thought that it was about time that a soap portrayed a bisexual or gay character who isn't overtly feminine or camp. You get them in every other soap — you see Coronation Street, EastEnders and even Hollyoaks with John Paul [McQueen] — he was quite camp in the way he was playing the part because that's how the character was meant to be played. But with Ravi, he's just this very masculine lad."

Ravi embarked on a three-way relationship with Kris Fisher and Nancy Hayton, however this was short lived. Ravi came out to his parents about his sexuality, however they were not bothered and actually assumed he was gay. Siblings Leila and Ash appeared to already know of Ravi's sexuality, with Ash saying in an episode "You still greedy then?", referring to having sexual feelings towards both males and females.

=== Aneurysm ===
Ravi's diagnosis with a cerebral aneurysm was the characters second storyline. After several dizzy spells, Kris urged Ravi to see a doctor when he did so, he was told he had an aneurysm, which could kill him at any time. Ravi struggled with the prospect of having to live without things including alcohol and sexual intercourse, which both could trigger the aneurysm to kill him. Kris and Ravi became closer once again. Uppal spoke out about the relationship stating, "They're both mature men but it really brings them closer together than when they were a couple. When they were together, though, Kris just thought "he's a gorgeous bloke, I'm having a bit of fun here". There was never anything deep and meaningful from his point of view — it was Ravi who ended up falling for Kris, surprisingly enough. But now their relationship's taken to another level because you realise that Kris does genuinely have strong feelings for Ravi as a friend and he does care about his well-being and his welfare."

Ravi, despite being fully aware of what could happen, began illegal street fights, coached by Ash, who was unaware of the aneurysm until Ravi became slightly blinded by a fight. When the rest of his family found out, they became over-protective, this sending Ravi over the edge, threatening Leila violently. Ravi began another illegal fight, however his family found out and stopped him. Angry, Ravi taunted Ash, who then punched him. Ravi went into a coma and had to undergo an emergency craniotomy, to remove the tumour, with a 60% chance of his death or being severely brain-damaged. Ravi's operation was a success, however, he was left with slight disability in his hands and leg.

== Storylines ==
=== Backstory ===
Born in 1985, Ravi is the second child of Govinda (Anthony Bunsee) and Bel Roy (Nila Aalia), he is the brother of Ash (Junade Khan) and Leila (Lena Kaur) and the adoptive brother of Anita (Saira Choudhry). When Ravi was eight, Gov and Bel adopted Anita, which he forgot as he grew up. He moved to Hollyoaks in 2008 and was followed later that year by his family.

=== 2008–10 ===
Ravi is first seen when he begins to play with Charlie Dean (Joshua McConville). Nancy Hayton (Jessica Fox) sees him and assumes he is trying to kidnap Charlie. Nancy then realises the misunderstanding. Ravi starts work at The Loft as a bouncer and briefly moves in with Warren Fox (Jamie Lomas) and Louise Summers (Roxanne McKee). Ravi is given the job of interviewing several people for a position at The Loft and interviews Nancy. Ravi takes her application as a joke and sleeps with Mercedes McQueen (Jennifer Metcalfe) after her interview. Ravi and Nancy grow closer when a smoke bomb goes off in The Loft and he saves her. Nancy gives Ravi a kiss but is offended by Warren, who says the bomb was him due to his ethnicity. Nancy and Ravi then begin a relationship. During a talk about relationships, Ravi attempts to kiss Russ Owen (Stuart Manning), revealing himself as bisexual. Russ pushes back Ravi, who tries to say he was just joking. Ravi breaks up with Nancy, however the pair do get back together. Kris Fisher (Gerard McCarthy) catches Ravi looking at him and becomes suspicious. Kris and Ravi then start a secret affair, however, unbeknown to Ravi, Nancy and Kris have also begun an affair. Nancy catches Ravi and Kris kissing, however does not do anything. They then decide to try the relationship as a three-way. Nancy struggles to cope with two relationships due to jealousy over Ravi and Kris and finishes with both of them. Kris and Ravi continue their relationship, with Kris urging Ravi to come out to his parents at Bel's Ram Navami, which he does. Kris then decides to dump Ravi, leaving him heartbroken.

Ravi helps Ash rebuild his restaurant Relish. He befriends Caleb Ramsey (Michael Ryan), who is also helping with brother Zak (Kent Riley). Ash tells Caleb that Ravi might have a thing for him. Caleb, realising what he means, runs after Ravi outside and punches him due to his sexuality. Ash notices Ravi's burst lip, but Bel assumes that it was a racially motivated attack. Ash tells Ravi to tell Bel and Gov that Caleb hit him because of his sexuality and then states that Ravi is ashamed of himself. Later, Ravi goes dizzy and collapses in the bathroom. He admits to Kris what happened after he almost faints again. Kris convinces Ravi to go to the hospital for a check-up. Ravi agrees and Kris accompanies him. Ravi runs out of the hospital after receiving devastating news, which he then reveals to Kris and tells him that he was diagnosed with a cerebral aneurysm, which could kill him at any moment. Caleb later tries to start another fight with Ravi and Kris. Ravi punches a drunken Caleb when he tries to kiss Leila.

Ravi becomes involved in illegal fighting, managed by Ash. Ravi is punched during one fight and slightly loses his sight. Leila blames Ash for his condition. Ravi eventually regains his sight. In August, Ravi and Loretta Jones (Melissa Walton) begin flirting and go to The Dog on a date. Ravi feels smothered by Leila and Nancy, who sit near them in the bar. Ravi then violently attacks Leila, telling her to stay away. Despite his family's pleas, Ravi arranges another illegal fight without anyone knowing until Kris finds out and alerted the Roys. Bel, Anita, Loretta, Kris and Ash all arrive and stop him before he is seriously injured. Ravi, angry by their inference, taunts Ash, which leads to Ash punching him. Ravi then collapsed and falls into a coma. During his time in hospital, Ravi wakes up and overhears Ash telling Anita she was adopted. When Ravi wakes up fully, he tells his family what he heard, despite Ash claiming Anita had found her birth certificate and came to him. Ash is then disowned. Ravi returns from hospital with slight brain damage and has lost the full use of his hands and one of his legs, however he reveals he will return to normal. Anita confronts Ravi, who tells her he was only eight when she was adopted and he forgot about it. Anita later forgives him. Bel and Gov decide to leave Hollyoaks after Gov applies for a new job in Middlesbrough. Ravi decides to stay in Hollyoaks, as do Leila and Anita. The three stay in the family home, however Ravi feels bad as he is the only one without a job.

Ravi reopens Ash's business Relish with the help of Dominic Reilly (John Pickard). Ravi begins dating a woman called Kate Simpson, who in secret is actually Eva Strong (Sheree Murphy), Anita's birth mother. When Anita decides to locate her mother, she discovers who Kate actually is. Anita is hurt and tells Ravi, who is heartbroken. Anita and Ravi visit Eva at her market stall in Manchester. She tries to explain her situation, but Ravi is only interested in Anita's feelings and tells Eva that Anita does not deserve to be hurt. Eva then returns to Relish to discuss the problem and they soon reconcile.

Someone sprays racist graffiti on Relish and sets off a smoke bomb whilst Ravi is still inside. It is revealed to be Des Townsend (Kris Deedigan), who Ravi, Zak, Michaela McQueen (Hollie-Jay Bowes) and Jacqui McQueen (Claire Cooper) later force to leave Hollyoaks. Following this, Ravi begins a relationship with Jem Costello (Helen Russell-Clark), but cannot control his feelings for Eva. After Jem discovers Ravi and Eva sleeping together, she moves out. Anita is not happy to find out her brother and mother were having an affair. Anita starts to worry, when Ravi disappears for two days, and it is questioned whether or not he was a fatality in the recent fire. Dom informs Anita that the police have found Ravi's body in a ditch. He is sent to hospital, as his aneurysm has returned. In order to recover, Ravi moves to Middlesbrough to be with his parents.

== Reception ==
David Knox from TV Tonight branded Ravi a "temperamental" character. Hollyoaks placed Ravi, Kris and Nancy's secret love triangle sixth on their "Top 10 Most Awkward Dating Moments in Hollyoaks History" compilation.
