= Lena Kaur =

British actress (b. 1986)

- Born: 1986 (age 39–40); Huddersfield, Yorkshire, England
- Education: Rose Bruford College
- Occupation: Actress
- Years active: 2007–present
- Known for: Hollyoaks

Lena Kaur (born 1986) is a British actress. She is best known for her role as Leila Roy in Channel 4 soap Hollyoaks (2008–2010).

== Early life ==
Lena Kaur grew up in Almondbury near Huddersfield, West Yorkshire and is of Indian descent. She attended Almondbury High School and then New College which helped her achieve her dream of being an actress. She studied acting at Rose Bruford College in Sidcup, graduating in 2007.

== Career ==
After graduating from drama school, Kaur was part of the original cast of BBC Three comedy sketch show Scallywagga, in which she played multiple characters. After successfully being cast as Leila Roy, she joined the cast of Hollyoaks in summer 2008. In August 2008, Lena Kaur praised Hollyoaks producer Bryan Kirkwood for not stereotyping Asians on the programme. Speaking to Take 5 magazine, she stated, "The storylines for me and Stephen (Ravi) aren't being dictated by the colour of our skin. We're both British Asians in real life as well as in the show. We are both totally westernised. We've been brought up in Britain, so the storylines will reflect people like Stephen and me." Kaur announced her decision to leave to pursue new challenges in late 2009, and made her last appearance as Leila in January 2010.

In 2011 she appeared as Alicia Patel in Torchwood's fourth series; Torchwood: Miracle Day airing on BBC One and US premium television network Starz.

In November 2016 she appeared in Stratford upon Avon at the Swan Theatre with the Royal Shakespeare Company in the Rover.

== Filmography ==
=== Film ===
Year	Title	Role	Notes
2015	Treasure Island	Sue	
2024	The Radleys	Karen	

=== Television ===
Year	Title	Role	Notes
2007–2008	Scallywagga	Ange / Various	
2008–2010	Hollyoaks	Leila Roy	128 episodes
2011	Torchwood: Miracle Day	Dr. Alicia Patel	1 episode
2012	Prisoners' Wives	Maya	1 episode
2012	Emmerdale	Dr Barrett	1 episode
2012, 2014	Doctors	Nadia Ahmed / Rabia Rahil	2 episodes
2013	Dani's Castle	Britney	1 episode
2014	Three Shades of Brown	Shalini	2 episodes
2014–2015	Justin's House	Mac the Explorer	11 episodes
2016	Happy Valley	Bryony	1 episode
2025	I, Jack Wright	DC Sam Carver	

== Stage ==
Year	Title	Role	Notes
2010	Sisters	Meena / Farida / Laila / Azra	Crucible Studios, Sheffield
2014	Treasure Island	Silent Sue / cover Jim	National Theatre, London
2015	The Ghost Train	Peggy Murdock	Royal Exchange, Manchester
2015	Around the World in 80 Days	Miss Singh	The Other Palace, London
2016	The Rover	Adriana	Swan Theatre, Stratford-upon-Avon
2016	The Two Noble Kinsmen	Ceres	Swan Theatre, Stratford-upon-Avon
2016	Seven Acts of Mercy	Donna	Royal Shakespeare Theatre, Stratford-upon-Avon
2017	The Earthworks / Myth	Clare / Laura	Mischief Festival
2017	The Last Testament of Lillian Bilocca	Mary Denness	Guildhall, Kingston upon Hull
2022	Betty! A Sort of Musical	Adrita	Royal Exchange, Manchester
2024	The Cat and the Canary	Surinder Ghosh	Minerva Theatre, Chichester
2024	Expendable	Yasmin	Royal Court Theatre, London
2026	Guess How Much I Love You?	Midwife	Royal Court Theatre, London
