= Jake Hendriks =

English actor (born 1981)

- Born: 1981 (age 44–45); Chessington, England, United Kingdom
- Education: Guildford School of Acting

Jake Hendriks (born 1981) is a British television actor from Chessington, England. He is known for portraying Kieron Hobbs in the Channel 4 soap opera Hollyoaks and numerous stage roles.

== Personal life ==
Jake Hendriks, born Jacob Hendrik Cuddihy in 1981 in Chessington, is the eldest of three boys, with two younger brothers, Joshua and Caleb. He attended Hinchley Wood School, and then Tiffin School, Kingston-upon-Thames, a selective boys' grammar school with specialist Performing Arts College status. He graduated from Guildford School of Acting in 2004. He is currently managed by Burnett Crowther associates Ltd and also works freelance as a professional story board artist

== Television roles ==
=== Hollyoaks ===
He played the part of gay Catholic priest Kieron Hobbs from 8 January until 5 September 2008.

In an interview with Hollyoaks website, he commented on his on-screen persona:

"He's a laid back guy and as a result he has a calming effect on the McQueens who usually have a manic household. He also seems to be always eating for some reason, nearly every scene I've filmed I've had to be eating something!”.

=== Previous television roles ===
Prior to Hollyoaks, Hendriks also had roles in Ultimate Force (Series 3, Episode 3: "Class of 1980") playing Paul Brown; in 3 episodes of Down to Earth ("Broken dreams", "Changes", "Dangerous Liaisons") playing Simon Cole and in Casualty (Series 21, Episode 26: "The Killing Floor") playing Bobby Anstiss.

== Award nominations ==
=== Inside Soap Awards 2008 ===
Hendriks was nominated for "Best Newcomer" at the 2008 Inside Soap Awards for his role as Kieron Hobbs in Hollyoaks. He had been short-listed but did not win.

== Filmography ==
- The Battle of Monte Camino (2003) – Short movie directed by Simeon Lumgair, playing Pvt. Daniel Shorter, based on Alex Bowlby's book, Countdown to Cassino (1994).

== Theatre ==
- 1999 – Macbeth – Rapid Classics – Directed by Steve Thompson; Produced by Ambroise Muchembled – Playing Macbeth.
- 2003 – Adam Bede – Guildford School of Acting – Directed by Andrew Hall – Playing Adam Bede.
- 2004 – Someone Who'll Watch Over Me – "Gateway Theatre" Edinburgh – Directed by Bruce Guthrie & Ashley Herman – Playing Adam.
- 2005 – Someone Who'll Watch Over Me – "The Venue" Leicester Square Palace – Directed by Bruce Guthrie & Ashley Herman – Playing Adam.
- 2006 – The Long and the Short and the Tall – "Pleasance Theatre", Islington – 19 September – 7 October 2006 – Directed by Bruce Guthrie – Playing Sgt. Mitchem.
- 2008 – Jack and the Beanstalk – "Hazlitt Theatre" Maidstone – 29 November 2008 – 4 January 2009. Directed by Tom Swift – Playing Jack.
- 2009 – Jack and the Beanstalk – Whitley Bay Playhouse – 18 December 2009 – 3 January 2010. Playing Jack.
- 2011 – The Comedy of Errors – Antipholus (summer season, various open-air venues)
