= Max McQueen (footballer) =

Australian rules footballer, born 1915

Personal information
- Full name: James Maxwell McQueen
- Born: 16 January 1915; Rochester, Victoria
- Died: 22 February 1972 (aged 57); Hawthorn, Victoria
- Height: 179 cm (5 ft 10 in)
- Weight: 82 kg (181 lb)

Playing career^{1}
Years	Club	Games (Goals)
1937	Hawthorn	1 (0)
- ^{1} Playing statistics correct to the end of 1937.

James Maxwell McQueen (16 January 1915 – 22 February 1972) was an Australian rules footballer who played with Hawthorn in the Victorian Football League (VFL).

== Family ==
The son of Hugh McQueen (1867–1948) and Minnie Agnes McQueen (1876–1950), née Rae, James Maxwell McQueen was born at Rochester on 16 January 1915.

== Football ==
McQueen first trained with Hawthorn before the 1937 season, being identified as a follower from Kyabram who may provide support to Bert Mills and Bill Ford. He played well in practice matches and earned a place in Hawthorn's Round 1 team that defeated North Melbourne by two points, but his performance was described as "not inspiring". He was dropped to the reserves and shortly afterwards returned to Kyabram.
