= List of Hollyoaks characters introduced in 2008 =

The following is a list of characters that first appeared in the Channel 4 soap opera Hollyoaks in 2008, by order of first appearance.

== Kieron Hobbs ==
Kieron Hobbs
- Hollyoaks character
- Portrayed by: Jake Hendriks
- First appearance: 8 January 2008
- Last appearance: 5 September 2008 (Appearance); 19 September 2008 (Voice)
- Created by: Bryan Kirkwood
In-universe information
- Occupation: Priest

Father Kieron Hobbs, portrayed by Jake Hendriks, was the new priest at St. Timothy's Parish Catholic Church in January 2008. He was taken in by Myra McQueen (Nicole Barber-Lane), who offered him a room without consulting any of her family. While settling into the family, he had caught the eyes of Mercedes (Jennifer Metcalfe) and Michaela McQueen (Hollie-Jay Bowes). Committed to his religion, he looked out for John Paul McQueen (James Sutton), trying to advise him against a relationship. During an argument, Kieron came out to John Paul. Following this, John Paul threatened to out Kieron if he did not tell Myra the truth, but Kieron said he was happy with his life and stopped John Paul from telling. After a failed Evissa Fashion show at the SU bar, John Paul and Kieron bonded over beer, leading to a kiss. The following day, both agreed to forget about the kiss and resumed their friendship with a game of Truth or Dare, which ended in John Paul publicly purchasing beer in his underwear. However, their relationship became strained after Kieron snapped when he found out John Paul had mentioned him to Hannah Ashworth (Emma Rigby). A few days later, John Paul saw Kieron baptising Charlie Dean (Charlie Behan). John Paul realised he could not come between Kieron and his faith, and asked him to move out.

John Paul and Kieron struggle to get over each other. Kieron makes friends with Kris Fisher (Gerard McCarthy). John Paul cannot stop thinking of him during the 10 km charity run. Following a discussion afterwards, they admitted to their feelings and slept together. Unfortunately for Kieron, their night made John Paul realise he still had feelings for Craig Dean (Guy Burnet). He told Kieron and they had a fight. Kieron went to live with Niall Rafferty (Barry Sloane). Kieron confessed his love for John Paul and said he was prepared to risk all for their relationship. While showering after having sex, they were discovered by Steph Dean (Carley Stenson) and Niall and Kieron was forced to end the relationship, walking out on John Paul while Michaela hid, listening. When Michaela told Mercedes that she thought she saw Kieron cheating with Kris, Mercedes punched Kieron in the face. Kieron realised that he loved John Paul McQueen, and was willing to risk everything to be with him. Before the wedding of Steph and Max Cunningham (Matt Littler), Myra found out about John Paul and Kieron thanks to Niall. Myra then told the rest of the church at the wedding. After insulting Kieron, she was removed from the church. With approval from Steph and Max, Kieron finished the ceremony. Kieron was shattered knowing his position in the church was ruined, John Paul took this as a rejection. Kieron assured John Paul that he was his life now, and he told Father Raymond he was leaving the church. Myra, when she heard from John Paul that he and Kieron were now in an open relationship was disgusted. After Tina McQueen (Leah Hackett) was in a coma due to Niall pushing her down stairs, John Paul rushed to the hospital. Niall told Kieron that he was tearing their family apart. Upset that he had caused grief for the McQueens, Kieron left for a few weeks. After time away in Aberdeen, Kieron returned and returned to his relationship with John Paul. An annoyed Niall tried to make Kieron think John Paul had spent all his time partying.

Kieron befriends Ste Hay (Kieron Richardson) and, while everyone else turned their back on Ste, Kieron took pity and did everything he could to help him after splitting with Amy Barnes (Ashley Slanina-Davies), even risking his own life despite a phobia of heights on scaffolding when Ste threatened to commit suicide. Kieron quit his position as a priest. After realising the sacrifices Kieron had made, John Paul asked Kieron to marry him. After a moment, Kieron accepted. Myra was outraged, but soon accepted their plans. The return of Craig led Kieron and John Paul to separate. Some months earlier, Myra had told Kieron about the son she had given up at birth, and by September 2008, Kieron had tracked him down. On 5 September 2008, he confronted Niall, who then poisoned Kieron's drink. During Kieron's final moments, Niall confessed to putting Tina in a coma, drugging Michaela, and making Myra discover John Paul and Kieron's love affair. After Kieron died, Niall makes it look like suicide. When John Paul returned, he found Kieron's body. He called for an ambulance. John Paul sobbed as Kieron was taken away in a body bag. John Paul was not told about Kieron's funeral as such it coincided with Carmel McQueen's wedding to Calvin Valentine and despite getting dressed to go to the funeral after being told about it by Niall, Jacqui convinced him to walk Carmel down the aisle and respect Kieron's family's wishes and pay his respects to Kieron some other time which he did a few days later at his graveside by leaving a voicemail on his phone which he deleted straight after. John Paul did not find out it was murder until Niall attempted to kill the McQueens in October 2008.

== Pauline Hay ==
Pauline Hay
- Hollyoaks character
- Portrayed by: Jane Hogarth
- Duration: 2008–2009, 2012–2013
- First appearance: 17 January 2008
- Last appearance: 5 August 2013
- Introduced by: Bryan Kirkwood (2008, 2013); Emma Smithwick (2012)
In-universe information
- Husband: Terry Hay (until 2013)
- Sons: Ste Hay
- Daughters: Angela Hay
- Grandsons: Lucas Hay
- Granddaughters: Leah Barnes (adoptive); Hannah Hay-O'Connor

Pauline Hay played by Jane Hogarth, made her first on-screen appearance in January 2008. She was introduced as the mother of Ste Hay (Kieron Richardson). During Ste's teenage years, Pauline married Terry Hay (Conor Ryan) who beat both her and Ste. After Ste got out of a juvenile facility, he moved in with Amy Barnes (Ashley Slanina-Davies) and had nothing to do with his family until Pauline showed up for his 18th birthday. She asked him to move back so Terry would stop hitting her. Ste refused. A few months later, Pauline returned, saying Terry was gone and she was on the wagon. She found out that Ste and Amy were lying about Amy's daughter, Leah Barnes (Elà-May Demircan) having leukaemia, and she demanded the money they had received. She went to a fundraiser with Amy and got drunk. After taking money from the fundraiser, Pauline left, telling Ste he had no right to judge her. Pauline returned in April 2008, arriving at Ste's flat drunk and passing out. Ste became angry and woke her up wanting to know why she was such a bad mother. Pauline blurted out that she wished she had never had him. In February 2009, she arrived for Leah's second birthday. She found out that Ste and Amy had split up and that she was not Leah's grandmother. The next day she stole £200 from the till of Il Gnosh when Ste's back was turned.

Pauline returns to Hollyoaks in October 2012 after Ste's boyfriend Doug Carter (P. J. Brennan) calls her wanting Ste to have some of his family around for their wedding. Pauline tries to convince Ste that she has changed but quickly reveals that she has not, and calls Ste a "queer". Pauline leaves once again after Ste's ex-boyfriend Brendan Brady (Emmett J. Scanlan) pays her, causing Doug to realise her real intentions as she leaves the deli with a smug look. In 2013, Tony Hutchinson (Nick Pickard) is in hospital receiving treatment for testicular cancer. While he is there he meets Pauline, who reveals that she is suffering from terminal cancer and does not want Ste to know she is dying. Tony agrees to keep her secret but decides to tell Ste as Pauline hurts her ankle and needs someone to care for her. Ste is rattled by the news and does not know how to react. Ste later feels he should not care about Pauline dying because of the way she had treated him. Despite this, he later goes to her flat. He finds her in her bedroom appearing frail. Ste later agreed to allow Pauline to move in with him and Sinead O'Connor (Stephanie Davis) in her final months to care for her. Whilst Ste and Tony were helping pack up Pauline's belongings, Pauline was eager for a box to be binned. Ste, however, was unaware it was for the bin and brought it anyway. Back at his flat, he looked in the box and discovered it was several birthday cards from his father that Pauline had kept from him growing up.

== Roger Kiddle ==
Roger Kiddle
- Hollyoaks character
- Portrayed by: Quentin Tibble
- First appearance: 5 February 2008
- Last appearance: 30 April 2008
- Created by: Bryan Kirkwood
In-universe information
- Occupation: Physics Lecturer
- Wife: Jennifer Kiddle

Roger Kiddle is a Physics lecturer who befriended Elliot Bevan (Garnon Davies) and took an interest in Sarah Barnes (Loui Batley). Elliot let Roger sleep in his room while he was busy, and walked in on Roger and Sarah in bed, which helped drive Elliot to a nervous breakdown. When he recovered, he threatened to tell The Dean about it. Meanwhile, Sarah was disgusted by Roger's behaviour towards Elliot and was shocked when she met his wife, Jennifer. In spite of Roger's pleas for her silence, Sarah told Jennifer the truth, Jennifer poured her wine over Roger's head and walking out. Sarah began a relationship with Roger, mostly to annoy her father over the age difference. Zoe Carpenter (Zoë Lister) told Sarah that Roger had made a pass at her so Sarah ended the relationship for good.

== Eli ==
Eli
- Hollyoaks character
- Portrayed by: Marc Silcock
- Duration: 2008–2009
- First appearance: 8 April 2008
- Last appearance: 9 October 2009
- Created by: Bryan Kirkwood

Eli showed up on 8 April 2008 and surprised old friend Barry "Newt" Newton. Newt and Eli met in foster care when Newt was 8 and Eli was 12, and the pair had kept in contact ever since. Eli was AWOL from the army and Newt agreed to hide him in his room. He was mentioned before his appearance when Newt and Lauren Valentine discovered the body of Sean Kennedy. Since arriving, Eli began making Newt do pranks, however, the small pranks eventually got more serious, to the level of making a smoke-bomb and planting it in The Loft, and trashing Evissa, which began to scare Newt who did not want to go along with Eli, who made him. Nobody other than Newt interacted with Eli.

On 20 June, Lauren found videos that Newt made, of him performing actions that Eli had supposedly done. Finally, whilst Newt and Eli were chanting 'Eli's gonna get ya', Eli disappeared and it was revealed that he never existed. He was Newt's alternate identity, acting out all Newt's thoughts. Newt was then diagnosed with Schizophrenia, and Eli was an audible hallucination caused by this. While in hospital, Newt told Lauren the full story. Eli had been a real person who had been Newt's friend at the children's home. However, on 25 October 2002, Newt's 10th birthday, Eli had had enough of years of foster care and hanged himself. Newt found the body a couple of hours later and was scarred for life. Eli returned in December 2008 after Newt stopped taking his medication. He managed to stir things between Newt and Lauren, which ended up in Lauren going to hospital. Eli left when Lauren burnt his belongings, and Newt threw him out. When he opened the door, Eli was gone.

It was announced Eli would return in September 2009. Newt stopped taking his medication and a vicious attack on Gaz Bennett made him feel like no one believed him. Due to both reasons, Eli returned. Newt Made a friend called Rae, who was suicidal. Eli took an instant disliking to her, taking over Newt's body to attack her however Newt managed to take control before any real harm was done. Newt and Rae decided to commit suicide together, to free themselves, however Rae was revealed to be another persona due to Newt's schizophrenia. Ready to jump into a dockland, Newt pushed in Eli, who did not resurface.

== Ella Richardson ==
Ella Richardson
- Hollyoaks character
- Portrayed by: Uncredited (2008); Erin Palmer (2017–2024)
- Duration: 2008, 2017–2024
- First appearance: Episode 2328; 25 June 2008
- Last appearance: Episode 6288; 15 January 2024
- Introduced by: Bryan Kirkwood
In-universe information
- Father: Warren Fox
- Mother: Mandy Richardson
- Stepfather: Luke Morgan
- Half-brothers: DJ Osborne; Joel Dexter; Sebastian Blake
- Half-sisters: Grace Hutchinson; Sophie Blake; Maria-Gabriella Fox-McQueen
- Grandfathers: Dennis Richardson
- Grandmothers: Helen Cunningham; Norma Crow
- Uncles: Lewis Richardson; Tom Cunningham
- Aunts: Katy Fox
- Nephews: Noah Dexter; Joseph McQueen
- Nieces: Clara Dexter
- First cousins: Steph Cunningham-Lomax

Ella Richardson, played by Erin Palmer, is the daughter of Mandy Richardson (Sarah Jayne Dunn) and Warren Fox (Jamie Lomas) she was born off screen in 2007 when Mandy left following the death of her baby daughter Grace Hutchinson.

In June 2008, Mandy brought Ella to Hollyoaks for her step-brother Max Cunningham’s (Matt Littler) wedding to Steph Dean (Carley Stenson). Max was fatally struck by a car by a drunken Niall Rafferty (Barry Sloane) after the wedding, so Mandy and Ella stayed for the funeral. Mandy took Ella and left in December 2008 after embarking on an affair with Warren Fox (Jamie Lomas), which was discovered by his fiancée Louise Summers (Roxanne McKee). Mandy later returned to Ella’s father Mark, but left him and Ella again in 2010 after re-igniting her affair with Warren. Mandy again returned to Mark and Ella in September 2011 after her attempted reconciliation with her ex-husband Tony Hutchinson (Nick Pickard) failed to work out.

By 2017, Mandy had taken Ella as she left Mark again, reuniting with her ex-boyfriend Luke Morgan (Gary Lucy). Luke, however, was an alcoholic and Ella was taken into care by social services shortly after Mandy, Luke and Ella made a permanent return to the village. Mandy struggled without Ella and kidnapped her from her foster home, but Mandy later returned her. Ella returned to Mandy's care in January 2018.

Mandy and Luke later separated after Mandy embarked on an affair with Darren Osborne (Ashley Taylor Dawson). Mandy began a relationship with Darren and she, Darren and Ella moved into the flat. Ella befriended Charlie Dean (Charlie Behan), who Darren had become close to through his marriage with Charlie's guardian and aunt Nancy Osborne (Jessica Fox). In October 2019, Charlie and Ella snuck onto the construction site for Cunningham's Grande Bazaar and into the underground tunnels. They were trapped when the tunnels caved in, but they managed to escape.

In October 2020, Ella discovered that Charlie was dealing drugs for Jordan Price (Connor Calland), as part of Victor Brothers’ (Benjamin O’Mahony) gang. Ella was also forced to deal drugs after being blackmailed into doing so by Juliet Nightingale (Niamh Blackshaw). In December 2020, Victor attempted to force Ella to smuggle drugs inside of her body, but refused to do so. As she and Charlie attempted to hide from the dealers in The Hutch, Jordan found them under the table and Ella fatally stabbed him in Charlie's defence.

Charlie told the police that he had stabbed Jordan, with Mandy convincing Ella to go along with the lie until Nancy discovered a letter from Charlie in Ella's possession that proved that he was innocent. Charlie was subsequently released and Ella was arrested and charged. Ella returned to the village in August 2021, having been convicted of manslaughter and receiving a youth rehabilitation order.

Ella's relationship with Mandy became strained, and she moved in with Darren, Nancy and Charlie. Bonding over their experiences in prison, Charlie and Ella began a relationship which soon became sexual to Darren and Nancy’s horror. Ella later confessed to Mandy as she believed that she was pregnant, so Mandy had Ella take a pregnancy test which came back negative. On 15 January 2024 Ste Hay accidentally hit and killed a drunken Ella as he raced an unconscious Leah to the hospital. Ste didn’t realise he'd run over Ella until he found one of her distinctive red boots lodged under the wheel of his car.

In 2023, Sarah Ellis from Inside Soap wrote that there was "no wonder" why Ella was "so troubled" due to her not knowing who her father is, with Ellis commenting that Mandy had some "explaining" to do.

== Max McQueen ==
Max McQueen
- Hollyoaks character
- Portrayed by: Brayden Haynes-Mawdsley (2008−2009); Gabriel Lawrence (2018−2019)
- Duration: 2008–2009, 2018–2019
- First appearance: 2 July 2008
- Last appearance: 2 July 2019
- Introduced by: Bryan Kirkwood
In-universe information
- Other names: Max Owen
- Family: McQueen
- Father: Russ Owen
- Mother: Tina Reilly
- Stepfather: Dominic Reilly
- Grandfathers: Rob Owen
- Grandmothers: Carrie Owen; Myra McQueen
- Uncles: Niall Rafferty; John Paul McQueen; Sam Owen
- Aunts: Nicole Owen; Jacqui McQueen; Mercedes McQueen; Carmel McQueen; Michaela McQueen; Carmina McQueen
- First cousins: Bobby Costello; Gabriel McQueen; Matthew McQueen
- Other relatives: Marlena McQueen; Breda McQueen; Goldie McQueen; Sylver McQueen; Reenie McQueen; Porsche McQueen; Celine McQueen; Cleo McQueen; Prince McQueen; Hunter McQueen; Cher Winters

Max McQueen (also Owen), is the son of Tina Reilly (Leah Hackett) and Russ Owen (Stuart Manning). Max appears between 2 July 2008 and 3 June 2009, portrayed by child actor Brayden Haynes-Mawdsley. It was announced on 20 July 2018 that Max would return to the series following Russ' return. Max is ten years old upon his reintroduction. Upon his reintroduction, Max is portrayed by Gabriel Lawrence. Jennifer Metcalfe, who portrays Mercedes McQueen, said that working with Lawrence was enjoyable and that he brought "a really lovely energy".

In 2007, Tina agrees to be a surrogate for her sister Jacqui McQueen (Claire Cooper) and her partner, Tony Hutchinson (Nick Pickard). At her 12-week scan, Tina discovers that she is 15 weeks pregnant, meaning that Russ is the child's father. Tina tells Jacqui, who convinces Tina to stay quiet. Tina's brother, Niall Rafferty (Barry Sloane), pushes her down the stairs, causing her to give birth in a caesarean section. After learning she cannot have any more children, Tina decides to raise Max as she could not bare to give him away, creating strain between Tina and Jacqui. As Russ prepares to leave the village, Tina reveals that he is Max's father and convinces him to stay to be Max's father. A month later, Niall kills Tina in an explosion leaving Max without a mum, so Jacqui begins raising Max, promising Russ access. She later restricts Russ access to his son, so he plans to run away with Max. As Tina's sister, Carmel McQueen (Gemma Merna) babysits Max, Russ visits him and kidnaps him. Carmel sees this, but lets them go. Max leaves the village with Russ and Justin Burton (Chris Fountain). Jacqui is devastated when she discovers that Max and his passport are missing.

Nine years later, Mercedes arranges a hen party in Magaluf, where her family are given the opportunity to meet her new fiancé. They are shocked to realise it is Russ, but Myra is delighted when he introduces her to Max. Russ and Max then move to the village with Mercedes and her son, Bobby Costello (Jayden Fox) and she brings him up as her own son.

After Max wanting to live with his aunt Nicole Owen (Ciara Janson) in Greece after Russ is murdered and Mercedes starts drinking heavily and taking out her grief on Max. He later returns in July 2019 back to the village with Nicole for his birthday party to see Mercedes and the rest of the McQueen family.

== Caroline Cooper ==
Caroline Cooper
- Hollyoaks character
- Portrayed by: Kari Corbett
- Duration: 2008
- First appearance: 7 July 2008
- Last appearance: 26 September 2008
- Created by: Bryan Kirkwood

Caroline Cooper first appeared on 7 July 2008 as Russ Owen's (Stuart Manning) girlfriend. Caroline told Russ that she worked for MI6 and had to be careful in public. Russ spotted Caroline in a postwoman outfit and realised that she lied. She told Russ that she did not want him to know in case he thought that she was boring. She apologised and they continued their relationship. On 26 September 2008, Russ and Caroline decided to travel the world. Russ then stayed to be with his son, Max McQueen (Brayden Haynes-Mawdsley). Caroline left on her own. She sent Russ a postcard later in the year.

== Eamon Fisher ==
Eamon Fisher
- Hollyoaks character
- Portrayed by: Derek Halligan
- Duration: 2008
- First appearance: 14 July 2008
- Last appearance: 17 July 2008
- Created by: Bryan Kirkwood
In-universe information
- Wife: Erin Fisher
- Sons: Kris Fisher; Malachy Fisher
- Daughters: Bernadette Fisher

Eamon Fisher was the father of Kris (Gerard McCarthy) and Malachy Fisher (Glen Wallace). On arrival, his refusal to accept Kris' sexuality lead to an argument. Despite attempts by Elliot Bevan (Garnon Davies) to get the pair to reconcile, Eamon decided to leave, unable to come to terms with his son's sexuality. However, before he left, he collapsed in the car park of The Dog and died of alcohol poisoning. Upon finding the body, Darren Osborne (Ashley Taylor Dawson) disposed of Eamon's wallet, and passed the body off as his father Jack Osborne (Jimmy McKenna), in order to claim life insurance and solve his family's financial issues. After hearing of Jack's "death", and unaware of his father's demise, Kris contacted Eamon in hopes of reconciling. When Jack's faked death came out in October, Eamon's body was sent home where he was cremated in Hollyoaks Later. That night, Kris and Malachy took his urn to the pub and forgot to take it back. The following day, just after Kris came out as a bisexual cross-dresser, the brothers got into a fight with a few of others which only ended when Erin walked in to see Malachy smash Eamon's urn over one man's head, scattering them everywhere.

== Jean Snow ==
Jean Snow
- Hollyoaks character
- Portrayed by: Sue McCormack
- Duration: 2008
- First appearance: 4 September 2008
- Last appearance: 13 September 2008
- Created by: Bryan Kirkwood
In-universe information
- Husband: Mr Rafferty
- Adoptive sons: Niall Rafferty

Jean Snow is the adoptive mother of Niall Rafferty (Barry Sloane) who first appeared on 4 September 2008. She appeared when Kieron Hobbs (Jake Hendriks) was asked by Myra McQueen (Nicole Barber-Lane) if he could help locate the son she gave up at birth. Jean showed Kieron a photograph of Niall with his "girlfriend", Steph Cunningham (Carley Stenson). Jean later arrived in Hollyoaks village, when Niall discovered Kieron knew his secret.

== Mark Gascoyne ==
Mark Gascoyne
- Hollyoaks character
- Portrayed by: Craig Russell
- Duration: 2008–2009
- First appearance: 29 October 2008
- Last appearance: 8 June 2009
- Created by: Bryan Kirkwood
In-universe information
- Occupation: Detective Inspector

DI Mark Gascoyne is a colleague of Calvin Valentine (Ricky Whittle). He is portrayed by Craig Russell. Mark is a DI who works alongside Calvin. He slept with Jacqui McQueen (Claire Cooper) during a breakdown of her relationship with Tony Hutchinson (Nick Pickard). He became closer to Jacqui's half-sister, Carmel McQueen (Gemma Merna). Calvin found condoms in Carmel's purse. He became suspicious of Mark and Carmel's relationship. Carmel confessed that she bought them for Lauren Valentine (Dominique Jackson) and Barry "Newt" Newton (Nico Mirallegro). Mark raided The Loft and made Calvin beat up Warren Fox (Jamie Lomas). Mark upset Louise Summers (Roxanne McKee) and Ravi Roy (Stephen Uppal) by insinuating that Warren was dead. Warren then beat up Mark as revenge. In December 2008, Mark and Calvin arrested Tony for sleeping with 15-year-old Theresa McQueen (Jorgie Porter). In May 2009, he became aware of Calvin's deals with Warren. Calvin told him everything and that he had plans to get Warren to confess to Sean Kennedy's (Matthew Jay Lewis) murder. Calvin recorded a confession of both Sean and Louise's murders. However the recorder had broken and the evidence was lost. Calvin was then sacked. In June, Mark made enquiries about Warren's murder and searched for suspect Justin Burton (Chris Fountain). He then arrested Clare Devine (Gemma Bissix).

== Matt Crosby ==
Matt Crosby
- Hollyoaks character
- Portrayed by: Chord Melodic
- Duration: 2008–2009
- First appearance: 10 November 2008
- Last appearance: 26 January 2009
- Created by: Bryan Kirkwood

Matt Crosby is a man who Hannah Ashworth (Emma Rigby) meets during the MTV European Music Awards. Matt's limousine ruins Hannah's dress so he gives her his shirt to wear. After the awards ceremony, Matt returns to Hollyoaks village to see Hannah, and they begin flirting. Her brother Rhys (Andrew Moss) is shocked when Hannah decides to sleep with Matt. Justin Burton (Chris Fountain), who has started to develop feelings for Hannah, catches Matt flirting with another girl. He immediately forces Matt to split up with Hannah and leave.

== Bel Roy ==
Bel Roy
- Hollyoaks character
- Portrayed by: Nila Aalia
- Duration: 2008–2009
- First appearance: 11 November 2008
- Last appearance: 1 October 2009
- Created by: Bryan Kirkwood
In-universe information
- Occupation: Hairdresser
- Husband: Govinda Roy
- Sons: Ash Roy; Ravi Roy
- Daughters: Leila Roy
- Adoptive daughters: Anita Roy

Bel Roy is the mother of Ravi, Leila, Ash and Anita Roy who first appeared in November 2008 with husband Gov. The character left in October 2009.

Bel arrived as a new hairdresser at Evissa. She was favoured by Louise Summers when she got rid of Cindy Cunningham. Bel has made friends with Louise Summers and Carmel Valentine. After Warren Fox killed Louise, Bel recommended to Warren that Carmel should be the new manager. When she discovered Justin Burton accidentally asked Leila to move in, Bel took Leila's clothes to Justin's flat and accused him of just wanting sex. He stated that they are committed. Justin and Leila however split up. On 24 April 2009, the Roys discovered that Anita poured bleach over her legs. Worried, Govinda assumed she did it because she was ashamed of her race. When the school was vandalised, Govinda accused Theresa McQueen, but it was actually Anita, who was fed up of people taking advantage and not listening to her. After Ravi was put in a coma, Ash, who caused it, revealed to Anita that she was adopted by Gov and Bel. Ash tried to lie his way out of it, however Ravi had overheard him telling her. The Roys then disowned Ash. Anita revealed that Gov had covered up her when she stole exam papers, resulting in Gov having to resign. He then got a new job in Middlesbrough, which he and Bel moved to alone.

== Govinda Roy ==
Govinda Roy
- Hollyoaks character
- Portrayed by: Anthony Bunsee
- Duration: 2008–2009
- First appearance: 11 November 2008
- Last appearance: 1 October 2009
- Created by: Bryan Kirkwood
In-universe information
- Occupation: Headmaster
- Mother: Padma Roy
- Wife: Bel Roy
- Sons: Ash Roy; Ravi Roy
- Daughters: Leila Roy
- Adoptive daughters: Anita Roy
- Aunts: Rani Roy

Govinda "Gov" Roy first appeared in November 2008 as the father of Ash, Leila, Ravi, and Anita Roy. He became the new headmaster of Hollyoaks High. The character left in October 2009.

The new headmaster of Hollyoaks High, Gov had high expectations of daughter Leila, who told him she was studying law at college but was studying art. Govinda found out but accepted her decision. His credit card was stolen by Barry "Newt" Newton and Lauren Valentine. Zak Ramsey started working as a trainee P.E. teacher so Govinda showed him around. In March 2009, he suspended Theresa McQueen when he caught her stealing Lydia Hart's purse. Theresa and Carmel McQueen moved in with the Roys when rats infested the McQueens house. On 24 April, the Roys discovered that Anita poured bleach over her legs. Gov was ashamed of her and assumed she was ashamed of her ethnicity. Anita threw a brick through the school's window wearing Theresa's coat, Gov then assumed it was her until Anita admitted she did it. Govinda discovered in May that Anita stole an exam paper containing answers. He sent her home, but found out she did not plan to look at them. After Ravi was put in a coma due to his aneurysm, it was revealed by Ash that Bel and Gov are not Anita's biological parents and had adopted her as a baby. Subsequent to this, Anita went out of control and told Leila and her teacher Des that Gov had not reported her when she stole exam papers. Gov decided to resign. He then got another job in Middlesbrough, where he moved with Bel.

== Ash Roy ==
Ash Roy
- Hollyoaks character
- Portrayed by: Junade Khan
- Duration: 2008–2009
- First appearance: 21 November 2008
- Last appearance: 11 September 2009
- Created by: Bryan Kirkwood
In-universe information
- Father: Govinda Roy
- Mother: Bel Roy
- Brothers: Ravi Roy
- Sisters: Leila Roy; Anita Roy (adoptive)

Ash Roy is the eldest of the Roy siblings. He first appeared in November 2008, the last of his family to arrive. Upon his arrival, Ash appeared as a wealthy, smug businessman. The character left on 11 September 2009 when he was disowned by parents Govinda and Bel for telling sister Anita she was adopted.

Ash started flirting with Mandy Richardson and opened a take-away in Hollyoaks, Relish. He also bought Tan & Tumble from Tony Hutchinson. After buying it, Jacqui McQueen, who was the manager, was never told and was upset. In January 2009, Relish was burnt down by racist Gaz Bennett.

Ash began a relationship with Hannah Ashworth and became a love-rival of Justin, who had developed feelings for her. In March, Hannah and Justin became closer and Ash was jealous. After Josh Ashworth decided to sell his motor bike, Justin made an offer. Ash found out and bought it at a higher price. Justin succeeded in buying it by selling Ste Hay's games console. Ash bought another bike and challenged Justin to a race, which took place in April. Ash tampered with Justin's bike so he could win, but Hannah got on the bike. She fell off and ended up in hospital. Ash told everyone it was Justin who tampered with the bike, but under questioning from Calvin Valentine, he admitted he did not see Justin tampering with it. Leila found out the truth and told Hannah, who then dumped him. To make them think Justin was bad for Hannah, Ash planted food in her room to make it look like she was having a relapse. He told Suzanne Ashworth that Hannah was not eating. After Warren Fox's death, Ash began using Warren's phone to text his foster brother Spencer Gray. Acting as Warren, he told Spencer that he was still alive and needed him to sell The Loft. Spencer sold The Loft to Ash, who was then discovered by Calvin and Sasha Valentine.

Ash started putting Ravi up for illegal street fights, unaware he had been diagnosed with a cerebral aneurysm. Ash found out, yet let Ravi go ahead with a fight, which left him slightly blinded. Leila made Ash accept the blame for it. Ash employed Loretta Jones at Tan & Tumble and both he and Ravi began to have feelings for her. After Loretta saw Ravi's violent side on a date, Ash flirted with her and went in for a kiss, which Ravi caught. Ravi then, despite his condition, signed for another illegal fight. Ash, Loretta, Anita, Kris and Bel all rushed to stop him. After doing so, angry Ravi taunted Ash, which resulted in him punching him, making Ravi fall into a coma. Leila and Anita blamed Ash, who then tried to comfort Anita who was worried she could inherit the aneurysm, however Ash told her she could not, as she was adopted. Ash manipulated Anita into keeping quiet about what he told her, and, to prove it, showed her a birth certificate listing a different mother. Anita told the Roys she knew she was adopted. When confronted, Ash told Bel, Gov and Leila that Anita had found the birth certificate and came to him, however Ravi, who awakened from his coma, told them he was awake when Ash told Anita. Leila, Ravi and Gov then told Ash to leave. Ash pleaded with Bel to choose either him or Ravi. Realising he had ruined the family, Bel also told Ash to leave. Ash then tried to convince Anita and Leila to help his parents forgive him, but both refused. Leila then revealed to Gilly Roach that Ash had planted food in Hannah Ashworth's room to make it look like she had taken a relapse. Ash then closed down Relish and Tan & Tumble and left Hollyoaks.

Chloe Timms from Inside Soap opined that Ash "kicked up trouble" and "caused havoc" in the soap.

== Shelly Newton ==
Shelly Newton
- Hollyoaks character
- Portrayed by: Beverly Denim
- Duration: 2008, 2010
- First appearance: 30 October 2008
- Last appearance: 25 June 2010
- Created by: Bryan Kirkwood
In-universe information
- Sons: Barry Newton; Jenson Newton

Shelly Newton is the biological drug addicted mother of Barry "Newt" Newton. Newt was taken away from Shelly and put into care after she neglected him.

In 2008, Shelly decided not to agree to Newt's adoption by Jack and Frankie Osborne. She then appeared when she met Newt. Shelly asked him to move away with her, which he agreed, however after later discovering she lied about no longer taking drugs. Newt then left Shelly and returned to his foster parents. Shelly returned on 21 June 2010 briefly, along with her new baby, Jensen. She convinced Newt that she had kicked drugs because of her recent pregnancy. She sent Newt out to get the takeaway, and when he returned, she had left the baby behind, with a note saying she was going for a job interview. When she did not return for over a day, Newt began to believe she wasn't coming back, and planned to run off with baby Jensen and girlfriend Rae Wilson. Before they could leave, Shelley returned and told Newt she had found a job in Scotland. Newt agreed to move away with her.

== Yvonne Summers ==
Yvonne Summers
- Hollyoaks character
- Portrayed by: Lysette Anthony
- Duration: 2008–2009
- First appearance: 23 December 2008
- Last appearance: 27 May 2009
- Created by: Bryan Kirkwood
In-universe information
- Daughters: Louise Summers

Yvonne Summers, played by Lysette Anthony, is the mother of Louise Summers who first appeared on 23 December for Louise's wedding to Warren Fox. Following Louise's murder, Yvonne files a missing persons report, unaware Warren had killed her. Yvonne appears in Hollyoaks in May 2009, where she turns up at Warren's flat and tells him that Calvin Valentine informed her that Warren killed Louise's ex-husband Sean Kennedy and also Louise. Yvonne does not know whether to believe Warren or Calvin, until Frankie and Darren Osborne tell her about how Warren framed Frankie's son Jake Dean for Sean's murder. Yvonne leaves, returning days later, where Warren finally confesses to killing Louise. A devastated Yvonne attacks Warren, who retreats to The Loft.

== Other characters ==
Character	Date(s)	Actor	Circumstances
Miss Rice	14 January; 29 May 2008	Alison Mac	A social worker who came to check on Barry "Newt" Newton (Nico Mirallegro) after Nancy Hayton (Jessica Fox) was accused of taking advantage of him. She reappeared later that year to check on Newt.
Robin	22–28 January 2008	Daniel Bayle	Robin was introduced as the new bar man at The Dog in the Pond public house, but was later revealed as a friend of Zak Ramsey (Kent Riley). When Zak and John Paul McQueen (James Sutton) enter The Dog, he was immediately attracted to Robin, but assumed that he was straight. When John Paul learned otherwise, he overcame his nerves and asked Robin out. During a "date" in the SUBar, Robin started kissing John Paul in the toilets. Kieron Hobbs (Jake Hendriks) caught them and warned John Paul that Robin was no good. Nevertheless, John Paul was disappointed to find himself dumped by Robin after Robin had gotten what he wanted.
Journalist	7 February 2008	Charlie Morley	A reporter who interviewed Elliot Bevan (Garnon Davies) when he won a date with "Ripple" model Sarah Barnes (Loui Batley). He repeatedly referred to Elliot as a geek who could never get any woman, much less one like Sarah.
Doctor	22–23 January, 11 February 2008	William Armstrong	He diagnosed Charlie Dean (Charlie Behan) with leukemia, and informed Jake Dean (Kevin Sacre) that Charlie was not his biological son.
Michelle	28 January 2008	Chelsee Healey	Michelle was Danny Valentine's (David Judge) pushy ex-girlfriend. In order to get her off his back, Danny had lied to her that he was joining the army. She tracked him down to Chester and told him they were supposed to get married, a comment he'd made to her only as a joke. Danny's bewildered new girlfriend, Hannah Ashworth (Emma Rigby), told Michelle that Danny had been too much of a coward to break up with her.
Registrar	14 February 2008	Glenda McKay	The registrar who married Jake Dean (Kevin Sacre) and Nancy Hayton (Jessica Fox).
Anthony	18–21 February 2008	Frank Lauder	Anthony was a criminal associate of Warren Fox (Jamie Lomas). Anthony and another man named Carl had attempted a bank robbery and blackmailed Warren into letting them hide out in his flat. While Carl was cool, Anthony was volatile. They took the Osborne family, along with Warren and Warren's girlfriend Louise Summers (Roxanne McKee), hostage when they found out Jack Osborne (Jimmy McKenna) had £100,000 he was prepared to give Warren for his half of The Dog in the Pond public house. The police were called, and Anthony and Carl took Louise and Jack hostage. Jack and his son Darren Osborne (Ashley Taylor Dawson) fought with Carl, leading Anthony to shoot Darren and drive away.
Superintendent Smith	21 February 2008	Tony Osoba	Led the hostage situation outside of The Dog in the Pond public house.
Toby	5–6 March 2008	Craig Daniel Adams	Toby was a gay student John Paul McQueen (James Sutton) kissed after a dare from Kris Fisher (Gerard McCarthy). Toby became obsessed with John Paul or as he nicknamed him "babycakes" and frequently texted him. Only after John Paul lied that he was involved with a married man did a disgusted Toby leave him alone, after commenting on his jeans "Two words: Simon Cowell."
Judge Trent	10 March 2008	Jonathan Keeble	Judge Trent presided over the custody battle between Jake (Kevin Sacre) and Nancy Dean (Jessica Fox).
Ms. Kapoor	10 March 2008	Nicole Arumagan	Ms. Kapoor represented Jake Dean (Kevin Sacre) in the custody battle.
Cafcass Officer	12–13 March 2008	Olwen May	The officer who interviewed Jake Dean (Kevin Sacre) and then his wife Nancy Dean (Jessica Fox) about whether they were fit to raise Charlie Dean (Charlie Behan).
WPC	12 March 2008	Francesca Larkin	The police officer who arrested Jake Dean (Kevin Sacre) for his attempted rape of his wife Nancy Dean (Jessica Fox).
Christine Walker	19 March 2008	Stacey Sampson	A reporter for the Chester Herald who wrote an article about Leah Barnes' (Elà-May Demircan) leukemia.
Doctor	19 March 2008	Robert Calvery	A doctor who treated Jake Dean (Kevin Sacre) after he was sectioned.
Marie-Chantelle	21 March 2008	Alicia Hall	Marie-Chantelle was the leader of a gang of girls who roughed up Dominic Reilly (John Pickard) for his money, leaving him emasculated.
Jennifer Kiddle	2 April 2008	Kate Hodgson	The wife of lecturer Roger Kiddle (Quentin Tibble). Roger had neglected to inform his girlfriend Sarah Barnes (Loui Batley) that he was married. A furious Sarah soon told Jennifer the truth; Jennifer poured her wine glass over Roger's head and stormed out of the SUBar.
Detective Inspector Tyler	14 April-15 May 2008	Natasha Alexander	The detective investigated the murder of Sean Kennedy she has also arrested Louise Summers (Roxanne McKee), Jacqui McQueen (Claire Cooper) and Warren Fox (Jamie Lomas).
Nurse	14 April 2008	Charlene Hanson	When Sarah Barnes (Loui Batley) and Mike Barnes (Tony Hirst) wanted to find out about the health of baby Leah Barnes (Elà-May Demircan), they asked the nurse. Her response led to their realisation that Leah's mother Amy Barnes (Ashley Slanina-Davies) had lied about Leah having leukemia.
Young P.C.	21 April 2008	Jonathan Howard	The police officer told the Ashworth family that Rhys Ashworth (Andrew Moss) and Beth Clement (Sinéad Moynihan) had been involved in a car accident.
Doctor	21 April 2008	John Sheerman	The doctor told the Ashworths that Rhys Ashworth (Andrew Moss) would be recover from the car accident, however Beth Clement (Sinéad Moynihan) had died before the paramedics could reach her.
Reporter	1 May 2008	Sasha Frost	A news report working for the Chester Herald, she interviewed Carmel McQueen (Gemma Merna) about the campaign to free Louise Summers (Roxanne McKee).
Sam	12–13 May 2008	Judith Imelda Jones	Sam caught the eye of Zak Ramsey (Kent Riley), Elliot Bevan (Garnon Davies), and Kris Fisher (Gerard McCarthy) when she walked into the SUBar. Zak won her attention, and took her back to the dorm. All was well until the morning after, when he was disgusted by her long armpit hair. He began to distance himself from her until Elliot and Kris told him to give her a chance. Sam asked why he was so hot and cold with her. When he told her, she slapped him and stormed out of his life.
Thug	28 May, 22 July 2008	Darren Connolly	Louise Summers (Roxanne McKee) had him smash glasses at The Dog in the Pond public house and take money from the till after she believed Frankie Osborne (Helen Pearson) had vandalized Evissa. He returned after Jack Osborne's (Jimmy McKenna) presumed death, demanding the money Jack owed. Warren Fox (Jamie Lomas) gave him a small payment and asked him to give Frankie some time.
Nurse	6 June 2008	Clare Lever	The nurse who treated Amy Barnes (Ashley Slanina-Davies) after Ste Hay (Kieron Richardson) burned her arm.
Nicky	6 June 2008	Lisa Marie Graham	Nicky worked at a fish market and Dominic Reilly (John Pickard) set up her on a blind date with Max Cunningham (Matt Littler). They got along well, but he was still interested in Steph Dean (Carley Stenson), and Nicky surprised him by telling him she was more interested in Dom.
Marie Wood	18 June 2008	Janine Birkett	Marie was a journalist for the Chester Herald. Wanting to annoy Frankie Osborne (Helen Pearson), Louise Summers (Roxanne McKee) asked Marie to come to the Dog so she could talk to Louise and Frankie for a positive press piece about Warren Fox (Jamie Lomas).
Colin Perrose	15 July 2008	Christopher Chilton	Colin inspected The Dog in the Pond public house following complaints that they were watering down their drinks.
Father John	28 November 2008	Ray Callaghan	Father John was the Catholic Priest from Belfast that conducted the marriage of Mercedes McQueen (Jennifer Metcalfe) and Malachy Fisher (Glen Wallace). He appeared in the final episode of Hollyoaks Later.
