= Nancy Hayton =

Fictional character from Hollyoaks

- Hollyoaks character
- Portrayed by: Jessica Fox
- Duration: 2005–present
- First appearance: 6 July 2005
- Introduced by: Jo Hallows
- Book appearances: Hollyoaks: Playing With Fire (2006)
- Spin-off appearances: Hollyoaks Later (2008, 2010, 2012, 2020); Hollyoaks: A Little Film About Love (2011)
- Crossover appearances: Brookside (2025)
In-universe information
- Other names: Nancy Osborne; Nancy Dean
- Occupation: Teacher
- Family: Osborne
- Father: Charles Hayton
- Mother: Margaret Hayton
- Sisters: Becca Hayton
- Husband: Jake Dean (2008–2009); Darren Osborne (2012–2013, 2014–2020, 2022–present)
- Sons: Oscar Osborne
- Daughters: Morgan Osborne
- Adoptive sons: Phoenix Hathaway; Charlie Dean
- Stepsons: JJ Osborne
- Stepdaughters: Frankie Osborne
- Nephews: Charlie Dean

Nancy Osborne (also Hayton and Dean) is a fictional character from the British Channel 4 soap opera Hollyoaks, played by Jessica Fox. The character first appeared on 6 July 2005. Since the character's inception she has been involved in many notable storylines such as a love triangle; coping with the death of her sister Becca (Ali Bastian); marrying Jake Dean (Kevin Sacre); drug abuse; domestic violence; being the victim of two attempted rapes by Jake and Finn O'Connor (Keith Rice); marrying Darren Osborne (Ashley Taylor Dawson); suffering a miscarriage; prematurely giving birth to Darren's son, Oscar Osborne, who is deaf; an addiction to painkillers; a highly-publicised storyline where Sienna Blake (Anna Passey) attempts to steal Darren and her family away from her; getting brain damage after an attack from Sienna; an affair with Rick Spencer (Victor Gardener); and a fling with Rick's son Robbie Roscoe (Charlie Wernham). Her later storylines have seen the character be diagnosed with multiple sclerosis; discovering Darren's affair with her friend Mandy Richardson (Sarah Jayne Dunn), leading to the couple's separation; a relationship with Kyle Kelly (Adam Rickitt); miscarrying Kyle's baby after being stabbed; and dealing with Kyle's suicide. In the character's early stages, she was portrayed as a less conventional character compared to the rest of the Hollyoaks teenagers. Fox left the series on 23 March 2023 so she could go on maternity leave, and she returned on 15 January 2024. On 22 October Nancy along with many other Hollyoaks characters appeared in the anniversary episode that crossed over with former soap Brookside.

== Character creation and casting ==
Nancy was created as the younger sister of Becca, who arrives to visit. The character was initially only intended to feature in three episodes. Auditions were held for the role with actress Jessica Fox securing the role. Fox auditioned for the role and was given the part. She began filming the next day for which she said she was "completely underprepared" for and "scared out of [her] witts". She was initially contracted for three episodes but on Fox's second day of filming, she was given more scripts and asked to stay on longer which she agreed to, before she was again given more scripts. She has since remained on the serial. Fox extended her contract in January 2012 and predicted that the year would feature Nancy's "biggest storyline" so far.

== Development ==
=== Characterisation ===
On Nancy's personality, Fox described her as different from other Hollyoaks girls, dubbing her the "anti-Hollyoaks girl". She said that Nancy has "always got some kind of bitchy comeback for everyone". She explained that Nancy "says that you don't have to be the skinny blonde or the skinny brunette, you can be the one who does whatever the hell she likes". After the character had gone through certain transformations, the actress spoke about these changes saying: "Nancy's gone full circle and she's had the chance to become a whole character, rather than just one who has no end of tragedy and no end of silly affairs". Fox has said that her character is "a control freak. Nancy has very definite ideas of what she wants and what she doesn't". She added that Nancy is "a bit posh and stiff" and "uptight" but that she can get "really wild" when she has "had a few drinks". Fox has described Nancy as "a bit of a moral compass for the show. She knows what's right and she's often the voice of that. I think that's a really good role for her, and it's quite an important one. I think it's quite good to have a strong, intelligent woman in the show". She added that Nancy "has a very short fuse and loses her temper quickly".

On Nancy, E4's official Hollyoaks website say: "they say good things come in small packages and that's definitely the case when it comes to Nancy, the feistiest fun-size female in Hollyoaks. [...] Nancy has been determined to establish herself as a career woman - though she hasn't always been sure what career". A Channel 4 official Hollyoaks website states that Nancy is vibrant and eccentric" and feisty". What's on TV described Nancy as "fiercely protective of her quirky appearance" and as having "a tough personality". They added that the character "has weathered the numerous tragedies in her life". Holy Soap describes the character as "cool and independent and a total mess".

Nancy's hair has dominated her many styles and she has had several different hair colours. When asked about her character's "crazy" hair styles Fox revealed that the ideas for the styles are a collaboration of her own ideas and the production teams': "I had a brown bob forever and I was sick to death of it, so when we came out of the Jake storyline last year, they wanted to change the image. They asked me if I wanted to dye it any colour, so I thought 'let's go red'". Fox said that her initial Hollyoaks image featuring green hair was "definitely not a good look". She added that during her tenura Nancy has had a "few hair disasters", especially the in between stages when she "went back to black from red and then to blonde". She said that since her character has been through so much she no longer feels it necessary to "desperately shock" everyone with her hair styles as she has had to grow up and evolve. Fox said she enjoys Nancy's style which has "evolved" as she has "been a Goth, she's been a New Romantic and now I like to call her Dusty Springfield on acid! It's a bit Duffy, a bit ’50s-style, and now I’ve got the red hair it gives us more to play with". Fox added that "one of my favourite things about being in a soap for a long time - I do get to change my image a lot". She said that she enjoys the feedback she receives from her style changes and when her latest style was aired and she had "cut it into a short bob, I got so many tweets from people - some negative, but mostly positive thankfully". She said that she would be open to changing her image in future. Fox has also commented on Nancy's large tattoo on her back, which she deemed to be "too masculine". Fox said that when she was initially on the serial she found it "great to be different" but felt that it was difficult playing the "alternative" character of Nancy when her colleagues were such "gorgeous, glamorous women". The tattoo has since disappeared. Of the character's dress sense the Hollyoaks wardrobe department said "Nancy Hayton has a unique distinctive look on Hollyoaks. She wears rich colours and vibrant patterns, which compliment [sic] her slim shape".

=== Introduction and drug abuse ===
Nancy arrives in the village to visit Becca. Bastian told a reporter from Inside Soap that "Becca's flabbergasted when Nancy turns up!" The pair have not seen each other for some time and Nancy has changed. Nancy is a punk and more "strong-willed" than Becca remembers her. The actress added that Nancy is nothing like Becca. Her arrival gives Becca someone to confide in with her relationship with Justin Burton (Chris Fountain).

Nancy forms a relationship with former tattoo artist Foz. The relationship sees her becoming dependent on him mainly because he was a hippy and free, which at the time represented everything Nancy stood for. During her relationship with Foz, the character begins abusing drugs. Fox revealed how her character's longing to fit in with people like Foz who were different from the rest of society, ended with her taking drugs to be different from others but the same as the hippy scene. Fox spoke about this saying: "I think Nancy's character is very strong, she's opinionated, but if you take all that away she's still very young particularly then, at the time of the drug storyline she was 16 she still wanted desperately to fit in even though she told everyone she didn't. At that particular party she was at she was surrounded by all these people who were traveling, really into their music, they had the life style that Nancy wanted, and she just desperately wanted to fit in at the end of the day, and that's what happens she took LSD and it went horribly wrong".

=== Jake Dean ===
During Nancy's relationship with Jake Dean, Nancy's character was rapidly transformed due to her abuse at the hands of Jake. Fox told a journalist from OK! that when the relationship begins Jake is "very controlling" towards Nancy and he takes away "all the things that made Nancy Nancy – the way she was opinionated and outspoken". She explained that during the storyline Nancy acts out of character which she found challenging to portray. She added that Nancy's abuse at the hands of Jake is psychological abuse rather than physical abuse. Sacre explained that Nancy wants to call off the wedding but Jake "dismisses her concerns and insists the wedding goes ahead. He's kind of bulldozing his way through it all". He added that Jake Nancy still does not feel the wedding is right after he makes the arrangements but Jake still "keeps on pushing and pushing and she gives in". Sacre said that Nancy regrets marrying Jake as soon as she has gone through with the wedding. Jake "ends up trying to force himself on her on their wedding night". Sacre commented that in reaction to this Jake "plays the victim and tries to blame Nancy for what's happened". The actor revealed that while Jake is in "a desperate state" he accidentally tells Nancy that he made allegations that she was having a sexual relationship with a pupil. Nancy is "incensed". Fox stated that she and the production team were careful not to have the character return to her previous self, saying: "We've tried really hard to make sure that Nancy didn't just snap back into her old self after the whole Jake incident last year. There's always a bit of darkness with her. That's something that really annoys me in soap, when something really dramatic happens to a character and they forget about it a couple of weeks later".

=== Bisexual love triangle ===
In another storyline Nancy became romantically involved with both Kris Fisher and Ravi Roy, who also begin a relationship unbeknownst to Nancy. Fox said that when series producer Bryan Kirkwood told her of the storyline she was initially pleased as she had always felt that Kris and Nancy "would go well together" but when he revealed the full details, that Nancy would also be involved with Ravi at the same time she was "quite shocked". She expanded on this, saying: "Nancy's never cheated on anyone in her life because that's not who she is. But Bryan said to me 'we're going to have a lot of fun with this and I want it to be like a Carry on with loads of door-shutting and times when you don't know who's going to get caught'. So that's what we went for in the end". Fox explained that upon Nancy discovering that Kris and Ravi have been having a relationship she thought she would "be flying in there, fists flailing, but this has completely stumped her. For the first time ever, Nancy has nothing to say. She just bolts". She added that Nancy is "speechless" which is different for her as "she's always got a comeback for everyone, but in this case she just doesn't do anything". Fox said that Nancy has "no right" to be angry with Kris and Ravi as they have all been having sex with each other without the other knowing. Nancy, Kris and Ravi decide to carry on having relationships with each other with each other's consent, Fox was shocked when she learned of this development, saying: "No words could describe how I felt when I read it for the first time!" The actress revealed that Hollyoaks' time slot restricted the characters having a threesome so instead the characters having an open three-way relationship was introduced. Fox explained that when Nancy begins the three-way relationship she soon realises she is not comfortable with it so she decides to end the relationship. She added Nancy wants a relationship with "someone who'll love and look after her. Deep down, she wants that security which a conventional relationship brings as she hasn't had that for so long".

=== Darren Osborne ===
Nancy begins a relationship with Darren Osborne (Ashley Taylor Dawson). Fox commented that the relationship "came out of nowhere" but because the writers and audience were "charmed" it was kept long term. Fox told Laura-Jane Tyler of Inside Soap that she "never thought they were going to last, but we just went for it full throttle". Fox added that she was initially surprised when she heard the about the pairing. She explained that "it was only ever intended to be quite a short-term thing". Dawson also said that he was initially surprised when their characters were paired together, adding that the initial scene in which the pair got together was "absolutely hilarious. Darren just looked up and there she was!"

Dawson explained that the two are "complete opposites" as Darren is a "male chauvinist pig" while Nancy is a "feminist" but "somewhere in all the madness, they seem to be on the same page". He added that the pair bring out the best in each other and "work well together and they challenge each other all the time. It's quite comical, even when they're arguing. In many ways, Darren is a typical man and Nancy is a typical woman". Fox commented that the pair would make good parents but have "a lot of growing up to do themselves", before adding that she hoped Nancy and Darren would stay together for a long time" as she enjoyed the pairing. On Darren's feelings for Nancy, Dawson said she has "really calmed Darren down. He's totally in love with her". He added that the pair share a "tempestuous relationship, even if it's also very sweet". On Darren's feelings for Nancy, Dawson said: "He's besotted with her. He feels she's good for him and that he almost doesn't deserve her. He feels like a bit of a failure and Nancy is this strong woman who's organised and everything Darren isn't". Dawson felt that Nancy is the love of Darren's life and that she had helped Darren mature. Dawson said that Darren and Nancy have "know each other for a long time" and that they "work well together".

On 19 December 2011 Digital Spy announced that a future storyline would see Darren plan the couple's wedding as a surprise for Nancy. Dawson explained that it is initially Darren's idea to have a surprise wedding as he is content with his life and wants a way to "show Nancy how much he loves her and thinks a surprise wedding will do that". Dawson felt that this was not a good idea as Nancy would want a "classy" wedding which Darren can not afford. He said that when Nancy discovers his plans Darren expects she will be "delighted" but Nancy is "the sort of woman who'd be fussy about her wedding" so she may not react how Darren would expect. Fox said that Nancy would "be horrified [...] because she is a control freak. [...] I don't know if it's Darren's wisest move, but I think Nancy would also see that he has good intentions". Dawson felt that Darren is "incredibly excited" for the wedding, especially because of the hard work and planning he has put into it. He said that as far as Darren is "concerned, it's going to be the most perfect day possible and he just can't wait to see the look on Nancy's face when she realises what he's been up to". Dawson added that in his opinion, Nancy and Darren are the "perfect match and are incredibly sweet together". He expressed that Darren "brings out Nancy's fun side and she gives his life a bit of order" and felt that the couple are "destined to be the Jack and Vera of Hollyoaks!"

To coincide the storyline it was announced Nancy's mother, Margaret Hayton would return to the serial with the possibility of causing trouble for Darren's wedding plans. Fox revealed that Margaret would decide to split Nancy and Darren up as she believes Nancy can do better. She said Margaret would be "quite vindictive" while doing this and she would "try to make Nancy doubt her relationship with Darren. It's underhand and cruel, because she plays on Nancy's insecurities and self-doubt. Margaret starts making Nancy feel very insecure in the relationship, and she also starts to feel quite unsure about her future in Hollyoaks".

Fox revealed that Darren's ex-girlfriend, Cindy Cunningham would become involved in the storyline when Margaret begins trying to "push" Cindy and Darren together. Nancy begins to suspect Darren is having an affair with Cindy which begins because he has "been behaving a bit strangely" while planning the secret wedding. When Cindy helps Darren with planning the wedding they embrace which is witnessed by Nancy which "confirms everything that she thought. To Nancy, it seems that everything her mum is saying is true - that Darren doesn't love her and he has been having an affair". Her portrayer explained that she would have expected Nancy to confront Cindy but Nancy can not "bring herself to do it. [...] you see that this relationship has meant more to Nancy than any other. She's deeply, deeply hurt". Dawson explained that the storyline is "just a case of Nancy getting things misconstrued" and that it is not an "obvious affair plot".

Nancy and Darren marry. Fox explained that "getting married is important to Nancy. For all her wanting to be alternative and different, she really just wants to be loved". Dawson said that Darren is relieved that the wedding goes ahead as he worries that Nancy is "too good for him". On how marriage will affect the couple Dawson said: "the only way it will change them is by giving a bit of solidity to their relationship. It proves to both of them how much they mean to each other, so if anything, I think it will make them stronger". Commenting on the couple's future Dawson said that children are "definitely something that they both want, as everything's going well [...] Now that they're married, having children is something that they'll look at in the future". Fox said that Nancy's life is going well and she has a "got this big family that care about her, having had no-one for so long". She added that her character "loves Darren to pieces" and she wanted to get married and then "have babies and be happy. I think that's what she really wants". She teased that Nancy may not immediately want children but she may not have a choice in the matter.

=== Miscarriage and premature birth ===
Fox revealed that "there's some really big, emotional stuff coming up" for the couple and that herself and Dawson "spent the last three weeks of filming crying non-stop". She said that the serial "will really explore Darren and Nancy's relationship this year, and I can't wait to see how it all plays out". Nancy soon feels that she may be pregnant, Fox said that if Nancy were pregnant "It would be great to watch them trying to cope with it", adding that the potential scenes would be "hilarious". Nancy discovers she is pregnant and suffers a pregnancy scare. Fox told an Inside Soap reported that if Nancy suffered a miscarriage the couple's relationship may not survive. Her portrayer explained that Nancy begins to suffer stomach pains and blood loss but believes going to the hospital will solve the problem. Fox said that Nancy is in "quite a lot of pain and is really frightened" and she "knows that there's a real possibility she could lose the baby, but that's too awful for her to contemplate". Nancy suffers a miscarriage which Fox said is a "really traumatic time" for both Nancy and Darren. She said that Nancy feels like she has "failed, which is something she doesn't deal with very well". The actress added that the miscarriage will "be a really difficult thing for her to ever get over". Fox revealed that the scenes took "three or four weeks" to film the "quite intense" material. She felt that the scripts for the scenes were "some of the best scripts I've ever had. The way that it was written just felt really true, and it wasn't hard to conjure up that emotion". Speaking on This Morning, Fox said she was stopped in the street by people who praised the storyline as being true to life which she said was "overwhelming". Dawson felt the storyline was being "very true to life" as the scenes are "what people go through. It's nice that they're holding onto that and it doesn't just end there. It's an ongoing thing like any relationship, so it's just nice to do it justice. The feedback's been great".

Nancy soon after becomes pregnant. Nancy begins helping her friend, Mitzeee (Rachel Shenton) who has escaped from prison. Mitzeee was in prison for the stabbing of Mercedes McQueen (Jennifer Metcalfe), Fox explained that Nancy has "always known her friend was innocent" as she knows that she is not capable of stabbing Mercedes. Nancy knows Mercedes has set Mitzeee up as she has threatened her on a couple of occasions, even saying "something bad might happen to Nancy's baby if she doesn't get her nose out and that's made Nancy more determined". Fox said that Nancy's attitude towards Mitzeee's situation stems from when Becca was wrongly accused, sent to prison and murdered in jail which makes her "really desperate to get this right for Mitzeee - to get her out and take Mercedes down!" Explaining why Nancy and Mitzeee are such good friends, Fox said: "They're such different people on the surface, but deep down Ann Minniver - Mitzeee's alter ego - is very moral, kind and caring and she's a very clever girl. I think those are all things that Nancy responds to and enjoys. Also, I think Mitzeee just makes Nancy laugh. Mitzeee can be a bit silly sometimes, and that makes Nancy smile". During the storyline, Nancy feuds with Mercedes. Fox said that Nancy has a bit of a "bad girl" in her which she shows during her confrontations with Mercedes, adding that the character has got "more fire in her belly than maybe we'd realised".

Nancy does not tell Darren that she is helping Mitzeee, which Fox told a reporter from What's on TV is because "Darren is so focused on the baby that if she told him he'd be really angry. Nancy feels he doesn't understand the relationship she has with Mitzeee and he hasn't been terribly supportive". When questioned if Nancy feels her involvement with Mitzeee may place strain on the baby, Fox answered: "At the moment she feels incredibly tired, but she's sure that everything's fine and all she needs to do is focus on her friend". Darren discovers Nancy is helping Mitzeee, making him "absolutely furious" as he can not believe Nancy is "going against the law, is running around and getting stressed - especially while she's heavily pregnant". When urged to put their child first by Darren, Nancy dismisses him as she believes he is "just being silly". Fox said that "Nancy thinks she knows best, as Nancy always does", adding that Nancy is "a bit like a dog with a bone. If she's decided that she's going to do something, it's very difficult to change her mind".

While Nancy is with Mitzeee, she gets "sudden twinges" which she does not worry about until "the contractions really start to kick in. She's only 26 weeks' pregnant and she's totally terrified". Nancy calls Darren who takes her to hospital where she is "doubled over in agony". The doctors try giving Nancy medication to stop the contractions which fails. Nancy has an emergency Caesarean and gives birth to a boy who the doctors are unsure if he will "make it through the night" which Fox said is a "terrible time for Nancy and Darren". Darren blames Nancy for their babies premature birth, Dawson explained that this is because he believes that Nancy did not "take proper care of herself during her pregnancy". He said that Nancy seemed to be preoccupied with Mitzeee and "wouldn't listen to him when he told her to back off. In his heart of hearts, Darren feels she's responsible for all of this". Fox revealed that she researched premature births, reading up on the subject and attending a meeting at the Liverpool Women's Hospital along with a writer for the serial. There, Fox spoke to a midwife who deals specifically with premature babies, which she found "really helpful". The actress added that although the serial tried to stay true to life there is "a bit of artistic licence that goes into the scripts, to make things more dramatic or to let the story flow better". On how Nancy would behave as a mother, Fox said: "I imagine that she'll be a bit of a neurotic mother, particularly as the baby has arrived so early. I think she'd want to wrap him up in cotton wool and not let him out of her sight".

== Storylines ==
Nancy arrives in the village to visit sister Becca Dean (Ali Bastian) and later begins living with Becca. Nancy has a brief relationship with Justin, who is having a secret relationship with Becca and uses Nancy to make Becca jealous. Nancy enters a relationship with Foz. Nancy and Hannah Ashworth (Emma Rigby) babysit for Mandy Richardson (Sarah Jayne Dunn) and Tony Hutchinson's (Nick Pickard) daughter, Grace. Nancy and Hannah discover Grace dead and blame themselves until they are informed Grace died of SIDS. Nancy begins dealing with the fall out of Becca's affair with her pupil Justin, whilst trying to keep her own relationship with Foz together. Nancy abuses recreational drugs in a bid to fit in with Foz. When Becca is murdered in prison, Nancy is left to care for her nephew Charlie Dean. Foz soon after leaves to go travelling. Nancy begins taking prescription drugs while taking her A-level examinations.

Nancy and Becca's husband Jake enter a secret relationship. Jake begins to control Nancy. Jake proposes to Nancy, who accepts. When Nancy begins tutoring Newt (Nico Mirallegro), Jake becomes convinced that Nancy will cheat on him with Newt, due to Becca's infidelity with a student. When his attempts to control Nancy fails, he reports her to the police, making allegations she is having an affair with Newt; she is arrested and later fired. Fearing Nancy is not taking the allegations seriously, Jake verbally attacks her, branding her pathetic. She cries and begins blaming herself but Jake then comforts her, turning the situation around in his favour. Nancy is later cleared of the charges. Jake begins to distance her from her friends, deleting messages from her phone. Nancy discovers this and goes out with Hannah and Sarah Barnes (Loui Batley), who tell Nancy they dislike Jake and his treatment of Nancy. Nancy denies that Jake is mistreating her, further distancing herself from them. Jake later breaks her phone so that she can not contact them. When Charlie falls ill, Nancy is unable to call for an ambulance so she has to leave Charlie and go for help. Jake blames Nancy for Charlie's condition. Charlie is diagnosed with leukaemia and needs a bone marrow transplant, leading to Nancy discovering Jake is not a donor match and thus not Charlie's biological father.

Nancy reluctantly agrees to a rushed wedding in a hospital chapel and Jake controls all the arrangements. When Hannah and Sarah try to persuade her not to go through with the wedding, Nancy becomes hysterical and forbids them attending. The wedding reception is poorly attended and Nancy, subdued, has to be coaxed into dancing. Nancy returns to her flat to sleep, but Jake grabs Nancy and violently attempts to rape her until Steph Dean (Carley Stenson) walks into the flat. Nancy regrets marrying Jake and when he launches a tirade of insults at her, she realises that Jake lied to the police about Newt. Nancy leaves Jake despite his pleas for her to stay. A custody battle ensues with Nancy enlisting Charlie's biological father (Chris Fountain) to help her to gain custody of him. Nancy reveals to Jake's mother Frankie Osborne (Helen Pearson) and the customers of The Dog in the Pond that Jake tried to rape her, with Steph backing her up.

Jake kidnaps Charlie and attempts to kill him and himself by gassing his car. Nancy finds them and saves Charlie but leaves Jake for dead. Jake wakes up minutes after and leaves the car. Jake breaks into Nancy's flat, violently attacking her. He tries to take Charlie but Nancy hits Jake with a frying pan, rendering hum unconscious. Jake is later sectioned. Frankie obtains custody of Charlie. Nancy begins dating Ravi Roy (Stephan Uppal) however she begins an affair with Kris Fisher (Gerard McCarthy), who is also having sex with Ravi. When Nancy discovers this she decides to keep seeing both Ravi and Kris, but she ends both relationships when Ravi and Kris kiss in her presence. When Russ Owen (Stuart Manning) saves Nancy from being attacked by student Gaz Bennett (Joel Goonan), the pair begin a relationship. Russ asks Nancy to run away with him and his son Max McQueen, but she offers him an ultimatum, her or Max; initially he chooses Nancy but when he admits Nancy is a consolation prize she has sex with Kris and is caught by Russ, who is unable to forgive Nancy so he kidnaps Max and leaves Hollyoaks.

Nancy is told that Jake is being released from the psychiatric hospital so she visits him, telling him she hates him and warning him to stay away from her. Jake tells her he has nowhere else to go and he soon returns to the village. Nancy resumes her relationship with Kris who sees how affected she is by Jake's return and supports her. Nancy calls the police when she witnesses Jake meeting with Charlie. Jake is arrested for breaking his bail terms but is released when it is explained that the meeting was accidental. It is decided it is unsafe to have Charlie live with Frankie, so she gives Nancy custody to prevent him being put in care. Nancy and Kris end their relationship. Jake's ex-girlfriend Loretta Jones (Melissa Walton) begins stalking him and only Nancy believes him. Loretta takes Nancy hostage. Jake comes to Nancy's rescue and convinces Loretta to have herself sectioned in, which she does. Nancy admits she believes Jake has changed and Jake later leaves Hollyoaks village.

Nancy decides to become a journalist and plans to write a report on Mitzeee (Rachel Shenton). Nancy accompanies Mitzeee to a footballer's party. There, Nancy meets Dean, who Mitzeee warns Nancy of. Nancy does not take any notice and is drugged and almost gang-raped by Dean and his friends, but she is saved by Mitzeee. Nancy later bonds with Mitzeee. Nancy, Darren Osborne (Ashley Taylor Dawson) and sisters Texas (Bianca Hendricks Spendlove) and India Longford (Beth Kingston) begin online dating. Nancy and Darren realise they have feelings for each other and begin a relationship. India is murdered after going on a date she set up online, upsetting Nancy who comforts Texas. Nancy and Darren become engaged but she ends their relationship when Suzanne Ashworth (Suzanne Hall) returns to the village, pregnant with Darren's twins. After Suzanne gives birth, she returns to Spain and Nancy and Darren reunite. Lynsey Nolan (Karen Hassan) is attacked and claims that Nancy's colleague and friend Silas Blissett (Jeff Rawle) is responsible and that he also killed India. Nancy doubts Lynsey and clashes with her, but when it is revealed Silas is guilty, several villagers believe Nancy knew of Silas' guilt. Nancy blames herself for failing to believe Lynsey and for not seeing Silas' guilt but she is ultimately forgiven by the villagers and Lynsey. Mitzeee discovers her boyfriend, Warren Fox (Jamie Lomas) killed his ex-girlfriend Louise Summers (Roxanne McKee). Mitzeee writes the details in a letter which she gives to Nancy, telling her to only open it if something happens to her. Nancy reads the letter when Warren starts acting suspiciously and saves Mitzeee's life as a result.

Darren begins planning a surprise wedding for Nancy on Valentine's Day. However, Nancy grows suspicious that Darren is having an affair with his ex-girlfriend, Cindy Cunningham (Stephanie Waring). Nancy's mother, Margaret, visits and fuels Nancy's doubts. Nancy decides to leave to live with her mother in Canada but she is stopped by Darren who reveals his plan. Nancy forgives Darren and they marry. Nancy begins to suspect that she may be pregnant and confesses this to Darren. They take a pregnancy test together and discover she is pregnant. Weeks later, after an argument with Darren, Nancy suffers a miscarriage. They agree to try for another baby and Nancy soon after discovers she is pregnant again. Darren and Nancy discover they are having a boy. Nancy supports Mitzeee when she is falsely imprisoned for stabbing Mercedes McQueen (Jennifer Metcalfe). Nancy is convinced Mercedes stabbed herself and she helps Mitzeee when she escapes from prison. Darren discovers Nancy is helping Mitzeee and tells her to stop as she will endanger their baby. Nancy begins having pains when she is helping Mitzeee and she is taken to hospital. There, she is told she is in labour. Nancy is given medication to prevent her giving birth but when this fails, she is given an emergency caesarean she gives birth to their son three months premature who she and Darren christen Oscar Osborne. Darren soon after asks Nancy for a divorce. When Nancy collapses with a blood clot she soon after recovers and Darren apologies, telling her he will be a better husband and father and they reunite.

In January 2013, Nancy Darren and Oscar went to visit Ruth in London. In June, Nancy and Darren's marriage came close to breaking as Darren found out the full extent of Nancy's pill problems when Sienna Blake (Anna Passey) tricked him into hiding a present in Nancy's laptop bag, knowing he would find pills. Nancy's mother dies in a car accident and before leaving for Canada, Nancy tells Sienna to take care of Darren. Nancy returns but is shocked to find Darren and Sienna in bed. In August 2013, Nancy is devastated when Sienna announces that she is pregnant with Darren's baby. Sienna tells Nancy that she can take Oscar and Charlie, but when Nancy leaves with the kids, Sienna harms herself to make it look like Nancy attacked her, and then tells the police that she has kidnapped them. Police start searching for Nancy, who hears on the radio that they think she kidnapped the children. After being chased by police, her car is suspended over a multi-story car-park. She, Charlie and Oscar escape before the car goes over. Upon giving Charlie and Oscar to Darren, she furiously scolds Sienna about the lie she made before Nancy being arrested. She is later sectioned in a psychiatric ward. In October 2013, Tom visits Nancy as a wish from John Paul McQueen (James Sutton), where Tom breaks the news that Sienna has been doing some things whilst she was absent. When Tom goes missing, Darren convinces Sienna to change her statement so Nancy can be released. Nancy returns to the village and unknown to her and everyone else, Sienna is holding Tom hostage in the basement of her childhood home. Tom escapes and finds Nancy who confronts Sienna in front of everyone. Sienna tries to tell them that Nancy is lying again and Nancy furiously attacks her before ripping of her dress, exposing her fake pregnancy to the guests.

In 2014, her and Darren reunite and decide to get remarried but Finn O'Connor (Keith Rice) attempts to rape her, leaving her traumatised. She later recognises Finn as her rapist and along with John Paul, want him sent down. However, Nancy admits to Darren that she slept with Rick Spencer (Victor Gardener) She is later kissed by her student Robbie Roscoe (Charlie Wernham), leaving her shocked. Darren moves out of the pub and into a caravan. Nancy was drawn back to painkillers in late 2014, she got some from Trevor Royle (Greg Wood) but they ended up being spread around the school, causing everyone to fall ill, whilst Nancy is in charge. Jack and Frankie discover what Nancy has done and when the police arrive at the Dog, Jack takes the wrap and has to do community service, angering Frankie. Nancy becomes more desperate for pills so Frankie locks her in the bathroom but Nancy climbs out the window and onto the ledge, she slips and falls off, being caught by Joe Roscoe (Ayden Callaghan). In March 2015, she is embroiled in a love triangle between Darren's half-brothers, Joe and Robbie. She sleeps with Joe but they break up after she learns about Kim Butterfield (Daisy Wood-Davis) Robbie and Nancy spend the night together in a car, but nothing happens after. In August, Sienna suspects Nancy of having an affair with her fiance' Ben Bradley (Ben Richards) causing Sienna to have a catfight publicly in the Dog and spike Nancy's water with sleeping pills. In October 2015, Nancy admits to Esther Bloom (Jazmine Franks) that she still loves Darren and she reports John Paul to the school board after finding a hotel booking for Harry Thompson (Parry Glasspool) and Ste Hay (Kieron Richardson) but Harry had put Ste down as Mr. McQueen, causing Nancy to suspect John Paul of having an affair with Harry. Charlie, her nephew later becomes isolated, worrying Nancy and Darren, Nancy later discovers that Lindsey murdered Dr. Charles S'avage and she lies to the police for her. Nancy admits to Darren she loves him but he rejects her, but they soon reunite and get engaged.

In 2016, Nancy discovers that Darren and Maxine buried Patrick Blake's (Jeremy Sheffield) body in the City Wall and she agrees to keep it a secret. When Nancy, Darren and Maxine are talking about Patrick's death they are overheard by someone. This person is thought to be Neeta Kaur (Amrit Maghera) who takes a sudden dislike to Darren, but this is because of Darren grabbing Maxine, it is later revealed that Nico Blake (Persephone Swales-Dawson) was the one who overheard them. In July 2016, after discovering that Warren might know about Patrick's body in the wall, Nancy, along with Darren move Patrick's body into the woods. Darren and Nancy try to get rid of Warren but are almost caught out by DS Gavin Armstrong (Andrew Hayden-Smith). Nancy shouts at Darren for being so stupid with the plan but in the process, accidentally runs over John Paul, making him blind. Nancy later reveals that her leg froze and she couldn't step on the brake, leaving her terrified. In September 2016, Nancy is interviewed over the murder of Patrick, but when she arrives at the school, her leg starts to spasm and she freezes, breaking down in tears, with Louis taking her to the hospital. Nancy along with the rest of the Osbornes flee the village after Jack gets a phone call saying someone is trying to kill him. The person turns out to be Jack's niece Eva Falco (Kerry Bennett) who is after Jack because Jack falsely imprisoned her dad. Nancy starts to feel unwell so Darren takes her to a hospital. The nurse sees a picture of them and calls Eva. When Eva arrives they disappear. On New Year's Eve they return to the village and Eva holds Nancy, Darren, Jack and Frankie at gun point. Esther, Kim and Grace run in the door and Eva accidentally shoots Esther but she survives.

In January 2017, doctors tell Nancy and Darren that she has multiple sclerosis, leaving the couple devastated. Nancy meets up with an old flame Kyle Kelly (Adam Rickitt) who also has MS. He asks Nancy to hide drugs for him and that they ease the pain of his MS. Nancy agrees but struggles to hide it from her family. When Oscar almost finds them she is horrified, so she takes them to Maxine and Adam Donovan's (Jimmy Essex) engagement party. Darren finds them and they agree to dispose of them. Nancy is emotional when she suffers a tremor and tells Darren that when the MS gets too much, she wants to end her life and she wants him to help her. Darren angrily shouts at her and they argue but they later make up. Darren starts dealing drugs to earn more money to pay for Nancy's treatment. Nancy decides to renew her wedding vows with Darren. Darren disappears after the ceremony and Tom tells Nancy about Darren dealing drugs. When Darren returns Nancy slaps him and confronts him about the drugs. Darren tells his family the truth and a furious Nancy kicks him out. Darren confesses to the police and they charge him. He returns home and Nancy tells him that their marriage is over. Nancy decides not to go to Darren's court hearing. She finds a letter that Darren gave to her and it says how sorry he is and how much he loves her. She runs to the court but Jack tells her it's too late and that Darren has been sentenced to 6 months in prison, devastating Nancy. She later visits him in prison and apologises and they reconcile. Nancy is delighted when Darren is released from prison a few weeks later. Nancy, along with the Osbornes attend Jade's memorial at Hollyoaks High, when and explosion caused by Mac Nightingale (David Easter) tears through the school. Jack helps Nancy out of the building but he is later injured when part of the roof collapses on him. Nancy is devastated when Frankie dies from a stroke.

Nancy is angry when Darren lies again after stealing from the loft. She suggests they should go to couple's therapy but Darren objects to the idea. At their friends, Mandy and Luke Morgan's (Gary Lucy), wedding, Nancy is furious when she discovers that Darren knew Luke was already married. She tells Darren their marriage is over and Darren sleeps with Mandy. The next day, Nancy tells Darren they should give their marriage another chance, unaware of his one night stand. Darren and Mandy start an affair behind Nancy and Luke's backs. Nancy and Darren go on a romantic getaway. On their return, Nancy confides in an uncomfortable Mandy that they didn't have sex once while they were there. Nancy asks Darren why is he keeping his distance, so Darren organises a romantic meal for Nancy. However, she suffers an MS attack, leading Darren to think he has been stood up. Nancy starts receiving letters from Becca's killer, Fran. Darren finds a letter and confronts Fran telling her to stay away but Nancy walks in. She tells Fran not to contact her again and leaves visibly distressed. Nancy is being watched by an unknown person who reveals herself to be Fran's daughter Brooke Hathaway (Tylan Grant). Brooke tells Nancy that she needs to forgive Fran because she is dying. Darren is against the idea but Nancy goes to see her anyway. Nancy confronts Fran and Fran apologises and explains that she was a bad person back then and reveals that Brooke is autistic. Later, Brooke asks Nancy if Becca would want her to forgive Fran and Nancy says she would just as Fran dies. Nancy is concerned over Brooke's welfare and decides to foster her but Darren doesn't agree. They are forced to tell Charlie what happened to Becca after Brooke tells him. Nancy and Darren argue and Darren decides they should split up. Darren meets up with Mandy and they decide to run away together just as Nancy suffers an MS attack and is rushed to hospital. Nancy reveals to Darren and Jack that she will be in a wheelchair for a while. Darren packs his bags and leaves a note for Nancy but after she breaks down in front of him, Darren decides to stay with her and breaks up with Mandy.

During an argument with Mandy, she reveals her affair with Darren. Nancy slaps Mandy and goes home to confront Darren. She arrives home but Brooke's social worker turns up unexpectedly. Nancy and Darren are officially aloud to foster Brooke and Nancy tells Darren that she knows about his affair. Darren begs for Nancy's forgiveness but she demands a divorce. Darren acts out a scene from Nancy's favourite book hoping to win her back and Nancy considers forgiving him. However, she walks in on him and Mandy kissing and enlists Sienna's help in ruining Darren's life. Darren and Mandy begin a proper relationship and Sienna and Kyle take Nancy out. Nancy kisses Kyle to make Darren jealous and he punches Kyle. Nancy calls the police and Darren is arrested but Sienna convinces her to change her statement. Nancy sabatages Luke's son, Oliver Morgan's (Aedan Duckworth), welfare meeting and when Mandy threatens to tell Sally St. Claire (Annie Wallace), Nancy fakes an MS attack. At the hospital, Nancy confesses to Charlie that she faked it. Darren later calls round and he and Nancy begin to have sex but he refrains and Nancy furiously admits that she faked the MS attack. Nancy tries to tell Mandy about her and Darren but she refuses to believe her and Mandy tells her that she's pregnant. Darren tries to get Nancy to leave but accidentally knocks her to the floor. Nancy refuses to let Darren see the kids and he later decides to apply for full custody, angering Nancy. Kyle gets James Nightingale (Gregory Finnegan) to help her win full custody. Kyle takes a picture of Darren gambling and shows it to Nancy. At the meeting, Nancy and Darren argue and she shows Mandy the picture. Nancy finds Mandy in the bathroom who tells Nancy she is bleeding. Nancy takes her to the hospital and after a heart to heart she agrees to stop her vendetta against Mandy and Darren.

When she discovered what Laurie did to his wife Sinead and rival Sienna, she supports them, where she forgives Sienna for everything she had done to her six years ago. Nancy is horrified to find that Finn has been released from prison. However, she decides to forgive him. With her, John-Paul, Sally and Edward help, they wanted him to be a good father to Bella causing Finn to leave the village, but allows him to return to village to visit anytime he wants. However, more tragedy occurs when her boyfriend Kyle commits suicide. Kyle's watch is later stolen, and Nancy discovers that John-Paul hasn stole it causing her angry and refuses to see him even though she drop the charges. However, she later forgives him upon learning that he was used by his cousin Theresa with the help of her boyfriend Seth and learns that Silas has returned.

When Charlie is arrested for the murder of Sid's cousin Jordan Price, she believes that he is innocent until she and Darren discover that it was Mandy's daughter Ella, who was in fact responsible for it. Despite their anger towards Mandy, they understand that she didn't want to lose Ella, due to bringing back memories of her late daughter Grace's death.

== Reception ==
For her portrayal of Nancy, Fox was nominated for "Best Newcomer" at the 2006 British Soap Awards. She received a nomination in the "Best Actress" category at the 2007 British Soap Awards. The following year, Fox was again nominated for the "Best Actress" award at the British SoapAwards. At the 2008 Inside Soap Awards Fox was nominated in the "Best Actress" category. Fox and Dawson earned a nomination for "Best On-screen Partnership" at the 2012 British Soap Awards. In August 2017, Fox was longlisted for Best Actress at the Inside Soap Awards. She did not progress to the viewer-voted shortlist. In 2025, Nancy and Darren received a "Best Soap Couple" nomination at the Digital Spy Reader Awards. Fox was also nominated in the "Soaps - Best Actor" category.

On Nancy's becoming pregnant, All About Soap's Claire Crick said that it was good news as "Our favourite soapy couple, Nancy and Darren, discover they're going to be parents [...] They might be poles apart in personalities, but it seems that when it comes to Mr and Mrs Osborne, opposites really do attract – and we couldn't love these two more. What with Darren's cheeky escapades and Nancy's no-messing attitude, they’ll make the perfect parents". She added that if Nancy is "as organised at being a mum as she is at being a journalist, then they will cope brilliantly! We're hoping the writers will leave them to be a happy for once and let Nancy have a stress-free pregnancy, but we don't fancy their chances". Crick's colleague Laura Morgan commented on Nancy going into premature labour saying "Our hearts were breaking for the couple as they faced the reality of their situation [...] we're keeping our fingers crossed there will be a happy ending to their nightmare". Morgan added that "Despite the sad nature of the storyline, it's been amazing (as always) to watch Jess Fox (aka Nancy) and Ashley Taylor Dawson (Darren) acting their socks off, and proving to us once again they're two of the best actors in soap right now".

The character of Nancy has been hailed for her involvement in the domestic abuse storyline from a charity called Tender. The charity aims to educate under-25s about violence in relationships. A survey conducted by the group found that 96% of participants thought the scenes were effective in bringing the issue to viewers' attention. They went onto say that "As a national platform, Hollyoaks played a vital role in educating the public about the issue of abusive relationships". Holy Soap said that Nancy's most memorable moment was "Ravi and Kris both begging her to choose them".
