= Saira Jackson =

British actress (born 1982)

- Born: Saira Choudhry; July 1982 (age 44); Cheetham Hill, Manchester, England
- Occupation: Actress
- Years active: 2008–present
- Spouse: Marcus Jackson (m. 2024)

Saira Jackson (née Choudhry) (born July 1982) is a British actress. She is best known for portraying Saira in Life, Naila in Coronation Street, Anita Roy in Hollyoaks, Tegan in Paul Abbott's No Offence, and Nisha Chandra in Waterloo Road.

== Early life ==
Saira Choudhry was born in Cheetham Hill, an inner-city area and electoral ward of Manchester, England. She was born to an Irish mother and an Indian father, the latter of whom died when Choudhry was ten years old.

== Career ==
Choudhry first came to prominence in 2008, when she joined the cast of Hollyoaks as Anita Roy, a part she played for 198 episodes, leaving the series in 2011.

After appearing in shows such as Coronation Street and Doctors, Choudhry starred as PC Tegan Thompson in Channel 4's comedy drama series No Offence from 2015 to 2018. On playing Tegan, Choudhry told the Manchester Evening News: "[Tegan]'s braver than me. She’s completely different to any character I’ve been known for before [...] It was nice to play such a strong female character and I think the way Paul has written her and the other women in the show is amazing. Women and men love to see that."

In 2020, Choudhry appeared as Saira Malik in the BBC drama series Life.

In 2022, Choudhry appeared as Alice in one episode of BBC comedy Peacock, alongside Allan Mustafa. Later in 2022, Choudhry starred as Nancy in the CBBC series Dodger, a reimagining of the Dickens’ character's life before Oliver Twist.

In February 2024, it was announced that Choudhry had been cast as maths teacher Nisha Chandra in Waterloo Road.

== Personal life ==
Choudhry's mother, Fae, is a no-smoking advisor. In 2010, Choudhry helped to launch that year's No Smoking drive.

In 2014, Choudhry set up her own drama school, TV Talent.

In December 2022, Choudhry announced her engagement to Marcus Jackson. In August 2024, Choudhry and Jackson married.

== Filmography ==
=== Television ===
Year	Title	Role	Notes
2008–2011	Hollyoaks	Anita Roy	198 episodes
2012	Crime Stories	Molly	1 episode Credited as Saira Choudry
2013, 2015, 2017–2019	Coronation Street	Naila Badal	7 episodes
2014	Doctors	Farah	Episode: "The Girl in the Photograph"
2014	The Driver	Tasha	1 episode
2015	Fungus the Bogeyman	Carly	Series 1 Episodes 1 & 2
2015–2018	No Offence	PC Tegan Thompson	21 episodes
2017	Porridge	Joanne	1 episode
2017	Cold Feet	Vedika Jawad	Series 7 Episodes 1 & 7
2020	Life	Saira Malik	6 episodes
2021	McDonald & Dodds	Alliyah	Episode: "The War of the Rose"
2022	Peacock	Alice	1 episode
2022	Dodger	Nancy	4 episodes, 1 episode uncredited
2024–present	Waterloo Road	Nisha Chandra	
2026	The Chelsea Detective	Clare Curtis	1 episode
