= Stephen Uppal =

English actor (b. 1978)

- Born: 1978 (age 47–48); Middlesbrough, England
- Occupation: Actor
- Years active: 2008–present

Stephen Uppal (born 1978) is an English actor of Indian descent from Ormesby in Middlesbrough. He is known for playing Ravi Roy in the long-running British soap Hollyoaks, Zaf in the 2009 film Freight, and also for playing characters in The History Boys at Wyndham's Theatre.

Uppal gained a qualification in English at the University of Teesside before winning a place at Arts Educational School where he performed many roles which included Arthur in Peggy Sue Got Married, Smike in Nicholas Nickleby and Neville in The Mystery of Edwin Drood.

== Filmography ==
=== Television ===
Year	Show	Episode(s)	Role
2008–2010	Hollyoaks	regular cast	Ravi Roy

=== Film ===
Year	Film	Role
2005	Red Mercury	Pamphleteer
2010	Freight	Zaf
2017	The Mummy	Ancient Egyptian
2019	Stalked	Cal
2019	Looted	Jamie – Police Officer
2021	Twist	Moody
2022	Kaur	Avani's father

=== Stage credits ===
- My Beautiful Laundrette (Salim), Duchess Theatre (Workshop)
- The History Boys (Cover Rudge/Timms), Wyndham's Theatre
- The History Boys (Cover Rudge/Timms), Royal National Theatre
- Tonight's the Night (Company), No 1 UK Tour
