= Mike Barnes (Hollyoaks) =

UK soap opera character, created 2006

- Hollyoaks character
- Portrayed by: Tony Hirst
- Duration: 2006–2010, 2016–2017
- First appearance: 30 January 2006
- Last appearance: 8 September 2017
- Introduced by: David Hanson (2006); Bryan Kirkwood (2016)
In-universe information
- Occupation: Student
- Wife: Kathy Barnes (until 2008)
- Daughters: Sarah Barnes; Amy Barnes
- Grandsons: Lucas Hay
- Granddaughters: Leah Barnes

Mike Barnes is a fictional character from the British Channel 4 soap opera Hollyoaks, played by Tony Hirst. He first appeared on 30 January 2006. In 2010, soap opera magazine Inside Soap reported that the character would leave in late January with love interest Zoe Carpenter (Zoë Lister). This was later confirmed. The character briefly returned in August 2016 and again in March 2017, where his youngest daughter Amy Barnes (Ashley Slanina-Davies) was killed off in a "whodunit" storyline. He returned again in September 2017 giving evidence against Ste Hay (Kieron Richardson) during Amy's murder trial.

== Development ==
In 2010, it was announced that Hirst had decided to leave the show. Speaking about his decision to quit to Digital Spy, Hirst said: "I've been there four years, I've had a great time, I love the place and I love the people dearly – but I need to freshen up. I need a new challenge, I need to play different characters, and it would be very easy for me to stay there for a long period of time and I don't think that would be any good to anybody. It also fitted in with the timing of the storyline of Sarah's death and Kathy being continually sectioned and Amy growing up. It would be difficult for them to shoehorn [any more] storylines in for Mike."

When asked whether his decision was based on lack of storylines, Hirst stated: "I'd be lying if that wasn't part of the reason but in fairness I always said to Bryan [Kirkwood] and to Lucy [Alan] that I'd rather have quality than quantity. I've been lucky to be involved in some really great storylines and I'm really grateful. That's always been the nature of the show and it's probably right for that. We can hold our heads up against any of the other soaps but what's the point in doing another adult-oriented show? One of its strengths is its youth and vitality. In terms of the adult storyline, I've always known the score really and I've always trusted Bryan and Lucy in their intent."

On 16 July 2016, it was announced that Hirst had reprised the role of Mike. He was seen on-set alongside Slanina-Davies and Duncan James who plays new character Ryan Knight.

== Storylines ==
Mike arrives in Hollyoaks with daughters Sarah (Loui Batley) and Amy (Ashley Slanina-Davies) and wife Kathy (Sarah Jane Buckley). A loyal and devoted husband and father, Mike's relaxed and easygoing attitude to life leads to his being a constant irritant to his wife Kathy, and early storylines involving the couple see Mike trying to calm Kathy down when she throws tantrums at him. Mike is oblivious to the fact that Kathy has slept with Sarah's boyfriend Rhys Ashworth (Andrew Moss). When he finds this out on Kathy's 40th birthday, Mike loses his temper and throws Kathy out; however he eventually forgives her and takes her back, after the two decide to reconcile for the sake of their daughters. Mike and Kathy's marriage remains turbulent. Mike and Sarah help Amy as she gives birth to Leah Barnes (Elà-May Demircan). Kathy decides to raise the baby as her own and claims she is the mother. Mike becomes overprotective towards Amy during her relationship with Josh Ashworth (Sonny Flood). After reading her diary, Mike assumes that Amy is sleeping with Josh. He then makes her begin to take contraceptive pills. Amy tries to tell him that she is not sleeping with Josh.

Mike refuses to believe Amy and stops her seeing Josh. This conflict continues and comes to a head when Mike chases after Josh in a violent rage and ends up suffering a serious head injury when a terrified Josh defends himself by hitting him over the head with a brick in self-defence. After he returns from hospital, Mike reveals in a chilling tone to Josh that he remembers everything and continues to harass and intimidate Josh, saying he will press charges if he doesn't break up with Amy. However, he ends up dropping the charges after Suzanne Ashworth (Suzanne Hall) threatens to tell everyone that Amy is Leah's mother. However the truth over Leah's maternity is announced in a local tabloid thanks to Michaela McQueen (Hollie-Jay Bowes).

Kathy becomes obsessed with Leah. Amy decides to be Leah's mother and raise her. Kathy kidnaps Leah, however is caught and is forced to stay with her mother in order to recover. Kathy then returns and Mike takes her back. Mike supports Sarah when she finds out her fiancé Craig Dean (Guy Burnet) is having an affair with John Paul McQueen (James Sutton). Amy's ex-boyfriend Ste Hay (Kieron Richardson) returns. Amy begins a relationship with him and claims he is Leah's father. Mike has no other option but to let Ste move in. Amy, Ste and Leah then move out due to Mike's interference. After talking to them, Amy tells Mike to leave. Sarah befriends fellow student Zoe Carpenter (Zoë Lister) and lets her move into the Barnes family home. Mike becomes a shoulder for her to cry on following her breakup with Darren Osborne (Ashley Taylor Dawson). Kathy becomes extremely jealous of Mike and Zoe and accuses them of cheating, throwing Zoe's clothes over the street. Kathy then begins a vendetta against the Ashworth family. After Kathy is found out, it proves the final straw for Mike, who, unable to cope with Kathy's behaviour anymore, tells her to leave, which she does. Shortly after this, Mike files for a divorce. Mike and Zoe then share a kiss and sleep together. The pair then begin a secret relationship. Ste enters the Barnes household to borrow a heater and he catches, and films, Mike and Zoe sleeping together. Ste reveals Mike and Zoe's relationship at Leah's first birthday party by sending the clip of the pair to Amy and Sarah. Sarah is horrified and tells Mike to choose between her and Zoe, who he then chooses. Zoe finds out she might be pregnant and tells Mike, however she is not. Mike begins studying at Hollyoaks College, he then resumes his relationship with Zoe.

After Ste begins abusing pregnant Amy, she eventually seeks Mike's help, despite the two of them having fallen out over her relationship with Ste. Mike ignores her at the door, as he does not realise she is actually trying to escape Ste, and so she returns to the abusive relationship. When the abuse comes out, an enraged Mike goes straight round to Ste's flat and beats him up. Michaela develops feelings for Mike during his and Zoe's relationship. Michaela tries to kiss Mike and claims to love him. Mike turns Michaela down gently and tells her that she is beautiful and will make someone a great girlfriend one day. Zoe and Mike's relationship eventually ends after Zoe's drunken night of passion with his daughter Sarah is revealed. Initially not wanting anything to do with either of them, Mike seems to forgive his former girlfriend before his daughter, even going so far as to briefly seek to rekindle their relationship. However, he eventually welcomes his daughter back into his life and does not restart his relationship with Zoe. Mike feels uncomfortable when Sarah becomes involved in a relationship with Lydia Hart (Lydia Kelly). Zoe steals a script belonging to Mike and uses it for her film project for college. The film is about Mike's decision whether to put a newborn Sarah up for adoption. Sarah feels she cannot forgive Mike after discovering this, however she eventually does. Mike goes to Zoe's lecturer Adrian Kennedy (Richard Lawrence) and informs him of her deceit, she then fails her course.

Michaela, her mother Myra (Nicole Barber-Lane) and sister Jacqui McQueen (Claire Cooper) temporarily move in to with Mike and Sarah after an infestation of rats in their house. Myra and Mike appear to become closer and she begins to have feelings for him. After Lucas' (William Hall) birth, Amy left to stay with her grandmother, leaving Ste to look after him. Abi (Elaine Glover) and Daniel Raven (Chris Hargreaves) befriend Ste but secretly plan to steal Lucas. Mike is suspicious over Abi and Daniel's interest. After finding Ste asleep while looking after Lucas, Mike takes him. Ste, Daniel and Abi approach Mike and confront him. Ste ends up taunting Mike about Kathy, Amy and Sarah. Angry, Mike punches Ste. The next day, Mike approaches Abi, who is looking after Lucas. Mike claims he deserves to look after Lucas, however Ste tells him he is seeing a solicitor to put an injunction against Mike.

In October 2009, Sarah dies after a parachute accident. Mike is informed by police and he collapses in grief. Mike and Zoe kiss and sleep together the next day however they both put it down to wanting some comfort. Zoe is questioned by the police as Lydia plants the knife used to sabotage the parachute under Zoe's bed, which leads to the police arresting her. Once he returns home, he informs Sarah's friend Hannah Ashworth (Emma Rigby) of her death. She collapses in grief. Archie Carpenter (Stephen Beard) visits Mike and tries to tell him Zoe is innocent, however Mike does not listen and throws him out. Mike visits Zoe in prison, and he finally realises she did not kill Sarah. During the trial, Mike reads Sarah's diary and starts to believe Sarah killed herself. Zoe is found not guilty, and released. Zoe moves into the Barnes home, and befriends Lydia in order for her to confess. However, Mike and Amy catch Lydia and Zoe kissing and he throws her out. Lydia discovers Zoe's true intentions for being her friend and takes revenge. She leads her to Sarah's grave to kill her and herself. Mike, Charlotte Lau (Amy Yamazaki) and Dave Colburn (Elliot James Langridge) rush to the cemetery after finding a suicide note. Lydia stabs Zoe but is stopped from killing her by Charlotte and Dave as Mike holds Zoe. Mike apologises to Zoe in hospital, where she recovers, and he is angry at Charlotte for keeping Lydia's secret. Zoe decides to leave Hollyoaks to go travelling. She hints to Mike to come with her. However, he refuses, claiming he cannot leave Amy and his grandchildren. After a heart-to-heart with Amy, she convinces him to go. Mike, Zoe and Gilly Roach (Anthony Quinlan) then leave.

In August 2016, Mike is seen visiting Amy and is furious when Amy and her fiancée Ryan Knight (Duncan James) decide to move to Hollyoaks village so that Leah and Lucas can be closer to Ste. In March 2017, Mike attends Ryan and Amy's wedding and argues with Ste over Amy's decision to move to America with Ryan, Leah and Lucas and tells him to leave. That evening, Mike and Ryan return home and find Amy's corpse in her flat after she was murdered by an unknown assailant, devastating Mike. He returns in September for Ste's trial of Amy's murder. After the trial, Ste is found not guilty, Mike's ex-wife Kathy Barnes is furious and she takes a handgun and shoots Ste. Mike grabs Kathy before police arrive and arrest her and take her to the police station. In May 2018, Ste calls Mike and explains to him what happened to Lucas and Leah, and he is upset when he finds out that Ryan killed Amy. He tells him Ryan had drowned in the river and has died.

== Reception ==
When Mike's relationship with Zoe began, there was some controversy over the storyline, due to the age gap between the pair. However, Hirst stated: "I think the controversy has subsided somewhat. It's not an illicit affair, it's known about now. It was shocking to some people at the beginning but it wasn't by any means illegal. There were some complications but they are both grown-ups!" Kris Green of Digital Spy called it one of the best stunts he had seen, noting that Mike's reaction to Sarah's death was particularly affecting and branding the episode "amazing."
