= List of Hollyoaks characters introduced in 2009 =

The following is a list of characters that first appeared on the Channel 4 soap opera Hollyoaks in 2009, by first appearance.

== Natty ==
Natty
- Hollyoaks character
- Portrayed by: Danny Tennant
- First appearance: Episode; 2 February 2009
- Last appearance: Episode; 17 November 2009
- Introduced by: Bryan Kirkwood
In-universe information
- Occupation: Charity worker (until 2009); Waiter (2009)

Natty, played by former Emmerdale actor Danny Tennant, made his first on-screen appearance on 2 February 2009.

Tennant originally auditioned for another role, but producers asked him to audition for the role of Natty in which he was successful.

On 31 March 2009, Natty invited his friend Daniel Raven to meet Ste. The two also became friends. In May, Natty revealed he had a son whom he gave up because he could not cope. Daniel, Natty and Abi Raven run a charity called 'Kidz with Kidz', they set it up for young teenagers who are struggling parenthood. Any parents that they feel are struggling, the charity will take the baby and give it to a better home. On 21 May, he comforted an upset Zoe Carpenter over her failed film project, they shared a kiss. In June, he got a job at the SU Bar they soon become a couple despite Abi and Daniel trying to sabotage their relationship. It appeared Natty is a victim of a previous scam set up by Daniel and Abi, in which he was also drugged and received crank calls until he snapped, resulting in losing custody of his child. When Abi and Daniel attempted to steal Lucas Hay, Natty helped Ste get him back. He was not seen again until October 2009, when he moved in briefly with Ste and started working at Relish. He has not been seen since.

== Persephone Hart ==
Persephone Hart
- Hollyoaks character
- Portrayed by: Elizabeth Hadley
- First appearance: Episode; 3 March 2009
- Last appearance: Episode; 8 May 2009
In-universe information
- Sisters: Lydia Hart

Persephone Hart, played by Elizabeth Hadley, is a girl who attended Steph Cunningham's Dance school. She first appeared on 3 March 2009. She bullied Tom and Holly Cunningham several times by ordering Tom around and making fun of Holly's dancing. She lied to her sister Lydia about Sarah Barnes hitting her when Sarah took her aside at the dance class and told her to try to get along with Holly and Tom. Lydia ordered Steph to fire Sarah or she would go to the police and Steph was given no choice but to fire her. Persephone was found out when Lydia wanted to ask Holly and Tom what had happened after Persephone lied that Sarah hit them as well. Persephone was forced to tell her she had made the whole thing up. Lydia then apologised to Sarah, spoke to Steph and got Sarah her job back. On 27 April 2009, Sarah bribed Holly to make friends with Persephone so she could spend time with Lydia, however Holly and Persephone only ended up arguing. On 8 May 2009, Persephone ruined Lydia and Sarah's meal together when she turned up at Sarah's and asked Lydia to look after her.

== Fernando Fernandez ==
Fernando Fernandez
- Hollyoaks character
- Portrayed by: Jeronimo Best
- Duration: 2009–2010
- First appearance: Episode; 23 March 2009
- Last appearance: Episode; 22 January 2010
- Introduced by: Bryan Kirkwood
- Spin-off appearances: Hollyoaks Later (2009)
In-universe information
- Occupation: Dance teacher

Fernando Fernandez, played by Jeronimo Best, first appeared on 23 March 2009 as a teacher of Steph Cunningham's (Carley Stenson) rival dance classes.

Casting auditions were held for the part of the Spanish character. Eventually after the initial stages actor Jeronimo Best was offered to portray the role. Best was chosen despite not being the same nationality as Fernando, with Best being of Mexican descent. Despite the character's occupation being a dance instructor, Best revealed that he was asked to improvise on set because he didn't know how to perform any of the routines the character specialises in.

=== Storylines ===
Fernando's first storyline was setting up a rival dance class against Steph Cunningham (Carley Stenson). Steph takes a liking to him, as does Cindy Cunningham (Stephanie Waring). Fernando reveals that he had recently broke up with his girlfriend, who resembles Zoe Carpenter (Zoë Lister) It is later revealed that in fact, she had died and he left Spain to clear his mind.

Fernando returns after a brief departure. Fernando and Steph go on a couple of dates, and he finds a love rival in Gilly Roach (Anthony Quinlan), who starts to develop feelings for Steph. Steph and Fernando eventually start a relationship. Gilly remains amicable with Steph and Fernando, despite his growing feelings for Steph. Steph's foster brother Barry "Newt" Newton (Nico Mirallegro) runs away from home, and with the stress of his disappearance, Steph forgets Fernando's birthday. After Gilly informs her of her mistake, he gives her some tickets to an outdoor pursuits week for her to offer Fernando. Fernando, Steph, Gilly, Zoe and Sarah Barnes (Loui Batley) go on the trip. Steph and Gilly nearly kiss but are caught in a trap by the group leader Kingsley (Daniel Goldenberg) and Fernando. Feeling angry, Gilly throws Fernando's bag into the lake, after Fernando reveals he is unable to swim. However, Steph's epilepsy tablets were in the bag, and subsequently she and Fernando have to abandon the trip and return home. Gilly also leaves. Steph overhears a poem Gilly wrote with racist undertones towards Fernando, she assumes Gilly's best friend Rhys Ashworth (Andrew Moss) wrote the poem and she tells Fernando, who finds Rhys and punches him. Fernando finds it hard to bond with Tom Cunningham (Ellis Hollins). However, they begin to get to know each other. After this, Fernando proposes marriage to Steph, which she accepts. However, when Steph starts to feel more for Gilly, she calls off their engagement and Fernando leaves.

=== Reception ===
Grace Dent of The Guardian joked about Steph failed engagement to Fernando stating: "With the best will in the world, I don't feel that marriage was ever going to last." She also poked fun at Fernando's reaction stating: "Fernando was heartbroken yet stoic, vowing to keep his head held high and cope with his loss through the power of dance."

== Daniel Raven ==
Daniel Raven
- Hollyoaks character
- Portrayed by: Chris Hargreaves
- First appearance: Episode; 31 March 2009
- Last appearance: Episode 2631; 24 August 2009
In-universe information
- Occupation: Charity worker
- Wife: Abi Raven
- Sons: Michael Raven

Daniel Raven, played by Chris Hargreaves, is the friend of Natty who he first introduced to Ste Hay.

On 3 April 2009, Daniel and his wife Abi were called by Ste when Amy Barnes went into labour. After the birth of Lucas Hay, Daniel and Abi visited the baby regularly and gave Ste advice on how to win over Mike Barnes. On 16 April, Ste revealed that Daniel and Abi would become Lucas's Godparents, however when they were on their own with Lucas, it appeared that they had bigger plans to be in Lucas's life. Daniel, Natty and Abi run a charity called 'Kidz with Kidz', they set it up for young teenagers who are struggling with being parents. Any parents that they feel are struggling, Daniel and the charity will take the baby away to give it to a better home. On 21 May, Abi told Daniel that she was keeping Lucas because his mother did not even want him.

In July, Natty became suspicious of Abi and Daniel. Daniel then taunted Natty and explained his plans. Natty then beat him up. With Natty out of the way, Daniel and Abi continued to drug Ste and were happy when, after an argument, Ste decided to stop Mike from seeing Lucas. Daniel then interviewed a couple to adopt Lucas, and after finding out Abi had slept with Ste, tried to convince Ste, who had shaken Lucas, to give him up. Ste agreed, however Abi took Lucas and phoned the police. Daniel was arrested and Abi gave Lucas back to Ste. Daniel was then released and told Ste, who planned to leave with Abi, that she was only interested in Lucas. Ste realised this and told Abi to leave. Daniel and Abi then admitted they still loved each other and left.

== Abi Raven ==
Abi Raven
- Hollyoaks character
- Portrayed by: Elaine Glover
- First appearance: Episode 2530; 3 April 2009
- Last appearance: Episode 2631; 24 August 2009
In-universe information
- Occupation: Nurse
- Husband: Daniel Raven
- Sons: Michael Raven

Abi Raven, played by Elaine Glover, is married to Ste Hay's friend Daniel Raven who first appeared on 3 April 2009 when Amy Barnes gave birth to Lucas Hay.

Abi is a nurse who arrived to deliver Lucas. On 6 April 2009, she revealed to Ste and Mike Barnes that Amy had left hospital during the night. On 13 April, Abi tried to convince Sarah Barnes to trust Ste and let him host a naming party for Lucas. On 17 April, at the naming party, Ste announced that Abi and Daniel would be Lucas's Godparents, however when they were on their own with Lucas, it appeared that they had bigger plans to be in his life.

On 19 May 2009, Abi revealed that her and Daniel had a baby together called Michael who died of SIDS and this was the reason for her, Daniel and Natty's care for Lucas. However even though Daniel planned to give Lucas away to better parents, Abi disagreed to the idea as he had promised her that she would have Lucas. In July, Ste moved in with Abi and Daniel, they then continued to drug him. Mike confronted Abi after an argument with Ste and questioned she and Daniel's interest in Ste and Lucas. After discovering Daniel had interviewed a couple to possibly adopt Lucas, Abi and Ste began to grow closer. Abi told Daniel she will leave him and take Lucas if he tried to give him up. Abi was comforted by Ste. Abi the leant in to kiss him, however he pulled away and left. Ste was scared Abi had told Daniel of their kiss and attempted to avoid them. Whilst on their own, Abi and Ste once again comforted each other and slept together.

After discovering Daniel had interviewed a couple to adopt Lucas, Abi told him she would leave him. Daniel caught Ste almost shaking Lucas and convinced him to give him to the parents. Abi took Lucas and phoned the police. Daniel was arrested and Abi gave Lucas back to Ste. Daniel was then released and told Ste, who planned to leave with Abi, that she was only interested in Lucas. Ste realised this and told Abi to leave. Abi and Daniel then admitted they still loved each other and left.

== Lucas Hay ==
Lucas Hay is the son of Ste Hay (Kieron Richardson) and Amy Barnes (Ashley Slanina-Davies), and the half-brother of Leah Barnes (Elà-May Demircan) and Hannah Hay-O'Connor. He was born on-screen in episode 2530, originally broadcast on 3 April 2009 and was delivered by Ste and his friend Daniel Raven's (Chris Hargreaves) wife, Abi Raven (Elaine Glover). His name was chosen by Ste. Lucas was played by a child actor, William Hall, from 2013 to 2022. In January 2023, it was announced that the character had been recast from William Hall, who had played Lucas for nine years, to Oscar Curtis, an older actor, for an issue-led storyline which would test Ste as a parent and see Lucas befriending some of the village's other teenage characters. Curtis made his debut as Lucas on 15 March 2023.

== Adrian Kennedy ==
Adrian Kennedy
- Hollyoaks character
- Portrayed by: Richard Lawrence
- First appearance: Episode 2566; 25 May 2009
- Last appearance: Episode 2591; 29 June 2009
In-universe information
- Occupation: Lecturer

Adrian P. Kennedy, played by Richard Lawrence, was Zoe Carpenter's film studies lecturer at Hollyoaks Community College.

Adrian first appeared when Zoe lost her film, which was needed to grade her college course, from her computer. He told her that she needed to hand it in and gave her an extension in order to complete a new one. However, Adrian was unaware that Zoe had in fact stolen a script from Mike Barnes and used it for her film. On 9 June 2009, Adrian played Zoe's film, which he passed, in the SU Bar. Zoe realised that Sarah Barnes was watching the film, which was about Mike's struggle with the birth of Sarah and his possibility to put her up for adoption. Sarah was very unhappy and thought Mike had told Zoe his past. Adrian made an indecent proposition to Zoe, telling her that he will forget her plagiarism if she slept with him. Zoe was horrified and left humiliated. On 18 June, Zoe went to see him, he assumed she was accepting his offer, however, she told him it was not worth it. He then failed her.

After finding out about the proposition Zoe's friends were disgusted and vowed revenge on him. However, at the Graduation ball, Zak Ramsey, Kris Fisher, Archie Carpenter and Rhys Ashworth followed Adrian into the staff toilets, wearing disguises, and soaked him with water and then threw faeces over him. Zoe was shocked but bemused and also humbled that her friends would do anything for her.

== Caleb Ramsey ==
Caleb Ramsey
- Hollyoaks character
- Portrayed by: Michael Ryan
- First appearance: Episode 2566; 25 May 2009
- Last appearance: Episode 2590; 26 June 2009
In-universe information
- Brothers: Zak Ramsey
- Sisters: Hayley Ramsey
- Nephews: Caleb Ramsey

Caleb Ramsey, played by Michael Ryan, is the brother of Zak and Hayley Ramsey. He first appeared on 25 May 2009. He left for Afghanistan on 26 June 2009.

Caleb is in the army and arrived with Hayley on 25 May 2009 in The Dog. Zak appeared to have a dislike of his brother's presence. Michaela McQueen was impressed with his fitness level and appeared to admire him. In June 2009, Zak returned from a weekend at army camp, where he claimed to have been working hard. Caleb started to get suspicious when Zak claimed to have fired a gun, Caleb then told Michaela that Zak was lying.

In mid June 2009, Caleb and Zak helped Ash Roy refurbish Relish, however, after Ash was rude to them, they quit. Ravi Roy convinced them, and Archie Carpenter, to return and promised them a bonus. On 18 June, after the completion of Relish, Ash, who was annoyed of his brother's popularity, told Caleb that Ravi might fancy him. Caleb, who did not know Ravi was bisexual, ran up and punched him. On 19 June, Ash found out what Caleb did and threatened him. Zak told Caleb that he was embarrassed and did not want to speak to him. Ravi went to the hospital after collapsing and was diagnosed with a brain aneurysm. In the SU Bar on 23 June, Caleb started an argument with Kris Fisher and Ravi. He took Kris by his T-shirt but Ravi pushed him off. Caleb told him to go outside so they could fight as Ash arrived. Ravi, knowing fighting could cause his aneurysm to kill him, refused and ran out. Ash told Ravi he was ashamed, as his brother had run out. On 24 June, Caleb told Zak that he had been called back to Afghanistan by the Army. Caleb revealed he was scared. He got drunk and approached Leila Roy and Elliot Bevan, where he asked Leila for a kiss. Elliot stood up for his girlfriend, holding Caleb back as he grabbed her. Ravi seen them, ran up and punched him. Ravi shouted to Caleb to stay away from his sister. The next day, he attended Zak's graduation. After, Caleb reluctantly returned to the Army in Afghanistan.

On 12 April 2010, Zak received a phone call from his mother to inform him that Caleb had died in Afghanistan on patrol. It was initially thought his death was an accident, but however his friend Tariq caused his death as while on patrol, Tariq tried to save a boy and regretfully told Caleb to drive their truck the opposite direction, leading Caleb to a roadside bomb, killing him.

== Christine Carpenter ==
Christine Carpenter
- Hollyoaks character
- Portrayed by: Race Davies
- First appearance: Episode 2590; 26 June 2009
- Last appearance: Episode; 30 November 2009
In-universe information
- Husband: Graham Carpenter
- Sons: Archie Carpenter
- Daughters: Zoe Carpenter

Christine Carpenter, played by Race Davies, is the mother of Zoe and Archie Carpenter. She first appeared on 26 June 2009 with her husband Graham for Zoe's graduation from college. Graham and Christine gave Zoe a necklace, unaware she had failed her degree. Adrian Kennedy, her lecturer, approached Zoe, Graham, Christine and Archie and told Zoe she should tell her parents. Graham and Christine were disappointed but forgave her.

Christine returned in October 2009 to visit Zoe in prison after she was charged with the murder of Sarah Barnes. She later appeared in November during Zoe's trial.

== Erin Fisher ==
Erin Fisher
- Hollyoaks character
- Portrayed by: Gemma Craven
- Duration: 2009–2010
- First appearance: Episode 2590; 26 June 2009
- Last appearance: Episode; 19 November 2010
- Introduced by: Lucy Allan (2009); Paul Marquess (2010)
- Spin-off appearances: Hollyoaks Later
In-universe information
- Husband: Eamon Fisher
- Sons: Malachy Fisher; Kris Fisher
- Daughters: Bernadette Fisher

Erin Fisher, played by Gemma Craven, is the mother of Malachy and Kris Fisher. Erin first appeared in Hollyoaks Later in 2008 at her husband Eamon's funeral and Malachy's wedding to Mercedes McQueen. She arrived in Hollyoaks on 26 June 2009 for Kris's graduation from college. Erin has a fear of flying and Kris was surprised she flew over. She looked down at Malachy's mother-in-law, Myra McQueen, by saying she must have been named after the murderer. After the graduation, Kris announced he would escort Erin back to Northern Ireland. Erin returns in November 2010 after Malachy's death, where she discovers Mercedes lied to Malachy about having HIV, which led to him hitting her. She then bans Mercedes from attending the funeral.

== Sheila Buxton ==
Sheila Buxton
- Hollyoaks character
- Portrayed by: Jessica Hall
- Duration: 2009–2010
- First appearance: 28 July 2009
- Last appearance: 5 March 2010
In-universe information
- Occupation: Manager

Sheila Buxton, played by Jessica Hall, is the manager of a call centre in Hollyoaks village. She first appeared on 28 July 2009. The Hollyoaks website stated on 14 August that Hall is "Hollyoaks' latest super-bitch".

Sheila first appears when Kris Fisher, Zak Ramsey, Sarah Barnes and Zoe Carpenter begin working at the local call centre. She promotes Kris and makes him fire Zak. Zoe is angry with Kris and makes him realise what he is truly like, he then stands down from the assistant manager's position. Sheila then takes the opportunity to get revenge on Kris for quitting by promoting Zoe. In October 2009, Sheila takes a liking to Elliot Bevan, whom she hires to work in the centre, and they soon sleep together, before beginning a relationship. When the call centre is closed down, Sheila is left devastated. Elliot ends his relationship with her due to viewing the relationship as a fling. However, they later make up. Elliot gets close to his ex-girlfriend Leila Roy, which makes Sheila jealous. She then ends her relationship with Elliot, realising he still has feelings for Leila. They later start their relationship once more.

== Gareth Bevan ==
Gareth Bevan
- Hollyoaks character
- Portrayed by: Phil Howe
- Duration: 2009
- First appearance: Episode 2621; 10 August 2009
- Last appearance: Episode 2625; 14 August 2009
In-universe information
- Occupation: Bakery owner
- Wife: Bonnie Bevan; Carly Bevan
- Sons: Elliot Bevan; Maynard Bevan

Gareth Bevan, played by Phil Howe, is the father of Elliot Bevan who arrived in Hollyoaks in August 2009. Gareth was mentioned in 2008 when Elliot planned to meet the man who had walked out on himself and his mother when he was young. It was announced that Elliot would be shocked when his father turns up and causes problems for him and girlfriend, Leila Roy. He also revealed that Elliot has a half-brother called Maynard.

Gareth first appeared on 10 August 2009. Leila contacted him, however Kris Fisher told her it was a bad idea. Leila then came up with a plan to get rid of Elliot before Gareth's arrival. Elliot answered the door to Gareth, who he assumed was delivering a picture to Leila. When Gareth and Elliot approached Leila, Elliot unwrapped a picture of him as a child and his mother, Elliot then discovered Gareth's true identity. Gareth told Elliot he had a 14-year-old brother named Maynard as they bonded. Leila discovered that Maynard was actually the same age as Elliot. Elliot's mother Bonnie arrived to confront Gareth on 14 August as revealed he had had an affair with a woman, who then produced Maynard.

== DS Murtaugh ==
DS Murtaugh
- Hollyoaks character
- Portrayed by: Ray MacAllan
- First appearance: Episode 2630; 21 August 2009
- Last appearance: Episode; 13 October 2009
In-universe information
- Occupation: Detective Superintendent

Detective Superintendent Murtaugh, played by Ray MacAllan, is a local police officer who first appeared in August 2009 when he arrested Daniel Raven on suspicion of kidnap, Daniel was later released. He later reappeared in September, where he questioned Ash Roy over the assault of Ravi Roy, which left him in a coma. He made another appearance in October, when he arrested and interviewed Jake Dean for breaking conditions of his bail by interacting with his son Charlie Dean.

== Des Townsend ==
Des Townsend
- Hollyoaks character
- Portrayed by: Kris Deedigan
- Duration: 2009–2010
- First appearance: Episode; 31 August 2009
- Last appearance: Episode; 6 August 2010
In-universe information
- Occupation: Teacher
- Sisters: Rose Townsend

Des Townsend, played by Kris Deedigan, first appeared on 31 August 2009 as a love interest for Jacqui McQueen.

He first appears in Hollyoaks village as a man who Ravi Roy spills coffee over. Des flirts with Loretta Jones after Jacqui McQueen throws his clothes out of Tan & Tumble. He later leaves his number for Jacqui, who agrees to go on a date with him. However, Jacqui has to leave early after being told of a sighting of Russ Owen and Max McQueen. Des begins his job as the head of sixth form at Hollyoaks High School. Carmel Valentine pretends to be her cousin Theresa, who had dropped out of school. Carmel believes Des has called the police on her after he discovers the truth, however he offers her the job as cheerleader coach. Des is teaching Anita Roy and Theresa when Anita begins to rebel as a result of discovering that she was adopted. Anita trashes the classroom as Theresa watches. Anita reveals how her father Govinda Roy, who was also the headteacher, covered up for her for stealing exam papers, ultimately destroying his career. Des has no choice but to report the situation to the governors, whilst Gov resigns. Des confiscates a pornographic magazine from Ricky Campbell and Duncan Button, when he finds pictures of Jacqui that were taken whilst she was drunk. Jacqui is horrified over the situation. However, Des tells her he does not care. Des and Jacqui begin to grow closer, and he helps her get a job as a dinner lady at the school. Jacqui is caught taking food from the canteen by Gaz Bennett and when Des finds out, he ends up getting her fired. Despite this, Jacqui and Des stay together.

Des shows his racist side as he begins to send death threats to Calvin Valentine. He befriends Zak Ramsey and tries to get him involved in his racist attacks. Des's hostility towards minorities increases when his older sister Rose, who raised him, visits and learns he wants to marry a woman who had a black half-sister. A disgusted Rose encourages him to believe Jacqui is attracted to Ravi Roy, and an insecure Des challenges to a boxing match outside Relish, and increasingly provokes him, leading Ravi to hit him in the face. Des continues his racism issues and sprays graffiti all over Ravi's restaurant in which his sister Anita accuses Gaz. Des sees Anita and Gaz arguing over the graffiti. Des advises Gaz to confront Anita as long as it is not on school grounds. Gaz is astonished of what he is being told but he does confront Anita anyway. Rose belittles Des for involving reckless people and warns him to take direction action or she will disown him. Meanwhile, Des tries to keep Zak, who now regrets his racist attitudes, on his side, telling him of revenge plans. Des tells Zak he will make trouble for Zak and his fiancée Michaela if Zak goes to the police, but Zak does anyway, warning them about Anita being in danger. The police arrest Gaz for holding Anita hostage as Des sets off a smoke bomb in Relish, briefly trapping Ravi inside before he is freed by Zak and Michaela.

Zak admits to Michaela that it was Des who attacked Relish and was trying to get him involved in his activities. The pair create a plan to prove Des is racist. Zak manages to film a conversation with Des, where he comes out with racist remarks such as lower standards of living due to immigrants. This video is on Michaela's laptop and she and Zak show the video to Jacqui. Des and Rose squabble about Jacqui, he then proposes to Jacqui in The Dog on the Pond, with Myra, Zak and Michaela as witnesses. Jacqui does not reply, and Des debates that because she did not say no, she loves him. Des and Jacqui have a drink at The Dog, and Jacqui pretends she does not know about Des's racist activities. He is overcome by guilt, admitting he attacked Ravi due to the colour of his skin. Jacqui asks him why he did it. Des tells Jacqui that his parents had died when he was young in a car accident, involving a Pakistani person. Jacqui tells him the accident could have still happened if it was a white person and that Tina was killed by a white person. Des claims Rose had made him believe racist things and that he hopes Jacqui could help him become a better person. Jacqui agrees to forgive Des, however when he proposes again, she slaps him. Des and Rose are told to leave as Jacqui refuses to return the engagement ring. Des and Rose exit The Dog in shame, but as soon as they do so, they are arrested by police, for attacking Relish.

== D.I. Fletcher ==
D.I. Fletcher
- Hollyoaks character
- Portrayed by: Laura Fletcher
- Duration: 2009–2010
- First appearance: Episode; 2 October 2009
- Last appearance: Episode; 1 January 2010
- Created by: Bryan Kirkwood
- Spin-off appearances: Hollyoaks Later
In-universe information
- Occupation: Detective inspector

Detective Inspector Fletcher, played by Laura Fletcher, is a local detective inspector at Dee Valley Police Station. She first appeared during Hollyoaks Later, where she investigated the death of Sarah Barnes in a skydiving accident. She questioned Lydia Hart and Zoe Carpenter, who she then arrested for Sarah's murder. She later reappeared in the main show when Zoe's brother Archie protested his sister's innocence and again in January 2010, after Lydia was revealed as Sarah's murderer.

== Rae Wilson ==
Rae Wilson, played by Alice Barlow, made her first appearance on 5 October 2009. She was introduced as a new love interest for established character Barry Newton (Nico Mirallegro). Rae departed in September 2011 after being murdered by serial killer Silas Blissett (Jeff Rawle).

== Kathleen McQueen ==
Kathleen McQueen, played by Alison Burrows, made her first appearance in Hollyoaks spin-off Hollyoaks Later in September 2009 as the mother of already-established character Theresa McQueen (Jorgie Porter). After her initial appearance, Burrows reprised the role of Kathleen on the main Hollyoaks show, before making her final appearance in February 2010. In October 2010, it was announced that Kathleen would be reintroduced in December 2010, in a storyline which features her blackmailing her family after discovering one of the McQueens' "darkest secrets".

== Other characters ==
Character	Date(s)	Actor	Circumstances
Ricky 20	22 June – 16 September 2009	Sam Attwater	The person Ricky Campbell (Ashley Margolis) posed as, using his pictures and claimed to be 20. Anita Roy (Saira Choudhry), who was using Theresa McQueen's (Jorgie Porter) picture, imagined meeting him while she was Theresa. However waiting for him on their date, Anita was worried that Ricky could be lying, in fact he was and was not 20 but 14. The real Ricky ran into Theresa, who he thought was who he had been talking to on-line, and caught her kissing Barry "Newt" Newton (Nico Mirallegro).
Young Mike	9 June 2009	James Hedley	A younger version of Mike Barnes (Tony Hirst) who appeared in Zoe Carpenter's (Zoë Lister) film, the script of which had been stolen from Mike and was a story of Mike's decision 20 years ago on whether to put Sarah Barnes (Loui Batley) up for adoption.
Rob Mackie	15–19 June 2009	Johnathon Wright	A record label manager that Josh Ashworth (Sonny Flood) picked up from the airport and came to watch "The Somethings" play and possibly to sign a record deal with. However he was not very impressed with lead singer Hayley Ramsey's (Kelly-Marie Stewart) disability.
The Dean	16 June 2009	Malcolm Tomlinson	A college head who Hayley Ramsey (Kelly-Marie Stewart) and Rhys Ashworth (Andrew Moss) tried to get sponsorship from for their band "The Somethings". However, he refused. Prior to his appearance, The Dean had been referenced to several times by characters in years before he appeared.
Edward Selznick	17 June 2009	Leigh Symonds	A record collector who bought Rhys Ashworth's (Andrew Moss) records from Josh Ashworth (Sonny Flood) to fund his band "The Somethings".
Wade	29 June–22 July 2009	Misha Crosby	Wade first appeared during Lauren Valentine (Dominique Jackson), Barry "Newt" Newton (Nico Mirallegro), Theresa McQueen (Jorgie Porter), Anita Roy (Saira Choudhry) and Ricky Campbell's (Ashley Margolis) camping trip. The group take a dislike to Wade, except Lauren, who used him to make Newt jealous.
Stav McHale	2 July 2009	Jamie Duffield	Stav McHale was a member of a band who played at the SU Bar. He got on well with Hannah Ashworth (Emma Rigby), who left with him and his band for Denmark. Darren Osborne (Ashley Taylor Dawson) accidentally soaked Stav's trousers whilst he was going to play a final song so the pair swapped trousers and Stav told him to wait in his band's minibus. The band, and Hannah, then left for Denmark as a half-naked Darren sat in the back.
Timothy Helpman	3–9 July 2009	Damien Lyne	Warren Fox's (Jamie Lomas) solicitor who informed his foster brother Spencer Gray (Darren John Langford) that Warren had left him The Loft, Evissa and his flat in his will.
John and Sandy Bentley	11 August 2009	Mark Hesketh and Cloudia Swann	A couple who arrived for an interview with Daniel Raven (Chris Hargreaves) about possibly adopting Lucas Hay (Jude Hawley).
Opponent	3 September 2009	Andy Merchant	A man who Ravi Roy (Stephen Uppal) illegally fought.
Mr Hobbs	4 September 2009	Archie Lal	The doctor who told the Roy family that Ravi Roy (Stephen Uppal) needed a craniotomy after his aneurysm caused him to fall into a coma.
D.I. Stanley	15–16 September 2009	Kelly De Jong	A detective inspector who questioned Barry "Newt" Newton (Nico Mirallegro), Lauren Valentine (Dominique Jackson) and Anita Roy (Saira Choudhry) over the vicious assault of Gaz Bennett (Joel Goonan).
Dr. Morland	16 September 2009	Peter Rylands	A fertility specialist who Mercedes (Jennifer Metcalfe) and Malachy Fisher (Glen Wallace) had an appointment with about sperm cleaning.
Richard Kirk	16 September 2009	Jack Lond	A psychologist who analysed schizophrenic Barry "Newt" Newton (Nico Mirallegro).
Ged Paxton	22–25 September 2009	Charlie Wade	A friend of Archie Carpenter (Stephen Beard) who pretended to be an old acquaintance of Warren Fox (Jamie Lomas) to steal money from Elliot Bevan (Garnon Davies) and Zak Ramsey (Kent Riley). After Archie realised Ged had planned to steal the money for himself, Ged held him hostage on the college roof, threatening to throw him off unless he got the money.
Inspector Robinson	5 October 2009	Stephen Chapman	A police inspector who questioned Elliot Bevan (Garnon Davies) over his assault on a police officer.
Dr. Saunders	5–6 October 2009	Andrew Dickens	A doctor who assessed Jake Dean (Kevin Sacre) and told him he believes he is well enough to be released.
Lily Wilson	5 October-22 December 2009	Meryl Hampton	A lady who Barry "Newt" Newton (Nico Mirallegro) mugs for money when he was on the run. Newt returned her handbag to her and informed her that her granddaughter Rae Wilson (Alice Barlow) was dead. However, this proved false when Rae appeared. Rae agreed to relocate with her boyfriend Newt, his mother and baby brother to Scotland. However Lily suffered a stroke on Rae's 18th birthday despite Rae from surviving from what she believes is a strange family curse. Rae decided not to go with him and his family so she decides to stay for a while longer to look after Lily instead.
Paul	23 October 2009	Simon Paris	A priest who talked to Zoe Carpenter (Zoë Lister) over her false imprisonment.
Sinclair	16–17 November 2009	Jordan Murphy	A student at Abbey Hill school. He was a friend of Rae Wilson (Alice Barlow), who moved to Hollyoaks High School after the schools were merged. During this, Sinclair made an enemy of Gaz Bennett (Joel Goonan) and Barry "Newt" Newton (Nico Mirallegro).
Chantelle	16 November 2009	Uncredited	A young woman who works in Evissa.
Judge	30 November–3 December 2009	Judy Holt	The judge at Zoe Carpenter's (Zoë Lister) trial.
Michael Patten	30 November–3 December 2009	Kevin Harvey	Appeared at Zoe Carpenter's (Zoë Lister) court case, in which he defended her.
James Westbrook	30 November–3 December 2009	Nicolas Chagrin	The opposer of Zoe Carpenter (Zoë Lister) who appeared at her court case.
Forensic expert	1 December 2009	Tom Lloyd Roberts	A forensic expert who appeared during Zoe Carpenter's (Zoë Lister) trail, where he showed the jury the knife used to cut the parachute of deceased Sarah Barnes (Loui Batley).
