= Amy Barnes =

Fictional character from Hollyoaks

- Hollyoaks character
- Portrayed by: Ashley Slanina-Davies
- Duration: 2006–2014, 2016–2017
- First appearance: 2 January 2006
- Last appearance: 10 October 2017
- Introduced by: David Hanson (2006); Bryan Kirkwood (2013, 2014, 2016)
In-universe information
- Other names: Amy Knight
- Occupation: Student (2005–2014); Teaching assistant (2011); Waitress (2011–2012); Coffee shop assistant (2016–2017)
- Father: Mike Barnes
- Mother: Kathy Barnes
- Sisters: Sarah Barnes
- Husband: Ryan Knight (2017)
- Sons: Lucas Hay
- Daughters: Leah Barnes
- Grandsons: James

Amy Barnes is a fictional character from the Channel 4 soap opera Hollyoaks, played by Ashley Slanina-Davies. She debuted on-screen during the episode airing on 2 January 2006. Amy was created by executive producer David Hanson and Slanina-Davies was offered the role whilst looking for work as an extra. In 2009, Slanina-Davies stated that she would be lost without the role and confirmed her loyalty to the serial. In July 2010, it was announced that Slanina-Davies would be leaving the show. However, it was later revealed that she was back filming and staying in the serial in 2011. Amy's storylines have included underage pregnancy which resulted in the birth of daughter Leah Barnes and the subject of domestic abuse in her relationship with Ste Hay, portrayed by Kieron Richardson. Whilst filming the storyline, Slanina-Davies cut her long hair off for charity and this was scripted into the storyline.

Amy has also been part of a storyline which saw her pretending her daughter was suffering from leukaemia to scam money out of the community; off-screen, this prompted Slanina-Davies to campaign for leukaemia and cancer charity CLIC Sargent and Women's Aid. The issue of post-natal depression has been portrayed, following the birth of her second child Lucas Hay. Slanina-Davies has also revealed that she has conducted extensive research into all of her issue-lead storylines. In 2012, it was announced that Slanina-Davies would be written out of the serial. Amy departed on 8 August 2012. Amy returned for guest appearances throughout 2013, 2014 and 2016, before returning to the show on a permanent basis in August 2016.

In January 2017, it was revealed that Amy would be departing later in the year in a "whodunit" storyline which would see the character killed off after being murdered. She made her final appearance as a corpse on 29 March 2017, however continued to appear in flashback appearances throughout the storyline. Amy's funeral was held on 25 April 2017, with characters such as her mother, Kathy (Sarah Jane Buckley), and Zoe Carpenter (Zoë Lister), returning for her funeral. On 4 September 2017, Ste's fiancé, Harry Thompson (Parry Glasspool), was named as the culprit who killed Amy. However, on 8 September 2017, it was revealed that Amy was still alive after Harry left, meaning he was not responsible. Amy appeared again for a final time in a flashback episode which aired on 10 October 2017, where her new husband Ryan Knight (Duncan James) strangled her, revealing him as her killer.

== Casting ==
In 2005 executive producer David Hanson created the Barnes family which included Amy. Actress Ashley Slanina-Davies was looking for work as an extra at the time, but her audition secured her the regular role of Amy. She made her first appearance in January 2006. In 2009 Slanina-Davies admitted she was committed to the soap, stating she "would be at a loss" without the role. In 2010, it was announced that Slanina-Davies would leave later in the year. This was confirmed at the same time as Garnon Davies (Elliot Bevan), Glen Wallace (Malachy Fisher) and John Pickard (Dominic Reilly) announced their departures. A spokesperson for Hollyoaks stated: "We're all sad to be losing yet more friends from the cast [...] Nothing's been firmed up yet storyline-wise but one thing's for sure, they'll all be memorable exits." In late 2010 it was revealed that Davies was still filming with Hollyoaks and would remain on the soap in 2011.

== Character development ==
=== Characterisation ===
Ah, the much-maligned, long-suffering Amy Barnes! When will she get a break?! [...] She's seen some dramas - and then some! Mum to Leah and Lucas, she gave birth to both of them on the kitchen floor and suffered in an abusive relationship with Lucas' dad Ste. Her mum went mad and her sister Sarah was killed in a tragic skydiving incident (yes, you did read that right) - and let's not forget how she and the kids almost died in the Il Gnosh fire...

— A writer from E4.com describes Amy's tenure. (2012).

BBC America have branded Amy as the "Bad Seed" of the Barnes sisters. They also add: "She's not mean-spirited, but she's known for trouble-making." In her later years she transformed into a single and more confident woman. She is described on the show's official website as not "afraid to stick up for herself".

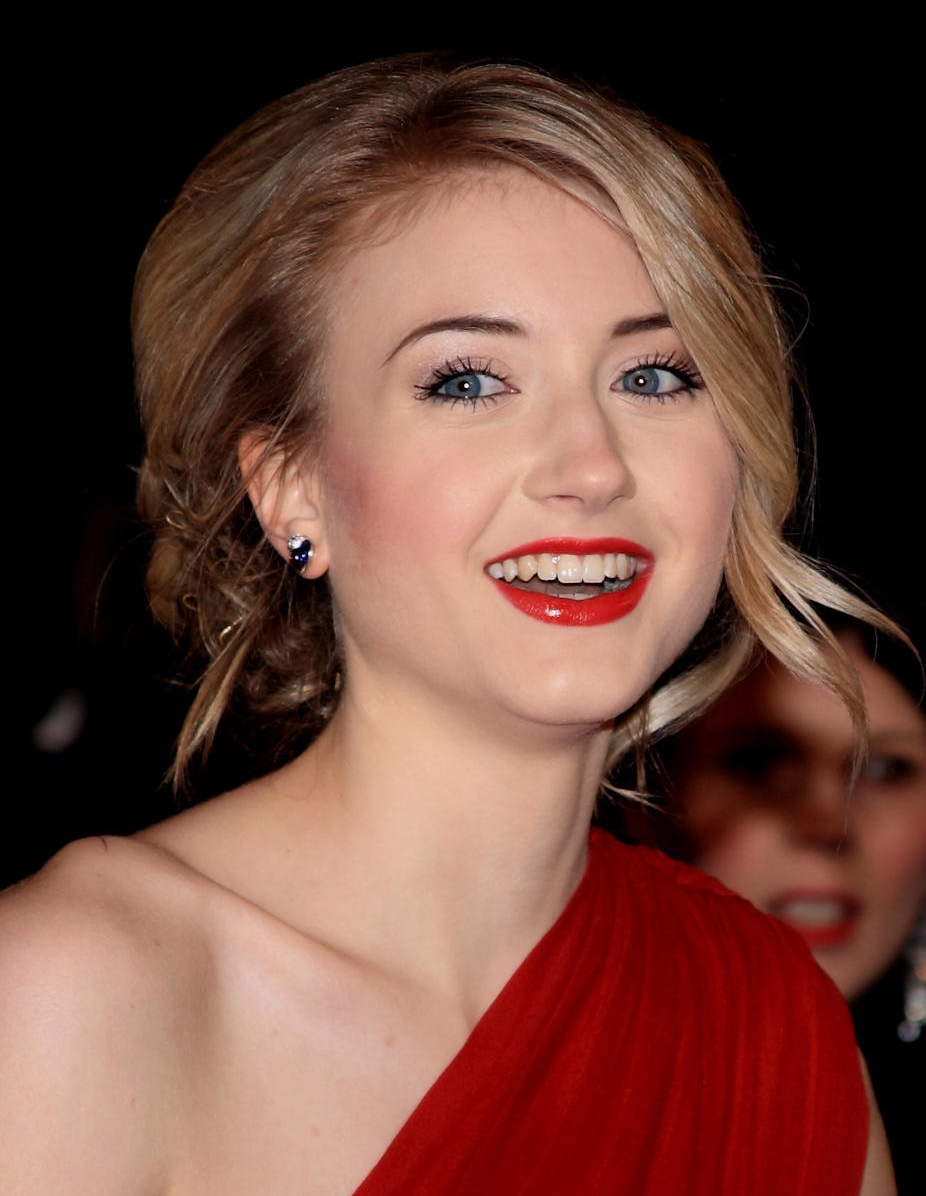
Ashley Slanina-Davies (pictured) cut her hair short for Amy's domestic abuse storyline.

=== Relationship with Ste Hay ===
In 2007 after Amy resumes her relationship with Ste Hay (Kieron Richardson) and they move into their own flat, Ste became increasingly violent and started to hit Amy, which was the start of a domestic abuse storyline. Slanina-Davies conducted extensive research into the plot During an interview with LINC Online she stated: "I research pretty much everything I’m involved in. It's important to be realistic because there’ll be people out there watching who are hoping to relate to your character. I think if you didn’t research properly you’d only end up alienating the people you want to try and empathise with." One segment of the storyline saw Ste cutting off her ponytail. In real life Slanina-Davies had cut her hair short to raise money for charity of this she stated: "When I had my hair cut short in Hollyoaks I did that to raise money for CLIC Sargent, which is a charity helping children with cancer and leukaemia."

At this time, Amy fell pregnant, but was unsure whether to keep the baby. Slanina-Davies stated that she loved portraying pregnancy in the serial and commented on Amy's dilemma of abortion stating: "I have absolutely no opinion on whether Amy should keep her baby, because I think it's a woman's right to choose." Speaking about 2008 as a whole for Ste and Amy, producer Bryan Kirkwood stated: "I'm really proud of the way Kieron Richardson has portrayed Ste, dare I say sympathetically, so we can understand but not condone his behaviour. He and Ashley [Slanina Davies] are delivering brilliant performances as two young kids portray the reality of so many 16- and 17-year-olds as they struggle to make a life for themselves and repeat the mistakes of their parents. It's a very real situation and some of their scenes still to come are downright shocking. It's set to become a very big story as the year progresses." Ste later takes a violent outburst to far and a spokesperson for the serial described it as "the final straw" for Amy. She is later shown leaving Ste after finally realising she needs to accept help from those closest to her. Slanina-Davies and Richardson then fronted a charity campaign called "Expect Respect" in order to combat domestic violence. At the time Slanina-Davies released a statement reading: "Domestic abuse takes many forms, it can be physical, sexual or mental. In Hollyoaks, my character Amy faced this in her relationship with Ste and I know from this storyline why it can be difficult to leave an abusive relationship."

=== Il Gnosh fire ===
In 2010 Amy was involved in a special week of episodes, battling to save her two children Leah Barnes (Jessica Croft-Lane) and Lucas Hay (Jude Hawley) in the blaze. In early 2011 Marquess revealed that Amy would be staying in the show permanently and be involved in a serious storyline in which Leanne Holiday (Jessica Forrest) would do some "terrible things" to Amy. Executive producer Gareth Phillips later revealed that there was never any plans for Amy to leave. They filmed alternative endings to confuse viewers and added they had been "mischievous" in doing so. He said it made the serial more exciting and that they had many storylines for Amy and Lee because they "make a great pairing".

=== Departure and returns ===
Amy was written out of the series in 2012. Series producer Emma Smithwick told Digital Spy's Kilkelly that Amy often did not "care for herself and her own wellbeing" because she was too busy helping Ste and her children. Smithwick and her colleagues had wondered what would happen if Amy was no longer in the show. They wanted to explore Ste's character without having the stability that Amy provides him. But Smithwick noted that she "loves" Amy and the decision was just "dictated by story". The storyline played out when Amy "goes on a wild night out", gets drunk and kisses Ste. Richardson told a writer from Inside Soap that "when Ste comes to her rescue, Amy's emotions are all over the place after splitting up with Ally. So after Ste shows her a little kindness, she gets the wrong idea and goes in for a snog." Amy is "mortified" by her actions and has to rethink her life in Hollyoaks. She decides to move away to study taking Leah and Lucas with her. Richardson explained that his character has done everything for his family and to not have Amy and the children in his life is a "massive thing to get used to." Amy made her final on-screen appearance during the episode broadcast on 8 August 2012.

Amy returned in February 2013 for two episodes and the scenes will feature Ste, Brendan, Leah and Lucas. Slanina-Davies filmed the scenes in December 2012. In October 2014, Digital Spy's Sophie Dainty announced that Amy would feature in episodes airing later that month. Further storyline developments were announced seeing Ste's abusive stepfather Terry Hay (Conor Ryan) befriending Amy. In April 2016 it was announced that Slanina-Davies had reprised her role for a guest appearance. The character returns to Hollyoaks as part of Ste's topical storyline focusing on homelessness.

The following month it was announced that Slanina-Davies had agreed to return to the show on a permanent basis. Duncan James was cast to play Amy's new love interest Ryan Knight. Writer planned to pitch Ryan, a "professional, stable and aspirational" man against Amy's ex-partner Ste. Of her return the actress stated "I couldn't be more excited to bring Amy back to Hollyoaks [...] I think Amy might find herself stuck between a rock and a hard place with those two!"

=== Death ===
In January 2017, it was announced that the show planned to kill Amy off. Kilkelly from Digital Spy reported that Amy's partner Ryan would return home and find her dead in a "devastating" and "dark" storyline. He added that the storyline would create dramatic scenes involving Amy's relatives. Slanina-Davies made her final appearance as Amy on 29 March 2017, where her body was discovered by Ryan and her father Mike Barnes (Tony Hirst).

== Storylines ==
Amy first appears being dragged to her sister Sarah Barnes' (Loui Batley) swimming training, where she is bored and jealous of Sarah's success. Amy befriends Michaela McQueen (Hollie-Jay Bowes), Jamie "Fletch" Fletcher (Sam Darbyshire) and Josh Ashworth (Sonny Flood) and begins a relationship with Ste Hay (Kieron Richardson). Ste manipulates Amy into sleeping with him, resulting in their eventual break-up. On her 15th birthday, Amy meets a boy called Billy, who she has a one-night stand. Michaela supports Amy upon Amy discovering her pregnancy. Amy and Ste reunite and he takes her joyriding, which leads to a crash, culminating in Ste fleeing and Amy is partially injured. Amy dumps Ste to date Josh despite her father Mike Barnes (Tony Hirst) disapproving of them. They decide to flee Hollyoaks together however, after weeks, the couple decide to return home. Josh attacks Mike with a house brick, which ends Josh's relationship with Amy. She develops labour and delivers her daughter, Leah Barnes (Ela-May Demircan) on her kitchen floor, to the surprise of Sarah and Mike. Amy's mother Kathy Barnes (Sarah Jane Buckley) decides to raise Leah as her own child, ashamed of her daughter's underage pregnancy. However, Amy grows close to Leah and decides she wants to be her mother. Kathy kidnaps Leah and is eventually sectioned.

Ste cuts off Amy's hair as part of their domestic violence storyline (2008)

Ste returns to Hollyoaks following a stint in a young offenders' institute. Mike is angry, but Amy lies that he is Leah's father and they eventually move into their own flat. Ste begins to steal to help fund the family, but begins lying that Leah has leukaemia for money. An angry Amy decides to leave Ste, but agrees to continue lying until they have enough money to support them. After the secret is revealed, Ste ultimately assaults Amy and she is rejected by her family. Ste's violent outbursts continue, with him cutting off her long ponytail on an occasion. After Amy is threatened by Ste again, she lies that she is pregnant. After admitting her lie, he apologises, seeing what he has caused. Soon after, Amy unearths her actual pregnancy and dumps Ste once again after he attacks her.

Ste begins anger management and Amy gives birth to Lucas Hay (William Hall). She resumes her previous relationship with Josh, later becoming engaged. However, she suffers from post-natal depression and leaves to stay with her grandmother for several months, whilst there she ends her relationship with Josh once more, eventually returning at Sarah's funeral. Ste tries to help Amy with the depression and she eventually warms to her children again. Amy and Ste become friends and she moves back in with him to be a proper mother to Leah and Lucas. Amy initially believes that Zoe Carpenter (Zoë Lister) has murdered her sister Sarah, along with Lydia Hart's (Lydia Kelly) help she tries to expose her. Zoe later exposes Lydia as Sarah's killer and she reconciles with Zoe. She begins life as a student and starts dating Olly Larkin (Oliver Watton), who tries to force her into having sex until Ste saves her.

Amy becomes friends with fellow students Jem Costello (Helen Russell-Clarke) and Lee Hunter (Alex Carter). Lee and Amy begin having feelings for each other, despite his fiancée Leanne Holiday (Jessica Forrest). Leanne's jealousy continues until Lee eventually admits his feelings for Amy and they decide to be together. Amy discovers Ste and Brendan Brady's (Emmett J. Scanlan) relationship and is angry when she realises Brendan is abusing Ste. Brendan threatens Amy numerous times for her to keep her mouth shut. Gabby Sharpe (Phina Oruche) asks Amy to babysit for her, a fire is started in Il Gnosh downstairs by Dominic Reilly (John Pickard). Amy, Leah and Lucas are trapped upstairs, Amy almost dies until she is saved by Steph Roach (Carley Stenson), who later dies in the fire. Amy recovers in hospital and tells Ste she thinks Brendan caused the fire. Ste doesn't believe Brendan started it at first, but he then hears a voice mail from Amy saying she's scared because Brendan threatened her, which was on the night the fire started, Brendan then threatened Amy once again in hospital. Frightened, Amy tells Lee she is being transferred to a hospital in Manchester to be near Mike and they share an emotional goodbye. Lee later finds a letter from Amy explaining that they cannot be together, unaware that it was actually Leanne who wrote it.

Amy ruins Lee and Leanne's wedding when she learns Leanne forged the letter. Amy discovers that Rae Wilson (Alice Barlow) is pregnant with Ste's child. Amy convinces Brendan to end his affair with Ste. Amy tells Bombhead (Lee Otway) that her near death in the fire and losing Lee took a burden on her life. She got a job as a teaching assistant at Hollyoaks High School, and befriends Pete Hamill (Peter Mitchell). Amy, Leah, Lucas and Lee successfully audition for a sausage advert campaign. She clashes with Leanne, when she leaves her Leanne twists her ankle. Amy is arrested after Leanne claims Amy assaulted her. The police decide to take the complaint no further.

Leanne starts vandalising Amy's sausage posters placed around the village. Leanne follows Amy and Lee to the filming of a new advert. She attempts to ruin the set by pushing Lee down a ski slope and later climbs into bed with him. Leanne tries to convince Ste that Amy is mentally ill like Kathy. After an argument with Amy, Leanne is found injured at the bottom of the SU bar stairs. She accuses Amy of assault and she is charged. Ruby Button (Anna Shaffer) then bullies and taunts Amy in the classroom. Amy then cries due to being bullied by Ruby, forcing Pete to make Amy take leave. Amy is faced with a prison sentence and repeatedly argues with Leanne in public. She later breaks down and ends her relationship with Lee over trust issues. Leanne drops the charges and Amy reconciles with Lee. He buys Amy a new car and Dodger Savage (Danny Mac) agrees to give her driving lessons. She soon finds herself attracted to Dodger. She drunkenly has sex with Dodger, but insists it is a one-night stand. She reconciles with Lee, he later finds out she slept with Dodger. They break up after Lee broadcasts details of their personal life over student radio. Amy realises Lee loves her and proposes to him.

Lee gets a job offer in New York and Amy decides to go with him, taking her kids with her. Ste says no, making Lee quit his job in New York. Amy then has a go at Ste, saying everything she has ever wanted has been ruined by him. Amy then tells Lee to go to New York because it's his dream, but decides not to go with him, staying in Chester. A couple of days later, serial killer Silas Blissett (Jeff Rawle) puts a pawn chess piece into her flat and becomes one of his targets, making Lynsey Nolan (Karen Hassan) guess who his next victim will be however it is later revealed did not intend to kill Amy. Amy takes waitress job at "College Coffee". She begins a relationship with Ally Gorman (Dan O'Connor). They argue when she kisses Dodger but he forgives her. She then suspects him visiting lapdancing clubs, but he claims it is to protect the girls from danger. Ally kisses Ash Kane (Holly Weston) and they separate. Amy gets drunk and tries to kiss Ste. He tells her that they spend too much time together. She decides to leave with Lucas and Leah to study in Manchester.

Amy returns when Kevin Foster (Elliot Balchin) tells her that Ste is back together with Brendan. She argues with Ste and he becomes violent grabbing her arm. Amy takes Leah and Lucas home with her not wanting Brendan around them. When Brendan is arrested she returns to visit Ste. She later lets Ste look after his children more often but bans him when he becomes addicted to drugs. In 2014, Amy returns and lets Ste see his kids. When she finds out Ste is with drugs, she bans him. Amy and Mike return to the village in search of Ste. Amy leaves when she discovers Ste has had a drugs relapse.

In August 2016, Ste goes to Amy's home and punches Ryan Knight (Duncan James) when he sees him playing with Leah, not realising he is Amy's fiancée. Following this, Amy returns to live in the village with Ryan, Leah and Lucas, engaging in a custody battle with Ste and his boyfriend Harry Thompson (Parry Glasspool). Due to Ste's past convictions and addictions, Amy and Ryan are granted full custody, with Ste only being allowed visits supervised by Amy or Ryan. Following an argument on New Year's Eve 2016, Ryan has sex with Mercedes McQueen (Jennifer Metcalfe), which is filmed by Mercedes' cousin Goldie McQueen (Chelsee Healey). Ryan immediately regrets it and is desperate to keep it from Amy. At their engagement party, Harry inadvertently gives Goldie's mobile phone to Amy, and she shows the footage of Ryan and Mercedes kissing to everybody. Amy dumps Ryan and he leaves for Canada. Ryan returns weeks later and begs for a second chance. Ste persuades Amy to reconcile with Ryan and she comes around. Ryan and Amy are married in a beautiful ceremony. Ryan then asks Amy to move to America with him with Leah and Lucas, which she is reluctant to do at first because of Ste. However, an argument between Ste and Harry at the wedding reception leads to Amy's dress getting ruined, she agrees to leave for America with Ryan and the children. Leah and Lucas accidentally reveal this to Ste, who organises a quick custody hearing, where Ryan and Amy are granted to move to America with the children, devastating Ste.

Amy is murdered by an unknown assailant on her wedding night. Mike and Ryan had returned home to find Amy lying lifeless on the floor. The whole village is shocked and saddened to hear the news of her death. Ste is immediately arrested and charged with the murder. Ste suffered a blackout at that night so he cannot defend his whereabouts. There are six suspects in the frame: Ste, Harry, Ryan, Mercedes, James Nightingale (Gregory Finnegan) and DS Gavin Armstrong (Andrew Hayden-Smith). Ste is the prime suspect because of Amy taking Leah and Lucas away from him. Harry's motive is that he would do anything for Ste. It does not seem at first that Ryan has a motive, but later on it is revealed Ryan had cheated on Amy that night with a man named Kyle Kelly (Adam Rickitt). Mercedes and Amy had embarked on a feud following Mercedes' one-night stand with Ryan. James did not know Amy very well, but he hates Ste for ruining his relationship with John Paul McQueen (James Sutton) and it is possible he wanted to frame Ste for the murder as revenge. DS Armstrong had stalked several attractive young women with blonde hair and it is revealed Amy was one of them.

During Ste's trial, he discovers Harry accidentally murdered Amy during an altercation when Harry tried to stop her from taking the kids to America. In an 8 September 2017 flashback, Harry argues with Amy and she falls and hits her head. Harry flees the scene without calling for help. However, it is revealed in another flashback that Amy was actually still alive after Harry left and another person had killed her. In October 2017, it is revealed that Ryan killed Amy. As seen in a flashback, Ryan arrived home and Amy furiously confronted him about cheating on her with a man. Amy tells Ryan he left his mobile phone on and she received a voicemail where she heard him confess. Amy was devastated that Ryan cheated on her on their own wedding day and expressed disbelief that she fell in love with another gay man. Amy threatened to tell the whole village that Ryan was gay and so he suffocated her.

Two years later, Ste, who joins the members of Far Right Radicalisation, regrets listening to Jonny Baxter (Ray Quinn) and Stuart Sumner (Chris Simmons). Remembering that Amy told him not to make any mistakes, Ste turns against them upon learning their true actions was. After Stuart's death, Ste mention to Jonny how Amy changed his life, despite his abuse of her.

== Reception ==
Amy was nominated for "Best Couple" for her relationship with Josh, at the 2007 Inside Soap Awards. Soap opera reporting website Holy Soap have described Amy stating: "Amy seemed like the nice girl but was the first to go off the rails after her parents' break-up." They recall Amy's most memorable moment as being: "A drunk and angry Ste lashed out at Amy and she became a battered spouse." Cancer charity CLIC Sargent have branded Amy a "troubled teenager". In 2008 the British Government produced a report detailing how soap operas help educate children about sex. They used Amy as an example and said she could help parents talk about the realities of having a child at a young age. Tess Larnacraft from TV Buzz said that the publication's staff could not feel sorry for Amy when she sleeps with Dodger. She also opined that Amy would be better off having a relationship with Dodger, instead of Lee. Daniel Kilkelly from Digital Spy branded Amy a "fan favourite".
