= Lydia Hart =

Fictional character from Hollyoaks

- Hollyoaks character
- Portrayed by: Lydia Kelly
- Duration: 2009–2010
- First appearance: 4 March 2009
- Last appearance: 1 January 2010
- Introduced by: Bryan Kirkwood
- Spin-off appearances: Hollyoaks Later (2009)
In-universe information
- Occupation: Student
- Sisters: Persephone Hart

Lydia Hart is a fictional character from the British Channel 4 soap opera Hollyoaks, played by Lydia Kelly. Lydia was created by series producer Bryan Kirkwood as one of many characters introduced that year. She made her debut in the soap on 4 March 2009, and remained for ten months.

Lydia's storylines focus on homosexuality, obsessiveness and murder. The seemingly level-headed music lover and friend of Josh Ashworth (Sonny Flood), she is portrayed as opinionated, passionate young student who had a love of music and protecting her family, including her young sister Persephone Hart (Elizabeth Hadley) who also appeared in the show for a period of three months. Lydia's relationship to the sexually confused Sarah Barnes (Loui Batley) was central to the character for the seven months leading up to her screen death in October 2009 after she was murdered by Lydia. Other storylines included her ongoing on-off relationship with ex-girlfriend Charlotte Lau (Amy Yamazaki) and continued feuds with Archie (Stephen Beard) and Zoe Carpenter (Zoë Lister). The character's departure was announced in December 2009, resulting in the character being charged for the murder of Sarah and the attempted murder of Zoe, with Lydia making her final appearance on 1 January 2010. The parachute stunt won a British Soap Award in 2010, but the aftermath storyline has received mixed reviews from critics. Some have favoured Lydia's "bunny boiling" whilst others described it as a "drawn out and boring storyline."

== Character creation and casting ==
In November 2008, during an episode of Hollyoaks spin-off Hollyoaks Later, Sarah Barnes (Loui Batley) and Zoe Carpenter (Zoë Lister) had a sexual encounter. Up to now both characters had previously been portrayed as heterosexual and this was the start of Sarah's on-going sexuality crisis. The character of Lydia Hart was created as the new love interest for the sexually confused already established character, Sarah. When the character first appeared on-screen she was revealed to have a younger sister, Persephone Hart (Elizabeth Hadley), who was attending the dance classes taught by Sarah. Little is known about the rest of Lydia's family, although the character did stay with her mother frequently off-screen. The character was also given links to Charlotte Lau (Amy Yamazaki) who arrived in Hollyoaks in June 2009. It was soon revealed that Lydia was Charlotte's ex-girlfriend.

It was announced in February 2009 that Hollyoaks series producer Bryan Kirkwood had cast television newcomer Lydia Kelly in the role of Lydia. Speaking to the Hollyoaks website of her casting, Kelly stated, "It was brilliant, when my agent said I'd got the part I didn't believe her." In Hollyoaks Backstage, when Kelly was asked what was next for Lydia, she stated, "[...] I don't know whats next for Lydia [...] I think justice has to be done soon." In December 2009, it was announced that Kelly would leave the show. Producers confirmed that Lydia would depart at the climax of her storyline.

== Character development ==
=== Characterisation ===
Lydia first arriving on-screen was first shown as different from other characters and it was stated from her inception that she was passionate about music and enjoyed getting people into the music scene. Speaking of her character, Kelly stated "She's very down to earth. She knows exactly what she wants, where she wants to go, and how to get there! She's also very level-headed." From the characters inception, she was shown to be an opinionated, proud young student who wasn't afraid of her homosexuality and a person who could make friends very easily, as well as enemies.

Lydia's relationships helped develop the character. Her first relationship off-screen is with ex-girlfriend Charlotte, who supposedly shared her interests in music and fashion, as they were both considered 'out there'. The history of the relationship immediately gave viewers an insight to the character. However, their relationship was seemingly shattered by Lydia's constant jealousy and her clingy nature, which ultimately led to their break up. Lydia tried to commit suicide soon after, which was told on-screen when Charlotte arrived in the village. Lydia's second relationship was a more serious one, with the sexually confused Sarah Barnes. Sarah, who had previously been portrayed as heterosexual, suffers an identity crisis, coming to terms with her one-night stand with Zoe Carpenter; however Sarah ended the relationship after Lydia became interfering and tried to control her life due to falling in love with her. Speaking to entertainment website Digital Spy about Sarah's relationship with Lydia, Loui Batley commented, "With Lydia, she brought something to her and she got on with her and was sparky, which is something that Sarah liked." After her relationship with Sarah ended, the character's true persona was revealed. She became jealous of Sarah and her relationship with Zoe, and the character's vulnerability became the centre of her deranged campaign for revenge in the latter part of 2009, as she was excluded from Sarah's life.

=== Murder and exit ===
In July 2009, it was announced by Hollyoaks that Loui Batley had quit her role as Sarah and Zoe Lister (Zoe) would depart the soap later in the year and that one of the girls' exits would result in a "tragic curtain call". It was announced that Lydia would be the cause of the pair's departure. In later September, Lydia became very jealous of Sarah, who she had recently split up with. She also became jealous of Zoe, who Sarah had a one-night stand with in the previous year. During the events of Hollyoaks Later in October, Lydia's jealousy went out of control when she sabotaged a parachute, which was revealed to be used by either Sarah or Zoe. It was announced that one of the pair would be killed after plummeting to their death.

Hysterical Lydia, who thought Sarah and Zoe were having an affair, had a conversation with Charlotte where she revealed attempting suicide after splitting up with her, proving the character's vulnerability. After sabotaging Zoe's parachute, they are mixed up and a terrified Lydia began to worry that she might have got the sabotaged parachute. While doing the jump, Zoe's deploys, however Sarah's does not. As Sarah hits the ground, Lydia screams in terror. She is completely destroyed by Sarah's death, but does not admit to being responsible when Zoe is arrested, after which Lydia tries to commit suicide once again.

After Zoe is released from prison and is found not guilty of Sarah's murder, it is believed that Sarah committed suicide after her diary, found by Mike Barnes (Tony Hirst), is used as evidence in court. Soon Lydia starts to befriend Zoe and she ends up moving in with the Barnes family, and Zoe plans to uncover Lydia's murderous ways as she does not want to be known as a killer. In an interview with entertainment website Digital Spy, Lister said of the storyline, "It all gets really messy from here! Because Lydia's really deranged, Lydia starts thinking that because she loved Sarah and Sarah loved Zoe, if she gets with Zoe, that'll be the final piece in the puzzle and it'll all work out." She explained: "Lydia starts becoming obsessed with Zoe and to keep control, Zoe has to go with it. There's a point where Lydia kisses her! And then Mike walks in and kicks Zoe out."

The culmination of the plot saw Lydia lure Zoe to a church and stab her at Sarah's grave. This led to a fight between Lydia and Charlotte who arrives with Dave Colburn (Elliot James Langridge). They both fight to grab the knife while an unconscious Zoe bleeds, ultimately leading to the arrest of Lydia when the police arrive. She is later charged with the murder of Sarah and the attempted murder of Zoe.

== Storylines ==
Lydia first appears in March 2009 as a friend of Josh Ashworth (Sonny Flood). She orders Steph Cunningham (Carley Stenson) to fire Sarah after her sister Persephone Hart tells her that Sarah hit her. Theresa McQueen (Jorgie Porter) steals Lydia's handbag and she accuses Josh's girlfriend Amy Barnes (Ashley Slanina-Davies). She decides not to press charges against Theresa. Amy accuses Lydia and Josh of having an affair. Josh tells her she is a lesbian and Amy hits her. Amy later apologises, however is still jealous of Lydia and Josh's relationship. At Josh's birthday party, Michaela McQueen (Hollie-Jay Bowes) assumes that Lydia and Sarah are a couple. Sarah and Lydia then become friends. In late March, after agreeing to dance with Sarah during one of the classes, Lydia kisses her. Sarah denies it when Lydia claims that they felt something. Sarah then shows more of an interest in Lydia.

Lydia finds out Sarah is bribing Holly Cunningham (Lydia Waters) to befriend Persephone so she could get closer to her, leaving things awkward between the girls. The next day, Lydia allays her fears to Sarah over relationships and the girls seal it with a kiss, which Michaela sees. Sarah and Lydia then begin a full relationship. It is revealed that out of her family, Persephone is the only one who knows of Lydia's sexuality. Lydia replaces Rhys Ashworth (Andrew Moss) as the drummer of Josh's band 'The Somethings' as he kicked him out because he was against having wheelchair user Hayley Ramsey (Kelly Marie Stewart) as the lead singer because of their bad breakup. Lydia is later kicked out of the band due to unreliability.

After breaking up with Sarah, Lydia becomes jealous of Zoe and Sarah's friendship. Lydia then begins going out with Sarah again although she is more invested in the relationship with Sarah. Lydia's true colours start to show when she tells Sarah she has received dead flowers on her and former girlfriend Charlotte's anniversary, she tells Sarah she thinks they are from Charlotte, she then shows the same bouquet to Charlotte and accuses Zoe. It is then revealed during an argument with Charlotte that Lydia tried to kill herself when she and Charlotte split up. Lydia sees Sarah and Zoe going on an adventure holiday with Steph Cunningham (Carley Stenson), Fernando Fernandez (Jeronimo Best) and Gilly Roach (Anthony Quinlan) and is jealous when she takes Zoe. Lydia follows them and has an argument with Sarah. She continues to pretend Charlotte is stalking her in order to gain sympathy. When left alone with Zoe, she tells her Sarah tried to kill herself over her. Later, Lydia overhears Sarah admit her love to a drunken Zoe. The next day, Lydia begins slitting her wrists and tries to convince Sarah that Zoe is trying to split them up. Lydia uses a knife on one of the parachutes which Zoe will use, however they get mixed up. As the girls head into the sky, Lydia begins to feel guilty and tries to stop them, however Zoe and Sarah jump out. Lydia follows and is horrified when Zoe's parachute deploys and Sarah's does not. Sarah then hits the ground. Lydia and Zoe rush to her body, both crying. Lydia frames Zoe for the death of Sarah by hiding the knife used to sabotage the parachute behind Zoe's bed. Lydia then proceeds to slit her wrists in the shower due to her guilt.

As Lydia recovers in hospital, Zoe is charged with Sarah's murder. Realising she has escaped arrest for accidentally killing Sarah, Lydia lies to Charlotte, telling her how she and Sarah planned to travel and even adopt. Archie Carpenter (Stephen Beard) confronts Lydia over the day of Sarah's death and is shocked when Lydia claims she was not supposed to die. Archie goes to the police, however they do not do anything. During Sarah's funeral, Archie arrives at her wake and announces Lydia caused her death. When no one believes him, he is removed. Before Zoe's court case, Mike goes to visit her. Lydia tries to tell Mike that she will try to appear innocent. When he returns, and claims he knows she could not have killed Sarah, Lydia manipulates him into believing that she was just trying to get him on side. At this time, Charlotte and Lydia get back together. At the court case, Lydia lies whilst giving a statement. Charlotte accompanies Lydia to the case, agreeing to keep their new relationship quiet. However, when she sees the knife used to cut the parachute, Charlotte realises Lydia was responsible for Sarah's death. After she confesses, Lydia tells Charlotte if she goes to prison, she will kill herself.

Zoe is found not guilty of Sarah's murder, due to the court believing Sarah committed suicide. After Lydia catches Mike kissing Zoe, she goes to Amy and tells her what she saw, and tells her she believes Zoe is trying to get Mike on her side to make it look like she is innocent. Lydia expresses her doubts with Mike, still trying to blame Zoe for Sarah's death. However, after realising she could try to get Zoe on her side, she pleads with her to forgive her and move into the Barnes family home. An angry Zoe throws her out. Zoe then approaches Lydia and apologises. The pair slowly become friends. However, Zoe is only pretending in order to get a confession. Lydia and Zoe kiss as part of Zoe's plan to expose Lydia as Sarah's killer. Mike throws Zoe out of the flat.

On New Year's Eve, Lydia discovers Zoe's true reasons for befriending her and decides to murder her at Sarah's grave, before taking her own life. Zoe and Lydia meet in a church to admit their 'relationship' to Sarah. However, Zoe flees and is knocked unconscious. When she wakes up, she finally gets a confession from Lydia, who admits why she cut the parachute. Zoe attacks Lydia before leaving. At Sarah's grave, Lydia stabs Zoe, as Charlotte, Mike, and Dave arrive to stop her. As Zoe is taken away in an ambulance, Lydia is arrested. Lydia is questioned by D.I. Fletcher (Laura Fletcher) as Zoe recovers in hospital. Lydia admits everything and she is then charged for the murder of Sarah and attempted murder of Zoe. She is later given a lifetime prison sentence.

== Reception ==
Ruth Deller of entertainment website Lowculture criticised Lydia, during her monthly review on the popularity of soap opera characters; she branded her as an unconvincing villain, stating: ‘Looking like a demented shrew doesn't mean you're convincing at being a crazed murderess. The whole 'who killed Sarah' storyline is rather silly, and it's not helped by Lydia being a rubbish villain. Memo to Hollyoaks: must try harder.’

The parachute stunt won ‘Spectacular Scene Of The Year’ at the 2010 British Soap Awards. Olly Richards, writing for men's lifestyle magazine FHM, commented on the aftermath of Sarah's death and Lydia's storyline by branding it as a ‘really drawn out and really boring plotline.’ Radio Times included Lydia on their list of top bunny-boilers, due to her attitude towards Sarah and killing her out of jealousy. They ironically joked about how long she could repress her murderous impulses, giving her until the new year (the actual time until she tried to kill Zoe).
