= Zoe Carpenter =

Fictional character from Hollyoaks

- Hollyoaks character
- Portrayed by: Zoë Lister
- Duration: 2006–2010, 2017, 2025
- First appearance: 1 September 2006
- Last appearance: 14 October 2025
- Introduced by: Bryan Kirkwood (2006, 2017); Hannah Cheers (2025)
- Spin-off appearances: Hollyoaks Later (2008–2009)
In-universe information
- Occupation: Unemployed
- Father: Graham Carpenter
- Mother: Christine Carpenter
- Brothers: Archie Carpenter

Zoe Carpenter is a fictional character from the British Channel 4 soap opera Hollyoaks, played by Zoë Lister. The character first appeared on-screen on 1 September 2006, as one of three new students at Hollyoaks Community College. It was announced in 2009 that Lister had quit her role in order to pursue other projects; she subsequently left the series in January 2010. During Zoe's time in Hollyoaks she has been portrayed as a bubbly tomboy who often makes the wrong choices in life and has had a number of failed relationships. In March 2017, it was reported that Lister would be reprising the role for Amy Barnes' (Ashley Slanina-Davies) funeral. Her return aired on 24 April 2017. In September 2025, it was announced that Lister would reprise the role again.

Zoe has been involved in storylines including being stalked, entering a relationship with an older man, having sexual relations with her female best friend, being wrongfully imprisoned for the murder of Sarah Barnes (Loui Batley) and being the victim of a stabbing. Lister's portrayal saw her nominated for the "Sexiest Female" award at the 2008 British Soap Awards, and also attracted critical praise for her exit storyline.

== Development ==
=== Casting ===
Actress and dancer Zoë Lister was cast in the role of Zoe. On 8 June 2009, media entertainment website Digital Spy revealed that Lister had quit the soap and would leave towards the end of the year. Speaking of her decision to quit, Lister stated: "It's scary but also very, very exciting. I think three years in a soap is enough to do and you get to a point where you either make a decision that this is what you do or you want to try something different." She also revealed that she had been planning to leave the series one year prior to announcement. Lister's decision to quit matched that of co-star Loui Batley (Sarah Barnes). Hollyoaks officially announced on 23 July 2009 that both Lister and Batley would leave towards the end of the year in a storyline that would see "A tragic curtain call for one of them", later revealing that either Sarah or Zoe would be killed off in a dramatic storyline. Lister also revealed in an interview with Heat magazine that she was "nervous", but "very excited" about leaving the show.

Almost a year after filming her final scenes, Lister explained that she felt her exit was the right choice, saying: "It felt it was time to go so I just ran with my instincts. Looking back, I was nervous but now I know I've done the right thing. I love theatre work. It gives me such a buzz. [Hollyoaks] was the break I'd been praying for. I threw myself into the part and enjoyed every minute of it. I had three superb years and it was brilliant."

=== Characterisation ===
Zoe is a former student at Hollyoaks Community College, where she studied Film Studies. Channel 4 publicity describe Zoe as "the bubbly student" and make note of her many bad choices in life and failed relationships. Discussing these failed relationships, Lister commented during an interview in June 2009 that she believed her character was having a break from men in order to sort out her problems: "I think she's been in and out of so many relationships and her life is at a bit of a juncture; she probably needs to sort her head out, sort her career, knuckle down really and not get bogged down into a relationship because everything takes a backseat when you're in one."

Zoe is also portrayed as having a tomboy persona. Lister was asked about this "tomboy" personality during an interview with Maxim magazine, agreeing with the label and stating her character doesn't "glam up" as much as the other Hollyoaks characters. Maxim also noted the character was "pretty popular with the boys". Lister has also commented that her character is not a stereotypical dizzy blonde, reiterated her character's tomboy status and added that she is a "very street-smart type of woman."

=== Early storylines ===
One of Zoe's first and main storylines was being stalked by fellow student Will Hackett (Oliver Farnworth). Lister later commented on the storyline, deciding it was her most memorable: "The most memorable for me was the one with my weird boyfriend Will who stalked me. Like I said, it was a bit weird, but I quite liked it as a storyline." During a fire safety promotion undertaken with co-star Lena Kaur, who plays Leila Roy, Lister referenced the storyline, commenting: "It's much easier to test your smoke alarm once a week and plan your escape from fire than it is to escape from a psycho!".

In early 2008 during an interview with Digital Spy, Lister expressed her feelings on the subject of lesbian storylines, stating: "I'd definitely do a lesbian love scene in Hollyoaks. That would be a really good story." It was later confirmed by Channel 4 that Lister's character would be involved in a sexual relationship with Sarah during the new late night series Hollyoaks Later. After the screening of the scenes, Lister explained: "It was quite nerve-wracking actually as I'm good friends with Loui — it's quite a strange thing to smooch a really good friend so we had to get over the giggles and think 'right, just do it!'" Also commenting on her worries about the scenes, she said: "I thought it was hilarious! I thought it'd be interesting, though. I was obviously quite worried about them. Loui [Batley] and I chatted a lot when we found out that it was going to be in the late-night eps and we were wondering 'oh no, what does this mean?!' But in the end, they weren't graphic or anything like that, so it was fine." She continued: "It was completely mental filming them. Loui and I just had a massive attack of the giggles. I think the crew were more embarrassed than we were! We were kind of ignored for the day."

Speaking to entertainment news website Digital Spy about Sarah and Zoe's relationship, Lister explained: "I don't think they do have feelings for each other in that way. Last year happened and Zoe put it down to history and experience — one of those things that teenagers get up to occasionally and she was quite happy to leave it there. They've got through a lot and their relationship is really quite special. There's a lot of love there but Zoe's not got anything sexual for Sarah — it's purely a deep friendship." Meanwhile, Batley said: "I think that for Sarah, Zoe's the best friend she's ever had — a lot of people in her life have let her down but Zoe's her rock. Even though they've had their fall-outs, she's always been there for her and she loves her as a friend. I think Zoe feels the same. But for Sarah it's something more — she completely relies on her and that turns into love for her as well."

=== Imprisonment and exit ===
"It wasn't difficult in a lot of ways because if you've done a good three years in a soap it's just your time. It wasn't something I really struggled with. I knew a year ago that this was probably going to be my last year (playing Zoe). I wasn't desperate to leave because it's awful or anything, because I've had such an amazing time and met amazing people and got an amazing start to my career. I was keen to see what else can be done. I'd really like to do some theatre next but you really can't plan it. "

— Lister on her decision to put her character to rest. (2009)

After the announcement of Lister's departure, it was that revealed Loui Batley, who played Sarah Barnes, would also leave the show in a tragic skydiving death, caused by a jealous Lydia Hart (Lydia Kelly). Before the skydiving plot aired, Lister explained the storyline during an interview with Sky TV, stating that at the time Lydia severed a parachute to end her own life, later deciding to cut Zoe's parachute so she could have Sarah to herself, further explaining that viewers were not permitted to know who would have parachute after they became mixed up in the storyline's dramatic twist. Speaking on how Zoe's relationship with Sarah causes Lydia to commit her actions, Lister stated:

Zoe's not always been a great friend, for example this year she plagiarised Sarah's dad's script to use as her degree project and that revealed a lot about Sarah's history and her life. It's not been great but there's a lot of love there between them. Zoe's not a lesbian, it was a bit of an experimental phase, but Sarah will always hang on to that. So when Lydia turns up, Sarah obviously has a bit of thing for Zoe and Lydia just can't take it and starts going mental.

Lister explained that she and her fellow cast members filmed on many locations, including army barracks. They filmed at Tatenhill Airfield, where staff had been told to remain secretive about the storyline. She also revealed that she was the only cast member out of her, Batley and Kelly who performed the aired skydiving for real. A Hollyoaks producer released two pictures of funeral wreaths, one reading 'Zoe' and the other 'Sarah', in order to confuse viewers further as to whom the victim would be. On-screen after the skydive and Sarah's subsequent death, Lydia framed Zoe for the murder she committed, leading to her arrest.

Speaking of Sarah's death and Zoe's false imprisonment, Lister stated: "She's in a very difficult place. She's lost her best friend and there's so much history there and she's finished her degree — well she didn't even finish her degree, she failed that — so she's in a limbo land anyway. She's working silly jobs and she's not in a very good place at all in any aspect of her life. Oh, and she's in prison on suspicion of murder..." When asked during another interview with Digital Spy about how the character is coping with being in prison, Lister stated: "Not very well! It's all completely overwhelming for her. She can't get her head around the fact that her best friend's dead and the fact that she's being accused of murdering her is ridiculous. She's worried that because it's got this far its ludicrous, so who's to say that she won't be sent down?"

When the character was ultimately found not guilty and was released, Lister stated in an interview with E4: "I think this is a great storyline, I've really enjoyed doing it. When Zoe's obviously released, it's like a whole new scenario for her because there are people who haven't really trusted her or believed in her. People that have really let her down, and plus the fact she hasn't got over Sarah [...] being killed yet either. She hasn't had the chance to deal with that, so that's really interesting, and she still wants Lydia to go down!" The character of Zoe then set out to expose Lydia as Sarah's killer. She befriended her, and even seduced her in order to gain a confession. During an interview about Zoe's new scheme, Lister said:

[She] can't let Mike continue to think that Sarah killed herself because it must be awful for a parent to continue thinking that about their child. Zoe wants justice, especially as Lydia — Sarah's real murderer — is living with Mike! Zoe decides that the only way she can sort everything out is to befriend Lydia and elicit a confession out of her. She doesn't really have a clue what she's doing, but she wants to get a confession out of Lydia. She can't go to the police because they've closed the case, so Zoe takes matters into her own hands."

Zoe and Lydia kiss as part of Zoe's plan to expose Lydia as Sarah's killer (2009).

Lister continued, "It all gets really messy from here! Because Lydia's really deranged, Lydia starts thinking that because she loved Sarah and Sarah loved Zoe, if she gets with Zoe, that'll be the final piece in the puzzle and it'll all work out." She explained: "Lydia starts becoming obsessed with Zoe and to keep control, Zoe has to go with it. There's a point where Lydia kisses her! And then Mike walks in and kicks Zoe out."

Lydia discovered Zoe's true intentions for befriending her, and set out to take revenge. In a second interview with E4, Lister stated: "I was really surprised when I learned about Zoe's 'master plan' to get Lydia to confess because I think after everything that Zoe's been through [...] the last thing she wants to do is ever see Lydia again, let alone try and make friends with her! But that is her only way, so I think it's really interesting." She continued: "The fight and the chase stuff with Lydia in the graveyard was really good, we filmed it at night. I was dressed as Madonna. We were in a cemetery, it was brilliant!..."

The culmination of the plot saw Lydia stab Zoe. The storyline was described as a "brutal attack" and at the time producers refused to reveal if Zoe would survive. Describing the terror Lydia causes for Zoe, a spokesperson for the serial stated: "Zoe can’t believe it when Lydia admits the parachute was meant for her. As soon as she realises Lydia wanted her dead she tries to run. That’s when Lydia pulls out a knife and stabs her." This led to a fight between Lydia and Charlotte who arrives with Dave Colburn (Elliot James Langridge). They both fight to grab the knife while an unconscious Zoe bleeds, ultimately leading to the arrest of Lydia when the police arrive. She is later charged with the murder of Sarah and the attempted murder of Zoe. Several weeks after the character was stabbed, she was seen feeling as if no one wanted to be in her company. After three of her longtime friends snubbed her ideas to make a fresh start elsewhere, ultimately she was she went travelling with her former boyfriend Mike Barnes (Tony Hirst) and Gilly Roach (Anthony Quinlan).

=== Return ===
On 10 September 2025, it was announced that Lister had reprised the role again and would appear on-screen again "soon".

== Storylines ==
=== Backstory ===
Born in 1987 to Graham (Paul Clarkson) and Christine Carpenter (Race Davies), Zoe is the older sister of Archie Carpenter (Stephen Beard). During her time at secondary school, Zoe was overweight and self-conscious. She sought comfort in her teacher and fell in love. The pair began an affair, which was never discovered. While at school, Zoe also had a relationship with Joe Spencer (Matt Millburn), who had arrived in Hollyoaks as a student three years before her arrival.

=== 2006–2010 ===
Zoe arrives as a new student at the college, studying Film Studies. She eventually grows closer to her ex-boyfriend Joe. Zoe, Kris Fisher (Gerard McCarthy), Joe and Olivia Johnson (Rochelle Gadd) are in The Dog in the Pond public house when Sam Owen (Louis Tamone) sets it on fire. Zoe escapes but Joe and Olivia die. Zoe has a one-night stand with Zak Ramsey (Kent Riley). After rejecting the advances of Will Hackett (Oliver Farnworth) and entering a relationship with Will, Zoe is abused and manipulated by him. He stops Zoe from leaving to study in New York City, resorting to stealing her passport and breaking her hand. He spies on her via webcam, and drugs her, making it look like a suicide attempt. When Zoe discovers that Will has been spying on her, he ties her up on the college roof and confesses his love for her. Will eventually lets Zoe go and is arrested. A traumatised Zoe leaves to stay with her parents.

Zoe starts a relationship with Darren Osborne (Ashley Taylor Dawson). When Darren's stepmother, Frankie Osborne (Helen Pearson), fosters a seven-year-old child called Daisy, Zoe gets on well with her and is angry when Darren has her sent away. Zoe ends their relationship, although they go on to reconcile. Darren becomes addicted to gambling and begins to steal Zoe's money. Darren has sex with Jessica Harris (Jennifer Biddall) after they win at a casino. When Zoe discovers this, she ends their relationship again, though helps him through his gambling addiction.

Sarah Barnes (Loui Batley) invites Zoe to move in with her, however her father Mike Barnes (Tony Hirst) is angry to find Zoe using Sarah's sister Amy's (Ashley Slanina-Davies) bedroom. When Mike's wife, Kathy (Sarah Jane Buckley), begins to suspect an affair between Zoe and Mike, and throws all Zoe's clothes out into the street. Mike then asks Kathy to move out. He and Zoe sleep together, unknowingly recorded by Amy's boyfriend Ste Hay (Kieron Richardson), who exposes them. Sarah lashes out at Mike and Zoe. She flaunts her older boyfriend Roger Kiddle (Quentin Tibble) in Mike's face, which backfires when Roger makes a pass at Zoe and they become an official couple. Sarah is able to forgive Zoe, and comforts her when she has a pregnancy scare. Mike is very upset about the idea of Zoe being pregnant.

Zoe visits her old school with Sarah and Nancy Hayton (Jessica Fox), recalling her relationship with her former teacher. She and Sarah get drunk and sleep together, which they both regret and agree to keep quiet. Their one-night stand is later revealed, however, leaving Mike devastated. He throws them both out, before realising how much he loves Zoe and offering to take her back, only for her to refuse. When Archie destroys Zoe's film project, essential for her graduation, lecturer Adrian P. Kennedy (Richard Lawrence) gives her an extension. Zoe finds a script belonging to Mike which he wrote 20 years ago about his decision to give Sarah up for adoption. Zoe uses the script and films it, and Adrian screens it in the SU Bar. At the screening, Sarah discovers the planned adoption and is in turmoil. Mike goes to see Adrian to tell him of the plagiarism. Adrian says that if she sleeps with him, he will not tell the university. Zoe considers Adrian's offer but later claims she would rather be a failure than sleep with him, leading to him failing her project. Zoe then has a brief relationship with Natty (Danny Tennant).

Zoe goes on a parachute jump with Sarah, Fernando Fernandez (Jeronimo Best), Steph Cunningham (Carley Stenson) and Gilly Roach (Anthony Quinlan). Sarah's ex-girlfriend, Lydia Hart (Lydia Kelly) appears and is jealous of Sarah and Zoe's friendship. Lydia lies to Zoe, telling her that Sarah had attempted suicide after their affair the previous year, and warns her to stay away from Sarah. That night, Sarah and Zoe get drunk and return to their tent, where Sarah makes a pass at Zoe. Sarah reveals that whilst she had not intended to kiss her, Zoe was the only person she had ever been able to rely upon. Zoe and Sarah later discover Lydia's lies and Sarah decides to end their relationship for good during a discussion with Zoe. Lydia overhears the conversation and sabotages Zoe's parachute before the jump in an attempt to kill her. When the parachutes are mixed up by accident, Zoe's deploys successfully, but Sarah falls to her death. Upset, Zoe ends up sleeping with a grieving Mike for comfort. Lydia slits her wrists after planting the knife she had sabotaged the parachute with behind Zoe's bed. Zoe is then arrested in front of Mike under suspicion of Sarah's murder and is later charged.

Mike visits Zoe in prison, despite Lydia manipulating him, and Zoe is able to convince him that she was not to blame for Sarah's death. During her trial, Mike tells the court he believes his daughter committed suicide, and Zoe is found not guilty and is released. She then decides to expose Lydia as Sarah's killer. Zoe moves in with Mike and Lydia, and tells Lydia that her feelings towards her have changed. The pair share a kiss, just as Mike and Amy walk in. Mike then tells Zoe to leave. Lydia discovers that Zoe is using her, and plots revenge. On New Year's Eve, she gets Zoe to meet her in a church, so they can admit their "relationship" to Sarah. Zoe initially goes along with this, but then changes her mind, runs out and is knocked unconscious. Zoe is able to get a confession from Lydia, before running away again. She is startled to see Sarah's grave for the first time. Lydia finds Zoe and stabs her as Charlotte Lau (Amy Yamazaki), Dave Colburn (Elliot James Langridge) and Mike arrive. Mike then cradles Zoe as he calls an ambulance.

Zoe recovers, and after inspiration from Hannah Ashworth (Emma Rigby), she decides to go travelling, along with Kris and Zak. Kris and Zak change their minds, however, due to their friends Nancy and Michaela McQueen (Hollie-Jay Bowes). Zoe plans to leave herself, but as she packs her belongings to leave, Mike is convinced to join her. Zoe, Mike and Gilly say their goodbyes and leave the village. In August, six months after leaving the village, Zoe makes Zak and Kris Fisher (Gerard McCarthy) an offer to come to London and help her organise a party for a rich person.

In April 2017, Zoe returns to the village with Mike and Kathy for Amy's funeral. When Kathy arrives at Ryan Knight's (Duncan James) house, she argues with Mike over allowing Zoe to attend Amy's funeral.

== Reception ==
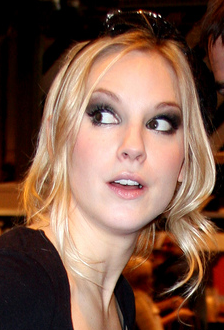
Zoë Lister thought it was "hilarious" to be nominated for a "Sexiest Female" award.

In 2008, Lister's role as Zoe saw her nominated for the "Sexiest Female" award at The British Soap Awards, however she lost to co-star Roxanne McKee. Lister was asked in an interview if she was disappointed to not win the award. She replied: "Not at all! It was lovely to be nominated, and also a bit hilarious, but beyond that, I wasn't desperate to win. I really wasn't bothered! I was more than happy that Roxanne [McKee] won it — and I guessed she might do anyway." When Zoe's affair with Mike Barnes (Tony Hirst) began, there was some controversy over the storyline, due to the age gap between the pair. However, Hirst stated: "I think the controversy has subsided somewhat. It's not an illicit affair, it's known about now. It was shocking to some people at the beginning but it wasn't by any means illegal. There were some complications but they are both grown-ups!" The parachute stunt won 'Spectacular Scene Of The Year' at the 2010 British Soap Awards. At the 2010 Inside Soap Awards the storyline gained nominations in the category of "Best Stunt". Kris Green of Digital Spy described the skydive as one of the best stunts he had seen in a long time, commenting that Zoe's reaction to Sarah's death made him shed a tear, and that the episode on a whole was "amazing". The parachute stunt won 'Spectacular Scene Of The Year' at the 2010 British Soap Awards. Asian News International included Sarah and Zoe second on their top ten "girl-on-girl kisses on TV" list.

Grace Dent of The Guardian commented on the realism of Zoe's storyline involving Adrian stating: "hapless Zoe failed her exams after refusing to shag dismal tutor Adrian. Predatory lecturers taking advantage of gullible women? Actually, that's a plot line I can get my head around. The problem with being an academic perv these days is that one day sooner or later, the truth will out." Lesbian culture website AfterEllen.com opined "she doesn't seem like the type of woman to give up without a fight" where Sarah and Mike are concerned. They also branded her storyline "scandalous" and said "It appears that in the UK, some television writers actually pay attention to what their actors want." This was in response to Lister suggesting the storyline.
