= Sarah Barnes =

UK soap opera character, created 2005

- Hollyoaks character
- Portrayed by: Loui Batley
- Duration: 2005–2009
- First appearance: 6 October 2005
- Last appearance: 23 October 2009
- Introduced by: David Hanson
- Spin-off appearances: Hollyoaks Later (2008–2009)
In-universe information
- Occupation: Student
- Father: Mike Barnes
- Mother: Kathy Barnes
- Sisters: Amy Barnes
- Nephews: Lucas Hay
- Nieces: Leah Barnes

Sarah Barnes is a fictional character from the British Channel 4 soap opera Hollyoaks, played by Loui Batley. She debuted on-screen during the episode airing on 6 October 2005. Sarah was introduced by executive producer David Hanson as part of the Barnes family. In 2009, Batley quit the serial in order to pursue other projects. The character has been central to many key storylines, one of the earliest the high-profile gay storyline involving supercouple John Paul McQueen and Craig Dean.

The theme of sexuality was further explored through Sarah, seeing her have a one-night stand with Zoe Carpenter and a serious relationship with Lydia Hart, which Batley initially found strange to portray because of Sarah's many relationships with male characters. Other storylines include a modelling career, competing in swimming competitions and her many relationships. According to Batley, Sarah relies on people too much for support and was "man-crazy" in her early years. Sarah's final storyline is her death in a skydiving accident, which was a first for a British soap opera. The storyline aired in the second series of Hollyoaks Later and was devised by producer Bryan Kirkwood. Sarah's death won "Spectacular Scene Of The Year" at the British Soap Awards in 2010 and the scenes have been praised by certain critics.

== Casting ==
Auditions were held for the part of Sarah, the eldest daughter of the Barnes family and actress Loui Batley secured the role. On 1 July 2009, Digital Spy reported that Loui Batley had quit the soap and would leave towards the end of the year. Loui's decision matched co-worker Zoë Lister (Zoë Carpenter). The Hollyoaks website officially announced on 23 July 2009 that both Batley and Lister would leave towards the end of that year. Their final storyline was described as "a tragic curtain call for one of them", stating that either Sarah or Zoë would die. Batley wanted to quit the serial in December 2008 when her contract ran out. Kirkwood asked her to stay another six months with the promise of a good exit storyline. The plot also involved Zoe and Lydia Hart (Lydia Kelly). She made it clear to Kirkwood and new executive producer Lucy Allan that she would leave afterward. Allan then came up with the idea of writing Batley out of the serial in its sister show Hollyoaks Later. Upon hearing Kirkwood's ideas for her exit storyline, Batley said: "I've been there for quite a while and it was a great ending for the character - I couldn't have asked for a better way to go..." Hollyoaks Later producer Bryan Kirkwood said: "Loui's been brilliant in Hollyoaks and she's massively underrated. She's been at the centre of some of the biggest storylines on the main show. She never turned in a performance less than top-notch and I wish she had a little more recognition for that. She's a very strong actress and it's been fantastic to work with her - and great to be involved in her exit."

== Development ==
=== Craig Dean's affair ===
In 2007, Sarah discovered fiancé Craig Dean's (Guy Burnet) affair with best friend John Paul McQueen (James Sutton), in the storyline dubbed "McDean". The storyline reached its climax as the truth is revealed "dramatically" at her engagement party. Sarah walked in on the pair kissing, A Hollyoaks spokesperson stated in an interview with Digital Spy, "John Paul's sick of all the lies and decides enough is enough. He sends a text from Craig's phone asking Sarah to come upstairs to see him. Safe in the knowledge that Sarah is on her way, JP sets about seducing Craig. When she walks in, she can't believe what she's looking at..." Sarah tried to recover from this and Batley said: "I don't think she got over Rhys, either. Craig more so, though. He absolutely destroyed her happiness and belief in men. Her relationship with Craig was going to be her life and she put so much effort into it, emotionally and physically, and it completely destroyed her." Batley said Sarah could not handle the fact he cheated on her with another man. She opined this was the reason her storyline with Zoe and Lydia worked well. However John Paul's betrayal also had impact on Sarah's life because he was one of her best friends. Batley said: "John Paul was her confidante and she thought they were best friends - it's hard to say which part made more of an impact on her. It was all just one horrible experience. It was the betrayal from both of them."

=== Sexuality ===
Sexuality continued to be a focal point in Sarah's storyline. The new plot featured Sarah questioning her sexuality after a one-night stand with Zoë. Speaking to Digital Spy, Batley said Sarah and Zoe always been close. Zoe is the best friend she has ever had because in her life people have always let her down, whereas Zoe has been "her rock"; despite their fall outs. Batley felt this to be the reason why they share a mutual friendly love for one another. In comparison, Sarah's feeling intensified and Batley commented: "For Sarah it's something more - she completely relies on her and that turns into love for her as well."

Sarah then embarked on her first full relationship with a woman, with Lydia. The pair have a series of "misunderstandings" until Sarah admits her feelings for Lydia and comes out. The rocky relationship led to Lydia being jealous of Sarah and Zoë's friendship, and eventually Sarah's death within the show.

When asked if she thought Sarah had come to terms with the fact she is a lesbian, Batley said: "I don't know because from the beginning, Sarah was always boy crazy, so for her, I don't think it's about being one way or the other — I think she's just very clingy. Batley also gave her views on how Sarah should have developed, opining it would have been good for her to spend more time on her own, be herself and learn who she really is. She felt that Sarah had too often clung on to people and believing that ultimately it would make her happy. Sarah tries this notion with Zoe, describing this Batley added: "I think that's what happened with Zoe as well because they were such good friends. With Lydia, she brought something to her and she got on with her and was sparky, which is something that Sarah liked. I don't know if she'd suddenly turned, though. Maybe she was more bisexual than anything."

=== Departure and death ===
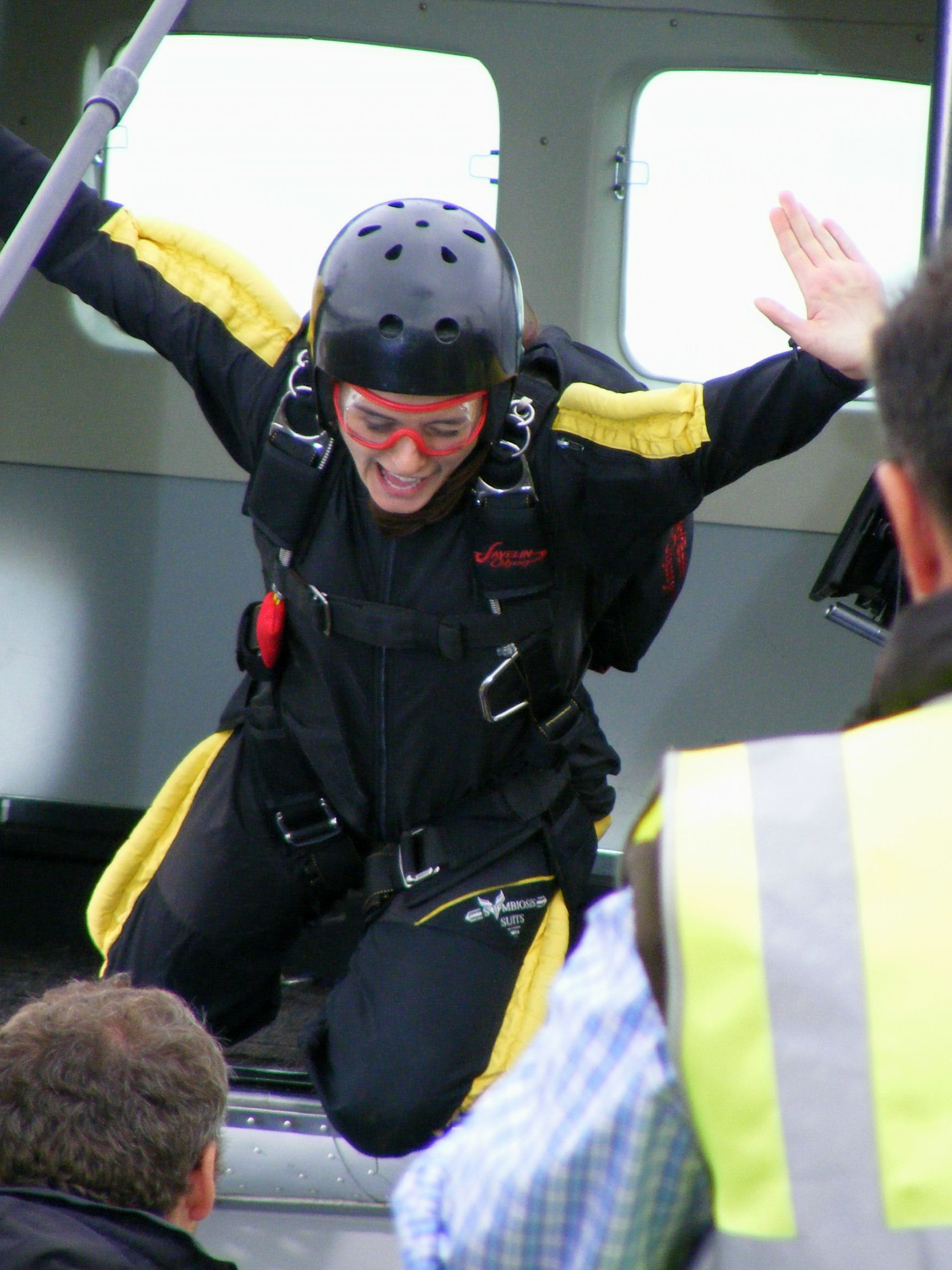
Loui Batley (pictured) filming her final scenes for Hollyoaks at Tatenhill Airfield, Staffordshire.

Alongside Batley's departure, it was that revealed Lister, who plays Zoe, would also leave the show. The exit storyline was described as a "tragic skydiving death" caused by a jealous Lydia. Prior to transmission of the skydiving, Lister had explained the storyline during an interview with Sky TV. She said Lydia initially severed a parachute to end her own life, later deciding to cut Zoe's parachute so she could have Sarah to herself. She also explained that viewers were not permitted to know who would have parachute. The parachute mix up was described as the storyline's "dramatic twist". Speaking on how Zoe's friendship with Sarah causes Lydia to commit her actions, Lister stated:

Zoe's not always been a great friend, for example this year she plagiarised Sarah's dad's script to use as her degree project and that revealed a lot about Sarah's history and her life. It's not been great but there's a lot of love there between them. Zoe's not a lesbian, it was a bit of an experimental phase, but Sarah will always hang on to that. So when Lydia turns up, Sarah obviously has a bit of thing for Zoe and Lydia just can't take it and starts going mental.

It was revealed that cast members filmed on a number of location settings. One of these included an army barracks. They also filmed scenes at Tatenhill Airfield. The airfield's staff had been asked to remain secretive regarding details of the storyline. Lister explained that the episodes were fun to film and they had to do "funny" stunts. Lister was the only cast member out of her, Batley and Kelly who performed the aired skydiving for real. A Hollyoaks producer released two pictures of funeral wreaths, one reading 'Zoe' and the other 'Sarah', in order to confuse viewers further as to whom the victim would be. When the episode aired it played out with Sarah dying in the jump. When executive producer Bryan Kirkwood described the exit to Batley, she thought it was a "perfect and amazing" end for Sarah. Further adding that "It really draws a line under the four years" of Sarah's storylines.

== Storylines ==
Sarah's parents Mike (Tony Hirst) and Kathy Barnes (Sarah Jane Buckley) struggled to cope when Kathy got pregnant with Sarah, as the two were still teenagers at the time. They discussed putting her up for adoption, but Mike became attached to Sarah after her birth and the couple decided to keep her. They later had another daughter named Amy.

Sarah attends Hollyoaks High and becomes best friends with Nancy Hayton and Hannah Ashworth. Sarah also befriends Rhys Ashworth (Andrew Moss) and Gilly Roach (Anthony Quinlan), Rhys and Sarah grow closer, but he is put off by her age. Despite her mother's high hopes for her to become an Olympic swimmer, Sarah begins dating Rhys. Kathy is horrified and vows to stop Rhys seeing Sarah. Kathy then seduces an intoxicated Rhys and she has a one-night stand with him. When Sarah finds out, she dumps him and starts to despise her mother. Few months after, Sarah regrets dumping Rhys and forgives him. However, he takes nude photographs of her and shows them to his friends. Disgusted, she ends her relationship with Rhys. Sarah grows close to Gilly but decides not to begin a relationship.

Sarah grows close to Craig Dean and they begin dating. Sarah, Hannah, Nancy, Craig and John Paul McQueen all become close friends. Craig believes there is something happening between John Paul and Sarah and he dumps her. They later get back together and declare their love for each other. Craig drunkenly kisses John Paul at a school dance. Sarah accepts that it was just a drunken mistake and supports John Paul when he comes out as gay. Sarah encourages John Paul in his first relationship with Spike (Tom Vaughan). One day, Craig aggressively kisses Sarah at school and she is so disgusted that she runs off. Craig later apologises, but Sarah makes it clear that if another incident like that happens again, they are finished.

Sarah is pursuing a modelling career and delves deep into the modelling world, in spite of Craig's negative feelings about it. Craig dumps Sarah over their differences, but they later reunite and go on holiday to repair their problems. Sarah overhears an argument between Craig, John Paul and Spike and believes Craig is cheating on her. Craig suddenly proposes to Sarah and she happily accepts. Craig convinces Sarah not to tell anyone about their engagement until he gets her a ring. Sarah is over the moon about her engagement to Craig and prepares to move to Dublin to him. Sarah's perfect world comes crashing down around her when she walks in on John Paul and Craig kissing at their engagement party. Sarah announces what she saw to everyone at the party. Sarah is devastated to learn that they had an affair and that Craig gave John Paul a watch while she had to buy her own engagement ring. The next day, Sarah forgives Craig and says she still wants to be with him. Craig tells Sarah that while he does love her, he wants to be with John Paul now, breaking Sarah's heart. Things get worse for Sarah when she learns Craig has asked John Paul to come to Dublin with him and declares she feels like Craig has just replaced her without a second thought. Sarah begs Craig to take her back, but he turns her down once again. Devastated, Sarah throws her engagement ring into the pond. Sarah is later disgusted to learn that John Paul has changed his mind about being with Craig and tears into him for stealing her fiancé for nothing.

Sarah grows close to Rhys again and they reunite. However, Rhys is using her to make Beth Clement (Sinéad Moynihan) jealous. Beth and Sarah are friends and she convinces Sarah to split with Rhys. Sarah befriends Zoë and asks her to move in. Kathy accuses Zoë and Mike of having an affair and Mike breaks up with Kathy, who leaves him. Mike confesses his feelings for Zoë and they begin a secret relationship. Sarah discovers the truth and moves in with friend, Nancy Hayton (Jessica Fox). Sarah finds an odd friend in Elliot Bevan (Garnon Davies), who develops feelings for her. Elliot's physics lecturer Roger Kiddle (Quentin Tibble) meets Sarah and after embarking on a fling, Elliot uncovers the truth. He becomes angry but eventually forgives Sarah. Sarah splits up with Roger when Sarah finds out he has a wife and made a pass at Zoë. Sarah starts to fall in love with Elliot and confesses to him. Elliot reciprocates and the pair become a couple. Soon after, Elliot decides they are too different and dumps her. Sarah is jealous when best friend Hannah dates him.

Craig returns to town for a short visit and the two exes finally make their peace with each other. Sarah even encourages Craig to get back together with John Paul. Sarah makes up with Zoë and moves back into the Barnes home. They, and Nancy, then set off on a holiday to Zoë's old school so that she could make a speech on careers to current students. While at the school, it becomes apparent that Zoë had been involved in an affair with her teacher while she was fifteen. A drunken Sarah then accuses her of using her dad to fulfil her fantasy of being in a relationship with an older man. The pair end up in a fight. Sarah and Zoë make up as they are left alone in the hotel room. The pair drunkenly share a kiss before sleeping together. After this, Sarah feels more guilty and cannot look at Zoë, who tells her it was a drunken mistake and urges her to put it behind her. Arriving back in Hollyoaks, Sarah makes Zoë leave for a trip to give them space. Zoë returns and Sarah threatens to tell Mike, however Kris Fisher (Gerard McCarthy) overhears and tells Nancy and Mike, who throws both Sarah and Zoë out. A guilty Sarah has random sex with a stranger. The stranger is Archie Carpenter (Stephen Beard), who turns out to be Zoë's brother. Sarah is then shocked when it turns out Archie is rating her against other girls. She later has sex with Warren Fox (Jamie Lomas).

Sarah moves back home when she reconciles with Mike. Whilst working at a dance class Persephone Hart (Elizabeth Hadley) claims that Sarah has assaulted her. The girl's older sister, Lydia manages to get her fired. Sarah and Lydia then become good friends. Lydia later reveals herself to be a lesbian. The pair then share a kiss which leaves Sarah confused. She becomes attracted to Lydia, she thinks she is bisexual and that her experience with Zoë had started her sexuality crisis. Sarah eventually admits to having feelings for Lydia, and the pair begin a relationship. Lydia later accuses Sarah of cheating with Zoë. Mike begins to accept Sarah's sexuality. Sarah discovers she was nearly given up for adoption by Mike and Kathy as a baby, after Zoë steals a script from Mike and uses it in her film for college. Sarah is angry at Zoë for using her but they later make up. Sarah breaks up with Lydia when she catches her kissing ex-girlfriend Charlotte Lau (Amy Yamazaki). Lydia grows increasingly jealous of Sarah and Zoë's friendship. Lydia causes trouble between Sarah and Charlotte, so Sarah and Zoe go on an adventure trip. Lydia follows them as they get drunk, and Sarah tells Zoe she loves her. Lydia overhears this, and it further fuels her jealousy. As they prepare for a skydive, Lydia cuts Zoe's parachute; however, they become mixed up. Sarah falls to her death with her faulty parachute. Lydia frames Zoe but is eventually convicted.

== Reception ==
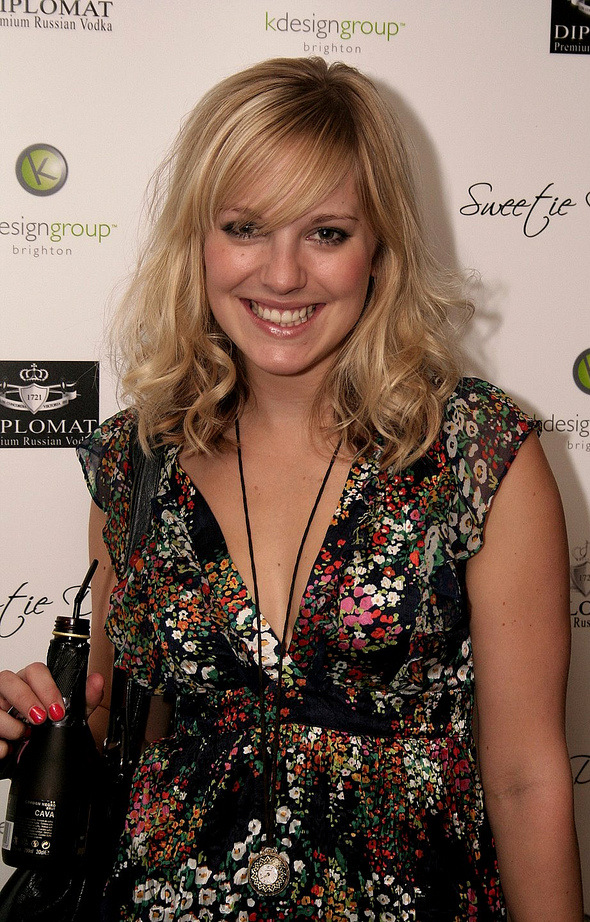
Zoë Lister (pictured) plays Sarah's best friend Zoe Carpenter. Critics have praised the storylines the pair feature in.

Kris Green of Digital Spy described the skydive as one of the best stunts he had seen in a long time, adding that the reaction to Sarah's death made him shed a tear and that the episode on a whole was "amazing". The parachute stunt won 'Spectacular Scene Of The Year' at the 2010 British Soap Awards. At the 2010 Inside Soap Awards the storyline gained nominations for Batley in the categories of "Best Exit" and "Best Stunt".

Virgin Media profiled some of Hollyoaks' "hottest females" in their opinion, of Sarah they stated: "Sarah Barnes' sex appeal stretched so far she even had to experiment with the ladies. Turns out that wasn't the brightest idea she'd ever had - her jealous girlfriend Lydia finally polished her off good and proper." Olly Riachards men's lifestyle magazine FHM commented on Sarah stating: "the one who fell out of a plane and splatted all across the ground, leading to a really drawn out and really boring plotline" Holy Soap opined that Batley "livened up screens as lesbian temptress Sarah Barnes." and that she had many "major storylines". Digital Spy brand Sarah as, just a "wannabe model".

The Bristol Evening Post branded Sarah's coming out as an "amazing storyline", said Sarah is a "leggy brunette" and opined her attraction to Lydia developed into "full-blown obsession". Asian News International included Sarah and Zoe second on their top ten "girl-on-girl kisses on TV" list. The Liverpool Daily Post ran a quiz focused on style, one of their result trends read "You like to put your own stamp on trends and tend to mix designer and high street clothes to create the look you want. You are an "urban aspirant" like Sarah Barnes, from Hollyoaks." When Sarah dated males to convince herself she is straight, Lesbian culture website AfterEllen.com stated that "Sarah will surely find out de-gaying is just not possible". They also branded her storyline "scandalous" and said she "has had her fair share of failed relationships - with men, that is".
