= Charlotte Lau =

Fictional character from Hollyoaks

- Hollyoaks character
- Portrayed by: Amy Yamazaki
- Duration: 2009–2010
- First appearance: 9 June 2009
- Last appearance: 17 September 2010
- Introduced by: Lucy Allan
- Spin-off appearances: Hollyoaks Later (2009); Hollyoaks: Freshers (2010)
In-universe information
- Occupation: Barmaid (2009–2010); Student (2009–2010)

Charlotte Lau is a fictional character from the British Channel 4 soap opera Hollyoaks, played by Amy Yamazaki. She debuted on-screen during the episode airing on 9 June 2009 and was introduced by series producer Lucy Allan as the ex-girlfriend of Lydia Hart (Lydia Kelly). In September 2010, it was announced that Yamazaki and Charlotte had departed Hollyoaks and her final scenes had already aired, with Charlotte making her final appearance on 17 September 2010.

== Character creation and casting ==
In May 2009, in an interview with entertainment website Digital Spy, Hollyoaks series producer Lucy Allan announced that a number of students at Hollyoaks Community College would be moving out of Halls of Residence in preparation for the new term. Former BBC Three Coming of Age actress Amy Yamazaki joined the cast as Charlotte Lau, the new barmaid at the SU Bar and ex-girlfriend of established character Lydia Hart (Lydia Kelly). She made her first on-screen appearance on 9 June 2009. In July 2009, it was announced by the media that Charlotte would become one of the new students. Charlotte was noted for being the second homosexual female character to be introduced in 2009.

In September 2010, Yamazaki was unexpectedly written out of the show. After her departure, the Hollyoaks official website confirmed her final scenes had already aired. Fans of Charlotte became angry with executive producer Paul Marquess because they thought he had axed her. In reality Yamazaki had quit to concentrate on her writing. Whilst interviewed by entertainment website Digital Spy Marquess stated: "I just want to put the record straight that Amy who played Charlotte wanted to go, because I think a lot of people were really angry with me for 'axing' Charlotte – which I didn't! She wanted to go off and write, so that's why she fell off an arch!"

== Characterisation ==
Charlotte's personality has been evident from inception. She has an alternative dress code, with Channel 4 publicity stating that she is a 'Tokyo grunger'. She is also described as super friendly, funny and cool and knows how to hold her own. With script writers referencing on-screen that she may be unhinged. After the character had appeared on-screen for a brief period of time her style was described as 'funky and feisty' and has been applied a trend of bold clothing to create a 'Tokyo pop' look.

Charlotte is also very open about her sexuality and makes reference to it on-screen on a number of occasions. In October 2009, Amy Yamazaki, whilst talking about the character's sexuality, stated in an interview with PA: "As far as I'm concerned, acting is just acting whether you're kissing a boy or a girl. Chances are you're not going to fancy them – they're just people you work with. I don't want to come across as someone who'll kiss anybody but when it comes to an acting job, I don't have an opinion if my character fancies a person whether it be boy, girl or, I don't know, mushroom."

== Storylines ==
Charlotte first appears on 9 June 2009, as a barmaid in the SU Bar and the ex-girlfriend of Lydia Hart (Lydia Kelly). Archie Carpenter (Stephen Beard) immediately starts flirting with Charlotte and is annoyed to find out she is a lesbian, realising many girls in the village are lesbians or have had lesbian encounters. Ravi Roy (Stephen Uppal) is embarrassed when Charlotte tells him she is a lesbian after he flirts with her. On 24 July, Charlotte begins to get closer to Lydia. The pair see Lydia's girlfriend Sarah Barnes (Loui Batley) kissing Rhys Ashworth (Andrew Moss) and assume something is going on, however they are unaware she did it to get music tickets for her and Lydia. After Lydia finds this out, she apologises and the pair kiss. Charlotte watches as they kiss and appears upset. Charlotte teases Nancy Hayton (Jessica Fox) about her sexuality, and is convinced she is a lesbian, although Nancy repeatedly disputes this. When Sarah splits up with Lydia, Charlotte offers her a shoulder to cry on. This later leads to Lydia trying to kiss Charlotte but she retaliates. Lydia storms off after Sarah sees them both and blames everything on Charlotte.

Charlotte later becomes a Psychology student at Hollyoaks Community College and moves into the halls. She then mistakenly thinks India Longford (Beth Kingston) is a lesbian and offends her. On what would have been Lydia and Charlotte's anniversary, Lydia is given a bouquet of dead flowers. Sarah and Zoe Carpenter (Zoë Lister) blame this on Charlotte, claiming she is trying to split them up. Charlotte then accuses Zoe of attempting to break up the relationship. Lydia takes Charlotte's side, creating a divide in her relationship with Sarah. Sarah later dies during skydiving unbeknown to Charlotte the parachute was tampered by Lydia but Zoe is wrongfully arrested this leads to a feud between Charlotte and Zoe's brother Archie who is desperate to defend his sister. Charlotte and Lydia get back together, but agree to keep quiet. During Zoe's trial, Charlotte attends. When the knife Zoe apparently used to cut the parachute is shown to the court, Charlotte recognises it, as she gave Lydia it before the camping trip. Charlotte confronts Lydia, who immediately admits to using the knife, but in a suicide attempt. After Charlotte pleads with her to tell the police, Lydia tells her if she goes to prison, she will kill herself. Despite this, Zoe is found not guilty of Sarah's murder. However, she befriends Lydia to gain a confession. When Charlotte discovers Zoe's plans, she admits to Mike and Dave Colburn (Elliot James Langridge) about Lydia's murder of Sarah. Charlotte rushes to the local cemetery, where Lydia and Zoe are, with Dave and Mike close behind. When she gets there, Lydia stabs Zoe at Sarah's grave. Charlotte pleads with Lydia, who threatens her. As they realise Zoe is still alive, Lydia tries to get the knife. However, Charlotte attacks her and Dave gets the knife.

New fresher Jamil Fadel (Sikander Malik) tries it on with Charlotte, unaware she is a lesbian. Charlotte takes drugs, given to her by Doug Carter (PJ Brennan) in Chez Chez. She dances with Jamil, who is convinced that he can win her over. Charlotte leaves the nightclub and suggests going into town with India and Jamil, who are unaware she had taken drugs. Charlotte climbs on top of the village wall arch and asks them to join her. Doug watches her and Jamil on the arch and rushes to stop them. However, Charlotte loses her balance and falls off. Charlotte is taken to hospital, where she regains consciousness. Doug is made to leave after Charlotte tells everyone he gave her the drugs. Charlotte fears she will be paralysed and decides to leave Hollyoaks.
