= The Garage (TV series) =

- Starring: Graham "Jock" Campbell; Alicia Campbell; Glyn Bennett; Sandy Fairbairn; Ed Blasi; Lindsey Baldwin; Danielle Christie; Claire Watts; Caroline Andre Jabbour; Ricky Coates; Gemma Pugsley; Rob Rowles; Wayne Browring; Stefan Marino; Ewan Innes; Darren Clarke
- Narrated by: Tony Hirst
- Country of origin: United Kingdom
- No. of seasons: 3
- No. of episodes: 32

Production
- Production locations: Marbella, Spain
- Running time: 50 minutes (Discovery Channel) (without commercials)

Original release
- Network: Discovery Channel
- Release: 2006 – 2007

The Garage is a British television programme broadcast on Discovery (UK and Ireland). It features the staff of English Mobile Mechanics in Marbella, Spain, following the activities of the garage and initially it followed new staff hires as they adjusted to life in Spain whilst coping with their new jobs and their boss, Jock Campbell. As work in southern Spain depends on tourists or villa owners that winter elsewhere the Garage's trade is highly seasonal. Four out of the five new recruits found themselves with insufficient paid work (no customer jobs to book time to) so eventually announced that they were leaving and vacated their positions.

== Episode list ==
The broadcast of series three was originally delayed, and unlike series one and two, is rarely repeated. Series three was shown on the UK Quest TV channel starting in April 2013.

=== Series one ===
Series one had seven episodes, without episode titles.

=== Series two ===
S02E01, Jock's Back!
S02E02, Airbags All Round
S02E03, Ed The Hero
S02E04, Ed's Clutch Déjà vu
S02E05, Sandy's Story
S02E06, A Hard Week's Delegation
S02E07, Jock the 2nd–hand Car Dealer
S02E08, Love is in the Air
S02E09, Living for the Weekend
S02E10, Against the Clock
S02E11, The End of the Summer
S02E12, Final Best Bits

=== Series three ===
S03E01, New Blood
S03E02, Ferrari
S03E03, Subtle Engineering
S03E04, Spanner in the Works
S03E05, Old Jag
S03E06, No More Girls
S03E07, Hot and Bothered
S03E08, Locking Horns
S03E09, Lost and Losing It
S03E10, Leaks
S03E11, Dream Cars
S03E12, The Garage Refueled
S03E13, Adventures

== Ricky Coates ==
Ricky Coates, whose last major appearance was in episode 9 of series three, died on 27 February 2010 aged 27.
