= Archie Carpenter =

Fictional character from Hollyoaks

- Hollyoaks character
- Portrayed by: Stephen Beard
- Duration: 2008–2010
- First appearance: 3 November 2008
- Last appearance: 28 May 2010
- Created by: Bryan Kirkwood
In-universe information
- Father: Graham Carpenter
- Mother: Christine Carpenter
- Sisters: Zoe Carpenter

Archie Carpenter is a fictional character from the British soap opera Hollyoaks, played by Stephen Beard. The character debuted on-screen during the episode broadcast on 3 November 2008. He was introduced as the brother of the established character Zoe Carpenter (Zoë Lister). Archie moved into the college halls of residence. In March 2010, executive producer Paul Marquess wrote the character out of Hollyoaks as part of his rejuvenation of the series, which included multiple cast changes. Archie made his final appearance during the episode broadcast on 28 May 2010.

== Creation and casting ==
Archie's character was created to be a new student studying at Hollyoaks Community College and was given immediate links with other characters such as an on-screen sister, Zoe Carpenter, played by Zoë Lister. It has been mentioned on and off screen that the two character experienced different upbringings from their parents.

Regular auditions were held for the part but the result of the audition process was unique to other castings within the series. The audition process was featured in a reality television series. In 2007, MTV commissioned a reality television series titled Living on the Edge. Broadcast in the United Kingdom, the series focused on teenagers living in the wealthy British village of Alderley Edge. During the second series, Stephen Beard was the only returning cast member. During this season, Beard was seen auditioning for various roles and it documented the whole audition process for the character of Archie. He was later offered the part on a six-month contract, later being offered another contract for the same period of time.

== Development ==
Channel 4 publicity described Archie stating that "Zoe's younger brother Archie is a cheeky chap who loves to wind his sister up. But no more than he loves trying to woo the ladies!" Archie has been portrayed as a promiscuous character, one that doesn't think of the consequences of his hasty actions. At the time of joining the show, Beard said of his character: "He is a bit of a womaniser, he's constantly on the look out for new talent but he gets shot down a lot too, I think he thinks far too highly of himself! He'll go to the point that not many blokes will, he will never give up." In an interview with media website Digital Spy he said of his character: "He's definitely a wild one. People who have watched Living On The Edge may draw some comparisons. I go to a certain point in life, but Archie's definitely got bigger balls - he'll take things all the way. He's got no fear. At the same time, though, he has a sensitive side. He's like the big class clown but when he gets a knock, he really feels it. I think Archie's intended to bring a bit of light-hearted humour to the show." He has also been described as a wannabe entrepreneur coming up with wild ideas of how to make money fast.

In one story created for the character, Archie and his friends Kris Fisher (Gerard McCarthy), Zak Ramsey (Kent Riley) and Elliot Bevan (Garnon Davies) find £100,000 in cash in an attic of their new flat they share. They all decide to keep it for themselves. The story explored an issue involving localised discrimination. Zak is portrayed as a Scouser / Liverpudlian and when some of the money goes missing, Archie automatically presumes Zak must have stolen it due to his Scouse identity. Beard told an Inside Soap reporter that Archie is "quite un-PC in his thinking, because Zak's a Scouser, there's no doubt in Archie's mind that he took the cash." Beard added that Archie's accusations causes a fight between the friends as Zak is forced to defend his background. Elliot later admits he took the money to help his girlfriend Leila Roy (Lena Kaur).

In early 2010 it was announced that Allan had stepped down from the position of executive producer, with Paul Marquess taking over the role. It was soon revealed that he planned revamp Hollyoaks, changing the productions team, then began a cast cull starting with the axing of three established characters. Stephanie Waring (who plays Cindy Hutchinson) then revealed that all remaining cast members feared their characters would be next to depart from the series. One month later the cast cull continued as Marquess announced his plans to axe a further 11 characters, including Archie at the end of Beard's contract. He finished filming in early 2010.

== Storylines ==
In December 2008, Leila accused Archie of stealing chocolates from her advent calendar however it was later revealed she had been sleepwalking and stole them herself. He shares a kiss with Sarah Barnes (Loui Batley), who later witnesses Archie intimate with another girl. Archie attempts to reunite with Sarah occasionally, however she continuously rejected him. In a final attempt to regain her affection, he posts a billboard of himself half-nude. In February 2009, he kisses Sarah again. In March, Sarah succumbs to temptations and begins a relationship with him however Sarah dumps him as she notices his affection for her lesbian friend Lydia Hart (Lydia Kelly). Sarah revengefully dances with Lydia. In June, Archie endeavours to prevent his parents from uncovering Zoe's failed college course by "collapsing". Myra McQueen (Nicole Barber-Lane) resuscitates him and he verbally abuses by calling her a "troll", leading to Myra and Mercedes Fisher (Jennifer Metcalfe) trying to attack him. Later, Archie was undressed in bed, kissing an unseen person. He lay back and confesses to sleeping with Myra. Archie, along with Kris Fisher (Gerard McCarthy), Elliot Bevan (Garnon Davies) and Zak Ramsey (Kent Riley), move into Warren Fox's (Jamie Lomas) old flat after his death. While clearing out the attic, the boys found £100,000 of Warren's money and agree to keep the money safe for months, deciding if the money didn't belong to anyone, they would split it four ways. However, things become dangerous as Archie's greediness worsens. He calls his friend Jed to assist him in pretending to kidnap him in order for the other boys to give Jed the money, leading to Archie fleeing with it. However, Kris runs to Nancy Hayton's (Jessica Fox) house with the money and plans to go to the police. Jed actually kidnaps Archie seriously and gives him an ultimatum; either he receives the money or he would throw Archie over a roof. Elliot, Zak, Kris and Nancy salvaged him but, realising how the money affected their friendship, Kris abandoned it. After this, everyone neglected Archie, furious for Archie's betrayal.

During Freshers week, Archie has a one-night stand with India Longford (Beth Kingston) and humiliates her by ignoring her publicly. In October 2009, Archie receives a call, which he doesn't identify on screen. The unknown caller informs him that Zoe is charged with the murder of her best friend and Archie's ex-girlfriend, Sarah, who has just died in a skydiving accident when her parachute failed to deploy which resulted in her death. Unbeknown to everyone, Lydia, Sarah's girlfriend has framed Zoe for Sarah's death as she was the culprit who sabotaged Sarah's parachute that was intended to kill Zoe. Archie is keen to support his sister. During an argument with Lydia, Archie realises Lydia was the saboteur and accuses her during Sarah's wake. Zoe is found not guilty with everyone believing Sarah committed suicide. Archie develops a drug habit and drops an ecstasy tablet in Nancy's flat which is then nearly taken by her young nephew Charlie Dean (Joshua McConville). Elliot also gets the blame as he had let Archie in. Neither Nancy nor Elliot want to speak to Archie again. On a night out with Kris and Zak, Archie makes comments about Zak's dead brother Caleb who was killed on patrol in Afghanistan. These comments offended Zak and he punches Archie. This leaves Archie with no friends in the village. Archie leaves after Elliot is taken into hospital having taken Archie's pills.

== Reception ==
In 2009 Ruth Deller of entertainment website Lowculture criticised Archie stating: "Zoe’s generic lairy student brother serves no purpose, essentially being an even more obnoxious version of Zak, whilst Zak is still on the show. And there’s no believability about his relationship with Zoe whatsoever." A writer from Western Mail branded Archie a "sex-obsessed student". They found Archie's story in which he attempts to expose Lydia's crimes ironic because of his low intelligence. They quipped "normally, Archie couldn't find his way out of a paper bag so it's funny how the death of Sarah Barnes and his sister Zoe's subsequent incarceration have transformed him into Sherlock Holmes."
