= Elaine Glover =

English actress, singer and chef

Elaine Glover (born 1982) is an English actress, singer and chef.

== Early life and education ==
Glover was born in 1982 in Harrogate, North Yorkshire, and grew up in Skipton. She trained at Rose Bruford College where she gained a BA Honours in Actor Musicianship.

== Career ==
Glover is an original cast member of Simon Beaufoy's The Full Monty, which opened at the Lyceum Theatre in Sheffield, and after touring transferred to the Noël Coward Theatre in London's West End where it received an Olivier Nomination for Best New Comedy. She is an original cast member of Bad Girls: The Musical, which opened at the West Yorkshire Playhouse and later had a West End transfer to the Garrick Theatre.

She has also taken leading roles at the Royal Exchange, Manchester (Sex, Chips & Rock & Roll), West Yorkshire Playhouse (The Lemon Princess - based on the true story of Rachel Forber who died of CJD in 2001) Theatr Clwyd (Dick Whittington), Salisbury Playhouse (Come Fly With Me, Cinderella and Little Robin Redbreast), Hull Truck Theatre (Flint Street Nativity), Battersea Arts Centre (20th Century Boy) and Nottingham Lakeside Arts (The Retirement Of Tom Stevens).

She played PC Lucy Slater for two series of BBC1's police drama HolbyBlue. She played the character of Katie Jones in series 4 of ITV's Footballers' Wives. She joined the cast of Hollyoaks as Abi Raven in 2009; and then went on to join the cast of Emmerdale as D.C. Laura Prior in 2010–2011. Other television credits include The Royal, Silent Witness, Casualty, Doctors, The Bill, Holby City, Heartbeat and Footballers' Wives: Extra Time.

She has been a guest on the panel of ITV’s Loose Women.

She was a soloist at London's O2 Arena for the charity concert "The Long And Winding Road: Voices For A New World", with guest performances from Bill Bailey and Kevin Eldon. She was also a soloist fronting Frank Renton's 18-piece brass band at the Royal Albert Hall in Christmas With The Stars.

She took the leading role of accidental serial killer Rose Clements in the independent British black comedy feature film, Whoops! The film premiered at Vue cinema in Piccadilly, London for the Raindance Film Festival, followed by a tour of Vue cinemas nationwide. It also made the official selection for the Toronto International Film Festival.

== Cookery ==
In 2011, Glover underwent training at Radiantly Alive in Ubud, Bali, to become a certified Raw Food Chef. She later went back to Bali to work as a chef and mentor at Radiantly Alive, and then went on to work as a chef at Nama, a raw vegan restaurant in Notting Hill, London. She also spent time working in Nice, France, as menu consultant and coordinator for vegan and raw restaurant KoKo Green.
