= Gareth Phillips =

Gareth Phillips is a Welsh former actor, best known for playing Nick Williams in the long-running BBC school drama, Grange Hill. He appeared from 1991–1993.

Gareth currently lives in Brecon, Powys, Wales, running a pub called "The Gremlin". He also teaches drama and occasionally appears on stage locally.

He entered the "Mr Wales" competition in 1998 and achieved 3rd position.

Media offices
Preceded by Paul Marquess	Series producer of Hollyoaks; 20 June 2011 – 23 December 2011	Succeeded by Emma Smithwick
