= Tony Hirst =

British actor (born 1967)

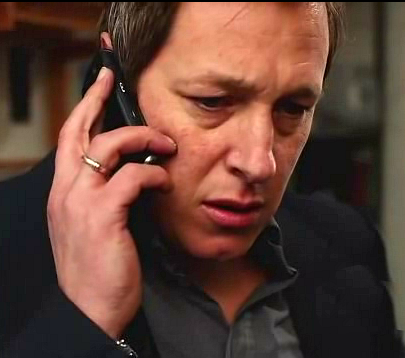
- Hirst in the 2009 short film Pickpocket
- Born: 21 January 1967 (age 59); Manchester, England
- Occupations: Actor; narrator; theatre director
- Years active: 1990–present
- Partner: Sue Hirst
- Children: 2

Tony Hirst (born 21 January 1967) is an English actor and narrator best known for playing Mike Barnes on the soap opera Hollyoaks and in Coronation Street as Paul Kershaw, the love interest of Eileen Grimshaw. Hirst also narrates the UK version of How It's Made, shown on Quest and the Discovery channels, and various programmes for Channel 4.

== Filmography ==
Hirst's acting roles include Mike Barnes from Hollyoaks, Martin Gooch from The Ghost Squad and Steve Kingsley from Holby City. He has narrated TV documentaries such as Blueprint for Disaster, 2005, The Garage, Smash Lab, and How It's Made since 2001. He also narrates some of the programme trailers on Fox and Channel 4. Hirst appeared as a fireman called Paul on Coronation Street during the show's 50th anniversary in December 2010. Paul returned to the soap as a regular character during October 2011. It was revealed on 24 February 2013 that Hirst would be leaving Coronation Street in 2013 at the end of his contract. In 2014, Tony Hirst narrated two seasons of Food Factory and in 2015 narrated season 1 of Home Factory both on Discovery science.

Year	Title	Role	Notes
2025	Riot Women	Jerry Booth	
2023	Old Guy	William	Feature Film
2023	Brassic	Dougie Ratcliffe	Series 6
2023	Boiling Point	Philip	
2022	Better	Howard	
2021	Everything I Know About Love	Mike	
2021	Red Rose	Martin Taylor	
2021	Pistol	Tom Cook	
2021	Stephen	Bill Vaughan	
2017	Broken	Sergeant Denis Kilcaid	
2015	Casualty	Andre Benson	
2014	Glue	Simon Kendle	
2011	Coronation Street	Paul Kershaw	Series Regular
2010	Law & Order: UK	Michael Raines	
2006	Hollyoaks	Mike Barnes	Series Regular
2005	The Ghost Squad	Martin Gooch	
2005	Hard Hat	Doug Grimes	Short Film
2005	Holby City	Steve Kingsley	
2003	Shameless	PC Dave Whiteley	
2003	No Angels	Peter Good	
2003	Doctors	Jim Taylor	Guest Lead
1999	99-1	Wilson	
1998	Brookside	Gary	
1997	The Specials	Warren Lawson	
1991	Sharp End	Gazza	

== Other TV appearances ==
Hirst appeared on Ready Steady Cook, on BBC Two on 5 March 2008, and lost to Zoë Lister, who played Zoe Carpenter in Hollyoaks. He played the part of Rom, a Roman man, on CBBC children's history programme The Romans in Britain shown on BBC2 and "Uncle Jake" in the BBC children's programme The World Around Us. He played the part of a policeman in the first series of the Channel 4 show Shameless. He appeared on the Channel 4 show No Angels as an "ambulance chaser" in the first series.

Hirst narrates Benefits Street and the UK versions of Mike Rowe's Dirty Jobs and How It's Made on Discovery channels and Murder, Mystery and My Family on BBC. Hirst portrays a man sent back from the future to warn of an impending alien invasion in an ad being aired on Discovery Science to promote their Out of this World campaign.

== Theatre ==
Hirst produced two one-man shows touring the UK during the summer and autumn 2008, including four weeks at the Edinburgh Fringe Festival. The first play Wombman, written and performed by Ricky Payne, which Hirst also directed and the second Wacker Murphy's Bad Buzz written and performed by Edwin Mullane.

== Personal life ==
Hirst lives with partner Sue Colgrave and they have two children, actress Kate Colgrave Pope and actor son Jack Colgrave Hirst. Hirst has an MSUK Competition Licence and competed in the 2012 Silverstone Classic Celebrity Challenge race. He has also competed in the Aero Racing Morgan Challenge in a Morgan Plus 4 Clubsport, winning the Championship in 2019.
