= Garnon Davies =

Welsh actor (born 1982)

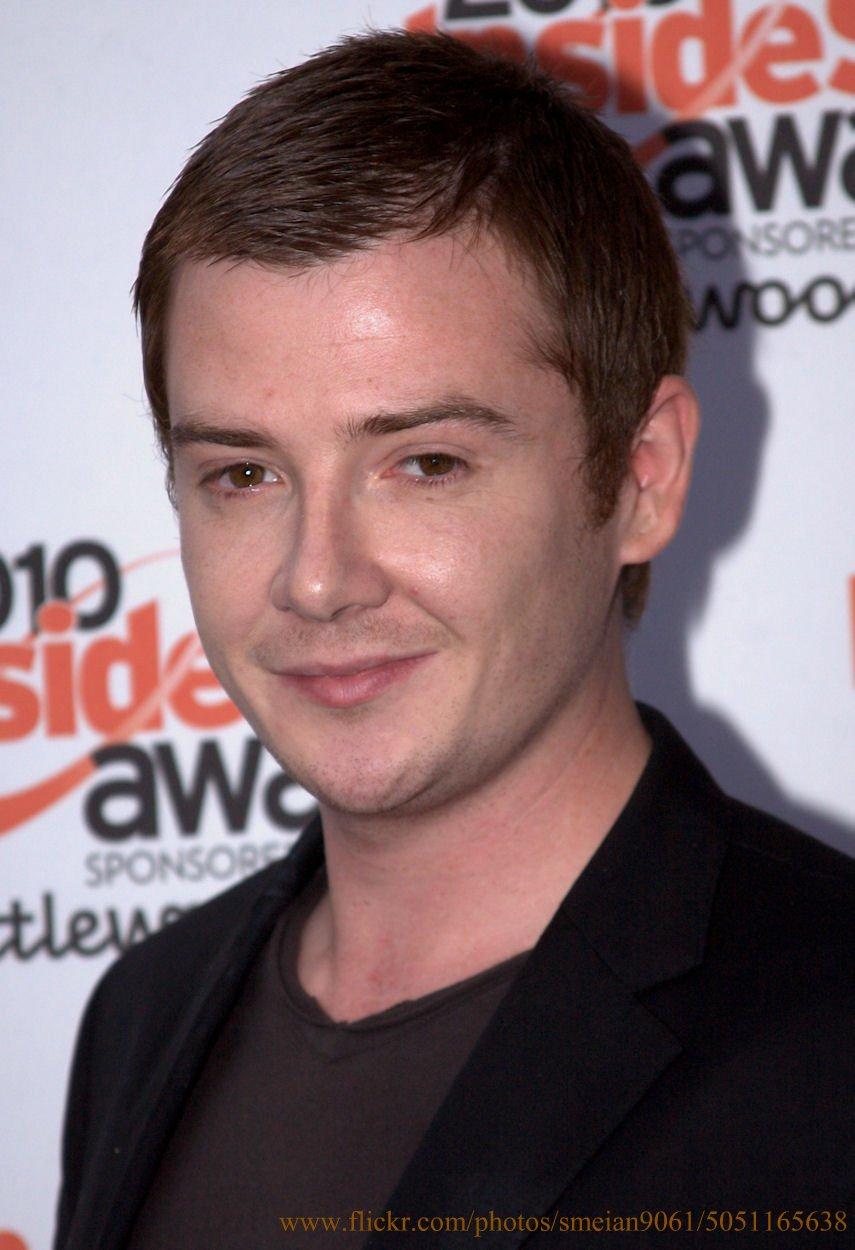
- Garnon Davies at the 2010 Inside Soap Awards
- Born: 6 December 1982 (age 43); Pyle, Bridgend, Wales
- Occupation: Actor
- Years active: 2007–

Garnon Davies is a Welsh actor, best known for his television appearances.

== Career ==
Davies was born in Pyle, near Bridgend, South Wales, on 16 December 1982. He attended Ysgol Y ferch O'r Sger primary school and then went on to Welsh-speaking secondary school Ysgol Gyfun Llanhari. After a few years at that school he went on to study for his GCSEs and A-levels in Porthcawl Comprehensive School.

On leaving Porthcawl Comprehensive Davies attended the prestigious Webber Douglas Academy of Dramatic Art in Kensington, London where he trained as an actor for 3 years. Since leaving he has played many roles on TV and in theatre but is mostly known for his work in Channel 4's Hollyoaks where he played Elliot Bevan. Since leaving Channel 4's Hollyoaks, Davies has gone on to appearing in stage and screen productions. Working in Wales and on shows such as Doctors, Da Vinci's Demons and Holby City. Garnon is an avid collector of antique chairs and has over 300 pieces.

In 2008, he participated in a campaign held by the Anti-Bullying Alliance.

In 2014, Davies took the role of Charlie in an Afternoon Drama, titled Atlas, on BBC Radio 4. The episode was broadcast on 15 December 2014. He has acted in over 50 Radio Drama/Comedy episodes. Garnon is also part of a comedy duo, where he performs on the comedy circuit around the country.

== Filmography ==
Year	Title	Role	Notes
2007–2010	Hollyoaks	Elliot Bevan	Regular role
2008, 2010	Hollyoaks Later	Elliot Bevan	Regular role
2011	Doctors	Philip Dudley	Guest role
2013	Da Vinci's Demons	Laley	Guest role
2013	Holby City	Adam Buchanan	Recurring
2016	Stella	Alan	Guest role

Davies has been working at drama school Italia Conti Academy of Theatre Arts since 2019 where he teaches acting and musical theatre.
