= Amy Yamazaki =

British actress

- Born: 1991 (age 34–35)
- Occupation: Actress
- Years active: 2001–2012

Amy Yamazaki is a British retired actress best known for her portrayal of Charlotte Lau in the long-running Channel 4 soap opera Hollyoaks.

== Career ==
Yamazaki began acting when she was ten years old. She made her on-screen acting debut in BBC medical drama Holby City in 2001. Since then, she has appeared in television show such as CBBC's Powers, BBC Three's Marigold and she also appeared in the pilot episode of BBC Three comedy Coming of Age as one of the lead characters Jas.

In 2009, Yamazaki began playing lesbian student Charlotte Lau in Channel 4 soap opera Hollyoaks. In 2010, Yamazaki left Hollyoaks after a year in the show.

Year	Title	Role
2012	Absolutely Fabulous	Agent
2011	Law and Order UK	Bowling Alley Assistant
2009	Hollyoaks Later	Charlotte Lau (1 episode)
2009–2010	Hollyoaks	Charlotte Lau
2007	Coming of Age	Jas (Pilot)
2005	Marigold	Charlotte
2004	Powers	Song-Li Harris
2001	Holby City	Alison Campbell
