= Lydia Kelly =

British actress (b. 1990)

Lydia Rose Ellen Kelly (born 25 September 1990 in Manchester) is a British actress best known for her portrayal of Lydia Hart in the long-running Channel 4 soap opera Hollyoaks. Kelly departed the show in 2009, with her final scenes airing on 1 January 2010.
