= Hollyoaks Later series 4 =

Hollyoaks Later
- Series 4
- No. of episodes: 5

Release
- Original network: E4
- Original release: 5 September – 9 September 2011

Series chronology
- ← Previous; Series 3 Next → Series 5

The fourth series of Hollyoaks Later is a British television series and late night spin-off of Channel 4 soap opera Hollyoaks. The series aired in September 2011 at 10pm. The series revolved around Silas Blissett's (Jeff Rawle) search for another murder victim which culminated in the death of Rae Wilson (Alice Barlow), the stag do of Riley Costello (Rob Norbury), the hen party of Mercedes McQueen (Jennifer Metcalfe) and Ricky Campbell (Ashley Margolis) and Duncan Button's (Dean Aspen) trip to fat camp.

== Development ==
Following the success of the first three series it was confirmed that a fourth series had been recommissioned. It was confirmed Hollie-Jay Bowes would return as Michaela McQueen for the series. It was later announced that cast members would include Jennifique, a new addition to the McQueen family played by Amy Walsh and Johnny to be played by ex-EastEnders actor Chris Coghill. By early June scenes had begun filming. The first promotional image for the series was released on 23 August. On 30 August a trailer for the series was released.

Scenes were filmed in Ibiza with Mercedes McQueen, Myra McQueen, Michaela and Jennifique. For her hen party Mercedes and Myra travel to Ibiza where they meet up with Michaela and Jennifique, who is dating Mercedes' first love Johnny. Jennifer Metcalfe, who plays Mercedes, revealed that the storyline was devised to help delve into the character's past and explain her behaviour. Scenes were also filmed in an outdoor activities retreat for Riley Costello's stag do.

These scenes included several action-packed scenes, which included a white-water rafting accident. During Riley's stag do tensions arise between Riley and Mitzeee. Rachel Shenton, who plays Mitzeee, explained that the series explores the relationship between Mitzeee and Riley and begins to show the audience the character's real feelings towards each other. During Riley's stag do his brother Seth believes he has killed a stripper. Miles Higson who plays him told Digital Spy's Daniel Kilkelly that the storyline would be a "really difficult time for Seth" which would make him contemplate suicide and push him "really close to the edge".

It was revealed that Jeff Rawle who portrays Silas Blissett would feature in the series. Series producer, Emma Smithwick, later confirmed that the series would feature the death of a regular character at the hands of Silas. Viewers were led to believe Theresa would become Silas' next victim when a leaked clip of Silas preparing to attack Theresa was posted on YouTube. Alice Barlow, who portrays Rae Wilson quit her role in early 2011 which prompted producers to begin devising a memorable exit for the character. Barlow's exit was not announced so the audience were surprised when, in the concluding episode of Hollyoaks Later, Rae is brutally murdered by Silas. Barlow said that because her death scenes played out during Hollyoaks Later it allowed producers to be creative with the content as "there's no limits" and they could "do whatever they wanted with it".

== Plot ==
The series follows four stories. Serial killer Silas Blissett (Jeff Rawle) targets Theresa McQueen (Jorgie Porter) only to kill Rae Wilson (Alice Barlow). Riley Costello (Rob Norbury) embarks on a stag do along with brother Seth (Miles Higson) and friends Animal (Aston Kelly), Doug Carter (PJ Brennan) and Warren Fox (Jamie Lomas) whose partner Mitzeee (Rachel Shenton) crashes the stag. Mercedes McQueen (Jennifer Metcalfe) embarks on her hen do along with mother Myra (Nicole Barber-Lane) where she meets up with sister Michaela (Hollie-Jay Bowes), cousin Jennifique (Amy Walsh) and old flame Johnny (Chris Coghill). Ricky Campbell (Ashley Margolis) and Duncan Button (Dean Aspen) go to fat camp where Duncan plans to lose weight and his virginity.

== Cast ==
Character	Actor
Mitzeee	Rachel Shenton
Michaela McQueen	Hollie-Jay Bowes
Warren Fox	Jamie Lomas
Mercedes Fisher	Jennifer Metcalfe
Theresa McQueen	Jorgie Porter
Myra McQueen	Nicole Barber-Lane
Rae Wilson	Alice Barlow
Will Savage	James Atherton
Silas Blissett	Jeff Rawle
Riley Costello	Rob Norbury
Doug Carter	PJ Brennan
Seth Costello	Miles Higson
Duncan Button	Dean Aspen
Ricky Campbell	Ashley Margolis
Jennifique McQueen	Amy Walsh
Johnny	Chris Coghill
Animal	Aston Kelly
Honey	Bethan Coundley
Ed Wolfe	Tom Austen
Bruce Power	Ross O'Hennessy
Kelly Saunders	Dannielle Malone
Michael	Geoff Breton
Klaus	Roger Ringrose

== Ratings ==
Episode #	Airdate	E4
Episode #	Airdate	Viewers
1	5 September 2011	776, 000
2	6 September 2011	621, 000
3	7 September 2011	735, 000
4	8 September 2011	612, 000
5	9 September 2011	657, 000
