= Newt (Hollyoaks) =

Fictional character from Hollyoaks

- Hollyoaks character
- Portrayed by: Nico Mirallegro
- Duration: 2007–2010
- First appearance: 22 October 2007
- Last appearance: 25 June 2010
- Created by: Bryan Kirkwood
In-universe information
- Occupation: Student
- Mother: Shelly Newton
- Adoptive father: Jack Osborne
- Adoptive mother: Frankie Osborne
- Half-brothers: Jenson Newton

Barry "Newt" Newton is a fictional character from the British Channel 4 soap opera Hollyoaks, played by Nico Mirallegro. He debuted on-screen during the episode airing on 22 October 2007. He was introduced as the serial's first emo character and as the foster son of Jack (Jimmy McKenna) and Frankie Osborne (Helen Pearson). During the character's duration he was involved in notable storylines including schizophrenia, a suicide pact and living in foster care. In 2010, Mirallegro quit the serial to pursue other projects. Newt left the village on 25 June 2010.

== Character creation and casting ==
Newt has been noted as the first "emo" character for Hollyoaks and has been shown to follow certain emo characteristics, such as a reluctance to communicate with those around him. Producer Bryan Kirkwood stated: "He's a little belter who after a couple of years in the background will hopefully prove to be a really big character." Actor Nico Mirallegro was cast into the role.

In March 2010 it was announced that Mirallegro would be leaving the serial after almost three years to pursue other projects, although his departure was included in the list of 11 other departees that new series producer Paul Marquess had axed.

== Character development ==
=== Characterisation ===
Newt takes on the characteristics of an angry young "emo" character Of his appearance Newt differs from Mirallegro because he has to wear a wig and fake piercings. Mirallegro explained the look has its set backs commenting: "The wig as it’s very hot and annoying and itchy!" The serial's official website describe him as a "kind-hearted emo" and also "loyal to his friends".

=== Schizophrenia ===
One of Newt's key storylines has been the portrayal of schizophrenia, which started in 2008. Mirallegro carried out intensive research for the role including watching the films such as Sybil, Fight Club, Secret Window and A Beautiful Mind. He also read a series of books focusing on the illness. The storyliners who pitched the story worked with called a charity Rethink, the UK's leading mental health charity, Mirallegro also took advice from them. In an interview with lastbroadcast.co.uk, Mirallegro revealed he was completely comfortable with the storyline stating: "I’m liking the direction a lot. It’s been great to play Newt, great from an actor’s point of view to play such challenging role and also to highlight such an important issue too." Mirallegro also revealed that it was to be a long storyline-arc confirming: "Unfortunately his diagnosis is just the beginning of Newt’s problems."

=== Suicide pact ===
In July 2009, at the Hollyoaks press day, series producer Lucy Allan announced that there would be a 'big stunt' involving Newt in October the same year. In September 2009, it was announced that a new character, Rae Wilson (Alice Barlow) would join the serial as part of a "shock suicide plot" involving Newt, which would see the two characters jump off a bridge.

Behind the scenes filming took place at Stanley Dock in Liverpool where they had to act out the stunts. Allan praised Barlow and Mirallegro for their willingness to perform their own stunts, during an interview with Liverpool Daily Post she stated: "The team did a brilliant job at constructing a 45ft tower at Stanley Dock for the main stunt. We had stunt doubles there if the actors felt they did not want to do it. But they are a tenacious bunch and they wanted to do it all themselves. She also added: "They even stayed underwater for three or four minutes for the big underwater sequence."

The storyline came into the spotlight just days before the suicide scenes were due to air, after two young girls in Scotland jumped from the Erskine Bridge into the River Clyde, subsequently dying in their suicide pact. The serial's broadcaster decided to go ahead and air the scenes citing that any similarities were entirely coincidental and they had carefully thought out the decision. Also adding: "The audience will be familiar with the character of Newt and this plotline, which has been both trailed and promoted, has been developing over a number of weeks. Hollyoaks has a strong track record of dealing with sensitive issues, and the transmission will be followed by a programme support announcement directing viewers to a 24-hour helpline." The real-life care home in which the two girls were housed issued a statement criticising the broadcaster for airing the scenes stating: "The decision to air this show is likely to cause further distress."

Whilst interviewed by entertainment website Digital Spy, producer Allan admitted the suicide scenes were her overall favourite from 2009, commenting: "My favourite scene of the year has to be the underwater sequence with Newt, Rae, Eli and Jack the hero! It was a beautiful moment on screen and it was the moment that the audience realised that Newt was trying to kill himself. For me, that moment of realisation made that scene so powerful."

== Storylines ==
=== Backstory ===
Newt was born to his mother Shelly Newton (Beverly Denim), a drug addict. Shelly continued to look after Newt alone until he was three, where social services took him into care. Shelly disappeared and did not visit Newt. Growing up in care, Newt made friends with Eli (Marc Silcock), who was older than he was and looked out for him. When Eli was twelve and Newt was eight, he committed suicide by hanging. Newt found Eli's body and was scarred for life.

=== 2007–10 ===
Newt arrives in Hollyoaks as the fourteen-year-old foster son of Jack and Frankie Osborne (Helen Pearson). Foster brother Darren Osborne steals Frankie's wedding ring and sells them to pay off his gambling debts. He puts Frankie's bracelet he also stole in Newt's bag to frame him. Darren then leads everyone to believe Newt stole them, however he is eventually found out. Newt strikes a friendship with fellow emo Lauren Valentine (Dominique Jackson). Jake Dean (Kevin Sacre) becomes jealous of the time Nancy Hayton (Jessica Fox) is spending helping Newt with his dyslexia and makes an anonymous phone call to the police accusing Nancy of having a sexual relationship with under-age Newt. Nancy believes it was Lauren that made the call and attacks her. Newt is questioned and defends Nancy.

Newt and Lauren read about Sam Owen (Louis Tamone), who had previously burned down The Dog, killing four others, and decide to pretend to be possessed by his ghost, however they do this in front of Sam's brother Russ Owen (Stuart Manning), who lost his girlfriend Sophie Burton (Connie Powney) in the fire. Russ is angry, Newt and Lauren apologise. Newt and Lauren then begin a relationship. The Dog is raided by Warren Fox's old acquaintances, Anthony and Carl, who hold Newt, Louise Summers (Roxanne McKee), Jack and Frankie hostage and demand money. Newt manages to hide and phone the police. After it is over, Newt asks Warren to give The Dog back to Jack, who had been forced into partnership. Newt and Lauren decide to have sex, with Lauren wanting to have it in a graveyard, however Newt tells her he would rather do it at her house. Newt soon realises he is not ready to have sex. Elliot Bevan (Garnon Davies) agrees to help Newt and Lauren with coursework, however when he goes to a picnic with Sarah Barnes (Loui Batley) instead of helping them, Lauren wants to get revenge. A reluctant Newt agrees. After overhearing Elliot having a conversation with Kris Fisher (Gerard McCarthy) about Elliot believing his father was abducted by aliens, the pair post messages to Elliot, pretending to be his father. The pair tell Elliot to meet them in the woods, which he does. Newt and Lauren regret their trick when Elliot begins crying. They run away where Newt trips over something, later revealed to be the body of Sean Kennedy (Matthew Jay Lewis).

Newt's notable emo appearance.

Eli, an old friend of Newt, arrives. Newt hides Eli in his bedroom. Eli and Newt plan to run away together to start a life on their own. Newt says goodbye to Lauren and Jack Osborne (James McKenna), who do not suspect what he is planning. After meeting Eli, they reflect upon their plans. Meanwhile, Lauren watches a tape of Newt writing a threatening message on Frankie's wall, despite previous claims it was Eli. Eli is then revealed to be a figment of Newt's imagination. Lauren tries to explain to Newt that he needs help and tells Frankie what she saw. Newt is admitted to hospital and diagnosed with schizophrenia. Newt returns home and is shocked to see Jack, who had apparently died. Darren, to cover up their life insurance fraud, tells Newt if he tells anyone, he would have to go back to hospital. Eli convinces Newt not to trust his family and to stop taking his medication. Frankie decides to adopt Newt, however his mother refuses. Newt witnesses Niall Rafferty (Barry Sloane) kidnapping his secret half sister Jacqui McQueen (Claire Cooper). Newt tries to tell Lauren to call the police but she thinks it is his schizophrenia, she then calls an ambulance. Later, Newt and Lauren reconcile and kiss. Newt stops taking his medication, which causes erectile dysfunction, so he and Lauren can have sex. Newt then ends the relationship due to Eli. He then tells Lauren to burn everything that reminded him of Eli. Eli then disappeared as Newt began taking his medication. Newt and Lauren then sleep with each other for the first time in Evissa.

Newt and Lauren break up as he begins going out with Anita Roy (Saira Choudhry). Jealous, Lauren begins claiming she is being bullied by Anita, although she is not. Newt dumps Anita and tells her never to speak to him again. Newt and Lauren share a kiss and he makes up with Anita, with Lauren still refusing to admit she lied about the bullying. Newt, Theresa McQueen (Jorgie Porter), Lauren and Anita are made to go to detention. Anita and Lauren begin to argue and start to fight, Newt then throws a bucket of water at them, however misses and soaks Theresa. He then offers her his jumper to wear. As she removes her wet top, she tells Newt to turn around, which he does, however watches her in a reflection on a TV. Theresa tells Newt and Lauren that Anita had tried to bleach her skin in order to become white, Lauren admits she had faked being bullied. Newt is angry at Lauren, however Anita tells him not to fight and that she wants everyone to make up.

Newt, Lauren, Anita, Theresa begin revising at Lauren's house for exams. Theresa gets her cousin Michaela McQueen (Hollie-Jay Bowes) to buy bottles of apple cider for them to drink. Lauren appears in a bad mood and is annoyed when she feels the group are ganging up on her. They start to play truth or dare. After several turns, Theresa is dared to swap her normal glamorous clothes and make-up for Lauren's emo styled wear. Newt is then dared to dress in a track top, baseball cap and trainers, something that Lauren dislikes. Theresa compliments Newt for his appearance and the pair share a kiss. Feeling awkward, Newt and Theresa try to avoid each other. Theresa injures her ankle and Newt takes her home on his skateboard. The pair sit down against a wall, where they share another kiss and are seen by Ricky Campbell (Ashley Margolis), who is meeting Anita, who had used Theresa's picture, for a date. Ricky reveals to Anita he saw Theresa and Newt kissing, however they both convince her he is lying. Newt and Theresa succumb to their passion and have sex. They then carry on their secret relationship behind Lauren's back. They go off on a camping trip, which Anita, Ricky and Lauren end up coming along to. Finally, Lauren discovers Theresa and Newt's relationship and is hurt. Theresa invites Newt to the McQueens for dinner and introduces him as her boyfriend to Myra McQueen (Nicole Barber-Lane), who eventually gives Newt her approval.

Newt and Anita grow close again after Theresa and Newt fall out over her modelling ambitions. Newt, Anita and Lauren break into the school to retrieve Anita's necklace, where, they discover Gaz Bennett (Joel Goonan) has been living. Anita and Newt kiss as Gaz records it on his phone. The trio leave for one of their teacher's secluded country cottage. Ricky turns up, as does Gaz, who tries to pressure Anita into sex. Newt fights with Gaz and rushes out with Anita, Gaz then chases them into the woods. Newt tells Anita to call the police. Anita rushes for help as Gaz attacks her and pins her down and she hits him over the head with a brick, leaving him in a coma. Newt, Lauren and Anita are questioned, with Newt being the prime suspect. Newt admits he has stopped taking his medication, but cannot recall attacking Gaz. After Anita confesses to hitting Gaz, Newt takes off. Due to Newt not taking his medication, Eli returns.

During his time on the run, Newt befriends a teenager, Rae Wilson (Alice Barlow), who he stops from committing suicide. The pair quickly fall in love. Eli takes an instant dislike to Rae and takes over Newt in order to kill her, however Newt stops himself from severely hurting her. Realising they both cannot escape their troubles, Newt and Rae agree to commit suicide together by jumping into a canal. Lauren tells Jack where Newt is and the pair rush to get him, and are shocked to see him threatening to kill himself. After it is revealed to Newt that Rae is just another persona of his schizophrenia, he pushes Eli into the canal. Rae also jumps in, as does Newt. Jack rushes in to rescue Newt and he pulls him out safely. However, Eli and Rae do not resurface. Newt recovers in hospital and is adamant that Rae is real, despite Jack and Lauren telling him he was alone. Newt is released and discovers a picture of Rae in the purse belonging to Lily, an elderly woman he mugged whilst on the run. Newt goes to Lily's door, where he tells her of Rae's death. Despite this, Rae turns up and tells Newt she does not know who he is. Newt tries to tell Rae he is telling the truth but she does not believe him. An upset Newt returns home and decides to change, shaving off his hair and changing his clothes, ultimately dropping his emo appearance. Another local school, Abbey Hill, is merged with Hollyoaks High. Rae is one of the new students. Newt tries to talk to her, but she gets her friend Sinclair to scare Newt off. Newt tells Lauren about the Rae he knew whilst on the run. Lauren then tells Newt that the Rae he had described, is exactly like her.

After the who shot Calvin plot Newt now with the real Rae tries to get Lauren to confess to Spencer that there never was a baby. Rae survives her 18th birthday, despite her grandmother suffering a stroke. Shelley asks Newt to leave with her as she has been offered a job in Scotland. Newt agrees but sadly, Rae cannot join Newt, his mum Shelley and her baby boy Jensen up in Scotland but share an emotional goodbye.

In 2011, Darren phones Newt to tell him about Rae being murdered and he does not take it well. In 2013, Frankie went to visit him. In 2017, Jack call him that Frankie had died, which upset him more.

== Reception ==
An All About Soap writer included Newt's schizophrenia plot in their list of "top ten taboos" storyline list. They assessed that it was one of the "taboos which have bravely been broken by soaps." They opined that writers originally "kept audiences guessing about Newt's illness" via the introduction of Eli.
