= Rae Wilson =

UK soap opera character, created 2009

- Hollyoaks character
- Portrayed by: Alice Barlow
- Duration: 2009–2011
- First appearance: 5 October 2009
- Last appearance: 13 September 2011
- Created by: Lucy Allan
- Spin-off appearances: Hollyoaks Later (2011)
In-universe information
- Occupation: Waitress (2010–2011); DJ (2010–2011); Barmaid (2011)
- Grandmothers: Lily Wilson

Rae Wilson is a fictional character from the British Channel 4 soap opera Hollyoaks, played by Alice Barlow. She appeared in the series from 5 October 2009 until 13 September 2011. Actress Helen Russell-Clark – who went on to play Jem Costello – originally auditioned for the role, but the part was awarded to Barlow. Producer Lucy Allan said Barlow was her favourite addition to the cast during 2009. She made her final appearance on 13 September 2011.

Initially portrayed as an imaginary character in a schizophrenia storyline, Rae was later revealed to be real when she arrived to study in Hollyoaks. She was central to a controversial suicide storyline, and was part of a love triangle with Ste Hay (Kieron Richardson) and Brendan Brady (Emmett J. Scanlan), which left her pregnant by Ste. She miscarried during an argument with Brendan and subsequently feuded with him; Barlow praised her character for being one of the few who dared to oppose the Hollyoaks villain. Rae was originally characterised as a chav with a feisty persona, but underwent a transformation when she attempted to embrace domestic life with Ste. During series four of the post-watershed spin-off Hollyoaks Later, Rae was murdered by a serial killer, Silas Blissett (Jeff Rawle). The late broadcast slot allowed an explicit depiction of her death. Barlow hoped that Rae would be remembered for her strong-willed nature, and that her exit would be considered one of the best in the programme's history.

In 2011, Barlow won an All About Soap award for Rae's love-triangle storyline. AfterElton criticised the lack of character development Rae received, and along with the Sunday Mercury, bemoaned the dearth of realism exhibited in Rae staying with Ste despite knowing that he was homosexual. Readers of the soap opera magazine Inside Soap indicated that they did not want Silas to murder Rae.

== Creation and casting ==
At a July 2009 Hollyoaks press day, series producer Lucy Allan announced that there would be a "big stunt" involving schizophrenic character Barry "Newt" Newton (Nico Mirallegro) in October of that year. It was later revealed that a new character, Rae, would join the serial as part of a "shock suicide plot" involving Newt, in which the two characters would jump off a bridge. Alice Barlow's casting as Rae was announced in October 2009. Barlow stated that she was "absolutely on top of the world" to receive the part, particularly as one of her childhood dreams was to appear in a soap opera. Helen Russell-Clark – who went on to play Jem Costello in the serial – also auditioned for Rae, and reached the final stages of casting. Allan said Rae was one of her favourite additions to the cast in 2009 and expressed her pride in Barlow's performance, saying, "to introduce a character as somebody and then to completely change the character six weeks later, while still delivering the performances that Alice does, is a testament to a young actress." In early 2011, Barlow decided to leave Hollyoaks to pursue other projects. Her departure was kept secret until her exit scenes were aired. Barlow described her time with the programme as "the perfect end" to her teenage years and said she could not "have asked for anything better."

== Development ==
=== Characterisation ===
In her corporeal state, Rae has gone through a series of transformations. Initially a rather angry chav, she relaunched herself as a DJ. Entanglement in a Stendan love triangle then saw her embrace life as a housewife and carer of small children, but when that didn't work out she opted to re-relaunch her DJ career.

— E4 on Rae

During her first appearances as a figment of Newt's imagination, Rae was depicted as a goth with an emo persona. When she was reintroduced as a real person, Rae's character was more reminiscent to that of a chav. The character later underwent a transitional period; she retained her strong personality, but displayed a weaker side resulting from the setbacks she encountered. Barlow found the role challenging, as her own personality is dissimilar from her character's. She described Rae as someone who always makes her opinion known, and hoped she would be remembered for her strong-willed persona.

=== Suicide pact ===
Rae's appearance during Newt's hallucinations (2009)

Rae was introduced as Newt's imaginary friend. They made a suicide pact, and jumped off a bridge together into deep water. The stunt was filmed at Stanley Dock in Liverpool, where a 45-foot (14 m) tower was erected for them to jump from. Although stunt doubles were available, both Barlow and Mirallegro decided to perform their own stunts, and spent around four minutes filming underwater. The storyline received prominent coverage in the media days before the scenes were due to be broadcast because two young girls in Scotland had died in a similar suicide pact, having jumped from the Erskine Bridge into the River Clyde. Channel 4 decided to broadcast the Hollyoaks scenes as planned, and released a statement which explained:

We feel it is appropriate to continue with the transmission of these episodes as this is not a one-off programme but an established and long-running series. The audience will be familiar with the character of Newt and this plotline, which has been both trailed and promoted, has been developing over a number of weeks. Hollyoaks has a strong track record of dealing with sensitive issues, and the transmission will be followed by a programme support announcement directing viewers to a 24-hour helpline.

The care home in which the two deceased girls had been housed criticised the decision, and deemed the broadcast "likely to cause further distress."

Allan said the underwater sequence following the bridge jump was her favourite scene of 2009. She said, "It was a beautiful moment on screen and it was the moment that the audience realised that Newt was trying to kill himself. For me, that moment of realisation made that scene so powerful." Once the suicide storyline had concluded, it was revealed that Rae was a real character in the series.

=== Relationships ===
==== Ste Hay and Brendan Brady ====
Following Newt's departure from the series, Rae began dating Ste Hay (Kieron Richardson). A love triangle formed between Rae, Ste and Brendan Brady (Emmett J. Scanlan), who wanted Ste for himself. Scanlan said that Brendan's actions – paying Veronica (Lynsey McLaren) to try and split Ste and Rae up, and giving Ste money to stay away from Rae – demonstrated Brendan's willingness to use "power and manipulation". Unaware that Ste and Brendan had begun an affair, Rae discovered that she was pregnant. All About Soap magazine wrote that Rae was "knocked sideways" by the discovery, and noted her uncertainty at the prospect of becoming a teenage mother. Brendan and Ste decide to end their affair for Rae's sake, but soon resumed their relationship.

Rae ultimately learnt of the affair; Richardson characterised her response as being "shocked and angry", and Barlow told Inside Soap magazine that the revelation left her character "more torn than ever." The discovery prompted Rae to consider having an abortion, but Brendan convinced her not to, and revealed that he once lost his own child. Barlow called the scenes "really heartfelt stuff", and explained that Ste saw no problem with Rae having the baby, as he already had a son and considered himself a good father, whereas it was "a bigger deal" for Rae, who was childless. Discussing Rae and Ste's relationship, Barlow said that Rae truly loved Ste, and that they had a special connection formed through the hardships they had faced together. Despite this, Rae rebuffed Ste's attempt to rekindle their relationship. However, during an argument with Brendan, Rae suffered a miscarriage. Barlow found the filming of these scenes difficult.

As the storyline concluded, Rae resolved to remain friends with Ste and support him through his difficult relationship with Brendan. This resulted in a feud between Brendan and herself. Barlow explained that Rae had "a handle" on him and was "one of the few characters [able to] stand up to Brendan." She enjoyed portraying this dynamic, and assessed that Rae "always felt like she had the upper hand" as she knew the truth about Brendan's sexuality.

==== Ethan Scott ====
Rae was involved in a relationship storyline with Ethan Scott (Craig Vye), who was already romancing both Liberty Savage (Abi Phillips) and Theresa McQueen (Jorgie Porter). Viewers were initially unaware that Rae was seeing Ethan, but knew that he was cheating on Theresa and Liberty with an unknown third woman. Porter said Theresa, her character, was incredulous when she saw Ethan kissing Rae. Barlow was also surprised by the twist; she had not expected Rae to be involved. Once the three women discovered the truth about Ethan's infidelity, they decided that "the best revenge is humiliation", exposed Ethan's lies and poured gunge over him in front of the entire village. Vye described the storyline as a "classic case of wanting what you can't have". He explained that Ethan was not ready to settle down and would end up alone.

The actors involved made an effort to give the storyline a comedic tone, to keep it from becoming too serious. Porter felt that it reflected real life, as there are men in society who behave as Ethan did. The storyline proved popular with viewers, and both Barlow and Porter received a high volume of messages through the social networking website Twitter from viewers expressing their surprise at Rae's involvement. Digital Spy showcased Rae being exposed as Ethan's lover and her subsequent revenge plot in its "Pic of the day" feature.

=== Departure and death ===
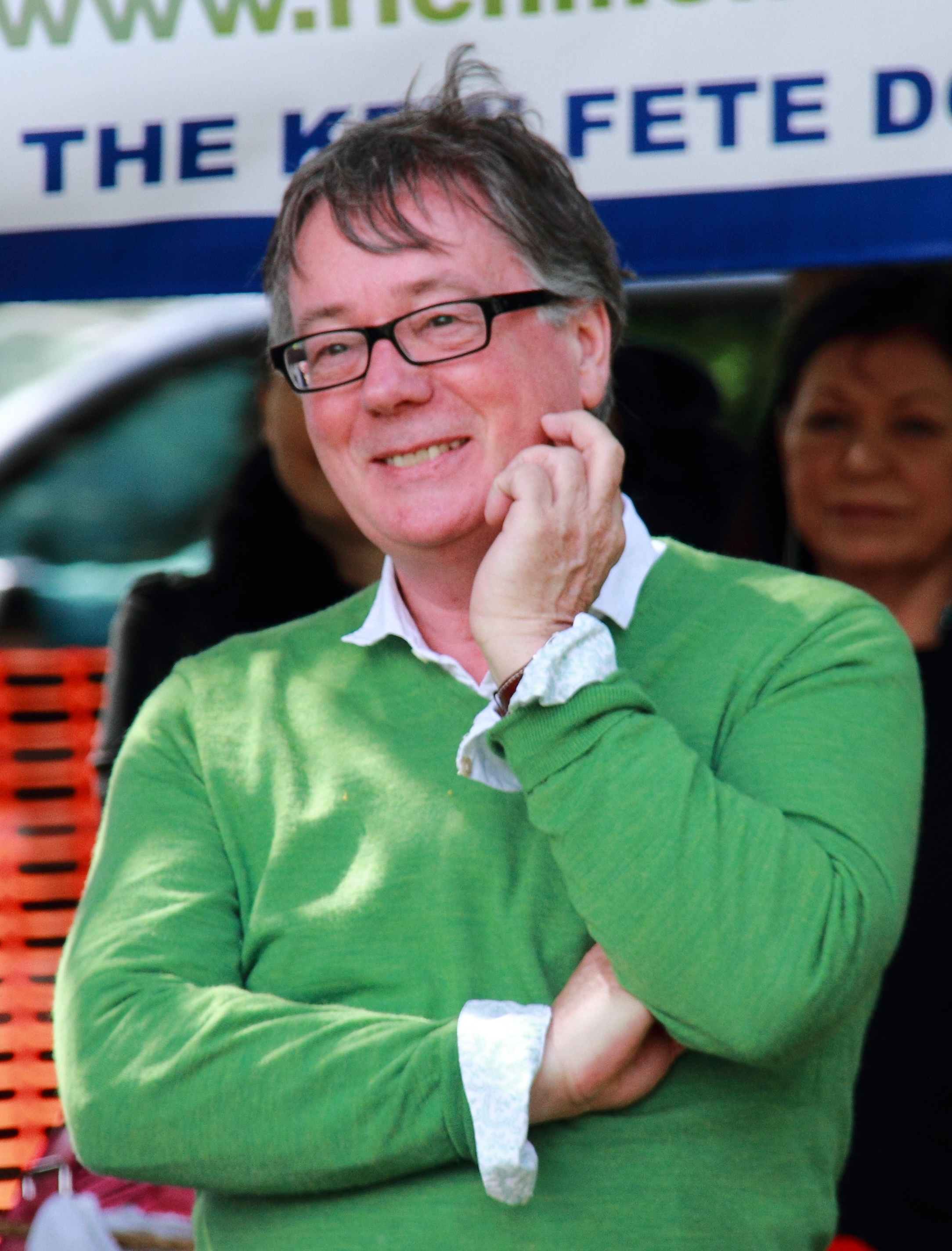
Jeff Rawle (pictured) plays Rae's murderer, Silas Blissett.

Barlow decided to leave Hollyoaks in early 2011, as she felt she had given all she could to the role. This prompted the producers to devise a memorable exit storyline for Rae. Barlow was informed of their plans in March 2011, but her exit, and details of the storyline, were concealed from viewers. Speculation arose that Rae would become the next victim of serial killer Silas Blissett (Jeff Rawle); Barlow tried to discredit these rumours, and denied that she was leaving Hollyoaks as she wanted viewers to be "surprised and shocked" by her exit.

In August 2011, a leaked clip of Silas preparing to attack Theresa was posted on YouTube, which led viewers to believe that Theresa would become his next victim, which was confirmed in the fourth series of Hollyoaks Later. Porter said that it was "scary and worrying"; however, she would not confirm whether Silas killed her character. Emma Smithwick, the programme's producer, confirmed that the late night episodes would feature the death of a regular character.

"It was very emotional, because when you've played a character for two years, you really get to know them inside and out – and Rae has been through so much. It's come to an end now with this Silas twist, but because she's been murdered, it does make it very emotional!"

— Barlow on filming Rae's death scenes. (2011)

When the episodes aired, Silas was angered by Rae's attitude – her desire to use men for casual flings – and realised he could frame Brendan for her murder. He then beat Rae and strangled her to death in an alleyway. Barlow said that because Hollyoaks Later is broadcast late at night, there were no limits to the storyline, allowing the producers to "do whatever they wanted with it." She described Rae's death scene as "absolutely incredible" and loved the chance to work with accredited actor Rawle. She explained that Rae's death had been kept secret in order to shock viewers in the same way the death of Sarah Barnes (Loui Batley) had previously done. Barlow said she was happy and grateful with the nature of her exit storyline, as the opportunity to "go out with a bang" was better than Rae leaving quietly in a taxi. She hoped that Rae's murder would "go down in Hollyoaks history" as one of the best exits. In the aftermath, Brendan was arrested for Rae's murder after Silas planted evidence on him. Barlow stated that other characters blamed Brendan because he had caused Rae to fear for her life, and that Ste believed he was culpable because "[a]fter all the ups and downs, Ste knows exactly what the relationship between Rae and Brendan has been like and all the problems they've had."

== Storylines ==
Rae meets Newt (Nico Mirallegro) while he is living rough, and teaches him how to survive on the streets. She is disliked by Eli (Marc Silcock), Newt's alternate persona caused by his schizophrenia. Rae and Newt become close and begin a relationship. After Newt admits he has schizophrenia, Eli takes over his mind and tries to kill Rae, but Newt manages to stop him. Newt and Rae decide to escape their problems by committing suicide together by jumping from a height into water. As they climb to the top of a warehouse to jump, Newt's ex-girlfriend Lauren Valentine (Dominique Jackson) and his foster father Jack Osborne (Jimmy McKenna) rush to stop Newt, who pushes Eli into the canal as Rae jumps. Newt jumps in after them, but is rescued by Jack. After recovering, Newt locates Rae's grandmother Lily (Meryl Hampton) and tells her that her granddaughter is dead. Rae, however, then arrives alive and well. She does not recognise Newt, and has a different hairstyle and clothing from her previous appearances. Newt realises that he had seen a photograph of Rae and had created an alternate persona around her. The woman he thought he had known was another figment of his imagination.

To Rae's displeasure, her school is soon merged with Newt's. She rebuffs his attempts to talk to her, and after gaining employment at the local diner, is further dismayed to find that Newt works there. She tries to have him fired, but eventually accepts that they must work together. After she is locked in a cupboard by Lauren, Rae reveals that she is claustrophobic and believes she is cursed. She tells Newt that both of her sisters died before their 18th birthdays and she believes the same will happen to her. Newt helps Rae to overcome her fear of the curse, and she agrees to move to Scotland with him. However, her grandmother suffers a stroke shortly before her planned departure, so she decides to stay in Hollyoaks to care for her.

Rae grows close to Ste, her employer at the diner, and they begin dating. Brendan Brady is jealous because he is attracted to Ste, and tries to separate them. Brendan and Ste begin sleeping together; he tells Ste to continue seeing Rae so their own relationship can remain a secret. Rae discovers that she is pregnant and Ste promises to support her. Rae considers having an abortion but ultimately decides against it. After catching Brendan and Ste kissing, Rae resolves to raise the baby alone, but suffers a miscarriage after a vicious row with Brendan. Rae threatens to out Brendan to the community, so he retaliates by setting her up and having her arrested as a drug dealer. Rae is released without charge after Warren Fox (Jamie Lomas) tampers with the substance, which is found to be icing sugar.

Rae briefly works as a barmaid at a local pub, but leaves her job after exposing an affair between Gaz Bennett (Joel Goonan) and her boss Heidi Costello (Kim Tiddy). She begins a relationship with Ethan Scott (Craig Vye), unaware that he is also dating Theresa McQueen and Liberty Savage. When the women discover his infidelity, they plot their revenge together. Rae tells Ethan she has an STD, Theresa claims to be pregnant and Liberty pretends to set a wedding date. They then humiliate Ethan with the truth and throw gunge over him in front of the local residents.

When Rae accidentally reveals that Brendan is gay in front of his son, Brendan is furious and threatens to kill her. Rae later tells Silas Blissett (Jeff Rawle) about Brendan's threat, but is unaware that Silas is a serial killer. Rae also reveals that she is tired of men treating her badly, and vows to use them in future. Silas steals Theresa's phone and sends Rae a text message asking to meet her outside. When Rae emerges, Silas repeatedly punches her, then strangles her to death. He places Rae's body in the boot of Brendan's car, framing him. Ste arranges a memorial for her after Brendan is charged with her murder. However, Brendan is later released when Silas is discovered as her killer.

== Reception ==
In 2011, Rae, Ste and Brendan's romance plot won the "Best Love Triangle" accolade at the All About Soap Bubble Awards. Rae's murder earned a nomination for "Spectacular Scene of the Year" at the 2012 British Soap Awards. Holy Soap said that Rae's most memorable moment was being locked in a cupboard and subsequently revealing herself to be cursed. Roz Laws of the Sunday Mercury called Rae's interest in Ste a mystery, noting his violent history and homosexuality as reasons Rae should have avoided him. Anthony D. Langford of AfterElton said that Hollyoaks had no interest in Rae as a character, and no desire to "make her a real fleshed out person". He added that Rae had no common sense because "no woman would regularly leave her man alone for long periods of time with the guy she knows he had an affair with." He also said that Rae should have known that Ste and Brendan's affair had resumed.

Langford later wrote that Rae's murder and the subsequent blaming of Brendan were predictable, but made "compelling drama", and that Rae had been killed in "a rather gruesome and shocking fashion". Inside Soap polled its readers on which Hollyoaks character they most wanted to be murdered by Silas. Rae and Theresa were voted as favourites to survive, while Leanne and Ruby Button (Anna Shaffer) were voted to be his next victims.
