= Mitzeee Minniver =

Fictional character from Hollyoaks

- Hollyoaks character
- Portrayed by: Rachel Shenton
- Duration: 2010–2013
- First appearance: 23 July 2010
- Last appearance: 15 February 2013
- Created by: Paul Marquess
- Introduced by: Paul Marquess
- Spin-off appearances: Hollyoaks Later (2010–2012)
In-universe information
- Other names: Anne Minniver
- Occupation: Glamour model Events manager Businesswoman; Barmaid; Pub Owner
- Father: Mick Minniver
- Mother: Trish Minniver
- Half-sisters: Maxine Minniver
- Sons: Phoenix Costello
- Aunts: Joan Blissett
- Nieces: Minnie Minniver
- First cousins: Heidi Costello; Wendy Blissett
- Other relatives: Riley Costello; Seth Costello; Jason Costello; Bobby Costello

Anne "Mitzeee" Minniver is a fictional character from the British Channel 4 soap opera Hollyoaks, played by Rachel Shenton. The character debuted on-screen during the episode airing on 23 July 2010. Mitzeee was created by series producer Paul Marquess for a different television series which was never commissioned and instead introduced his ideas onto Mitzeee. She is also one of the first characters created in Marquess's 2010 reinvention of Hollyoaks. Mitzeee is a wannabe glamour model and WAG, she is portrayed as being ruthless in achieving her goals and is fame driven. Shenton helped create her backstory and has stated on different occasions that Mitzeee uses femininity to get what she wants. Various media outlets drew comparisons to the character with pop star Cheryl Cole, and Mitzeee spells her career name with triple e's because she finds her name plain, a tag Shenton has also agreed with. On 20 December 2012, it was announced that Shenton had left the show and her final scenes aired on 15 February 2013.

== Creation and casting ==
In January 2010, it was announced that Lucy Allan had stepped down from the position of series producer and that Paul Marquess had taken over the role. It was soon revealed that Marquess planned to give Hollyoaks a "shake up". In April 2010 it was announced that a series of new characters would debut following the departures of old ones. Among them was Mitzeee, she was originally billed as a "wannabe glamour model". Marquess later revealed to Inside Soap that he had previously created the character for a different series that had never been commissioned and decided to incorporate her into Hollyoaks.

It was later announced that actress Rachel Shenton had been cast in the role. Shenton described the character as being the complete opposite of her. Shenton had previously auditioned for a role in Hollyoaks but was not successful. Speaking of her audition for Mitzeee, Shenton stated during an interview with entertainment website Digital Spy: "This role came up and I thought, 'Yep, brilliant - this is a good time to do this.' For Hollyoaks, it's a time of change. Paul has a great reputation and it felt like a really good time to do this." Shenton also credits herself in the creation of Mitzeee's backstory. Shenton conducted research into the type of character Mitzeee is, and how the backstory would make her act how she does in the present. Before the character had appeared on-screen Shenton received media attention for her image, with tabloids reporting on her likeness to Cheryl Cole and branded it as an attempt to 'sex up' the serial. Shenton described the attention and comparisons as "very flattering". In August 2011, of her future in the role Shenton said "I won't be going anywhere for a while. Mitzeee's such a great character to play."

== Development ==
=== Characterisation ===
Lime Pictures publicity describe Mitzeee as a "21-year-old aspiring glamour model [...] she has a few big secrets up her sleeve [...] likely to cause havoc in the village, and break many hearts along the way!" Mitzeee was also billed to Shenton as an aspiring model who wanted a better life and desperately wanted the lifestyle of the rich and famous. At the time of her arrival Shenton praised her stating: "I think that's really current because there are so many people, particularly young girls, who really want that and it is their goal." Shenton also claimed that the more viewers get to know Mitzeee the more they will realise she isn't as one-dimensional as she first seems. Shenton also described her adding: "She hides her intelligence well but she's actually a very intelligent girl. She's also quite manipulative and vindictive and some would say you have to be quite intelligent to do that! That's Mitzeee - there's definitely layers." She is also described as doing whatever to get where she wants to be and being quite ruthless in the process." Mitzeee is also popular with males, she often uses this to get what she wants. Mitzeee does not crave this attention, with Shenton stating "I think she's far too shrewd for that. She uses the attention to get what she wants and uses her femininity to get where she wants to be. I don't think for a second she's taken in by anything. She uses it as a tool, really." She has also been described as "fame-hungry" and a "gossip".

Mitzeee's real name is 'Anne Minniver' and Shenton once said that the name sounded plain. On-screen she goes by her career name of Mitzeee, which is spelled with three "E's" - a spelling she makes a point of regularly in episodes. Of this, Shenton explains: "She says it to so many people, 'It's Mitzeee with three es', and she makes a point of it. It's slightly ridiculous as well and I think Mitzeee's a bit of an alter ego so she's having a bit of fun with it." Shenton also commented on the response she has been given from fans about the character: "I've been really, really pleased. I've had such a positive reaction to the role, which I was a little bit shocked about! I wasn't quite sure how people would take her, because I thought she'd be a Marmite kind of character where you either love her or you hate her! But everyone's reactions have been so lovely, and people seem to like her! I'm really grateful for the reactions I've received from the Hollyoaks fans." She also made references to Mitzeee's upbringing, and claimed that viewers would see a "different side" to the character during the third series of Hollyoaks Later.

=== Stalker and prison life ===
In April 2012, Mitzeee starts to receive disturbing gifts due to her celebrity status. Neil Cooper (Tosin Cole) eventually admits to being her admirer but the strange gifts continue, leaving Mitzeee worried and paranoid. Mitzeee makes a live television debut and she accuses one of the guests of being her stalker, leading to her being dismissed. Mercedes McQueen (Jennifer Metcalfe) is later revealed to be Mitzeee's stalker and she continues to terrorize Mitzeee. Mercedes begins to grow bored and begins to stop but when she discovers that Mitzeee and ex-boyfriend Riley Costello (Rob Norbury) are in a relationship, Mercedes targets Mitzeee once again. A frantic Mitzeee accuses everyone of laughing at her but she is told she is mad. Mitzeee returns to her flat and Mercedes arrives to check she is ok when an extremely unstable Mitzeee brandishes a large kitchen knife, accusing Mercedes of being the stalker. Shenton said of this: "Mitzeee definitely has no idea that it's Mercedes - in fact, Mercedes is probably the last person that she'd suspect. She actually thinks that it's Lynsey and accuses her, because it seems to make sense." Mercedes overpowers Mitzeee and knocks her unconscious before she stabs herself, making it seem that Mitzeee has stabbed her. Of the aftermath of the stabbing, Shenton said "Mitzeee is petrified and picks up a knife in the kitchen. The next thing you know, Mitzeee wakes up after being unconscious due to the tablets and the wine. The first thing she sees is Mercedes with a stab wound and there is blood everywhere. Mitzeee doesn't have a clue whether she could have stabbed Mercedes, or if someone else came into the flat and did it." Mitzeee is later arrested and held in custody.

Mitzeee struggles in prison as she is tormented by other prisoners and Myra McQueen (Nicole Barber-Lane) is later transferred to Mitzeee's prison. Myra is convinced that Mitzeee stabbed her daughter and uses this opportunity to get revenge. Shenton told All About Soap: "I think at that point Mitzeee just wonders if things could get any worse for her. She's already having a really rough time, and then Myra shows up. It's a very calculated decision on Myra's part to get moved to the same jail. Myra will battle tooth and nail for her daughter, and you can just imagine the fighting spirit she has. There's a lot of serious verbal scrapping between Myra and Mitzeee, which in some ways is worse than a punch-up." Shenton also said that Riley is not as supportive as Mitzeee would like him to be as he is dealing with his own problems back in the village. She added that it's devastating for Mitzeee as she is madly in love with Riley and hopes that he will have a change of heart. Shenton said in September 2012 that Mitzeee will play a big role in the fifth series of Hollyoaks Later. Speaking to Inside Soap, Shenton revealed "So many horrible things have happened to Mitzeee - she's so far removed from the girl she was six months ago. This whole chain of events sends her into an even deeper depression. Her mum comes to visit her in jail, and that's the first point viewers will see something's really not quite right with Mitzeee now." She later added that Mitzeee's recent experiences will "change her for the good" and she will come out fighting. Shenton said that all of the latest trouble's in Mitzeee's life has ruled out any possibility of returning to her "glamour past" and that being framed for attempted murder has "hardened her". Speaking to a Daily Star reporter, Shenton said that "When she first arrived a year ago, she was this ditzy glamour model with big hair. Now you've seen a different side to her. I think this has changed her forever. I'd like to see her go back to a version of herself but I don't think you can ever go right back when something like this has happened."

=== Departure ===
On 20 December 2012 Shenton announced via social networking site Twitter that she would be departing the role in February 2013. Commenting on her exit, Shenton said: "Mitzeee's final week is not to be missed [...] I've had an amazing two years playing Mitzeee (with three e's). She's been on an incredible journey that's not over yet. It's been an absolute privilege to work with the cast and crew that make Hollyoaks such a special place. This has been one of the hardest decisions I've made, but I feel it's time for Mitzeee and myself to move onto pastures new". Shenton revealed that she had known she was going to leave Hollyoaks for over a year but that she had only decided that she would definitely leave six months prior to her exit.

It was announced that Eamonn Holmes would appear in a guest role for Shenton's exit and that Carl Costello (Paul Opacic) would also return for the storyline. It was revealed that Shenton's exit storyline would feature Carl returning to seek justice for Riley's death and that he would enlist Mitzeee in helping him punish Walker (Neil Newbon). An official statement by Hollyoaks teased the character's exit, saying: "Mitzeee and Eamonn's collaboration is a must-see and marks Rachel Shenton's departure from the show. However, it remains to be seen whether Mitzeee will get a happy ending away from Hollyoaks, or if her involvement with Carl has put her life in danger". Daniel Kilkelly of Digital Spy reported that Mitzeee and Maxine would both believe that they are pregnant by the same man which would lead to Mitzeee's discovery that she is pregnant, but not by the man she suspects of being the father.

During Mitzeee's exit Carl tells her he has planned for Walker to be killed by a hitman, leaving her in "total shock" as she does not expect Carl to take that course of action. Mitzeee initially decides that she does not want anything to do with Carl's plan although she later changes her mind. Mitzeee also discovers that she may pregnant, which Shenton said shocked her. During the scenes both Mitzeee and Maxine believe that they could be pregnant and take tests, with one of the tests showing a positive result. The actress said that she initially thought that Maxine would have the positive pregnancy test but when she discovered that Mitzeee would discover she is pregnant, she thought: "Oh my God, this is amazing - what more can this girl have to deal with?!' I was really interested to see how she would handle it". Shenton said that she found her final scenes difficult to film due to their intense nature and as some scenes did not require her to cry although she found herself becoming emotional. She added that she was pleased with her exit storyline which she had no influence over and instead left completely to the writers as she wanted "to see how Mitzeee's journey went" for herself. She explained that when she was told of Mitzeee's exit storyline she felt it was "just perfect" as it was "just so fitting" and it contained "every single emotion into that last week". Shenton opined that during her time on Hollyoaks Mitzeee had begun to feel almost "like a very good friend, as odd as that sounds! I really cared about her, and I think her two-year journey has been so full of different emotions". She said that she would like Mitzeee to be remembered "for everything that she is. I think she's definitely proved three-dimensional, and she's now a different person to who she was in the first few episodes". Her final scenes aired on 15 February 2013.

== Storylines ==
=== Backstory ===
Mitzeee grew up with her mother Trish Minniver (Paula Wolfenden/Denise Welch), a single mother, and sister Maxine (Nikki Sanderson). She did not see her extended family, the Costellos, for a lengthy period of time. Mitzeee came to know that her cousin had an affair with her mother's boyfriend, resulting in the couple splitting up. Mitzeee then decided to be with him whilst on a night out and they had a passionate one-night stand so she seeks Heidi to resume her plan of revenge. Mitzeee has also done lads' mag photo shoots and other PA activities before arriving on screen.

=== 2010–2013 ===
Mitzeee first arrives as a PA for The Loft promotion and rapidly befriends Darren Osborne (Ashley Taylor Dawson), Rhys Ashworth (Andrew Moss) and Duncan Button (Dean Aspen). It soon becomes clear to see that she was involved in an affair with Carl Costello (Paul Opacic) and wants to pursue a relationship. The situation's complication worsens upon identifying herself as Carl's wife Heidi Costello's (Kim Tiddy) cousin. Mitzeee attempts to entice Carl by seducing him. However, this fails occasionally as Carl consistently rejects her. Mitzeee causes trouble for Carl as she tells him all about his daughter Jasmine Costello's (Victoria Atkin) relationship with Bart McQueen (Jonny Clarke). This causes tension and hostility upon Carl's confrontation with him. Despite that, Mitzeee still creates chaos for him and again, endeavours to sleep with him. Whilst at home with her mother Trish, it is revealed that Carl and Trish were dating before Heidi started an affair with Carl. Mitzeee is certain that she will avenge Heidi and Carl's betrayal. Mitzeee assists Heidi in a fashion show while continuing to seduce Carl but Carl rejects her further. She enlists the help of Michaela McQueen (Hollie-Jay Bowes) to help her expose their affair. Michaela is hesitant initially however she succumbs, exposing the affair publicly. Heidi later forgives Carl and Mitzeee confesses that Carl's past with Trish forced the expose. Duncan later gives Mitzeee a driving lesson but the car unexpectedly breaks down in the countryside and they spend the night in the car. Duncan afterwards spreads a rumour that he had sex with Mitzeee in the car, using a signed photo as evidence.

Mitzeee convinces Riley Costello (Rob Norbury) to let her attend a cage fighting party and an after-party at a footballer's house with him. She takes Nancy Hayton (Jessica Fox), who has agreed to write an article on the night, and heavily pregnant Theresa McQueen (Jorgie Porter) with her. During the party, she teaches Theresa and Nancy how to be a WAG, and ends up fighting with "frenemy" Chanterelle (Leanne Urey). Mitzeee makes many failed attempts at seducing footballers and is jealous over Theresa's romance with Logan Fairhurst (Thomas Sean Hughes). She attacks Theresa, who then goes into labour. She visits Theresa in the hospital while she's giving birth but she screams at her to get out, saying she wants Nancy in the room instead. Mitzeee opens up to Nancy in the hospital about her life claiming she had no option of being the way she is. Nancy sympathises and agrees to write a nicer article on her. Mitzeee is angry with Nancy when she sees the paper have twisted her article however becomes happier when people start to recognise her because of it. Carl's daughter, Jem Costello (Helen Russell-Clark), pays Mitzeee to seduce Carl however, instead, Jem's boyfriend, Liam McAllister (Chris Overton) almost has sex with Mitzeee, caught by Heidi and Jem, as she doesn't want Jem to have anything more to do with Liam. In early 2011, Mitzeee catches Brendan Brady (Emmett J. Scanlan) kissing Ste Hay (Kieron Richardson), and uses this information to blackmail Brendan into becoming her manager and making her famous. He organises a photoshoot for her, but during this, a sleazy photographer takes advantage of Mitzeee, however, Brendan teams up with Warren Fox (Jamie Lomas) and gets revenge on the photographer. Mitzeee implies to Brendan's close friends that they are now an item, a term Brendan is not happy with, but goes along with. Mitzeee ensures Ste's girlfriend Rae Wilson (Alice Barlow) witnesses Brendan and Ste's passion.

Brendan is angered by her actions however pretends to be her boyfriend after she explains she did not enjoy the pair's betrayal of Rae. Mitzeee clashes with Brendan's sister Cheryl Brady (Bronagh Waugh). In March 2011, Brendan helps Mitzeee to impersonate Cheryl Cole. Mitzeee manages to deceive the resident of Hollyoaks including Cheryl, but she realises it was Mitzeee and attacks her before they dispute. When Mitzeee's mother, Trish, is imprisoned, Ethan Scott (Craig Vye) agrees to release her if she gets a confession from Warren admitting to the murder of Louise Summers (Roxanne McKee). She attempts to tape record him however Warren finds out. Warren ends up confessing to Mitzeee about Louise's murder. Mitzeee gets an interview for a job in London and after Warren refuses to give her money for an outfit, she takes his money from Chez Chez and spends it at Cincerity. She is later arrested and told the money is from a bank heist. She realises the money has fallen into Warren's hands and tells Ethan the location of the money. Before the club can be raided she steals the rest of the money. She tells Warren she lost the interview because of him and later burns the money in front of him in retaliation. Mitzeee invites herself to Riley's stag week to keep an eye on Warren but continues to grow close to Riley as the week progresses. Warren discovers that Mercedes Fisher (Jennifer Metcalfe) is having an affair with Carl and wants to blackmail them for money, but Mitzeee is concerned for Riley. Nevertheless, when Carl uninvites Mitzeee from the wedding she aids Warren in his blackmail by writing about the affair in her book but later feels guilty when Heidi re-invites her. Mercedes reveals the affair herself and Mitzeee tries to comfort Riley.

When Heidi is murdered by her father, Silas Blissett (Jeff Rawle), Mitzeee hides her upset by looking after the Costello children. Subsequently, she breaks up with Warren, who gets revenge on her by dumping her clothes in a pond. Unknown of who he is Warren's son Joel Dexter (Andrew Still) helps Mitzeee get her clothes out of the pond. When she finds out who he is she confronts Warren to ask him, Warren tells her he does not believe that Joel is his son but later agrees to have a DNA test, the results turn out true. Later on Mitzeee begins plotting against Warren with Brendan, Mitzeee, Warren and Joel later leave and go to Paris. They return a few weeks later they return and find Nancy and Darren in their flat, Nancy later tells Mitzeee she has found the letter she had given her back in May, but said she had thrown it away, but had in fact kept it. Warren surprises Mitzeee by organising a trip for them to go to Las Vegas and to get married on Christmas Day. Mitzeee plays along even though she is terrified inside. Brendan comforts Mitzeee and Joel walks in on them. Joel tells Warren about this and Warren takes his anger out on Mitzeee. Joel separates them and tells Warren that he will not touch her again. Mitzeee runs out of the apartment, crying and Nancy opens the letter that Mitzeee wrote, which states that if she dies, Warren will have been responsible for it. Brendan sees the marks that Warren has left and runs to attack him for it Joel and Mitzeee break up the fight and Mitzeee is left feeling awkward in the middle of it. Warren talks to Theresa about everything and she tells him to have a calm conversation with Mitzeee. Warren goes to the apartment to find the safety chain across. Mitzeee raises the suggestion that maybe Warren is not over Louise and he should his peace with her and then the two of them can start their life together. Warren tells her he needs time to think and Mitzeee leaves.

Mitzeee mulls things over that night and tells Brendan she is leaving. Mitzeee realises she has to go back to the apartment to get her passport and informs Nancy about her leaving. Warren over hears and questions Mitzeee about her leaving and asks to talk to her inside. Warren agrees to take her to Louise's grave however on the way when Warren stops to change a tire and Mitzeee realises that she doesn't have her phone which gives Brendan access to where she is protecting her from an unknown disappearance. Warren's phone rings and Mitzeee tries to reach it however Warren bats her hand away and ignores it. He starts the car again and stops in the middle of nowhere and Warren tells Mitzeee he knows about her going behind his back he then grabs her arm and drags her out the car. Mitzeee starts crying and begging Warren to let her go and that she would never betray him. He chucks her on the dirt on top of where Louise is buried and sticks a spade in the ground and forces her to dig. Warren checks his phone and realises that he has missed calls from Theresa. He calls her back and tells her that Mitzeee is busy at the moment. Mitzeee thinks about running away but Warren puts the idea out of her mind by pointing a gun at her. Mitzeee continues to dig until she says to Warren she can't do it anymore and he pushes her into the hole she has just dug and asks her could the grave accommodate another person and attempts to strangle her and Mitzeee realises she is about to die. Brendan arrives to save the day and Warren attacks him. Mitzeee searches desperately for the gun Brendan had. Warren starts kicking Brendan who was on the floor. Warren gets very close to killing Brendan however Joel arrives and hits Warren over the head with a spade.

The police arrive arrest Warren and he insults Mitzeee. Days after the attack Mitzeee still bares bruises and starts realising the full consequence of what she has done and what could happen if Warren gets off. Nancy tells her not to think about the past - only the present. On Valentine's Day, Mitzeee receives a card to find that Joel has returned to Hollyoaks. Riley invites Mitzeee to attend an awards evening with him. A paparazzo photographs them together, while Riley is touching Mitzeee's face. At Riley's son Bobby's christening, Mercedes slaps Mitzeee. While they are in the car park, Riley and Mitzeee share a passionate kiss. To cut the tension in the flat, Mitzeee invites Darren and Nancy to move in while the pub undergoes a renovation. Mitzeee is interviewed by a journalist for an online blog. He tells her that he is only there because his company is now in association with her management. Riley asks Mitzeee pull the interview and she agrees, however, it is later published. Someone starts sending Mitzeee gifts and she discovers that it was Neil Cooper (Tosin Cole), who has a crush on her. Mitzeee continues to receive gifts and anonymous phone calls and discovers that the culprit is not Neil. Mitzeee appears in live TV and lashes out at a fan, incorrectly thinking she is behind the gifts. She is later sacked and is told she will never appear on TV again. Mitzeee continues to get creepy gifts when it is revealed that Mercedes is Mitzeee's stalker because Mercedes believes that Mitzeee and Riley are going out. Mitzeee is still in love with Riley when she gets a modelling gig to model for the grand prix. She asks Riley whether she should go and he says she should and so she does hoping that she can forget about Riley. When Mercedes begins messing with Mitzeee's mind, playing games and hiding things in her flat, Mitzeee begins to lose grip on reality and begins taking some new tablets for anxiety. During a confrontation with Mercedes, Mitzeee is knocked unconscious and Mercedes stabs herself in the stomach and lies that Mitzeee stabbed her. After trying to escape the country and failing, Mitzeee is arrested on suspicion of GBH and she is imprisoned awaiting trial. While in prison, Mitzeee is bullied by her cellmate and a gang of girls who demand Riley's money or they will kill her. Mitzeee asks Riley for £5,000, to which he reluctantly accepts and gives them the money. Coincidentally, Mercedes' mother Myra McQueen (Nicole Barber-Lane) is also in prison at the same time as Mitzeee, and warns her that she will pay for "stabbing" Mercedes.

Mitzeee, alongside cellmate Lauren, escape prison when being transferred to a psychiatric unit. Nancy helps Mitzeee. Lauren decides to return to prison. Mitzeee visits Riley and they have sex. Riley intends to call off his engagement to Mercedes. Bobby goes missing and Mercedes accuses Mitzeee of kidnapping him. It is revealed that Mercedes had taken Bobby. When Mercedes threatens to kill herself and Bobby, Riley is forced to phone Mitzeee and tell her he no longer loves her. Mitzeee is distraught but is later surprised when Riley returns to the village looking for her. Riley is accidentally shot by Walker. Mitzeee phones for an ambulance and is subsequently arrested. She is able to visit Riley in hospital and is devastated as he dies with her at his bedside. Mitzeee is arrested following Riley's death and Carl visits her in prison where she tells him the charges for attempted murder will be dropped but she will still be charged with escaping prison. Mitzeee is later released and returns to the village. Mitzeee's sister, Maxine Minniver (Nikki Sanderson), who had previously stolen Mitzeee's fiancé Gary, arrives in the village. Mitzeee is angry at Maxine's arrival and slaps her. Mitzeee discovers that Riley left The Dog in the Pond public house to her in his will. Maxine apologises to Mitzeee and pays the tenants on Mitzeee's old flat to move out. Mitzeee forgives Maxine and they move in together. At Mercedes' trial, Mercedes' lawyer Jim McGinn (Dan Tetsell) suggests Riley was abusive towards Mercedes and stabbed her. He also suggests that Riley killed Lynsey. Mercedes backs up Jim's claims. Mitzeee gives evidence although admits she can not be certain that Mercedes stabbed herself or knocked her out as she was unconscious. Mitzeee pleas with Mercedes to tell the truth although she does not. The jury give a not guilty verdict and Mercedes is released.

In Mitzeee's final week in Hollyoaks, Carl returns and explains he wants to kill Simon Walker (Neil Newbon) in revenge for killing Riley the year prior. At first Mitzeee refuses to help but later agrees to help Carl in his plans. Mitzeee later discovers that she is five months pregnant with Riley's baby, much to her delight after thinking it was Tyson's. Mitzeee then attends a live broadcast on Sky News with Eamonn Holmes and tells Carl about the news while he is in a hotel preparing to kill Walker. Carl is filled with joy, but still goes after Walker to kill him. The next day, it turns out Carl did not kill Walker but felt like he should have done. He then tells her he must leave Hollyoaks to prevent him from going through with this plans to get rid of Walker once and for all and he asks Mitzeee to join him. She considers and then agrees to it and after an emotional farewell with Maxine and Nancy, she and Carl depart Hollyoaks to live in America and look after Riley's children, escaping Walkers evil plans. Shortly after leaving, Mitzeee decides to sell The Dog, leaving the Osbournes distraught until they find the money to buy it. Maxine later gets a text from Mitzeee telling her she had a baby boy named Phoenix.

In July 2016, Mitzeee calls Maxine to tell her not to trust Warren, after what he has done to her. In July 2017, Mercedes receives a letter from Mitzeee stating that Bobby wants her to adopt him and, after initially agreeing to sign the documents, Mercedes changes her mind and travels to America to stay with Carl and Mitzeee in the hopes that Bobby can be a part of her life. Two years later in 2019, Maxine decide to stay with Mitzeee along with her daughter Minnie while she recovers from Munchausen syndrome.

== Reception ==
During the character's duration she became one of Hollyoaks "most popular characters". Shenton was nominated in the category of "Sexiest Female" at the 2011 British Soap Awards. At the 2011 Inside Soap Awards Shenton was nominated for Best Newcomer and Funniest Performance. She was then nominated in the category of "Serial Drama Performance" at the 2012 National Television Awards. At the 2012 Inside Soap Awards Shenton was nominated for "Best Actress", "Best Bitch" and "Sexiest Female".
