= Ruby Button =

Fictional character from Hollyoaks

- Hollyoaks character
- Portrayed by: Anna Shaffer
- Duration: 2011–2014, 2017–2018
- First appearance: 3 January 2011
- Last appearance: 30 April 2018
- Introduced by: Paul Marquess (2010); Bryan Kirkwood (2017, 2018)
In-universe information
- Occupation: Student
- Brothers: Duncan Button

Ruby Button is a fictional character from the British Channel 4 soap opera Hollyoaks, played by Anna Shaffer. Shaffer's casting was announced in December 2010 and it was revealed that Ruby would be introduced as the sister of Duncan Button (Dean Aspen). Shaffer originally auditioned for the role of Leanne Holiday, in which she was not successful. Shaffer began filming her scenes in late 2010 and relocated to Liverpool for filming. Ruby made her first appearance in the episode broadcast on 3 January 2011. In October 2013, it was announced that Shaffer had quit the role and would leave in February 2014. In October 2017, speculation emerged indicating Shaffer was to reprise the role very soon and on 16 November 2017, it was confirmed that Ruby would be back for Frankie Osborne's (Helen Pearson) funeral later that month. She returned on 23 November 2017, departing in the following episode, broadcast on 24 November. She made another return for a guest stint at the end of April 2018, making her final appearance on 30 April.

Ruby was initially described as "sneaky" and likely to cause mayhem at Duncan's expense. Ruby is a tearaway and "occupies herself with tormenting others" including her best friend, Esther Bloom (Jazmine Franks). Ruby is illiterate and the official Hollyoaks website describe this as her "Achilles heel". However, Ruby does not let her illiteracy stop her causing trouble. The character has also been called a "bitchy schoolgirl" and sharp-tongued. Series producer, Emma Smithwick, said she wants the character of Ruby to be "more full and not two-dimensional". Ruby's storylines have often focused on her various relationships and "bitchy" ways. Ruby engages in a brief relationship with Duncan's best friend, Ricky Campbell (Ashley Margolis), which ends when Ricky sees Ruby bullying others. Ruby also becomes best friends with Esther and Sinead O'Connor (Stephanie Davis). A prominent storyline for Ruby saw her reveal her illiteracy and subsequently develop feelings for her tutor, Pete Hamill (Peter Mitchell). Ruby's behaviour soon begins to "spiral out of control" and she claims to have had sex with older man, Riley Costello (Rob Norbury). She later embarks on relationships with Jono (Dylan Llewellyn) and Ziggy Roscoe (Fabrizio Santino), and becomes embroiled in the bullying of Esther as well as suffering a heart attack.

== Development ==
=== Casting and characterisation ===
"When I first auditioned, I think I was reading for the part of Leanne Holiday. It was nerve-wracking because they were filming it, and there were five people in the room. I just remember being very nervous, and really scared that the script would start shaking as I was holding it. I think I played it a bit cooler than I was actually feeling!"

— Shaffer on the audition process (2011)

In December 2010, the Liverpool Echo reported that eighteen-year-old Shaffer would be joining the cast of Hollyoaks as Ruby, the sister of Duncan Button (Dean Aspen). Shaffer originally auditioned for the role of Leanne Holiday, but she was later cast as Ruby. Shaffer relocated to Liverpool, where Hollyoaks is filmed, for the role. She began filming her scenes in late 2010. Shaffer made her first on-screen appearance as Ruby in the episode broadcast on 3 January 2011. In May 2011, it was speculated that Shaffer would be leaving Hollyoaks. However, this was denied and a show spokesperson told Digital Spy "We don't want to spoil the storylines for the viewers, however we can confirm that Anna Shaffer is with Hollyoaks for the foreseeable future."

Ruby was initially described as "sneaky" and likely to "cause mayhem at the expense of [Duncan]". The official Hollyoaks website described Ruby as a "tearaway". They dubbed her the "Rubester" and said she "occupies herself with tormenting others" including her best friend, Esther Bloom (Jazmine Franks). Ruby is illiterate, which is her "Achilles heel". However, she does not let her illiteracy stop her causing trouble. Digital Spy called Ruby a "bitchy schoolgirl" who is sharp-tongued. Series producer, Emma Smithwick, said she wants the character of Ruby to be "more full and not two-dimensional". Shaffer told OK Extra that Ruby is a "tart with a heart", but finds it hard to trust people. She said "[Ruby] has deep-seated insecurities and she feels quite lonely."

=== Illiteracy and school girl crush ===
In May 2011, it was revealed that Ruby is illiterate. Ruby gets her friend, Sinead O'Connor (Stephanie Davis) to write a love letter from their friend, Esther Bloom (Jazmine Franks), to teaching assistant, Amy Barnes (Ashley Slanina-Davies). Shaffer told a columnist from Inside Soap that Ruby and Sinead "come up with all this ridiculous, over-the-top stuff" and put up copies of the letter around school. Amy discovers what Ruby and Sinead have done and asks them to write apology letters to Esther. Shaffer explained that Ruby seems worried and does everything she can to get out of writing the letter. Explaining the situation, Shaffer told Inside Soap [...] "Sinead realises that it's not because Ruby doesn't want to write the letter - it's because she can't". Esther discovers Ruby's illiteracy and decides to help. Esther's grandmother, Frankie Osborne (Helen Pearson), learns of Ruby's treatment of Esther and threatens to throw her out. However, Esther convinces Frankie to let Ruby stay when she reveals her illiteracy. Esther also tells their school headteacher, Pete Hamill (Peter Mitchell). Shaffer opined that Ruby is grateful to Esther as Ruby "wouldn't have the guts". The actress added that it was "nice" to see Ruby's vulnerability, but said it would not last.

Pete organises a tutor, Colin Grimshaw (Michael Mears), to teach Ruby to read and write. Ruby assumes that Pete will be tutoring her. She has feelings for him and thinks they are reciprocated. Shaffer said that Ruby is "gutted" when she learns that Colin will be tutoring her. Ruby tries to make their lessons "as difficult as possible". The other students post a photo of Ruby and Colin inside a love heart on the classroom board which leaves Ruby "absolutely mortified". Shaffer opined that people may sympathise with Ruby. She said "Instead of thinking about what a bitch [Ruby] is, the viewers might start to realise that she's actually just a lost little girl." Ruby "winds up" Colin in their lessons and she does not think that he will retaliate. Ruby tells Pete that Colin touched her inappropriately. However, Pete convinces Ruby that Colin was only trying to comfort her. Pete tells Ruby that Colin will continue to tutor her. Ruby verbally abuses Colin and he slaps her. Pete sees this and suspends Colin. Ruby uses the situation to her advantage and "revels" in the attention. Pete then offers to be Ruby's new tutor. In August 2011, Ruby kisses Pete during one of their study sessions. Ruby kisses Pete after she accidentally spills a drink on him. Shaffer said that Ruby and Pete are "physically close" and she decides to be spontaneous. Pete is "horrified" and rebuffs her advances. Shaffer revealed that Ruby is hurt by this as she had convinced herself that her feelings were reciprocated by Pete. He then tells her that he is going to find a replacement tutor.

=== Rebellious behaviour ===
In May 2011, it was reported that she would soon "spiral out of control". Ruby plans to host a party as Frankie and Jack Osborne (Jimmy McKenna) are on holiday. However, Jack asks his son, Darren (Ashley Taylor Dawson) and Darren's girlfriend, Nancy Hayton (Jessica Fox), to babysit Ruby whilst they are away. Darren and Nancy discover Ruby's plans and put a stop to them. Shaffer explained that Ruby sees Frankie and Jack being away as the "perfect" opportunity to make some mischief. However, Ruby underestimates Nancy, who poses as her on a social networking website and cancels the party. Ruby is "furious" and decides to run away. She stands "sexily" at the side of the road trying to hitch a lift out of the village. Ruby is pleased when Riley Costello (Rob Norbury) and Doug Carter (PJ Brennan) offer her a lift and she introduces herself as Alicia. She then joins them on their night out. Doug flirts with Ruby and Shaffer said that "Ruby being Ruby then thinks it would be a good idea to head back to his flat". Ruby and Doug kiss, but she passes out as she is not used to drinking "so much" alcohol. Doug decides to take her home and looks for her mobile phone to call one of her friends. However, he finds her student identification and discovers her real age. Doug tells Riley and as they panic, Ruby wakes up and realises that they are talking about her. She "freaks out" and unable to find her own top, takes Riley's football training top before secretly leaving. Doug and Riley are "frantic" when they realise Ruby has gone. They later find her "worse for wear" and covered in her own sick. They return her home to Frankie after getting their story straight. Later, Ruby realises who the training top belongs to and Shaffer said that she sees it as an opportunity to cause more trouble. Ruby lies to Esther, telling her that she had sex with Riley.

Of Ruby's lie, a Hollyoaks insider told the Daily Star "As far as [Riley and Doug are] concerned that's the end of it. But for Ruby the fun has just begun." They added that Ruby is "one seriously mixed-up girl" and it is not long before her lie begins to spread. Ruby tells her friends that she had sex with Riley and the rumour begins to spread around the village. Riley's fiancé, Mercedes McQueen (Jennifer Metcalfe), hears the rumour and is angry with Ruby. The Daily Star reported that Ruby is left "red-faced" after Mercedes confronts her. Mercedes tells Ruby that she must confess to making the lie up.

=== Relationship with Jono ===
In December 2011, it was announced that Ruby would begin a relationship with Jono (Dylan Llewellyn). Jono attends Ruby's sixteenth birthday party and the other guests do not arrive. Shaffer said that Ruby is "over the moon" with Jono's presence. Ruby sees Jono as a "cool sixth-former" and she asks him out. Jono accepts and they enjoy a romantic evening at the cinema. However, they are both nervous and Shaffer said that Ruby is anxious and has "first date jitters". Shaffer explained that Jono's worries are caused by his lack of experience with women. The actress called Ruby and Jono's encounter "awkward yet very sweet". Shaffer added that the storyline would see a "nicer side" of Ruby emerge, which she opined was great. She said "We're going to see their relationship blossom - it'll be a rocky ride, but I've got my fingers crossed!". The official Hollyoaks website referred to the couple by the portmanteau "Juby".

The pair continue to see each other and their relationship becomes serious. Shaffer told a writer from Inside Soap that Ruby has "really fallen for Jono" and that while they have had their share of problems - a "proper attraction" remains between them. However, Jono is embarrassed because Ruby is still in school; Shaffer explained that he ensures that their dates happen when no one else is present. He does like her, but "it is taking a while to get there". Ruby is sure of what she wants and she invites him over for sex - but their encounter causes them to feel more awkward around one another. Shaffer added that Ruby and Jono's romance would continue to develop over time and said that it would have plenty of "drama in store for both of them".

=== Departure ===
On 31 October 2013, it was confirmed that Shaffer had decided to leave Hollyoaks. A show spokesperson revealed that Shaffer's final scenes as Ruby will air in early 2014. It was also confirmed that Ruby's on-off relationship with Ziggy Roscoe (Fabrizio Santino) would face "more twists and turns" in the following weeks. In her later storylines, Ruby bought cocaine from Trevor Royle (Greg Wood) and suffered a heart attack after taking it.

== Reception ==
In August 2011, Inside Soap conducted a poll to find out which Hollyoaks character reader's most wanted to be murdered by serial killer, Silas Blissett (Jeff Rawle). Ruby came second, receiving 21% of the vote. Smithwick told Digital Spy that she "really like[s]" Shaffer. Sarah Ellis of Inside Soap said that Jono was a bad boyfriend to Ruby and that she should have ended their relationship.
