= Duncan Button =

Fictional character from Hollyoaks

- Hollyoaks character
- Portrayed by: Dean Aspen
- Duration: 2009–2011, 2013
- First appearance: 2 November 2009
- Last appearance: 11 October 2013
- Created by: Lucy Allan
- Spin-off appearances: Hollyoaks Later (2011, 2013)
In-universe information
- Occupation: Student (2009–2011); Smoothie maker (2011−2013); Soldier (2013−)
- Sisters: Ruby Button

Duncan Button is a fictional character from the British Channel 4 soap opera Hollyoaks, played by Dean Aspen. He debuted on-screen in the episode airing on 2 November 2009. Duncan was originally credited as Duncan Smith until he was credited as Button. In May 2011, it was announced that Aspen had quit his role and Duncan departed the series on 11 November 2011. Aspen reprised his role as Duncan for the sixth series of Hollyoaks Later in October 2013.

== Character creation and casting ==
In July 2009, at the Hollyoaks Press Day series producer Lucy Allan revealed that a mysterious character called Duncan would arrive in the village. In October 2009, it was revealed that Duncan would be the godson of established characters Neville (Jim Millea) and Suzanne Ashworth (Suzanne Hall). In the same month it was announced that Hollyoaks series producer Lucy Allan had cast television newcomer Dean Aspen in the role of Duncan. To prepare for the role, Aspen revealed that he has to shave every day, as well as having to put on a stone and a half in weight.

In January 2010, it was announced that Lucy Allan had stepped down from the position of series producer and that Paul Marquess had taken over the role. It was soon revealed that Marquess planned to give Hollyoaks a "shake up", changing the production team and beginning a cast cull by axing three established characters – Neville, Suzanne and Josh Ashworth (Sonny Flood). As well as the axings, Emma Rigby who played Hannah had chosen to quit the previous year, bowing out in February 2010. However, it was revealed that the character of Duncan would remain in the series after the Ashworth's departure along with Rhys Ashworth (Andrew Moss), the family's eldest son.

In May 2011 it was announced that Aspen had decided to leave the serial in order to pursue other projects. Discussing his departure Aspen said: "I have had an absolutely brilliant time playing Duncan – I feel like Hollyoaks have paid me to laugh, but, after two years, I really feel the time is right for a new challenge."

In September 2013, it was revealed through spoiler pictures that Aspen had reprised his role as Duncan for the sixth series of Hollyoaks Later, which would air during early October. It was shown that Duncan would be training in the army alongside central character, Louie McQueen (Bryan Parry) as his cousin and Duncan's friend Theresa McQueen (Jorgie Porter) visits them.

== Character development ==
In an interview with entertainment website Digital Spy speaking of Duncan's friendship with fellow teenager Ricky Campbell (Ashley Margolis), Lucy Allan said, "Ahh, Duncan and Ricky! I love them. If you look at who Max [Cunningham] (Matt Littler) and O.B. (Darren Jeffries) were when they were teenagers... They had an innocence and a naïvety to them that the show was lacking at the time. I actually wrote Max and O.B.'s storylines when they were youngsters and they spent about six months trying to get Chloe [Bruce] (Mikyla Dodd) into bed in a burger van! There's a joy in Ricky and Duncan that shouldn't be ignored. They're just trying to get laid – Duncan in particular, by whatever means necessary. Even if that means suggesting that his sexuality isn't what it is. And Ricky has a secret, so we'll meet elements of his family..."

== Storylines ==
Duncan first appears in the village looking for The Dog in the Pond pub. Duncan arrives at the pub and is served by Neville who does not recognise him. Suzanne walks in and recognises him as their fifteen-year-old godson and leaves Neville furious. Duncan moves in with the Ashworths and meets Anita Roy (Saira Choudhry) and flirts with her, but she rejects his advances. Ricky is later annoyed when Duncan joins him on his paper-round. However, they become friends.

Duncan asks Michaela McQueen (Hollie-Jay Bowes) for a massage at Evissa, but she realises he wants more than an average massage. Jacqui McQueen (Claire Cooper) is sickened by his suggestion and waxes his chest painfully for revenge. Duncan is sick over Theresa McQueen (Jorgie Porter) at the students Christmas party after drinking too much. To cheer Ricky up, Duncan persuades him to have a bogus raffle to help pay for their entry fee for a party. Duncan dresses up as Father Christmas and the tickets for the raffle sell fast making them a lot of money. Later, the scam is revealed by their teacher Des Townsend (Kris Deedigan) and Myra McQueen (Nicole Barber-Lane) demands the Harrods hamper they promised. Duncan decides to make his own Christmas goodwill and steals presents from under the McQueens' and Ashworths' tree. Ricky finds the presents and stolen gifts from the Secret Santa in the shack and they open them together. Duncan is infatuated with Theresa after landing in the village, and tries everything he can but nothing he can do can impress her. He gets Darren's advice and dresses like a pimp, and while this somehow works, as well as pretending to be gay, Theresa is not interested. Duncan wins a competition where he gets to have the 16th birthday party of his dreams paid for by a reality TV company. He invites Theresa, who is invited and excited as the prospect of being filmed. While Theresa is impressed, Duncan's hopes are shattered when rap artist Chipmunk performs, and Theresa only has eyes for him. Neville finds the presents and sends Duncan home early to his parents. Duncan steals Suzanne's underwear, but he is caught and lies to her saying he might be gay.

Duncan notices Ricky's strange behaviour and follows him to his house. Duncan hides as Ricky goes in. He tries to look inside and hears raised voices and sees a man lying on the floor. Duncan shouts and Ricky lets him in where he accuses Ricky of being a drug dealer. Ricky snaps and tells Duncan the man is his father Martin (Grant Masters). Duncan is pushed out the door by Ricky after Martin tells him to get rid of him. Ricky later finds Duncan and explains that his father has multiple sclerosis and if he tells anyone he will be put into care. Duncan quizzes Ricky on the condition and he is horrified to learn that nobody is helping Ricky. Duncan gives Ricky a pair of trainers and promises him that he will stand by him and not reveal his secret, and a delighted Ricky thanks him.

Duncan gets a call from a television producer about his sixteenth birthday party being featured on a reality television show. Duncan asks Ricky to help him, but he goes home to look after Martin. Duncan asks Theresa to help him so she agrees and Steve (Anthony Crank) the producer tells them that their double act will be great for television. Duncan is excited as his birthday is filmed for the show and rapper Chipmunk is revealed as his special guest. Duncan is annoyed when Ricky tells him that Theresa is only using him to get on TV, and he realises that his party is boring without his best friend.

Neville and Suzanne decide to leave the village with Duncan and go to Spain. The family leave the village for Spain, but Rhys decides to stay. Duncan returns from Spain and he moves in with Darren Osborne (Ashley Taylor Dawson) along with Rhys. Duncan speaks to his parents and they tell him he has to come home. Duncan begs Rhys to let him stay with him and he agrees. Jack Osborne (Jimmy McKenna) tells Darren and Duncan to move in with the family. Duncan is delighted and accepts.

Duncan announces to Darren in October 2010 that he is getting driving lessons so he can drive and finally get a girl. When Darren quizzed his age, Duncan announced that he was actually 17 – he just lied to the reality show earlier that year so he could have the "Sweet 16th" birthday party. Duncan reveals to Darren in December 2010 that his parents tried to kill him one Christmas, which is the reason why he does not want to join them this year. He also stated that they have been in a number of game and reality TV shows. He is then delighted to hear from Rhys that he is going to join Suzanne, Neville and Josh in Spain for Christmas and that he did not need to worry about the cost of the flight tickets as Neville has already paid for them.

On Christmas Eve along with Jack, Duncan discovers India Longford's (Beth Kingston) body in a nearby woods whilst taking their dog for a walk.

Duncan's sister Ruby (Anna Shaffer) arrives in the village to get away from their reality TV obsessed parents. Duncan joins a boy band, Guy Candy, with:Ricky, Bart McQueen (Jonny Clarke), Seth Costello (Miles Higson) and Taylor Sharpe (Shaun Blackstock) who is later replaced with Gaz Bennett (Joel Goonan). The band is managed by Lee Hunter (Alex Carter) and struggles to achieve success.

Duncan and Ricky spend five days at fat camp. Duncan was hesitant at first but meets a girl, Kelly Saunders (Danielle Malone), who he really likes. They struggle to get together as Duncan cannot understand what a girl like her would see in him but they eventually end up together and lose their virginity to each other. Kelly decides to end their relationship after he shows Ricky a naked picture of her. Realising he needs to grow up, he decides to leave to stay with the Ashworths in Spain.

== Reception ==
Ruth Deller of entertainment website lowculture.co.uk criticised Duncan during her monthly review on the popularity of soap opera characters, where she branded him as useless, "Lots of characters have been (or are about to be) culled from the soap, but sadly, as of yet, Duncan isn't one of them. He and Ricky have been set up to be the new OB and Max, and it really hasn't worked, because OB and Max were actually likeable. Ricky at least has some potentially interesting storylines going for him, but Duncan? He makes Gilly [Roach] and Spencer [Gray] (Darren John Langford) look like characters with a purpose."

In July 2010, Aspen received a nomination in the "Best Newcomer" category at the 2010 Inside Soap Awards for his portrayal of Duncan.
