= Ricky Campbell =

Fictional character from Hollyoaks

- Hollyoaks character
- Portrayed by: Ashley Margolis
- Duration: 2009–2012
- First appearance: 16 June 2009
- Last appearance: 6 August 2012
- Introduced by: Lucy Allan
- Spin-off appearances: Hollyoaks Later (2011)
In-universe information
- Occupation: Student (2009–2012); Florist assistant (2012)
- Father: Martin Campbell

Ricky Campbell is a fictional character from the British Channel 4 soap opera Hollyoaks, played by Ashley Margolis. He made his first on-screen appearance on 16 June 2009. Ricky was created by executive producer Lucy Allan. Margolis took a period of leave in 2010 to complete his real life studies. His main storylines have focused on his friendship with Duncan Button (Dean Aspen) and caring for his father who has multiple sclerosis. Sam Attwater portrayed Ricky's online alter-ego for a few episodes. Ricky was due to be written out of the series in 2011; but Margolis was convinced to stay. However, in 2012 the actor announced his departure once more. He made his final appearance on 6 August 2012.

== Casting ==
In April 2009 a new character called Ricky was announced and fifteen-year-old actor Ashley Margolis would portray him in his first television role. Actor Sam Attwater played a virtual Ricky, whom he was posing as for online dating purposes. In July 2010 Ricky was put on the departed list on the Hollyoaks official website. This led fans to believe Margolis had left and his character written out. The next day the serial confirmed that Margolis had gone on temporary leave for a number of months to complete his GCSE exams and would return to screen in October that year.

In May 2011 it was announced that Margolis had decided to leave the serial after Dean Aspen, who plays on-screen comedy partner Duncan Button, also quit. Discussing his departure, Margolis said: "I'm not sure if I'm crazy or brave but yes, I think it's time for me as an actor to move on. I could very happily stay forever in my comfort zone – Hollyoaks is a great place to work. But with Dean moving on it just feels like the right time." In August 2011 Margolis confirmed he had decided to stay on at Hollyoaks after he had been offered a new storyline. In May 2012, Margolis revealed via his Twitter account that was leaving again, but this time his exit storyline had already been written. He will film his final scenes as Ricky in June 2012.

== Character development ==
E4 publicity describe Ricky as being permanently attached to his skateboard, they also brand him "an abundance of energy". They describe his appearance as typical "boyish good looks" and as having a "cheeky sense of humour".

Ricky's first main storyline was being the sole carer to his father Martin Campbell (Grant Masters), who is suffering from multiple sclerosis. Margolis said he was grateful for the storyline and revealed he put extensive research into the storyline. Speaking of the storyline during an interview with the Press Association, Margolis stated: "I was so grateful I was given the opportunity to do it. Having done research on it, about what young carers have to go through every day, [you realise] it's a hard life. It's brilliant what they do and hopefully this storyline will get people to realise, 'That's what I'm going through'." Margolis also revealed he found it hard to lift Masters in scenes he was caring for him adding that it tired him out and sympathised with those who go through it in real life. It was later revealed that charity Multiple Sclerosis Society of Great Britain had been helping with the storyline, they released a statement reading: "The MS Society understands this is likely to be a dramatic portrayal of MS and its symptoms. While we have advised script writers on how best to progress the storyline the ultimate character interpretation is in the hands of the soaps' producers."

== Storylines ==
=== Backstory ===
Ricky, an only child, was born to Martin, who later develops multiple sclerosis. He had to become the full-time carer of his father after his grandmother could no longer help out, often finding it hard to adapt his social life whilst trying to cope with the daily household jobs.

=== 2009–12 ===
He first arrived to meet Anita for a date, however because she was using Theresa McQueen's (Jorgie Porter) picture, he appeared looking for a blonde girl. He is 14 although was using a picture of someone else and claimed to be 20. He arrived with flowers for Anita but seen Theresa, who he thought was Anita, kissing Newt (Nico Mirallegro). He confronted Theresa, who assumed he was crazy as she had never seen him before. Meanwhile, a stood up Anita with Lauren passed Ricky outside Il Gnosh, they glanced at each other for a second but neither of them knew that the other was in fact the person they were meeting for the date. He recorded Theresa and Newt acting more than friends on his phone and showed it to Anita. She went to kiss him until Ash kicked Ricky out.

He appeared a few weeks later when Anita and her friends went camping in a nearby field. However things did not turn out like Ricky had expected as Anita discovered his camper bag was full of condoms. Despite this, he apologised for his behaviour. During his paper round at Drive 'n' Buy, Gilly Roach (Anthony Quinlan) and Rhys Ashworth (Andrew Moss) found marijuana in Ricky's bag. They confronted him, with Anita. Anita was shocked and when he was asked to pick between his job and not getting to keep the marijuana or keeping the marijuana and losing his job, Ricky ran out with the bag. Anita followed him refusing to believe he would take drugs. Ricky continued seeing Anita, and in September 2009, went to a cottage with Anita, Newt and Lauren Valentine (Dominique Jackson), although their break was ruined when Gaz Bennett (Joel Goonan) arrived and started causing trouble. Gaz punched Ricky after he tried to stand up for Anita, and tried to convince the others to run away. Gaz was hit over the head by one of the gang, eventually revealed to be Anita, although Lauren believed the culprit was Ricky. Ricky continued to support Anita as she went through difficulties with her family after discovering she was adopted, and also stood by her despite knowing what she did to Gaz.

Ricky struck a friendship with Duncan, who pressured him into having sex with Anita. Ricky, however, decided to wait, and was jealous when Anita decided that she wanted to lose her virginity to Dave Colburn (Elliot James Langridge). Ricky began disappearing for long periods of time and it turned out Ricky was caring for his father Martin Campbell (Grant Masters) who is suffering with multiple sclerosis and that Ricky often had to get cannabis for Martin to relieve his pain.

On different occasions Martin tells Ricky to go out and enjoy himself, often injuring himself whilst Ricky is not present and calling him to come back home for help. This begins to affect Ricky's school work. Whilst Ricky is offered support, Kris Fisher (Gerard McCarthy) accidentally assaults him. Ricky tells Martin he does not want to go to hospital in case his arm is broken meaning he can no longer look after him. Soon though, after going to Ricky's home, Kris finds out about Martin's MS, and when Martin suddenly takes ill, Kris has to phone a hospital, where Ricky is terrified of being find out, however eventually he gets to take his father home. Things took a sinister tone though when Ricky told Kris that if he were to tell social services about his father's problems and condition, he would tell the school about what happened to his arm, Kris reluctantly agreed to keep the secret. Kris began to help Ricky and Martin and would often stay the night and help with the daily routine. When Kris rang the paramedics, Ricky was angry and worried that he would be put into care however the Ashworths agreed to let him stay and Ricky realised Martin was in the best place whilst in hospital. Ricky was last seen living with the Ashworths however he did not appear when they left.

Ricky is later seen again in December, when he becomes part of Lee Hunter's Boy Band Guy Candy, also becomes friends with Duncan's sister Ruby Button (Anna Shaffer) when she arrives in January. Ricky left Hollyoaks in August 2012 on results day after messing up his exams.

== Reception ==
When Ricky dumped Ruby via text message a Sunday Mail critic said that it was "not a smart move on his part" because he risked the wrath of three best friends.
