= Hollyoaks Later series 3 =

Hollyoaks Later
- Series 3
- Hollyoaks Later series 3 opening title
- No. of episodes: 5

Release
- Original network: E4
- Original release: 25 October – 29 October 2010

Series chronology
- ← Previous; Series 2 Next → Series 4

The third series of Hollyoaks Later is a British television series and late night spin-off of Channel 4 soap opera Hollyoaks. The series ran on E4 and began on 25 October 2010.

== Development ==
Following the success of the first two series, Hollyoaks producer Paul Marquess announced in April 2010 that the late-night show would return for a third series in October 2010, after being commissioned by Channel 4. Speaking about the series, Marquess said: "This commission is a huge vote of confidence in Hollyoaks from Channel 4. Seamlessly integrated with the 6.30pm shows, Hollyoaks Later 2010 will be the most exciting series so far. Prepare to be blown away."

Roberto Troni, the commissioning editor for Channel 4, also commented on the announcement, saying: "Hollyoaks is a hit with E4 audiences. We always look for opportunities to extend the brand and give fans something extra. The Hollyoaks Later spin-off provides a unique opportunity to experiment in a late-night slot while staying true to the series. The late-night storylines will be a cocktail of fun, glamour, and grown-up drama."

Cage fighter Michael Bisping, who was cast as "sinister" gangster Nathan, told Sky Sports that viewers should expect "powerful" scenes from his guest appearance in the series. He said: "Some people will laugh at it, but the storyline is fantastic and I'm proud to be a part of it. I can't say too much about the plot, but it comes on our screens on October 25. I play a bit of a bad guy in it and get involved in a spot of kidnapping and whatnot. It's pretty powerful stuff in places and I'm sure people will get a kick out of it. I really enjoyed doing it and I'm pleased I took the opportunity when it came my way. I seemed to have a natural flair for acting and it's something I enjoy. There are a couple of other projects in the pipeline now and I'm interested in doing more."

In October 2010, Channel 4 decided to axe the Hollyoaks 'First Look' episodes, which broadcast the next day's episode on E4 straight after the Channel 4 show ended, for one week during the broadcast of Hollyoaks Later. This was in order to make sure the series was not spoiled, as it would connect with the main Hollyoaks show.

Rachel Shenton, who portrays Mitzeee commented on the series, saying: "It felt a lot different [to Hollyoaks] because we were on location so it felt like we were doing a completely different show for a lot of it. You could push the boundaries a little bit more and we touched on subjects that Hollyoaks couldn't cover properly. We had a great time, it was really good."

The official trailer of the series was released and broadcast in mid October 2010, two weeks before the series started.

== Plot ==
The series follows four stories. Riley and Seth Costello are invited to a party at a footballer's house and the McAllisters plot their revenge. Jason Costello is confronted by Fern and admits his gender dysphoria, only to have Fern threaten to tell his family and Bart McQueen. Mercedes Fisher, upset over Malachy Fisher and Lynsey Nolan's relationship, lies that she has been infected with HIV by Malachy. Mitzeee teaches Nancy Hayton and a heavily pregnant Theresa McQueen how to become a WAG.

== Cast ==
The cast were confirmed in April 2010, with several of the Hollyoaks series regulars returning. Actress Hollie-Jay Bowes, who portrays Michaela McQueen, was originally signed to appear in the series. However, Bowes was later axed from Hollyoaks and the character was replaced.

Character	Actor
Mitzeee	Rachel Shenton
Carl Costello	Paul Opacic
Jasmine Costello	Victoria Atkin
Riley Costello	Rob Norbury
Seth Costello	Miles Higson
Mercedes Fisher	Jennifer Metcalfe
Malachy Fisher	Glen Wallace
Nancy Hayton	Jessica Fox
Bart McQueen	Jonny Clarke
Theresa McQueen	Jorgie Porter
Elliot Bevan	Garnon Davies
Cheryl Brady	Bronagh Waugh
Jamil Fadel	Sikander Malik
Lynsey Nolan	Karen Hassan
Anita Roy	Saira Choudhry
Carmel Valentine	Gemma Merna
Logan Fairhurst	Thomas Sean Hughes
Liam McAllister	Chris Overton
Nathan McAllister	Michael Bisping
Fern	Amy Gavin
Chanterelle	Leanne Urey
Mark	Daniel Gallagher
Sami	Candy McCulloch
Terry Vincent	Ian Munzberger
Dean	Sol Heras

== Ratings ==
Episode #	Airdate	E4		E4+1	
Episode #	Airdate	Viewers^{a}	Share %	Viewers^{a}	Share %
1	25 October 2010	447	1.8	N/A	N/A
2	26 October 2010	438	1.8	N/A	N/A
3	27 October 2010	309	1.2	N/A	N/A
4	28 October 2010	553	N/A	125	N/A
5	29 October 2010	368	1.6	173	0.9

^{a}Viewers in thousands.
All viewer figures are from BARB.
