= Frankie Osborne =

Fictional character from Hollyoaks

- Hollyoaks character
- Portrayed by: Helen Pearson
- Duration: 2002–2017
- First appearance: 20 August 2002
- Last appearance: 27 November 2017
- Introduced by: Jo Hallows
- Spin-off appearances: Hollyoaks: In Too Deep (2004)
In-universe information
- Other names: Frankie Dean
- Occupation: Pub landlady Cher impersonator
- Family: Dean/Osborne
- Sisters: Linda Wallace
- Husband: Johnno Dean (until 2004); Jack Osborne (2005–2017)
- Sons: Brian Bloom; Jake Dean; Craig Dean
- Daughters: Debbie Dean; Steph Cunningham
- Stepsons: Darren Osborne
- Stepdaughters: Ruth Osborne; Bethany Cunningham
- Grandsons: JJ Osborne (step); Oscar Osborne (step); Charlie Dean (step; adoptive)
- Granddaughters: Esther Bloom; Frankie Osborne (step); Morgan Osborne (step)
- Aunts: Irene Wallace

Francine "Frankie" Osborne (also Dean) is a fictional character from the British Channel 4 soap opera Hollyoaks, played by Helen Pearson, making her first on-screen appearance on 20 August 2002. Frankie was once the longest-serving female character in the show. On 9 October 2017, Pearson announced that she would depart the show, and Frankie was killed off on 1 November 2017, after suffering a stroke, making her the second member of the Dean family to be killed off after her daughter Steph Cunningham (portrayed by Carley Stenson) in 2010. She made her final appearance on 27 November 2017, as a ghost to Jack Osborne (portrayed by Jimmy McKenna).

== Storylines ==
In the show, Frankie arrives alongside her family, Johnno, Jake, Debbie, and Craig in August 2002 when they joined Steph, who arrived two years earlier in March 2000. When Johnno is made redundant, the family begins struggling financially and Frankie and Johnno's marriage begins to fall apart. Johnno turns to alcohol but manages to stop and he and Frankie reconcile.

Their marriage soon begins to decline, and Johnno confesses to Frankie that he has been having an affair with 19-year-old Michelle. Frankie is prepared to forgive Johnno until she discovers that Michelle is pregnant with Johnno's baby. She files for divorce and Jake, Debbie and Craig disown him, although Steph decides to keep in contact with him. When Johnno comes back to Hollyoaks, he and Frankie are finally divorced, but Frankie forgives Johnno for his infidelity and the two remain friends. Right after her divorce, she marries Jack Osborne, who had been a widower for five years after the death of his wife, Jill Osborne. All of their family attends the wedding, except stepdaughter Ruth, who couldn't attend.

In 2006, Frankie falls pregnant. She is happy about the news although the rest of her family is not. Frankie, however, suffers from a miscarriage early on in her pregnancy. She finds this difficult to accept and it takes her some time to move on. The Dog on the Pond, the pub they owned, is destroyed in an explosion. Jack and Frankie are out for a meal when the pub explodes and Frankie and Jack nearly lose Darren, Steph, Craig, and Jake, as they are trapped inside the pub when it explodes and catches fire. While they use the insurance money to rebuild the pub, they stay at a grimy bed and breakfast where the owner constantly treats them poorly. They are kicked out and briefly live with the McQueen family, until finally Frankie has had enough and forces Jack to use the insurance money he has been pocketing to pay for a nice hotel until they can go back to their apartment.

Frankie is concerned with making sure Becca's newborn son stays with them while Becca is in prison. Becca eventually agrees, and when Becca is killed in a prison fight Charlie comes to live with Jake full-time. Frankie and Jack go on holiday, and when they return they learn that Frankie's daughter Debbie has been in a car crash. Frankie leaves to look after her. Jake confesses his love for Nancy, disgusting Frankie. Nancy can't believe that she would put her prejudice before her son. Frankie returns in 2007. John Paul McQueen refers to her as a homophobe after she tells him he has failed at turning her son Craig gay, as she is unaware that John Paul and Craig are secretly sleeping together). When she discovers the truth about Craig's sexuality, she refuses to believe he is gay. When Craig comes out to his family Frankie is disappointed, which hurts Craig. Frankie reluctantly accepts her son's relationship with John Paul. The day after Craig leaves for Dublin, she is seen drinking a glass of gin and reading his acceptance letter, smiling.

To get over the loss of Craig, Frankie decides to take in a foster child. Their first attempt, a little girl named Daisy, ends quickly due to Darren's hostility towards her. They then take in a moody 15-year-old emo boy named Newt. He is taken back into care after being accused of taking Frankie's jewelry. It is discovered that Darren was actually taking the jewelry when Carmel is buying Christmas presents for her family and buys Frankie's ring from a pawn shop. Frankie borrows the video from the pawn shop, which shows Darren selling the jewelry. Whilst Frankie and Jack argue with Darren about it, Warren and Louise walk into the pub. Warren reveals that Darren had bet with him and lost his fifty percent of The Dog In The Pond to Warren. This leads Jack to suffer a heart attack.

On 22 January 2008, Frankie is told that Charlie has an acute form of leukemia. Nancy and Jake plead with doctors to run tests to see if either of them are eligible to donate their bone marrow to Charlie. Later on, doctors confirm that Jake cannot donate bone marrow as he is not Charlie's biological father, confirming that Justin Burton (who had an affair with Becca) is Charlie's dad. Jake later confesses that when he took the DNA test last year, he threw away the results without opening them. Frankie is hurt by this since he could've confided in her. When Nancy tries to find Justin, Jake protests and tells her that Justin isn't going to go anywhere near Charlie. Frankie slaps Jake to calm him and tells Nancy to find Justin. The situation causes Frankie and Nancy to become closer to friends.

Frankie is concerned when Jack borrows £100,000 in cash from a loan shark to buy back Warren's share of the Dog. When Carl and Anthony, criminal friends of Warren's, raid the pub to demand the cash at gunpoint, Frankie stands up to them in defense of Jack and Newt, and the three escape from the incident unscathed after Warren and Mike Barnes come to the rescue.

Frankie is protective of Jake after his split from Nancy, not knowing that Jake had tried to rape Nancy on their wedding night. When Nancy files for custody of Charlie, Frankie is furious, claiming that they are Charlie's real family. While Jack and Steph begin to notice Jake's increasingly erratic behavior, Frankie still stands by his side. She vents her anger at Nancy and Justin, whom she blames for trying to ruin Jake's life, especially after Nancy accuses Jake of rape. When Steph comes forward and reveals that she had walked in on Jake attempting to rape Nancy, Frankie begins to blame her, telling her she is turning her back on her family, despite Jack, Steph, and Newt trying to make her see reason.

At the hospital, Jake reveals that he did try to rape Nancy. Frankie leaves him alone to say goodbye to Charlie before taking him to the police. Jake later abducts Charlie and attempts to kill himself and Charlie by gassing them in a car in the woods. Frankie frantically searches for her son. She finds Nancy with Charlie and demands to know where Jake is. Nancy had left Jake in the car to die, but Frankie discovers Jake is gone when she goes to search the car. She later admits she was scared for him, knowing that he will try to kill himself again. Jake tries to blame his descent into madness on his father walking out on the family three years earlier; however, Frankie tells him, "Your father may have been a naive and reckless man, but for all his faults, Johnno would never have done anything as bad as what you have done."

Warren offers Darren £100,000 to help with money problems if he framed Jake by putting Sean's wallet in Jake's room. Jake was convicted of killing Sean, and Louise was released. Frankie didn't believe Jake had killed Sean and accused Louise of framing Jake. Shortly after Eli used Frankie's salon keys to get into the trash place before writing on the walls DIE and RIP in red paint. The next day a thug entered with an iron bar before smashing all of the glasses and stealing money from the till. Frankie immediately assumed Louise had been behind it. On 27 May 2009, Frankie and Jack found out that Darren had taken a £100,000 bribe from Warren Fox to get Jake to confess to Sean Kennedy's murder before gambling away the money, despite the family being in debt. Frankie and Jack disowned him for lying and gambling away the money before telling him he had been given enough chances. After this, an ashamed Darren stayed in his flat and rarely left, knowing everyone knew about the gambling, however, Cindy Cunningham managed to get him a job at a charity event in Il Ghosh.

In October 2009 Jake is released from the mental institute he had been in and had all charges against him dropped due to his mental state, Frankie struggles through and copes with Jake's return. However, Jake's return brings back the feud between Frankie and Nancy, leading to Frankie handing over Charlie to Nancy as Jake is not allowed near him.

Frankie figures out that Gilly Roach is in love with Steph. However, Gilly denies it and says that he loves Cheryl Brady (Bronagh Waugh), his girlfriend. With encouragement from Frankie, Steph tells Gilly she loves him, and they get together, but the happiness is short-lived when Steph finds she has cervical cancer. Frankie finds out from Steph's brother-in-law Tom Cunningham.

Frankie discovers that Newt's birth mother, Shelley Newton, has returned for a job interview, along with her baby son Jensen Newton. Shelley returns from the interview and announces she's got a job in Scotland. She asks Newt to come with her and Jensen; he accepts, and the reunited family relocate.

Steph has a hysterectomy and struggles with the fact she will never have children of her own despite raising Tom. Steph and Gilly marry when Steph finds out her cancer is terminal. Frankie struggles to accept the fact her daughter will die before her. Steph saves Amy Barnes and her children during a fire and then decides she'd rather die of the fire than cancer. Frankie breaks down in Darren's arms when finding out the news, and contacts her ex-husband Johnno and children Jake, Debbie, and Craig of Steph's death. Frankie begins to blame Gilly for Steph's death and argues with him over the funeral plans, telling him that Steph was still in love with Max and that he would have saved her from the fire. After having Steph cremated they sit to watch Steph's goodbye messages; however, she had died before getting the chance to film one for Frankie. She is deeply upset about the fact that Steph is dead but still sets a place at the table for her at Christmas. This leaves Jack very concerned for her well-being.

In 2011, Doug Carter attempts to commit suicide by jumping off of a bridge but eventually decides he would be better off alive after conversing with the ghost of Steph. Doug organizes a Christmas party and invites many of his friends, including Frankie, and, after being told by Steph's ghost he tells Frankie to look in the CD filled with Steph's messages for her family. She is overjoyed and shocked to find that there is an extra recording entitled "Mum" and Frankie listens to the goodbye message from her daughter.

In January, the Osbornes have an intruder whom Tom hits over the head. It is later revealed that the intruder is in fact Frankie's granddaughter, Esther. The father was Frankie’s son, born when she was 16. Frankie thought he had died; in reality, her parents put him up for adoption. She allows Esther Bloom to live with her.

In October 2012, Nancy gives birth prematurely after having an emergency cesarean section and Jack and Frankie comfort her. Frankie is angry over Darren blaming Nancy for her problems. They go to the hospital to see Nancy and the baby. When Nancy asks what Darren told her and Jack, Frankie decides not to tell her that they know about her and Darren's argument and Frankie's subsequent argument. At Oscar's christening, Darren apologizes to Frankie, and they make up.

At Tony Hutchinson's wedding to Cindy Longford, which is shared with Ste Hay and Doug Carter, a minibus driven by Maddie Morrison crashes into the venue. Frankie panics when she cannot find Tom; however, Jack tells her he is safe with the other children, who are being looked after by Annalise Appleton. Frankie survives the ordeal without any injuries and helps Ruby cope with the deaths of Maddie and Neil Cooper. The next day, Ruby's fiancé Jono dies in her arms after suffering undetected internal injuries from the crash, and Jack and Frankie comfort her.

Frankie accompanies Ruby and Esther to a memorial held at the college for Maddie, Neil, and Jono. Esther breaks down, insults Maddie, and tells Maddie's mother, Elizabeth, about how Maddie bullied her. Frankie is furious and orders Esther to apologize to Elizabeth, unwilling to listen to Esther's explanation. Ruby tells Frankie that Esther was in love with Maddie, and Frankie believes this to be the reason Esther broke down at the memorial. Frankie does not believe Esther when she tells her that Ruby is lying.

Frankie comforts Darren and Nancy when they find out Oscar is deaf. However, when Nancy angrily snaps at Charlie for trying to "help" Oscar by attempting to give him painkillers, Frankie chooses to comfort Charlie and tells Nancy she was wrong to shout at him. When Charlie subsequently runs away from home, Frankie, along with Jack, Darren, Nancy, Callum Kane, and Seamus Brady, goes out to search for him. Charlie is taken to the hospital and, while having no serious injuries, the doctors decide to keep him for observation. Both Nancy and Frankie volunteer to stay with him. Jack sends them home, where Frankie snaps and begins arguing that Nancy's treatment of Charlie almost caused her only grandchild to die. Esther, standing behind Frankie, runs off hurt. Nancy then states that Esther is Frankie's grandchild, not Charlie, and that Frankie has no right to tell her how to look after her child. Frankie then slaps Nancy.

Frankie and Esther's relationship continues to become distant when Sinead O'Connor (Stephanie Davis) and Ruby bully Esther and turn Frankie against her. Esther eventually attempts suicide and is rushed to the hospital. She is told that she has to have a liver transplant. Frankie is initially furious with Esther for this although she eventually apologizes. When Ruby confesses to bullying Esther, she is kicked out by the Osbornes but is later allowed to move back in when she is forgiven by Esther. After Esther receives a new liver and is released from the hospital, Frankie becomes overprotective of her.

When Sandy Roscoe (Gillian Taylforth) moves to Hollyoaks, Frankie accuses Jack of having an affair with her causing problems in their marriage and Frankie accidentally runs over a pregnant Lindsey Butterfield (Sophie Austin) causing her to have a miscarriage. Frankie becomes stressed and begins a sexual affair with Ruby's boyfriend, Ziggy Roscoe (Fabrizio Santino) however she and Jack eventually sort things out.

In September 2015, Frankie goes to stay with her daughter Debbie and visit her ex-husband Johnno. During this time, Jack sells the pub, and the Osbornes move to a new home. They also adopt Jade Albright, who eventually discovers she has cancer. When she eventually returns, Frankie is stopped by Lindsey Butterfield who, unbeknownst to her, has just been outed as a serial killer. She tells Frankie that there has been an accident and she needs to get to the hospital. Frankie lets her get into the van and the two drive off. It is later revealed as a trap as Lindsey has kidnapped Frankie and has put her in the back of the van. Lindsey then phones Esther, who she later meets outside of the van. Lindsey opens the back doors of the van, revealing Frankie. Lindsey says that if Esther doesn't help her, she will kill Frankie.

In July 2016, after discovering that Esther is planning to marry Kim Butterfield, who she has a strong dislike for, Frankie teams up with Grace Black to try and stop the wedding, sabotaging it by trashing the Osborne house and stealing all of the wedding decorations. However, she ultimately does attend the wedding. She is later left devastated as her foster daughter, Jade Albright's cancer returns, and she supports her, along with the rest of the Osbornes, despite her anger. Jade passes away after contracting an infection as a result of being immune suppressed, devastating Frankie and the rest of the Osborne family.

Frankie confides in Jack and Esther that she is beginning to feel like she doesn't have a purpose anymore and decides to start touring her Cher impersonation act again. To her surprise, Johnno comes to visit and explains that his partner dropped out of a planned Cher and Elvis tour. Frankie is torn between staying with Jack and going with Johnno. She and Jack argue, and he eventually gives her an ultimatum, asking her to meet him at the school where a prize-giving ceremony in memory of Jade was being held if she decides to stay with him. Frankie is close to choosing Johnno but turns him down at the last minute, telling him she is still in love with Jack. Unbeknownst to her, there is an explosion at the school and Jack is left trapped under rubble. Believing that he is dying, Jack leaves Darren a message to take to Frankie. She calls him and leaves a message apologizing for nearly leaving and reaffirming her love for him. As Jack is being put into the ambulance, Diane O'Connor offers to go to the Osborne's to tell Frankie about what has happened. After hanging up the phone, Frankie sees the news on the television and collapses. When Diane gets to the house, she finds Frankie lying on the floor and calls the paramedics. She calls Jack and informs him that Frankie has suffered a stroke and stopped breathing. Frankie is declared dead by the paramedics on 1 November 2017 and her funeral is held on 23 November.

Frankie briefly appears on 27 November as a ghost to Jack. Fighting for his life in the hospital, Jack tells Frankie that he is coming to join her, but she convinces him to carry on living. They say a final goodbye and Jack recovers from his injuries.

== Characterization ==
The Daily Star described Frankie as a "feisty blonde".

== Reception ==
Holy Soap described her most memorable moment as being "Almost losing it after suffering a miscarriage in 2006." Bryan Kirkwood said "I love Jack and Frankie – they're essentially the heart of the show". Daniel Kilkelly from Digital Spy branded Frankie a "feisty barmaid".

Frankie's death garnered strong emotional reactions from fans, with many praising the plot twist.
