= Gaz Bennett =

UK soap opera character, created 2008

- Hollyoaks character
- Portrayed by: Joel Goonan
- Duration: 2008–2011
- First appearance: 25 November 2008
- Last appearance: 11 November 2011
- Introduced by: Bryan Kirkwood
In-universe information
- Occupation: Glass collector (2011); Merchandise seller (2011)

Gaz Bennett is a fictional character from the British Channel 4 soap opera Hollyoaks, played by Joel Goonan. He debuted on-screen during the episode airing on 25 November 2008. Goonan took a break from filming during 2010, and returned on-screen on 19 January 2011. Goonan announced his permanent departure from Hollyoaks in October 2011. He made his final appearance on 11 November 2011.

== Character development ==
Goonan took a short break from filming during 2010, returning to filming in winter. A spokesperson described the scenes stating: "Much to Anita's concern, Gaz will be making a shocking return to the village in the weeks ahead." His return scenes aired in January 2011.

Gaz is introduced as the leader of a racist hoodie gang. Gaz has already shown his hatred of black, Asian and bisexual characters including Ash Roy (Junade Khan), Anita Roy (Saira Choudhry), Ravi Roy (Stephen Uppal), Lauren Valentine (Dominique Jackson) and Calvin Valentine (Ricky Whittle). Despite his "hard" personality, Gaz is seen to be vulnerable when Zak Ramsey (Kent Riley) beats him up while he was on his own. Gaz got his comeuppance in the media dubbed 'Super September', in which Gaz was attacked and left in a coma.

Viewers of Hollyoaks asked Joel Goonan on the official website why he thinks Gaz is bullying Anita. Goonan replied: "I don't actually know! I don't think Gaz has actually got that many friends — he's got people who follow him, but he hasn't got many friends. He's quite disturbed really. I don't think it's necessarily to do with Anita being Asian or anything like that, I think it's just the fact that she's really vulnerable and Gaz knows he can take advantage of her at any time. It's nothing to do with her skin colour, its about Gaz seeing her as a really weak person. He knows he can bully her and she'll be too scared to do anything back to him." Goonan was also asked if he found portraying an "evil" character difficult. Replying to this, he said: "Not really. Well I wasn't like that in school or anything, I've never been a bully. But I've grown up in quite a rough part of Manchester so I've been surrounded by people like that since I've been in school. So it was quite easy to portray that type of character because I've been around those kind of people for years. I've sort of found myself mimicking people I used to know."

In October 2011, Goonan announced that he had finished filming with the serial.

== Storylines ==
Gaz first appears as a student at Hollyoaks High School, and he begins work experience at take-away Relish. His work experience turns out bad as he turns up late, does no work and is racist towards Anita, Lauren, Calvin and Ash, which ends up with him being sacked by Ash. At school, local Police Community Support Officer Carmel McQueen (Gemma Merna) opens a police stall. Gaz and his gang turn up a heater, causing Carmel to sweat and take her jacket off. They then give her a lollipop, which she begins to eat, before taking a picture on a mobile phone of her. This phone is then confiscated by Russ Owen (Stuart Manning). The gang later spray-paint a picture of Carmel on the skate ramps, but are interrupted by Calvin, who Gaz is then racist towards. Gaz and his gang steal Relish's week's takings from Gilly Roach (Anthony Quinlan), also beating him up. Zak attacks Gaz, who is scared without his gang. Gilly refuses to acknowledge that it was Gaz who stole the takings. Feeling embarrassed, Gilly tells Ash and Calvin that the man who mugged him was 'huge'. Zak confronts Gaz, but loses his temper and punches him. Zak is cautioned by the police. Gaz and his gang then beat up Gilly, who does not file a complaint. Gaz starts harassing Theresa McQueen (Jorgie Porter), and is warned off by Russ, Jacqui McQueen (Claire Cooper) and Tony Hutchinson (Nick Pickard).

Gaz tempts former drug-addict Sasha Valentine (Nathalie Emmanuel) into smoking cannabis. However, she refuses. Gaz yet again harasses Zak and Ash, after Zak throws his football away. His football apparently bursts, caused by Zak, Gaz asks for food from Relish as compensation. Zak puts laxatives in curry sauce and gives it to him, before watching as Gaz has an accident. It is later discovered by Ash and Zak that Gaz used his faeces to paint "Paki Lover" on the front of Relish. The following day, after being threatened by Ash, Gaz decides to make peace. Zak tells him to leave, not accepting his apology. Gaz then begins beating himself up, making it look like it is Zak and Ash. The pair are then arrested for assault. As revenge on Ash, Gaz sets fire to Relish. He is then expelled from school after his racist bullying of Anita. Gaz is not seen again until April, when he apologises to Anita, telling her he has changed. He then helps Anita after she is threatened by her enemy, Lauren. After convincing her to meet him, Gaz's gang appear and hold Anita down as Gaz pours white paint over her, recording it on a mobile phone in the process. The next day, Anita tells her older brothers Ash and Ravi, they trick Gaz before beating him up. Gaz returns to school drunk to see Anita. He locks his former teacher Nancy Hayton (Jessica Fox) in a classroom and tries to assault her. However, Russ saves her.

Gaz mugs Mercedes McQueen (Jennifer Metcalfe) after being kicked out of his home. When Ste Hay (Kieron Richardson) finds this out, he threatens him because Mercedes was looking after his son Lucas Hay, who could have been injured. He then begins sleeping in the school, where Barry Newton (Nico Mirallegro), Anita and Lauren find him. After filming Newt and Anita kissing, Gaz follows them to a secluded cottage, where he pressures Anita into sex. Anita spikes his drink with peanuts, due to his allergy. Newt attacks him as Anita escapes. Gaz follows, chasing Anita. Gaz decides to rape Anita whilst filming it on his mobile. Anita grabs a rock and hits Gaz over the head. Gaz then falls into a coma and later pretends to suffer from amnesia as to what had happened. After being released from hospital, Gaz asks Anita and Ricky Campbell (Ashley Margolis) if they know who attacked him. Anita tells him she would not help him and that she does not know who it was. The group consisting of Anita, Newt, Ricky, Lauren and Theresa stop being friends after the attack. Lauren pretends to befriend Gaz and pours tomato soup over him, as revenge for his racist attack on Anita. In the following weeks Gaz and Lauren become closer and begin a relationship however Gaz uses her to humiliate Anita. Gaz's relationship develops even further and they both plan to steal Spencer Gray's (Darren John Langford) inheritance. However, their plan starts to scupper when as Gaz watches Lauren lie to Spencer that she is pregnant with his child, Spencer panics and starts telling Sasha about the situation. Everyone is starting to believe that Gaz is the father, unaware that Lauren had made the whole thing up.

Gaz and Lauren intended to secretly leave Hollyoaks on Calvin and Carmel's wedding day, however this was halted when Calvin is shot dead by Theresa, who is pregnant with Calvin's child. However, Lauren changes her mind after she lied to Sasha and Leo Valentine (Brian Bovell) that she had a miscarriage and runs away with Gaz; however, when they realise that they cannot cope without any money, they return to the village to hatch another plan, that Gaz should leave on his own and return to Lauren with some money. However, when they are in an alleyway near The Loft, they are ambushed by the police, who believed that Gaz is Calvin's murderer. Lauren and Gaz later break up when she reconciles with Anita. Anita then accuses him of spraying racist graffiti at Relish. As revenge he was intentionally wrongly advised by teacher Des Townsend (Kris Deedigan) to confront Anita. Gaz follows Des' advice and takes Theresa's mobile phone and texts Anita to meet in the woods. She agrees to meet but he holds her hostage. However, when Gaz looks into his bag, he finds a gun that Anita had found earlier, planted by Jacqui. As he stood in shock, holding the gun; the police arrive and they arrest him. He is then subsequently charged with the murder of Calvin as the gun he was holding was actually used to shoot Calvin. He is also charged with holding the gun to harm Anita. He was transferred to prison. Michaela McQueen (Hollie-Jay Bowes) then interviewed him for an article about Des being a racist. During this scene, Michaela told Gaz about Lauren falling down the stairs at The Loft and having a blood clot. He got angry and thought she was making it up. His final scene was when Lauren visited him in prison. He assumed that she supported him and that she still loved him, but when Lauren gets strangely quiet he soon realised that she doesn't. He got angry and frustrated and she seemed careless. She walked away and leaves him, leading prison guards to restrain him when he was about to get out of control. This made him shout across the room to Lauren saying that he doesn't need her help and support anyway, leaving him slightly heartbroken.

Gaz returns in 2011 and threatens Anita before she leaves Hollyoaks. He later gets a job in The Dog in the Pond pub by owner Heidi Costello and later finds her upset where they end up kissing. Later that month, while helping Rae take her belongings in to the flat he finds a drug stash which is Doug Carter's and later becomes involved with drug dealing by working for Brendan Brady. In October 2011, he began a relationship with Sinead O'Connor (Stephanie Davis), he later attempts to kiss Maddie Morrison (Scarlett Bowman), so she warns Sinead about Gaz but Sinead doesn't believe her and they both leave after getting a job offer. Sinead's ex-boyfriend Bart McQueen (Jonny Clarke) tracks them both down and declares his love for Sinead at a gig. Bart and Sinead later kiss and Gaz looks on. This is Gaz's last appearance as he goes travelling with the band alone.

== Reception ==
Grace Dent of The Guardian joked about one of Gaz's light hearted storylines which featured after tragic storylines stating: "cruel, skint January has been brightened with a lawnmower race featuring Gaz and Lauren astride killer-bladed mowers, larking about like people who'd clearly forgotten they were stalked habitually by bad luck and tragedy."
