= Anna Shaffer =

British actress (b. 1992)

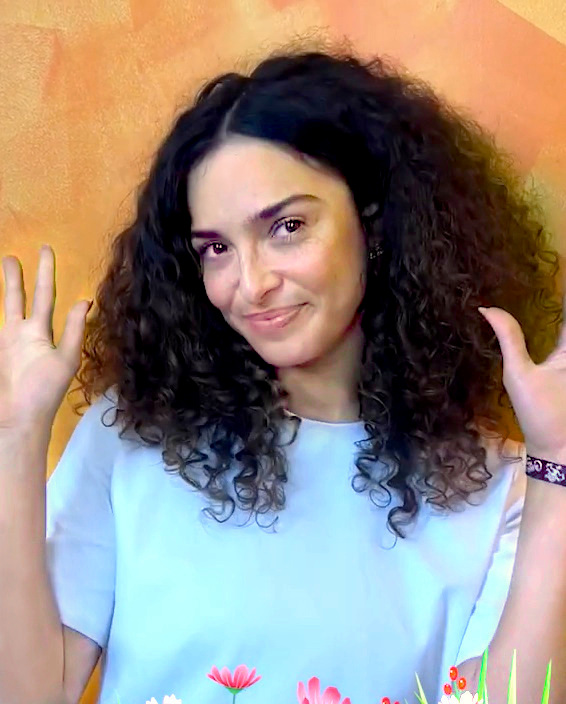
- Shaffer at the German Comic Con 2022
- Born: Anna Maureen Barth Shaffer; 15 March 1992 (age 34); London, England
- Occupation: Actress
- Years active: 2009–present
- Spouse: Jimmy Stephenson (m. 2021)

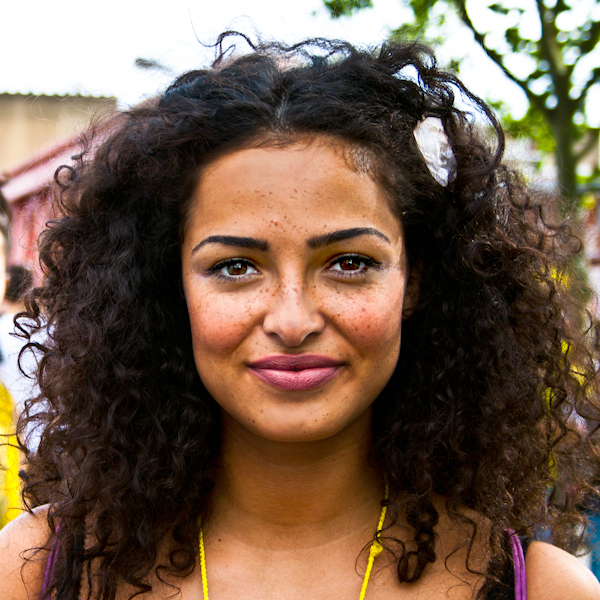
Anna Shaffer at the Notting Hill Carnival 2011

Anna Maureen Barth Shaffer (born 15 March 1992) is an English actress. She gained prominence through her roles as Romilda Vane in the Harry Potter films (2009–2011) and Ruby Button in the E4 soap opera Hollyoaks (2011–2018). As of 2019, she plays Triss Merigold in the Netflix adaptation of The Witcher.

== Early life ==
Shaffer was born in North London to South African parents; her mother is of Zulu heritage and spent her childhood growing up on a Black Zulu farmland in South Africa, and her father is a Jewish South African of Sephardic and African descent whose father moved them to Israel for a year when he was a baby and was forced back to South Africa by his wife, Anna’s grandmother. She has a brother. She attended Highgate Wood School and completed her A Levels at the Camden School for Girls.

== Career ==
On 19 December 2007, Shaffer was cast in the film Harry Potter and the Half-Blood Prince as Romilda Vane, the fourth year student who tried to use a love potion on Harry. She reprised this role in Harry Potter and the Deathly Hallows – Part 1 and Harry Potter and the Deathly Hallows – Part 2 in 2010 and 2011.

In December 2010, the Liverpool Echo reported that eighteen-year-old Shaffer would be joining the cast of Hollyoaks as Ruby, the sister of Duncan Button (Dean Aspen). Shaffer originally auditioned for the role of Leanne Holiday, but she was later cast as Ruby. Shaffer relocated to Liverpool, where Hollyoaks is filmed, for the role. She began filming her scenes in late 2010. Shaffer made her first on-screen appearance as Ruby in the episode broadcast on 3 January 2011. In May 2011, it was speculated that Shaffer would be leaving Hollyoaks. However, this was denied and a show spokesperson told Digital Spy "We don't want to spoil the storylines for the viewers, however we can confirm that Anna Shaffer is with Hollyoaks for the foreseeable future.". Shaffer left Hollyoaks in 2014 but returned briefly in November 2017 and April 2018.

During 2012, she appeared in the music video for YDEK by Warehouse Republic, then in October 2013, Shaffer said she would be leaving Hollyoaks in the new year in an interview with Digital Spy on 23 November, saying "I've loved my time at Hollyoaks and playing Ruby, but I've just got itchy feet and I want a new, fresh beginning. Obviously we film up in Liverpool and I miss London, my parents, my brother, so I'm ready for a change but I'll be really sad to leave". Shaffer made her on screen exit from Hollyoaks as Ruby on 13 February 2014. In 2014 she appeared in one episode of Glue as "Heather", and, in 2016, played Rachel in two episodes of Class.

Shaffer plays the role of Triss Merigold in the Netflix series The Witcher.

== Filmography ==
=== Film ===
Year	Title	Role
2009	Harry Potter and the Half-Blood Prince	Romilda Vane
2010	Harry Potter and the Deathly Hallows – Part 1	Romilda Vane
2011	Harry Potter and the Deathly Hallows – Part 2	Romilda Vane
2018	I Am Vengeance	Sandra

=== Television ===
Year	Title	Role	Notes
2011–2014, 2017–2018	Hollyoaks	Ruby Button	Regular role
2014	Glue	Heather	1 episode
2016	Class	Rachel Chapman	2 episodes
2017	Fearless	Leila	4 episodes
2019–present	The Witcher	Triss Merigold	19 episodes

=== Music videos ===
Year	Title	Notes
2012	YDEK by Warehouse Republic	Girl

== Awards and nominations ==
Year	Award	Category	Result	Ref.
2013	British Soap Awards	Sexiest Female	Longlisted	
