= Helen Pearson =

British actress (b. 1959)

- Born: 16 November 1959 (age 65); Leicester, Leicestershire, England
- Years active: 1986–present
- Television: EastEnders (1990); Emmerdale (2000–2001); Hollyoaks (2002–2017)
- Spouse: Paul Faulkner (m. 2013)
- Relatives: Richard Cadell (brother)

Helen Pearson (born 16 November 1959) is a British actress who has been in three major soap operas, EastEnders (during 1990, as April McIntosh), Emmerdale (from 2000 to 2001, as Carol Wareing), and Hollyoaks (from 2002 until 2017, as Frankie Osborne).

== Career ==
Her first acting role was in 1987, playing a Nurse in The Growing Pains of Adrian Mole. She also played April in EastEnders in the early 1990s.

She has also appeared in the television dramas The Darling Buds of May and Murder in Mind.

Before making her Hollyoaks debut, she also played the character Mrs. Atkins in Attachments.

On Halloween 2017, after having been the longest-serving female on Hollyoaks as Frankie Osborne for 15 years, the character was killed off and Pearson left the show.

== Personal life ==
Pearson married Paul Faulkner in 2013. In 2015, she was convicted of driving under the influence. She is the older sister of Richard Cadell, the incumbent puppeteer for Sooty, and appeared with her brother in the 2013 episode "The Dance Competition".

== Filmography ==
| Year | Title | Role | Notes |
|---|---|---|---|
| 1987 | The Growing Pains of Adrian Mole | Nurse | 5 episodes |
| 1988 | Consuming Passions | Supermarket Assistant | Film |
| 1989 | Close to Home | Winnie | Episode: "Helen's Parents" |
| 1990 | EastEnders | April McIntosh | Recurring role, 14 episodes |
| 1991, 1993, 1994, 1996 | The Bill | Mrs. Styles / Sonia Philips / Jenny Clifford / Mrs. Beaty | 4 episodes |
| 1992 | The Darling Buds of May | Polly | Episode: "Le Grand Weekend" |
| 1996 | A Touch of Frost | Addie Parsons | Episode: "Fun Times for Swingers" |
| 1997 | Holding On | Paula | Episode #1.1 |
| 2000 | Inspector Morse | Debbie Rep | Episode: "The Remorseful Day" |
| 2000–2001 | Emmerdale | Carol Wareing | Series regular, 79 episodes |
| 2000, 2002 | Attachments | Mrs. Atkins | 2 episodes |
| 2002 | Murder in Mind | Sophie Cunningham | Episode: "Disposal" |
| 2002–2017 | Hollyoaks | Frankie Osborne | Series regular |
| 2013 | Cold | Blonde Woman | Film |
| 2013 | Sooty | Dame Helena Pearsona | Episode: "The Dance Competition" |
| 2017 | Lorna | Lorna | Short |
| 2018, 2021 | Doctors | Beth Rundle / Regan Hoffman | Episodes: "No Fury Like a Woman" and "The Unkindest Cut" |
| 2019 | Rome in Love | Vivien Daniels | Television film |
