= Miles Higson =

English actor (b. 1993)

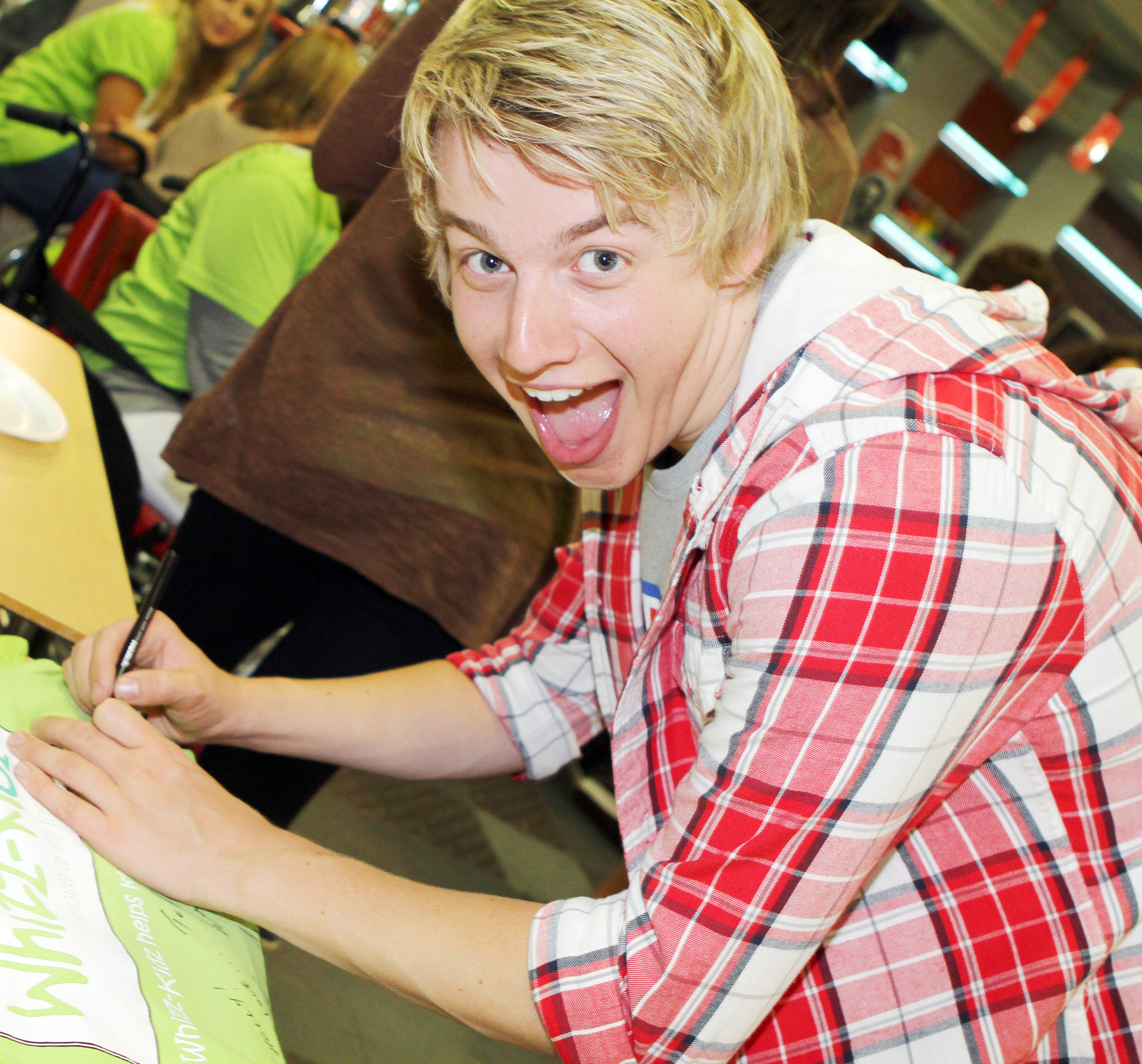
- Miles Higson in 2010
- Born: 27 March 1993 (age 33); London, England
- Occupation: Actor
- Years active: 2010–present

Miles Higson (born 27 March 1993) is an English actor, known for portraying the role of Seth Costello in the Channel 4 soap opera Hollyoaks from 2010 to 2011, and again from 2020 to 2021.

== Career and life ==
He studied for his A-Levels at Bacup and Rawtenstall Grammar School where he also took his GCSEs. He also attended the Manchester School Of Acting. Before landing his role in Hollyoaks he appeared in a short film with All Seeing Eye Productions. Higson formerly lived with co-stars Claire Cooper and Emmett J. Scanlan, a (now) married couple who were then playing Jacqui McQueen and Brendan Brady on Hollyoaks.

== Filmography ==
Year	Title	Role	Notes
2010	Six Minutes of Freedom	James	Short
2010–2011, 2020–2021	Hollyoaks	Seth Costello	Series regular
2011	Hollyoaks Later	Seth Costello	2 episodes
2015	Cucumber	Beanie	5 episodes
2018	Poof	Mike	Short
2019	Coronation Street	Blake	1 episode
