= Alice Barlow =

English actress and singer

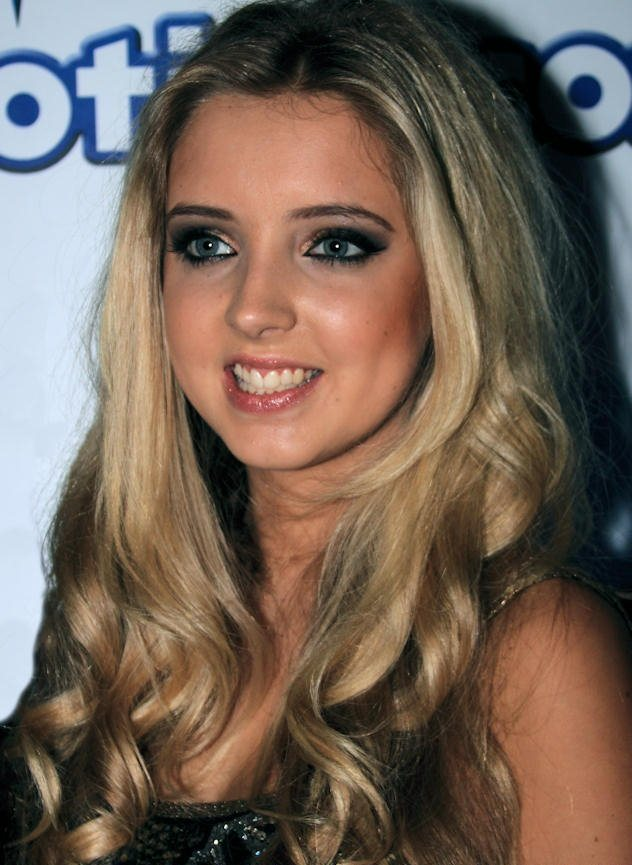
- Barlow at the Inside Soap Awards 2011
- Born: 9 August 1991 (age 35); Macclesfield, Cheshire, England
- Occupations: Actress; singer
- Years active: 2008–present

Alice Barlow (born 9 August 1991) is an English actress and singer. She portrayed Rae Wilson in the Channel 4 soap opera Hollyoaks between 2009 and 2011, and was a contestant on the second series of The Voice UK in 2013. She also appeared in the ITV sitcom Benidorm in 2015.

== Early life ==
Barlow was born on 9 August 1991 in Macclesfield, Cheshire, where attended The Fallibroome Academy.

== Career ==
While a teenager Barlow won a national talent search Festival4Stars. In 2008, Barlow took part 'The Stobart Factor' a talent competition, which was judged by The X Factor judge Louis Walsh. Walsh gave Barlow positive comments on her singing and told her she had "style". Barlow went on to win the competition and won £10,000, in which she put towards an Invisalign to straighten her teeth.

In October 2009, Barlow made her television debut as Rae Wilson in Channel 4's soap-opera, Hollyoaks. While in Hollyoaks, Barlow won an All About Soap award for "Best Love Triangle", along with Kieron Richardson and Emmett J. Scanlan. In early 2011, Barlow decided to leave the serial and her character was killed off in the late night spin-off Hollyoaks Later, which aired in September 2011. Barlow's departure was kept a secret until her exit scenes were aired. While starring in the show she also presented linked project The Hollyoaks Music Show. In 2012 Barlow secured the role of Bella in ITV drama series Crime Stories.

In February 2013, Digital Spy reported that Barlow had auditioned on the second series of The Voice UK and had got through to the next round with Danny O'Donoghue as her coach. Barlow was defeated in the battle rounds by Andrea Begley, the eventual winner of the series. Following her elimination from the talent contest Barlow vowed to continue her ambition of a career in music.

In July 2013, Barlow's management announced that she had secured the role of Sara in a new E4's comedy titled Drifters. In 2014, Barlow filmed a guest appearance for the medical drama Casualty. For 2015, Barlow secured a recurring role in ITV comedy Benidorm as Annie Redmond and a guest role in Russell T Davies' series Banana as Harriet.

In 2018, Barlow secured the role of Kat in the Dusty Springfield musical "Son Of A Preacher Man". In 2023, Barlow played Fiona in the BBC comedy series The Power of Parker. Barlow has subsequently began working as a wedding singer.

== Filmography ==
Year	Film	Role	Notes	Refs.
2009–2011	Hollyoaks	Rae Wilson	Regular role	
2011	Hollyoaks Later	Rae Wilson	Regular role	
2012	Crime Stories	Bella	Guest role	
2013–2016	Drifters	Sara	Recurring role	
2014	Casualty	Lucy	Guest role	
2014	Staff Room	Emma	Guest role	
2015	Benidorm	Annie	Recurring role	
2015	Banana	Harriet	Guest role	
2017	Coronation Street	Nancy Briers	Guest role	
2019	Doctors	Sally Seaborn	Guest role	
2019	Shakespeare & Hathaway: Private Investigators	Bianca Percy	Guest role	
2021	Betty		Guest role	
2022	Ten Percent	Chloe (Estate agent)	Guest role	
2023	The Power of Parker	Fiona	Guest role	
