= Joel Goonan =

English actor (b. 1989)

- Born: Joel Benjamin Goonan; 2 September 1989 (age 36); Manchester, England, United Kingdom
- Occupation: Actor
- Years active: 2001–present

Joel Benjamin Goonan (born 2 September 1989) is a British actor from Manchester, England, best known for his role as the villainous Gaz Bennett in the Channel 4 soap opera Hollyoaks.

Goonan had guest roles in Waterloo Road, Doctors and Casualty. Joel Goonan left Hollyoaks in August 2010 and returned in early January 2011.
