= Ashley Margolis =

British actor

- Born: Ashley Howard Margolis; 31 October 1993 (age 32); Bury, Greater Manchester, England
- Occupation: Actor
- Years active: 2002–present

Ashley Margolis (born 31 October 1993) is an English actor. Margolis began acting from an early age and secured his first stage role in 2002. From 2009 to 2012, he played the regular role of Ricky Campbell in the British soap opera Hollyoaks. After he left the series, Margolis continued to secure guest roles in British television shows and radio plays. Margolis has also pursued a theatre career and provided voice overs for video games. In 2023, he played the co-lead role in the short film Two Minutes, which won a British Film Institute award.

== Career ==
Margolis is originally from Whitefield, Greater Manchester and was born to parents, Lindy and Robert Margolis. He attended King David Primary School in Prestwich. Magolis' family were already involved in amateur dramatics and this led him into the profession. Aged six, Margolis played his first stage role for the musical Oliver! with the Jewish Theatre Company. Aged eight, he was attending the Oldham Theatre Workshop ran by David Johnson. Margolis secured his first prominent stage acting role in 2002. He played Chip in Disney national tour of Beauty and the Beast. He later enrolled at the Manchester Grammar School to complete his studies. It was during this time Margolis secured the regular role of the character, Ricky Campbell in the British soap opera Hollyoaks. He left the role in March 2012. From his experiences working on Hollyoaks, Margolis decided he wanted to further pursue acting and chose to leave. He became a jobbing actor and worked for providing voice overs for film and advertisements. He also secured work on Radio Four in their radio plays to gain a more varied acting experience and acted alongside Glenda Jackson and Ian McKellen. Margolis appeared with the latter in the radio series adaptation of Paradise Lost, playing Adam.

In 2013, he appeared as Josh in the BBC Three sitcom Some Girls. In 2014, he appeared as Todd Magellen in the soap opera, Doctors. In 2016, he appeared in the BBC period detective series, Father Brown as Jackie.

In June 2021, Margolis played the role of Owen Robeson in BBC drama series, Casualty. He also played the main role of Gary in the series, The VAR Room. In September 2021, he portrayed the role of Nick Meadows in an episode of Doctors. That year he also played Marcus in the film, A Christmas Number One.

In 2022, Margolis played the stage role of Liam Haber in The Arts Theatre's revival of Bad Jews. In 2023, Margolis played the co-lead role in the short film, Two Minutes. It received the "Audience Award for Best Short Film" at the 2024 BFI London Film Festival. In 2024, Margolis took the role of in crime drama series, Silent Witness. In early 2025, Margolis secured the role of Richard Dreyfuss in a national tour of the production, The Shark Is Broken. In September 2025, Margolis played Darwin in the stage production The Billionaire Inside Your Head at Hampstead Theatre.

== Personal life ==
Margolis married actress Kelly Clare on 11 August 2022.

== Filmography ==
=== Television ===
Year	Programme	Character	Notes
2009–2012	Hollyoaks	Ricky Campbell	Regular role
2011	Hollyoaks Later	Ricky Campbell	Regular role
2013	Some Girls	Josh	Guest role
2013	Living the Dream	Ashley	Film role
2014	Doctors	Todd Magellan	Guest role
2016	Father Brown	Jackie	Guest role
2016	Comedy Playhouse	Jacko	Guest role
2018	The City and the City	Vanya	Guest role
2019	Holby City	Brody Lyttle	Guest role
2020	So Awkward	Hugo	Guest role
2021	Casualty	Owen Robeson	Guest role
2021	The VAR Room	Gary	Regular role
2021	Doctors	Nick Meadows	Guest role
2021	A Christmas Number One	Marcus	Film role
2022	Vikingskool	Erik Fourchebarbe	Regular role
2023	Two Minutes	Gunman	Short film
2023	The Doll's House	Woody	Short film
2024	Silent Witness	Haidar Alam	Guest role
2024	Brassic	Colin	Guest role
2024	Still Life	Callum	Short film
TBA	Odd Squad	Kyronblixit	Guest role

=== Radio ===
Year	Programme	Character	Station
2015	Aliyah	Oscar	BBC Radio 4
2015	Blood, Sex and Money by Emile Zola	Silvere	BBC Radio 4
2016	Jezebel by Irene Nemirovsky	Bernard	BBC Radio 4
2017	Ann Veronica	Teddy	BBC Radio 4
2017	Val McDermid - Resistance	Will	BBC Radio 4
2017	The Book of Yehudit	Daniel	BBC Radio 4
2017	Human Resources	Trainee	BBC Radio 4
2017	MetaphorMoses	Matthew, Moishe	BBC Radio 4
2017	Hull 2017: Lamanby	Jeremy Wren	BBC Radio 4
2018	Paradise Lost	Adam	BBC Radio 4
2021	Women in Love	Loerke	BBC Radio 4
2022-2023	Trust	Tim	BBC Radio 4
2024	Franz and Felice	Franz	BBC Radio 4
2025	Lenin Forever!	Boris	BBC Radio 4
2025	Marcovaldo	Fiordaligi / Godifredo	BBC Radio 4

=== Video games ===
Year	Video game	Character	Notes
2015	The Book of Unwritten Tales 2	Timmy Mouskovitz	Voice
2016	Sherlock Holmes: The Devil's Daughter	Wiggins	Voice
2017	The Pillars of the Earth	Symond / Civilians	Voice
2017	Nine Parchments	Cornelius Crownsteed	Voice
2019	Blasphemous	Jocinero	Voice
2019	Trine 4: The Nightmare Prince	Cornelius Crownsteed	Voice
2020	Demon's Souls	Playable Fighter	Voice

=== Theatre ===
Year	Play	Character	Theatre
2022	Bad Jews	Liam Haber	The Arts Theatre
2022	The Band's Visit	Telephone Guy	Donmar Warehouse
2025	The Shark Is Broken	Richard Dreyfuss	UK & Ireland Tour
2025	The Billionaire Inside Your Head	Darwin	Hampstead Theatre
