= Dean Aspen =

British actor

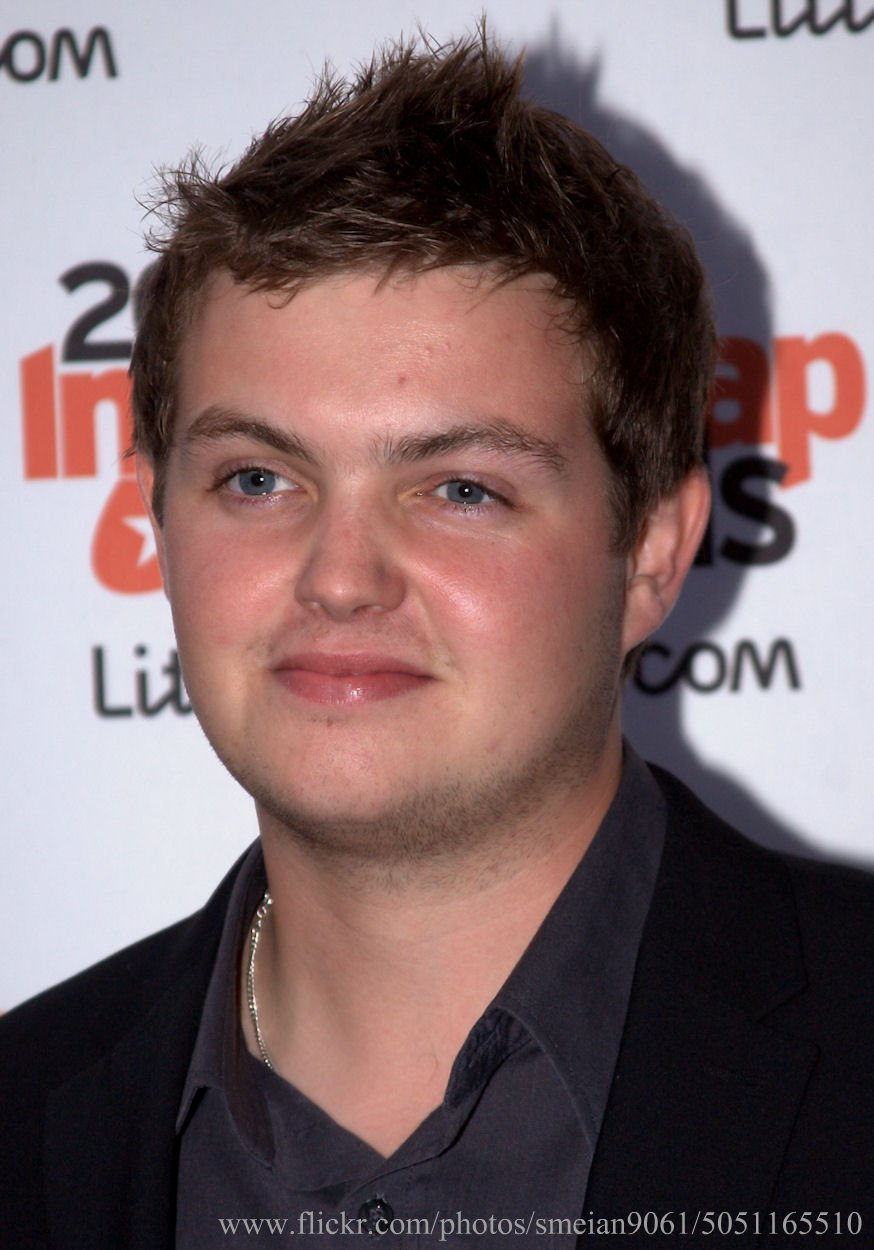
- Occupations: Actor, entrepreneur

Dean Aspen is an English actor known for playing Duncan Button in Hollyoaks.

His first screen acting role was in 2008 as Scaly Dave in The Revenge Files of Alistair Fury and then in November 2009 he began playing the role of Duncan in Hollyoaks. Aspen has had to try to appear younger by shaving frequently in order to play a character six years his junior, and he has also lost considerable weight for the part.

Aspen was born in Manchester. While at school Aspen performed in many productions, and studied drama at Cheadle and Marple Sixth Form College, as well as performing in productions with the Salford Quays company. He left sixth form with a solid B in A Level Drama. At college he was involved with The National Theatre Connections Programme (principally as a roadie). Aspen was a part of the Northern Gap Theatre between 2006–2007 and is now represented by Bloomsfields Management.
