= Rhys Ashworth =

Fictional character from Hollyoaks

- Hollyoaks character
- Andrew Moss as Rhys Ashworth (2012)
- Portrayed by: Andrew Moss
- Duration: 2005–2012, 2014
- First appearance: 26 September 2005
- Last appearance: 11 August 2014
- Introduced by: David Hanson (2005); Bryan Kirkwood (2014)
- Spin-off appearances: Hollyoaks Later (2008–2009); Hollyoaks: The Morning After the Night Before (2009); Hollyoaks: King of Hearts (2010)
In-universe information
- Occupation: Barman (2008–12); Waiter (2012)
- Family: Ashworth; McQueen
- Father: Noel Ashworth
- Mother: Suzanne Ashworth
- Half-brothers: Josh Ashworth; Jack Osborne
- Half-sisters: Hannah Ashworth; Beth Clement; Francine Osborne
- Wife: Jacqui McQueen (2011–2012)
- Daughters: Katy O'Connor
- Adoptive daughters: Phoebe McQueen
- Grandfathers: Bill Ashworth
- Grandmothers: Rose Dick
- Uncles: Neville Ashworth
- First cousins: Jamie Fletcher

Rhys Ashworth is a fictional character from the British Channel 4 soap opera Hollyoaks, played by Andrew Moss. He made his first on-screen appearance in September 2005. Rhys was killed off in the Enjoy The Ride storyline in an episode airing on 15 November 2012 and the character departed on 16 November 2012. Rhys made a return on 27 June 2014 as part of his ex-girlfriend Cindy Cunningham's (Stephanie Waring) storyline about her bipolar disorder.

== Character creation and casting ==
In 2004, Jo Hallows stepped down from her position as series producer at Hollyoaks and it was announced that David Hanson would succeed her in the role. In 2005, it was revealed that Hanson would introduce a new family to the series: the Ashworths consisting of father Neville Ashworth (Jim Millea), mother Suzanne (Suzanne Hall), son Josh (Sonny Flood), daughter Hannah (Emma Rigby), family friend Gilly Roach (Anthony Quinlan) and son Rhys. It was announced that television newcomer Andrew Moss had been cast as Rhys.

In January 2010, it was announced that Lucy Allan had stepped down from the position of series producer and that Paul Marquess had taken over the role. It was soon revealed that Marquess planned to give Hollyoaks a "shake up", changing the productions team and beginning a cast cull by axing three established characters: Neville, Suzanne and Josh Ashworth. As well as the axings, Emma Rigby, who played Hannah, had chosen to quit the previous year, bowing out in February 2010. However, it was revealed that the character of Rhys would stay in the series after his on-screen family's departure along with Duncan Button (Dean Aspen), the family's godson. In July 2009, in an interview with soap website Holy Soap Moss revealed that exits of his on-screen family were sad, he commented, "It's really strange. We all started together. It was brilliant to come to a show like this as part of a family unit. You don't feel like you're on your own."

== Development ==
In 2010 Rhys embarked on a "surprise" relationship with Jacqui McQueen (Claire Cooper). Moss first hinted at their romance months prior stating: "I think Rhys is going to fall in love again. It's a character already in the village. It's quite surprising. It's a character who's been here for a while." The relationship proved popular with viewers, during an interview with Digital Spy, Cooper spoke of her original lack of optimism she and Moss had towards the pairing, stating: "When the relationship first started, we didn't know how they were going to gel and how it was going to work, because people were such fans of Jacqui and Tony. Some people still ask me if those two are going to get back together, but people are really taken with Rhys and Jacqui." Cooper believes it's her own working relationship with Moss that helps make the pairing a success stating: "It's a nice collaboration and we try to make it funny, emotional, hard-hitting, three-dimensional and as interesting for the audience as possible." She also adopted a "couple name" for the pair titled "Ja-Rhys".

Rhys and Jacqui were given one of the biggest storylines for the first half of 2011 in the serial, of this Marquess stated: "They have got the biggest story for the first half of 2011. I think it may be one of the biggest stories in Hollyoaks history. It's very, very serious and I think it will really divide the audience. It will really test them and their relationship to the nth degree, and we'll see whether they can recover from it."

== Storylines ==
=== 2005–2012 ===
Rhys first appears as a person who comes to inspect his family's new home due to the Hunter family selling up. Rhys decides the house is right for the family and moves his belongings into the biggest bedroom so his best friend Gilly can stay with the family. Rhys looks for courses at the local college but he isn't impressed with them. They both look around the college and find the girls sports team and volunteer to help their tutor Kathy Barnes with her students. Rhys meets Sarah Barnes (Loui Batley) and she lies to him, claiming that she is a student teacher. They begin dating, without Rhys realising she is a schoolgirl and the same age as Hannah. Sarah and Hannah are befriended and it is revealed that Sarah was only at the college because Kathy, her mum was there. Rhys finds out the truth about Sarah when she has a study session with Hannah. Rhys, disgusted by her lies, dumps her. Rhys and Sarah reunite but Kathy is displeased with the romance and vows to end it. Hatching a plan to break the pair up, she ends up bedding Rhys.

A disgusted Sarah becomes aware of Rhys cheating with her mum and refuses to see him anymore. Despite that, they get back together again, for a third time, much to the disturbance of Kathy and Hannah. Rhys and Gilly's friendship suffers because of the on/off fling and Rhys becomes worried when Sarah talks about holidays and living together. Rhys is jealous when Sarah and Craig Dean (Guy Burnet) begin to grow close and he accuses her of seducing other men. Sarah texts Rhys constantly for forgiveness and she sees him in the pub, thinking he was with another girl she accused him of having an affair. Rhys then decides to end their relationship but Sarah offers him a casual relationship, which he accepts, however she was unhappy with the agreement. Rhys takes naked photos of Sarah on his phone and boasted to Darren Osborne (Ashley Taylor Dawson). Going to the toilet, he leaves his phone on the table and Darren sends the photos to the SU Bar and publishes it in a lads magazine. Sarah discovers about the photos and finally, finishes with Rhys for good. Rhys is green-eyed of Gilly Roach (Anthony Quinlan)and Sarah's growing relationship. Rhys and Gilly have an argument and Gilly reveals his fling with Kathy at her birthday party. Rhys and Gilly fall out and Sarah, annoyed by the arguing friends, begins seeing Craig. Sarah gets increasingly drunk at Hannah's birthday party and ends up kissing Rhys. Craig sees them and attacks Rhys. Rhys thought Sarah still wanted him but he realised that she had moved on. Rhys began meeting a mysterious older woman after getting a job as a male escort to earn money. Rhys helped Gilly get a job at the agency but it didn't work out.

Rhys participates in a dating game with Zoe Carpenter (Zoë Lister). Zoe selects Rhys and an attraction between the pair grows. Rhys tries to be with her but Will Hackett (Oliver Farnworth) who is obsessed with Zoe, sends texts from her phone to Rhys making her look possessive. After reading the texts, Rhys told Zoe he wanted nothing to do with her. A series of things happened, leading to Zoe and Rhys being blamed, however they found out that it was Will who was responsible for the harassment.

Rhys discovers that Neville's brother Noel (Craig Cheetham) is his biological father after his mother was sleeping with him while having a marriage with Neville. Noel returned to try to bond with Rhys when he only had a few months to live. Rhys told him he wasn't interested, as he considered Neville his father. Rhys met Beth Clement (Sinéad Moynihan) when she fell underneath his car. Rhys became attracted to her and offered to take her to a concert and they started casually dating. Rhys wanted to take it slow and wanted to please Beth, however she wanted action and they had sex. Rhys becomes worried when Beth ignores his texts and calls but Beth replied and stopped contacting him. Rhys was devastated when Noel died of cancer and on the day of his funeral, Rhys stopped contacting Beth and decided to terminate their relationship.

Josh managed to persuade Rhys to go to Noel's wake. There, Neville met Rhys' half-sister, a young woman that none of the family had ever been aware of. Neville thought it best to introduce Rhys to her. Rhys and Beth were being introduced to each other as half-brother and sister. Rhys ordered Beth to leave town, but she refused. She began to get to know his family, and Gilly. Rhys tried to get used to her presence in his life, but he still loved her, thus sending him into fury when he saw her flirting with other men. He told Beth the family hated her and to just leave them alone, but his mother told him not to speak to Beth that way. Beth and Gilly became romantically involved with each other. Rhys recommenced his relationship with Sarah, although it remained clear from both Rhys and Beth's behaviour that they still loved each other. Sarah told Beth that she did not believe Rhys had strong feelings for her. Beth suggested she do what she thought was best. Sarah then left Rhys. Rhys and Beth have an argument after Rhys found out that Beth had advised Sarah to dump him. After going home, Rhys realised how much he has fallen for her and the illicit pair failed to resist each other. They tried to forget about it the next day and when Gilly revealed that he was going travelling to Thailand, Beth decided to go with him but not before she and Rhys confessed their feelings to each other and Rhys tried to persuade her to run away with him to Spain. However, despite Rhys' efforts, Beth felt it would be wrong and left for Thailand with Gilly.

Rhys started a relationship with Mercedes McQueen after the Mr. Hollyoaks competition. Rhys was working when Mercedes came to the shop and flirted with him, with Russ Owen (Stuart Manning) finding them. Rhys' feelings for Beth grow stronger when she returns from Thailand with Gilly. Gilly asked Beth to marry him, but Rhys and Beth passionately kissed and began an affair. Rhys told Beth he found it to hard to betray Gilly and they both agreed that they would have to run away together.

Despite Rhys wanting to be with Beth, Hannah gets depressed following her dumping by Danny, and asks Rhys to stay with her so she doesn't start binge eating again. He instantly responds and says he will stay with her to look after his sister. Rhys later tells Beth he cannot go just yet and Beth is slightly abrupt towards this, but helps by taking Hannah out for a drink. Rhys was having a tough time watching Beth and Gilly plan their wedding but is trying to be responsible, pointing out that Gilly doesn't deserve to be betrayed like this, however his love for Beth enables him to be firm with her when she insists on continuing their affair. Michaela McQueen (Hollie-Jay Bowes) then discovered Rhys and Beth's affair after seeing them kissing and told Josh the next day. He initially believes her when he sees Rhys and Beth flirting but when he asks them if they are sleeping together Rhys tells him not to be so sick and tells him not to speak to Michaela again. Josh agrees as he feels guilty for believing her and when she visits the Ashworth house Rhys, Beth and Josh kick her out.

Rhys and Beth meet and confront one another. Rhys tells Beth that despite how much he loves her, he had to do the right thing, and he terminated the affair before anyone else could find out. Rhys however did rekindle his affair with Beth and Gilly discovers the affair after a family meal out. The entire Ashworth family were shocked and stunned by the revelations. Beth is thrown out of the house and Rhys leaves with her. Rhys and Beth are arrested when Gilly calls the police about their relationship. Rhys and Beth are questioned by the police and told to appear in court the next day. They decide to run away together and start a new life rather than face going to prison. Rhys returns home to get his passport and the family catches him and Beth. Suzanne begs for Rhys to stay.

Rhys takes the keys to the camper van that Gilly gives him. Rhys and Beth then leave the family and drive off. Rhys takes his attention off the road and they crash head-on with a truck. The Ashworth's rush to the hospital when they hear Rhys has been in accident. The doctor tells Gilly that Beth died at the scene. Rhys wakes up and asks about Beth and is told she is dead. Rhys is devastated by the news. Rhys returns home from the hospital but the family are not very pleased to see him and so he decides to visit Beth's parents' home to sort out the funeral arrangements. Rhys returns home after a few weeks. Josh and Gilly are not pleased to see him and move out. Rhys makes up with Gilly and both him and Josh move back home. Rhys and Josh made up after agreeing to put the past behind them.

Rhys meets Zak Ramsey's (Kent Riley) sister Hayley (Kelly-Marie Stewart) in the pub. She gave Rhys her phone number and they arrange a date. Rhys came to the halls to find out where Hayley was for the date, and when he found out shes in a wheelchair he decided not go on the date. Rhys was confronted by Zak where he forced Rhys to confront Hayley. Rhys had a problem with Hayley's disability. However, whenever Rhys and Hayley are together they have an attraction and become more attached to one another. Rhys joined a band called The Somethings with Kris Fisher as their manager. Kris became the bands agent and they needed a female lead singer and so put a competition called Voice Idol on the student radio he runs, where women send in voice clips of them singing then the band decided which on they liked the best. However, the best person sent their voice clip anonymously. Rhys tries to make sure Hayley is not the lead singer however they make up and start a relationship. Rhys becomes attracted to India Longford (Beth Kingston) however Josh also likes her. Josh punches Rhys after he thinks he is flirting with India. Josh goes for a night out with his friends at the loft, and as a joke Rhys pours vodka in Josh's orange juice, unaware that Josh is going to be driving. When Josh leaves with India, Dave, and Sasha, Rhys races after them but arrives too late. Josh crashes the car but makes it out alive with Sasha and Dave, however India is trapped in the car but is pulled out by Rhys. Josh is arrested for being over the limit. After the incident Josh doesn't understand how he was over the limit and as all his friends and family turn their backs on him, Rhys feels guilty but doesn't own up to what he has done. Josh is nearly given a prison sentence but is let off with a driving ban and alcohol awareness meetings. India decides not to forgive Josh and realises she has feelings for Rhys. Josh punches Rhys when he suspects somethings going on later Rhys and India begin a relationship which is short-lived when Rhys realises his brother needs him. Rhys tells Calvin Valentine (Ricky Whittle) that he was the one who spiked Josh's drink. Josh crashes another car after getting drunk as it is he's second offense he is sent to prison, Rhys does nothing to confess that he was the one who actually spiked Josh's drink.

Rhys discovers his mother Suzanne's affair with Darren behind Neville's back when he catches them in the act kissing and undressing. Rhys is disgusted and attacks Darren. Rhys tells Neville about Suzanne's affair who kicks her out, the day after Josh is released. Neville forgives Suzanne for her affair on the condition they emigrate to Spain without Josh. Rhys admits to spiking Josh's drink as he can't hold his guilt any longer. Josh forgives him and Rhys tells him to go to Spain with the family in his place.

Rhys says a tearful goodbye to his family and stays in the village. Rhys stays in the pub until the new owner Carl Costello (Paul Opacic) arrives. Duncan returns from Spain and asks Rhys if he can stay with him in the village, Rhys agrees and they move into Darren's flat. Rhys along with Jacqui McQueen (Claire Cooper) then gets a job at Chez Chez, a new bar that is owned by Cheryl Brady (Bronagh Waugh) and her half brother Brendan Brady (Emmett J. Scanlan). Rhys then asks Jack Osborne (Jimmy McKenna) if Duncan can move in with him as he knows that it is hard to live without a family. Jack agrees and asks Darren to move in with him as well as he realised that he is really Duncan's close friend from heart.

When Rhys starts internet dating under the name Fun2bewith he ends up talking to a woman under the name of Sweetiepie however once they meet up he realises that woman is actually Jacqui. Rhys and Jacqui are unpleasantly shocked. However, this event does not stop Cheryl who continuously devises plans to get them together. She orders Rhys to find Jacqui after she tells him that she had lost the key to the loft (this was a lie). Rhys finds Jacqui, who is babysitting Tom Cunningham (Ellis Hollins). They eventually bond while playing virtual tennis and share a kiss. Later, Rhys begins developing feelings for Jacqui after and he asks her to move in with him after she leaves Myra's place following a disagreement. She begins seeing Brendan's friend Danny making Rhys feel really jealous, enough to seduce her before one of their dates but after sleeping with him she leaves for the date anyway. They awkwardly avoid one another the next day. Later, they share another kiss, but Danny catches them in the act and Rhys later gets mugged of the keys after locking up the club by Danny. Jacqui later dumps Danny by voicemail and the two start a relationship. They go back to Rhys' flat and Danny is sitting on the sofa. Danny begins to intimidate the pair to which Rhys tries to stand up to him but ends up getting knocked out. Once Danny has gone Jacqui and Rhys continue to celebrate being together however Jacqui tells him they should wait before they tell anyone, not wanting to get their families involved or annoy Danny any further. After Danny tells Rhys that Jacqui slept with him, Rhys has sex with Cheryl, but he later finds out that Jacqui did not sleep with Danny. When Jacqui finds out about his infidelity she ends their relationship.

Upset that Rhys slept with Cheryl, Jacqui kisses Gilly however he supposedly rapes her when she does not want to go any further. Jacqui tells Rhys but Gilly denies it, causing Rhys to struggle to choose who he believes, and he proposes to Jacqui at the trial but she says no. However, when Gilly leaves the Hollyoaks after being found 'not guilty' she agrees to marry Rhys. She then from advice from Tony she goes round to his house and proposes to him and he says yes. After some time apart they eventually marry. Rhys and Jacqui's marriage starts to hit rock bottom when they have an argument and Jacqui leaves and never returned the next day. Rhys fears that something has happened to her and goes look for her. When her family says they haven't seen her they all fear for the worst and look for her in the woods. Rhys and Jacqui make up for good and with help of getting dog, Terry, they become closer even having sex for the first time since the rape. Gilly returns to the village just as Rhys and Jacqui are beginning to put the past behind them. Jacqui and Rhys struggle to deal with Gilly being back which leads them to plan to move to Cornwall. Gilly goes to see Rhys and Jacqui at their flat where he admits he unknowingly raped Jacqui and leaves so they don't have to.

Rhys and Jacqui struggle with money so get a lodger Ally Gorman (Dan O'Connor) to help with the bills. When Mercedes, Jacqui's sister, becomes depressed after her fiancé Riley Costello (Rob Norbury) with their son Bobby Costello (Jakob Chialton) leaves her Rhys goes to help her out however Mercedes kisses him and when he tells Jacqui he unknowingly causes a rift between the sisters. Rhys begins a passionate affair with Cindy Cunningham (Stephanie Waring). Myra witnesses them kiss and tells Rhys to end the affair or she will tell Jacqui. Cindy ends the relationship with Rhys, when Tony loses his eyesight following an off-screen crash in the fated mini-bus. Cindy realises she wants to instead be with her fiancé Tony Hutchinson (Nick Pickard). Cindy and Rhys kiss, which she tells him is a way of saying goodbye as she loves Tony. Tony witnesses this, as he had recovered his eyesight, although Cindy is unaware of this.

Rhys plans to leave Hollyoaks village, which Myra discovers. She asks him to stay for the double wedding of Cindy and Tony and Doug Carter (PJ Brennan) and Ste Hay (Kieron Richardson) so Jacqui will not be upset at the service before he then leaves. Cindy and Tony marry but Cindy asks Rhys to take her with him (witnessed by Tony); he agrees seconds before Maddie Morrison (Scarlett Bowman) and the accompanying sixth formers crash into the wedding venue after the brakes failing the mini van and having to swerve to avoid hitting Ste's daughter, Leah. Rhys appears to be fine until part of the building gives way and he is stuck under a girder. After trying to release him, a paramedic tells Jacqui that he needs a fire crew to cut him free. She asks how long before they are there and the paramedic tells her that it will take 10 minutes, but because he has severed a main artery, he doesn't have that long to live. Rhys apologises to Jacqui before dying in her arms. In late 2012, Sinead O'Connor (Stephanie Davis) visits Rhys' graveyard and says that he is the father of her unborn child Katy O'Connor.

=== 2014 ===
A hallucination of Rhys appears from 27 June as part of Cindy's bipolar disorder storyline. They made a plan to leave the country after Cindy hid lottery ticket money from rightful owners: Blessing Chambers (Modupe Adeyeye) and the McQueens. Cindy buried the money and Rhys shouted and criticized her when she couldn't find it. Mercedes McQueen (Jennifer Metcalfe) slapped her when she found Cindy with the money and later got her arrested for theft. When Mercedes dropped the charges, Cindy kept on seeing Rhys and before they left, they kidnapped Dee Dee Hutchinson mistaking her for Katy. As they were leaving, Rhys was hit by a bus, upsetting Cindy.

== Reception ==
At the 2013 National Television Awards Moss was nominated in the category of "Serial Drama Performance". Inside Soap critic Sarah said that during the Enjoy The Ride storyline "there are standout performances from some of my all-time favourite Hollyoaks stars, including [...] Andrew Moss". All About Soap journalist Kerry Barrett said viewers should "watch out for Andrew Moss" amongst other cast members "who all act their socks off", while her colleague Carena Crawford said she was shocked at Rhys' death AfterElton.com's Anthony D. Langford said he was not "shocked" at Rhys' death but that he "was sorry to see him go". Langford said that he could see why the serial "had to kill him off because they had basically written the character into a corner". He said that he did not understand why the serial decided to take Rhys in the direction they did, explaining that after "everything that he and Jacqui had been through [...] it made no sense for Rhys to throw what had been a strong marriage away on a fling with Cindy [...] I never bought for a minute that he would not only have an affair with her, but fall in 'love' with her and want to leave Jacqui for her. It was bad writing and totally out of character". He opined that the scenes of Rhys "sneaking around" to meet with Cindy were "appalling" and that he "kept thinking that 'Rhys would never do that' during the entire storyline". Langford concluded that Moss and Cooper "were beautiful and heartbreaking in those moments, reminding you of the love and connection that they had for much of their relationship. The fact that Rhys had been inexplicably cheating on Jacqui the whole time took away from how powerful those scenes could have and should have been".

An All About Soap writer included Rhys and Beth's' incest plot in their list of "top ten taboos" stories list. They assessed that it was one of the "taboos which have bravely been broken by soaps." They added that Rhys and Beth "seemed like a good match until they discovered they shared the same dad!". Hollyoaks placed Rhys and Beth's relationship first on their "Top 10 Most Awkward Dating Moments in Hollyoaks History" compilation.
