= Hayley Ramsey =

UK soap opera character, created 2009

- Hollyoaks character
- Portrayed by: Kelly-Marie Stewart
- Duration: 2009–2010
- First appearance: 28 January 2009
- Last appearance: 29 January 2010
- Created by: Bryan Kirkwood
- Introduced by: Bryan Kirkwood
In-universe information
- Occupation: Student
- Brothers: Caleb Ramsey; Zak Ramsey
- Sons: Caleb Ramsey

Hayley Ramsey is a fictional character from the British Channel 4 soap opera Hollyoaks, played by Kelly-Marie Stewart. She made her first on-screen appearance on 28 January 2009 as the sister of already established character Zak Ramsey (Kent Riley). Hayley is notably the first prominent disabled character in Hollyoaks, and like Stewart, has Guillain–Barré syndrome. In December 2009, it was announced that Stewart's real-life pregnancy would be written into the show and that Hayley would become pregnant. Making her final on-screen appearance on 29 January 2010, the character did not return after Stewart's maternity leave ended.

== Creation ==
=== Background ===
The character of Hayley was in development for over 18 months prior to filming. The casting was made public in December 2008 along with details of the character, revealing she was to be the sister of already established character Zak Ramsey. The character's back history with Zak is that of a close brother and sister relationship, but at the time of Hayley's condition developing, he could not deal with it and thought she would need constant care.

=== Casting ===
Auditions were held for the part of a new disabled character in 2007. Initially there was males and females that auditioned for the role. After a long audition process actress Kelly-Marie Stewart and two other actresses, all of whom were wheelchair users were in the running for the part. Stewart was offered the role in August 2008. The casting process had taken nearly 18 months and producers created the Character of Hayley for Stewart, they also had to write all the scripts before she began filming in November 2008. The actress has Guillain–Barré syndrome like her character and stated she hopes to walk again one day. She spoke of how it is her dream role and she hopes to break down the barriers for disabled people: "Some people find it hard speaking to disabled people but hopefully I am showing I am just a normal girl like all the others on the show."

== Development ==
=== Personality and identity ===
Hayley's character has been described as a "bubbly, fun-loving practical joker". Actress Kelly-Marie Stewart also said of her character: "Hayley's very feisty and has the right attitude that if anyone is not cool enough to see her for who she actually is, it's their problem, not hers." Speaking on how her character's personality would be received Stewart said: "I think I'm quite lucky because she is, although she's feisty and although she stands up for herself, she is quite a nice character, so hopefully the things should be quite positive." The official Hollyoaks website described the fact that she has proven she can look out for herself despite her disability.

=== Disability ===
Some of the character's on-screen storylines have seen her disability come under fire and receiving unfair treatment, as the character progressed it was evident she could stand up for herself and does not take kindly to people judging her. Stewart was keen to portray the character as real as possible and made sure that scripts included her out of her wheelchair in scenes including sitting on couches and chairs. Set designers also made the sets accessible for Stewart so Hayley could be seen moving around independently while on-screen, with all of one set being converted. On-screen the character has had storylines involving verbal abuse of her condition when Rhys Ashworth didn't realise that she was in a wheelchair, Stewart said that it was a positive message the character was giving out as it meant that people can get to know a person without just thinking they are indifferent because of a wheelchair. Although Rhys then avoided her and said it was because she was disabled, Stewart spoke about the reaction and abuse, stating it was unfair treatment. Speaking about how her condition fitted in with her character she said: "Hayley is going to fall into things quite normally, she'll become part of the furniture. She actually ends up with a love interest. It just had to be addressed initially in the same was as any other new character's background would be."

== Storylines ==
Hayley first appears when she clashes with Michaela McQueen (Hollie-Jay Bowes), who assumes she is sleeping with Zak. However, Hayley soon reveals that she is Zak's sister. She then sleeps with Archie Carpenter (Stephen Beard). She later wants to find a date when Zak, believing that she cannot get one by herself, pays Elliot Bevan (Garnon Davies) money to make her feel special. However, she later finds out. An angry Hayley runs over Zak's foot and keeps the money for herself. Later in the month, she secures a date with Rhys Ashworth (Andrew Moss), who is initially unaware she is a wheelchair user. On discovering this, Rhys does not appear. Hayley joins a band called 'The Somethings'. After arguing with Rhys, Josh Ashworth (Sonny Flood) tells them to either sort it out or they are both out of the band. After leaving them alone for a short while, Josh and Kris Fisher (Gerard McCarthy) find Hayley and Rhys kissing and undressing each other. Soon after, Hayley and the band are approached by a manager. Josh fires Hayley, thinking the manager dislikes her due to her disability. However, Josh is in fact wrong.

After Hayley and Rhys finally get together, she begins to have feelings for Josh. Hayley eventually dumps Rhys after he begins talking about their future, her excuse being he was moving too fast for her. Hayley remains living in the student halls, and in September is joined by new students Dave Colburn (Elliot James Langridge), India Longford (Beth Kingston), Charlotte Lau (Amy Yamazaki) and Josh himself. Hayley takes an instant dislike to India, feeling she is judging her. Hayley tries to cheer India up after she sleeps with Archie, but ends up making the situation worse and embarrassing India even more. Hayley accuses India of stealing her food from the refrigerator, and in an attempt to catch her out, laces her food with laxatives. After India and Dave eat the food to wind Hayley up, the five students compete in a competition to win a car by touching it for the most time. The students are all in the car when India soils herself, causing the other four to get out, and India to subsequently win despite massive embarrassment. After returning from a Christmas break, Hayley reveals that she is five months pregnant, and denies either Rhys or Josh being the father. Hayley then leaves to live with her family. She later gives birth off-screen to a baby boy, who she named Caleb, after her older brother Caleb (Michael Ryan) who died in Afghanistan.

== Reception ==
Disability Now, a magazine aimed at disabled people praised Hollyoaks for writing in Stewart's real life pregnancy into her storylines, also adding it was positive they treat her like any other member of the cast. They also criticised her character along with fellow disabled characters from other UK soap operas including, Adam Best (David Proud), Lizzie Lakely (Kitty McGeever) and Izzy Armstrong (Cherylee Houston) for all being portrayed as vengeful and personality-driven, stating that the soap opera's need to portray some disabled character's as 'normal' good people. However they praised Hayley as being the least troubled character of Adam and Lizzie, despite the amount of onscreen enemies she made. Jerome Taylor from The Independent wrote that Stewart "made waves as the first permanent member of Hollyoaks to have a disability".

Ruth Deller of entertainment website Lowculture praised Hayley's storylines and personality stating: "Amidst all the dross, it's worth pointing out there are some things Hollyoaks is doing well. Clumsy storylining aside, it's good to see a disabled actress and disabled character in a mainstream show, and due to the fact she can actually act and seems to have a personality (the opposite to Spencer) she's even achieved the near-impossible feat of making brother Zak seem somewhat likeable."
