= Will Hackett =

UK soap opera character, created 2006

- Hollyoaks character
- Portrayed by: Oliver Farnworth
- Duration: 2006–2007
- First appearance: 1 September 2006
- Last appearance: 4 May 2007
- Introduced by: Bryan Kirkwood
In-universe information
- Occupation: Student

William "Will" Hackett is a fictional character from the British Channel 4 soap opera Hollyoaks, played by Oliver Farnworth. The character first appeared on-screen on 1 September 2006 until 4 May 2007. He was noted for portraying storylines involving mental illness and stalking his girlfriend Zoe Carpenter (Zoë Lister).

== Storylines ==
Will was revealed as a child genius by Gilly Roach (Anthony Quinlan) as he was a contestant on Countdown at 15 years old and seen as a child prodigy. He was also fast-tracked into Oxford University at 16 but dropped out due to complications. Now at HCC with a second chance, Will is extremely moody and keeps himself to himself but has developed obsessive feelings for Zoe Carpenter (Zoë Lister). He tried to win her affection but she turned him down; he has since tried more devious means of winning her praise by trying to sabotage her new relationship with Zak Ramsey (Kent Riley). When Zak and Zoe made up, Will broke into her bedroom and hid some of her possessions. He framed Zak for this, causing Zoe to dump Zak. Will then "bugged" Zoe's bedroom, but saw more than he bargained for when Zoe rekindled her new-found interest in nudism with flatmate Kris Fisher (Gerard McCarthy). Zak flirts with Zoe and they got cosy. Zak walked into the kitchen where Will was cooking something on the stove. Zak bent down to get something out of the cupboard, so Will twisted the handle round. Zak stood up and the food went flying, burning Zak's arm.

Will is not beyond manipulating people as long as it benefits or amuses him. Within several days of arriving at HCC, he placed the recently deceased Olivia Johnson's (Rochelle Gadd) diary in the room of her friend Jessica Harris (Jennifer Biddall), knowing that Olivia said some cruel things about Jessica inside. Will only came clean after Jessica had accused all of their other flatmates. Recently, he stole then ex-girlfriend Zoe's mobile phone and sent a vast number of increasingly possessive texts to Rhys Ashworth (Andrew Moss), in order to put Rhys off from dating Zoe after she dumped him after a dating game. He also changed results on a blood test belonging to Kris, giving Kris the impression he had HIV. This led to Kris feeling like his 'life was over', but nobody suspected him because he was very supportive to Kris. Will got increasingly obsessed with Zod and she was about to leave him so he therefore sabotaged Zoe's trip to New York City. As she was about to leave in the taxi to the airport Will hid her passport, then trapped Zoe's arm in the taxi's door, forcing her to go to A&E and thereby missing her flight. After returning from the hospital, and being under the effects of pain killers and alcohol, a depressed Zoe accuses Will of deliberately sabotaging her chances of going to New York.

Later in the student bar, Will manipulates Jessica to go talk to Zoe for him and convince her that he didn't deliberately hurt her hand. Will then spies on Jessica and Zoe in Zoe's room using his hidden web camera and overhears them gossiping about him. Jessica's remarks of Will being desperate and Zoe revealing intimate and embarrassing gossip about her and Will's sex life reduce Will to angry tears. Will later tells Jessica that Zoe was bitching about her and Kris and that causes a massive argument. He spies on Zoe on the webcam and notices she has a bottle of pop beside her bed and some tablets. Zoe later left the bottle of pop on the kitchen workplace, which he then spiked. Will then steals her mobile phone and texts Rhys, and bombards him with even more "pushy" text messages. He then texts Zak, telling him to meet her an hour later in the pub.

Kris eventually tried to make friends with Zoe and went to find her, only to find her drunk. Zoe tries to reassure Kris that she has just had the one drink, but he refuses to believe it and leaves. Zak finally meets Zoe an hour later than arranged but she tries to tell him that she didn't send the text message. Zak later puts her to bed to sleep but Will is watching this on his webcam, and creeps into her room. He scatters the pills around the room and on the bed and places the packet in her hand. He then looks at her, and says "Why did you have to betray me?" and leaves.

In the morning, Zak finds Zoe with the pills in her hand and instantly thinks she's attempted suicide. Kris walks by and tries to help, and Will walks in the room, and pretends to look surprised. Jessica and Kris feel bad about the way they have treated Zoe and she goes into a coma. When she comes back from hospital the students don't know how to cope with her. Zoe moves some of the furniture in her room around, which was bad news for Will as he was scared she could discover the webcam. He tries to load the screen up on his laptop, only to be rumbled by Zak. Zak runs straight into Zoe's room to share his suspicions with her. Zak tries to convince Zoe that Will has "something to hide" on his laptop, and suggests he's a stalker. Zoe freaks out and agrees to get the laptop. She later gets the laptop by setting off the college fire alarm and going into Will's room when he's evacuated. It later gets stolen by Michaela McQueen (Hollie-Jay Bowes) and Sonny Valentine (Devon Anderson), who sell it to Gilly, only for it to be retrieved by Kris. Zak gets it off Kris and they both guess the password but soon realise that Will has been filming Zoe with a hidden camera.

Meanwhile, Zoe goes back to the flat as she forgot her train tickets and overhears an argument she had with Zak a few days before. She walks into Will's room, puzzled, and finds him watching a video clip of her crying on a television. He looks round and locks her in the room and tells her he loves her. There is then a violent struggle, with Will continually telling Zoe he is doing this because he loves her. Zoe tries to escape numerous times but Will twists her broken arm. He admits he drugged her and after more violent struggles, he drags her up the stairs and onto the roof, and dangles her over the edge, only to be seen by Zak down below. Zak panics and rushes to the roof as quick as he possibly can. Will tells him to 'back off' repeatedly and tells Zoe he never meant to hurt her, with flashbacks of him trapping Zoe's arm in the taxi door, watching her with the hidden webcamera and drugging her. He eventually lets Zoe go, only to attempt jumping off himself, only to be saved by a screaming Zoe & Zak.

The police grab him and lead him into a police car. Will got interviewed by a psychiatrist to explain his behaviour. He told her that Zoe made his life hell, and that Zoe asked him to film her, saying she enjoyed it, and they would watch the videos over together. He goes on to say that he didn't drag Zoe up on the rooftop, he followed her. He printed Zoe out to be a manipulative cheating self-obsessed liar. He said she slept with other men and told him his life wasn't worth living. It appeared at one point that the psychiatrist was due to believe his every word, which had many viewers on the edge of their seats; but Will got referred to a Mental Health Unit. He was to be taken by ambulance and was then sectioned under the Mental Health Act 1983.

== Reception ==
A Daily Post reporter stated, "We all want to see psycho Will get his comeuppance after tampering with Kris' HIV test results and watching Zoe from a secret camera."
