= India Longford =

UK soap opera character, created 2009

- Hollyoaks character
- Portrayed by: Beth Kingston
- Duration: 2009–2012
- First appearance: 21 September 2009
- Last appearance: 10 July 2012
- Introduced by: Lucy Allan (2009); Gareth Philips (2011); Emma Smithwick (2012)
- Spin-off appearances: Hollyoaks: Freshers (2010)
In-universe information
- Occupation: Student (2009–2010); Shop assistant (2010); Barmaid (2010)
- Father: Teddy Longford
- Mother: Melody Longford
- Sisters: Texas Longford
- Grandfathers: Alistair Longford
- Grandmothers: Pamela Longford
- Other relatives: Blanche Longford

India Longford is a fictional character from the British Channel 4 soap opera Hollyoaks, played by Beth Kingston. She made her first on-screen appearance on 21 September 2009 and was introduced by series producer Lucy Allan as a new student at Hollyoaks Community College. Kingston was given the role after she entered and won an online competition run by Hollyoaks Desperately Seeking. In November 2010, it was announced that India would be murdered. India was murdered by Silas Blissett on 23 December 2010. India returned briefly in 2011 and 2012. Kingston has stated that she was happy to leave the show before being typecast in the role. India has been portrayed as a "posh bird" and is narrow-minded, having a tendency to "rub people up the wrong way". She is also described as sensible and "strait-laced".

Many of India's early storylines revolved around her wanting to "fit in" among her fellow students, sleeping with Archie Carpenter (Stephen Beard), feuding with Hayley Ramsey (Kelly-Marie Stewart) and a "will-they-won't-they" relationship with Josh Ashworth (Sonny Flood). The relationship led to jealousy between Josh and his brother Rhys (Andrew Moss) resulting in India fighting for her life after a car crash caused by Josh. India's later storylines involved the arrival of her sister Texas (Bianca Hendrickse-Spendlove), sleeping with Jamil Fadel (Sikander Malik) and a brief relationship with homosexual Brendan Brady (Emmett J. Scanlan) who used her to hide his sexuality. Her most prominent and final storyline saw her online dating and despite being vigilant to begin with, agreeing to meet with a man named Cameron, which led to her being murdered by Silas Blissett (Jeff Rawle), who had been posing as him. India appeared as a vision on 10 August 2011 when Silas saw Texas as India. On 5 and 10 July 2012, India appeared in her sister's nightmares.

== Character creation and casting ==
In June 2009, it was announced that the Hollyoaks producers were looking for an actress to play the role of India Longford. The search was organised by Hollyoaks production house Lime Pictures through Hollyoaks Desperately Seeking, in the hope of discovering the show's "next Roxanne McKee" who successfully gained the role of Louise Summers after winning competition Hollyoaks: On The Pull in 2004. Women aged between 18 and 30 were invited to download an audition script and upload a video of themselves performing the script to the official Hollyoaks Desperately Seeking website. Speaking of the project, Hollyoaks series producer Lucy Allan said: "We are very excited about opening the audition process to a wider audience and hope to find that special raw talent that we found in Roxanne and Marcus [Patric] (who portrayed Ben Davies) in the ‘On The Pull’ series." In June 2009, the competition closed and Desperately Seeking announced that they had received 1679 votes. Three finalists were picked; Sophie Louise Craig, Brooke India Burfitt-Dons and Beth Kingston. On 4 July 2009, Sonny Flood (who portrayed Josh Ashworth) appeared on T4 live to announce that Kingston had been cast in the role of India. She began filming her scenes on 10 July. Kingston said "I was really excited and elated to get down to the last 25, never mind the last six, then three then go on to win. I've been bonding with the girls all week coordinating what we were going to wear on T4! I wasn't nervous up until the point we walked into the T4 studio and when they shouted my name out, I couldn't believe it. I was in pure shock. I can't wait to tell my family. When I was told that I was starting filming with Hollyoaks on Monday, I realised how quick a turnaround it is working on a soap! I'm just elated."

== Character development ==
Unlike her fellow students, India appeared to have a dislike for partying, drinking alcohol and eating junk food. Due to her being from an upper-class family, this made it hard for India to settle in, especially with Hayley Ramsey.

Hollyoaks producer Henry Swindell spoke to Digital Spy about the character's personality: "India's well-to-do, a little naive and in a world that she's not used to. But more than that, she's quite good at saying the wrong thing, rubbing people up the wrong way without realising it. A key part with the role of India is that she's got to fit in well with the rest of the student group."

During December 2010, Hollyoaks producers announced a murder plot involving India. In the plot, India would begin online dating and be murdered by Silas Blissett (Jeff Rawle) after agreeing to meet a man named Cameron. The Hollyoaks team worked closely with the University of Central Lancashire's Cyberspace Research Unit to raise awareness of internet safety. Dr Jo Bryce of the university spoke of India's murder, saying, "If the storyline can remind one young person to protect themselves when engaging in online activity, then that can only be a positive thing. Too many youngsters think they are immune to online risks and this storyline is a reminder that you don't always know who you're talking to online."

Series producer Paul Marquess also commented on the plot: "This is a terrifying murder that highlights the dangers of meeting strangers online". The storyline, which launches at Christmas, will take us right through 2011 and audiences will be gripped to find out if the dangerous killer will strike again." Discussing her exit, Kingston said, "It's going to be very upsetting because it comes as such a shock in the episode. She is in such a happy mood, she thinks she's found the one and she's talking about the future and is really hopeful about everything. And it's such a horrible thing that happens."

== Storylines ==
India first appears as a new student in Hollyoaks College, where she moves into the Halls with Josh Ashworth, Dave Colburn, Charlotte Lau and Hayley Ramsey. She makes a bad first-impression on Charlotte and Hayley, who feel India is stuck up. India makes inappropriate comments about Charlotte's sexuality and is also accused by Hayley of stealing her food. Despite India protesting her innocence, Hayley places laxatives in her pizza. India and Dave decide to get revenge on Hayley by eating her food. India eats the pizza and subsequently the laxatives. In a competition held by Neville Ashworth to win a car, India, Josh, Dave, Charlotte and Hayley are all inside trying to win it, when India begins to suffer as a result of Hayley's trick. She wins the car, despite her embarrassment, for being the last person left touching it. She later makes up with Hayley but leaves the college.

India returns a few weeks later at Halloween, where she begins playing practical jokes on the students. Once she reveals herself, she explains that her parents told her she should return to college and face her bullies. India and Dave then befriend mentally disabled Spencer Gray, who quickly develops a crush on her. India grows close to Josh. However, both are using one another to make Calvin Valentine and Hayley jealous. India kisses Calvin, who is hesitant due to his feelings for Mercedes Fisher. During a Christmas party, India kisses Josh.

During a night out at the loft Josh and India kiss again they both then decide to go on to another party along with Dave and Sasha Valentine Josh drives them all unaware his brother Rhys Ashworth had been spiking his orange juice with vodka due to this Josh crashes the car India is the only one left unconscious by the crash and is rushed to hospital fighting for her life while Josh is arrested.

India recovered soon after, and along with Rhys' help, made a full recovery and they soon developed feelings for each other. India admitted her feelings to Rhys and they began going out as they both feel special with one another, little did India know that Rhys was the one that actually spiked Josh's drink, nearly killing her in the process. India and Rhys begin a short relationship which ends when Rhys realises his brother needs him.

In May, India, and the rest of the students visit a mansion which hosts a murder mystery game to celebrate India's 20th birthday, where the students dress up as stereotypical American horror film characters; India plays a cheerleader. However, the game is never completed as Charlotte, who is meant to play the murderer, runs away with Molly, the game host, and the pair sleep together. India's sister, Texas Longford, turns up and they both end up leaving the mansion with Dave in a car which India thinks they stole, leaving Charlotte and the other students behind. India is relieved to discover the car actually belongs to Texas.

Upon leaving the mansion, India, Texas and Dave arrive back in Hollyoaks to witness the fatal shooting of Calvin Valentine on his wedding day. In the aftermath of the shooting, India is left in shock, having seen someone die right in front of her. India currently works at Cindy Hutchinson's boutique shop. Texas returns to Hollyoaks, and India and Texas' grandfather, Alistair Longford also arrives. Cindy Hutchinson saves Alistair from choking, and he proposes to her. Alistair has stopped providing money for India and Texas, the latter of whom is skint. After her grandfather and Cindy get married and move off, India has new bosses in Heidi Costello and Gabby Sharpe. As both of her bosses have different styles, India finds it difficult to please both and usually ends up pleasing none.

Brendan Brady (Emmett J. Scanlan) begins flirting with India in order to hide his homosexuality. However, he ends up mocking her. India gets even more fed up when her friends begin online dating and encourages them to be safe by writing down some tips and advice and places it on the fridge. But out of curiosity, she tries online dating herself and starts talking to a good looking man who claims to be called Cameron through the internet. She is on her way to meet him when she spots a middle aged man (Silas Blissett) whose car has broken down. Shortly after she lends him her phone to call for breakdown assistance, she soon realises he is Cameron, when he says her name. A struggle then ensues when she tries to fend him off attempting to escape from him, but he murders her. He then wraps her body in an old carpet, drives into a nearby woods and dumps her body into a pit. To cover up his tracks, he steals her ring and then texts Nancy who sends a text to India's phone asking if she was fine, making it clear that she is not. At the end of the episode the camera pans to the fridge, showing India's online safety advice, noting to viewers that India has completely ignored her own advice that has cost her life. Her body is then found the next day on Christmas Eve by Jack Osborne and Duncan Button. Texas films a reconstruction of India's murder Silas sees Texas as India. When Lynsey Nolan (Karen Hassan) is murdered, Texas has dreams and visions about India.

== Reception ==
Holy Soap describe India as a "posh bird who has a habit of putting her well-heeled foot in it." and describe her most memorable moment as "having an "accident" in a car after unwittingly eating a load of laxatives." Daniel Kilkelly of media reporting website Digital Spy branded India a "strait-laced character".
