= Josh Ashworth =

Fictional character from Hollyoaks

- Hollyoaks character
- Portrayed by: Sonny Flood
- Duration: 2005–2010, 2012
- First appearance: 28 September 2005
- Last appearance: 31 August 2012
- Introduced by: David Hanson (2005); Emma Smithwick (2012)
In-universe information
- Occupation: Student
- Father: Neville Ashworth
- Mother: Suzanne Ashworth
- Sisters: Hannah Ashworth
- Half-brothers: Rhys Ashworth; Jack Osborne
- Half-sisters: Francine Osborne
- Grandfathers: Bill Ashworth
- Grandmothers: Rose Dick
- Uncles: Noel Ashworth
- Aunts: Nikki Fletcher
- First cousins: Jamie Fletcher; Beth Clement

Josh Ashworth, played by Sonny Flood, is a fictional character from the British Channel 4 soap opera, Hollyoaks. His first appearance was on 3 October 2005. Josh's storylines have included attempted murder, underage sex, drugs, drinking and joyriding. Flood returned to filming as Josh for three episodes airing in May and August 2012 after a two-year break.

== Casting ==
The character was created in 2005 by David Hanson, with Sonny Flood cast in the role. In early 2010, it was announced that Hollyoaks executive producer, Lucy Allan, had stepped down from the role and that Paul Marquess had taken over. It was soon revealed that Marquess planned to give Hollyoaks a “shake up” by changing the production team and beginning a cast cull by axing the entire remaining Ashworth family apart from Rhys Ashworth (Andrew Moss). The move was part of his reinvention of the serial and clearing out the “deadwood”. Marquess later revealed he axed the Ashworths because he believed The Dog should have a lively family at the heart of it, and that the Ashworths had become grim because of their hard-hitting storylines.

In May 2012, it was announced that Flood would return to filming for two episodes. Josh was involving in a storyline alongside the characters of Michaela McQueen (Hollie-Jay Bowes) and Amy Barnes (Ashley Slanina-Davies).

== Storylines ==
=== 2005–2008 ===
After arriving in the village, Josh and his cousin Fletch begin a tour in the woods to see the "Hollyoaks Beast". When his sister, Hannah (Emma Rigby), discovers what they are doing, she and her two best friend, Sarah Barnes (Loui Batley) and Nancy Hayton (Jessica Fox), play a trick on Josh and Fletch by pretending to be the "real" beast.

Josh and Fletch try to get on the Year 12 "Fit List". However, Josh is tricked by Sarah, her sister Amy Barnes (Ashley Slanina-Davies) and Michaela McQueen (Hollie-Jay Bowes) into stripping in front of a class full of students. Josh and Fletch get their revenge on Hannah, Sarah and Nancy by doing an interview with the girls and editing the material to make their answers seem embarrassing. Josh and Fletch make the interview available for the whole school to hear. The three girls get their revenge by stealing Josh's childhood toys and putting them on display. Josh decides to end the war and he and Hannah form a truce.

Around Christmas 2005, Bill Ashworth (John Jardine) comes to temporarily stay with the family. Josh persuades his parents to let Fletch spend Christmas with them. The two friends do not get on well with Bill, although Bill adores Hannah. The pair learn that Bill has won some money from horse racing. Josh tells Fletch that Bill shouldn't spend his money, as he wouldn't be alive to enjoy it. Upon hearing this, Bill makes a bet with his two grandchildren regarding what day they think he will die. Rhys and Gilly also make a bet, and Bill says he will die on Christmas Day.

A few days before Christmas, Bill finds his war medals missing and blames Gilly. Eventually, he finds out that Josh and Fletch have taken them to frame them as a Christmas present. Bill apologises to Gilly and the whole family eat their Christmas lunch together. After lunch, the family notice Bill not breathing and Josh, Fletch, Hannah, Rhys, Gilly, Suzanne and Neville panic. Bill "awakens" and asks Josh, Fletch, Rhys and Gilly for the money he has just won for the bet they had made.

Months pass and Neville forces a reluctant Josh and Fletch to visit Bill in his rest home. Josh and Fletch see how sad and lonely Bill was in his rest home, Josh tries to tell his parents about Bill, but they are too busy to pay attention. Josh and Fletch persuade Bill to leave his home and the pair sneak him into the Ashworth house. A few days pass and eventually Bill is found by Suzanne, who calls a family meeting with the rest of the family. They vote as to whether Bill can stay in the house. Suzanne is out voted, as Bill had bribed his grandchildren to vote for him.

At school Josh and Fletch are confronted by Ste Hay (Kieron Richardson) and Wayne Tunnicliffe (Joe Marsden), who tells Josh that they fancy Hannah. They ask Josh and Fletch to hang out with them after school and be in their gang. They encourage the two cousins to smash up cars before Ste asks Josh if he and Wayne could come by his house to meet Hannah.When they arrive Wayne recognises Neville from working at Price Slice with Hannah and Neville shows the two boys how he manages the supermarket.

Neville is later fired from Price Slice after refusing to fire a long-term employee in order to save the shareholders of Price Slice's money. As a result, Suzanne takes extra shifts for her job as a nurse at the local hospital. Neville wants to buy the local shop, Drive 'N' Buy, after it is put up for sale by the owner Max Cunningham (Matt Littler), but the family can't afford the shop. Bill decides to give his son, daughter-in-law and grandchildren their inheritance as he wants to be around to see them enjoy it. Hannah and Rhys plan to spend their share on a holiday while Josh wants to buy a new mountain bike, but Neville realises that his share alone would not be able to buy Drive 'N' Buy. He asks the family to put all their shares together, but they refuse. Bill, with help from Fletch, persuades Hannah and Rhys to do the right thing (using emotional blackmail). Fletch tells Josh if he does not do the right thing then Neville will have to get a 9 to 5 job and Suzanne will continue taking extra shifts and Josh will never see them, just like Fletch's own parents. This, along with a little nudge from Hannah and Bill, persuades Josh to give up his share.

Josh tries again to be cool with Ste, so he copies an adult video for Ste, who has just got back with Amy. Ste, Amy, Josh and Fletch went to the Ashworths' house to get it, where Ste notices Neville has left his car keys on show. Ste takes the boys and Amy for a joyride in Neville's car before bringing it back again. He, Fletch, Michaela and Amy are walking home from school when Ste pulls up in a stolen BMW. Ste tells them all to get in the car and he drives the car across town. The police start chasing them, but Ste loses them and ditches the car. In school he and Fletch overhear Amy, Michaela and Ste planning to skip school and go joyriding again. Amy wants to stir a situation between Ste and the two cousins by telling Ste that Josh and Fletch criticised his driving. Ste tells the two that they should come with them so he can prove how great a driver he is, but Fletch refuses and Josh hesitates. Ste and the girls go and leave them behind.

While walking home from school that day they find Ste and the two girls waiting for them. Ste threatens them with a beating if they don't get in the car. Josh and Fletch agree. Josh wants Ste to think he is cool, and buys him and the others some beer. Ste's plan is to prove to the two cousins that he is an experienced driver by speeding and swerving on the road and trying to frighten them before leaving them stranded in the countryside. Ste ends up crashing the car and runs off after leaving Josh, Fletch and Michaela with an injured Amy, who had not been wearing a seatbelt. Ste tells the others he'll kill them if they don't keep quiet about him. Josh and Fletch are arrested at the scene and spend the night in a police cell, while Michaela goes to the hospital with Amy. Josh, Fletch, Amy and Michaela are convicted for joyriding and sentenced to community service. A few days later Josh and Fletch run into Ste, who is hiding in the village. Josh and Fletch, with Michaela's brother John Paul McQueen (James Sutton), manage to hand Ste over to PC Calvin Valentine. A few months later Josh is partnered, for a school assignment, with Amy. The two get on well together during the assignment and Josh asks Amy out; she says yes. Josh does not know that Amy is seven months pregnant, though neither Josh nor Ste is the father, or that Amy is only dating Josh as a distraction from her current problem, which is also the reason she went joyriding with Ste and Michaela.

Suzanne, who is a nurse at the hospital and is attending to Amy, knows of her pregnancy, and tells Amy to stay away from her son. Amy breaks up with Josh and he mopes around the house until Rhys and Gilly suggest he write down his heartbreak into a song. Josh writes Amy a song called "I'm in Love". He persuades Fletch to record the music and they sing the song together at Hannah's 18th birthday party. Amy is embarrassed because she did not want the school to know she was dating Josh, but she does admit to Josh that she thought it was a sweet gesture and the two get back together. After getting back with Amy, Josh invites her to his house. Rhys gives Josh a condom and tells him that girls like a man who is experienced and in control. When Amy comes over the two start kissing and Josh tries to take things further, but Amy becomes cross. Josh realises he has done the wrong thing and apologises.

The next day Josh finds a necklace on the ground and gives it to Amy as a present and asks her out on a date, which she accepts. Later, Rhys tells Josh he needs to look after the shop because his band has a gig. Josh closes the shop and sets up a picnic as a surprise for Amy. During the date, Frankie Osborne (Helen Pearson) comes into the shop to buy supplies for baby Charlie. A few weeks later Josh notices Amy having stomach problems at school, but she blames it on PMS. He invites to his house to use Suzanne's therapeutic pillow. He goes to get some music for Amy but when he comes back into the room, he notices Amy had left and there was a wet patch on his bed. Josh assumes she had wet herself because she hadn't been feeling well, but actually her waters had broken. Josh phones Amy on her mobile and leaves a message to tell her not to worry about the bed.

The following week Amy misses school and has her baby, who she names Leah, while Josh is sick with the flu. When he recovers, he and Fletch plan a party. Josh wants to invite Amy, but cannot find her. He does invite Amy's best friend, Michaela. Amy tries texting Josh, but he doesn't receive any of her messages. Amy arrives with Michaela and starts drinking heavily because of her problems with Leah. Josh talks to her and Amy asks him why he didn't answer her texts. She asks him to go upstairs with her to his room and forces herself on him, but Josh does not want to take advantage of her while she is drunk. Michaela bursts into his room and assumes Josh is trying to have sex with Amy while she is drunk. She takes Amy home, leaving a confused Josh behind. Amy and Josh later make up with each other.

After reading Amy's diary her father Mike Barnes (Tony Hirst) mistakenly believes that Josh was the father of baby Leah. He forces Amy to get birth control pills, despite Amy's protests that she and Josh hadn't slept together, and he bans them from seeing each other. The two do not listen and go to a party at Il Gnosh, where Mike confronts Amy in front of everyone and drags her home. The next day Josh goes to the Barnes' house, where the pair find and steal some of Mike's home brew, getting drunk as it is much stronger than they had believed it to be.Mike bursts in on them after they had been dancing and fallen on the bed. He tries to kick Josh out the house and bans him from seeing Amy, but when he implies that Amy is a prostitute Josh stands up to him and Mike punches him in the face. Josh tries to hide his black eye from Suzanne, but is unsuccessful. After letting slip it was Mr Barnes, his Mum storms down to see him, and Josh follows her, trying to stop her. After a confrontation at Drive'N'Buy, Suzanne warns Amy to stay away from her son, and Mike drags Amy away.

They continue to meet in Amy's room, with Josh climbing through the window. Josh brings up the topic of Amy's new baby "sister" and that he doesn't think the baby is Kathy's. When Amy asks him who he thinks Leah belonged to, he suggests Sarah and lets slip that he thinks only stupid people get pregnant as a teenager. Amy retaliates, but before anything can happen, Mike comes in the room, and Josh hides in the cupboard, where he hears Mike dropping hints about Amy being Leah's mother. However, he does not realize the truth.

The next day they meet at the Ashworth's house, where Rhys and Gilly catch them. After bargaining with Rhys, he allows the two to go upstairs, as long as they don't get caught. Josh had recently hit Amy's dad with a brick while defending himself. No one except Gilly, Rhys, Mike and Josh knows of this. Mike gives Josh a choice: split up with Amy or he will report him for assault. Josh and Amy run away together, but they call Amy's sister Sarah for help after they are robbed. When she arrives, she brings the police with her, and Josh is arrested for the attack on Mike. He is released on bail, after lying about his whereabouts. Mike later drops the charges after an agreement with Suzanne that she would not tell anyone about Amy being Leah's mother. At Amy's 16th birthday party, she reveals that Leah was not her sister, but her daughter. Josh is annoyed and upset that Amy had not told him this. He later finds out that Suzanne knew, as she had been Amy's nurse after the joyriding incident. He is annoyed about this, although he later appears to have forgiven her for not telling him about it, due to patient confidentiality. He breaks up with Amy as he feels he can't trust her anymore.

Josh is deeply worried about Hannah after the truth of her bulimia is revealed. Josh thinks he might be to blame, since he often bothered her over her weight. When Hannah and Melissa try to run away, Josh finds them and, out of concern for Hannah, calls out for Suzanne. He tries to get Hannah to tell their parents what had been going on, but they are interrupted by Melissa's heart attack. As Hannah's condition continues to worsen, Josh becomes increasingly frustrated because he feels no one is dealing with the situation. Josh, in tears, is spotted by Amy in the park. At first, she warns him not to speak to her, but she soon realises he is upset and consoles him. He confides in her about his problems and they nearly kiss, but are interrupted by the arrival of Amy's sister Sarah. After Hannah is sent to hospital, Amy bumps into Josh again where he confides Hannah's situation to her and the two agree to meet up later the next day. However, while Amy is waiting for Josh, he is comforting his mum over Hannah.

After Amy waits a while and phones Josh's mobile with no answer, she crashes into Ste. She goes with Ste to his squat, so by the time Josh arrives at Amy's house, she is gone. Amy begins a relationship with Ste, which ends after he begins to abuse her. Josh enters the reformed Baby Diegos (minus Amy) in the battle of the bands, but disaster strikes when Fletch turns up stoned and plays Amy Josh Forever, much to their embarrassment. He claims to be drunk, but Michaela finds heroin in his bag and confronts him with it. However, this backfires, with everyone thinking the drugs are hers. Josh later talks to Fletch, telling him he will help if Fletch admits to taking the heroin. Fletch refuses and Josh walks away from him. He tries to continue the band with just him and Michaela. While practicing at his house, she spots Rhys and Beth kissing. She spends the next day desperately trying to avoid him, but when he confronts her, she admits all to him. Josh confronts Rhys and Beth with the rumours, and despite their suspicious behaviour he believes their denial and sends Michaela packing. He is now friendless. Michaela and Josh later reignite their friendship after finding out that Beth and Rhys were lying about not being together. On 2 April Michaela receives a letter informing her of her HIV test, but she is worried and does not want to go. After a small confrontation with Josh, he goes to the appointment with her, where she tests negative.

After Amy breaks up with Ste, she and Josh once again become close. Amy asks Josh to take her to an abortion clinic, which he agrees to do. Amy then reveals that Ste was not the father of Leah and that she wants to get back together with Josh. The two reignite their relationship. After Ste taunts Josh, Josh reveals that Amy asked him to go to the abortion clinic with her. Ste tries to convince Amy not to have the abortion, and she admits that she does not want to go through with the abortion anyway. Ste tries to win her back, but she tells him to stay away from her and her baby, and that she is now with Josh. Although angry with Josh for revealing her secret about the abortion, they get back together while a gutted Ste demolishes his flat.

During Hollyoaks Later, Josh, along with Amy, Sasha and Micheala, perform in Liverpool, where they meet the Saturdays. Josh offends Sasha calling her a "druggie" and makes Amy play drums to hide the fact that she is pregnant. He is offered a record label, but because they will only sign him, he turns it down in order to stay with Amy and become her birth partner.

=== 2009–2012 ===
In early 2009, Rhys becomes annoyed with Josh for never spending time with him and constantly being with Amy. He occasionally stays over with her. However, Josh and Amy's relationship is also suffering because he is focusing intensely on the band and is starting to neglect her. Ste sees this as an opportunity to get back with Amy. Josh then meets a lesbian named Lydia who Amy doesn't like, prompting them to have an argument. After Amy gives birth, she runs away and tells Josh their relationship is over.

In April 2009 Rhys tries to cheer Josh up by proposing to make a new band, The Somethings, for them to play in. They try to get a demo CD on the student radio station, but Kris Fisher asks them if they can play live instead. Kris becomes the band's agent. They put on a competition called Voice Idol on the student radio Kris runs in order to find a female lead singer, with Hayley Ramsey winning.

Hayley becomes their lead singer after Rhys makes a fuss and tries to put up Lydia as the lead singer, although she is not a good singer. After a lot of complaints and comments about Hayley being in a wheelchair, Hayley gives Josh an ultimatum: he kicks Rhys out or she leaves. Though Josh feels guilty about it, he kicks Rhys out, remarking that they can replace a drummer much more easily than they can replace a singer like Hayley. Lydia becomes the drummer, but things do not work out because Lydia has other commitments. Josh reappoints Rhys as the drummer, much to Hayley's dismay. Hayley and Rhys spend most of their time arguing until they are left alone during one rehearsal and end up kissing. They become a couple. The band later collapses after Josh fires Hayley because she can't dance due to her being in a wheelchair, and Micheala becomes the new lead singer. No one signs them because of Josh's bigotry.

In Hollyoaks: The Morning After The Night Before, which follows Josh going to Manchester with Dave Colburn, Josh is introduced to Dave's friends Gabby and Pippa and falls for guitar-playing Ruby. However, he ends up sleeping with Gabby and later discovers Gabby has given him pubic lice. Gilly and Sasha Valentine also turn up to party in Manchester. Eventually, Josh and Gilly get into a fight which leads to Gilly falling downstairs and losing his teeth. Josh drunkenly sleeps with Sasha after she has a fight with Gabby. The next day Sasha refuses to talk to him and Rhys comes to take Josh home. Once back in Hollyoaks, Sasha and Josh make up before she goes to visit her brother Sonny. Josh and Rhys's girlfriend, Hayley, spend the day together devising pub quiz questions, and, after drinking some wine, they share a brief kiss before Josh pulls away quickly, asking "What are we doing?". Hayley is prepared to dump Rhys for Josh, but Josh feels guilty. Hayley does dump Rhys and is jealous when Josh flirts with new student India Longford.

Rhys and Hayley rekindle shortly and when Josh appears to be jealous, Hayley dumps Rhys for a second time. Josh begins to develop feelings for India and, after sharing a kiss at the students' Christmas party, they start going out. During a night out at the loft, Rhys spikes Josh's orange juice with vodka. Josh and India decide to move on to another party along with Dave and Sasha, but Josh badly crashes the car due to his unintentional alcohol consumption. India is left unconscious by the crash and is rushed to hospital fighting for her life as Josh is arrested by the police for driving under the influence. Josh gets a suspended sentence, his license is revoked, and for 6 months he is instructed to go to AA meetings. Josh is forced to live with Ste and Amy while everyone turns their backs on him. Suzanne later insists he moves back home, which causes arguments with Neville, who has disowned him. During Suzanne's birthday dinner, Josh refuses to do as Neville tells him, leading Josh to punch him. Neville decides to report him to the police, much to everyone's disbelief. Josh crashes another car whilst drunk, and Neville refuses to visit him in hospital. He eventually changes his mind has a heart to heart with Josh. India, Dave and Charlotte also forgive him when they find out he is in hospital. Josh is sentenced to prison for his second DUI offence.

When Josh is released from prison, he is shocked to find his family living apart due to his mother Suzanne's affair with Darren Osborne, which Neville blames Josh for. Suzanne eventually gets Neville to forgive her on the condition they emigrate to Spain. Neville also reveals that Josh is not invited to come. Rhys eventually confesses to spiking Josh's drink. After some initial anger Josh decides to forgive Rhys as he'll always have to live with the guilt. Neville and Suzanne agree to take Josh with them to Spain. Two years later Josh goes for a drink with Amy, Michaela and Leanne Holiday (Jessica Forrest). He reveals that he is engaged to someone, has a new flat, and is studying a new university course. Josh returned on 31 August 2012 for the departure of Michaela and left with her to go touring. It is revealed in December that Josh is unable to return for his brother Rhys' funeral as he is in Thailand with Michaela and cannot get a flight back.
