= Hollyoaks: The Morning After the Night Before =

- Genre: Serial drama
- Created by: Home Office
- Starring: Sonny Flood; Nathalie Emmanuel; Anthony Quinlan
- Country of origin: United Kingdom
- Original language: English
- No. of series: 1
- No. of episodes: 12

Production
- Executive producer: Lucy Allan
- Producer: Christopher Wood
- Running time: 3–4 minutes (per episode)

Original release
- Network: E4 (online)
- Release: 6 July – 31 July 2009

Related
- Hollyoaks

Hollyoaks: The Morning After the Night Before is a British Internet serial drama, which began airing on 6 July 2009. A spin-off from the established Channel 4 soap Hollyoaks, it was set in the city of Manchester a metropolitan borough of Greater Manchester. The series follows three established Hollyoaks characters: Josh Ashworth (Sonny Flood), Sasha Valentine (Nathalie Emmanuel) and Gilly Roach (Anthony Quinlan) as well as new characters: Dave Colburn (Elliot James Langridge), Ruby (Danika McGuigan), Gabby (Charlotte Harwood) and Pippa (Chloe Crampton). One of the new characters Dave was also introduced to Hollyoaks main show.

Hollyoaks: The Morning After the Night Before originally aired as part of a government scheme. It was devised in a bid to tackle the problem of binge drinking with young people. The series was the idea of the Home Office and produced by series producer of Hollyoaks Lucy Allan, in order to tell the important message of binge drinking and the dangers of it. All episodes of the show are available for free on the UK iTunes Store.

== Development ==
The series sees Hollyoaks characters, Josh Ashworth (Sonny Flood) and Sasha Valentine (Nathalie Emmanuel), taking a month's break after their exams. Josh befriends a boy named Dave Colburn (Elliot James Langridge), who convinces Sasha to come with them to Manchester.

Producer, Lucy Allan said, "It was an interesting project and a really challenging idea for us to take part in. It's telling an important message with regards to binge drinking, yet doing it in a compelling way so that the viewers are drawn along with the story rather than just the message."

== Plot ==
Josh arrives in Manchester ready to party. He meets Dave. Josh is introduced to Dave's friends, highly unstable Gabby and then to the seemingly sweet, yet drunk "daddy's girl" Pippa. Gradually getting more and more drunk, Josh starts talking to guitar-playing bar candy Ruby. The pair get on so well that Josh manages to bag himself a date. Waking up with hangovers, Josh and Dave get straight back on the booze. Suddenly realising he has got a date, Josh meets Ruby; the pair share a kiss. Ruining the moment completely, Josh leaves Ruby to go clubbing with Dave. He also leaves her to pay the bar tab. When Gilly arrives, Ruby takes a shine to him, much to the annoyance of a jealous Josh who proceeds to invade the stage and cause a full on riot. Physically and mentally bruised, Josh meets the grief-stricken Sasha. Reluctant to join in with the groups boozing activity, Sasha is dragged along to a bar only to be left alone by Josh and co, feeling self-conscious and intimidated by the rowdy lads around her. Thinking enough is enough, Sasha leaves the bar, but is followed by a shady character. Josh arrives on the scene just in time to scare the man away from Sasha. Two days later, Sasha is still upset with the crew for abandoning her, so, to make up for this, they plan a "quiet night in". The gang's idea of this is in fact drinking games. Dave and Sasha flirt and kiss due to "spin the bottle". Josh's one night stand with Gabby comes back to haunt him when he discovers he has got crabs. Gilly and Ruby become even closer. Josh and Gilly fight, which ends up with Gilly losing his front teeth. Gilly heads back to Hollyoaks village, meanwhile Josh continues his wild antics by winding up the local bouncer and accusing Gabby of giving him an STI. Banned from the local clubs, the group find a small bar, in which, a karaoke is on the go. Gabby and Sasha end up fighting over whose turn it is to impersonate Amy Winehouse. Dejected and drunk, Sasha and Josh return to Dave's flat and end up sleeping together. The next day, Sasha immediately regrets sleeping with Josh, so she keeps her distance. Rhys pays his brother an unexpected visit. Ruby blames Josh for Gilly's accident, which leads to his decision to head home to Hollyoaks village. Sasha goes on a night out with Dave. Pippa's plans to split up Dave and Sasha on the dance floor are thwarted, but her next conniving plot works when Sasha ends up getting arrested. Sasha wakes up in a police cell. At a house party, Pippa confronts Sasha, who then forces Dave to choose between her and Pippa. Sasha is feeling a bit rough and Pippa is hanging around. Pippa lets slip that Dave told her Sasha was a heroin addict, which does not particularly sit well with Sasha. Sasha gets her revenge on Dave, before following in the footsteps of Gilly and Josh back to Hollyoaks where Sasha and Josh meet at The Dog, discussing the events that took place in Manchester.

=== Characters ===
With the characters of Josh, Rhys, Gilly and Sasha already having been in Hollyoaks, Lucy Allan added new character Dave the week before the broadcast of the first episode. His original name was Dave McCready, however this was changed to Colburn. After the series finished, Dave returned to Hollyoaks as a student at Hollyoaks Community College. The series also introduced three new female characters, Pippa, Gabby and Ruby, presently, there are no plans for the three characters to appear in Hollyoaks.

Character	Actor
Josh Ashworth	Sonny Flood
Sasha Valentine	Nathalie Emmanuel
Rhys Ashworth	Andrew Moss
Gilly Roach	Anthony Quinlan
Dave Colburn	Elliot James Langridge
Ruby	Danika McGuigan
Gabby	Charlotte Harwood
Pippa	Chloe Crampton

== References in Hollyoaks ==
During the series' broadcast, several references were made on the main Hollyoaks show towards the events of the series. The Ashworth family most notably mentioned Josh's trip to Manchester. Gilly, after having his teeth knocked out, appeared in the village minus his teeth, which he later got fixed. Josh also let slip to Michaela McQueen about his sexual relations with Sasha.
