= Zak Ramsey =

UK soap opera character, created 2004

- Hollyoaks character
- Portrayed by: Kent Riley
- Duration: 2004–2010
- First appearance: 6 September 2004
- Last appearance: 6 August 2010
- Introduced by: Jo Hallows (2004); Bryan Kirkwood (2006)
In-universe information
- Other names: Zak Barnes
- Occupation: Student
- Brothers: Caleb Ramsey
- Sisters: Hayley Ramsey
- Nephews: Caleb Ramsey

Zak Ramsey (also Barnes) is a fictional character from the British soap opera Hollyoaks, played by Kent Riley. The character debuted on-screen during the episode broadcast on 6 September 2004. The character was originally credited as "Zak Barnes". After only four months, Riley was written out of the show. Producer Bryan Kirkwood reintroduced him in 2006 and was then credited with the surname Ramsey. Zak was introduced into the series as one of three new student characters, who arrive to study at the Hollyoaks Community College. Joining Zak were Bella Manning (Kim Bourelle) and Stuart Harding (Dan Cryer). When the character was reintroduced, a new set of students were created for Zak to share stories with. Zak is portrayed as a Scouser / Liverpudlian character, with a "fun-loving" persona and enjoys partying rather than concentrating on his studies.

In 2008, producers invested more in the character and created Zak's most prominent relationship storyline. Paired with Michaela McQueen (Hollie-Jay Bowes), Riley believed that the two characters were embarrassed about their unlikely relationship but later fell in love. Producers also introduced Zak's sister, Hayley Ramsey (Kelly-Marie Stewart), a disabled character who has the illness, Guillain–Barré syndrome. The topical story allowed writers to explore the impact that new disabilities have on family members. Riley explained that Zak and Hayley shared a close relationship until she became reliant on her wheelchair because of her disability. Other notable stories include the exploration of national discrimination when Archie Carpenter (Stephen Beard) accuses Zak of theft because of his Scouser heritage. Beard confirmed that his character was not politically correct in his accusations of Zak, just because he is from Liverpool.

Following the arrival of producer Paul Marquess in January 2010, the series underwent a rejuvenation. As part of cast changes, it was announced that Riley had been axed from the series for a second time. Marquess claimed that he removed Zak and fellow characters from the show because writers had run out of storylines for them. Zak's final stories focused on his break-up with Michaela and his involvement in a racism storyline in which his friend, Des Townsend (Kris Deedigan) convinces Zak to help him target ethnic minorities. Zak was grieving the death of his brother during the story and turns to alcoholism. Zak exposes Des' crimes when he realises the extent of his hate campaign. Zak made his final appearance during the episode broadcast on 6 August 2010.

== Casting ==
Auditions were already underway for the part of Zak when actor Kent Riley received a call from his agent and he auditioned for the role, later going on to be cast as Zak. After his initial departure, Riley was asked by producers to return to the role.

== Development ==
=== Characterisation and introduction ===
The character of Zak was created as one of three new characters written into the series. These consisted of Zak, Stuart Harding (Dan Cryer) and Bella Manning (Kim Bourelle) and are new students who move in to the halls of residence at the Hollyoaks Community College. He was originally described by Hollyoaks' publicity team as "footie-mad" and "a Scouser with attitude and more than an eye for the ladies!" After the character's initial stint, he was brought back into the series. During the character's first stint he was credited as Zak Barnes. When he was reintroduced into the series in 2006, his surname had been changed to Ramsey. A separate family with the surname Barnes was introduced during the intervening period of Zak's on-screen absence.

An excerpt from the official Hollyoaks website detailed how Zak was not interested in studying during his first year at college. The writer added "Zak's determined to spend as much time polishing his student credentials and as little honing his academic skills as he can." Channel 4 publicity described him as a "fun-loving" man who likes 'a good knees-up' with his friends. They also detailed how he looks after his sister, Hayley Ramsey's (Kelly-Marie Stewart) love life, alluding to Zak being protective of his sister. Zak has always been unlucky in his love life, even though he Riley described him as "has his eye on most of the ladies" featured in the show.

When Zak was reintroduced, writers featured him in the student group consisting of Jessica Harris (Jennifer Biddall), Will Hackett (Oliver Farnworth), Zoë Carpenter (Zoe Lister) and Kris Fisher (Gerard McCarthy).

=== Character expansion ===
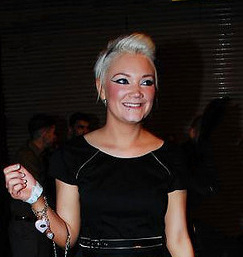
Hollie-Jay Bowes plays Zak's main love interest, Michaela McQueen

In late 2008, writers invested more in the character romantic and family stories to play out during the following year. They created Zak's relationship with Michaela McQueen (Hollie-Jay Bowes) and introduced his sister, Hayley. Her arrival created added drama in his stories with Michaela. Both Zak and Michaela are portrayed as embarrassed about their relationship. Riley told an Inside Soap reporter that they "really like each other" but "I don't think either of them knows why!" Riley believed that Zak was more embarrassed than Michaela which is why he hides their relationship from friends. He added that an argument between the two results in them declaring their love for each other. This worried Riley, who was unsure that Zak could truly commit to Michaela. He added knew "I'm not sure he knows the meaning of the word love."

When Hayley arrives, Michaela presumes that she is a new love rival and this begins their relationship woes. Hayley, is a disabled character who has Guillain-Barré Syndrome, which Stewart who plays her also diagnosed with. The story explored Zak and Hayley's backstory and how Zak struggles to cope with her illness. Stewart told Tina Miles from Liverpool Echo that "before Hayley's illness, she had a great relationship with her brother Zak, but now he finds it difficult to relate to her and cannot see past her disability." They story explores the issues of a family member being unable to accept their relative's new disability. Riley added that Zak and Hayley used to have a close relationship. This confuses his friends because Zak never mentioned Hayley. Riley explained that "Hayley's arrival has a huge impact on Zak, because he's forced to explain why he's never mentioned having a sister." Riley concluded that Zak never came to terms with Hayley's disability. Riley revealed that the story also placed his character between two feisty females as Michaela and Hayley struggle to get along. He added that they "don't get along from the moment they meet, they've certainly got feisty outlooks on life!"

In March 2009, Riley revealed that he was contracted to Hollyoaks until December that year. He announced that writers were planning a "really strong storyline" for his character. The story begins when Zak and his friends Kris, Elliot Bevan (Garnon Davies) and Archie Carpenter (Stephen Beard) find £100,000 in cash and decide to keep it for themselves. The story allowed for a topical aspect involving localised discrimination. Zak is portrayed as a Scouser / Liverpudlian and when money goes missing, Archie automatically presumes Zak must have stolen it due to his Scouse identity. Beard told an Inside Soap reporter that Archie is "quite un-PC in his thinking, because Zak's a Scouser, there's no doubt in Archie's mind that he took the cash." Beard added that Archie's accusations causes a fight between the friends as Zak is forced to defend his background. Elliot later admits he took the money to help his girlfriend Leila Roy (Lena Kaur).

=== Departure and racism story ===
In January 2010, Lucy Allan left the position of executive producer, with Paul Marquess taking over the role. Marquess planned to revamp Hollyoaks, changing the show's production team and implemented cast changes, immediately writing out three established characters. By the following month, Marquess had decided to remove a further eleven characters from the series, including Zak who would leave at the end of Riley's contract. Marquess told Liverpool Echo's Miles that his decision to write the characters out was because they had run out of stories for them. He noted that Zak "had been a student for a long time." The previous year, Riley expressed his interest in Zak being killed off, if he was to leave the show. Despite this, Marquess chose an insignificant exit as it was stated that the character would simply move on to pastures new at the end of his storyline-arc.

Of his departure, Riley told Kris Green from Digital Spy that he was "a little bit sad" to be leaving. He explained that "in terms of the character, it's sad because he's much-loved but personally, it's a good time for me to move on to... different things... There are a few auditions coming up, so we'll just have to wait and see." Bowes who plays Zak's love-interest Michaela was unhappy with the final stories planned for the couple. She questioned Marquess' plans during a meeting and was dropped from the third series of Hollyoaks Later as punishment. The incident enraged Bowes who quit the show over the incident.

Zak's final stories in his latter months included his involvement in a racism story and his break-up with Michaela. Writers introduced infidelity for Zak as he sleeps with Laura (Laura Ainsworth). The plot coincided with Zak's alcoholism story arch in the aftermath of Caleb's death. Charlotte Lau (Amy Yamazaki) shocks Zak by revealing she knows about their affair and could tell Michaela. Zak's friend Des Townsend (Kris Deedigan) convinces Zak to be honest with Michaela but she discovers his infidelity prior and break-up with him.

Writers introduced Zak into a racism story which involved his affiliation with Des. The latter decides to target ethnic minorities living in the village because of their background and race. With Michaela's help, Zak decides to expose Des' racist attacks. He begins by ensuring Des' girlfriend Jacqui McQueen (Claire Cooper) knows first. Cooper told an Inside Soap that Zak and Michaela obtain a video detailing all of Des' crimes. Zak reveals details of Des' plan to target Jacqui's sister Carmel McQueen (Gemma Merna) for marrying Calvin Valentine (Ricky Whittle), who is black. Jacqui responds by publicly humiliating Des and hitting him.

== Storylines ==
Zak first shares a student flat with Zara Morgan (Kelly Greenwood), Lisa Hunter (Gemma Atkinson), Steph Dean (Carley Stenson), Cameron Clark (Ben Gerrard) and Bella. Zak leaves college after one year and returns the following year. Zak moves back into the student halls with Jessica, Kris, Zoë, Will, Joe Spencer (Matt Milburn) and Olivia Johnson (Rochelle Gadd). Zak drinks too much vodka at the Loft and becomes sick. Kris, Zoë, Joe, and Olivia all go to the Dog in the Pond a few days later and are caught up in an explosion. Joe and Olivia are killed, and Zak moved into Olivia's room.

Zak has one-night stands with both Zoë and Jess. After realising his feelings for Zoë, Zak tries his best to make things up to her, but this is soon ruined by Will who wants Zoë to himself, and so sets Zak up to look as though he has stolen from her. Zak soon begins to distrust Will, Zak and Zoë realise the extent of Will's mental health issues. Zak rescues Zoë when Will takes her hostage on the roof of the college. This results in Will being sectioned under the Mental Health Act. Zak then tries to kiss Zoë, but she reacts badly because of Will and goes home. When Zoë returns, Zak continues to pine for her, but soon realises she is falling for Darren Osborne (Ashley Taylor Dawson). Zak saves Darren from muggers and a guilt-ridden Darren initially stays away from Zoë, but Zak pushes them together.

Zak develops romantic feelings for Katy Fox (Hannah Tointon), despite her relationship with Zak's friend Justin Burton (Chris Fountain). Zak and Katy kiss while enjoying an afternoon together. Katy admits she was just upset and jealous that Justin was giving all his attention to his son Charlie Dean (Joshua McConville). Zak and Katy share another kiss and begin an affair. Katy continues to seek emotional support from Zak. Justin witness Zak and Katy kissing, which results in her leaving the village. Zak fails his degree in Sports Science and remains at HCC for another year to finish the course.

Zak drunkenly has sex with Michaela but they immediately regret it. Months later on New Year's Eve 2008, they sleep together again. Calvin then arrests Zak and Ash Roy (Junade Khan), for assaulting Gaz Bennett (Joel Goonan), despite them not being responsible. Michaela protests for Zak's release and they begin a relationship once Zak is released without charge. Michaela and Zak have an argument which results in them declaring their love for each other. Zak's sister Hayley Ramsey (Kelly-Marie Stewart), who uses a wheelchair due to Guillain–Barré syndrome, arrives to stay in Hollyoaks. Hayley was in hospital for four months and Zak never went to see her. Zak explains that he was ill equipped to deal with her illness emotionally and thought it was easier to avoid her. Hayley forgives Zak and they rebuild their relationship.

Michaela tries to enrol Zak in the Army. Zak and Hayley's brother Caleb arrives. Zak then pretends to be attending training, later revealing he lied. Zak graduates university and decides to take a master's degree. Caleb is sent to fight in Afghanistan but is later killed. Zak becomes engaged to Michaela to cope with his grief. Zak has a one-night stand that splits up him and Michaela. He then finds out Caleb died because his friend Tariq Mistry was saving an Afghan boy. Zak beats up Tariq and gets back with Michaela. Racist Des uses Zak's grief to brainwash him against Calvin. Zak realizes that Des is a racist and tries to stop him from planning to attack Ravi Roy (Stephen Uppal). Zak saves Ravi after Des plants a smoke bomb in Ravi's burger bar, Relish. He makes an anonymous phone call to the police to inform them that Ravi's sister Anita Roy (Saira Choudhry) when he realizes that Des is planning to attack her, Des enlists Gaz to carry out the attack, which results in Gaz's arrest. Michaela end her relationship with Zak for his role in the racist attacks. Tariq confronts Zak about the attacks but decides not to report him to the police because he is grieving his brother's death. Zak leaves to live in London with Kris and Michaela joins them weeks later. When Michaela returns in 2011, she reveals that she and Zak broke up once again.

== Reception ==
Katie Fitzpatrick from Manchester Evening News described Zak as a "laddish sports science student". A Western Mail writer bemoaned the "Scouse post-graduate" Zak's intelligence. They quipped he "is not the sharpest knife in the kitchen drawer, so it was only a matter of time before he did something stupid to jeopardise his relationship with Michaela." A Soaplife writer also profiled their relationship. They assessed that Zak and Michaela have sex because they both think they ste unable to find alternative partners. The writer added that "sex-and-socks loser or bunny-boiler... we're not sure which of them had the luckiest escape. Or just maybe they're actually made for each other."
