= Michaela McQueen =

Fictional character from Hollyoaks

- Hollyoaks character
- Portrayed by: Hollie-Jay Bowes
- Duration: 2006–2012, 2026
- First appearance: 11 January 2006
- Last appearance: 18 February 2026
- Introduced by: David Hanson (2006); Gareth Philips (2011); Hannah Cheers (2026)
- Spin-off appearances: Hollyoaks Later (2008–2009, 2011)
In-universe information
- Other names: Michaela Jones
- Occupation: Journalist (2008–2010)
- Family: McQueen
- Father: Ricky Bowen
- Mother: Myra McQueen
- Sisters: Carmel McQueen
- Half-brothers: Niall Rafferty; John Paul McQueen; Richard Bowen
- Half-sisters: Jacqui McQueen; Mercedes McQueen; Tina Reilly; Carmina McQueen
- Grandmothers: Marlena McQueen
- Aunts: Kathleen McQueen
- Nephews: Max McQueen; Bobby Costello; Matthew McQueen
- Nieces: Kathleen-Angel McQueen; Phoebe McQueen (adoptive)
- First cousins: Theresa McQueen; Jennifique McQueen
- Other relatives: Bart McQueen; Kathleen-Angel McQueen

Michaela McQueen (also Jones) is a fictional character from the British Channel 4 soap opera Hollyoaks, played by Hollie-Jay Bowes. Michaela was the first of the McQueen family to be seen on-screen in 2006, when she was credited as Michaela Jones. On 8 June 2010, Bowes announced that she had quit the show and would leave in six months. However, it was announced on 24 June 2010 that show bosses had axed Bowes and speedily wrote Michaela out after she spoke about upcoming storylines and her exit on social networking website Twitter. Bowes reprised her role as Michaela in 2011, initially appearing in the fourth series of Hollyoaks Later, before reappearing in the main series. In July 2012, Bowes confirmed she would be leaving Hollyoaks, and her final scenes would air on 31 August 2012. On 21 January 2026 It was confirmed it was announced that Bowes had reprised her role as Michaela as part of a "what if?" episode.

== Development ==
=== Characterisation and introduction ===
Michaela's early appearance in which Bowes was required to wear a wig.

A writer from the serial's official website described Michaela as always ready "for a bit of McQueen scheming" and said she has always had to fight to gain attention for herself. Hollyoaks international broadcaster, BBC America, described Michaela as "a magnet for trouble" because she has a penchant for thieving. Her "favourite pastime" of shoplifting has contributed to Michaela landing herself in trouble with the law. Most often her mother, Myra McQueen (Nicole Barber-Lane) is the only one "who can put Michaela in her place". They added that when Michaela is with her best friend and "partner in-crime", Amy Barnes (Ashley Slanina-Davies) - "you'd better believe she's up to no good."

Bowes was initially required to wear a wig for the role which the company's hair and makeup department applied each morning. Bowes later ran an online contest were fans were asked to name her wig, the winner of the competition was the name "wigglamina".

Michaela was originally introduced as Amy's best friend and was credited as Michaela Jones. Her initial storylines explored her troubled friendship with Amy. Michaela becomes annoyed with Amy when she decides lose her virginity in the back of a car. Michaela ends their friendship and begins spreading rumours about Amy and Ste Hay (Kieron Richardson). Michaela later humiliates Amy at school which results in a physical fight between them.

=== Departures and return ===
In June 2010, Bowes attended a meeting with producer Paul Marquess in which she complained about storylines involving her character and on-screen boyfriend Zak Ramsey (Kent Riley). Marquess then decided to drop Bowes from the third series of Hollyoaks Later. Bowes then announced via Twitter that she was leaving the serial in the following six months. She also revealed details about a storyline involving character Kevin Smith (Cameron Crighton). Marquess was not made aware of Bowes' decision to leave and the storyliners were angry with her for revealing plot details. The programme's production were so "enraged" with Bowes' behaviour that they quickly wrote Michaela out of the show. Michaela's departure aired in August 2010, when she is sacked from her job as a journalist. She then decides to move to London straightaway to be with Zak.

In June 2011, it was announced that Michaela would be returning to feature in the fourth series of Hollyoaks Later. Producers had attempted to keep her return a secret, but were forced to go public when paparazzi photographed Bowes filming. Entertainment website Digital Spy later revealed that Michaela would also rejoin the main programme. During episodes of Hollyoaks Later Michaela announces that she is going to return home. Michaela will make her full-time return in October 2011. Bowes told Inside Soap that Michaela arrives back in the village feeling "very sure of herself" and takes an "instant dislike" to Lee Hunter (Alex Carter). Michaela and Amy strike up their duo once more, however Michaela is annoyed to learn Amy is in a relationship with Lee. While her family make it clear to her that "nobody's going to put on a special party now she is home". Bowes said that Michaela has not changed because "she's always going to get up to mischief". Michaela also uses every opportunity she gets to make an "idiot out of herself". Bowes stated that she would continue to request that the programme's writers create more "trouble" for Michaela.

At the July 2012 Inside Soap Awards launch party, Bowes confirmed that she would be leaving Hollyoaks once again. She explained "I love Michaela and she's absolutely my baby. But I'm 23 years old now, and it's time to explore other things."

== Storylines ==
Michaela first appears as a friend of Amy. She pressures Amy into having sex with boyfriend Ste, so that Michaela's boyfriend Wayne Tunnicliffe (Joe Marsden) wouldn't dump her. When Ste dumps Amy, Michaela's nasty streak becomes apparent when she begins teasing her, before going off with Wayne and Ste, leaving Amy upset and alone. When Amy stands up to Michaela, they fight in the playground at school. The next day, Michaela is dumped by Wayne, so she reconciles with Amy. Amy and Ste get back together and he takes her, Michaela, Josh Ashworth (Sonny Flood) and Jamie "Fletch" Fletcher (Sam Darbyshire) joyriding, which leads to a car crash. Ste flees the scene. However, Amy is badly injured and taken to hospital. After spending the night in a police cell, Michaela visits Amy in hospital and nearly tells the Barnes family about Amy's pregnancy.

Michaela decides to track down her father, Ricky Bowen (Simon Cassidy). When they meet, Ricky apologises to Michaela for not trying harder to be involved in her life, claiming Michaela's mother Myra stopped him from seeing Michaela and her siblings John Paul (James Sutton) and Carmel (Gemma Merna). Michaela takes Ricky back to the McQueens' home, where her family do not trust him. During Christmas, Ricky steals the family's presents and leaves, leaving Michaela heartbroken. After this, Michaela begins dating her friend Sasha Valentine's (Nathalie Emmanuel) brother, Sonny (Devon Anderson). Michaela and Sonny plan to sleep together, but are interrupted by Sonny's older brother, Calvin Valentine (Ricky Whittle). The relationship ends when Michaela discovers Sonny had told people he had been sleeping with Michaela's older sister Mercedes McQueen (Jennifer Metcalfe). However, they later get back together, and are arrested for shoplifting on Michaela's sixteenth birthday. Michaela is cautioned by Calvin. Sonny and Michaela eventually sleep together, but he soon moves away from Hollyoaks, which left her devastated, but more bad news for her, as she discover that her older brother John-Paul was gay, and didn't accepted him first, but later she did.

Michaela sells the story of Amy's pregnancy to a local newspaper, much to the chagrin of the Barnes family. This causes Amy's mother Kathy Barnes (Sarah Jane Buckley) to take her obsession with Amy's daughter Leah to the point where she kidnaps her. Amy is furious with Michaela and ends their friendship. With Sasha's interference, Michaela and Amy eventually make up. Michaela sleeps with Ste's friend Nige and begins smoking cannabis. As Michaela's behaviour grows out of control, Myra ends up slapping her, and she moved in with Amy and Ste. However, Amy throws her out when Ste frames her for stealing money. Myra's secret son Niall Rafferty (Barry Sloane) begins taking revenge on his family. Firstly by injecting Michaela with heroin. Michaela overdoses and her family begin to believe she is a drug addict. After returning home, Michaela moves in with Niall, unaware he injected her. Niall and Jacqui McQueen (Claire Cooper) both express concern that Michaela may have HIV, so make her take a test. However, Michaela is told she does not have HIV. Michaela begins to strain due to nobody trusting her. After finding heroin in Fletch's bag, Leo Valentine (Brian Bovell) catches Michaela and assumes she is still using. Despite her innocence, people still refuse to believe that Michaela is not a drug addict. Michaela catches Rhys Ashworth (Andrew Moss) kissing his half-sister Beth Clement (Sinéad Moynihan), so alerts Josh and Mercedes, who Rhys is going out with. However, Rhys and Beth make people believe Michaela is lying, due to her apparent drug abuse. Michaela eventually tells Beth's fiancé Gilly Roach (Anthony Quinlan), who catches Rhys and Beth in bed together. Josh apologises to Michaela for not believing her.

Michaela begins a friendship with Amy's father, Mike Barnes (Tony Hirst). Michaela eventually develops a crush on him, and is jealous when he begins a relationship with Zoe Carpenter (Zoë Lister). Michaela throws herself at Mike, and is turned down. That night, Myra finds a note supposedly from Michaela saying she is going to London on a journalism course, unaware she has actually been kidnapped by Niall. Myra soon discovers notes from all her children, and finds them tied up by Niall in a church. Niall makes Myra choose two children to live, and tells her he will kill the rest. Myra chooses Michaela and Tina Reilly (Leah Hackett). However, Niall detonates explosives and Tina is eventually killed.

Michaela drunkenly sleeps with Zak Ramsey (Kent Riley), but the next day both regret it. On New Year's Eve 2008, Michaela and Zak sleep together again and they later begin a relationship. Michaela clashes with Zak's sister Hayley Ramsey (Kelly-Marie Stewart), but they later become friends. When Zak's brother Caleb (Michael Ryan) is killed in Afghanistan, Zak proposes to Michaela due to his grief. Zak goes out binge drinking and sleeps with a stranger. When Michaela finds out, she ends their relationship. However, they get back together when he admits his love for her. After Michaela discovers that Zak has been involved in secret racist attacks with Jacqui's boyfriend Des Townsend (Kris Deedigan), she calls off their engagement once again, which leads to Zak leaving the village. Michaela is sacked from her job as a journalist, so decides to move to London to be with Zak. Michaela leaves in November 2010.

In Hollyoaks Later Michaela returns when Myra and Mercedes go on a hen night in Ibiza, where Michaela is now living. She reveals she has split from Zak and is now dating a man called Michael who she is living with. She is stranded on a desert island where she reveals her relationship is false and decides to go back to Chester. She arrives back in Chester in October 2011 and takes an immediate disliking to Amy's fiancé, Lee. After Lee leaves for New York, she helps Amy get over her grief. Amy leaves in August 2012 and soon after, Josh returns with a job offer for Michaela to tour with a band. She agrees and leaves the village.

== Reception ==
Bowes was nominated in the category of "Funniest Performance" at the 2009 Inside Soap Awards and the following year The McQueen's won the "Best Family" award. At the 2009 British Soap Awards she was nominated for Best Comedy Performance. Virgin Media said Michaela had a "lifestyle worthy of headlines" and said viewers could not forget the time she was kidnapped by Niall. They opined that while Michaela was off-screen, she was most likely involved in "yet more scrapes". Holy Soap described her best moment as "Fighting to clear her name after Niall planted heroin in her bedroom." Liverpool Echo praised her for having "come out with some cracking lines". In a Sunday Mail column, she was described as being "about as reserved as Vicky Pollard high on sugar." A reporter for the Western Mail said that the "loud-mouthed sixth-former" and boyfriend Zak "both eat, sleep and breathe for the opposite sex" and quipped "it's a wonder that Zak and Michaela haven't hooked up before." The Western Mail's writer said "her ears prick up at the slightest hint of a juicy scoop." A Soaplife writer also profiled their relationship. They assessed that the duo copulated because they both believed they were unable to find partners. They added "sex-and-socks loser or bunny-boiler... we're not sure which of them had the luckiest escape. Or just maybe they're actually made for each other."

A reporter from Holy Soap opined that Michaela is one of the funniest characters in Hollyoaks, as she does not "hold back with her opinions". While a What's on TV columnist observed her as being "just as much of a tearaway as her big sisters" with "a real gift of the gab." Michaela has been described as "mischievous", "malicious" and a "motormouth" by writers from the Daily Record, the Liverpool Daily Post and the Sunday Mail respectively.
