= Dave Colburn =

- Hollyoaks character
- Portrayed by: Elliot James Langridge
- Duration: 2009–2010
- First appearance: 30 June 2009
- Last appearance: 27 August 2010
- Introduced by: Lucy Allan
- Spin-off appearances: Hollyoaks: The Morning After the Night Before (2009); Hollyoaks: Freshers (2010)
In-universe information
- Occupation: Student (until 2010)

David Colburn is a fictional character from the British Channel 4 soap opera, Hollyoaks, played by Elliot James Langridge. He first appeared in Hollyoaks online spin-off Hollyoaks: The Morning After the Night Before, which explored the dangers of binge drinking. After this, Dave made a regular appearance in Hollyoaks as a new student at Hollyoaks Community College. Dave left the teen soap in August 2010 after the character was axed earlier that year.

== Creation and casting ==
Elliot James Langridge was cast as Dave after being turned down for a minor role on Hollyoaks. Langridge stated: "I [originally] auditioned for a very small part and I didn't get it. Then I got a call back to say that they wanted me to play this other lead role and so I didn't even have to audition [again]. I was very lucky."

Dave first appeared in one episode of Hollyoaks before appearing in web-based spin-off Hollyoaks: The Morning After the Night Before. Due to the launch of the series, three social networking website groups were created on Bebo for Dave, Josh Ashworth and Sasha Valentine. These Bebo pages were regularly updated during the broadcast of The Morning After the Night Before. After his initial appearance, it was announced Dave would return to the main Hollyoaks show.

In early 2010, it was announced that Allan had stepped down from the position of executive producer and that Paul Marquess had taken over the role. It was soon revealed that Marquess planned to give Hollyoaks a "shake up", changing the productions team and beginning a cast cull by axing three established characters. Stephanie Waring (who plays Cindy Hutchinson) then revealed that all remaining cast members feared their character would be axed. One month later, Marquess announced his plans to axe a further 11 characters, including Dave at the end of Langridge's contract.

Dave departed the main Hollyoaks series on 27 August, but continued to appear on the online spin-off Hollyoaks: Freshers in an exit that was described on the serial's official website as paying homage to his debut in which he first appeared in an on-line spin off of Hollyoaks.

== Characterisation ==
Speaking of the character at the Inside Soap Awards, Langridge stated: "He's a ladies' man... and he's a bit of a mess but everyone loves him. He's this charismatic party animal... He's one those characters that you kind of get the feeling he's got too much good luck. Some day down the road, he's going to get kicked in the arse for something. But you never really know... he's unpredictable. He's got a lot of things he needs to do, so hopefully there's going to be a lot of fun with this guy...." He has also been nicknamed "Dave 'the rave' Colburn" on the official website for the serial and of his time on the show they stated: "Dave's wild lifestyle went on to wreak havoc in the village. He was involved in many student hi-jinx, as well as getting accused of date raping Anita Roy and having a key role in the aftermath of Josh's crash."

== Storylines ==
Dave is a friend of Charlotte Lau who arrives on 20 June 2009 in the SU Bar. At first meeting, Josh Ashworth does not like him as he taunts his friend Lydia Hart. However the pair later start to get on and Dave asks Josh if he wants to come with him for a week away in Manchester, which takes them into the events of Hollyoaks: The Morning After the Night Before.

In September 2009, Dave begins at Hollyoaks Community College to study History of Art and moves into the halls of residence, alongside Hayley Ramsey, Charlotte Lau, India Longford and Josh. Dave befriends India when she is targeted by Hayley, and convinces her to take revenge on Hayley by eating her food, which Hayley had laced with laxatives. During a competition held by Neville Ashworth to win a car, Dave, India, Josh, Hayley and Charlotte are in the car when India has an accident as a result of Hayley's trick. During the Freshers Ball, which Neville and Suzanne Ashworth agree to hold at The Dog in the Pond, Dave causes the bar to be wrecked when the students begin helping themselves to alcohol. After India leaves, Dave and Charlotte agree to let Archie Carpenter move in, who is homeless following an argument with friends. Dave befriends mentally disabled Spencer Gray, who allows all the students to have free alcohol in The Loft. Calvin Valentine, the manager, arrives and assumes Dave has taken advantage of Spencer. He ends up punching him. Dave immediately tries to avoid Spencer.

Dave attracts the attention of Anita Roy, who is adamant to lose her virginity to him. Anita and Theresa McQueen turn up at Dave's party. Dave is uninterested. However, when Dave finds MDMA, Anita takes it, eager to impress him, and she collapses. Afterwards, Anita's siblings Leila and Ravi accuse Dave of spiking Anita's drink. Anita later admits to taking the MDMA herself.

In February 2010 Dave is involved in a car crash with India, Josh and Sasha Valentine however he is left unharmed. Everyone blames Josh, unbeknown to them including Josh, his brother Rhys Ashworth had spiked his drink with vodka. However believing that Josh was still responsible, Dave, India and Charlotte Lau decided to kick him out of the flat, leaving him to live on the streets, as his parents had also told him that he is not welcome home. However they reconcile with Josh after he hospitalised when he yet crashed another car. Dave highly supported Josh throughout the second crash and along with Josh's family, he waved goodbye to Josh as he is escorted to court.

Dave, Charlotte and the new fresher students decide to go to festival. They arrive at the venue, only to discover that the tickets that Darren Osborne (Ashley Taylor Dawson) had sold them for a large sum of money, were in fact photocopies of a valid ticket. As a result, they instead go travelling in a camper van. They hit France and stop by in a farm to stay and earn some money in the process. As the trip comes to a conclusion, Dave decides to continue travelling and heads round the world. Weeks after his departure, Charlotte announces that Dave is currently in Mexico.
