= Dennis & Gnasher: Unleashed! =

2017 British animated comedy TV series

- Genre: Comedy
- Based on: Dennis the Menace from The Beano comics created by David Law
- Written by: Various
- Directed by: Boris Hiestand (Series 1); Kitty Taylor (Series 2)
- Voices of: Freddie Fox; Rasmus Hardiker; Ryan Sampson; Kathryn Drysdale; Kelly-Marie Stewart; Joanna Ruiz; Maya Sondhi
- Theme music composer: The Vaccines
- Composers: Rob Lord; Graham Kearns; Mr Miller and Mr Porter (Series 2)
- Country of origin: United Kingdom
- Original language: English
- No. of series: 2
- No. of episodes: 103

Production
- Executive producers: Michael Elson; Jo Allen; Tim Searle (Series 2)
- Producer: Karina Stanford-Smith
- Running time: 11 minutes
- Production company: Beano Studios; CBBC Production; Jellyfish Pictures

Original release
- Network: CBBC; Netflix
- Release: 6 November 2017 – 17 March 2021

Related
- Dennis and Gnasher (1996–98); Dennis the Menace and Gnasher (2009–13)

Dennis & Gnasher: Unleashed! is a British animated television series based on the Dennis the Menace strip from the British comic The Beano created by David Law. The strip first introduced in 1951. It started airing on CBBC on 6 November 2017 and is the third animated adaptation of the strip after Dennis and Gnasher and Dennis the Menace and Gnasher, as well as the fourth overall. The series stars Freddie Fox as Dennis. A second series began on 13 July 2020.

== Plot ==
The series follows 10-year-old Dennis the Menace and his dog Gnasher as he teams up with his friends Pieface, JJ and Rubi to cause havoc to Walter and Beanotown and Bash Street School, in a world full of action-packed adventure where rules just get in the way. It is a rural town.

Each episode also includes a short 2D section featuring Gnasher's fleas telling jokes.

== Cast ==
- Freddie Fox/Bryce Papenbrook (US dub) as Dennis, the title character and a master of trouble.
- Boris Hiestand as Gnasher, his pet dog, who serves as a sidekick.
- Rasmus Hardiker as Walter Brown, Dennis' stuck-up arch-enemy and Grizzly Griller, an explorer who is a Bear Grylls parody.
- Ryan Sampson/Kyle McCarley (US dub) as Peter "Pieface" Shepherd. One of Dennis' best friends and with a rather odd personality and has a pet potato, Paul.
- Kathryn Drysdale/Dorothy Fahn (US dub) as Jemima/Jennifer (US dub) "JJ" Jones. The most fearless girl of Dennis' friends who always tells Dennis stories that her big brothers have told her, even though they may not be true.
- Kelly-Marie Stewart/Cristina Vee (US dub) as Rubidium "Rubi" von Screwtop. The smartest of Dennis' friends and uses a wheelchair, as does her voice actress. She is very good at making plans. Her father is the scientist Professor von Screwtop, who first appeared in the Lord Snooty strip in the 1940s.
- Joanna Ruiz/Anne Yatco (US dub) as Mrs Creecher, Gran and Anne Finally – a journalist whose name is a play-on the words "And finally...".
- Maya Sondhi as Miss Mistry, who joined Bash Street School as a new teacher in Series 2.

== Production ==
The series was first announced on 8 June 2016, when The Beano announced they were setting up a business dedicated to media based on The Beano. Dennis & Gnasher: Unleashed! will be their first production. On 5 October 2016, it was officially announced that the series would air on CBBC in 2017 and the first-ever picture of Dennis in CGI was released. On 17 March 2017, Freddie Fox was announced to be voicing Dennis, a clip of the series was also released. On 3 July 2017, Rasmus Hardiker, Ryan Sampson, Kathryn Drysdale, Kelly-Marie Stewart and Joanna Ruiz were all added to the voice cast and another clip was released.

The series was announced for a second installment on 12 February 2019, after the success of the first. Dennis & Gnasher: Unleashed! season one received nominations at Kidscreen, the British Animation awards and was nominated for an International Emmy.

The music for the series was composed by Rob Lord and Graham Kearns and the theme tune was performed by The Vaccines.

== Episodes ==
Season	Episodes	Start Date	End Date
1	51	6 November 2017	18 December 2018
2	52	13 July 2020	17 March 2021

=== Series 1 (2017–18) ===
No. overall	No. in season	Title	Directed by	Written by	Original release date
1	1	"Edubot 4000"	Boris Hiestand	Jen Upton	6 November 2017
Walter is tired of Dennis pulling the wool over the eyes of their teacher Mrs Creecher, so he gets his father, owner of a major company and mayor of Beanotown, to construct a robot to replace Creecher named Edubot 4000. To Dennis's dismay, the robot stops all his pranks and even perfectly catches a pea from Dennis's incredibly accurate pea shooter. When Walter too is put in detention Dennis forces Walter to give them the files from his father's company for the Edubot. Back in the den, Rubi remarks that the robot is incredibly amazing and is ahead of its time while examining the blueprints and finds an access port where they could install a virus; the only problem being that it is where on a human the bottom would be positioned. Rubi creates a virus and they create a ruckus in the corridors back at the school where Dennis fires the USB stick into the port and the robot goes haywire before exploding. Triumphantly, they return the next day to find Creecher once again their teacher.
2	2	"Dare Dennis"	Boris Hiestand	Tony Cooke	7 November 2017
Anne Finally, Beanotown's news reporter is in Beanotown Park where she is talking about whether or not skateboarders on the walkways is dangerous, right before Dennis comes crashing through and is captured on camera doing an amazing accidental trick and lands in a bush. Dennis goes to the Den completely embarrassed and hoping that it was not shown on the news. To his dismay, they are watching the video on YouTube over and over before Paul's (Pieface's pet potato's) birthday. Realising that people love the trick, his fame goes to his head and neglects his friends as he continues to show off and forgets Paul's party. But, Walter uploads a video of his cat Clawdia playing the piano. Walter sells the rights to make a Clawdia musical and Dennis seeks to reclaim his fame. Dennis accidentally sends Gnasher caveering in a shopping trolley and ruins the poster for Clawdia the Musical. Dennis gives up fame and Gnasher becomes the star, and Dennis apologises to his friends.
3	3	"Dinmaker Diva"	Boris Hiestand	Denise Cassar	8 November 2017
Dennis and the gang are fed up with dinner lady Olive's completely inedible school dinners. In their mission to 'drop the slop', they discover a poster of her past career as a singer. The gang ask her to join The Dinmakers – hoping she'll swap a life in the kitchen for fame. However, after unleashing Olive's inner diva, their new mission is how to get Olive back into the kitchen!
4	4	"Raiders of the Lost Sweetie"	Boris Hiestand	Jen Upton	9 November 2017
Mrs Creecher confiscates Dennis' rare sour sweetie – The Tongue Destroyer. Dennis is desperate to get the sweet back and takes his friends on an adventure to the school's 'Confiscatorium', a secret place where all confiscated goods are hidden in the depths of Bash Street School.
5	5	"Escape from Azkabash"	Boris Hiestand	Matt Baker	10 November 2017
Dennis must escape detention and Bash Street School to make the Beanotown Brawny Bean Race before Walter wins it. With the help of a note placed in his desk, he must sneak past Mrs Creecher and make a run for it – unless the mysterious note giver stops him first.
6	6	"Griller Thriller"	Boris Hiestand	Ciaran Murtagh & Andrew Jones	13 November 2017
Dennis' ultimate hero, Grizzly Griller, plans on trekking to the source of the River Beano, broadcasting the treacherous path on live TV. Dennis introduces him to his pet hamster, Galahad – only to discover they are his biggest fear! Grizzly is so afraid that Dennis must disguise himself as his hero and go in his place!
7	7	"Pie Spy"	Boris Hiestand	Matt Baker	14 November 2017
Pieface steals Professor Von Screwtop's Pastry-based Intelligent Espionage unit (PIE) after forming a strong bond with the pie-shaped robot. Pieface is dismayed when Walter steals it from him to protect his dad from the embarrassing footage the PIE's memory chip holds.
8	8	"Night of the Living Veg"	Boris Hiestand	Ciaran Murtagh & Andrew Jones	15 November 2017
Mrs Creecher uses the school's allotment to hold Class 3C's 'Biggest Veg' competition before the vegetables start to come alive.
9	9	"The Hamazing Hamsterman"	Boris Hiestand	Jen Upton	16 November 2017
Dennis gets into a fluffy mess when he runs into Professor Von Screwtop's hadron collider with the professor's pet hamster, Galahad. To stop Dennis from completely changing into a hamster, the gang must sneak him into Wilbur's lab to use his reverse hadron collider and change him back!
10	10	"Prank Wars"	Boris Hiestand	Tony Cooke	17 November 2017
Dennis discovers that Ralf the janitor is the legendary Prankmaster General and is told he could become his successor. Walter won't let this happen and challenges him to a prank battle to win Ralf's book of pranking – the infamous Prankypedia.
11	11	"Give Peas a Chance"	Boris Hiestand	Denise Cassar	20 November 2017
Mayor Wilbur passes a law to increase the healthy eating in Beanotown, replacing all foods with peas... of the mushy variety! The gang must avoid the people of Beanotown who are rapidly turning into Zompeas after eating the green mush. Dennis uses the only ordinary peas in town to sabotage Wilbur's mush making factory and save the day!
12	12	"The Fan"	Boris Hiestand	Matt Baker	21 November 2017
Walter attempts to ruin The Dinmakers' chance of reaching fame. He will stop at nothing – even wearing a frock, and pretending to be a fan called Wanda who loves Dennis in order to break up the band!
13	13	"Screwtop Spudswap"	Boris Hiestand	Chris Chantler & Howard Read	22 November 2017
Dennis is desperate to prevent Pieface from failing Mrs Creecher's maths test! He persuades the gang to use Professor Von Screwtop's mind-swapping device. But in a disastrous turn of events, Screwtop is on the loose with the brain of Paul the potato and Pieface is left with a potato with the brain of Screwtop to help get him through the test!
14	14	"Are We There Yeti"	Boris Hiestand	Jen Upton	23 November 2017
The gang go on an adventure in search of the Beanotown Yeti.
15	15	"Super Paul"	Boris Hiestand	Ciaran Murtagh & Andrew Jones	24 November 2017
Dennis persuades Pieface that Paul is an undercover superhero.
16	16	"Wonder Sausage"	Boris Hiestand	Matt Baker	5 February 2018
After discovering that the Wonder Sausage, the most amazing sausage in the world, has strange hypnotic effects on Gnasher, Walter uses it to turn Gnasher against Dennis and the gang.
17	17	"Jurassic Bark"	Boris Hiestand	Laura Beaumont & Paul Larson	6 February 2018
Gnasher digs up a Gnashersaurus Rex thighbone in the park.But when a scientist named Dr. Pfooflepfeffer reanimates it the gang must get it out of Beanotown as Walter chases after it to put on his dad's trophy case.
18	18	"Screwtop In Love"	Boris Hiestand	Andrew Emerson & Jen Upton	7 February 2018
The gang try to find Professor Screwtop a girlfriend.
19	19	"The Great Beanotown Bake-Off"	Boris Hiestand	Jen Upton	8 February 2018
Pieface wants to make the best pie ever to win the annual bake-off.
20	20	"Why So Clonely"	Boris Hiestand	Matt Baker	12 February 2018
Dennis accidentally clones himself and uses his new clone to do all his chores.But Walter has plans to use the cloning machine for his own plans.
21	21	"The Wrong Man-ace"	Boris Hiestand	Jen Upton	13 February 2018
Dennis is mistaken for a Beanotown baddie while in disguise to sneak into a 12A film.
22	22	"Red And Black To The Future"	Boris Hiestand	Howard Read	14 February 2018
When Dennis finds Professor Screwtop's time machine in the lab, he can't resist using it.
23	23	"Pig Trouble In Little Beanotown"	Boris Hiestand	Chris Chantler & Howard Read	16 February 2018
Dennis takes Rasher the pig to school disguised as an exchange student.
24	24	"I, Clawdia"	Boris Hiestand	Chris Chantler & Howard Read	19 February 2018
When the gang's sausages go missing, Gnasher realises he's being set up by Clawdia.
25	25	"Postcards From The Veg"	Boris Hiestand	Denise Cassar	20 February 2018
Pieface thinks Paul has gone on Holiday, or are the gang playing tricks?
26	26	"The Whole Tooth"	Boris Hiestand	James Walsh	21 February 2018
When Gnasher gnashes Walter's portrait, Walter takes revenge with a titanium sausage.
27	27	"Freewheelin'"	Boris Hiestand	Ciaran Murtagh & Andrew Jones	21 May 2018
It's the famous Beanotown Freewheeler Derby! During practice, the gang realize Walter's go-cart is especially speedy. Worried that Walter will beat his record, Dennis creates a lighter, faster cart but loses control and injures himself. It is up to Rubi's wheelchair know-how and Dennis' super-speedy carting skills to win the race
28	28	"Were-walter"	Boris Hiestand	Alex Collier	22 May 2018
There's a werewolf-type creature on the prowl and suspicion falls on Gnasher. Dennis has to prove his best pal's innocence as the full moon shines down on Beanotown...
29	29	"Dennis TV"	Boris Hiestand	Ciaran Murtagh & Andrew Jones	23 May 2018
Walter launches his own mega-dull, hypnotic TV channel with a signal booster that swamps all other channels! Rubi helps Dennis set up his own TV channel with a more powerful booster to free the residents of Beanotown from Walter's TV trance. Who will win the battle for ratings?
30	30	"The Dog Ate It Miss"	Boris Hiestand	Chris Chantler & Howard Read	24 May 2018
Gnasher accidentally gulps down Dennis' permission slip for the school trip! There's only one thing for it – they need Prof von Screwtop to use his shrink ray to shrink them down to bite-size humans so they can travel on a sausage into Gnasher's tummy and find the slip! Easy! Well, it would be if it wasn't for the tiny alien empress Miasma living in there.
31	31	"The Fangtom Menace"	Boris Hiestand	Alex Collier	25 May 2018
Pieface's first sleepover in the den is troubled by spooky tales of a frightening Fangtom and Walter turning up with a demolition gang determined to flatten the den!
32	32	"Gnashernal Treasure"	Boris Hiestand	Chris Chantler & Howard Read	28 May 2018
The class dig up a mysterious time capsule which sets them off on a race to find hidden treasure before Walter or a greed-crazed Paul the Potato can find it first.
33	33	"Ralf's Last Prank"	Boris Hiestand	Denise Cassar	29 May 2018
When Dennis and the gang think they have caused Ralf to lose his job, they're determined to make his last day at Bash Street School totally blam by setting up the greatest prank Ralf's ever known
34	34	"Extreme Sports Day"	Boris Hiestand	Matt Baker	30 May 2018
Dennis recruits Grizzly Griller to help make school sports day more extreme, but as he and JJ get competitive against each other, who is sabotaging both their chances of winning?
35	35	"Today The Dog, Tomorrow The World"	Boris Hiestand	Chris Chantler & Howard Read	31 May 2018
Power-hungry tiny alien Empress Miasma takes control of Gnasher from the inside and uses him in her attempts to take over planet Earth. But when Miasma breaks out of Gnasher into Beanotown for real and Walter helps her grow in size, mayhem really takes hold!
36	36	"School Of Croc"	Boris Hiestand	Andrew Emerson	1 June 2018
When Walter leaves his pampered pet croc, Crunchzilla, to fend for itself, Dennis and the gang help him to get in touch with its wild side. Walter does his best to prevent them, as he needs to keep the croc tame in the hope of getting back his father's limo keys, which Crunchzilla has accidentally swallowed.
37	37	"Grizzly's Great Outdoors"	Boris Hiestand	Alex Collier	4 June 2018
A snake bite causes Grizzly Griller to forget all his survival know-how, so it's down to his greatest fan Dennis to help him re-learn his survival skills and help them all make it safely back to Beanotown.
38	38	"Bertie's Backbone"	Boris Hiestand	Andrew Emerson	5 June 2018
Dennis and the gang train Bertie in the art of standing up to people so he can rebel against Walter's bossiness – but they train him too well and he becomes a dangerous rebel without a clue!
39	39	"Gnash Hit"	Boris Hiestand	Tim Bain	9 July 2018
Grizzly Griller finds his ultimate animal sidekick for an action-packed feature film – Gnasher!
40	40	"Heroes In A Halfpipe"	Boris Hiestand	Chris Chantler & Howard Read	10 July 2018
The residents of Beanotown get their skates on to stop Walter destroying the half-pipe! Can Dennis pull off the ultimate trick to save the skatepark?
41	41	"Gran Up"	Boris Hiestand	Tim Bain	11 July 2018
Dennis encounters the same OLD trouble with Walter – will Gran come to the rescue?
42	42	"Tech Specs"	Boris Hiestand	Alex Collier	12 July 2018
When Walter's gold goes missing, it's up to Mrs Creecher and Sergeant Slipper to solve the case!
43	43	"Goodbye Rubi Doomsday"	Boris Hiestand	Chris Chantler & Howard Read	13 July 2018
Rubi suspects her invitation to Science Genius Summer Camp isn't what it seems when she finds her inventions being used for evil...
44	44	"Pi In The Sky"	Boris Hiestand	Andrew Emerson	16 July 2018
Can Dennis and the gang help professor Screwtop to save Beanotown from its biggest threat – himself?!
45	45	"BMXcess"	Boris Hiestand	Ciaran Murtagh & Andrew Jones	17 July 2018
Professor Screwtop locks a secret gadget away in the lab – but when Walter tries to steal it, can the gang save the day?
46	46	"Pieface Day"	Boris Hiestand	Alex Collier	18 July 2018
The whole town celebrates Pieface when they think he heroically saves Walter! But only Walter knows the real story...
47	47	"Crouching Dennis, Hidden Yeti"	Boris Hiestand	Denise Cassar	19 July 2018
Dennis and the gang go on a quest to find the ultimate Beanotown Blam-jitsu master – the Beanotown yeti!
48	48	"Double Crust"	Boris Hiestand	Matt Baker	20 July 2018
Professor Screwtop is full of so many great ideas that it's a wonder no one else has thought of them before. Or have they?
49	49	"Get Lost"	Boris Hiestand	Chris Chantler & Howard Read	23 July 2018
The gang get lost in the woods and stumble into the Land of Lost Things, where Gnasher gets dognapped by a Gnashersaurus Rex which has lost its beloved egg. To save Gnasher they have to rely on Pieface logic to reunite the G-Rex with its egg before Walter makes a record-breaking giant omelette with it.
50	50	"Call Of The Wild"	Boris Hiestand	Tim Bain	24 July 2018
When Gnasher gets sent to dog obedience school for gnashing Mrs Creecher's saxophone, one of Professor Screwtop's inventions, the Chatterbox, allows Dennis to understand animal noises, so he can ask Gnasher why he did it – if only all the other animals in Beanotown would stop chatting to him for a minute!
51	51	"Dennis and the Beanostalk"	Boris Hiestand	Andrew Emerson	18 December 2018
A massive Beanostalk sprouts up in Beanotown, taking all the gang's Christmas stuff – and Gnasher – up beyond the clouds to a land of giants! Dennis and the Gang bravely climb up to Ginormotown, determined to find Gnasher and bring Christmas back home. On their journey they find themselves giving away all their Christmas goodies, showing the Ginormotowners – and themselves what the spirit of Christmas is really about!

=== Series 2 (2020–21) ===
No. overall	No. in season	Title	Directed by	Written by	Original release date
1	1	"Beat the Bus"	Kitty Taylor	Matt Baker	13 July 2020
New teacher Miss Mistry is taking Class 3C on an outing to the Flumes 'o' Doom water theme park, and if anyone is a micro-second late, the bus leaves without them. The next day, Dennis has been struggling with time-keeping, and Walter pulls out all the sneaky stops to make Dennis late for the bus.
2	2	"The P Factor"	Kitty Taylor	Alex Collier	14 July 2020
Pieface is secretly doing underpants-laundry chores for Walter, hoping to help Dennis save up some cash. He urges the gang to audition for a replacement Pieface to make up for his mysterious absence.
3	3	"Bathmageddon"	Kitty Taylor	Matt Baker	15 July 2020
Gnasher's annual bath can be put off no longer, but the stinky hound will do anything to avoid getting washed. Dennis and Gnasher go head-to-head in a round-the-town game of cat-and-mouse – or more accurately, tripe-hound-and-wheelie-bath-tub.
4	4	"Pranksy"	Kitty Taylor	Alex Collier	16 July 2020
The after-school art club which everyone apart from Dennis loves is under threat of imminent demolition. In trying to save the club, the gang end up on the trail of the mysterious undercover urban artist known only as "Pranksy".
5	5	"Blamjitsu Sensei"	Kitty Taylor	Isabel Fay	17 July 2020
JJ is convinced that Mrs Creecher is secretly a master of Blamjitsu. Not loving the idea of hanging around teachers at the weekend, the gang nevertheless try to help her trick Mrs Creecher into revealing her blam credentials.
6	6	"Molar Power"	Kitty Taylor	David Quantick	20 July 2020
Doctor Pfooflepfeffer covets the world-beating power of Gnasher's indestructible teeth. She'll stop at nothing to get her hands on one of those doggy-dental marvels.
7	7	"Sausage Lossage"	Kitty Taylor	Alex Collier	21 July 2020
Walter undercuts Butch Butcher by bringing out a range of nasty but addictive sausages, in an attempt to deprive Gnasher of the food that fuels his energetic gnashy ways. His typically irresponsible manufacturing methods create a monster fatberg which can only be shifted by the awesome power of town-wide toilet-flushing.
8	8	"Things Get Chilli"	Kitty Taylor	Matt Baker	22 July 2020
With Paul on vacation, Pieface falls under the influence of a fiery chilli pepper and unexpectedly turns bad-ass.
9	9	"Spud-U-Love"	Kitty Taylor	Isabel Fay	23 July 2020
Paul the Potato is love-struck by the poster-girl potato advertising WilburCorp's new line of super-posh chips. The gang stage a daring potato-rescue in the WilburCorp factory.
10	10	"Bertiesitting"	Kitty Taylor	Claire Wetton	24 July 2020
Gran is lumbered with babysitting Bertie, and she in turn lumbers Dennis and his mates to help her wrangle the reluctant baby-sitt-ee and prove her ability to get a babysitting permit.
11	11	"We Want to Break Free"	Kitty Taylor	Karen Reed	27 July 2020
With all his mates unfairly kept inside at lunchtime by a very cranky Mrs Creecher, Dennis is exasperated to find that he can't land himself in detention, no matter how much he misbehaves.
12	12	"The Abominable Showman"	Kitty Taylor	Lisa Akhurst	28 July 2020
Torn between practising Blamjitsu with the yeti, and helping the Dinmakers write a new school song, JJ tries to combine the two by bringing the yeti along to band practice disguised as a very hairy roadie.
13	13	"The Comedy Crown"	Kitty Taylor	Tim Bain	29 July 2020
Dennis and the gang enter Pieface into a Comedy Contest to boost his confidence and make him realise how brilliantly funny he is. Walter is determined to win the crown himself, so he uses an Emojiggler gadget on the unsuspecting audience, to make them react in the style of any random Emoji he chooses.
14	14	"Cat v Dog"	Kitty Taylor	Lisa Akhurst	9 November 2020
Walter's pampered cat Clawdia persuades her way into the gang, and only Gnasher can tell that she's got a hidden agenda to oust him from Dennis' life forever.
15	15	"Boarding Beano"	Kitty Taylor	Mark Huckerby & Nick Ostler	10 November 2020
Doctor Pfooflepfeffer's first reckless act as Head of Governors is to turn Bash Street School into a boarding school. The pupils only find out at the end of the school day when all the doors slam shut, trapping them inside and instigating a series of daring attempts to escape.
16	16	"Thumb Wars"	Kitty Taylor	Chris Corcoran	11 November 2020
Miss Mistry pits Dennis against Walter in a bout of thumb wrestling, misguidedly thinking it will resolve their spiralling competitiveness. When Walter unexpectedly thrashes Dennis, the gang are determined to work out how he's cheating and expose the fraud.
17	17	"President Dennis"	Kitty Taylor	Mark Huckerby & Nick Ostler	12 November 2020
Dennis accidentally gets elected Class President and can't wait to shake off the responsibility that comes with the title. But every daft school policy he announces, only makes him a more popular presidential choice than he was before.
18	18	"Inventor's Block"	Kitty Taylor	Karen Reed	13 November 2020
Dennis doesn't realise the pressure he's putting on Rubi to excel in the school science fair is giving her a severe case of Inventor's Block.
19	19	"Pranks For the Memories"	Kitty Taylor	Ben Ward	16 November 2020
Dennis is on his last warning – one more prank in school and he'll be sent to Grim Lane School. While he struggles to get through a prank-less day, Walter conspires to make Dennis fail and get thrown out of school.
20	20	"Grizzly Games"	Kitty Taylor	Claire Wetton	17 November 2020
Dennis and the gang can't wait for their all-day PE training day with Grizzly Griller, and are baffled when their idol makes them learn a range of naff boring non-sports that only Walter excels at.
21	21	"Too Cool For Rules"	Kitty Taylor	Karen Reed	18 November 2020
Dennis and his mates rebel against an outbreak of unfair fun-killing rules that are being imposed on Beanotown.
22	22	"Do Good Dennis"	Kitty Taylor	Lisa Akhurst	19 November 2020
Dennis and Gnasher accidentally do good deeds for the people of Beanotown. They are so intrigued by the new sensation of being thanked and appreciated, that they go on a "helping rampage" leaving a wake of mayhem behind them!
23	23	"Lost"	Kitty Taylor	Chris Corcoran	20 November 2020
Tricked into a town-wide clean-up operation, Dennis and Walter are paired up against their wills. When their bickering leads to them getting hopelessly lost, they're forced to cooperate to survive in the wilderness of Beanotown Woods.
24	24	"The Great Beanotown Comic Con"	Kitty Taylor	Alex Collier	23 November 2020
The gang produce a hand-drawn comic which is a surprise hit all round Beanotown. Envious of their success, Walter embarks on a mission of cartoon-drawing sabotage.
25	25	"Cavern Creatures"	Kitty Taylor	Ben Ward	24 November 2020
Deep in the Caverns below Beanotown Town Hall, a mysterious species of over-sized hamsters may or may not exist, so may or may not be at risk of being hunted down and turned into fluffy slippers.
26	26	"Teacher Off"	Kitty Taylor	Isabel Fay	25 November 2020
Miss Mistry and Mrs Creecher clash over the best way to teach Class 3C about butterflies. Dennis and his mates just want to get the day's learning out of the way so they can get out of school and make it to a Grizzly Griller Wildlife Event.
27	27	"The Bash Street Bogeyman"	Kitty Taylor	Matt Baker	18 January 2021
In the run-up to the school play which Pieface is writing and directing, spooky goings-on around the school make the gang wonder if the mythical Bash Street Bogeyman might be real, and still stalking the corridors….
28	28	"Chez Bash"	Kitty Taylor	Isabel Fay	19 January 2021
When Olive surprises herself and everyone around her by actually becoming a good cook, Dr Pfooflepfeffer tries to cash in by turning the school canteen into an exclusive and super-expensive dining experience.
29	29	"Screwtop School"	Kitty Taylor	Tim Bain	20 January 2021
Rubi's Dad gets mistaken for the new kid in school and joins Class 3C for the day. Dennis loves having Professor von Screwtop as a classmate, but Rubi's so embarrassed at her dad's antics that she resorts to pranking to get him into trouble and out of the way.
30	30	"Learning to Lose"	Kitty Taylor	Matt Baker	21 January 2021
JJ applies for an elite sporting school. Not realising it's miles away from Beanotown, JJ needs to do badly in the sporting assessment to get out of it. But losing isn't something that comes naturally to JJ.
31	31	"Eco Worriers"	Kitty Taylor	Chris Corcoran	22 January 2021
Dennis and the gang take on the power of WilburCorp, to stop Walter's new line of collectable toys ruining the Beanotown environment with all its wasteful plastic packaging.
32	32	"The Beat Goes On"	Kitty Taylor	Isabel Fay	25 January 2021
Rubi's dance-machine invention gets accidentally muddled up with Crusty the Robot Pie's coding. Dennis and Gnasher have to dance on it all day in perfect sync, or Crusty's entire persona will be wiped forever!
33	33	"Hands Off"	Kitty Taylor	Alex Collier	26 January 2021
A patch of wet cement; a boy and a dog itching to put their prints into it; and a policeman determined not to let that happen. Can Dennis and Gnasher muddle Sergeant Slipper long enough before the cement sets?
34	34	"The Artful Gnasher"	Kitty Taylor	Lisa Akhurst	27 January 2021
When Dennis thinks Gnasher has trashed a valuable piece of hideous art, the gang try desperately to cover up the damage and produce a decoy that's as convincingly terrible as the original.
35	35	"The Order of the Golden Sausage"	Kitty Taylor	Ben Ward	28 January 2021
Dennis leads the gang on the baffling trail of a mysterious Beanotown secret society.
36	36	"WOAH! So Quiet"	Kitty Taylor	Karen Reed	29 January 2021
Walter and Dennis go head to head in a sponsored silence. Being quiet doesn't come naturally to either of them, as they struggle to make it through a chaotic school day and keep schtumm.
37	37	"JJ's Lucky Day"	Kitty Taylor	David Quantick	1 February 2021
The gang find out that JJ has a set of pre-match good-luck rituals. In the run-up to an important Blamjitsu event, Walter deviously throws bad-luck omens into JJ's path, threatening her chances of success.
38	38	"Partners in Crime"	Kitty Taylor	Andrew Emerson	2 February 2021
Whilst helping Sergeant Slipper prove that he has what it takes to remain Beanotown's policeman, the gang unknowingly become entangled in Doctor Pfooflepfeffer's real theft.
39	39	"The Hairy Wiggler"	Kitty Taylor	Lisa Akhurst	3 February 2021
Dennis dresses Gnasher up as a rare breed of animal which he says is nesting in Bash Street School – hoping to get the school shut down on the day of a daunting and difficult test.
40	40	"Gnasher Dash"	Kitty Taylor	Isabel Fay	1 March 2021
Gnasher is practically immobile inside a full-body cast. When he goes missing, Dennis and the gang race all over Beanotown to find him, always one step behind the helpless hound.
41	41	"Monitors"	Kitty Taylor	Alex Collier	2 March 2021
A classmate who Dennis and Walter barely know gets appointed as Class 3C's late monitor, making it urgent that the boys find a way to pal up with him, whatever it takes.
42	42	"Dozing Dennis"	Kitty Taylor	Matt Baker	3 March 2021
Dennis was up most of the night and can barely stay awake. Gnasher and the gang work hard to help steer dozing Dennis through the day when all he wants to do is continue to dream about battling Zombie-Spiders.
43	43	"Failing To Register"	Kitty Taylor	Matt Baker	4 March 2021
Determined to prove he can accomplish a task without getting distracted, Dennis takes on the simple job of bringing the class register to the school office. He instantly distracts himself on an epic scale.
44	44	"School Of Life"	Kitty Taylor	Chris Corcoran	5 March 2021
Miss Mistry arranges to tag along with Dennis and the gang after school, in an attempt to enhance her teaching skills and prevent school governor Pfooflepfeffer from banning her beloved teaching magazine.
45	45	"Finding Scruffbutt"	Kitty Taylor	Karen Reed	8 March 2021
It's Pieface's turn to look after the class hamster, Space Captain Harrison McScruff-Butt. His own self doubt and Walter's resolve to sabotage him lead to a rescue mission to free Scruff-Butt from Walter's mansion.
46	46	"Never-Ending Weekend"	Kitty Taylor	Matt Baker	9 March 2021
Dennis and the gang convince Mrs Creecher that Monday is actually Sunday in the hope of extending their weekend.
47	47	"Be More Dog"	Kitty Taylor	Andrew Emerson	10 March 2021
Dennis can't get Grizzly's new animal training method to work on a wilful Gnasher.
48	48	"Smarty Pants"	Kitty Taylor	Alex Collier	11 March 2021
Dennis is mega-excited to trail a pair of high-tech Smarty Pants.
49	49	"Puppy Love"	Kitty Taylor	Isabel Fay	12 March 2021
There's a new tripe hound in Beanotown, and Gnasher falls head over paws in love with her.
50	50	"Eventful Tentacales"	Kitty Taylor	Karen Reed	15 March 2021
An order mix-up leads to a delivery of hyperactive tentacles at Bash Street School.
51	51	"Bash Streets Back Alright"	Kitty Taylor	Andrew Emerson	16 March 2021
Dennis and the gang imagine all the things that might be new at Bash Street School.
52	52	"Growing Pains"	Kitty Taylor	Alex Collier	17 March 2021
The kids of Beanotown decide that they can run the town far better than the grown-ups.

== Reception ==
In its first week, it was the highest rated show on CBBC and overall the 10th most-watched programme for 6–12 year olds alongside The X Factor and Strictly Come Dancing.
