= Oliver Farnworth =

English actor (born 1982)

- Born: 5 August 1982 (age 44); Halifax, West Yorkshire, England
- Education: Bristol Old Vic
- Occupation: Actor
- Employer: ITV
- Television: Mr. Selfridge; Coronation Street; Emmerdale
- Partner: Samantha Womack (2019–present)

Oliver Farnworth (born 5 August 1982) is an English actor. As well as appearing in various theatre productions, including West End theatre roles, Farnworth has also appeared as a regular character in two ITV1 soap operas: Andy Carver in Coronation Street (2014–2017) and John Sugden in Emmerdale (2024–2026). His other television appearances include recurring roles in The Royal (2008–2009) and Mr Selfridge (2014).

== Life and career ==
Farnworth was brought up just outside Halifax in Hebden Bridge, West Yorkshire, but moved to Sidmouth in Devon when he was fifteen. He trained at the Bristol Old Vic Theatre School. He first came to recognition in Hollyoaks playing Will Hackett from September 2006 to May 2007.

Before appearing in Hollyoaks, Farnworth appeared on stage in The Lion, the Witch and the Wardrobe and in The London Plays, written by Ed Hime and directed by Kelly Wilkinson. He has also appeared in three episodes of ITV1's 1960s medical drama The Royal, playing a character called Nev Cartwright. In 2008, Farnworth played the leading role in Saturday Night and Sunday Morning at the Harrogate Theatre, and Lysander with the British Shakespeare Company in A Midsummer Night's Dream. In 2009 he appeared in The Merchant of Venice at Penshurst Place Gardens in Kent. In April 2010, Farnworth appeared in the West End theatre production of Holding the Man at the Trafalgar Theatre.

In 2014, Farnworth played Florian Dupont, a Belgian refugee, in the TV series Mr Selfridge before joining the cast of Coronation Street as Andy Carver; his departure was announced in 2016. His last scene, aired on 20 January 2017, saw him being supposedly killed by Pat Phelan (Connor McIntyre). However, on 18 August 2017, Farnworth made an unexpected and unannounced return; revealing that Phelan was in fact, holding him captive in the cellar of an abandoned house until his death on 27 October 2017. In 2019, he has appeared in the TV Series Endeavour, playing the role of PC Rich Potter. Farnworth joined the cast of Emmerdale in 2024, playing John Sugden. His first episode aired on 7 August 2024.

== Filmography ==
Year	Title	Role	Notes
2006–2007	Hollyoaks	Will Hackett	Guest role
2008–2009	The Royal	Neville Cartwright	Recurring role
2012	Doctors	Tom Davis	Episode: "The Way to a Man's Heart"
2013	Beautiful Thing	Tony	Film
2014	Mr Selfridge	Florian Dupont	Recurring role
2014	Canned	Craig	Short film
2014–2017	Coronation Street	Andy Carver	Regular role
2018	The Girl on the Train	Scott Hipwell	Film
2019	Endeavour	PC Rich Potter	Episode: "Confection"
2019	Love Type D	Thomas	Film
2024–2026	Emmerdale	John Sugden	Regular role

== Awards and nominations ==
Year	Ceremony	Award	Nominated work	Result	Ref.
2025	TV Choice Awards	Best Newcomer	Emmerdale	Nominated	
2025	Inside Soap Awards	Best Villain	Emmerdale	Pending	
