= Beth Kingston =

English actress

- Born: 3 November 1986 (age 39); Bournemouth, England
- Occupation: Actress
- Known for: Hollyoaks (2009–2012)

Beth Kingston (born 3 November 1986) is an English actress best known for playing India Longford in the British soap opera Hollyoaks from 2009 to 2010. India was killed-off in 2010 but Kingston reprised the role and returned in 2011 and 2012 as a vision to her sister.

Kingston trained at the Redroofs Film and Television School. In 2009 she auditioned for the role of India in Hollyoaks Desperately Seeking, a competition run by Hollyoaks. She won the competition.

She has also worked in pantomime.

== Filmography ==
Year	Title	Role	Notes
2009–2012	Hollyoaks	India Longford	Former Series regular
