= Kelly-Marie Stewart =

British actress (born 1984)

- Born: 1984 (age 41–42); Liverpool, England
- Occupation: Actress
- Years active: 2009–present
- Known for: Hollyoaks
- Children: 3
- Website: www.kellymariestewart.com

Kelly-Marie Stewart (born 1984) is a British actress, best known for playing Hayley Ramsey, the younger sister of already established character Zak Ramsey in Channel 4's teen soap opera Hollyoaks. Stewart voices the Beano character Rubi Von Screwtop for the CBBC hit show Dennis & Gnasher: Unleashed!.

== Career ==
After attending the Liverpool Theatre School, Stewart appeared in several TV adverts before landing her big break on the soap.

Stewart is the first disabled actress to act as a main character in Hollyoaks. She has Guillain–Barré syndrome – an autoimmune disorder affecting the peripheral nervous system which usually exhibits as an ascending paralysis noted by weakness in the legs. Stewart lost the use of her legs when she was twenty-one. She left Hollyoaks in 2010 when she became pregnant with her eldest child.

Stewart has worked on various projects since having her daughter and voices the character Rubi Von Screwtop for the Beano show Dennis & Gnasher Unleashed on CBBC & Uk Netflix. Stewart also voices the U.S. Netflix version of the show.

== Personal life ==
Stewart is a campaigner for specialist advice and support for disabled mothers in caring for young children. She is also the official ambassador for the Muscular Dystrophy Campaign and a patron of Disabled Parents Network. She is a patron for the charity Abigail's Footsteps and works closely with them.
