= Sonny Flood =

English actor (b. 1989)

- Born: Sonny Flood; 18 November 1989 (age 36); Blackpool, England
- Occupation: Actor
- Years active: 2001–2012

Sonny Flood (born 18 November 1989) is an English actor.

== Background ==
Born in Blackpool, Lancashire, Flood was educated at Rossall School, near Fleetwood. In 2006 Flood passed ten GCSE exams all at either A or A*. In 2007, he achieved 4 'A's at AS level, in English Literature, History, Media Studies and Philosophy, and in 2008 he achieved a grade 'A' in English Literature and a grade 'B' in History at A2 level. He decided to take just two subjects, at A2 level, allowing him to concentrate on working for Hollyoaks.

== Career ==
In 2001 Flood had a minor part in an episode of Cold Feet as David. He had another minor role in 2003 in an episode of Heartbeat, playing the character Dean Farley.

=== Hollyoaks ===
His first major role came in 2005 when he was cast as Josh Ashworth in Channel 4 soap opera Hollyoaks. In 2009 he appeared for the first time in the annual Hollyoaks Hunks calendar. He also appeared in the 2010 calendar. In February 2010 he was removed from the series along with 15 existing cast members by incoming producer Paul Marquess. However he managed to get an agreement that his character would depart some time after his on-screen family.

Sonny returned to Hollyoaks in May 2012 for 2 episodes.

=== After Hollyoaks ===
He appeared as a young cyclist whose leg was broken in an attack by local yobs in an episode of Casualty which first aired on BBC1 on 4 December 2010. Feb 28th 2011 he appeared as Jez Field in BBC1 daytime drama Doctors.

== Personal life ==
Flood is a fan of his hometown football club Blackpool and in September 2009 appeared, alongside seven other Blackpool supporters, on Sky Sports Saturday-morning football show Soccer AM as part of the "Fans of the week".
