= Andy Moss =

English actor (born 1984)

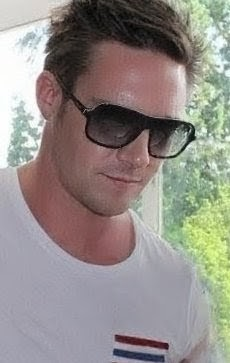
- Moss in 2012
- Born: Andrew Moss; 1 June 1984 (age 42); Manchester, England
- Occupation: Actor
- Years active: 2002–present
- Spouse: Mark Bennett (m. 2025)

Andrew Moss (born 1 June 1984) is an English actor. Moss began his career with small roles in British drama series. In 2005, Moss secured the role of Rhys Ashworth in the British soap opera Hollyoaks. He played the character for seven years until the character was killed off. He also appeared in the fellow soap opera Doctors as Paul Cuthbert. From 2017, Moss pursued his West End theatre career, securing lead roles. In 2024, he played the titular character in Frank's Closet, which became his most prominent stage role.

== Career ==
Moss trained at the North Cheshire Theatre College, where he earned a Diploma in Drama. He also attended Sheena SimonB College, where he also obtained a National Diploma in musical theatre.

Moss' first television role came in 2002, playing Peter in the police procedural drama series, Merseybeat. In 2003, he played Ryan in the CITV series, Girls in Love. In 2005, Moss gained multiple television roles. He played the Craig Gutteridge, a gay character, in the BBC drama series Cutting It. He appeared as David in an episode of the soap opera, Doctors. He then joined the cast of the fellow soap opera, Hollyoaks playing the regular role of Rhys Ashworth.

In 2010, Hollyoaks' producer, Paul Marquess decided to write out the Ashworth family apart from Rhys and Moss remained in the series. Moss played the role for seven years until 2012. He decided to leave the series and the producers decided to kill his character off in a bus crash storyline.

In 2013, he starred in one episode of Casualty as Freddie Drummond. Moss originally auditioned for another role, which casting directors did not think he suited and instead offered him the more villainous role of Freddie. Later that year, Moss played Anton in a Beauty and the Beast pantomime at The Brindley. In 2014, Moss reprised his role as Rhys for a guest stint, despite his character being killed off. Moss agreed to return because it facilitated a fellow character's mental health storyline. In 2016, Moss returned to Doctors, this time playing the recurring role of Paul Cuthbert.

In 2017, Moss began his West End theatre career by played the role of Sam Wheat in the National tour of Ghost the Musical. In 2018, Moss played the lead role of Prince Gawain in Knights of the Rose at Arts Theatre, London. In 2019, Moss played the regular role of Jimmy Heywood in the television series, Deep Cuts. In 2024, Moss played the titular role in the queer theatre musical production, Frank's Closet. He first played the role during a run at Union Theatre, London. The show was developed and given a bigger run at Wilton's Music Hall.

In 2026, Moss appeared as Eddie in the Channel 4 drama series, Tip Toe.

== Personal life ==
In June 2022, Moss announced his engagement to his partner, Mark Bennett. They married in Greece in July 2025. Moss is a qualified yoga teacher after completing a course in India.

== Filmography ==
Year	Title	Role	Notes
2002	Merseybeat	Peter	Guest role
2003	Coronation Street	Lozza Jones	Guest role
2005	Girls in Love	Ryan	Guest role
2005	Cutting It	Craig Gutteridge	Recurring role
2005	Doctors	David Leavis	Guest role
2005–2012, 2014	Hollyoaks	Rhys Ashworth	Regular role
2005	Hollyoaks: No Going Back	Rhys Ashworth	Regular role
2008–2009	Hollyoaks Later	Rhys Ashworth	Regular role
2009	Hollyoaks: The Morning After the Night Before	Rhys Ashworth	Regular role
2013	Casualty	Freddie Drummond	Guest role
2014	Mannequins	George	Short film
2016	Doctors	Paul Cuthbert	Recurring role
2019	Deep Cuts	Jimmy Heywood	Regular role
2026	Tip Toe	Eddie	Guest role
