= Hollie-Jay Bowes =

English actress (born 1989)

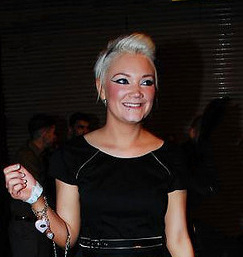
- Bowes in 2009
- Born: Hollie Jean Bowes; 17 January 1989 (age 37); Oldham, Greater Manchester, England
- Occupation: Actress
- Years active: 2005–present
- Television: Grange Hill; Hollyoaks; Waterloo Road

Hollie-Jay Bowes (née Billie-Jean Bowes; born 17 January 1989) is an English actress and writer, known for her roles as Dawn O'Malley in the BBC drama Grange Hill and Michaela McQueen in the Channel 4 soap opera Hollyoaks. Since 2023, she has appeared in the BBC drama Waterloo Road as Debs Rafferty.

== Life and career ==
Bowes' parents changed her name from Billie Jean to Hollie Jean as her father thought she would get bullied at school and be called 'Billie Bowes', and at 13, she changed her name to Hollie-Jay. In 2009, Bowes stated in an interview with Inside Soap that she is a distant relation to Hollyoaks co-star Tony Hirst, who plays Mike Barnes.

For two years, Bowes portrayed Dawn O'Malley in the children's television series Grange Hill before being cast in Hollyoaks when she was 15. On 24 June 2010, Bowes announced on Twitter that had decided to leave Hollyoaks after four years. Producers wrote her out at the earliest opportunity due to her making the announcement without informing the production. In September 2011, Hollie-Jay reprised her role as Michaela McQueen in the series Hollyoaks Later and returned to the main series in October, but departed again in August 2012.

In 2010, Bowes formed a band named Jeanie and The Radiator.

In 2018, she appeared in the third series of the police procedural drama No Offence. Bowes also narrated the ITN show Supersize Me.

In 2023, Bowes began appearing in the BBC drama Waterloo Road playing suffering mother Debs Rafferty. The same year, Bowes announced that she had been diagnosed with attention deficit hyperactivity disorder.
