= Loretta Jones =

British soap opera character

- Hollyoaks character
- Portrayed by: Melissa Walton
- Duration: 2009–2010
- First appearance: 6 February 2009
- Last appearance: 27 July 2010
- Introduced by: Lucy Allan
- Spin-off appearances: Hollyoaks Later (2008)
In-universe information
- Occupation: Pole dancer

Loretta Jones is a fictional character from the British Channel 4 soap opera Hollyoaks, and its spin-off series, Hollyoaks Later. The character is played by Melissa Walton and first appeared on-screen on 26 November 2008 during the first series of the Hollyoaks spin-off Hollyoaks Later as a new love interest for the character Dominic Reilly (John Pickard). She made her first appearance in the Hollyoaks series in February 2009 and was the first character to be introduced to the series by producer Lucy Allan. In 2010, Loretta was axed from the series, along with 15 other characters, during a cast cull by executive producer Paul Marquess.

The character development has Loretta having worked as a pole dancer and Walton put extensive research into the role, including visiting strip clubs. Despite this occupation Loretta has been portrayed out of conjunction with the blonde stereotype. She has been involved in storylines which include facing prejudice, body scarring issues and stalking fellow characters. The character is most noted for the series intending to portray her as a child murderer trying to piece her life back together. The plot was subsequently axed having caused a great amount of controversy among the British public after newspapers alleged that the storyline was copying a real-life case. Loretta has been positively received by the media for her appearance and has been dubbed a "blond bombshell". Before Loretta's departure from the series Marquess made changes to the characters persona: portraying her as a stalker being obsessive, calculating and pretending to have leukaemia. In her final storyline it was revealed that she had been sexually abused as a child and admitted herself to a psychiatric hospital.

== Creation and casting ==
The character of Loretta was created as a temporary love interest for Dominic Reilly (John Pickard) and was intended to feature only in Hollyoaks Later, the spin-off from the Hollyoaks series. In 2009 it was announced that the Hollyoaks' producer Lucy Allan had decided to introduce both Loretta and Cheryl Brady (Bronagh Waugh) into the main show. Allan said, "Cheryl and Loretta will bring an energy and a sense of fun to the show. Both Melissa and Bronagh impressed me with their performances in Hollyoaks Later and I'm sure viewers will warm to them quickly." Loretta was initially paired with Dom and, after ending their relationship, was given links to other characters in the series. Walton had a pole set up in her living room to practice pole dancing. Speaking of her research Walton stated: "I loved it. It's really good exercise. It's really good for toning. They didn't ask me to, but I did... I went and I had pole dancing classes. I had a pole put up in my living room."

Though Walton had initially signed on for a three-month stint Allan decided to renew her contract in 2009 and keep Loretta in the series until 2010. In early 2010 it was announced that Allan had stepped down from the position of executive producer and that Paul Marquess had taken over the role. It was soon revealed that Marquess planned to give Hollyoaks a "shake up", changing the productions team and beginning a cast cull by axing three established characters. Stephanie Waring (who plays Cindy Hutchinson) then revealed that all remaining cast members feared their own character would be axed. One month later Marquess announced his plans to axe a further 11 characters, including Loretta at the end of Walton's contract. It was also revealed that Loretta would depart at the same time as her love interest Jake Dean (Kevin Sacre).

On 8 June 2010 Walton filmed her final scenes for the series, along with two fellow cast members Scare and Gerard McCarthy (who plays Kris Fisher). She spoke of her upset over leaving her fellow cast members, but later said she was looking forward to pursuing other projects. Walton also confirmed that she was happy the door was left open for a potential return, stating that she would consider reprising her role as Loretta in the future. Walton also said she understood why Marquess axed her character, he did not feel Loretta had anywhere left to go after the cancellation of her main storyline. However, she also felt like she deserved another chance to prove herself.

== Development and impact ==
=== Characterisation ===
Loretta has stated on-screen that she does not want to conform with the stereotype of a blond pole dancer, and makes it clear that she is a keen bird watcher and enjoys documentaries. Speaking of the character Walton stated, "I love that Loretta's not a stereotypical stripper sort of girl—there’s a lot more depth to her. She’s actually quite shy and reserved. She’s got lots of interesting little hobbies, like bird-watching and Roman history! Then at night she skips off and turns into a stripper. It’s like two different lives, and I think many real-life pole-dancers are like that. They’re really nice, normal girls by day, and by night they turn into these temptresses." Walton also praised the soap's realistic portrayal of the occupation, saying that many pole dancers attend university or have good professions but rely on stripping for extra money, and that she has met people like her character in the strip club where Hollyoaks films scenes.

"She works as a stripper but is very quick to point out that it's not who she is, it's just her job, so I think what they've done is they've tried to have a massive contrast between who she is during the day, who they see her as in the village when she's with Dom, and who she turns into when she starts work at night."

— Melissa Walton discussing Loretta (2009).

Walton hopes viewers will find Loretta's alter ego as a stripper tasteful commenting, "As tasteful as you can be in a pink frilly bra and knicker set, with a little skirt that’s more like a belt, and back-combed hair and fake eyelashes!" Loretta's stripper clothing is in stark contrast to her every day look of non-revealing clothing.

Loretta's relationships helped develop the character. Her first relationship is with Dom Reilly who shares her interests in bird watching, documentaries on ancient Rome and literature. The relationship immediately gave viewers an insight into the character. However, as their relationship progressed, it became apparent that Dom could not handle Loretta's profession as he feared for her safety, which ultimately led to their break up. Loretta's second relationship is a short-lived fling with Ravi Roy (Stephen Uppal) where she is determined to see the good in him, and help him while he suffers from a brain aneurysm, but ends the relationship when he attempts to assault her. Loretta then begins a secret romance with Jake, who had tried to murder his child and rape his wife. Loretta believes he had been misled and is still a good person, demonstrating Loretta's willingness to give people second chances. Walton comments, "[Loretta] is just lovely – she sees the good in everyone." When television listings magazine What's on TV challenged Walton to explain why Loretta would be interested in Jake after his crimes Walton said, "Loretta's big on forgiveness. She believes Jake’s changed, that he's learnt from his time inside and he's paid his debt to society."

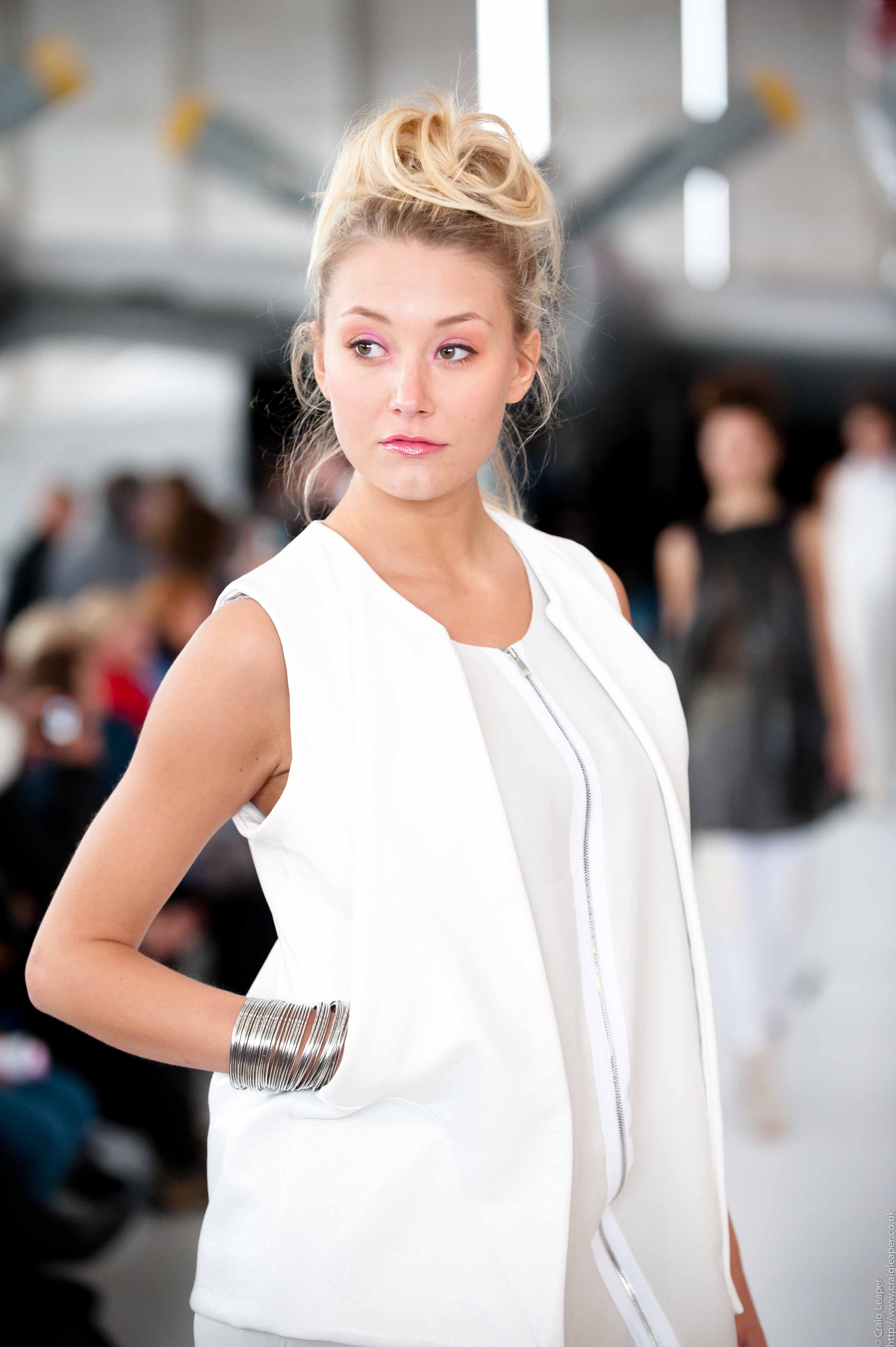
Melissa Walton (pictured) said Loretta pole dances to gain power over men.

After Marquess decided to axe Loretta he changed the character's direction and her persona. She became obsessive over men, controlling towards Jake, manipulative and began lying to get what she wanted. Jake later decides he does not want her, of this Walton states that: "She's not going anywhere. She's deluded and manipulative and he hasn't seen anything yet!" She also is shown have "bunny boiler" tendencies, with Walton agreeing to the label. Walton later revealed that Loretta began pole dancing to have power over men because of the abuse she suffered as a child although, as Loretta's exit approached, she was now a dangerous and deluded woman.

=== Child murderer controversy ===
In November 2009, Loretta became the centre of media controversy when various media outlets announced that Loretta would be part of a storyline which revealed that she had murdered a child in her past. The controversy began when tabloid newspaper revealed the mother of murdered toddler James Bulger, Denise Fergus, condemned the storyline. While speaking to the news website Click Liverpool, she criticised the decision to air a plot that allegedly mirrored her son's death, stating they should have consulted her first. She said, "I'm shocked and disgusted at what Hollyoaks is doing. They have clearly based this story on what happened to James and it's outrageous that they should do this without consulting with me in any way." She threatened to encourage a boycott of the show. Channel 4 released a statement defending the plot, explaining it had nothing to do with any real life case: "The forthcoming storyline is not based on any real-life case and it will in no way seek to recreate real events. The storyline focuses on the psychological repercussions for two characters in the show who were responsible for the death of a 12-year-old girl in the past."

Speaking about delving into her character's history Walton commented to entertainment website Digital Spy, "It took a little while and until now, we've known little about her. Nobody in the village knows who she is or where she's come from. She's just planted herself in the village knowing hardly anybody. She's quite a mysterious character. I'm absolutely loving the opportunity to explore her backstory." Speaking about her reaction to the plot she continued, "I was like, 'Oh my gosh!' I was so shocked but absolutely chuffed to bits because this is what all actors want – something massive like this to sink my teeth into. I feel so privileged that they've trusted me with this story. I know they've wanted to do it for a while and they've finally chosen me!"

In the same interview, Walton described the storyline, "Loretta and Chrissy were best, best friends through childhood. They were closer than sisters. She somehow tracks Loretta down and turns up out of the blue after Loretta's finished a dance class. What we learn is that when they were 12, they bullied a young girl and didn't stop until they killed her. They kept pushing and pushing and eventually killed her. Since then, Loretta and Chrissy have been completely separated from each other, their families and friends. They've spent years in institutions having psychiatric and behavioural treatment."

Chrissy reminds Loretta of her secret past in scenes cut from transmitted episodes. (2009)

Kevin Sacre, whose character was directly involved in the storyline, voiced his support for the plot stating: "I think the fact that it's the sort of thing that happens in real life means it's something that should be addressed. Anyone who buries their head in the sand is a bit naïve. And I think soap is a medium where you can explore issues of real life."

Just days before the episodes were set to transmit Channel 4 announced that it was axing the storyline, due in part to Fergus's reaction to the storyline. Whilst Walton had previously claimed the storyline was about three twelve-year-old girls, Channel 4 admitted the similarities between the story and the Bulger case. "This particular storyline was not based on any real life case and was not intended to recreate actual events. However, after conversations with Denise Fergus we have agreed to amend certain aspects of the storyline." Amber Hodgkiss, who was cast to play Chrissy, expressed her disappointment over the decision to axe the plot all together saying, "The storyline has been completely cut. I am not so happy about it. I would like it to go ahead, but I don't have that decision. It wasn't based on Jamie Bulger, but people portrayed it that way. It was quite a big storyline that could affect people, but it happens." Fergus said she was grateful that the plot was axed saying, "I'm grateful that they are respecting my wishes. I made it clear that I did not want those scenes broadcast and I'm pleased to say they clearly understood my feelings."

When episodes that were intended to feature the storyline transmitted, they instead featured a selection of then "last minute" scenes. In these scenes Hodgkiss portrays a new character, Caroline, who holds Loretta and Jake hostage.

=== Stalker and exit storyline ===
Walton's exit from the series was described as dramatic, with Walton commenting on this during an interview with magazine programme Live from Studio Five stating, "I'm very pleased with my exit, you know. I'm very, very pleased with what I've been given and I've really enjoyed doing it. I've probably enjoyed the last few months of filming more than I've enjoyed anything else that I've done, to be honest."

“My character was redundant and there was nothing he [Marquess] could have done to turn that around. A new producer wants to come in and put his own stamp on a show and do his own thing. He does not want to be sorting out previous problems.”

— Melissa Walton discussing Loretta's axing (2010).

Loretta's backstory gradually began to unfold on-screen. Loretta decided she needed to win Jake back. Her ex-boyfriend Adam (Vlach Ashton) warned Jake that Loretta had previously stalked him. This starts to damage their relationship and during an interview with What's on TV Walton commented on it saying that Jake was suspicious of Loretta's motives. Loretta love for Jake turned into an obsession with Walton saying, "She's definitely not giving up on him. What he thought was love is already actually an obsession. She wants to totally control him". The story line reveals her past of obsessions with men and Walton stated, "You sense Adam wasn't the only ex-partner she stalked. She has a mobile full of men's numbers." Walton explains the cause of her behaviour, "You find out much later on that it's because of something that happened in her past. Her obsession really is getting full-on [...] She's jealous of anybody who gets Jake's attention." After Jake's sister Steph Cunningham (Carley Stenson) is diagnosed with cervical cancer Loretta pretends she once had leukaemia in order to trap Jake. He throws her out though because his son had previously suffered from the illness. Loretta refuses to give up and her behaviour becomes more erratic.

In the final episodes of her departure Loretta manages to convince everyone that Jake was mentally ill once more. She takes Nancy Hayton (Jessica Fox) hostage for snooping into her life with Adam and Walton states, "Loretta is dangerous and deluded, Nancy's terrified of her – she tries to escape but Loretta won't let her She accidentally pushes Nancy, who crashes into a table and bangs her head badly". Walton also revealed more of Loretta's past saying, "Adam confesses that Loretta was violent towards him, basically she did some awful things to him that she's doing to Jake now." The storyline sought to explain all the unanswered questions left in her backstory with Walton saying, "He [Jake] tries to talk her round, and at that point she reveals she was sexually abused when she was very young. It's supposedly the reason she went into stripping to have power over men." Walton also defended Loretta's final actions, saying the character was confused and did not mean to hurt anyone. In Loretta's final scene she voluntarily admits herself into a psychiatric hospital after being convinced to by Jake.

== Storylines ==
Loretta first appears as a stripper who works in a lap-dancing club. During her job Loretta meets Dom. The pair like each other but she decides not to go out with him, she feels he is not yet over the death of his wife Tina (Leah Hackett).

Loretta is not seen again until February 2009, when she and Dom begin a relationship. Loretta clashes with Mercedes Fisher (Jennifer Metcalfe) who is not happy to find out that Dom has moved on from Tina. Loretta moves in with Cindy Cunningham (Stephanie Waring) and Darren Osborne (Ashley Taylor Dawson). Loretta lies to Dom saying she has quit her job and does not tell him the truth until Darren finds out and begins to blackmail her. Loretta then quits her job for Dom, but later finds a new job as a stripper at a different club. Dom worries about Loretta's safety at her job and gives her a rape alarm, much to her amusement. Loretta reassures him, but realises how serious it is for him when he reveals that Tina's abduction and death has left him uptight about safety. They then end their relationship.

Loretta drunkenly teaches Nancy Hayton (Jessica Fox), Zoe Carpenter (Zoë Lister), Hannah Ashworth (Emma Rigby) and Sarah Barnes (Loui Batley) how to dance in the Student Union bar. She slips and falls onto some glass bottles which break and cut her stomach. Loretta is horrified when she is left scarred by the glass. Her boss sacks her, because her scars have rendered her unattractive, and Loretta is given a job in Tan & Tumble by Ash Roy (Junade Khan). Loretta develops a crush on Ravi Roy which makes his brother Ash jealous. After Loretta catches Ravi being violent towards his sister Leila (Lena Kaur) she distances herself from him and Ash starts flirting with her. Ash kisses Loretta and Ravi sees it and lashes out at. This leads an angry Ravi to fight in an illegal boxing match. After Ravi taunts Ash he punches Ravi, who was diagnosed with an aneurysm, and Ravi falls into a coma. Loretta explains to Kris Fisher (Gerard McCarthy) and Anita Roy (Saira Choudhry) that Ash tried to kiss her, which Kris believes and Ash tries to deny.

Loretta gradually becomes good friends with Nancy and Hannah. When Nancy's abusive ex-husband Jake Dean, who tried to rape her and kill his and his ex-wife Becca's son Charlie (Joshua McConville), returns to the village Loretta consoles Nancy and moves in with her. Loretta grows close to Jake and, although initially hesitant, forms a relationship with him. After Jake and Loretta go public, Loretta is kicked out by Nancy and moves in with Jake. When Jake's sister Steph Cunningham (Carley Stenson) suggests the pair are moving too quickly Loretta agrees, she talks to Jake who gets angry showing his temper to Loretta for the first time. The couple reconcile with the help of Steph. Loretta strikes up a friendship with Holly Hutchinson (Lydia Waters) who aspires to be a dancer like Loretta after feeling unnoticed by her mother Cindy. As they bond Loretta gives Holly advice on dancing. Loretta faces prejudice when she starts applying for new jobs, as no one will employ her due to her previous jobs as a stripper. She later lies during an interview, her interviewers discover her previous employment and make derogatory remarks to her.

Holly runs away from home and a large-scale police investigation is put in place to find her. Many other residents in the village suspect Loretta's boyfriend Jake of being her kidnapper, unaware that she is safe and hiding in Darren's flat. Loretta leaves Jake after she begins to doubt his innocence but later reconciles with him. After Jake finds Holly he chases her, she falls over and takes a blow to the head and falls into a coma. Initially the police suspect that Jake was behind this but later release him. Loretta once more begins to doubt him. Upset, Jake goes to stay with his old friend Caroline (Amber Hodgkiss). After sleeping with him Caroline drugs him, ties him up, tries to kill him, and holds him hostage for a few days. She is angered to learn he is going out with Loretta and sets out to try to kill Holly but Loretta is there by Holly's bedside. Caroline tries to attack Loretta with a syringe needle but Jake saves Loretta and, in the process, Caroline is stabbed with the needle. After the ordeal Loretta disappears, having to accept the fact that Jake had cheated on her much to his dismay. She returns but while she was away Loretta had become involved with a realtor called Adam. At first Jake thought she was looking for a home. However, when he saw them both arguing, Jake realises something was not as it seemed. When Jake confronts Loretta she tells him that Adam was harassing her. This leads to Jake confronting Adam and warning him to stay away from Loretta. However Adam tells him that Loretta had been controlling his life and that she wants to be with him. Adam explains that Loretta had told him about Jake and that he was the biggest mistake of her life in the hope that Adam would take her back.

Later she goes on a night out to The Loft nightclub and threatens Charlotte Lau (Amy Yamazaki). She says that she will kill Lau if she ever goes near Jake again, making viewers realise that Loretta had changed her personality and her behaviour since her absence. Loretta pretends she had Leukaemia but Jake finds out the truth and ends their relationship. She later convinces Steph that Jake lied when he told Steph that Loretta had said she was ill and she makes Frankie and Steph believe Jake is losing his mind again. She send messages from Jake's mobile phone and plants defaced pictures of her and Jake in his coat to make it look real. Loretta reveals to Steph that she was sexually abused as a child. Jake gets back together with Loretta to stop her from getting him put back into a mental health clinic. Nancy finds out the truth about Loretta from Adam, she confronts Loretta who pushes her over and Nancy is badly hurt. Jake saves Nancy and she agrees not to go to the police. Loretta reveals she did not lie when she was sexually abused and Jake asks her to get help and will stand by her. Loretta is last seen admitting herself into the hospital.

== Reception ==
Loretta has been well received for her good looks and "sexy" image. According to British tabloid The Daily Star the character was extremely popular with viewers on Hollyoaks Later and "went down a storm" with them. They also add that she rivals other characters such as Carmel Valentine (Gemma Merna) and Mercedes Fisher (Jennifer Metcalfe) with her "hot babe" image. Loretta has been noted in the media because of her "sexy blonde" image. When she was axed from the series a magazine dedicated to "sexually attractive females" titled Babemag commented that the series would not be the same without her and praised Walton's portrayal, stating, "Sundays may never be quite the same as news filters through that Hollyoaks star, Melissa Walton, is to get the chop from the teen soap. Horny Hollyoaks hangover TV might not be the same for us without the charms of Melissa Walton who plays Loretta Jones in the series." She has also been dubbed a "blonde bombshell" by media sources such as Digital Spy and the South Wales Evening Post. Five's soap opera reporting website Holy Soap describe Loretta's finest moment as her food fight with Mercedes when they clashed over Dom. Jon Horsley writing for Yahoo! included Loretta's child killer plot in a feature about soap opera's most controversial storylines.
