= List of Hollyoaks Later episodes =

Below is a list of episodes of the British television series of Hollyoaks Later, which aired originally on E4 with a repeat on Channel 4

The first series of Hollyoaks Later was originally named Late Night Hollyoaks and first broadcast five episodes over the course of the week beginning 24 November 2008 and ending on the 28. It was produced by Lucy Allan, who succeeded Bryan Kirkwood as the Hollyoaks producer in 2009. The series fared well in the ratings and in 2009, a second series was commissioned and broadcast over five nights beginning on 28 September 2009. The second series was produced by Bryan Kirkwood. A third series was soon commissioned and began broadcasting over five nights on the week of 25 October 2010. The third series was produced by Paul Marquess. On 4 March 2011 Channel 4 had commissioned a fourth series due to be broadcast during five nights a week in Autumn 2011. In May 2012, it was announced Hollyoaks Later would be returning for a fifth series.. The show also returned for a sixth series in 2013 and two one off specials in 2020 and 2025.

== Episodes ==
=== Series 1 (2008) ===
No. overall	No. in series	Title	Directed by	Written by	Original release date	UK viewers (millions)
1	1	"Episode One"	Tracey Rooney	Heather Robson	24 November 2008	0.89
2	2	"Episode Two"	Tracey Rooney	Richard Burke	25 November 2008	0.85
3	3	"Episode Three"	Steve Brett	Chris Gill	26 November 2008	0.78
4	4	"Episode Four"	Steve Brett	Steven Fay	27 November 2008	0.76
5	5	"Episode Five"	Alex Kalymnios	Jessica Lea	28 November 2008	0.68

=== Series 1 (2008) ===
No. overall	No. in series	Title	Directed by	Written by	Original release date	UK viewers (millions)
6	1	"Episode One"	Alex Kalymnios	Daran Little	24 November 2008	0.67
Craig Dean (Guy Burnet) takes his sister Steph Cunningham (Carley Stenson) and her brother-in-law Tom (Ellis Hollins) to a secluded spot in Scotland, however they are unaware of a mystery follower - Niall Rafferty (Barry Sloane). Kris (Gerard McCarthy) and Malachy Fisher (Glen Wallace) head home to Ireland with their father Eamon's (Derek Halligan) ashes. Malachy tries to find the words to tell his mother of his HIV, however he and Kris's ex-girlfriends turn up wanting answers. Mercedes (Jennifer Metcalfe) decides to head to Belfast to tell Malachy she loves him and is accompanied by Zak Ramsey (Kent Riley) and Elliot Bevan (Garnon Davies). Nancy Hayton (Jessica Fox), Zoe Carpenter (Zoë Lister) and Sarah Barnes (Loui Batley) head off on a road trip where the girls stop at Zoe's old school. She is shocked to find she still holds feelings for her first love - who was her teacher. Sarah is angry that Zoe is using her father and the pair end up fighting in the playground. Josh Ashworth (Sonny Flood) tries to convince the Dirty Diegos: Amy Barnes (Ashley Slanina-Davies), Michaela McQueen (Hollie-Jay Bowes) and Sasha Valentine (Nathalie Emmanuel), to head off to Liverpool to the "Battle of the Bands". The girls are reluctant until they hear the winning band will support The Saturdays.
7	2	"Episode Two"	Alex Kalymnios	Heather Robson	25 November 2008	0.65
Steph grows scared of the Scottish hills. Craig takes naturist Pete out of her way to give her peace, however as she sleeps, Niall breaks in. Mercedes, Zak and Elliot reach a bar in Belfast, Zak accidentally offends the locals leading to the group having to make a run for it. Kris tries to make his hometown locals understand his dress sense and also urges Malachy to tell their mother the truth, however Erin has a secret of her own. Sarah is devastated when a photographer tells her she is not what model scouts go for as Nancy and Zoe race on a track. Josh accidentally reveals the personal lives of his band members while trying to promote their music.
8	3	"Episode Three"	Sean Glynn	Neil Jones	26 November 2008	0.60
As the Dirty Diegos prepare their audition, the girls are star-struck in front of The Saturdays. Steph and Craig are distraught on finding Tom has gone missing. The mystery kidnapper reveals himself and tells Steph he wants to meet, however Tom escapes. Mercedes finally arrives to see Malachy, but finds him more than comfortable with his ex-girlfriend. Dominic Reilly (John Pickard) wakes up with a sore head and finds a mysterious shoe in his room. He is mortified to discover he spent the night in a strip club before bringing back a dancer. He heads off in search of the lap dancer and accuses her of stealing from him.
9	4	"Episode Four"	Sean Glynn	Chris Gill	27 November 2008	0.60
Niall takes Steph to the top of a cliff as Craig is tied up. Naturist Pete arrives and frees Craig. Niall tries to get Steph to tell him she loves him, however after she tells him he killed the love of her life, Niall realises he has nothing to live for and lets himself drop from the high cliff. Zoe and Sarah take Nancy out to bars and set her up on a date - who turns out to be Russ Owen (Stuart Manning). Ravi Roy (Stephen Uppal) turns up to make it up to Nancy. A drunken Sarah and Zoe head back to the hotel where they have a heart to heart, which leads to the pair having passionate sex. Mercedes does not get along with Malachy's mother, who is horrified to discover their plans to marry. After he calls off the wedding, Mercedes announces Malachy's HIV to his town. Meanwhile, Dom goes back to see Loretta. He is clearly attracted and the pair end up having a meal together.
10	5	"Episode Five"	Steve Brett	Cameron McAllister and Neil Jones	28 November 2008	0.68
Josh tells the Dirty Diegos he would rather look after Amy's baby than win at the gig. Mercedes head home to Hollyoaks, however, with some help from Kris and Cheryl Brady (Bronagh Waugh), she ends up marrying Malachy. Michaela turns up just in time to be bridesmaid. Craig takes a shaken Steph and Tom home. Sarah feels guilty after her and Zoe's night of passion. After heading home, she bumps into her ex-fiancé Craig. After verbally abusing him, she leaves not being able to look at Zoe in the eye. Loretta and Dom continue their romantic days together. Dom feels he has truly found the love of his life, however Loretta realises he is not fully over the death of wife Tina (Leah Hackett) and leaves him.

=== Series 2 (2009) ===
No. overall	No. in series	Title	Directed by	Written by	Original release date	UK viewers (millions)
11	1	"Episode One"	Paul Walker	Steve Hughes	28 September 2009	0.67
Rhys (Andrew Moss), Hannah (Emma Rigby) and Josh Ashworth (Sonny Flood) head off to a music festival. Hannah tells Rhys she has had enough of being the "boring" one of the family and meets Jamie, who she is immediately attracted to. Cindy Cunningham (Stephanie Waring) gets into a fight with Jacqui McQueen (Claire Cooper), who tries to convince Tony Hutchinson (Nick Pickard) not to marry her. Cindy is shocked when her former best friend, Savannah Madeiros (Nicola Stapleton), turns up. Michaela (Hollie-Jay Bowes) and Theresa McQueen (Jorgie Porter) go to a modelling agency in London where Theresa decides to meet her mother Kathleen (Alison Burrows) in prison, however the girls find they do not have enough money to pay for a hotel and they spend the night in public toilets. Lydia Hart (Lydia Kelly) follows Sarah Barnes (Loui Batley), Zoe Carpenter (Zoë Lister), Steph Cunningham (Carley Stenson), Fernando Fernandez (Jeronimo Best) and Gilly Roach (Anthony Quinlan) to an adventure holiday after learning her girlfriend had taken Zoe with her. An argument breaks out and Lydia truly believes Sarah and Zoe are having an affair.
12	2	"Episode Two"	Paul Walker	Steve Hughes	29 September 2009	0.65
Jacqui and Carmel Valentine (Gemma Merna) go to London in search for Theresa and Michaela. They find Theresa at the modelling agency, where Jacqui and the photographer hit it off and trade numbers. Cindy, Savannah, Tony, Dominic Reilly (John Pickard) and Darren Osborne (Ashley Taylor Dawson) go to a spa hotel for Tony's stag and Cindy's hen, where Darren pays a prostitute to seduce a drunken Tony. Meanwhile, Savannah discovers Cindy and Darren's secret relationship and asks her to give her money. Josh is unhappy to find out Kev is a drug dealer and is horrified when both Hannah and Rhys try ecstasy. On the boot camp, Gilly tries to make Fernando look bad in front of Steph as Lydia tells Zoe to stay away from Sarah. She then lies that Sarah tried to kill herself over Zoe.
13	3	"Episode Three"	Mickey Jones	Patrea Smallacombe	30 September 2009	0.60
After Jamie asks Hannah to stay with him, she discovers Imogen is a prostitute and, after trying to leave, is attacked by Kev, who tells her she will be a prostitute against her will. Jacqui goes on her date with Wayne and is drunkenly put into a naked photoshoot as Dom wakes up after his night of passion and discovers Emma is getting married. Theresa goes to visit her mother Kathleen, who is not happy to hear Theresa is living with her cousins. Cindy accuses Darren of intervening in her and Tony's marriage when he fails to show up after the stag night the night before. Meanwhile, Lydia's jealousy becomes increasingly worse. After the girls training with Kingsley for the impending parachute jump, Lydia is angered to overhear a drunken Sarah confess her love to Zoe, who is passed out.
14	4	"Episode Four"	Tracey Rooney	Chris Gill	1 October 2009	0.60
Jacqui tries her best to get back her naked images, however Wayne refuses to give her them. Both Jacqui and Carmel are later arrested. Hannah tries to warn Rhys of Imogen and Kev's true colours, however he finds out Imogen's secret and is beaten up by Blue. Kev and Blue hold Rhys hostage and tell him to get Hannah for them. As they find them, Kev threatens Jamie. Cindy, Savannah and Darren find Tony in a barn. After he admits to sleeping with someone else, Cindy admits to trying to scam him, however Tony tells her he really loves her and wants to marry as she agrees. Zoe is angry to realise Sarah tried to take advantage of her. Lydia begins to cut herself in the woods and tries to convince Sarah that Zoe is trying to split them up, however Zoe and Sarah make up and talk about Lydia as she listens in. Lydia takes drastic action and uses a knife to sabotage a parachute, however she soon realises she has mixed them up. As the girls head into the sky, they jump out, however Sarah's parachute does not deploy and she falls to her death.
15	5	"Episode Five"	Tracey Rooney	Chris Gill	2 October 2009	0.68
In the aftermath of the accident, Mike arrives and is comforted by Zoe. Guilty Lydia makes out to the police that Zoe was jealous of her and Sarah's relationship and plants the knife she used to cut the parachute behind Zoe's bed before slitting her wrists severely. Zoe is then arrested under suspicion of Sarah's murder. Kev holds a gun at Hannah's head and threatens to kill her if Jamie does not give him money, however he lets them go. Rhys leaves for Hollyoaks village and is shortly followed by Hannah who ends her and Jamie's relationship after realising he has not changed. Jacqui and Carmel are released from prison and they set off for Tony and Cindy's wedding. Cindy and Savannah make up and she before the wedding. Jacqui bursts in through the ceremony and asks Tony to tell her he loves Cindy more than her. Tony does not reply but tells her he wants to marry Cindy, which he does. As Zoe settles in a prison cell and Cindy and Tony hold their wedding reception, Mike returns to Hollyoaks and breaks the tragic news to Hannah.

=== Series 4 (2011) ===
No. overall	No. in series	Title	Directed by	Written by	Original release date
16	1	"Episode One"	Tim Hopewell	Neil Jones	25 October 2010
After Nathan and Liam McAllister's (Chris Overton) cage fighting club, Riley (Rob Norbury) and Seth Costello (Miles Higson), joined by their friend Logan, are invited to a party at a footballer's house, where the McAllisters can instigate their plan for revenge. On his way to meet Mark, Jason Costello (Victoria Atkin) is confronted by Fern (Amy Gavin). Jasmine admits her gender dysphoria and is taken aback when Fern tries to kiss her. She flees and is followed by Fern, who threatens to tell Jasmine's family and Bart McQueen (Jonny Clarke). Upset over Malachy Fisher (Glen Wallace) and Lynsey Nolan's (Karen Hassan) relationship, a jealous Mercedes Fisher (Jennifer Metcalfe) cuts her hand and is tended to by Lynsey. Mercedes then tells Lynsey that HIV positive Malachy has infected her. Meanwhile, Mitzeee (Rachel Shenton) teaches Theresa McQueen (Jorgie Porter) and Nancy Hayton (Jessica Fox) how to become a WAG.
17	2	"Episode Two"	Tim Hopewell	Robert Butler and Chris Gill	26 October 2010
Liam and Nathan begin their revenge on the Costello brothers. As Nathan's girlfriend Sami takes a drugged Riley upstairs, Liam gets Seth drunk and drowns him in the jacuzzi. Mitzeee and Chanterelle continue with their mission to bed a footballer as Nancy writes a report on the night. Theresa is entranced by Logan, as he is for her, until Chanterelle takes him to bed. Mercedes sleeps with Jamil Fadel (Sikander Malik) before telling Malachy that she is HIV positive. Meanwhile, Fern continues to threaten Jasmine with a recording of her admitting her secret. Finally at the party, Mitzeee screams as she finds a lifeless Seth lying in the jacuzzi.
18	3	"Episode Three"	John Hardwick	Heather Robson	27 October 2010
Mitzeee resuscitates Seth. Nathan and Liam take Seth and Riley away and tie them up. Sami makes the call to Carl Costello (Paul Opacic), telling him his sons are in trouble. A fed up Nancy is about to call time on her night when she meets Dean, a footballer with a sordid past. A giddy Nancy cannot believe she's pulled, unaware of what's in store for her as Dean invites a few of his mates to join them in the bedroom. Elsewhere, Jasmine tells Bart she's ready to sleep with him and although they finally go all the way this time, Jasmine is repulsed by her body and once again runs off. Confused and upset, Jasmine is at a complete low and cuts her arm with a piece of glass. Malachy is struggling to come to terms with Mercedes being HIV positive. He pleads with Mercedes to talk to him and the pair finally have a heart to heart.
19	4	"Episode Four"	Paul Riordan	Chris Gill	28 October 2010
After Nancy is saved, Nathan and Liam discover Dean has been up to his old tricks, so rid the house of the party guests, as Carl turns up. After tying Carl up, they reveal Riley and Seth in a cage and make them cage fight. However, the Costellos escape with help from Sami. Bart confronts Jason about hitting Fern, but as he does so Fern turns up brandishing a knife. As Fern cuts off Jason's clothes to reveal him as a girl, Bart attacks her and is stabbed. Malachy and Mercedes finally admit they love each other as they discover Bart has been stabbed. Elsewhere, Mitzeee and Theresa are at loggerheads at the party and as the two begin to fight, Theresa's waters break.
20	5	"Episode Five"	Paul Riordan	Neil Jones	29 October 2010
Malachy finally learns the truth from Mercedes; she lied about having HIV. Bart wakes up in hospital and is told by Fern that Jason stabbed him. When Jasmine visits, he tells her he knows she is Jason, and rejects her. Logan is present as Theresa gives birth to Angel McQueen. Carmel Valentine (Gemma Merna) confronts Theresa and tells her she is still going to the police about her killing her husband, Calvin Valentine (Ricky Whittle). Meanwhile, Seth, Riley and Carl are chased by Liam and Nathan, who brings a gun. The events lead to a rooftop argument. Seth tackles Nathan, who falls over the edge. Nathan, only holding onto the scaffolding by one hand, lets go and falls into an oil tank. When Liam drains the oil out, he discovers that his brother has been fatally impaled.

=== Series 5 (2012) ===
No. overall	No. in series	Title	Directed by	Written by	Original release date	UK viewers (millions)
21	1	"Episode One"	Alex Kalymnios	Heather Robson	5 September 2012	0.78
22	2	"Episode Two"	Alex Kalymnios	Heather Robson & Neil Jones	6 September 2012	0.62
23	3	"Episode Three"	Darcia Martin	Neil Jones	7 September 2012	0.74
24	4	"Episode Four"	Alex Kalymnios	Mark Brotherhood	8 September 2012	0.61
25	5	"Episode Five"	Alex Kalymnios	Bede Blake	9 September 2012	0.66

=== Series 6 (2013) ===
No. overall	No. in series	Title	Directed by	Written by	Original release date	UK viewers (millions)
26	1	"Episode One"	Steve Brett	Kevin Rundle	7 October 2013	0.40
27	2	"Episode Two"	Steve Brett	Dan Berlinka	8 October 2013	0.38
28	3	"Episode Three"	Andrew N Gunn	Emma Ko	9 October 2013	0.32
29	4	"Episode Four"	Andrew N Gunn	James Coleman	10 October 2013	0.41
30	5	"Episode Five"	Steve Brett	Richard Burke	11 October 2013	0.36

=== Special (2020) ===
No. overall	Title	Directed by	Written by	Original release date	UK viewers (millions)
31	"2020 Special"	Neil J. Wilkinson	Heather Robson	6 January 2020	1.21
The episode is centred around the demise of serial killer Breda McQueen (Moya Brady) and the arrival of Verity Hutchinson (Eva O'Hara)

=== Special (2025) ===
No. overall	Title	Directed by	Written by	Original release date	UK viewers (millions)
32	"2025 Special"	Sean Glynn	Emily Gascoyne & Phil Redmond	22 October 2025	409k
Following his return to Brookside Close Donny Clark (Louis Emerick), Gemma Johnson (Tisha Merry) and Warren Fox (Jamie Lomas) are held hostage by two armed gunmen demanding £100,000 and Dodger Savage's (Danny Mac) efforts to help a colleague take a harrowing turn. Elsewhere, Theresa McQueen (Jorgie Porter) returns carrying something precious, Frankie Osborne (Isabelle Smith), Lucas Hay (Oscar Curtis), Dillon Ray (Nathaniel Dass), Charlie Dean (Charlie Behan) and Vicky Grant (Anya Lawrence) enjoy their last day in Liverpool by attending a rave and Ste Hay (Kieron Richardson) finds himself in harm's way after attempting to save his son's relationship.
