= Hollyoaks Later series 1 =

Hollyoaks Later
- Season 1
- Hollyoaks Later series 1 opening title
- No. of episodes: 5

Release
- Original network: E4
- Original release: 24 November – 28 November 2008

Series chronology
- Next → Series 2

The first series of Hollyoaks Later (originally Late Night Hollyoaks) is a British television spin-off that ran for one week beginning 24 November 2008. It is a spin-off of the Channel 4 television series Hollyoaks. It was produced by Lucy Allan.

The first series centred on Niall Rafferty's return for revenge on Steph Cunningham, Craig Dean's return, Mercedes Fisher and Malachy Fisher's relationship and wedding, and Sarah Barnes' sexual encounter with Zoe Carpenter.

== Production ==
On 5 June 2008, it was announced that Channel 4 had commissioned the five-part series that began recording in September. It was announced that the plot would involve several groups of characters traveling to different parts of the United Kingdom, with the main storyline being Niall's return, Mercedes and Malachy's wedding, and Sarah and Zoe's lesbian encounter. The series started on 24 November on E4.

It was revealed on 18 September 2008 that The Saturdays would be guest starring in Hollyoaks Later.

== Plot ==
See List of Hollyoaks Later episodes

Craig returns and takes Steph and Tom off to a remote Scottish setting, however Niall is soon following their move and seems contempt on revenge. After kidnapping Tom, Niall realizes Steph does not love him as he does her and ends his life. Kris and Malachy head home to Ireland with their father's ashes and discover a family secret. As Malachy prepares to tell his family of his medical condition, Mercedes heads off after him with Zak and Elliot in tow to tell him she loves him. Sarah, Zoe and Nancy head off on a road trip which leads them to Zoe's old school, where she and Sarah fall out over Zoe's first love - her former teacher. As Ravi seeks forgiveness from Nancy, a drunken Sarah and Zoe show off true feelings and end up sleeping together, only to feel guilty the next day. Dom meets the possible love of his life. Meanwhile, Josh and the Baby Diegos are ecstatic to play at the 'Battle of the Bands' in Liverpool, where the lead members have to come to great decisions about their lives.

== Cast ==
Character	Actor
Craig Dean	Guy Burnet
Steph Cunningham	Carley Stenson
Tom Cunningham	Ellis Hollins
Niall Rafferty	Barry Sloane
Amy Barnes	Ashley Slanina-Davies
Dominic Reilly	John Pickard
Justin Burton	Chris Fountain
Elliot Bevan	Garnon Davies
Josh Ashworth	Sonny Flood
Rhys Ashworth	Andrew Moss
Kris Fisher	Gerard McCarthy
Malachy Fisher	Glen Wallace
Mercedes McQueen	Jennifer Metcalfe
Michaela McQueen	Hollie-Jay Bowes
Nancy Hayton	Jessica Fox
Russ Owen	Stuart Manning
Ravi Roy	Stephen Uppal
Sarah Barnes	Loui Batley
Sasha Valentine	Nathalie Emmanuel
Zak Ramsey	Kent Riley
Zoe Carpenter	Zoë Lister
Loretta Jones	Melissa Walton
Cheryl Brady	Bronagh Waugh
Erin Fisher	Gemma Craven
Lynsey Nolan	Karen Hassan
Pete	Martin McCormick
Sam Jenkins	Martin Fisher
Shane	Patrick Buchanan
Bernadette Fisher	Rachel Heaton
Themselves	The Saturdays

== Ratings ==
Hollyoaks Later	Run time	Original airdate	Viewers (millions)
Episode 1	1 hour	24 November 2008	0.89
Episode 2	1 hour	25 November 2008	0.85
Episode 3	1 hour	26 November 2008	0.78
Episode 4	1 hour	27 November 2008	0.76
Episode 5	1 hour	28 November 2008	0.65
