= Melissa Walton =

British actress

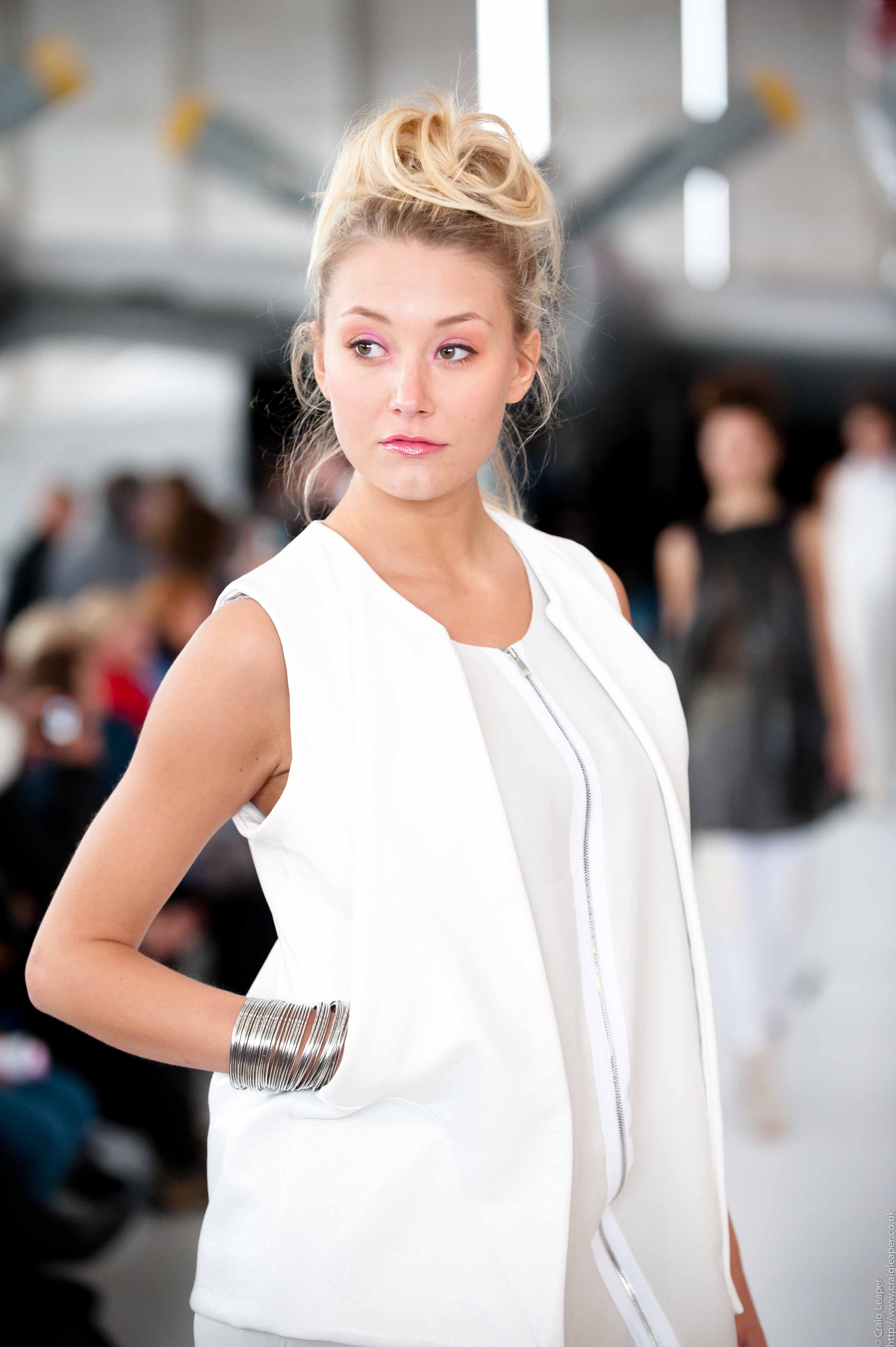
- Born: Melissa Kimberley Walton; Coventry, England
- Occupation: Actress
- Years active: 2008–present

Melissa Wells (formerly Walton) is a British actress best known for playing Loretta Jones in Channel 4 soap opera Hollyoaks.

== Early life ==
Walton studied at Bablake School in Coundon, Coventry, then took a BTEC National Diploma in Performing Arts at Stratford-upon-Avon College, which she passed with three distinctions. As an amateur actress, Walton appeared in pantomime at Belgrade Theatre in Coventry, was a member of the Coventry youth group YOG and attended Three Spires Dance School. While at college, she appeared in the BBC drama Filth alongside actress Julie Walters. Walton completed her diploma in June 2008, and was cast in Hollyoaks that August. Walton initially appeared in the spin-off series Hollyoaks Later on a three-episode basis.

== Career ==
In 2009, it was announced that Hollyoaks' new producer, Lucy Allen, had decided to introduce Walton into the main show. Allan said Walton had impressed her with her performance in Hollyoaks Later. To prepare for the role, Walton took pole-dancing classes and visited a lap dancing club. After watching girls perform at the club, she carried out routines in her underwear. She also had a pole set up in her living room to carry on practicing. Speaking of her research Walton stated: "I loved it. It's really good exercise. It's really good for toning. They didn't ask me to, but I did... I went and I had pole dancing classes. I had a pole put up in my living room."

Walton had initially signed on for a three-month stint. In 2009 Allan decided to renew her contract and keep her with the series until 2010. In early 2010, it was announced that Allan had stepped down from the position of executive producer and that Paul Marquess had taken over the role. It was soon revealed that Marquess planned to give Hollyoaks a "shake up", changing the productions team and beginning a cast cull by axing three established characters. Stephanie Waring (who plays Cindy Hutchinson) then revealed that all remaining cast members feared their character would be axed. One month later, Marquess announced his plans to axe a further 11 characters, including Loretta at the end of Walton's contract. Walton departed alongside co-star Kevin Sacre, who played her on-screen love interest Jake Dean.

On 8 June 2010 Walton filmed her final scenes with the serial along with two fellow cast members, Scare and Gerard McCarthy (who plays Kris Fisher). She spoke of her upset over leaving her fellow cast members, but later said she was looking forward to pursuing other projects. Walton also confirmed that she was happy the door was left open for a potential return, stating she would consider reprising her role as Loretta in the future. Walton also said she understood why Marquess axed her because he didn't feel Loretta had anywhere left to go after her main storyline, in which her character was supposed to be revealed as a child killer, was axed following complaints from Denise Fergus, the mother of murdered child James Bulger. However, she also felt like she did deserve another chance to prove herself.
