= Jake Dean =

UK soap opera character (created 2002)

- Hollyoaks character
- Portrayed by: Kevin Sacre
- Duration: 2002–2010
- First appearance: 5 November 2002
- Last appearance: 6 August 2010
- Introduced by: Jo Hallows (2002); Lucy Allan (2009)
In-universe information
- Family: Dean
- Father: Johnno Dean
- Mother: Frankie Osborne
- Stepfather: Jack Osborne
- Stepmother: Michelle Dean
- Brothers: Craig Dean
- Sisters: Debbie Dean; Steph Dean
- Half-brothers: Presley Dean; Brian Bloom
- Wife: Becca Hayton (2005–2007); Nancy Hayton (2008–2009)
- Stepsons: Charlie Dean
- Aunts: Linda Wallace
- Nieces: Esther Bloom
- Other relatives: Irene Wallace

Jake Dean is a fictional character from the British Channel 4 soap opera Hollyoaks, played by Kevin Sacre. Sacre portrayed the character between 2002 and 2008, before making a return on 5 October 2009. In March 2010, Sacre was axed from the series by Paul Marquess during his major revamp and cast cull. Jake made his last appearance on 6 August 2010.

== Creation ==
In late-mid 2002, it was announced that regular character Steph Dean's family would appear on the series. Max Brown who secured the role of Kristian Hargreaves, originally auditioned for the role of Jake. However actor Kevin Sacre was the successful applicant. Jake and his onscreen brother Craig Dean (Guy Burnet) were introduced as two of four new male characters introduced in late 2002.

In early 2010 it was announced that Lucy Allan had stepped down from the position of executive producer, Paul Marquess then took over the role. It was soon revealed that he planned revamp Hollyoaks, changing the productions team, then began a cast cull starting with the axing of three established characters. Stephanie Waring (who plays Cindy Hutchinson) then revealed that all remaining cast members feared their characters would be next to depart from the series, stating that there was a general feeling on unease. One month later the cast cull continued as Marquess announced his plans to axe a further 11 characters, during this it was revealed that Jake would leave the Hollyoaks once more at the end of Scare's current contract. He is set to finish filming in early 2010 and depart on-screen after the conclusion of a story about his unbalanced love-interest Loretta Jones (Melissa Walton).

== Development ==
The first signs of Jake's nasty personality started after discovering wife Becca Dean (Ali Bastian) had been having an affair with former school pupil Justin Burton (Chris Fountain). Becoming aggressive and manipulative, Jake beat up Justin several times and, on one occasion, physically attacked pregnant Becca. After being rushed to hospital, Charlie was diagnosed with leukaemia. Jake offered himself as a donor, being Charlie's father, however doctors informed Jake and Nancy that Jake was not Charlie's biological father, and therefore must have been conceived during Becca's affair with Justin. Jake was furious but refused to admit Justin was Charlie's father. Jake grew more out of hand and even more controlling of Nancy. On their wedding night, Jake wanted to have sex with her, however she did not. Steph entered the flat, stopping Jake before he got out of hand and raped her. Nancy and Jake split up and she told him she was filing for full custody of Charlie. Jake began a vendetta against her in order to make her look bad. Jake ended up kidnapping Charlie and attempted to kill himself and Charlie.

Domestic abuse charity Tender praised the soap opera's portrayal of Jake attempting to rape Nancy. A survey conducted by the group found that 96% of participants thought the scenes were effective in bringing the issue to viewers' attention. Discussing the reasons behind the attempted rape, 68% thought Jake craved control, while 30% put his actions down to mental instability and 1% blamed abuse suffered when he was young. The poll also revealed that 54% of respondents thought Jake should receive counselling and 45% felt he should serve time in prison. Tender stated, "As a national platform, Hollyoaks played a vital role in educating the public about the issue of abusive relationships."

On 11 April 2008, Kevin Sacre announced his departure on the Hollyoaks website, and confirming he has filmed his final scenes. When quizzed over his decision, Sacre said, "I have been here since I was 24 and I turned 30 in March. I decided that once I turned 30 I'd go and explore other avenues. We have a lot of good actors on the show and it's good to see them go on to do great things because people are always saying that Hollyoaks actors are rubbish, which is so unfair and untrue. I'd love to go and do something and people say 'oh look there's Kev, he's doing well and he's one of our lot."

In July 2009, it was reported by entertainment website Digital Spy that Kevin Sacre had agreed to return to Hollyoaks briefly later on in the year. The Channel 4 official website confirmed the characters return in October. On the character's arrival, he appeared to have changed and his mental health had improved greatly. This led to the announcement of his release.

== Storylines ==
=== 2002–2008 ===
Jake arrives in Hollyoaks with his family. The eldest of the Dean family, Jake soon begins a short relationship with Jodie Nash. His family hit money issues and Jake finds himself bailing them out. The family goes into a disaster. Steph is attacked by serial killer Toby Mills and Johnno's workplace collapses. After gruelling debts begin to pile up, the Deans are forced to move out of their home. Jake is left with no option but to take a mortgage out on their home. Johnno and Frankie's marriage then collapses, and Johnno leaves Hollyoaks with his new girlfriend Michelle.

After Ben Davies's wedding to Izzy Cornwell, Jake shares a kiss with Becca Hayton. Jake pursues Becca and is delighted when she becomes his girlfriend. The pair’s relationship seems ideal and everything just seems to go from strength to strength until Jake's friend Dan Hunter is killed during a rally car race. Jake begins comforting Dan's sister Lisa, and an affair soon begins. Jake decides to end it but ends up sleeping with her. Jake then ends the affair and decides to propose to Becca. However, he ends up confessing his and Lisa's affair. Becca splits up with Jake, who tries for months to get her to take him back. Finally, Becca takes him back and the pair get engaged. They then marry in a double wedding, with Frankie also marrying Jack Osborne. Becca’s younger sister Nancy moves in with the newly-weds. Jake tells Becca, who is not sure, he wants to try for a baby. Becca tells Jake she is pregnant. Shortly after, Jake discovers Becca is having an affair with Justin Burton. Becca tells a devastated Jake she is not sure over their baby's paternity. Jake attacks Becca before beating up Justin, which gets him arrested.

Jake moves out and into The Dog. Jake's life begins to slowly rebuild itself. However, tragedy strikes when he accidentally runs over and kills Diane Valentine. Frightened, Jake drives off and leaves Diane lying on the road. After confiding in family, Jake hands himself into the police, where he is charged with his offence. Instead of a long prison sentence, Jake is given a two-year probation, driving a wedge between the Dean and the Valentine families. During a fire at The Dog, in which Jake is trapped, Diane's son Calvin puts what Jake did aside and saves him. After Justin and Becca's relationship breaks down, Becca is arrested after Justin tells police she slept with him when he was only 15. Jake kidnaps Justin and threatens him, not wanting his unborn child to be brought up in prison; however, Justin ends up testifying and Becca is sent to prison, where she gives birth to a boy called Charlie. Becca lets Charlie go home to Jake instead of growing up in prison. After a confrontation about Charlie's paternity, Jake agrees to take a DNA test to prove he is Charlie's father. After receiving the results, Jake feels he cannot open them and, instead, tells his family he is the father. Tragically, Becca is stabbed in prison, and in the hospital, she tells him that she loves Jake more than Justin, and then she dies.

Jake and Nancy are united in grief over Becca's murder. The pair start to realise feelings for one another and they almost share a kiss. Craig, who is Nancy's friend, finds out about Jake and Nancy's feelings and is angry. Nancy and Jake then sleep together. Nancy believes her and Jake's night of passion is just a one-night stand after awaking to find Jake gone; however, the pair finally begin a full relationship. Justin admits to having lied about Becca sleeping with him when he was under-age. This makes Nancy feel guilty and she ends the relationship. Jake finally wins Nancy back after declaring his love for her in public. Nancy then takes him back. The couple's relationship is accepted by their friends Tony Hutchinson, Carmel McQueen, Darren Osborne and Zoe Carpenter. However, Nancy's mother Margaret is less than pleased. At Craig and Sarah Barnes' engagement party, Frankie finally starts to accept Jake and Nancy's relationship after realising she has upset Jake. After Craig's sexuality is revealed, Jake finds it hard to accept his brother is gay. When Craig and John Paul McQueen prepare to leave for Dublin, Jake stops him and tells him he will never understand, but cannot let him go without saying goodbye as they are still brothers.

Gilly Roach accuses lifeguard Simon Crosby of being a paedophile. Jake, being a father himself, is disgusted. Jake and Gilly rally a large crowd outside Simon's house to push him away. The crowd begins throwing bricks through the windows. Max Cunningham, Sam "O.B." O'Brien and Simon's wife Gemma arrive and proclaim Simon's innocence. Max and Jake end up fighting. As the police arrive, Simon attempts suicide.

Jake grows ever jealous of Nancy and her college friends. When Nancy begins tutoring Jake's foster brother Barry Newton, he becomes even more jealous and suspects an affair. Jake calls the police and Nancy is questioned over the allegations of a sexual relationship between herself and Newt. Nancy is released when Newt explains there was no affair. Jake dumps Nancy and leaves her. Jake needing to control Nancy, breaking into her house one night, and bursts a water pipe. Nancy then has no option but to phone Jake. Jake takes her back and forces her to wear conservative clothes and stop dyeing her hair different colours. Jake then proposes to her, using Becca's engagement ring.

Charlie is rushed to hospital and is revealed to have an acute form of leukaemia. Nancy and Jake plead with doctors to run tests to see if either of them is eligible to donate their bone marrow to Charlie. Jake is then told his tests were negative, as he is not Charlie's biological father. Nancy then pleads with Justin to help Charlie as he is his real father. Jake holds his and Nancy's wedding on Valentine's Day, the anniversary of Becca's death. Russ Owen, Jake's best man, questions the date and an angry Jake throws him out of his flat. On their wedding night, Jake comes on to Nancy and tries to make love to her; however, Nancy pushes him off as she is drunk. Jake does not take no for an answer and pushes himself on top of her. Steph lets herself in and catches Nancy screaming with Jake on top of her, preventing him from raping her. Jake denies attempted rape to a hurt Nancy. When she tells him she is leaving, Jake manipulates her, but she does not fall for it. Nancy is then horrified when Jake then cancels Nancy's visiting rights to Charlie. to which she Nancy tells him she will go to the police.

Nancy asks Justin for help to get full custody of Charlie, but Justin refuses. Jake receives a letter from Nancy's solicitor outlining her fight for custody of Charlie. Jake later verbally attacks Nancy in the street, telling her she will never get custody now she has gone back to her old image. Justin overhears how nasty Jake is being and agrees to help her fight for custody. Jake kidnaps Charlie, realising he will most likely lose custody. He attempts suicide by gassing himself and Charlie in his car. Nancy manages to save Charlie, but leaves Jake to die. Nancy calls an ambulance for Charlie, but is interrupted by Jake, who tries to take Charlie away from her. Jake returns and manipulates Frankie into giving him enough money to run away to France. He tells her he plans to take Charlie with him and put him in hospital when they are in France. The police arrive as Jake is about to leave and they arrest him. Jake is sectioned and detained in a mental hospital. Frankie protests Jake's innocence, but Steph explains she caught him attempting to rape Nancy. Darren and Warren Fox come up with an idea to have Jake confess to the murder of Sean Kennedy, thus freeing Sean's wife, Warren's fiancée, Louise Summers. Warren gets Darren to tell Jake he will give Jack money to pay off his debts and to get Justin to agree to stay away from Charlie and help Frankie get custody. Jake agrees. Jake then tells Frankie not to visit him.

A year after he was sectioned and charged with Sean's murder, Calvin Valentine manages to get Warren to admit that he was the one who actually killed Sean and then got Jake to take the blame. Calvin tells Frankie that Warren had framed Jake and that Darren had helped cover it up. Frankie urges Darren to confess. However, he does not.

=== 2009–2010 ===
In October Jake appears in the mental home he was sectioned in. Jake tells Frankie he wishes to see Steph, whom he has not seen since his sectioning, however Steph refuses, still angry at him and also upset over her friend Sarah Barnes' death. Jake, clearly having recovered from his breakdown, is told by his doctor that he thinks he is well enough to be released. Nancy is phoned and told about Jake's upcoming release. She visits him and tells him she does not want him to be released, Jake then tells her he feels the same. Jake is released from the hospital and put on bail from prison for attempted murder until November. Nancy struggles to accept Jake being back and is shocked when he reveals Hannah Ashworth had sent him letters. However, Nancy's friend and flatmate Loretta Jones (Melissa Walton) admits to Jake that Hannah only sent one letter and she sent the others. Jake and Loretta grow closer, however Jake is skeptical of her actions when she takes Charlie to meet him, despite him already receiving a warning for interacting with him. Jake is taken back to the police station to hear about his trial. When there, DS Murtaugh informs Jake that the charges against him had been dropped due to his mental health. Overjoyed, Jake meets with Loretta, where they kiss before she leaves.

After continuing his friendship with Malachy Fisher, Jake ends up getting a job as a bouncer at The Loft. Jake and Loretta begin a secret relationship. After Charlie goes missing, Loretta suspects Jake. Nancy and Jake begin an argument, resulting in Loretta admitting the truth about their secret relationship. Later, Anita Roy and Ricky Campbell find Charlie in a shed. Loretta moves in with Jake. However, Steph tells her they are moving too fast. Loretta ends it with Jake, who overreacts. The pair later get back together with the help of Steph.

Later, Jake goes missing. It is later revealed that he's been kidnapped by his old nurse Caroline. He confronts her when she takes him hostage along with Loretta in the hospital with a syringe, but seconds before the police arrives; a struggle ensues and Caroline is stabbed by the needle. Jake tries to make amends with Loretta and apologises, but she dumps him for the fact that he cheated on her.

Loretta returns for Jake during Calvin's wedding they get back together however it is clear to Jake that something is not right, as Loretta becomes jealous of other women and constantly criticises Jake's appearance. Jake follows Loretta when she goes to see a house but is shocked to find her arguing with her ex-boyfriend, Adam. Initially Jake takes Loretta's side but when Adam shows him an injunction he had taken out on Loretta, Jake begins to doubt her. When Steph finds out she has cervical cancer, Jake starts to help out with his sister which causes a lot of jealousy with Loretta. Loretta tells Jake she once suffered from leukemia in order to gain attention but when he finds out shes lying he kicks her out.

Loretta manages to convince Steph and Frankie that Jake has been threatening her and she is afraid of him. Jake feels he has no choice but to stay with Loretta or his family will have him sectioned again. He confides in Nancy, who privately meets Adam to confirm Jake's story. When Nancy is alone, Loretta confronts her and Nancy is accidentally injured. Jake shows up and Loretta holds Nancy hostage before revealing that she had been sexually abused as a child and no one had believed her. Loretta is taken to get psychiatric help, and Jake and Nancy decide to stay quiet about her crimes. Frankie still believes that Jake was a threat to Loretta, and Jake keeps quiet as he is hurt at his family not believing him, but Nancy tells Frankie the truth, prompting her to reconcile with her son.

Jake hears that Kris Fisher and Zak Ramsey are going to London to help Zoe Carpenter organise a rich person's birthday party and he shows an interest in going with them, but Kris says it wouldn't be his sort of thing. Disappointed, Jake speaks to Steph about leaving. At first, he fears she's trying to get rid of him, but she merely wants him to be happy and she believes he would be better off, going somewhere new and starting again. Zak and Kris meet at the Loft, with the bags they're taking with them to London, when Steph and Jake manage to find them. Steph manages to convince Kris that Jake can go with them, and the trio board a bus, heading for London.

Following Frankie's death in 2017, Jake's niece Esther contacted him, Debbie and Craig to break the news. She later explained that Jake and Debbie intended to attend the funeral but missed their flights.

== Reception ==
Ruth Deller of entertainment website Lowculture criticised Jake's 2009 return branding it as unsuccessful, also stating: "Sometimes a returning character can bring a much needed shot in the arm to a soap [...] but that’s because those characters were liked in the first place. [...] So far, the only point of Jake’s return has seemed to be to show us that being in a psychiatric ward isn’t the permanent sentence Hollyoaks would have previously had us believe." For the show's portrayal of Jake and Becca's relationship, they were nominated for "Best Couple" at the 2004 Inside Soap Awards.
