= Cheryl Brady =

Fictional character from Hollyoaks

- Hollyoaks character
- Portrayed by: Bronagh Waugh
- Duration: 2008–2013
- First appearance: 24 November 2008
- Last appearance: 22 March 2013
- Introduced by: Lucy Allan
- Spin-off appearances: Hollyoaks Later (2008, 2010, 2012); Hollyoaks: King of Hearts (2010)
In-universe information
- Occupation: Barmaid (2009–2013); Waitress (2009–2010); Club owner (2010–2013); Student (2012–2013)
- Father: Seamus Brady
- Half-brothers: Brendan Brady
- Grandmothers: Flo Brady
- Nephews: Declan Brady; Padraig Brady
- Nieces: Niamh Brady

Cheryl Brady is a fictional character from the British Channel 4 soap opera Hollyoaks, played by Bronagh Waugh. The character first appeared on-screen on 24 November 2008, during the first series of the Hollyoaks spin-off Hollyoaks Later, as the former love interest of Malachy Fisher. She made her first appearance in main Hollyoaks episodes in July 2009, introduced to the serial by series producer, Lucy Allan. In 2010 when Paul Marquess began producing the serial, he felt that Cheryl was being used in the wrong way, subsequently making her a central character to the show. It was announced on 1 February 2013 that Waugh quit her role. Cheryl departed Hollyoaks on 22 March 2013, after four years on the show, along with her brother, Brendan Brady.

== Character creation ==
=== Background ===
The character of Cheryl was created to help correctly show a cross-section of young people in British society. Cheryl was given immediate links to Malachy Fisher (Glen Wallace), being his ex-girlfriend and Kris Fisher (Gerard McCarthy) who also knew her from his time living in Belfast. When Cheryl was introduced to the main cast she had already established links with character Zak Ramsey (Kent Riley), who she had previously shared a fling with. Series producer Lucy Allan also stated she had big plans for the character. Bronagh Waugh and Ricky Whittle (Calvin Valentine) discussed why they believed the character was introduced into the main series stating: "I think they brought me in to lighten it [Hollyoaks] up." and "They have brought Cheryl in to introduce a bit of comedy, a bit more fun."

=== Casting ===
Actress Bronagh Waugh received a call to audition for the part of Cheryl in 2008. At first Waugh thought it was a mistake because she did not see herself fitting in with the typical stereotype of the female cast. Waugh went on to get the part, which was initially a short term stint in spin-off series, Hollyoaks Later. After Waugh had impressed series producer Lucy Allan, Waugh was called back and offered a one-year contract to appear in the main series. On hearing the news Waugh jumped up and down screaming, claiming she didn't think she would get the call back. Initially the casting department were looking for an actress that weighed far more, but couldn't find anyone and decided to find someone of normal size with curves. Of the part she said: "I think it's good to see someone with flaws. I feel an enormous responsibility to younger viewers who may be watching and going 'oh my God, the girls in Hollyoaks are so skinny and gorgeous' and I really want to stand up for ordinary girls." Waugh also credited actor Gerard McCarthy who plays Kris Fisher in the series for helping her secure the role.

In January 2010, Waugh announced she was staying with Hollyoaks until at least April 2011 after signing an 18-month contract. Speaking to PA, Waugh explained: "It is quite long actually. Most people are six months or a year. But I'm glad they've let me know longer term because at least you're not going 'Should I look for another job?'. I can really put my head down and concentrate and enjoy the next couple of years." She also admitted she was "happy" to stick with the show for another two years, but believes it will be "time to go" after that. She continued: "It's such a big character that I wouldn't want to get pigeon-holed in just that type of thing."

== Development ==
=== Characterisation ===
Cheryl has an outlandish personality, she is loud and a larger than life character, speaking on in conjunction with this series producer Lucy Allan made a comment stating "You can't have anything but big with Cheryl, can you?" Waugh has also compared her to a popular cartoon character stating: "She's like the Tasmanian devil, just a whirlwind hurricane leaving carnage in her wake and then totters off as if that's completely normal and goes and buys a loaf of bread." She has also spoke about her character's softer side stating: "She's like a bulldozer, she just storms in and goes nuts, and she's a real maneater. But at the same time what I love is that they let me show her vulnerability. If you're a big two-dimensional comedy character, it's good fun for a couple of weeks but then that's it. I think someone who's as brash and brazen as her needs to show a flip-side, there's a reason why she acts the way she does and we get to see that too." The official E4 publicity describes her as 'the bubbly tart with a heart' and states that she spells out trouble for the males and causes a ruckus for the females. During an interview on loose Women Waugh spoke about her character stating: "I play the maneater of the village that tries to get them all but it doesn't really work."

Cheryl is often seen in many outlandish outfits consisting of hot pants and items of many bright colours. Waugh was stated that she doesn't mind the outfits because they remain true to her larger-than-life personality. She also said that Cheryl has a lot of confidence in order to dress the way she does.

=== Malachy Fisher ===
Cheryl's only long-term relationship with a fellow character was with Malachy Fisher (Glen Wallace), their relationship happened off-screen. The characters have often been shown recalling how good they were together, although it was Malachy who left her. She has shown a keen interest in a strew on male characters since her first appearance but always seems to be unlucky in love. Speaking of Malachy and other men Waugh spoke about their special connection saying:"I think Cheryl is kinda after everyone, she'll be eternally after Malachy he'll always hold a very special place in his heart for her, shes after a lot of other boys, but I think there will always be a connection between Malachy and Cheryl throughout all the time they stay on the show." She was later paired with the character Gilly Roach (Anthony Quinlan) for a few months, but their relationship was ruined after Cheryl found out he was actually in love with Steph Cunningham (Carley Stenson).

=== Departure ===
On 1 February 2013, it was announced that Waugh had decided to leave Hollyoaks. Her last scenes as Cheryl aired in March and will see her depart during the same week as Emmett Scanlan, who plays Cheryl's brother Brendan. Of her decision to leave, Waugh stated "Deciding to leave Hollyoaks was tough - I have had the most incredible four years on the show and the cast and crew really are like my family - but it just feels like the right time for me and for Cheryl." Waugh revealed that she was keen to pursue new acting role in Ireland and the UK. Digital Spy's Daniel Kilkelly reported that Cheryl and Brendan's departures will occur during an "explosive week" of Hollyoaks. Cheryl leaves with her boyfriend Nate to start married life.

== Storylines ==
Cheryl first appeared in Hollyoaks Later when Malachy and Kris returned home for their father's funeral. She then continually clashed with Malachy's fiancée Mercedes McQueen (Jennifer Metcalfe). She eventually convinced Malachy to go ahead with the wedding despite her still present feelings for him. She had a brief fling at this time with Zak, but she appeared too keen on him and scared him off.

She first appeared in the Hollyoaks village in the back of a taxi and visited Malachy at the McQueen's, claiming she was looking for Zak Ramsey, whom she had shared a kiss with. On learning Zak was attending the funeral of Warren Fox (Jamie Lomas), she and Malachy went to find him. Michaela McQueen (Hollie-Jay Bowes) displayed her dislike for Cheryl and was jealous. Sasha Valentine (Nathalie Emmanuel) ordered a noisy Cheryl to leave the church and, on her exit, she walked into Mercedes. The pair ended up in a fight and were restrained by Calvin and Malachy. Cheryl revealed to Malachy and Kris that the reason she is in Hollyoaks village was because a man had died whilst having sex with her and she was scared the police might arrest her, however Kris later informed her that the police were not looking for her. Steph gave Cheryl a job at MOBs and she moved into the Halls. Cheryl began looking after Spencer Gray (Darren John Langford) in an attempt to get closer to Calvin, but showed genuine guilt when she allowed Calvin to refer Spencer to a care home as he couldn't cope with him. Cheryl moved in with the Valentines when she got kicked out of halls and struck up friendship with Leo Valentine (Brian Bovell). Cheryl remained living with the family, despite Calvin's reluctance, until Sasha returned and demanded Cheryl move out. Leo and Calvin ask Cheryl to leave, but she eventually proved herself by persuading Malachy and Mercedes not to sue Spencer for Malchy's accident on the building site.

In order to make Calvin jealous Cheryl kissed Gilly, who was trying to make Steph jealous. However, things do not go to plan when his false tooth falls out in her mouth. Cheryl began to realise she had feelings for Gilly. When Calvin insulted him, she told him she loves him, and is not using him. Cheryl sees Gilly holding an engagement ring, which Fernando Fernandez (Jeronimo Best) plans to give to Steph. Cheryl immediately assumes Gilly is planning to propose and announces their engagement. Gilly is horrified to find himself engaged and tries to act like a slob to put Cheryl off of marrying him. However, this does not work. When Gilly accuses her of having an affair with Rhys Ashworth (Andrew Moss), she dumps him. Gilly realises he does love Cheryl so he proposes for real, which she accepts. Cheryl finds out Gilly has feelings for Steph and she ends their relationship.

Gilly goes travelling however cuts his holiday short when he meets Jem and gets engaged again which upsets Cheryl. When Calvin is shot dead by Theresa McQueen (Jorgie Porter) at his wedding with Carmel Valentine (Gemma Merna), Cheryl tells a grieving Carmel that Calvin had been having an affair with Carmel's sister Mercedes. Cheryl later tells the police that she believes Mercedes is involved in Calvin's death, Malachy tells the police it was him. Cheryl wins £250,000 on the lottery. After her lottery win Cheryl's brother Brendan Brady (Emmett J. Scanlan) turns up and convinces her to buy The Loft, which she renames "Chez Chez". Cheryl's best friend Lynsey also arrives in the village.

Cheryl's old friend, Lynsey Nolan (Karen Hassan), turns up, and Cheryl is delighted to see her. Cheryl informs her she fancies Malachy, and Lynsey is too afraid to admit she does too. Malachy also fancies Lynsey, so in an attempt to not hurt Cheryl's feelings, the pair agree to keep their affair private. Cheryl sets employees Rhys and Jacqui up on a date, convinced they're in love and hoping to create a new relationship.

Cheryl's brother Brendan gets up to bad business in Hollyoaks, dealing with drugs to raise money and often stealing from Cheryl. However, Cheryl is completely unaware of his dodgy side and thinks Brendan is an "angel". Cheryl get mugged accidentally by Brendan who didn't think it was her. Malachy tells Cheryl that her brother was the one who attacked him - however Cheryl is repulsed at how he could think that, and fires him and throws him out of the house. After emerging from hospital, Cheryl finally meets her "silent partner" Danny Houston (Darren Day). However, she is unimpressed and picks up that he is dodgy, and realises this is not the guy she wants to share her business with. She also discovers Rhys and Jacqui are no longer an item, and is not happy. Cheryl is heartbroken when she finds out Lynsey and Malachy are seeing each other behind her back. Cheryl also struggles to cope with Steph dying of cancer.

Cheryl and Lynsey make up when Malachy gets back with Mercedes during a night out they come back to find the village destroyed, Malachy in hospital and Steph dead, leaving Cheryl devastated. Mercedes and Cheryl end their ongoing feud when Mercedes comforts her over Steph's death. When Malachy's condition deteriorates she seeks support from Brendan. Rae Wilson (Alice Barlow) tells Cheryl that Brendan's gay but Cheryl brushes off her claims unaware that her brother is sleeping with Ste Hay (Kieron Richardson) and beating him up. When Mercedes makes the decision to turn off Malachy's life support machine Cheryl says a tearful goodbye to him telling him he is the love of her life.

Cheryl slept with Trev Costello (Scott Neal), who she believes is homosexual but finds out that he has a wife. Cheryl sleeps with Rhys in Hollyoaks: King of Hearts after Rhys believes that Jacqui McQueen (Claire Cooper) is sleeping with Danny. It is discovered that Warren is Cheryl's boyfriend. As the clock struck midnight for 2011 Cheryl and Trevor kiss however Trevor tells Cheryl that he has too much respect for her. Cheryl finds Warren in the same episode and kisses him. There was a robbery attempt in The Dog in the Pond which Cheryl discovered was staged by Warren to make people not hate him.

Cheryl is angry when she discovers Brendan's sexuality, also feeling hurt she was one of the last people to know. Cheryl is invited to The Royal Wedding she is determined to lose weight and asks Lynsey for slimming pills. She is unaware that Silas Blissett (Jeff Rawle), has swapped the slimming pills for sedatives and she ends up in hospital. Brendan returns and buys Cheryl's share of Chez Chez. Cheryl feuds with Cindy Longford (Stephanie Waring) and later forgives Brendan.

Cheryl feels especially guilty when Lynsey's claims that Silas is actually a serial killer, having murdered India Longford (Beth Kingston), Rae Wilson, Rebecca Massey (Daisy Turner), are true and that Silas has been charged with the killings. Silas' evil side is discovered when he accidentally murdered his daughter Heidi Costello (Kim Tiddy), intending to kill Lynsey instead, who was wearing the same costume as them on Halloween. Cheryl resents herself as she threw the party at Chez Chez that Heidi attended, before leaving and being mistaken for Lynsey by Silas, and strangled. Lynsey rejects Cheryl's constant apologises, saying that she was her best friend, and she wasn't there when she needed her. Cheryl is glad that, now Silas has been proved to be the killer, it proves that Brendan is innocent and can return home from prison. Cheryl enrolls herself into a Business Management Course in HCC, hoping to turn over a new leaf in 2012.

Cheryl and Lynsey become best friends again and they plan a holiday together in Spain. While Cheryl is out getting alcohol to celebrate their plans, Lynsey is found strangled by Brendan, who then carries her out to the village and Cheryl breaks down over Lynsey's body, apologising for not being there to defend her. In the aftermath of Lynsey's murder, Cheryl and Brendan briefly live with Mercedes and Riley Costello (Rob Norbury). The police ask Cheryl to check Lynsey's jewellery to determine if there could be a link with the village serial killer Silas, who previously attacked Lynsey a year prior. Cheryl also forms a close friendship with Annalise Appleton (Tamaryn Payne) who helps her get over Lynsey's death further. In the fifth series of Hollyoaks Later her and Brendan visit their dying grandmother where Brendan and Joel presume they have killed Joel's abusive step-father Mick unaware Walker found him and suffocated him to frame Brendan. Cheryl is horrified to see Brendan cutting up Micks body and she is furious but eventually convinces Brendan for the pair to go to a family counselling session to get through their problems. Cheryl convinces Doug Carter (PJ Brennan) to advise Ste him and Brendan belong together and he leaves for America while Ste and Brendan unite, delighting Cheryl. Brendan and Cheryl's father Seamus Brady (Fintan McKeown) arrives in Hollyoaks but Cheryl is unaware of his sexual abuse to Brendan as a child and Is desperate for the family to bond and build bridges. Cheryl later shoots and kills Seamus after finding out he sexually abused Brendan as a child through a video recorded and left by Simon Walker (Neil Newbon) before being killed by Brendan. After Brendan takes the blame for Seamus' death, Cheryl moves to Ireland to start a new life with fiancé Nate but not before confessing she is Seamus' real killer to Ste.

== Reception ==
Bronagh Waugh was nominated for 'Best Newcomer' at the 2010 National Television Awards. Speaking of her nomination in 2010, Waugh said: "It's just such an honour. I've only been here on screen for six months so for the first recognition to be the National Television Awards? That's the icing on the cake – it just couldn't get any better than that. I'm so honoured to be shortlisted and it's a lovely achievement. I'm just going to wee myself with excitement when I'm seeing all those exciting people!" Despite her nomination, Waugh lost the award to Coronation Street's Craig Gazey for his portrayal of Graeme Proctor. In 2010, Waugh was nominated in the category of "Funniest Performance". She later received a "Best Actress" nomination at the 2012 TV Choice Awards. At the 2013 National Television Awards Waugh was nominated in the category of "Serial Drama Performance". Daniel Kilkelly of Digital Spy commented on the character saying she has become known to the public because of her larger-than-life antics and man-hungry ways since making her debut as a regular.
