= Summer Shaw =

UK soap opera character, created 2007

- Hollyoaks character
- Portrayed by: Summer Strallen
- Duration: 2007–2008
- First appearance: 2 October 2007
- Last appearance: 27 February 2008

Summer Shaw is a fictional character from the British Channel 4 soap opera Hollyoaks, played by Summer Strallen. The character is most notable for being "planted" in the show as publicity for an Andrew Lloyd Webber produced stage production of The Sound of Music. Making national headlines, Summer the fictional character won the same leading role of Maria that Strallen had been cast as in the West End show.

== Casting ==
Summer Strallen was cast as Summer and played the character from 2007 to 2008. Strallen found it "fun" being based in Liverpool whilst filming on the soap, and she became good friends with her co-star Loui Batley whilst on the soap. Strallen revealed that being on the soap helped her learn a lot "about working with a camera".

== Storylines ==
Summer, who arrives as an undergraduate at Hollyoaks Community College, has moved to Chester and seems to have an interfering mother constantly phoning her to check if she is okay. John Paul and Katy spot her conversing with her mother on the phone and realise a pair of underwear has dropped from her suitcase as she gathers her bags and walks off to find the admissions office. John Paul screams for her but she does not hear him. Later, while dining at Il Gnosh the two spot her again where John Paul timidly returns the pair of underwear to her and introduces himself. The two strike up a friendship and while walking through the college, she talks lots about herself and her passion for the performing arts. John Paul invites her for a drink, with Katy not joining them, probably as she finds her a bit full on. While John Paul strikes up a conversation with Jay, Summer befriends Russ while sitting at the bar.

While attending John Paul's housewarming party at the halls, Summer catches the eye of Kris Fisher. The carbon monoxide leak from the faulty boiler renders her unconscious along with all the other people in the party. Summer is drowsy but recovers at the scene, she is given the all clear by doctors and told to go home. At a swimming pool in which O.B. had taken Tom to teach him how to swim O.B. sees Summer and starts chatting her up. He is so busy talking to her that he does not notice Tom taking his armbands off before jumping in and having to be saved by Simon Crosby. Summer then starts working at MOBs where it is obvious that O.B. has a crush on her and she clashes with Max Cunningham's girlfriend Steph Dean who she works with and originally meets after they both go for a part to star in a health and safety video.

After running into Nancy Hayton and Sarah Barnes, the trio decide to go for a drink. When a guy walks into the SU Bar, when Sarah says "Ooh, I'd have a bit of that!", where Nancy replies "No, he's not my type", before Summer noticed him, and calls out "James!" Nancy and Sarah both look horrified by what they said.

James, Summer's long-term boyfriend, is in the Army and tells Summer he's on leave because he is to spend five months in Afghanistan - and he leaves the next day. Summer considers asking him to stay, before a heart-to-heart with Sarah, who asks her "what if you landed a part in a Broadway show?" "I'd ask him to come with me" "For him to drop everything to follow your dreams, when you wouldn't let him follow his?" Summer understands that she couldn't have it all her way, and let him go, after telling him "if you get yourself killed out there I'll murder you!" "You say that every time!" The pair kiss, and James left in a taxi.

On the 15 November 2007 Summer receives a phone call from James. After the credits ends, she cries and rells O.B. that it was over between her and James. She runs off leaving O.B. alone at The Dog in The Pond.

Summer later shares a kiss with Kris Fisher after their radio show was taken over by 'pirates' aka John Paul McQueen and Elliot Bevan. But then it is revealed that they are a couple when she tells OB "I never would have thought I would have a boyfriend who looked better than me in lipgloss."

However, after realising her feelings for OB, she breaks up with Kris claiming he is too high maintenance. This results in quite a nasty argument between them - Kris calling Summer shallow while Summer stated that cross-dressing didn't make him any more special, and that he 'wakes up in the morning and thinks, who shall I be today, male or female?' Later Kris sees Summer having lunch with OB and is angry, but when OB defends her Kris and OB 'fight', ending in Summer pouring water over them.

On 25 January 2008, after Steph suggested that they should form a band, Summer decided she'd had enough of life in Hollyoaks and wanted to try her luck at living in London. She wanted to be able to chase her dreams and not wait for the opportunities to come to her. She asked O.B. to go with her but he refused saying that he couldn't let Max down by leaving. After one last-ditch attempt to convince O.B. to come with her, she walked out the door.

Later, Max convinces O.B. to leave with Summer, saying that she is the best thing that's ever happened to him. They race to the bus station in the MOBs van, arriving just as the bus is about to leave. O.B. hops on the bus and tells Summer that she only asked him twice to leave and everyone knows that it's three times for luck. After a hug and a kiss, they depart for London with Max looking on.

After arriving in London, Summer sets about trying to find Andrew Lloyd Webber so that she can try to get a part in one of his musicals.

On 1 February 2008, despite her nerves during an audition, Summer has successfully been offered a part of Maria in The Sound Of Music, one of Andrew Lloyd Webber's musicals.

On 15 February 2008, Summer made her exit from Hollyoaks, leading a new life to star in one of Andrew Lloyd Webber's musicals. But with O.B.'s second thoughts about moving out, Summer realises she has to start a new life alone, even without him.

On 28 February 2008, O.B. chased his dream and him and Summer got back together, with him remaining in London with her to start their new life. This is the last time she is seen onscreen.

== Reception ==
A writer from OK! called Summer a "Hollyoaks babe" and wrote that Summer "only spent a year in Hollyoaks Village, but in that short time she managed to get carbon monoxide poisoning, go through a number of intense relationships and land a part in Andrew Lloyd Webber's musical". They added that "many" questioned whether Strallen's casting on the soap was a "a huge PR stunt" due to Strallen being cast in the same production as the character.
