= Dominic Reilly =

Fictional character from Hollyoaks

- Hollyoaks character
- Portrayed by: John Pickard
- Duration: 2005–2010, 2013, 2025–2026
- First appearance: 9 September 2005
- Last appearance: 23 March 2026
- Introduced by: David Hanson (2005); Bryan Kirkwood (2013); Hannah Cheers (2025-2026)
- Spin-off appearances: Hollyoaks Later (2008, 2013)
In-universe information
- Occupation: Chef (2005–2010); PCSO (2009–2010)
- Father: Edward Hutchinson
- Mother: Diane Reilly
- Half-brothers: Tony Hutchinson; Eric Foster
- Half-sisters: Verity Hutchinson; Eva Hutchinson
- Wife: Tina McQueen (2007–2008); Carlotta Diaz (2013–present)
- Stepsons: Max McQueen
- Aunts: Victoria Hutchinson
- Nephews: Beau Ramsey; Harry Thompson; Anthony Hutchinson; Ro Hutchinson
- Nieces: Grace Hutchinson; Morgan Osborne; Dee Dee Hutchinson (adoptive)
- First cousins: Tony Hutchinson

Dominic "Dom" Reilly is a fictional character from the British Channel 4 soap opera Hollyoaks, played by John Pickard. Dom made his first appearance on 13 September 2005 as the estranged half-brother of Tony Hutchinson, whose portrayer, Nick Pickard, is John Pickard's brother. In July 2010, it was announced that the character was to leave the show which he did on 24 November 2010. Pickard reprised the role during the sixth series of Hollyoaks Later. On 19 August 2025, it was announced that Pickard would be reprising the role as part of the shows 30th anniversary, which is due to air in October. Dom returned on 14 October 2025. On 3 March 2026 it was announced that Pickard had reprised his role again to tie in with the exit of Tony's wife Diane Hutchinson.

== Casting ==
On 19 August 2005, Kris Green of Digital Spy reported that John Pickard had been cast as the brother of Tony Hutchinson, who is played by Pickard's own brother Nick Pickard.

In 2010, it was announced by Channel 4 that Pickard had quit Hollyoaks and would depart later in the year. Speaking of his decision, Pickard said, "I've really enjoyed my time on Hollyoaks and I shall be very sad to leave, but after five years, it's definitely time to move on. I've loved working with Nick and it's been great living in the North — Liverpool is such a great city and we've both made friends for life up here. I'll really miss the social side of this job because the people really have made it all the more fun. Dom has been such a great character to play but now I'm looking forward to taking on new roles."

On 12 June 2013, it was announced that Pickard had agreed to reprise the role of Dom for the sixth series of Hollyoaks Later.

== Storylines ==
After Grace Hutchinson's death from SIDS, Dom comforts Mandy Hutchinson (Sarah Jayne Dunn). Mandy develops feelings for Dom and leaves Tony, but continues to stay in contact with Dom. Dom begins a relationship with Tina McQueen (Leah Hackett) after they bond over their love of classic literature. Tina's sisters Michaela (Hollie-Jay Bowes) and Carmel McQueen (Gemma Merna) overhear Dom speaking lovingly on a phone to "Cathy", a character from he and Tina's favourite book, who they assume to be Kathy Barnes (Sarah Jane Buckley) and accuse Dom of having an affair. Dom then proposes to Tina, which she accepts. Just before their wedding day, Tina discovers Dom and Mandy's past feelings for each other and feels she cannot trust him. After some convincing, Tina goes through with the wedding.

Tina sleeps with Russ Owen (Stuart Manning) after she begins to feel neglected by Dom. At the same time, Tina agrees to have a surrogate child for Tony and Jacqui McQueen (Claire Cooper). After the insemination, Dom tries to get Tina to have an abortion, but later accepts her decision. Tina gives birth to Max McQueen and admits that Russ is the father, which causes Dom and Tina to split up. Dom and Tina reconcile when he finds her fatally wounded due to an explosion caused by Niall Rafferty (Barry Sloane). Dom becomes romantically involved with pole dancer Loretta Jones (Melissa Walton), however their relationship ends after he makes her choose between him and her career. Dom then goes into partnership at diner Relish with Ravi Roy (Stephen Uppal).

Tony admits his financial trouble to Dom, who vows to help Tony. At first Dom turns to Warren Fox (Jamie Lomas) for a loan of 10,000 pounds, however Warren instructs Dom to get a set of matches and burn the Il Gnosh down and on the same night, Il Gnosh is set on fire by an unseen arsonist, which causes the deaths of Steph Roach (Carley Stenson) and Malachy Fisher (Glen Wallace). Tony finds a picture of Amber Sharpe (Lydia Lloyd-Henry) on Dom's phone and accuses him of getting her pregnant, to which Dom protests his innocence. Ste Hay (Kieron Richardson) tells Dom he believes Brendan Brady (Emmett J. Scanlan) set the fire. Brendan threatens Dom, who admits to being the arsonist. Tony then confides in Dom, who again admits the truth, revealing he set the fire to destroy a laptop which Bart McQueen (Jonny Clarke) had told him had pictures of Amber on it. Tony tells Dom to tell the police. However, Dom pleads with Tony to let him leave the village. Tony disagrees and stands by Dom as he phones the police, who later lead him away. Dom attempts to clear his name once the truth is out about the fire by telling Tony it was Warren who was the real mastermind behind the fire, however due to Warren apparently meant to be dead, Tony does not believe Dom and leaves him to serve his prison sentence.
