= Hollyoaks Later =

Spin-off series (2008–2025) of Hollyoaks

- Genre: Drama
- Starring: Series 1 cast Series 2 cast Series 3 cast Series 4 cast Series 5 cast Series 6 cast 2020 Special cast
- Country of origin: United Kingdom
- Original language: English
- No. of series: 6
- No. of episodes: 32 (list of episodes)

Production
- Producers: Lucy Allan (series 1); Bryan Kirkwood (series 2; 2020 Special); Paul Marquess (series 3); Claire Fryer (series 4); Jane Steventon (series 5–6); Hannah Cheers (2025 special)
- Camera setup: Single-camera setup (2008 - 2013, 2020); Multiple-camera setup (2025)
- Running time: 60 minutes

Original release
- Network: E4
- Release: 24 November 2008 – 11 October 2013
- Release: 6 January 2020
- Release: 22 October 2025

Related
- Hollyoaks

Hollyoaks Later (originally Late Night Hollyoaks) is a British television spin-off of the Channel 4 soap opera Hollyoaks. The series allows for more sexual content, edgier storylines and stronger language than Hollyoaks. It ran from 2008 to 2013, and returned for two special episodes in 2020 and 2025.

In July 2025, it was revealed that Hollyoaks Later is coming back for a one off episode to mark Hollyoaks' 30th anniversary in October. It will feature a mix of "current, returning and new characters" this time around. An exact line-up will be revealed at a later date.

== Concept ==
Hollyoaks Later was devised after Hollyoaks had improved ratings. Tony Wood, creative director of Lime Pictures the production company of Hollyoaks, explained that it was decided that Hollyoaks would be expanded on because of its increased audience. Camilla Campbell, the commissioning editor for drama at Channel 4, said that Hollyoaks had grown up in "eyes of the viewers" and had begun being taken seriously by the television industry and critics. This meant that a late night slot for Hollyoaks allows for writers and producers to take "the drama to another level and show some willies and fannies, whilst also keeping the fun playfulness that Hollyoaks fans love". The series is darker in tone than parent show Hollyoaks and "explores issues difficult to dramatise in-depth before the watershed". Lime Pictures described the show and its purpose saying that "the series delves deeper into the lives, loves and misdemeanours of the Hollyoaks regulars, shedding their teen image as they look to find their feet away from the Village".

== Series 1 ==
On 5 June 2008, it was announced that a spin-off of Hollyoaks had been commissioned and would begin filming in September to transmit in November. It was confirmed the series would air on a post watershed slot on E4 for five episodes of one hour airing consecutively over five nights. It was revealed that four storylines would occur throughout the series: Craig Dean (Guy Burnet) returns to save Steph Dean (Carley Stenson) during a cliff-top confrontation, an unlikely marriage between Malachy Fisher (Glen Wallace) and Mercedes McQueen (Jennifer Metcalfe), the debut gig of Hollyoaks' band the Dirty Diegos and the students of Hollyoaks Community College go on a road trip.

== Series 2 ==
On 3 August 2009, it was revealed Hollyoaks Later had been recommissioned for a second series to air in September. The series again follows four storylines: siblings Hannah (Emma Rigby), Josh (Sonny Flood) and Rhys (Andrew Moss) go to a music festival, Tony Hutchinson (Nick Pickard) and Cindy Cunningham (Stephanie Waring) marry, Sarah Barnes (Loui Batley), Zoe Carpenter (Zoë Lister) and Lydia Hart (Lydia Kelly) go to boot camp which ends with "nightmare consequences" and Theresa McQueen (Jorgie Porter) and Michaela McQueen (Hollie-Jay Bowes) go to London. On the series, producer Bryan Kirkwood said: "We've selected some of the best loved Hollyoaks characters, put them in romantic, funny and dangerous situations and I'm hoping viewers love the result".

== Series 3 ==
On 19 April 2010, it was announced that Hollyoaks Later had been commissioned for a third series to air in October. Paul Marquess produced the series and explained that it had been "seamlessly integrated" with the main show. Roberto Troni, Channel 4 commissioning editor, said the storylines "will be a cocktail of fun, glamour and grown-up drama".

== Series 4 ==
On 4 March 2011 it was confirmed that Hollyoaks Later would return for a fourth series to air in September. Hollyoaks series editor Claire Fryer produced the series working alongside Hollyoaks executive producer Tony Wood and Carolyn Reynolds.

== Series 5 ==
On 18 May 2012, it was announced that Hollyoaks Later had again been recommissioned, with a fifth series due to air in September. Characters to be involved were revealed to include Brendan Brady (Emmett J. Scanlan), Mitzeee (Rachel Shenton) and Hollyoaks Sixth Form College students. Producer Emma Smithwick revealed that the storylines had been in the planning process for a while. She added that the episodes "will give the characters a whole new playing field in terms of how we tell their tales". Marianne Buckland, commissioning editor for Channel 4, said that the series "represents the next turn of the wheel for the brand and promises a glossier, more grown up feel. By their very nature, the lateness of Later allows us to be that little bit more risky and with Brendan Brady at the helm, a character so suited to a post-watershed stint, this year is more dark and dangerous than ever".

== Series 6 ==
A sixth series of the spin off was announced on 12 June 2013. Long term character Tony Hutchinson (Nick Pickard) will be reunited with former friends Kurt Benson (Jeremy Edwards) and Rory "Finn" Finnigan (James Redmond) as well as his brother Dom Reilly (John Pickard) "on an epic ride of Hangover-style proportions". They will also be joined by Trevor Royle (Greg Wood) and guest star Danny Dyer. Other storylines include Esther Bloom (Jazmine Franks), Tilly Evans (Lucy Dixon), Callum Kane (Laurie Duncan) and Holly Cunningham (Wallis Day) celebrating an 18th birthday "...in a rip-roaring plot as they all find danger in a cabin in the woods." Meanwhile, Theresa McQueen (Jorgie Porter) will join up with a new recruit of the McQueen clan on a wild road trip. Jane Steventon, who took charge of last year's successful series, will once again be the show's producer. The series will be executive produced by Hollyoaks boss Bryan Kirkwood. Kirkwood commented: "We are very happy to announce the commissioning of series six of Hollyoaks Later. It is a returning series that gives an annual late night treat to loyal Hollyoaks fans."

== 2020 Special ==
On 20 September 2019, it was announced that Hollyoaks Later would be making a one-off return in January 2020, which will focus on the conclusion of Breda McQueen's (Moya Brady) serial killer storyline. Joining Breda, characters such as Mercedes McQueen (Jennifer Metcalfe), Sylver McQueen (David Tag), and Diane Hutchinson (Alex Fletcher) will be involved. Other likely characters to appear are Breda's daughter Goldie McQueen (Chelsee Healey), and Breda's current pig-farm hostage, Tony Hutchinson (Nick Pickard). Tony's half-sister, Verity (Eva O'Hara), will also be making her first appearance in the late-night episode. It has been promised that the special one-off edition will feature much "blood and gore" and "a lot of violence", with the episode revolving "around the McQueens a lot".

It has been revealed that a huge fire will break out at Breda's pig farm, leaving several characters in danger.

It has been confirmed that the episode will debut at 9pm on E4, on Monday 6 January 2020, with a repeat at 11pm, Tuesday 7 January 2020, on Channel 4.

The episode is written by Heather Robson and directed by Neil J. Wilkinson.

== 2025 Special ==
In July 2025 it was announced by Channel 4 and Lime Pictures that Hollyoaks Later will be making a special one-off return in October 2025 as part of the shows 30th anniversary. During the announcement they revealed that at least two characters would be making a return for the late night special, those characters being Warren Fox (Jamie Lomas) and Theresa McQueen (Jorgie Porter) and also announced that fans will be introduced to a new character called Gemma, played by former Coronation Street actress Tisha Merry.

The day after the announcement of the one-off special, current Hollyoaks actors Kieron Richardson who plays Ste Hay, Isabelle Smith who plays Francine Osborne and Louis Emerick who plays Donny Clark all confirmed that they will be taking part in the episode. On 16 September 2025 it was announced that Danny Mac who plays Dodger Savage will also be appearing in the episode. The same month it was announced that Anya Lawrence who plays Vicky Grant will also be appearing in the episode. In October, spoiler pictures inadvertently revealed that Oscar Curtis who plays Lucas Hay, Nathaniel Dass who plays Dillon Ray and Charlie Behan who plays Charlie Dean would also be appearing in the special. That same month it was reported that Yasmin Davies, the daughter of Hollyoaks and Brookside actress Alex Fletcher, would portray Esme Dixon, the daughter of Fletcher's Brookside character Jacqui Dixon, in the episode.

== Casting ==
For each series of Hollyoaks Later cast members from Hollyoaks are selected by the producer of Hollyoaks Later Naim Ahmed to appear as their characters.

Bronagh Waugh was cast as Cheryl while Melissa Walton was cast as Loretta Jones for guest roles in the first series. Shortly after their roles series producer Lucy Allan introduced them as series regulars in Hollyoaks. Karen Hassan also appeared in a guest role in the first series of Hollyoaks Later as Lynsey. Two years after her role in Hollyoaks Later Hassan reprised the role and was introduced to Hollyoaks by series producer Paul Marquess. For the second series Nicola Stapleton was cast in a guest role as the friend of Cindy Cunningham, Savannah. Alison Burrows was also cast as the mother of Theresa McQueen, Kathleen McQueen, for a role in the second series of Hollyoaks Later which was planned to introduce the character before she joined Hollyoaks in a regular role.

The first series featured a cameo from British girl group The Saturdays. Singer Bonnie Tyler was asked to appear in the second series for a cameo role which she initially rejected before being persuaded to appear when offered a singing role. For the fifth series British rapper Lethal Bizzle was cast in a cameo role playing himself in scenes which featured him performing for a special VIP gig which Hollyoaks fans were offered the chance to attend.

== Transmissions ==
Series	Start date	End date	Episodes
1	24 November 2008	28 November 2008	5
2	28 September 2009	2 October 2009	5
3	25 October 2010	29 October 2010	5
4	5 September 2011	9 September 2011	5
5	17 September 2012	21 September 2012	5
6	7 October 2013	11 October 2013	5
Special	6 January 2020		1
Special	22 October 2025		1

== Reception ==
Rebecca Bowden of Yahoo! said that she "absolutely love[s] the late night Hollyoaks episodes and although they can often be filled with plotlines that verge precariously on the unbelievable side, they are also always packed full of drama, emotion and more explosive content than can be broadcast during the show's usual earlier weekday slot".
