= Kris Fisher =

Fictional character from Hollyoaks

- Hollyoaks character
- Portrayed by: Gerard McCarthy
- Duration: 2006–2010
- First appearance: 1 September 2006
- Last appearance: 18 November 2010
- Introduced by: Bryan Kirkwood (2006); Paul Marquess (2010)
- Spin-off appearances: Hollyoaks Later
In-universe information
- Occupation: Student (2006–2009); Barman (2008–2009); School counselor (2010); Banker (2010); Event planner (since 2010)
- Father: Eamon Fisher
- Mother: Erin Fisher
- Brothers: Malachy Fisher
- Sisters: Bernadette Fisher

Kris Fisher is a fictional character from the British Channel 4 soap opera Hollyoaks, played by Gerard McCarthy. The character first appeared on-screen in September 2006 and left in August 2010 after McCarthy quit the show. He is noted for his storylines involving the PEP treatment, a bisexual love triangle, his outlandish personality and being the only permanent cross dressing character in a British soap opera. Following his departure, it was announced that McCarthy would return in November 2010 for a short stint.

== Creation and casting ==
The character was created as one of four new students to be introduced into the series in 2006. At the time of creation the then producer of the series, Bryan Kirkwood described the character to actor Gerard McCarthy as "A cross between Pete Doherty, Pete Burns and Pete Bennett from Big Brother — a bit of a Boy George character." The character was initially intended for a 12 episode stint, but after the producer saw how popular he was with viewers they decided to make him a permanent character.

Auditions were held for the part of Kris, with actor Gerard McCarthy hailing from Belfast, Northern Ireland going onto secure the part. McCarthy had wanted a role in the show because actor Shaun Williamson had advised him to get a part to boost his profile. After initial screen tests with casting directors, he was called in to meet Kirkwood, who gave McCarthy the outline of the character, and later, he was contracted with the show long-term.

McCarthy considered leaving the series by Christmas 2008, but producers asked him to stay on to help portray a HIV storyline involving his on-screen brother. In early 2009 speculation came from magazines that he was about to quit the series after McCarthy's statement of his character saying: "There comes a time when every character reaches a point when it's natural and believable for them to leave. I think Kris's end should be this summer after he graduates." McCarthy went on to confirm his plans to quit the series, stating that he wanted to do different projects. However, in mid-2009 McCarthy revealed he had signed another year-long contract with the show because he loved playing the part.

== Development ==
=== Characterisation ===
Channel 4 publicity describes Kris as a feisty male. His feisty persona is prominent in the character's scenes, now and again a softer side to the character emerges. This softer side is often most played out on-screen in scenes involving the character's brother. McCarthy spoke about how is character put his guard up around characters other than his brother, Malachy. Malachy refers to Kris as Francis still and he also said: "For a long while, Kris was just this enigma that refused to be labelled. So to have his brother around - who knows exactly who he is and knows exactly why he is - just works. You see the real side of Kris when Malachy's around, as opposed to the 'performance' he puts on with others. He's like a Jekyll and Hyde character. When he's behind closed doors, he thinks he's 'safe'."

In 2009 McCarthy said of his character: "He is so 'out there', in your face and ready to shock at every turn. Every day he creates a new drama so who knows what the unconventional Kris will trigger." Discussing his character at length with The Belfast Telegraph he said "Kris is a non-conformist. If he wakes up in the morning and wants to dye his hair blue and stick a safety pin through his nose, then that's exactly what he'll do. The character is very colourful, but also very controversial". Going on to say: "He is what he is, a bolshy, ballsy lad from Belfast who doesn't give a damn. He doesn't care what people think about him. He goes out of his way to shock people and has so much confidence in himself, that no one can intimidate him. He's also very witty. I can be funny yeah, but I'm not quite as sharp as him. And of course, he can pull anyone he wants! I love Kris, he's a great character to play. When I come home from work every day, I have a smile on my face."

Kris' appearance has been a focal point of the character. At the time of auditioning for the role McCarthy perceived Kris' look to be gothic, but the casting team revealed that his look was to be aimed at provoking a reaction rather than a drag queen look, a mixture of celebrity styles taken from both Eddie Izzard or Russell Brand. McCarthy has also stated on one occasion that he doesn't believe his character is trying to cross dress or be a transvestite and rather simply creating his own unique style. McCarthy also helps to style Kris by trying to balance his look by using feminine parts along with other traditionally masculine items in the outfit. The Liverpool Echo have also commented that dark eyeliner is the character's trademark.

One particular item of the character's wardrobe caused controversy when on-screen he wore an LGBT campaign T-shirt. Off-screen Stonewall, a lesbian, gay and bisexual rights charity organisation, told The Guardian newspaper it had managed to get a character from the soap to wear their campaign T-shirt. The scenes drew criticism from an extremist Christian group claiming that soap operas are being 'lobbied' into pushing a politically correct view of modern Britain into their shows. Gary Nunn of Stonewall defended the scenes stating: "One of our key priorities is to promote fair coverage of lesbian and gay people in the media and we work with programme makers to reflect this, a recent example of this is our work with Hollyoaks where the character Kris Fisher wore a T-shirt with our campaign slogan: 'Some people are gay. Get over it!'."

=== PEP and love triangle ===
Malachy Fisher (Glen Wallace) was diagnosed with HIV, but had sex with Mercedes McQueen (Jennifer Metcalfe) numerous times. When Mercedes dumped Malachy, she sought comfort in Kris and the two ended up having sex together, unbeknown to Mercedes' possible HIV infection. When Malachy revealed that he had HIV to Kris, Kris admitted having sex with Mercedes, and subsequently rushed to the hospital to seek medical attention where he received Post-exposure prophylaxis drugs that made him extremely ill to lower the chances of getting HIV. He was later tested and got the clear and recovered from the medication. The use of PEP drugs was a first in British soap opera as at the time it was relatively new, and helped raise the awareness that there are precautions at lowering the risk of the disease available, post a potential infection.

One storyline for Kris has been a bisexual love triangle which resulted in a three way open relationship with Nancy Hayton (Jessica Fox) and Ravi Roy (Stephen Uppal).

== Storylines ==
Kris first appears in the freshman class with Zoe Carpenter (Zoe Lister) and Will Hackett (Oliver Farnworth). He clashes with his old friend Joe Spencer (Matt Kilburn). He was also involved in the Dog fire in which Sam Owen (Lois Tamone) sets set alight, in which his friends Olivia Johnson (Rochelle Gadd) and Joe die. Kris later believes he has HIV after Will fools him into believing that his test results were positive. Later Kris started having sex with a man called Nathan, but when his brother Malachy comes to Hollyoaks, he pretends Nathan is a friend and starts wearing masculine clothes, as Malachy doesn't know that he is bisexual or that he likes wearing women's clothes. Jessica Harris (Jennifer Biddall) tries to persuade him to dress up for Malachy but when he does, his brother disowns him. He takes comfort with Jess and they end up in bed together. Kris later leaves and returns a number of months later. Malachy also returns later to work on a construction job. While they still don't not agree on most topics, Malachy grows to accept his brother, and when Malachy leaves in January 2008, Kris is sad to see him go.

Another storyline the character was involved in a carbon monoxide poisoning plot. Danny Valentine (David Judge) had made a faulty repair to a boiler, causing a carbon monoxide leak that left Kris, John Paul McQueen (James Sutton), Katy Fox (Hannah Tointon), Summer (Summer Strallen), Zak Ramsey (Kent Riley), Carmel McQueen (Gemma Merna), Russ Owen (Stuart Manning), and other students unconscious. Justin Burton (Chris Fountain) later arrived to try and win Katy back and instead found everyone unconscious. After ringing Danny and finding that the boiler faulty, the pair carried everyone out saving them in the process. The storyline which had touched a very common issue in everyday life, helped save the life of regular Hollyoaks viewer Beth Cordingly, who was watching the episode when she was experiencing the same ordeal.

Kris later starts dating Summer, and his old flame Jess leaves the village with Darren Osborne's (Ashley Taylor Dawson) gambling winnings. His relationship with Summer soon ends when she falls in love with O.B. (Darren Jeffries).

When John Paul listens to Kris telling a sexually confused teenager to get a life and stop thinking they are special, he calls into the radio show. Kris then needles him about his relationship with Craig Dean (Guy Burnet). John Paul and Elliot Bevan (Garnon Davies) go to the station to confront Kris, but a blackout ends any attempt to resolve the issue. John Paul and Elliot begin interrupting Kris' broadcasts with a pirate program which makes fun of him. This continues off and on for over a month until January 2008. Kris finds out he might lose his radio show because the pirates are more popular. When John Paul tries to start up an organization for LGBT students at HCC, Kris initially doesn't get along with him, but they become friends. Kris soon realises John Paul has a mystery crush, and tries to figure out who it is. He is surprised to learn the man is Father Kieron Hobbs (Jake Hendriks), who tells Kris he also has feelings for John Paul.

During the second half of 2008 a new storyline was brewing which saw Kris' father become the victim of a life insurance scam. On-screen his father, Eamon Fisher (Derek Halligan) turns up at Halls wanting to see Kris. Once Kris returns, Eamon is shocked to see his son and what he is wearing. Kris then tell Eamon that he doesn't want anything to do with him and tells Elliot that he can have him as a father instead. After days of getting nowhere, Eamon leaves and tries to get a room to stay in at the pub. Upon failing, he retreats to the street and has a heart attack in the car park, alone. Darren finds Eamon and convinces Jack to run away while he passes Eamon off as Jack's (James McKenna) corpse. This is in order to get life insurance after spiralling debt.

When Darren finally tells Frankie Osborne (Helen Pearson) that Jack isn't dead after all, and she discovers that the man they used was Kris' dad, she worries as Malachy concern grows about his dad and that the police might find out about the fraud. She phones Kris' mobile, pretending to be a hotel owner in Normandy, France, to tell him that his father had recently left the hotel without paying. Kris assumes he has been wine tasting- as he expected. He tells Malachy, who informs the police. Malachy later returns to ask Kris whether he knows the whereabouts of their father. Later, Darren Osborne tells them that their father is the man who had been buried, not Jack Osborne. The brothers return to Ireland to tell their mother the news. Malachy then finds out he is HIV positive, Kris thinks he too has contracted it after he sleeps with Mercedes. Kris avoids contraction through the use of the PEP drug.

During the events of Hollyoaks Later, Kris and his brother Malachy return home to Ireland to bury their late father. While at home Kris bumps into his former girlfriend Lindsey whom he had planned to go travelling with but instead moved to Hollyoaks. The pair share all their favourite moments from when they were younger, and eventually Lindsey tells Kris that she is going to fulfil their dream and travel the world. Kris wishes her the best and the pair go their separate ways with Kris returning to Hollyoaks. Later Kris helps Malachy get back with Mercedes McQueen and the pair later marry at the end of the spin-off. Kris was present for the wedding and later sang at their reception.

Kris becomes friendly with couple Ravi and Nancy and later stars sleeping with them both when Nancy walks in on Kris and Ravi they all eventually decide to start a three way relationship but end the agreement because Nancy thinking it's too weird. He later managed a local short-lived band consisting of Hayley, Rhys and Josh. Kris then goes on to get a job in a call centre, then become involved with a vengeful gangster when he and his flatmates withhold a large sum of money they find. Kris then gets back with Nancy and there are problems early on in the relationship when their friend Sarah Barnes (Loui Batley) is murdered and Zoe gets the blame, they both stand by her until she is cleared of all involvement. Kris gets back together with Nancy but when Nancy's ex-husband Jake Dean (Kevin Sacre) then returns after a stint in a mental hospital for over year, this put a strain on their relationship. Kris finds out about Mercedes and Calvin Valentine's (Ricky Whittle) affair and his disgusted with her betrayal of his brother.

Kris gets a job as school counselor and becomes increasingly worried about Ricky Campbell (Ashley Margolis). When Des Townsend (Kris Deedigan) puts Ricky in detention, Kris spots his time to shine and tries to talk to Ricky about any problems but Ricky tries to escape to get back to his Dad. Determined to do his job well, Kris tries to stop Ricky, but ends up breaking his arm. Kris goes to see Ricky at his home to apologise only to realise that Ricky is a carer for his disabled dad Martin Campbell (Grant Masters). Des starts making homophobic remarks to Kris and starts rumours that Kris is sleeping with under age Rick forcing Kris to give up his job.

Kris starts to regularly look after Martin who is dying of multiple sclerosis. Martin then shocks Kris by asking for his help to die. However Kris refuses and then gets him admitted to hospital. Kris leaves Hollyoaks with Zak and Jake after Zoe offers him a job party planning. Kris returns three months later after hearing that Malachy was badly injured in a fire with Mercedes and he is dying. When Mercedes decides to switch Malachy's life support machine off, Kris refuses to allow her to. However, after realising that doctors cannot do anything for Malachi, Kris reluctantly gives Mercedes his blessing to switch the machine off and let Malachi go. Kris, Mercedes, Cheryl and Lynsey Nolan (Karen Hassan) then say a tearful goodbye to Malachy as he dies of his injuries. This is Kris's last appearance.

== Reception ==
For their role as Kris, McCarthy was nominated for "Best Newcomer" at the 2007 Inside Soap Awards. McCarthy stated that he initially worried about how his character would be received in his home city, Belfast. He spoke of his shock that 'macho men' were praising him about his character, even by drunk men. He also spoke that many people love his outspoken nature and is also popular amongst girls. The Radio Times have described Kris following his love triangle storyline stating: "With more free love than California in the 60s, Kris does nothing to dissuade those who think bisexuals are just greedy. After a clinch with Ravi, the frisky DJ falls straight into Nancy's arms, too."
