= Kevin Sacre =

British actor (born 1978)

Kevin Sacre is a British actor. He appeared as Jake Dean in the Channel 4 British soap opera Hollyoaks from 2002 to 2010.

== Career ==
Sacre began his career at the Royal Shakespeare Company followed by the television series Night and Day for ITV in which he played Dennis Doyle from 2001 to 2002, followed by Hollyoaks. He left the show in May 2008. In December 2008, Kevin played the lead in Aladdin at Sheffield Lyceum Theatre. On 6 July 2009, it was confirmed Sacre would be returning to the role of Jake Dean. Sacre made a cameo appearance in the Ricky Gervais show Extras. He also made a guest appearance on The Weakest Link alongside co-star Ali Bastian. Sacre took part in, and won, Living TV's The Underdog Show where ten celebrities train ten rescue dogs.

== Personal life ==
He married professional dancer Camilla Dallerup in 2010 in Ibiza.
