= Steph Cunningham =

Fictional character from Hollyoaks

- Hollyoaks character
- Portrayed by: Carley Stenson
- Duration: 2000–2011
- First appearance: 29 March 2000
- Last appearance: 26 December 2011
- Introduced by: Jo Hallows
- Spin-off appearances: Hollyoaks: In Too Deep (2004); Hollyoaks Later (2008–2009)
In-universe information
- Other names: Stephanie De La Dean
- Occupation: Waitress (2007–2010); Businesswoman (2008–2010); Dance teacher (2009–2010)
- Father: Johnno Dean
- Mother: Frankie Osborne
- Brothers: Jake Dean; Craig Dean
- Sisters: Debbie Dean
- Half-brothers: Presley Dean; Brian Bloom
- Husband: Max Cunningham (2008); Gilly Roach (2010)
- Nieces: Esther Bloom

Steph Roach (also Dean and Cunningham) is a fictional character from the British Channel 4 soap opera Hollyoaks, played by Carley Stenson. She debuted on-screen during the episode airing on 29 March 2000. Steph was introduced into the serial by executive producer Jo Hallows. In 2009 Stenson decided to quit, but the then producer Lucy Allan convinced her to stay to play out a dramatic storyline. The announcement of her departure was made public in June 2010. Stenson's fellow cast members have described her as a "Hollyoaks legend" because of her lengthy duration.

Steph has been described as having a highly confident persona, a trait Stenson enjoyed portraying throughout. Steph is also played as "fame hungry". She is noted for a number of high-profile storylines such as the portrayal of bullying in a school environment, the portrayal of epilepsy, which Stenson felt had been a 'taboo subject' for too long. Other stories include becoming a widow and her involvement in Niall Rafferty's revenge plot and her constant desire for fame. One of Steph's final storylines was the portrayal of cervical cancer, which Stenson conducted extensive research into. Steph was subsequently killed off in a special block of episodes branded by the media as "fire week". Some critics described her final storylines as "upsetting" and "surprising". Steph's relationship with Gilly Roach (Anthony Quinlan) was viewed unfavourable by most. Stenson has been nominated for several different awards for her portrayal of Steph.

== Development ==
=== Casting and characterisation ===
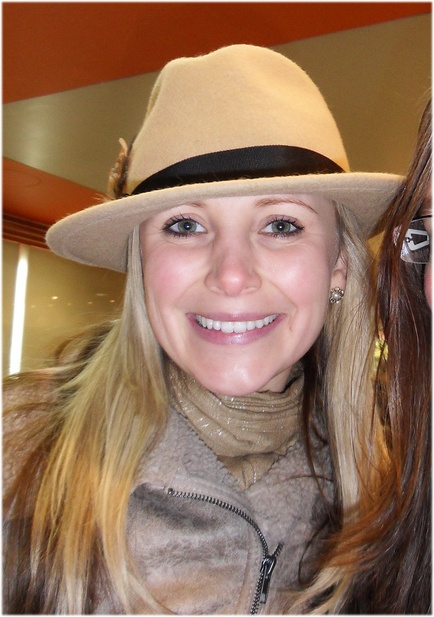
Carley Stenson (pictured) said that Steph is a "lovable rogue who just likes making mischief for attention."

Stenson originally auditioned to play a friend of the established character Zara Morgan (Kelly Greenwood). Although unsuccessful, the Hollyoaks casting team later asked her to apply for the new role of Steph Cunningham, and placed her straight into the final stage of auditions. She was delighted to subsequently be given the part, which was her first major television role. Stenson joined the cast straight after leaving high school, aged seventeen. She made her first appearance in March 2000, and by 2010 had become the longest-serving female cast member remaining. Steph originally featured in the series as a recurring character for two stints. Producers were impressed with Stenson's performance and by September 2000, they had invited her to join the show fulltime. Stenson revealed that Steph would return with "greater prominence".

Steph was introduced as a friend of Zara's, who was initially "quite naïve" and easily led. Within two years, her personality had altered greatly. Steph became a bully, and "a bit of a bitch". Stenson enjoyed this transformation into a villain, as she believed it made Steph a more memorable character. She also felt she could "really go somewhere" with Steph's bitchiness in her acting, but in contrast struggled to portray her more genuine moments. She commented that Steph is the type of character only to cry over things she "really cares about". Stenson found this difficult to relate to, and struggled to "find a balance between pushing it too far and far enough". She ultimately preferred to play her as a bitch, though one "more comical rather than just out-and-out nasty."

Stenson assessed that Steph "really isn't all bad, more of a lovable rogue who just likes making mischief for attention." She deemed her character "very unpredictable", with a great deal of confidence. The LINC Online called her a "beautiful blonde wild child with a penchant for arrogance and displays of egotism". Sarah Moolla of The People branded her "superficial", the Daily Record's Merle Brown referred to her as "a true red-blooded female, and Emma Johnson of the Liverpool Echo assessed that she had a "couldn't-care-less" attitude. BBC America described Steph as a two-sided character. They observed that as well as a bitch, she could be "dishonest, vain, jealous and small-minded", and wrote "She causes trouble when she wants to and will happily lie and gossip to get her own way." Conversely, they noted that for those on her good side, "She can be your best friend, a confidante and sweet natured girl".

As Steph developed, she was revealed to have a "softer side". Beneath her tough façade was a "deeply insecure little girl who crave[d] love and affection." An "artistic and creative" streak lead her to attend performing arts college. This inspired a rivalry with fellow actor Summer Shaw (Summer Strallen), which saw Steph "determined to keep the limelight on her." Stenson downplayed her vocal ability, and opined that Steph is "hardly the world's best singer".

=== Family and relationships ===
In late 2002, more than two years after Steph's arrival, her family were introduced to the series. The dynamics of the Dean family evolved with time. They were initially a dysfunctional unit, but in a different way to other Hollyoaks families, as they tended to disrupt the lives of others whilst being happy amongst themselves. Upon their arrival, actress Helen Pearson, who plays mother Frankie Dean, assessed that they were "really supportive of each other", and "quite solid, like an old-fashioned family unit", despite their lack of finances which required them to undertake "various scams to keep body and soul together." As time went on, the Deans were affected by affairs and parental separation, more typical of the soap's other families.

Writers introduced Steph into a friendship group with the show's other teenagers who included Zara Morgan (Kelly Greenwood), Abby Davies (Helen Noble), Lisa Hunter (Gemma Atkinson), Lee Hunter (Alex Carter) and Brian Drake (Jonathan Le Billon). Steph was portrayed differently to the rest of the group, with the example of a story involving a rumour club. The students are set a task of creating a rumour club to assess how quickly gossip can spread around a community. The assignment is supposed to be fun but the possibility of people getting emotionally hurt excites Steph. Stenson told an Inside Soap reporter that Steph's motivation is "purely evil". She enjoys "setting the cat amongst the pigeons" and watching her handiwork play out. Writers showcased Steph's "bitchy" side perfectly in the story, as she creates a rumour about Mandy Richardson (Sarah Jayne Dunn) and Laura Burns (Lesley Johnston) being lesbians and in a relationship. Lee dislikes Steph's plans but writers showed the Steph's nasty influence over her friends when Lee is too afraid to oppose her. Stenson concluded it showed Steph disliked other "pretty girls" and "likes nothing better than being a cow" towards them.

Steph had several romances throughout her time in the series. In her early years, Stenson played her as a flirt, who acted out for the attention of boys. Her first lovers included Christian virgin Brian Drake and football playing "lothario" Scott Anderson (Daniel Hyde). Her later relationship with Cameron Clark (Ben Gerrard) had "ups and downs" due to his obsessive-compulsive disorder. To boost his confidence she forced him to join a rock band. Her actions were successful, and Stenson said Steph was "proud" of this. She sacrificed their relationship so Cameron could leave and tour Europe. Sarah Ellis of Inside Soap praised Steph for being so supportive, despite Cameron's "erratic behaviour".

Steph appeared to "finally [find] happiness" when she fell in love with Max Cunningham (Matt Littler). Although attracted to her, Max initially resisted Steph as he believed her to be a "ditzy, air-headed blonde", only interested in "bad boys." When his younger brother Tom (Ellis Hollins) developed a crush on her, the "kind, sensitive way" Steph handled it altered his impression. Littler explained, "Max begins to realise there's more to her than her looks. He begins to think she's actually really nice and they become friends."." Littler quit the series in 2008, and producers planned his exit around Max's wedding to Steph. He was killed off on their wedding day, as he pulled Tom out of the path of a car. Before she filmed the aftermath of Max's death, Stenson listened to depressing music to reach her character's bereaved mindset. Stenson believed it was a mistake to kill Max off, and "such an awful thing to happen to Steph", until she received "amazing feedback" about the storyline. In the aftermath, Tom asked Steph to be his mother, in a scene that then-executive producer Bryan Kirkwood deemed his favourite of the year. The interaction between the two was intended to represent "what Hollyoaks is all about - lots of heart, relationships, friendships, love and loss." Kirkwood praised Stenson's performance throughout the storyline, particularly during that scene.

Steph has a brief fling with Niall Rafferty (Barry Sloane). The actors were required to film "steamy scenes". Stenson felt it a "hard challenge" to portray, she had to convince the audience that Steph would genuinely get together with her husband's killer. Some viewers, including all the staff of Inside Soap believed their chemistry to be greater. Stenson ultimately decided Steph was "better suited" to Max. She hoped that Steph would have even "more drama around the corner" along with "a bit of comic relief".

=== Illnesses ===
==== Epilepsy ====
"It was the first thing I worried about, that people who have it would watch it and think, 'That's so not what it's about and that's so not how I feel.' Especially having the fit because I didn't want it to look laughable. It was very difficult."

— Stenson talking to LINC Online about her initial fears of portraying epilepsy. (2006)

In a storyline which Stenson found challenging to portray, Steph was diagnosed with epilepsy. Feeling a responsibility to members of the viewing public who have the disorder, the actress researched it extensively, assisted by Mersey Television. As well as reading about it, she visited several organisations, and spent a day on set with a teenage girl—close in age to Steph—who has the condition, and who shared insights on the experiences she had been through. The actress felt trepidation about acting out seizures, but for her first one was assisted by the episode's director, who had witnessed seizures first-hand, having once worked in a hospital. Stenson felt privileged to be chosen for the storyline, particularly as epilepsy is typically a taboo subject which had not featured prominently in a soap opera before.

Barbara Pinder of Epilepsy Action praised the serial for taking on the subject matter. Hollyoaks researchers contacted the charity when developing the storyline, and Pinder felt that the show succeeded in communicating the impact of Steph's diagnosis. She stated, "It is great to see a soap opera, specially one that is watched mainly by young people, look at the issue of epilepsy as it often gets ignored." Stenson was pleased the storyline was "reaching out to people", and stated that she had received many letters from fans thanking her for highlighting an under-exposed subject, as well as positive feedback on the Hollyoaks website.

Steph initially reacted angrily towards her diagnosis, which Pinder confirmed was not uncommon, explaining: "The character is going through stages that someone with epilepsy is likely to go through. Teenagers can have terrible trouble coming to terms with epilepsy at a time when they have a lot of other difficult things to deal with. It can also be quite a blow to their independence." Writing for the Sunday Mail, Steve Hendry assessed that the plot would serve to "bring the arrogant and often spiteful Steph down a peg or two", humbling her. Stenson agreed that Steph's epilepsy would make her "more understanding", inspiring thoughtfulness towards others, as opposed to her former rejection of those different to her. However, she observed that the condition may also serve to worsen her behaviour towards "a chosen few." The character's epilepsy was further explored in the Hollyoaks spin-off In Too Deep, in which Steph has a seizure and believes she is possessed by a spirit, almost causing her to drown.

==== Cervical cancer ====
In 2010, Steph was diagnosed with cervical cancer and underwent a hysterectomy. It was devised prior to the appointment of Paul Marquess as executive producer. He chose to continue with it, deciding that it would be interesting to give Steph another serious storyline, and have a character that viewers "know and love going through a really hard time." In preparation for the storyline, Stenson studied the illness to give her a time-line of the experiences Steph would undergo. She chose not to speak with any cancer patients about coping with cancer, believing that everyone handles it in their own personal way. Additionally, she aimed to make Steph's realisation of her cancer as believable as possible, explaining that: "Steph wouldn't have any prior knowledge about what to expect, and I wanted to see it fresh through her eyes". She was flattered to be trusted with the storyline, and found it particularly important to get her portrayal right as, during the previous year, she had fronted the Arm Against Cervical Cancer campaign.

The producers aimed to send a message of early detection to the series' young audience, and had Steph initially ignore her symptoms. Stenson hoped to raise awareness of cervical cancer, and educate women about the importance of regular smear tests. She stated that Steph was confident about beating her illness, as "the alternative [wa]sn't worth thinking about." The character was originally reluctant to tell her family about the cancer for fear of hurting them, and was embarrassed to tell her love interest Gilly Roach (Anthony Quinlan), not wanting him to have to look after her. As the storyline developed, Steph cancelled her wedding to Gilly due to his refusal to accept that her condition was terminal. Quinlan explained that his character impeded her ability to deal with the situation, with his disbelief contrasting Steph's attempt to "take this in her stride and [...] spend quality time with the people she loves before she goes."

Marquess deemed the storyline as a whole one which could only be depicted the way it was in Hollyoaks, aiming to tell a "tragic story" with a "sweet and humorous tone"." A comedy element of the storyline had Steph use her cancer as a sob story to enter a talent show, recruiting orphan Tom to take to the stage with her, giving her story further emotional impact. Stenson commented, "Deep down she knows she's not a fantastic singer, but she thought the judges would feel sorry for her and put her through." According to Quinlan, viewer feedback on the storyline was "brilliant". He stated that viewers were upset by Steph's illness, and that it had even brought his own mother to tears.

=== Departure and death ===
In 2010, it was announced that Stenson had decided to quit the serial to pursue a career in musical theatre. She deemed it "one of the most difficult decisions [she had] ever made", stating that Hollyoaks had been her "dream job" and that she would miss her friends in the cast and crew. She made the decision to resign around June 2009, but was convinced by then-producer Lucy Allan to play out a long exit storyline, which concluded filming in September 2010. Before filming her final scenes, Stenson secured her first West End role. Though she had previously felt ready to leave the series, when the time came, she was upset because she felt the reality of it. She called her final scenes "really sad and emotional".

Hollyoaks devised an arson plot to begin on Guy Fawkes Night 2010, as a result of which some characters would die. The production team intended to keep details of who would die secret until transmission. Prior to broadcast, Stenson revealed that Steph would risk her own life to save Amy Barnes (Ashley Slanina-Davies), Leah Barnes (Jessica Croft-Lane) and Lucas Hay. The actress explained that "She stares death in the face every day because of her cancer, so thinks she really has nothing to lose now." Stenson performed one of her own stunts during filming, with the rest undertaken by a stunt double. A promotional trailer for the episodes aired across the Channel 4 network, featuring Steph on fire. In the event, Steph rescued Amy and her children from a burning building but refused to leave herself, saying she was ready to die. Her exit received a positive reaction from fans on the social networking website Twitter, with Stenson stating that she was "honoured" by the response. Steph's legacy continued following her death, with her husband, family and friends left to come to terms with their grief. On 29 November 2011 it was confirmed Stenson was to reprise the role for a one off guest appearance as Steph in which she appears as an angel to Doug Carter who had attempted suicide and she convinces him that his life matters. Steph tells Doug something and he shows Frankie a special song that Steph had recorded for her. Frankie, overjoyed that her daughter had not forgotten her, wept whilst Angel Steph looked on happily and placed a hand on her shoulder before winking to Tom and returning to heaven, stating she was "ready for her solo."

== Storylines ==
Steph is introduced as a new student at Hollyoaks High, with early storylines focusing on her school life and best friend Zara. She frequently bullies fellow pupil Lisa, driving her to attempt suicide. When Steph's friends react disapprovingly, she apologises and promises to change. She cultivates a promiscuous reputation, having brief relationships with Brian and footballer Scott Anderson (Daniel Hyde). Steph eventually becomes friends with Lisa, but accidentally ruins her hair while attempting to dye it. Believing that she did so on purpose, her other friends shun her. Distracted by the quarrel, Steph does not notice that she is being stalked by serial killer Toby Mills (Henry Luxemburg). He attacks her, hitting her in the head with a spanner and leaving her to die. Steph is comatose for a week, and is diagnosed with epilepsy when she regains consciousness. Upon learning that Toby is Lisa's brother-in-law, Steph resumes her bullying. Johnno eventually catches her physically attacking Lisa, and orders her to leave her alone. The two go on to attend university together, where Steph apologises for her cruelty and they are able to reconcile.

In the aftermath of her epilepsy diagnosis, Steph is initially unable to deal with her condition. Her father, Johnno Dean (Colin Wells) supports her, but ends up abandoning his family following the revelation that he has a secret son. Steph's mother Frankie remarries, and she comes to see her new stepfather, Jack Osborne (Jimmy McKenna), as a father figure, despite remaining close to her father and becomes the only family member to visit him. Steph largely reforms following her epilepsy diagnosis, becoming more sensitive to the needs of others. She comes to terms with how dangerous her condition could be if uncontrolled, and in time her epileptic episodes become less frequent. Steph fails her college exams and is forced to retake them. Fuelled by jealousy of her sister's West End success, she attempts to embark on a celebrity career. She appears in the fictional television show Bid Crazy TV, and auditions for a girl band, X-Pose, which transpires to be a money-making scam. She then sells a kiss and tell story on celebrity Joe Jones, who she meets after a failed audition to become one of his backing singers. When Steph's notoriety peters out, her stepbrother and agent Darren arranges for her to have sex with a footballer. After their liaison, Steph discovers that he is actually just the team's mascot. Humiliated, she abandons her pursuit of fame. In a comedy storyline, Steph's great-aunt Reenie leaves her an inheritance, said to be a "small fortune", on the condition that Steph performs a charitable act. She fulfils the requirement by saving Leo Valentine (Brian Bovell) from choking, however discovers that Small Fortune is, in fact, a donkey. Steph sends it to live at a donkey sanctuary.

Steph becomes a babysitter to Tom Cunningham (Ellis Hollins), and later begins a relationship with his older brother, Max Cunningham (Matt Littler). They get engaged, but have an on-off relationship fraught with frequent arguments. Steph's friend, Niall Rafferty (Barry Sloane) falls madly in love with her and attempts to come between them. She and Max eventually marry, but on their wedding day, Niall accidentally runs Max over, killing him. After a period of intense grief, Steph has sex with Niall. He is revealed to be a villain, holding his family hostage and killing his sister, Tina Reilly (Leah Hackett). A frightened Steph goes to stay with her brother Craig (Guy Burnet) in Scotland. Niall follows her, and takes Steph, Tom and Craig hostage. After a stand-off in which Craig makes Niall acknowledge the hurt he has caused, Niall throws himself off a cliff to his death. After a long holiday with Tom, Steph begins to put her life back together. She falls for dance teacher Fernando Fernandez (Jeronimo Best), inspiring jealousy in Gilly Roach (Anthony Quinlan), who has feelings for Steph. She and Fernando become engaged, as do Gilly and Cheryl Brady (Bronagh Waugh), Steph's employee. Realising that she loves Gilly, Steph breaks up with Fernando, but due to loyalty to Cheryl, refuses to date Gilly when he breaks up with her. Gilly briefly becomes engaged to Jem Costello (Helen Russell-Clark), but ultimately leaves her to be with Steph.

Steph discovers she has cervical cancer, and has a hysterectomy. In the aftermath, she decides to pursue a singing career and applies for The X Factor. Despite using her cancer as a sob story, she is rejected at her audition. Her cancer spreads, and though Steph has chemotherapy, she is later told that her condition is terminal. Gilly struggles to cope with her diagnosis, almost causing Steph to cancel their wedding. It goes ahead, however, and after their honeymoon, Steph begins to make plans for her impending death. When Il Gnosh, a local Italian restaurant catches fire, Steph saves Amy Barnes and her children, but chooses to remain inside and die. After Steph's funeral, her family and friends watch video messages she recorded for them prior to her death. On 11 March 2011, Cindy returns and Darren tells her about Steph and plays her the goodbye message. On 26 December, Steph made a one-off appearance as a ghost to Doug Carter (PJ Brennan).

== Reception ==
Stenson received several award nominations for her portrayal of Steph. She was nominated in the "Best Comedy Performance" category at the 2005 and 2006 British Soap Awards, and for "Best Dramatic Performance" in 2009. She received a long-list nomination for the "Best Actress" accolade at the 2005 National Television Awards. In 2008, Stenson was nominated for the "Sexiest Female" Inside Soap Award, which she found flattering. A further nomination in the same category followed in 2010, accompanied by nominations for "Best Actress", and "Best Dramatic Performance" for Steph learning she had cancer. The character was selected as one of the "top 100 British soap characters" by industry experts for a poll to be run by What's on TV, with readers able to vote for their favourite character to discover "Who is Soap's greatest Legend?" Steph and Max were voted as the show's "Favourite Couple" at the 2007 Hollyoaks Awards.

Following her departure, her co-stars commented favourably on the actress and character, with Jorgie Porter deeming her an "ultimate original", Gemma Merna stating that she "was Hollyoaks", and Ricky Whittle admitting that he cried during the airing of her final scenes. Television and entertainment website Holy Soap did not see Steph's fire death coming, calling her actions brave and her ten-year duration "mammoth". They described her most memorable moment as telling Niall she did not love him and then watching him commit suicide. Inside Soap said if there was an award for "the unluckiest character in soap", Steph would certainly win. In his column for The Guardian, television critic Jim Shelley stated that it was time for Steph to go, having "suffered enough" during her tenure. Humorously recapping her ten years in Hollyoaks, Shelley wrote:

Steph lived a rich, not to say happy, life. She was a bully and wannabe Wag, before miraculously transforming herself into the show's tragic heroine, suffering cervical cancer, epilepsy and a hysterectomy. Her husband was run over on their wedding day. Steph later slept with his killer (long story). She also watched him in horror as he threw himself off a cliff. So, unlucky in love... She reported her brother for rape, was stalked by a serial killer and inherited a donkey. It's all on Wikipedia, and I don't think it's been tampered with. I mean, who the hell could make that up?

Sarah Welsh of the South Wales Echo gave the stalking storyline a negative review. She called both plot and acting "ridiculous" and commented that while she often felt sorry for the serial being snubbed at the National Soap Awards, "This is not the way to raise the game."

Steph's relationships were a focal point of many reviews. The Daily Mirror's Nicola Methven and Polly Hudson found a 2004 love triangle between Steph, her sister Debbie Dean (Jodi Albert) and love interest Dan Hunter (Andrew McNair) "surprising compelling". Grace Dent of The Guardian observed of her failed engagement to Fernando: "With the best will in the world, I don't feel that marriage was ever going to last". Dent had previously named Steph singing the Sugababes' "About You Now" at Max's funeral one of her four favourite soap moments of 2008. Roz Laws of the Sunday Mercury felt there was "plenty of chemistry" between Steph and Gilly.

Reviewing the Steph-centric spin-off In Too Deep for The Times, Tim Teeman commented that while late-night Hollyoaks episodes had previously been amusing, "sexed-up" versions of the main show, with In Too Deep it became "less shagathon, more What Lies Beneath". The episode was selected as recommended viewing by Laws of the Sunday Mercury. The launch of Hollyoaks Later series one, in which Niall returns to target Steph, was named a "Satellite Pick of the Day" by the Daily Record. Christopher Howse, writing "Tatworld" for The Daily Telegraph—a column chronicling tabloid culture—named Steph and her family joint tenth in a list of Top Ten Deans, which included entrants such as Dean Koontz, Dean Gaffney and Richard Dean Anderson.
