= Lucy Allan (producer) =

English television producer (born 1978)

- Born: Lucy Jane Allan; 30 September 1978 (age 47); Liverpool, England
- Occupation: Television producer
- Years active: 1997–present
- Television: Hollyoaks

Lucy Jane Allan (born 30 September 1978) is an English television producer, best known for her work on the Channel 4 soap opera Hollyoaks. Allan's other credited work includes a script editor for Dream Team and assistant to the director in Chica de Río.

== Hollyoaks ==
In 2008, Allan began working with Bryan Kirkwood as the deputy producer for Hollyoaks. She was the assistant producer and producer for Hollyoaks' spin-offs Hollyoaks: No Going Back and the first series of Hollyoaks Later. Allan took over from Kirkwood as the executive producer of Hollyoaks in January 2009. Her first credited appearance as producer was on 1 June 2009. Allan was responsible for introducing characters including Loretta Jones, Cheryl Brady, Charlotte Lau and Dave Colburn and brought back characters including Jake Dean. It was announced in January 2010 that Allan had decided to step down from her position and would be replaced by Paul Marquess. In November 2020, it was announced that Allan would be reprising her role as executive producer of Hollyoaks, as well as becoming the head of continuing drama at Lime Pictures. Her episodes began airing from 2 August 2021.

In August 2023, Lime Pictures announced that Allan had stepped down as executive producer after two years in the role.

== Selected credits ==
- Hollyoaks (multiple roles, 2002–2010; executive producer, 2021–2023)
- Waterloo Road (producer)
- Leonardo (producer)
- House of Anubis (producer)
- Rocket's Island (producer)
- The Dumping Ground (executive producer)
- Wolfblood (executive producer)
- The Worst Witch (executive producer)
- Get Even (executive producer)
