= Jennifer Metcalfe =

English actress (born 1983)

- Born: Jennifer Joanne Metcalfe; 4 September 1983 (age 43); Bradford, England
- Occupations: Actress; fitness instructor
- Years active: 1998–present
- Known for: Role of Mercedes McQueen in Hollyoaks
- Partner: Greg Lake (2012–2020)
- Children: 1

Jennifer Joanne Metcalfe (born 4 September 1983) is a British actress from Bradford, England. She is known for her role as Mercedes McQueen in the Channel 4 soap opera Hollyoaks, which she has appeared in since 2006. Her portrayal of the character has led to her reprising the role in the programme's spin-off series Hollyoaks Later between 2008 and 2020. She appeared as a contestant in the sixth series of Dancing on Ice in 2011, where she finished in tenth place.

== Early life ==
Metcalfe was born in Bradford and grew up on the Holme Wood housing estate. She attended the Scala Kids drama school in her hometown. In between acting jobs, Metcalfe worked as a fitness instructor in Bradford.

== Career ==
In her early roles, Metcalfe appeared in several television programmes, including the children's television series My Parents Are Aliens and the ITV dramas Where The Heart Is, At Home with the Braithwaites and soap opera Emmerdale.

Metcalfe's breakthrough role occurred in 2006, when she was cast as Mercedes McQueen in the Channel 4 soap opera Hollyoaks. She had previously been considered for the role of Claire Devine before her character was created. Metcalfe was the first actress to be cast in the soap by executive producer Bryan Kirkwood.

Her role in Hollyoaks has led to her appearing in its late-night spin-off series Hollyoaks Later, first appearing in the first series in 2008. It was announced in April 2010 that she would return to the series for its third series later that year, and she continued in the role for series 4 and series 5. Despite the show concluding in 2013, a one-off special was broadcast in 2020, with Metcalfe returning once again in a main role.

On 19 December 2010, it was announced Metcalfe would take part in the sixth series of ITV winter sports competition Dancing on Ice. She was partnered with Sylvain Longchambon and was the seventh celebrity eliminated from the competition when she finished in the bottom two of the leaderboard along with fellow contestant Vanilla Ice, who was saved by the judging panel.

Metcalfe quit Hollyoaks in August 2014. Her character, Mercedes, appeared to have been killed off on 20 November, only to return unexpectedly in February 2015, alive after all, with Metcalfe back in the role on a permanent basis.

== Personal life ==
At the age of 15, her father died from bowel cancer, and Metcalfe stated that she was able to draw on her personal experiences for the role in Hollyoaks. Metcalfe was previously in a relationship with footballer Jermaine Pennant. She confirmed her first pregnancy in February 2017 to former Geordie Shore star Greg Lake. She gave birth to a son on 20 June 2017. Metcalfe and Lake split in 2020.

She co-owns the clothing rental boutique, The Closet, in Liverpool with Hollyoaks co-stars Claire Cooper and Leah Hackett, which opened in April 2010.

== Filmography ==
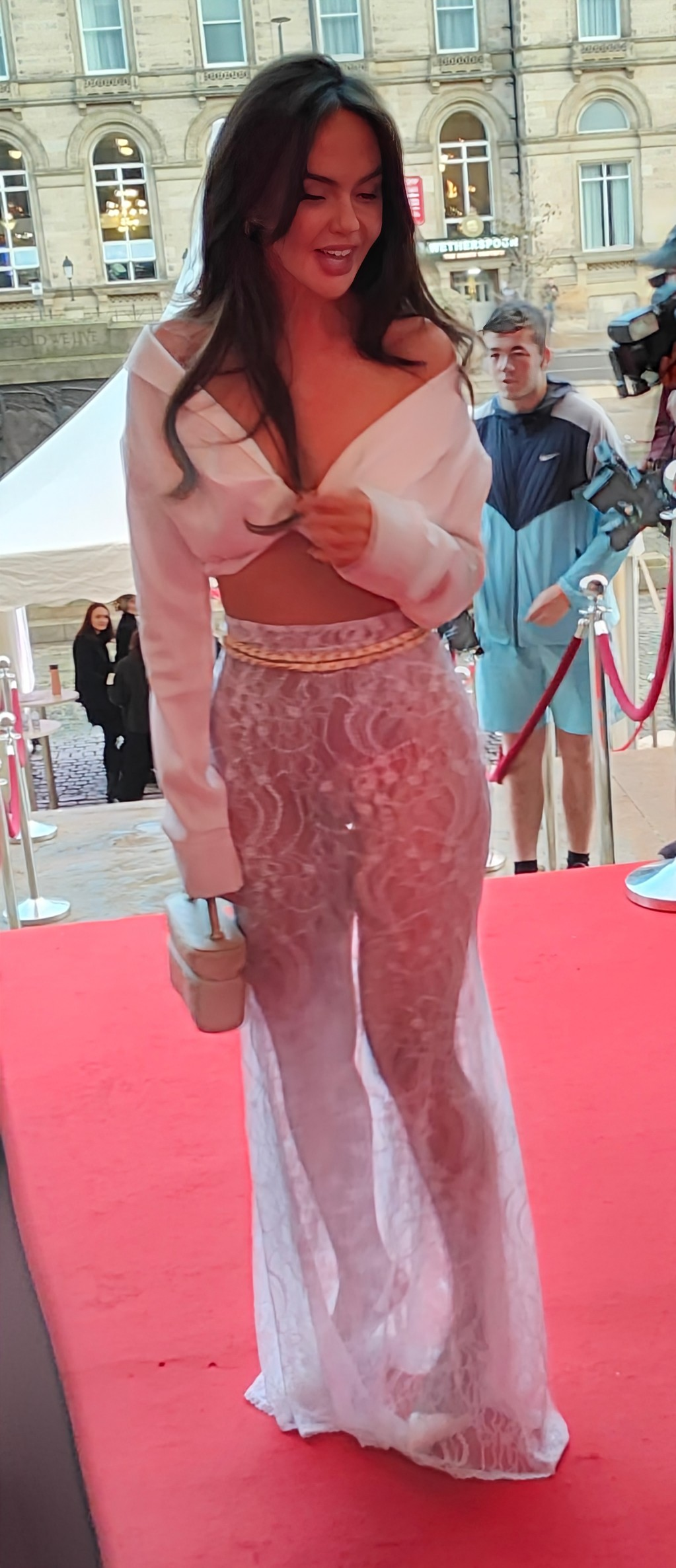
Metcalfe arriving at the Hollyoaks 30th Anniversary Party in 2025

Television
Year	Title	Role	Notes
1998, 2001	Where the Heart Is	Kelly / Geena Garton	3 episodes
1999	My Parents Are Aliens	Katie Roberts	1 episode
2001	At Home with the Braithwaites	School Bully 1	1 episode
2002	Emmerdale	Jade Nicholls	Recurring Role
2006–present	Hollyoaks	Mercedes McQueen	Regular Role
2008–2012, 2020	Hollyoaks Later	Mercedes McQueen	Main Cast Member
2011	Dancing on Ice	Contestant	
2015	Celebrity Juice	Panelist	
2016	Virtually Famous	Panellist	
2016	Extreme Makeovers: On Fleek	Narrator	
2025	Just Act Normal	Candy	BBC drama

Film
Year	Title	Role	Notes
2009	Birthday Girl	Keeley	TV movie

== Awards and nominations ==
Year	Award	Category	Series	Result	Ref.
2007	British Soap Awards	Sexiest Female	Hollyoaks	Longlisted	
2007	Inside Soap Awards	Best Bitch	Hollyoaks	Nominated	
2008	British Soap Awards	Sexiest Female	Hollyoaks	Longlisted	
2008	TV Now Awards	Ireland's Sexiest Star	Herself	Nominated	
2008	Inside Soap Awards	Sexiest Female	Hollyoaks	Nominated	
2008	Inside Soap Awards	Best Bitch	Hollyoaks	Nominated	
2009	All About Soap Awards	Best Celeb Style	Herself	Won	
2009	British Soap Awards	Sexiest Female	Hollyoaks	Longlisted	
2009	British Soap Awards	Best Actress	Hollyoaks	Longlisted	
2009	Inside Soap Awards	Sexiest Female	Hollyoaks	Nominated	
2009	TV Now Awards	Favourite Female Soap Star	Hollyoaks	Nominated	
2010	All About Soap Awards	Best Celeb Style	Herself	Nominated	
2010	All About Soap Awards	Fatal Attraction (with Ricky Whittle)	Hollyoaks	Nominated	
2010	British Soap Awards	Sexiest Female	Hollyoaks	Longlisted	
2010	British Soap Awards	Best Actress	Hollyoaks	Longlisted	
2010	Inside Soap Awards	Sexiest Female	Hollyoaks	Nominated	
2011	TRIC Awards	TV Soap Personality	Hollyoaks	Nominated	
2011	All About Soap Bubble Awards	Best Celeb Style	Herself	Nominated	
2011	British Soap Awards	Sexiest Female	Hollyoaks	Shortlisted	
2011	Inside Soap Awards	Best Actress	Hollyoaks	Longlisted	
2011	Inside Soap Awards	Sexiest Female	Hollyoaks	Shortlisted	
2012	British Soap Awards	Sexiest Female	Hollyoaks	Longlisted	
2012	British Soap Awards	Best Actress	Hollyoaks	Longlisted	
2012	Inside Soap Awards	Best Actress	Hollyoaks	Longlisted	
2012	Inside Soap Awards	Best Bitch	Hollyoaks	Shortlisted	
2012	Inside Soap Awards	Sexiest Female	Hollyoaks	Longlisted	
2013	Inside Soap Awards	Best Actress	Hollyoaks	Longlisted	
2013	Inside Soap Awards	Best Bitch	Hollyoaks	Longlisted	
2013	Inside Soap Awards	Sexiest Female	Hollyoaks	Shortlisted	
2014	National Television Awards	Serial Drama Performance	Hollyoaks	Longlisted	
2014	British Soap Awards	Sexiest Female	Hollyoaks	Shortlisted	
2014	British Soap Awards	Best On-Screen Partnership (with Joseph Thompson)	Hollyoaks	Nominated	
2014	Inside Soap Awards	Sexiest Female	Hollyoaks	Shortlisted	
2015	British Soap Awards	Best Actress	Hollyoaks	Longlisted	
2015	Inside Soap Awards	Sexiest Female	Hollyoaks	Won	
2016	British Soap Awards	Best Actress	Hollyoaks	Shortlisted	
2016	Inside Soap Awards	Best Actress	Hollyoaks	Longlisted	
2016	Inside Soap Awards	Sexiest Female	Hollyoaks	Shortlisted	
2016	TV Choice Awards	Best Soap Actress	Hollyoaks	Nominated	
2017	National Television Awards	Serial Drama Performance	Hollyoaks	Longlisted	
2018	Inside Soap Awards	Female Soap Superstar	Hollyoaks	Won	
2019	National Television Awards	Serial Drama Performance	Hollyoaks	Longlisted	
2019	Inside Soap Awards	Best Bad Girl	Hollyoaks	Shortlisted	
2020	National Television Awards	Serial Drama Performance	Hollyoaks	Longlisted	
2020	TRIC Awards	TV Soap Personality	Hollyoaks	Nominated	
2020	Inside Soap Awards	Best Actress	Hollyoaks	Shortlisted	
2022	National Television Awards	Serial Drama Performance	Hollyoaks	Longlisted	
2022	TRIC Awards	TV Soap Personality	Hollyoaks	Longlisted	
2022	Inside Soap Awards	Best Actress	Hollyoaks	Longlisted	
2023	National Film Awards	Best Actress in a TV Series	Hollyoaks	Won	
2023	TRIC Awards	TV Soap Personality	Hollyoaks	Longlisted	
2023	Inside Soap Awards	Best Actress	Hollyoaks	Longlisted	
2024	National Television Awards	Serial Drama Performance	Hollyoaks	Longlisted	
2025	National Television Awards	Serial Drama Performance	Hollyoaks	Pending	
2025	Inside Soap Awards	Best Show-stopper	Hollyoaks	Pending	
