= Hannah Ashworth =

Fictional character from Hollyoaks

- Hollyoaks character
- Portrayed by: Emma Rigby
- Duration: 2005–2010, 2024
- First appearance: 27 September 2005
- Last appearance: 8 July 2024
- Introduced by: David Hanson (2005); Hannah Cheers and Angelo Abela (2024)
- Book appearances: Truth or Dare
- Spin-off appearances: Hollyoaks Later (2009)
In-universe information
- Other names: Hannah Osborne (married name)
- Occupation: Escort; Model
- Family: Ashworth
- Father: Neville Ashworth
- Mother: Suzanne Ashworth
- Brothers: Josh Ashworth
- Half-brothers: Rhys Ashworth; JJ Osborne
- Half-sisters: Frankie Osborne
- Husband: Darren Osborne (2009–2011)
- Grandfathers: Bill Ashworth
- Uncles: Noel Ashworth
- First cousins: Jamie Fletcher; Beth Clement

Hannah Ashworth (also Osborne) is a fictional character from the British Channel 4 soap opera Hollyoaks, played by Emma Rigby. Hannah first appeared on-screen on 27 September 2005 and her last appearance was on 8 July 2024. It was announced on 8 November 2023 that she was to return after 13 years away for a number of episodes in early January, and was later announced to be making a permanent return. Hannah briefly returned for a short stint from 19 to 23 January 2024, before a permanent return on 26 April of the same year. Rigby quit the role once again, only one month after her permanent return, in June 2024.

The character was in a controversial storyline in which she developed anorexia nervosa and bulimia nervosa. The storyline attracted much attention from the press and won much critical acclaim for the writing and Rigby's performance. It also featured Hannah's best friend, Melissa Hurst (Carla Chases), dying as result of an eating disorder, which was a first for British soaps. Rigby won many different awards for her portrayal of the character, including Best Actress at the 2008 British Soap Awards.

== Creation ==
=== Background ===
The character of Hannah was part of a new family unit which was cast in the show called the Ashworths, who moved into the Hunter family's old home. Her parents are Neville and Suzanne and brothers Rhys and Josh. Hannah's storylines are initially fairly lighthearted, because while Hannah was supposed to be 16, actress Emma Rigby was herself still 15 and therefore subject to the UK child employment laws which limited her availability for filming.

=== Casting ===
Auditions were held for the part of Hannah and actress Emma Rigby went on to gain the part. During some of the storylines the actress commented that playing the character was sometimes depressing and tiring but had this to say about one of her storylines: "I just threw myself into it, really. I didn't want it to be unrealistic or disrespectful to people who suffer from the illness and I didn't want to glamorise it, either.

It was announced on 8 November 2008 that Rigby had decided to quit the show in order to pursue other projects, but her character would still be on-screen until June 2009. On 2 March 2009 it was announced that Rigby had extended her contract by a further six months after new producer Lucy Allen convinced her to stay with promises of a 'juicy' exit plotline. She was then scheduled to depart in December 2009. It was later confirmed she would leave early 2010.

== Development ==
=== Personality and identity ===
Once sunny and outgoing, tragedy has taken its toll on the character. Channel 4 publicity commented that the character's storylines are the factors which affected the character's self-esteem with putting up with the constant drama revolving around her family, being dumped by her boyfriend, and Grace Hutchinson's death all contributed to her developing the illness bulimia. Hannah later became much more confident and in control of her life. Hannah is also known to be slightly ditzy and sometimes spoiled.

=== Relationships ===
The character's first relationship came when a storyline saw her falling for her classmate John Paul McQueen. Their friends at the time Sarah and Craig, were also dating and set them up as a couple. Although at first the relationship appeared to be going well, John Paul was clearly uneasy and his hesitance made the relationship turbulent. When they eventually slept together, John Paul realised he did not want a relationship with Hannah and broke up with her. Hannah had no idea John Paul was actually struggling with his sexuality, which he attempted to conceal by pretending to be attracted to Sarah. At Hannah's 18th birthday party, John Paul tells Craig he is love with him and then runs off, leaving Hannah to ponder what is going with him. The following month, Hannah spotted John Paul and Craig sharing a drunken kiss. The character was reluctant to let John Paul go, until he finally admitted his sexuality, which left her devastated. In hope of reconciliation she remained friends with him. During this period she attempts to sabotage John Paul's new relationship with Spike. It was the breakup with John Paul that sent her into a spiral of bulimia and anorexia.

It was not until the character was on the road to recovery that she had a new on screen romance. Hannah started a relationship with Danny Valentine and their relationship was characterised by his frequent lack of tact in some issues. He also agreed to stand by her knowing she was fragile from her ordeal with eating disorders. The characters often broke up and reconciled but eventually they ended their relationship after Danny accused her of sleeping with Darren Osborne and then slept with Mercedes McQueen to get back at her.

Following the collapse of his relationship with Sarah Barnes, Elliot realised he and Hannah would be better suited. When Hannah decided to run for Student Entertainments Officer, Elliot rigged the vote in her favour. They later began dating, but Elliot soon exhibited sexual self-consciousness and avoided confronting the issue by spending more time with her father Neville, with whom he shared an interest in robots and rockets. Their relationship subsequently ended.

Hannah later had a brief relationship with a minor celebrity called Matt and Ash Roy later tried to win Hannah's affections. She was charmed by his good looks and his rich lifestyle. He took her to dinner with his sister Leila Roy and her boyfriend Justin Burton. It didn't go down to well when Justin and Ash had an argument. Hannah did not realise at the time that Justin was in love with her. However, she soon realised that it is Justin she liked not Ash and the pair shared a kiss which led Justin to break up with Leila the next day.

After a motorbike accident left Hannah fighting for her life, the blame was put on Justin. Unknown to Justin at the time, it was in fact Ash who had tampered with the bike, intending Justin to be riding it not Hannah. It was later revealed however by Leila that it was Ash who caused the accident. This led to Hannah breaking up with Ash and apologising to Justin. Although at first Justin didn't want to know as he couldn't forgive Hannah for thinking it was him that almost killed her, Hannah admitted her real feelings at a concert at the SU Bar where Mcfly were playing. Justin then told Hannah how he felt and the two finally got together and shared a kiss, which Ash saw and walked out.

Hannah admitted to Justin that she did have a relapse, but it was after the whole Ash hiding the food in her room incident. Justin then went on to be honest with Hannah and confessed his darkest secret to her, that he helped Warren bury Sean Kennedy's body.

Justin and Hannah finally get together, but someone burns down the loft with Warren and Hannah in it. Warren is seemingly killed (although returns for a later storyline) but Justin manages to rescue Hannah. They hope to be together but Justin is blamed for the fire and decides to make a run for it. Justin says he will leave with Hannah, but tricks her and leaves without her because he doesn't want her to suffer with a life on the run. Hannah is distraught.

Much later on Darren and Hannah get married on a drunken road trip. Hannah arrives home and refuses to divorce because she is so young. They later move in together and begin to look out for each other.

=== Return (2024) ===
On 8 November 2023, Hollyoaks announced the return of Hannah as Rigby had decided to reprise the role. Huge speculation surrounding Darren's off-screen twins came to light on 10 November when it was announced that Hall had reprised the role of Suzanne. It was announced Hannah, along with Suzanne and the twins would all return for a "huge storyline" surrounding Darren. She departed again in episode 6294, originally broadcast on 23 January 2024. It was later announced to be reprising the role permanently and viewers would see her return in spring 2024. It was mentioned that the production team were extremely happy Rigby was returning. It showed in the spring trailer for 2024 that Hannah would also return alongside boyfriend Robbie Roscoe (Charlie Wernham), who is pimping Hannah out. A notable client is Dave Chen-Williams (Dominic Power).

== Storylines ==
=== 2005–2010 ===
Hannah arrives in Hollyoaks with her parents, Neville (Jim Millea) and Suzanne (Suzanne Hall), and brothers Rhys (Andy Moss) and Josh (Sonny Flood). She plays pranks on Josh and their cousin Fletch by pretending to be the fabled Hollyoaks Beast. Hannah becomes friends with Sarah Barnes (Loui Batley) and Nancy Hayton (Jessica Fox). One night, Hannah and Nancy are babysitting Tony (Nick Pickard) and Mandy Hutchinson's (Sarah Jayne Dunn) daughter Grace, who dies from Sudden Infant Death Syndrome. Hannah is traumatised and guilt-ridden from the experience.

Hannah begins dating classmate, John Paul McQueen (James Sutton). Hannah falls in love with him and they lose their virginity to each other. Hannah is devastated when John Paul breaks up with her and is even more upset when she learns he has feelings for Sarah. Distraught by everything, Hannah binges on food and becomes sick. John Paul and Hannah later get back together, but then Hannah catches him kissing their friend, Craig Dean (Guy Burnet), at a school dance (Craig was actually the person John Paul had feelings for). In the heat of the moment, Hannah announces to everyone what she saw. Afterwards, Hannah tells John Paul they can just pretend the kiss never happened, but John Paul says they cannot and he has realised he is gay. Hannah is devastated and becomes convinced she "made" him gay because of how "repulsive" she is. Hannah develops bulimia and begins regularly binging and purging.

Hannah becomes friends with Sarah's model friend, Melissa Hurst. Under Melissa's influence, Hannah's bulimia turns into anorexia. Melissa, herself a bulimic turned anorexic, offers her some tips on how to starve herself and hide her disorder from others. All of Hannah's friends become suspicious of her weight loss and change in behaviour. Sarah misinterprets a conversation between Hannah and Melissa and believes that Hannah is taking drugs. Sarah tells Suzanne about Hannah's "drug use" and Suzanne confronts Hannah about Sarah's accusations. Hannah denies using drugs and is furious with Sarah for meddling in her life. Rhys's best friend, Gilly Roach (Anthony Quinlan), also becomes convinced that Hannah is taking drugs. Annoyed with Gilly's interference, Hannah threatens to falsely accuse him of sexually assaulting her if he does not keep his mouth shut.

The situation comes to a head when the Ashworths have a barbecue and Melissa refuses to let Hannah eat anything, causing Rhys to kick her out. Melissa collapses on the street and is rushed to hospital where she is put in intensive care. With Suzanne still convinced Hannah was taking drugs, Hannah lies to her mother that her recent behaviour was because Gilly had sexually assaulted her. However, the truth about Hannah's condition is finally revealed to her family. After days of abuse from Rhys and Josh, being hounded by Suzanne, and having her condition misunderstood by Neville, Hannah feels she needs to escape. She engineers a plot to escape the country with Melissa, who is worried that being force-fed while in the hospital will cause her to get fat. Hannah breaks Melissa out of hospital, but then Melissa collapses of a heart attack, brought on by lack of food and body abuse, and dies. Hannah cradles Melissa's lifeless body and cries hysterically.

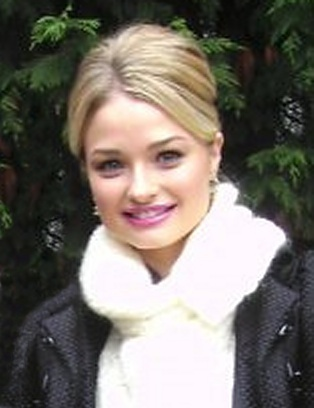
Emma Rigby (pictured) said it was a real honour to take part in such a "good" storyline.

Hannah finds it hard to move on from Melissa's death. Hannah tells everyone she is doing better, but her anorexia continues. Hannah hides it from her family by asking for food and then hiding it in her room. John Paul tries to be there for Hannah, but she lays into him for lying to her and tells him their break-up triggered her eating disorder. At the same time, Hannah admits to John Paul that she is still in love with him and that she hopes someone hurts him as badly as he hurt her. After Sarah finds out that Craig cheated on her with John Paul, Hannah tells her she knows exactly the pain she is in and the two women comfort each other.

Hannah is caught in the middle of an argument between Sarah and John Paul, during which she passes out. Both Suzanne and Sarah try to convince themselves it is a delayed reaction from her condition, after a search of her room initially finds no sign of hidden food. Later, after noticing the carpet has been pulled up, Suzanne discovers the rotting remains of food Hannah had been hiding under the floor boards. With her daughter's life on the line, Suzanne has Hannah sectioned under the Mental Health Act and healthcare workers arrive to take her to hospital. Hannah locks herself in her room, but is talked out by Rhys. Hannah gets treatment in an eating disorder unit and is deemed fit for release after two months. The Ashworths begin family therapy and Hannah is forced to confront the issues which led to her problems.

Hannah gets her life back on track and begins attending Hollyoaks Community College. She makes her peace with John Paul and they agree to be friends. She begins dating Danny Valentine and the two quickly become serious. Neville does not want Danny with his daughter and Hannah initially believes Neville is just being protective, but then she finds out it is actually because Danny is black. Hannah stands up for Danny and the two decide they truly want to be together. Danny wrongly believes that Hannah slept with Darren Osborne (Ashley Taylor Dawson) and in turn sleeps with Mercedes McQueen (Jennifer Metcalfe), which ends their relationship.

Elliot Bevan (Garnon Davies) develops feelings for Hannah. When Hannah decides to run for Student Entertainments Officer, Elliot rigs the vote in her favour. Hannah was furious when she finds out, but Elliot tells her he did it because he likes her. They begin dating, but Elliot has some sexual self-consciousness and avoids confronting the issue by spending more time with Neville, with whom he shares an interest in robots and rockets. This leads to their relationship subsequently ending.

Hannah takes a trip to the MTV Europe Music Awards where she meets Matt and briefly dates him. Hannah starts dating Ash Roy, who gives her many gifts. Hannah becomes attracted to Justin Burton (Chris Fountain) and Justin himself developed feelings for her. Justin and Ash compete for Hannah's affections. The two arrange a motorbike race. Hannah rides Justin's bike and crashes. Justin initially receives the blame for the accident until Leila and Justin expose Ash as being the one responsible because he had tampered with Justin's bike before the race. Consequently, Hannah dumps Ash and begins dating Justin. To get revenge, Ash hid food in Hannah's room to try to convince her family she was still ill. Hannah denies hiding the food, but admits she had a brief relapse with her bulimia, but she got herself back on track.

Hannah and Justin planned on running away together until the return of Clare Devine (Gemma Bissix). Clare sets fire to Warren Fox's (Jamie Lomas) nightclub The Loft. Clare was seen in many stunts taking place in the scenes. Hannah survived after Justin saved her whereas Warren died. Justin later received the blame for the fire and the pair tried to convince others that it was Clare who started the fire. Justin left Hollyoaks and left Hannah, believing it was what's best for her. Hannah's parents still did not believe her when she said she did not hide the food in her room which was planted by Ash, so she moved in with Nancy and Zoe Carpenter (Zoë Lister).

Still feeling down after her split with Justin, Hannah got drunk and met band member Stav who took both her and Darren on a weekend to Denmark. Upon returning, Darren revealed that the pair had in fact got married. They later agreed to get their marriage annulled. However, Cindy told Darren (with whom she was planning to con Tony out of his money) that being married to Hannah he could regain control of The Dog. After realising this, Darren raced to Hannah and convinced her to re-think the annulment. Darren and Hannah eventually slept together and Hannah thought that this could lead to a proper relationship. Darren let her down by telling her she's too sensible for him. In September 2009, Ash's sister Leila told Gilly it was Ash who planted the food in Hannah's room to make everyone think she had had a relapse. Consequently, Suzanne and Hannah had a heart to heart and Suzanne apologised.

Hannah, Rhys and Josh went away to a music festival. At the festival, she met Imogen, Kev and Jamie, drug dealers who groomed Hannah and Rhys into joining their gang. Hannah slept with Jamie and began to fall in love with him. However, when she discovered his drug dealing, Hannah tried to leave but he eventually convinced her to stay. That night, the pair shared an ecstasy tablet. Hannah found out Imogen was a prostitute, who Kev was using to get money. He then attacked Hannah and told her she would do the same in the future, causing Jamie to hit him and let Hannah escape. Hannah and Jamie drove off in his ice-cream van. Unbeknownst to them, Kev had hidden drugs in the van. Kev kidnapped Rhys and threatened to kill him if Hannah and Jamie did not return with his drugs. However, Jamie and Hannah returned without the drugs. Jamie lied to both Hannah and Kev saying he didn't have the drugs and this led to Kev threatening to kill Hannah with a gun to her head. Jamie had called Kev's bluff and Jamie and Hannah returned to the beach. Hannah eventually discovered the drugs in Jamie's bag and left him. She got onto a coach where she texted Sarah Barnes, unaware that she had died in her parachute jump as her girlfriend Lydia Hart (Lydia Kelly) unintentionally sabotaged her parachute. When she returned to the village, Mike told her of Sarah's death and she broke down in tears.

When Nancy's ex-husband Jake Dean (Kevin Sacre) returned from a psychiatric unit, he revealed that Hannah had been sending him letters. However, Hannah told Nancy she had only sent one, telling him to stay away. This led to a fall out with Nancy, but they made up when Hannah broke down during her speech at Sarah's funeral.

Whilst working at The Dog, Hannah catches Anita Roy being sick due to excessive alcohol consumption. However, Hannah believes Anita is bulimic. Wanting the attention, Anita deceives Hannah, making her believe she has an eating disorder. Hannah gives Anita her diary of when she was anorexic. This leads to an argument with Nancy and Leila. Feeling at her lowest, Hannah has to stop herself from binging. When Anita catches Hannah being sick, she feels guilty and confesses she made the illness up. Angry at this, Hannah tells Leila and Anita's brother Ravi (Stephen Uppal). Anita then informs Suzanne and Rhys about witnessing Hannah being sick, realising she has made her relapse. Hannah moves in with Darren following her family's interference and she starts to make herself sick. When Anita tries to tell Hannah to get help, she becomes angry, and throws her out. Darren catches her being sick and tells Rhys and Josh. Hannah later attacks him, before he tells her to leave the flat, which she does. Moving back in with her family, the Ashworths begin to become overprotective of Hannah. In order to convince them that nothing is wrong with her, Hannah gets Neville and Suzanne to take her to hospital, where the Ashworths are informed of her weight loss. Hannah then escapes the hospital. Darren finds her, as she is making plans to flee the country. When he realises his own family will not forgive him for several reasons, Darren steals money from Steph Cunningham (Carley Stenson) and tells Hannah he will leave with her.

During their time on the run from their families, Hannah collapses, and Darren questions whether she has eaten. Later on, she collapses again and seizures. Rhys and Josh discover Hannah and Darren's whereabouts when he calls them. An angry Hannah tells her brothers to leave as Darren calls an ambulance. Hannah is admitted into an eating disorder unit of the hospital, where she refuses to let her family believe she is ill. Later, she tells Darren she wants to die. Hannah slowly recovers in hospital and bonds with Zoe. She is relieved when doctors tell her she is well enough to leave. Hannah then makes a life changing decision to leave Hollyoaks and be independent. At first, her family refuses to let her go, thinking she is not ready and mature enough to go on her own. However, they think she would learn things in life, so they let her leave. Hannah goes to see Darren, and leaves him a present, telling him not to open it until after she has left. When he opens it he finds a photo of himself and Hannah, a message which says that he is the best husband ever and £5,000.

=== 2024 ===
In January 2024, Hannah surprises Darren by returning to Hollyoaks with her half-siblings and his children Frankie (Isabelle Smith) and JJ Osborne (Ryan Mulvey). Hannah reveals that Suzanne has money problems and cannot look after Frankie and JJ, and they are forced to stay with Darren. It is also revealed that Hannah is also in debt and has run away. Hannah is reconciled with John-Paul who she catches kissing Hollyoaks High headteacher, Carter Shepherd (David Ames). Hannah agrees to keep their kiss a secret since Carter is in the closet, but she overhears a conversation with Carter, revealing that he runs a gay conversion cult. Hannah confronts Carter, causing him to push her to the ground and leading to Hannah losing consciousness. Believing that he has killed her, Carter dumps Hannah’s body in the booth of the school van. She manages to escape and Carter offers her money in exchange for her silence. Suzanne also returns and is furious with Hannah for bringing Frankie and JJ to Hollyoaks without her consent. After an argument with Suzanne, Hannah takes Carter’s money and leaves Hollyoaks.

A few months later, Hannah returns and reveals herself as a sex worker, after being paid by Carter to have sex with Lucas Hay (Oscar Curtis), but then reveals to Lucas that she knows what Carter is doing. Carter later confronts her and she slaps him, before he leaves her gagged and bound. John Paul bursts into Carter's flat expecting to expose him for what he's been doing, but instead finds Hannah gagged and tied to a chair. He rescues her and she explains that Carter has kidnapped Lucas and is trying to take him to the United States before the two set off to rescue Lucas from Carter. The duo inform Lucas's dad, Ste Hay (Kieron Richardson) about what has been happening and he helps them rescue him. Later on, Carter is spotted walking through the village by Ste, John Paul and Hannah, and the three restrain him to the ground. After Carter is arrested by the police, Hannah meets with John Paul, Nancy, James Nightingale (Gregory Finnegan), Maxine Minniver (Nikki Sanderson) and Kitty Draper (Iz Hesketh) in The Dog in the Pond, where Hannah reveals to Nancy that she plans to stick around in the village for a while, and also reveals to Nancy, Maxine, Kitty, John Paul, James, Tony and Diane Hutchinson (Alex Fletcher) that she knew what Carter had been doing all along. But later that year, Hannah disappears, taking off in a taxi.

== Reception ==
Hannah's eating disorder storyline gained much press attention in part because it became the first British soap opera to feature a character dying on-screen from an eating disorder, with the death of Melissa Hurst. but was garnered with praise for showing the harsh realities of the disorders. With Rigby giving a message of advice stating:

Anyone who feels pressure to look a certain a way, it's not real life, and it is a soap, and they shouldn’t concentrate on trying to look a certain way but being happy and healthy with themselves".

Disordered Eating, a website dedicated to the awareness of eating disorders said that the characters storylines had succeeded in raising awareness and provoking much discussion of the huge problem of eating disorders. Rigby has won numerous awards for her portrayal of Hannah and the storylines given, including Best Actress at The British Soap Awards 2008, and another from The Mental Health Awards. Different media sources reported the character is the only one to raise the issue of eating disorders and size zero, stating that Hollyoaks were not afraid to do so and praising the team for using the character to break the ground.
