= Suzanne Ashworth =

Fictional character from Hollyoaks

- Hollyoaks character
- Portrayed by: Suzanne Hall
- Duration: 2005–2012, 2024
- First appearance: 30 September 2005
- Last appearance: 11 September 2024
- Introduced by: David Hanson (2005); Paul Marquess (2011); Emma Smithwick (2012); Hannah Cheers and Angelo Abela (2024)
In-universe information
- Occupation: Nurse (2005–2010); Pub Landlady (2008–2010)
- Half-sisters: Nikki Fletcher
- Husband: Neville Ashworth
- Sons: Rhys Ashworth; Josh Ashworth; JJ Osborne
- Daughters: Hannah Ashworth; Frankie Osborne
- Granddaughters: Katy O'Connor; Phoebe McQueen (adoptive)
- Nephews: Jamie Fletcher

Suzanne Ashworth is a fictional character from the British Channel 4 soap opera Hollyoaks, played by Suzanne Hall. She made her first on-screen appearance on 30 September 2005. Suzanne was introduced by series producer David Hanson as part of the Ashworth family. In February 2010, Suzanne was axed from the serial by new series producer Paul Marquess. Suzanne made her final appearance on 14 July 2010. Marquess stated in an interview that he was a big fan of Hall's work in the serial. In late 2010 it was revealed that Hall had returned to filming and Suzanne would be pregnant with twins. Suzanne's storylines have included trying to keep her family together, fathering a son Rhys Ashworth secretly with another man, other affairs and a feud with Kathy Barnes (Sarah Jane Buckley). Suzanne returned to Hollyoaks on 14 January 2011 for a period of 2 months. In 2012 it was announced that Hall had reprised the role once again. It was announced in November 2023, that Hall would be reprising the role once again and would be returning "for the foreseeable" with her return scenes airing on 23 January 2024. Suzanne was killed-off in the episode broadcast on 11 September 2024.

== Casting ==
Suzanne was created in 2005 as part of the Ashworth family by David Hanson, actress Suzanne Hall was cast into the role. In early 2010, it was announced that Allan had stepped down from the position of executive producer and that Paul Marquess had taken over the role. It was soon revealed that Marquess planned to give Hollyoaks a "shake up", changing the productions team and beginning a cast cull by axing the entire remaining Ashworth family apart from Rhys Ashworth (Andrew Moss). The move was part of his reinvention of the serial and clearing out the "deadwood". Marquess later revealed he axed the Ashworths because he believed The Dog should have a lively family at the heart of it, that the Ashworths had become grim because of their hard hitting storyline, but added it was a shame because he is a "huge fan of Hall's work on Hollyoaks".

== Development ==
=== Introduction and characterisation ===
Suzanne has been described as always trying to hold her family together. In 2007 Hall stated that Suzanne was unhappy adding: "I have to look really miserable all the time at the moment. I hope soon she can have some happiness in her life, maybe even have an affair." She also added that Suzanne is "downtrodden and bored". Suzanne has been seen struggling to cope with daughter Hannah Ashworth's (Emma Rigby) anorexia battle, of the filming Hall states: "The anorexia scenes with Hannah were so sad. We were crying for hours at a time and the tears were real. I think moreso for me because I have a daughter who is the same age."

=== Returns in 2011–2012 ===
In December 2010, it was confirmed that Suzanne would return to Hollyoaks in 2011. In 2011 Suzanne returns and her storyline sees her pregnant with twins. Speaking Suzanne's return Ashley Taylor Dawson who plays Suzanne's old lover Darren Osborne stated: "she says, 'It's twins and they're yours'. At first, he doesn't believe her and he thinks it's a wind-up. The dates match up. It's a huge shock. But when she threatens to go back to Spain, he realises it's not what he wants and he stops her. He decides to man up and be a dad to his kids." On 3 December 2012, Daniel Kilkelly from Digital Spy announced that Suzanne would return to Hollyoaks in a guest capacity that month.

=== Return 2024 ===
On 8 November 2023, Hollyoaks announced the return of Hannah as Rigby had decided to reprise the role. Huge speculation surrounding Darren's off-screen twins came to light on 10 November when it was announced that Hall had reprised the role of Suzanne, originally announced on 9 November 2023. It was announced Hannah, along with Suzanne and the twins would all return for a "huge storyline" surrounding Darren.

== Storylines ==
=== 2005–2012 ===
After her son Josh and nephew, Fletch (Sam Darbyshire) were involved in a car crash after a joy ride she treated Amy Barnes (Ashley Slanina-Davies) and found out she was pregnant. She told Amy to tell one of her parents about the baby, but Amy was reluctant. When Amy started seeing her son Josh she warned her away from him, because she was worried Josh wouldn't be able to handle having to look after someone else's child.

It was revealed during a stay of her brother-in-law, Noel Ashworth, that she has had an affair with him, and that in fact, Noel is her eldest son Rhys' father, not her husband, Neville. When the family find this out, they are shocked, and Hannah and Josh start to treat her like a stranger.

After returning from a holiday in France, Suzanne began to worry about Hannah and her friendship with Melissa Hurst (Carla Chases) Suzanne thinks that Hannah is under the influence of drugs from Melissa because she doesn't know that Hannah is actually suffering from anorexia nervosa, and bans Melissa from the house. When Hannah accuses Gilly of sexually abusing her, Suzanne believes her at first, but beings to grow suspicious of her story when Gilly tries to explain what really is happening. Suzanne finally realised the truth about Hannah's anorexia when she broke into Hannah's room and found her hidden food, and her food diary. Suzanne felt guilty for not figuring it out quicker and tries to comfort an unwilling Hannah.

When Hannah helps Melissa escape from hospital, it all goes wrong and things do not go quite as planned. They plan to run away together, miles from home. But when they go to the Ashworth's to retrieve Hannah's passport, they get caught out by a shocked Josh. Hannah tells Josh not to tell Suzanne, but he called for Suzanne. When he calls Suzanne, she tries to stop them both from running away. Although they nearly got away with it, Melissa suddenly has an unexpected heart attack and collapses on the floor. Suzanne tries to resuscitate Melissa, but she was too late.

After Melissa's death, Suzanne was determined to see Hannah recover from her illness. When Hannah faints one day in her room, whilst Sarah Barnes (Loui Batley) and John Paul McQueen (James Sutton) are having an argument about Craig Dean (Guy Burnet), Suzanne searches Hannah's room to find out where she has been hiding her food. She discovers a pile of rotting food under a floorboard in Hannah's room and feels helpless that she is unable to help her daughter and decides that Hannah must be admitted to hospital to receive professional help to recover from her illness, so she is sectioned.

In late May 2009, Suzanne, Neville, Rhys and Josh assumed that Hannah had taken a relapse over her eating disorder. Ash Roy (Junade Khan), who was jealous after Hannah dumped him for Justin Burton (Chris Fountain), planted food in Hannah's room to make it look like she was hiding food and had in fact had a relapse, although he admitted to Hannah he had done it so her family would think Justin is not good for her and is causing the 'relapse'. The Ashworths attempted to stop Hannah seeing Justin. Hannah got Ash to come to her house and admit to Suzanne and Nev that he had put the food in the room, however he told them he never did it and he was worried for Hannah's mental well-being. After Justin left Hollyoaks, Hannah moved out of The Dog and moved in with Nancy Hayton (Jessica Fox), knowing she could not live with her family who thought she was ill and did not believe her. However things went from bad to worse, when the whole family discovers that Hannah had drunkenly married Darren. Suzanne tries to push Hannah into getting an annulment. However, this pushes her more towards Darren and the pair stay married. Nev and Suzanne's teenage godson Duncan Button (Dean Aspen) comes to stay with her the Ashworths. Hannah relapses and ends up back in hospital. She recovers and later leaves the village on her own with the Ashworths' support.

Suzanne is horrified when Josh is involved in a car crash then arrested for drink driving after Rhys spiked his drink. She is angry with her son thinking he should know better even though he protests his innocence. Suzanne and Neville do not believe him. When Josh's life deteriorates, Suzanne begins to support her son although this causes arguments with Neville who has disowned him. Whilst having her birthday dinner, Suzanne is shocked in disbelief that Neville reports Josh to the police, after Josh punches him. Josh is sent to prison for a few weeks for a second drink driving offense.

At Calvin (Ricky Whittle) and Carmel Valentine's (Gemma Merna) wedding, Suzanne sleeps with Darren. Suzanne later embarked on an affair with Darren, until Rhys catches them outside Darren's flat. Rhys tells Neville who then kicks Suzanne out of The Dog. She then moved in with Darren, temporarily, alongside Cindy and Holly. Neville forgives Suzanne and they reconcile and move to Spain.

Suzanne returns in January and meets Nancy and Darren in the pub. She tells them that Neville is divorcing her because she is pregnant with Darren's twins. A few days later, Suzanne gives birth to twins Jack and Francine during the opening of Tony Hutchinson's (Nick Pickard) spa. Her and the twins then move in with Darren. Suzanne later gets roped into a failed money-making scheme by Darren and Duncan. Cindy Hutchinson (Stephanie Waring) returns and offers Suzanne £100,000 to go back to Spain so that she can have Darren to herself. Suzanne offers to go if she doubles the money, which she does, and Suzanne leaves for Spain, taking Francine and Jack with her leaving Darren heartbroken. Suzanne returns the following year to attend Rhys's funeral and informs Darren that the twins are doing fine and that they are beginning to talk. Suzanne returns to Spain after the funeral.

=== 2024 ===
Suzanne returns to Hollyoaks in January 2024, furious with Hannah for taking her twin children, now nicknamed JJ (Ryan Mulvey) and Frankie (Isabelle Smith), to Hollyoaks to see Darren without her permission. They have an argument which causes Hannah to leave. Suzanne decides that she wants to take JJ and Frankie back with her to Manchester, but she is persuaded by Darren to stay, so that he can bond with the twins. Suzanne causes problems between Darren and Nancy, and after a fight with Frankie, she moves in with Pearl Anderson (Dawn Hope) who also employs her at Price Slice. She has a brief fling with Ethan Williams (Matthew James-Bailey).
