= List of Hollyoaks characters introduced in 2007 =

The following is a list of characters that first appeared in the Channel 4 soap opera Hollyoaks in 2007, by order of first appearance.

== Father Raymond ==
Father Raymond
- Hollyoaks character
- Portrayed by: Colin Connor
- Duration: 2007–2008
- First appearance: 6 April 2007
- Last appearance: 16 September 2008

Father Raymond is the Catholic Priest that first appeared to console Myra McQueen (Nicole Barber-Lane) over the anguish she felt about her gay son John Paul McQueen (James Sutton). He also helped prepare for the double wedding of Russ Owen (Stuart Manning) and Mercedes McQueen (Jennifer Metcalfe) and Dominic Reilly (John Pickard) and Tina McQueen (Leah Hackett), he also took confession from Mercedes about her affair with Warren Fox (Jamie Lomas). He is a priest at St. Paul's Catholic Church. Father Raymond reappears when Kieron Hobbs (Jake Hendriks) chose to leave his position in the church and told him that he must do what is right for him. Father Raymond then took over again from Kieron and started working at a new Catholic Church, St. Timothy's, it was here that he performed the wedding of Carmel McQueen (Gemma Merna) and Calvin Valentine (Ricky Whittle). Father Raymond then returned to perform Tina's funeral service. He is due to reappear again for the funeral of Warren. Father Raymond is Irish and appears to be mostly bemused by the McQueens antics.

== Leah Barnes ==
Leah Barnes
- Hollyoaks character
- Portrayed by: Magic Hurst (2007); Jessica Croft-Lane (2007–2011); Ela-May Demircan (2011–2024); Charlotte Alex Riley (2026–)
- Duration: 2007–2024, 2026–
- First appearance: Episode 1982; 27 February 2007
- Introduced by: Bryan Kirkwood (2007); Paul Marquess (2011); Hannah Cheers (2026)
In-universe information
- Occupation: Student
- Father: Billy Parker
- Mother: Amy Barnes
- Adoptive father: Ste Hay
- Stepfather: Doug Carter; John Paul McQueen; Harry Thompson; Ryan Knight; James Nightingale
- Half-brothers: Lucas Hay
- Half-sisters: Hannah Hay-O'Connor (adoptive)
- Sons: James Barnes
- Grandfathers: Mike Barnes; Danny Lomax (adoptive)
- Grandmothers: Kathy Barnes
- Aunts: Sarah Barnes; Leela Lomax (adoptive); Tegan Lomax (adoptive)
- First cousins: Peri Lomax; Dee Dee Hutchinson (adoptive); Daniel Lomax (adoptive)
- Other relatives: Steph Cunningham-Lomax (adoptive)

Leah Barnes, played by Ela-May Demircan from 2011 to 2024, is the daughter of Amy Barnes (Ashley Slanina-Davies). Leah is initially believed to be Ste Hay (Kieron Richardson)'s daughter however this turns out to be a man called Billy Parker – she is raised by Ste regardless of her paternity. Leah debuted when she was born on-screen in episode 1982, originally broadcast on 27 February 2007. On 24 March 2026, it was announced that Leah would be returning to the show with the role recast to actress Charlotte Alex Riley. Riley spoke of her casting: "It feels like a dream to be joining Hollyoaks. I'm looking forward to viewers seeing a new side to Leah Barnes."

=== Reception ===
In June 2017, Demircan was nominated for Best Young Actor at the British Soap Awards. In August 2017, she was longlisted for Best Young Actor at the Inside Soap Awards. She made the viewer-voted shortlist. Demircan lost out to Alfie Clarke, who portrays Arthur Thomas in Emmerdale. She was later nominated for "Best Young Performer" in the Radio Times soap awards 2024..

=== Storylines ===
After discovering her pregnancy, her mother Amy Barnes (Ashley Slanina-Davies) initially wants to have an abortion, but eventually opts for a state of denial, with only Michaela McQueen (Hollie-Jay Bowes) aware she is pregnant. In February 2007, she gives birth to Leah on the kitchen floor, with her shocked father Mike Barnes (Tony Hirst) and sister Sarah Barnes (Loui Batley) delivering Leah. Amy refuses to go near Leah, leading her mother Kathy Barnes (Sarah Jane Buckley) to claim she is Leah's mother. This ruse continues for several months, but finally Michaela sells the story to a tabloid. By this time, Amy has formed a bond with Leah, and claims Leah as her own. However, Kathy has become obsessed with Leah and, after failing to make Amy look incapable of being a mother, she kidnaps Leah. She is eventually sectioned and leaves the village a few months later.

Leah moves into a flat with Amy and boyfriend Ste Hay (Kieron Richardson). Amy tells her family that Ste is Leah's father. After Amy and Ste discover they are in serious money trouble, Ste lies that Leah has leukaemia in order to get money. The lie quickly spirals out of his control as Ste and Amy begin raking in money as. Eventually, the truth does come out. Amy's friend Sasha Valentine (Nathalie Emmanuel) babysits Leah one night. However, drug dealer Nige Foster (Sam Townend) arrives and persuades Sasha to take drugs, despite Leah's presence. Amy and Ste return home to find Leah crying on her own, and close to a syringe. An angry Ste throws both Sasha and Nige out after threatening them. Ste's anger issues grow out of hand, and on various occasions, he attacks Amy, who briefly moves out of the flat with Leah. Amy later discovers she is pregnant and has a son Lucas Hay. She, however, does not take Ste back. Following Lucas's birth, Amy suffers from postnatal depression and moves away, leaving Leah and Lucas with Ste. She returns months later. Amy, Leah and Lucas move back in with Ste, but Amy and Ste do not get back together.

Gabby Sharpe (Phina Oruche) pays Amy to babysit her daughter Amber Sharpe (Lydia Lloyd-Henry). Amy takes Leah and Lucas to Gabby's flat and on the same night, an arsonist sets fire to Il Gnosh, which is below the flat. Amy falls asleep as the fire spreads, however wakes up and realises she is trapped. She eventually attracts the attention of Steph Cunningham (Carley Stenson) outside. Steph enters and manages to save them with the help of her husband Gilly Roach (Anthony Quinlan), although Steph dies in the fire. On Leah's 5th birthday, she bonds with Amy's new boyfriend Ally as does Lucas.

In August 2012, Leah, along with Amy and Lucas, leaves the village and Ste. She returns in November 2012 as a bridesmaid for Ste's wedding to Doug Carter (PJ Brennan). When Leah is playing outside the wedding venue she runs across the road only to get nearly ran over by a minibus driven by Maddie Morrison (Scarlett Bowman). She swerves to avoid Leah, but although Ste manages to save her he is hit by the minibus. In December 2012, Leah is bullied at school for having Ste and Doug as her two fathers, but Ste explains to her that its ok to have him and Doug, as she has Amy as well. Shortly after this, Leah's biological father Billy Parker (Michael Parr) turns up in the village and vows to Ste that he will get Leah. Ste then tells Leah that Amy must never find out that he and his ex-boyfriend Brendan Brady (Emmett J. Scanlan) are together, and that he is still with Doug. Shortly after, Amy returns to the village in February 2013 and after discovering Ste's relationship with Brendan, she then leaves once more with Leah and Lucas, leaving Ste upset. Ste and Brendan later try to get custody of Leah and Lucas.

Leah takes a locket belonging to deceased Anna Blake (Saskia Wickham) that had been put in the vent outside the flat of Martha Kane (Carli Norris) and later returns it telling Martha that she had seen Anna's son Will Savage (James Atherton) getting out of his wheelchair and putting it in a vent, revealing Will as Anna's killer. Amy brings Leah and Lucas back to the village throughout November to December 2014 as Ste has a drug addiction.

After Ste is back from rehab he goes to a pub, but sees his stepfather Terry Hay (Conor Ryan) with Amy, Leah and Lucas. This is bad for him as Terry use to beat him and his mother Pauline Hay (Jane Hogarth). After that he walked away from a fight with Terry so Amy lets him see Leah and Lucas.

In 2014, Leah's adoptive father Ste Hay marries his current partner John Paul McQueen. They later separate after John Paul McQueen discovers that Ste has fathered a child with Sinéad O'Connor. Leah goes on to have another adoptive half sister Hannah Hay-O'Connor.

In March 2017, Amy was killed by her husband Ryan Knight (Duncan James), after discovering the truth about his sexual orientation, Leah and Lucas are cared for by Ryan and his girlfriend and Ste's sister Tegan Lomax (Jessica Ellis). Leah discovers that Ryan is gay and is having an affair with Ste. Leah tells Ste's sister Leela Lomax (Kirsty-Leigh Porter), causing everyone to know. But also, Ryan is revealed to have killed Amy, and when is caught, Leah is very confused and sad.

In 2018, Leah's adoptive father Ste has a short lived marriage to Harry Thompson they later separated and divorce after Harry has an affair and is later murdered.

In 2021, Leah goes to Trish Minniver's (Denise Welch) dance academy and Ste becomes Trish's cleaner. In October 2021, she develops a crush on DeMarcus Westwood (Tomi Ade), however judging by his facial expressions, the feelings are not mutual.

In 2023, Her adoptive father Ste marries partner James Nightingale and they move in alongside James's son Romeo and half-Sister Juliet.

In 2024, Leah's stepfather James dies in an explosion and which leaves Ste in a coma for 12 months. During this time Leah becomes a mother.

== Aleksander Malota ==
Aleksander Malota
- Hollyoaks character
- Portrayed by: Jon Lolis
- Duration: 2007–2008
- First appearance: 5 March 2007
- Last appearance: 2 July 2008
In-universe information
- Wife: Jacqui McQueen (2007–2008)

Aleksander "Alek" Malota was an Albanian immigrant, first appeared when Davey Thomas arranged for him to marry Jacqui McQueen so that he could stay in the United Kingdom. Despite Jacqui's reluctance he was determined to see it through for the sake of his family in Albania.

There was an attraction between Aleksander and his sister-in-law Carmel McQueen who started an affair, with a reluctant Jacqui's acquiescence. The affair was discovered by her brother John Paul McQueen and their mother Myra McQueen. The fall-out from this discovery lead to the uncovering of the marriage arrangement, adding to Myra's fury and disgust, with Myra slapping Alek around the face. Although very sceptical, Myra quietly agreed. In May, when Tony Hutchinson stopped by for dinner, her accidentally spilt gravy on Carmel's shirt, leading Aleksander to realise Carmel had breast implants. He harshly judged her for using money on such a frivolous purchase, and his fury only grew when he learned she'd stolen the money. Carmel and Aleksander briefly broke up, but Jacqui told Aleksander he never would have met Carmel if not for her taking the money, and convinced him to give Carmel a break.

A few months later, Jacqui lost her baby, and Tony beat up Alek as he was the one receiving sympathy and being able to grieve. Tony announced to the shocked onlookers in the Dog that the baby was in fact Tony's. Jacqui asked Alek to go back to Albania and he agreed. When Carmel found out she was shocked and begged him to stay. Alek agreed to stay, and he and Carmel slept together. When Carmel went out to the chip shop, she came back to find that Alek had gone, leaving her a note, saying " I will always love you. A xxx "

Alek returned for a short period in July 2008, when Carmel agrees to help him, arousing Calvin Valentine's suspicions.

== Spike ==
Spike
- Hollyoaks character
- Portrayed by: Tom Vaughan
- Duration: 2007–2008
- First appearance: 23 March 2007
- Last appearance: 28 November 2008

Spike was a character portrayed by actor Tom Vaughan from March 2007 to August 2007, with a brief return at the end of November 2008.

Spike was first seen DJing at the reception for Jacqui Malota and Aleksander Malota. He soon befriended Jacqui's gay brother, John Paul McQueen. John Paul was still not confident in his sexuality, but Spike was not only openly gay, he said his father was also gay and lived with a man named Simon.

Once John Paul got up the courage to ask Spike out on a date, they became very close very quickly. Spike was good-natured, but also wasn't afraid to stand his ground, especially when John Paul's ex Hannah Ashworth interfered with a date. On another occasion, Hannah told Spike about John Paul's feelings for his straight best friend, Craig Dean. Spike became jealous and when John Paul tried to tell him how much he cared, Spike told him he was being too serious and that he didn't "do" serious. Spike was in the middle of a DJing gig at the Dog and tried to tune John Paul out. When John Paul turned the volume on his amp down, Spike warned him to never do that again and passionately kissed him in front of everyone. This seemed to strengthen his relationship with John Paul, and he even managed to charm John Paul's sister Mercedes and mother Myra when he finally went to their house for a visit.

John Paul had never slept with a man before and was nervous about taking the next step. One day while the McQueen house was empty, Spike took John Paul to his bedroom and they slept together for the first time. This was the high point of their relationship, as the happier they became, the more upset this made Craig. Craig slept with John Paul and although John Paul tried to continue seeing Spike, he eventually dumped him, not telling Spike the real reason why.

Spike and John Paul remained friends, and when John Paul needed Spike to help him retrieve a poison pen letter he'd written to Craig's mother while Craig was on holiday with his girlfriend (again not telling Spike the truth), Spike did. They sparred with Hannah and her new friend Melissa, and Melissa responded by throwing John Paul's records in the water. Spike and John Paul fished them out and went back to John Paul's place, where they kissed and would have gone further if John Paul hadn't stopped. Spike advised him to sort out what was going on in his head and have some fun.

A few weeks later Spike began bartending at The Dog and quickly realized John Paul and Craig were involved. Spike began teasing Craig, and their increasingly hostile exchanges roused Sarah's suspicions. Craig played on John Paul's sense of chivalry and John Paul convinced Spike to keep quiet.

Spike made a brief return in November 2008. His tensions with Hannah had not gone away. Working as a reporter for the Chester Herald, Spike wanted to do a story on the Dog, or as Neville Ashworth had renamed it, The Jolly Roger. The nautically themed opening night, complete with young men wearing sailor suits, led Spike to write an article which sold the pub as a gay bar. When Neville realised what was going on, he was shocked, even more so when Spike jokingly pretended that he believed Neville was gay. Neville barred him from the pub, but he'd already booked Spike as a DJ. Finally, Neville had enough, fired Spike, and decided to change the pub back to The Dog in the Pond.

== Tristan Burgess ==
Tristan Burgess
- Hollyoaks character
- Portrayed by: William Rushton
- Duration: 2007–2008
- First appearance: 24 April 2007
- Last appearance: 7 May 2008
In-universe information
- Mother: Yasmin Burgess

Tristan Christopher Anthony Burgess was a rival of Tom Cunningham's from school. He was mentioned by other characters from as early as March 2005. In Spring 2007, Sam "O.B." O'Brien invited Tristan and his mother Yasmin over to the flat, not realising who Tristan was. Tristan was a vegan and Yasmin specifically gave orders not to let him have anything with bread or meat, but while she was on a date with O.B., Max let Tristan have a burger. Later that year, when Max's new girlfriend Steph was throwing a party for her new foster brother, she invited some of Tom's schoolmates so he wouldn't feel left out, unaware Tristan and Tom weren't exactly friends.

== Yasmin Burgess ==
Yasmin Burgess
- Hollyoaks character
- Portrayed by: Lauren Varnfield
- Duration: 2007–2008
- First appearance: 23 April 2007
- Last appearance: 7 May 2008
In-universe information
- Sons: Tristan Burgess

Yasmin Burgess was a woman who Sam "O.B." O'Brien developed an interest in after giving her a questionnaire for a new business plan. She was a single parent, as were O.B. and Max Cunningham. O.B. went out on a date with her, leaving her son Tristan at home with Max and Tom, but Yasmin was more interested in talking about the evils of bread and the importance of exercise than in any romantic inclinations. Yasmin was very upset to learn Tristan had eaten a hamburger. When she asked O.B. if he wanted to go out again, he declined.

== Graham Carpenter ==
Graham Carpenter
- Hollyoaks character
- Portrayed by: Paul Clarkson
- Duration: 2007–2009
- First appearance: 28 May 2007
- Last appearance: 3 December 2009
In-universe information
- Wife: Christine Carpenter
- Sons: Archie Carpenter
- Daughters: Zoe Carpenter

Graham Carpenter is Zoe and Archie Carpenter's father. After her ordeal at the hands of Will Hackett, Zoe left to be with her parents, but a few weeks later returned to HCC long enough to gather her belongings. The next day, her father showed up while she was playing around with Zak and demanded Zak get away from her. After a talk with Zak, and a look at some of the photos Zoe had taken of fun times with her friends, Graham convinced her to stay at HCC. He returned in May 2008 to see Zoe was now involved with a much older man, Mike.

On 11 June 2009, Graham returned to wish Zoe good luck after hearing she had been accepted for university. He gave Zoe and Archie two cheques for one thousand pounds each, which Zoe, who had stolen her film script from Mike, felt guilty about taking. After Zoe's Film Studies lecturer, Adrian, offered to let the plagiarism pass if she would sleep with him, she sat alone crying and ripped up the cheque. On 26 June, he arrived with his wife Christine for Zoe's graduation. Graham and Christine gave Zoe a necklace, unaware she had failed her degree. Adrian approached Zoe, Graham, Christine and Archie and told Zoe she should tell her parents. Graham and Christine were disappointed but forgave her.

In October 2009, Graham returned to visit Zoe in prison after see was charged with Sarah Barnes' murder. He later appeared at her court case.

== Noel Ashworth ==
Noel Ashworth
- Hollyoaks character
- Portrayed by: Craig Cheetham
- First appearance: 5 June 2007
- Last appearance: 28 June 2007
In-universe information
- Family: Ashworth
- Father: Bill Ashworth
- Brothers: Neville Ashworth
- Sons: Rhys Ashworth
- Daughters: Beth Clement
- Nephews: Josh Ashworth
- Nieces: Hannah Ashworth

Noel Ashworth was the brother of Neville Ashworth. When he arrived in Hollyoaks, he caused friction in the Ashworth household by announcing that he was the real father of Rhys Ashworth, after having an affair with Neville's wife Suzanne Ashworth 20 years ago. He also announced that he was going suffering from liver cancer, and only had a few months to live. Despite this, he continued to drink and smoke.

During his time there, he also told Rhys that he was leaving for Glasgow, and asked whether he would like to come with him or stay in Hollyoaks. Rhys decided to stay, and Noel announced that he would never return to Hollyoaks. Noel died on 16 October 2007, and it was revealed at his wake that he had a daughter, Beth Clement, who was in a relationship with Rhys at the time.

== Melissa Hurst ==
Melissa Hurst
- Hollyoaks character
- Portrayed by: Carla Chases
- First appearance: 7 June 2007
- Last appearance: 3 September 2007
- Introduced by: Bryan Kirkwood

Melissa Hurst was originally a friend to Sarah Barnes, whom she met when the two worked together on a modelling shoot. Through Sarah, Melissa met and grew close to Hannah Ashworth after discovering she is bulimic, an illness which Melissa also suffered from. Melissa helped Hannah to be subtle and hide her eating disorder, encouraging her to exercise regularly, go without food and to stay away from her family and friends so that she is not 'tempted' by food or alcohol – even persuading Hannah to stay at home when her family went to France.

This period of the Ashworths being in France, leaving their house to Hannah and Gilly for the duration saw Melissa become a central character in the show's plot. Melissa spent almost the whole of this time living at the Ashworths claiming she didn't want to go home, as her Mum would have forced her to eat. Hannah promised that she and Melissa would get through bulimia together and the girls soon started an extreme work out regime drinking only water and eating very little. Melissa had difficulties with Gilly Roach who thought she and Hannah were taking drugs because of the change in Hannah's personality, a fear also shared by her friends Sarah, Nancy Hayton and John Paul McQueen whose suspicions were reinforced when Sarah overheard Hannah and Melissa in the SU bar's toilets about "disposing of the evidence" and later the same evening, Hannah passing out.

Upon the return of the Ashworths from France, Hannah's mother Suzanne Ashworth was concerned as to how skinny Hannah had become. Melissa sarcastically stated that she had given Hannah drugs, resulting in Melissa being banned from the house. Melissa though continued to visit Hannah, angering Gilly. Hannah and Melissa threatened to say he had raped Hannah if he spoke out against Melissa. In spite of these threats, Gilly alerted Rhys Ashworth to his concerns about Melissa and she was forcibly ejected from the Ashworth's barbecue. Melissa had complained about a headache during the barbecue and continued to feel unwell as, after being ejected, she and Hannah stood in the rain waiting for a taxi. Melissa collapsed and was admitted to intensive care.

Hannah visited Melissa in hospital and told her she was all she had in the world and she was happy they met. Melissa tells her she's a true friend. Hannah applies make-up to Melissa, who was so weak she couldn't open her lip gloss. There was a montage showing the wires, drips, Melissa's bones sticking out and Hannah's family looking for answers back at her home. Hannah cries throughout this entire segment. The song "My Skin" by Natalie Merchant played throughout.

Melissa eventually engineered a plot to escape to Milan with Hannah, through fear that if she stayed in hospital and continued to be force-fed she would have got fat. Hannah agreed to the plan because she was fed up with her family interfering in her life. The two friends successfully escaped the hospital the next day, but had to return to Hannah's home to retrieve her passport; where Rhys and Suzanne grab her to prevent her from going. Melissa argued with Hannah's family before the stress of the situation caused her to collapse from a heart attack and despite Suzanne's attempts to revive her, Melissa died shortly after. Hannah then cradled Melissa's body, crying hysterically.

Melissa's death was one of the few episodes to not feature a wrap-up scene following the end credits.

In the episode following her death, a vision of Melissa reappeared to Hannah, as Hannah struggles to cope with her grief and is terrified that her mother will use Melissa's death to force her to eat. Hannah is seen trying on Melissa's dress (during the scene we see a flashback of Melissa proudly modelling the size zero dress for Hannah) Hannah however struggles to fit into the outfit, and a vision of Melissa appears and zips it up for Hannah, before vanishing.

89

== Nana McQueen ==
Nana McQueen
- Hollyoaks character
- Portrayed by: Diane Langton
- Duration: 2007–2009, 2012–2024
- First appearance: Episode 2072; 3 July 2007
- Last appearance: Episode 6506; 30 December 2024
- Introduced by: Bryan Kirkwood
- Spin-off appearances: Hollyoaks Later (2020)
In-universe information
- Occupation: Barmaid; entertainer
- Family: McQueen
- Mother: Queenie McQueen
- Brothers: Manford McQueen
- Sisters: Marguerite McQueen
- Husband: Reggie (backstory)
- Sons: Louis McQueen
- Daughters: Kathleen McQueen; Myra McQueen; Reenie McQueen
- Grandsons: Niall Rafferty; John Paul McQueen; Louis McQueen Jr.
- Granddaughters: Jacqui McQueen; Mercedes McQueen; Tina Reilly; Carmel McQueen; Michaela McQueen; Carmina McQueen; Porsche McQueen; Celine McQueen; Cleo McQueen; Theresa McQueen; Jennifique McQueen
- Nephews: Victor McQueen
- Nieces: Breda McQueen; Valene McQueen
- Other relatives: Bart McQueen; Phoebe McQueen (adoptive); Max McQueen; Bobby Costello; Matthew McQueen; Kathleen-Angel McQueen; Gabriel McQueen; Goldie McQueen; Prince McQueen; Hunter McQueen

Marlena "Nana" McQueen, played by Diane Langton, first appeared on 3 July 2007. Since her first appearance, Nana made further appearances in 2007 before returning in 2008 and again departing in 2009. Nana was reintroduced on 22 November 2012 as a regular character and remained until 19 November 2015, in which Langton chose to take an extended break from the show. She returned for two episodes on 24 and 25 October 2016 the following year, making further guest appearances on 13 and 14 February, 9 to 12 October in 2017 and 5 and 6 February, 6 to 8 March and 13 to 14 August in 2018. She made a permanent return from 21 September 2018, moving into the spare room at the Dog in the Pond after granddaughter, Mercedes becomes the landlady. Langton remained a cast member on the show until 2024, with her last appearance airing on 16 January 2024. Off-screen, the character went to stay with family in Spain, being referenced on-screen. After much speculation regarding the character and Langton's future on the show, it was confirmed that the character would return following the show's time jump in September 2024 with Nana's presence in the titles. She returned for three episodes in December 2024. Langton died in January 2025, with her final scenes having aired on 30 December 2024.

Nana is first seen in July 2007 when flirting with Russ Owen (Stuart Manning) in The Dog in the Pond public house. She enters the McQueen household to find her granddaughters fighting. When the rest of the McQueens get back, she sees Russ and claims he was chatting her up at The Dog. Nana reappears in October 2007 when her grandchildren Carmel McQueen (Gemma Merna) and John Paul McQueen (James Sutton) nearly die from carbon monoxide poisoning. She stirs up trouble by lying to her granddaughter Mercedes McQueen (Jennifer Metcalfe) that she has seen Carmel and Russ kissing at the hospital. Nana's daughter, Myra McQueen (Nicole Barber-Lane), tries to get along with her, but after she realises Nana has tried to steal the compensation money the family have received for Carmel and John Paul, Myra throws Nana out. Nana reminds Myra that she is her mother, but Myra exclaims that she stopped being her mother at the age of 14. Nana vows to return before leaving. Nana returns for the family's Christmas and Boxing Day celebrations. Neither she nor the rest of the family realise their guest, Niall Rafferty (Barry Sloane), is the son Nana forced Myra to give up at birth. During the dinner, Nana toasts her granddaughter Tina McQueen (Leah Hackett) for being a surrogate mother for her half-sister Jacqui McQueen (Claire Cooper) and her boyfriend Tony Hutchinson (Nick Pickard). Myra gets upset and leaves the table. Nana finds her in the bathroom, weeping over old newspaper clippings of the child she had given up at birth. Myra tells Nana she could never forgive her, or herself. Nana tells her to stop complaining and that she was right to give up the child. Myra slaps Nana for her comment, but Nana slaps Myra right back, leaving as she refused to be treated in such a manner.

In February 2008, Nana returns after Myra is arrested for benefit fraud. After having an argument with Myra she went to The Dog with Niall where she got drunk and confessed to Niall that she forced Myra to give up her son aged 14. In revenge Niall attacked her and left her for dead. She was later found by her granddaughter Tina, and returned home the next day. Nana and the rest of the McQueens were at that point unaware that it was Niall that attacked her. In September 2008, it was revealed that she was on a cruise so she couldn't attend Carmel and Calvin Valentine's (Ricky Whittle) wedding. She returned in November 2008 for Tina's funeral. She was unimpressed with Jacqui and John Paul because they failed to attend the service. Nana mentioned that her daughter, Kathleen McQueen (Alison Burrows), is in prison. She also mentions that Kathleen's daughter, Theresa McQueen (Jorgie Porter), is living with her as a consequence. After arguing with Myra over Niall, Mercedes, threw her out. She returned later the same month when it emerged that Theresa had slept with Tony, who was unaware she was only 15. Nana revealed she used to pose for a Dutch artist whose house she used to clean. In 2009 it turned out that these pictures were worth quite a lot of money; unfortunately for the McQueens, Leila Roy (Lena Kaur) had painted over the canvas. In June 2010 Theresa was sent to stay with Nana but returned after a few weeks, saying she had a miserable time.

In the summer of 2012, Carmel left Hollyoaks for a few months to live with Nana after having an accident with a self-tanning machine leaving her with a very distinct scar. Nana returned to Hollyoaks in November 2012 to help Carmel with life in the village. She arranges for her to go on a date with Barney Harper-McBride (Tom Scurr).

Nana has three daughters to three different fathers. She was once married to a man named Reggie but the marriage ended after Nana struggled to stay faithful. Although Nana cared for Reggie she said her true love was a man named Billy Bickerstaff who worked in a local chip shop. She has also mentioned having romances with men such as Willy Trotter, Ernie Partridge and Len Murphy. She was in an abusive relationship with a man named Derek Clough (Bruce Montague), Derek abused Marlena physically for years, he broke her jaw and put her in hospital more than once. He also raped her youngest daughter Reenie (Zöe Lucker), getting her pregnant aged 15 with daughter Porsche (Twinnie-Lee Moore). After Derek dies of heart attack, Reenie tells Nana that Porsche can never learn the truth about her father's identity; Nana agrees to keep the secret.

In November 2015, after Pete's sexual abuse of Porsche and her younger sister Cleo McQueen (Nadine Mulkerrin) is revealed, Nana cannot cope as she feels she could have done something to prevent the line of abuse that followed in the village, back at the McQueen house, after crying her eyes out, she picked a picture Kathleen-Angel had drawn from the wall having a drawing of Nana on and reading "My perfect Nana who looks after my family" Nana later put the picture against her and started crying, she later disappeared and Myra and the other McQueens finding a letter from her saying she had gone to Alicante, leaving Myra horrified.

Nana returns in October 2016, leaving Myra shocked to find her on the doorstep, she sets out to clean the house and discovers everything that has gone on in her absence and helps Myra find a new man, due to Diego Salvador Martinez Hernandez De La Cruz (Juan Pablo Yepez) being in prison. In 2017, Nana returns to the village just as Cleo McQueen and Joel Dexter leave to go to visit Tanzania on holiday and Nana, along with Myra, are shocked to find out that Cleo is pregnant.

== Bonnie Bevan ==
Bonnie Bevan
- Hollyoaks character
- Portrayed by: Melanie Walters
- Duration: 2007–2009
- First appearance: 21 August 2007
- Last appearance: 14 August 2009
In-universe information
- Husband: Gareth Bevan
- Sons: Elliot Bevan

Bonnie Bevan is Elliot Bevan's mother. She desperately wanted him to marry a fellow Welsh girl named Rhiannon. When she came to visit, Elliot had paid Steph Dean to pose as his girlfriend so he could get out of his previous engagement. Bonnie did not approve, and finally Elliot told he didn't want to marry Rhiannon. Bonnie returned the next year when Elliot was in hospital for hypothermia. He'd been trying to track down his father, who he believed had been taken by a UFO some years earlier. Bonnie told him that his father had abandoned them and had wanted nothing to do with Elliot, even though she'd kept him up to date on Elliot for years. Elliot told her he wanted nothing more to do with her.

Bonnie returned on 14 August 2009 where she confronted her ex-husband Gareth. She informed Elliot that Gareth had had an affair when she was pregnant with him and he left to be with his mistress, who had also fallen pregnant.

== Clive Harris ==
Clive Harris
- Hollyoaks character
- Portrayed by: Andrew Forbes
- Duration: 2007
- First appearance: August 2007
- Last appearance: August 2007
In-universe information
- Daughters: Jessica Harris

Clive Harris was the father of Jessica Harris. Jessica had been brought up rich thanks to him, only for him to go bankrupt in spring 2007. After months of struggling, Jessica was thrilled when he appeared just in time to help with her debts. He told her of a business dinner he had prepared and wanted her to attend. He encouraged her to wear a sexy red dress and flirt with the client. Reluctantly, Jessica went along with him, only to see him arrested for fraud just as the deal was being made. Jessica visited him in prison and told him he'd ruined all her happy memories, as she now had to assume their money had always come from illegal activities. Clive told her they were the same type of person, whether she liked it or not. A few weeks later, he sent her some money. After some temptation to spend on herself, she instead paid back Jack Osborne.

== Valerie Holden ==
Valerie Holden
- Hollyoaks character
- Portrayed by: Jacqueline Leonard (2007); Samantha Giles (2008–2010)
- Duration: 2007–2008, 2010
- First appearance: 6 September 2007
- Last appearance: 13 August 2010
In-universe information
- Mother: Sybil
- Sons: Danny Valentine
- Daughters: Lauren Valentine

Valerie "Val" Holden arrived in the village with her two children Danny and Lauren, who are the illegitimate children of Leo Valentine. She turned up at the Valentine residence to demand that Leo looked after the two while she sorted out her housing problems.

She returned in January 2008 to live with the Valentines, causing a stir with the locals. She took Sasha out clubbing and was involved in a fight with Katy Fox, which they both spent a night in the cells for. She then clashed with the McQueens over bingo winnings and began planning Carmel McQueen's wedding to Calvin. However, Valerie kissed Calvin before the wedding and, racked with guilt, she left to live in Spain. Danny later leaves to find her.

When Lauren is hospitalised, Valerie returns to take her daughter back to Spain. Lauren is delighted but Sasha acts very coldly towards Valerie. After Lauren dumps her boyfriend Gaz Bennett who is in prison, Valerie is delighted to hear that Lauren wants to leave with her after all when she argues with Leo about the situation. She later changes her mind and leaves with Leo taking Lauren and inviting Spencer Gray to accompany them.

== Pete Webster ==
Pete Webster
- Hollyoaks character
- Portrayed by: Richard Cambridge
- Duration: 2007
- First appearance: 8 October 2007
- Last appearance: 9 December 2007
In-universe information
- Mother: Mrs. Webster

Pete Webster was the head of the Careers department at Hollyoaks High School. His mother was head teacher. When Tina McQueen began working for Pete, he seemed friendly, but he soon began sexually harassing her. When she refused his advances, he did his best to undermine and intimidate her. He also befriended her husband, Dominic Reilly, who took Pete's word over hers. During a blackout, Pete tried to force himself on Tina, only to meet a fist belonging to Russ Owen Tina's brother-in-law; Tina was promptly fired, and Russ suspended. Tina had the last laugh though, as her sister Jacqui McQueen took over her job and flirted heavily with Pete. Alone in his office, she convinced him to take his clothes off. When he did, she kneed him in the groin, grabbed his clothes and keys, and locked him in the office. Pete was last seen as Tina called his wife, then his mother, to tell them to come down to the school to see him.

== Nige Foster ==
Nige Foster
- Hollyoaks character
- Portrayed by: Sam Townend
- Duration: 2007–2009
- First appearance: 12 October 2007
- Last appearance: 27 February 2009

Nigel "Nige" Foster was an acquaintance of Ste Hay's (Kieron Richardson) who took over the local drug-pushing trade from one of Ste's friends, Tommo. Nige bullied Ste into temporarily letting him move into the flat Ste shared with Amy Barnes (Ashley Slanina-Davies) and her baby Leah Barnes. When Michaela McQueen (Hollie-Jay Bowes) met him, it was lust at first sight and they quickly made use of Ste and Amy's bedroom. She forced her bandmates Jamie "Fletch" Fletcher (Sam Darbyshire) and Josh Ashworth (Sonny Flood) to let him join, although his abilities were limited to a very poor trumpet. He later asked her to give a year 11 student drugs. The student was not there and Michaela threw the drugs at Amy when she saw teacher Russ Owen (Stuart Manning) heading their way. Amy got out of trouble, but Nige wanted his money. When Amy protested, Nige threatened her.

Nige returned some months later when Sasha Valentine (Nathalie Emmanuel) needed heroin. She reluctantly slept with him in order to get the drugs. Fletch, who by that time was also a heroin addict, was repulsed by what she had done, but finally agreed to Nige's demand that he sell drugs to schoolchildren in return for some heroin of his own. She slept with him again while babysitting Leah, who got dangerously close to a syringe.

Later, Nige needed money to pay his suppliers, and he resorted to stealing Justin Burton's (Chris Fountain) laptop and having Sasha assist him in breaking into recently widowed Steph Cunningham's (Carley Stenson) flat. When Danny Valentine (David Judge) caught Sasha in Steph's flat, Danny and his father, Leo Valentine (Brian Bovell), tracked down and beat up Nige.

Later, Calvin Valentine (Ricky Whittle) spotted Nige dealing drugs and took them Nige and told him to run, Calvin then put the drugs in his pocket, only for them to be uncovered by his partner Eddie later on, which resulted in Calvin nearly losing his job. Warren Fox (Jamie Lomas) revealed to Calvin he had the whole transaction between Calvin and Nige on tape, and after a few days of blackmailing Calvin with the tape, Warren asked for Calvin's assistance at The Loft. Calvin went in to find Nige there arguing with Warren. Nige spotting Calvin, pulled a knife and as Calvin tried to defuse the situation, Nige teased him about sleeping with Sasha, Calvin lost it and attacked Nige. During the scuffle Nige stabbed Calvin and Calvin hit Nige with a blunt object to the head. As Calvin was rushed to hospital, Warren met him the next day and revealed Calvin had killed Nige. Warren made plans with Calvin to dispose of the body, but Calvin failed to keep them, resorting in Warren having to dispose of the body himself.

On 20 November 2008, several months after the murder, the viewers discovered Warren was paying Nige to stay out of sight to continue the illusion Calvin has killed him. Calvin eventually confessed to Sasha that he murdered Nige, and racked with guilt posted his and Carmel McQueen's (Gemma Merna) life savings through the letterbox of Nige's parents' house. On 21 January 2009, Nige showed up at The Loft wanting even more money from Warren and in the process nearly exposed himself to Calvin. Warren snuck Nige outside and said that if he ever saw him again he would kill him. On 27 February, Calvin discovered Nige dealing in a carpark. Nige fled and this was his last appearance.

== Simon Crosby ==
Simon Crosby
- Hollyoaks character
- Portrayed by: Simon Lawson
- First appearance: 12 October 2007
- Last appearance: 19 December 2007
In-universe information
- Wife: Gemma Crosby
- Sons: Connor Crosby

Simon Crosby was a lifeguard at the local pool and quickly ingratiated himself to Sam "O.B." O'Brien after he saved young Tom Cunningham from drowning. He got on well with everyone, but when Gilly Roach went to work as a lifeguard, he saw Simon and a young boy as the boy left the changing room in tears. He began to suspect Simon was a paedophile, and eventually broke into Simon's home, and when he looked on Simon's laptop, he found photos of boys in swimming trunks. He told Tom's brother Max Cunningham, who panicked as Simon had taken Tom to the park and they weren't answering Max's calls. They broke into Simon's home and found a locked room which was a boy's bedroom. When Max caught up to Tom and Simon at the park, he began beating Simon until he was pulled away. Soon rumours spread around town and when Simon went into the Dog the next day, Gilly and Jake Dean taunted and jeered him. They followed him down the street, gathering a lynch mob who followed him to his home and smashed bottles and bricks against the doors and windows.

Meanwhile, Simon's ex-wife Gemma, whom he'd mentioned but no one had ever seen, finally showed up, and was horrified by Max's accusations. She told them the swimming photos were for certificates for each of the kids Simon taught, and the bedroom was a reminder of their son Connor, who had drowned, which was the reason Simon had become a lifeguard in the first place. When the police showed up, the mob ran away. Afterwards, Gemma, Max and O.B. raced to Simon's home, but by the time they got inside, they found him unconscious on the kitchen floor from vodka and pills, holding a photo of his son. Simon soon recovered, but with his reputation in tatters, he realised he could no longer stay in Chester. He asked O.B. to join him working at a bar in Tenerife, but O.B. declined. They agreed to stay in contact.

== Harry Thompson ==
Harry Thompson
- Hollyoaks character
- Portrayed by: Daniel Seymour (2007–2009); Harrison George Rhodes (2009); Parry Glasspool (2013–2019)
- Duration: 2007–2009, 2013, 2015–2019
- First appearance: 17 October 2007
- Last appearance: 29 August 2019
- Introduced by: Bryan Kirkwood (2007, 2015); Lucy Allan (2009)
- Spin-off appearances: Hollyoaks Later (2009, 2013)
In-universe information
- Occupation: Student; Prostitute
- Father: Tony Hutchinson
- Mother: Tessie Thompson
- Stepmother: Mandy Richardson; Cindy Cunningham; Diane Hutchinson
- Half-brothers: Beau Ramsey; Anthony Hutchinson; Ro Hutchinson
- Half-sisters: Grace Hutchinson; Morgan Osborne; Dee Dee Hutchinson (adoptive); Eva Hutchinson (adoptive)
- Husband: Ste Hay (2018–2019)
- Sons: Isaac Thompson
- Stepsons: Lucas Hay
- Stepdaughters: Leah Barnes (adoptive); Hannah Hay-O'Connor
- Grandfathers: Edward Hutchinson
- Grandmothers: Victoria Hutchinson
- Uncles: Dominic Reilly; Eric Foster
- Aunts: Verity Hutchinson; Eva Hutchinson

Harry Thompson (also Hay) was originally played by Daniel Seymour, is the son of Tony Hutchinson (Nick Pickard) and Tessie Thompson (Sian Gibson), whom Tessie kept secret from Tony for eight years. He is the godson of Kurt Benson (Jeremy Edwards), Ruth Osborne (Terri Dwyer), Rory "Finn" Finnigan (James Redmond) and Jambo Bolton (Will Mellor). He appeared in guest roles in October 2007, March 2008 and finally in March 2009, played by Seymour. He went onto appear in the second series of Hollyoaks Later, for Tony's wedding to Cindy Cunningham (Stephanie Waring), but played by Harrison George Rhodes and once again in the sixth series of Hollyoaks Later, to visit Tony and then go on a holiday with him to Spain. The role was once again recast to Parry Glasspool. For his role as Harry, Glasspool was nominated for a National Television Award for "Best Newcomer". In November 2014, it was announced that Harry would be returning in early 2015, once again played by Glasspool. In August 2016, Glasspool was suspended from the show for 2 weeks. On 16 October 2018, Parry left the show temporarily but returned early 2019. He was killed-off on 23 July 2019, however he appeared as a ghost on 29 August 2019.

Tony got to spend a few days with Harry, but Harry didn't get along with Tony's girlfriend, Jacqui McQueen (Claire Cooper) who resented Tony having a child since she could not have one. Jacqui asked Tony to choose between her or Harry and he chose Harry, but later changed his mind, and gave up all contact with Harry. In March 2008, Harry began contacting Tony even though Tony asked him not to call. When Jacqui found out, she decided that since they were going to have a surrogate baby of their own, she should let Harry back into Tony's life. Harry also discovers that his half-sister Grace died two years ago, and was devastated, as never got a chance to see her. Harry came for a brief visit and formed a bond with Jacqui. Tony was so pleased he even put a photo of Harry on the wall of Il Gnosh. He returned in March 2009, after Tony decided to start seeing him again and get his life back on track. Harry appeared in the second and sixth series of Hollyoaks Later for Tony's wedding to Cindy Cunningham (Stephanie Waring) and for his holiday to Spain.

Harry returns after he is expelled from the boarding school, since Tony didn't pay the school bills. He discovers that Tony had an affair with his stepdaughter Sinead O'Connor (Stephanie Davis), by his wife Diane Hutchinson (Alex Fletcher), which makes him angry with Tony, but he eventually forgives him. Just before school, he met John Paul McQueen (James Sutton) at the Loft and they kiss. Right after this, Harry becomes a student at John Paul's school Hollyoaks High and becomes friends with his cousin Cleo McQueen (Nadine Mulkerrin) who he begins a relationship with. He also forms friendships with Cindy's daughter Holly Cunningham (Amanda Clapham) and Zack Loveday (Duyane Boachie).

Harry, Cleo, Holly, Zack and Holly's boyfriend Jason Roscoe (Alfie Browne-Sykes) accidentally run over Dylan Jenkins (James Fletcher) while on their way to a festival in a stolen car. Harry helps them get rid of the car and cleaning it. Jason manages to destroy it and they are off the hook as the police don't have enough evidence to continue the case. When John Paul gets his job back at school Harry is shocked to discover John Paul is his teacher and John Paul is equally shocked to see Harry is still in school. Later when Tony hosts a meal for John Paul, Darren Osborne (Ashley Taylor Dawson) and Ste Hay (Kieron Richardson), he is shocked to discover that John Paul and Ste are married. John Paul asks Harry not to say anything as he doesn't want to risk losing his marriage or his career. Harry shocks John Paul by saying that he is not gay. The two later bump into each other after Harry had a fight with Cleo and their kiss is mentioned again. Their conversation is overheard by Sinead and she and her cousin Scott Drinkwell (Ross Adams) send Harry a text from John Paul's phone asking to meet him in a gay bar where they and John Paul are at in an attempt to break Ste and John Paul up so Sinead can have Ste to herself. John Paul informs Harry he's been tricked and Harry meets Ste, Aiden (Joseph Cocklin) and Kyle Bigsby (Mitchell Hunt) outside. Worried about people discovering his sexuality, Harry lies and says Ste tried it on with him, but regrets it when Aiden and Kyle viciously attack Ste and then force him to take the blame for the attack. Zack figures out it was them and calls the police clearing Harry's name. Ste later questions Harry over the event and Harry admits he's not ready to tell his father the truth just yet. Ste promises to support him pointing out that he was through similar experiences himself. The two later share an unexpected moment at Diane's flat.

When Cleo's sexually abusive stepfather Pete Buchanan (Kai Owen) arrives back, Harry is unaware that he is grooming Cleo. Cleo dumps Harry after he cost her a job by starting a whipped cream fight, Harry then thinks Cleo is seeing someone else and when he sees Cleo with Pete he's unaware that Pete is the other man. Harry then ends up locked in a toilet with Ste by Sinead mistaking Ste for Scott in a desperate attempt to keep Scott from lusting after Ste. She is unaware however that Harry is lusting after Ste, too. Harry asks Ste some questions about his relationship with Sinead and kisses Ste who then regrets what he did. Harry then becomes jealous watching Ste and Sinead together and later comforts Ste after Tony made insensitive comments about his HIV and his relationship with Sinead. Harry then tries to kiss Ste again but Ste tells him to stay away from him.

When Harry finds out that Ste proposed to Sinead he angrily accuses him of stringing her along and it turns into passion where they are nearly caught by Sinead. Harry then attempts to comfort Ste when it was revealed that Cameron Campbell (Cameron Moore) killed Ste's father, Danny Lomax (Stephen Billington), and stepmother, Sam (Lizzie Roper). He then sends Ste a text about their relationship which Sinead reads. When the plumbing breaks at the boarding house, Harry has a shower at Diane's and Ste accidentally walks in on him. Harry then decides to use the situation to his advantage by making suggestive comments while wearing a towel in order to tempt Ste. Ste tells him there can never be a relationship between them, so Harry writes down how he feels in an email which is discovered by Tony. Ste then later admits his feeling to Harry, and they later have sex. Ste then later decides to end things with Sinead, but decides not to tell her. Ste and Harry then later have sex again. Harry then sends a text to Ste which Sinead reads, causing her to discover the affair. Sinead leaves the village forever and Ste dumps him. Later, when Ste is alone at Diane's Harry tries to convince him to give them another chance and Ste gives in. They narrowly avoid detection by Diane and they continue their affair.

In October 2015, Tony discovers the affair of Ste and Harry, which shocks his stepmother Diane, and finally discovers why Sinead left Hollyoaks forever. In November 2015, Harry finally comes out to his father and accepts his sexuality and his relationship with Ste. On his 18th birthday, he discovers that his mother, Tessie, and his godparents Ruth, Kurt, Jambo and Rory cannot attend to his 18th birthday, as he discovers that Jambo refused to return to Hollyoaks since the death of Dawn Cunningham in eighteen years. Later that day Ste tells Harry that, due to his HIV, he now has to go on medication, but Harry accepts it. Ste later breaks up with him that night anyway after being manipulated by Tony, who refuses to believe Harry's gay. Harry later sees Cleo holding hands with her step-father Pete and she accidentally lets it slip she was having a relationship with him for years. Furious, Harry storms to the Dog, where Reenie and Pete are having their wedding ceremony, and publicly outs him as a paedophile. On Christmas Day Harry finds out that he was accepted into a football scholarship in California. He then discovers that Tony had called the police on Ste for doing drugs in order to wreck their relationship. Harry then packs his things and leaves saying Tony was the worst father ever and he was sick of Tony trying to control him. He is shocked however to see Ste about to reunite with John Paul and runs off heartbroken. He then returns to Tony's as he has nowhere else to go, but Ste comes and says Harry's the one he wants and Harry agrees to give them a go. When Tony protests, Ste invites Harry to live with him and Harry agrees. They spend Christmas together with Ste's family in The Dog.

Harry continues to date Ste, but the relationship turns turbulent when Ste gets kicked out of the Lomaxes' and Harry goes with him after Cameron frames Ste with some drugs that he found in the house. Harry then has sex with James Nightingale (Gregory Finnegan) after being put under pressure by the older man. The money, however, was not needed, as Leela and Tegan give Ste a second chance. They then lead on to break up as Ste discovers that he slept with James. Ste ends up becoming addicted to crystal meth after Cameron gives him some, and Harry and Ste get back together in that period of time. After originally going to leave for France, Tony decides to stay behind in Hollyoaks to help Harry get Ste over the addiction. After the first night, Tony decided to hand Ste over to doctors, who will be able to give him real help. During Ste's trial for Amy Barnes' (Ashley Slanina-Davies) murder, Ste tells him that he knows Harry was the one who really killed her. Harry explains to Ste that he didn't mean to kill Amy and that he thought she was still alive when he left her house, following an argument in which she fell and hurt her head. He assumed her husband Ryan Knight (Duncan James) would come home and call an ambulance if necessary but, when he discovered she had died, he was too frightened to say anything. Harry attempts to confess but Ste and James stop him and James plans to set someone else up for the murder. James successfully casts doubt over Ste's guilt by suggesting that DI Armstrong killed Amy, resulting in Ste being released. However, Ste subsequently breaks up with him because of what he did to Amy. Via flashback, the audience finds out that Harry was not responsible for Amy's murder as, once he left her house, Ryan entered and killed her.

When Harry confesses to Tony that he is responsible for Amy's murder, Tony kicks him out of the house and he becomes homeless. Tony eventually confesses Harry's secret to Diane, causing tension in their marriage. Ryan discovers Harry has started working as a prostitute in order to earn money. James later also finds out and offers to let Harry live with him, although he will still work as a rent boy, with James finding him more high-class clients so that he is not in danger. When attempting to seal a deal for his company, the client asks James for Harry's services as a sweetener. Seeing Harry and the older man enter a room and hearing them discuss money, Tony interrupts them, believing his son to be involved in drug deals and discovers his job as a prostitute.

When Tony and Diane go on holiday, Harry becomes a stowaway in the boot of their car in order to escape. After an accident involving the Maalik family where Diane is heavily injured, Harry appears to try and help her. She forgives him for killing Amy, and tells him to flee which he does. He briefly stays with James, until handing himself to the police following a confession to the murder. Harry is sent to prison. He is later released after Ryan confesses to murdering Amy and having set Harry up. He is set to move in with James and begin a relationship, but a moment of passion with ex Ste puts an end to that. He moves back in with Tony and Diane, and gets back together with Ste. On a camping trip with Ste's children, Leah (Elà-May Demircan) and Lucas (William Hall), they are ambushed by Ryan who confesses to all of his crimes before running off. Harry chases after him and after a brief struggle, Ryan accidentally falls into a river screaming for Harry to help him, but Harry walks away leaving Ryan to his death, which Harry later feels guilty for. Ste and Harry later become engaged and plan a wedding.

Ste and Harry later marry. However, this is cut short when Ste discovers Harry's affair with James and Harry is not able to support Ste at the hospital, where his sister is in a critical condition. Harry then goes to talk to James, who tells him their relationship is over. With no one to support him, especially his father, Harry leaves the village. Harry returns in the new year and makes a bee line for James – after initially rejecting him; Harry soon wins him round and, after a tricky start, moves in with James and his son, Romeo Nightingale (Owen Warner). Harry is stabbed to death by serial killer, Breda McQueen (Moya Brady), as part of her vendetta against "bad dads". Harry reappears in a dream of Tony, when he is also stabbed by Breda for learning she had killed him.

== Terry Hay ==
Terry Hay
- Hollyoaks character
- Portrayed by: Conor Ryan (2007–2014); Stuart Wolfenden (2019)
- Duration: 2007–2008, 2014, 2019
- First appearance: 24 October 2007
- Last appearance: 28 January 2019
- Introduced by: Bryan Kirkwood
In-universe information
- Wife: Pauline Hay (until 2013)
- Stepsons: Ste Hay (until 2013)

Terry Hay was Ste Hay's abusive stepfather. Terry was mentioned in 2006 when Ste showed up at school with bruises on his face. Terry was first seen in October 2007, when he convinced the Barnes family that Ste was a danger to their daughter Amy and her baby Leah. When they went to Ste and Amy's flat, Terry began beating Ste until Mike Barnes pulled him off and threw him out. A few months later, after Ste had had a visit from his mother Pauline Hay, Terry showed up and told them that things always got bad for him when Pauline started whining about her son. He almost broke Ste's finger and told them he'd call the cops on them unless they stayed clear of him and Pauline. In March 2008, Pauline showed up again and told Ste that Terry was gone.

In 2014, Terry went to visit Ste in the village to apologise to him for what he did to him and his mother for which he forgives him. Ste later tells him that he and John-Paul are getting married, he gives them a blessing but couldn't attend their wedding due to work conflicts.

== Gemma Crosby ==
Gemma Crosby
- Hollyoaks character
- Portrayed by: Gemma Langford
- First appearance: 18 December 2007
- Last appearance: 19 December 2007
In-universe information
- Husband: Simon Crosby
- Sons: Connor Crosby

Gemma Crosby was Simon Crosby's ex-wife. As none of the locals had ever seen her, when they began to believe Simon was a paedophile, they assumed he had made her up. Gemma arrived in town the day a lynch mob had formed around his home, and she explained to Max and O.B. that her and Simon's son had drowned, which was one of the reasons Simon had become a lifeguard, and that Simon would never harm a child. Gemma, Max, and O.B. found Simon slumped on the kitchen floor after a suicide attempt. Gemma was at Simon's side during his hospital stay, but when he recovered, they again parted.

== Other characters ==
Character	Date(s)	Actor	Circumstances
Freddie	4 January–2 February 2007	Ben Parr	When Becca Dean (Ali Bastian) was sent to prison, her sister Nancy (Jessica Fox) needed a lodger. She soon decided on Freddie, who just happened to be a stripper. She enjoyed watching him practice his routines, and invited him to perform at her friend Hannah Ashworth's (Emma Rigby) 18th birthday party. When Becca's husband Jake Dean (Kevin Sacre) moved in with baby Charlie Dean (Charlie Behan), Nancy asked Freddie to move out.
Tania	2–3 January 2007	Bibi Nerheim	While visiting Chester, Copenhagen native Tania met Gilly Roach (Anthony Quinlan) and they quickly became lovers. After a few days, Tania had to go back home, but asked Gilly to join her. He agreed, but as he had no money, his best friend Rhys Ashworth (Andrew Moss) got him a job as an escort. Rhys, who was jealous of their relationship, told Tania where Gilly was. When she saw Gilly having dinner with a woman, she left for Copenhagen on her own, sending Gilly a text saying she could not be with a man she didn't trust.
Nathan	12 January–10 April 2007	Ali Natkiel	HCC student Nathan was Kris Fisher' (Gerard McCarthy) boyfriend. Kris used him to annoy his crush Jessica Harris (Jennifer Biddall) and was annoyed by how frequently Nathan tried to contact him. After a few months, Nathan dumped Kris via text.
Molly Traverse	3–4 April 2007	Kate Deakin	Rhys Ashworth (Andrew Moss) had a wild night with a woman he could not recall, and was shocked when the somewhat homely Molly tracked him down. In order to be free of her, Rhys lied that he'd just gotten out of a relationship. Gilly Roach (Anthony Quinlan) was charmed by Molly and asked her out, but on their first date, she put her hands all over him and told him they'd be married within six months. Rhys called her mobile to give Gilly an excuse to flee. When Gilly found out she had a season ticket to football, he almost stayed, but Rhys persuaded him to go while he could.
DS Creswell	31 May 2007	Tracey Moore	DS Creswell was the lead detective after Josh Ashworth (Sonny Flood) was arrested for hitting Mike Barnes (Tony Hirst) in the head with a brick.
Janet	6 June 2007	Zoe Aldrich	Janet was in charge of the bridal shop visited by the McQueen sisters. Jacqui McQueen (Claire Cooper) repeatedly clashed with the snobby Janet, and finally locked her in the changing room, followed by the five sisters fleeing the store in their wedding attire.
D.S. Grant	25 June–20 September 2007	Gil Kolirin	Grant investigated Clare Devine's (Gemma Bissix) fall off the Loft balcony.
Meg	20 June–5 July 2007	Tiffany Chapman	Meg was a social services worker who briefly took Tom Cunningham (Ellis Hollins) from his brother Max Cunningham (Matt Littler).
Adam Clarke	6–28 August 2007	Andonis Anthony	Jessica Harris (Jennifer Biddall) and Zak Ramsey (Kent Riley) briefly worked at a phone advice hotline run by Adam. Intrigued by Jess, he asked her to work for him to prey on the bereaved to help them settle their loved ones' estates at a hefty cost. Jess hesitated over what to do, but eventually took the job, scamming the Osbornes out of several valuable items.
Dr. Sharma	14 August 2007	Jay Kiyani	Dr. Sharma told Jacqui McQueen (Claire Cooper) she was incapable of carrying a living child.
Clerk	22–24 August 2007	Charles Foster	The court clerk when Warren Fox (Jamie Lomas) was on trial for pushing Clare Devine (Gemma Bissix).
Anna Frais	22–24 August 2007	Lisa Shingler	Anna represented Warren Fox (Jamie Lomas) in his trial.
Edward Tunney	22–24 August 2007	Oliver Senton	Edward prosecuted Warren Fox (Jamie Lomas) in his trial.
Judge	22–24 August 2007	Martyn Read	He presided over Warren Fox's (Jamie Lomas) trial.
Bailiff	30 August 2007	Paul Stenton	He tried to remove the belongings from Jessica Harris' (Jennifer Biddall) room in halls, smashing Zak Ramsey's (Kent Riley) television in the process. Jessica's father Clive (Andrew Forbes) showed up and paid his daughter's debts.
Lex	30 August 2007	Steven Alvey	A business acquaintance of Clive Harris (Andrew Forbes). To persuade Lex to do business with him, Clive had his daughter Jessica Harris (Jennifer Biddall) wear a sexy red dress and flirt with Lex. Lex agreed to the deal, but the police arrived to arrest Clive for fraud. Lex tried to "comfort" Jessica, who told him to stay away.
Martin Spencer	1 October 2007	Marcus Hutton	Nancy Hayton (Jessica Fox) took his class at HCC. Martin told her he had also taught her late sister Becca Dean (Ali Bastian), which furthered Nancy's insecurities about becoming a carbon copy of her sister.
Vic	2 October 2007	Steve Bell	Vic was the instructor at the survival course Mercedes McQueen (Jennifer Metcalfe) and Carmel McQueen (Gemma Merna) went on (as the initial were S.P.A, they'd expected a spa). Vic and Mercedes got cosy, but after he told her he had "always wanted to test-drive a Mercedes", she was repulsed and pushed him away.
Jay	3 October 2007	Lewis Rainer	Jay met fellow student John Paul McQueen (James Sutton) in the SUbar. He went back to John Paul's for some fun, but John Paul's half-sister Tina McQueen (Leah Hackett) and her husband Dominic Reilly (John Pickard) were using John Paul's bed. Myra McQueen (Nicole Barber-Lane) walked in and got into an argument with John Paul about bringing a stranger home for sex. Jay left.
Adoption Officer	8 October 2007	Rebecca Courtney	She tried to help Jacqui McQueen (Claire Cooper) and Tony Hutchinson (Nick Pickard) in their quest to adopt a baby. When she learned Jacqui had a prison record, she said any further progress was unlikely.
Cupid	8 October 2007	Callum Byrum	A child Cupid who appeared in the opening and closing scenes, firing fantasy arrows at various couples.
Daisy	17–19 October 2007	Kimberly Slack	When Frankie Osborne (Helen Pearson) and Jack Osborne (Jimmy McKenna) decided to foster a child, their first attempt was Daisy, a little girl who stayed in various homes while her mother battled multiple sclerosis. Frankie and Jack quickly grew close to her, but Jack's son Darren Osborne (Ashley Taylor Dawson) was bitterly opposed to her presence. Before she returned home, Darren began to change his mind, and let her have a baseball cap she'd admired.
James	29–30 October 2007	Chris Brazier	James was Summer Shaw's (Summer Strallen) boyfriend. They had had a long-distance relationship for some time, as he was in the army. He visited her to tell her he was being sent to Afghanistan in a few days. A few weeks later, he dumped her via text.
Tommo	29 October, 8 November 2007	Nicholas Higgins	Tommo was first seen harassing Barry "Newt" Newton (Nico Mirallegro) on his first day at school, until Lauren Valentine (Dominique Jackson) and later Steph Dean (Carley Stenson) and Tom Cunningham (Ellis Hollins) warned him off. Tommo taunted Newt over being defended by girls. Tommo was seen a few weeks later at friend Ste Hay's (Kieron Richardson) housewarming party. When Amy Barnes' (Ashley Slanina-Davies) sister Sarah Barnes (Loui Batley) saw him lighting up a joint, Amy made Ste throw him out. After the party, Ste exchanged money with Tommo and revealed that he had to throw him out so Amy wouldn't know he was encouraging Tommo to get the other teens hooked on drugs.
Social worker	9 November 2007	Fiona Clarke	She showed up at Amy Barnes (Ashley Slanina-Davies) and Ste Hay's (Kieron Richardson) flat after Amy's mother Kathy Barnes (Sarah Jane Buckley) called social services following the house party.
Carl	13 November 2007, February 2008	Wesley Theobald	Carl, an old criminal associate of Warren Fox (Jamie Lomas), first showed up shortly before the engagement of Warren and Louise Summers (Roxanne McKee). Louise wanted to test Warren's loyalty to staying clean, so she asked Carl to offer Warren a big illegal job. Carl returned several months later with associate Anthony. They'd just attempted a bank robbery and blackmailed Warren into letting them stay in his flat. They overheard Jack Osborne (Jimmy McKenna) tell Warren that he was going to give him 100,000 pounds for his half of The Dog in the Pond public house. They planned to rob Jack and then leave with the money, but the police were called, and Carl and Anthony had to take Jack, Frankie Osborne (Helen Pearson), Barry "Newt" Newton (Nico Mirallegro) and Louise hostage. On the way to the car, Carl struggled with Jack and Jack's son Darren. Anthony shot Darren and sped away, leaving Carl to be arrested.
Bishop	15 November 2007	Faye McKeeve	Bishop was in charge of a Rant Club at the SUBar, where Jake Dean (Kevin Sacre), Malachy Fisher (Glen Wallace), and Gilly Roach (Anthony Quinlan), among others, vented their problems to an audience.
Counsellor	19 November 2007, 7 February 2008	Tom Sawyer	A counsellor who had sessions with anorexic Hannah Ashworth (Emma Rigby).
Receptionist	21 November 2007	Lyndsay Smith	Receptionist at the health spa Carmel McQueen (Gemma Merna) worked at after Evissa was damaged by fire. Carmel's sisters Jacqui McQueen (Claire Cooper) and Mercedes McQueen (Jennifer Metcalfe) went to the spa, stole a woman's wallet, and booked treatments under her name. When the receptionist learned the truth, they were thrown out, and Carmel was fired.
Heavy	12 December 2007	Paul Duckworth	Darren Osborne (Ashley Taylor Dawson) owed him gambling debts. When he threatened to harm Darren's ex-girlfriend, Darren found the money.
Counsellor	20 December 2007	Daniel Husbands	A counsellor who unsuccessfully attempted to help Darren Osborne (Ashley Taylor Dawson) with his gambling addiction.
Carol Singers	24 December 2007	Jonathan Taylor; Rachel Heaton; Mia Burke; Georgia Weddenburg	A group of Carol singers who sang outside The Dog in the Pond public house to lure in customers during Christmas time.
