= John Paul McQueen =

- Hollyoaks character
- Portrayed by: James Sutton
- Duration: 2006–2008; 2012–2017; 2019−2026
- First appearance: 6 September 2006
- Last appearance: 23 February 2026
- Introduced by: Bryan Kirkwood
- Spin-off appearances: Hollyoaks Later (2020)
In-universe information
- Occupation: Teaching assistant; English teacher; Shop assistant; DJ; Deputy head teacher; Waiter
- Family: McQueen
- Parents: Sally St. Claire; Myra McQueen
- Half-brothers: Niall Rafferty
- Half-sisters: Jacqui McQueen; Mercedes McQueen; Tina Reilly; Carmel McQueen; Michaela McQueen; Carmina McQueen
- Husband: Ste Hay (2014–2017)
- Sons: Matthew McQueen
- Stepsons: Lucas Hay
- Stepdaughters: Leah Barnes (adoptive)
- Grandmothers: Marlena McQueen
- Aunts: Reenie McQueen; Kathleen McQueen
- Nephews: Max McQueen; Bobby Costello; Gabriel McQueen
- Nieces: Maria-Carmella McQueen; Maria-Gabriella Fox-McQueen; Phoebe McQueen (adoptive)
- First cousins: Theresa McQueen; Celine McQueen; Porsche McQueen; Cleo McQueen
- Other relatives: Bart McQueen; Kathleen-Angel McQueen; Myra-Pocahontas Savage-McQueen; Goldie McQueen; Prince McQueen; Hunter McQueen

John Paul McQueen is a fictional character from the British Channel 4 soap opera Hollyoaks, played by James Sutton. The character debuted on-screen during the episode airing on 6 September 2006; his storylines have significantly revolved around his sexuality, evolving from the initial denial of his homosexuality, to the pursuit and relations with best friend Craig Dean (Guy Burnet), the storyline gained a fan-base and garnered them "supercouple status". The storylines received acclaim from LGBTQ rights charity Stonewall. John Paul later has a relationship with a priest, Kieron Hobbs (Jake Hendriks). In 2008, Sutton quit the serial and his character received a "sunset ending" with Craig, which was promised for fans by executive producer Bryan Kirkwood.

Sutton reprised the role in 2012 and John Paul returned on 18 December 2012, after leaving his role as Ryan Lamb in Emmerdale. Producers placed the character at the focus of a male rape story in 2014 when he is assaulted by a student, Finn O'Connor (Keith Rice). The character has been involved in a failed marriage to Ste Hay (Kieron Richardson), being hospitalised due to a drink that was spiked with drugs, being involved in a train crash with his family, which ultimately killed his older sister Carmel McQueen (Gemma Merna), a drunken kiss with student Harry Thompson (Parry Glasspool) which jeopardised his career, an affair with cousin-in-law, Lockie Campbell (Nick Rhys) and striking up a friendship with transgender boss Sally St. Claire (Annie Wallace), who later reveals that John Paul is her son. John Paul then has relationships with Scott Drinkwell (Ross Adams) and James Nightingale (Gregory Finnegan). In early 2017, Sutton announced his intentions to leave the serial and the character departed on 9 March 2017.

Sutton reprised the role on 26 March 2019 for a cameo appearance, and four months later, it was announced that Sutton had reprised the role on a regular basis. He returned on 9 December 2019 for two episodes to explore Finn's presence after his release, before returning in a regular capacity on 2 January 2020. Since his return, he was involved in a male domestic abuse storyline with George Kiss (Callum Kerr), and later deals with alcoholism, resulting in him crashing a minibus after suffering from withdrawal symptoms. John Paul later becomes part of a high-profile storyline regarding conversion therapy where Carter Shepherd (David Ames) befriends John Paul in the hopes of supposedly curing him of his homosexuality. In September 2025, it was announced Sutton had quit the role. John Paul departed on 23 February of the following year.

== Storylines ==
=== 2006–2008 ===
John Paul is the sixth of Myra McQueen's (Nicole Barber-Lane) eight children. He grew up around all women and was always the most level-headed of the group. John Paul meets Craig Dean (Guy Burnet) after saving him from a beating by Sonny Valentine (Devon Anderson). John Paul becomes close friends with Craig, Sarah Barnes (Loui Batley), Hannah Ashworth (Emma Rigby), and Nancy Hayton (Jessica Fox).

John Paul and Hannah begin dating and they lose their virginity to each other. While Hannah is head over heels for him, it is apparent John Paul does not feel the same way. After John Paul breaks up with Hannah, everyone mistakenly believes it is because he has feelings for Sarah, who is Craig's girlfriend. John Paul and Hannah later reconcile. At Hannah's 18th birthday party, John Paul emotionally confesses to Craig that he is in love with him. Afterwards, John Paul tells Craig he did not mean it and they agree to forget about it.

Craig drunkenly kisses John Paul at a school dance-off competition. Hannah sees the kiss and announces it to the whole school. John Paul tells a devastated Hannah that he is gay. After Hannah's mother, Suzanne (Suzanne Hall), tells Myra everything, she confronts John Paul about his sexuality. John Paul comes out to his family and while his sisters are supportive, Myra struggles with the revelation. John Paul also comes out to his friends and classmates, which leads to him being teased and bullied. Craig, not wanting to be perceived as gay, attacks John Paul physically, which effectively ends their friendship.

John Paul and Craig later make up and become close again. John Paul begins dating a DJ named Spike (Tom Vaughan). Craig is jealous of all the time John Paul spends with Spike and John Paul tells him that he needs to accept his new relationship. Much to John Paul's surprise, Craig confesses he has feelings for him and they sleep together. Afterwards, John Paul is thrilled, but Craig pretends nothing happened between them. Eventually, they sleep together again and John Paul assumes this means Craig is going to come out. However, Craig tells John Paul that he is not gay, not finishing with Sarah, and wants to see John Paul on the side. John Paul is disgusted by the proposition at first, but he eventually gives in and the two begin an affair.

Craig tells John Paul he loves him and they both agree to finish with their partners so they can be together. John Paul finishes with Spike, but Craig keeps finding excuses not to finish with Sarah. John Paul grows increasingly frustrated with Craig, who keeps on assuring him that they have a future. Spike finds out about the affair and threatens to expose it, but John Paul gets him to back down. Hannah is suffering from anorexia and tells John Paul it was triggered by their break-up, leaving him guilt-ridden.

John Paul finally reaches his breaking point when he finds out Craig and Sarah are engaged when he walks in on their engagement party. John Paul texts Sarah on Craig's mobile and she discovers the two of them kissing. Sarah announces to the whole party what she saw and everyone is left in tatters. John Paul still wants to be with Craig and he is thrilled when Craig tells him he wants to be with him, too. Despite the disapproval of their friends and family, John Paul and Craig officially start a relationship. However, John Paul cannot get over how Craig seems ashamed to be with him. To prove his commitment to him, Craig asks John Paul to move with him to Dublin. At the airport, John Paul overhears Craig tell his brother, Jake (Kevin Sacre), that he is not gay. John Paul asks Craig to kiss him and when he cannot, John Paul tells Craig he loves him with all of his heart, but that he needs more than to be with a man who cannot even display affection towards him. Heartbroken, John Paul returns home, leaving a devastated Craig to go to Dublin alone.

John Paul tries to move on with his life. He begins attending Hollyoaks Community College and makes friends with other students. Hannah has recovered from her eating disorder and she and John Paul agree to be friends. Myra offers their home to a young Catholic priest named Kieron Hobbs (Jake Hendriks). John Paul is shocked to find out that Kieron is gay, but Kieron says it does not matter since he is celibate. An attraction grows between Kieron and John Paul, but Kieron refuses to break his vow of celibacy. Eventually, Kieron cannot deny his feeling for John Paul any longer and they begin seeing each other in secret. Myra is furious when she discovers the relationship, but John Paul tells her she needs to let him make his own choices. Kieron decides to leave the church and they take their relationship public. John Paul proposes to Kieron who joyfully accepts.

A while later, John Paul realises he is too young to get married and calls off the engagement, but he still wants to be with Kieron. John Paul is stunned when Craig returns to the village. Kieron accuses John Paul of not being over Craig, but John Paul insists he is. Kieron gives John Paul an ultimatum: either they get married the following week or it is over between them. John Paul tells a heartbroken Kieron that he cannot marry him. Craig tells John Paul he is not over him and wants a second chance. John Paul admits he still loves Craig and they sleep together. John Paul tells Craig he is and will always be the one for him and that he will finish with Kieron. John Paul is devastated when he finds Kieron dead after he was poisoned by John Paul's secret brother, Niall Rafferty (Barry Sloane). John Paul decides to start fresh with Craig and they leave together for Dublin.

A few weeks later, John Paul reappears when Niall kidnaps all the McQueens. John Paul had been lured back to Hollyoaks by Niall under false pretenses. When Niall makes Myra choose four of her children to die, John Paul volunteers to sacrifice his own life. Niall blows up the church they are in. They all survive except for Tina (Leah Hackett). John Paul later returns to Dublin.

=== 2012−2017 ===
John Paul unsuccessfully attempts to prevent Craig from leaving him at the coach station in Dublin. He ends up meeting Brendan Brady (Emmett J. Scanlan) and sleeps with him. He returns home for Christmas only to find an abandoned baby at his family's doorstep. He later discover Mercedes' actions and Carmel's face accident. John Paul tells Nancy that he is the father. He reveals that he and Craig decided to have a child to save their relationship. However, it is unknown who is the paternal father. He initially rejects the baby, but decides to be a single parent and names him Matthew. He secures a teaching job at the local sixth form. His colleague Jen Gilmore (Amy Downham) gets fired when it emerges she was previously in a relationship with student Tilly Evans (Lucy Dixon). However, when Patrick discovers John Paul's awareness of Jen's actions, he believes he will lose his job, so he and Doug cover Patrick's car with post-its as a prank. It seems John Paul will embark on a relationship with Doug Carter (PJ Brennan), after a tumultuous start, the two sleep together. Later, it turns out that Patrick was not intending to fire John Paul, but suspends him from work because of his prank. John Paul later starts dating Doug but ends because Doug is still in love with Ste Hay (Kieron Richardson).

John Paul meets supply teacher Danny Lomax (Stephen Billington). He kisses John Paul but does not see him for two weeks. John Paul later tells Danny that he will not be treated badly, but they soon begin dating. Matthew's mother, Chloe (Susan Loughnane) arrives and claims Craig is Matthew's father. She demands money or she will fight for custody, but a DNA test proves John Paul as the father. John Paul and Danny find the body of D.S. Trent while on a date. John Paul is upset to learn that Danny is married to Sam Lomax (Lizzie Roper), lies about Danny being present at the discovery and briefly implicates himself in the murder investigation. Finn O'Connor (Keith Rice) and Robbie Roscoe (Charlie Wernham) begin tormenting John Paul. The bullying intensifies with a series of pranks and homophobic abuse directed at John Paul. He tries to reason with Finn and help him with his family problems, but it only makes the situation worse. Follow by Doug death, John Paul shares a kiss with Ste and they grow closer.

After John Paul humiliates Finn he is placed in charge of a detention in which Finn is present. While alone with Finn, he attacks John Paul with an ornament and rapes him. John Paul goes to the police to report the attack but changes his mind before making a statement. John Paul confines himself to his bedroom and Sam offers him support. When he loses his temper with Peri Lomax (Ruby O'Donnell) for but Sam forgives him. John Paul returns to his job and is placed on a school trip with Finn and Robbie. Finn is involved in a quad bike accident and John Paul contemplates letting him die before administering CPR. Robbie wants to know why he was reluctant to save Finn and starts taunting him in class. John Paul loses his temper and punches Robbie. John Paul is suspended and arrested but given bail. He begins drinking and takes cocaine with Ste. But Robbie learns that Finn has raped John Paul and he apologises for his role in bullying. On the day of John Paul's assault hearing Robbie tries to confess, but Finn intercepts the confession writing an accusation that John Paul sexually harassed Robbie and this is read to the court, which serves him a six-month jail sentence. Sam learns of John Paul and Danny's affair and refuses to see him again. He also orders Ste to never visit him in prison.

Finn is later imprisoned for raping John Paul. Carmel is killed by a train accident during the wedding of their cousin Porsche after saving their cousin Theresa from Sonny. His relationship with Ste begins to recover and they agree to get married. But he begins taking drugs and drinking. John Paul tries to support Ste through his addiction but later decides to end their relationship. The pair reconcile and they marry. Their happiness was cut short, when he discovers that not only did Ste impregnate Sinead, he also has HIV. John Paul worries that Ste has passed the virus onto him but his test comes back clear. He tries to stand by Ste but their relationship eventually ends. He begins an affair with his cousin Porsche McQueen (Twinnie-Lee Moore)'s husband Lockie Campbell (Nick Rhys), but is shocked to learn that he is also sleeping with Mercedes. Porsche soon discovers her husband's infidelity and she orders John Paul, Lockie and Mercedes to leave the family home. John Paul supports Mercedes when her son Gabriel is stillborn. He tries to reconcile with Ste but he reveals he has moved on with Harry Thompson (Parry Glasspool). John Paul decides to focus on his career working alongside new head teacher Sally St. Claire (Annie Wallace). He discovers that she is a transgender woman and they form a friendship. John Paul incorrectly assumes Sally has developed romantic feelings for him when she tries to spend more time with him. Myra goes to confront Sally, but is shocked to learn that she had a relationship with her before she had gender reassignment. Sally reveals that she fathered John Paul and wants to reconnect with him but Myra asks her to keep it a secret.

John Paul along with Sally, Nathan Nightingale (Jared Garfield) and Holly, discover that his cousin Cleo McQueen (Nadine Rose Mulkerrin) is running away with Pete Buchanan (Kai Owen) who sexually abused her and her half-sister Porsche McQueen (Twinnie-Lee Moore) when they were younger and psychologically abused Celine McQueen (Sarah George). They rescue Cleo from Pete and when Pete is behind him, John Paul punches him. Pete then violently assaults him. While Pete assaults him, Sally accidentally reveals to John Paul that she is his father. After the discovery, he is angry at Sally and Myra for keeping it a secret all these years. After when John Paul angrily tells Sally to leave, he disowns Myra and kicks her out. John Paul's boyfriend Scott Drinkwell (Ross Adams) admits to John Paul that he knew that Sally was his father for over a week and promised her that he'd keep it a secret from him. John Paul breaks up with Scott and sleeps with James Nightingale (Gregory Finnegan).

John Paul reconciles with Scott, but there is clearly still something between him and James. John Paul ends up sleeping with James again and decides he has to break up with Scott. John Paul is temporarily blinded after being hit by Nancy's car. James and John Paul grow closer and James confides in John Paul about the physical abuse endured from his father, Mac (David Easter), as a child. John Paul pushes James to tell his family about the abuse, but James vehemently refuses. When John Paul tells James's brother Nathan about it, James dumps him. They get back together and John Paul moves into James's flat. While James accepts that John Paul has a son, but due to his own family history, he cannot be father to him. John Paul realises that they might not have a future because James is too stuck in his ways. James tells John Paul he loves him and that he will try to be a father to Matthew.

John Paul is horrified when he learns that Finn may be released from prison. James goes to the prison and winds Finn up to the point where he tries to physically attack him. This insures that Finn will remain in prison for the foreseeable future. James asks John Paul to marry him and he accepts. John Paul and Ste finalise their divorce. During their divorce party, John Paul and Ste reminisce and they end up sleeping together. John Paul tells Ste he loves him and wants to be with him not James, but Ste tells John Paul he wants to be with Harry. Ste calls John Paul to reiterate his point, but James picks up the phone and hears Ste say they slept together. James takes John Paul to the cliffside, where he tells him he knows he slept with Ste. James falsely claims he knocked Ste unconscious and stuffed him in the boot of his car. James shoves the car off the cliff and John Paul runs after it. John Paul opens the boot and sees that Ste is not inside. James tells John Paul they are over for good.

John Paul decides tell Ste he loves him, but then he sees Ste proposing to Harry. He decides to leave the village and move to Singapore. John Paul says an emotional goodbye to his family and boards the plane with Matthew. While on the plane Craig calls him. It is later confirmed that John Paul and Craig reconciled and they are together in Singapore.

=== 2019−2026 ===
Two years later, John Paul returns to the village after being summoned by Sally. Once he arrives, he was greeted by Sally, and he asked her what's the emergency and John Paul learns from Edward Hutchinson (Joe McGann) that Finn is released from prison and he and Sally need his help to get rid of Finn out of the village for good. John Paul disagrees on the idea. He later reunites with James and they have a drink together.

After having a talk with James, John Paul agrees to help Sally and Edward to get rid of Finn. John Paul goes to Finn's house and comes face-to-face with Finn after five years. When Diane accuses Sally and Nancy for bullying her son, John Paul said it's his idea and when Finn tells John Paul that he has changed, John Paul believes him and knows that he has changed. Despite allowed him to come back anytime he wants, John Paul then tells him that he must start a new, fresh life away from the village and to be a good father to his daughter Bella. Finn agrees to reunite with Amber and their daughter, and later leaves.

== Development ==
=== Creation and characterisation ===
John Paul McQueen was created in 2006; the backstory given to the character is that he grew up with five sisters (Jacqui, Mercedes, Tina, Carmel, and Michaela), his mum (Myra), and no father. He is characterised as smart, witty, and not afraid to stand up for himself and his beliefs. Sutton described his portrayal of John Paul's personality as different and similar to his own. "He's very, very quick to take [offence] sometimes", Sutton relayed. "He's a bit up and down, so that's a side of him I'm not too keen on, but he's also very sensitive and loving and he cares a lot about his family and his friends and that side of it is very true to me as well and that's kind of what I kind of brought to the table." Sutton stated that he had no trouble portraying a gay character because he had "spent a good part of [his] youth [in the theater] and there were a lot of openly gay men".

=== Sexuality ===
When detailing insight he gained about the gay community while portraying John Paul, Sutton stated, "My character was straight when I first started so I had to do the whole sort of questioning your sexuality and finding out who you are and what you're about and what your likes are and what your sexual preferences are, so I got a real insight from the storyline and just how hard it is." Sutton cited that John Paul "was very, very lucky in that his family were pretty much all supportive". Further detailing his character's personality and how he did not want John Paul to be a gay stereotype, Sutton revealed, "I was very, very keen to make this character a straight-acting gay man. He's just a normal guy, like any other guy. He plays football. He likes music. He likes going out. He likes all the same things that straight men like. He just happens to like blokes, and that's it." It was a joint effort by the writers and Sutton to characterise the character this way. "We kind of met in the middle and that was the path we wanted to go down", stated Sutton. "I think it was really important for people to see because, like I say, even now, especially older generations, often in my mind view the stereotype of the gay man as this kind of screaming queen with glitter and all that kind of … feather boas and glitter and you know, Danny La Rue."

=== Departure (2008) ===
In 2008, Sutton decided to leave the role of John Paul, stating that it was not an easy decision to make. "I'm twenty-five-years old and I've done this character for two years now", he cited, "and I feel like I've made my mark and I've got to get off my soapbox now. I kind of feel like I'm ready to take a risk before I hit 30 and realize that actually I've missed my opportunity. A calculated risk."

=== Reintroduction (2012) ===
On 12 October 2012, Daniel Kilkelly from Digital Spy revealed that Sutton had returned to Hollyoaks. The actor was seen back on the set, shortly after agreeing to reprise his role as John Paul. He had entered talks about a return with the show's producers earlier in the year. Kilkelly reported that little was known about John Paul's return storyline, but he would be seen on-screen in time for Christmas. He returned on 18 December 2012. At Christmas a baby was left on the McQueen's doorstep and it was revealed to be John Paul's. After speaking with his mother Myra, John Paul decided to keep his son and named him Matthew.

=== Homophobic bullying and male rape ===
In January 2014, John Paul became the focus of an issue-led story when he is raped by his student, Finn O'Connor (Keith Rice), after enduring months of homophobic bullying from Finn and Robbie Roscoe (Charlie Wernham). Planning for the story by the production team began in 2012 due to the extensive research required to portray the issue. The plot marks the second time Hollyoaks has tackled the issue, having previously explored it in 2000 when Luke Morgan (Gary Lucy) was raped. Bryan Kirkwood, the show's executive producer, stated that the story would be explored "within the constraints of a tea-time soap". He also wanted to showcase the "far-reaching consequences" for John Paul, Finn and their respective families. He also complimented Sutton and Rice, who he thought would perform the plot with "skill and empathy".

Hollyoaks worked with multiple charities, including Stonewall, St Mary's Sexual Assault Referral, Survivors Manchester and Survivors UK. Richard Lane, the media manager at Stonewall, commented that the soap contacted them to make the story "realistic and sensitive". Survivors Manchester became heavily involved in the storyline and Sutton went onto become an ambassador to the charity. Duncan Craig, founder of the charity, was impressed by the work of the cast and crew across the story, which he called "a culturally important milestone". He thought it would form a good example when he performed seminars about the issue. Craig added that the story would help the charities providing "services to males to break the silence". Sutton visited the charity to understand how to tackle the story and explained that the story would explore the "consequences of what happens to the character", as well as "how it changes him as a person". Additionally, he expressed his interest in portraying the story.

Finn, Robbie and other students begin bullying John Paul at school by insulting him and planning "malicious stunts in the classroom". After John Paul discovers evidence that could implicate Finn and Robbie, Finn argues with John Paul, before raping him at school. A press release from Hollyoaks explained that Finn is heterosexual, but attacks John Paul as "an act of aggression" and "an attempt to assert power over him". In the aftermath, John Paul began to blame himself for the assault. Sutton explained that John Paul believes that since he did not "fight back", he cannot justify it and is to blame for the incident. Consequently, John Paul is wondering "why he didn't do anything". Sutton added that the character feels "ashamed", "dirty" and judged following the assault. He also mentioned that John Paul is changed as a person by the attack, commenting, "You see this outgoing, confident man be completely destroyed".

=== Departure (2017) ===
On 11 January 2017, it was announced that Sutton was leaving his role as John Paul. A journalist from The Sun newspaper reported that John Paul was set to meet a grisly ending after driving off the edge of a cliff in his car in dramatic scenes airing later in the year. However, bosses remained tight-lipped as to whether it would actually be John Paul's exit storyline or not.

=== Reintroduction (2019) ===
On 18 March 2019, it was announced that Sutton had reprised his role for a cameo appearance in one episode that month. John Paul returns for the wedding of his parents, Myra and Sally St. Claire (Annie Wallace). Sutton filmed a video appearance, which was played to the congression at the wedding. The actor was unable to commit to a longer return due to commitments in theatre.

It was confirmed on 19 July 2019 that two former cast members would be returning on a permanent basis in the build-up to Hollyoaks' twenty-fifth anniversary during the following year. Sutton's return was announced five days later, following the announcement of Jamie Lomas' return as Warren Fox the previous day. Sutton expressed his delight at reprising the role, calling John Paul "a character that [he cares] deeply about". Executive producer Kirkwood called the character "one of the most beloved characters in Hollyoaks' history" and was pleased that he would be returning. He explained that he wanted John Paul to become a "figurehead" at Hollyoaks High School and bring order to the McQueen household as he returns for "another groundbreaking chapter".

Kirkwood invited Sutton for dinner, where he asked him to reprise his role. The actor was surprised, but flattered to be asked to return, especially since the soap had recently won a Best Soap award. In his absence, John Paul reunited with Craig, but they have separated when John Paul returns. Sutton explained that Craig leaves John Paul for his personal trainer. He confirmed that the split would be discussed and it is "not glossed over". Kirkwood revealed that he also invited Burnet back to the cast, but he declined the offer. He explained that it would be foolish not to reintroduce John Paul because of this. On the characters' relationship, Kirkwood commented, "I see them as having a lifetime of tortured romance — that will inevitably mean the occasional break-up."

The character returns for two episodes broadcast on 9 and 10 December 2019 prior to a permanent return on 2 January 2020. His initial return focuses on John Paul seeing Finn again following his release from prison. Craig (Survivors Manchester) saw Sutton's return as an opportunity to raise more awareness on male sexual violence. He also looked forward to seeing how John Paul "continues his healing journey" as a male survivor. Rice looked forward to working with Sutton on the story again. John Paul is called by Sally and Edward Hutchinson (Joe McGann) who want his help in getting Finn to leave the village. He initially refuses, but after speaking to James, he decides to confront Finn. Sutton explained that John Paul finds it hard to see Finn because that is the reason he left the village. He added that John Paul is "still very afraid of what Finn might do" so seeing him face-to-face is a struggle and "very difficult". The actor enjoyed filming John Paul's reunion with Finn and believed the storyline was "complicated" and "a lot more fluid and subjective than many storylines". He added, "Whether or not you can rehabilitate someone who's done something so heinous is quite an interesting question to ask of an audience." The confrontation concluded with Finn's departure and John Paul announcing that he would return to the village after revisiting Singapore.

John Paul returns and is appointed the deputy headteacher at the school. The job establishes the character as part of the show's year-long county lines drug trafficking storyline, which incorporates many families. Sutton looked forward to being involved in the story and working with the younger cast, calling them "wonderful and so talented". John Paul also reconnects with James after returning to the village. Sutton opined that they have "a complicated history", which would be explored. The actor was excited to work with Finnegan again. John Paul's relationship with the McQueen family, in particular with Mercedes, is explored upon his return. Sutton thought John Paul and Mercedes were "a lovely brother and sister combination" and observed how they were "each other's confidants" because they are similar ages and get on well. He added that he felt they shared a sibling relationship in real life too.

Following his return, Sutton appears as John Paul in a special episode of Hollyoaks Later. The plot focuses on the conclusion of Breda McQueen's (Moya Brady) serial killer storyline. John Paul features in the story as he works with Mercedes to expose Breda. In a meeting with Kirkwood, Sutton was informed about his role in the story's finale, which he found exciting. While Mercedes searches Breda's pig farm, John Paul confronts her in the flat. Sutton explained that John Paul is confident as he prepares to speak with Breda, but when he actually sits opposite her, he becomes scared and realises that "he's in a very dangerous position".

=== Departure (2025–2026) ===
In September 2025, reports emerged that Sutton had quit the role. John Paul's exit, described as an "explosive storyline", was announced to air sometime in 2026 as part of the soap's thirtieth anniversary. Sutton last appeared in the role on 23 February 2026, when John Paul left the village to move to Switzerland to live with Matthew-Jesus. Ahead of his departure, Sutton spoke with the Daily Mail about his reasons to exit the role. In the interview, he described the production changes made in 2024 as an "awful time" and that he felt "a lot of the heart of the show had kind of been ripped out" due to the decision.

== Reception ==
AfterElton.com stated that when they did a poll of their readers in 2007 for The 25 Best Gay Characters on Television, John Paul came in at #21. Sutton had not known about the poll, and when told of it stated, "Wow. That's really cool. I don't tend to read too much press and stuff, but I mean I'm aware that we've sold the program to other countries and surfing through the Internet, I'm aware that there are people who really, really watch it. I mean I've heard from the States and there's a couple of people who are in the Far East, actually, who regularly post on forums about me and stuff. And that's just incredible."

Sutton's pairing with actor Guy Burnet, as John Paul and Craig, has also been successful, winning several LGBT awards. Sutton stated that he had spoken to young gay men and had e-mail conversations with people about his character and that it "really" opened his eyes to how difficult it can be and that "there is still prejudice out there and there are still people who are living this." He added, "We call it Middle England way out here. I don't know what you call it", a reference to Middle America.

When asked how popular his John Paul character is in the United Kingdom, Sutton relayed, "It's incredibly, incredibly popular over here, the show. We broadcast an omnibus edition Sunday morning, which every student watches. Right now we're on five nights a week and it's an incredibly popular show, especially with young people." Sutton stated that the reaction he and the cast get is "sometimes a bit frightening, but it's really, really big business". Detailing how recognized he is when walking down the streets of Liverpool or London, Sutton revealed, "Oh, pretty recognizable. Pretty recognizable. My girlfriend gets it worse than I do, actually. She gets pushed out of the way by people trying to get to me sometimes. She's my girlfriend and my official photographer. All these f**king cameras – pardon my language – these camera phones that people have right now. The bane of my existence."

Virgin Media compiled a list of their "Sexiest soap opera couples", they included John Paul and Craig in the list and stated: "The love affair between the Hollyoaks students gripped viewers so much that they started their own campaign for the pair to ride off into the sunset together. They got their wish, and we like to think that Craig and John Paul are now living happily ever after together in Dublin..."

In September 2012, Inside Soap named John Paul and Craig's exit as their number 1 happy ending, "This tentative, tremulous, tortured romance is still regarded by Hollyoaks fans as one of the show's greatest-ever storylines – if not the greatest. So fervently were viewers wishing for a happy ending for gay teenager John Paul and his no-I'm-not-gay-but-maybe-I-am friend Craig, the producer even promised a happy ending in advance. And so, as they flew off to Dublin together, they kissed in front of a holiday poster of a sunset. Aw!"

On John Paul's romantic life, Joe Anderton of Digital Spy in 2019 observed, "John Paul always comes running back to the village, newly single and ready to sleep with every available gay and/or bisexual man around (including those who shouldn't be available)."
