= Tom Vaughan (actor) =

English television actor

- Born: 4 August 1985 (age 40); Stafford, England

Tom Vaughan (born 4 August 1985) is an English television actor, best known for playing the part of Spike, a DJ and love interest of John Paul McQueen in the British Channel 4 soap opera Hollyoaks from March to August 2007.

== Early career ==
Vaughan was born Thomas Ian Clements in Stafford. He attended Blessed William Howard High School in Stafford, England. He has been acting since the age of 8 and appeared in TV ads for Kellogg's Frosties as a child. He trained at the Stafford Gatehouse Youth Theatre.

He has appeared in a number of Shakespeare's works professionally both in open and closed venues, including The Taming of The Shrew, The Comedy of Errors and Richard III.

He has also appeared in a number of short films including Doris The Builder, Tessa, Last Round and Desire To Kill, and had minor parts in Dalziel and Pascoe, Doctors and Emmerdale.

== Other roles ==
From 15 December 2007 to 6 January 2008, Vaughan appeared in pantomime at The Assembly Hall Theatre, Tunbridge Wells as Prince Charming in Cinderella.

On 22 September 2008 he appeared as Terry Webster, the arresting officer in the case of the "Gay Slayer" Colin Ireland in the ITV docudrama Real Crime: Serial Killer on Camera.

He briefly reprised his role as Spike in Hollyoaks in late November 2008.

== Music career ==
Vaughan was a member of The Take That Experience, a Take That tribute act, for 10 years, playing the role of Robbie Williams. During Vaughan's time in The Take That Experience, he performed to thousands of fans across the UK and Europe.

In 2021, Vaughan left The Take That Experience to pursue his solo music career. In June that year, he released a single, "Satellites".

Following this, he released "Killing the Kindness" in August 2021, which hit No. 68 in the UK charts.

== See also ==
- Spike
- Hollyoaks
