= Ste Hay =

- Hollyoaks character
- Portrayed by: Kieron Richardson
- Duration: 2006–present
- First appearance: 10 February 2006
- Introduced by: David Hanson (2006); Bryan Kirkwood (2006, 2007)
- Spin-off appearances: Hollyoaks Later (2025)
- Crossover appearances: Brookside (2025)
In-universe information
- Other names: Ste McQueen
- Occupation: Chief Restaurant owner Drug dealer
- Father: Danny Lomax
- Mother: Pauline Hay
- Stepfather: Terry Hay
- Stepmother: Sam Lomax
- Half-sisters: Leela Lomax; Tegan Lomax; Angela Hay
- Husband: John Paul McQueen (2014–2017); Harry Thompson (2018–2019); James Nightingale (2023–2024); Rex Gallagher (2026)
- Civil partner: Doug Carter (2012–2013)
- Sons: Lucas Hay
- Daughters: Hannah Hay-O'Connor
- Adoptive daughters: Leah Barnes
- Stepsons: Romeo Nightingale
- Grandsons: James Barnes (adoptive)
- Nephews: Daniel Lomax; Noah Dexter; Ro Hutchinson (adoptive)
- Nieces: Peri Lomax; Dee Dee Hutchinson

Ste Hay (also McQueen) is a fictional character from the British soap opera Hollyoaks, played by Kieron Richardson. He debuted on-screen during the episode airing on 10 February 2006. Ste was created by David Hanson and was originally intended to be a short-term character for seven episodes. The following series producer Bryan Kirkwood decided to bring the character back on a permanent basis. As of 2010, Richardson has revealed that he is committed to staying in the serial. In April 2017, Richardson began taking hiatus from the show due to paternity leave, and made a full-time return on 18 December 2017. In October 2019, it was confirmed that Richardson will take a hiatus from the show departing on 20 November 2019. He returned on 3 November 2020.

Ste has been at the centre of several storylines including joyriding, domestic abuse, a baby kidnapping plot, drug dealing, HIV, far right radicalisation and a gay relationship. He was initially portrayed as a "bad boy" type character. Although he changed, producer Lucy Allan wanted him to revert. The issue of domestic violence has been portrayed through the character on two occasions: the first was his violence towards girlfriend Amy Barnes (Ashley Slanina-Davies), and the second when he suffered abuse from his boyfriend Brendan Brady (Emmett J. Scanlan). Richardson and co-star Slanina-Davies both fronted an anti-domestic abuse campaign called "Expect Respect" for Women's Aid. He has subsequent relationships with Rae Wilson (Alice Barlow) and Noah Baxter (Law Thompson) which become subject to love "triangle" storylines involving Brendan. Ste's gay storyline prompted Richardson to come out as gay himself. Its aim was to raise awareness of domestic abuse in a homosexual relationship. Whilst Ste and his storylines have received a mixed reaction from critics, Richardson has been nominated for various awards for his portrayal. During the shows 30th anniversary on 22 October 2025 Ste appeared in an episode that saw Hollyoaks crossover with Brookside.

== Character creation and casting ==
The character of Ste was originally a background character, who was cast by David Hanson for only seven episodes. Upon completion of his initial short stint, new producer Bryan Kirkwood decided to bring the character back for another handful of episodes, in October 2006, in which Ste fled the scene of a car accident involving Amy Barnes (Ashley Slanina-Davies). Following positive viewer feedback after this second stint, Kirkwood asked Richardson to reprise the role on a permanent basis, beginning 26 September 2007.

In 2010 speculation arose that Richardson would leave the show, due to his participation in ITV ice skating competition Dancing on Ice. Richardson said "I'm not leaving, I'm staying put". He added his participation in the reality television series was for "fun", and stating: "I still want to stay at Hollyoaks and progress in my career there" because he did not think he was a good enough actor to pursue other projects. However, he later revealed he was not sure executive producer Paul Marquess would renew his contract. In November 2010 Richardson commented on his future with the show, branding it a new era and thankful to be part of it. Richardson stated: "Marquess loved everything I've been doing and wanted to keep me on. I'm hoping to stick with the show no matter what."

== Development ==
=== Characterisation ===
When Ste was introduced on Hollyoaks, he was introduced as a violent and rebellious teenager who was often in trouble. He bullied several of his peers, including Josh Ashworth (Sonny Flood), Jamie "Fletch" Fletcher (Sam Darbyshire) and Nicole Owen (Ciara Janson). His troublesome personality continued as he became a drug dealer, stole money and began hitting Amy. During 2009 Ste's persona improved when he became a single father to Lucas Hay (Jude) and Amy's daughter to a previous relationship, Leah (Jessica Croft-Lane) after she developed post-natal depression. Ste began working in restaurant Il Gnosh to earn money for his children, showing that the character had matured.

In 2010 Richardson revealed that executive producer Lucy Allan was going to return Ste to his "bad" ways. Richardson said that Ste had portrayed the whole "bad thing" and mellowed. He felt Ste was emulating fellow character Tony Hutchinson (Nick Pickard) because Ste was "running a restaurant, camping it up like him and talking like him". Allan wanted to change that and see him regain some old habits. These changes did not happen because Allan quit her position soon after.

Richardson later told Inside Soap that he hated Ste when he first joined the show, adding: "When he came into the show Ste was a bit of a skater boy and I hated that." Richardson would recite his lines in "a sinister way and do under-the-eyebrows stuff", which Richardson felt inspired the writers to develop Ste's character more deeply.

=== Domestic violence and fatherhood ===
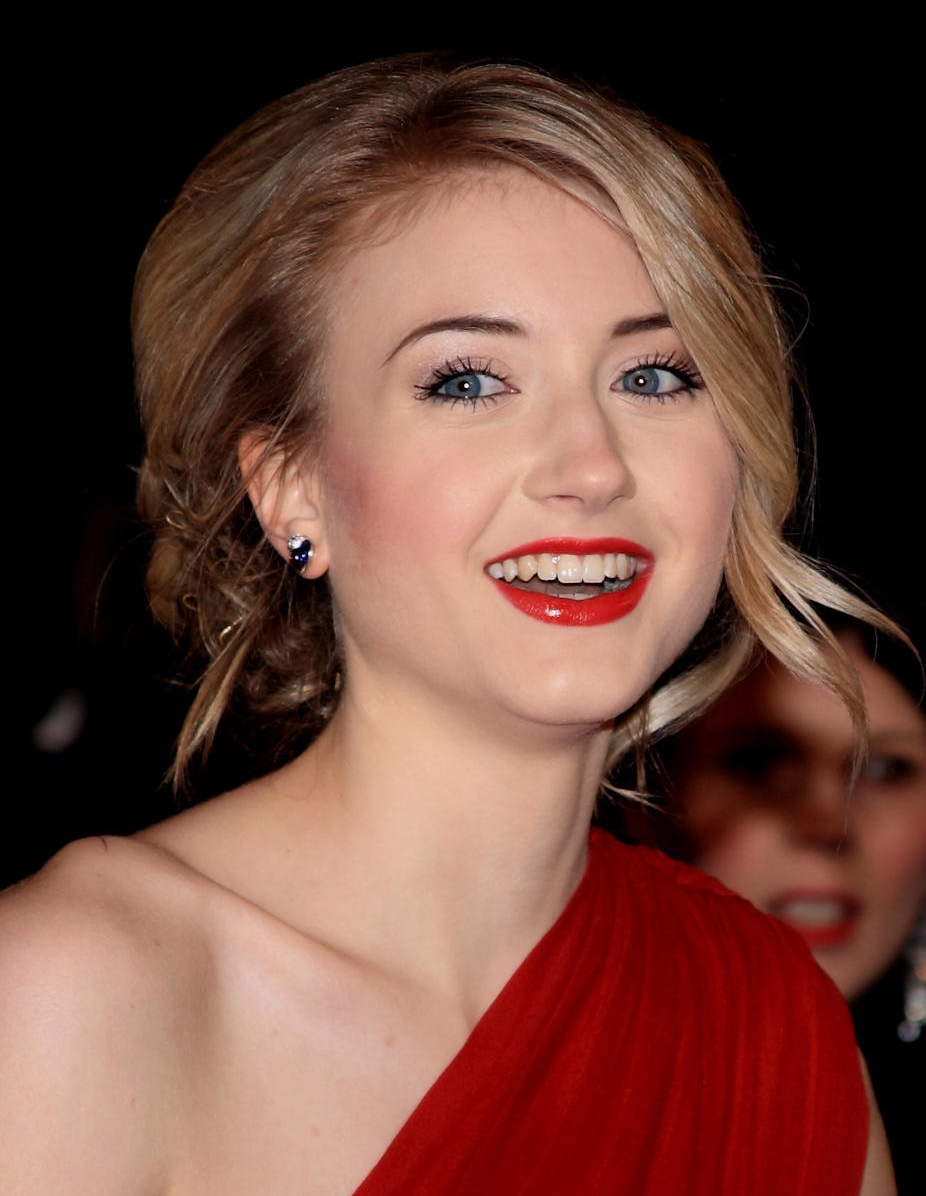
Ashley Slanina-Davies (pictured) plays Ste's girlfriend Amy Barnes, the victim of Ste's domestic violence.

Returning, later in 2007, Ste and Amy eventually got back together. The pair moved into their own flat, to the dismay of Amy's father Mike Barnes (Tony Hirst). Despite this, Ste became increasingly violent and started to hit Amy, on one occasion even cutting off her ponytail. Slanina-Davis raised money from hair cut during the scene in aid the cancer charity CLIC Sargent. At this time, Amy became pregnant, but was unsure whether to keep the baby. Speaking about 2008 as a whole for Ste and Amy, producer Bryan Kirkwood said he was proud of the way Richardson had portrayed Ste in a sympathetic manner so viewers could understand - but not condone his behaviour. He thought he and Slanina-Davies delivered brilliant performances portraying the "reality of so many 16-17-year-olds", struggling to make a life for themselves. He felt some of their scenes were "downright shocking". Eventually, Amy decides to accept the help of her friends and family and leaves Ste for abusing her.

Whilst the storyline aired, Richardson and Slanina-Davies fronted a charity campaign called "Expect Respect" in order to combat domestic violence. At the time Richardson released a statement opining domestic violence affects many young people in any form of life. He stated he could imagine "how frightening it would be to have him as a boyfriend" and condemned his "violence and bullying" because it is always unacceptable." In conjunction with the storyline's broadcast, Channel 4 offered viewers an online advice facility complete with helplines.

During April 2009 Amy gave birth to Lucas and subsequently left due to post-natal depression. Ste was left looking after both Lucas and Amy's daughter Leah. A couple, Abi Raven (Elaine Glover) and Daniel Raven (Chris Hargreaves) befriended Ste and tried to convince him that he was a good father and that he did not need Amy in their lives. However, Abi and Daniel planned to kidnap Lucas, at first in order to keep him and then later on to give him to another family. Richardson expressed to Digital Spy his pleasure with this storyline, saying, "It's getting quite dark." He was also shocked with its entertaining and unexpected ending." When the storyline came to its climax, Abi and Daniel tried to take Lucas, but they were stopped.

Ste told Amy's father Mike to look after Lucas and Leah in the aftermath of the baby plot because he didn't think he was a good father. Richardson reported that he enjoyed working with Jude and Jessica Croft-Lane, the young actors who played Lucas and Leah. He reported that Jude was camera shy and liked to play with camera equipment during filming and that he told Croft-Lane that his name was actually Ste. Richardson concluded the storyline was different and he felt it gave him a chance to showcase his acting abilities.

=== Homosexual domestic violence ===
During an interview on This Morning, Kieron Richardson revealed that he was gay and that Ste would explore his sexuality and come out as gay after embarking on a dangerous affair with his boss Brendan Brady (Emmett J. Scanlan). Ste saw a nicer side to Brendan and they formed an "unusual friendship," which eventually led to having a wild lads night out and a drunken kiss. Brendan rejected Ste, giving into passion later, they kiss again. But the storyline took a dark twist when Ste was beaten badly.

During an interview, series producer Paul Marquess, he described it as a long running storyline, adding: "It is dark to begin with, the lessons that Ste learns are ultimately positive and life affirming." He also felt it was about not "being afraid of who you are" and Ste was "refreshingly accepting" of his feelings towards a man. Richardson revealed he was shocked to discover the details of the plot. He felt it was interesting to see how Ste coped with the being the victim of domestic violence.

Ste comes out to ex-girlfriend Amy first. During their conversation Ste reveals Amy was the only girl he really had feelings for and that his confusion over his sexuality was not the reason for him abusing her during their relationship. Ste is very relieved by Amy's good reaction. Amy is the one who discovers that Brendan is hitting Ste and she tells Ste to break it off, reminding him of how it was when he was hitting her.

"I think it's nice that the fans have just accepted Ste being gay straight away, because I was worried that it wouldn't be believable because of him being a real straight character in the past and a bit of a scally. But I think the nice thing is that Danny Miller has portrayed a scally-type character who's gay in Emmerdale, so I think people have accepted it a lot more."

— Richardson discussing viewer reaction to Ste's storyline. (2010)

Richardson admitted his initial fears of the portrayal because he felt it was a taboo subject. He had difficulties portraying it initially, this was because he was not familiar with the subject. "The storyline had not been tackled in British soap opera before and Richardson felt Ste was "making television history". He then explained how the storyline differs from other soap operas because "Ste doesn't question his sexuality and it's not about a struggle – it's about domestic abuse in a gay relationship." Richardson also stated because of the plots dark nature, he hoped viewers would be "drawn into it". He branded the storyline as unpredictable because viewers never know if Brendan was going kiss or hit Ste.

A spokesperson for Hollyoaks confirmed that Ste didn't realise "how much power and control Brendan was wielding over him". This was because Ste was still coming to terms with his sexuality. Ste felt a connection he never felt before because he hadn't had another male partner. Brendan manipulated Ste into believing he was to blame for Brendan's anger. The representative said this was why he ended up apologising. The storyline also aimed to shock viewers with the "dark depths" Brendan would go to in order to control Ste. Marquess later stated that Brendan's past would be explained and that everyone should remember it was Ste who used to hit Amy first, adding: "So it's a dark and interwoven story made all the more complicated by the introduction of a new love interest for Ste".

=== Relationship with Noah Baxter ===
In early 2011 Marquess revealed that Ste would have a new boyfriend. This would help create another "classic triangle" storyline. It was then revealed that new gay character Noah Baxter (Law Thompson) would befriend Ste. Noah's friend Cindy Cunningham (Stephanie Waring) decides to help the pair start a relationship. Waring said Cindy does not care about Ste and Noah and she sees them as "the only gays in the village". Waring concluded that she thrives off the attention and gossip their romance generates for her. However Richardson said that despite his new relationship he is still "madly" in love with Brendan. Ultimately he stated "He may care for Noah, but he will always run back to Brendan".

=== Relationship with Doug Carter ===
It was announced in early 2012 that Doug will began his relationship with Ste. Doug later enters into business with him and they become good friends. As their friendship grows, Doug begins to develop feelings for Ste. Richardson told television host Myleene Klass that there was a possibility of a relationship developing between Doug and Ste. Doug helps Ste into online dating and develops "feelings" when Ste goes on a date with Adam (Alex Morgan). Richardson explained that there is confusion as to whether Doug is jealous of Ste dating a guy - or just jealous that his friend is being taken from him. Brennan told Alison Slade from TVTimes that Doug wants to "regain control of his life" after seeing Ste and Adam on their date. Doug decides to "go back to something familiar" and sleeps with Texas.

Brennan told a columnist from Soaplife that it was not "difficult to see why these two would find solace in one another". This was because of the commonalities between them - a "strong friendship", a history with Brendan and endured "tough times". Doug's past romances were with females; with the pivotal one being Jenny. Brennan explained that Hollyoaks were not just "turning Doug gay". Doug rethinks what type of love he had for Jenny, but she was "definitely" very important to him. He thought that the storyline was plausible because Doug was only twenty years old and people can discover their sexuality in later life.

Richardson told a writer from TV Buzz that Doug and Ste would not solely be "another love story" because Brendan will be involved. On their dynamic the actor said that "they put each other in their place and I think Doug stops Ste from being so moody and miserable all the time." He also thought that the two men share a "really cute relationship". Brennan and Richardson often call each other outside work to discuss varied ways of playing their scenes.

Ste and Brendan are known by fans under the portmanteau of "Stendan"; while Ste and Doug are referred to as "Stug". The storyline divided the audience as they supported either side. Richardson explained that Stendan fans were "obsessed" with idea of Ste reconciling with Brendan and the Stug fans wanted the opposite. He added that the two groups had "this little war" developing on social networking website Twitter.

Brennan himself is gay and he told Jenna Good from Reveal that unlike Doug, it had never been an issue - but there were certain aspects of Doug's persona that he related to and sympathised with. Brennan is protective of Doug and made slight changes to the storyline. He said that because sexuality is personal to him, he wanted stereotypes and clichés to be avoided and do the story some "justice". The actor wanted Doug to find happiness because had a "very difficult" year. Though his story needed plenty of "hiccups and bumps along the way" to avoid boring television.

=== Biological father and arrival of his paternal family ===
In 2013 it was announced that Stephen Billington had joined the cast as Danny Lomax. A writer from the Hollyoaks website described Danny as "charismatic, charming, pretty-sweeting-captivating". He is also a "thoughtful, intelligent, articulate and well respected member of the teaching profession". Danny is liked by his students because of his youthful approach to life. He also has a "cheeky twinkle in his eyes" which charm everyone. Billington told the writer that can relate to Danny because he also teaches and gets along with young people. But he warned that Danny has a different side to his personality. Viewers will not discover this until later on because it will be revealed over time. Billington added that "you'll still like him, but he's much more complex than he first appears."

In an unpublicised storyline twist, Danny is revealed to be Ste's biological father. Billington told Kilkelly that he was "absolutely thrilled" with his storyline and that he was always aware of the development. He explained that Danny had attempted to make contact on many occasions but Ste's mother, Pauline Hay (Jane Hogarth) prevented it. Billington also warned that Danny had more secrets yet to be disclosed and was confident that Danny would be able to charm the audience with his persona. The actor added that Danny is "definitely not a bad person. He's just a bit of a free spirit and he likes getting his own way. Perhaps he's a bit greedy too, but when it comes down to it, he's a fundamentally good guy." Ste's stepmother finally introduced to the series with Lizzie Roper casting was announced on 19 August, shortly after she made an appearance in E4's first look broadcast as his father wife, Sam Lomax. Producers did not reveal Roper's casting beforehand as they wanted her character to be a surprise for viewers.

Follow by the announced of his arrival, Ste's paternal half-siblings join the series with the arrival of Danny and Sam's three daughters, Leela (Kirsty-Leigh Porter), Peri (Ruby O'Donnell) and Tegan (Jessica Ellis), however a year later Peri is revealed to be his niece and Leela's daughter.

=== Feud with Ryan Knight ===
On 22 May 2016 it was announced that Blue singer Duncan James join the cast to play as Ryan Knight. The character is later reveal to be his ex-girlfriend Amy Barnes's (Ashley Slanina-Davies) fiancé following her return to the show and will be "polar opposite" to Ste. His would "go head-to-head" with Ste for a storyline tackling blended family life. A show spokesperson teased that "viewers will be torn between luckless Ste and a man who on paper is a better example for his children but not their dad.".

In January 2017, it was revealed that Amy would be departing later in the year in a "whodunit" storyline which would see the character killed off after being murdered. Ste is the prime suspect because of Amy taking Leah and Lucas away from him especially Amy's parents Mike and Kathy for whom they blamed him for abusing Amy. His accused storyline of Amy death leads the star Richardson to take a small breaks from the show due to paternity leave, and made a full-time return on 18 December 2017. However, in October, it was reveal that Ryan is the one who killed Amy. Ste would later discover Ryan's actions and begins feud with him, despite they sleep together. James' departure was announced October 2017. Ryan's last episode aired on 7 May 2018. In his very last scene, it appeared Ryan had drowned in a river. On 8 May 2018, it was confirmed Ryan had drowned when his body was discovered.

=== Radicalisation and far-right extremism ===
In November 2018, it was announced that Ste would be targeted and groomed by the newcomer Jonny Baxter (Ray Quinn). It was later confirmed that Jonny and Ste would be the focus on a radicalisation and far-right extremism storyline. The story sees Jonny target and groom Ste after discovering his hatred for the Maalik family, who are Muslim, however this begins when Dr. Misbah Maalik (Harvey Virdi) fails to save Ste's half-sister Tegan Lomax (Jessica Ellis) following injuries from a storm, and she dies as a result. Quinn explained that Jonny is sent by the radicalisation group to recruit people. He added that Ste is an ideal person to recruit since he is "very vulnerable and low on his self-esteem". Jonny then cares for Ste "emotionally and financially", growing his self-confidence with an underlying agenda. Executive producer Bryan Kirkwood explained that he decided to tackle the issue after discovering how radicalisation groups work. He added that the story is "a modern story about protecting young people online". Richardson was pleased to be undertaking the storyline alongside Quinn. Quinn, Richardson and Hollyoaks storyliners and researchers worked alongside advisors and charities when creating and developing the storyline. One advisor, Jamie Bartlett, believed that it was important that extremism was explored so that the public knew how extremists operate. The charity EXIT UK agreed that it was good to highlight the taboo topic and offered support and guidance to the cast and crew.

== Reception ==
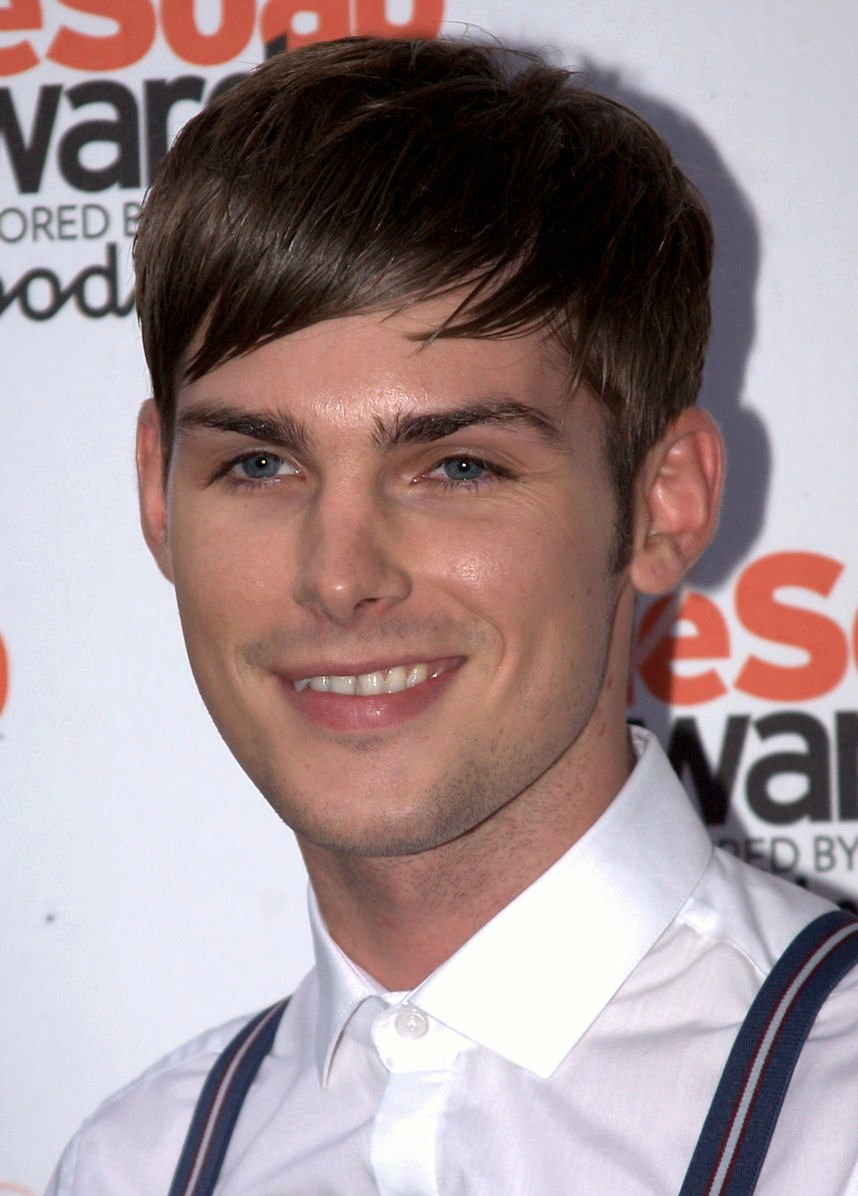
Kieron Richardson (pictured) has been nominated for several awards for his portrayal of Ste.

Richardson has been nominated for several awards for his portrayal of Ste. During the 2009 British Soap Awards, he was nominated for "Villain of the Year". He was nominated for the same award in 2008 and at the 2011 awards he was nominated for "Best Actor". Richardson was a nominee for the "Best Actor" award at the Inside Soap Awards during 2010, and was nominated for 'Best Serial Drama Performance' in the 2011 National Television Awards. At the 2011 All About Soap Bubble Awards Ste, Brendan and Rae won the award for "Best Love Triangle". At the 2011 Inside Soap Awards he was nominated for "Best Actor" and "Best Dramatic Performance". He was again nominated in the category of "Serial Drama Performance" at the 2012 National Television Awards. At the 2012 Inside Soap Awards Richardson was nominated for "Best Actor". In August 2017, Richardson was longlisted for Best Actor at the Inside Soap Awards. He did not progress to the viewer-voted shortlist. In 2025, Richardson received a nomination in the "Soaps - Best Actor" category the Digital Spy Reader Awards.

Holy Soap opined Ste's most memorable moment stating: "Sadly, it's beating up girlfriend Amy." The fatherhood and baby snatch storyline received mixed reviews from viewers. Digital Spy posted a poll asking readers whether they thought the plot was anticlimactic. 76.6% of voters thought it was truly anticlimactic, whilst the rest thought otherwise. Richardson was also longlisted for "Best Actor" at the 2025 Inside Soap Awards.

After Richardson came out on This Morning, Dennis Ayers, writing for gay men's news website AfterElton.com, criticised the revelation, believing it to be for promotional purposes only. Whilst acknowledging Ste as being a "violent bully, a domestic abuser, and a single father", Ayers could see nothing in Ste's "dark past hinted that he might be gay." In spite of his criticism, he praised Richardson for coming out as gay. Anthony D. Langford, also writing for AfterElton, who avidly followed the plot, felt shocked when he witnessed Brendan attacking Ste. He moped there was worse to come and found it compelling viewing. He also did not perceive it as a romantic story stating: "Ste and Brendan's scenes do have an element of sexual allure since the actors have chemistry, but there's too much darkness and manipulation on the edges of every scene to make real romance even possible". He also gave credit to the show for its slow build up over a few months. After Rae became pregnant All About Soap said: "Crikey, at this rate Mr Hay will soon be giving Walford's Jack Branning a run for his money for the Most fertile Man in Soapland award!"

The Liverpool Daily Post said "You know you're not flavour of the month when even Ste Hay looks down his nose at you." In 2024, after a storyline which saw Ste run over and kill Ella Richardson (Erin Palmer), Daniel Kilkelly from Digital Spy called Ste a "Fan favourite" and wrote, "After a couple of years playing a more comic role in the soap, it's exciting to see long-serving cast member Kieron Richardson get a chance to show what he's made of again."
