= Carla Chases =

English actress

Carla Chases (born 17 February 1984 in Buckinghamshire, England), is an English actress, best known for playing anorexic model Melissa Hurst in the Channel 4 teen soap opera Hollyoaks. The storyline broke new ground as it was the first time a character had died from an eating disorder in a soap.

Chases has also appeared in stage and other television productions such as Spaghetti Arms, Scratch My Back, Fletcher Road, Truth in the Rumour, The Party, Nothing Personal and Jhoom Bhara Bara Jhoom.

Chases is also a skilled contemporary dancer and a mezzo-soprano singer.

Most recently she was in a Ryvita advert from 2010 to 2011.
