= Sam Darbyshire =

English actor (b. 1989)

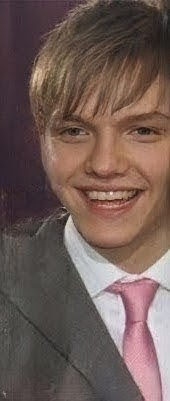
- Darbyshire in 2007
- Born: 26 March 1989 (age 37)
- Occupation: Actor
- Years active: 2005–present

Sam Darbyshire (born 26 March 1989) is an English television actor best known for his role as Jamie "Fletch" Fletcher on the Channel 4 soap opera Hollyoaks. He has also appeared in several advertisements and had a small role in Coronation Street. He was a member of a local youth theatre group in Wigan, Willpower Youth Theatre, near his childhood home in Standish, Greater Manchester. In his final year of secondary school, Darbyshire was involved in a production of the musical Grease. He is also the brother of renowned AP Faye Darbyshire.

Darbyshire attended Winstanley College.
