= Leo Valentine =

Fictional character from Hollyoaks

- Hollyoaks character
- Portrayed by: Brian Bovell
- Duration: 2006–2010
- First appearance: 28 July 2006
- Last appearance: 13 August 2010
- Introduced by: Bryan Kirkwood
In-universe information
- Occupation: Janitor
- Wife: Diane Valentine (until 2006)
- Sons: Calvin Valentine; Sonny Valentine; Danny Valentine
- Daughters: Sasha Valentine; Lauren Valentine
- Granddaughters: Kathleen-Angel McQueen

Leo Valentine is a fictional character from the British Channel 4 soap opera Hollyoaks, played by Brian Bovell. He made his first appearance in July 2006. The character was axed in 2010 and made his last appearance that August.

== Development ==
In March 2010, it was announced that Leo was one of 16 characters to be axed from the show; he left in August 2010.

== Storylines ==
Leo arrives in Hollyoaks to look after his children after their mother, Diane Valentine's (Pauline Black) death. Leo begins a casual sexual relationship with Myra McQueen (Nicole Barber-Lane). Leo is disappointed when his son Sonny Valentine (Devon Anderson) leaves home to live with his aunt. On 6 September 2007, Leo's former girlfriend, Valerie Holden (Samantha Giles), turns up with his illegitimate children Danny (David Judge) and Lauren Valentine (Dominique Jackson). Valerie leaves her children with Leo and leaves for abroad. Leo's other children Calvin (Ricky Whittle) and Sasha (Nathalie Emmanuel) are horrified to discover their father cheated on their mother and that they have two more siblings. A year later, Valerie returns and begins a short relationship with Leo until she kisses Calvin and leaves.

In 2009, after Warren Fox's (Jamie Lomas) death, his foster brother Spencer Gray (Darren John Langford) moves in with the Valentines. Leo dislikes Spencer's unruly attitude and tries to convince Calvin to put him in a care home where he can be properly looked after. Calvin eventually does so. Leo discovers that Calvin left Warren to die and is forced to kick him out due to Sasha's upset over the situation. However, things get worse when Leo then discovers that Lauren is pregnant, unaware that she had lied to Spencer in order to con him out of his inheritance. Leo threatens Lauren's boyfriend Gaz Bennett (Joel Goonan) when it appears he is the father. Lauren then admits she made up the pregnancy. Calvin is shot dead by Theresa McQueen (Jorgie Porter) on his wedding day, and Leo is devastated. To make matters worse, Lauren collapses and falls down the stairs at The Loft during an argument with Sasha about her scheme to fleece Spencer out of his inheritance. When she is admitted to hospital, it is revealed that she is suffering from a life-threatening blood clot. Valerie then returns to take her back to Spain with her. Lauren decides to move to Spain as Leo gets a job in London. Lauren then realises how much her father will miss her, so she decides to stay with him. A goodbye party is held for the Valentines, as Lauren, Valerie and Spencer all announce they are also coming to London. The Valentines then leave in August 2010.

In July 2014, Sonny (now played by Aaron Fontaine) informs his current fiancée Carmel McQueen (Gemma Merna) that Leo has provided him with a financial deposit for the two of them to purchase a household of their own in the village.

== Reception ==
Gareth McLean of Radio Times has branded Leo as useless. A writer from Inside Soap called Leo a "disgraced dad". In 2008, BBC News noted how healthcare firm Bupa placed Leo on their list of the ten unhealthiest soap opera characters due to him consuming "too much alcohol", with the Bupa believing that he and the other characters should "hammer home health messages" by showing the consequences of the unhealthy lifestyle.
