= Fletch (Hollyoaks) =

Fictional character from Hollyoaks

- Hollyoaks character
- Portrayed by: Sam Darbyshire
- Duration: 2005–2008
- First appearance: 21 October 2005
- Last appearance: 21 August 2008
- Introduced by: David Hanson
In-universe information
- Occupation: Student
- Mother: Nikki Fletcher
- Grandmothers: Rose
- Aunts: Suzanne Ashworth
- First cousins: Rhys Ashworth; Hannah Ashworth; Josh Ashworth; Jack Osborne; Francine Osborne

Jamie "Fletch" Fletcher is a fictional character from the British soap opera Hollyoaks, played by Sam Darbyshire. The character made his first on-screen appearance on 21 October 2005. Fletch was originally a recurring character and Darbyshire was promoted to the regular cast in 2007 by executive producer Bryan Kirkwood. The character is introduced into the series as a student studying at the local school and a member of the show's Ashworth family. Fletch is characterised as "easily led" and a solitary figure who "enjoys his own company". Writers created a double act between him and Josh Ashworth (Sonny Flood).

Fletch is also included in a love rivalry plot in which Michaela McQueen (Hollie-Jay Bowes) and Sasha Valentine (Nathalie Emmanuel) compete for his love. Fletch's prominent storyline is his drug addiction and writers developed the storyline over several months. The story documented Fletch and his girlfriend Sasha's descent into addiction, beginning with regular cannabis use and their later reliance on the drug heroin. Darbyshire has described scenes in which Fletch injects himself with drugs in front of his family as "harrowing". Fletch made his final on-screen appearance on 21 August 2008.

== Development ==
=== Characterisation and early stories ===
Fletch is introduced into the series as a student studying for his GCSE exams at Hollyoaks Comprehensive school. His first name is Jamie but is writers used his nickname Fletch in reference to him on-screen. Writers created an on-screen partnership between him and his best friend Josh Ashworth (Sonny Flood). On the official Hollyoaks website, Fletch is described as having "an uncanny knack of forever finding himself at the centre of his mate's pranks." They added that he does "secretly relish the enjoyment" of being the subject of their jokes. Fletch is also characterised as "easily led" and "enjoys his own company". He is "perceived as a geek by his peers" due to his "passion for reading" books.

Fletch's initial stories are short and unserious. In his first six months he shared his screen time with Josh and his Grandfather Bill Ashworth (John Jardine). After forming his double act with Josh, writers portrayed them concocting money making scams. They were also shown hoaxing other characters such as Hannah Ashworth (Emma Rigby) and Nancy Hayton (Jessica Fox).

In 2007, Darbyshire was promoted to the regular cast by executive producer Bryan Kirkwood as his screen time increased as part of his more prominent storylines. Fletch began appearing more frequently alongside the characters of Josh, Amy Barnes (Ashley Slanina-Davies), Michaela McQueen (Hollie-Jay Bowes) and they form a band called "The Baby Diegos". Writers created a romance rivalry story between Fletch, Michaela and their friend Sasha Valentine (Nathalie Emmanuel). A Hollyoaks publicist told Kris Green from Digital Spy that "both Micheala and Sasha have got the hots for Fletch so he has a tough choice to make. Will he break someone's heart or will he get the best of both worlds?"

=== Drug addiction ===
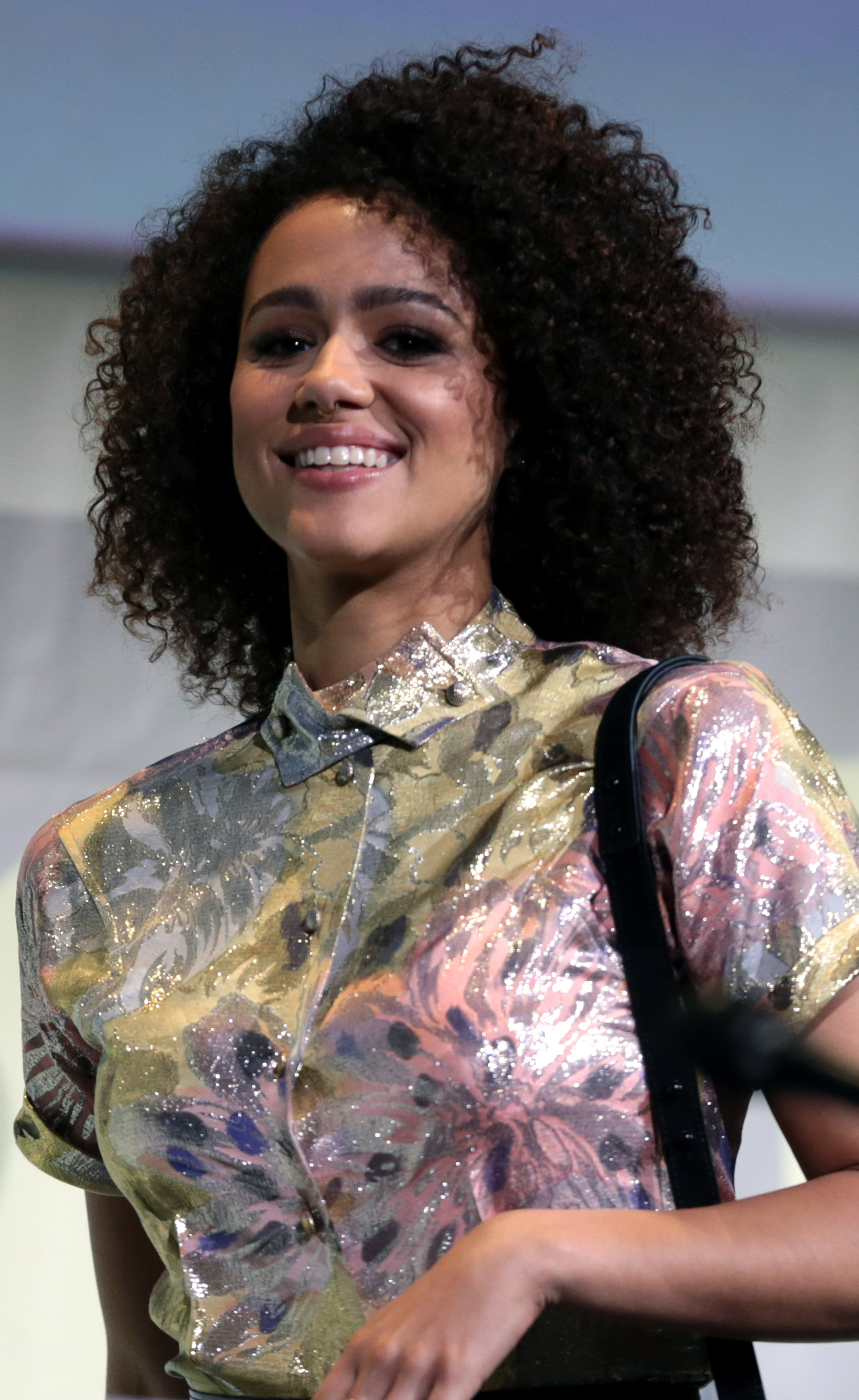
Writers developed a drug addiction storyline for Fletch and his girlfriend Sasha Valentine, played by Nathalie Emmanuel (pictured).

Writers created a drug addiction storyline for Fletch and Sasha in which they take heroin. Fletch first gains access to heroin when Myra McQueen (Nicole Barber-Lane) loses a packet of the drug. Fletch finds the heroin and decides to keep it. Writers used Fletch's relationship with Sasha as a catalyst to begin their descent into drug addiction. When Sasha and Fletch are caught in a compromising position, her brother, Calvin Valentine (Ricky Whittle) presumes they have had sex. He is angry with Sasha and chases her up some stairs. Sasha falls and hurts her face as an argument ensues between them. Emmanuel told an Inside Soap reporter that Calvin is "so mad" with Sasha and Fletch that his reaction causes her to move out. Sasha goes to stay with Fletch in Amy and Ste Hay's (Kieron Richardson) council flat. Sasha then discovers that Fletch never disposed of the heroin Myra had lost. Emmanuel explained that Sasha is initially "livid" with Fletch for keeping it. She soon becomes tempted and "her curiosity gets the better of her". She added it is ultimately Fletch who convinces her to take the drug with him. This is in line with Sasha's characterisation, rather than Fletch's, as Emmanuel noted her character is "she is too easily led astray" by men. The two characters are then depicted experiences the effects of heroin for the first time. When Ste realises they have taken heroin he throws them out of the flat. Emmanuel added that "Ste really takes the moral high ground" regarding Fletch and Sasha's behaviour. Fletch and Sasha have sex for the first time and they are caught by her father Leo Valentine (Brian Bovell) and his partner Valerie Holden (Samantha Giles).

Writers developed Fletch's drug addiction story over the following six months. His behaviour becomes so problematic, Fletch's parents disown him and his relatives, the Ashworth family decide to help him. His aunt Suzanne Ashworth (Suzanne Hall) and uncle Neville Ashworth (Jim Millea) decide to let Fletch live with them. After they find him injecting heroin in they resort to drastic tactics and lock him in a bedroom. They plan to put Fletch through the withdrawal process and make him go cold turkey. Darbyshire told an Inside Soap reporter that "Fletch is gutted when the Ashworths lock him up, they even bring in a bucket for him to pee in, and he's like 'No, way!'." Darbyshire believed that Fletch understands Suzanne and Neville's "tough-love approach" is "for his own good". He thought the scenes in which Fletch injects himself with heroin in front of his family was "harrowing stuff". Darbyshire added that Fletch just wants more heroin despite the Ashworth's attempts to help.

Josh is not supportive of Fletch during the story and is unsympathetic. Writers used the character Hannah, to convey Fletch's "isolated" plight to viewers. Hannah is Fletch's cousin and she was featured in a storyline exploring anorexia. Scenes were created in which Fletch and Hannah share their experiences and better understand each other's problems. Fletch feels isolated and Hannah recognises his suffering because of her illness. Darbyshire branded the scenes "emotional" and revealed that "Hannah likens Fletch's drug problem to her battle with anorexia, and they both start crying. Hannah feels for him, so she unlocks the door for a hug." The event is interrupted by Josh, who startles Fletch and he makes his escape. Fletch also accidentally hits Hannah in the face while escaping. Darbyshire believed that Fletch panics in the moment but his actions ruin any chance of a recovery. He added "that's the last straw, and the Ashworths wash their hands of him. I really don't think Fletch has much hope now." Darbyshire concluded that "things are going to get a lot tougher" as Fletch's drug story progressed.

In his final scenes, Fletch fails his exams and mugs Sasha, stealing her bag to buy drugs and absconds from Hollyoaks village. Following Darbyshire's departure as Fletch, Emmanuel was asked about a potential return. She told Green that she would like to explore what happened to Fletch further, but had reservations about a return because Fletch "had no one" when he left and "he even mugged Sasha".

== Storylines ==
Fletch is best friends with his cousin Josh and is a student at Hollyoaks Comprehensive School. He spends much time conjuring up money-making schemes. Fletch supports Amy during an argument with Michaela and Ste. Fletch accuses Ste of having romantic feelings for Amy. Fletch is involved in a car accident involving Josh, Michaela, Amy and Ste and is arrested for joyriding. Fletch writes a song for Hannah's birthday party and later forms a band with Michaela, Josh, Amy and Sasha. Sasha and Michaela begin to argue about spending time with Fletch. Fletch goes to a party and smokes cannabis given to him by Ste. Fletch likes it and continues to smoke it on numerous occasions. Fletch's drug taking annoys Sasha who refuses to spend time with him. Sasha's father Leo and his girlfriend Valarie call Sasha boring and her self confidence issues result in Sasha joining Fletch to smoke cannabis. Fletch and Sasha then take amphetamines at another party. They enjoy the euphoria the drug offers them but struggle with the come down the morning after.

Fletch finds heroin that Myra loses and hides it in his school locker. Mrs Webster carries out a drugs sweep at the school. He asks Sasha for help in disposing of the drug, but she is shocked that he has acquired heroin. Sasha sets the fire alarm off to create a decoy and Sasha orders Fletch to destroy the drugs. He ignores her and she finds it in his pockets on another occasion. They later decide to try it but agree to doing it once. They then begin having casual sex and taking heroin more frequently and become addicted. They begin stealing to fund their drug addiction. Fletch buys heroin from Ste and uses in his flat. Amy is shocked to find Fletch high around her daughter, Leah Barnes (Jessica Croft-Lane). Sasha finds Fletch high and he breaks-up with her. She lets Ste inject her with heroin but she overdoses and is taken into hospital. Fletch visits her to apologise but Leo bans him from visiting. Ste refuses to sell drugs to Fletch because of Sasha's overdose, which causes Fletch to become desperate. When Sasha is discharged, she asks Fletch for more drugs but he suggests they stop using.

Sasha's brother Danny Valentine (David Judge) convinces Fletch to stop seeing Sasha. Fletch later witnesses Sasha kissing Justin Burton (Chris Fountain) and confronts her. They reconcile and buy more drugs. Sasha and Fletch steal Nancy Hayton's (Jessica Fox) purse and money to buy more drugs. Hannah invites Fletch around to the Ashworth's for a birthday lunch. His party is ruined by Rhys Ashworth's (Andrew Moss) return and Fletch leaves feeling ignored by his family. Fletch and Sasha use Leo's janitor keys to trespass at the school, where they take more drugs. Sasha fools her father into giving her money and they buy more drugs. They then begin borrowing money from Nige Foster. Fletch attends his exams high and is automatically failed as a result. He then steals money from Drive 'n' Buy, to repay Nige. Josh catches Fletch and forces him to return it or he will report him to the police. Josh refuses to help Fletch and he attacks Myra and steals her bag but is annoyed to find no money inside it. Fletch and Sasha stole a laptop from the head teacher's office to try and sell it to buy heroin.

Fletch is shocked when he discovers Sasha has been having sex with Nige in exchange for their drugs. He breaks-up with Sasha and his parents disown him for his recent behaviour. Fletch asks Nige for help and agrees to sell drugs for him. He becomes homeless and begins begging on the streets. Josh takes pity on Fletch and he goes to stay with the Ashworth's. Fletch continues to beg for drugs and steals Josh's laptop. He then returns to the house and injects himself with heroin. He went up to Josh's room and injected himself with heroin. Josh, Neville and Suzanne are horrified to find Fletch lying on the floor unconscious. They lock him in the room to attempt to get him off the drugs. Hannah takes pity on Fletch and they discuss her being sectioned with anorexia. She understands his upset and being locked up against his will and lets him out. Josh attempts to stop Fletch from leaving and Fletch accidentally hits Hannah.

Fletch becomes homeless once again and quits school. Fletch asks Sasha to move to London with him. He then witnesses Niall Rafferty (Barry Sloane) pushing Tina Reilly (Leah Hackett), who is pregnant, down some stairs. Fletch is the sole witness to the crime so Niall accuses Fletch of being Tina's attacker. Despite his pleas of innocence, no one believes Fletch. Carmel McQueen (Gemma Merna) attempts to arrest Fletch, but he escapes. Niall threatens Fletch and he disappears. He later returns to Sixth Form and visits Sasha, who has now overcome her addiction. He claims to no longer be using heroin but she spots injection marks on him. Fletch then mugs Sasha, absconds and does not return again.

== Reception ==
Writers from soap opera magazine Inside Soap are not fans of the Fletch and Josh duo, of this they opined that "the 'comedy duo' thing is wearing thin – the writers should ditch them and give more screen time to Justin and Becca!"
