= Carmel McQueen =

Fictional character from Hollyoaks

- Hollyoaks character
- Portrayed by: Gemma Merna
- Duration: 2006–2014, 2026
- First appearance: 22 August 2006
- Last appearance: 18 February 2026
- Introduced by: Bryan Kirkwood (2006); Hannah Cheers (2026)
- Spin-off appearances: Hollyoaks Later (2009–2010); Hollyoaks: King of Hearts (2010); Hollyoaks Favourites (2020)
In-universe information
- Other names: Carmel Valentine
- Occupation: Beautician; PCSO; Nun; Gym instructor Hairdresser
- Family: McQueen
- Father: Ricky Bowen
- Mother: Myra McQueen
- Sisters: Michaela McQueen
- Half-brothers: Niall Rafferty; John Paul McQueen; Richard Bowen
- Half-sisters: Jacqui McQueen; Mercedes McQueen; Tina Reilly; Carmina McQueen
- Husband: Calvin Valentine (2008–2010)
- Grandmothers: Marlena McQueen
- Uncles: Louis McQueen
- Aunts: Kathleen McQueen; Reenie McQueen
- Nephews: Max McQueen; Bobby Costello; Gabriel McQueen; Matthew McQueen
- Nieces: Maria-Carmella McQueen; Maria-Gabriella Fox-McQueen; Phoebe McQueen (adoptive)
- First cousins: Theresa McQueen; Jennifique McQueen; Porsche McQueen; Celine McQueen; Cleo McQueen
- Other relatives: Bart McQueen; Kathleen-Angel McQueen; Myra-Pocahontas Savage-McQueen; Goldie McQueen; Breda McQueen; Prince McQueen; Hunter McQueen; Sylver McQueen (adoptive); Cher Winters (adoptive)

Carmel Valentine (also McQueen) is a fictional character from the British Channel 4 soap opera Hollyoaks, played by Gemma Merna. She debuted on-screen during episodes airing on 22 August 2006 and was introduced by series producer Bryan Kirkwood as part of the McQueen family. Carmel has proved popular with fans with her comedic personality and has become notable for her "dumb blonde" appearance. Carmel was killed-off as she saved her cousin, Theresa McQueen (Jorgie Porter) from Sonny Valentine (Aaron Fontaine) during the "End of the Line" storyline. Her most prominent storylines include her marriage and divorce from Sonny's brother Calvin Valentine (Ricky Whittle), her facial disfigurement after a tanning machine explodes in her face, remarrying Calvin which ends in tragedy after he was shot dead by Theresa, her relationship with Jim McGinn (Dan Tetsell), her feud with Theresa and infatuation with Theresa and Calvin's daughter Kathleen-Angel McQueen, beginning a relationship with Sonny and being killed in an explosion following a train crash at her cousin Porsche McQueen's (Twinnie-Lee Moore) wedding reception. On 15 January 2026 it was announced that Merna had reprised her role as part of a dream sequence to tie in with the exit of John Paul McQueen (James Sutton). Carmel returned for a one-off episode on 18 February 2026.

== Creation and casting ==
Carmel was created as part of the McQueen family by Bryan Kirkwood in 2006. Actress Gemma Merna successfully auditioned for the part and Carmel was subsequently created around Merna, of this Kirkwood stated: "Gemma Merna, I remember back to the audition when she turned up looking like a dog's breakfast in what she believed the character would wear. It was instant. From there we created a character around her."

Carmel McQueen; Police Community Support Officer, beautician, masseuse, wannabe nun, pillar of the community. She may come across as a ditzy blonde, but Carmel has strong morals and can be extremely unyielding her fight for justice. Her brother John Paul was gay, and was accepted for her whole life, she was devastated by Niall's attack on her family, which left older sister Tina dead. She has also never really forgiven cousin Theresa for killing the love of her life, Calvin Valentine, on their wedding day. Way to rain on the parade Theresa!

— A reporter from E4 on Carmel.

== Development ==
=== Scarring ===
In June 2012, it was revealed that Carmel will reportedly suffer "horrific injuries" after an accident with a tanning machine. Carmel decides to use the machine to look her best in order to become the face of new gym Atrwell's but the plan backfires when the machine explodes in her face, with a source saying "Carmel's life is on the line because she is desperate to get a tan." Merna later revealed the details of the struggles that lie ahead for Carmel as the storyline begins. Discussing Carmel's consequences, Merna said that Carmel has spent years working in the beauty trade and stated that image is everything to her, so she is devastated. Speaking to TV Times, Merna added: "She feels ugly and thinks other people will think she's ugly too. She's always had this dream of meeting her Prince Charming, but she feels that's never going to happen now and she's going to be stuck on her own." Merna later said that Carmel can't see a future for herself so she goes up onto the hospital roof with a view of jumping off. The scenes aired on 15 June 2012. Merna praised her scarring storyline, describing it as "absolutely fantastic". Speaking on This Morning, Merna said "She is a comedy character to start off with, but I'm quite lucky at Hollyoaks because they do give me the serious storylines to get your teeth into." She said that after her on-screen husband got shot, the writers did not know where to take the character. Merna explained that Carmel "just doesn't know what to do, because she's always wanted a perfect life, a gorgeous husband, lovely children – and the thing that hits her now is [the fear that] no-one will fancy her anymore, no-one will want to be with her. So it took her to the point that we saw last week where she went to the top of the roof to possibly jump off and commit suicide." Merna confessed that she did cry real tears when filming her first hospital scenes following the accident and said that it was fantastic for the scene.

=== Departure and death ===
On 24 August 2014, Merna announced that she would be leaving the role. Carmel was killed off in the train explosion in November after being a hero, saving cousin Theresa McQueen (Jorgie Porter) from the hands of Sonny Valentine (Aaron Fontaine). "Yours" by Ella Henderson was played in the background as Carmel calmly died with her family around her. The episode in which Carmel died was broadcast on Channel 4 on 12 November 2014, with cast members and television critics praising Merna's performance in her final scenes.

== Storylines ==
Carmel is the fifth child of Myra McQueen (Nicole Barber-Lane), and eldest child of Ricky Bowen (Simon Cassidy). Carmel grew up alongside her older half-sisters, Jacqui (Claire Cooper), Mercedes (Jennifer Metcalfe) and Tina (Leah Hackett) and younger siblings, John Paul (James Sutton) and Michaela (Hollie-Jay Bowes). Carmel follows the Catholic religion. Darren Osborne (Ashley Taylor Dawson) notices Carmel's singing talents and gets her to perform for customers in the SU bar. She does so but is unaware that the audience expect an explicit performance. Mercedes discovers this and warns Carmel, who is determined to continue. After the deaths of Mel (Cassie Powney) and Sophie Burton (Connie Powney), Carmel begins working at Evissa. Carmel finds and steals money from Jacqui for breast implants, unaware the money is her criminal acquaintance's. Carmel is attracted to Jake Dean (Kevin Sacre) in Evissa and the pair go out for a meal, however the date is cut short when Jake's ex-wife Becca (Ali Bastian) arrives with fiancé Justin Burton (Chris Fountain) for a meal. During a confrontation, Carmel feels ignored and decides to leave.

Jacqui is forced into marrying Albanian immigrant, Aleksander Malota (Jon Lolis), who Carmel falls in love with, however, she fails to resist him. After this, he tells her the real reason he is married to Jacqui. They start an affair and Carmel is pressurized into concealing Jacqui's deception. The affair is revealed and Jacqui and Myra are disgusted and furious at Carmel. Jacqui also confesses her love for Tony Hutchinson (Nick Pickard), who she has been having an affair with, and tells Alek that he has to go back to Albania, which upsets Carmel. Carmel arrives home and finds Alek packing his bags. After she goes out for some food, Alek leaves, leaving Carmel heartbroken. Carmel decides to leave to find him, however John Paul stops her. Carmel takes pity on her brother-in-law Russ Owen (Stuart Manning), who has divorced Carmel's half-sister, Mercedes. An attraction ignites but Carmel knows she cannot act on them. While attending a party at the student Halls, Carmel and Russ have a heart-to-heart in John Paul's bedroom and the pair affirm their love for one another. During their secret heart-to-heart, they are clueless in knowing that they are being poisoned by carbon monoxide, which is spreading throughout the halls, and they collapse. Justin later saves the students but has no idea that Carmel and Russ are locked in John Paul's room. When Mercedes realises that Carmel is at the party, she and the other McQueens attempt to find her. They break the door and discover Carmel embraced on the bed with Russ. Mercedes is jealous given Carmel's history with her sisters' husbands. Russ and Carmel are saved but are both placed in a coma. In hospital, Myra shouts at Mercedes when she comments Carmel and Russ' state on the bed, who recover a few days later.

Carmel and Frankie Osborne (Helen Pearson) read their horoscopes, which say Carmel would fall in love with someone related to the number '3'. Outside, she drops her ring down a drain. Calvin Valentine (Ricky Whittle) comes and assists her. As Calvin walks away, Carmel tells Frankie she is attracted to him, who realises that Calvin has a number 3 on his T-shirt. At Louise Summers (Roxanne McKee) and Warren Fox's (Jamie Lomas) engagement party, Carmel is guilt-ridden for her illicit feelings for Calvin, who is Louise's ex-fiancé. At the end of the night, Calvin and Carmel almost kiss but he is distracted by a fire in Evissa. After he saves Louise, Calvin realises he is neglecting Carmel as he is caring unnecessarily for Louise. The pair share a passionate kiss and begin a serious relationship. Carmel tells Calvin she wants to join the police force. She passes a fitness test to join the police. Calvin accidentally proposes to a delighted Carmel. At the wedding, Calvin is late for his wedding due to being is caught up in a drugs raid at The Loft. Finally, he arrives and the pair are wed.

Carmel and Calvin's bliss does not last very long. After they return from their honeymoon, Calvin begins to feel increasingly guilty over Nige's (Sam Townend) "death", which he thinks he caused. After a row over Lauren (Dominique Jackson), Calvin leaves for Spain to stay with Danny Valentine (David Judge). Lauren finds a note from Carmel saying she has gone away on a spa break, however Lauren is unaware that Carmel has been kidnapped by Niall Rafferty (Barry Sloane), her secret brother. Niall holds all of the McQueens in the church where Myra left him as a baby. Carmel, and her sisters, are shocked to discover that Niall is their half-brother. Niall tells the McQueens he has explosives around the church and will detonate them, Carmel cries as she thinks she will never see Calvin again. Niall tells Myra he will ask her six questions and each one that she gets correct, she can choose one child to live and each one that she gets wrong, she can choose one child to die. Myra gets two questions right. John Paul and Mercedes sacrifice their lives and Myra has to choose another two to die. When he threatens to kill Michaela first, Myra reluctantly chooses Jacqui and Carmel to die. Carmel is devastated by Myra's choice, Myra tells them that it is because Tina has baby Max (Brayden Haynes-Mawdsley) and Michaela is the youngest. Carmel begins to say a prayer just as Darren and Jack Osborne (Jimmy McKenna) enter the church to rescue the McQueens. Niall detonates the explosives and the church explodes. With only a broken arm and a few cuts and bruises, Carmel is safe from the church, however Tina and Niall die. A few days later, the police phone and reveal Niall is still alive.

Carmel promises Lauren that she would buy her and Barry "Newt" Newton (Nico Mirallegro) condoms but Calvin finds them and assumes Carmel is having an affair with Mark Gascoyne (Craig Russell). She tries to tell him they are for Lauren but Calvin kicks her out. Carmel moves back with the McQueens. After a couple of days, Carmel asks Calvin for a divorce since she cannot trust him anymore. At Christmas, Carmel begins auditioning people for her nativity play. Her cousin, Theresa (Jorgie Porter), auditions but is called off the stage by people making fun of her for having sex with Tony, claiming she cannot play a virgin when she clearly is not. Carmel then decides to play the Virgin Mary herself, however, the play is a disaster when the star the Three Wise Men follow catches fire. Calvin tells Carmel that Warren killed her best friend Louise on their wedding day. Carmel does not want to believe that she is dead at first but then in Evissa, she sees a post-it note written by Louise, she then sees Warren with Sasha (Nathalie Emmanuel) and Spencer Gray (Darren John Langford), she leaves Evissa and approaches him crying and accuses him of murdering her best friend, which Warren denies. After Warren is killed by Clare Devine (Gemma Bissix) in a fire at The Loft, Calvin takes in his autistic foster brother Spencer. Carmel comforts him and tells him about Tina's death and how it will get better with time.

Russ comes to see his son, Max, after Jacqui tries to stop him seeing him. Russ sees his chance and takes Max and his passport. Carmel watches as Russ leaves with Max but does not stop him before he leaves Hollyoaks. Calvin later tells Carmel that he had seen Clare in The Loft and left her to kill Warren before he died. Carmel then decides to get back together with Calvin when he has told Spencer and Sasha the truth. Carmel tells Jacqui she let Russ take Max, however, as she tells Jacqui, Calvin does not tell the police and Carmel tells him their relationship is over for good. Jacqui vows never to forgive her sister. Carmel feels bad as if she has let her sister down. Myra finds out and tells Carmel she should not have done it. Jacqui later forgives Carmel. Spencer gives Carmel the position of manager at Evissa. Carmel also takes on other jobs including a cheer leading coach at Hollyoaks High School and returning to her role as a PCSO. Carmel later asks Calvin if he minds if she changed her name back to her maiden name and their divorce papers come through. Calvin and Carmel become close again, despite the fact Calvin is secretly sleeping with Mercedes. Carmel later tells Calvin she wants to get back together. Calvin is happy and ends things with Mercedes to be with Carmel. Not knowing Mercedes has been having affair with Calvin, Carmel confides in her, telling her how Calvin left Warren to die. Mercedes, still upset about Calvin dumping her, tells Sasha. Calvin blames Carmel for this and they split up again. However, Carmel realises how much she loves Calvin and they agree to get married again. Carmel is upset when Mercedes refuses to come to the wedding, unaware of her reasoning.

Sasha tries to ruin the day by announcing to the whole wedding party that Calvin left Warren to die. Carmel calls her a bitch and asks her to leave, saying no one will ruin her day. Carmel goes looking for Calvin when he goes missing in the evening and finds him in Evissa with her cousin, Theresa, who reveals she is pregnant. Little does Carmel know that Calvin is the father. The wedding is eventually ruined when Theresa shoots Calvin during the first dance. Shortly afterwards, he is confirmed dead.

Carmel's heartbreak continues when Cheryl Brady (Bronagh Waugh) tells her Calvin was having an affair with Mercedes. Carmel then tells Mercedes' husband Malachy Fisher (Glen Wallace) about the affair, but was horrified to hear that he already knew. She then confronts Mercedes and slaps her. Carmel tells Mercedes that she is not her sister. Carmel thinks she is pregnant, but it turns out to be a false alarm. Carmel is deeply devastated and when she learns that Theresa is having an abortion she goes to the abortion clinic and stops her. A month later Anita Roy (Saira Choudhry) frantically informs her that she has found a gun in the salon. However Jacqui replaces the gun with a hairdryer and plants the gun inside Gaz Bennett's (Joel Goonan) bag. When the police search the salon, they find a hairdryer inside a carrier bag where the gun was originally placed. Carmel gets furious and very upset at Anita and accuses her of lying. Later the police informs Carmel that Gaz is formally charged with Calvin's murder after they found him taking Anita hostage in the woods with a gun in his hand; the same gun that was used to shoot and kill Calvin. Subsequently, the police believe that Gaz is Calvin's murderer – after all the evidence led to him. Theresa unexpectedly comes home to hear this news and tells her that Gaz did not murder Calvin, in which Carmel wonders why Theresa would defend him. Before Calvin's funeral, Kyle Ryder (Neil Toon) is charged with Calvin's murder when his fingerprints are found on the gun which was found in Gaz's bag. That same gun had been used some time before Calvin's murder in a robbery which Kyle committed. Kyle tells the police it was Theresa who really killed Calvin, but due to his fingerprints being on the gun, the police think he's lying. The police arrive at Calvin's wake and tell Carmel about the claims Kyle has been making, and it slowly dawns on Carmel that Theresa killed Calvin.

Carmel confronts Theresa that night and Theresa admits she killed Calvin. Carmel keeps pushing her until she breaks and admits that she and Calvin slept together, and that Calvin is the baby's father. She also, inadvertently, lets Myra know that Mercedes was having an affair with Calvin. Carmel is heartbroken when she finds out Jacqui and Mercedes knew who the real murderer was the whole time, however she agrees to keep quiet until the baby is born. Carmel is even more upset when she learns that the Valentines are leaving the village. At the new Chez Chez nightclub launch party, she realises and is persuaded by Jacqui that she cannot tell them that Theresa is pregnant with Calvin's baby. Carmel then realises she has to let the family make a fresh start away from Hollyoaks, so she cheers a tearful farewell to them.

She becomes good friends with Brendan Brady (Emmett J. Scanlan) and bond at a night in the SU Bar. Brendan offers to take Carmel on a business trip to Barcelona, but in fact he was only taking her in order to smuggle drugs into the country using her bags. After some convincing from Ste Hay (Kieron Richardson), Carmel accepts and Brendan successfully imports the drugs. Upon her return, she kisses Brendan but soon regrets doing this. She is then roped into planning Cindy Cunningham's (Stephanie Waring) wedding by her sister Jacqui, though spoils it, exposing the truth about who really saved Cindy's fiancé Alistair that night. Brendan then offers to take her on another trip, and Carmel immediately agrees to go. However, their relationship is halted when Brendan hides a stack of twenty pound notes in Carmel's bag, which then catches fire after an incident at Evissa. Brendan becomes angry and shouts abuse at Carmel, leaving her distraught.

Theresa gives birth to a baby girl. Carmel tells her she is sticking by her word, and will go to the police about Calvin's murder. However, Jacqui and Myra convince her that they will all be arrested if she goes to the police and the baby will be put in care. Carmel then agrees to keep quiet, then announces that she wants to raise the baby as her own child, but Mercedes tells Carmel that either the baby, named Kathleen Khloe Angel, stays with Theresa and Theresa's secret is kept hidden or Carmel goes to jail for child abduction. After discovering Theresa and Carmel's situation, Kathleen locked Myra in her room while Carmel was out so that she could christen Kathleen-Angel. She hires a priest and she and Theresa christen the baby. After Kyle kidnaps Theresa and Kathleen-Angel, Carmel gives up her claim to Kathleen-Angel. Carmel dates Billy Alexander (Richard Graham) but is shocked when she realizes that he is the father of Mercedes, Jacqui and Theresa and that he was only using her to get to them.

After an accident with Theresa and Kathleen-Angel, Carmel appears to see Calvin who tells her to keep her faith. Carmel turns to God and decides to begin training as a nun, much to the shock of her family, however her temptation is challenged when a good looking priest named Father Francis (Richard Winsor) arrives in the village. Carmel finds him hard to resist and is rejected by him when she tried to kiss him. She is also embarrassed when she realizes that he is her client at the spa. Later, Father Francis becomes attracted to her and kisses her twice. She kisses him back but she feels guilty that she had kissed a priest. Carmel helps Francis raise money for an African orphanage by a charity dance class and a nude calendar which, Francis agrees to become a part of. Carmel and Francis talk about leaving their chosen paths in order to be together but Carmel comes to the conclusion that Francis was sent to test her faith and decides not to go with him. Following Carmel's decision Francis leaves for Uganda. Carmel tries to catch up with him at the airport but is disappointed to find the flight for Uganda had gone. When Francis returned he kissed Carmel's boss, Cindy, Carmel was heartbroken and never wanted to see Francis again. As Cindy was going to make a donation to the orphanage Francis revealed to Carmel that he seduces women and cons them into giving him their money. Carmel tells Cindy of this and Cindy says she will get him back. Carmel forgives Francis and they plan to start a new life with each other in Uganda. Francis declines Cindy's half a million thousand pound offer and goes to Carmel, just as the set off the police arrive whom Cindy had called and Francis gets taken away in handcuffs leaving Carmel heartbroken once again.

Carmel enters a beauty competition for an advertisement job. After Michaela makes fun of her pale complexion, Carmel decides to use Michaela's tanning lamp. However the lamp is faulty and it explodes in her face. Carmel is told she will have a permanent scar on her face. Carmel goes up to the hospital roof, intending to jump, as she believes she was only unique because of her appearance and has nothing to live for. Lynsey Nolan (Karen Hassan) persuades Carmel not to jump. Carmel finds it hard to leave the hospital and Ally Gorman (Daniel O'Connor) introduces her to some of his army friends who have lost limbs. Still embarrassed over her scar, Carmel decides to stay with Nana McQueen (Diane Langton) for a few weeks. Carmel is romanced by Barney Harper-McBride (Tom Scurr). Carmel meets lawyer Jim McGinn (Dan Tetsell) and she is disgusted when he tries to flirt with her. Mercedes tells Carmel that Nana was paying Barney to romance her and Carmel is humiliated. She runs straight into the path of Jim's car and Jim helps Carmel home. After accidentally punching Jim, Carmel takes him to dinner, where he argues with Doctor Browning (Joseph Thompson). Carmel rebuffs Jim's advances. As Carmel cleans up the pond in place of Jacqui, she is upset to see a magazine article on her tanning accident. Jim asks Carmel out on a date and she accepts. When Carmel believes Jim has arranged a lunch at The Dog in the Pond public house and sees him eating a hotdog, she storms off, as she believed the date would be more fancy. She then sees a limousine and realises that it is part of Jim's plan. Jim decides to go off in the limousine himself, leaving Carmel feeling guilty.

Carmel sees Jim with a bunch of flowers and presumes he is seeing another woman. He later explains the flowers were for his mother and he makes her chicken soup when she is ill. Carmel's feelings for Jim grow stronger. Jim prepares to leave Hollyoaks, but Carmel stops him. Carmel tells Jim that she loves him and they begin dating. Jim buys one half of the club and goes into business with Browning, they hire their respective partners Carmel and Mercedes to run Chez Chez. The initial plan is for Jim to be a silent partner at the club, but Carmel is unhappy with this, and she has other ideas, and tries to sway Jim into letting her have more of what she wants on the club. Mercedes resents Carmel's behaviour, and a power struggle begins to develop between them. Becoming competitive, they decide to split the club in half for the opening night and see who can make the most money. On the opening night, Carmel and Mercedes fight. However, they fail to realise that Ste has asked Robbie Roscoe (Charlie Wernham) to plant some drugs in the office to frame them. The police arrive and find the pills, arresting both Carmel and Mercedes. They are later released.

Jim overhears Carmel telling Theresa how Calvin was the love of her life, he becomes upset, thinking that he does not mean that much to Carmel. Carmel tells him that he did not hear her say how much he means to her. As their relationship progresses, Carmel worries that if she has sex with Jim, he will be put off by her scar. Myra tells Carmel that Jim loves her for who she is and they have sex for the first time. Jim gives Carmel money for cosmetic surgery to improve her scar and Carmel briefly leaves the village. Carmel starts up a beauty salon in a small section of Atwells, called McPreens. Jim feels insecure when he sees her with Ziggy Roscoe (Fabrizio Santino) and tells her that he feels he is not good enough for her. Carmel tells him that he is the only man she wants. For Jim's birthday, Carmel organises a small picnic and gives him a replica war helmet. Carmel proposes to Jim and he accepts. During an engagement lunch, Mercedes tells Carmel that Jim had sex with Myra. Devastated, Carmel breaks up with Jim. Myra attempts to comfort Carmel, but Carmel remains angry with her. Myra realises that she needs to leave Chester and says goodbye to her family. They later learn that Doctor Browning has shot her and her body might never be found.

Carmel struggles with Myra's death. She is later injured when Nana and Theresa's scam to fake a robbery at home goes wrong. Carmel calls Jim, who comforts her and she learns that Nana faked the robbery because they wanted money to give Myra the send-off she deserves. Carmel is touched when Jim offers to pay for Myra's memorial. When Jim proposes, Carmel accepts. Jim is arrested on suspicion of arson when the club is set alight. He is later released and tells Carmel that he has lost the club and Trevor Royle (Greg Wood) framed him for the fire. Jim also reveals that Trevor's boss wants him to help his daughter, Clare, get out of prison. Carmel is furious that Jim is getting involved with Clare after what she did to her family. Jim tells her that if he cannot secure Clare's release, he cannot guarantee Carmel's safety.

Clare is soon released after her trial, and under the pretense of making amends with the McQueens for what she did to Mercedes, she offers to host Mercedes' 30th birthday party in The Loft. Carmel and the others agree, unaware that Clare plans to set off a bomb inside later. Later, Carmel becomes suspicious when Jim begins behaving oddly. She and Theresa search Carmel's room, to find some test results, which show that Jim has chlamydia. Carmel presumes he has been having sex with other women, and confronts Jim in the courthouse. When Jim refuses to explain in front of the others, Carmel goes home and packs up Jim's things. When he returns, she throws him out. After he leaves, Theresa comments that she has had chlamydia during the time of her and Calvin's affair. Carmel is horrified to realise that she must have caught it from Calvin and passed it onto Jim, meaning he is innocent. Carmel goes to Dee Valley Hospital to see a GP, who tells her that because she has had the disease for several years, she could possibly be infertile. An enraged Carmel confronts Theresa in the street, blaming her for what has happened, only for Jim to arrive and stop the argument. Carmel is devastated, but Jim comforts her, and tells her that even if she can't have children, they can adopt. Carmel and Jim go to see the adoption agency, but Carmel is upset when she is told it could take them several years to adopt, and begins to grow resentful that Theresa has what she cannot have - a child. She is anxious when she discovers that the dollhouse Theresa got for Kathleen-Angel's Christmas present is stolen. She goes to see Chloe (Susan Loughnane), who agrees to give her baby to Carmel, only for Carmel to realise that Jim has been listening to their conversation. She says she is sorry for going to see Jim behind his back, but tells him how badly she wants a child, and Jim agrees to the idea.

When the police come to see her on the day of Chloe's visit and show her footage of Theresa stealing Kathleen-Angel's doll house, it is clear that they have mistaken her identity for her cousin. Carmel is furious with Theresa, and prepares to throw the doll house at her - just as Chloe walks in. Chloe realises she cannot sell her baby to Carmel, but convinces Carmel to bring forward the payment and she will give her the baby. Carmel steals some of Jim's money to give to Chloe. She gets revenge by telling Dodger that Theresa has been sending the emails from Texas. Carmel is grateful when she sees an envelope from Chloe, containing the money she gave her for the baby. After a disgusted Dodger dumps her, Theresa responds by pretending to have sex with a drunk Jim, and as Carmel walks in on them, she presumes the obvious, but Nana forces Theresa to admit the truth. Furious at Theresa's behaviour and neglect of Kathleen-Angel, Carmel phones Calvin's brother Sonny Valentine (now played by Aaron Fontaine), and tells him they have to get Kathleen-Angel away from Theresa. Carmel's efforts seem to be paying off as Sonny returns to the village, and introduces him to his niece, Kathleen-Angel. Carmel again reminds him of her plea she made over the phone, and when Sonny refuses, Carmel blurts out that Theresa killed Calvin. However, Carmel soon regrets this and is horrified to discover that Sonny has joined the police force since leaving the village. Sonny confronts Theresa on the street, causing her to panic that she is about to be arrested, so Mercedes and Nana hatch a plot for Theresa to leave the country, and she reluctantly agrees to leave Kathleen-Angel with Carmel for the time being. Theresa and Mercedes head to the airport, and Carmel goes with Jim to buy Kathleen-Angel a present, only to discover she is missing on her return. She instantly thinks that Theresa has taken her on the run, and quickly informs the police of Theresa's plan. Theresa is found at the airport, and tries to evade the police, but is soon discovered trying to run away. Carmel soon arrives at the airport, believing Theresa has taken Kathleen-Angel with her. However, Kathleen-Angel was in fact taken by Sonny, who then arrests Theresa for the murder of his brother, Calvin.

An angry Mercedes persuades Carmel to come to the police station to retract her statement, but just as they arrive, they find out that Theresa, who has been under interrogation, has admitted to murdering Calvin, and that she is going to prison. A devastated Carmel begs Sonny to let her see Theresa, and he agrees. Carmel apologises to her for what she has done, but Theresa bears no ill-will towards her, telling her that she knew she had it coming in the end, and also asks her to look after Kathleen-Angel. She tells her that she is protecting her from Sonny, and will do anything to release her from prison.

After Jim is accidentally run over and left in a coma by Freddie Roscoe (Charlie Clapham), Carmel stands by him, despite Mercedes voicing her suspicions that Sonny has feelings for her. When Jim wakes up, a jealous Sonny shows Carmel CCTV footage of Jim helping Myra out of the water after Browning shot her. A hurt Carmel breaks off their relationship, telling Jim that she cannot marry someone who lies to her, but she is stung to learn that John Paul knew the truth. A furious Mercedes later throws Jim out of the McQueen home, but he begs Carmel to reconsider, claiming that he has given up everything if it means that he can be with her - and asks her and Kathleen-Angel to leave the village with him. However, Sonny refuses to let them take his niece. A sympathetic John Paul reminds Carmel that Jim is still the man she fell in love with him, and that if she wants to be with him, she should.

Carmel decides to go with Jim, and sneaks out, whilst John Paul manages to dupe Sonny into letting him take Kathleen-Angel. Carmel waits for Jim in the square, but as he makes his way through a crowd of late-night pub-goers, he is stabbed by a disguised Fraser, in revenge for his betrayal. Carmel is devastated to notice he is bleeding, putting paid to their happy ending, as Jim dies in her arms. She is distraught when it is found Jim is under suspicion for a long list of criminal involvement, and after Trevor is found not guilty, Grace Black (Tamara Wall) taunts Jim's demise, leading to Carmel slapping her. She is charged with assault, but Sonny makes sure she is released. Sonny and Carmel kiss at Jim's funeral and they begin to take Kathleen-Angel into their own care. Carmel becomes more protective towards Kathleen-Angel and begins to grow a mother and daughter bond towards her.

In August 2014, Theresa sends a visiting notice to Kathleen-Angel and Carmel is worried. Sonny comforts Carmel and he later throws the notice away. Carmel thinks that Theresa has cancelled it on purpose, unaware of Sonny's plans. Myra then returns to the village and sees Carmel. Myra explains to Carmel that she has to let Kathleen-Angel go as she belongs to Theresa. Carmel is angry and she refuses to let Theresa take her away. She later sees Theresa and they try to help Kathleen-Angel to choose whom to be with. Sonny later takes Carmel and Kathleen-Angel away, and Carmel is upset as she has torn her family apart.

Carmel later finds out that Mercedes, Myra and Phoebe may have killed Sonny. They all go to the lake to pay their respects but are stunned as the car is removed from the lake. Carmel finds evidence of Sonny threatening the McQueen's before his disappearance which also holds something to release Theresa from prison. She throws away the evidence, and Myra is shocked by what she has done. Carmel finds the phone and takes it to the police. Theresa is later released, and she goes into labour. Carmel takes Kathleen-Angel to see Myra Pocahontas but she is upset to let her go. Theresa and Carmel begin fighting over Kathleen-Angel and Myra-Pocahontas, and Theresa suspects that she has spiked her drink. It is later revealed that Phoebe is causing Theresa's problems as she is with Sonny. Carmel then visits Nana in hospital as Sonny tried to murder Nana. Myra thinks that Carmel is causing Theresa problems, and asks her to leave. Carmel refuses to do so, and Phoebe puts a social services leaflet in her bag. Theresa is outraged that Carmel did this and attacks her, leading to a catfight. Myra is angry with Carmel and tells her to leave the family. Phoebe makes up that Theresa had put the leaflet in her bag, and she has to leave the village with Kathleen-Angel. Carmel accepts and flees the village. She is pulled over by Sonny and is stunned to see him. Sonny requests to see Kathleen-Angel and Carmel says no. Sonny finds out that Carmel has used a doll instead of taking Kathleen-Angel. It turns out that when Phoebe told Carmel her story, Carmel decided to trick Sonny by leaving Kathleen-Angel at home. Sonny is outraged and throws Carmel into his car and drives off. Carmel later escapes the car when Sonny stops and takes her out and finds out that she had removed her engagement ring and he is enraged by this. Carmel pushes Sonny over and flees. Myra and Mercedes find out that Sonny is back, and try to find Carmel. Carmel later trips over, and drops her heeled shoe. She is unaware that Sonny is right behind her, and he lifts the heeled shoe. She is later unseen by the tree she was standing near. Only a massive log is in her place.

Carmel returns to the village a few weeks later, under a shroud of mystery as she enters the police station and asks for help. She reconciles with her family, but is later revealed to be working for Sonny and is trying to abduct Kathleen-Angel and move away with her and Sonny. On the day of her cousin Porsche McQueen's (Twinnie-Lee Moore) wedding to Lockie Campbell (Nick Rhys), Carmel plans to execute her plan and packs her and Kathleen-Angel's passports. Carmel then sneaks off during the reception with the child and tries to meet up with Sonny, but later changes her mind and returns to the ceremony. Sonny, enraged, verbally belittles Carmel, causing her to storm off to the wedding reception, which is set to take place on a party train.

During the reception, Theresa discovers Kathleen-Angel's passport in Carmel's bag and the guests are shocked. Myra and Mercedes tell Carmel she is no longer part of the family, whilst John Paul, Theresa and Dodger tell her to stay away from Kathleen-Angel. Unbeknownst to the guests, Sonny sneaks onto the train using Carmel's invite and attacks Phoebe with a metal bar, locking her in the toilet, before attempting to throw Theresa off. However, Sienna Blake's (Anna Passey) car is stuck on the train tracks and the train smashes into it, causing it to derail. Carmel is the first to wake up and scrambles from the wreckage, leading her family out in the process. She then realizes that Sonny is holding Theresa hostage in the debris and re-enters the wreckage of the train, attempting to save Theresa. A propane gas canister is opened in the scuffle, and Carmel manages to free Theresa long enough for her to escape from the upturned train, before flames react with the gas and the wreckage explodes. Horrified, Theresa re-enters the wreckage again after the explosion to try and save Carmel, but finds her in critical condition and trapped under debris. Theresa and Carmel reflect on their relationship and their past in Hollyoaks village, before Myra, Phoebe and Mercedes enter looking for the pair. The family gather around a trapped Carmel and say their goodbyes and make amends over their previous argument. Carmel forgives them, and ask Myra to tell her a story. Myra tells her a fairytale story, and Carmel then dies with Myra, Phoebe and Mercedes by her side. John Paul later enters the carriage, but finds Carmel, dead with her family by her side, leaving him devastated.

Two months later, John Paul mentioned to his new husband Ste that he wished that if Carmel was alive, she will be one of his bridemaids at their wedding. In March 2017, John Paul went to visit her grave, along with the graves of her sister Tina and cousin Celine, to say goodbye for the last time before leaving the village for Singapore. In July 2024, Mercedes names her daughter Maria-Carmella McQueen partly after Carmel.

== Reception ==
Proving popular with fans, Gemma Merna won both "Funniest Character" and "Favourite Female Character" at the 2007 Hollyoaks Awards. She won the award of "Best Comedy Performance" at the 2007 British Soap Awards. In 2007 she was nominated for "Sexiest Female". In 2008 she was nominated for "Best Actress", however, she lost to co-star, Emma Rigby. At the 2007 Inside Soap Awards, Merna was nominated for "Best Newcomer". In 2008, Merna and Ricky Whittle were nominated for the award of "Best Couple" for their portrayals of Carmel and Calvin Valentine. At the 2009 Inside Soap Awards, the McQueens won "Best Family". In 2012, Merna was nominated for "Funniest Female" at the Inside Soap Awards. Virgin Media compiled a list of their favourite soap couples, Carmel and Calvin were featured and they stated: "Couples don’t come much cuter than these two – they even have matching police uniforms! The Valentines may be a little lacking in the brain cell department, but they more than make up for it by being the biggest-hearted couple in soap."
