= Calvin Valentine =

Fictional character from Hollyoaks

- Hollyoaks character
- Portrayed by: Ricky Whittle
- Duration: 2006–2011
- First appearance: 17 July 2006
- Last appearance: 16 February 2011
- Introduced by: Bryan Kirkwood
In-universe information
- Occupation: Police Constable; Nightclub manager
- Family: McQueen
- Father: Leo Valentine
- Mother: Diane Valentine
- Brothers: Sonny Valentine
- Sisters: Sasha Valentine
- Half-brothers: Danny Valentine
- Half-sisters: Lauren Valentine
- Wife: Carmel McQueen (2008–2009, 2010)
- Daughters: Kathleen-Angel McQueen
- Aunts: Adeola

Calvin Valentine is a fictional character from the British Channel 4 soap opera Hollyoaks, played by Ricky Whittle. He arrived in July 2006 as a police officer with his mother Diane Valentine, his brother Sonny Valentine and his sister Sasha Valentine and made his final appearance on 21 May 2010 after he was murdered by Theresa McQueen (Jorgie Porter). Whittle was credited for a flashback episode on 1 December 2010. Calvin appeared again as a ghost to tell his wife and Theresa's Cousin Carmel McQueen (Gemma Merna) that his and Theresa's daughter, Kathleen-Angel McQueen, was fine with Theresa in February 2011.

== Casting ==
In May 2006, it was announced former Dream Team actor Ricky Whittle would arrive in Hollyoaks as "mysterious" Calvin Valentine. Along with Whittle's casting, it was announced his former Dream Team co-star Jamie Lomas would take on the part of "bad boy" Warren Fox. Speaking of Lomas and Whittle's casting, a Hollyoaks spokesperson stated: "We're delighted to welcome Ricky and Jamie to the Hollyoaks cast. Their characters are set to bring lots of drama to the show!"

In 2009, it was announced that Whittle had decided to leave the series after he quit to pursue other projects. It was then announced that the character would be killed off. Speaking of how he reached the decision to leave, Whittle stated: "To be honest I was always looking to leave next year. It'll be four years next year when I eventually leave. Everyone has ambition. I could stay on this show for the rest of my life because I love it up here - it's a wicked little family and we're all really close. However, I don't want to spend all that time here for a big movie director or producer to come across to England when I'm in my 30s and say, 'If you'd come over when you were in your 20s, you'd've made it really big'. I'd rather go over to the States, go do the movie thing, the drama thing, or even fail - I'd rather go over and fail and have them say, 'You're not good enough, your accent's not right or your look's not right' - at least then I'd know and I'd have it out of my head. I always believe you regret the things you don't do. I don't want what-ifs hanging over me."

== Development ==
=== Personality and identity ===
Calvin first appeared as an honest, kind-hearted policeman. However, in 2008, the character of Calvin began to change, when his younger sister Sasha Valentine (Nathalie Emmanuel) began buying drugs from Nige Foster (Sam Townend), who Calvin ultimately ended up believing he had killed. Whittle, speaking to Digital Spy, said, "He was at his lowest ebb. Everyone forgets that he's only 22 and he's had to look after his family. He's still just a kid himself and everything piles up on him. He just doesn't know what to do any more. Sasha was on the drugs and then she came off them. Calvin was making an extra effort with her and there was no reason for her to go back to them. He didn't understand why she went back to the drugs after all his efforts. When he caught her 'self-harming' — or what Calvin thought was self-harming — he didn't want her to go through the ordeal, so he went to get her drugs."

Calvin then began dodgy dealings for Warren, including drugs. Whittle, speaking to Digital Spy, said, "Calvin and Warren have always been these stags who have locked horns – good versus evil, battling for the two years we've been on the show together. Warren's going to start corrupting Calvin a little bit. Calvin's been on the moral side for two years and it's not really done anything for him. He's lost the girl, the baby, friends and family. Whereas Warren's been wheeling and dealing and he's got the girl, the club, the money, the car… Let's just say Warren leads Calvin astray a little and they're going to become allies."

=== Relationships ===
The apparent love of Calvin's life was originally Louise Summers (Roxanne McKee). However, their engagement ended when he discovered her affair with his enemy Warren Fox. The second main love for Calvin was Carmel McQueen (Gemma Merna). The characters quickly fell in love, became engaged and eventually married. In May 2008, series producer Bryan Kirkwood, speaking to Digital Spy about the couple's upcoming wedding, said: "They're a fantastic couple to come up with stories for. They're engaged at the moment and it's nice to see the lighter side of Calvin. We'll have fun watching Carmel planning the wedding of the millennium and it'll continue to serve the fun war between the Valentines and McQueens."

Whittle also discussed Calvin and Carmel's relationship and second wedding. He explained: "Calvin's completely besotted with Carmel. She's the one he's always wanted - she's always been his true love since they first started seeing each other and everyone's always wanted them to get back together, which has been nice. I think it's a very good example of fan power. The producers weren't going to put these two together ever again because everyone wanted them together. It was a Ross and Rachel situation — they're meant to be [together], but something would always happen for it not to quite work out. I think Calvin and Carmel fans will be happy that they're back together in the episode — it'll just pull a few heartstrings when Calvin's shot at the end."

=== Departure and death ===
Of the flash forward episode in which Calvin is killed, Whittle said: "I was so honoured that they gave me a flash forward — that’s never been done before. So people knew months ago that Calvin was going to die. You want to do a story justice and when it’s your exit, you want it to be memorable." Whittle's final scenes involved his death scene of which he stated: "Calvin was actually already dead, so it was more about the aftermath. I was just lying there while people were crying around me."

It was announced on 28 January 2011 that Calvin would appear to Carmel as a ghost in February 2011. His reappearance is to coincide with the revenge of Kyle Ryder (Neil Toon) on Theresa McQueen (Jorgie Porter), Calvin's murderer. Teasing the surprise storyline, a Hollyoaks statement said: "Calvin's spirit reignites Carmel's love for the man she lost and leads her to make some tough decisions about her future." However, Ricky Whittle will not return to the soap as the forthcoming scenes were filmed while he was still contracted with the show in 2010. Calvin returned for episodes from 14 February 2011, and made his last appearance on 16 February 2011.

== Storylines ==
=== Backstory ===
Living with his mother Diane (Pauline Black) and younger siblings, Sonny (Devon Anderson) and Sasha (Nathalie Emmanuel), Calvin assumed the "man of the house" role after his father, Leo Valentine (Brian Bovell), walked out on them when Sasha and Sonny were young. During this time, Calvin developed an over-protective personality, which still shows presently. Unbeknownst to Calvin and his other siblings, Leo had been having an affair with Valerie Holden (Samantha Giles) for years and had produced two more children, Danny (David Judge) and Lauren (Dominique Jackson), whom he went to stay with in the thirteen years before arriving in Hollyoaks.

=== 2006–2011 ===
Calvin arrives with his mother, Diane, and two younger siblings, Sonny and Sasha. Calvin begins his first day as a police officer and tragically discovers that Diane has been killed in a hit-and-run accident. Calvin then has to break the news to Sonny and Sasha. Despite grieving, Calvin does his best to look after his siblings, however their father, Leo, arrives to take control of the family. Calvin does not want Leo back in their lives because of the heartache he caused Diane. Sam Owen (Louis Tamone) takes everyone, including Calvin, hostage at The Dog in the Pond public house and threatens to blow it up. Calvin attempts to stop him by smashing a glass over his head, however this causes Sam to drop the lighter and The Dog explodes. Calvin saves Jake Dean (Kevin Sacre), despite Jake being responsible for Diane's death.

In 2007, Calvin and Louise Summers (Roxanne McKee) begin a relationship. After a heated dispute and eventual separation, Louise has sex with Warren Fox (Jamie Lomas). Louise and Calvin resume their romance, however, upon their reconciliation, she announces her pregnancy. Perceptive in knowing the baby could be Warren's, Clare Cunningham (Gemma Bissix) convinces Louise to have an abortion and tell Calvin she suffered a miscarriage. After Calvin uncovers Louise's betrayal, he dumps her. Calvin becomes a suspect with Warren, Louise, Sam "O.B." O'Brien (Darren Jeffries) and Max Cunningham (Matt Littler) for the attempted murder of Clare after his mobile phone is found at the scene of the crime. He is questioned but later released. In September 2007, Calvin unearths that he has two half-siblings, Danny and Lauren, who are the children of Leo and Valerie, the woman whom he had an affair with for years. Calvin and Carmel McQueen (Gemma Merna) become romantically linked and announce their engagement, soon after, despite having temporary separations. Calvin catches Nige Foster (Sam Townend) dealing drugs and, knowing he sells them to Sasha, takes the drugs and tells him to leave. However, Calvin's colleague, Eddie find the drugs and believes Calvin has an addiction. With Warren, Calvin accidentally kills Nige and is guilt-ridden. Carmel and Calvin marry, however before, Calvin goes to The Loft during a drugs raid and removes Warren's drugs for him. Meanwhile, Carmel is waiting to be wed. Calvin arrives late and apologises before getting married. After the honeymoon, Calvin decides he needs to reflect over his guilt of killing Nige and Carmel is angered upon his disappearance.

When he returns, Calvin begins to deal drugs for Warren. Calvin agrees to take part in a raid on The Loft with Mark Gascoyne (Craig Russell). Not having time to warn Warren about the raid, Calvin goes along with Mark and two other men, whom he later discovers are not police officers and that the raid is unofficial. Mark gets Calvin to attack Warren with a baseball bat, which he does. Calvin then calls for an ambulance. Calvin informs Carmel about the drug deals and Nige's death. Carmel then splits up with Calvin and moves back in with her family. Angry Calvin decides to get Warren to confess to Sean Kennedy's (Matthew Jay Lewis) murder. Calvin records the confession on a tape and is shocked when Warren also says he killed Louise on their wedding day. As Warren is arrested, Calvin discovers the recorder has not worked and that Warren is free. Warren begins a relationship with Sasha, much to Calvin's hatred. As Sasha turns her back on her family, Warren's life begins to shatter and he ends up hitting foster brother Spencer Gray (Darren John Langford), who then moves into the Valentines. Clare has returned and has taken Warren hostage in The Loft. Calvin walks in and finds them and decides to call the police, however he remembers how much hurt his family has been put through and leaves Warren's fate in Clare's hands. Warren then presumably dies and Calvin has to help save Hannah Ashworth (Emma Rigby) and Justin Burton (Chris Fountain) from the flames.

Calvin begins to struggle to get a job and also with money. Ash Roy (Junade Khan) offers Calvin money in an illegal fight with his brother, Ravi Roy (Stephen Uppal). Calvin takes part in the fight but ends up losing. Spencer becomes more needy for Calvin, who gets a new job in security. Spencer wants to go bowling but Calvin has to work. Calvin then quits his job and says he could not handle looking after Spencer. Calvin and Spencer begin to rebuild The Loft together with the help of Malachy Fisher (Glen Wallace). Spencer begins playing with a saw and is seen by Malachy, who panics and rushes down the stairs, cutting his arm in the process. Calvin then stops Spencer helping him due to his HIV as Malachy's wife and Carmel's sister, Mercedes Fisher (Jennifer Metcalfe), arrives and helps Malachy, wondering why no one else is. Spencer begins to get out of hand, vandalising Drive 'n' Buy and attacking Mercedes. Calvin appears to be getting closer to Cheryl Brady (Bronagh Waugh), who begins helping with Spencer. However, Calvin cannot cope and decides to put Spencer in a care home.

Spencer regularly visits, and gives Calvin and Sasha jobs in The Loft when it reopens. However, Mercedes and Malachy tell the three they are taking legal action over Malachy's accident. Cheryl resolves the matter by making Spencer give Malachy and Mercedes bar jobs. When Calvin finds all of the local college students getting free alcohol from Spencer, he accuses Dave Colburn (Elliot James Langridge) of taking advantage, and eventually punches him. After Mercedes and Malachy's marriage hits a rocky patch, Calvin and Mercedes have a heart-to-heart. They both back off when Mercedes kisses him. Mercedes makes it clear she loves Malachy. However, the pair continue flirting as are clearly attracted to each other. Spencer witnesses Calvin and Mercedes about to kiss, but assumes it is due to the mistletoe. When Calvin and Mercedes are alone in The Loft office, they begin kissing and undressing. Malachy returns and walks in on them. Devastated, he leaves without notifying them. The next day, he pretends he did not see Mercedes and Calvin, who continue their affair. Not long after Malchy's brother Kris Fisher (Gerard McCarthy) catches them yet Malachy still refuses to confront the pair, hoping to cling on to Mercedes. After Cheryl and her fiancée Gilly Roach (Anthony Quinlan) split up, Calvin shares a kiss with her.

Calvin continues his affair with Mercedes until Carmel agrees to give their relationship another try. Mercedes is upset and jealous that Calvin has ended things with her and spots an opportunity for revenge when Carmel confides in her that Calvin left Warren to die. A shocked Mercedes rushes to tell Sasha, who is distraught and tells Calvin he is dead to her. Lauren and Sasha tell Leo that if he does not tell Calvin to leave they will, and Calvin is given no choice but to move into the McQueens. After an argument, Carmel realises how much Calvin means to her and proposes, to which he agrees. The pair begin their wedding plans, but Calvin has a one-night stand with Carmel's cousin, Theresa McQueen (Jorgie Porter). Calvin tells Sasha to tell the police that Lauren's boyfriend Gaz Bennett (Joel Goonan) attacked her in order to keep him away from Lauren. Calvin also angers Jake by refusing to give him his job back. In the run up to the wedding, Calvin receives death threats from racist Des Townsend (Kris Deedigan). Mercedes lures Calvin to a hotel where she sleeps with him again and confesses she loves him. Because of the death threats he has been receiving, Calvin gets hold of a gun which is stolen by Lauren following an argument with Mercedes. Mercedes tells her sister Jacqui McQueen (Claire Cooper) about the affair and Jacqui finds the gun at the Valentines' home and steals it. A number of other things happen to Calvin on his wedding day, including punching Zak Ramsey (Kent Riley) for his racial abuse, being confronted by Malachy about the affair, Spencer finding out he left Warren to die and Theresa telling him she's pregnant. Calvin is shocked to learn Theresa is pregnant, and tells her she must have an abortion. He tells Carmel that Theresa is pregnant, but does not admit to being the father. As he has his first dance with Carmel, an upset Theresa steals the gun from Jacqui's bag and shoots Calvin, and he dies from his injury.

In 2011, Calvin appears as a ghost for a one-off episode. Upon hearing that his daughter, Kathleen-Angel, may not survive, Carmel goes to the church to pray. It is there where she sees Calvin's ghost and he tells her that Kathleen-Angel will be safe.

11 years later, when John Paul is accused for his boyfriend George Kiss murder, Thersea mentions to his father Sally St. Claire (Annie Wallace) that how she regret killing Calvin for the rest of her life.

== Reception ==
Ricky Whittle was nominated for 'Sexiest Male' in the 2007, 2008 and 2009 British Soap Awards Whittle was also nominated for 'Sexiest Male' at the Inside Soap Awards in 2007, 2008 and 2009. Also in 2008, he and Gemma Merna (Carmel) were nominated for 'Best Couple'. In 2010, Calvin and Carmel's wedding was nominated for 'Best Wedding', losing to Syed Masood and Amira Shah of EastEnders. The character was selected as one of the "top 100 British soap characters" by industry experts for a poll to be run by What's on TV, with readers able to vote for their favourite character to discover "Who is Soap's greatest Legend?"

Whittle was also popular within the show's cast. After the announcement of his departure, Whittle's co-star Bronagh Waugh (who plays Cheryl Brady) said: "His was one of the first characters I came into contact with — I'll miss him greatly. Ricky's quite similar to me. He's a bundle of energy and positivity. We bounce around the building and have fun and joke, and we like the same music. I really will miss him but understand why he wants to go. He's had a fabulous couple of years. He's done everything he can do and it's time to move on. He's proved he's got so many skills and things to offer."

Ruth Deller of entertainment website Lowculture has criticised Calvin on different instances, once stating: "Currently topping the ‘which Hollyoaks character is the worst’ poll on the forums at the moment, Calvin may look nice with his shirt off, but his misogynistic, patronising, whiney attitude is doing him no favours at all. It's even making people sympathise a bit with Carmel, and we all know she's a no good dirty boob-thief." Deller later criticised him again, writing: "Calvin Valentine, Hollyoaks, Last month’s winner (or loser, I suppose) continues to annoy, behave implausibly and maintain his self-righteous prickness, and was only usurped for a very good reason…"

In her book Soap Stars, Debbie Foy features Whittle in one of her profile features and describes Calvin as the following: "Calvin has been fiercely protective of the family. Calvin is a likable character, witty and intelligent, who wants to do the right thing." Virgin Media compiled a list of their sexiest soap couples, Calvin and Carmel were featured and they stated: "Couples don’t come much cuter than these two – they even have matching police uniforms! The Valentines may be a little lacking in the brain cell department, but they more than make up for it by being the biggest-hearted couple in soap."
