= Sasha Valentine =

Fictional character from Hollyoaks

- Hollyoaks character
- Portrayed by: Nathalie Emmanuel
- Duration: 2006–2010
- First appearance: 17 July 2006
- Last appearance: 13 August 2010
- Introduced by: Bryan Kirkwood
- Spin-off appearances: Hollyoaks Later (2008); Hollyoaks: The Morning After the Night Before (2009)
In-universe information
- Occupation: Barmaid
- Father: Leo Valentine
- Mother: Diane Valentine
- Brothers: Calvin Valentine; Sonny Valentine
- Half-brothers: Danny Valentine
- Half-sisters: Lauren Valentine
- Nieces: Kathleen-Angel McQueen

Sasha Valentine is a fictional character from the British Channel 4 soap opera Hollyoaks, played by Nathalie Emmanuel. Sasha first appeared on-screen on 17 July 2006 as part of the newly introduced Valentine family. Sasha has been at the centre of many high-profile storylines including use of recreational drugs, a heroin addiction and a subsequent overdose, prostitution, a victim of a series of violent attacks, portraying a gangster's moll and binge drinking. In March 2010, Paul Marquess announced that 11 characters are to depart the show which included Sasha. Although it was initially reported Emmanuel was axed, Ricky Whittle confirmed she had planned to leave at the end of her contract. Emmanuel left in 2010 and was later credited on 1 December 2010 for a flashback episode.

== Character development ==
=== Characterisation ===
E4 described Sasha as a "smart girl with a nose for trouble much to the dismay of her older brother Calvin. She's a major flirt and once she sets her sight on her man there's no going back until she gets exactly what she wants!". Emmanuel described Sasha as having an "addictive personality" and as being "very immature. I think it comes down to her general lack of judgement!-she's actually very unsure of herself". On the character's development Emmanuel said "I do think Sasha will change, growing more independent but she will always be vulnerable due to her tragic experiences so far in her short life," said the 20-year-old. I think Sasha's character before the drugs and Warren was very shy and not overly confident in herself. The thrill from drugs and bad boy Warren gave her the confidence that she craves. The loss of her mother and her inconsistency of her dads parenting doesn't give her a secure environment and so she feels insignificant within her family." BBC America described the character as "the quiet, observing type. The youngest member of the Valentine family, she is also the glue that holds them together, the peaceful center in a tornado of madness. She's constantly rolling her eyes at her brother Sonny's antics. She also has an unrequited crush on Sonny's best friend, Justin Burton, but she's managed to remain relationship-free while in Hollyoaks." The Daily Star described her as a wild child and "not a bad girl at heart".

== Storylines ==
Sasha arrives in the village with her mother, Diane (Pauline Black), and brothers, Calvin (Ricky Whittle) and Sonny (Devon Anderson). Sasha is close to her mother, and is distraught when Diane is killed in a hit-and-run accident by Jake Dean (Kevin Sacre). Sasha, Calvin, and Sonny's father, Leo Valentine (Brian Bovell), arrives soon after Diane's death and moves into their home. Sasha is the only one to remember Diane's birthday, so she goes to her graveside with Justin Burton (Chris Fountain). Justin accuses his ex-girlfriend Becca Dean (Ali Bastian) of seducing him when he was a minor, and begin living in the Valentine home because of his friendship with Sonny. He smokes cannabis, and offers her some, which she refuses. She covers for him by telling Calvin she was the one who was smoking, which leads to some conflict between brother and sister. She tries to win over Justin's favour by waiting for him in Sonny's bedroom while Sonny is out. When Justin came in nothing happens between them because it was too soon after Becca. They sleep together after Becca is imprisoned. He tells her she was too young and they couldn't see each other. She soon stops trying to seduce him and they begin a friendship.

Sasha achieves straight A's in her GCSE exams, and around this time develops a crush on Fletch. Michaela is also interested in him, and seduces him when he comes over to her house. Sasha goes out with him the next day, and is about to take the relationship further if Michaela had not walked in on them, revealing that she had slept with him. Sasha's father-daughter dinner with Leo is interrupted by a woman crashing through a window. The woman is Valerie Holden (Samantha Giles), whom her father had an affair with and the two teenagers are her half-siblings, Danny (David Judge) and Lauren (Dominique Jackson).

Fletch takes up drugs and offers Josh and Sasha them, but they refuse. Later that night, Valerie takes Sasha out clubbing. This results in Valerie and Katy Fox (Hannah Tointon) having a fight and Sasha and Valerie being thrown out. They are then arrested by Calvin and spend night in the cells. After overhearing an argument between Valerie and Leo in which he calls her boring she leaves to find Fletch who gives her some cannabis, which she smokes. During Niall Rafferty's (Barry Sloane) party, Sasha and Fletch took some Speed. Sasha hallucinates and sees her father angry at her for taking speed. Sasha complains that her heart is beating extremely fast and won't stop, she also complains her jaw and stomach was hurting. Sasha was then sick before Lauren found her. On 11 February, Sasha and Calvin have an argument after he catches her smoking weed with Fletch, and Sasha started mocking him and Carmel McQueen (Gemma Merna). Calvin pushes Sasha causing her to bang her head on the wooden staircase. Sasha moves out of the Valentine's and into Amy and Ste's. Sasha and Fletch decided to take heroin. But the morning after they take the heroin Sasha and Fletch suffer a massive comedown in Amy and Ste's bathroom. Ste finds out and chucks Sasha and Fletch out the flat for taking the heroin. After this Sasha moves back in with the rest of the Valentine's. Sasha is caught in bed with Fletch by her father so -later buys heroin from a drug dealer named Nige. Sasha and Fletch suffer a painful comedown in Sasha's bedroom . She is sick and suffers from nausea and paranoia.

On 23 April 2008, Sasha was dumped by Fletch and then went round to Ste's an asked him for heroin. She asks Ste to inject the heroin into her wrists, but Sasha soon collapses. Ste panics and drags her into the village and leaves her in an alleyway. Calvin finds Sasha and she is rushed to hospital. The following day Sasha wakes up in hospital and is confronted by Calvin. To fund their heroin habit Sasha and Fletch begin stealing from locals including friends and family. Fletch tried to rob Drive 'n' Buy but was caught by Josh, whilst Sasha stole possessions from her brother Danny to fund her heroin habit. Sasha and Fletch steal a laptop from school using Leo's keys. However they are caught by Lauren and are forced to give the laptop back. On 4 June 2008 Sasha became desperate for more heroin and resorted to having sex with Nige for drugs. Nige promises that he will give Sasha more drugs if Sasha has sex with him. Afterwards Sasha asks for her drugs but Nige leaves Sasha with nothing. Nige tells Fletch about him and Sasha, Fletch dumps Sasha and refuses to give her heroin. Sasha finds Fletch slumped in an alleyway barely conscious after he had just finished a fix, Sasha still desperate for more heroin searched through Fletch's bag and pockets looking for heroin she could steal, but finds nothing. Fletch asks Sasha to run away to London with him, however, Sasha turns down the offer. However, Sasha has finally overcome her drug use, with the help of her family. On the day Sasha got her exam results back, Fletch returns, convincing Sasha he is clean. In the park, he is talking to her when she discovers marks on his hands, discovering he has been injecting himself with heroin. Fletch then mugs her. In Hollyoaks Later in November 2008, Sasha and the Dirty Diegos take part in the battle of the band competition in Liverpool, with the opportunity to tour with The Saturdays. After making friends with Vanessa White and Frankie Sandford in the toilets, Frankie and Vanessa later invite her on tour, which she immediately accepts.

Sasha begins a friendship with Warren Fox's mentally disabled foster brother, Spencer Gray, but is using Spencer as a means to get closer to Warren. They begin a relationship which is short-lived when a hate campaign against Warren was started by Clare Devine and Warren was killed in a fire at The Loft. In Hollyoaks: The Morning After the Night Before, Sasha decides to go to Manchester where Josh and Dave Colburn were. She is followed by a strange man but Josh stop him harming her. She and Josh later sleep together.On a night out with Dave and his friends Sasha is arrested for attempting to drive a car while on drugs and without a licence. Sasha is attacked in an alleyway by a mystery person after a night out. After telling Michaela about it Michaela advised her to tell the police, if not for her sake for other girls' sakes however Sasha decided against it. She is involved in a car crash but is mainly unscathed. When Sasha spots an article in the paper about another girl being attacked she opens up to Calvin who supports her and encourages her to tell the police which she does, the incident seems to strengthen her bond with her brother. Her new-found trust in Calvin doesn't last long however as Mercedes tells her, he left Warren to die. Sasha is horrified and when she confronts Calvin, he claims he did it for her. Sasha makes it clear to everyone that Calvin is dead to her. She then gives the Valentines an ultimatum to either choose between her and Calvin. The family decides to stick by Sasha and forces Calvin to move out. Sash leaves to live in London with Lauren and her step mother.

== Reception ==
The Metro described Sasha's time on the show as "Teenager Sasha has been through so much - family troubles, heroin addiction and a dangerously addictive relationship with bad boy Warren Fox". On the character MSN said "You name it, Sasha's been there". Adam Beresford from Digital Spy called the character "baby-faced" and wrote that she "certainly had a turbulent time on the show" due to drug addictions, prostitution and her relationship with Warren. Marianna Manson from Closer Online put Sasha on her list of the 11 most iconic black characters in British soap operas, writing, "The Valentine family certainly had PLENTY of drama in Hollyoaks, and Sasha - who starred on the show between 2006 and 2010 – was no exception. After a battle with heroin and sordid affair with Warren Fox, Sasha left the North for London", and added that Emmanuel had gone on to "do some BIG things" since leaving the soap."
