= InStyle =

American monthly womens fashion magazine

- Cover of the March 2019 issue, featuring Brie Larson
- Editor: Sally Holmes
- Categories: Celebrity, human interest, news
- Total circulation: 1,810,539 (US) (2013)
- First issue: June 1994; 32 years ago
- Final issue: March 2022; 4 years ago (print)
- Company: People Inc.
- Country: United States
- Based in: New York City
- Language: English
- Website: instyle.com (US)
- ISSN: 1076-0830

InStyle is an American monthly women's fashion magazine founded in 1994. It is owned by People Inc., and started originally as a brand extension of People before carving out its own identity. In February 2022, it was announced that InStyle would cease print publications and move to a digital-only format.

== Description ==
The magazines content included beauty, fashion, home, entertaining, philanthropy, celebrity lifestyles, feminism, and human-interest stories.

In 2018, InStyle became the first major fashion magazine to ban photography of and advertisements featuring fur. The ban on fur intended to showcase the animal cruelty necessary to produce fur garments, and to encourage others to refrain from fur consumption. The organization PETA was supportive of the editorial change.

Dotdash Meredith, the media group that acquired InStyle in 2021, announced that they would be terminating the publication's print issues. InStyle's final print publication was the April 2022 issue. InStyle subsequently became digital-only. Neil Vogel, CEO of Dotdash Meredith, stated that the magazine would move to an all digital format because "print is no longer serving the brand's core purpose."

== Editors ==
Editors of InStyle
Country	Circulation dates	Editors	Start year	End year	Ref.
United States (InStyle)	1994–2022	Martha Nelson	1993	2002	
United States (InStyle)	1994–2022	Charla Lawhon	2002	2008	
United States (InStyle)	1994–2022	Ariel Foxman	2008	2016	
United States (InStyle)	1994–2022	Laura Brown	2016	2022	
United States (InStyle)	1994–2022	Sally Holmes	2023	present	

== International editions ==
InStyle International editions are listed below

- InStyle Australia (closed in 2020, since 2022 | Edited by Justine Cullen)
- InStyle Brazil
- InStyle China 优家画报 (since 2017)
- InStyle Czech
- InStyle Germany (Edited by Sophie Grützner)
- InStyle Greece
- InStyle Hungary
- InStyle Indonesia
- InStyle Mexico
- InStyle Polska (from 2008 to 2018)
- InStyle Romania
- InStyle Russia
- InStyle South Africa (from 2006 to 2007)
- InStyle South Korea
- InStyle Spain
- InStyle Taiwan
- InStyle Thailand
- InStyle Turkey
- InStyle UK (from 2001 to 2016)

=== InStyle Australia ===
In July 2020, Bauer Media Australia and New Zealand (publisher of InStyle Australia) announced that the magazine would be axed. This was blamed on a drop in advertising revenue due to the COVID-19 pandemic, other axed titles included Harper's Bazaar Australia, Elle Australia and more.

The magazine however returned in 2022 when the rights were acquired by True North Media.
