= Malachy Fisher =

Fictional character from Hollyoaks

- Hollyoaks character
- Portrayed by: Glen Wallace
- Duration: 2007–2010
- First appearance: 20 March 2007
- Last appearance: 18 November 2010
- Introduced by: Bryan Kirkwood
- Spin-off appearances: Hollyoaks Later (2008)
In-universe information
- Occupation: Builder (2007–2008); Bartender (2009–2010); Doorman (2010)
- Father: Eamon Fisher
- Mother: Erin Fisher
- Brothers: Kris Fisher
- Sisters: Bernadette Fisher
- Wife: Mercedes McQueen (2008–2010)

Malachy Fisher is a fictional character from the British Channel 4 soap opera Hollyoaks, played by Glen Wallace. Malachy first appeared in 2007 on a recurring basis and became a permanent character in 2008. The character has been noted for being at the centre of an HIV plot. In July 2010, it was announced that the character was to leave the show. The character was later killed off in a structure fire. He made his final appearance on 18 November 2010.

== Creation ==
Malachy initially appeared in only three episodes, a gruff builder who was appalled to learn his brother was a bisexual cross dresser. Actor Glen Wallace got on well with Gerard McCarthy, as they had known each other since they were teenagers. He said producers were "keen" on his work and brought him back for another nine episodes to see if he could be integrated into the canvas. After an absence of several months, they gave him a year-long contract.

== Development ==
A central part of Malachy's character was his discovery in September 2008 that he had HIV. Wallace said he was "taken aback" when he heard about the story, but felt the storyline was very important, as national TV had not covered the topic since EastEnders character Mark Fowler. He knew many people never believed they could get HIV, and hoped his character's own ignorance might make some of them change their minds.

Malachy's main love interest was Mercedes McQueen. Wallace described Mercedes and Malachy as "very alike, they are two alpha characters and everything is about them – that sounds a bit harsh!" Their relationship was jeopardised when he exposed her to HIV, but they married in the final episode of the first series of Hollyoaks Later.

In May 2009, Wallace revealed his contract had been extended, which he appreciated, he stated: "I think there's a lot more to be got from the HIV storyline and to have someone come in and die off straight away is unrealistic anyway."

== Storylines ==
Malachy first appears in 2007 for a surprise visit to his brother Kris. Kris hides his bisexuality and cross dressing from Malachy, who sleeps with Kris' girlfriend Jessica Harris. Malachy finds Kris kissing a man and shows his homophobia towards him. He then leaves, before returning later in 2007 where he befriends Jake Dean and continues to be homophobic towards Kris. Malachy then leaves.

Malachy returns to Hollyoaks to find his father Eamon in July 2008. He and Kris make up and begin to build up their relationship. Malachy meets Mercedes McQueen. The pair begin a casual relationship and start to fall in love. Malachy and Kris go to donate blood and Kris is angered after he discovers he cannot give blood due to his sexual orientation. Later, Malachy gets results from the doctor, revealing he is HIV positive. Malachy is shocked and cannot come to terms with the diagnosis. Despite his condition, Malachy continues his relationship with Mercedes and involves in unprotected sex with her. Malachy leaves and turns to alcohol. During this time, Mercedes sleeps with Kris. Malachy returns and admits the truth to Kris, who realises he and Mercedes could now be infected. Mercedes is devastated and attacks Malachy. Malachy and Kris are horrified when they discover Eamon is dead and attack Darren Osborne for pretending Jack Osborne was Eamon in order to claim on life insurance. Mercedes struggles to cope with the death of her sister Tina and the prospect of having HIV. Malachy and Mercedes are united in grief for the loss of loved ones. Kris and Malachy head off back to Northern Ireland with their father's ashes. Whilst there, Mercedes pushes Malachy to admit to his family about his condition, he eventually does and the pair get back together and marry on 28 November.

Malachy and Mercedes return in January 2009 from their honeymoon without any money or a home. Their marriage is strained when Mercedes gets her HIV test results back and reveals she does not have it. Malachy thinks Mercedes will leave him, however she reassures him. They move into the McQueen household. Myra McQueen struggles to live with Malachy and believes she will catch HIV, this angers him and Mercedes. Mercedes becomes worried about Malachy's health when he catches the flu. She urges him to see a doctor, thinking it is his HIV. After seeing the doctor, Malachy is given the all clear and told it is not the HIV. During this time, Malachy's ex-girlfriend Cheryl Brady turns up in the village and continues to taunt Mercedes and flirt with Malachy. She later tells them she is over Malachy.

When Malachy was helping rebuild The Loft with Calvin Valentine and Spencer Gray. Malachy saw Spencer playing with a metal saw and rushed down to stop him, but ended up cutting his arm. Mercedes saw this and rushed to his side. To stop Malachy and Mercedes suing for the accident Calvin gave them both jobs at the loft. Malachy also resumed his friendship with Jake Dean when he was released from a mental institute. On 18 December Malachy walked in on Mercedes and Calvin about to have sex he runs out devastated and keeps the truth to himself. Kris also finds out about the affair. During a drunken evening Malachy kisses Cheryl but won't go any further. When Calvin can't find a best man for his wedding to Mercedes sister Carmel Valentine he asks Malachy. During the wedding, Malachy confronts Mercedes and Calvin separately telling Mercedes their marriage is over. Malachy intended to shoot Calvin however couldn't go through with it. When Calvin is shot dead by Mercedes' cousin Theresa McQueen, Malachy blames Mercedes. When Mercedes is questioned by the police Malachy tells them it was him, however he is released as they know he is only trying to save Mercedes.

The last straw comes for Malachy when Carmel reveals that Theresa killed Calvin and Mercedes has been hiding the truth all along. Malachy leaves for Belfast but Mercedes catches up with him and tells him she wants them to start a fresh.

Malachy comes back to Hollyoaks still not over Mercedes' affair. After pouring his heart out to a girl named Veronica he takes her back to his place where they begin to undress. Veronica ties Malachy to the bed, thinking it's some kind of game however, she leaves him there whilst she robs the house and Evissa. After this Malachy tells Mercedes he's leaving her for good.

Malachy moves in with Cheryl, her brother Brendan Brady and best friend Lynsey Nolan. Malachy clashes with Brenden on numerous occasions, especially after catching him stealing from Cheryl's club Chez Chez. As Lynsey is an ex of Kris's, she and Malachy get on well and it soon becomes clear that they have feelings for each other. Neither of them wants to do anything about it because of Cheryl, however eventually they begin a secret relationship.

Lynsey is fed up with having to keep their secret. Malachy consoles her by kissing her in the middle of the village unbeknownst to them Mercedes is watching. Mercedes, jealous that Malachy's moving on, lies that he has infected with HIV making him realise how much he still loves her. When Lynsey finds out that Mercedes and Malachy plan on getting back together, she goes through Mercedes medical records to find she has lied. Lynsey breaks the news to Malachy who punches Mercedes. Lynsey is shocked by his aggression and wants nothing more to do with him.

Malachy decides to leave, but is tricked into having dinner with Mercedes by Myra. He wants to apologise to Mercedes because he feels bad about hitting her. Mercedes tells him that he only hit her because she pushed him to it, and that she pushed him so hard because she still loves him. After spending the night babysitting Angel, they decide to get back together, get a house and have a baby of their own. As Malachy and Mercedes celebrate, walking through the village, an explosion in II Gnosh which was caused by Dominic Reilly under the orders of Warren Fox, throws them both to the ground. Malachy pushes Mercedes out the way just in time but he is badly injured by the blast and is rushed to hospital. He is in a stable condition at first, but when Mercedes was dreaming that Malachy is discharged and talks to him that she wants to have a family, she is interrupted by Cheryl who says that she heard the news. When Mercedes is confused, she turns around and is horrified to see that Malachy is still lying in his hospital bed, but only for him to fall into a coma, causing him to be on a life support machine.

The doctors tell Mercedes and Lynsey that there is nothing more they can do. Kris arrives and tells Mercedes that there is no way that she is switching off the life support machine. Malachy appears to Mercedes, helping her to make the decision to switch off his life-support machine. Kris and Mercedes decide to allow the life-support machine to be switched off. Cheryl, Lynsey, Mercedes and Kris say goodbye to Malachy as the machine is turned off. Afterwards, still in the hospital, Malachy appears to Mercedes one last time to tell her that he loves her, signalling that he is truly moving on.
