= Barnaby Bear =

Barnaby Bear may refer to:

- "Barnaby Bear", the English name given to Colargol, the 1970s Franco-Polish children's character when the show was broadcast by the BBC
- "Barnaby Bear", the English name for Rasmus Klump, a Danish comic strip
- Becky and Barnaby Bear, a children's television series formerly shown on the BBC's CBeebies channel
