= Danny Valentine =

UK soap opera character, created 2007

- Hollyoaks character
- Portrayed by: David Judge
- Duration: 2007–2008
- First appearance: 6 September 2007
- Last appearance: 12 September 2008
- Created by: Bryan Kirkwood
In-universe information
- Occupation: Technician
- Father: Leo Valentine
- Mother: Valerie Holden
- Sisters: Lauren Valentine
- Half-brothers: Calvin Valentine; Sonny Valentine
- Half-sisters: Sasha Valentine

Danny Valentine is a fictional character from the British Channel 4 soap opera Hollyoaks, played by David Judge. He first appeared in 2007 and made his final appearance in 2008.

== Character creation ==
=== Background ===
Danny is the illegitimate child of Leo Valentine (Brian Bovell) who first arrived in the village in September 2007, when his mother Valerie Holden (Samantha Giles) drops him and his sister Lauren (Dominique Jackson), off at the Valentine residence and demanded that Leo looks after them while she takes up a free holiday in Greece. Danny and Lauren were totally unknown to their half-siblings Calvin (Ricky Whittle), Sonny (Devon Anderson), and Sasha (Nathalie Emmanuel), and it was not until Lauren referred to Leo as "dad" that they realised that Leo had been living a double life. Danny has shown to be extremely protective of Lauren and Sasha with her drug problems.

=== Casting ===
Judge's casting was announced on 13 August 2007. In a turn of events, the actor was sacked from the series on 10 July 2008, due to "persistent bad time-keeping". This mirrored a similar situation which cost Devon Anderson, who portrayed Danny's on-screen brother Sonny, his job in January 2007.

== Storylines ==
Much more than his sister Lauren, Danny adapts to his new family, becoming friendly with Calvin and forging a better relationship with him than he has with his other brother, Sonny. When Valerie decides to remain in Greece, Danny and Lauren plan to join her. However, when Lauren decides she wants to stay, Danny also remains in the village. He expresses an interest in Mercedes McQueen (Jennifer Metcalfe) when attending Sarah Barnes (Loui Batley) and Craig Dean's (Guy Burnet) engagement party.

Danny befriends Justin Burton (Chris Fountain) and initially tries to help him forget about Katy Fox (Hannah Tointon). However, he soon realises Justin is only interested in winning back Katy's affections and tries giving him support by dressing up as a policeman to lead Katy to a table set out for a romantic dinner, which proves to be unsuccessful. At the Freshers Ball, Danny convinces Justin that this is the opportunity to reconcile with Katy, however this also fails when she believes Justin was arguing with her new best friend, John Paul McQueen (James Sutton), when he was actually trying to stop an argument between John Paul and Nancy Hayton (Jessica Fox). Danny tries to impress Steph Dean (Carley Stenson) after helping her fix a burst beer pipe at The Dog in the Pond public house. She offers him a free drink, which he then insists she have with him after her shift. However, she promises Danny she would go for a drink with him anytime, which he tries to take advantage of the following day. When Steph agrees to go out again, Danny begins flirting with her and upsets her by trying to say how his status would be advanced if he dated her. Eventually, this results in Steph dating Max Cunningham (Matt Littler).

When the hot water boiler in the Halls breaks, Jessica Harris (Jennifer Biddall) offers Danny £50 to fix the boiler. Despite telling her he has little experience fixing boilers, Danny agrees to help. While examining the box, he notices a hole which is causing the pilot light to go out. While Jessica's back is turned, Danny blocks up the hole with newspaper. Unfortunately, this causes a buildup of carbon monoxide. Later, at a housewarming party for John Paul and Kris Fisher (Gerard McCarthy), the gas causes everyone to feel ill. Danny leaves with Mercedes before the others begin to lose consciousness. Danny and Mercedes go to the SU Bar and kiss, and were interrupted by a phonecall from Justin, saying that the party guests are unconscious. They rush back to the party and Danny helps Justin save the guests. Danny refuses a lift from Darren Osborne (Ashley Taylor Dawson), who suggests he ought to go to hospital to be checked, but Danny flees. Jessica visits him the following day, suggesting that the two of them keep a low profile. However, Danny cannot handle the guilt and confesses the truth to Mercedes. Jacqui McQueen (Claire Cooper) overhears, threatening to beat Danny up, but Mercedes protects him. Later, Jacqui and Myra McQueen (Nicole Barber-Lane) force Danny into confessing that Jessica was the one who allowed him to fix the boiler. Myra and Jacqui then threaten to sue Jessica. A few days later, Myra takes some money Jessica was given by Zoe Carpenter (Zoë Lister), resulting in the McQueens forgetting the incident.

Danny meets Hannah Ashworth (Emma Rigby) at the SU Bar and both are instantly attracted to each other. With encouragement from Sarah, Nancy and Beth Clement (Sinéad Moynihan), Hannah offers Danny her phone number. They begin with a passionate kiss behind the bike sheds at HCC. While Justin and Danny are attempting to turn on the Christmas lights for the village, Danny is electrocuted and causes a blackout. He recovers almost immediately, and goes to The Dog with Hannah, Katy and Justin. He joins Justin and Katy in a drinking game which involved shoveling crushed crisps down their throat, unaware that Hannah is struggling from eating disorders. When Hannah refuses to participate, Danny asks if she is on a diet, causing Hannah to flee to the toilets. Justin forces a reluctant Katy to go after Hannah, and informs Danny of Hannah's eating disorders. When Hannah returns, Danny supports her and apologises for his comments. Hannah later asks Danny out again and the two went to Il Gnosh. Danny decides it would be romantic if they ordered spaghetti and met in the middle like in the animated film, Lady and the Tramp, holding a forkful of pasta to Hannah's face. This reminds Hannah of when her brother Josh Ashworth (Sonny Flood) force-fed her during her anorexia nervosa, causing her panic and flee. After reconciling, Danny's ex-fiancée, Michelle, arrives in the village. It transpires that Danny told Michelle he was leaving to join the army, unable to officially separate from her. Hannah manages to handle herself when Michelle brands her "Barbie", but wonders what other lies Danny has told. Danny and Hannah later make up at Sarah's house party. Danny later dumps Hannah again when he accuses her of taking things too slow. Hannah is crushed and tries to accept it initially, but discovering that the real reason is because her father Neville Ashworth (Jim Millea) dislikes Danny was because he is black, Hannah reconciles with Danny. Danny backs out of the relationship once more, causing her to have a relapse in her recovery from anorexia. This makes Danny realise that he wants to be with Hannah and support her in her recovery, and so they reconcile once again.

However, following a drunken evening at The Dog with Nancy, Hannah is accompanied home by Darren. When Hannah is fixing her top, Darren takes an incriminating photograph of her on his mobile phone to convince Mercedes that he has slept with her and win a bet. Mercedes does not believe Darren but sends the photo to Danny, who punches Darren and dumps a bewildered Hannah, who has no memory of the photo being taken, and has sex with Mercedes. Danny later leaves the village to find his mother, Valerie, in Spain.

== Reception ==
Virgin Media say that while the character did caused some tense situations, Danny did have "a good heart". Charlotte Tutton from OK! wrote how Danny quickly became the "show's biggest heartthrob" who spent "months wooing Hannah", and also wrote that, despite only being on the soap for a year, Danny "is still one of the most memorable characters the soap has ever seen".
