= Missandei =

- A Song of Ice and Fire character Game of Thrones character
- Nathalie Emmanuel as Missandei
- First appearance: Literature: A Storm of Swords (2000); Television: "Valar Dohaeris" (2013)
- Last appearance: Television: "The Last of the Starks" (2019)
- Created by: George R. R. Martin
- Portrayed by: Nathalie Emmanuel

In-universe information
- Gender: Female
- Title: Queen's Personal Advisor
- Occupation: Advisor to the Queen
- Relatives: Marselen (brother); Mossador (brother)
- Nationality: Naathi

Missandei, also known as Missandei of Naath, is a fictional character in the American television series Game of Thrones and the fantasy novel series A Song of Ice and Fire by American author George R. R. Martin. Missandei is a former slave who comes into the service of Daenerys Targaryen during the latter's conquest of Essos. She serves as Daenerys' interpreter and is one of her most trusted counselors throughout the series.

Missandei is portrayed by Nathalie Emmanuel in the HBO television adaptation, where her role is greatly expanded from that in the books.

== Character ==
=== Background ===
As children, Missandei and her three brothers were captured by raiders from the Basilisk Isles and sold into slavery in Astapor. Missandei's talent for learning languages was noticed by the masters of Astapor, who trained her as a scribe. Missandei's brothers Marselen and Mossador were made into Unsullied (the third brother is also made into an Unsullied but dies during his training). Missandei is an interpreter who becomes a close confidante and trusted advisor to Daenerys Targaryen. She is from the island of Naath, off the coast of Sothoryos. She is also a polyglot who speaks nineteen languages.

=== Overview ===
Missandei first appears in the book series at the age of 10 in 2000's A Storm of Swords. In the television series, she was introduced in the third season, already an adult in the role of a slave interpreter. She eventually dies near the end of the television series, while Grey Worm and Daenerys look on.

== Storylines ==
=== A Storm of Swords ===
Missandei is working as an interpreter for Astapori slaver Kraznys mo Nakloz when Daenerys Targaryen comes to inspect his army of Unsullied. After Daenerys strikes a bargain with the Good Masters of Astapor concerning payment for the Unsullied, Kraznys gives Missandei to Daenerys as an interpreter to give them commands. To Missandei's surprise, Daenerys frees her; having nowhere else to go, Missandei accepts Daenerys' offer to stay as her interpreter and handmaiden. Missandei subsequently accompanies Daenerys as she liberates the neighbouring cities of Yunkai and Meereen.

=== A Dance With Dragons ===
Missandei becomes Daenerys' herald, announcing her entry when she meets with the people of Meereen. After Mossador is killed by the Sons of the Harpy, Daenerys offers to let Missandei return to Naath; Missandei refuses, noting that she would be an easy target for slavers.

Following the reopening of the fighting pits and Daenerys' flight from Meereen with her dragon Drogon, Daenerys' new husband Hizdhar zo Loraq removes Missandei from her position as herald. With Daenerys' other servants Irri and Jhiqui joining the Dothraki in their search for Daenerys in the Dothraki Sea, Missandei is left as the only occupant in the Great Pyramid's royal apartments. When Barristan Selmy seizes control of Meereen, he has Missandei tend to the mortally wounded Quentyn Martell.

== TV adaptation ==
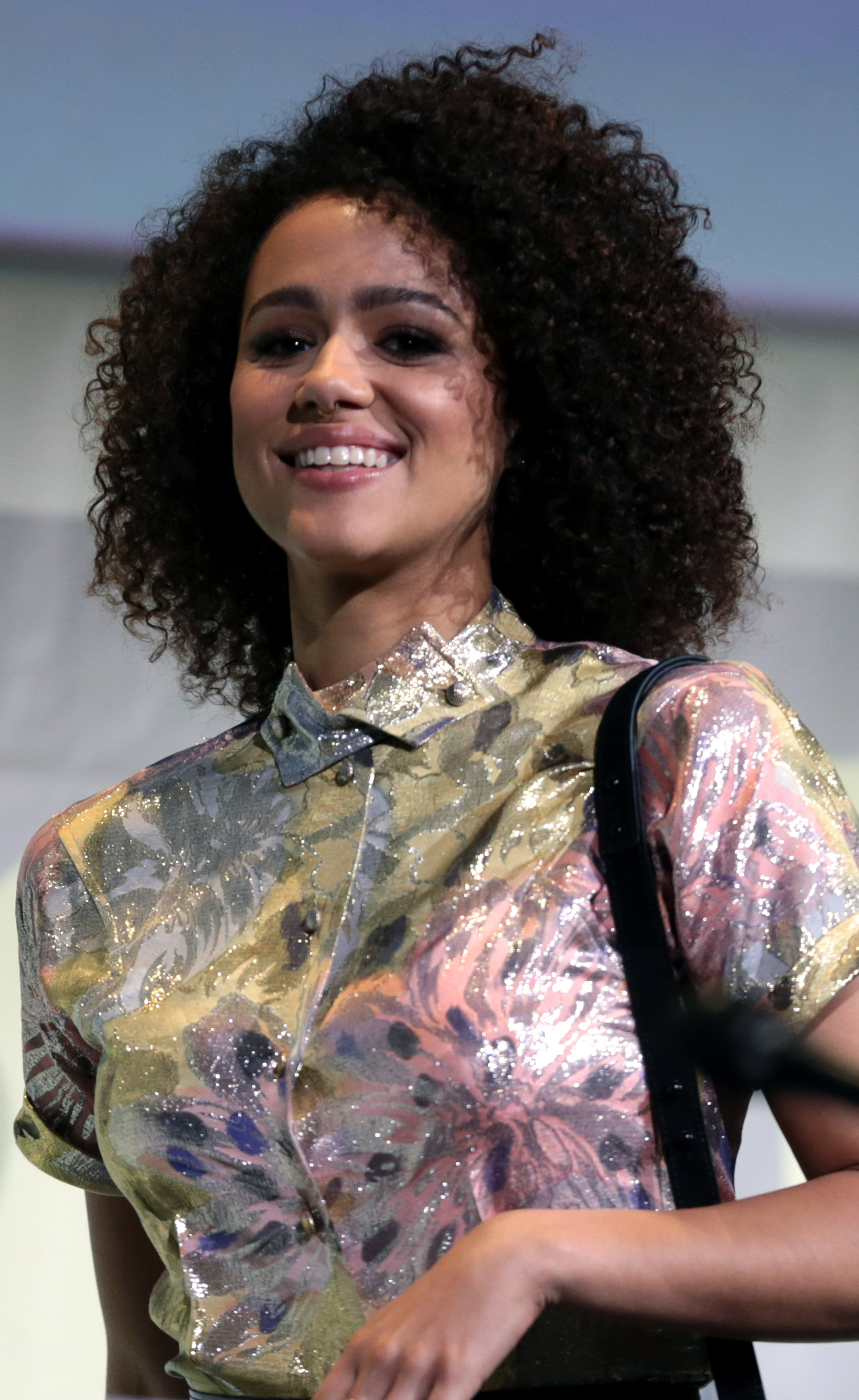
Nathalie Emmanuel plays the role of Missandei in the television series

Missandei was played by the British actress Nathalie Emmanuel in the television adaptation.

=== Season 3 ===
The story of Missandei in the third season of Game of Thrones closely tracks her story in A Storm of Swords. However, when Daenerys agrees to purchase Kraznys's Unsullied soldiers, she demands Missandei's services as part of the exchange; in the book, Kraznys gave her to Daenerys of his own accord.

=== Season 4 ===
In season 4, Missandei befriends Grey Worm, the commander of the Unsullied, and gives him lessons in the Common Tongue. While bathing in a stream she witnesses Grey Worm watching her; although she covers herself, she later admits to Grey Worm that she is glad he saw her. She expresses sorrow that Grey Worm was castrated during his training, though Grey Worm notes that if he had not become an Unsullied soldier he never would have met her.

=== Season 5 ===
In season 5, Grey Worm is gravely wounded in a skirmish with the Sons of the Harpy, and Missandei stands vigil by his side. When Grey Worm wakes he reveals to her that, in battle, he felt fear for the first time, fear that he would never see Missandei again; Missandei is clearly moved by his sentiment. When the Sons of the Harpy launch an attack at the reopening of the fighting pits, one of the Sons nearly kills Missandei before he is killed by Tyrion Lannister. Daenerys subsequently flies away on Drogon, and Daario Naharis decrees that Tyrion, Missandei, and Grey Worm should govern Meereen in her absence.

=== Season 6 ===
To keep the peace with the slavers, Tyrion grants them seven years to transition from slavery. Although Missandei helps defend Tyrion's decision to the outraged Meereenese freedman, in private she warns Tyrion that the masters will betray him. She is eventually vindicated, when the slavers send a fleet to lay siege to Meereen. She accompanies Daenerys to a parley with the slavers' representatives. When Daenerys leaves on Drogon to destroy the fleet, Missandei tells the masters that Daenerys has ordered one of their deaths as punishment for their treachery, though when two of them offer up the third Grey Worm kills those two instead. Missandei later accompanies Daenerys and her forces as they sail to Westeros.

=== Season 7 ===
Missandei is present throughout Daenerys's reclamation of her ancestral stronghold of Dragonstone. She presides over Jon Snow and Davos Seaworth's arrival at the island. Davos is quite taken with Missandei and inquires about her background, but she remains mysterious. Later, as the Unsullied prepare to leave for the seizure of Casterly Rock, Missandei goes to Grey Worm to talk about their feelings and the pair consummate their relationship. Missandei eventually reveals her entire backstory to Jon and Davos in an attempt to impress Daenerys' character upon them, though Jon remains openly skeptical and implies that Daenerys will not free Missandei from her service should she request it.

=== Season 8 ===
Missandei travels with Daenerys' court to Winterfell. Feeling unwelcome amongst the Northerns, she and Grey Worm plan to sail to Naath after Daenerys wins the Iron Throne. During the Long Night, Missandei shelters in the crypts, and survives the Night King's reanimation of the dead Starks in the crypts. After the defeat of the White Walkers, she accompanies Daenerys' forces to Dragonstone, but they are ambushed by Euron Greyjoy's fleet and Missandei is taken prisoner and brought to Cersei Lannister in King's Landing. Tyrion, Daenerys, and Grey Worm journey to King's Landing and Tyrion begs Cersei to surrender, but Cersei has Gregor Clegane behead Missandei. She is later avenged by Gregor's younger brother Sandor Clegane, who sacrifices himself to kill Gregor once and for all.

=== Recognition and awards ===
Year	Award	Category	Result	Ref.
2014	Screen Actors Guild Award	Outstanding Performance by an Ensemble in a Drama Series	Nominated	
2015	Screen Actors Guild Award	Outstanding Performance by an Ensemble in a Drama Series	Nominated	
2015	Empire Awards	Empire Hero Award (Ensemble)	Won	
2016	Screen Actors Guild Award	Outstanding Performance by an Ensemble in a Drama Series	Nominated	
2017	Screen Actors Guild Award	Outstanding Performance by an Ensemble in a Drama Series	Nominated	
