= Lauren Valentine =

Fictional character from Hollyoaks

- Hollyoaks character
- Portrayed by: Dominique Jackson
- Duration: 2007–2010
- First appearance: 6 September 2007
- Last appearance: 13 August 2010
- Introduced by: Bryan Kirkwood
In-universe information
- Occupation: Student
- Father: Leo Valentine
- Mother: Valerie Holden
- Brothers: Danny Valentine
- Half-brothers: Calvin Valentine; Sonny Valentine
- Half-sisters: Sasha Valentine

Lauren Valentine is a fictional character from the British Channel 4 soap opera Hollyoaks, played by Dominique Jackson. First appearing in 2007, Lauren was written out of the show in 2010 along with the rest of the Valentine family as part of series producer Paul Marquess' overhaul of the series.

== Casting and creation ==
Jackson's casting was announced on 13 August 2007. She was created as an extension to the Valentine family and was created as part of a storyline which saw Leo Valentine reveal he had lived a double life.

On 8 March 2010 Jackson's axing was announced. Although it was initially reported Jackson was axed on screen brother Ricky Whittle confirmed she had planned to leave at the end of her contract which coincided with the ending of the rest of the Valentine's contracts who also chose not to renew. On leaving Jackson said that whenever she left would be "an upsetting time because I'd been there since I was 15. But, at the end of the day, times have to change and I'm only 18 and wasn't going to work at Hollyoaks forever. There are people I'm going to miss but it's the right time to do something else now."

== Characterisation ==
Jackson described the character as "a stroppy, misunderstood teenager" who she never wanted to "blossom her into a Hollyoaks babe". Jackson also said her character "probably not the nicest person". MSN described her as a "bad girl". Channel 4 described her as an "emo kid" who "always likes to make a statement." The Daily Star described her as a "troubled babe".

== Storylines ==
Lauren Valentine arrives in Hollyoaks village as the illegitimate daughter of Leo Valentine who first arrived in the village with her mother Valerie Holden and her brother Danny on 6 September 2007. Valerie leaves them at the Valentine residence and demands that Leo look after them while she sorts out her housing problems. Calvin & Sasha didn't know of Lauren and Danny, and until Lauren calls Leo "dad" they hadn't Leo had been leading a double-life. Lauren and Sasha initially don't get on but when Fletch tries to win Sasha back with a song he writes for her, Lauren helps Fletch improve it. Sasha later laughs at the song and kicks him out. When Valerie decided to stay in Greece, Lauren and Danny were set to join her. However the two decided to stay in Hollyoaks.

At the beginning of 2008, Valerie returns from Greece. Lauren wants nothing to do with her, but Valerie persuades Danny and Leo to give her another chance and let her stay in the Valentine house until she could get back on her feet. Tom is reported missing when he goes to return Newt's sketchbook and stays longer than planned. Lauren and Newt are later accused of kidnapping Tom. On Thursday 6 March 2008, Newt and Lauren decided to have sex. They both realize they aren't ready to have sex after Lauren suggests going to a graveyard to have sex like in Romeo & Juliet.

Lauren plots revenge against Elliot Bevan when she forgets to help them with their studies. Lauren overhears Elliot talking about his father, and along with a reluctant Newt, contactes him through an Internet message board and convinces him to meet them in the woods. Elliot expects to meet his father, and suffers a nervous breakdown when no one arrives. Elliot disappears for several days. They disvoer a body, only for the corpse to be identified as Sean Kennedy. When Elliot returns, Newt tells him what has happened, and Elliot forces them to tell their parents. Lauren's mum and brother leave Hollyoaks.

Lauren takes Newt's medication in order to understand how he feels. Newt and Anita go round to her house because Newt finds out Lauren tells Anita about his schizophrenia and finds her really ill. Anita calls an ambulance while Newt comforts her and tells her he loves her. Lauren is banned from seeing Newt and Newt tells her that he wants to end their relationship. Newt explains that Eli would be gone forever if Lauren burnt his belongings and that he and Lauren shall stay together in secret. On New Year's Eve 2008 Newt and Lauren slept with each other for the first time in Evissa. In January 2009, Newt and Lauren split up. Newt and Anite begin dating. Lauren begins claiming she is being bullied by Anita, who Newt ends his relationship with. Newt eventually finds out about her lies but they continue their friendship.

Ricky, Lauren, Theresa, Anita and Newt go on a camping trip. Wade joins them and he and Lauren go off alone into the woods. Newt discovers Wade's bag of women's clothes and panics, worrying about Lauren. He tells the others and accidentally calls Lauren his girlfriend. Lauren discovers Newt and Theresa's secret fling and slaps Newt across the face, before declaring that she is now going out with Wade. Lauren sleeps with Wade in Evissa, however he breaks up with her realising she was using him. Newt later tries to reconcile their relationship but Lauren declines because of the pain he had caused her. Lauren started a relationship with Gaz Bennett. Gaz and Lauren begin humiliating Anita for fun. Gaz and Lauren sleep together for the first time and Lauren realises that he was a virgin. The pair started to spend more and more time with Spencer Gray, a man with severe learning difficulties who had inherited a lot of money from Warren Fox. They used him to get him to buy alcohol for them and even swiped his credit card; they then hatched a plan to steal all of Spencer's money and run away together.

Lauren gets Spencer drunk and tells him they slept together. She lies to him that she is pregnant with his child and that he has to give her £2000 to have an abortion to con him out of his inheritance so that she and Gaz can run away together. However Spencer, in a state of panic, tells Sasha about the situation. When Calvin finds out after lodger Cheryl Brady eavesdrop the family argument, he grabs Gaz and throws him out, leading everyone to believe that Gaz is the father, when in fact Lauren's actually not pregnant at all. Calvin's friend arrests Gaz after an argument which Lauren blames Calvin for. Gaz is released and makes plans with Lauren to run away that day however their plans are cut short when Calvin is shot dead by Theresa. Lauren later lies to Sasha and Leo, telling them that she has had a miscarriage before running away with Gaz. Gaz is arrested for Calvin's murder and when he is later released he asks Lauren to run away with him again however she can't when she sees her dad needs her. Lauren and Gaz's relationship later deteriorates, she then starts to reconcile with Anita and accepts to go to Paris with her to visit her sister Leila Roy. Gaz is furious about this and gives Lauren an ultimatum to choose between him and Anita. Lauren then decides to choose Anita and they make a proper reconciliation and sh breaks up with Gaz. Lauren then later hears that Gaz has been arrested. She is then told by Anita that he held a gun, in which Lauren didn't believe and angrily thought she was lying. However she realises this when Gaz was actually arrested and goes to apologise to Anita. Lauren doubts that Gaz would actually shoot Anita with a real gun, but Anita convinces her that he probably would. Gaz is charged with Calvins murder Lauren believes him when he says he didn't but still wants nothing to do with him. Sasha finds out about the scam to fleece Spencer and argues with Lauren, during the argument Lauren falls down the stairs of the Loft. Lauren is hospitalised but discharges herself so she can go to Calvin's funeral. During the funeral Lauren shouts horrible things about Calvin then knocks his casket over. Valerie returns and reveals she wants to take Lauren back to Spain. Lauren visits Gaz in prison. He assumes that she cares about him, but she realises that she doesn't love Gaz anymore and leaves him. She then reveals to both Leo and Valerie that she wants to go to Spain with Valerie to reconnect with her. Out of guilt, Lauren then apologises to Spencer about her scheme and then is being forgiven by him. She later finds out that Valerie isn't going to Spain after all, but is then shocked to hear the rest of the family are joining them and that Spencer is going with them too. They attend the opening launch of the Chez Chez bar that replaces The Loft and they are cheered on as they leave the village.

== Reception ==
Grace Dent of The Guardian joked about one of Lauren's light hearted storylines which featured after tragic storylines stating: "cruel, skint January has been brightened with a lawnmower race featuring Gaz and Lauren astride killer-bladed mowers, larking about like people who'd clearly forgotten they were stalked habitually by bad luck and tragedy."
