= Becky and Barnaby Bear =

Children's TV Series

- Becky and Barnaby Bear logo
- Genre: Education; History; Healthy; Friendship
- Created by: Elaine Jackson; Darryl Worbey
- Developed by: Ron and Mary Borthwick
- Written by: Mellie Buse; Sally-Ann Lever; Jan Page; Robyn Charteris; Elaine Jackson
- Starring: Rebecca Nagan; Dominique Jackson
- Composer: Archie Brown
- Country of origin: United Kingdom
- Original language: English
- No. of episodes: 23

Production
- Executive producers: Sue Nott; Clare Elstow
- Camera setup: Tony Bragg; Alan Beal; Tim Jones (cameraman)
- Running time: 15 minutes

Original release
- Network: BBC Two; CBeebies
- Release: September 17, 2001 – 2005

Becky and Barnaby Bear is a live action television series on United Kingdom TV (CBeebies) for children between the ages of 0 and 5, starring Barnaby Bear and his friend Becky, who both live in the city of Chester. Barnaby Bear is a registered trademark of the Geographical Association. Barnaby helps children to learn about the world around them by showing a video diary of his adventures. The series was originally shown as a part of Watch, a BBC Schools series which aired from the 1960s to the early 2000s.

== Main characters ==
The two main characters are:-

- Barnaby Bear – Rebecca Nagan (credited as 'Puppeteer' only), with his mum and dad (who are normally offscreen and their faces are hidden).
- Becky – Dominique Jackson

A typical episode begins with Barnaby telling Becky about his latest adventure, which is illustrated by a video diary. In some episodes (e.g. Chester Zoo), Becky and Barnaby will visit the place together.

== Episodes ==
- Barnaby Bear to the Rescue – Barnaby climbs Moel Famau (a mountain in North Wales) with his father. During the trip Barnaby helps to save a girl who has fallen and injured her leg, using the knowledge he has been given by a park warden.
- Barnaby Bear's Edinburgh Diary – Barnaby and his mum visit Edinburgh and travel around the city sight-seeing.
- Barnaby on a Monster Hunt – Barnaby and Becky visit Loch Ness.
- Barnaby on a Steam Train – Barnaby and Becky travel Ffestiniog Steam Railway, where Barnaby loses his toy train, and Becky helps him find it.
- The River Thames – Barnaby spends the night camping on an island in the River Thames with his father. The next day he travels into London and visits the London Eye.
- Barnaby on the Farm – Barnaby and Becky stay on a farm in Wales where they help the farmer.
- The Legendary Trip – Becky and Barnaby Bear visit Caernarfon Castle, with Barnaby's father. Barnaby wants to pretend to be a king, with Becky as his Queen.
- Barnaby Bear and the Badgers – Barnaby goes badger watching in the New Forest.
- Fairy Footprints – Barnaby and Becky go on a ramble with Barnaby's father to Fairy Hill.
- Barnaby goes to Norway – Barnaby visits penpals in Skarsvag, and later travels with them to watch the Midnight sun at the North Cape.
- Barnaby Bear Goes to Dublin – Barnaby visits the city of Dublin in the Republic of Ireland. Since he is only going for a few days he flies rather than going by ferry. Once in Dublin he visits a number of the city's attractions. He finds that making a simple map helps him get around, and that there are many ways to travel around the city. He goes on a bus tour of the city, and goes on the DART. Finally he goes Irish dancing.
- Barnaby at the Seaside – Barnaby goes to Poole in Dorset. While there he learns about the various flags which are used to indicate sea conditions, and alerts the RNLI to a group of children who need help when their inflatable boat begins to drift away from the beach.
- Barnaby Bear Goes to Brittany – Barnaby visits Roscoff in Brittany.
- Becky's New Friends – Barnaby arranges to meet Becky at Chester Zoo, but Becky has forgotten and has gone to feed the penguins.
- Flying at The Fair – Barnaby and Becky visit Drayton Manor Theme Park. Before they arrive Barnaby tells Becky that he wants to go on the Ferris wheel ride ten times, however when he sees it he becomes frightened and puts it off by going on the merry-go-round. Becky keeps suggesting rides which are scary but instead Barnaby goes on a hoopla sideshow where Barnaby's mother wins a toy bear. Becky keeps a place for Barnaby on the flying elephant ride but Barnaby won't go on it. Becky tries to chivvy Barnaby onto the big wheel but instead he goes on a strongman sideshow, where he hits the attendant on the foot by accident with the hammer. Again Mrs. Bear wins a prize. Finally Barnaby admits to being scared of falling out of the big wheel, but after wishing he was a balloon he decides to go on the Big Wheel with Becky.
- Barnaby at the Aquarium – Barnaby and Becky visit the London Aquarium, where Barnaby lays a trail of clues for Becky's birthday.
- Barnaby Bear Finds out about the Environment – Barnaby Bear gets to grips with recycling, both at home and at the local recycling centre, where he finds out more about the three Rs – reduce, re-use, recycle! He also takes care of the environment when he helps his friends make a local park look lovely again. He hides the fact that he flew to Ireland instead of getting the ferry in one of his previous adventures.
- Barnaby Bear Finds out about Food – When the Cooking Bus comes to school, Barnaby and his friends get some extra help with their menu for the school picnic. On board, Barnaby finds out more about the food he eats and what's in it and how to make a vegetable kebab. Later he visits a local allotment to find out about growing fruit and vegetables.
- Barnaby Bear Finds out about Getting Active – Barnaby Bear learns about getting active during "Active Week" at school. He initially isn't keen on sports but tries various activities like walking, running, and playing football, inspired by Tanni Grey-Thompson's story. He discovers that being active doesn't have to be boring and can be incorporated into everyday life, like walking to school or playing in the playground.
- Barnaby Bear Goes to the Orkney Islands – Barnaby and his mum go to stay with friends who live on a farm on Papa Westray. He explores the farm and watches sheep shearing. He then goes on a tour of 'Papay', and finds out what it is like to live on a small island. He sees the ferry arrive with the island's food and fuel, gets to hold a lobster, looks for seals, and finds out what can be washed ashore as he helps clean up the beach.
- Tocuaro – A Mexican Village – Barnaby and his Mexican pen friend visit a Mexican village.
- Mexico City – Barnaby visits his penfriend in Mexico City to learn about the city's pollution.
- Barnaby Bear in Chester – Barnaby visits the Roman city of Chester. He goes to the Eastgate Street clock and looks at the pedestrian areas. He looks at the unusual shop designs in Chester, visiting the Tudor 'Rows'. Barnaby also goes to a cheese shop and has a taste. He listens to the town crier who explains his important job.
