= InStyle UK =

Defunct glossy fashion and celebrity monthly magazine

- Editor: Trish Halpin
- Frequency: Monthly
- Circulation: 146,507 (ABC Jul – Dec 2013); Print and digital editions.
- Founded: 2001
- Final issue: October 2016 (print)
- Company: Meredith Corporation
- Country: United Kingdom
- Language: English
- Website: InStyle

InStyle, published by IPC Media, was a monthly glossy magazine focusing on celebrities and their style. The British edition launched in 2001, following the success of the magazine in the US. The current editor is Trish Halpin, who commenced the position in September 2006. The circulation of In Style was currently more than 145,000 in 2013. In October 2016 the print version was cancelled and it became a web-only publication.

With the strapline "Your Own Personal Stylist", the magazine offers fashion and beauty tips to its readers. It also focuses on celebrity, with stars instead of models as subjects of the fashion and lifestyle shoots.

== Brand extension ==
In May 2007 In Style launched its website. The daily updated website publishes red carpet photos, A-list party features, editors' fashion and beauty picks, blogs written by the magazine team and behind-the-scenes videos of the magazine's celebrity photo shoots. On average, the site achieves 2 million page impressions a month and 240,000 unique users a month. The most searched for celebrities on the site are Jennifer Aniston, Sienna Miller, Victoria Beckham, Kate Moss, Mischa Barton, Nicole Richie, Lindsay Lohan, Jennifer Lopez, Cameron Diaz, Mary-Kate Olsen and Ashley Olsen.
