= Darren John Langford =

British actor (b. 1984)

- Born: 1 April 1984 (age 41); Fairburn, England, United Kingdom
- Occupation: Actor

Darren John Langford (born 1 April 1984) is a British actor who is best known for playing the mentally disabled character Spencer Gray in the long-running Channel 4 soap opera Hollyoaks. Langford left Hollyoaks in late 2010.

== Early life and education ==
Langford trained at the Arden School Of Theatre at UCEN Manchester and graduated in 2005.

== Career ==
Langford played Spencer Gray on the soap opera Hollyoaks from 2008 to 2010.

was the artistic director of Men In Dressing Gowns Theatre Company Ltd until the death of his Artistic partner and great friend Trevor Hancock in 2015.
