= Spencer Gray =

UK soap opera character, created 2008

- Hollyoaks character
- Portrayed by: Darren John Langford
- Duration: 2008–2010
- First appearance: 23 December 2008
- Last appearance: 13 August 2010
- Created by: Bryan Kirkwood
In-universe information
- Occupation: Club owner
- Brothers: Warren Fox (foster)
- Sisters: Katy Fox (foster)

Spencer Gray is a fictional character from the British Channel 4 soap opera Hollyoaks, played by Darren John Langford. The character first appeared on screen in December 2008. He initially appeared as the foster brother of Warren Fox, turning up after the death of his mother. He is noted for his learning disability and his having a condition which gave him a mental age of a human in preadolescence. The character was axed by Paul Marquess.

== Character creation ==
=== Background ===
The introduction of Spencer, a new on-screen relative of established character Warren Fox, was first announced in October 2008. The character was revealed to be Warren's former foster brother from his childhood and was introduced to explore Warren's past in more depth. It was made clear that Spencer would have learning disabilities and a mental age of a 10-year-old.

When the character made his first appearance on-screen, Warren and Spencer spoke of their troubled pasts and Spencer pleaded with Warren to look after him. Later on, Spencer was cared for by Warren's girlfriend, Sasha Valentine, and her family. Eventually, Spencer left the village with them when they departed.

=== Casting ===
Auditions were held for the part of Spencer with actor Darren John Langford going on to secure the role. The part was Langford's first major television role after appearing in television commercials and theatre roles prior to the casting. Langford also credited his early chemistry, with Jamie Lomas, during the audition process, as helping him settle into the role.

In early 2010, it was announced that Lucy Allan had stepped down from the position of executive producer and that Paul Marquess had taken over the role. It was soon revealed that Marquess planned to give Hollyoaks a "shake up", changing the production's team and beginning a cast cull by axing three established characters. Stephanie Waring (who plays Cindy Hutchinson) then revealed that all remaining cast members feared their character would be axed. One month later, Marquess announced his plans to axe a further 11 characters, including Spencer at the end of Langford's contract.

== Development ==
=== Personality and identity ===
In the soap opera, Spencer's personality is unique as, at times, it fits with his learning disabilities. He is portrayed as acting like a child, since he is mentally around ten years old. Fellow cast members have commented that he is shown to act in a manner that corresponds to those in their twenties, yet in a 'less adult way'.

=== Warren's "death" ===
During the soap opera, when his only relative in the series was killed off after Jamie Lomas quit the series, it was confirmed that Spencer would not be leaving. A transition in the character saw him being more independent as a character with his new-found responsibilities such as owning two businesses and a home. At the time of character Warren's funeral, Spencer was seen refusing to believe his death had taken place. This clearly showed Spencer's unwillingness to accept his death because he was easily manipulated by Ash Roy, who used his learning difficulties to his advantage. Of the scenes, Langford said: "He's focused on the fact that there's a coffin and Warren's inside it. He actually doesn't believe he's dead. He just starts banging on the coffin. The thought of Warren waking up alone in the dark is terrifying." After this point the character's behaviour became more erratic and lost control; he was sent into sheltered accommodation to be looked after. Following a brief hiatus from the series, he returned determined to be more independent. This was shown when he began to help with the reconstruction of The Loft, a big turning point in the character's direction.

== Storylines ==
=== 2008–2010 ===
The character Warren Fox found it hard to cope with him, but Spencer begged Warren not to hand him over to Social Services. Warren promised to look after him and told him he loved him as a brother. Warren asked him to become his best man at his wedding to Louise Summers. He became friends with Sasha Valentine who helped Warren look after him. Spencer went into Warren's car after he shouted at him, Warren then hit Spencer in public viewing. Spencer later began walking the village where Theresa McQueen, Anita Roy and Lauren Valentine got him to buy alcohol. Warren was later accused of murder and began losing his temper even more, Spencer then stood up to him telling him to leave Sasha alone. This resulted in Warren hitting Spencer again. At this point, Spencer left home and asked Sasha to leave, however, she could not as she loved him. Warren later regretted it and asked Spencer to forgive him. Calvin met Spencer and offered him to stay at his house. After Warren's death, Spencer regretted leaving home and admitted to Carmel that he loved him.

In episodes after Warren's solicitor informed Spencer that Warren had left The Loft, Evissa and his flat to him in his will. Spencer was fooled into selling The Loft to Ash Roy after he tricked Spencer into believing that Warren was still alive and that he wanted Spencer to sell The Loft. On the day of Warren's funeral, Spencer initially refused to go because of bad memories from his mother's funeral, he later was convinced to go and during the service, Spencer had a dramatic 'episode' and banged on the coffin begging him to wake up. Ash was found out and the deed was shredded. Calvin began struggling to cope with Spencer and his unruly behaviour. Realising he could not go on, Calvin organised Spencer to be put into a home however when Sasha returned from visiting her brother she offered Spencer a room back at the Valentines', which he declined saying he liked where he lived now.

In late 2009, after a brief hiatus, Spencer became friends with students India Longford and Dave Colburn. Dave used Spencer by getting free drinks from him when Calvin caught him out they argued about how Calvin too uses Spencer for his business, which resulted in Calvin punching Dave. Meanwhile, Spencer developed a crush on India but when she turned him down Spencer picked up a live firework which burnt his hand.

In March 2010 Spencer was revealed to be the person who was looking after Holly Hutchinson after she ran away from home. When he sees Jake Dean being pulled away by the police, Spencer feels guilty, so he confides in Calvin on what he should do. Calvin says that he shouldn't confess to the police about the situation or else he will get into trouble.

When Calvin is interviewed about his involvement in Warren's death, he lets slip about Spencer's involvement in Holly's disappearance. This then leads to Spencer being interrogated by the police at the station, where his inability to defend himself worsens however all charges are dropped.

Spencer makes a close friendship with Lauren Valentine and Gaz Bennett however they are using him for his money. Lauren gets Spencer drunk and then makes him believe they slept together. However, she lies to him that she's pregnant with his child and that he has to give her £2000 to have a termination, while she's actually trying to con him out of his inheritance with Gaz so that she can run away with him. Spencer panics and tells Sasha about the situation and she believes Gaz is the father, meaning that Spencer didn't explain the whole story about him and Lauren. Although everyone believes that Gaz got Lauren pregnant, they are not aware she is not pregnant at all, however, Gaz and Lauren have no choice but to continue with their plan.

Spencer breaks up his friendship and falls out with Calvin after he discovers that Calvin left Warren to die in the fire and didn't help him.

A few weeks later, Calvin is shot dead by Theresa McQueen, which devastated Spencer as he had always looked to Calvin as a big brother. Three months later, the Valentines decided to make a fresh start out of Hollyoaks and so decided to take Spencer with them. They left on 13 August 2010.

In October 2010 Warren returned to Hollyoaks after being dead for the last year and it has been told that Spencer has been told but has not returned to see him. Nine years later, it was revealed that Warren had been staying with him along with his twins Sophie and Sebastian, so that the twins' mother Sienna would not find them.

== Reception ==
Kris Green of media reporting website Digital Spy spoke of his admiration for the character when he praised actor Langford for his portrayal and his chemistry with Jamie Lomas (Warren), saying: "Spencer is a fascinating character - a character whom you can't take your eyes off when he's on screen. Langford has the part down to a tee and they certainly have the chemistry between them just right." He also praised episodes the character appeared in as "unmissable". Fellow cast member Nathalie Emmanuel, who plays Sasha Valentine in the series, has spoken about how Langford captured the character of Spencer amazingly in the way that he's not made out to be 'childlike', stating: "Even though Spencer has the mental age of a child, he still comes across like a 24-year-old guy."

In 2009 Ruth Deller of entertainment website Lowculture who runs a monthly feature of the most popular and unpopular soap opera characters, profiled Spencer, calling him an irritating character, also stating: "So good he doesn’t have a surname, with some sort of learning difficulty that’s also as-yet unnamed, Spencer’s only purpose seems to be to make Warren sympathetic. [...] Hollyoaks has questionable morality at the best of times, and we’d maybe forgive them the addition of Spencer if he was a well-acted likeable character with a specific difficulty that was portrayed accurately. But instead, it’s just a case of epic fail all round."
