= Dominique Jackson (British actress) =

British actress (born 1991)

- Born: Dominique Hannah Jackson; 3 December 1991 (age 34); Oldham, Greater Manchester, England
- Occupation: Actress
- Years active: 1999–present
- Children: 1

Dominique Hannah Jackson (born 3 December 1991) is a British actress, known for playing Lauren Valentine in the Channel 4 soap opera Hollyoaks.

== Early life ==
She attended the Radclyffe School in Chadderton and left with 9 GCSEs (8 A* - C).

== Career ==
Her first major role was as Saffron in the BAFTA winning and heart-warming TV drama Buried Treasure with British actor John Thaw. Jackson also starred alongside Paul O'Grady as "Molly" in the 1998 West End production of Annie at the Victoria Palace.

Jackson went on to be known for her role as Becky in the children's TV series Becky and Barnaby Bear and throughout her childhood other credits include The Hitchhiker's Guide to the Galaxy, Casualty, Doctors, UGetMe, Welcome to Orty Fou, Conviction Little Britain. In 2003 she appeared as Joanna Sharpe in The Bill, and has since appeared as Roseanne Speedwell on The New Worst Witch in 2005 and as Selena on the hit children's TV show My Parents Are Aliens in 2006. Dominique was cast as Lauren Valentine on Channel 4 soap, Hollyoaks. Next, she played Evie Prior in Waterloo Road. She then appeared in Episode One of The Body Farm as Natasha Collins.

In 2013, she was cast as the role of Vee in the ITV drama based on the novel by Dorothy Koomson, The Ice Cream Girls, which was shot in Ireland. Later that year Jackson played Morgan McDonald in the Jimmy McGovern series Moving On. Jackson appeared in Holby City as Chelsey Corman for two episodes.

She played The Mayfly in Martin Baltscheit's Only A Day at The Belgrade Theatre, Coventry. Then in March 2021, she appeared in an episode of the BBC soap opera Doctors as Sophie Herron. More recently, Jackson appeared in 'Berlin Berlin' dance live shows in Germany.
