= David Judge (actor) =

British actor (active 2006–2011)

- Born: David Robert Judge; Manchester, England
- Occupation: Actor
- Years active: 2006–2023

David Robert Judge is an English actor who is best known for his role in Hollyoaks as Danny Valentine. He also played Jordan Ryder in ITV police drama The Bill.

== Filmography ==
- Hollyoaks
- Doctors
- Casualty
- The Bill
- Holby City
- Weekender
- Screw
