= Nathalie Emmanuel =

English actress (born 1989)

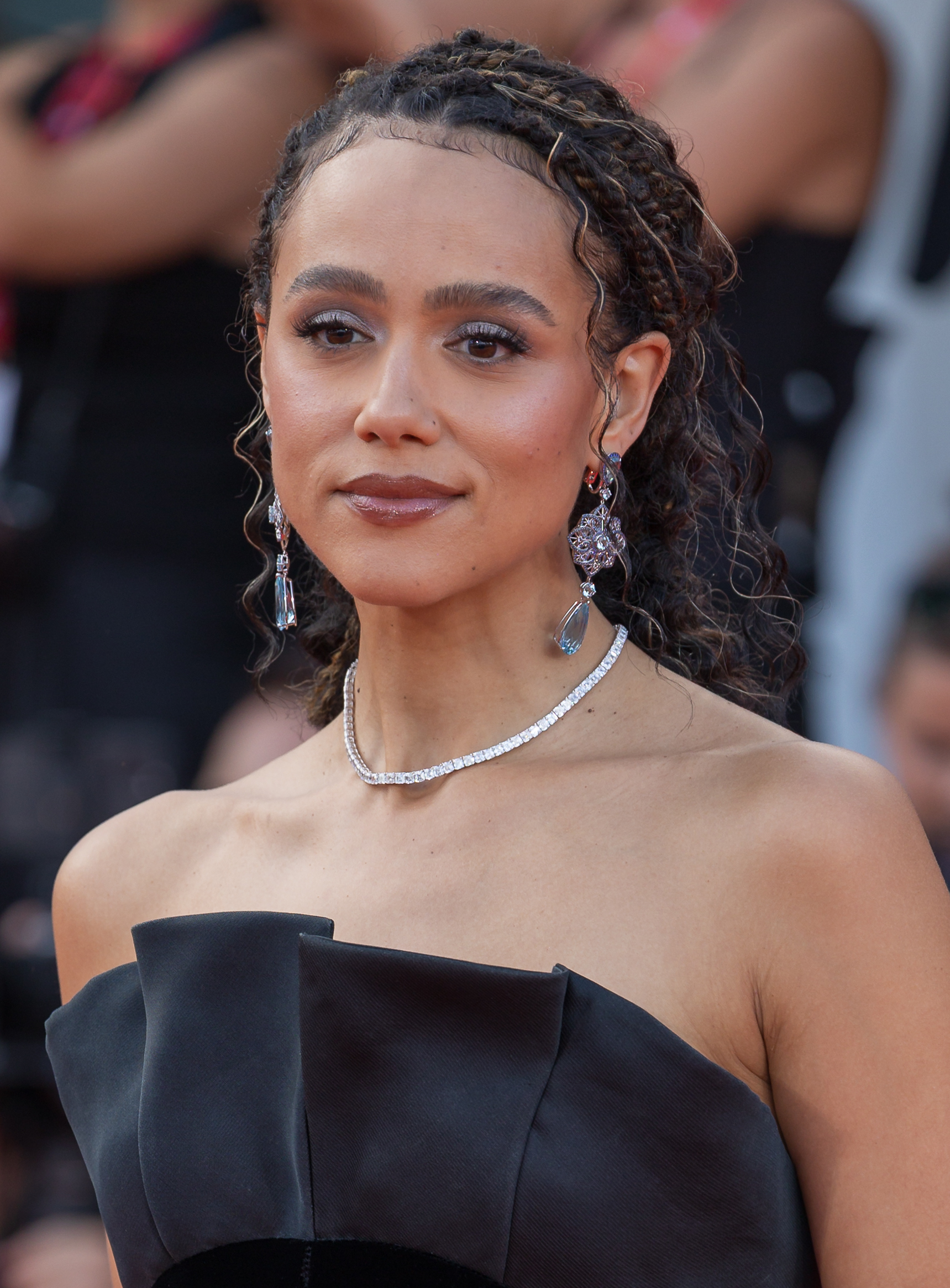
- Emmanuel at the 2025 Venice Film Festival
- Born: Nathalie Joanne Emmanuel; 2 March 1989 (age 37); Southend-on-Sea, Essex, England
- Occupation: Actress
- Years active: 2006–present

Nathalie Joanne Emmanuel (born 2 March 1989) is an English actress. Emmanuel began her acting career appearing in theatre in the late 1990s, acquiring roles in various West End productions such as the musical The Lion King. In 2006, she began her on-screen career by starring as Sasha Valentine in soap opera Hollyoaks, after which she appeared in various British television series until her debut film appearance in Twenty8k (2012).

Emmanuel gained wider recognition for her role as Missandei in the HBO fantasy series Game of Thrones (2013–2019), and continued her career with supporting roles in the Maze Runner films (2015–2018), the Fast & Furious films Furious 7 (2015), The Fate of the Furious (2017), F9 (2021), and Fast X (2023). She has since taken on lead roles in Army of Thieves (2021) and Megalopolis (2024).

== Early life ==
Emmanuel was born on 2 March 1989 in Southend-on-Sea, Essex, England. Her mother is Dominican, and her father is of half-Saint Lucian and half English descent. She has an older sister. Emmanuel recalled that her mother first took notice of her passion and desire to become an actress during Emmanuel's attendance at the private St Hilda's School, which closed in 2014, and later the Westcliff High School for Girls grammar school. In an interview with the New York Daily News, she commented, "When I was 3, [I'd] always cause drama that my mum decided maybe I should channel it properly—so she started me on acting, singing and dancing classes". At the age of 10, she played Young Nala in the West End production of the musical The Lion King.

== Career ==
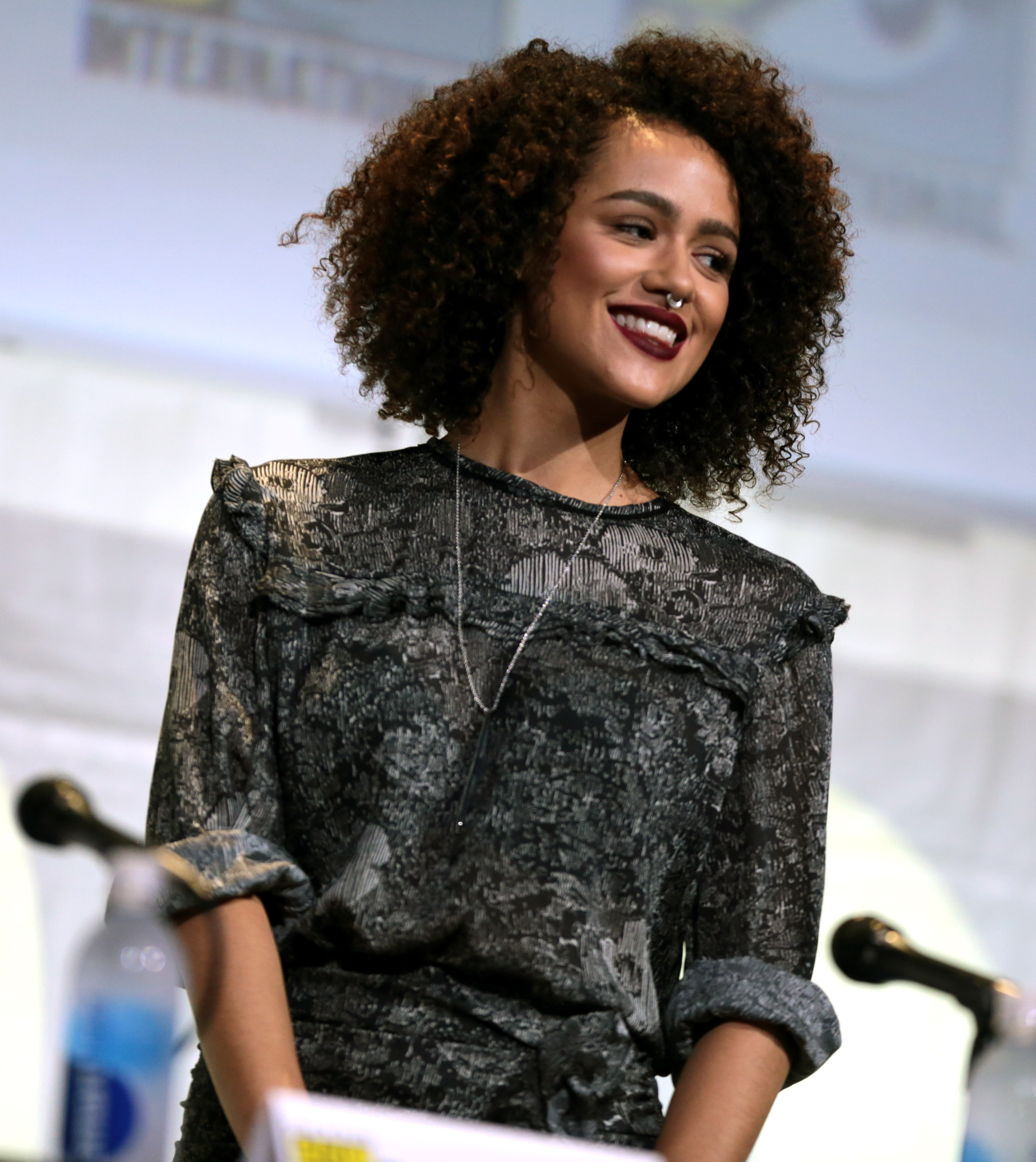
Emmanuel speaking at the 2016 San Diego Comic-Con

In 2006, she made her television debut, starring as Sasha Valentine in the soap opera Hollyoaks. Emmanuel appeared on the show until 2010; her character's storylines included prostitution, and heroin addiction.

In January 2012, Emmanuel presented BBC Three's Websex: What's the Harm?, investigating the online sexual habits of 16–24 year olds in the UK. Later in the same year she made her film debut in the thriller Twenty8k.

The following year, she was cast as Missandei, Daenerys Targaryen's interpreter, in HBO's fantasy drama series Game of Thrones. In an interview with Jimmy Kimmel, she confirmed that she received the news about winning the role when she was working in a clothes store as a shop assistant. In 2015, Emmanuel was promoted to a regular cast member on the show. Missandei was the only prominent character that was a woman of colour in the show, and her death scene, which took place whilst she was in chains, was unpopular among fans, being called an example of fridging and evoking an image of slavery. Emmanuel later told The Guardian:

The reaction to Missandei's death was so big because she was the only one. I think a lot of the people who felt othered or disenfranchised had connected with her, or felt represented by her, especially women of colour. When she died – and in the way that she did – it was so painful for people because they were like, ‘Wait, no! That's how they’re going to do the only woman of colour?’

Also in 2015, she played computer hacker Ramsey in the action film Furious 7, and Harriet in the science fiction adventure Maze Runner: The Scorch Trials. For the former Emmanuel won the Screen Nation award for Best Female Performance in Film. She played Harriet once again in the movie Maze Runner: The Death Cure in 2018. In 2017, Emmanuel said that she learnt "the art of subtlety" playing Missandei, and that as she was working on soundstages and with greenscreens when playing Ramsey, that role developed the use of her imagination when acting. She reprised her role of Ramsey in The Fate of the Furious in 2017; she played Ramsey again in F9, which was due to be released in May 2020, but was postponed until June 2021 due to the COVID-19 pandemic.

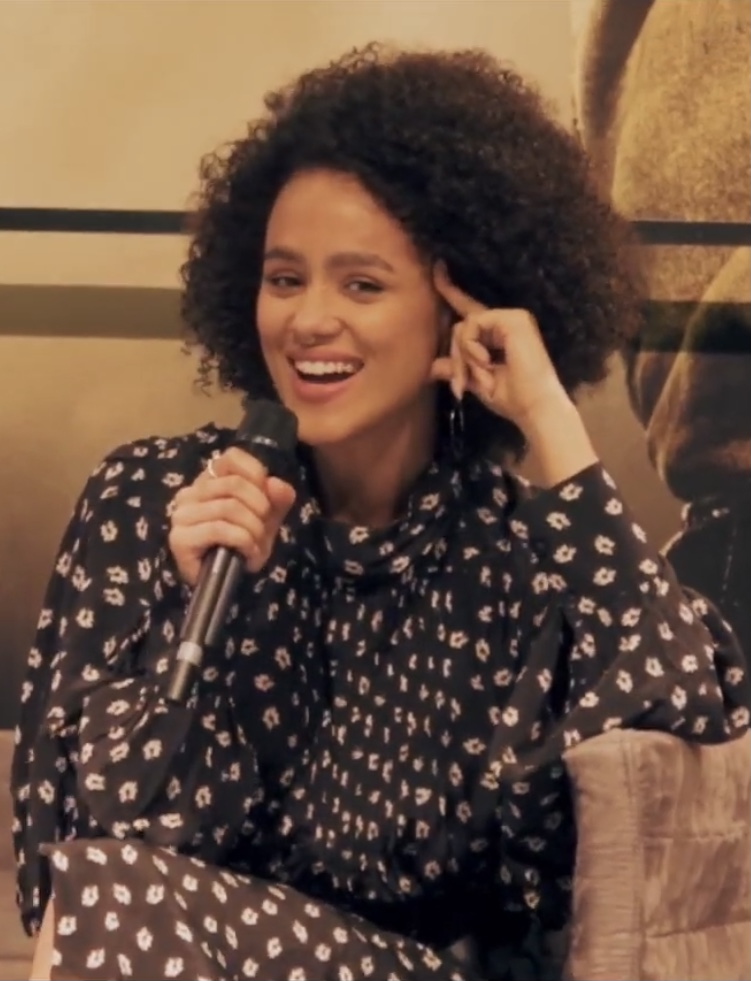
Emmanuel at the 2019 German Comic Con in Dortmund

Emmanuel played Maya, a political speechwriter, in the romantic comedy television series Four Weddings and a Funeral for Hulu, and was the voice of Deet in The Dark Crystal: Age of Resistance Netflix series, both released in 2019. In July the following year, Emmanuel costarred opposite Kevin Hart and John Travolta in the Quibi original action-comedy series Die Hart. In May 2022, Emmanuel joined the cast of Francis Ford Coppola's film, Megalopolis. The same year, she starred alongside Thomas Doherty in the supernatural horror film The Invitation.

== In the media ==
FHM ranked Emmanuel as 99th in their 100 Sexiest Women of 2013, and 75th in their Sexiest Women of 2015. In 2015, she also appeared in the April issue of InStyle and GQ.

== Personal life ==
Emmanuel follows a plant-based diet for health reasons, and told Glamour in 2017 that "I don't trust the food industry, I don't trust what they put in our belly – it makes me feel sick actually."

== Filmography ==
=== Film ===
Year	Title	Role	Notes	Ref.
2012	Twenty8k	Carla		
2015	Maze Runner: The Scorch Trials	Harriet		
2015	Furious 7	Ramsey		
2017	The Fate of the Furious	Ramsey		
2018	Maze Runner: The Death Cure	Harriet		
2018	The Titan	Warrant Officer Tally Rutherford		
2020	Holly Slept Over	Holly		
2021	F9	Ramsey		
2021	Army of Thieves	Gwendoline Starr		
2021	Last Train to Christmas	Sue Taylor		
2022	The Invitation	Evelyn "Evie" Jackson		
2023	Fast X	Ramsey		
2024	Arthur the King	Olivia		
2024	Megalopolis	Julia Cicero		
2024	The Killer	Zee		
2026	Confinement	Grieving Widow		

=== Television ===
Year(s)	Title	Role	Notes	Ref.
2006–2010	Hollyoaks	Sasha Valentine	191 episodes	
2008	Hollyoaks Later	Sasha Valentine	Series 1 (4 episodes)	
2009	Hollyoaks: The Morning After the Night Before	Sasha Valentine		
2011	Casualty	Cheryl Hallows	Episode: "Only Human"	
2011	Misfits	Charlie	Episode 3.1	
2011	Scream if You Know the Answer!	Herself	Series 1, episode 9	
2012	Websex: What's the Harm?	Herself	Presenter	
2013–2019	Game of Thrones	Missandei	Seasons 3–4: recurring (15 episodes); Seasons 5–8: main role (23 episodes)	
2019	Four Weddings and a Funeral	Maya Jones	Miniseries	
2019	The Dark Crystal: Age of Resistance	Deet (voice)	Main role	
2020–present	Die Hart	Jordan King	Main role	

=== Radio ===
Year	Title	Role	Notes	Ref.
2018	Love Henry James: The Golden Bowl	Charlotte Stant		
2025	Ed Sheeran: A Little More	Rupert Grint's love interest		

== Awards and nominations ==
Year	Award	Category	Work	Result	Ref.
2013	Screen Actors Guild Award	Outstanding Performance by an Ensemble in a Drama Series	Game of Thrones	Nominated	
2014	Screen Actors Guild Award	Outstanding Performance by an Ensemble in a Drama Series	Game of Thrones	Nominated	
2015	Screen Actors Guild Award	Outstanding Performance by an Ensemble in a Drama Series	Game of Thrones	Nominated	
2015	Empire Awards	Empire Hero Award (shared with the cast)	Game of Thrones	Won	
2016	Screen Actors Guild Award	Outstanding Performance by an Ensemble in a Drama Series	Game of Thrones	Nominated	
2017	Screen Actors Guild Award	Outstanding Performance by an Ensemble in a Drama Series	Game of Thrones	Nominated	
2019	Screen Actors Guild Award	Outstanding Performance by an Ensemble in a Drama Series	Game of Thrones	Nominated	
2021	Primetime Emmy Awards	Outstanding Actress in a Short Form Comedy or Drama Series	Die Hart	Nominated	
2023	Primetime Emmy Awards	Outstanding Actress in a Short Form Comedy or Drama Series	Die Hart 2: Die Harter	Nominated	
2024	NAACP Image Awards	Outstanding Performance in a Short Form Series	Die Hart	Nominated	
