= Kathy Barnes =

UK soap opera character, created 2005

- Hollyoaks character
- Sarah Jane Buckley as Kathy Barnes (2007)
- Portrayed by: Sarah Jane Buckley
- Duration: 2005–2008, 2017
- First appearance: 6 October 2005
- Last appearance: 8 September 2017
- Introduced by: David Hanson (2005); Bryan Kirkwood (2017)
In-universe information
- Occupation: Physical education teacher
- Husband: Mike Barnes (until 2008)
- Daughters: Sarah Barnes; Amy Barnes
- Grandsons: Lucas Hay
- Granddaughters: Leah Barnes

Kathy Barnes is a fictional character from the British Channel 4 soap opera Hollyoaks, played by Sarah Jane Buckley. Kathy arrived in October 2005. In October 2007, it was announced that Kathy had been written out of the serial and would leave in January 2008. She returned briefly on 24 April 2017 for the funeral of her daughter Amy Barnes (Ashley Slanina-Davies) and departed the following day on 25 April 2017. Kathy returned on 4 September 2017 for Ste Hay's (Kieron Richardson) week-long trial. After being found not guilty on 8 September 2017, Ste was shot by Kathy, following which Kathy is taken into police custody and makes a permanent exit.

== Character creation ==
Actress Sarah Jane Buckley auditioned for the role of Kathy, and went on to secure the role. Buckley was originally signed to an eighteen-month contract, but stayed on after. In 2007, however, it was announced that the character would leave after only two years. Speaking entertainment and media website Digital Spy about Buckley's impending departure, series producer Bryan Kirkwood said: "Sarah Jane Buckley will also be leaving the show in the coming months. There's a lot happening in with the Barmy Barnes and it's really exciting to give them ever-increasing bonkers storylines. So Kathy will be leaving in a bit of a bonkers story at the beginning of next year, too." A Channel 4 spokesperson added: "Kathy's departure knocks Mike for six, but it's not long before he strikes up a relationship with one of the younger birds in the village."

In 2009, Buckley admitted she would like to see her character return. Speaking to Holy Soap, Buckley explained: "I suggested, and I haven't heard anything back yet, that I should come back, demand to have the babies from Amy and have a young toyboy, which would throw Mike Barnes into a right tizz. I think it would be an amazing storyline for her to come back and cause loads of trouble in the village with this younger man." She continued: "I wish they'd bring [Kathy] back. I had so much more to go with her. I was sad to leave. I didn't want to leave at all. I loved doing the show." When asked whether she thought viewers would be happy to see the character, Buckley said: "I always thought they'd say, 'We're glad you're gone'. But people say they wish she was there because she was that kind of antagonistic element you need sometimes in a soap. Get the campaign going! Get Kathy back. I'd go back tomorrow."

== Storylines ==
=== Backstory ===
Kathy met Mike Barnes (Tony Hirst) at a young age and fell in love. Kathy discovered she was pregnant with Sarah (Loui Batley). She and Mike pondered whether to put Sarah up for adoption, but decided to keep her. The pair then married. Kathy was born in 1973; however, in 2006, she celebrated her 40th birthday. This was due to SORAS.

=== 2005–2008 ===
Kathy is introduced shortly after her daughter, Sarah. Kathy is strictly training Sarah for numerous swimming contests and a future career in the sport. Sarah feels suffocated by Kathy's pressure and finds support in the form of boyfriend Rhys Ashworth (Andrew Moss). Mike and their youngest daughter Amy (Ashley Slanina-Davies) then arrive. Kathy sees Rhys as a threat to her hope of Sarah becoming a swimmer. Kathy then sleeps with Rhys and blackmails him into breaking up with her. During a massive row over Sarah and Rhys getting back together at Mike and Kathy's anniversary party, Gilly Roach (Anthony Quinlan) inadvertently shouts out that Rhys and Kathy slept together, in front of Sarah, Amy and Mike. Sarah is hurt and disgusted with Rhys and Kathy, while Amy is left shocked and distressed by the revelation. Mike is furious. Backed up by Amy and Sarah, he orders Kathy to leave, which she does. Kathy returns and gets back together with Mike after the two decide to reconcile for the sake of their daughters. Amy gives birth to Leah Barnes (Ela-May Demircan) and Kathy feels ashamed. To cover it up, Kathy decides to raise Leah as her own. Kathy leaves to stay with her mother for a short while. In this time, Amy bonds with Leah and declares she wants to raise Leah, she also tells everyone she is Leah's real mother. Kathy realises she will lose Leah and kidnaps her. Eventually Leah is returned to Amy as Kathy moves to her mother's to recover from trauma.

Kathy returns in October 2007, and finds Ste Hay (Kieron Richardson) living with Amy. Kathy and Mike are not happy and throw Ste out. Amy then leaves with Leah and moves in with Ste. Kathy phones the social services which excludes her from her daughter even more. Kathy discovers Sarah and Rhys are back together. Their relationship leads to the start of Kathy's vendetta against the Ashworth family. The family begins getting strange phone calls, vandalism on their house and even a Tupperware box full of faeces. The Ashworths begin to accuse several people including Ste and even own family members Hannah Ashworth (Emma Rigby) and Beth Clement (Sinéad Moynihan). Whilst throwing a brick through the window of the Ashworth family business, Drive 'n' Buy, Kathy loses a nail. She goes to Evissa for a manicure and tells Carmel Valentine (Gemma Merna) that she took the nail off after it became loose. Carmel turns detective and finds a broken nail outside Drive 'n' Buy. She then reveals Kathy as the vandal. Kathy, Mike, Sarah, Amy and Ste are confronted by Rhys, Hannah, Beth. Suzanne (Suzanne Hall), Neville (Jim Millea), and Josh (Sonny Flood). Kathy also gets jealous of Zoe Carpenter (Zoë Lister) and falsely accuses her and Mike of cheating. Although he had always previously supported Kathy throughout all of her various issues while at Hollyoaks, this accusation, coupled with Kathy's vendetta against the Ashworths, finally proves to be the last straw for Mike. Unable to cope with Kathy's behaviour any longer Mike tells her to leave. When she refuses, Mike throws her out, and Kathy goes to stay with her mother. In January 2008 Mike subsequently files for a divorce.

In October 2009, Sarah dies during a parachute jump. Mike phones Kathy to tell her the bad news. However, she does not attend Sarah's funeral.

=== 2017 ===
In March 2017, Kathy is mentioned as getting on the wrong train travelling to daughter Amy's wedding subsequently missing the ceremony. She returns to Hollyoaks in April 2017 for Amy's funeral, after she is murdered. Kathy and Mike have an argument over allowing Zoe to come for Amy's funeral.

She later returned in September for Ste's trail for Amy's murder. After catching Ryan kissing Tegan Lomax (Jessica Ellis) and decides to take Leah & Lucas away from her. She takes them to the beach where she unearths Shane Sweeney's (Michael Salami) handgun; Shane had been reported missing a couple of weeks earlier. Instead of calling the police, Kathy decides to keep the gun for herself.

The following day, Ste is found not guilty of Amy's murder, with Kathy running off in tears. Having watching Ste being released, Kathy decides to shoot him in the courtroom. Ste survives the shooting with no internal injuries. Kathy is last seen being escorted to the police station, under arrest for attempted murder.
