= Gilly Roach =

Fictional character from Hollyoaks

- Hollyoaks character
- Portrayed by: Anthony Quinlan
- Duration: 2005–2011
- First appearance: 6 October 2005
- Last appearance: 22 November 2011
- Introduced by: David Hanson
- Spin-off appearances: Hollyoaks: The Morning After The Night Before
In-universe information
- Occupation: Barman; Shop assistant Personal trainer
- Wife: Steph Cunningham (2010)

Gilly Roach is a fictional character from the British Channel 4 soap opera Hollyoaks, played by Anthony Quinlan. The character first appeared on-screen during the episode broadcast on 6 October 2005. Gilly was created in 2005 by executive producer David Hanson. Gilly has often been portrayed as a push-over and has a double act partnership with fellow character Rhys Ashworth. His main character traits have been his "nice attitude", with Quinlan branding Gilly in his first five years as a "push-over". He has been labelled a loser and unlucky in love after failed relationships with Jessica Harris (Jennifer Biddall), Beth Clement (Sinéad Moynihan), Cheryl Brady (Bronagh Waugh) and Jem Costello (Helen Russell-Clark). In 2009, executive producer Lucy Alan made changes to the character and reached a mutual agreement with Quinlan to shave off his hair, which has characterised Gilly during his early years.

In 2010, he was paired with Steph Cunningham (Carley Stenson), who was later killed off after Stenson left her role. This resulted in a long-running storyline for Gilly in which he was seen taking a "dark journey" unable to cope with grief. Another big storyline for the character occurs in 2011 when Jacqui McQueen (Claire Cooper) accuses him of rape; the storyline subsequently received media attention. A fictional jury consisting of viewers is to decide if he is guilty or innocent. Other storylines have involved the effects of binge drinking, which was portrayed during an online spin-off drama. Gilly has sometimes proved unpopular with television critics, with one branding him a "dampy drizzle of a character". Quinlan has also been nominated for minor awards for his portrayal. In 2011, it was announced that Quinlan would be leaving the serial to pursue other projects and would leave at the end of the rape storyline.

== Character development ==
=== Relationship with Beth Clement ===
BBC America described Gilly on its official website, staying, "His most endearing quality is his honesty and despite his countless flaws, what you see is what you get. He's hardly a ladykiller but what he lacks in appearance he makes up for with charisma." E4 publicity describe Gilly as fun-loving and always trying to woo females but hardly manages to impress them and has also been described as unlucky-in-love after his failed relationships. Initially he failed to impress females and didn't have much in common with them. Gilly has been portrayed as a strong supporter of Manchester City F.C., it was this single thing that drew him and Beth Clement (Sinéad Moynihan) together. Gilly was later made a fool by Beth and his best friend Rhys Ashworth (Andrew Moss) after they continued an affair despite the fact they were siblings, they split, Beth subsequently died and due to Gilly's forgiving personality he later forgave Rhys. Holy Soap opined that this was a stand out moment of the character's duration. Another storyline showing his timid personality was when he was mugged by a group of teenagers and was left fearing for his safety and even let them pick on him on the streets. In a further twist Gilly was left feeling so ashamed of the attack he pretended it was adult attackers fearing what people would think of him.

=== Binge drinking ===
In a spin-off series titled Hollyoaks: The Morning After The Night Before, Gilly and Josh Ashworth go to Manchester. The series explored the dangers of bringe drinking and was funded by the Home Office. This was the start of changes implemented to the character that would continue into the main series. During the spin-off he was portrayed having negative experiences with excessive alcohol consumption, of this Quinlan said, "Gilly and Josh had a little fight over Ruby (Danika McGuigan), so the character did change due to all the drink consumed. His mood changed further when he attempted to run after Josh after the scuffle, and fell down a set of stairs in the nightclub, losing some of his teeth. After the incident he couldn't wait to get back home to the village." He then said that he wanted viewers to learn from his character's scenario and be responsible while drinking, saying, "It will make people think twice about binge drinking and make people aware of the consequences if you do."

When the character lost his teeth it made the character's low confidence worsen. Quinlan comment on this saying, "Gilly's confidence was always low really - self-confidence, self-belief. But having no teeth isn't good to look at - not a good look. It's going to draw attention to him and not do him any favours." To enable continuity the character was scripted a slight speech impediment and behind the scenes Quinlan had a special palette fitted. It was a real one fitted by dentists and paid for by the show which blacked the character's front teeth and left a chipped one at the side. Quinlan said that it was quite difficult to speak when wearing it, but praised it as being realistic to have some form of speech impediment having teeth knocked out. Talking of his character's changes and lessons learnt during the special episodes Quinlan said, "I think Gilly's learnt to chill out a little, not to follow the crowd and be a sheep. Everyone was drinking loads, he got caught up in it and he came out on the wrong side of it. So, I think there is a lesson learned there - Gilly will do his own thing and not drink as much."

=== Relationship with Steph Cunningham ===
Gilly was later seen using his new look in attempt to get the affections of Steph Cunningham (Carley Stenson). After failing he acted out of character and struck up a scam date with Cheryl Brady (Bronagh Waugh) to make Steph jealous but it back-fired when his false tooth came loose in Cheryl's mouth. He later has relationships with Cheryl and Jem Costello (Helen Russell-Clark). Another change implemented during this period was a dramatic change to the character's appearance after new series producer Lucy Allan and Quinlan came to a mutual decision to transform his hairstyle by shaving it all off, a stark contrast as during his early years he was constantly seen with long hair.

After Gilly eventually starts a relationship with Steph, she is diagnosed with cervical cancer and initially keeps the news a secret from him. Stenson said of Steph's reasoning, "With Gilly, she's embarrassed and doesn't want him to look after her." Speaking of the storyline Quinlan said during an interview with Inside Soap, "I think Gilly's really gutted that he didn't get together with Steph sooner - he wasted so much time with Cheryl and Jem, when really he was in love with her." At one point, Steph cancels her wedding to Gilly because he cannot accept she is dying. Of this Quinlan said, "His denial is not helping her. She's tying to take this in her stride and wants to spend quality time with the people she loves before she goes. She tells him he has to accept she's going to die or the wedding is off. and she hands back her engagement ring." Quinlan has also said that he was eager for the pair to marry because of the "tear jerking" scenes it would create. Steph was killed off during a special week of episodes dubbed "fire week". The cast filmed many stunts themselves, and Quinlan filmed scenes in front of a burning set, and said that he "was very manly about it" whilst filming a ladder rescue scene. Gilly's immediate grief resulted in the characters name trending on Twitter, about which Quinlan said, "So glad that the ep had the impact that was desired! Buzzing Gilly is trended again!" Gilly's grief is made worse because of Steph deciding to die prematurely. Quinlan said, "He's grieving - he just can't understand why she took her life like that." He added that Gilly's grief turns to anger because he cannot get the answers to his questions. Quinlan wanted Gilly to take a different route, saying, "I'd like to see Gilly go down a bit of a different route because he’s been a bit of a push-over in the past. I'd like to see his character progress a bit more and I'd like to see a side of him that we haven't seen before." Gilly's grief continued to worsen with Quinlan adding, "The poor guy's heading off on a very dark journey that I'm sure he'll live to regret." As Gilly is still so angry, at Steph's funeral, the director of the episode asked Quinlan not to cry at all during the ceremony. Quinlan added, "It was all so heartfelt, though, that I broke down for real a few times - and I think that's going to come across in the final episode."

=== Sexual assault ===
Gilly later finds himself attracted to Lynsey Nolan (Karen Hassan). He initially fears he is moving on to soon. While interviewed by Inside Soap, Quinlan described the scenes in which they share their first kiss saying, "Gilly gets a new job at Look Sharpe as a personal trainer, and invites Lynsey for a free session, Lynsey's looking pretty good when she turns up, so Gilly gets a bit sweaty and hot under the collar - and she ends up hopping into the tub and dragging Gilly in fully clothed!" They later meet up and feel awkward because of Gilly's grief for Steph. Of this, Quinlan said, "They're getting on well, but as soon as the word date is mentioned, it goes a bit wrong, nerves get the better of them and they have a huge row." Off-screen, Quinlan was not happy with the fact Gilly was trying to move on quickly, saying, "I thought it was a bit harsh, it feels like it's a little too soon, doesn't it? We'll just have to wait and see what the future holds for Gilly and Lynsey - but there's no comparison to Steph..."

In December 2010, Channel 4 released a press statement that Jacqui McQueen (Claire Cooper) would cheat on Rhys with Gilly and that the night's events would "change their lives forever". It was later announced that the storyline would see Jacqui accusing Gilly of raping her. The storyline received much coverage in various tabloid newspapers who also branded it as a "shock plot" for the serial. None of the cast members involved in the storyline knew if Jacqui had actually been raped. Cooper said, "They're telling the same story but are looking at it from different angles. Just who to believe is a very grey area. It will split the village and the viewers. We don't know what happened that night. We've just been told that our characters each think they're telling the truth. [Anthony] and I have talked about it a lot. I even read his scripts to try to work it out. The outcome will be a surprise for both of us."

The storyline began to play out on-screen in February 2011. Describing how it starts to develop and the effects it has on Gilly, a spokesperson for the serial told Inside Soap, "She runs into Gilly who's also got relationship problems. The drink starts to flow, and one thing leads to another... Gilly consumed with guilt over sleeping with his best friend's girlfriend, it doesn't help that Jacqui leaves Gilly's place while he's asleep - and runs into Rhys. But after Gilly wakes up, he knows he has to tell his mate what he's done. When Gilly confesses, Rhys is both furious and hurt, and lashes out violently. [...] Once he's confronted Gilly, he demands an explanation from Jacqui - and is stunned when she tells him she was actually raped, it's absolutely devastating." The storyline later takes another turn when Gilly confronts Jacqui in the village with everyone watching, leading everyone to doubt if he did commit the act or not.

It was later revealed that the details were left unclear because Lime Pictures had decided to leave the outcome of the rape trial to viewers. Viewers were given the chance to apply to be the fictional jury, consisting of a cross section of society, including non-Hollyoaks viewers. They were shown evidence from the case and then decided whether Gilly was guilty or not guilty. The chief executive of Lime Pictures, Carolyn Reynolds said, "We wanted to open up the thorny issue of how hard it is to be a juror and whether the court room is the best place to resolve some of these questions about rape." The storyline was developed with the St Mary's Sexual Assault Referral Centre and other charities. Detective Chief Inspector Ben Snuggs, leader of Don't Cross the Line campaign, explained, "This storyline represents an issue that we see all too often, involving whether consent is clear on the part of both parties involved in sexual activity, and particularly when alcohol and drugs are involved."

In late 2011, Quinlan announced his departure from Hollyoaks. The serial decided to write a conclusion to the rape storyline, broadcast in a special three-handed episode centred on Gilly, Jacqui and Rhys, which had Gilly confessing to the rape as he had known Jacqui was not consenting.

== Storylines ==
Gilly is from Manchester. When the Ashworths move to Hollyoaks, Gilly decides to move with them. He sneaks into a Halloween party at HCC, Gilly kisses Jessica Harris (Jennifer Biddall) and assumes the role of her wannabe boyfriend. This leads to him pretending to be a philosophy student just to get close to her and finds a rival in Mark Jury (Ash Newman), Jessica's real boyfriend. The two battled for affections but Jessica could not decide between them and ended both relationships. Neville (Jim Millea) buys Drive 'n' Buy and Gilly becomes an employee, mainly so he can become close to Sarah Barnes (Loui Batley). The pair start going on dates, however, Sarah loses interest. Any chance of a relationship ends when Gilly reveals Rhys Ashworth (Andrew Moss) slept with her mother, Kathy Barnes (Sarah Jane Buckley). Rhys becomes jealous over Gilly and Sarah and kicks him out of the home. Gilly moves into the student halls with ex-girlfriend, Jessica. After Gilly defends Zak Ramsey (Kent Riley) after he is accused of stealing Zoë's belongings, he and Rhys renew their friendship and he moves back into the Ashworths'. Gilly finds out Rhys is an escort and decides to be one himself, unaware the job involves nothing sexual.

Rhys discovers Gilly and Zak are planning a strip show at nightclub The Loft. Rhys agrees to join, however, is replaced by Calvin Valentine (Ricky Whittle). During the strip show, Rhys tries to chat up a girl, who is only interested in Gilly. Gilly meets a young woman named Molly Traverse (Kate Deakin), whom he is put off by when she mentions marriage. During her battle with anorexia nervosa, Hannah Ashworth (Emma Rigby) and friend, Melissa Hurst (Carla Chases), begin being horrible to Gilly. Hannah hits him, however, after returning from hospital, she apologises. After finding out his girlfriend Beth is his half-sister, Rhys begins being jealous after she and Gilly grow close. Gilly and Beth grow closer and kiss. They start a relationship and agree to take it slowly. Gilly decides to become a lifeguard. Whilst cleaning up, Gilly sees his boss, Simon Crosby (Simon Lawson), leaving a cubicle with a crying child. Gilly automatically assumes he is a paedophile. Gilly breaks into Simon's house and finds pictures of children in their swimwear, one of whom is Tom Cunningham (Ellis Hollins). He also finds a boy's room with a lock on the door. Gilly shows various residents the proof. Angry parents begin to gather outside Simon's home and vandalise it by smashing the windows. Realsing his reputation is ruined, Simon attempts suicide. Simon's wife Gemma Grosby (Gemma Langford) shows Gilly a picture of their son, who died. Gilly realises Simon is innocent and feels guilty.

Gilly goes backpacking around Thailand. At this time, Rhys and Beth Clement (Sinéad Moynihan) rekindle their romance and start an affair. Guilty, Beth leaves with Gilly and they return later in 2008. Gilly proposes to Beth, who agrees to make Rhys, who is in a relationship with Mercedes McQueen (Jennifer Metcalfe), jealous. Mercedes' sister, Michaela McQueen (Hollie-Jay Bowes), catches Rhys and Beth kissing and tells Gilly, who refuses to believe. Later, Michaela tells Gilly to go home in an attempt to make him see the truth. Gilly does so and catches Rhys and Beth sleeping together. He begins to beat up Rhys and calls the police. Realising they face a prison sentence for incest, Rhys and Beth leave Hollyoaks, however, they are involved in a car accident which results in Beth's death. After time away, Rhys returns and he and Gilly decide to make up. Gilly later meets Leila Roy (Lena Kaur) and the pair begin a relationship. The romance is short as Leila tells Gilly they cannot be together. Gilly is upset by the breakup. After a break of several months, Gilly returned. At the SU Bar, Gilly begins looking for a new girlfriend with Josh Ashworth (Sonny Flood). A drunken Hannah then throws herself at Gilly and tries to kiss him. Gilly tells her he sees her as a sister. She then apologises. In Hollyoaks: The Morning After the Night Before, Gilly goes to Manchester to party with Josh. Josh and Gilly begin a fight which ends with Gilly losing his front teeth. After returning to the village, Gilly begins to develop feelings for Steph Cunningham (Carley Stenson) and is jealous towards her relationship with Fernando Fernandez (Jeronimo Best).

Whilst at a boot camp trip with Steph and Fernando, Steph believes Gilly has feelings for Sarah, and is unaware his feelings are for her. During the trip, after Steph, Fernando and Gilly leave, Sarah is killed in a tragic parachute jump. Gilly writes a poem for Steph, and in it, offends Fernando. When Steph reads it she is angry at Gilly, who tells her it is Rhys who has the feelings for her. Fernando punches Rhys as Gilly convinces Steph he had nothing to do with the poem. In order to make Steph jealous, Gilly kisses Cheryl Brady (Bronagh Waugh), who is trying to make Calvin jealous. Despite using him, Cheryl develops true feelings for Gilly. Frankie Osborne (Helen Pearson) works out that Gilly is in love with Steph. However, Gilly denies it, saying that he loves Cheryl. Cheryl catches Gilly looking at an engagement ring, which Fernando has bought for Steph. She assumes the ring is for her and tells everyone in The Dog in the Pond that she and Gilly are getting married. Gilly reluctantly goes along, not wanting to hurt her feelings. Cheryl notices the growing closeness between Gilly and Steph and confronts him. On discovering he is in love with Steph, she breaks off their engagement, at the same time Steph and Fernando break up. Gilly goes travelling with Zoe Carpenter (Zoë Lister) and Mike Barnes (Tony Hirst). Steph, after being told about Gilly's feelings for her, rushes after him to admit her love just as Gilly leaves. Gilly returns on 5 March with his girlfriend, Jem Costello (Helen Russell-Clark). Steph is upset when he proposes to Jem. Steph admits her feelings to Gilly, but he decides to stay with Jem. Rhys tells Jem that Gilly still loves Steph causing them to split up. Gilly and Steph finally confess their true feelings to each other and begin a relationship.

Steph is diagnosed with cervical cancer and does not tell Gilly, who later finds out from Cheryl. Gilly is angry at Steph for keeping this from him. Steph undergoes a hysterectomy to remove the cancer. However, doctors tell her and Gilly it failed. She is soon told her cancer is terminal. The pair split up when Steph feels it is unfair on Gilly, but they get back together and start to plan their wedding. Gilly and Steph eventually get married beside the village river. Gilly and Steph take a walk round the village on bonfire night where she finally admits she's scared of dying, they have a heart to heart conversation where she realises she's it is how she is going to die that scares her. When the pair see restaurant Il Gnosh on fire, Gilly rings for help whilst Steph runs into the burning building to save Amy Barnes (Ashley Slanina-Davies) and her children. Gilly stands on a ladder outside and begs her to come out, however she tells him she's ready to die and walks back into the flames. Gilly deals with his grief by becoming angry that Steph has "left" him. After Rhys tries to comfort him, Gilly goes into Steph's room and trashes it after seeing that she has still kept her photo of her and her husband, Max Cunningham (Matt Littler), on their wedding day, placed on a table. Gilly argues with Steph's family as they blame him for not saving her and disagree on the funeral arrangements. Frankie then tells him that Steph had never loved him and that Max would have done anything to save Steph from the fire, making him further deeply upset and angry. He starts drinking heavily, causing trouble on many occasions.

Gilly starts dating Lynsey Nolan (Karen Hassan), he initially thinks it is too soon after Steph's death. He is shocked when she finds a lump and it halts their relationship. He sleeps with Jacqui McQueen (Claire Cooper) when they get drunk, she tells Rhys he sexually assaulted her. She reports him to the police and Gilly faces trial. Steph's family support Gilly however many villagers do not. During the trial it is shown Gilly and Jacqui remember the same events very differently. The jury find Gilly not guilty however the events ruin Gilly and Rhys' friendship as Rhys eventually believes Jacqui. Lynsey also takes Jacqui's side. Gilly then goes to spend some time away from the village. He returns in September and is given a job at Chez Chez by Cheryl leading Rhys to quit before punching him. Gilly moves in with Cheryl, and they begin to rekindle their romantic relationship. But when they try to become physically intimate, Gilly becomes overwhelmed with memories of the rape and cannot go through with sleeping with Cheryl. Later that night, he goes to Rhys' and Jacqui's flat, and in a three-hander episode, the three of them discuss everything that has happened and they all eventually come to the conclusion that Gilly did indeed rape Jacqui. Jacqui forgives him, and Gilly decides that he must leave the village. He confesses the rape to everyone in his life and says his goodbyes. Cheryl in particular is devastated by Gilly's abrupt departure and begs for him to stay, but he refuses. Jacqui comforts Cheryl as she sobs on the steps outside her flat, while Gilly and Rhys share one final look goodbye before he leaves the village forever.

== Reception ==
Quinlan was nominated for sexiest male at the 2010 Inside Soap Awards. He was also nominated in the category of "Best Serial Drama Performance" at the 2011 National Television Awards. In the same year, he was nominated in the category of "Best Actor" at the British Soap Awards. Ruth Deller of Lowculture has criticised Gilly, branding him as a poor character. Commenting on Steph's death she said, "No wonder that, gazing upon his face, she realised she was better off burning to death than enduring one more day staring at him." She praised Paul Marquess's cast cull of 2010, but said that Gilly is "still hanging around like that bit of dog mess you can’t get out of the grooves in your trainers". She also said, "A damp drizzle of a character, Gilly hasn’t worked as Rhys’s wide boy sidekick, hasn’t worked as a loved-up hippy, hasn’t worked as a doting husband, doesn’t work on any level" and that she wanted the Hollyoaks serial killer Silas Blissett (Jeff Rawle) to kill him.

Roz Laws, writing for the Sunday Mercury, felt there was "plenty of chemistry" present between Gilly and Steph. Alex Ross from Planet Radio noted how Gilly was "one of the most popular Hollyoaks character with fans".
