= William Rush (actor) =

British actor (1994–2025)

- Rush as Josh Stevenson in Waterloo Road
- Born: William Edward Rush; 6 July 1994; Bury, Greater Manchester, England
- Died: 17 December 2025 (aged 31); Salford, Greater Manchester, England
- Occupations: Actor; singer-songwriter
- Years active: 2005–2017
- Television: Waterloo Road (2009–2013)
- Children: 1
- Parent(s): Debbie Rush (mother); Andrew Rush (father)

William Edward Rush (6 July 1994 – 17 December 2025) was an English actor and singer-songwriter. He was best known for portraying the role of Josh Stevenson in the BBC school-based drama series Waterloo Road (2009–2013). In 2016, Rush appeared as a contestant on the thirteenth series of The X Factor.

== Early life ==
William Edward Rush was born on 6 July 1994 in Bury, Greater Manchester, to Andrew and Debbie Rush. His mother is also an actress. He had an older sister and a brother.

Rush attended Bamford Academy and trained at the Manchester School of Acting.

== Career ==
Rush started his career in BBC's Grange Hill playing the role of Ali Duncan, before being given a small part in Channel 4's Shameless as a lad at an ice cream van. He also appeared in Drop Dead Gorgeous and The Street. From 2009 to 2012, he played Josh Stevenson in Waterloo Road and made a guest appearance the following year.

In 2016, Rush auditioned for series 13 of The X Factor and made it through to the six-chair challenge, the third of four elimination stages.

== Death ==
On 17 December 2025, Rush died at Salford Royal Hospital at the age of 31. His mother announced the news of his death on Instagram the following day.

== Filmography ==
Television
Year	Title	Role	Notes
2007	Grange Hill	Ali Duncan	Recurring role; 6 episodes
2007	Shameless	Lad at Ice Cream Truck	Episode: "Dangerous Situation"
2007	Drop Dead Gorgeous	Lad 1	Series 2: Episode 1
2007	The Street	Jack Taylor	Episode: "The Letter"
2009–2013	Waterloo Road	Josh Stevenson	Series regular; 69 episodes
2013	Casualty	Stef Kelly	Episode: "Cross Roads"
2014	Coronation Street	Ian	1 episode
2014	Vera	Ryan Darrow	Episode: "On Harbour Street"
2016	The X Factor	Himself	Contestant; series 13
2017	Friday On My Mind	George Young	Miniseries; 2 episodes In his final television appearance

Radio
Year	Title	Role
2010	Lost Boy Logan	Andrew Logan
2011	Elidor	Nicholas Watson
