= Neville Ashworth =

Fictional character from Hollyoaks

- Hollyoaks character
- Portrayed by: Jim Millea
- Duration: 2005–2010
- First appearance: 30 September 2005
- Last appearance: 14 July 2010
- Introduced by: David Hanson
In-universe information
- Occupation: Businessman/landlord
- Family: Ashworth
- Father: Bill Ashworth
- Brothers: Noel Ashworth
- Wife: Suzanne Ashworth
- Sons: Josh Ashworth
- Daughters: Hannah Ashworth
- Stepsons: Rhys Ashworth; Jack Osborne
- Stepdaughters: Francine Osborne
- Nephews: Rhys Ashworth
- Nieces: Beth Clement

Neville Ashworth is a fictional character from the British Channel 4 soap opera, Hollyoaks, played by Jim Millea. He debuted on-screen during the episode airing on 30 September 2005 and was introduced by David Hanson. Neville departed in July 2010 with his wife Suzanne Ashworth (Suzanne Hall) and their son Josh Ashworth (Sonny Flood), after they were all axed by new executive producer Paul Marquess.

== Character creation ==
=== Backstory ===
Neville Ashworth is one of the main 'adult' characters in Hollyoaks and the head of the Ashworth family. As such, the character has provided the parental viewpoint in storylines that cover issues such as eating disorders, incest, drug addiction and misattributed parentage. In contrast to this role, he is also the comic relief in many scenes, with Neville characterised as old fashioned, boring and somewhat bigoted, in the tradition of former character, Gordon Cunningham. Like Gordon, Neville is also a small businessman and owns the local shop, Drive 'n' Buy. In late 2008, the character became the local publican when he purchased The Dog in the Pond.

=== Casting ===
Actor Jim Millea was given the role after regular auditions for Neville's character in the Ashworth family, he was created by David Hanson. In early 2010, it was announced that Allan had stepped down from the position of executive producer and that Paul Marquess had taken over the role. It was soon revealed that Marquess planned to give Hollyoaks a "shake up", changing the productions team In February 2010, it was announced that new series producer Paul Marquess had decided not to renew Millea's contract, along with Suzanne Hall and Sonny Flood's contracts. Hall and Flood portray Neville's on-screen wife and son respectively. A Channel 4 spokesperson stated: "It was only time before some were given the boot. Everyone knows that the new captain's reputation precedes him as far as putting a stamp on a show is concerned." The continued: "He's getting rid of the dead wood — nobody is safe. This is just the beginning. Over the next few months expect to wave goodbye to even more faces." Marquess later revealed he axed the Ashworths because he believed The Dog should have a lively family at the heart of it, that the Ashworths had become grim because of their hard hitting storylines.

== Storylines ==
=== 2005–2010 ===
Neville arrives with the rest of the Ashworth clan in 2005, moving into the Hunter family's old home. The local businessman, he is married to Suzanne (Suzanne Hall) and his children are Rhys (Andrew Moss), Hannah (Emma Rigby) and Josh (Sonny Flood). In 2007, Neville discovered that Suzanne had slept with his brother Noel (Craig Cheetham), 20 years ago and his eldest son, Rhys, was not actually his biological son, but his nephew. Neville claims he knew nothing about the affair. Rhys decides he wants nothing to do with him for several weeks and moves in with his father. Eventually Noel shows his true colours and leaves Hollyoaks. Rhys returns home and rebuilds his relationship with Neville. In September 2007, it is discovered that Hannah has an eating disorder. Neville has difficulty understanding this and tension begins amongst the Ashworths. Neville finds out that Noel has died. Neville quickly plans Noel's funeral and wake. Rhys does not want to go to his father's funeral; however, Josh finally convinces him to attend the wake. Rhys tells Neville that he is the man who has raised him and so he will always see Neville as his father.

When Hannah returns from hospital, the family try their best to support her. Neville finds out she is in a relationship with Danny Valentine (David Judge) and is not too pleased. Whilst he says his reason is that Hannah had been advised not to enter a relationship while recovering from her eating disorder, his real objection is Danny's skin colour. Later, Neville tries to accept Danny. In April 2008, Neville and the rest of the family are shattered when they learn Rhys is having an affair with his half-sister, Beth (Sinéad Moynihan), who is engaged to family friend, Gilly Roach (Anthony Quinlan). Further trauma occurs when Beth and Rhys are in a serious accident which kills Beth. In November 2008, Neville buys The Dog in the Pond in a private auction. He also purchased a number of council flats in Hollyoaks. Neville renames The Dog "The Jolly Roger". However, he changes it back after discovering it has turned into a gay bar. In 2009, Neville, along with Suzanne, Rhys and Josh, assume Hannah has taken a relapse after finding food, planted by Ash Roy (Junade Khan), in her room. Innocent Hannah tries to explain it was Ash, but the Ashworths do not believe her. Hannah then moves out as she cannot cope with living with people who do not trust her. Hannah continues to have problems until leaving in early 2010.

In spring 2010, Josh is the driver in a car crash which injures several people. None of the family knows that Rhys had spiked Josh's drink, and they all blame Josh. Neville and the family cut Josh out of their lives and as a result, on Suzanne's birthday dinner, Josh punches Neville. Acting on Josh's behaviour, Neville reports his own son to the police. Josh is sentenced to prison for his role in the car crash, and the family falls further apart. To make matters worse, Suzanne begins a sexual affair with Hannah's fiancé Darren Osborne (Ashley Taylor Dawson) at Calvin (Ricky Whittle) and Carmel Valentine's (Gemma Merna) wedding. Suzanne tries to resist, but soon Rhys catches them as they are about to have sex. When Rhys tells Neville about the affair, Neville throws Suzanne out of the family home. When Josh returns early from his prison sentence, Neville and Suzanne reconcile. Ultimately Neville decides they need a clean break, and they tell Josh that since he started their problems, he will stay behind while the rest of the family move to Spain. A guilt-ridden Rhys, unable to convince Neville to change his mind, confesses that he was the one who caused Josh's car crash. Neville is furious with Rhys, who then stays behind in Josh's place, to help sell The Dog. In spite of Neville's anger, he hugs Rhys goodbye, suggesting he will forgive Rhys.

In January 2011, Suzanne unexpectedly returns to Hollyoaks. She reveals that Neville is divorcing her as she is pregnant with Darren's twins.

In December 2012, Suzanne returns for Rhys' funeral and reveals that Neville could not make it as he recently had surgery on his back and couldn't fly out.
