= Black Beauty (1994 film) =

1994 family drama film

- Theatrical release poster
- Directed by: Caroline Thompson
- Screenplay by: Caroline Thompson
- Based on: Black Beauty by Anna Sewell
- Produced by: Peter MacGregor-Scott; Robert Shapiro
- Starring: Sean Bean; David Thewlis
- Cinematography: Alex Thomson
- Edited by: Claire Simpson
- Music by: Danny Elfman
- Production company: Warner Bros.
- Distributed by: Warner Bros.
- Release date: July 29, 1994
- Running time: 88 minutes
- Countries: United Kingdom; United States
- Language: English
- Budget: $15 million
- Box office: $4.6 million

Black Beauty is a 1994 family drama film, written and directed by Caroline Thompson in her directorial debut. The fifth cinematic adaptation of Anna Sewell's 1877 novel of the same name, the film stars Andrew Knott, who, the year prior, had played Dicken in The Secret Garden (another of Caroline Thompson's film credits, as screenwriter), as well as Sean Bean, David Thewlis and Alan Cumming as Black Beauty. Produced and distributed by Warner Bros., under their Warner Bros. Family Entertainment label, the film's story is told as an autobiography of the horse Black Beauty (as in the novel), with Cumming's voiceover narration as Beauty leading viewers through the trials of the horse's life through his own eyes.

== Plot ==
Black Beauty narrates his own story. He is born on a farm in the English countryside during the 19th century and remains by his mother's side until he is sent to Birtwick Park to serve Squire Gordon and his family.

Lady Gordon, the squire's sick wife, is pleased by the beautiful horse and gives him his trademark name, Black Beauty. Beauty becomes smitten with the squire's cynical chestnut mare, Ginger, who rebuffs his attempts to be friendly. However, Beauty also befriends Merrylegs, a perky grey pony who gives rides to the squire's young daughters, but dislikes the squire's son.

On a stormy night, Beauty is pulling a carriage holding the squire and his caretaker, John Manly, home from town. Sensing danger, he refuses to cross a partially flooded bridge. When John tries to pull him to move, Beauty steadfastly refuses. When the bridge finally gives way, crashing into the river, John slips and falls in, but manages to hang on to Beauty's bridle. Beauty and the squire save John, and they again head off back home. Joe Green, who works in the stable, volunteers to look after Beauty that night. Joe's lack of knowledge about horses causes him to give Beauty ice cold water to drink and to neglect to dry him off or cover him with a rug overnight, which causes Beauty to fall sick. The following few days John, Joe, and the squire treat and nurse Beauty, and he recovers.

Lady Gordon's illness gets worse, and she is taken to a doctor in a carriage pulled by Beauty and Ginger. When they stop at an inn for the night, the barn where the horses are being kept catches on fire due to a carelessly dropped pipe. Luckily, Joe rescues the horses. Lady Gordon's doctor orders her to leave England for a warmer place because her illness is so severe. The squire and his family bid a sad goodbye to John, Joe, and the beloved horses. Merrylegs is given to the vicar who promises never to sell the pony.

Beauty and Ginger are taken to Earlshall Park, home of the Lord and Lady of Wexmire, and Joe bids a tearful goodbye to Beauty. Beauty and Ginger are paired up to pull Lady Wexmire's carriage, but she demands that the horses wear uncomfortable bearing reins to raise their heads high, which angers Ginger. When the next day Lady Wexmire orders the horse's heads be strapped up even further, Ginger breaks away from the carriage in a rage, leading to Lady Wexmire forbidding her any further use on her carriage-dragging. She is later used for racing by the Wexmire's son, who whips her heavily and strains her back.

Reuben Smith, the horses caretaker, rides to town with Beauty to take a carriage to be repainted. He becomes drunk at the local tavern. Despite warnings from a blacksmith's apprentice, he nevertheless roughly rides Beauty home, who is losing one of his horse shoes. When the shoe finally falls off, Beauty stumbles and throws Reuben off the saddle, causing both rider and horse to suffer injuries. Both are found the next morning by Wexmire's men. Reuben is sacked from his job, and Beauty is later sold by Lord Wexmire due to his disfigured knees. Beauty is bought by a man who keeps horses for renting, but treats them terribly. He is eventually taken to a fair, where he briefly spots Joe, now a grown-up, but Joe doesn't notice him. Beauty's whinnies instead catch the attention of Jerry Barker, a taxi carriage driver from London, who is immediately taken by Beauty and buys him once successfully haggling the cost down to 17 guineas.

Jerry introduces Beauty to his warm family - wife and two young children, who name him Black Jack. Though Beauty dislikes the harshness of London, he nevertheless likes his job as a taxi cab horse and Jerry's kind treatment of him. One day, Beauty spots and reunites with Ginger; she is now a cab horse who has suffered from years of abuse by her owner. Beauty begs for her not to give up, but too soon she is led away by her owner on a fare. Sometime later, Beauty spots her dead body on a wagon, her troubles finally over. One snowy night, Jerry has a dreadful cough that worsens as he's kept waiting for hours outdoors in the freezing weather for his passengers to leave a party. His condition then worsens and a doctor advises him to quit his job and move to the countryside. Beauty is reluctantly sold to a grain dealer where he's forced to pull heavy loads of flour. After two years of pulling heavy carts, he collapses from utter exhaustion.

Beauty is taken to a fair to be sold, but he is now so weak and in such poor condition that many reject him. Then Farmer Thoroughgood and his grandson spot Beauty, and a young man sees him, too. Beauty realizes that the young man is Joe on recognizing his voice, and though he is hardly able to, he finds the strength and whinnies for his old friend and the two are finally reunited. Beauty lives the remainder of his life at Thoroughgood's farm with Joe, who promises that he will never sell Beauty.

== Cast ==
- Docs Keepin Time as Black Beauty (horse)
- Alan Cumming as Black Beauty (voice)
- Andrew Knott as Joe Green
  - Ian Kelsey as older Joe Green
- Sean Bean as Farmer Grey
- David Thewlis as Jerry Barker
- Jim Carter as John Manly
- Peter Davison as Squire Gordon
- Rosalind Ayres as Mistress Gordon
- Alun Armstrong as Reuben Smith
- John McEnery as Mr. York
- Eleanor Bron as Lady Wexmire
- Peter Cook as Lord Wexmire
- Adrian Ross Magenty as Lord George Wexmire
- Keeley Flanders as Dolly Barker
- Niall O'Brien as Farmer Thoroughgood

== Release ==
=== Box office ===
The film did not recoup its budget and performed poorly at the box office, grossing only $4,630,377 domestically.

=== Critical reception ===
Black Beauty received generally positive reviews upon its release. Review aggregator Rotten Tomatoes reports that 74% of 19 critics have given the film a positive review, with a rating average of 6.7 out of 10.

Roger Ebert of the Chicago Sun-Times gave the film a mediocre review, objecting to the horse's voiceover: "[I]t plays like a cross between New Age mysticism and anthropomorphism run amok." Similarly, Lisa Schwarzbaum of Entertainment Weekly found the narration to have "the effect of making a basically charming story go drippy." However, she concluded her review by conceding that "girls will inevitably love all this."

=== Year-end lists ===
- Top 10 (listed alphabetically, not ranked) – William Arnold, Seattle Post-Intelligencer
- Honorable mention – Betsy Pickle, Knoxville News-Sentinel
- Honorable mention – David Elliott, The San Diego Union-Tribune

== Soundtrack ==
Black Beauty

Film score by Danny Elfman
- Released: July 19, 1994
- Genre: Soundtrack
- Label: Giant

Danny Elfman chronology
The Nightmare Before Christmas (1993)	Black Beauty (1994)	Mission: Impossible (1996)

The film's score was written by Danny Elfman and was released on CD and cassette tape through Warner Bros.' Giant Records label.

Track listing

1. Main titles
2. Baby Beauty
3. Gang on the Run
4. Mommy
5. Jump for Joy
6. Kicking up a Storm
7. The Dance/ Bye Merrylegs
8. Sick
9. He's Back (Revival)
10. Frolic
11. Ginger Snaps
12. Goodbye Joe
13. Wild Ride/ Dream
14. Is it Joe?
15. In the Country
16. Poor Ginger
17. Bye Jerry/ Hard times
18. Memories
19. End Credits

== See also ==
- List of films about horses
