= Jessica Baglow =

English actress (born 1989)

Jessica Baglow (born 23 March 1989) is an English actress, known for Gentleman Jack, Where the Heart Is and Waterloo Road.

== Early life and career ==
Baglow was born in Doncaster, South Yorkshire, England. She began her acting career at the age of 7, being cast as Pam Ferris's daughter, Lucy Snow, in the popular ITV series Where The Heart Is. She was one of the show's original cast members, but after 6 series her character left with her screen father for a new life away from Yorkshire. After leaving Where the Heart Is she then appeared in a number of adverts for Oxo in 2003 in the company's bid to introduce a new Oxo family, but the adverts failed to take off. After a couple of acting roles in TV shows Wing and a Prayer and Doctors she gained notice in an episode of the first series of BBC's The Street in 2006.

Further parts in New Street Law and a semi regular role in TV soap Emmerdale followed in 2007, before at the age of 18 Baglow was cast as Karla Bentham in Waterloo Road. Her portrayal of a student with Asperger syndrome won acclaim and gained her considerable notice during her three years on the show, as she began to progress from child roles to more adult subjects. Baglow subsequently trained at the prestigious London Academy of Music and Dramatic Art (LAMDA) graduating in 2012.

== Career ==
Baglow primarily focused on television as a child, but upon graduating from LAMDA she gained many highly praised theatre credits. In 2015, she was commended at the Ian Charleson Awards for her role as Marina in Dominic Dromgoole's production of Pericles at Shakespeare's Globe theatre. Dominic Cavendish of The Daily Telegraph wrote: "Jessica Baglow is a big find as Pericles's daughter Marina – calmness and dignity personified in her perturbing scenes of abduction and sexual exploitation."

In 2019, she appeared in the acclaimed BBC series Gentleman Jack, about the lesbian diarist and noblewoman Anne Lister, playing her ladies maid Hemingway. It was a significant series for Baglow to do, as around the same time in her personal life she came out as gay and in a relationship on her Instagram account. Her character returned for the show's 2nd series in 2022. Between then she has also appeared in Silent Witness in the episode "Reputations" as the character DI Ruth Cracknell, the drama Floodlights and The Railway Children Return.

== Filmography ==
=== Television ===
Year	Title	Role	Notes
1997–2002	Where the Heart Is	Lucy Snow	56 episodes
1999	Wing and a Prayer	Katy Williams	Series 2, Episode 8
2004	Doctors	Sasha	Episode: A Wing and a Prayer
2006	The Street	Jenna Doran	Episode: The Flasher
2006	Sorted	Kelly	Episode 4
2007	New Street Law	Leah	Series 2, Episode 3
2007	Doctors	Laura Hine	Episode: Quid Pro Quo
2007-2008	Emmerdale	Emma Fairbank	
2007-2010	Waterloo Road	Karla Bentham	42 episodes
2008	MasterChef	Herself	Series 4, Episode 29
2009	Doctors	Candice Bradshaw	Episode: Standing Up
2010	Moving On	Mizzy	Episode: Skies of Glass
2013	Holby City	Dawn Mallory	Episode: Unravelled
2019–2022	Gentleman Jack	Hemingway	
2020	Vera	Ronnie Bennions	Episode: The Escape Turn
2021	Silent Witness	DI Ruth Cracknell	2 Episodes: Reputations
2022	Floodlights	DC Grace	

=== Film ===
Year	Title	Role
2009	Salvage	Leanne
2017	Apostasy	Cousin Michelle
2022	The Railway Children Return	Angela
2022	Allelujah	Dr. Jess

== Theatre credits ==
Year	Title	Role	Theatre
2015	Pericles	Marina	Shakespeare's Globe
2017	Educating Rita	Rita	Bolton Octagon
2020	Quality Street	Phoebe Throssel	Viaduct Theatre, Halifax
