= Where the Heart Is (British TV series) =

British television drama series (1997–2006)

- Genre: Drama
- Created by: Vicky Featherstone; Ashley Pharoah
- Starring: Cast
- Opening theme: "Where the Heart Is" by Prefab Sprout
- Country of origin: United Kingdom
- Original language: English
- No. of series: 10
- No. of episodes: 110 (List of episodes)

Production
- Running time: 60 minutes
- Production companies: United Productions (later Granada) with: Anglia Television (1997–2001); Meridian Broadcasting (2002–2005); Granada Television (2006)

Original release
- Network: ITV
- Release: 6 April 1997 – 10 September 2006

Where the Heart Is is a British drama television series created by Ashley Pharoah and Vicky Featherstone, set in the fictional Yorkshire town of Skelthwaite. The series, which first aired on ITV in the United Kingdom on 6 April 1997, focuses on the lives of a group of district nurses and their families who reside in the town. The show was created after Featherstone visited the Yorkshire town of Meltham and was intrigued by the tight-knit community, particularly those connected to the local district nursing office. She approached Pharoah with her ideas, and they pitched the show to ITV; after the network ordered production of the first series, they – along with producer Kate Anthony – began creating the show. The series was filmed in the Colne and Holme valleys of West Yorkshire, mainly in the villages of Marsden, Slaithwaite and the town of Meltham.

Where the Heart Is focuses on the stories that occur in small communities without being sentimental. Pharoah wanted to explore the hidden conflicts that occur within the families and friends. Margaret Tiffany, a real-life Meltham district nurse, provided Featherstone with the premise of the show. She was employed as a script advisor and coached the cast and helped the production create an authentic representation of life in the Colne, and Holme Valley communities. Where the Heart Is initially focuses on five main characters from the Snow and Goddard family. In later series it expanded its focus to additional characters using an ensemble cast format. On 12 October 2006, ITV announced that the tenth series was the last as they decided to focus on creating other shows. The final episode was broadcast on 10 September 2006.

== Plot overview ==
Where the Heart Is focuses on the personal lives of two district nurses in the small Yorkshire town of Skelthwaite. The official ITV website described the series as "an engaging story of life, love, family and people’s ever-changing fortunes in rural England. Set against the rugged landscape of Yorkshire, it follows the busy professional and family lives of District Nurses, as they bring nursing and emotional care to young and old alike." Initially, it mainly concentrated on the lives of two of the district health nurses, Peggy Snow (Pam Ferris) and Ruth Goddard (Sarah Lancashire). The story expands to focus on the lives of more Skelthwhaite residents, particularly those related to the nurses as well as those working in a local toilet paper factory.

== Production ==
Where the Heart Is was created by Ashley Pharoah and Vicky Featherstone. The show is a drama series and was made for ITV's "prime time" television slot. The series was filmed in the Colne valley of West Yorkshire, mainly in the villages of Marsden and Slaithwaite, and the town of Meltham. The production team would also use Huddersfield Town Hall as an occasional filming location. The show's theme song, also titled "Where the Heart Is", was performed by the band Prefab Sprout.

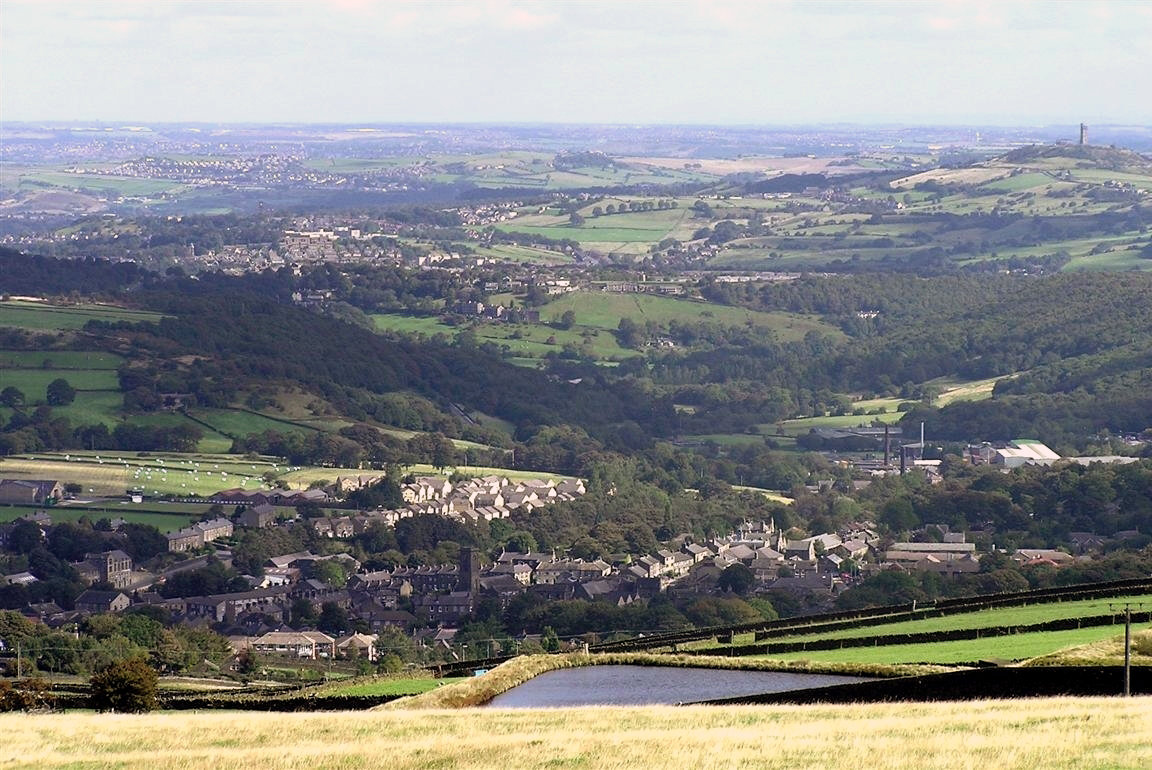
The Yorkshire town of Meltham became the premise for the show's setting and stories.

Featherstone's inspiration for the series came from a visit to the Colne Valley, where she attended a wedding. Featherstone was intrigued by a close-knit community based in Meltham, particularly the district nurses working in the town. Featherstone had previously worked with Pharoah writing for the BBC television drama Silent Witness. She recalled that he was keen to create a story about a teenager who wanted to break away from a tight-knit community, and thought that the two stories could be combined. When Featherstone approached Pharoah with her idea, he was uninterested in the concept because he believed it "sounded soft and sentimental". She convinced Pharoah to accompany her to Meltham where they visited a small district nursing office. After conversing with the staff, Pharoah realised they had valid stories which had the potential to be explored fully on a television series. After two days in Meltham, Pharoah was determined to create the show. He had even envisioned all the characters based on the people he had met and thought of storylines.

Pharoah was soon hired by United Productions, where Featherstone was already employed, to write a script. The pair knew the show would need to be suitable for a pre-watershed time slot and were mindful to exclude profanity and nudity. Pharoah was adamant that Where the Heart Is would not be sentimental and would include conflict. The decision to make the two main characters female was made to give the show a "maternal heart". Pharoah decided to make certain characters related to add to the conflict that arises from family disagreements. Pharoah observed a toilet paper factory in Meltham and decided to incorporate it into the scripts because it dominated the town's employment. He told Deborah and Anthony Hayward, in their book Where the Heart Is, that "I thought it would be good to have that sense of industry. It gave us a workplace for the men that added a completely different angle from the women's nursing storylines." The show also features a local rugby team, with their story providing the more comedic elements of the series; Pharoah was a keen rugby fan and thought it added good balance to some of the show's "dark storylines". The story which set the tone for the show was the issue of euthanasia. In the opening episode the lead characters help their patient to die. Originally ITV was not keen on exploring the issue, but changed their stance after reading Pharoah's scripts. The network was also concerned about the show's structure in regards to its equal focus on all of the characters. They believed the programme better suited a "pyramid structure", in which the matriarchal character of Peggy was at the top.

Simon Lewis took on the role of the executive producer of Where the Heart Is. Kate Anthony was hired as the show's producer and was intrigued by the story of a woman choosing how she wanted to die. She met with Featherstone and Pharoah to discuss the series and travelled to the Yorkshire towns of Meltham, Marsden and Slaithwaite, which she decided to use as filming locations for the show. Naming the show's main town Skelthwaite was inspired by the real village of Slaithwaite. Anthony recalled watching the sun gleam over the Yorkshire moors and feeling that the show had found its home. She then set about finding the show's cast with the help of Lewis and casting director Gail Stevens.

One of Featherstone's biggest inspirations for the series was Margaret Tiffany, a district nursing sister based in Meltham. Tiffany had 23 years' experience working her role in the Colne Valley area. She helped Pharoah research information for the stories included in the first series of the show and assisted cast members with their research as well, particularly Ferris. Tiffany also acted as a nursing advisor, providing information on medical practises and procedures, coaching the cast in how to perform first aid, apply bandages, and take a patient's blood pressure. Filming began in the British winter of 1996. They soon discovered they had to exclude the use of medical aprons in scenes because they affected on-set lighting. Ferris told Hayward that "we decided to take liberties with that sort of thing", noting it was a drama rather than a factual documentary. Where the Heart Is debuted on ITV on 6 April 1997. The first episode was watched by more than ten million viewers during its first broadcast in the United Kingdom.

On 12 October 2006, it was announced that ITV had decided to not renew the show for an additional series. The show was dropped despite high ratings, averaging more than six million viewers per episode. A publicist from the channel stated "Where the Heart Is has been a very successful series for ITV1. But the decision has been taken in order to create some flexibility for new programme ideas in that 8pm Sunday slot." The show's producer, Ian Hopkins, said he was "sorry" the show had been cancelled and added "I would like to thank you for all your support for the programme over the last 10 years."

== Cast and characters ==
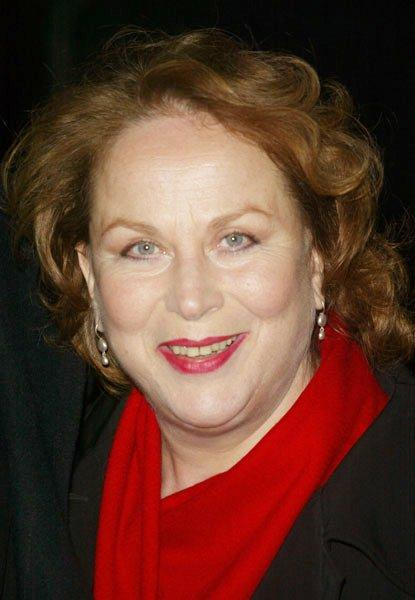
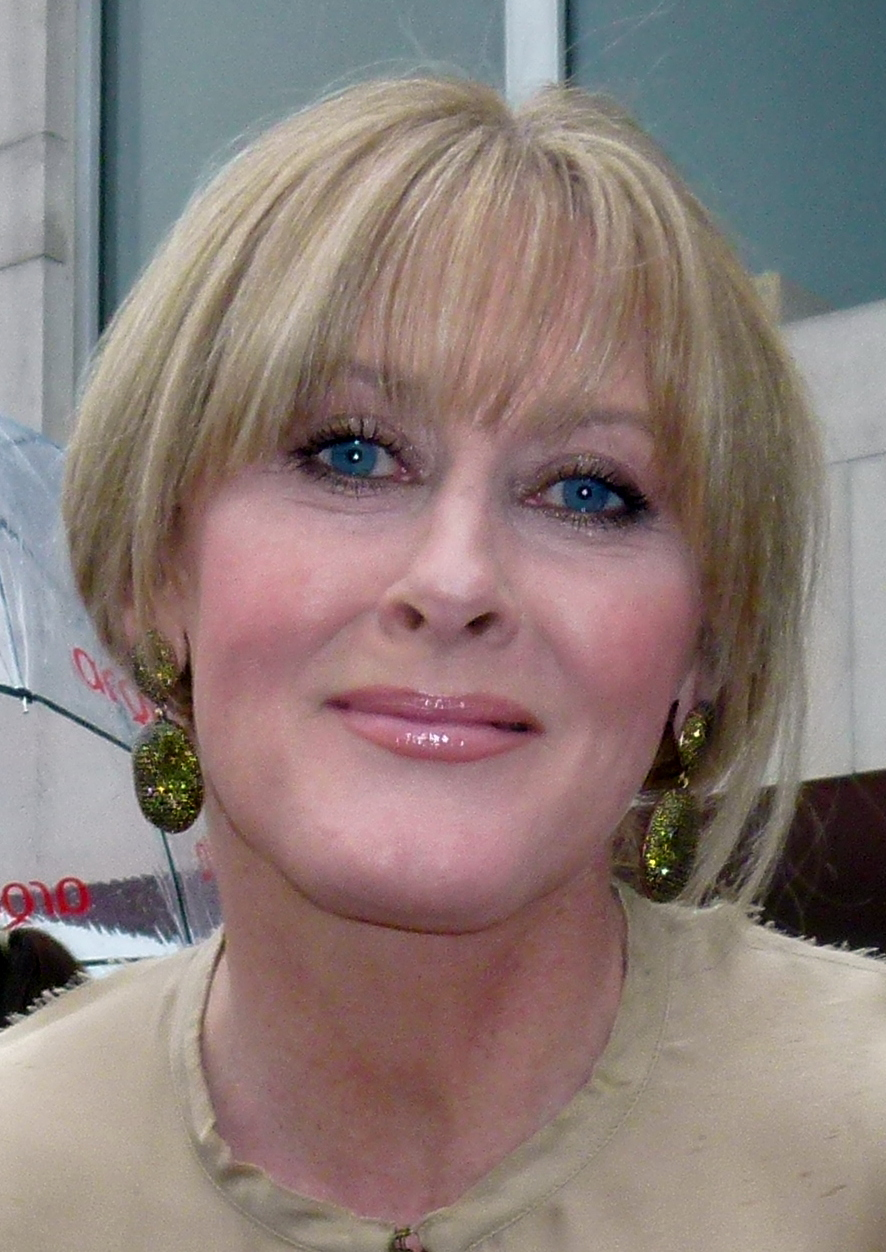
Pam Ferris and Sarah Lancashire play the original female leads, Peggy Snow and Ruth Goddard.

The series initially focused on the Snow and Goddard family, which was headed by matriarch Peggy Snow. The character was based on Pharoah's mother Maureen, sharing her "decency, warmth and down-to-earth humanity." Peggy's role in the series was to drive the stories featured in each episode by being an investigator. Anthony told Hayward that Peggy's characterisation could be interpreted as nosiness but her "caring and inquisitive" nature allowed her to "wheedle out the stories". Anthony wanted to find an actress who could portray Peggy's "tremendous strength and resolve" alongside her "warmth and humour". The casting team decided to approach actress Pam Ferris for the part. Ferris had previously played matriarch Ma Larkin in The Darling Buds of May. She had previously refused other similar roles but liked the scripts for Where the Heart Is. She explained that the show was "daring" for portraying euthanasia and which made her want the role.

The role of Peggy's sister-in-law Ruth Goddard was given to Sarah Lancashire. She had been approached with the role while she was still appearing in the soap opera Coronation Street as Raquel Watts. Ferris and Lancashire being so well known for other roles worried Pharoah but having watched them perform and learning of their commitment to their new roles, he accepted them. Pharoah scripted Ruth very differently to Peggy; he stated that he wanted "someone who was lively, younger, less experienced and a little disrespectful." Pharoah was inspired to do so having met a nurse with similar characteristics. He decided that they should be best friends and sisters-in-law in order to create tension and conflict in their friendship via family disagreements.

Auditions for the male leads proved difficult for casting directors, who were determined to find actors that matched the strength that Ferris and Lancashire offered their respective role. Anthony auditioned countless actors and was fearful that casting the wrong person as Peggy's husband Vic Snow would ruin the relationship dynamic they envisioned. Tony Haygarth auditioned and was cast as Vic; according to Anthony he stood out because "he had all the qualities of strength and humour – as well as the potential to be a bit grumpy." Vic was scripted as a well loved family man but has never amounted to great success materially. Thomas Craig was selected to play Simon Goddard, Ruth's husband and Peggy's younger brother. Simon was one of the final original characters to be cast, with Thomas receiving the offer weeks prior to filming. He had auditioned for another role and during his audition he tried to sell some cheap fireworks. This caused Anthony to offer him the role of Simon because she thought his behaviour better suited Simon. The character of Simon was pivotal to the show, not only as Peggy's sibling but the owner of the local toilet paper factory. He was characterised as a Thatcherite but also liked being a part of his community. He was portrayed as "ruthless and ambitious" but his role of an employer made him one of Skelwhaite's main providers. William Ash was hired to play Peggy and Vic's son, Stephen Snow. He was transformed into the character that Pharoah had always wanted to create; the teenager keen to move away from a tight-knit community. This characterisation was what initially prompted Featherstone approach Pharoah to create the series. Stephen was portrayed as loath to end up like his father Vic, who had settled for a life time lived in a small community. Jessica Baglow completed the Snow family, playing Peggy and Vic's young daughter Lucy.

Other original characters featured in the series included William Travis as factory worker Dick Lampard, Andrew Knott as Stephen's best friend Henry Green, Maggie Wells as part-time district nurse Patricia Illingworth and Laura Crossley as Deborah Allis. Graham Turner played Walter Charlton, a recurring character created by Pharoah. Anthony disliked his "old man" characterisation and decided to rewrite him. Turner originally auditioned for another role in the series, but Anthony believed he fitted her plans for Walter. He has learning difficulties, which Anthony was keen to portray in Where The Heart Is. She thought that television series were often scared to fully explore learning difficulties and she wanted to show how people like Walter fit into a community.

=== Cast list ===
- Pam Ferris as Peggy Snow (series 1–4)
- Sarah Lancashire as Ruth Goddard (series 1–3)
- Tony Haygarth as Vic Snow (series 1–6)
- Thomas Craig as Simon Goddard (series 1–6, 9)
- Andrew Knott as Henry Green (series 1–5)
- William Ash (series 1–2) and Jason Done (series 3–5) as Stephen Snow
- Jessica Baglow as Lucy Snow (series 1–6)
- Maggie Wells as Patricia Illingworth (series 1–3)
- William Travis as Dick Lampard (series 1–6)
- Marsha Thomason (series 2–3) and Paulette P Williams (series 4–5) as Jacqui Richards
- Kathryn Hunt (series 2–4) and Phillippa Wilson (series 5–6) as Cheryl Lampard
- Susannah Wise as Wendy Atkins (series 1)
- Laura Crossley as Deborah Alliss (series 1–3)
- Graham Turner as Walter Charlton (series 1–4)
- Neil McCaul as Keith Harrison (series 3)
- Melanie Kilburn as Sandra Harrison (series 3)
- Alex Carter as Craig Harrison (series 3)
- Lesley Dunlop as Anna Kirkwall (series 4–10)
- Christian Cooke as Luke Kirkwall (series 4–10)
- Philip Middlemiss as David Buckley (series 4–10)
- Leslie Ash as Karen Buckley (series 4–7)
- Kelly Wenham as Jess Buckley (series 4–7)
- Vincenzo Pellegrino as Chris Eckersley (series 4–5)
- Tom Chadbon as Dr. Kenworthy (series 5–10)
- Kerrie Taylor as Beth Enright (series 5–9)
- Katie Riddoch as Molly Beresford (series 6–9)
- Julian Lewis Jones as Tom Beresford (series 6–9)
- Danny Seward as Joe Beresford (series 6–9)
- Andrew Paul as Billy Boothe (series 7–10)
- Adam Paul Harvey as Nathan Boothe (series 7–10)
- Keith Barron as Alan Boothe (series 7–8)
- Samantha Giles as Sally Boothe (series 7–9, guest 10)
- Holly Grainger (series 7–9) and Holly Lucas (series 10) as Megan Boothe
- Brian Capron as Ozias Harding (series 8–10)
- Georgia Tennant as Alice Harding (series 8–9)
- Jessica Childs-Cavill as Amy Kirkwall (series 9–10)
- Molly Martin & Millie Martin as Rachel Kirkwall (series 9–10)
- Richard Mylan as Danny Flint (series 9–10)
- Taylor Bourke as Cady Flint (series 9–10)
- Denise van Outen as Kim Blakeney (series 9–10)
- Shobna Gulati as Nisha Clayton (series 10)
- Ian Kelsey as Jack Clayton (series 10)
- Fiona Wade as Rowan Clayton (series 10)
- Andrea Lowe as Zoë Phelps (series 10)
- Joanna Riding as Terri Gough (series 10)
- Wesley Nelson as Alfie Gough (series 10)

== Series overview ==
Series	Episodes	Originally released		
Series	Episodes	First released	Last released	Network
1	6	6 April 1997	11 May 1997	ITV
2	10	19 April 1998	5 July 1998	ITV
3	14	18 April 1999	25 July 1999	ITV
4	16	30 April 2000	3 September 2000	ITV
5	16	22 April 2001	12 August 2001	ITV
6	12	21 April 2002	7 July 2002	ITV
7	9	6 July 2003	23 December 2003	ITV
8	8	11 July 2004	29 August 2004	ITV
9	10	26 June 2005	28 August 2005	ITV
10	9	16 July 2006	10 September 2006	ITV

== Home media ==
=== Books ===
A tie-in book based on the characters of Peggy and Ruth, written by Kate Lock, was released on 7 May 1998. A television companion book was released on 28 October 1999.

=== VHS releases ===
Series 1 of Where the Heart Is was released on VHS on 26 October 1998.

=== DVD releases ===
Series 1–4 were released on DVD by Network between 2006–2014, with all four series re-released together in a boxset in 2023. Series 5–10 remain unreleased on any physical media format.

DVD title	Ep. #	Release date (Region 2 – UK)	Discs #	BBFC rating	Ref.
The Complete First Series	6	27 March 2006	2	PG	
The Complete Second Series	10	21 May 2012	3	PG	
The Complete Third Series	14	6 May 2013	4	PG	
The Complete Fourth Series	16	10 March 2014	4	PG	
The Complete Series 1–4	46	10 April 2023	13	PG	
