= Manchester School of Acting =

- 14–32 Hewitt St Deansgate; Manchester, M15 4GB; United Kingdom

Information
- Established: 2000
- Principal: Mark Hudson
- Website: http://www.manchesterschoolofacting.co.uk/

The Manchester School of Acting is a drama school that provides training in film, television and theatre and operates in the Deansgate area of Manchester, United Kingdom established in 2000.

== History ==
Manchester School of Acting was founded by the actor Mark Hudson in 2000 he eventually moved into television producing for the BBC the school's follows an American approach to drama training consistent with that such as naturalism and others. The school offers acting courses focused towards film, television and theatre.

== Courses ==
Include:

- MSA Diploma in Acting
- MSA Advanced Diploma in Acting

== Additional classes ==
Include.

- Accent Reduction
- Archetypes
- Audition technique (theatre)
- Audition technique (TV)
- Audition technique (film)
- Dialect
- Movement and Posture
- Self-taping dialect
- Showreel preparation
- The business of being an actor

== Notable alumni ==
Include:

- Dean Andrews
- Warren Brown
- Kelly Condron
- Keith Duffy
- Miles Higson
- Milo Callaghan
- Rob James-Collier
- Amy James-Kelly
- Suranne Jones
- Michelle Keegan
- Sally Lindsay
- Phil Mealey
- Nico Mirallegro
- Kieron Moore
- Sinéad Moynihan
- Sophie McShera
- Gemma Merna
- Debbie Rush
- William Rush
- Mollie Winnard

== See also ==
- Arden School of Theatre
- Manchester School of Theatre
