= Andrew Knott =

British actor (born 1979)

- Born: 22 November 1979 (age 46); Salford, Greater Manchester, England
- Occupation: Actor
- Years active: 1993–present
- Children: 2

Andrew Knott (born 22 November 1979) is an English actor. He is known for portraying Dickon Sowerby in 1993 film adaptation The Secret Garden, based on the novel by Frances Hodgson Burnett, and as Henry Green in the television drama series Where the Heart Is. He has also appeared in the sitcom Gavin & Stacey as Dirtbox.

== Life and career ==
Knott was born in Salford. His first acting was done in British television and radio programmes. He was trained in the Oldham Theatre Workshop. Knott's first major film was Warner Brothers' The Secret Garden in 1993, in which he played Dickon Sowerby. He went on to play Joe Green in Black Beauty. In the late 1990s, he played Darren Featherstone and Liam Shepherd in Coronation Street.

In 2004, he returned to theatre to act in Alan Bennett's The History Boys. The National Theatre production later toured the world, affording Knott his Broadway debut. He reprised his role on BBC radio, and in Bennett's film adaptation which was directed by the National's Nicholas Hytner. In 2011, he appeared in "The National Anthem", an episode of the anthology series Black Mirror. Knott later appeared in the TV series Drop Dead Gorgeous and Gavin & Stacey, and the BBC 3 drama series Spooks: Code 9 as Rob.

== Filmography ==
=== Television ===
| Year | Title | Role | Notes |
|---|---|---|---|
| 1995 | Cracker | Joe Harvey | 2 episodes |
| 1996 | Emmerdale | Darryl | 3 episodes |
| 1996 | Children's Ward | Steve | |
| 1997–2001 | Where the Heart Is | Henry Green | |
| 1997 | Police 2020 | Scully | Pilot |
| 1997 | Coronation Street | Liam Shepherd | 2 episodes |
| 1998 | Heartbeat | Billy Fawsley | 1 episode |
| 1998 | Casualty | Garth | 1 episode |
| 2000 | Peak Practice | Steve | 1 episode |
| 2003 | Casualty | Ed | 1 episode |
| 2003 | The Bill | Colin McGuire | 1 episode |
| 2006 | Life on Mars | Derek Bannister | 1 episode |
| 2007 | Drop Dead Gorgeous | Ben McIntyre | |
| 2007–2009, 2024 | Gavin & Stacey | Dirtbox | 4 episodes |
| 2008 | Lewis | Ryan Gallen | 1 episode |
| 2008 | Spooks: Code 9 | Rob Sullivan | |
| 2011 | Frankenstein's Wedding | Henry | |
| 2011 | Waterloo Road | Greg Barrington | 1 episode |
| 2011 | Black Mirror | Brian | 1 episode |
| 2014 | Father Brown | Peter Royce | 1 episode |
| 2014 | Casualty | John Cunningham | 1 episode |
| 2015 | Banana | Eddie | 1 episode |
| 2016 | Casualty | Vince Callaghan | 4 episodes |
| 2016 | Grantchester | Sam Milburn | 2 episodes |
| 2017 | No Offence | Freddie Dobson | 1 episode |
| 2018 | Midsomer Murders | Mostyn Cartwright | 1 episode |
| 2018 | Strangers | Conrad Davies | 3 episodes |
| 2019 | Silent Witness | Nick Marlow | 1 episode |
| 2020 | Brave New World | Dario | 1 episode |
| 2021 | Leonardo | Alfonso | 2 episodes |
| 2021 | Time | Alexander Doyle | 1 episode |
| 2022 | Ackley Bridge | Dean Dobson | 7 episodes |
| 2022 | The Walk-In | Kevin | 1 episode |
| 2023 | Maryland | Jim | |
| 2024 | Protection | DI Richard Bewley | 6 episodes |
| 2026 | Adultery | Dave | |

=== Film ===
| Year | Title | Role | Notes |
|---|---|---|---|
| 1993 | The Secret Garden | Dickon | Nominated – Young Artist Award for Best Youth Actor Leading Role in a Motion Picture |
| 1994 | Black Beauty | Joe Green | |
| 2006 | The History Boys | Lockwood | |
| 2007 | The Sickhouse | Steve | |
| 2009 | Cotton Stones | Rob Mally | Short film |
| 2010 | In Our Name | Paul | |
| 2010 | Sex & Drugs & Rock & Roll | Reporter | |
| 2012 | Spike Island | Voodoo Ray | |
| 2014 | The Unbeatables | Beville Beville/Beville | Voice, UK version |
| 2015 | The Lady in the Van | Ambulance Man | |
| 2017 | My Cousin Rachel | Joshua | |

=== Theatre ===
| Year | Title | Role | Venue | Notes |
|---|---|---|---|---|
| 2004–2006 | The History Boys | Lockwood | Lyttelton Theatre, Royal National Theatre, South Bank (2004–2005); Lyric Theatre, The Hong Kong Academy for Performing Arts (2006); St. James Theatre, Wellington (2006); Sydney Theatre, Sydney (2006); Broadhurst Theatre, Broadway (2006) | |
| 2010–2013 | Backbeat | John Lennon | Citizens Theatre, Glasgow (2010); Duke of York's Theatre, London (2011); Royal Alexandra Theatre, Toronto, Canada (2012); Ahmanson Theatre, Los Angeles (2013) | Based on the 1994 film of the same name |

=== Radio ===
| Year | Title | Role | Station | Notes |
|---|---|---|---|---|
| 2000 | Stockport... So Good They Named It Once | Jason | BBC Radio 7 | Series 2 |
| 2002 | Fat Camp | Josh | BBC Radio 4 | |

== Awards and nominations ==
| Year | Award | Category | Title of work | Result |
|---|---|---|---|---|
| 1994 | Young Artist Award | Best Youth Actor Leading Role in a Motion Picture Drama | The Secret Garden as Dickon | Nominated |
