= Helen Russell-Clark =

British actress

- Born: 1987 or 1988 (age 38–39); Manchester, England, United Kingdom
- Occupations: Actress; Yoga teacher
- Television: Hollyoaks

Helen Russell-Clark (born 1987 or 1988) is a British actress. She was born in Manchester and grew up in Romsey, later graduating from the Guildford School of Acting. After appearing in stage productions and fight films, Russell-Clark portrayed regular character Jem Costello in the British soap Hollyoaks in 2010, which she enjoyed. Since leaving the soap, she has made guest appearances in Doctors, Casualty, Missing Something, Episodes, The Five, and Hospital People. The actress has also had careers in hospitality and yoga teaching and has gone into academia.

== Life and career ==
Helen Russell-Clark was born in 1987 or 1988 in Manchester and grew up in Romsey. Her father is from Liverpool whilst her mother is from Hong Kong. As a child, Russell-Clark did gymnastics. She trained and graduated from a three-year course at the Guildford School of Acting in 2008 and worked as an actress for her first career. The actress did a lot of stage combat and was part of a few fight films and hoped to use her martial arts training for future projects. She was also part of a all-female theatre company, which she had to leave, and did several theatre projects.

In 2010, Russell-Clark joined the cast of the British soap opera Hollyoaks as Jem Costello, the new girlfriend of established character Gilly Roach (Anthony Quinlan). The actress was brought under executive producer Lucy Allan and made her debut in episodes airing in March 2010. Russell-Clark initially was on a six-month contract for the role. Russell-Clark had initially auditioned several times for the role of Rae Wilson (Alice Barlow) but was later cast as Jem, who Russell-Clark described as being honest, mysterious, straightforward and a "good, fun, lively character" that was into Martials arts. Jem's dress style was based on the Russell-Clark. The actress enjoyed joining the soap and described it as "a big family". She added, "I can't tell you how lovely everyone is. I was very surprised just how genuinely lovely they were, because I would have thought people who have been in the limelight so much wouldn't have too much time for me, and I guess you just get stereotypes of people, but they've been so welcoming and generous". Russell-Clark had been skydiving when she received the call telling her that she had won the role, with Russell-Clark reminiscing, "I literally thought I was going to have a heart attack because I was so buzzed! I was really happy".

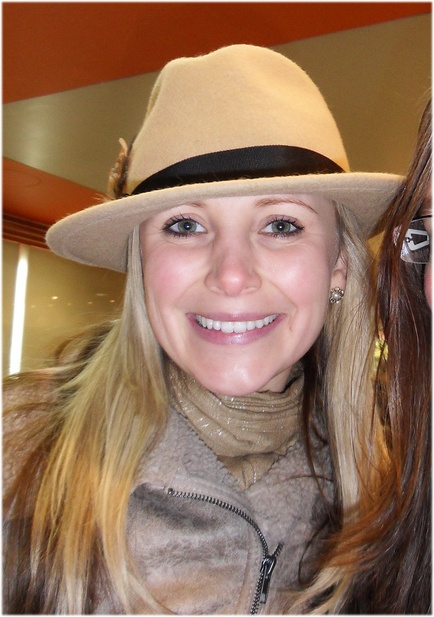
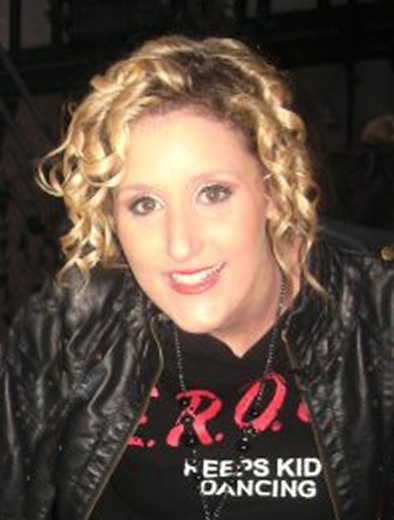
Russell-Clark temporarily lived her two Hollyoaks colleagues, Carly Stenson (left) and Bronagh Waugh (right).

Russell-Clark's character, Jem, initially moves from Thailand to Hollyoaks village with Gilly offscreen; Russell-Clark asked producers to go to Thailand to film but they were not keen on the idea. Jem's initial storylines sees her romance with Gilly and a love quadrangle with Gilly, Steph Cunningham (Carley Stenson) and Cheryl Brady (Bronagh Waugh); offscreen, Russell-Clark became good friends with Waugh and Stenson and she stayed at their flat whilst she was looking for a place to live, with Russell-Clark calling the pair her "life savers". Waugh and Claire Cooper (Jacqui McQueen) had also gone to the Guildford School of Acting. Russell-Clark also became friends with several other cast members and would often pop over to see the ones that she lived in the same neighbourhood with. Hollyoaks's new executive producer Paul Marquess later introduced Jem's paternal family. Jem's other storylines included her relationship with Gilly and the love triangle with Steph, her unhappy relationship with her father Carl Costello (Paul Opacic), her reunion with her paternal family, her relationship with Ravi Roy (Stephen Uppal) and planning revenge on Carl to get rid of him. Russell-Clark later left the soap and last appeared in November 2010.

Russell-Clark portrayed Katie Logan in an episode of the BBC soap opera Doctors, which was broadcast on 5 November 2012. She then had another guest role as Jade Murray in the 28th series of the medical drama Casualty, which was broadcast on 5 October 2013. That same year, she appeared in the web series Missing Something. In 2015, she guest-starred in an episode of the 4th series of the sitcom Episodes. In 2016, she guest-starred in the final episode of The Five, and the following year she appeared in the premiere episode of the British mockumentary series Hospital People.

The actress also worked in hospitality as her second career. She later went into academia. Russell-Clark completed an MA in Psychoanalysis at the Tavistock and Portman NHS Foundation Trust and did her preliminary psychotherapy and philosophy training at the Philadelphia Association. Russell-Clark is also a yoga teacher. She first did a 200-hour training in Morocco followed by further trainings, including with The Yoga People. Russell-Clark has noted "Yoga found me in my early twenties. It was a necessity to escape a busy London life- an hour or so a day of peace and clarity, my moving meditation". She also completed her Rocket Yoga instruction training in London and Barcelona and has since assisted in the trainings.

== Personal life ==
Russell-Clark is from Southampton. She lives and teaches yoga in London, having moved there in her 20s. She also enjoys martials arts and did training for it, including specialist courses during her degree, which was also a substantial part of her Hollyoaks character's characterisation. The actress said in a 2010 interview that she wanted to travel more and wanted to go to South-east Asia. That same year, she said that she was dating actor Greg Newton, whom she met at Guildford School of Acting.

== Filmography ==
Year	Title	Role	Notes	Ref.
2010	Hollyoaks	Jem Costello	Regular role	
2012	Doctors	Katie Logan	1 episode ("Ink")	
2013	Missing Something	Anna	Web series	
2013	Casualty	Jade Murray	1 episode ("Love Hurts")	
2015	Episodes	Gifting Suite Woman	1 episode (Series 4, episode 3)	
2016	The Five	Gifting Suite Woman	1 episode ("Episode 10")	
2017	Hospital People	Elderly Patient	1 episode ("The Hospital Awards")	
