= Caroline Thompson =

American writer

- Born: April 23, 1956 (age 70); Washington, D.C., U.S.
- Education: Radcliffe College; Amherst College
- Occupations: Novelist; Screenwriter; Director; Producer
- Spouses: Henry Bromell (1982–85); Steve Nicolaides (?–present)

Caroline Thompson (born April 23, 1956) is an American novelist, screenwriter, film director, and producer. She wrote the screenplays for the Tim Burton-directed films Edward Scissorhands and Corpse Bride and the Burton-produced The Nightmare Before Christmas. She co-wrote the story for Edward Scissorhands and co-adapted a new stage version of the film with director and choreographer Matthew Bourne. Thompson also adapted the screenplay for the film version of Wicked Lovely, a bestselling fantasy series, in 2011, but the production was put into turnaround. She directed Black Beauty (1994); Buddy (1997), which she also wrote; and the television film Snow White: The Fairest of Them All (2001), also as producer and co-writer.

== Early life and education ==
Thompson was born in Washington, D.C., the daughter of Bettie Marshall (née Warner), a teacher, and Thomas Carlton Thompson, Jr., a lawyer. She received her early education in Washington. She later moved to Cambridge, Massachusetts, to attend Radcliffe College, and eventually graduated from Amherst College in 1978 with a degree in English and classic literature.

== Career ==
Thompson moved to Los Angeles, supporting herself as a freelance book reviewer and writer. In 1983, she published a novel First Born which director Penelope Spheeris chose to adapt into a film, and from whom she started learning scriptwriting while writing the drafts of the film's screenplay. Though the movie was never made, the project inspired her to pursue a career as a screenwriter. Tim Burton was impressed with the novel, which was "about a monster fetus". He felt First Born had the same psychological elements he wanted to showcase in Edward Scissorhands, and hired her to write its screenplay as a spec script.

Her other works include Snow White: The Fairest of Them All, The Secret Garden, Buddy, Black Beauty, Homeward Bound: The Incredible Journey, and The Addams Family. Though she is best known for having written the screenplays for Edward Scissorhands and The Nightmare Before Christmas, she has had more than a dozen movies made, including City of Ember and The Addams Family.

From the above, she directed Black Beauty (1994) as her directorial debut, followed by Snow White in 2001 for TV and Buddy. She was the producer for Snow White and the associate producer for The Secret Garden and Edward Scissorhands.

Her screenplay for Wicked Lovely, intended to be directed by Mary Harron, was in turnaround in 2011.

Thompson was the first woman to be presented with the Distinguished Screenwriter Award at the 2011 Austin Film Festival.

== Personal life ==
Her first marriage was to Henry Bromell, a fellow novelist and screenwriter. She later married Steve Nicolaides, a film and TV producer.

== Filmography ==
Year	Title	Director	Writer	Producer
1990	Edward Scissorhands	No	Yes	Associate
1991	The Addams Family	No	Yes	No
1993	Homeward Bound: The Incredible Journey	No	Yes	No
1993	The Secret Garden	No	Yes	Associate
1993	The Nightmare Before Christmas	No	Yes	No
1994	Black Beauty	Yes	Yes	No
1997	Buddy	Yes	Yes	No
2001	Snow White: The Fairest of Them All	Yes	Yes	Yes
2005	Corpse Bride	No	Yes	No
2008	City of Ember	No	Yes	No
2018	Welcome to Marwen	No	Yes	No

As herself

- Prop Culture (2020) episode: "Tim Burton's The Nightmare Before Christmas"
- The Holiday Movies That Made Us (2020) episode: "Nightmare Before Christmas"

== Bibliography ==
- First born, Published by Coward-McCann, 1983. ISBN 0-698-11224-5.
- Edward Scissorhands, by Thompson & Tim Burton. Published by distributed by Cinestore, 1990.
- The Secret Garden, Adapted by Thompson. Published by s.n., 1991.
- The Addams Family: A Novelization, by Elizabeth Faucher, Thompson, & Larry Wilson. Published by Scholastic Inc., 1991. ISBN 0-590-45541-9.
- Tim Burton's Nightmare Before Christmas: A Novel, by Daphne Skinner, Thompson, Michael McDowell, & Tim Burton. Published by Puffin Books, 1994. ISBN 0-14-037121-4.
- Snow White, by Thompson & Julie Hickson. Published by s.n, 2000.
- Tim Burton's Nightmare Before Christmas: The Film, the Art, the Vision, by Frank Thompson, Tim Burton. Published by Disney Editions, 2002. ISBN 0-7868-5378-6. Caroline Thompson – Page 179.
- Salisbury, Mark; Burton, Tim (2006). Burton on Burton. Faber and Faber. ISBN 0-571-22926-3.
