= Salvage (2009 film) =

- DVD cover
- Directed by: Lawrence Gough
- Written by: Colin O'Donnell; Alan Pattison
- Produced by: Julie Lau
- Starring: Neve McIntosh; Shaun Dooley; Linzey Cocker
- Music by: Stephen Hilton
- Release dates: 21 June 2009 (Edinburgh Film Festival); 2 March 2010 (United Kingdom)
- Running time: 79 minutes
- Country: United Kingdom
- Language: English

Salvage is a 2009 British horror film directed by Lawrence Gough, produced by Julie Lau and written by Colin O'Donnell and Alan Pattison. The film stars Neve McIntosh, Shaun Dooley and Linzey Cocker as residents in a suburban street who find themselves isolated from the outside world following an emergency. The film was one of three produced in Liverpool to celebrate the city's status as EU City of Culture in 2008, and was filmed on the set of former soap opera Brookside. It was produced on a minimal budget, and was the last time the Brookside set was used for filming purposes before it was sold to a private developer. Neve McIntosh won two Best Actress awards for her role in the film.

== Plot ==
On Christmas Eve morning, a paperboy delivers newspapers in a cul-de-sac. Hearing a row between an Indian couple, he peers through the window, but is spotted and chased away by the man, Mr Sharma (Shahid Ahmed). He flees into the woods behind the street, but is killed by an unknown assailant.

Jodie (Linzey Cocker) is dropped off by her father Clive (Dean Andrews) at her mother's house in the same cul-de-sac to stay for Christmas. Jodie is reluctant as she does not get on with her mother. She finds her mother, Beth (Neve McIntosh) in her room having sex with Kieran (Shaun Dooley). Disgusted, Jodie storms out and stays at her friend Leanne's (Jessica Baglow) house across the street, despite Beth's pleas. Beth argues with Lianne's mother Pam (Debbie Rush), but Pam will not let her in to see Jodie.

As Beth stands in front of Leanne's house, a team of special forces soldiers appear and order everyone inside. Mr Sharma emerges from his house covered in blood and armed with a knife. As he advances towards the soldiers, he is shot dead. Beth gets back into her house with Kieran and the two hear gunfire outside. A television news report shows a shipping container washed up on a nearby beach. Three bodies were found near it, and another further inland, but the power cuts out before they can learn more.

A man breaks into the house and attacks them, and after a struggle Kieran kills him. The man turns out to be Beth's next-door neighbour Peter Davis (Alan Pattison), who had smashed his way in through the communal wall between their lofts. Beth and Kieran enter Peter's house, finding the place in chaos and his wife Joanne dead. Pam bangs on the door shouting for help, but before they can let her in she is dragged away and killed.

The two see the body of a soldier in Peter's garden and get out to retrieve his radio. The soldier turns out to be alive. They carry the soldier, Akede (Kevin Harvey), inside and tend to his wound. Akede reveals that Mr. Sharma was an al-Qaeda terrorist and the shipping container contained weapons for a terrorist operation. Later, Beth hears Akede talking on his radio saying his team were killed by a creature. As she confronts him, he tells her that the true cause of the chaos is due to an experiment to create a creature to be used as a weapon. It was being carried away for destruction by a helicopter, but the helicopter went down in the sea. The shipping container containing the creature washed up on the beach, and was opened by three drunk teenagers. It killed them and escaped.

At this point the creature appears at the window and starts to force its way in. Beth flees into the loft, but Kieran is dragged down before he can climb up. Beth gets back to her house, but the sergeant major commanding the special forces team (Ray Nicholas) is waiting for her and knocks her unconscious.

Beth wakes up and finds herself tied up and gagged outside, presumably to act as bait. Kieran, badly wounded but still alive, appears and unties her. They attempt to flee, but run into the sergeant major, who stabs Kieran to death. Beth flees into the woods, pursued by the soldiers, and finds the paperboy's body. The creature appears, but does not notice her, and attacks the soldiers.

Beth goes to Leanne's house to find her daughter. She finds Leanne, who tells her that Jodie has gone home. Beth flees the house, narrowly avoiding the soldiers; brief screams and a gunshot are heard inside, implying that Leanne is killed. Back at her house, Beth finds Jodie, but they are attacked by the creature. Beth manages to stab it to death as it attacks Jodie, but as she stands up and screams in triumph she is shot dead by one of the soldiers. Jodie tries to help her mother while the soldiers freeze in shock.

== Cast ==
- Neve McIntosh as Beth
- Shaun Dooley as Kieran
- Linzey Cocker as Jodie
- Dean Andrews as Clive
- Debbie Rush as Pam
- Jessica Baglow as Leanne
- Kevin Harvey as Akede
- Ray Nicholas as the Sergeant Major
- Paul Opacic as Corporal Simms
- Ben Batt as Trooper Jones
- Alan Pattison as Peter Davis
- Shahid Ahmed as Mr Sharma
- Sufian Ashraf as Mrs Sharma
- Jake Norton as Newsreader
- Kyle Ward as Paperboy
- Martin Pemberton and Paul Howell as Soldiers

== Production ==
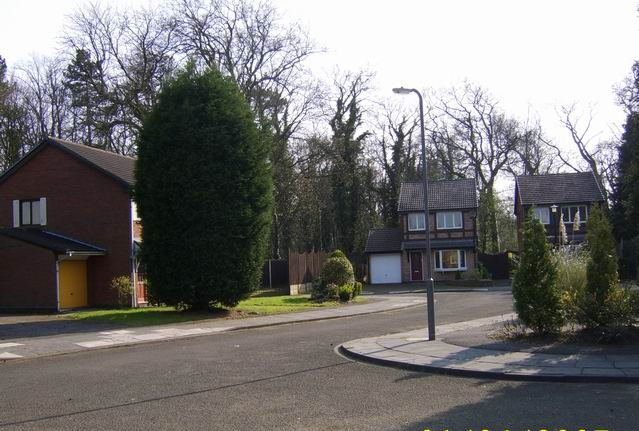
The Brookside set, seen here in 2007, was the setting for Salvage.

Salvage was one of three films produced celebrating Liverpool culture to coincide with the city's status of EU City of Culture in 2008. It was directed by Lawrence Gough.

Filming for Salvage had begun by March 2008, when the Liverpool Daily Post reported that the set of Brookside Close had been rented to a local production company to use as a production set. The production was a low-budget production titled Salvage. This was the last time the houses of the Brookside set were ever used for production purposes. It was sold to a private developer months later.

== Release and reception ==
The film received modest reviews following its release, and was not widely distributed. Despite the best efforts of the set designers, some reviewers did comment on its similarity to Brookside Close. Giving it three out of five stars, the magazine Time Out observed that the film had made clever use of the set.

The film, which marked Lawrence Gough's directing debut, won Neve McIntosh an International Fantasy Film Award for Best Actress in 2010, as well as the Award for Best Horror Actress at the Fantastic Fest.
