= Debbie Rush =

English actress (born 1966)

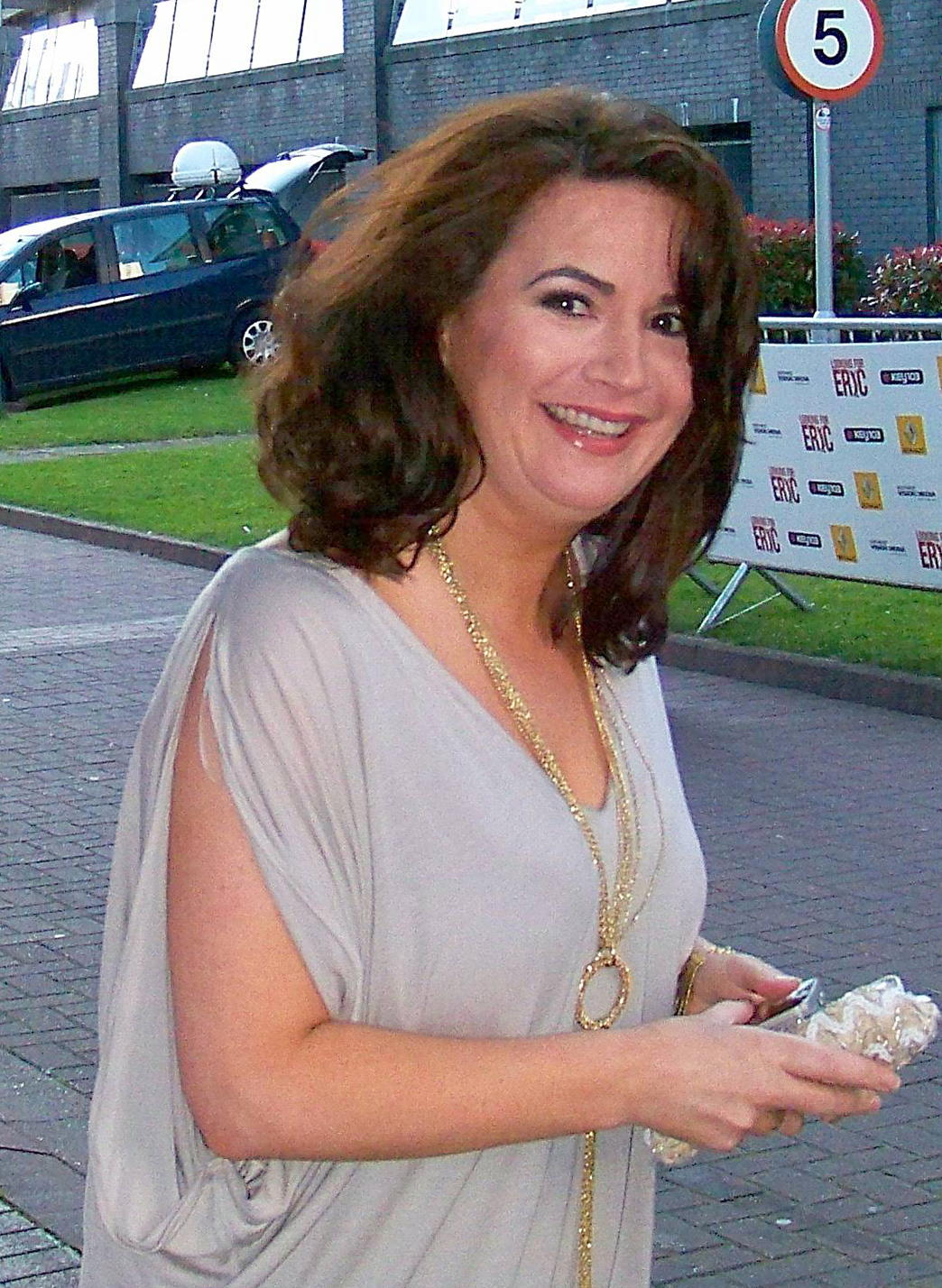
- Rush in 2009
- Born: Debra Ann Smith; 29 March 1966 (age 60); Castleton, Derbyshire, England
- Occupation: Actress
- Spouse: Andrew Rush (m. 1989)
- Children: 3; including William and Poppy

Debbie Rush (born 29 March 1966) is an English actress, known for playing Anna Windass in the ITV soap opera Coronation Street from 2008 to 2018.

== Career ==
=== Early career ===
After training at the Manchester School of Acting when she was in her thirties, she has also starred in Shameless, Brookside and Hollyoaks in the City. Rush also filmed the role of Pam in the horror film Salvage alongside Neve McIntosh.

=== Coronation Street ===
In 2008, Rush was cast in soap opera Coronation Street as Anna Windass. She won the part over a number of highly rated actors. Of this Rush said: "I went for the casting a few months ago and then was called back for the screen test. When I got the part I couldn’t believe it, I was thrilled to bits. I watched Corrie all the time growing up and all the family are tuning in now that I’m going to be in it. It’s surreal, because the cast and characters are already part of your life just from watching it." In March 2015, Rush was nominated in the category of "Best Actress" at the 2015 British Soap Awards.

Rush announced her decision to leave the series in July 2017 and Anna departed in the episode first broadcast on 22 January 2018. She appeared in two further episodes first broadcast on 31 May to 1 June 2018.

=== Further roles ===
Since leaving Coronation Street, Rush appeared in Sky One original Brassic for two episodes in 2019 and another in 2021 and alongside Steve Pemberton and Reece Shearsmith in series 5 of BBC One anthology series Inside No. 9.

=== Other ventures ===
In December 2010, Rush released her own fitness DVD, Debbie Rush's Bulge Buster Workout.

== Personal life ==
Rush and husband Andrew have three children, Tom, Poppy and William. On 17 December 2025, her son William died, aged 31.

== Filmography ==
Year	Title	Type	Role	Notes
2006	Hollyoaks: In the City	Television	Mrs. Jones	2 episodes
2007	The Street	Television	Mother of Disabled Child	Series 2, episode 2
2008	Shameless	Television	Nice Woman	Series 5, episode 11
2008	Florence Nightingale	Film	Nurse Interviewee	Drama film
2008–2018	Coronation Street	Television	Anna Windass	1,059 episodes
2009	Salvage	Film	Pam	Horror film
2010	Tram Crash News Flash	Online	Anna Windass	Online spin-off; 1 episode
2013	Lemon La Vida Loca	Television	Herself	Series 2, episode 6
2014	All Star Family Fortunes	Television	Herself	2 episodes
2014	All Star Mr & Mrs	Television	Herself	Series 6, episode 8
2019, 2021, 2023	Brassic	Television	Daffne Bishop	4 episodes
2020	Inside No. 9	Television	Julia	Episode: "Love's Great Adventure"
2025	Daddy Issues	Television	Sue	Episode: "We Don't Like Sigmas"
