= The Secret Garden (1993 film) =

1993 film by Agnieszka Holland

- Theatrical release poster
- Directed by: Agnieszka Holland
- Screenplay by: Caroline Thompson
- Based on: The Secret Garden; 1911 novel by Frances Hodgson Burnett
- Produced by: Fred Fuchs; Tom Luddy; Fred Roos
- Starring: Kate Maberly; Heydon Prowse; Andrew Knott; Maggie Smith
- Cinematography: Roger Deakins
- Edited by: Isabelle Lorente
- Music by: Zbigniew Preisner
- Production company: American Zoetrope
- Distributed by: Warner Bros.
- Release dates: 13 August 1993 (United States); 20 January 1994 (United Kingdom)
- Running time: 101 minutes
- Countries: United States; United Kingdom; Poland
- Language: English
- Budget: $18 million
- Box office: $40 million

The Secret Garden is a 1993 fantasy drama film directed by Agnieszka Holland, executive-produced by Francis Ford Coppola and distributed by Warner Bros. under their Family Entertainment imprint. Starring Kate Maberly, Heydon Prowse, Andrew Knott and Maggie Smith, the film's screenplay was written by Caroline Thompson, based on the 1911 novel of the same name by Frances Hodgson Burnett. It also marked the film debuts for Maberly, Prowse and Knott. The novel was previously adapted in 1919 and 1949.

Set in the Yorkshire Moors in northern England, Yorkshire's Allerton Castle was used for most of the exterior shots of Misselthwaite Manor (the primary location of the entire story), as well as the interior shots. The film was critically and commercially successful, grossing around $40 million worldwide. Dame Maggie Smith was nominated for the BAFTA Award for Best Actress in a Supporting Role, and young lead actress Kate Maberly received a "Special Achievement Award For Outstanding Performance" at the 1994 London Critics Circle Film Awards. At the 1993 Los Angeles Film Critics Association Awards, the film's composer, Zbigniew Preisner, won "Best Music" for the film's score. The film also features a song performed by Linda Ronstadt, called "Winter Light", which plays as the credits roll; the song features lyrics set to one of Preisner's orchestral themes ("Awakening of Spring") in the film. In 2005, the British Film Institute included it in their list of the "50 films you should see by the age of 14".

== Plot ==
In 1901, recently orphaned 10-year-old Mary Lennox is sent from her home in British India to her uncle Lord Archibald Craven's mansion, Misselthwaite Manor, in Yorkshire, England. She was unloved and neglected by her parents, who were killed by an earthquake in India. As a result, Mary is cold, self-centered and so repressed that she is unable to cry.

Head housekeeper Mrs. Medlock informs Mary that her uncle, who spends most of his time away, will likely not see her. Mary hears strange sounds of crying in the house and discovers a hidden door in her room that leads to uninhabited areas, including her aunt's old room. There, she discovers a large key. Mrs. Medlock continuously sends Mary to play out on the grounds to keep her occupied whenever the crying starts in the house. Mary discovers her late Aunt Lilias' walled garden, which has been locked up since her death 10 years prior. She realizes that the key she found earlier unlocks the garden but keeps it a secret. She befriends Dickon Sowerby, the younger brother of the manor's housemaid, Martha. Dickon is an outdoorsy boy who is good with animals. Mary and Dickon slowly clean up the secret garden, and Mary becomes happier. She also finally meets her uncle, who is sullen but kind.

Hidden away in the mansion is Lord Craven's son and Mary's cousin, Colin Craven, who has been treated like a sickly invalid his entire life. A spoiled, short-tempered boy, he has never left his room nor ever walked and is confined to his bed or uses a wheelchair. His father barely comes to see him in fear that Colin will die soon and he will lose his son. Mary eventually discovers Colin, learning that he was the source of the crying in the house. Although taken aback by his difficult nature, she puts her foot down and refuses to give in to his whims, showing him that he is not really sick. Encouraged by Mary, Colin goes outside for the first time, and Mary and Dickon take him to the secret garden.

The three children grow close and spend their free time in the garden every day, where Colin, with their help, learns to walk. The trio keep all of this a secret from the staff. Colin wants his father to be the first one to see him on his legs. Lord Craven has a dream of his late wife Lilias calling to him and returns home. In the secret garden, he sees Colin walking for the first time, leaving him speechless with joy.

Mary bursts into tears for the first time in her life, certain that she is unwanted by her uncle and the garden will be locked up again as he had ordered it to be. Lord Craven reassures her that she is now part of the family. Promising never to lock it up again, he thanks her for bringing his family back to life. Dickon informs his older sister and the rest of the manor staff of the good news. The staff watch in shock and joy as Lord Craven and the children come home together.

== Cast ==
- Kate Maberly as Mary Lennox
- Heydon Prowse as Colin Craven, Lord Craven's son and Mary's cousin
- Andrew Knott as Dickon Sowerby, Martha's younger brother
- Laura Crossley as Martha Sowerby, Mary's maid, Dickon's older sister and Mrs Medlock's servant
- John Lynch as Lord Archibald Craven, Colin's father, Mary's uncle, and Lilias’ husband
- Maggie Smith as Mrs. Medlock, the housekeeper of Misselthwaite Manor and Lord Craven's servant
- Irène Jacob as Mrs. Lennox/Lilias Craven
- Peter Moreton as Will
- Colin Bruce as Major Lennox
- Walter Sparrow as Ben Weatherstaff, the gardener

== Production ==
=== Casting ===
Heydon Prowse stated that American actor Elijah Wood auditioned for the role of Colin Craven before he won the role during an interview with Danyah Miller on July 23, 2021. American actress Kirsten Dunst auditioned for the role of Mary Lennox.

=== Filming locations ===
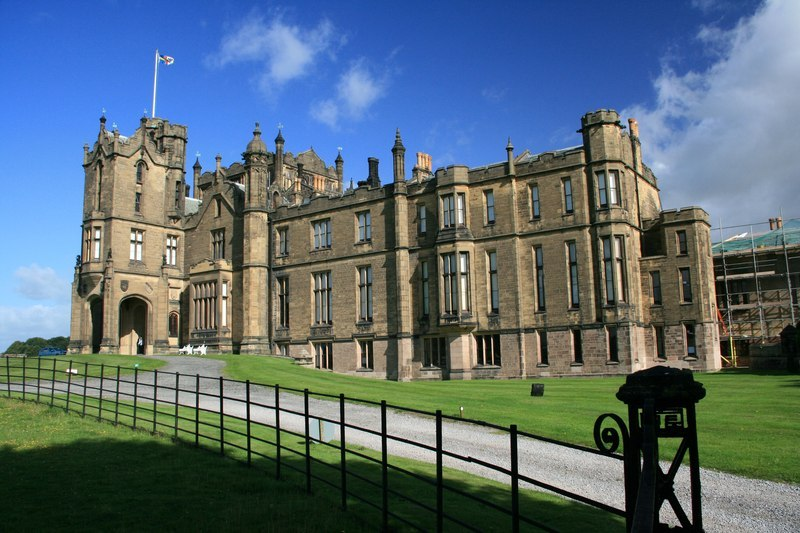
Exterior of Allerton Castle in Yorkshire, northern England

Yorkshire's imposing Allerton Castle was used for most of the exterior shots of Misselthwaite Manor, and some of the interior was also used. Fountains Hall was also used for part of the exterior. Interiors of the former Midland Grand Hotel in London were used for filming as well, notably the scenes on the grand staircase.

== Soundtrack ==
The film features the end credits song "Winter Light" performed by Linda Ronstadt, which is based on two themes from the score by Zbigniew Preisner. However, this song was not included in the film's original soundtrack release, but was in Ronstadt's eponymous album Winter Light. Sarah Brightman and the youngest member of Celtic Woman, Chloë Agnew, covered it for their albums Classics and Walking In The Air respectively. The soundtrack, released by Varèse Sarabande, contains the original score.

== Release ==
The film was released in the United States and Canada on 13 August 1993. It grossed $31.2 million in the US and Canada. Internationally, it grossed $8.8 million for a worldwide total of $40 million.

=== Critical reception ===
Since its 1993 release, the film has garnered positive reviews. The Secret Garden has an approval rating of 89% on review aggregator website Rotten Tomatoes, based on 44 reviews, and an average rating of 7.9/10. The site's critics consensus reads, "The Secret Garden honors its classic source material with a well-acted, beautifully filmed adaptation that doesn't shy from its story's darker themes". On Metacritic, the film has a weighted average score of 74 out of 100 based on 26 critics, indicating "generally favorable reviews". Audiences polled by CinemaScore gave the film an average grade of "A" on an A+ to F scale.

Roger Ebert gave the film 4 out of 4 stars, calling it "a work of beauty, poetry and deep mystery, and watching it is like entering for a time into a closed world where one's destiny may be discovered." Desson Thomson of The Washington Post praised the acting by young actors, calling their acts "quite proficient and un-sappy too", but adding, "it's not their fault if they too often seem like chessmen being moved around on the director's board, composed into picturesque tableaux". Todd McCarthy of Variety wrote that "[the film is] executed to near perfection in all artistic departments", and called it "[a] superior adaptation", mentioning that "[the adaptation] of the perennial favorite novel will find its core public among girls, but should prove satisfying enough to a range of audiences".

Owen Gleiberman of Entertainment Weekly gave the film a "C+" and called it "earnest, heartfelt, and, for all its lavishness, rather plodding". Janet Maslin of The New York Times called this new adaptation of The Secret Garden "[an] elegantly expressive, a discreet and lovely rendering of the children's classic by Frances Hodgson Burnett".

Trevor Johnston of Time Out said that "With well-judged performances played straight, and topical subtexts (Green consciousness, the dysfunctional family), this 'children's' film sets no age limit on its potential audience".

=== Awards and nominations ===
Award	Date of ceremony	Category	Recipient(s)	Result	Ref.
BAFTA Awards	15 April 1994	Best Actress in a Supporting Role	Maggie Smith	Nominated	
Evening Standard British Film Awards	1993	Best Technical or Artistic Achievement	Stuart Craig	Won	
London Film Critics' Circle	1994	Special Achievement Award	Kate Maberly	Won	
Los Angeles Film Critics Association	11 December 1993	Best Music Score	Zbigniew Preisner (also for Three Colors: Blue and Olivier, Olivier)	Won	
Political Film Society Award for Democracy	1993	Political Film Society Award for Democracy	The Secret Garden	Nominated	
Young Artist Awards	5 February 1994	Outstanding Family Motion Picture: Drama	The Secret Garden	Nominated	
Young Artist Awards	5 February 1994	Best Youth Actress Leading Role in a Motion Picture: Drama	Kate Maberly	Nominated	
Young Artist Awards	5 February 1994	Best Youth Actor Leading Role in a Motion Picture: Drama	Andrew Knott	Nominated	
Young Artist Awards	5 February 1994	Best Youth Actor Leading Role in a Motion Picture: Drama	Heydon Prowse	Nominated	

=== Home media ===
The Secret Garden was released on VHS and LaserDisc in the United States on 15 February 1994. It was originally released on VHS in the UK on 1 August 1994 and was re-released on 15 December 1997 by Warner Home Video. The DVD was released by Warner Home Video in 2005.

== Bibliography ==
- Wolf, Matt (8 August 1993). "Film; 'The Secret Garden' and How It Grew". The New York Times. p. 11.
