= Linzey Cocker =

English actress (born 1987)

- Born: Linzey Louise Cocker; 19 May 1987 (age 39); Salford, Greater Manchester, England
- Occupation: Actress
- Years active: 2004–2020
- Spouse: Adam Tse
- Children: 3

Linzey Louise Cocker (born 19 May 1987) is an English actress best known for playing Sam Swan in the hit BBC comedy White Gold starring Ed Westwick and Joe Thomas. She also played alongside Michelle Keegan as her sister Marie Lane in BBC drama Our Girl, Jade Webb in the BBC Three comedy-drama series Drop Dead Gorgeous, Josie in the 2008 film Wild Child, and Jess Fisher in Waterloo Road.

== Early years ==
Cocker went to Wentworth High School (now Ellesmere Park High School) in Eccles, Greater Manchester.

== Career ==
In Drop Dead Gorgeous, Cocker's character is the fraternal twin of Ashley Webb. Jade, being the popular and charismatic sister, finds it difficult to adjust to her shy sister's rapid success as a model, when Jade has always wanted to be a model herself so when her sister was offered a modeling job it changed their family's life and most of all Jade's life.

She also appeared in the films Wild Child along with actress Emma Roberts and Enemies Closer alongside Jean-Claude Van Damme.

Cocker also performed in a BBC drama series, Waterloo Road, playing new pupil Jess Fisher, alongside former Silent Witness actress Amanda Burton who plays her on-screen mother and new headteacher, Karen Fisher.

Cocker also played Sam Swan in a BBC comedy drama White Gold.

In 2016, she played the role of Marie in the BBC One drama series Our Girl, where she played the role of Georgie Lane's sister and later the wife/widow of Fingers. She played the role until series end in 2020.

== Filmography ==
Film
Year	Title	Role
2008	Clash of the Santas	Brooke
2008	Wild Child	Josie
2008	Is Anybody There?	Tanya
2009	Salvage	Jodie
2010	4.3.2.1.	Gwen
2010	McQueen	Becky
2013	Enemies Closer	Kayla

Television
Year	Title	Role
2004	Conviction	Miriam Payne
2006	Drop Dead Gorgeous	Jade Webb
2006	Shameless	Zadie
2006	The Innocence Project	Rhiannan Hayes
2006	Northern Lights	Brooke Armstrong
2006	The Street	Leanne McEvoy
2007	City Lights	Brooke Armstrong/Sarah Shearer
2010–2011	Waterloo Road	Jess Fisher
2012	Leaving	Kelly
2014	In the Flesh	Haley
2015	The Musketeers	Jeanne (episode 2.5 "The Return")
2016–2020	Our Girl	Marie Lane
2017	Tina and Bobby (mini-series)	Kathy Peters
2017–2019	White Gold	Sam Swan
