= Beth Clement =

Fictional character from Hollyoaks

- Hollyoaks character
- Portrayed by: Sinéad Moynihan
- Duration: 2007–2008
- First appearance: 5 October 2007
- Last appearance: 18 April 2008
- Created by: Bryan Kirkwood
In-universe information
- Occupation: Student
- Family: Ashworth
- Father: Noel Ashworth
- Mother: Mary Clement
- Half-brothers: Rhys Ashworth
- Grandfathers: Bill Ashworth
- Uncles: Neville Ashworth
- First cousins: Hannah Ashworth; Josh Ashworth

Beth Clement is a fictional character from British Channel 4 soap opera Hollyoaks, played by Sinéad Moynihan. Beth first appeared as a student at Hollyoaks Community College, studying for a nursing degree and was later involved in an accidental incest storyline with her half-brother, Rhys Ashworth (Andrew Moss). Beth died in a car crash on 18 April 2008.

== Character creation ==
The character of Beth was introduced in November 2007, played by Sinéad Moynihan, as a love interest for established character Rhys Ashworth (Andrew Moss). It was revealed that the character would discover she is the half-sister of Rhys, starting an incestuous relationship.

Speaking of her character, Moynihan said: "I'm thrilled to be joining the cast of Hollyoaks and to be playing the character of enigmatic rock chick Beth. She's a quick-witted and independent young woman who loves indie and rock music as well as having a real lust for life." She continued, "Beth's got some great storylines lined up and I'm looking forward to the viewers' reactions as both her character and relationship with Rhys develops." A Channel 4 spokesperson also commented on Beth's upcoming storyline, saying: "Beth's going to be central to a massive autumn storyline for Hollyoaks which will turn certain characters' worlds upside down."

== Storylines ==
Beth first appears when she is run over by Rhys Ashworth whilst they are both on their way to purchase tickets to see a band. Beth is not injured, but discovers Rhys has bought the last tickets for himself. Rhys gives Beth a ticket, which belonged to his friend Gilly Roach. The pair swap numbers and begin to date. They quickly fall for each other. Rhys's family does not believe him when he tells them he has found a girlfriend. However, Beth begins to avoid Rhys. Unknown to Rhys, this is because her father has died. Rhys's father Noel Ashworth dies and Rhys attends the wake. Noel's brother Neville then introduces Rhys to Noel's daughter, Beth. Rhys and Beth avoid each other, and Rhys is angry, believing Beth had known all along that they were half siblings. He then tells her that he never wants to see her again. However, Beth soon begins at Hollyoaks Community College, despite applying for a transfer. Beth befriends fellow students, Zoe Carpenter and Kris Fisher, giving her a reason to stay in the village. Slowly, Rhys and Beth resolve their differences as Beth moves in with the Ashworths. The family throw her a birthday party to make her feel welcome. She becomes friends with her cousin Hannah Ashworth and they go on a double date with Gilly and Danny Valentine. Beth and Gilly eventually kiss and become a couple, which makes Rhys jealous. After months of hiding their feelings, Rhys and Beth give in. However, they both try to forget about it the next day. Gilly then takes Beth on a trip to Thailand. Before they leave, Beth and Rhys admit their love for each other, despite knowing it is illegal.

Beth and Gilly return from Thailand and are surprised to see Rhys has a new girlfriend, Mercedes McQueen. The following day, Rhys warns Beth that Gilly is planning to propose marriage to her. When Gilly proposes, Beth reluctantly agrees, despite continuing an affair with Rhys. Rhys and Beth decide to run away together, but Rhys realises his family need him. Beth becomes even more jealous of Rhys and Mercedes' relationship. Eventually Beth breaks down in front of Rhys, telling him she wants to be with him. As they kiss, they are both unaware that Mercedes' sister, Michaela McQueen is watching. Michaela confronts them. However, they tell her it is due to her drug habit. Angered, Michaela tells Gilly what she saw. However, he refuses to believe her. Despite this, he returns home, only to find Rhys and Beth in bed together. As the rest of the Ashworths return home, Gilly attacks Rhys and informs his family of his affair. Neville, Suzanne, Josh and Hannah are disgusted. Rhys and Beth are then thrown out of their home, having to move into the student accommodation. Beth and Rhys are questioned by the police and a court date is set. Realising they face prison, the couple decide to flee Hollyoaks. Gilly confronts them, before giving them the keys to his campervan. Rhys and Beth drive off. However, as they kiss, Rhys unknowingly drives onto the wrong side of the road and ends up in a collision with a lorry. Rhys wakes up in hospital the next day. However, he is told Beth was killed in the crash.

== Reception ==
An All About Soap writer included Beth and Rhys' incest plot in their list of "top ten taboos" storyline list. They assessed that it was one of the "taboos which have bravely been broken by soaps." They added that the duo "seemed like a good match until they discovered they shared the same dad!". Hollyoaks placed Rhys and Beth's relationship first on their "Top 10 Most Awkward Dating Moments in Hollyoaks History" compilation.
