= Drop Dead Gorgeous (TV series) =

- Created by: Carmel Morgan
- Starring: Sinéad Moynihan; Kathryn Hunt; Linzey Cocker; Connor McIntyre
- Opening theme: Nick Green & Tristin Norwell
- Country of origin: United Kingdom
- Original language: English
- No. of series: 2
- No. of episodes: 10

Production
- Running time: approx. 55 minutes
- Production company: Hat Trick Productions

Original release
- Network: BBC Three
- Release: 11 June 2006 – 21 October 2007

Drop Dead Gorgeous is a British comedy-drama for BBC Three. Set in Runcorn, it tells the story of 15-year-old Ashley Webb (played by Sinéad Moynihan), whose life is turned upside-down when she is approached by a spotter from a local modelling agency. Events move at lightning speed and the whole family, including Ashley's non-identical twin sister Jade (played by Linzey Cocker), are affected.

The first episode was shown on BBC Three on Sunday, 11 June 2006 at 10pm, with weekly episodes until the finale, which aired on 2 July 2006. The first series was shown for the first time on BBC One in August 2007, in the run up to the premiere of the second series on BBC Three. The second series began on 16 September 2007 at 9pm, again with weekly episodes until the finale on 22 October 2007.

== Cast ==
- Pauline Webb played by Kathryn Hunt
- Terry Webb played by Connor McIntyre
- Ashley Webb played by Sinéad Moynihan
- Jade Webb played by Linzey Cocker
- Mikey Webb played by Lee Worswick
- Val Duggan played by Elizabeth Berrington
- Ben McIntyre played by Andrew Knott
- Murray Priestman played by Lee Boardman
- Tiggsy Willis played by Dominic Carter

== Score ==
The music was especially commissioned and composed by Tristin Norwell & Nick Green.

== Locations ==
Although the series itself is set in the town of Runcorn in Cheshire, the school used is Philips High School in Whitefield, which is situated about 20–30 miles away from Runcorn, and is a pleasant, leafy suburb of northwest Manchester near the market town of Bury.

In the first series, some scenes set in London were actually recorded in Manchester. In one scene, the famous London Eye big wheel, had been digitally added using CGI methods, and was seen behind Manchester's Bridgewater Hall, the home of Manchester's Hallé Orchestra.

Some of the second series was filmed at The Lowry, Salford Quays and M2 Nightclub in Manchester. Most of the interiors were shot at The Pie Factory sound stage complex, also on Salford Quays.

== Episodes ==
=== Series overview ===
Series	Episodes	Originally released	
Series	Episodes	First released	Last released
1	4	11 June 2006	2 July 2006
2	6	16 September 2007	21 October 2007

=== Series 1 (2006) ===
No.	Title	Original release date
1	"Episode One"	11 June 2006
The twins go out into town where a woman follows the pair around. When Ashley and Jade finally settle down in a café the woman approaches them and says that she is from a model agency. Jade thinks the woman is there for her but is stunned when the card is presented to Ashley. This then creates tensions in the family especially with her non-identical twin Jade.
2	"Episode Two"	18 June 2006
Ashley goes to Paris when the bookings start flooding in, Pauline lets down Val, badly. Terry goes ballistic when he sees a poster of Ashley splashed in the middle of Runcorn.
3	"Episode Three"	25 June 2006
Ashley's first big payment cheque of £15,000. Ashley and Jade hold a party while mum and dad out for a weekend away, but the party goes bad when the house is trashed. Jade sleeps with Hardeep. A secret from Terry's past arises when a reporter comes knocking.
4	"Episode Four"	2 July 2006
Ashley is invited to London to model with the family, the Webbs hold a birthday party for Ashley and Jade. Jade thinks she may be pregnant. A lonely Ashley accuses her family of hating her and especially accuses Jade and moves into her Nana's and seals a £1million contract.

=== Series 2 (2007) ===
No.	Title	Original release date
5	"Episode One"	16 September 2007
Ashley goes international with a major casting for a huge designer label, with supermum Pauline firmly in tow. The pressure is still on at home as she flunks exams and fights with her sister, and the family are rocked by terrible news from Tiggsy. Meanwhile, Murray gets to sign the most important contract of his life.
6	"Episode Two"	23 September 2007
Murray returns from a business trip to discover his flat has been cleaned out and his husband is nowhere to be seen. Jade and Darren start making plans to move into a flat together and Ashley wonders whether she has found 'the one'.
7	"Episode Three"	30 September 2007
Brutus has been kidnapped and Murray sends Nana in to negotiate his release. Val spends a night to forget with Howard, and Tiggsy has a final drink with his mates in the pub. Terry discovers the truth about Ashley's secret affair, which means Jade has to suffer.
8	"Episode Four"	7 October 2007
Murray attempts to keep a lid on Ashley's affair, trying to keep both Terry and Jade quiet and on-side, and puts Ben into hiding. On the day the family say their final farewells to Tiggsy, a grieving clan Webb move into the house of Pauline's dreams with Ashley as landlord, but Ashley's not sure this is the life she really wants.
9	"Episode Five"	14 October 2007
Terry starts his night security job and enjoys the attention of a regular evening visitor. Now that Ashley's profile and income are growing, so are Murray's nerves, as other agents start to sniff around her. Pauline makes a terrible discovery that will blow the family apart.
10	"Episode Six"	21 October 2007
Jade discovers the truth about Terry's affair, and just as Pauline and Terry fight to keep their marriage and their family together a secret from their past comes back to haunt them. Murray is made an offer he can't refuse, and its time for Ashley to decide what she really wants, whether she wants to stay with her family and sister or go away and do a modeling job.
