= Sarah Jane Buckley =

British actress (b. 1968)

Sarah Jane Buckley (born 2 January 1968) is an actress and singer. She is also an ambassador for The Prince's Trust.

She played Kathy Barnes in Hollyoaks from November 2005 to January 2008 and again in April 2017 and September 2017. After leaving the show, Buckley performed in a number of stage productions including Songbird, a concert about the life of Eva Cassidy.

== Filmography ==
- Hollyoaks (2005–2008, 2017, TV series, as Kathy Barnes)
- Loose Women (2008, 1 episode, as self)
- Kicks (2009, as Angie)

== Stage performances ==
- Pop Star! (as Gina)
- Over The Rainbow (as Eva Cassidy)
- Peter Pan (2012, as Mrs Darling)
- Hormonal Housewives (2013)
- Sleeping Beauty (2014–2015, as Good Fairy, Christmas season production)
- Songbird (2015)
- Blood Brothers (2024)
