= David Hanson (producer) =

English television producer, active c. 1998

David Hanson is an English television producer well known for his production work on Coronation Street from September 1998 to October 1999, and the Liverpool based soap Hollyoaks. He introduced characters such as Clare Devine, Gilly Roach, Nancy Hayton and Rhys Ashworth.

In 1999, he was nominated for a BAFTA TV Award, Best British Soap.

== Works ==
- David Hanson, Roger Dixon, Jo Kingston, Access All Areas: Behind the Scenes at Coronation Street, Granada Media, 1999, ISBN 978-0-233-99722-3
