= Jim Millea =

English actor (b. 1958)

- Born: James Millea; 25 November 1958 (age 67); Leeds, West Riding of Yorkshire, England
- Occupation: actor
- Years active: 1989-present

James Millea (born 25 November 1958) is an English actor who played small businessman and publican Neville Ashworth in the Channel 4 soap opera Hollyoaks.

Millea trained at the Rose Burford College of Speech and Drama, and developed his acting skills in theatre by appearing in several National Theatre Productions, including Six Characters in Search of an Author, Hey Luigi, Fathers and Sons and Ting Tang Mine. Other stage work includes a year with the Royal National Theatre, Levi in Joseph and His Amazing Technicolor Dreamcoat, Luigi in Can't Pay Won't Pay and Father O'Neil in The Spanish Play.

He first came to public attention in 1989 as Pete Whiteley in Emmerdale, a married man who embarked upon an affair with teenager Rachel Hughes. Pete Whiteley was killed off in a hit-and-run car accident and his embittered wife Lynn set about confronting Rachel. A recurring role in the ITV children's drama Children's Ward in 1993 saw Millea play a parent who removes his son from the ward on learning that another patient is HIV positive. Millea has also appeared as minor characters in various television dramas and soaps including a one-off special episode of EastEnders "The return of Nick Cotton" in 2000; Crimewatch; Coronation Street, Heartbeat and A Touch of Frost. In 2005, Millea was cast as the father of the new Ashworth family in Hollyoaks, once remarking that he envied the life of his on-screen son, Rhys. He left the show in 2010. He has also played Carl Armstrong and Jeff Rayner in Coronation Street in 1994 and 2013 respectively.
