= Sinead Moynihan =

English model, actress (b. 1982)

- Born: Sinead Bernadette Moynihan; March 1982 (age 44); Salford, England
- Occupations: Actress; model
- Years active: 2006–present

Sinéad Bernadette Moynihan (born March 1982) is an English model and actress, best known for her roles as Ashley Webb in Drop Dead Gorgeous, Beth Clement in Hollyoaks, and Abby Jones in How Not to Live Your Life.

== Personal life ==
The eldest of three girls. She is the mother of two boys. She has been close friends with Linzey Cocker since they played the Webb sisters in BBC Three's comedy-drama Drop Dead Gorgeous in 2006.

== Career ==
Moynihan began modelling at age 16. She trained at Manchester School of Acting. In 2006 at the age of 24 she landed the role of teenage model Ashley Webb in the BBC Three drama Drop Dead Gorgeous, with Linzey Cocker who played her fraternal twin Jade Webb. In October 2007 she joined the Channel 4 show Hollyoaks, playing the character Beth Clement until April 2008. She also starred in the BBC Three sitcom How Not to Live Your Life's first series, returning for the standalone final episode three years later at Christmas 2011. She also featured in Payback Season in 2009. In December 2010, she featured in a Christmas advert for Liverpool One.
