= Sean Kennedy (Hollyoaks) =

UK soap opera character, created 2006

- Hollyoaks character
- Portrayed by: Matthew Jay Lewis
- Duration: 2006–2007
- First appearance: 15 February 2006
- Last appearance: 17 April 2007 (flashback)
- Introduced by: David Hanson
In-universe information
- Occupation: Businessman
- Wife: Louise Summers (2006-07)

Sean Kennedy is a fictional character from the British Channel 4 soap opera Hollyoaks. He is played by Matthew Jay Lewis. He first appeared in 2006 and briefly in 2007, where he is later murdered by Warren Fox (Jamie Lomas).

== Storylines ==
Sean arrived in Hollyoaks to track down his wife Louise Summers (Roxanne McKee), in an attempt to give his marriage another chance. Combining wit, charm and charisma, Sean is every bit the local competitive business man. He immediately made an impact in Hollyoaks as he bought the Pit Stop and the chemist to turn it into a Salon named Evissa. However, where the opposite sex are concerned Sean usually succumbed to temptation as he had a one-night stand with Clare Cunningham (Gemma Bissix). The pair kept this a secret as Sean didn't want to jeopardise his relationship with Louise.

Back in Ibiza, Sean cheated on Louise, which left Louise turning up in Hollyoaks and despite Sean's charms, Louise tried her best to fend him off. Much persuasion was needed from Sean as the pair began to battle for a divorce, but it was still clear that the chemistry was there between the pair. It proved to be too much tempting for Louise as she managed to sleep with Sean, but was still reluctant to give Sean another chance. However, Louise still deep down loved Sean and after Sean offered Louise a job as manager at the Salon- Louise accepted as the pair grew closer to one another. From there on the pair put their differences aside and reunited as a couple. Just around the corner, troubled reappeared for Sean when a friend from Ibiza turned up in the village.

Warren Fox (Jamie Lomas) arrived and wanted compensation from Sean, after Sean had testified against him- which resulted in Warren spending 18 months in jail in Spain. Warren demanded 100,000, but Sean refused and things got from bad to worse for Sean. Warren sent someone over to attack Sean which left him with bad bruising, leaving Sean to make another offer for Warren. In a desperate attempt to get Warren off his back, Sean offered Louise for one night to Warren- in an exchange for his debt to be paid off. Louise spent the night with Warren but refused to have sex with him. This left Sean with no choice but to hand him over Evissa as both he and Louise decided to leave Hollyoaks to make a fresh start. As Sean and Louise were about to leave, Louise confronted Sean about his idea of wanting her to sleep with Warren to pay off his debt. Sean denied this leaving Louise in tears as she told him that she no longer wants to leave Hollyoaks and wants to start a new life away with him. Sean left in a black cab, leaving a tearful Louise behind.

A year later Sean returned to Hollyoaks and demands £10,000 from Louise (after he discovered Warren had given her co-ownership of Evissa.) Warren paid half of it for her and she asked him to leave Sean alone but Warren pretended to be a taxi driver and on Sean's way home he stole his wallet and killed him. Later, Warren asks, but really forces by threat, Justin Burton (Chris Fountain) to dig up Sean's grave and throw his body in a river so the police won't find it. Indeed, his plan succeeds as the police search the area where Sean's body had been, of course finding nothing.

Some time passes and the issue of Sean's disappearance subsides. However, it re-emerges when Warren attacks Justin after he finds out Justin has been sleeping with Katy Fox (Hannah Tointon), Warren's 18-year-old sister. Clare, who tipped Warren off about the relationship, phoned the police as Warren rushed over to the flat to catch Justin and Katy and officers arrive and arrest Warren for assault. With Warren in custody overnight, Clare takes advantage of Justin's vulnerability and extracts the true story of Warren murdering Sean and where the body is now, telling Justin that he can trust her. As soon as Justin leaves, Clare calls the police with the information and Warren is re-arrested on suspicion of murder. The river into which Justin moved Sean's body is searched, but no body is found and Warren is released without charge.

In April 2008, Calvin Valentine was led to Sean's body in the woods of Hollyoaks by Barry "Newt" Newton (Nico Mirallegro) and Lauren Valentine (Dominique Jackson), who believed it was Elliot Bevan (Garnon Davies). The body was said to be badly decomposed. The end of the episode showed flashes of the search team and Warren and Louise happy at their "marriage" at the club. Louise was arrested, but through the efforts of Warren, Justin and Darren Osborne (Ashley Taylor Dawson), Jake Dean (Kevin Sacre) confessed and was sent to prison, even though he had absolutely nothing to do with the murder.

Calvin Valentine (Ricky Whittle) recorded Warren admitting to Sean and Louise's death, but after Warren was taken into custody Calvin discovered the tape was broken and it hadn't recorded anything, therefore the police had no evidence and Warren was released. However, because of Warren's relationship with his sister, Sasha Valentine (Nathalie Emmanuel), Calvin continued to try and prove Warren guilty, eventually convincing the whole village that he was a murderer.
