= Mercedes McQueen =

Fictional character from Hollyoaks

- Hollyoaks character
- Portrayed by: Jennifer Metcalfe
- Duration: 2006–present
- First appearance: 19 June 2006
- Introduced by: Bryan Kirkwood
- Spin-off appearances: Hollyoaks Later (2008, 2010–2012, 2020)
- Crossover appearances: Brookside (2025)
In-universe information
- Other names: Mercedes Owen; Mercedes Fisher; Mercedes Browning
- Occupation: Barmaid; Hospital cleaner; Prostitute; Club manager and owner; Pub landlady; Restaurant owner
- Family: McQueen
- Father: Billy Alexander
- Mother: Myra McQueen
- Sisters: Jacqui McQueen
- Half-brothers: Niall Rafferty; John Paul McQueen
- Half-sisters: Tina Reilly; Carmel McQueen; Michaela McQueen; Theresa McQueen; Emily Alexander; Carmina McQueen
- Husband: Russ Owen (2007–2008, 2018); Malachy Fisher (2008–2010); Paul Browning (2013); Sylver McQueen (2019–2022)
- Sons: Bobby Costello; Gabriel McQueen
- Daughters: Maria-Carmella McQueen; Maria-Gabriella Fox-McQueen
- Stepdaughters: Cher Winters
- Grandmothers: Marlena McQueen
- Aunts: Kathleen McQueen; Reenie McQueen
- Nephews: Max McQueen; Matthew McQueen
- Nieces: Phoebe McQueen (adoptive)
- First cousins: Theresa McQueen; Jennifique McQueen; Porsche McQueen; Celine McQueen; Cleo McQueen
- Other relatives: Bart McQueen; Goldie McQueen; Prince McQueen; Hunter McQueen; Breda McQueen

Mercedes McQueen (also Owen, Fisher and Browning) is a fictional character from the British Channel 4 soap opera Hollyoaks, played by Jennifer Metcalfe. She debuted on-screen during the episode airing on 19 June 2006 as the first character to be introduced to the series by series producer Bryan Kirkwood. In 2008 Metcalfe feared that the character was to be axed but was later reassured by the series producer that she would not be. Metcalfe later stated her intention to stay with the series. Mercedes is part of the McQueen family and is the longest serving McQueen on the series. On 26 August 2014, it was revealed that Metcalfe had decided to quit the soap. On 20 November 2014, Mercedes was presumably stabbed to death, with her body discarded. However, Metcalfe returned to screens on 17 February 2015 in a surprise, unannounced twist which saw Mercedes revealed as alive and well, living in Nice, France. It was announced that Mercedes would make a full-time return to the show in May 2015, after brief appearances on 18 February, 9 March, and 6 April. Metcalfe announced her pregnancy in 2017 and revealed that she would be taking a year's break from the show. Mercedes was last seen on screen leaving with Goldie McQueen (Chelsee Healey) on 4 July 2017, although she briefly appeared on 7 September 2017 in a fake flashback scene involving her and Amy Barnes (Ashley Slanina-Davies) surmised by James Nightingale (Gregory Finnegan). Mercedes returned on 9 July 2018, and then made several other appearances before returning permanently on 13 August.

Mercedes is described as a "savvy, ballsy girl that can't say no and is unapologetic about it". She is played as having moments of happiness which she ruins for herself and as managing to justify "whatever she does that's bad". Throughout her time on the series, Mercedes' storylines have centered on her relationships. These include her marriages to Russ Owen (Stuart Manning), Malachy Fisher (Glen Wallace) and Dr. Paul Browning (Joseph Thompson), with her second marriage involving her in an HIV storyline, an engagement to Riley Costello (Rob Norbury) and a committed relationship with Joe Roscoe (Ayden Callaghan). She has also been central to several affairs which included Calvin Valentine (Ricky Whittle), her sister's husband, and Riley's father Carl (Paul Opacic). Following the revelation of her affair with Carl on her wedding day to Riley, Mercedes was at the centre of a kidnapping storyline when she was held against her will by Riley's serial killer grandfather, Silas Blissett (Jeff Rawle), before going into labour, giving birth to a boy as a result of the stress. Following her ordeal Mercedes briefly turned to prostitution. When Mitzeee (Rachel Shenton) grows close to Riley, Mercedes begins to stalk her. During the culmination of the plot, in "pure desperation" Mercedes stabs herself and Mitzeee is blamed. Mercedes' friend, Lynsey Nolan (Karen Hassan), discovers Mercedes' stalking of Mitzeee and stabbing of herself. Lynsey is later murdered in a "whodunit" storyline with Mercedes becoming a suspect in her murder. It is later revealed Mercedes' partner Doctor Browning killed Lynsey to protect Mercedes and in October 2013, Mercedes, Cindy Cunningham (Stephanie Waring) and Lindsey Butterfield (Sophie Austin) kill and cover up the murder of Doctor Browning.

In the run-up to her 2014 departure, Mercedes was involved in feuds with Freddie Roscoe (Charlie Clapham) and Grace Black (Tamara Wall) and mourning for her sister Carmel (Gemma Merna) following a train crash, which Mercedes was also involved in. Since her return in February 2015, her storylines have included reuniting with her family, her relationship with Joe and delivering a stillborn son named Gabriel, exposing Lindsey as the Gloved Hand Killer, Silas returning and targeting her again, and her feud with Joanne Cardsley (Rachel Leskovac) over Joe, who later dies during the show's "Halloween Spooktacular" episodes. In late 2019, the character finds herself at the centre of another "whodunit" storyline, "Who Shot Mercedes?", where she is shot having angered various residents. Mercedes later became the first character in soap opera to go through a superfecundation pregnancy, after having an affair with Warren Fox (Jamie Lomas) while engaged to Felix Westwood (Richard Blackwood). Following the serial's historic "time jump" in September 2024, Mercedes is shown to be battling an aggressive form of bowel cancer.

Metcalfe has received numerous awards and nominations for her portrayal of Mercedes. Metcalfe has been praised by the British press for her performance in the role. The character has also been praised and criticised by the British press, for her numerous relationships and affairs, her appearance, her status as a "slapper" and her penchant for finding herself in "terrifying situations".

== Character creation and casting ==
Mercedes was created by producer Bryan Kirkwood, as part of his rejuvenation of Hollyoaks in 2006, which included the creation of his "brainchild" the McQueen family. She was the first character created by Kirkwood during his tenure as executive producer. Jennifer Metcalfe, who had previously been considered for the role of Clare Devine (Gemma Bissix) before Mercedes was created, successfully auditioned for the role. Kirkwood credited Metcalfe with making the character her own and with bringing Mercedes to life. Like her sister, Porsche, Mercedes takes her name from the luxury vehicle of the same name.

Metcalfe reported that she was "put forward for Hollyoaks" but had to audition eight times before she was offered the role. She later revealed that when creating the part she took "inspiration" from several places, most prominently from Eva Longoria's role in Desperate Housewives as Gabrielle Solis. In 2008, due to her character's HIV scare, Metcalfe feared she was to going to be fired from the serial and had to seek reassurance from the producer that her fears were unfounded. In 2011 Metcalfe stated her plans to stay with the serial indefinitely, saying, "I never get bored or lose interest" with her storylines and scripts. In 2012, Kirkwood said that due to Metcalfe being the first actress he cast in Hollyoaks he was "so chuffed that she's becoming a real star". He added that "telling stories for Mercedes is as exciting now as it was on day one". In 2013, Metcalfe revealed to The Mirror that she was proud of portraying the character "everyone loves to hate". In May 2013, Metcalfe signed a new contract keeping her on the soap for at least another year. In 2020, Metcalfe signed a new contract that would keep her in the soap until at least September 2021. On 15 April 2024, It was announced that Metcalfe is one of the few characters remaining in the soap despite most people getting axed.

== Development ==
=== Characterisation ===
"Mercy used to be a tart with a heart, but I'm wondering if the girl's got a heart any more! I wouldn't have it any other way, though. She's got badder as she's got older. She vows to change every time she does something wrong, and it's getting to the point now where no one's buying it".

— Jennifer Metcalfe on how Mercedes has developed through her tenure (2012).

Kirkwood branded Mercedes "a savvy, ballsy girl that can't say no and is unapologetic about it". Metcalfe has described Mercedes as someone who "hates every woman in Hollyoaks" except her own sisters, and as someone who talks too much and has a "mouth like a foghorn". She went on to say that Mercedes "always looks after her family and would never do anything to deliberately hurt them. Mercedes' heart is definitely in the right place". Metcalfe observed that Mercedes is "completely mad" and she "just does whatever she feels like doing at the time. She doesn't exactly think things through". Metcalfe further explained that Mercedes did not "consider consequences", which led her to unintentionally "destroy everything". She elaborated on this, saying that Mercedes never has a happy ending "because she can't. I don't think with Mercedes there is ever a happy ending. Just when something might go her way or something's going to go right for her, she destroys it". She said that her character is "used to getting her own way" so she thought that despite her actions, "everything will turn out right in the end". She opined that Mercedes was at her best in this state, being "minxy and destructive". Metcalfe described Mercedes in this way: "Whatever she does that's bad, she manages to justify in her head. She doesn't have much self-worth and she knows what she's like". Metcalfe also expressed the hope that Mercedes could be happy "free and single". She explained that Mercedes was unable to remain happy, saying: "she has moments of happiness but ruins them herself". She went on to explain that due to Mercedes' first love having "messed her up", Mercedes behaved "the way she is where men are concerned". She further explained that Mercedes believed she could change but was disappointed when she could not. Metcalfe said, "When she says that she's going to change, she actually means it; she just can't sustain it."

A reporter for E4's official website described Mercedes saying "She's no angel but the Village would be far less entertaining without our Mercedes. This glamorous McQueen can't seem to keep herself out of trouble – more often than not due to her tendency to hop into bed with those she shouldn't!" They later said Mercedes is invincible, as "no matter evils she perpetrates, somehow she still manages to come out smelling of roses". Hollyoaks international broadcaster BBC America has described Mercedes stating: "Cocky, confident, and mean with a right hook, Mercedes McQueen isn't afraid of anyone, especially not a man. She knows what effects her assets have on the opposite sex, and she always gets what she wants". What's on TV described her as the "man-eater of the McQueen clan" who will not "take any nonsense" and is not "shy when it comes to a scrap!" Digital Spy described Mercedes as "known for her fiery temper and sharp tongue". Mercedes has also been described as "mouthy", a "bitchy maneater", "feisty", "troubled", "gorgeous", a "sultry siren" and "spirited" by various media sources.

=== Relationships ===
==== Russ Owen ====
Despite Mercedes' relationship with Russ Owen (Stuart Manning), she had sex with Warren Fox (Jamie Lomas) and feeling guilty, proposed to Russ which he accepted. Metcalfe felt Mercedes might again stray with "Warren hanging around on the sidelines" although she hoped Mercedes would remain faithful to Russ. Mercedes and Russ marry despite the ceremony being interrupted by Louise Summers (Roxanne McKee). Looking back at the wedding, Metcalfe commented that the wedding "didn't go smoothly". Warren was accused of attempting to murder Clare Devine (Gemma Bissix), but his innocence and her infidelity was established when it was revealed that they were together the night Clare was attacked. Metcalfe said that "although Mercedes knew she was taking a risk by sleeping with Warren, she genuinely thought she'd get away with it". She opined that after her and Russ' "honeymoon period" ended, Mercedes felt guilty and considered "spilling the beans", although Metcalfe was not sure she would tell the truth about her affair with Russ.

During Russ' trial, Mercedes decided to go to the court to testify for him due to Nancy Hayton (Jessica Fox), who explained to Mercedes that her sister died because Justin Burton (Chris Fountain) was "too gutless to come forward and tell the truth". This encouraged Mercedes to "take a long, hard look at herself", and she realized that she was doing the same thing in the situation with Warren. On her way to the court, however, Mercedes was "all over the place". According to Metcalfe, everyone was shocked when Mercedes walked into the courtroom. She said that Mercedes was unsure of what she was going to tell the court, "but her alibi is vital to Warren's case – his fate lies in her hands". Metcalfe said that even if Mercedes and Russ ended their relationship, which they did shortly after she confessed the truth, would not matter because she believed that it would not take Mercedes "long before she goes back to her old ways" because "that's just the type of person she is – Mercedes likes playing the field and having fun, and no man's going to change her"

==== Tony Hutchinson ====
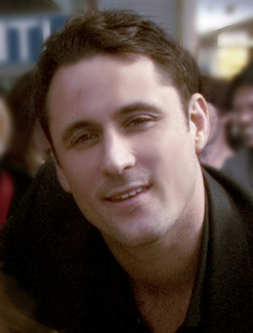
Nick Pickard (pictured) plays Tony Hutchinson.

Although Tony Hutchinson (Nick Pickard) was in a relationship with Mercedes' sister, Jacqui (Claire Cooper), he and Mercedes had sex. Metcalfe explained this was because Mercedes was intoxicated and unaware of her actions, "but she was also furious at Jacqui for giving her a slap". Metcalfe explained that when Mercedes woke up, she was in disbelief about the events of the previous night and felt "appalled". She added that Mercedes did not fancy Tony and that they did not even like each other, which was why "neither of them can understand what happened between them". Regarding Mercedes' feelings about hurting Jacqui, Metcalfe stated: "Mercedes hates herself for it. She feels incredibly guilty and ashamed of what she's done. It's surprising Jacqui doesn't guess something is wrong because Mercedes can't look her in the eye".

Mercedes discovered she has fallen pregnant, which left her "totally devastated". Metcalfe expressed that Mercedes "felt bad enough about sleeping with Tony. Finding out she's pregnant is a nightmare". Mercedes informed Tony about the pregnancy, despite their dislike for each other, because she felt he had the right to know. According to Metcalfe, Mercedes considered giving her baby to her sister, since Jacqui was unable to have children but wanted to become a mother, but did not tell Jacqui the baby's paternity. Metcalfe also felt that Mercedes decided against giving Jacqui the baby because Mercedes was unable to "cope" with the baby's paternity, and would be more willing to give Jacqui the baby if Tony was not the father. When asked if Mercedes would keep the baby herself, Metcalfe said, "She would if it was Russ' or maybe even the product of a one-night stand. But Tony's baby and all the baggage that comes with that? No thanks!" Mercedes decided to terminate the pregnancy. When asked how she thought Jacqui would react if she found out that Tony was the father, Metcalfe said Jacqui would "go a bit psycho". She also said that it would take a long time for Jacqui to forgive Mercedes if she discovered the truth.

==== Malachy Fisher ====
Mercedes began a relationship with Malachy Fisher (Glen Wallace). He proposed marriage to her, but she refused. Mercedes has sex with a stranger; Metcalfe remarked, "Sex usually makes her forget about everything else that's going on. But afterwards she still can't stop thinking about Malachy, so she decides to go and see him to work out how she feels". Mercedes subsequently accepted Malachy's proposal and they marry. Mercedes found that she did not contract HIV from Malachy.

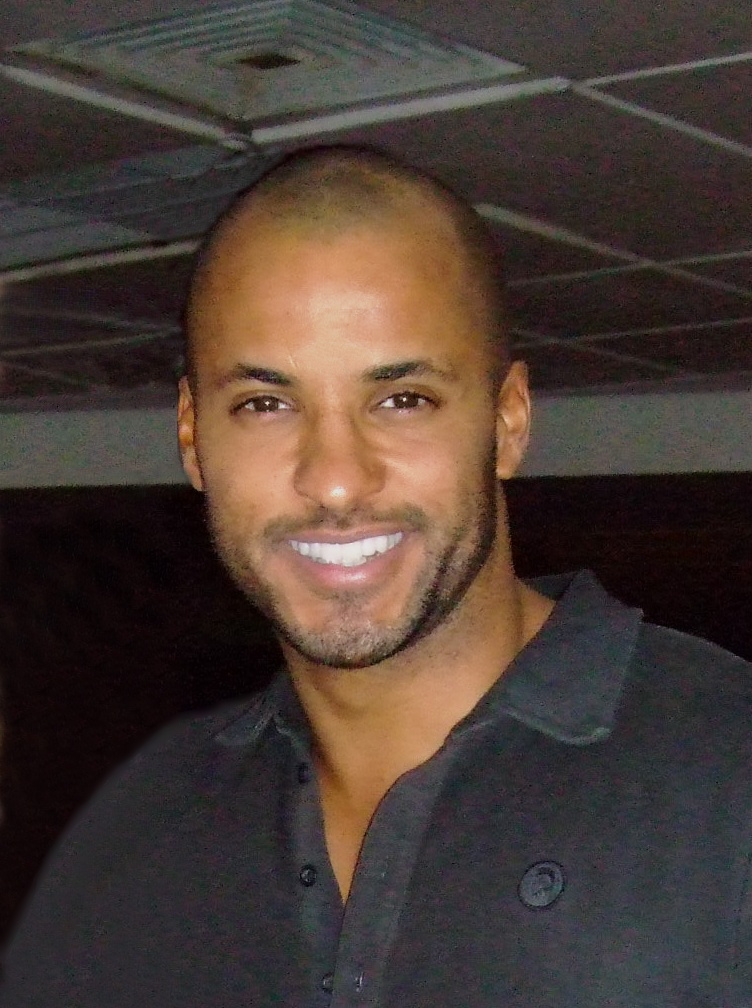
Ricky Whittle (pictured), who plays Calvin Valentine, expressed doubts with the storyline surrounding Mercedes and Calvin's affair, but felt the plot was "exciting".

Complications in Mercedes' relationship with Malachy occurred when she begins an affair with Calvin Valentine (Ricky Whittle) while working with him at The Loft. Metcalfe expressed that she had initial "reservations" about the storyline which she felt was "far-fetched", adding that once she had begun filming the scenes she thought the plot was "brilliant" even though she felt Mercedes would be perceived as a "bitch". Whittle expressed similar doubts, saying he felt it was "a bit out of character" for Calvin, although he felt the plot was "exciting". At first the pair did not like each other, but after spending time together, they realized that there was more to their personalities than they initially thought. Whittle explained that the attraction between Mercedes and Calvin began "building", to the point that she and Malachy have "a massive row" and Calvin comforts her; Whittle stated that "the next thing you know they're tearing each other's clothes off".

According to Metcalfe, Mercedes did not want to have an affair and was not "looking for someone else", stating, "Malachy's been working hard to provide for them and he hasn't had a lot of time for her". Turning to Calvin, she confided in him and they kiss. Whittle added that the affair had become more serious and their chemistry was "more than just physical". Also according to Metcalfe, "Every three months Mercedes has to have an HIV test and, yes, it is making her resent Malachy a bit. She can't help wondering what it would be like to be with someone like Calvin who isn't HIV positive", even though she felt "guilty". When Mercedes learned that she has to be retested for HIV, she feared that the test would be positive. Initially, she did not tell Malachy about it, but eventually "snaps" at him, telling him she "won't forgive him" if she has contracted HIV. The test was negative which was a "huge relief" for them.

Malachy later witnessed Mercedes and Calvin kissing but did not interrupt them. Wallace felt this was because he truly loved Mercedes and had accepted that "his life is much better with Mercedes in it". Whittle explained that Malachy tested Mercedes and Calvin because he wanted to discover if "what he saw was a one-off or more serious". The pair failed the test and Mercedes, fearing that Malachy knew the truth, told Calvin that they had to end their affair, "but they simply can't stay away from each other". He added that the relationship could become more serious for Calvin as "he's in danger of really falling for her". Mercedes began to develop feelings for Calvin who did not expect Mercedes to develop "such deep feelings" for him. When Calvin rejected Mercedes she informed Calvin's sister Sasha Valentine (Nathalie Emmanuel) that Calvin left Sasha's then-boyfriend Warren to die in a fire; Sasha responded to the revelation by throwing Calvin out of their home. Not being able to "get past what happened with Warren", Calvin and Carmel decide to end their relationship. Calvin confronted Mercedes, who "tells him that he's ruined her life and warns that she's going to do the same to him".

Calvin and Carmel become reunited and plan to remarry. Metcalfe told a What's on TV reporter that Mercedes was unable to accept Calvin loved Carmel more than her because "in her head, he doesn't. She can't think rationally about this. Her thing for Calvin is an obsession now". Mercedes tried to prevent the wedding going forward, including by anonymously threatening Calvin and by canceling the wedding plans. Calvin discovered that Mercedes was behind the threats, and the pair go on to have a "day of passion"; Metcalfe explained that their relationship is "all about the sex". Mercedes tried everything to convince Calvin not to go through with the wedding. As Metcalfe stated, "They talk, shout and cry and she tells him she loves him". Mercedes told Calvin, who "just sat there like a puppy, being manipulated by her", that he should marry her instead, and he agreed and promised to tell Carmel. Mercedes later discovered that he has not told Carmel and she can not "believe he's chosen Carmel over her". Calvin was killed on his wedding day; Metcalfe revealed to What's on TV that Mercedes has "got it in her" to kill Calvin. She added that her character still loves Malachy, but Malachy and Mercedes end their relationship. Mercedes' cousin Theresa (Jorgie Porter) was later found to have shot Calvin.

Mercedes lied that she has contracted HIV from Malachy who ends his relationship with Lynsey Nolan (Karen Hassan) to reunite with Mercedes. When Malachy discovered her lies, he hit Mercedes, who felt, according to Metcalfe, that she "deserved it" because she was "awful" and "the lies she told were just disgusting. She doesn't resent Malachy for hitting her at all". Mercedes reconciled with Malachy; Metcalfe explained that Mercedes still loved Malachy but was unable to stay away from other men. She added that seeing Malachy with Lynsey helped Mercedes "realize" how much she loved him. After Malachy is injured in an explosion, Metcalfe explained that Mercedes regretted her affair with Calvin and she "desperately" wanted the chance to "make things work" with Malachy. She added that if he died, Mercedes would find it difficult to live with her guilt. If Malachy were to die Mercedes would be "devastated" as he was "the only positive thing in her life. [...] She thinks that she's nothing without him". Malachy died. Metcalfe felt that when Malachy shielded Mercedes from the explosion by throwing himself over her it "proves to her how much he loves her. She knows that's special and regrets she ever took him and his love granted". Metcalfe felt that she and Wallace "had amazing storylines", opining that Malachy's death was the most emotional scene she had filmed while with the serial.

==== Riley and Carl Costello ====
Mercedes' next relationship was with Riley Costello (Rob Norbury); their first romantic encounter occurred in the episodes following Malachy's death. Metcalfe believed that this behavior was typical of Mercedes. Malachy had died and rather than "moping" about she chooses to get on with her life. Riley filled the role of giving Mercedes some attention "when she needs it most". The serial introduced complications with Riley and Mercedes' relationship with the introduction of Riley's father Carl Costello (Paul Opacic). Carl's disapproval of Mercedes created tension between them and she "hits a nerve" by jibing Carl. Metcalfe explained that Mercedes asked Carl what he would do if she stayed with Riley. In an effort to "wind him up", Mercedes suggested that she and Carl sleep together; Metcalfe stated that it was "obvious he's tempted", and Mercedes and Carl start an affair. Opacic told a reporter from Inside Soap that Mercedes and Carl felt guilty about their tryst, but suggested that viewers keep watching to see if the two could "stay away from each other". He added that while Riley believed Mercedes was "the girl of his dreams", Carl believed that Mercedes was not "good enough" for his son.

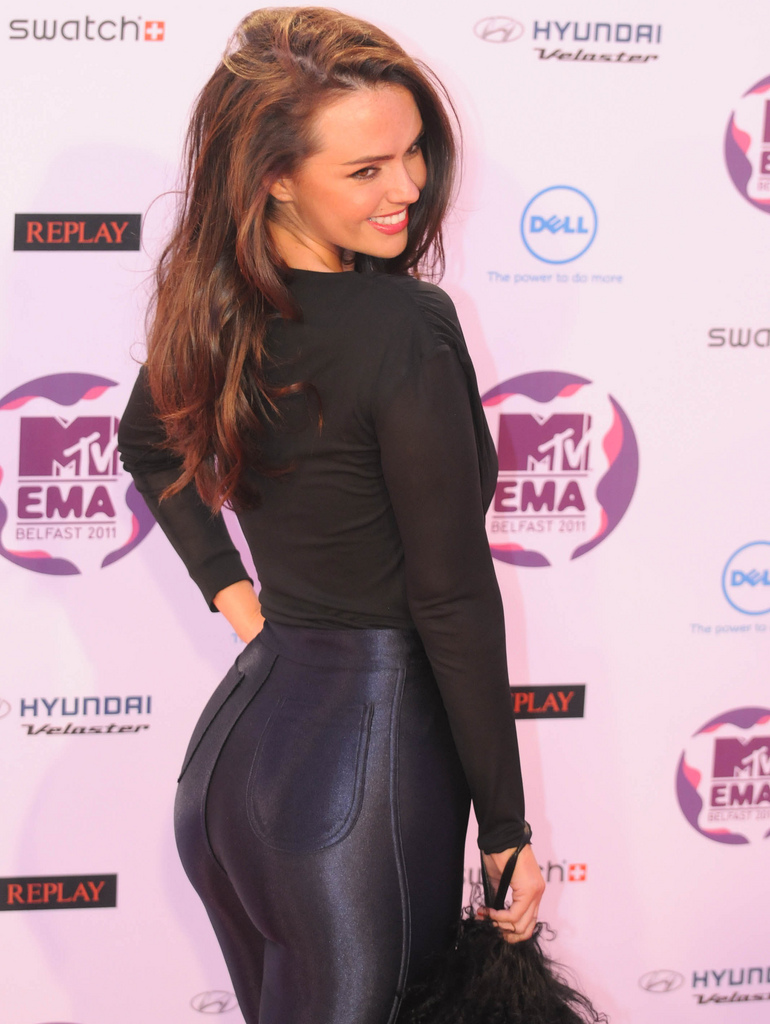
Jennifer Metcalfe (pictured) explained that Mercedes felt like her world "could collapse" if her affair with Riley's father, Carl, was exposed.

Mercedes and Riley become engaged. Riley's brother Seth Costello (Miles Higson) discovered that she and his father had an affair, so she lied about falling pregnant to prevent the truth from coming out. On the advice from her mother Myra McQueen (Nicole Barber-Lane), Mercedes planned to fake a miscarriage, but Mercedes' sister Jacqui discovered the affair and Mercedes' intention to fake a miscarriage. Jacqui was "disgusted" and threatened to expose the affair; Metcalfe commented that this left Mercedes feeling like her "world could collapse around her at any moment". "On eggshells" after Jacqui's discovery, Mercedes believed Jacqui would expose the affair. Metcalfe described Jacqui's attitude towards Mercedes, stating, "Jacqui knows what Mercedes is, she knows what she's like – but she resorts to judging her because she's just trying to support her". Metcalfe explained that if Jacqui kept the affair secret Mercedes would be "relieved" that she still has Riley, and although she would not immediately think of Carl, Mercedes was worried that "they could end up in bed together again". Metcalfe went on to say that Mercedes "loves Riley" but "can't help fancying Carl", adding that for Mercedes "there's a difference between love and lust".

The Daily Star announced that after lying about being pregnant for several weeks, Mercedes was to launch a "vicious" attack on Mitzeee (Rachel Shenton), saying she tried to make up for her "mistake" by "turning on the tears and apologising". Metcalfe felt that Riley and Mercedes would "fall out big time" because of Mercedes' attack on Mitzeee. Mercedes discovered she had actually become pregnant but was unsure of the child's paternity. Metcalfe commented that the storyline had "got interesting" due to Mercedes' pregnancy. During the storyline Metcalfe wore a prosthetic baby bump which she found "uncomfortable".

During the fourth series of the late-night spin-off show, Hollyoaks Later, Mercedes' past was explored when she goes to Ibiza to celebrate her hen night. While there, she was reunited with Johnny (Chris Coghill), her first love. Metcalfe said this caused a "real mix of emotions for Mercedes". She went on to elaborate that there was a lot her character wanted to say to Johnny but "at the same time she doesn't see the point. There's a lot of anger there. But there's also a lot of excitement for Mercedes as she sees him again because he was the guy who won her heart for the first time. The storyline also explains why Mercedes is the way she is now". Mercedes and Johnny kissed, which Metcalfe said was them just "getting lost in the moment" and was partly due to Mercedes having doubts about Riley's fidelity. She added that Mercedes and Johnny spend time "just talking and reliving the old times, especially how he won her over in the past".

The storyline was concluded with a week's worth of episodes focusing on the pair's wedding and fallout. A trailer, which took over 15 hours to film, was produced to promote the episodes and featured several characters dressed in black and who could expose her affair with Carl, watching Mercedes go down the aisle. During the trailer Mercedes cried a black tear, done by the show's make-up artists putting black paint in Metcalfe's eye. Norbury opined that Riley was caught up in planning the wedding and that his feelings for Mercedes were "very strong", adding that Riley "loves her to bits and he thinks that she's everything". In the lead up to the wedding it was shown that potential guests who could reveal the affair included Jacqui, Seth, Carl, Mercedes, Warren, Mitzeee and Doug Carter (PJ Brennan).

On her wedding day to Riley, Mercedes was the one who exposes the affair. Metcalfe said this was because when Mercedes looked into Riley's eyes she "couldn't help it" because of her love for him, and because Jacqui's entrance "just tipped her over the edge". Metcalfe went on to say that she did not think Mercedes "thought about it" when revealing the affair, but if she had thought it through she would not have revealed the secret. Metcalfe postulated that there would be "huge repercussions" from the events, explaining that her following storylines "all stem from the wedding". Metcalfe added that she did not "fancy" the chances of a reunion for Mercedes and Riley although the actress would have liked one. Metcalfe commented that she "loved" the storyline and with working with Norbury.

==== Doctor Browning ====
Lynsey is found dead by Brendan Brady (Emmett J. Scanlan) in June 2012. Her death sparked a "whodunit storyline" with Mercedes in the frame for her murder. Digital Spy explained her motives stating, "Mercedes has also become increasingly deranged in recent weeks and wanted to keep Lynsey quiet after she discovered the truth about her stalking of Mitzeee". A promotional image featuring Mercedes was later released by Hollyoaks which confirmed Mercedes as an official suspect in the mystery. Mercedes entered a relationship with Doctor Browning, who had previously paid her for sex, in an attempt to make Riley jealous. Smithwick told Daniel Kilkelly of Digital Spy that she "was nervous about the union of the dark soul mates, Mercy and Browning, but their chemistry is so watchable – that story is pretty dark". Mercedes began to "fall for the charms" of Doctor Browning, believing she had "landed on her feet" when he invited her to a charity ball. Metcalfe commented that Mercedes began to think he could provide her with the WAG life style that she had always wanted. She added that Mercedes still had feelings for Riley and was "being very sneaky" in her attempts to win him back. She explained that Mercedes "still wants Riley back but, as we know, when she has everything she desires, she still craves a bit of danger". Thompson elaborated on this, saying Mercedes "thinks she wants the quiet life with Riley, but Dr Browning offers an exciting alternative for her, he knows what makes her tick, and the two of them are excited by how dangerous the other is". On Doctor Browning's feelings for Mercedes, Thompson said: "he's fallen for her and will do whatever it takes to be with her. He thinks if he spends enough time with Mercy, he'll win her around". When Doctor Browning witnessed Riley kiss Mercedes "it becomes a question of how much he can take" and he decided he must "make a quick move" to prevent them reuniting. To do this he takes Mercedes to a shooting range, Thompson explained that there she "realises there's an undeniable connection between them". He added that the couple are "kindred spirits" and Mercedes spending time with him made her rethink their relationship. Thompson said "it seemed to be written in the stars that Mercedes and Riley will get back together – but Dr Browning won't let that happen" and to do this he threatened Riley. Thompson claimed that due to Doctor Browning having incriminating evidence showing that Mercedes discharged herself at the time Lynsey was murdered it gives him "real power, she thinks she's in control, but she might just be underestimating Dr Browning..." Metcalfe said that she feels Doctor Browning is Mercedes soul mate, explaining that "he gives as good as he gets and I think that's really good for my character". On who Mercedes loves more out of Doctor Browning and Riley, Metcalfe said "it's Doctor Browning all the way for her, i think he really took her by storm and she absolutely adores him". On 17 August 2012 during E4's first look episode it was revealed Doctor Browning had killed Lynsey. Hollyoaks' official website said Doctor Browning's motives in killing Lynsey were "presumably to protect Mercedes".

Mercedes and Riley reunite but when she discovers Riley does not love her she kidnaps Bobby in revenge and blames it on a Mitzeee, who has recently escaped from prison. Metcalfe said Mercedes does not have "any regrets whatsoever. I think she does what she does at the time for a reason and she'll deal with the consequences later". Mercedes is arrested when Myra reports her to the police. Riley is shortly after shot dead. Mercedes is put on trial for two counts of perverting the course of justice, one for the kidnap and one for stabbing herself. Digital Spy's Kilkelly reported that Mercedes' lawyer, Jim McGinn (Dan Tetsell), would advise Mercedes to blame Riley for the crimes as he can not defend himself. Mercedes reluctantly agrees and tells the courtroom that Riley stabbed her and was abusive towards her. Metcalfe felt the scenes were "great to film", adding that "the writers came up with some brilliant material". However, she felt the scenes were "challenging" to film as Mercedes "completely breaks down and says how bad Riley was. From the audience's point of view, it's really going to be quite shocking". The actress added that Mercedes "does feel guilty about it, but only as guilty as Mercedes can ever feel. So she gets over it very quickly!" During the trial Jim suggests that Riley killed Lynsey and that Doctor Browning is innocent. Doctor Browning appears at the trial to give evidence, which Metcalfe revealed is "a total surprise. I don't think she knows how she'll react until she actually sees him, and when she does they're back in that moment when he was dragged away from her. She really did fall for him hook, line and sinker".

=== Kidnap by Silas Blissett and prostitution ===
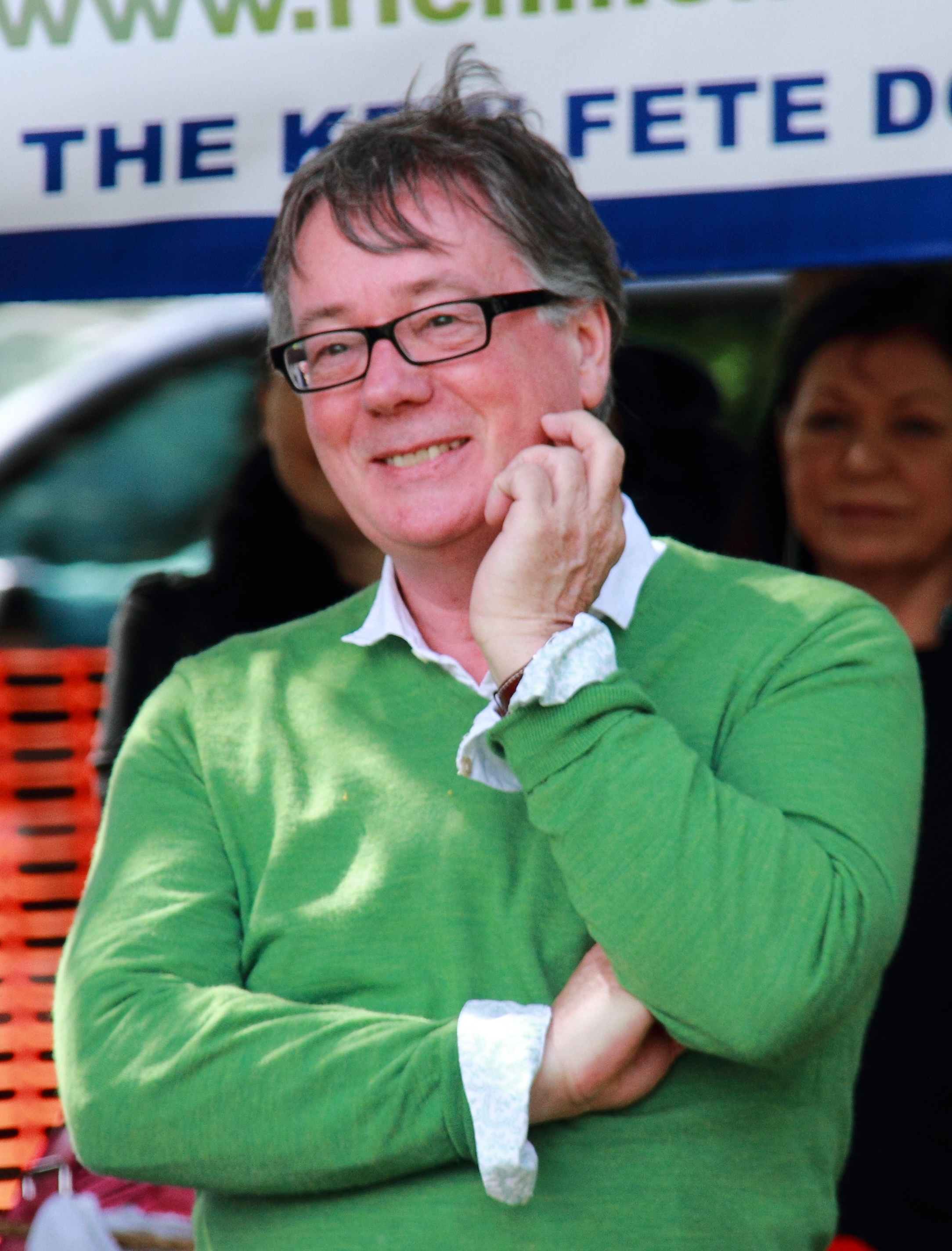
Jeff Rawle (pictured) played Mercedes' kidnapper, Silas Blissett.

On 16 October 2011, it was revealed that Mercedes' next storyline, following straight on from her wedding to Riley, would focus on her kidnapping by Riley's serial killing grandfather, Silas Blissett (Jeff Rawle). On Mercedes' wedding day to Riley, Silas kidnapped her in a "shock storyline twist" after Mercedes revealed her affair with Carl. This storyline was for Rawle who had announced his story climax and departure from the series in August 2011. Metcalfe had previously teased that Mercedes might have to watch her back around Silas in the future. Silas planned to hold Mercedes until after she gave birth. According to Metcalfe in a Digital Spy interview, Mercedes felt "pure fear" throughout her ordeal and that she "thinks that she's going to die and she fears that her baby will die too". Metcalfe opined that viewers would see Mercedes "go through different emotions" during her ordeal, explaining that she went from "begging", to "breaking down crying", to exhaustion. She added that the storyline was "a little bit" dark, but did not reveal whether or not Mercedes would survive her kidnapping. Metcalfe also stated that a special set was built in which the kidnapping scenes were filmed over five days.

On 19 December 2011, it was announced by Digital Spy that Mercedes would put her difficult year behind her and Lynsey would become a source of support for Mercedes. It was revealed that Mercedes would be tempted when a "charming doctor arrives on the scene and shows her the benefits of 'selling her services'". Mercedes began working as an escort; Metcalfe explaining, "Mercedes signs up with an escort agency to try to earn some quick cash. She reckons it's the only thing she'll ever be good at, but it's clear that she hasn't stopped to think it all through".

While Mercedes is on an escorting job, Lynsey confronted her and tried to convince Mercedes not to go through with it. Metcalfe told an Inside Soap reporter that this left Mercedes "devastated" as she has "built up the courage to go through with it". Metcalfe went onto tease that things will get "darker" for her character. Mercedes became depressed and her sister Jacqui decided to help her. Mercedes attempted to seduce Jacqui's husband Rhys Ashworth (Andrew Moss), who told Jacqui. Cooper said Jacqui "knows what state of mind" Mercedes was in and "lays into" Mercedes, who revealed she has been working as a prostitute. Cooper explained Jacqui's reaction is "pretty harsh" and that she thought Mercedes was a "promiscuous tart and a pathetic excuse for a woman" with "no morals". Cooper said Jacqui had "given Mercedes chance after chance, and feels that she doesn't deserve anything more".

In another twist Mercedes discovered that Silas would not be put on trial and would instead be put in an institute for the insane. Metcalfe said this left her alter ego feeling "very let down" as a trial would be the opportunity for Mercedes to "tell the world about the terrible things Silas did and make sure that he got punished". She went on to say that Mercedes felt like Silas was "getting away with it". Metcalfe explained that Mercedes feared that Silas would escape and explained that Mercedes never recovered from her ordeal but did what she usually did: "put it in a box and tried to forget about it. If Mercedes dwelt on all the bad things she's been through, she'd go crazy. That box must be full now".

Metcalfe told Katy Moon from Inside Soap that to forget about the situation Mercedes "wants to feel numb" and as a means of "escape" she called Doctor Browning, which left her feeling "awful". Metcalfe explained that Mercedes was in "self destruct mode" and she "hates herself" for having sex with Doctor Browning, although she does not take money this time. Metcalfe justified Mercedes' actions by saying Mercedes was "looking for any distraction, any way to escape her demons". Mercedes took a business man back to her hotel room where "things end badly"; she locked herself in the bathroom and refused to come out. As Metcalfe explained, Lynsey soon arrived to comfort her, and came to her "rescue when she's at her lowest point. Lynsey can see how broken Mercedes is". On the friendship, Metcalfe said that the "characters are like chalk and cheese, which I think works well", while Hassan said the characters "have this kind of prickly friendship". She added that they have "a lot of things in common, but they're very different people. It's almost like they shouldn't be friends, but opposites attract. Lynsey sees qualities in Mercy that she kind of wishes she had herself. Mercy's very straight-talking, she's quite ballsy and calls a spade a spade, and sometimes Lynsey wishes she had a bit of that gusto. So I think that's what attracts her to Mercy". Both Metcalfe and Hassan praised the friendship between Mercedes and Lynsey, with Metcalfe saying she "loved" the friendship and enjoyed seeing her persona "form a good bond with Lynsey" while Hassan praised the chemistry between herself and Metcalfe.

Riley was "furious" when he discovered Mercedes' escorting, and told her he did not want her around their son Bobby. Regarding Mercedes' maternal feelings for Bobby, she stated, "Mercedes feels that when she's getting closer to Riley, she can bond a bit more with Bobby as well. But when Riley forgets her, she finds it a lot more difficult to cope with Bobby". Mercedes explained that she did not sleep with Doctor Browning for money this time, which calmed Riley down. Metcalfe said that Mercedes was "very honest and open" with Riley and that they were "very natural together". The actress said Riley had begun to "see that she's really damaged and has been affected by what's happened a lot more than she's letting on". Metcalfe added that Riley felt sorry for Mercedes after seeing the "vulnerable Mercedes, the one who doesn't hurt people". Metcalfe said that Mercedes wanted Riley back, but if she could not, she wanted to prevent anyone else from getting the life Mercedes would have had if she had married Riley. She added that although Mercedes wanted Riley back she loved Malachy more, and believed that Malachy was the love of Mercedes' life.

The actress said that if Mercedes discovered Riley's relationship with Lynsey she would "feel utterly betrayed". To cause tension between the friends Mercedes discovered Riley's relationship with Lynsey. Metcalfe said that her character gets "such a shock" but because of Mercedes' close friendship with Lynsey she "might not react the way people expect". Metcalfe went on to say that she felt her character's feelings for Riley have "gone beyond love... it's an obsession now". She explained that Mercedes' plan was "more destructive than winning him back", and that she was "playing a game. The old Mercedes will be back shortly".

=== Stalking Mitzeee ===
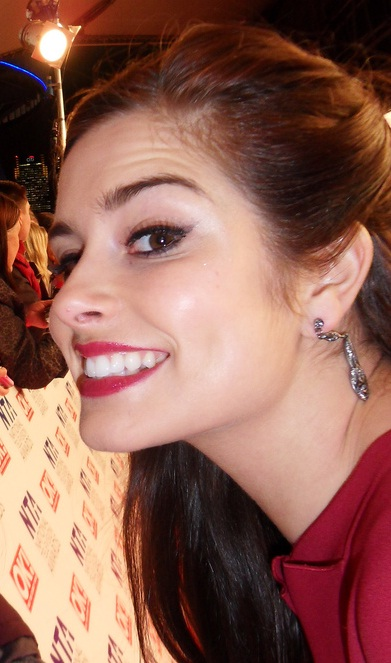
Rachel Shenton (pictured) said Mitzeee "has no idea" Mercedes was her character's mystery stalker.

Mitzeee begins being stalked. Her portrayer Shenton said Mitzeee was unaware of who the stalker was and that "Mercedes hasn't even crossed her mind. She thinks it's a crazed fan". The viewers learn that it was Mercedes. The stalking stopped but later was resumed when Mitzeee and Riley begin a relationship. Shenton explained that the stalker had a key to Mitzeee's flat and had been watching her every move, and said that "not only has the stalker come back, but they've come back on a whole new level". Shenton added that at this point "Mitzeee definitely has no idea that it's Mercedes – in fact, Mercedes is probably the last person that she'd suspect. She actually thinks that it's Lynsey and accuses her, because it seems to make sense".

When Mitzeee realised Mercedes was her stalker, Mercedes knocked Mitzeee out after Mitzeee tries to stab her. Mercedes realised that she will be blamed for stalking Mitzeee so she stabbed herself to convince people Mitzeee was mad. Metcalfe said the situation was born through "pure desperation". She said that "the thought of Mitzeee, Riley and Bobby as a family together was too much for her to take, and she just saw red. I don't think it's something that Mercedes thought about or planned – she wouldn't have even dreamed of doing it to herself. But at the time, she saw it as the only way out of the situation". Shenton explained that Mitzeee was worried due to the stalker so she decided to take some antidepressants and drink wine, which as she states "isn't a great combination." Shenton revealed that Mercedes arrived to see Mitzeee who "still has no idea who the stalker really is, but as they're talking, Mercedes says something that makes Mitzeee discover the truth – and she's totally shocked. Mitzeee is petrified and picks up a knife in the kitchen. The next thing you know, Mitzeee wakes up after being unconscious [...] The first thing she sees is Mercedes with a stab wound and there is blood everywhere. Mitzeee doesn't have a clue whether she could have stabbed Mercedes, or if someone else came into the flat and did it".

According to Metcalfe, during Mercedes' hospitalisation and recuperation she "starts putting it on to get sympathy. She's determined to get what she wants". Metcalfe explained that Mercedes did not "feel guilt at all – she just wants Riley back and she'll do whatever it takes to get him". Metcalfe believed that it was easy for Mercedes to lie; "hence why she does it so much and so well!" Mercedes felt that she had to lie, and found it easy to cry if she needed to, "especially if it will benefit her". Metcalfe was unsure whether the audience would start to hate her character because she believed that Mercedes was not hateful. She stated, "I hope I've done a good job and people still feel sorry for her". She said that "the viewers have still been feeling some sympathy for Mercedes. I was getting lots of tweets saying, 'I feel so sorry for Mercedes, she needs to get back with Riley' and 'Mitzeee is being a bitch'". Metcalfe said that she was surprised by the fans' strong reaction. Hollyoaks executive producer Emma Smithwick also said that Mercedes "gets away with blue murder [...] and yet there's so much love for that character". Smithwick told Daniel Kilkelly of Digital Spy that Mercedes would get her comeuppance for framing Mitzeee, saying: "there most definitely will be a comeuppance. With the stabbing, she did it so coolly and lied about it so easily – that can't last forever". Smithwick explained that Mercedes is "driven by her insecurities. She thinks she loves Riley and will do what it takes to win him. That's what it's about...winning. Mitzeee crossed her – she is dispensable but Riley...well, Riley is the prize. Mercedes Fisher usually gets what she wants and men usually fall in line with her. I want to see what happens when they don't..."

=== Stillbirth ===
Daniel Kilkelly of Digital Spy exclusively reported a new storyline for Hollyoaks as Mercedes and Joe Roscoe's (Ayden Callaghan) unborn baby would die before birth in scenes to air in early November 2015. It was revealed the show had been working with stillbirth charities, Count the Kicks and Sands to produce various ways mothers can monitor their unborn baby's progress. Rival soap opera, EastEnders, had produced a similar storyline when Shabnam Masood and Kush Kazemi (Rakhee Thakrar and Davood Ghadami) lost their son Zaair before he was born, but fans were reassured the storyline had been planned months prior to the announcement of EastEnders's storyline. It was revealed Mercedes would first admit her fears to John Paul and they visited the hospital where a doctor would inform them that their son had died. Kilkelly teased that the storyline would see how Mercedes coped with the situation, how it affects Mercedes and Joe's relationship, as well as seeing the permanent return of Myra.

Metcalfe spoke of the new storyline, saying how "honoured" she was to take part in the storyline as well as praising the writer, Anna Clements: "I'm honoured to have been given this storyline to raise awareness of such an important cause. Count the Kicks is a fantastic charity, which aims to teach expectant mothers about noticing changes in their pregnancy to reduce the risk of stillbirth. And working with Sands has helped me understand how Mercedes would cope with life after her baby has died. Mercedes has already been through so much tragedy in her life, but the death of her son will show a much more fragile side to her character. The scripts are brilliantly written by Anna Clements and with the help of the two charities, I was able to really understand what Mercedes is going through." Erica Stewart, the bereavement support services manager at Sands, said: "We're pleased to have been approached by the researchers and writers at Hollyoaks for advice and help to ensure that this heartbreaking storyline is portrayed truthfully and sensitively. Stillbirth is not rare and it's a tragedy that can happen to anyone. Sadly thousands of babies die each year in the UK. In 2013, over 100 babies every week were stillborn or died soon after birth. For a show like Hollyoaks with a youth focus to be covering this devastating experience is a brilliant way of raising awareness of the issues surrounding baby death among a younger audience who may have not otherwise come across them." Metcalfe later further discussed the storyline, revealing that when she read the scripts she had "a lump in my throat", which made cry and when she had finished reading the scripts, she was "sat their sobbing". She continued to say: "When it came to playing it on set I did minimal rehearsals because I didn't want to wear out the true meaning of the words." before praising the script writing, calling them "brilliant" and stating she did not have to work hard to find the "level of emotion", "The words were all there on the page. I broke down every time."

The week prior to the scenes airing, it was revealed that Mercedes' relationship to Joe would run into trouble when her former fling Lockie Campbell (Nick Rhys) tells Joe that they had kissed the previous day. Mercedes then tells Joe he is not the baby's father during an argument and unbeknown to Mercedes, he leaves for Canada. When Mercedes discovers their son has died, she realises she needs Joe more than anything and regrets her actions. It was revealed that Mercedes would rely on John Paul, Nana and Theresa to comfort her through the birth of her son, whom she names Gabriel. Mercedes would later be left delighted when her mother, Myra returned to support her through Gabriel's funeral before choosing to stay in Hollyoaks.

Following the E4 airing of the episodes, Metcalfe received positive feedback from various fans on social network, Twitter. Fans commented such comments such as, "heartbreaking", "well written and acted", "amazing performance" and "it's good to see soaps raising awareness on such a taboo subject". Metcalfe responded to the comments, by tweeting she was "overwhelmed reading all the comments about tonight's @Hollyoaks and the stillbirth storyline. ❤️" The charity that worked with Hollyoaks, Count the Kicks also praised the show and Metcalfe, tweeting: "Brilliant portrayal from the doctor and Mercedes on @Hollyoaks, genuine and accurate.@missjenjomet." The charity also reminded parents to report any non-movements in a bid to save lives. The show received 866k viewers on Channel 4 on 3 November, with 504k viewing the E4 airing following afterwards. The following day, on 4 November, the Channel 4 airing received 740k viewers and the E4 airing received 623k viewers.

=== 2018 return ===
The permanent reintroduction storyline was revealed on 2 July 2018, one week before her return. The Metro's Duncan Lindsay reported that Mercedes would arrive in the village with her son Bobby and place him in the care of Cleo before quickly leaving once again. When Bobby becomes thirsty and goes to fetch a drink, Myra catches him and Mercedes' scheme is discovered. Myra then watches a television appeal of Carl appealing for the safe return home of Bobby, whilst Mercedes goes to a party in Spain. Her return aired on 9 July 2018.

=== Who Shot Mercedes? ===
On 20 September 2019, it was announced that a new whodunit storyline for Mercedes. Producer Kirkwood reported that the character will be shot after having angered numerous residents. It was confirmed via social media and that the storyline would air in the coming weeks. A week before the storyline aired, Channel 4 released a trailer teasing the events to unfold in the storyline. The trailer also clarifies each suspect's motive to shoot Mercedes. By 10 October 2019, Hollyoaks confirmed the first three suspects for the storyline; Sylver McQueen (David Tag), James Nightingale (Gregory Finnegan) and Liam Donovan (Jude Monk McGowan). On 15 October, another four suspects were revealed; Diane Hutchinson (Alex Fletcher), Joel Dexter (Rory Douglas-Speed), Grace Black (Tamara Wall) and Breda McQueen (Moya Brady), bringing the line up to seven suspects. Goldie McQueen (Chelsee Healey) is included in the official photo for the storyline, but is not a suspect. Goldie will be taking on the role of investigator to figure out who shot Mercedes.

The storyline commences officially on 6 November 2019 where Grace discovers that Mercedes is the responsible for the hit-and-run that left her paralysed, and the village begin to believe that Mercedes is responsible for the murder of Harry Thompson (Parry Glasspool), unaware that Breda is the real killer. The mystery comes to a conclusion on the Channel 4 episode broadcast on 18 December 2019 when it is revealed that both Grace and James are the culprits.

== Reception ==
=== Critical response ===
Is this woman superhuman, or what? [...] the woman is in on a hubby hat-trick – all in the space of about four years! That's nearly one man a year, but don't forget all the conquests she's had in between weddings. [...] the list goes on! They say variety is the spice of life, though I can't help but wonder if Mercedes possesses secret superpowers that enable her to move from one man to the next, without feeling any emotion for the one she's just parted company with. Take her first true love, Russ Owen. [...] The ink had barely touched the decree nisi before she fell into bed with sister Jacqui's man, Tony Hutchinson! [...] enter spouse number two, Malachy Fisher. It seemed as if these two said 'I do' rather too quickly, but it looked like they'd actually go the distance in spite of the Irishman's HIV status. But throw in an illicit affair with sibling Carmel's hubby Calvin (notice a pattern here?) and explosion, and it was literally death us do part for poor Malachy. [...] Mercy is engaged to new love Riley. I doubt that she has any real feeling for the lad, given that she has more chemistry with his dad, Carl! I can only assume that their wedding will be the event in which Carl's hateful wife, Heidi, and Riley learn of their betrayal, setting the stage for some major fireworks. I know it might seem like I'm having a real dig at Mercedes, but I actually wouldn't have her any other way. I just wish she could find it within herself to really, really love someone – and hold onto that notion for more than five minutes!

— Inside Soap's Laura-Jayne Tyler on Mercedes.

Mercedes was selected as one of the "top 100 British soap characters" by industry experts for a poll run by What's on TV entitled "Who is Soap's Greatest Legend?", in which readers regularly vote for their favourite character. In her book Soap Stars, Debbie Foy featured Metcalfe and described Mercedes as "having a dangerous streak and is always causing trouble or has a scam on the go, she enjoys taking risks and usually seems to get what she wants". Virgin Media listed Mercedes' wedding to Russ amongst their list of "Soap's biggest wedding day disasters" before adding that "McQueen weddings are full of drama, and Russ and Mercedes' big day was no exception". Virgin Media later profiled some of Hollyoaks' "hottest females" in their opinion, and stated about Mercedes, "As one of the hottest ladies in Hollyoaks, with curves to die for, Mercedes has had more men than hot dinners. And now Malachy's met his maker, we're sure it won't be long till Mercedes earns yet another notch on her bedpost". The Liverpool Echo described Mercedes' desire to marry saying, "Mercedes has finally got what she's wanted for so long – a great big gleaming rock on her finger. Not that it matters who gave it to her, of course". Anthony D. Langford from AfterElton praised Mercedes, saying he loved the character and had these affections "Because frankly, she scares the bejeezus out of me. This is one tough chick [...] As hard edged as she is, it's obvious she loves her brother dearly, and heaven help anyone who hurts a member of her family".

Inside Soap's Sarah praised Metcalfe's performances as "love cheat Mercedes", calling them "stellar". On the character, a journalist from the Liverpool Echo said that "she's got herself in to some ridiculous situations in the past, but mark Mercedes' words, she will not be pushed around". A writer for the Liverpool Daily Post commented that "say what you like about Mercedes, but she's good at getting what she wants". The Wirral News's Laura Cox called Mercedes' pairing with Riley "Hollyoaks' favourite on-off couple" before dubbing the storyline "dramatic". She added that the storyline "kept viewers on tenterhooks".

Regarding the feud between Mercedes and Mitzeee, All About Soap columnist Laura Morgan commented that it was shocking that she felt sorry for Mercedes. She explained that even though Mercedes was "a nasty cow" because of the feud she was a "woman teetering on the verge of a massive meltdown". Upon Mercedes telling Riley she has no need to be angry with Silas not sitting trial Morgan said she could tell Mercedes had been "knocked her for six", adding that Mercedes could not "hide anything from us". The journalist added that "Mercedes did what Mercedes does best and decided a randy hook-up [...] was just what she needed to get her mind off Silas. After slapping on the war paint and selecting her sluttiest outfit, minxy Merc headed to a grotty hotel". She went on to explain that "Mercedes knows she's sinking. She pretty much admitted it when the doc asked her if she hated him and she replied, "I guess I hate myself a little more..." So why doesn't she get some help before she totally and utterly loses the plot? [...] we're missing our tart-with-a-heart Mercedes. We want to see her flirting her way around the village again, but without her finger firmly on the self-destruct button..."

After her stalking of Mitzeee, Mercedes went on to stab herself, on this Carena Crawford of All About Soap said the episode itself was a "huge shocker" due to Mercedes' actions. Crawford added that when Mercedes realises she will be blamed for knocking Mitzeee unconscious she sees the knife and "mad Mercedes came up with the perfect plan and we winced as she plunged the blade into her own stomach, knowing everyone would think Mitzeee did it! So now manipulative Mercedes has the upper hand over her rival [...] After all, who'd suspect anyone of stabbing themselves – very few people are warped enough to do that".

Langford from AfterElton praised Mercedes' part in Lynsey's murder storyline, saying he was "loving" Metcalfe as "scheming Mercedes". He commented that he did not believe Mercedes killed Lynsey because "as crazy as Mercedes is, I don't think she's a killer, but watching her benefit from Lynsey's murder by worming her way back into Riley's life has been delicious to watch". Langford said that he was "loving the dysfunctional affair between Mercedes and the bad Dr. Browning. Their scenes are hot and they are so suited for each other. The games they play with each other are a hoot". He later added that Mercedes and Doctor Browning have "blistering" chemistry, saying that he is perfect for a "twisted girl like Mercedes. I loved their scenes — they were hot, hot, hot. I really thought they made a delicious and fun couple. But now it's all ruined with Browning being a killer". Morgan of All About Soap felt that Doctor Browning's act of killing of Lynsey "was a crime of passion, but there's no way Mercy is worth killing for". Morgan later questioned why Mitzeee did not "just finish the job?!" when she threatened Mercedes with a knife.

After Riley proposed to Mercedes, Crawford commented that she does not "believe she really loves him. We still think this was all about winning for her". Crawford added that she is "really hoping Mercedes is found out soon before Riley says his vows. Little Bobby needs a stable mother, not mental Mercy". Morgan of All About Soap said that "the end of tonight's episode was the moment fans had been patiently waited for – evil Mercedes was being carted off down the cop shop". She added that Riley "come perilously close to pushing Mercedes over that rooftop, but that wouldn't have been a bad thing, right?" Following Mercedes' trial, Crawford opined that she could not "quite believe she managed it, but she was cleared of all charges – will the mixed-up McQueen ever get her comeuppance? We'll give Mercy her dues: she gave an outstanding performance in court – even we were left wondering if Riley had actually abused her – so a non-the-wiser jury had no chance against the wily woman". She added that "someone needs to stand up to merciless Mercy".

Many fans of the show were outraged when Mercedes was supposedly murdered by Freddie Roscoe in November 2014, just a week after her sister Carmel died in a train crash. However, Jennifer Metcalfe stated that: 'Mercedes's departure is totally shrouded in mystery. Running up to the week where she exits, she has really annoyed pretty much everyone in the village, so it's 'who's done it?'. The story line was billed as a complete mystery, as the viewers don't completely know what happened between Mercedes and her killer on the night at the McQueen house, or whether or not she was actually dead.

=== Accolades ===
During her time on the serial Metcalfe has been nominated for a variety of awards for her portrayal of Mercedes. Metcalfe was nominated for "Sexiest Female" at the 2007 British Soap Awards. She was soon after nominated for "Best Bitch" and "Sexiest Female" at the 2007 Inside Soap Awards. In 2008, at the British Soap Awards and the Digital Spy Soap Awards Metcalfe was nominated in the "Sexiest Female" category. Later that year, at the Inside Soap Awards, she was nominated for "Best Bitch" and "Sexiest Female", the same year Niall terrorising the McQueen family was nominated for "Best Storyline". At the 2009 British Soap Awards Metcalfe was nominated for "Best Actress" and "Sexiest Female" at the same time that Niall's revenge on the McQueens was nominated for "Best Storyline" and the church explosion in which Mercedes was involved was nominated for "Spectacular Scene". At the 2009 Inside Soap Awards Metcalfe was nominated for "Sexiest Female" and the conclusion to Niall's revenge was nominated for "Best Storyline"; the McQueen family also won the award for "Best Family" that year. At the 2010 All About Soap Bubble Awards Mercedes and Calvin were nominated for the "Fatal Attraction" award in the category of "Most sizzling couple". At the 2010 Inside Soap Awards Metcalfe was again nominated for the "Sexiest Female" award; she was also nominated for "Sexiest Female" and "Best Actress" at the British Soap Awards ceremony. In 2011 Metcalfe was nominated in the category of "Sexiest Female" at the British Soap Awards and for "Best Actress" and "Sexiest Female" at the Inside Soap Awards. At the 2011 TRIC Awards Metcalfe was nominated for "TV Soap Personality" for her portrayal of Mercedes. In 2012 Metcalfe was nominated for "Best Actress" at the TV Choice Awards, "Sexiest Female" and "Best Actress" at the British Soap Awards, and "Best Actress", "Best Bitch" and "Sexiest Female" at the Inside Soap Awards. In August 2017, Metcalfe was longlisted for Sexiest Female at the Inside Soap Awards. She progressed to the shortlist, but lost out to Natalie J. Robb, who portrays Moira Dingle in Emmerdale.

In 2008, Mercedes McQueen was voted number 1 in the 'Top 10: Hollyoaks Babes' of all time by askmen.com Virgin Media profiled her among some of Hollyoaks' "hottest females" in their opinion. In an online poll conducted by MSN Entertainment, she was ranked highly in 'Soapland's Sexiest Female of 2008'. She was rated highly in similar listings for Maxim's 'Top 10 Sexiest UK Soap Stars' in 2012. and in What's on TVs 'The 20 Sexiest Soap Females' in 2015 The Daily Star listed her among its Soaps' sexiest female villains ever in 2023.

== See also ==
- List of soap opera villains
