= Louise Summers =

UK soap opera character, created 2005

- Hollyoaks character
- Portrayed by: Roxanne McKee
- Duration: 2005–2008
- First appearance: 7 February 2005
- Last appearance: 26 December 2008
- Introduced by: Jo Hallows
In-universe information
- Occupation: Beautician
- Mother: Yvonne Summers
- Husband: Sean Kennedy (2004–2007)

Louise Summers is a fictional character from the British Channel 4 soap opera Hollyoaks, played by actress Roxanne McKee. The character first appeared in February 2005 as the feisty, glamorous girlfriend of Darren Osborne (Ashley Taylor Dawson). McKee has been nominated for several awards for her portrayal of the character. In 2008, it was revealed McKee had quit her role as Louise and planned to depart later in the year. She made her final appearance on 26 December 2008 when fiancé Warren Fox (Jamie Lomas) murdered her on their wedding day.

== Creation and casting ==
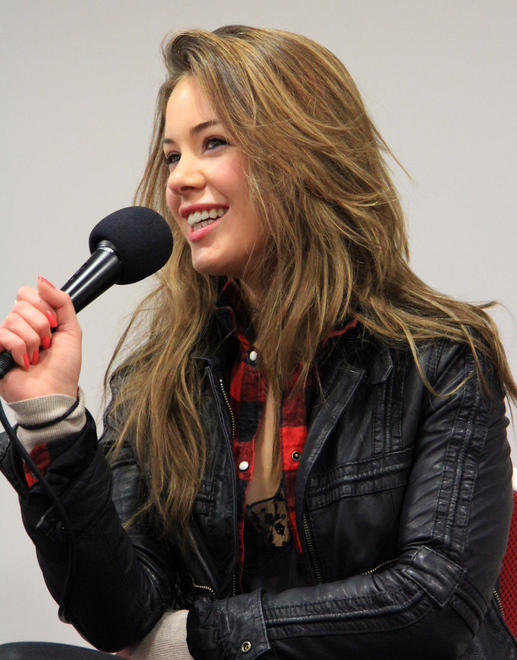
Roxanne McKee portrayed Louise Summers.

Actress Roxanne McKee auditioned for the role of Louise in 2004 as part of Hollyoaks: On the Pull, a nationwide search to find a new actor for Hollyoaks. After being chosen from over 35,000 applicants, McKee began portraying Louise, who was introduced by series producer David Hanson in 2005.

In 2008, McKee hinted at a possible exit for her character, despite refusing claims that she wanted to leave. She told Look Magazine: "I'm not going to be there forever. I don't mind the long hours but I'll have been doing that for four years in October when my contract ends."

After her contract ended in October, McKee decided to leave the show in order to focus on other projects, mainly theatre. Several months after her final on-screen appearance, tabloid newspapers began to speculate that McKee would reprise the role to coincide with the exit of Jamie Lomas's character, Warren. McKee had previously told Digital Spy: "Well, Louise might not be dead! That's the exciting twist in the future....On screen, you'll feel like she's dead but depending on me and whether I want to come back for an episode in March — I might be back. I filmed an extra scene showing that I'm still alive. There are flashbacks which show me being killed, but then there's a flashback which viewers won't see for a while, that will be used if I choose to come back for the episode. I kind of want to come back and finish off Louise's storyline, but at the moment, I might be doing something else. It would be really good, though — I'd be going back to kill a few people off."

== Character development ==
Following McKee's decision to leave, she said: "I have enjoyed my time at Hollyoaks immensely and I'm going to really miss everyone at Lime Pictures. I have learned so much and will take away with me many happy memories — not just from everyone I have worked with but from Liverpool as a city too, which has become my second home. I know I will shed a few tears on the day I leave but I am so excited about what the future holds." Hollyoaks series producer Bryan Kirkwood commented on her departure, stating: "As well as being the nation's sexiest soap star for two years running, Roxanne has worked incredibly hard to prove herself as a talented actress. She has been at the centre of one of our biggest storylines for the past two years and her exit scenes will be a fitting climax. Roxanne is a real star in the making and I'm sure this won't be the last that we hear of her." Louise's final storyline featured her form a plan with Mandy Richardson (Sarah Jayne Dunn) to make Louise's fiancé Warren Fox (Jamie Lomas) admit to the murder of Louise's former husband Sean Kennedy (Matthew Jay Lewis). However, another twist saw Louise plan to kill Warren and frame Mandy for the murder. Despite this, Warren foiled Louise's plan and ended up killing her.

In an interview with Digital Spy, McKee explained her initial desire for the climax to Louise's storyline. She said: "I've known for over a year that I've wanted to leave, so I went to the writers last year to let them know that I wouldn't be signing another contract and asked for a nice exit at the same time. It ended up that they've given me a fantastic exit! I originally asked for Louise to commit suicide because I thought that would have been a good exit for her after everything she's been through. But it turned out that I got an even better exit!" After being told of her exit, McKee admitted, "I was so pleased with it. It's the kind of script that you can get your teeth into. Although I have to admit that Louise has always had something to get her teeth into. It's not like I've been unlucky with storylines — they've always been heavy and quite gritty." McKee says she was asked to return to the role about a year after leaving the show, but she declined. Lysette Anthony was cast as Louise's mother Yvonne Summers.

== Storylines ==
=== Backstory ===
Louise grew up without a father, and only her mother Yvonne (Lysette Anthony). In 2008, Louise's mother was introduced. Roxanne McKee commented on Louise and Yvonne's relationship, saying: "You see a softer, vulnerable side to Louise when she's around her mum. She's like a shy child due to the way her mum has treated her. You see why Louise is as cold as she is." After leaving home, Louise moved to Ibiza. There she met Sean Kennedy (Matthew Jay Lewis). The pair began a relationship and ended up marrying. However, after splitting, Louise moved to Hollyoaks village.

=== 2005–2008 ===
Louise arrives in February 2005 as Darren Osborne's (Ashley Taylor Dawson) holiday girlfriend, introducing herself as Louise. Louise goes behind Darren's back and sleeps with Ben Davies (Marcus Patric) and after being accused of stealing his wedding ring and money from Darren's father, Jack Osborne (Jimmy McKenna), Louise leaves, but reappears months later as an administrative assistant at Hollyoaks Community College. Louise does not like working at HCC as she hates the students and their petty problems. She manages to rekindle her romance with Ben and builds a friendship with Becca Dean (Ali Bastian). Louise becomes an enemy of Lisa Hunter (Gemma Atkinson), whom she feels is a threat to her relationship with Ben. She is proved right when Ben ends up dumping her and begins a relationship with Lisa. Louise attempts to get her own back on Lisa by making false allegations that she attacked her. After deciding that Ben is not worth the trouble, she dropped the charges and left them to be together. Louise gains the nickname "Ice Queen" by residents and an unwanted admirer in Joe Spencer (Matt Milburn). During a party at the SU Bar, student Andy Holt (Warren Brown) notices Joe getting turned down by Louise and decides to help him out by spiking her drink with GHB. Joe assumes she is drunk and does not want to take advantage of her so leaves her on his bed as he sleeps on the couch. When she wakes up, Louise realises she had been drugged and begins a campaign to make students more aware of spiking. Dannii Carbone (Christina Baily) comes to Louise and asks how she would know if someone spiked her drink. Dannii then confesses that she had been raped by Andy. Twins Sophie (Connie Powney) and Mel Burton (Cassie Powney) also admit to being raped. Louise then helps Dannii, Sophie and Mel through their ordeals and helps them to confess to the police.

While on holiday with Mandy Hutchinson (Sarah Jayne Dunn) and Clare Cunningham (Gemma Bissix) in Hollyoaks: Back from the Dead, the three ladies eventually end up at a country house owned by Louise's estranged husband, Sean. They had been involved in a time share scam in Ibiza, started by Sean, and Louise had left him when she caught him in bed with a barmaid. Sean follows Louise to Hollyoaks for a reconciliation. While she denies she has feelings for him, it becomes obvious that she does. They eventually get back together. However, Sean's old friend, Warren Fox (Jamie Lomas), whom he had caused to be put in prison, turns up for £100,000, which of course Sean does not have after setting up beauty salon, Evissa. Instead of the money, Sean offers Warren one night with Louise. Louise reluctantly agrees, under the impression it is Warren's idea. When Louise meets Warren in a hotel room, she finds out that it was Sean who put forward the idea. She returns to Sean, who lies about offering her to Warren. Louise then asks him for a divorce due to his lies. Before his departure, Sean is made to sign Evissa and his and Louise's flat over to Warren. As Sean leaves for good, Warren feels guilty and gives Louise half of Evissa and makes her the manager.

Louise becomes friends with Carmel McQueen (Gemma Merna) and Frankie Osborne (Helen Pearson), who she hires at Evissa to replace Sophie and Mel who died in a fire. Warren moves into the flat with Louise and there is clearly chemistry between the pair. They began going on dates until Louise catches Warren snorting cocaine with Clare in the toilets of The Loft, disgusted at what she has seen, she quickly ends it with Warren. Warren begins to try to get Louise back, however she goes on holiday and meets a man named Andy. They become lovers and she begins to hope for a relationship with him, however a woman calls her and reveals she is married to Andy. After, Louise begins a relationship with Calvin Valentine (Ricky Whittle). Sean returns to the village asking for money from Louise. Louise refuses and he ends up hitting her, which leaves her with a black eye. Warren returns from a holiday and discovers Louise's black eye. She covers up saying it was a burglar, however he discovers it was Sean and he gives him the money he wants. Louise and Calvin then become engaged.

Unknown to Louise, before Sean manages to leave with her and Warren's money, Warren locks him in a cab and drives off. Warren kills Sean by accident after a struggle in a forest. Warren buries him. The police acknowledge Sean's disappearance and begin to search for him. Louise assumes that Warren is behind it and confronts him. Warren denies everything. Aware the police are searching for him, Warren, with the help of Justin Burton (Chris Fountain), goes to the forest and digs Sean up. Sean had left a note for Calvin saying that Louise had taken drugs in Ibiza and helped him out in his dodgy business. Calvin believes everything and does not give Louise a chance to explain. He then breaks off the engagement. Louise is comforted by Warren and they end up sleeping together. Warren admits that he has loved Louise for a long time. However, Calvin apologises, they get back together and she moves in with the Valentines. When Louise forces Justin to move out of the house, he confronts her and tells her he knows that she slept with Warren. Louise discovers she is pregnant and does not know if either Warren or Calvin are the father. She tells Calvin, who is thrilled over the prospect over being a father.

Clare convinces Louise to have an abortion. Clare tells Louise to tell Calvin that she had a miscarriage, not to arouse suspicion. After learning of Sean's murder, Louise goes to visit his mother. Clare tells Calvin everything about the abortion and her affair with Warren. On Louise's return, Calvin is furious and throws her clothes out. She is left to pick up her clothes off the street with a smug Clare watching. Louise moves in with the McQueens. Louise spots Clare and punches her before attacking her in the street.

Louise then becomes a suspect for an attempted murder of Clare, who is pushed over The Loft balcony. Louise becomes worried and cannot remember anything on the night of Clare's attempted murder. She inevitably believes she had pushed Clare and tells Warren she will hand herself in. Calvin and Louise agree to be each other's alibis for the night Clare was pushed. They end up sleeping together. Calvin tells her that he was distracted and does not want to get back together. Louise visits Warren in prison and tells him she thinks she may have been responsible. Louise finds out that Mercedes McQueen (Jennifer Metcalfe) slept with Warren on the night of Clare's attack but is still refusing to give him an alibi because it will destroy her relationship with Russ Owen (Stuart Manning). Louise sets off for the church where Russ and Mercedes are getting married and interrupts the ceremony, informing everyone of Mercedes and Warren's affair. Mercedes convinces Russ that Louise is lying. Louise is then punched and thrown out of the wedding by Jacqui McQueen (Claire Cooper). Darren admits to calling a taxi for Louise on the night of Clare's attack. Louise is then removed from investigation by the police. Mercedes decides to do the right thing and admits at Warren's court case that he was with her on the night of the attack, this ultimately ends her marriage to Russ.

After being found not guilty, Louise and Warren kiss and she tells him she loves him. Louise has doubt when Warren tells her he will change his ways. Warren makes Clare sell him The Loft after threatening to kill her. Louise, Warren, Justin, O.B. (Darren Jeffries), Max Cunningham (Matt Littler) and Katy Fox (Hannah Tointon) show up at The Loft to make sure Clare leaves. Clare then leaves, but returns in secret to kidnap Katy, demanding that Warren kills Justin after finding out he was the one who tried to kill her. Clare ends up going over a quarry into water in her car and is incorrectly presumed dead. Louise and Warren then start afresh.

Louise calls an old acquaintance of Warren's and tells him to offer Warren a dodgy deal. Warren refuses and Louise feels guilty she could not trust him. The police call Louise and tell her they had found a body matching Sean's description. She goes to identify it with a terrified Warren, but it is revealed not to be Sean. Katy keeps on pressurising Warren to tell Louise that he killed Sean. Katy and Justin rush to Louise's flat to tell Louise. Warren ends up asking Louise to marry him, seeing no other option. Warren throws a surprise engagement party at The Loft for Louise. Warren tells Louise he knows she phones his old friend to offer him a job dealing with stolen goods and they end up having an argument. Louise leaves and goes to Evissa, just as Ste Hay (Kieron Richardson) arrives to get revenge on Warren by setting a fire. Louise tries to escape but ends up getting knocked out and left for dead, however, Calvin saves her. Warren discovers Ste is responsible for the fire and beats him up. Louise, in hospital, apologises to Warren and tells him she loves him. After Evissa was refurbished, Louise decided to start hairdressing and hired Niall Rafferty (Barry Sloane), who Warren assumed was mugging Louise.

During a game of poker, Warren bets The Loft against Darren's half of The Dog in the Pond. Warren wins and tells Louise he has got The Dog for her Christmas, however she assumes he has conned Darren into selling it until he tells her he won it fairly and legally. Louise feels guilty knowing Frankie would be devastated. Warren and Louise go to the pub and tell Jack and Frankie they now own half of the pub. Jack is in shock and collapses with a heart attack, but luckily survives. Frankie begins to struggle with sharing The Dog. Warren's old friends, Carl and Anthony, turn up and hold everyone, including Frankie, Jack, Barry "Newt" Newton (Nico Mirallegro) and Louise at gunpoint demanding money. Jack refuses to give any money to them. Warren turns up as Anthony drags Louise by her hair. Warren apprehends them and struggles to get the gun off them but is knocked unconscious. Newt secretly calls the police. As armed police arrive on scene, Anthony and Carl use Louise and Jack as human shields to escape the pub without being arrested. Darren realises it is partly his fault his dad's life is in danger and runs to help, however he is shot by Anthony, who then escapes as Carl is arrested. The following day, Louise books into a hotel and tells Warren that she has had enough. Warren manages to persuade her not to leave him. Warren decides to get Louise back on side by giving Jack and Frankie his half of The Dog. Louise realises he wants to make amends and forgives him.

Louise catches Katy and Zak Ramsey (Kent Riley) kissing in The Loft but after a talk, promises not to tell Justin. Meanwhile, Sean's body is found and Warren confesses to Louise that he killed him. Louise is shocked and is angry to discover that Katy knew about it, as revenge, she exposes her and Zak's affair to Warren. Louise decides to be Warren's alibi for the night of Sean's death, which infuriates Katy. Katy tells Warren to admit to the murder and pay for his crime, but he refuses. Katy hits Warren and leaves. Justin catches Katy and Zak kissing and runs out. She chases after him but he does not want to hear what she has to say. Katy decides to leave the village for good. As Katy is leaving in a taxi, Louise and Warren stop it and Louise violently drags Katy out of the car and confronts her. Warren tells Louise to let him and Katy talk. Warren tries to get her to stay, but Katy tells him he and Louise are pathetic and deserve each other. She then leaves. Louise is arrested as the police believed she killed Sean. Warren gets Darren to persuade his stepbrother, Jake Dean (Kevin Sacre), who has just been put in a mental hospital, to confess to the murder in exchange for £100,000 which Darren can use to pay off his family debts. When Louise finds out, she is not happy about the arrangement and even suggests to Warren that he confesses that he was responsible. Warren refuses and Louise is released. Warren gets Darren to plant Sean's wallet in Jake's flat. Frankie accuses Louise of framing her son. Louise begins to turn to alcohol to deal with Warren's lies.

Mandy returns to the village in mid-2008 and the pair team up and become wedding planners. They begin to plan the wedding of Carmel and Calvin. Cindy Cunningham (Stephanie Waring) begins stirring things up in Warren and Louise's relationship by insisting that Warren was cheating with Mandy. Louise is angry and accuses them of sleeping together, not knowing they are planning her wedding to Warren. Louise finally realises Cindy is lying. Louise gets drunk and brings up Sean in an argument with Warren. Warren goes to The Loft and ends up sleeping with Mandy. Drunken Louise is locked out of the flat and ends up sleeping in a skip. Warren and Mandy are caught in their affair by Ravi Roy (Stephen Uppal), who agrees not to say anything. Louise finds a pair of Mandy's pants in the flat and confronts Warren, who tells her that Cindy had tried to seduce him and had planted the pants to make Louise jealous. Louise attacks Cindy, who claims she is innocent. Warren tells Mandy he wants to run away with her. After a fight with Louise, Warren goes to The Loft before running away with Mandy, there, he is beaten up by Mark Gascoyne (Craig Russell) and left for dead. Mandy is left waiting in the rain and assumes she has been stood up.

Warren returns from hospital to be looked after by Louise. Mandy visits him and asks if he still wants to leave with her. Warren states that he is happy with Louise and no longer wants to leave with her. Warren insults Mandy, who then tells Louise about the affair. Louise decides to get revenge on Warren and comes up with a plan with Mandy to tell the police he killed Sean before leaving with his money after the wedding. Louise watches a CCTV tape of Warren and Mandy's affair and decides to get revenge on her as well by killing Warren and pinning it on Mandy before leaving with his money. Louise is horrified when she discovers she is pregnant. She gets a gun which she will use to kill Warren.

On the day of the wedding, Warren hires himself and Louise a private suite for the night of the wedding. Louise hides the gun under her pillow, so she can shoot him after the wedding. However, Warren enters the room whilst Louise is not there and hides a Christmas present for Louise under her pillow but finds the gun. Louise enters the room and is shocked to see Warren sitting in a chair. Warren gives Louise her present and reveals he has the gun. Warren wants to know why she has a gun. Louise tells Warren that he has made her life miserable and how he killed her one true love, Sean. She reveals she knows about his and Mandy's affair. Warren pleads with her, telling her that he can change, but Louise refuses to believe it. She then takes the gun and pulls the trigger, however, Warren reveals he had removed the bullets before she entered the room. Warren tries to stop her from leaving and is angry that she tried to kill him. Warren is then seen sitting crying as Louise's motionless body lies on the bed beside a pillow, suggesting he used it to kill her. However, whether Louise died or not would only be revealed the following year, when Warren admitted to Calvin that he had killed her. On 13 February 2009, a Valentine's Day card was sent to Warren signed by Louise. However it was revealed that Sasha sent the card. On 11 May 2011, Warren confessed to his former girlfriend Mitzeee Minniver (Rachel Shenton) that he killed Louise. Warren was arrested for her murder in December 2011, when the police discover him at the location where he buried her.

== Reception ==
McKee won the award 'Sexiest Female' at The British Soap Awards in 2007 and 2008, an award she had been nominated for in 2006 and 2009. McKee was also won 'Sexiest Female' at the Inside Soap Awards in 2007 and 2008. In 2008 she was also nominated for "Best Actress". Louise won the "Best Dressed Character" prize at the 2007 Hollyoaks Awards.

Virgin Media profiled some of Hollyoaks' "hottest females" in their opinion, of Louise they stated: "It's no surprise that sultry Roxanne McKee was voted sexiest soap star for two years running at the British Soap Awards. She's so foxy that even on-screen fiancé Warren was sad he had to finish her off."
