= Tointon =

Tointon is a surname. Notable people with the surname include:

- Hannah Tointon (born 1987), British actress
- Kara Tointon (born 1983), British actress
