= Clare Devine =

Fictional character from Hollyoaks

- Hollyoaks character
- Gemma Bissix as Clare Devine (2013)
- Portrayed by: Samantha Rowley (2005–2006); Gemma Bissix (2006–2026)
- Duration: 2005–2007, 2009, 2013, 2025–2026
- First appearance: 27 December 2005
- Last appearance: 7 April 2026
- Introduced by: David Hanson (2005); Bryan Kirkwood (2009, 2013); Hannah Cheers (2025)
- Spin-off appearances: Hollyoaks: Back from the Dead (2006)
- Crossover appearances: Brookside (2025)
- Samantha Rowley as Clare Devine (2005)
In-universe information
- Other names: Clare Black; Clare Cunningham; Clare Devine-Banks; Cassandra Knight
- Occupation: Events supervisor Nightclub owner
- Father: Fraser Black
- Mother: Tracey Donovan
- Sisters: Grace Black
- Half-brothers: Adam Donovan; Liam Donovan; Jesse Donovan; Rex Gallagher; Ro Hutchinson (adoptive)
- Half-sisters: Dee Dee Hutchinson
- Husband: Max Cunningham (2006–2007); DI Alistair Banks (2015–2025)
- Adoptive daughters: Tori Devine-Banks
- Grandfathers: Froggy Black
- Uncles: Connor "Sully" Sullivan
- Nephews: Rex Gallagher; Curtis Royle

Clare Devine (also Cunningham and Devine-Banks) is a fictional character from the British Channel 4 soap opera Hollyoaks, played by Gemma Bissix and Samantha Rowley. Bissix reprised the role in 2009 for the culmination of Warren Fox (Jamie Lomas) and Justin Burton's (Chris Fountain) storylines. She later returned to the show in 2013. Clare was killed-off in October 2013, and Bissix said that it would allow Hollyoaks to develop other villainous characters. In April 2025, it was announced that Bissix had reprised the role, despite the character previously being killed-off and returned again from 28 May 2025 until she departed again on 29 October 2025 during the soaps 30th anniversary celebrations. Bissix has won three British Soap Awards for her portrayal of Clare, and has been named one of the best British soap opera characters. On 22 October 2025 Clare was heavily involved in Hollyoaks' 30th anniversary one of the events was a crossover episode with former soap Brookside. On 10 February 2026, it was announced that Bissix had reprised her role of Clare again, and would appear for another stint, her return aired on 1 April. She left again on 7 April.

== Casting ==
The character was first introduced to Hollyoaks in December 2005, by series producer David Hanson portrayed by Samantha Rowley. The character was introduced as an events manager for The Loft nightclub, and as the story progressed, the new girlfriend of Max Cunningham, and appeared initially from 2005 to 2006, when new series producer Bryan Kirkwood decided to recast the role to Gemma Bissix after wanting to take the character in a new direction. Speaking on the Hollyoaks Podcast in 2020: Bissix recalled "[Samantha] came from a model show of some kind, and that's when Hollyoaks were criticised for bringing people in that were models and weren't acting. That's when Hollyoaks was downgraded and it was all about what you look like. When Bryan came in, he took it upon himself – it was literally like Pippa from Home and Away. She went upstairs with Max one night, then the next morning, I came down. I think they liked the press of it – it was an impact." Bissix had previously auditioned for five other roles on the show, and was reluctant to audition for the role of Clare.

== Development ==
A writer from the official Hollyoaks website described Clare as "uncompromising and direct" and noted that she managed to disrupt other characters private and professional lives after only a few weeks of being on-screen. They noted her self-serving approach to dating "typifies her unashamed approach to life". Another writer described Clare as developing "from bad to even badder", adding that she "wreaked havoc throughout the village." In 2013, another Hollyoaks publicist assessed "who'd have thought she'd soon become a vindictive, nasty piece of work?" They described Clare as possessing "evil eyes" with an "appetite for revenge" which would become her eventual downfall.

One of Clare's notable storylines was a Whodunnit? style plot which focused on Clare being pushed off the balcony at The Loft nightclub and the subsequent mystery regarding her attackers identity. The storyline was called "Who pushed Clare?" in British media sources. It formed one of Hollyoaks main summer storylines. Kris Green from Digital Spy stated it was "expected to be one of summer's most talked about storylines." To promote the storyline, advance spoiler pictures of Clare falling from the balcony and being found by other characters were released. The episodes commencing from 18 June 2007 featured the build up to Clare being pushed. Hollyoaks also released a series of behind the scenes pictures showing how the stunt was filmed. The show released a list of potential suspects complete with promotional photographs of the suspects appearing behind prison cell bars. Max Cunningham (Matt Littler), Sam "O.B." O'Brien (Darren Jeffries), Calvin Valentine (Ricky Whittle), Warren Fox (Jamie Lomas), and Louise Summers (Roxanne McKee). Each character has a different motive for wanting to attack Clare. Max and O.B.'s motives derive from her earlier murder attempt on Max. Louise blames Clare for convincing her to have an abortion. Calvin discovers that Clare convinced Louise to abort his baby, which gives him a motive. Warren had previously been feuding with Clare and believed she told the police he murdered Sean Kennedy (Matthew Jay Lewis).

On 6 August 2007, it was announced that the "Who pushed Clare?" storyline would culminate in a high speed car chase stunt. They revealed that the chase would end with a plummeting off a cliff. A writer from the show's website revealed that Clare's attacker would be identified at the end of September and she takes revenge. It was touted as "the most dramatic episode" Hollyoaks had ever filmed.

Bissix remained in the role from 2006 to 2007, when the character left the show. It was announced in March 2009 that Clare would return for a short stint in May 2009 reintroduced by Bryan Kirkwood. The return was dubbed "stunt week". On 17 March 2009. Kris Green from Digital Spy revealed that Clare could be returning to the show to coincide with Warren and Justin Burton's (Chris Fountain) exit storylines. The return was soon confirmed. Series producer Kirkwood telephoned Bissix in December 2008 with the return offer. The succeeding producer Lucy Allan told Kris Green from Digital Spy that Clare was "pivotal in the culmination" of Justin and Warren's departure stories. She added that it would have been a "disservice" to the show not to feature her. It was revealed that Clare would return seeking revenge and traps Warren and Justin in a fire at The Loft nightclub. Clare returns in an unhinged state of mind. Bissix told the Press Association that "she's come back slightly unhinged and there isn't much that gets in her way and that's what I think is so exciting." Her return storyline features Clare setting fire to The Loft nightclub with her, Warren and Justin inside. She also attacks Justin's girlfriend, Hannah Ashworth (Emma Rigby) and Warren dies in the fire. Justin escapes the village and Clare is arrested for arson. Writers later retconned the storyline and brought Warren back into the series, despite him seemingly dying in the fire. In August 2009, Bissix announced she would like to return to Hollyoaks as Clare Devine, commenting on the role she said, "you really can't get much better than playing a psychotic murderer turning up in her ripped tights and pouring petrol over everything."

In February 2013, it was announced that Bissix had agreed to return to Hollyoaks. Bissix had previously expressed her desire to return in August 2009. The return scenes were scheduled to broadcast in March that year. Bissix expressed excitement to work with Kirkwood again. It was announced that Clare's arrival would cause problems for Mercedes McQueen (Jennifer Metcalfe) and Doctor Browning (Joseph Thompson). While appearing on chat show The Wright Stuff Bissix hyped Clare's behaviour on her return as "extra evil". She told the Press Association that old viewers pledged to watch the show again upon Clare's re-emergence. Bissix added that the drama created by Clare defines the soap opera genre. Clare was only written back into the series for the short storyline as Bissix had other work commitments. The actress later announced that she intended to rejoin the regular cast.

Bissix told a Birmingham Mail reporter that she would resume filming in July with her return airing in September. She said her return storyline was a "top secret" and that "just when I think she can't get any worse, she does." Clare returned on-screen during the show's "first look" episode on 26 September 2013 and was being held in prison. Producers decided to keep details of her reappearance a secret until transmission. Fraser Black (Jesse Birdsall) being revealed as her father was another secret aspect of the storyline. However, Clare was killed-off in another "shock" storyline twist, which sees Doctor Browning run her over with his car following Clare's bomb attempt on The Loft. Bissix described Clare as the best character she had played in her career and thanked her supportive fans. She explained that Clare's departure would ultimately allow other villains to become embroiled in main storylines.

On 23 April 2025, it was announced that Bissix had reprised the role of Clare despite the character previously being killed-off. Hollyoaks declined to release any details about her return storyline. Hollins, who plays Tom, also agreed to reprise his role for her return story. Bissix later revealed that writers had long-term plans for Clare and confirmed she would be a part of the show's 30th anniversary celebrations in October 2025. Upon her return Clare is revealed to be the mystery wife of DI Alistair Banks (Drew Cain). Bissix told Sarah Ellis from Inside Soap that writers had retconned Clare's death via the character of Alistair. She explained that the character appeared in the show when Clare was killed-off. In their backstory, Alistair worked for Clare's father, Fraser. Bissix added that when Clare was run over by Doctor Browning and placed into a bodybag, Alistair was aware she was still alive and helped her. She told Erin Zammitt from Digital Spy that Clare was in a coma for nearly a year. Alistair helped rehabilitate Clare who needed to learn to walk, talk and eat again. She added Clare "depended wholeheartedly on Alistair".

Bissix revealed that Clare had been living under a new name and been running a criminal operation with Alistair. Bissix explained that Clare is in charge of the running of Alistair's operations and assumes the role of "top dog". She noted that Clare never partakes in any murders and forces other people to carry out her orders. Clare meets with her sister Grace who is shocked to discover she is still alive. Bissix revealed that Clare "is quite cold to Grace at first" because she just wants her money back. Grace is "distraught" and cannot understand why Clare did not contact her sooner. Bissix revealed that the story would explore their backstory fully and inform viewers about parts of their history that was previously unknown. Bissix was happy to finally work with Wall, noting she had already left the cast when Wall began filming as Grace in 2013. She added that they became friends and filming their first scenes together was "magic". Wall added that she cried when she learned Bissix was returning. She explained that their off-screen friendship made working on the storyline like "playing best friend dress-up all day, every day." Wall added that she was excited for viewers to witness Grace and Clare's future stories.

Writers also explored Clare's new role as a mother to Tori Blake (Harriet O’Shea), who she has adopted. They told Bissix that Clare would be infertile as a result of the car accident and subsequent IVF treatment failed. In the story, Tori had been in Clare's care for two years. Bissix believed that Tori allowed writers to portray "real emotion" in Clare. She takes her to school and looks after takes on the role of a "normal mother". Bissix told Zammitt that "Clare has more depth now" and is no longer as "stoic" because she cares about someone. Tori is the biological daughter of character Nico Blake (Persephone Swales-Dawson), and appeared as a baby in 2018. Tori's grandmother, Sienna Blake (Anna Passey), is still in the show upon Clare's return, and Bissix revealed writers planned to explore a feud between them. Bissix described it as "a war of minds" as Clare schemes to make Sienna look like a "bad mother".

== Storylines ==
=== 2005–2009 ===
Clare arrives in the village and secures a job as an events supervisor at The Loft. Max Cunningham (Matt Littler) and Sam "O.B." O'Brien (Darren Jeffries) both develop an attraction to her, she plays them off against each other and chooses to begin a relationship with Max. Their relationship strengthens and Max invites Clare to move in with him. Max and Clare try to keep their relationship a secret from O.B., but discovers the truth and accepts them. Clare becomes friends with Mandy Hutchinson (Sarah Jayne Dunn) and Louise Summers (Roxanne McKee). Clare participates in a time-share scam ran by Louise's ex-husband Sean Kennedy (Matthew Jay Lewis) while on a holiday. Sean begins flirting with Clare, who remains loyal to Max.

Max takes his young half-brother Tom Cunningham (Ellis Hollins) on holiday and Clare seduces Sean after discovering his wealth. Mel Burton (Cassie Powney) catches Clare and Sean together. Clare uses Mel's alcoholism against her when she attempts to expose the affair. This causes friction between O.B. and Max. Clare schemes to turn Max against O.B. and Max proposes to her. Tom witnesses a conversation about Clare and Sean's affair, and attempts to turn Max against Tom. Max asks O.B. to be his best man despite Clare's scheming. On Max's stag night, O.B. discovers that Clare is planning to leave with Max's money. Clare plants drugs on O.B. and gets him arrested. Once released, O.B. interrupts Max and Clare's wedding and exposes her plan. Max does not believe O.B. and punches him. Max asks Clare to start a family and she tells Max she is infertile after she was sexually abused as a child. Clare convinces Max to give her £50,000, which she plans to use to flee the village. Clare has sex with Warren Fox (Jamie Lomas). Mel and her twin sister Sophie (Connie Powney) find the CCTV DVD and show O.B.. The three confront her in the pub and order her to leave Max or they will show him the DVD. Clare decides to leave and packs her belongings. Max returns claiming The Dog is on fire and she decides to stay. After Mel and Sophie's deaths in the fire, Clare visits O.B. in hospital and disposes of the CCTV DVD.

Max catches Warren and Clare snorting cocaine, she convinces him she takes the drug because of her sexual abuse. To impress Clare, Max takes cocaine and he suffers a heart attack, which he survives. Clare discovers Max's £500,000 life insurance policy. Clare then decides to kill Max and claim the money. Clare begins isolating Max from his friends and tampers with his medication. Clare takes Tom and Max away on holiday near a lake. The pills Clare gives Max makes him ill and he soon discovers the tampered medication. Clare realises Max knows the truth and throws Tom's jacket into the lake, with Max jumping in after him. Tom runs out of the woods, revealing Clare is trying to kill Max. O.B. turns up, punches Clare and saves Max. After being questioned, Clare is released by police. Max apologises to O.B. as Clare leaves.

Clare returns to the village and collects Tom from school without Max's permission. Max and O.B. find Clare with Tom, who promises to make Max's life hell and taunts him. Max tries to strangle Clare before leaving with Tom. Clare plans to sell the flat and The Loft. She hits herself and calls the police claiming Max has assaulted her. Max, O.B., and Tony Hutchinson (Nick Pickard) physically remove Clare from the flat, just as the police arrive and arrest Max for assault. Tony and O.B.'s vouch for Max and he is released. Max then signs The Loft over to Clare and reclaims his house. With The Loft being run by Warren, Clare becomes his rival. Warren hires Justin Burton (Chris Fountain), who Clare seduces in an attempt to get on her side. Clare informs Warren that his sister Katy Fox (Hannah Tointon) is in a relationship with Justin, Warren assaults Justin and is arrested. Clare then ensures Warren is arrested for Sean's murder.

Clare convinces a pregnant Louise to have an abortion and tell her fiancé Calvin Valentine (Ricky Whittle) she had a miscarriage. Clare tells Calvin the truth causing them to break up. Louise and Calvin on separate occasions attack Clare. Clare phones social services, and informs them of her false suspicions that Tom is being physically abused by Max and O.B.. Clare then manipulates Tom into thinking he caused the deaths of his parents and baby Grace Hutchinson, and would cause Max's death. Tom then refuses to see Max, convincing his social worker that he is being abused. O.B. confronts Clare about the call to social services. Clare taunts him over the deaths of Mel and Sophie. O.B. threatens Clare and is seen by several people in The Loft. That night, Clare goes onto The Loft balcony to investigate a noise, there, she is pushed by a mystery person. Sisters Jacqui McQueen (Claire Cooper), Carmel McQueen (Gemma Merna), and Tina Reilly (Leah Hackett) all find Clare, and beside her, Calvin's mobile phone.

Clare is left comatose as the police question people over her attack and Warren is arrested. Clare returns home to recover, Max breaks in to her flat and threatens to kill her if she does not tell the social services the truth about Tom. He force feeds her food he claims is poisoned and physically threatens her forcing her to tell the truth. During Warren's trial, Mercedes McQueen (Jennifer Metcalfe) arrives and she had sex with Warren on the night Clare was pushed. Warren is then released and physically forces Clare to sell him The Loft. As she leaves the village, Justin grabs Clare and reveals he pushed her off the balcony. Clare leaves and plots revenge. Clare kidnaps Katy and Warren, Max and Justin try to locate her. Clare lures them to docklands where Clare tells Warren to kill Justin in exchange for Katy's return. Warren and Max take Justin's supposedly dead body, however Clare realises he is not dead and drives off with Katy. Warren, Justin and Max chase her in their car. Clare drives the car off a quarry cliff into water below. Katy is saved, however Max fails to save Clare and is presumed dead. Clare later reappears at an airport where she introduces herself to a businessman before leaving.

Posters branding Warren as a murderer begin to appear in the village. He receives anonymous phone calls and threatening letters. Clare later appears and attacks Warren with a baseball bat. She informs him she wants revenge on him and Justin for ruining her life. She lures Justin to The Loft and douses the premises with petrol. Warren phones his foster brother Spencer Gray (Darren John Langford) and leaves a message of Clare talking. Calvin finds them at The Loft but chooses to leave Warren in danger. Hannah Ashworth (Emma Rigby) goes to The Loft and Clare knocks her unconscious. Hannah attacks Clare but this causes a lit match to ignite the club in flames. They fall from the first floor and become unconscious but they both escape. Warren appears to die in the fire after falling debris hit him. The police accuse Justin of starting the fire and Clare confronts Spencer about Warren's money. Sasha Valentine (Nathalie Emmanuel) arrives and confronts Clare, Calvin arrives and apprehends her until she is arrested for Warren's murder.

=== 2013 ===
Clare returns to the village and hatches a plan with Mercedes to con Dr. Paul Browning (Joseph Thompson) and introduces herself to him as "Cassandra Knight". She acts surprised when he receives a ransom note demanding £100,000 in exchange for Mercedes' safe return. Doctor Browning believes that Mercedes wrote the note and dismisses it. Clare goes to a hotel where she is keeping Mercedes captive, punches her in the face and escalate their scheming to secure the ransom money. Clare tries to con Doctor Browning into buying The Loft nightclub, now called Chez Chez. Jim McGinn (Dan Tetsell) realises that Clare is using an alias and Doctor Browning confronts her. She reveals that she has conned men but claims the nightclub deal is legitimate. When Clare reveals her hatred for Mercedes, Doctor Browning realises she knows Mercedes and destroys the contract. Clare responds by attacking Doctor Browning and fleeing. Mercedes changes her mind about the scam and Clare takes her hostage for real. Doctor Browning places ransom money in a locker but Leanne Holiday (Jessica Forrest) takes it. Clare believes Doctor Browning has tricked her and she locks Mercedes in a cage guarded with dogs. She lures Doctor Browning to the location and locks him in the cage with Mercedes. He tells Clare that Tom stole the money and she goes to confront him. Mercedes and Doctor Browning remain in the cage after the dogs to attack them. Clare takes Tom hostage and demands he give her the money, who pleads with Clare that he did not take the money. Jack (Jimmy McKenna) and Darren Osborne (Ashley Taylor Dawson) save Tom and Clare is arrested.

Jim and Clare's father, Fraser Black (Jesse Birdsall), visit Clare in prison and reveals his intention to secure her release. Clare tells him to leave and vows never to forgive him. She later accepts Fraser's help and he buys her a share of The Loft. Clare tells Trevor Royle (Greg Wood) that she was pregnant with his child and Fraser pushed her down the stairs, causing her to miscarry. Clare vows revenge against Mercedes and Fraser so decides to place a bomb inside The Loft. She enlists Trevor's help carry out the attack and allows the McQueen family to hire out the venue free of charge so she can kill them. Trevor changes his mind and wrestles Clare for the detonator, she activates it but a nearby block of council flats explode instead. Clare failed to realise that Sinead O'Connor (Stephanie Davis) took the bomb in the bag to her flat. The explosion kills Leanne, Ash Kane (Holly Weston), and Doug Carter (P. J. Brennan), but Clare remains intent on attacking Mercedes. She and Mercedes fight in the street; Mercedes pushes Clare into the road where she is hit and seemingly killed instantly by a car driven by Doctor Browning.

=== 2025 ===
Grace Black (Tamara Wall) arranges to meet Mrs Banks and is stunned to discover that her younger sister Clare is still alive. Clare explains that Alistair saved her and rehabilitated her health after the hit-and-run. It is also revealed that Clare and Alistair had kidnapped Victoria Blake, now Tori Devine-Banks (Harriet O'Shea), from her relative and guardian Dennis Savage (Joe Tracini), and illegally adopted her. Clare demands Grace return her money, who admits she does not have it. Clare deletes data from Alistair's phone to protect herself. Clare tells Grace to kill their half-brother, Rex Gallagher (Jonny Labey), for working with the police. He agrees to confess to the human trafficking and takes the blame for Alistair's murder. Clare tells Grace that she wants her help in retrieving her money, and they agree to work together. Grace tells Clare that Diane Hutchinson (Alex Fletcher) took her money. Clare sees Warren and is shocked that he is still alive, as he is of her - they agree to pause their feud. Clare goes to visit Diane, confronting her about her affair with Alistair. Diane claims she no longer has the money. Clare then threatens Vicky Grant (Anya Lawrence), Frankie Osborne (Isabelle Smith), and Dillon Ray (Nathaniel Dass) into silence about Alistair's human trafficking ring.

The residents are dismayed by Clare's return, and she has another confrontation with Mercedes once again. Clare and Grace clash, causing Grace to return Tori to her biological grandfather Dodger Savage (Danny Mac) as revenge. When Clare finds out, she hires Grace's nemesis Robbie Roscoe (Charlie Wernham) to murder her. However, Robbie's girlfriend Vicky hits Grace to protect Robbie, putting Grace in a coma. When Clare attempts to remove Grace's oxygen to kill her, Vicky's father Donny Clark (Louis Emerick) walks in. Clare begins a feud with Dodger and Sienna Blake (Anna Passey) when they will not let her see Tori, and she decides to fake a terminal cancer diagnosis. Dodger feels pity for her, and Clare uses that to seduce him. After Mercedes rejects Clare's offer for a truce, Clare catches Mercedes' son Bobby Costello (Zak Sutcliffe) running away from police and offers to hide him. However, Clare keeps Bobby and Jacob Omari (Ethaniel Davy) locked in a campervan and plans to sell them to human traffickers. Frankie becomes worried for Jacob and teams up with Vicky and Grace to stop Clare. On the way to the client, Bobby attempts to escape but Clare catches him. Jacob manages to contact Frankie, who arrives with Jack, allowing him and Bobby to escape.

A guilty Grace tells Clare that they need to hand themselves in to the police, but Clare drops the bombshell that Grace's first child, whom she believed to be dead, is still alive. She agrees to help Grace find her child if Grace helps her reclaim Tori from the Blakes. Clare continues her fling with Dodger, unaware that he is only using her to gather evidence and have her arrested for human trafficking. Rex confesses that both Clare and Grace were deeply involved with Alistair in trafficking the local teenagers. As they attempt to flee, they are intercepted and arrested by Dodger and Donny. Clare and Grace are later released when it is revealed that their paternal grandfather, Froggy Black (John Middleton), has paid for their bail. Grace is horrified when she discovers that Clare and Froggy were aware that Fraser had sexually abused her when she was younger. She later receives a videotape sent from their former stepmother Sandy Roscoe (Gillian Taylforth), given to her after Fraser's death, which reveals that Rex is Grace's biological son.

Clare has a run-in with Darren and Nancy Osborne (Jessica Fox), and soon their daughter Morgan goes missing and is held for ransom. Clare is the prime suspect, and Darren lures Clare into a container, in an attempt to threaten her into revealing Morgan's whereabouts. Clare denies any involvement which is corroborated by Froggy. While Donny is drunk, Clare seduces him and they sleep together at Warren's Wheels. It is soon revealed that Darren and Nancy's adoptive son Charlie Dean (Charlie Behan) had taken Morgan on Clare's orders, and he has become indebted to her. She orders him to steal CCTV footage from Warren Wheels, which has her and Donny sleeping together, so she can use it as leverage against him.

When she tries blackmailing Donny and it doesn't work. She shows Vikki the footage but is seen by Froggy. Froggy tells her he has a lot more leverage over Donny and will take care of it. Froggy then blackmails Donny who burns down the evidence room at the station.

Clare walks though the village and bumps into Tom Cunningham, taunting him about his past. She then leaves feeling very smug watching Tom battle with the words she used.

== Reception ==
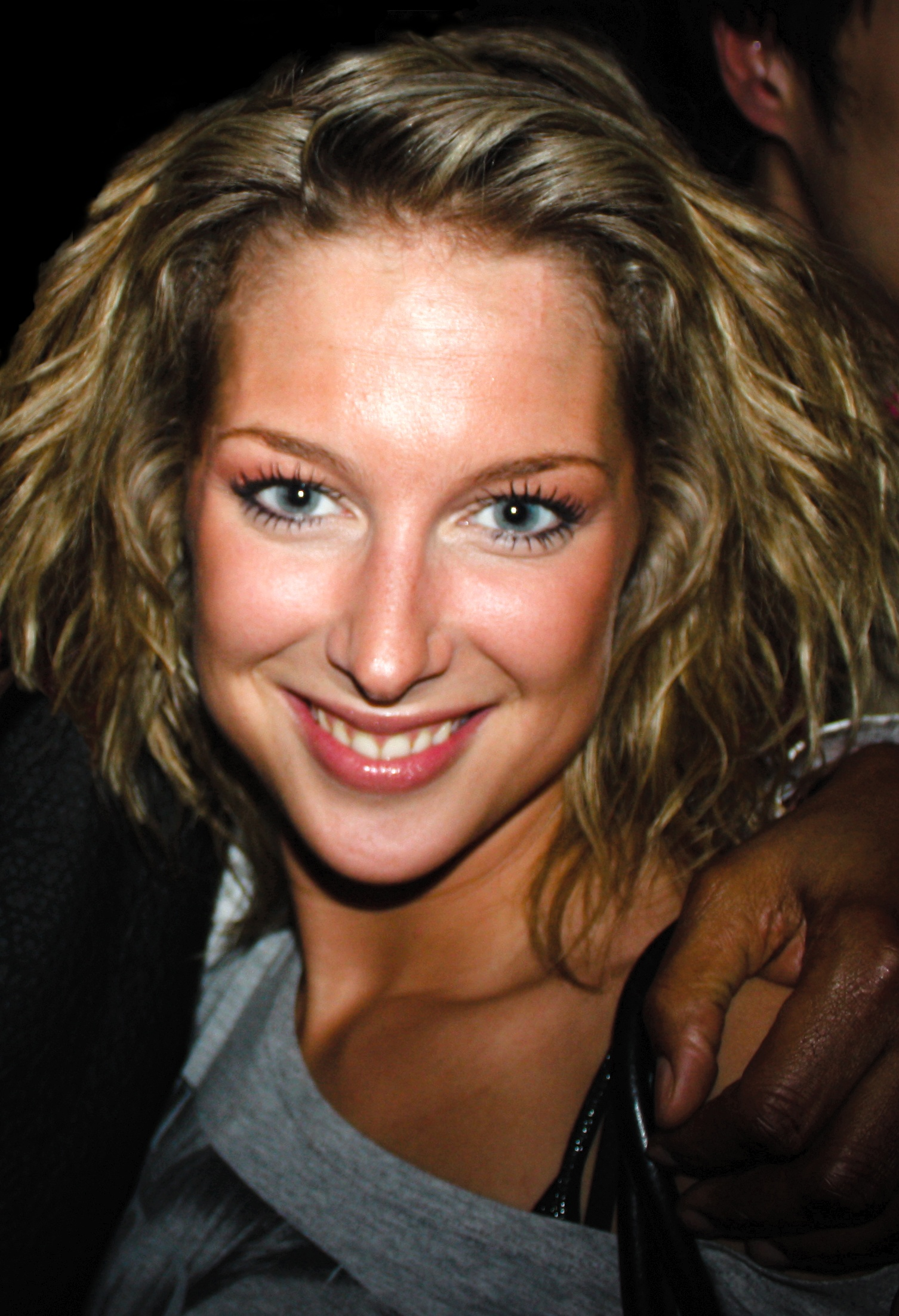
Gemma Bissix (Pictured) won several awards for her portrayal

For her portrayal of Clare, Bissix was won "Villain of the Year" at the 2007 British Soap Awards. She was also nominated for "Best Actress". The following year she won "Best Exit" and "Spectacular Scene of the Year" for her departure storyline. Clare won the "Favourite Love-to-Hate Character" and "Best Exit" prizes at the 2007 Hollyoaks Awards. Industry experts named Clare one of the "top 100 British soap characters" in a What's on TV poll. Bissix was longlisted for "Best Villain" at the 2026 Inside Soap Awards, whilst "Clare & Sienna's final showdown" was longlisted for "Best Showstopper".

Bissix also played Clare Bates in rival soap-opera EastEnders. The characters shared similarities and a writer from The Herald suggested that Bissix actually played an identical role between the two shows. Bissix has acknowledged the comparisons but noted that Clare Devine lacks emotion, kills people and taunts little children. Bissix has also claimed that men are scared of her because of the "super bitch" role.

Clare was featured on a list of "bunny boilers" compiled in the Radio Times. Writer Gareth McLean described her as "Devine by name, devilish by nature, Clare married Max for his money and then repeatedly tried to kill him for it. She made enemies easily, notably Warren and Justin, and when she was pushed over a balcony and almost killed, the list of suspects was longer than the electoral roll." His colleague Johnathon Hughes described her as a "bitchy blonde" and "one of the show's most iconic bad girls who schemed her way through the village." Digital Spy's Green wrote of his disappointment of Clare's 2009 return. He branded Clare as a "fabulous character" deserving more than being "a mere plot device" in other character's departures. However, 53 per cent of readers were pleased with the return. Green also described the "Who pushed Clare?" storyline as a "dramatic moment", adding she is the show's "resident bitch".

Clare was placed at number 7 in a Virgin Media feature about "soap's greatest comebacks". A writer for the site quipped "After seemingly falling to her death twice, it seems nothing can keep this Hollyoaks bad girl down. Clare last resurfaced, in barking mad fashion, to kill off arch-enemy Warren Fox. Now she's banged up, but we don't imagine we've seen the last of her just yet..." Clare was also ranked at Number 7 in Digital Spy's feature on soap recasts. Clare's murder attempt on Max was voted fourth place in a list of 10 top Christmas moments in soap, as voted by readers of BingoDate.com. Daniel Falconer from Female First noted the "villain" was "a particular favourite" in the poll and described her as "one of the most compelling characters to watch in the soap's history." Charlotte Tutton from OK! included the murder attempt at number 6 in their list of 7 best Christmas soap moments. She observed "terrifying scenes" as "evil" Clare executed her "deadly plan".

Writing for Daily Mirror, Tutton described Clare as a "fan favourite", a "soap villain" and the mere mention of her in a scene "would most likely send fans wild". Her colleague Joe Crutchley branded Bissix a "Hollyoaks icon" for her portrayal. He noted that Clare "quickly became embroiled in a host of explosive plots", adding she is a "notorious baddie" who "wreaked havoc". Crutchley viewed Clare's exit storyline as a "brutal demise". Digital Spy's Erin Zammit branded Clare an "iconic character". Tina Miles writing for Liverpool Echo branded her a "soap bitch" and "evil". She also included two of Clare's storylines in a list of twenty best soap moments Hollyoaks. Jessica Earnshaw (Daily Express) believed she was a "terrifying" and "murderous" character and one of "Holyoaks' ultimate villains".

Steven Murphy and Laura-Jayne Tyler from Inside Soap praised Clare's involvement in the show's thirtieth anniversary storylines. They called Bissix a "Hollyoaks icon" who needed to be on the New Year Honours list for her services to drama. They added that Jeremy may have flown the plane that crashed into the village, but Clare "was piloting the drama long before the plane took off, landing her recent exit just perfectly. Until next time!"
