= Katy Fox =

UK soap opera character, created 2007

- Hollyoaks character
- Portrayed by: Hannah Tointon
- Duration: 2007–2008, 2017
- First appearance: 30 April 2007
- Last appearance: 1 February 2017
- Created by: Bryan Kirkwood
In-universe information
- Occupation: Student
- Mother: Norma Crow
- Adoptive father: Bill Fox
- Adoptive mother: Tracy Fox
- Brothers: Spencer Gray (adoptive)
- Half-brothers: Warren Fox
- Nephews: Joel Dexter; Sebastian Blake
- Nieces: Sophie Blake; Ella Richardson; Maria-Gabriella Fox-McQueen

Katy Fox is a fictional character from the British Channel 4 soap opera Hollyoaks, played by Hannah Tointon, from 2007 to 2008 and again in 2017. Katy is the sister of Warren Fox (Jamie Lomas). Her character has been central to several storylines, particularly Clare Cunningham's (Gemma Bissix) revenge. In July 2016, after Warren returned to the village, he revealed that Katy had died from a drug overdose and that he felt immensely guilty as he was in prison at the time of her death. The character made a return on 1 February 2017, where it was revealed that Katy's nephew Joel Dexter (Rory Douglas-Speed) and his friend Bart McQueen (Jonny Clarke) supplied her with the drugs, leading to her death.

== Character creation and casting ==
Katy was created by Bryan Kirkwood as a sister of an existing character, Warren Fox (Jamie Lomas). Hannah Tointon was cast in the role, but she quit after one year to try other parts. About her decision to leave Tointon stated: "It's been brilliant, and it's been a really difficult decision to leave. I always said that I'd only do it for a year and I feel that now is the right time to leave and try something new."

Katy Fox died of a drug overdose off-screen to facilitate a storyline involving Warren which aired in 2016.

== Storylines ==
Katy was first mentioned by her older brother, Warren Fox (Jamie Lomas) while having a conversation with Justin Burton (Chris Fountain). He said that she and Louise Summers (Roxanne McKee) were his only weaknesses. Katy made her first appearance on the 30 April 2007 episode. Justin took a liking to Katy as soon as she entered the village, but soon changed his mind after finding out she was Warren's sister.

Katy received an attempted bribe of £1,000 from her brother Warren to move back to America. Despite refusing to leave, she still accepted the money. Katy fancied Justin, at first, but he told her to stop "hassling him," so she left him alone. However, she wasn't yet aware of why he was so scared of her brother, Warren.

Katy had begun working for her brother Warren at The Loft, but he got angry when a customer tried to get it on with her. Warren punched the customer and told him he would 'kill him if he tried it to get it on with his little sister again'.

Eventually, she found out the truth about Justin and Warren's treatment of Justin's ex-girlfriend Becca Dean (Ali Bastian) through Louise. Although she was disgusted by his behaviour, after listening to his side of the story, the pair reconciled.

Shortly after, Katy travelled to London to see some old friends, but not before sleeping with Justin, who told her he loved her. She replied in kind, and then the two swapped treasured possessions: Justin gave her the only thing his sister Mel had left when she died, a friendship bracelet, and she gave him a bracelet her parents had given her. Once Katy returned to Hollyoaks, Clare Cunningham (Gemma Bissix) informed Warren that Justin and Katy were sleeping together. This resulted in Justin taking a beating from Warren after catching them in bed, leading to the police stepping in and arresting Warren, after being tipped off by Clare.

Katy soon found out that Warren murdered Sean; this resulted in her and Justin running away together. Until Justin found out that Katy had left Mel's bracelet back at the flat. Justin said he had to go back and get it, as it was the only thing he had left. He eventually found her bracelet and ran back to Katy, forgetting his phone. When Warren found his mobile, he read the texts from Katy and discovered that she and Justin were planning on running away together.

When he found them, he ran Justin over with a van, leading to an ear-piercing scream from a devastated Katy. Justin ended up in the hospital with broken legs. Warren revealed in later episodes that Katy and himself had been fostered as children. They loved their foster brother Spencer dearly, but his mother treated them abusively. She would lock Warren outside or in cupboards for days and physically abuse Katy.

When Warren tried to help Katy, he was thrown out, and Katy soon followed him. She then began working in Louise's salon after Warren stated that he did not want blokes 'perving' on her.

Katy was still not aware of Warren's anger or that he was capable of murder. After returning to the flat, she found Louise passed out on the sofa surrounded by empty bottles, and Louise informed her of Warren's arrest for Clare's attempted murder. Katy went to visit her brother in prison, but he failed to convince her that he wasn't behind the attack, and she left, telling him that she didn't know who he was anymore. She didn't understand the person he had become. After Warren's release from prison, she decides to enroll at Hollyoaks Community College instead of going away to university in London, as this would allow her to spend more time with her boyfriend and brother.

After Clare leaves Hollyoaks, Warren decides to have a party, and Katy goes back to the flat to change, only to find someone already there. This person kidnaps Katy. Later, Warren, along with Justin and Max Cunningham (Matt Littler), tried to find her. It was revealed that Clare took Katy, tied her up, and gagged her. The reason Clare kidnaps Katy is because Katy's boyfriend Justin pushed Clare from The Loft balcony, and Clare wants revenge, so she uses Katy as bait in a trap to kill Justin. Clare tells Warren that he must kill Justin to see Katy alive again, with Clare saying she will kill Katy if Warren does not kill Justin. Clare tells Warren, Justin and Max to meet her and Katy at the docks, where Clare can identify Justin's dead body. Clare then turns up in her bright red sports car with Katy by her side still tied up and gagged. Clare then discovers that she has been tricked, and Justin is still alive and faking his death so that they can get Katy back. Warren, Justin and Max tried to persuade her to return Katy, but Clare was so angry that she had been tricked that she bundled Katy into her car and drove off. A dramatic and dangerous high-speed car chase ensued, but Clare's car went out of control, and Katy and Clare plunged into the water below a very tall quarry. Katy started struggling underwater and began to drown but was saved by Warren & Justin, while Clare was presumed to have drowned and died.

Katy is left shaken by the kidnapping, not speaking to people for days after it happened. She was shown to be frightened in her sleep and even after a visit from Max who begged her not to let Clare ruin another life, it took her time to recover. Warren later reassured Max, who was struggling to cope with his own feelings of guilt and remorse over the incident, that he and Katy had no problems with him, and they both recognized that Max was not to blame for any of Clare's actions. But Katy felt she was no longer able to trust Justin after the events of the kidnapping and also because he let Warren take the fall for his crime, resulting in her telling him things were over between them when he tried getting her to talk to him by setting up a romantic meal. However, she does admit to still have feelings for him. Katy applied to study law at Hollyoaks Community College but was shocked to discover her name was not on the class register. The enrollment office had made a mistake and claimed the course was full. Katy was very distressed by this and called on Warren for help who tried talking to the enrollment officer, but it did no good. Eventually Katy was able to secure her place on the course with the help of Louise who threatened to tell the enrollment officer's boss about his inappropriate activities on the job.

Katy's first day didn't go according to plan. She was late when she couldn't find one of her books and then walked into John Paul McQueen (James Sutton), spilling water all over herself. When John Paul tried to help her dry herself she accused him of trying to feel her up. Later Warren properly introduced the two and explained that John Paul was gay. The two developed a quick friendship, mocking the people in the SU bar. Katy later agreed to go to the Freshers Ball with John Paul. Justin also went to the Freshers Ball with Danny in an attempt to win back Katy. At first, Katy was uninterested but later agreed to listen to Justin. However, after returning from the toilet she walked in on Justin attempting to break up one of the numerous fights that had broken out, this one between John Paul and Nancy. Assuming Justin had picked a fight with John Paul, Katy again dismissed Justin and left with John Paul. Katy had another brush with death when she decided to attend John Paul's house warming and Kris Fisher's (Gerard McCarthy) welcome back party, and ended up being one of the many people who became unconscious due to carbon monoxide poisoning. This was due to Jessica Harris getting the boiler fixed on the cheap by Danny Valentine. She was saved by her ex-boyfriend Justin, who called an ambulance before taking all the unconscious bodies out of the room with help from Danny. During her stay in hospital, Katy decides to get back together with Justin saying that she still loves Justin and he is going to stay with her in hospital.

When Justin told Katy he was going to help Nancy fight for custody of Charlie, she talked him out of it telling him that the court would bring up everything that happened between him and Becca. After a secret visit to Charlie in hospital, Justin told her that he was sorry, and that he loved her and things would soon be back to normal between them. However, he has now joined with Nancy to fight for custody of Charlie, which Katy does not yet know about.

Katy has been getting closer to housemate Zak Ramsey over the past few weeks after Justin becoming more distant and more involved over Charlie. In an episode on Friday 22 February 2008 Zak and Katy had a shopping trolley race and had much fun, afterwards they kissed. He, however was left heartbroken when he saw Justin and Katy making up, meaning Katy had chosen Justin over him. However, as Justin is getting closer to Nancy and more and more distant to Katy, Katy confides in him Zak. They end up passionately kissing in The Loft and she eventually chooses him over Justin. On Tuesday 18 March 2008, Katy and Zak had sex and Katy said to him that she and Justin were over. Although, on 19 March as she goes to tell Justin its over she finds he has cooked a meal so they can spend some quality time together and she fails to tell him it is over whilst Zak waits for her return.

On Friday 4 April 2008 Louise caught Katy and Zak snogging in the Loft toilets but after a talk Louise promised she would not tell Justin. On the same day Sean's body was found and Warren later confessed to Louise that he killed Sean, however Louise was furious with Katy when Louise found out Katy already knew that Warren killed Sean. As revenge on Katy, Louise exposed Katy's affair with Zak to Warren. Katy was furious when Louise agreed she would be an alibi for Warren on the night of Sean's death as Louise did not want Warren to go to prison and claimed she still loved Warren although Katy wanted Warren to hand himself in to the police and pay for his crimes. Katy then verbally attacked both Warren and Louise saying "Oh this will be one to tell the children, oh sit down mummy and daddy want to tell you something", Katy then started hitting Warren and left in a rage claiming Warren and Louise were disgraceful and sick. On Wednesday 9 April 2008, Justin caught Katy and Zak snogging each other in the student halls.

On Thursday 10 April 2008, Katy decided she was going to leave Hollyoaks Village for good, and as she was waiting for her taxi, Justin stopped her. Katy and Justin had an extremely tearful farewell. As Katy got into her taxi, Justin told her that he will always love her. As Katy was on her way out of Hollyoaks, Louise and Warren stopped the taxi and Louise violently dragged Katy out of the car. Louise confronted Katy but Warren told Louise to let her stay and Katy had a talk. Warren desperately tried to persuade Katy to stay in Hollyoaks but she refused. Katy and Warren had a talk and Katy told Warren she could not cope with lying about Sean. Katy then got into the taxi and left Hollyoaks Village for good. On 22 July 2016, Warren tells Sienna Blake (Anna Passey) that Katy recently died of a drug overdose. On 1 February 2017, it was revealed via recorded video footage that both Joel Dexter and Bart McQueen were involved in supplying the drugs that caused Katy to overdose.

== Reception ==
At The British Soap Awards 2008, Clare driving Katy off a cliff won the award for "Spectacular Scene of the Year".
