= Samantha Rowley =

British actress and model (born 1988)

- Born: Samantha Rowley; 30 January 1988 (age 38); England, United Kingdom
- Occupations: Actress, model

Samantha Rowley (born 30 January 1988) is a British actress and model.

She appeared on the first series of the reality TV show and model search Make Me A Supermodel on Five in March 2005, in which she came fourth. She also played the original Clare Devine in the Channel 4 soap opera Hollyoaks and the late night spin-off Hollyoaks: Back from the Dead. In 2006 she starred in series 2 of Five reality show, Trust Me – I'm a Holiday Rep.

Samantha was the face of global channel MTVN HD (MTV Networks High Definition) and presented MTV Uncompressed. She has also continued to have a successful modelling career.

Samantha is one of the characters on Channel 4 reality documentary, Seven Days.
