= Trust Me – I'm a Holiday Rep =

British television series

- Genre: Reality
- Presented by: Toby Anstis and Nancy Sorrell (Series 1); Lucy Rusedski and Andy Goldstein (Series 2)
- Country of origin: United Kingdom
- Original language: English
- No. of series: 2
- No. of episodes: 20

Production
- Production locations: Cyprus; Greece
- Production company: Granada Television

Original release
- Network: Channel 5
- Release: November 18, 2005 – November 27, 2006

Trust Me – I'm a Holiday Rep is a reality television show that was broadcast by Five in the United Kingdom. The programme chronicles attempts by celebrities to work as holiday reps for tour group Olympic Holidays. The first series was presented by Toby Anstis and Nancy Sorrell, with second series being presented by Lucy Rusedski and Andy Goldstein. Episodes ran nightly, with ten programmes over two weeks.

== Series 1: Ayia Napa (2005) ==
Filmed in a resort on Cyprus.

The celebrities who took part were:

- Jordan Knight (former New Kids on the Block member)
- Jasmine Lennard (notable entrant in Five's Make Me a Supermodel)
- Syd Little (comedian)
- Jodie Marsh (glamour model)
- Nina Myskow (newspaper columnist)
- Scott Wright (former Coronation Street actor)
- Nadia Almada (Big Brother UK series 5 winner) - Lennard's replacement

Nadia was drafted in to replace Lennard after she was "sacked" halfway through the show for continuous breaking of the rules and general bad attitude.

== Series 2: Crete (2006) ==
Filmed in July 2006 in the resorts of Malia, Stallis and Sissi in eastern Crete.

The celebrities who took part were:

- Brandon Block - DJ
- Emma Jones - famous for her kiss'n tells on Dwight Yorke and James Hewitt
- Nancy Lam - celebrity chef
- Rowland Rivron - presenter
- Samantha Rowley - actress
- Noel Sullivan - formerly of Hear'Say
- Paul Burrell - former royal butler (Rowley's replacement)

Rowley quit the show on day 5 but was quickly replaced by former royal butler, Paul.

Executive Producer: Claire Zolkwer,
Series Producer: Helen Cooke,
Producer: Simon McKeown & Jane Eames,
Assistant Producer: Rebecca Wilcox,
Researcher: Jason Oates, David Smyth,
Runner: Holly Abey

Both series were amongst the first major TV series to be edited online using Blackbird.
