= Matthew Jay Lewis =

British actor

Matthew Jay Lewis a British actor who trained at The Central School of Speech and Drama. He has worked extensively in both commercials and TV. His TV work includes his role as Matt Ellis in five's one time flagship soap Family Affairs.

Prior to this he appeared in EastEnders from 1997 till 1998 as Simon Raymond's boyfriend, Chris.

He is also known for the role of Louise Summers' husband Sean Kennedy in Channel 4's popular soap opera Hollyoaks. Matthew Jay Lewis made a brief return to Hollyoaks in March 2007 which saw Sean killed off by rival Warren Fox.

In addition to acting Matthew is the artistic director of Big Space Theatre Productions; a theatre company who focus on doing large-scale, sight-specific theatre shows in various venues. Their most recent production was Macbeth in Shoreditch Church, the church where Shakespeare worshipped and where the original actor to play Macbeth is buried
