= Digital Spy =

British-based entertainment, television and film website and brand

- Screenshot of the website in November 2024
- Website type: Entertainment, television and film news
- Owner: Hearst Magazines UK
- Editor: Chris Longridge
- Website: digitalspy.com
- Commercial: Yes
- Launched: January 1999; 27 years ago (as digiNEWS)
- Current status: Online

Digital Spy (DS) is a British-based entertainment, television and film website and brand and is the largest digital property at Hearst UK. Since its initial launch in 1999, Digital Spy has focused on entertainment news related to television programmes, films, music and show business to a global audience. As well as breaking news, in-depth features, reviews and editorial explainers, the site also features the DS Forum.

== History ==
=== digiNEWS (1999) ===
In early January 1999, Iain Chapman launched the digiNEWS website, providing news, rumours and information on Sky's new digital satellite platform SkyDigital. At the same time, Chris Butcher launched the ONfaq website, offering similar news and information on the UK's new digital terrestrial platform ONdigital. Both sites proved to be popular, attracting many visitors eager for more news about these rapidly developing TV platforms. Chapman and Butcher discussed the idea of a merger of the two sites, to create the digiNEWS Network.

Original Digital Spy logo used from 1999 until 2013

On 28 February 1999, digiNEWS and ONfaq merged and were rebranded as sites of the new 'digiNEWS network'. More websites joined the network, including Chris Norris's cablenews:uk (covering NTL and TeleWest cable services), Mark Hughes' DVDNews (DVD news and reviews) and Neil Wilkes' TV:uk (TV news and gossip). While the network grew, it was still served from personal webspace from ISPs such as Freeserve, so work started on integrating the multitude of sites into a single portal.

=== Digital Spy (2000–2011) ===
The Digital Spy forums first went live on 1 March 2000, built on the UBB forum platform. The newly named Digital Spy news portal went live on 19 May 2001, running on a custom-built content management system called RAMS (Remote Article Management System). Digital Spy Limited was incorporated in late 2001 by Alan Jay, Neil Wilkes and Mark Hughes, with Iain Chapman, Jose Cardoso and James Welsh joining later as shareholders.

On 9 April 2008, it was announced that the website had been purchased by magazine publisher Hachette Filipacchi UK, a subsidiary of the Lagardère Group for a "significant" sum. In March 2011, former NME and FHM editor David Moynihan replaced Neil Wilkes as Editor.

=== Digital Spy at Hearst (2011–present) ===
Digital Spy logo as used since 2013

On 1 August 2011, ownership of Hachette UK was sold to Hearst Magazines UK, with the Digital Spy editorial team and operations unaffected.

On 2 May 2013, Digital Spy won the Media Editorial Team of the Year 2013 at the British Media Awards. On 3 July 2014, Digital Spy won Consumer Website of the Year 2014 at the AOP Digital Publishing Awards.

In October 2015, Digital Spy moved its content management system from RAMS to Hearst's newly developed Media OS. The following month, former Heat editor Julian Linley was appointed Editor in Chief. In November 2016, former T3 and Gizmodo UK editor Matt Hill was appointed Editor.

In January 2017, Digital Spy was made an official partner of the National Television Awards, held at The O2 Arena and broadcast live on ITV. Nine months later, Digital Spy won PPA Digital Content Team of the Year, and was shortlisted for Website of the Year and Content Team Leader of the Year. In December 2017, almost one million people voted in the DS Reader Awards. In March 2018, Digital Spy was shortlisted for International Website of the Year at the Hearst Editorial Excellence Awards. In October 2018, Digital Spy won PPA Digital Content Team of the Year for the second year in a row.

On 22 March 2021, Digital Spy announced on its site that they would be closing their non-entertainment related discussion forums such as Politics and General Discussion forums and mainly retaining Film, Entertainment and Television based ones that same week in an effort to refocus its website, no confirmed date was given for the changes but the closure then occurred suddenly 24 hours later. No mention had been made prior to that, an announcement that upset many of its subscribed membership.

== Digital Spy Awards ==
In 2008, the website held its first Digital Spy Soap Awards. The nominations shortlist was chosen by Digital Spy's soaps editor Kris Green. From 2014, the awards became the annual Digital Spy Reader Awards, which polls the site's readers for the best moments in various categories.

=== 2008 winners ===
Award	Winner(s)
'Best Soap'	EastEnders
'Most Popular Actor'	James Sutton (John Paul McQueen in Hollyoaks)
'Most Popular Actress'	Jo Joyner (Tanya Branning in EastEnders)
'Sexiest Male'	Scott Maslen (Jack Branning in EastEnders)
'Sexiest Female'	Roxanne McKee (Louise Summers in Hollyoaks)
'Best Newcomer'	Rita Simons (Roxy Mitchell in EastEnders)
'Best Exit'	Gemma Bissix (Clare Devine in Hollyoaks)
'Best On-Screen Partnership'	Samantha Janus and Rita Simons (Ronnie and Roxy Mitchell in EastEnders)
'Best Child Actor (Under 16)'	Ellis Hollins (Tom Cunningham in Hollyoaks)
'Villain of the Year'	Jack P. Shepherd (David Platt in Coronation Street)
'Storyline of the Year'	John Paul and Craig's (Guy Burnet) affair (Hollyoaks)
'Best Single Episode'	Phil Mitchell (Steve McFadden) and Stella Crawford's (Sophie Thompson) wedding (EastEnders)
'Best Pet'	Wellard (Kyte in EastEnders)
'Best Serial Drama'	The Bill
