= Hannah Tointon =

British actress (born 1987)

- Born: 28 December 1987 (age 38); Southend-on-Sea, Essex, England
- Occupation: Actress
- Years active: 2003–present
- Television: Hollyoaks; The Inbetweeners
- Partner: Joe Thomas (2012–present)
- Children: 1
- Family: Kara Tointon (sister)

Hannah Tointon (born 28 December 1987) is an English actress. She is best known for playing Katy Fox in the Channel 4 soap opera Hollyoaks and Tara Brown in sitcom The Inbetweeners.

== Early life ==
Tointon was born to parents Ken and Carol on 28 December 1987. She and her actress sister Kara (born 1983) were brought up in Leigh-on-Sea and attended St Michael's School, Leigh, and St Hilda's School in Westcliff-on-Sea.

== Career ==
Tointon's first appearance on television was in the CBBC sitcom Kerching!, where she played Tamsin, the love interest of the main character Taj Lewis. Her next role was in the series Star 2003 where she played the character Billie. Following this, she played Celina Johnson in the British police drama series The Bill. She also portrayed Casey in the horror film The Children.

In 2006, she appeared in the television series Murder City, where she played Bethany Williams in the episode "Just Seventeen". She also appeared in Dream Team as Savannah Caskey. She then went on to appear in New Tricks, and had an uncredited part in the film Just My Luck as a concert goer, along with sister Kara. In early 2007, she appeared as Annabelle in Genie in the House, and also played Maxine Brogan in Doctors.

Tointon is best known for her appearance on the Channel 4 soap opera Hollyoaks. She made her first appearance on 30 April 2007, playing Katy Fox, younger sister of Warren Fox. Outside of Hollyoaks, she is close friends with Jamie Lomas (Warren Fox), Chris Fountain (Justin Burton), Roxanne McKee (Louise Summers) and Kent Riley (Zak Ramsey). It was announced on 3 November 2007 that Tointon had quit Hollyoaks to try new things, and that she will have played the character of Katy Fox for a year. She said that her intention was always to stay just for a year.

On 11 November 2008, she appeared in the role of an agoraphobic student named Emma Lewis in Doctors, a separate character to her previous Doctors stint. She also starred in The Children, a horror film which co-starred Jeremy Sheffield, which was released in late 2008.

In April 2010, Tointon appeared in the Cornetto Enigma TV advertisement. She appeared as Simon's girlfriend Tara, in Series 3 of the Channel 4 sitcom The Inbetweeners. Filming in spring 2010, she appeared from the second episode to the fourth. In March 2012, it was announced that Tointon would star in the forthcoming ITV2 supernatural drama Switch. In July 2012, she played a character called Frog in an episode of the E4 series The Midnight Beast, where she was Dru's girlfriend. She played Kuji in the Sinbad episode titled Kuji. Also in 2012, she played the role of Kiki Delaine in The Hour. Since 2014, Tointon has appeared as Maud Gunneson in the British-American horror series Penny Dreadful.

In September 2017, it was announced that she would be appearing in a new production of Strangers on a Train. The production was expected to tour from 5 January to 31 March 2018. In October 2019 it was announced that Tointon would take over the role of Dawn in the West End production of Waitress from 2 December 2019.

In June 2022, she appeared as Rachel Saunders in the science fiction horror TV adaptation of The Midwich Cuckoos by John Wyndham. This series was broadcast on Sky Max on 2 June 2022.

In January 2026, she appeared as Joy in the Channel 4 detective drama television series Patience.

== Personal life ==
Tointon moved in with fellow actor Joe Thomas in 2012, after they met working on The Inbetweeners. The couple became engaged in 2017 and are currently living in London. In October 2022, they announced the birth of their first child.

== Filmography ==
Film roles
Year	Title	Role	Notes
2008	The Children	Casey	
2010	The Lost Future	Giselle	
2013	Young, High and Dead	Katy	
2014	Walking with the Enemy	Hannah Schoen	
2015	Captain Webb	Madeline Chaddock	
2018	The Festival	Caitlin	
2026	The Inbetweeners 3	Tara	

Television roles
Year	Title	Role	Notes
2003	Star	Billie	
2003–2006	Kerching!	Tamsin	Main role (20 episodes)
2005	The Bill	Celina Johnson	Episode: "335"
2005–2006	Dream Team	Savannah Caskey	Recurring role (8 episodes)
2006	Murder City	Bethany Williams	Episode: "Just Seventeen"
2006	New Tricks	Young Anita Walsh	Episode: "Dockers"
2006	Genie in the House	Annabelle Scott	Episodes: "Teacher Adil", "Rock Me Amadeus", "I Love Adil"
2007	Doctors	Maxine Brogan	Episode: "Heart of the Matter"
2007–2008, 2017	Hollyoaks	Katy Fox	Regular role (85 episodes)
2008	Doctors	Emma Lewis	Episode: "Safe Haven"
2010	The Inbetweeners	Tara Brown	Episodes: "The Gig and the Girlfriend", "Will's Dilemma", "Trip to Warwick"
2012	Sinbad	Kuji	Episode: "Kuji"
2012	The Midnight Beast	Frog	Episode: "Hey Ladies"
2012	Switch	Hannah Bright	Main role (6 episodes)
2012	The Hour	Kiki Delaine	Recurring role (6 episodes)
2013	Love Matters	Donna	
2013	Midsomer Murders	Pippa Fergus-Johnson	Episode: "The Christmas Haunting"
2014	Death in Paradise	Susie Jenkins	Episode: 3.2
2014	Call the Midwife	Kathleen Baker	Episode: 3.3
2014	Penny Dreadful	Maud Gunneson	Recurring role (4 episodes)
2015–2016	Mr Selfridge	Violette Selfridge	Main role (series 3)
2022	The Midwich Cuckoos	Rachel Saunders	Main role
2026	Patience	Joy	Recurring role (3 episodes)

== Awards and nominations ==
Awards and nominations for Hannah Tointon
Year	Award	Category	Work	Result	Refs
2008	The British Soap Awards	Most Spectacular Scene of the Year: Justin Run Over shared with Chris Fountain (Justin Burton)	Katy Fox in Hollyoaks	Nominated	
2008	The British Soap Awards	Most Spectacular Scene of the Year: Car over the Cliff shared with Chris Fountain (Justin Burton), Jamie Lomas (Warren Fox), Matt Littler (Max Cunningham) and Gemma Bissix (Clare Cunningham)	Katy Fox in Hollyoaks	Won	
