= Chris Fountain =

English actor

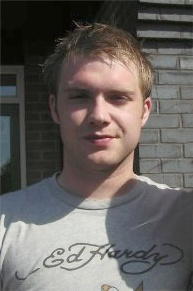
- Chris Fountain in 2011
- Born: Christopher Ryan Fountain; 3 September 1987 (age 38); Bradford, West Yorkshire, England
- Occupations: Actor, DJ
- Years active: 2001–2013; 2016–present
- Television: Emmerdale (2002); Hollyoaks (2003–2009); Dancing on Ice (2008); Coronation Street (2011–2013); Girlfriends (2018)

Christopher Ryan Fountain (born 3 September 1987) is an English actor. He is known for his roles as Justin Burton in Hollyoaks and Tommy Duckworth in Coronation Street.

== Early life ==
Fountain was born in the West Yorkshire city of Bradford on 3 September 1987 and grew up in the Wibsey area.

== Career ==
Fountain first came to prominence in 2003, when he joined the Channel 4 soap series Hollyoaks, in the role of Justin Burton. In 2008 Fountain won the British Soap Award for Best Actor due to his role on Hollyoaks. It was confirmed on 11 March 2009 that Fountain would be leaving Hollyoaks. He left on 3 June 2009 in a joint exit storyline alongside Jamie Lomas who plays Warren Fox.

In February 2006, Fountain came in third in the BBC show Just the Two of Us, a singing competition in which celebrities are paired up with professional singers and are voted off, day by day. His singing partner was former S Club 7 member Jo O'Meara.

Fountain was a runner up in the third series of ITV show Dancing on Ice, in which he was partnered with skater Frankie Poultney.

In January 2010, Fountain appeared as a patient called Seb in Casualty. Fountain played the role of PC Paul Tait in the BBC drama Five Days in March 2010.

In November 2010, it was announced that Fountain would play the role of Tommy Duckworth in Coronation Street and made his first on-screen appearance in March 2011. Fountain made his final appearance on 13 October 2013, with his character having an off-screen exit on 23 October 2013.

In September 2016, he joined the touring cast of The Full Monty.

Fountain played the title role in the pantomime Aladdin at the Manchester Opera House over the Christmas/New Year period of 2009/2010. In 2010 he appeared in the new musical Departure Lounge for a short run at the Waterloo East Theatre in London.

Fountain appeared on All Star Family Fortunes on 14 April 2012. In December 2012, he took part in ITV game show Paddy's 2012 Show and Telly.

In 2018, Fountain featured in Kay Mellor's drama series Girlfriends as Ryan.

== Personal life ==
In June 2006, Fountain injured himself on location whilst filming for Hollyoaks when he touched an electric fence.

Fountain was sacked from Coronation Street in 2013, following a video of him rapping about rape under an alter ego called "the Phantom", the video having been recorded years before. Fountain apologised for the incident. Fountain later admitted he struggled to find work for three years following the incident, and that his mental health had suffered greatly.

In October 2022, Fountain revealed in a social media post that he had suffered a transient ischemic attack in that August, for which he was undergoing treatment at the Royal London Hospital. It was later revealed Fountain had undergone heart surgery to repair a patent foramen ovale which had caused the original transient ischemic attack.

== Filmography ==
Year	Title	Role	Notes
2001	Bob & Rose	Dean Gadds	
2002	Emmerdale	Damien Jones	
2002	Blood Strangers	Warren	Television film
2002	Where the Heart Is	Marty Sargent Jnr	1 Episode, "Extra Time"
2003	The Royal	Simon Waite	1 Episode, "Kiss and Tell"
2003	Burn It	Carl, age 14	Episode: "1.1" `
2003–2009	Hollyoaks	Justin Burton	149 Episodes
2006	Just the Two of Us	Himself	Contestant
2008	Dancing on Ice	Himself	Contestant
2010	Casualty	Seb Cooper	1 Episode, "The Cradle Will Fall"
2010	Five Days	PC Paul Tait	3 Episodes
2011–2013	Coronation Street	Tommy Duckworth	303 Episodes
2012	Lemon La Vida Loca	Himself	
2018	Girlfriends	Ryan	5 episodes

== Awards and nominations ==
2005

- Nominated at British Soap Awards in category of 'Best Dramatic Performance from a Young Actor or Actress' for his role in Hollyoaks

2006

- Winner at British Soap Awards in category of 'Best Storyline' for 'Justin and Becca's affair' in Hollyoaks, shared with Ali Bastian (Becca Dean)
- Winner at The Pulse West Yorkshire Local Heroes Awards as Artistic Achievement of the Year
- Nominated at British Soap Awards in category of 'Sexiest Male' for his role in Hollyoaks
- Nominated at National Television Awards in category of 'Most Popular Actor' for his role in Hollyoaks

2007

- Nominated at British Soap Awards in category of 'Best Actor' for his role in Hollyoaks
- Nominated at British Soap Awards in category of 'Sexiest Actor' for his role in Hollyoaks

2008

- Winner at British Soap Awards in category of 'Best Actor' for his role in Hollyoaks
- Winner at British Soap Awards in category of 'Most Spectacular Scene of the Year' for 'Car Over Cliff', shared with Hannah Tointon (Katy Fox), Jamie Lomas (Warren Fox), Matt Littler (Max Cunningham) and Gemma Bissix (Clare Cunningham).
- Nominated at British Soap Awards in category for 'Most Spectacular Scene of the Year' for 'Justin Run Over', shared with Hannah Tointon (Katy Fox)

2012

- Nominated at National Television Awards for 'Best Newcomer' for his role in Coronation Street
- Nominated at British Soap Awards for 'Sexiest Male', but lost out to Scott Maslen, who plays Jack Branning in the soap EastEnders.

In July 2012, Fountain made the shortlist for Best Actor on the TV choice awards. He was also up for Sexiest Male for the Inside Soap Awards.
