= Jamie Lomas =

English actor (born 1975)

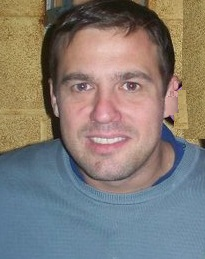
- Lomas in 2011
- Born: James Lomas
- Occupation: Actor
- Years active: 1999–present
- Spouse: Kym Marsh (m. 2012; div. 2014)
- Children: 2
- Relatives: Charley Webb (sister); Matthew Wolfenden (Former brother-in-law)

James Lomas is an English actor, known for his soap opera roles as Warren Fox in Hollyoaks and Jake Stone in EastEnders.

== Career ==
Before joining Hollyoaks in 2006, Lomas had minor roles in Heartbeat playing Craig Harker in 2005 and in Casualty playing Nathan Simmonds in 2005. Lomas left Hollyoaks in 2011.

Lomas made a full-time return to Hollyoaks in May 2016, before he departed again in November 2017. He made a one-off appearance in May 2018 and again in July 2019, before making a full-time return in January 2020 until leaving once again in 2024. Lomas was also on the seventeenth series of I'm a Celebrity...Get Me Out of Here! and finished in second place.

== Personal life ==
Lomas and singer and actress Kym Marsh announced their relationship in July 2008. In December 2008, Lomas and Marsh announced they were expecting a baby together, due in the summer of 2009. On 12 February 2009, Marsh released a statement on behalf of the couple, announcing their son, Archie Jay Lomas, had been born 18 weeks early on 11 February, and had died moments after birth. In 2011, the couple had a daughter, Polly Lomas. Lomas and Marsh divorced in 2014 after Marsh had an affair with Coronation Street co-star Oliver Mellor.

In December 2020, he announced that despite being asymptomatic, he had tested positive for COVID-19 and canceled his appearance in The Real Full Monty.

== Awards and nominations ==
Lomas was nominated for Villain of the Year and Best Actor at the British Soap Awards in 2007, 2008 and 2009. As well as this, he was also nominated for Sexiest Male in 2007 and 2008. Lomas, alongside Gemma Bissix, Hannah Tointon and Chris Fountain, won the award for Most Spectacular Scene in 2008 for Clare Devine driving off a cliff. He was also nominated for Best Actor for his role as Warren Fox since returning at the 2017 British Soap Awards.

In July 2024, Lomas won Best Actor in a Television series for his portrayal of Warren at the 2024 National Film Awards

== Filmography ==
=== Film ===
Year	Title	Role	Notes
2004	Yasmin	Police officer	
2006	The Wind That Shakes the Barley	British Soldier	
2010	Eternal Life	Williams	Short film
2016	The Importance of Being Andy	Andy	Short film
2017	The Decision	Kingpin	
2021	The Pebble and the Boy	Deano	

=== Television ===
Year	Title	Role	Notes
2002	Coronation Street	PC Stubbs	1 episode
2002	Brookside	Matt Evans	7 episodes
2004	Coronation Street	Jeff	1 episode
2005	Heartbeat	Craig Harker	1 episode
2005	Casualty	Nathan Simmonds	1 episode
2005–2006	Dream Team	Alex Dempsey	31 episodes
2006–2011, 2016–Present	Hollyoaks	Warren Fox	1,000+ episodes
2010	Casualty	Barry Southern	1 episode
2011	Hollyoaks Later	Warren Fox	5 episodes
2013–2015	EastEnders	Jake Stone	62 episodes
2013	Doctors	Steve Whitehall	1 episode
2015	Stella	Dan Braxton	2 episodes
2017	I'm a Celebrity...Get Me Out of Here!	Himself	23 episodes
2020	The Real Full Monty on Ice	Participant	2 episodes
2020	Next Door	Robert	
2025	Celebrity MasterChef	Contestant	Series 20
