= Darlene Taylor (Hollyoaks) =

UK soap opera character, created 2003

- Hollyoaks character
- Portrayed by: Sarah Lawrence
- Duration: 2003–2006
- First appearance: 4 November 2003
- Last appearance: 24 February 2006
- Introduced by: Jo Hallows
In-universe information
- Occupation: Student
- Father: Richard Taylor
- Mother: Karen Taylor
- Brothers: Ali Taylor; Ethan Taylor
- Sisters: Georgina Taylor

Darlene Taylor is a fictional character from the British soap opera Hollyoaks, played by Sarah Lawrence between 2003 and 2006.

== Casting ==
Lawrence's casting was publicised on 14 October 2003. She was cast as Darlene after appearing in fellow Mersey Television production Grange Hill in 2003. Lawrence revealed she regularly watched Hollyoaks, including episodes she appeared in as Darlene. Lawrence added that this helped her to critique her own acting techniques and look for ways to improve her portrayal.

== Development ==
Darlene was introduced as part of the show's new family, the Taylor-Burtons. It consisted of Darlene, her brother Ali Taylor (Luti Fagbenle) and her father, Richard Taylor (Richard Calkin). They were joined by Richard's fiancée Liz Burton (Andrée Bernard) and her children Justin Burton (Chris Fountain), Sophie Burton (Connie Powney) and Mel Burton (Cassie Powney). Darlene was described as "a teenager with attitude" who thinks "life is one big bore". Darlene is unhappy about her parents divorce and the fact they have moved on with new partners. Writers gave Darlene the nickname "Lene" which other characters refer to her as.

A Hollyoaks publicist described Darlene as "the archetypal moody teenager, Darlene refuses to compromise for anyone." Darlene is portrayed as an "intelligent" character but her moodiness alienates other characters. They added that Darlene "revels in angst-filled melodrama, and making waves." Lawrence enjoyed playing Darlene because she is "very interesting" and "very controversial". Darlene was portrayed as aged seventeen when she was introduced into the series. Lawrence believed that writers transformed Darlene personality over two years. She noted that Darlene was originally an attention-seeker and "a brat". She was very loud and opinionated." Lawrence noted that Darlene's young age was the cause of her brattish behaviour because it is "one of the most difficult, selfish ages." She added that Darlene eventually became "more aware of things around her. She's acting more like an adult." She also likened Darlene to the fellow Hollyoaks character, O.B. (Darren Jeffries) because "she's very smart but doesn't seem to need to work to get good grades."

Lawrence claimed that Darlene never fitted well within the Hollyoaks universe because there were few characters similar to her age. This caused writers to continually portray Darlene at odds with other characters. Lawrence believed that subsequently writers partnered with Darlene with Craig Dean (Guy Burnet). She also feels at odds with who to spend time with in her family as her siblings are both younger and older than her. Lawrence added "I don't think she actually has a place, and I don't think she feels like she does."

One of Darlene's early storylines writers showcased her manipulative persona in aired in May 2004. Darlene decides to try and break-up her father's marriage to Liz. Darlene convinces her friend, Natalie Osborne (Tiffany Mulheron) that Richard is attracted to her. She creates a "honey trap" style scenario in which to trap her own father with Natalie. Darlene then convinces Liz to accompany her so they walk in on Richard and Natalie. He does not reciprocate Natalie's sexual advances but Liz presumes her husband has been unfaithful. She throws Richard out of the family home and ends their marriage. Darlene is happy to succeed but her brother, Ali forces Darlene to confess to concocting the scam.

One of the characters most notable storylines was her falling through a glass window. To film the scenes, production hired a stunt double to film the action sequence through the glass. It was then actually Lawrence filmed falling to the floor. She then had crew members covering her in faux glass which still made her panic because of it seemed real. Lawrence was shocked by how much preparation was required for the stunt and claimed it took ages to sequence. Lawrence felt sympathetic towards her character following the glass accident. She explained that Darlene did not want people to feel sorry for her following her injuries. As Lawrence noted, writers changed "people's attitudes towards her changed overnight and she started being treated with kid gloves."

The story was used to portray the issue of facial scarring as Darlene recovers from her injuries. Fountain A show publicist told Inside Soap that Darlene would "struggle to come to terms with her scars". Justin thinks he is reformed character. But writers portray Darlene as reluctant to even leave her bedroom, Justin realises the full extent of the damage he has caused Darlene.

Writers also featured Darlene and her brother, Ali in a racism and bullying storyline. It featured the siblings being racially targeted by Stephen "Macki" Mackintosh (Paul Holowaty).

== Storylines ==
The archetypal moody teenager had to move in with her father's partner Liz and her children. Darlene found it difficult and did not get along with Liz or her son Justin. Darlene refused to compromise and tried often enough to split her father and Liz's relationship up. No matter how hard Darlene tried, her plans backfired when her father and Liz wed and Darlene had to live with this. Things got worse when Justin found out his dad had committed suicide rather than had a heart attack like his mother had told him. This made Justin turn to drugs and Darlene was angry that Liz couldn't control him. However, Darlene faced the shock of her life on her 18th birthday when out of control Justin ended up pushing Darlene through a glass window. This left her with scars on her face that she found difficult to deal with and left her angry at Justin. Afterwards, Darlene never attended school or faced the outside world. However, with her father, Liz and her good friend Craig supporting her, the pair both managed to arrange for Darlene to have plastic surgery for the scars on her face. After returning, Darlene had seen that Justin had changed after being sent into a boot camp and forgave him.

However, things went from bad to worse for Darlene when both she and Ali were being bullied at school by racist thug Macki. Macki was easier on Darlene as he found her attractive, but treated Ali horribly. It ended up in a tragedy when Ali stabbed Macki and later was run over by a car resulting in the deaths of both Ali and Macki. The blame for Macki's death went on Justin and he faced a tough trial where Darlene's testimony was to be crucial. Despite the fact that at first she blamed Justin for the death of her brother (as Macki used to be his friend, when he was on drugs), she eventually realised that Justin was innocent and decided to give evidence for him. She told the jury that Macki had bullied Ali so badly that it was possible that he could have reached a breaking point and fought back.

Through those difficult times, she also lost her father who moved out of the house after Liz discovered that he had been having an affair. Instead of going with her father, she stayed with the Burtons and Liz. Justin and the twins made it clear they thought of Darlene as part of their family. She found comfort in the arms of Craig but despite him falling for her, Darlene often manipulated him. After Liz deciding on moving to Colchester, Darlene moved in at The Dog in The Pond after convincing to Craig that Liz threw her out. She caused havoc in The Dog in The Pond after she tried to seduce Craig's stepbrother Darren Osborne (Ashley Taylor Dawson) but then told Craig it was Darren that was trying to seduce her. However, Darlene's games soon backfired on her when she was tricked by Darren into sleeping with her as Craig walked in on them. Darlene tried to claim that Darren had raped her but a hurt Craig saw straight through it and told Darlene to leave. She continued to play her games, this time with Liz as she accused Jack Osborne on trying to come on to her. However, after Liz got the full story from Jack she decided no longer to put up with Darlene's behaviour and wanted Darlene out of the house. Having burnt all her bridges, Darlene then decided the best thing to do was move in with her mum and depart Hollyoaks for good.

== Reception ==
The Sunday Mercury described her as a "nasty teenager". Calli Kitson from Metro opined that Darlene was well "known for being a manipulative and troublesome character." A reporter from Soaplife branded Darlene a "heartless" character for her scheming to break-up the Burton-Taylor marriage. Another included Darlene's marriage wrecking scam in their "stunning, shocking and sensational soap moments" feature. They added it was her "one ambition" and a "perfect plan".
