= Sonny Valentine =

Fictional character from Hollyoaks

- Hollyoaks character
- Aaron Fontaine as Sonny Valentine (2014)
- Portrayed by: Devon Anderson (2006–2007); Aaron Fontaine (2014)
- Duration: 2006–2007, 2014
- First appearance: 17 July 2006
- Last appearance: 12 November 2014
- Introduced by: Bryan Kirkwood (2006, 2014)
In-universe information
- Occupation: Detective Sergeant (2014); Detective Inspector (2014)
- Father: Leo Valentine
- Mother: Diane Valentine
- Brothers: Calvin Valentine
- Sisters: Sasha Valentine
- Half-brothers: Danny Valentine
- Half-sisters: Lauren Valentine
- Aunts: Adeola
- Nieces: Kathleen-Angel McQueen

Sonny Valentine is a fictional character from the British Channel 4 soap opera Hollyoaks, played by Aaron Fontaine. The role was initially played by Devon Anderson until 2007 when producer Bryan Kirkwood fired Anderson. In 2014, the role was recast when Kirkwood decided to reintroduce the character. On 12 November 2014, Sonny was killed off in a train explosion along with Carmel McQueen (Gemma Merna), when Carmel rescued her cousin Theresa McQueen (Jorgie Porter) from Sonny.

== Development ==
The role was initially played by Devon Anderson until 2007, when he was sacked for "time-keeping issues".

On 28 November 2013, it was announced Sonny would be returning to Hollyoaks. Actor Aaron Fontaine was cast in the role, marking his first television job. Of his casting, Fontaine commented "Joining Hollyoaks has been a great experience. There are lovely people here and everyone has been really welcoming." Full details of Sonny's return storyline were initially kept secret, but it was said that he would shake up life for the McQueen family. Fontaine made his first screen appearance as Sonny during January 2014.

== Storylines ==
=== 2006–2007 ===
When the Valentine family arrive at their new house in Hollyoaks village, they find that the Burton sisters, Mel (Cassie Powney) and Sophie Burton (Connie Powney), are still living there. Sonny rudely bursts the door down and threatens them into leaving. Unknown to his mother Diane Valentine (Pauline Black), Sonny deals in illegal goods which helps him buy branded clothing. Sonny's older brother, Calvin (Ricky Whittle), senses there is a problem with Sonny, and when Calvin asks to search his bedroom, Sonny refuses and tells Calvin that the only reason he got accepted as police officer is because he is black. After Jake Dean (Kevin Scarce) kills his mother Diane, Sonny becomes even more involved in criminal activity, despising the Dean and Osborne families after Jake is given a three-month suspended sentence, two years banned from driving and a fine. He makes it his mission to make Craig Dean's (Guy Burnet) life a misery at school, with the help of Justin Burton (Chris Fountain). He accompanies Justin to the Students Ball, which ends in disaster when Justin beats up Kris Fisher (Gerard McCarthy) outside.

Sonny enters The Loft's DJ competition and appears to be an amazing DJ, until Clare Cunningham (Gemma Bissix) plays the CD he left in the machine, which exposes Sonny as a fake. He is disqualified from the competition, allowing John Paul McQueen (James Sutton) to win instead. He begins skipping school to work for Warren Fox (Jamie Lomas) at The Loft with Justin, earning £100 for several tasks, but Calvin finds out and gives Sonny an ultimatum to stay at home or leave the house. Sonny chooses to stay at home after stealing Jake's car with baby Charlie Dean (Charlie Behan) inside. Sonny begins dating his sister Sasha's (Nathalie Emmanuel) best friend, Michaela McQueen (Hollie-Jay Bowes), but they do not tell anyone about their relationship. Sonny tells his friend, Wayne, that he was sleeping with Michaela's attractive older sister, Mercedes McQueen (Jennifer Metcalfe), instead of admitting he was dating Michaela. He also lies to Michaela about the reasons he will not tell Wayne of their relationship, stating that Wayne is still in love with Michaela from their previous relationship. Michaela talks to Wayne, believing that he still has feelings for her, however Wayne tells Michaela the truth and informs her of Sonny's lies that he has been sleeping with Mercedes.

Sonny is later lured to the McQueen household by Michaela. Michaela asks Sonny if he would sleep with her, to which he agrees. While Michaela is searching for condoms, Mercedes comes down the stairs in her underwear. Mercedes pretends to be sexually attracted to Sonny and takes his clothes off. She then insults him and throws him out of the house. On Michaela's 16th birthday, Sonny is arrested by Calvin for shoplifting and is cautioned; he also loses his virginity to Michaela that same day. Sonny then decides to move to Scotland and live with his aunt Adeola. Sonny's half-sister, Lauren Valentine (Dominique Jackson), reveals that Calvin has gone to stay with Sonny. It is also mentioned by Sonny's father, Leo Valentine (Brian Bovell), that Sonny has now settled down in Scotland and is now studying at college.

=== 2014 ===
Sonny, now played by Aaron Fontaine, returns when his former sister-in-law Carmel Valentine (Gemma Merna) contacts him and tells him that his niece Kathleen-Angel (Nieve Grandison) is not safe with her mother, Theresa McQueen (Jorgie Porter). When he refuses to help, Carmel reveals that Theresa murdered his brother and Kathleen-Angel's father, Calvin. Sonny confronts Theresa in the village, revealing that he is now a Detective Sergeant in the police force and threatens her. When Carmel finds out, she confronts Sonny and he asks her to make a full written statement saying that Theresa killed Calvin, but she refuses. When Kathleen-Angel goes missing, Carmel tells Sonny about Theresa's plans to flee the village, so she gives in her statement. As Theresa is being pulled into a police car, Sonny arrives with Kathleen-Angel. When Sonny's superior, Sam Lomax (Lizzie Roper), is demoted to Detective Sergeant and is later killed in a car accident with her husband Danny Lomax (Stephen Billington), Sonny is promoted to Detective Inspector and leads the case into the deaths of Sam and Danny. It is revealed that Sonny is a bent copper and that he is working on both sides of the law, being paid by Grace Black (Tamara Wall) to set Big Bob (Vincent Ebrahim) up on a false charge. When Theresa's mother, Kathleen McQueen (Alison Burrows), returns to the village to help get Theresa released from prison, Sonny threatens her. When Kathleen reveals that Sonny is a recovering alcoholic and she tries to spike his drink with alcohol, he bribes her with money. When Kathleen later goes missing, it is revealed that Sonny has beaten her up and she is in hospital. When Kathleen's sister and Theresa's aunt, Myra McQueen (Nicole Barber-Lane), returns from Alicante to help with Theresa's escape plan, she knocks Sonny unconscious, but Theresa is caught and sent back to prison. Myra is livid when she finds out Sonny and Carmel are engaged and vows to show Sonny's true colours to Carmel. Carmel becomes suspicious of Sonny and follows him to the hospital, realising that he has beaten up Kathleen. Myra and Mercedes vow to deal with Sonny, but Kathleen warns the McQueens that they cannot win against Sonny and returns to Spain. Myra, Mercedes and Phoebe McQueen (Mandip Gill) handcuff Sonny in his car and drive him to a lake. When the McQueens are discussing what to do, Myra forgets to put the handbrake on and the car rolls into the lake with Sonny inside.

Sonny is revealed to have escaped drowning a few weeks later, and is revealed to be working with Phoebe to sabotage Theresa. Phoebe is being paid by Sonny to set up a reunion between him, Carmel and Kathleen-Angel, but Phoebe refuses last minute and reveals what has been going on to Carmel. Sonny later confronts Carmel and drags a child out of her car, believing it to be Kathleen-Angel, but he discovers a doll instead. Carmel then knocks Sonny out and rushes through the woods, just as the McQueens arrive. However, Sonny finds Carmel and kidnaps her. Whilst he holds her hostage, the pair reconcile their love and decide to make a plan to fool the McQueens and abduct Kathleen-Angel, which involves Carmel returning to her family and abducting her. When Carmel fails to do so at Porsche McQueen's (Twinnie Lee Moore) wedding reception on a party train, Sonny lashes out and verbally abuses her. Carmel leaves Sonny in the woods and returns to the wedding reception, but Sonny finds Carmel's invitation and gains entry. He attacks Phoebe with a metal bar and locks her in the toilet, before attacking Theresa and attempting to throw her off the train. However, the train derails when it crashes into Sienna Blake's (Anna Passey) car, leaving Sonny unconscious. Sonny regains consciousness and fights with Theresa, preventing her from escaping the wreckage. In the scuffle, tanks containing propane gas are opened. Carmel then enters the wreckage and saves Theresa. Sonny and Carmel fight, as flames react with the leaking gas, causing a huge explosion which instantly kills Sonny. Carmel dies shortly after from her injuries, surrounded by her family. Sonny's corpse is seen being retrieved from the wreckage by paramedics.

== Reception ==
In 2014, Matt Bramford from What to Watch put Sonny's recasting on his list of the 18 best recastings in British and Australian soap operas and called Sonny a "heart-throb".
