= Craig Dean =

UK soap opera character, created 2002

- Hollyoaks character
- Portrayed by: Guy Burnet
- Duration: 2002–2008
- First appearance: 24 October 2002
- Last appearance: 28 November 2008
- Introduced by: Jo Hallows (2002); Bryan Kirkwood (2008)
- Spin-off appearances: Hollyoaks Later (2008)
In-universe information
- Family: Dean
- Father: Johnno Dean
- Mother: Frankie Osborne
- Stepfather: Jack Osborne
- Stepmother: Michelle Dean
- Brothers: Jake Dean
- Sisters: Debbie Dean; Steph Dean
- Half-brothers: Presley Dean; Brian Bloom
- Adoptive sons: Matthew McQueen
- Nephews: Charlie Dean (adoptive)
- Nieces: Esther Bloom

Craig Dean is a fictional character from the British Channel 4 soap opera Hollyoaks, played by Guy Burnet. The character was introduced as a youngest brother of established character Steph Dean (Carley Stenson). He made his first appearance on 24 October 2002. Burnet has won and been nominated for several awards for this role. Burnet departed the role in September 2007 and returned to the show on 3 September 2008 in a storyline which saw Craig secure a "sunset ending" with John Paul McQueen (James Sutton). He made another appearance after his departure in spin-off show Hollyoaks Later in November 2008. The character is regarded as one of Hollyoaks most iconic characters.

== Character development ==
Craig Dean was not at first outlined as harbouring homosexual feelings or tendencies. The character was originally scripted as heterosexual, and actor Guy Burnet wanted to maintain this aspect of the character in his portrayal. He relayed, "The thing that I wanted more than anything was to convey confusion – if Craig could go and sleep with John Paul and afterwards the audience can say 'hold on a minute – maybe he's not gay'… If I've provoked that question, then I've reached the goal I wanted to reach. If I'm confused, in turn Craig is confused and so is the audience – that's the way I see it."

Burnet was at first against the writers' decision to have Craig become romantically involved with another male character. "I'll always be completely honest," he stated. "I'll always be real. The truth is that it was difficult to play. It was talked about for a long while and I felt uncomfortable with the idea because I didn't think it was justifiable. I thought 'how can you make a straight guy who's a bit of a cheeky chappy, loves the girls and has a sort of camp sense of humour, gay?'" Burnet stated that he sat down with the producers of the series. "It was sitting with Bryan and the other producers, discussing it and saying 'right, if we're going to do this, it's not a story about a character being gay, it's a story where we have to justify the guy's sexual confusion – why is he like this? And the most important thing is that he still has the love for the woman in his life'". Burnet conveyed that he does not see Craig as gay or bisexual, and was adamant on the series not portraying Craig as either. "It was a love for this one person," he cited, "which threw him." Burnet detailed, "Craig was always a lonely character. He never had that many friends surrounding him, even during the times of Bombhead and Lee. These guys were in a different year to him. He was always a lone soldier." Further elaborating on Craig and John Paul's connection, Burnet stated, "JP was not only a best friend but when he came out, it was a coming to terms moment for Craig – asking himself 'perhaps these feelings are OK to have for JP and I don't want to lose him as a mate'. It's confusion but it's also a love story – an obsession almost."

Burnet revealed that his main goal within acting is to provoke a reaction. "...and I don't just want to provoke a good reaction," he noted. "I want to provoke a reaction that's hatred – hate me, but hate the character. If I've achieved that, then that's great. Variation is fantastic." He stated, "The thing about Craig – whatever character you play is always going to be slightly similar to you. Whoever says that they're completely different is lying because it's your face, its your expression – it is you." He added, however, that the personality "might be completely different" and pointed out that personality-wise he is nothing like Craig. "There are a lot of parts that are similar, things that you draw from reality," he noted.

In regards to whether or not he became comfortable with portraying Craig's sexual attraction to John Paul, Burnet clarified: "Even towards the end, it was always difficult for me… You've got to remember that the room is full of people and it's not so much that which bothers you, but you're sitting there and – this isn't meant in a homophobic way – I just didn't feel comfortable doing it. It literally would be a silent set, we'd do it and hopefully it was one take and it was out of the way. That's a genuine answer."

In late 2007, Burnet decided to leave the series, stating that he wanted to pursue other acting ventures. However, he agreed to return to the series in late 2008. "I’ve had so much support from fans since I left the show, so it’s great to have the opportunity to reprise the storyline and give viewers a resolution to the Craig and John Paul story," he revealed. In September 2012, Inside Soap named John Paul and Craig's exit as their number 1 happy ending, "This tentative, tremulous, tortured romance is still regarded by Hollyoaks fans as one of the show's greatest-ever storylines – if not the greatest. So fervently were viewers wishing for a happy ending for gay teenager John Paul and his no-I'm-not-gay-but-maybe-I-am friend Craig, the producer even promised a happy ending in advance. And so, as they flew off to Dublin together, they kissed in front of a holiday poster of a sunset. Aw!"

Burnet's return was revealed on 10 June 2008. The exact date was revealed to be 2 September.

Burnet cited his appreciation for the show giving him a unique character to portray, while maintaining the distinct difference between John Paul's sexuality and Craig's. "I really appreciate the freedom and the opportunities that they've given me to really make something different of this storyline, not just the conventional 'coming out' storyline – it's been a sexual confusion storyline," he stated. "For James, it's been a 'coming out' storyline but for me, I really didn't want to mimic that or mirror it any way. It's important to show something different, something original and they gave me the freedom to do that. I'll never forget that."

== Storylines ==
=== 2002–2007 ===
Craig, the youngest member of the Dean family, arrives in Hollyoaks with his family, his parents, Johnno and Frankie, his brother, Jake, and sisters, Debbie and Steph. He uses his intelligence to manipulate Hollyoaks villagers and to pull a variety of scams. He falls for older girl Abby Davies, as she leads him on, making him believe that she fancies him. However, nothing happens in the relationship after Craig discovers that she is using him in order to make her ex-boyfriend, Lee Hunter, jealous.

Craig is supportive when his sister, Steph, is attacked and is left with epilepsy by Toby Mills. Craig is there for his family when they need him, as they struggle through their debts. Craig's love life improves when he falls for the charms of another older girl, Natalie Osborne, who manages to seduce him. But she wants to keep their relationship a secret and she uses him to lose her virginity. She then starts to lose interest in him, but is taught a lesson by Craig's sisters, Debbie and Steph, who have had an intense dislike for Natalie since she arrived. Natalie then leaves Hollyoaks and Craig behind.

Craig is dealt another shock when his father leaves the family for a 19-year-old girl named Michelle, who he has gotten pregnant. The Deans later move into The Dog in the Pond pub, which is owned by Frankie's new boyfriend, Jack Osborne. Craig is shocked when Johnno returns to the village and tells his family that his girlfriend has left him for someone else, and that he realised how much he missed his family. Craig then finds out that Johnno is lying and that he has left his girlfriend and newborn son, Presley, after he decided that he did not want to be a father again at his age. Craig and his siblings are disgusted by his behaviour. Johnno tries to make amends, but in the end decides to leave Hollyoaks to marry his younger girlfriend after Craig and Jake tell him that his new son needs him more than they do.

Craig starts a romantic relationship with Darlene Taylor. He supports her after her stepbrother, Justin Burton, pushes her through a window and later when her brother, Ali, is killed in a car accident. Meanwhile, Frankie and Jack marry and Darlene deals with her feelings by making up claims about his family making passes at her. This leads to her stepmother, Liz Burton, throwing her out of her house and Darlene living with the Dean/Osborne clan. Darlene starts flirting with Craig's stepbrother, Darren, and then tells Craig that Darren is the one seducing her. Craig then walks in on her having sex with Darren, an event Darren orchestrated to prove what type of person Darlene is to Craig. Craig end his relationship with Darlene.

Craig hopes to escape Hollyoaks after completing his A-levels. He is offered a conditional place at Trinity College in Dublin, but after failing to get the right grades, he decides to repeat a year at Hollyoaks Comprehensive. Jake accidentally runs over Diane Valentine, causing her son, Sonny, to begin bullying Craig at school. John Paul McQueen saves Craig from being beaten up by Sonny and this leads to the two of them becoming friends. Craig begins dating Sarah Barnes and becomes friends with her two best friends, Hannah Ashworth and Nancy Hayton. Sarah ex-boyfriend, Rhys Ashworth, tries to interfere in Craig and Sarah's relationship, but Craig stands up to him.

John Paul is dating Hannah, but then suddenly breaks up with her. When pushed for the reason why, John Paul claims he fancies someone else and Craig mistakenly believes it is Sarah. When Craig sees John Paul and Sarah being close, he lashes out at both of them and dumps Sarah. John Paul tells Craig he made up fancying Sarah as an excuse. Craig and John Paul's friendship gets back on track and they get back together with their girlfriends. At Hannah's 18th birthday party, Craig is furious when he catches a drunken Sarah kissing Rhys. John Paul tells Craig that Sarah is not good enough for him and emotionally confesses that he is in love with him. Afterwards, John Paul tells Craig he was just confused and Craig forgives him. Craig also forgives Sarah for the kiss.

At a school dance-off competition, Craig and Sarah say "I love you" for the first time. Craig gets drunk and tells John Paul he is fine with him being gay and kisses him. Hannah sees the kiss and announces it to everyone. This leads to John Paul coming out to his family, friends, and classmates. Craig is furious with John Paul since by association people will think he is gay, too. During a five-a-side match, Craig repeatedly smashes into John Paul eventually culminating in Craig beating John Paul up. Craig apologises, but John Paul tells him their friendship is over.

John Paul eventually forgives Craig and agrees to be friends again. Craig is not very fond of John Paul's new boyfriend, Spike and John Paul accuses Craig of being jealous. Craig asks John Paul if he has gotten over him and John Paul admits he is still in love with him. Craig tells John Paul that he cannot stop thinking about him, he kisses him and they sleep together. John Paul is over the moon that they had sex, but Craig gets up, calls John Paul a faggot, and rushes out of the house. Craig is distraught over what happened between him and John Paul and begins acting erratically. Craig violently grabs and kisses Sarah, who is completely disgusted by his behaviour. When confronted by John Paul, Craig denies anything happened between them.

When Craig sees pictures from Sarah's modelling shoot, he is not happy since she is in suggestive poses with another man. Sarah tells him it is just part of the job, but Craig tells Sarah that he does not want her to be a model. Sarah refuses to give up her career and tells Craig she does not want a jealous boyfriend. Craig tries to work things out with John Paul, but he is frustrated that Craig keeps denying that they had sex. One day, Craig turns up at the McQueen house, kisses John Paul passionately, and sleeps with him again. This time Craig acknowledges what has happened between them and John Paul assumes Craig is going to come out. However, Craig tells him that he is not gay, not finishing with Sarah, and he wants to see John Paul on the side. John Paul tells Craig he cannot accept being used like that. Unfazed, Craig tells John Paul whether he likes it or not, they both know how it's going to end up: Craig will come knocking and John Paul will be there.

Craig asks Sarah to move to Dublin with him and she accepts. One day, Craig slips away from a get-together with two of Sarah's modeling friends, Evan and Melissa, and goes to see John Paul. Craig tells John Paul that is in love with him. Craig and John Paul both agree to split up with their partners so they can be with each other. John Paul goes through with breaking up with Spike, but Craig makes up an excuse not to break up with Sarah.

Sarah and Craig have a row and break up. John Paul wants him and Craig to go public with their relationship, but Craig is not ready. Craig gets back together with Sarah and they leave town for a holiday without telling John Paul. Craig and Sarah return a couple of weeks later and John Paul is extremely angry with Craig for running off without any notice. Craig apologises and their affair continues. Craig gets good A-level results, meaning he can go to Trinity. After Spike reveals he knows about the affair, he and Craig get into a fight at the Dog, which Sarah walks in on and demands to know what is going on. Backed into a corner, Craig impulsively asks Sarah to marry him and she accepts. To keep John Paul from finding out, Craig tells Sarah that their engagement needs to remain a secret until he gets her a ring.

Everybody is worried about Hannah, who is suffering from anorexia. Sarah and Nancy both believe John Paul is to blame, but Craig does not. John Paul is deeply upset he is being blamed for Hannah's condition. To make him feel better, Craig gives John Paul a watch that belonged to his grandfather, inscribed with the words Love Always. John Paul reluctantly accepts that Craig is moving to Dublin with Sarah since Craig has assured him that they still have a future.

Craig and John Paul are caught in bed by Sarah.

Frankie throws Craig and Sarah an engagement party at the Dog. At the party, John Paul demands that Craig makes a choice— it's either him or Sarah. Craig is reluctant to make a choice so John Paul asks him who he cannot live without and Craig says "you" and kisses him. When Craig leaves the room, John Paul texts Sarah on Craig's phone asking her to come upstairs. Sarah comes upstairs and walks in on Craig and John Paul kissing. Sarah outs Craig to everybody by saying she caught him with John Paul. John Paul admits it was him who sent the text to Sarah and tries to get Craig to tell the truth about them, but Craig instead becomes enraged and John Paul is thrown out. Sarah demands to know why Craig would propose to her when he was sleeping with John Paul. When Craig does not answer her, Sarah physically attacks him. Craig tries to explain to his family, but they are all disappointed in him. Frankie even tells Craig he is no different from his father. Craig confronts John Paul over what he did, but John Paul says he has no sympathy for Craig.

The next day, Craig and Sarah have a heart-to-heart and he apologises for how much he has hurt her. Sarah still wants to be with Craig, but he tells her that he wants to be John Paul. The Dean and the McQueen families have a face-off, which Craig and John Paul slip away from and admit their feelings for each other. The two announce their relationship to their family members, most of whom are not supportive.

Craig and John Paul are happy to finally be a couple openly, but it is clear Craig still has a lot of insecurities. Craig asks John Paul to come to Dublin with him and John Paul happily accepts. Sarah is heartbroken when she learns that John Paul is moving with Craig and Craig comforts her by saying that he almost wishes he never met John Paul. Sarah tells Craig they can still get back together, but Craig turns her down again.

Craig and John Paul share emotional goodbyes with their families. At the airport, Jake, who had been the least supportive of their relationship, arrives to make peace with Craig. John Paul overhears Craig tell Jake that he is not gay, prompting him to ask Craig to kiss him. When Craig cannot bring himself to do it, John Paul realises he cannot go to Dublin with him. Craig begs John Paul not leave and reminds him that he chose him over Sarah, but John Paul says he forced Craig to choose. John Paul tells Craig he loves him with all his heart, but he deserves better than to be with a man who cannot even display romantic affection towards him in public. John Paul ends their relationship and walks away. Craig is devastated and tries to go after John Paul, but then goes to board his flight.

=== Post-Exit ===
Craig is repeatedly mentioned after his exit. Jake taunts John Paul with the news that Craig is having fun and seeing girls. Frankie mentions that Craig will not come home for Christmas because he does not want to deal with John Paul. On Christmas Day, Craig sends a text message to John Paul wishing him a Merry Christmas and saying that he misses him and would like to see him in Dublin one day. Frankie tells the local priest that her son is gay, suggesting that her attitude has softened a bit.

=== 2008 return ===
Craig returns to Hollyoaks on 2 September 2008. John Paul is surprised, but happy to see Craig. Craig admits it was difficult for him to date in Dublin, because he could not stop thinking about John Paul. Things become awkward when Darren mentions that John Paul is engaged to Kieron Hobbs. Craig emotionally confesses to John Paul that he is still in love with him and wants him back. John Paul admits he still in love with Craig and the pair sleep together. John Paul tells Craig he is and will always be the one for him and he is going to finish with Kieron. Craig is stunned when he learns that Kieron has committed suicide (though he was actually murdered by Niall Rafferty). Craig tries to comfort John Paul, who tells him they cannot be together now.

Craig reunites with Sarah and Hannah. Craig expresses regret for what he did to Sarah. Sarah tells Craig that he was her best friend and she will always love him. The two exes embrace and finally make their peace with each other. Sarah and Hannah encourage Craig not to give up on John Paul. Craig gives John Paul a one-way plane ticket to Dublin. Craig leaves for the train station, believing John Paul is not coming with him. As Craig is waiting on the platform, John Paul appears. John Paul tells Craig that he loves him and Craig kisses him, showing that he is no longer afraid of public displays of affection. John Paul and Craig happily board the train together.

=== Hollyoaks Later ===
On 24 November 2008, Craig met up with his sister Steph and Tom Cunningham in Scotland for a holiday at a remote cottage. Craig later reveals that this is because John Paul needed time to himself after going out on late night benders following the death of his sister Tina and his ex fiancé Kieron. Upon arriving Steph and Craig are shocked to discover the cottage is owned by a man called Pete who is a nudist. After helping them settle in Pete leaves Craig and Steph to have a good holiday. Niall, having found the address of the cottage on Steph's laptop, has also arrived in Scotland to seek out Steph to try to make things up to her. He then puts himself up in a barn across from the cottage so that he can spy on Steph and Tom. When Craig goes out for the afternoon Niall approaches the cottage and breaks in putting Steph on edge; after hearing someone else coming, Niall escapes the cottage, injuring himself in the process. Later the same day, Steph and Craig take Tom to play football in the fields and Tom comes across the barn where Niall has been staying. Niall, thinking he has got his opportunity to meet Steph, prepares to make an appearance when he is shocked to discover that Craig is also present. He then puts his plans on hold. Later that evening Craig once again goes out with Pete the owner of the cottage, who also reveals himself to be gay, but Craig says that he is only in love with one bloke John Paul. While the pair chat Niall sneaks into the bedroom where Tom Cunningham is sleeping and he persuades Tom that Craig sent him, making the youngster follow him off into the night.

The following day Steph and Craig are distraught that Tom is missing, but Niall lets their fear build and then makes contact with the pair. He then gives them a deal: if Steph meets with him then he will return Tom safely, but Niall's plan goes wrong and Tom escapes. Angry that he has been tricked by a child, he sets out to find Steph himself, and arrives back at the cottage where Tom has found Craig. Niall surprises the pair and ties Craig up and locks Tom in another room. Steph then returns and is shocked to be face to face with Niall. They then talk to each other with Niall desperate for her to love him. Steph then goes along with his plans for them to play happy families, despite her brother and Tom being locked away. Niall then goes upstairs to talk to Tom about how he would feel if he and Steph become his parents and then they can move away and be a happy family. Tom, however, chooses to live with Steph and Mandy Richardson. Niall, feeling rejected by Tom, leaves him and Craig locked up in the cottage and takes Steph away to the barn where he has been staying. At the barn he sets up a meal for them and the pair talk about Niall's behaviour and the hurt that he has caused, mentioning things like Niall running down and killing Max Cunningham, the church explosion, the death of Tina and murdering Kieron Hobbs. Niall manages to convince Steph that he's willing to change, but Steph claims she needs the toilet and Niall shows her through to another section of the barn. While in the other room Steph uses her mobile phone to call the police, but she is cut off when Niall suddenly appears behind her and crushes it. Back at the cottage, Pete arrives back to check on things and discovers Craig tied up. He frees him and then they go and check on Tom. Craig then asks Tom where Niall took him the previous day, believing Niall will have taken Steph to the same place, but Tom is not sure.

In the barn Niall ties up Steph and tells her that he feels betrayed by her, but she knocks him out and manages to escape into the fields. Niall then gives chase and screams after Steph; Craig, who has been looking for her, hears Niall shouting and follows them. Niall traps Steph on a cliff edge and she warns him not to come any closer. He then tries to take their lives by throwing himself and Steph over the edge off the cliff. Craig then appears and tells Niall that Steph does not love him and to let her go. Niall then beats Craig in a bloody mess while Steph watches helpless. Craig then tells Niall to look at Steph who is scared by him and his behaviour. Niall then asks Steph if this is true and she confirms it. Angry and alone, Niall throws Craig into Steph's arms, kisses her briefly and then rips off the necklace he got her and walks to the edge of the cliff. Steph helps Craig up and then hears Niall say "Goodbye, Steph" just before he steps backward over the edge, jumping off the cliff, falling onto a pile of rocks below, ultimately leading to his death. Steph watches helplessly as Niall lies motionless below; Craig holds her pulling her away from the edge and Niall's body.

On 28 November, the day after Niall dies, Craig returns to Hollyoaks with Steph and Tom. Steph is worried about what people will say regarding Niall and that she might be blamed by the McQueens for his death. Craig offers Steph the chance to go with him back to Dublin, bringing Tom along. Steph declines the offer and Craig leaves Hollyoaks to return to Dublin with John Paul.

=== Off-screen ===
In 2010, Steph dies tragically in a fire. Craig did not attend the funeral, along with his siblings and his father. In 2012, John Paul is seen at a bus station in Dublin chasing a bus which Craig is on. It is later explained that they have split up and Craig has left. Craig and John Paul had been having problems and they decided to have a child through a surrogate to fix them. However, Craig left before the child was born and John Paul is left to bring up their son (John Paul's biological son), Matthew. Matthew's surrogate mother, Chloe, informs John Paul that Craig is seeing someone else- a woman.

In 2017, Craig rings John Paul who is on a plane to Singapore. Following Frankie's death from a stroke, it is mentioned Craig cannot attend her funeral, because he is in Singapore, meaning he and John Paul have gotten back together.

John Paul returns to the village in 2019, and reveals that he and Craig have split up again, and that Craig has moved on with a new boyfriend called Hans.

== Reception ==
Craig Dean is considered one of Hollyoaks' most iconic characters. In response to the fan mail the character receives, Burnet stated, "I've had a lot of fan mail and I haven't replied to all of them and I'm really sorry. But I promise I really will reply to everyone." He further revealed, "There was a point where I was completely focused on the storyline and I didn't go and collect the mail for a period of time. I managed to send off about 200 or so letters. But everyone who did send me letters, I've read them all and I really appreciate all the words. In time, I will write back to everyone. More than anything, they are the most important thing to me. Fan appreciation is great – I even appreciate if they don't like Craig, hate him even." Burnet added that he was "genuinely overwhelmed" by all of the attention. "I'm not from an acting background," he stated, "and for three or four years I was perhaps in the background and a lot of fans probably didn't recognise I was there. That was fine for me but I wanted to prove my worth."

Burnet's pairing with actor James Sutton, as Craig and John Paul, has also been successful, winning several LGBT awards. "The gay community likes the story in some ways and I love that," cited Burnet. "In some ways, I sympathise with a lot of people who have come out and it's been difficult for them. I hope that I've justified it not just for them but for people in different positions, people in positions of sexual confusion. It's for them that I hope they've enjoyed the story."

== See also ==
- John Paul McQueen and Craig Dean
