= List of Hollyoaks characters introduced in 2003 =

The following is a list of characters that first appeared in the British Channel 4 soap opera Hollyoaks in 2003, in order of first appearance.

== Nathan Rogers ==
Nathan Rogers
- Hollyoaks character
- Portrayed by: Jay Thomas
- First appearance: 27 January 2003
- Last appearance: 22 July 2003
- Introduced by: Jo Hallows

Nathan Rogers, played by Jay Thomas, was the boyfriend of Nick O'Connor (Darren Bransford). Nick and Nathan met whilst Nathan was working at II Gnosh and they started dating. Nick later revealed to Nathan that his parents didn't know that he was gay, so Nathan encouraged Nick to tell his parents, agreeing to go with him. However, Nick's father reacted badly to Nick's revelation and threw Nick and Nathan out. Nathan booked a holiday for himself and Nick, but Nick's mother phoned him, informing Nick that his father had suffered a heart attack. Nick's father asked him to stay and look after the farm, so Nathan asked Nick to choose between him and his parents. Nick chose to help his father with the farm so Nathan dumped Nick and left.

== Dale Jackson ==
Dale Jackson
- Hollyoaks character
- Portrayed by: Laila Rouass
- Duration: 2003
- First appearance: 3 February 2003
- Last appearance: 2003
- Introduced by: Jo Hallows
In-universe information
- Occupation: Police officer

Dale Jackson is a fictional character from the British Channel 4 soap opera Hollyoaks, played by Laila Rouass. She appeared throughout 2003. Upon Rouass's casting the Liverpool Echo said "if tv bosses are looking for a replacement for Cilla - Hollyoaks newest recruit may be the answer" and described her as a "new soap siren". She was also described as "feisty" and her entrances was said to "ruffle a few feathers". Dale has also been described as having a "no-nonsense attitude".

Rouass commented on the casting saying "Dale is a real go-getter, very independent and career-minded she doesn't take any nonsense. I've really settled into the `family' now. It's certainly been a change from my past experience, but Dale is a really strong character and the role has certainly given me something to get my teeth into". Rouass started filming in December 2002. The character has also been described as "mysterious". Rouass beat seventy other auditionees for the part which she said "was unbelievable" and added that she didn't "know how I got it". Rouass also added that she was "loving every minute of it".

Dale Jackson arrives in Hollyoaks village to investigate series of murders. Colleague Will Davies allows Dale to move in with him and his son, Ben and daughter Abby. Abby begins to see Dale as a mother figure but Ben is dubious about him living together. She sleeps with Ben and is caught by Will. Ben tries to apologise; however, Will insists that it really never bothered him and makes it clear to Ben that he is free to do anything he wanted. Dale tells Will she has feelings for him and the pair begin to date, despite Ben's warnings. Ben was furious at his father's actions and accuses Dale of using him, leading Will to throw Ben out of his own house. Eventually, Will and Ben make up, but Dale leaves after being sacked by the commissioner.

The Daily Mirror commented positively on Rouass's performance saying it was "sizzling" and had "set the screen alight". The Liverpool Echo commented positively on her "will they, won't they" storyline with Will labelling it a "far more pressing puzzle to be solved" than the serial killer storyline.

== Roxy Maguire ==
Roxy Maguire
- Hollyoaks character
- Portrayed by: Harriet Green
- First appearance: 17 February 2003
- Last appearance: 23 April 2003
- Introduced by: Jo Hallows

Roxanne "Roxy" Maguire, played by Harriet Green, appeared in 2003. She started dating O.B. (Darren Jeffries) in February 2003, after they met online. After sleeping with Dan Hunter (Andy McNair), Roxy went to the River Dee where she was beaten to death with a spanner by Dan's friend Toby Mills (Henry Luxemburg). Dan was accused of Roxy's murder as they had slept together a few hours earlier, but a guilty Toby provided Dan with a solicitor who pointed out there was not enough evidence to charge Dan with Roxy's murder and he was subsequently released. Toby was never caught, but was revealed to be Roxy's murderer shortly before his death in November 2003.

== Linda Mills ==
Linda Mills
- Hollyoaks character
- Portrayed by: Wendy Roe
- First appearance: 31 March 2003
- Last appearance: 10 June 2003
- Introduced by: Jo Hallows
In-universe information
- Sons: Toby Mills

Linda Mills, played by Wendy Roe, is the mother of Toby Mills (Henry Luxemburg). Linda arrived in Hollyoaks and interfered in Toby's relationship with Ellie Hunter (Sarah Baxendale) by attempting to split them up. Toby ended up choosing Ellie over her. She returned later after watching The Fish Tank, and tried to convince Toby to leave Ellie as she was cheating on him. She witnessed Toby beat Steph Dean (Carley Stenson) unconscious with a spanner and followed him home to confront him. Toby shoved her, inadvertently causing her to fall down the stairs. Ellie arrived home to find Linda lying at the bottom of the stairs, called an ambulance and helped with the cover-up. However, Linda died not long after arriving at the hospital. A year later in June 2004, Ellie's brother Lee Hunter (Alex Carter) discovered the body of another one of Toby's victims inside Linda's garage.

== Emma Chambers ==
Emma Chambers
- Hollyoaks character
- Portrayed by: Georgina Redhead
- Duration: 2003–2004
- First appearance: 29 August 2003
- Last appearance: 7 October 2004
- Introduced by: Jo Hallows
In-universe information
- Occupation: Detective
- Sons: Arthur Davies

Emma Chambers, played by Georgina Redhead, appeared between 2003 and 2004. Emma arrived in Hollyoaks as a replacement to Dale Jackson and to help Will Davies with the serial killings in Hollyoaks.

Emma is seduced by fireman Ben Davies (Will's son) when the pair meet at The Loft. Her one-night stand with Ben is to prove costly as she discovers that she is pregnant and confronts Ben with the truth. However, Ben is engaged to Izzy Cornwell and refuses to stand by Emma’s unborn child. Emma manages to keep the identity of her child's father a secret until a blast from Emma’s past returns; Will’s ex-wife and Ben’s mother, Alison Davies, who reveals the truth between Emma and the Davies.

It is revealed that long before her arrival, Emma had an affair with Will, which is the reason Will’s marriage to Alison broke down. Soon, Ben discovers the truth about Emma’s past and the link with his father. Ben’s fiancée Izzy also discovers on her wedding day that Ben is the father of Emma’s unborn child. Emma wants to have a future with Ben, but he marries Izzy anyway. Shortly after, Emma gives birth to a son, who she calls Arthur Stanley Davies. Ben then changes his mind and decides that he does want to be part of his son’s life. However, this change of heart does not last long, as at Arthur's christening, Alison tries to obliterate Emma from Arthur's baptism pictures by requesting Emma to take all of the pictures so that Emma herself will not be featured in any of them; each time Emma takes a picture, Alison taunts her by continually proclaiming "let's have another picture of baby and father". When Will asks Alison if Emma will be featured in any of the pictures, Alison arrogantly replies: "as long as I have any say in the matter, no!". Alison continues with this, ignoring Will's warning that her behaviour makes her no better than Emma and that she risks Arthur resenting her in the future. Unbeknown to Alison, however, Emma was moving the camera towards the floor each time she took the pictures, so that none of the Davies family or Arthur himself were featured either; this incident brings Emma's feud with Alison to a head, as at the party after the baptism service when Emma admits to Alison that she had sabotaged the photographs, the two get into a vicious brawl, and have to be separated by Johnno Dean and Les Hunter.

Eventually, Ben’s marriage to Izzy breaks down as Izzy cannot cope with Ben having so much to do with Arthur, and this subsequently results in Ben wanting nothing to do with Arthur, as he blames Arthur for causing his marriage to Izzy to collapse. Emma then decides it is best to move away and start over. In October 2004, Emma leaves Ben and Hollyoaks behind her, taking Arthur with her. They briefly returned six months later in the late night special Hollyoaks: Let Loose when Ben decides to file for full custody of Arthur after a chance meeting leads to Ben spending time with Arthur, and he decides the time had come to heal the rift with his son. However, Ben's then-girlfriend Lisa Hunter does not want to be a mother figure to Arthur and pressures Ben into sending Emma and Arthur away again; Ben decides that after losing Izzy he cannot risk losing Lisa as well because of Arthur, and he asks Emma and Arthur to leave, although he agreed to stay in touch with Arthur this time.

== Joe Spencer ==
Joe Spencer
- Hollyoaks character
- Portrayed by: Matt Milburn
- Duration: 2003–2006
- First appearance: 23 September 2003
- Last appearance: 8 September 2006
- Introduced by: Jo Hallows

Joe Spencer, played by Matt Milburn, debuted on-screen during episodes airing on 23 September 2003 as a new student. He left on 8 September 2006 after his character was axed by Bryan Kirkwood. For her portrayal of Joe, Milburn was nominated for "Best Newcomer" at the 2004 Inside Soap Awards.

Joe arrives as a young fresher in Hollyoaks studying fashion and got himself in a bit of a bother with roommate Robbie Flynn (Andy Newton-Lee), after the pair had a falling out over room sharing. Joe certainly had his share of attention and was fleetingly labelled as gay. This brought a few admirers like Nick O'Connor (Darren Bransford), after he too thought Joe was gay. But to prove he was not gay, Joe began dating Jodie Nash (Kate McEnery) after the pair met on a dating spree contest. However it wasn't too last for too long as Joe moved on to his next relationship, this time with Sophie Burton (Connie Powney). The pair seemed like love's young dream couple, but Joe felt the strain after he thought Sophie became too pushy in the relationship after introducing Joe to her mother Liz Burton (Andrée Bernard). Soon after, Sophie ended the relationship with Joe after learning that he was going to dump her. Joe soon built up a good friendship relations with Dannii Carbone (Christina Baily), Russ Owen (Stuart Manning) and Jeremy Peterson (Simon Cole). He also revealed that he had a rocky relationship with his alcoholic father, a police officer, who was abusive towards Joe's mother. He was also smitten with ice-queen Louise Summers (Roxanne McKee), despite the fact she has shown no interest in him.

Despite being a cheeky chap, Joe's confidence was to take a huge blow after he was beaten up by a bunch of teenage school girls. With the support of Russ and Danni, Joe was able to recover from his trauma. Joe began to concentrate on his fashion degree, however things got from bad to worse for Joe. He managed to run up in massive debts after his dealing for supplying jackets collapsed. Joe became desperate and took out a credit card in best mate Jeremy's name. Jez was oblivious to this and also bought him a laptop after Joe claimed his was stolen. Although he and Dannii were forced to leave the student flat they shared with Zara Morgan (Kelly Greenwood) and Jez to make room for Jessica Harris (Jennifer Biddall) and Olivia Johnson (Rochelle Gadd), it appeared that he moved back into the flat after Zara Mark Jury (Ash Newman) moved out.

Meanwhile, Joe's debt deepened and soon it resulted in loan sharks chasing Joe, which led to Joe faking his own death in order to get he's loan sharks off his back. The whole debt saga cost Joe dearly as he was unable to take his exams as the college records had him down as "deceased" and had to resit his final year. Before college restarted in September 2006 he found out he, Olivia, and Jessica had to move out to make room for new students. Joe recognised the name of one of the students as Zoe Carpenter (Zoe Lister), a girl he used to date in high school, but he dumped her because she was fat but realised that it was his big mistake and tried to convince her to take him back.

Joe tried to stay in the flat with Jessica and Olivia by telling the new students that they were their live-in student mentors, but the students saw through their plans. Joe tried to bribe the students with drinks but with no success. Joe made it up to Zoe by telling her he regretted dumping her in high school and then they went to The Dog in The Pond together with Kris Fisher (Gerard McCarthy), Jessica, and Olivia. That night escaped rapist Sam Owen (Louis Tamone) burst into the pub and set it on fire. Joe had theorised that the only safe way out would be through the basement. After successfully getting Kris and Zoe out, he went back for Olivia, who had been pinned under a beam just behind the bar. Before Joe left he told Zoe that he already lost her once, and he wasn't going to again. Upon finding Olivia, Joe freed her, but the bottles of alcohol behind the bar exploded, killing both of them. Zoe tried to ring Joe's phone and heard his ring tone; she and Kris followed it, with Kris remarking that "People like Joe are born lucky". Seconds later, they found it coming from a group of body bags. Joe died a hero, trying to save Olivia.

When Gordon Cunningham (Bernard Latham) and Helen Cunningham (Kathryn George) were killed off in a car crash storyline, Lucy Lather from Inside Soap stated that "while they were at it" producers should have also killed off "vain Joe".

== Robbie Flynn ==
Robert Flynn
- Hollyoaks character
- Portrayed by: Andy Newton-Lee
- Duration: 2003–2004
- First appearance: 23 September 2003
- Last appearance: 1 October 2004
- Introduced by: Jo Hallows
In-universe information
- Occupation: Holiday rep

Robert "Robbie" Flynn, played by Andy Newton-Lee, made his first appearance on 23 September 2003. He was a cheeky student who was also stubborn, hot-headed and set in his ways. Robbie preferred to have his own space and found the prospect of sharing a room in his halls of residence distinctly unappetising after a mistake by the admin, had him sharing a room with Joe Spencer. The two battled with each other hoping to get the other one to move out, this lasted a while as the two kept on winding each other up and getting back at one another, but they eventually decided to give up the war and become friends. Robbie found some love interest after he managed to sleep with Student President Chloe Bruce. According to Joe, Robbie moved to Ibiza to become a Holiday rep.

== Liz Burton ==
Liz Burton
- Hollyoaks character
- Portrayed by: Andrée Bernard
- Duration: 2003–2006
- First appearance: 10 October 2003
- Last appearance: 21 June 2006
- Introduced by: Jo Hallows
In-universe information
- Husband: Michael Burton (backstory); Richard Taylor (2004–2005)
- Sons: Justin Burton
- Daughters: Mel Burton; Sophie Burton
- Grandsons: Charlie Dean

Elizabeth Burton (also Taylor) is played by Andrée Bernard and first appeared on 10 October 2003. She single mother of three teenagers Mel, Sophie, and Justin, Liz spent most of her life trying to maintain the peace between her offspring, after their father committed suicide. She had a difficult relationship with her stepdaughter Darlene, made worse when Darlene found out that her brother Ali had (accidentally) stabbed school bully Stephen "Macki" Mackintosh to death, but told the police that she suspected Liz's son Justin of being the killer. Darlene changed her testimony in court, which contributed towards Justin being acquitted of killing Macki and Liz was grateful to Darlene for this. After Justin returned home, Liz chucked Richard out for having an affair with a colleague but said Darlene could stay with them. Liz had decided that her family should move away from Hollyoaks to Colchester, to start afresh. However, all of her children were unwilling to move with her and she left Hollyoaks without Mel, Sophie and Justin.

== Sophie Burton ==
Sophie Burton
- Hollyoaks character
- Portrayed by: Connie Powney
- Duration: 2003–2006
- First appearance: 3 November 2003
- Last appearance: 8 September 2006
- Introduced by: Jo Hallows
In-universe information
- Occupation: Beautician
- Father: Michael Burton
- Mother: Liz Burton
- Brothers: Justin Burton
- Sisters: Mel Burton

Sophie Burton, played by Connie Powney, first appeared in 2003 with on-screen family, the Burtons, including twin sister Mel Burton, who was played by Powney's real life twin Cassie Powney. Sophie arrived in Hollyoaks as the twin sister of Mel, along with their mother Liz and brother Justin. Sophie was the more outgoing twin (although she was sensible with it) and Mel often felt inferior to her. On her arrival, Sophie took on a beauty course at Hollyoaks Community College where her sister Mel already attended. Mel was unhappy as she felt Sophie would get more attention than her and always felt like the shadow of Sophie. Despite Sophie always trying to make her relationship better with her twin sister, Mel often made it hard. Most of the time, Sophie would be in-between her mother and Mel's arguments as Sophie would be the peacemaker. Frequently, Sophie supported and helped her siblings through their troubles, as Sophie herself never was involved in any nuisance. She was also supportive of her mother Liz's new partner Richard Taylor, despite Justin and Mel feeling uneasy at his arrival, Mel Burton fell in love with Michael Lane but he sadly left the village. Sophie began dating student Joe Spencer, but it didn't last for too long as she discovered that Joe was going to dump her and dumped him instead. Sophie also briefly dated Max Cunningham after initially going on a date with his friend O.B. who became Mel's boyfriend.

Sophie became friends with Sam Owen who started to fancy Sophie, but unbeknown to her Sam had recently started date raping girls after prompting from his friend Andy Holt. During Christmas 2005, Andy targeted the Burton sisters as his next date rape victims. After getting himself an invite to the Burton house and spiking both girls' drinks with GHB, Andy offered an unconscious Sophie as a present to Sam. Although Sam was tempted due to his strong feelings he had for Sophie, he found himself unable to go through with the rape because he didn't want to hurt the girl he loved. Although Sophie escaped a sexual attack that night, Mel was raped by Andy. The next morning, when Sam and Andy had long since fled, Sophie and Mel recovered from the drowsiness of being drugged and pieced together what had happened to them. They both went to the police claiming to have been raped by Andy, although tests proved that Sophie had not undergone any sort of sexual abuse. The fact that Mel was raped when Sophie wasn't caused some friction between the sisters. Sophie turned to Sam for support and soon started falling for him. She began a relationship with Sam, unaware of his part of the rapes. After Andy's death, Sam had little choice but to confess his crime to Sophie because he loved her and wanted to run away with her. Sophie tricked Sam into turning himself in by saying she would stand by him until his release. As soon as Sam had come clean to the police, Sophie had her own confession for Sam when she told him she could never forgive him for letting Andy rape her sister Mel.

Gradually Sophie managed to put Sam behind her and began to work at the newly opened salon Evissa as she was hired as an assistant for Sean Kennedy. She also found an unlikely friend in Russ Owen, Sam's brother, as the pair both had something in common, being betrayed by Sam. Things didn't get any better for Sophie as she was briefly sacked after false allegations made by Mercedes McQueen that Sophie had injured her during a treatment, but was later reinstated after Russ got photographic proof that she was faking it. From the moment Mercedes arrived in Hollyoaks she and Sophie were immediately enemies. Also Sophie, along with Mel, moved in with her friend Louise Summers after a brief spell of being homeless when Liz left Hollyoaks and sold the Burton house. Meanwhile, Sophie's feelings grew stronger for Russ and she eventually told him how she felt, but was left devastated when he told her that he was dating Mercedes. Things went from bad to worse as Sam escaped from prison, which again brought Russ and Sophie closer together. This time the pair ended up sleeping with one another and began to date, but Russ was secretly still seeing Mercedes. Sam had returned to the village and was told by his sister Nicole that his brother was dating Sophie. Sam then forced Nicole to tell him where Russ and Sophie were. She told him that they were at the local pub The Dog in The Pond - in fact only Sophie was there (with Mel and OB) as Russ was having sex with Mercedes. Sam headed to The Dog in The Pond and dramatically set fire to the pub. Sophie tried to escape but Sam tried to strangle her. Mel then jumped on Sam in an attempt to pull him off her. Russ arrived and pulled Sophie out of the burning pub. In her final moments Sophie was concerned about Mel as she couldn't find her. Sophie then died in Russ' arms after suffering from smoke inhalation.

Sophie was unpopular with Lucy Lather from Inside Soap. When Gordon Cunningham (Bernard Latham) and Helen Cunningham (Kathryn George) were killed off in a car crash plot, Lather wished that the show's producers had also killed off both Sophie and Mel "while they were at it".

== Richard Taylor ==
Richard Taylor
- Hollyoaks character
- Portrayed by: Richard Calkin
- Duration: 2003–2005
- First appearance: 4 November 2003
- Last appearance: 21 November 2005
- Introduced by: Jo Hallows
In-universe information
- Wife: Karen Taylor; Liz Burton (2004–2005)
- Sons: Ali Taylor; Ethan Taylor
- Daughters: Darlene Taylor; Georgina Taylor
- Stepsons: Justin Burton (2004–2005)
- Stepdaughters: Mel Burton (2004–2005); Sophie Burton (2004–2005)

Richard Taylor, played by Richard Calkin, appeared on the soap between 2003 and 2005. Richard arrives in Hollyoaks with two of his four children Darlene Taylor and Ali Taylor, to set up home with Liz Burton and three of her children Justin Burton, Sophie Burton and Mel Burton and to run the local Gym "Bodyboost". Liz and Richard's attempts to fuse the two families together was the focus of many Hollyoaks story arcs. Eventually he and Liz married, and some time later the two families combined, just in time for them to be ripped apart again, when Ali was killed in a traffic accident and Justin was arrested for murder (a crime Ali committed and ran away from before his accident). Richard eventually cheated on Liz in a similar fashion to how he had cheated on his former wife with Liz. After Justin's trial, in which he was found not guilty, Liz throws Richard out, and he leaves the village.

== Ali Taylor ==
Ali Taylor
- Hollyoaks character
- Portrayed by: Luti Fagbenle
- Duration: 2003–2005
- First appearance: 4 November 2003
- Last appearance: 19 August 2005
- Introduced by: Jo Hallows
In-universe information
- Occupation: Student
- Father: Richard Taylor
- Mother: Karen Taylor
- Brothers: Ethan Taylor
- Sisters: Darlene Taylor<brGeorgina Taylor

Ali Taylor, played by Luti Fagbenle, appeared between 2003 and 2005. Immediately, Ali has a clash of personalities with Liz Burton's son Justin as the pair did not get on. Things got worse for Ali as Justin spiraled towards drug addiction, smoking marijuana, since the pair shared a bedroom. At school, Justin started hanging out with a boy called Steven Mackintosh who sold him the marijuana. Ali was bullied by both Justin and Macki, but as an intelligent and sensitive child, Ali's natural response to this was to ignore the bullying. Ali then made friends with new girl Nicole Owen. Back at home Ali tried to tell both Liz and Richard how he couldn't live with Justin. Little action was taken and it got out of control when Justin pushed Ali's sister, Darlene, through a window. This led to Darlene having a scar and Justin being sent to a boot camp. When Justin returned, Ali could not forgive him, despite Justin trying to tell Ali that he had changed for the better. Eventually, Ali began to believe Justin as the pair began to get along better. Ali started to develop feelings for Nicole, but he never managed to tell how he felt about her as she had fallen for Justin. Despite Nicole fancying his step brother Ali's relationship with Justin became stronger.

Ali and Justin's friendship had not gone unnoticed by Macki, who had become angry that Justin didn't want to hang out with him and his gang or buy drugs off him anymore. Macki started to bully Justin and Ali. Ali suffered racial abuse and was called names like "Monkey boy". Despite confiding with his sister Darlene, the pair still could not shake off Macki's bullying as it got from bad to worse. In the end it got so bad that both Ali and Justin would not even step outside their house and Justin bought a hunting knife for protection. The knife was found by Ali's dad, Richard who put it in a safe place. Ali then reached breaking point as could not confide in his parents or teachers and decided to take matters in his own hands and it was Ali's unrequited crush on Nicole that eventually proved his undoing. After Nicole rebuked him for being a coward, Ali took the knife, that Richard had confiscated from Justin, from its hiding place and sought out Macki alone. Ali went looking for Macki and challenged him to a fight, Macki led Ali to a deserted area and whilst Ali's back was turned and picked up a brick.

Meanwhile, Justin and Darlene found the knife had gone missing and went looking for Ali. The two split up and Justin saw Ali, just as Macki was about to swing the brick. Justin quickly yelled at Ali to watch out and as Macki was about to hit him with a brick, Ali managed to turn around just in time and as an act of self-defence Ali stabbed and killed Macki. Justin then ran up to Ali and told him to give him the knife and run home whilst he would deal with the knife. Scared by his actions, Ali ran in fear as he ran straight out into the street and was hit by a car. Darlene reached Ali just in time to see the accident happen and rode with him in the ambulance. Later in hospital both Ali and Macki died, and Justin hid the knife in the hospital toilets. Days later, Justin was arrested for Macki's murder. However, he was found not guilty.

== Alison Davies ==
Alison Davies
- Hollyoaks character
- Portrayed by: Natalie Forbes
- Duration: 2003–2004
- First appearance: 15 December 2003
- Last appearance: 22 September 2004
- Introduced by: Jo Hallows
In-universe information
- Husband: Will Davies
- Sons: Ben Davies
- Daughters: Abby Davies
- Grandsons: Arthur Davies

Alison Davies, played by Natalie Forbes, appeared between 2003 and 2004. Alison is the ex-wife of Will Davies (Barny Clevely) and the mother of Ben (Marcus Patric) and Abby Davies (Helen Noble).

Alison arrived in Hollyoaks in December 2003 after discovering that Emma Chambers (Georgina Redhead) was in the village, and revealed to her children that Will and Emma had an affair, which caused Alison and Will's marriage to end. Alison attended the christening of Emma and Ben's son, Arthur. She tried to make sure Emma wouldn't appear in any of the photos by continuously wanting more photos of Ben and Arthur, and the Davies family without Emma. She told Will that she refused to allow Emma to be in any of the photos, and was furious when she discovered that Emma had purposely taken photos in which neither the Davies family nor baby Arthur were featured in. Alison attacked her but they were separated by Johnno Dean (Colin Wells) and Les Hunter ( John Graham Davies). After the christening, Alison left the village and didn't return.
