= Andy Newton-Lee =

British actor

Andrew Newton-Lee or Andy Newton-Lee (born 1981) is a British actor who played the role of Robbie Flynn in Channel 4's soap opera Hollyoaks.

== Early life ==
Newton-Lee attended Malet Lambert Secondary School in Hull, Yorkshire, England, where he grew up.

== Career ==
Newton-Lee joined the cast of Hollyoaks with the characters Mel Burton and Joe Spencer. His other roles included parts in Coronation Street, Casualty, Doctors and Where the Heart Is (where he first appeared).

He featured on ITV's The Mint game show in December 2006 to promote his Christmas pantomime playing Dick Whittington in Blackpool.

He first appeared on Casualty on 22 March 2009. He was interviewed on ITV's Loose Women on 11 June 2009 to discuss the death of his character, Stacey, after an eight-month storyline.

== Personal life ==
In 2005, Newton-Lee was diagnosed with stage 3 melanoma in both legs, which led him to become an ambassador for Cancer Research UK, raising awareness about this type of skin cancer in men. Through this role, Newton-Lee became involved in charity runs and has completed 13 marathons and 7 half marathons around the world. He was invited to the Houses of Parliament by Sian James MP to address a panel of experts and discuss the growing rate of skin cancer in men.

Newton-Lee also founded a moving company called "Next Stop LAX", which helped people in the entertainment industry (such as Tulisa, Matt Lucas, and Ruby Rose) move to the United States. The business collapsed at the start of the COVID-19 pandemic in 2020.

In April 2016, Newton-Lee dated Sam Smith after the two met at the Coachella festival.

In 2017, he was honoured during the Hull City of Culture 2017 Light Show as an iconic face of Hull.

In 2018, he took part in the Hull Marathon but was disqualified for wearing headphones during the race, contrary to the race rules. He was one of two runners disqualified for this reason.

In May 2019, Newton-Lee was placed in a coma for a week after being found collapsed in his car in Los Angeles. (His collapse may have been due to an overdose of Adderall, which is illegal in the UK.) Soon after his coma, he flew back to the UK.

In April 2020, Newton-Lee announced a new initiative to encourage people in Hull to become physically active during the COVID-19 lockdowns.
