= Darlene Taylor =

Darlene Taylor may refer to:

- Darlene Taylor (Hollyoaks), a character from soap opera Hollyoaks
- Darlene Taylor (politician) (born 1950), member of the Georgia House of Representatives
