= Portobello Post =

Video & Film Post-Production House in London

Portobello Post is a video & film post-production house on Portobello Road in London. The post house specialises in all areas of post production including grading, offline and online editing.

In 2008 Portobello post teamed up with Talent Circle the creators of Super Shorts Film Festival to become main sponsors and organisers of the festival in 2008. The 'Portobello Post Super Shorts International Film Festival' was held between 1–6 July in Central London.

Director of the company, Luti Fagbenle placed the wall of the post house up for auction on popular auction site eBay after notorious British graffiti artist Banksy stenciled artwork on it. The event generated attention from newspapers worldwide and the wall which was claimed to be worth £400,000 has reported by The Metro Newspaper to have been sold for £200,000. There is still much mystery and skepticism around the sale as the wall remains at Portobello Post.
