= Georgina Redhead =

British stage and television actress

Georgina Redhead is a British stage and television actress.

Having played supporting cast parts in Sky One's Dream Team in 1997, and ITV1's The Bill in 2002. Redhead took the role of DC Emma Chambers in Channel 4's teenage soap Hollyoaks from August 2003, where her character had a one-night stand with fireman Ben Davis, and later had his child, Arthur.

Redhead has recently appeared in the PC World advert for a Toshiba laptop, and an episode of the BBC soap opera Doctors. Redhead has also acted on the stage, including as sexy sister Laura in the British touring production of Peter Colley's Canadian-based thriller, I'll Be Back Before Midnight.

In 2015, Redhead took part in Mission: Impossible – Rogue Nation, appearing as the prime minister's wife during the auction scene.
