= What a Girl Wants (film) =

2003 American teen comedy film by Dennie Gordon

- Theatrical release poster
- Directed by: Dennie Gordon
- Written by: Jenny Bicks; Elizabeth Chandler
- Based on: The Reluctant Debutante by William Douglas-Home
- Produced by: Denise Di Novi; Bill Gerber; Hunt Lowry
- Starring: Amanda Bynes; Colin Firth; Kelly Preston; Eileen Atkins; Anna Chancellor; Jonathan Pryce
- Cinematography: Andrew Dunn
- Edited by: Charles McClelland
- Music by: Rupert Gregson-Williams
- Production companies: Gaylord Films Di Novi Pictures; Gerber Pictures
- Distributed by: Warner Bros. Pictures
- Release date: April 4, 2003
- Running time: 105 minutes
- Country: United States
- Language: English
- Budget: $25 million
- Box office: $51 million

What a Girl Wants is a 2003 American teen comedy film directed by Dennie Gordon and written by Jenny Bicks and Elizabeth Chandler. Based on the 1955 play The Reluctant Debutante by William Douglas-Home, it is the second adaptation for the screen of this work and stars Amanda Bynes, Colin Firth, Kelly Preston, Eileen Atkins, Anna Chancellor, and Jonathan Pryce. The film tells the story of a seventeen-year-old girl who goes to the United Kingdom to meet the father she never knew.

The film was released by Warner Bros. Pictures on April 4, 2003, received mixed reviews from critics and grossed $51 million worldwide against a $25 million budget.

== Plot ==
Seventeen-year-old Daphne Reynolds lives with her wedding singer mother Libby above a restaurant in Chinatown, Manhattan. Many years earlier, Libby had met Briton Henry Dashwood in Morocco, and they had gotten married in a Bedouin wedding ceremony, under uncertain legality. They then returned to his family's estate in England.

Henry's father died soon afterward, making Henry the new Lord Dashwood, Earl of Wycombe. Libby eventually leaves Henry without telling him of her pregnancy. Alistair Payne, the family's aristocratic advisor, tells Henry she had fallen in love with someone else.

Daphne runs off to London to try and meet her father, who has disclaimed his seat in the House of Lords to run for election to the House of Commons, hoping to eventually become the prime minister of the United Kingdom. With Alistair as his political advisor, he is engaged to Alistair's daughter, Glynnis, who hopes to become the new Countess of Wycombe.

At a London hostel, Daphne meets Ian Wallace, a local boy who works there to support himself so he can continue to pursue his dream of becoming a successful musician. After forming a friendship while Ian shows Daphne around London, they begin dating. When Henry catches Daphne at his estate, he is stunned to learn he has a daughter, but his mother Jocelyne, the current Countess of Wycombe, immediately welcomes her, giving her a room at the estate.

Daphne tries to win the acceptance of her father's social circle, but is repeatedly thwarted by Glynnis and her daughter Clarissa, who feel threatened by her arrival. In addition, Daphne has to ward off the advances of Armistead Stewart whom Clarissa fancies and with whom Ian has a long-standing rivalry. After he attempts to hit on her, Daphne pushes Armistead into the River Thames.

Daphne inadvertently wins over the British aristocracy, including the elderly royal Princess Charlotte. However, Henry's political campaign suffers due to Daphne's flamboyant behavior and his subsequent misbehavior with her. He convinces Daphne to assume the more dignified manner of the Dashwood lineage, after which Henry's polling numbers quickly improve. However, Ian is hurt by Daphne's new behavior and eventually breaks up with her.

During her Debutante party hosted by her father, Jocelyne invites Libby to attend, while Daphne overhears Alistair telling Glynnis how he "got rid" of her mother. When Daphne confronts him, Glynnis locks her in another room. Then she asks Ian, the band's lead singer, to announce the father–daughter dance. Libby frees Daphne, but when they see Henry dancing with Clarissa, Daphne tells Henry she is returning to the United States.

Sometime later, Henry announces that he is withdrawing from the election. As he leaves the press conference, he discovers that Alistair knew about Libby's pregnancy and manipulated their separation. He punches him in the face for this deceit, then breaks off his engagement to Glynnis.

Henry reunites with Daphne and Libby at a wedding ceremony, telling Daphne that he loves her for who she is. They reconcile and engage in a father–daughter dance. Ian reunites with Daphne and Henry apologizes to Libby.

Later, Glynnis marries a compulsively talkative wealthy nobleman. Clarissa marries Armistead. Alistair works on a London tour bus. Henry and Libby legally marry in another Bedouin ceremony. Daphne is accepted into the University of Oxford, now in a relationship with Ian.

== Cast ==
- Amanda Bynes as Daphne Reynolds, the protagonist. A seventeen-year-old American girl living in New York with her single mom, Libby. Daphne has desired to meet her father she never met, Lord Henry Dashwood, for most of her life. Care-free and eccentric, but loyal and kind-hearted, Daphne tries her best to fit in with her father's world, but ultimately finds out that she is happy for who she truly is. Daphne also serves as the narrator of the film.
- Colin Firth as Henry Dashwood, the Earl of Wycombe who is Daphne's biological father and Libby's former lover. First appearing as stuffy, Henry is a kind man who buries his own eccentric, carefree life style in the favor of keeping up appearances. Although he previously thinks that Libby had left him for someone else, he is still in love with her. At first shocked that he had a daughter, Henry warms up to Daphne and ultimately realizes that he needs her and Libby in his life.
- Kelly Preston as Libby Reynolds, Daphne's compassionate and supportive mother and the love of Henry's life, who works as a wedding singer.
- Eileen Atkins as Jocelyne Dashwood, the Dowager Countess of Wycombe, Henry's widowed mother, and Daphne's paternal grandmother. Level-headed and having a dry wit, Jocelyne openly welcomes Daphne into the Dashwoods' lives. She despises Alistair, Glynnis, and Clarissa for their snobbiness and over-emphasis on social standing, preferring the more authentic and humble Daphne.
- Anna Chancellor as Glynnis Payne, Henry's fiancée, Alistair Payne's daughter, and Clarissa's mother. A snobby and materialistic social climber, intent on marrying Henry to become the new Countess of Wycombe, Glynnis is over concerned with appearances. She and her daughter feel threatened by Daphne's arrival.
- Jonathan Pryce as Alistair Payne, Henry's pompous and manipulative advisor and campaign manager. He was the advisor of Henry's late father. Alistair orchestrated Henry and Libby's separation, because he viewed Libby as unsuitable to be a lady.
- Oliver James as Ian Wallace, a young, aspiring British musician and Daphne's love interest. He loves Daphne for her go-getting, lively personality, though he tries to be supportive of her trying to fit in, even though she was really "born to stand out".
- Christina Cole as Clarissa Payne, Glynnis's equally snobby, bratty and gossipy daughter and Alistair's granddaughter. As the stereotypical evil stepsister, Clarissa is not as intelligent as her mother, but is cruel to Daphne and everyone she views as of lower standing.
- Sylvia Syms as Princess Charlotte, a royal whom Daphne befriends.
- Tara Summers as Noelle
- Ben Scholfield as Armistead Stuart, Baron-Smthye, the son of the Earl of Doughton, he is an arrogant and womanizing upper-class boy whom Clarissa fancies. He lusts for Daphne, who wants absolutely nothing to do with him.
- James Greene as Percy, the elderly butler of Henry and Jocelyne who Glynnis called senile at one point.
- Roger Ashton-Griffiths as Lord Orwood, a lord who hosts a party that Daphne attends.
- Cassie Powney and Connie Powney as Peach and Pear Orwood, the twin daughters of Lord Orwood that Daphne befriends whose mother named them Peach and Pear due to her obsession with fruits. They also mentioned to that they have a sister named Parsnip who doesn't get out much.
- Elizabeth Richard as Queen Elizabeth II
- Chris Castle as Prince Harry
- Peter Hugo as Prince Charles
- Matthew Turpin as Prince William

== Release ==
=== Critical response ===
On Rotten Tomatoes, the film holds an approval rating of 35% based on 110 reviews, with an average rating of 4.80/10. The website's critical consensus reads, "Little girls will definitely enjoy it, but it's too syrupy and predictable for adults." On Metacritic, the film has a weighted average score of 41 out of 100, based on 27 critics, indicating "mixed or average reviews". Audiences surveyed by CinemaScore gave the film a grade "A" on scale of A to F.

The film is available on various streaming services.

Edward Guthmann of The San Francisco Chronicle called it a "dreadful teen comedy." Anya Kamenetz of The Village Voice described the film as "a sanitized adventure for the Mary Kate-and-Ashley set."

=== Box office ===
In its opening weekend, the film grossed $11.4 million in 2,964 theaters in the United States and Canada, ranking #2 at the box office behind fellow newcomer Phone Booth ($15 million). By the end of its run, the film had grossed $36.1 million domestically and $14.6 million internationally, totaling $51 million worldwide.

=== Promotion ===
Before the U.S. release of the film, print advertisements were altered to remove the peace sign that Bynes was giving in the poster as the 2003 invasion of Iraq by the United States, the United Kingdom, and their allied forces had begun. A rep for Warner Bros. explained: "'In a time of war, we made a slight alteration so that we could avoid any potential political statement in a completely nonpolitical film."

== Accolades ==
The film won and was nominated for a number of awards throughout 2004.

Year	Ceremony	Category	Recipients	Result
2004	Kids' Choice Awards	Favorite Movie Actress	Amanda Bynes	Won
