= Justin Burton =

UK soap opera character (created 2003)

- Hollyoaks character
- Portrayed by: Chris Fountain
- Duration: 2003–2009
- First appearance: 3 November 2003
- Last appearance: 3 June 2009
- Introduced by: Jo Hallows
- Book appearances: Hollyoaks: Playing with Fire
In-universe information
- Father: Michael Burton
- Mother: Liz Burton
- Sisters: Sophie Burton; Mel Burton
- Sons: Charlie Dean

Justin Burton is a fictional character from the British Channel 4 soap opera Hollyoaks, played by Chris Fountain. Justin arrived in 2003 and departed on 3 June 2009. Justin arrived in a family of six, however by September 2006, the Burton family had left the show. It was announced in March 2009 that Fountain had decided to leave the show and would depart in a 'major storyline which echoes the fire which killed his sisters'. Fountain was credited in a flashback episode broadcast on 1 December 2010. On 12 April 2023, it was revealed that Justin had been killed off-screen on 5 October 2022, nearly 14 years after his last appearance on screen.

== Storylines ==
Justin arrives with his mother Liz, identical twin sisters Mel and Sophie, Liz's partner Richard Taylor and his children Darlene and Ali. Justin often rivals with the pair and always finds it hard to accept the Taylor clan as part of his family. Justin's world is torn apart after he discovers that his father had committed suicide, as Justin thought he died of a heart attack. Feeling confused of why his father had done this and angry that his mother had hid the truth, Justin's behaviour goes out of control as he begins to take drugs and skips school. Justin starts stealing from his family to pay for his drug habit and his bad attitude begins to unsettle the family. Justin starts to hang around the wrong crowd, including his new best friend, Macki, who Justin buys his drugs from. Macki encourages Justin to distract the others in their class including Justin's stepbrother Ali and his friend Nicole Owen. It is not long before his actions take a serious effect. During Darlene’s 18th birthday, Justin pushes her through a window which leaves her face scarred. Liz tries to force him to apologise so Justin hits her. This leaves Liz with no choice and she forces Justin to go to a boot camp. When he arrives, Justin makes friends with a girl called Paula. The pair start to rebel against the camp counsellors. One of the counsellors reads a letter Darlene had written about Justin. He slowly learns about the mistakes he made and realises he has to do a lot of making up to his family. Justin returns home and tries to convince his family that he has changed for the better, but they need more evidence. Gradually, Justin begins to gain his family's trust. He builds a close relationship with Ali and he also contributes money towards Darlene’s plastic surgery for her scar. Justin begins developing a crush on his teacher Becca Dean when she starts helping him with his GCSEs.

Justin stays out of trouble until Macki tries to get him to hang around with him again. Justin refuses so he can hang around with Ali. Macki starts to bully Justin and Ali. He is racist towards Ali and tries to frame Justin for a fire he starts in the school. Macki takes a picture of Justin trying to stop him turning on the gas taps before the science laboratory blows up. Macki sends the pictures to Becca. Justin manages to convince her not to report him until he could clear his name and he eventually finds evidence to support his claims and manages to get Macki expelled from school. The next term, Macki returns to school and wants revenge. The bullying gets worse and Macki gets Justin beaten up by his friends. Justin and Ali decide to keep the bullying to themselves. Justin buys a knife as the bullying get out of hand. Richard finds the knife and confiscates it. Ali finally has enough of the bullying and finds the knife. He leaves in search of Macki. Ali finds him and offers a one-on-one fight. Ali leads Macki off to a quiet area. Justin discovers the knife is missing and, with the help of Darlene, they go off in search of Ali. Ali turns his back on Macki, picks up a brick. Justin arrives and shouts to Ali to watch out for Macki and the brick. Ali turns around quickly and accidentally stabs Macki. Justin urges Ali to run as he takes the knife. Ali then runs across the road without looking and gets hit by a car. Darlene turns up just at the same moment. She calls an ambulance. Justin hides the knife in the toilets at the hospital. Justin is informed that both Macki and Ali died. Justin returns to get the knife and he is arrested for Macki's murder. Justin tries to tell the police that Ali killed Macki in self-defence but they do not believe him. Darlene does not want to believe her brother is a murderer and accuses Justin of lying. Justin is remanded to a youth detention centre, where he is bullied by his cellmate. Justin is beaten up and ends up having to go to the dentist to fix his teeth. While there, he sees a chance to leave and he escapes.

He makes contact with Becca who tries to convince him to turn himself in, Justin is almost caught. Mel and Sophie give Justin some supplies and he is almost caught again. Justin approaches Nicole and asks her to get him food. Nicole assumes they are going to run off together and when she finds out Justin does not love her, she calls the police. They arrest Justin and he goes back to prison to await trial, where he is visited in secret by Becca. At the trial, Macki's friends make out that Justin bullied them and Macki, however, Justin's lawyer shows the court a video on Macki's phone showing his gang beating up Ali. The prosecution put Justin's cellmate on the stand and he tells the court that Justin confessed to Macki's murder. Nicole and Becca are put on the stand, and the prosecution insinuate that Becca is having an affair with Justin. Darlene sees the video of Macki's gang beating up Ali and realises that Ali killed Macki. Darlene then lies in court that she had seen Ali stabbing Macki. The jury find Justin not guilty and he is freed from prison.

Justin sets out to win Becca's love. Nicole tells the school she slept with Justin. Justin tells her it's in her head. Becca confronts Justin about his treatment of Nicole. Justin asks her if she is jealous and they end up sleeping together on Christmas Day 2005. Jealous over her marriage to Jake Dean, Justin begins a relationship with Becca's sister, Nancy to make Becca jealous. Justin and Becca continue their affair. Becca becomes pregnant and is unsure over the baby's paternity. Becca ends her and Justin's relationship after Grace Hutchinson dies and she decides to stay with Jake to raise the baby together rather than run away with Justin. Nicole finds out about the affair and tells Nancy, who then tells Jake. Jake attacks Justin. News of their affair spreads around the village. Justin and Becca continue their relationship and he moves in with Becca and Nancy after Liz moves to Colchester. Justin and Becca get into financial troubles when Becca is fired from her teaching job for sleeping with a student. They live off of Justin's child benefits and his income from a part-time job at Il Gnosh. Becca gets a job at a fast food restaurant.

The relationship becomes rocky when Justin befriends Sonny Valentine. Becca realises how immature Justin is and feels he is not ready to be a father to her baby. Justin's behaviour becomes worse after Mel and Sophie die in a fire caused by Sam Owen. Justin discovers that Sophie's boyfriend, Russ Owen was sleeping with Mercedes McQueen when Sophie died. Justin's behaviour spirals out of control and he vandalises a mural painted by Nancy's boyfriend, Foz for those who died in the fire. Justin waits outside the Student Ball with Sonny for Russ to show so they can beat him up, but when Kris Fisher tries to get them to leave, he takes out his frustration on him. Sonny runs off, while Justin is arrested and spends a night in the cells at the police station. Justin proposes to Becca just as she is thinking about dumping him. Feeling sorry for him after his sisters' death, she accepts.

Becca dumps Justin after he threatens Jake after seeing him and Becca discussing their divorce. Enraged at being dumped, Justin gets revenge by filing a case against Becca for having sex with a minor. Everyone turns against Justin and he is kidnapped by Jake, who does not want his child to be born in prison. Justin escapes and testifies against Becca but decides not to report Jake. Becca is found guilty and is sentenced to two years in prison where she gives birth to a boy named Charlie. During Becca's trial, Justin moves in with the Valentines and Sonny's sister Sasha falls for Justin. Justin and Sasha share a kiss, although he has no true feelings for her. Justin builds up a friendship with Sonny's father Leo and the two start drinking and gambling together. This makes Sonny's brother, Calvin angry as Justin tells him he will spend time looking for a new job and home. He goes back to smoking cannabis and when Calvin finds his stash, Sasha lies and tells him it is hers. Justin sleeps with Sasha, who is under-age. Sasha wants a relationship with Justin but he refuses telling her she is too young. Becca decides to let Charlie live with Jake. Justin grows jealous when he sees Charlie with Jake. Later, Justin sees Jake's car unlocked outside Drive N' Buy. He and Sonny take it joyriding and discover Charlie in the back. Justin holds him in his arms and realises that he is Charlie's father. Justin asks Jake for a paternity test. When the results return, Jake does not open it but tells his family that he is Charlie's father. He then gets rid of the letter.

Justin is befriended by local gangster Warren Fox, who is running The Loft with Clare Cunningham. Warren gives Justin a job. A drunken Justin confesses to Warren that he lied about Becca sleeping with him when he was 15. Warren is disgusted and forces Justin to confess to the police. They start procedures to release Becca. Becca ends up in a fight with her cellmate, who then pulls out a knife and stabs her. Becca is rushed to hospital but sadly dies. Justin, unaware of her death, asks Jake how Becca was doing, Jake turns to him and tells him she was killed. Justin tries to apologise to Nancy. Angry that he caused Becca's death, Nancy attacks Justin. At Becca's funeral, Jake bursts into the Valentine home and plans to kill Justin, but Calvin stops him in time, as Justin discover that Becca's true love was Jake, and didn't love him, and was devastated. Feeling guilty, Justin goes to Mel and Sophie's graves and tells them that he has nothing in his life now.

Justin is thrown out of the Valentine's when Louise Summers, Becca's best friend, moves in with boyfriend Calvin. She insists Justin moves out, Justin is taken in by Warren. Justin finds himself caught up in a feud between Warren and Clare. When Warren goes to Spain, Clare seduces Justin in an attempt to get him on her side and get information on Warren. She finds Sean Kennedy's wallet while snooping in Warren's flat. Clare becomes suspicious over the whereabouts of Sean. Justin lies to Warren that someone had taken the wallet. Clare gives Warren the wallet back. She becomes even more suspicious. Warren finds out about Clare and Justin sleeping together, he takes a terrified Justin out into the woods and tells him to dig. Justin believes he is digging his own grave and that Warren will kill him. Warren reveals that he is digging up Sean's body and wants Justin to dig it up for him and throw it in a river. Justin does what Warren asks because if he does not, Warren will kill him. Shaken Justin tells Warren he will not tell anyone about Sean's murder.

A new girl arrives in the village who Justin takes an instant like to. Unfortunately she turns out to be Warren's sister Katy Fox. Justin tries to avoid Katy but they end up dating secretly. Katy talks to Louise Summers about her relationship but is upset when Louise tells her about Justin's role in Becca's death. After speaking to Justin about it, Katy sees that Justin has changed and is willing to give their relationship a second chance. However, Clare finds out about the relationship and tells Warren, who beats Justin up.

Justin and Katy plan to run away together away from Warren. They arrange to meet on the same night of Mercedes McQueen's hen night. Justin returns to Warren's flat to retrieve Mel's bracelet. Justin hides behind the sofa as Warren sleeps with Mercedes. Justin slips out of the flat unnoticed. The same night, Clare is pushed from The Loft balcony in an attempt on her life. Shortly after Clare's attack, Justin is hit by a van in front of Katy near the train station. In hospital, Warren admits he was driving the van, having discovered Justin and Katy's plan to run away after finding Justin's mobile phone and reading text messages from Katy. Katy stays with Justin while he recovers in hospital. When he is released, Justin and Katy depart Hollyoaks together.

Who Pushed Clare?

Justin has to return to Hollyoaks with Katy to be told what will happen to him for lying in court about Becca. The police drop the charges. Justin and Katy go to The Loft where Nancy is with her friends. Justin tells her that he thinks about Becca every day. Nancy attempts to slap him but instead hits Katy. Justin tells Katy that no-one, not even Becca, could replace her. Justin continues to live with Louise, who moved in with them, and Katy as Warren faces trial for supposedly pushing Clare. Katy tries to convince Justin to testify on Warrens behalf. Justin comes up with an excuse for him to leave. He tells Katy his mother is ill ad leaves. On his return, he discovers that Warren was released. On Katy's birthday, Louise, Warren, Justin and Katy go for a meal at Il Gnosh. Warren announces that he and Louise plan to buy The Loft from Clare and asks Justin to work for him. Justin refuses but later they talk and decide for Katy's sake they will work together. Clare is made to sign over The Loft and prepares to leave Hollyoaks. Clare tells Justin that he is as worthless as his sisters. Justin then follows her outside and tells her that it was not fair that she survived the fall, while Sophie and Mel had died. He then reveals to Clare that he was the one who pushed her. He tells her he had returned to The Loft to steal money after leaving Warren's flat and overheard Clare's argument with OB, where she bragged that Mel would still be alive if it was not for her and claimed that Mel and Sophie's deaths were "two for the price of one."

Justin accepts the manager job at The Loft. During a party, Justin receives a text from who he thinks was Katy saying that she has bumped into an old friend and that she will be along to the club later. Justin and Warren return home and find the flat trashed but no sign of Katy. Justin, Warren and Max Cunningham search for Katy and receive a phone call from Clare. Clare tells Warren that she has Katy to punish Justin because he pushed her over the balcony. Justin sees Warren's face, realises he knows it is his fault Warren was in prison and Katy has been taken, and runs away. Warren and Max rush after him. Warren catches Justin and gets another call from Clare who tells Warren to kill Justin and she would give Katy back. Warren pretends to kill Justin. Clare wants proof so asks Warren to kick the "body". Warren kicks him but Clare asks Max to kick him. Max knows he cannot so Justin gets up and runs to save Katy. Clare drives towards him and runs him over and drives off. Warren, Max and Justin drive after her. Clare skids past bikers and plummets over a quarry into water. Warren and Justin jump in after Katy, who they rescue. Max jumps in to save Clare but watches as she vanishes beneath the water. Unbeknownst to them, Clare survives and leaves for an unknown destination.

Katy's near death experience not only destroys all her trust in Justin. Justin becomes depressed and has failed attempts to make it up to her. Katy is invited to a party in the Halls of Residence. Before, Danny Valentine does some maintenance on a gas pipe. At the party, the gas begins to leak and everyone falls unconscious. Justin decides to apologise to Katy and finds everyone unconscious. Justin pulls Katy to safety as everyone else gets out. Katy decides to give Justin another chance. She tells Warren that she still loves Justin and they ware back together. In January 2008, Charlie is revealed to have an acute form of leukaemia. Nancy and Jake plead with doctors to run tests to see if either of them are eligible to donate bone marrow to Charlie. The doctors discover that Jake cannot donate bone marrow as he is not Charlie's biological father, confirming that Justin is in fact Charlie's dad. Nancy finds Justin and tells him he is Charlie's dad and that he has leukaemia. Justin goes to the hospital and is found to be a perfect match for a bone marrow transplant, however, he is scared. Justin meets his son and cries with happiness. He tells Katy he is happy that something still exists of his relationship with Becca. Nancy and Jake break up on their wedding night after he tries to rape her. Nancy begs Justin to help her fight for custody of Charlie, Justin refuses. Justin tells Nancy that he cannot help her get custody because everything with him lying about Becca will be brought up and they will lose. Justin visits Charlie and tells him he will be better off without him.

In February, Nancy asks him again but Justin refuses. After witnessing and argument between Jake and Nancy, Justin goes to see her and tells her he is scared of getting close to Charlie and then losing him like Ali, Mel, Sophie and Becca. After noticing how cruel Jake is to Nancy, Justin tells her he will not let a monster like Jake raise his son and he will join her fight for custody. Due to Justin being busy with Charlie, Katy begins feeling rejected and gets closer to Zak Ramsey. Katy and Zak end up kissing. Justin apologises to a guilty Katy for not being there enough for her. Brought together with Charlie's leukaemia and custody battle, Justin and Nancy share a kiss and end up sleeping together, at the same time Katy is sleeping with Zak. Justin does not tell Katy he is helping Nancy get custody. He tells her he is going to fix a leak at Il Gnosh and leaves for Nancy's. At court, Justin tells Nancy that no judge will let a sick child be looked after by Jake. Nancy and Jake go into court and Justin sits outside with Jack and Frankie. Justin talks with Jack and Frankie asks him why he is even there. Jake begins to wind up Nancy in court and verbally abuses her with Frankie outside, Nancy runs off and Justin follows. Justin returns home where Katy asks him where he has been. He continues to tell her he was a t Il Gnosh but she reveals she went there and he was not there. Justin tells her the truth. She is disappointed but they make up.

Jake realises he is going to lose the custody battle and kidnaps Charlie. In his car, Jake tries to kill himself and Charlie. Justin and Katy rush to Nancy's and find Jake lying on the floor, Charlie in his cot and a panicking Nancy, who believes she has killed Jake. The paramedics turn up and Jake is nowhere to be seen. In April, Louise finds Katy in Zak's bed. She exposes their affair to Warren. Katy is furious to discover Warren killed Sean and also when Louise agrees to be an alibi for Warren on the night of Sean's death. Katy wants Warren to hand himself into the police and pay for his crimes. She verbally attacks both Warren and Louise, before hitting him. Justin catches Katy and Zak kissing each other in the student Halls, and flees, devastated while Katy calls after him. Katy and Justin talk as he decides to take her back. Katy realises she loves Justin and Zak so leaves in a taxi. Louise and Warren then stop the taxi and confront her. Katy tells Warren and Louise she can never forgive them and she hates them. She then leaves for good. The day after Katy's departure, heartbroken Justin moves back in with the Valentines.

Justin befriends Ste Hay and moves into his flat. Leila Roy develops a crush on Justin and accidentally knocks him over which gives him slight memory loss. Leila visits Justin in hospital and tells him she is his girlfriend. Ste is shocked as he does not think she is Justin's type, however, Justin reveals he has his memory back and he starts to make her do his washing and shopping. Justin tells Leila he knows she lied. The pair make up and agree to be friends. Leila gets Justin a job at the SU Bar. Justin begins to be jealous when Leila starts a relationship with Gilly Roach. At a fashion show at the SU bar, Justin is speechless at the sight of Leila while she walks down the runway in a bikini. Justin sees Leila breaking up with Gilly and takes the opportunity to ask her out, instead Leila turns him down saying the only reason he is asking her out is because he is shallow. Leila calls on Justin's help to paint a portrait of her family to cover up her studying Art instead of Law, which her father, Govinda, thinks she is doing. Justin paints it and sneaks out with the painting in order for Leila to paint on herself, however, Govinda catches him but instead of being angry, Gov is happy his daughter is doing something she loves and tells Justin all he has done, is shown how much he cares for Leila, mistaking him for her boyfriend. Justin and Leila return to the halls where they share a kiss and begin a relationship.

Leila and Justin's relationship started to die. Justin began to notice feelings for Hannah Ashworth at Josh Ashworth and Sasha Valentine's double 18th party at The Loft. Justin and Hannah kiss behind the bar at the SU Bar in April. Hannah's boyfriend, Ash catches the pair kissing, however does not say anything. Justin and Ash begin to compete for Hannah's affections and Ash challenges Justin to a bike race. Justin spends a week preparing an old bike and nearly pulls out, however he turns up for the race. Ash tampers with Justin's bike so he will not win. Hannah decides to have a go on Justin's bike and sets off. Ash tries to stop her but she ends up crashing and ends up in hospital. Ash tells Hannah's family that he saw Justin tampering with the bike. When questioned by Calvin Valentine, Ash admits that he did not actually see Justin tamper with the bike. Leila discovers Ash is responsible for the accident and sneaks Justin into Hannah's hospital room so he can tell her. Hannah does not believe Justin and throws him out. Suzanne asks Ash what he said to the police about Justin. He is forced to tell her he did not tell the police he saw Justin tamper with the bike. He then covers up by telling her Hannah has not been eating. When Hannah finds out, she realises Ash tampered with the bike and breaks up with him. Hannah apologises to Justin and tells him Ash told her family that she was not eating. Ash gets a call from the police informing him that the investigation has been dropped. Ash begs Hannah not to go to the police. Ravi Roy hears Ash's confession and he is horrified by what his brother had done and punches him. Hannah tells Justin she wants to be with him, however he is still angry with her for not believing him. With the help of McFly, Justin and Hannah finally get together when they make up.

Justin is invited to a meal with the Ashworths, however he feels guilty when he punches Rhys. Ash decides to make the Ashworths think Hannah is having a relapse of her anorexia by hiding food in her room. The Ashworths then think Justin is to blame. Justin and Hannah decide to leave Hollyoaks. He is approached by Warren, who tells him he will give him money if he gives him an alibi as they burn down The Loft. Hannah discovers Justin is doing a deal with Warren. He tells her it is one deal and they can leave. Justin heads to The Loft. On his way, he meets Calvin, who warns him to stay away. Calvin does not tell him that Clare is back and has tied Warren up and poured petrol around The Loft. Justin changes his mind and heads back to his flat, on the way he is seen by Sasha Valentine. Hannah waits at Justin and Ste's flat with her bags. Hannah realises Justin is at The Loft and leaves to find him.

Hannah enters The Loft but is knocked out by Clare, who assumes it was Justin. She comes round and attacks Clare, who drops the match setting The Loft on fire. Hannah and Clare fight and crash through the banister and drop to the floor below. Justin rushes from his flat to The Loft, which he and Ste discover is on fire. Justin enters The Loft. Justin finds Warren tied to a chair and begins to untie him with Hannah nowhere to be seen. Warren tells Justin that Hannah is not in The Loft until he hears Hannah's cries for help and realises that Warren has lied. Justin rushes to Hannah's aid and finds her at the bottom of the stairs not being able to move. He tries to go down the stairs but they collapse. Justin jumps down and picks her up. Justin pleads with Calvin on the other side of the door to unlock it. He finally does and Justin gets Hannah out. An ambulance arrives, however Ste tells Justin she is dead as the paramedics struggle to revive her. Sasha then accuses Justin of starting the fire as she saw him outside before. Justin then runs away, thinking Hannah is dead. Justin goes to Mel and Sophie's graves, where he is joined by Russ. Russ informs Justin that Hannah did actually survive the fire and is recovering in hospital. Justin goes to visit her but her family believe he is responsible for the fire even after she tells them that it was Clare. Josh helps Hannah leave hospital without being seen to pack a bag and leave with Justin. Justin and Hannah meet in the cemetery and she tells him that she wants to go with him. Justin is wary knowing that she will have to leave her family and go on the run, something he could never ask her to do. He tells Hannah he loves her and to say goodbye to his sisters. Justin leaves and hides behind a wall when he hears a car pull up. Russ comes out of the car and approaches him. Russ, who has taken his son Max from Jacqui McQueen offers him a lift. The pair get in the car and drive off, leaving Hannah devastated.

On 12 April 2023 it was revealed that Justin had been killed off-screen on 5 October 2022 at age 33 in a drink driving accident, 16 years after his sisters’ deaths.

== Reception ==
Chris Fountain was nominated for various awards for his role as Justin, including 'Sexiest Male' at The British Soap Awards in 2006, 2007 and 2009. In 2008, Fountain won the award for 'Best Actor', an award he had been nominated for in 2006 and 2007. In 2006, Justin and Becca's affair won 'Best Storyline'. He was also nominated for 'Best Actor' in the 2007 and 2009 Inside Soap Awards. He was also nominated for Most Popular Actor at the 2006 National Television Awards. Following Justin's offscreen death revelation in 2023, Sarah Ellis from Inside Soap questioned whether Justin was actually dead as viewers had not seen his death happen onscreen.
