= Max Cunningham =

UK soap opera character, created 1995

- Hollyoaks character
- Matt Littler as Max Cunningham (2007)
- Portrayed by: Ben Sheriff (1995–1997); Matt Littler (1997–2008)
- Duration: 1995–2008
- First appearance: Episode 5; 13 November 1995
- Last appearance: Episode 2340; 11 July 2008
- Created by: Phil Redmond
In-universe information
- Occupation: Businessman
- Family: Cunningham
- Father: Gordon Cunningham
- Mother: Angela Cunningham
- Stepfather: Terry Williams
- Stepmother: Helen Cunningham
- Sisters: Dawn Cunningham; Cindy Cunningham; Jude Cunningham
- Half-brothers: Tom Cunningham
- Wife: Clare Devine (2006–2007); Steph Dean (2008)
- Nephews: Alfie Nightingale; Hilton Cunningham; Maddox Keane
- Nieces: Bethany Cunningham; Holly Cunningham; Steph Cunningham-Lomax

Max Cunningham is a fictional character from the British Channel 4 soap opera Hollyoaks, played by Ben Sheriff from 1995 to 1997, and Matt Littler from 1997 to 2008. He first appeared on 13 November 1995, and Littler took over the role in September 1997. In 2008, Max was the second longest running character in Hollyoaks, after Tony Hutchinson (Nick Pickard). In May 2008, it was announced that Littler had decided to leave the show and would depart in July 2008.

== Character creation ==
The character of Max first appeared in 1995 as one of the original Hollyoaks characters. At this time, he was played by actor Ben Sheriff. Hollyoaks producer Phil Redmond decided to recast the character in 1997 when he found Matt Littler. Littler spoke of playing an already established character stating: "I didn't really watch it much, so it didn't really affect me" and also revealed he had met with Sheriff and his career was fine post filming. Littler portrayed the role for almost eleven years until his decision to leave the show in 2008.

== Development ==
=== Family deaths ===
Max found himself surrounded by death, with older sister Dawn dying of leukaemia in 1997. His stepbrother Lewis committed suicide in 2001. His death made Max look at life in a different way, deciding to spend less time with friend OB and open a new business, a burger van. Max also began dating Jodie Nash, however it was soon over. In 2004, Max saw more misery when his father Gordon and stepmother Helen were killed in a car crash. Max took it upon himself to raise younger half brother Tom. In 2006, another death hit the family, this time Max's step niece Grace Hutchinson, who died to suspected Sudden Infant Death Syndrome. With the four deaths, Max decided to live his life to the full rather than not get to live in at all. Max then met and fell in love with Clare Devine.

=== Marriage to Clare ===
Max found himself engaged to Clare Devine, who he had previously hired as an event organiser for The Loft. OB saw through gold-digging Clare and tried to tell Max. Max and OB ended up falling out over Clare. After Max suffered a heart attack, Clare took it upon herself to make sure he never recovered. She started tampering with his pills. During Christmas in a secluded cottage, Max found out that Clare had tampered with his pills and realised OB was right about her. Clare had put Tom's jacket in an icy lake outside, which made Max jump in. Clare the revealed Tom was in no danger as he was not in the lake. Luckily, OB turned up and rescued Max. Clare called the social services and told them Max was hurting Tom, and also told Tom that he was the cause of his parents and Grace's deaths and if he spoke to Max, Max would die. Clare, who had built up many enemies in Hollyoaks, was pushed over a balcony at The Loft and was left for dead. Max and OB were two of the suspects, however Max's name was soon cleared. Max made a visit to a recovering Clare at her home and threatened her, telling her if she did not tell the social services she made Max's abuse of Tom up, he would kill her. Clare then agreed. Clare was forced out of Hollyoaks, however kidnapped Katy Fox. Max, Warren Fox and Justin Burton followed Clare to save her. A high speed car chase led to Clare and Katy plummeting over a quarry into water below. Warren and Justin jumped in to save Katy. Max then leapt in to save Clare, even though she had repeatedly tried to kill him. Under the water, Max tried to save Clare who was pulled away by the current and apparently drowned. Back in Hollyoaks, Max had a heart to heart with Steph Dean, who told Max it was not his fault Clare had died.

=== Second love ===
Max and Steph grew closer and eventually found themselves in love. The pair found themselves breaking up on several occasions. Steph then embarked on a relationship with Niall Rafferty, however, realising she loved Max, ended it and got back with Max. Max and Steph then announced their engagement. Matt Littler made the decision to leave the show after eleven years. Speaking of his decision to leave, Littler stated, "I feel that I have grown up on Hollyoaks over the past eleven years and I'm not only leaving behind friends but also family. I wouldn't change a second of my time at Hollyoaks and working with Darren Jon Jefferies has been amazing – every second of it! I'd just like to thank everyone who has made my life at Hollyoaks a very happy one." It was also announced that Max's departure would involve his wedding to Steph. Hollyoaks producer Bryan Kirkwood commented on what the future holds for Littler, stating, "Matt, together with Darren Jon Jefferies have created a partnership in Max and O.B. that has been at the heart of Hollyoaks success for the last eleven years. Matt is a talented directed as well as a successful actor and although Max's exit marks the end of an era on screen, Matt's not going too far as he will be directing a few episodes of Hollyoaks in the not too distant future."

On their wedding day, Niall, still angry and upset over his break-up with Steph, raced off in his car, unknowingly towards Tom. Max saw this and pushed Tom out of the way, however Niall ended up running him over. Max died in OB's arms with Steph and Tom also present. Max's final appearance was the month following his death. While OB was leaving for a new life in America, he turned around and saw Max standing outside Drive 'n' Buy.

== Storylines ==
Max first appears as part of the youngest child of Cunningham family in 1995. His parents were already divorced, as his mother was remarried. Max is devastated when he learns that Dawn Cunningham had an affair with Jack Osborne leading to their daughter Bethany, being put up for adoption. Dawn later dies from with leukaemia and the family have several other tragedies over the years Max and his best friend OB, make up money-making schemes, and create their own single. The CD became a failure. Max starts working at Hollyoaks College. When his stepbrother Lewis commits suicide, Max decides to make the most of his life, opening a burger van and going on a date with Jodie Nash. Max reveals his sensitive side in his affection for Anna Green, helping her during the difficult stages of her pregnancy. Max and Anna both admit their feelings to each other and they have sex in his van. Anna tells her boyfriend Alex Bell about the affair and she moves in with Max and her son Charlie. Max finds it difficult staying with Anna as he does not have much time for social life. Another tragedy hits Max whilst he, OB, Ben Davies, Kristian Hargreaves, Jamie Nash and Theo Sankofa go potholing. The trip results in a rock fall and leaves Theo and Jamie dead. After returning home, Max ends his relationship with Anna.

OB tells Max that his stepmother Helen Cunningham is having an affair with Tony Hutchinson. Max is angered by Helen and Tony's actions towards his father so he warns them if they continue, he will tell Gordon. Helen and Tony continue their affair so Max tells a devastated Gordon. Helen then leaves Gordon for Tony and prepares to leave. During a journey together, Gordon and Helen are involved in a car accident when Gordon suffers a heart attack at the wheel of the car. Their son Tom is not injured, but Gordon and Helen die, leaving Max as Tom's legal guardian. Max's stepsister Mandy and OB supports Max. After Tom burns down the house after playing with firecrackers, the social services arrive. Max tells Mandy he thinks Tom should be put into care, which Tom overhears. Tom then runs away from home and is found at his parents grave. Max, OB and Tom then move into the flat next to Mandy and her fiancé Tony.

Tony makes OB and Max managers of The Loft after the pair work hard to show him they are responsible. Tony eventually gives The Loft to them as a Christmas present. Max and OB's first major decision for the club is to hire an events organiser, Clare Devine. Both Max and OB immediately fall for Clare. After an ultimatum, Clare chooses Max. Max and Clare's relationship begins well and Max asks her to move in with him, OB and Tom. OB's girlfriend Mel Burton catches Clare having an affair with Sean Kennedy and tries to tell Max. Due to her alcoholism, no one believes Mel except OB, causing a drift between Max and OB. Max and Clare get engaged. OB tries to make Max see Clare's true self, however is unsuccessful. At their wedding, OB bursts in begging Max to rethink his engagement. Max hits him and vows never to speak to him again. After the wedding, Max tells her he wants to start a family. Clare fakes being pregnant and also a miscarriage and tells Max she cannot have children. After finding Clare and Warren Fox taking cocaine, Max decides to join them and takes some as well. This causes a heart attack which leads to Max having to go on medication. Clare begins to tamper with this medication in order to bring on a second heart attack. During a Christmas break at an isolated cottage, Max finds the tampered medication and realises the truth. On seeing Tom supposedly in an icy lake, Max jumps in after him, however Clare has tricked him and refuses to help. OB arrives, punches Clare, saves Max and struggles to revive him. Luckily, he does. Max apologises to OB over not believing him. After Clare threatens him, Max signs The Loft over to Clare. With their friendship back on track, Max and OB open a juice bar called MOBS.

Clare is pushed over the balcony of The Loft and Max becomes one of five named suspects for her attempted murder. Tony and Dom give Max their alibi for the night. Clare returns from hospital and tells social services Max is hurting Tom. Max breaks into Clare's flat and threatens to kill her if she does not tell them she made everything up, which she does. Clare signs The Loft over to Warren Fox and is forced out of Hollyoaks. She also discovers Justin Burton pushed her over The Loft balcony. In revenge, Clare kidnaps Katy Fox. Warren, Justin and Max set off to find her. After a dangerous car chase, Clare's car goes over a quarry into water below. Warren and Justin jump in after Katy while Max attempts to save Clare. Clare is dragged underwater by a current and apparently drowns, however is revealed to have survived. Max tells Steph Dean of his guilt over letting Clare die and have a heart to heart, in which they appear to grow close.

Steph begins helping Max look after Tom. The pair begin to fall for each other. After several failed attempts, Max finally tells Steph his true feelings and they begin a relationship. With Max spending more time with Steph, OB begins to feel left out. OB befriends Simon Crosby, who apparently turns out to be a paedophile. Max and Jake Dean attack Simon's home with other residents. Innocent Simon tries to commit suicide, however survives. After Max discovers Simon was innocent, he apologises to OB, who is disgusted, although they later made up. OB decides to leave for London with girlfriend Summer Shaw. Max and Tom bare OB a sad farewell as he leaves. Max decides to propose to Steph, which she accepts. Max and Steph's engagement is short-lived when they split up and she seeks comfort in Niall Rafferty. Niall falls in love with Steph, who then gets back together with Max. With the wedding back on, Max's mother Angela, sister Cindy, niece Holly, stepsister Mandy and also OB return for his wedding, except for his older sister Jude, who cannot attend to the wedding due to being wanted by the police ten years earlier, and Steph father Johnno. After a perfect wedding, distraught Niall speeds off in his car. Max sees him driving unknowingly towards Tom and rushes to him, pushing him out of the way in time. Max is hit by Niall's car. Max is held by OB and Tom as he bleeds. Steph rushes to his side as he dies.

== Reception ==
For his portrayal of Max, Matt Littler won the 'Outstanding Serial Drama Performance' at the 2008 National Television Awards. Subsequent to his National Television Awards nomination, the character has also won the award for 'Best On-screen Partnership' with Darren Jeffries (OB) at The 2008 British Soap Awards. The same year, Littler, along with Gemma Bissix (Clare), Jamie Lomas (Warren), Chris Fountain (Justin) and Hannah Tointon (Katy), won the award for 'Spectacular Scene of the Year' for Clare kidnapping Katy and driving the car over the edge of the cliff. In 2009, Littler's exit from the show got his nominated for 'Best Exit' and 'Best Single Episode' for Max and Steph's wedding day. The character was selected as one of the "top 100 British soap characters" by industry experts for a poll to be run by What's on TV, with readers able to vote for their favourite character to discover "Who is Soap's greatest Legend?" Max and Steph were awarded the "Favourite Couple" prize at the 2007 Hollyoaks Awards.

Virgin Media profiled Max and O.B's double act, stating: "This pair have fallen out more times than you can shake a stick at. Both mischievous, they are a bit of a double act but have grown more serious in recent times." In response to Gordon and Helen being killed off in their car crash storyline, Inside Soap's Sam Soap thought it was "great" and wished that producers had also killed off the entire Cunningham family because of their "grumpy faces". His colleague Lucy Lather disagreed, adding Hollyoaks "wouldn't be the same without Mandy and Max."
