= Mel Burton =

- Hollyoaks character
- Portrayed by: Cassie Powney
- Duration: 2003–2006
- First appearance: 23 September 2003
- Last appearance: 8 September 2006
- Introduced by: Jo Hallows
In-universe information
- Occupation: College student Beautician
- Father: Michael Burton
- Mother: Liz Burton
- Stepfather: Richard Taylor
- Brothers: Justin Burton; Ali Taylor (step)
- Sisters: Sophie Burton; Darlene Taylor (step)

Mel Burton is a fictional character from the British television soap opera Hollyoaks, played by actress Cassie Powney. She made her first appearance during the episode broadcast on 23 September 2003. Powney joined the cast along with her twin Connie Powney, who plays Mel's twin sister Sophie Burton. They auditioned for the roles six months after deciding they should stop putting themselves forward for twin roles. Mel was introduced along with Joe Spencer (Matt Milburn) and Robbie Flynn (Andy Newton), as new students attending Hollyoaks College. The character's family were introduced a month later. Mel is characterised as being clever, introverted and more controlled than her sister.

== Casting ==
Cassie Powney was cast as Mel and her identical twin sister Connie Powney was cast as Sophie. The audition for the roles came up about six months after the sisters decided to stop putting themselves forward for twin roles. Of joining the serial and moving away from her home town, Cassie stated: "I've always been a fan of Hollyoaks and I'm really excited about getting to know everyone. I won't be too homesick as I'll be with Connie so the move is quite an adventure." Cassie admitted that it took the cast and crew about a year to work out who was who, but she explained that she usually has straight hair, while her sister's is curly. Their personalities also differ greatly and Powney felt that despite being the eldest, Connie was more "authoritative and organised". Powney made her first appearance as Mel on 23 September 2003.

== Development ==
=== Introduction and early storylines ===
Mel was introduced along with fellow new characters Joe Spencer (Matt Milburn) and Robbie Flynn (Andy Newton) during Freshers' Week at Hollyoaks College. Milburn liked that he, Powney and Newton all started at the same time because that meant they were all going through the same experiences. The three actors also shared a house together off-screen. Mel was also the first member of the Burton family to be introduced to the show. Around a month later, Mel is joined by her mother, her mother's boyfriend and her siblings, including her twin sister Sophie. Powney said her character is "particularly peeved" when her family move to Hollyoaks, as she wanted to attend college without any pressure from their presence. Powney also said "she's not happy at the way twin sister Sophie cramps her style." Sophie realises that Mel has not told her friends she has a twin sister, so she gets revenge by wearing identical clothing to a student night and confusing Mel's friends with her different behaviour. Sophie kisses Mel's friend Joe to wind her sister up, a decision that Connie Powney said was "awful" as Joe then believes Mel has feelings for him. Connie said Sophie was the more "flirty, crazy sister, while Mel is much more controlled." The official Hollyoaks website describes Mel as "quiet, clever and introverted". She thinks Sophie's way of getting attention from people is "highly irritating".

In an attempt to step out of her sister's shadow and attract the attention of Kristian Hargreaves (Max Brown), Mel undergoes a drastic makeover. The storyline begins when Mel traps Kristian into going on a double date with Sophie and Joe, as he agrees without thinking. Powney commented that it was not such a good start to their relationship. During the date, it becomes obvious that Kristian is more interested in Sophie, which makes Mel more determined to get his attention, but she ends up embarrassing herself by dancing on the bar in The Loft. Powney said "Mel is sick of feeling second best – men always fancy Sophie instead of her." Mel enlists Robbie to help her change her image by conducting a survey asking men about their perfect woman. After they gather the results, Robbie designs the ideal woman on his laptop and Mel unveils her new look at the student union bar that night. Powney explained to Helen Crossley of Inside Soap that while Mel loves the effect her makeover has on the men, especially Kristian, her sister is "traumatised" and "horrified" that Mel would go to such lengths. Mel is "thrilled" when Kristian flirts with her and they later have sex, but Kristian makes it clear that their night together was a one off, leaving Mel humiliated and out for revenge. She and Sophie team up to embarrass Kristian by pretending that they want a threesome with him. Powney admitted that acting out the storyline with her real sister was "surreal".

In the lead up to her mother, Liz Burton's (Andrée Bernard) wedding to Richard Taylor (Richard Calkin), Mel agrees to be a bridesmaid. Bernard said Liz is delighted as Mel has taken some persuading. Following the wedding, Mel overhears her stepbrother Ali Taylor (Luti Fagbenle) telling Richard that her father's death was suicide rather than a heart attack. Bernard commented that "all hell breaks loose!" Mel confronts her mother at the reception, devastating her brother Justin (Chris Fountain). Things are made worse when Mel and Justin realise that Sophie knew the truth because she found their father's body. Of Liz's decision to keep the truth from her children, Bernard explained: "Liz thought she was doing what was best by keeping it from Mel and Justin, because she wanted to protect them. But now it's out, they have to revisit their grief all over again." The actress added the storyline would have "far-reaching" consequences for the whole family.

=== Relationship with O.B. ===
In early 2005, writers paired Mel and Sophie with best friends Sam "O.B." O'Brien (Darren Jeffries) and Max Cunningham (Matt Littler). The relationships develop after O.B. and Max ask Mel to babysit Max's brother Tom Cunningham (Ellis Hollins), while they go on a night out to meet women. After an unsuccessful night, Max returns home to relieve Mel and ends up arranging a date with her. Littler told an Inside Soap writer that the pair decide to keep the date a secret, as they are both of afraid of being hurt. O.B. later secures a date with Sophie, but they have a bad time together. Littler said that for his date, Max thinks Mel will be impressed by his caring side, so he talks about Tom throughout their date, but this does not go down well. The actor stated "Poor Mel is bored out of her mind and it's fair to say she's not tempted to take their friendship any further." Weeks later, Mel offers to help O.B. with his new business venture, which leads to them becoming friends. Jeffries explained that both characters secretly want to be in a relationship, but they are "putting on a brave face!"

Mel later sets O.B. up on a blind date with a friend, but it goes badly as they have nothing in common. Thinking that Mel needs her confidence boosting, he pays Ben Davies (Marcus Patric) to take Mel out, but Ben stands her up and then she overhears him arguing with O.B. about money. Mel is "simply furious", but the pair soon sort out their misunderstanding. Jeffries thought there was "a definite chemistry" between Mel and O.B., but noted that they are both in denial. He also called his character "the eternal bachelor" and said it would take someone special to change him, but he reckoned it might be Mel. After establishing a relationship, Jeffries believed that as far as O.B. was concerned, he and Mel were "made for each other". Powney disagreed and thought neither couple would last, as both sisters were high maintenance. She added, "it'll be interesting to see whether Max and OB have got what it takes to hang onto them. I'm not expecting wedding bells, let's put it that way!"

Mel and O.B.'s relationship suffers as she develops a problem with alcohol. When she is thrown out of her home, after slapping her mother, Mel begs O.B. to let her stay at the Cunningham house. Max is not keen on the idea due to Mel's behaviour when she drinks, so O.B. has to go behind his back. Powney stated that her character was "selfish and doesn't consider what she's doing to Max and OB's friendship." When Max goes on holiday, O.B. sneaks Mel back in and insists that she keeps her drinking to a minimum and concentrate on her college dissertation, however, Mel is unable to resist drinking from a secret stash of vodka. Max's girlfriend Clare Devine (Gemma Bissix) later catches Mel stealing money from O.B.'s wallet. Powney pointed out that Clare and Mel have never liked each other, and now Clare has ammunition against Mel and will likely use it. Max returns from Spain and is "furious" with O.B. for going against his wishes, leaving Mel's future "looking bleak".

=== Binge drinking ===
In an issue-led storyline for the character, Mel develops a dependence on alcohol and regularly goes on "disastrous drinking binges", which end up badly affecting her employment chances and relationships. Powney told Dawn Collinson of the Liverpool Echo that she initially had reservations about taking on the storyline, saying "I actually dreaded it because thought, here we go. I've got months of no make-up, looking a state and having to be believably drunk which I think is one of the most difficult things for an actor to do." She had to work out how to get a balance in her acting as she did not want to be accused of "hamming it up", but she thought she had done well as people had told her she was convincing. Powney used her own experiences with alcohol and nights out to help her with the scripts, commenting "you know what it's like to get a bit carried away one night and then absolutely regret it". She thought was the about the extent of the research she could do. Powney grew to enjoy the storyline, as it gave her a chance to feel like someone else and use her acting skills.

The storyline also shows how Mel puts her health at risk by binge drinking and how she deals with the consequences. Although she promises her mother and sister that she will quit, Mel carries on drinking heavily. Powney said that Liz and Sophie "are sick of her hangovers", but Mel goes out and gets drunk again, before making a fool of herself at the student union bar. Speaking to Helen Crossley of Inside Soap, Powney explained that Mel makes it her mission to get with one of the university "bad boys" and does not let anything get in her way, even though her friends realise that she is showing herself up and try to "talk sense into her". As she drinks more and more, Mel's "judgement goes out the window" and she eventually leaves with the man. Mel regrets her decision in the morning, as she wakes up and does not know his name. After doing the "walk of shame", Mel lies to her family about where she has been. Powney told Crossley that this is not Mel's biggest problem, as she later confesses to Sophie that she had unprotected sex, which leads to scenes of Sophie taking Mel to get the morning-after pill. Their mother is "furious" when she finds out and takes Mel to a GUM clinic, where she insists that Mel is tested for everything, including HIV. Of Mel's reaction, Powney commented "Only then does Mel realise the danger she's put herself in – the test could come back positive." Powney also said that Mel is actually appalled with herself for doing something this stupid, and is suddenly aware that she has some serious issues to address. The actress added that there would be "some tough times" ahead for her character.

Mel continues drinking as she deals with being raped and struggles with her place in the family, who she feels blames her for their problems. Mel eventually agrees to attend an alcohol abuse awareness group where she meets Kate, who is only there to make her mother happy. Powney explained that "Something in Kate really seems to strike a chord with Mel. It brings her to the conclusion that she likes drinking, so why should she deny herself?" Kate persuades Mel to sneak out to the pub with her, leading Powney to point out that her character just does not realise how serious her problem with alcohol is. Mel is left alone at the bar when Kate notices that she has a male admirer. Powney said Mel "homes in" on the man's wallet as she is so concerned about her next drink, but when he touches her shoulder, she "freaks out" as it brings back memories of her rape. Justin walks in at that moment and punches the man, which Powney thought was his way of showing he cares about his sister. Mel's drinking causes problems for her relationship with O.B. after she gets drunk during a double date with Max and Clare Devine (Gemma Bissix). Feeling annoyed with O.B., after he suggests she apologise to the other couple, Mel goes out and has a one-night stand with a stranger.

When Mel's drinking causes her sister to be hospitalised, she finally vows to quit drinking. Before the incident, Mel intends to stop drinking and Powney said her character is genuine, but she is clearly going to have a tough time. She continued, "Sophie and their mum, Liz, are supportive, but they remain sceptical because Mel's let them down so many times before." The pair decide to keep Mel inside the house to dry out, which Powney thought was a bad idea, as Mel is aggravated by her mother bossing her around. Mel eventually manages to sneak out and buy a bottle of vodka. Sophie later finds her sister in a drunken and irrational state, which leads to a fight between them. Powney said Mel is only focused on the bottle in Sophie's hand and as she tries to grab it, Sophie is thrown down the stairs outside the house. Sophie is not badly injured, but Mel is "horrified" by what could have happened. Powney added "it's this that makes her finally turn the corner and vow to return to alcohol counselling. But I have no idea whether it'll actually do the trick this time..."

=== Rape ===
Towards the end of 2005, producer David Hanson confirmed that "life won't get any easier" for the Burton/Taylor family while discussing upcoming storylines. He revealed that the twins would be involved in "a horrific incident", which would affect the whole family, while Mel's binge drinking would worsen. During the late night special Hollyoaks: No Going Back, Mel and Sophie are targeted by serial rapist Andy Holt (Warren Brown). Andy drugs them both and offers his friend Sam Owen (Louis Tamone) the chance to rape Sophie, but Sam cannot go through with it, as he has feelings for her. Andy drags Mel off and rapes her, but he is angry with Sam for leaving Sophie. One of Andy's previous victims Dannii Carbone (Christina Baily) later attempts to kill herself, but Mel, Sophie and Louise Summers (Roxanne McKee) stop her, before they decide to report Andy to the police. Tamone commented "Sam's horrified because the twins have been to the police. But Andy doesn't seem worried". During a confrontation between Sam, Andy and Russ Owen (Stuart Manning), Andy falls down a quarry and is presumed dead. After telling her family about her rape, Mel's drinking gets worse and Sophie urges her to seek help. Powney told an Inside Soap columnist: "Mel has spiralled further out of control since her horrific rape ordeal at the hands of Andy Holt." Mel's behaviour becomes more reckless in the weeks after the rape and she also becomes more promiscuous. Powney called her character "stubborn" and said she was throwing herself at men to prove that the rape has not affected her.

Any returns in the late night special Hollyoaks: Back from the Dead. He kidnaps Sam and Russ's sister Nicole Owen (Ciara Janson) and holds her hostage in a warehouse, but Mel helps rescue her before Andy can rape her too. Mel manages to drug Andy, who later dies after becoming impaled on a pole. Afterwards, Mel considers turning herself into the police. Manning told Sarah Ellis of Inside Soap, "Ultimately, Mel wasn't responsible for Andy's death, but blames herself because she was the one who drugged him." Sophie asks Russ to help her convince her sister that it was not her fault and to persuade her to move on with her life, but Manning reckoned that Mel is not sure she will be able to.

=== Departure ===
Both Powney sisters departed the show in early September 2006, as their characters were killed off during a large fire at the Dog In The Pond pub. The stunt serves as the conclusion to Sam Owen's revenge storyline and saw a total of five characters die. Tamone said initially Sam's "master plan" is to kidnap Sophie and lock her up in a cage, as she was the person who set him up to be arrested. After learning of her whereabouts from Nicole, Sam then "totally flips" when he discovers Sophie is dating Russ, so he goes to the pub with a can of petrol and a lighter. Tamone explained that it is a while before viewers find out who has died, as the episode opens with a number of body bags being brought out the building, before flashbacks show who is in them. Discussing the reason for the twins' exits in Inside Soap, producer Bryan Kirkwood explained "Sometimes, though, you have to make hard decisions about popular characters for the good of the show, as was the case with Mel and Sophie." He praised the Powneys, and said their departures would give Justin a big storyline and help to shape where he went next within the serial.

== Storylines ==
Mel arrives as a fresher to attend Hollyoaks Community College. She becomes friends with Robbie Flynn and Joe Spencer. Mel begins to fall for Darren Osborne, but when the pair sleep together, Darren makes it clear that it is just a one-night stand. Mel's family soon arrive in Hollyoaks, including her twin sister Sophie. Mel strongly resents her sister's presence in Hollyoaks as she fears that she will get more attention than her, especially as she is planning to join HCC as well. Unlike Sophie, Mel is quiet and introverted and often feels inferior to her more outgoing sister. Mel and Sophie begin dating respectively Max Cunningham and Sam "O.B." O'Brien, who initially cannot tell them apart. While Mel ks originally partnered with Max, he soon realises he prefers Sophie and Mel becomes closer to O.B.

Things do not get any easier for Mel as her mother Liz's partner Richard moves in with the Burtons with his two children. Mel finds it hard to live with her mother's new partner. During Liz and Richard's wedding, Mel learns the truth about her father's death – that he had committed suicide. Mel's younger brother Justin goes off the rails, while Mel also cannot understand her father's actions and turns to drink. Her behaviour gets out of control and she begin having drunken one night stands before beginning a proper relationship with O.B. Despite the pair seeming compatible, Mel's drinking often gets in the way, which lead to Mel ending her relationship with OB.

At the 2005 Student Union bar summer party, Mel gets extremely drunk and, believing that she still lives in her old house, smashes a window with a statue of a tiger. The police arrest Mel for being drunk and disorderly. The following day, she wakes up in a police cell and has no idea why she is in there. Mel is then released and vows to give up drinking, but she relapses.

One night when she is drunk, Mel has unprotected sex with a stranger and fears that she has caught a sexually transmitted disease, but the tests come back negative. Mel curbs her drinking problem to an extent after this traumatic experience, but she still struggles with alcoholism.

Serial date-rapist Andy Holt targets the Burton sisters around Christmas 2005. He spikes Mel and Sophie's drinks with the date rape drug GHB after getting an invite to their house. Although Andy rapes Mel that night, Sophie escapes a similar fate because Andy's fellow rapist Sam Owen decides that he cannot hurt Sophie because he has genuine feelings for her. After the rape, Mel and Sophie recover from the drowsiness of the drugs enough to piece together that Andy has supposedly raped them both, although they are unaware that Sam was involved. Mel and Sophie go to the police to make their accusations, but Andy disappears before he can be charged. Tests by the police proved that Sophie has not been raped, causing friction between the sisters as they wonder why only Mel has been raped. Turning once again to alcohol to block out her problems, Mel falls into a drink-induced coma on New Year's Eve 2005. While she is in hospital being treated, Mel admits to Liz that she has been raped. Mel carries on drinking despite OB trying to help Mel with her problems.

While attending a funfair with OB, Mel spots Andy and manages to track him down just in time after he takes Nicole, Russ and Sam Owen hostage. Mel gives Andy a taste of his own medicine as Mel drugs Andy with GHB and ties him up. Mel grabs a pole and violently hits Andy around the head with it, which knocks Andy unconscious for about ten minutes. When Andy awakes, Mel calls him a coward and a bully. Andy manages to escape whilst Mel is untying Nicole, Russ and Sam. Mel realises that he has escaped and chases after him, which leads to Andy facing his own woeful death as he is impaled on a sharpened spike after running into the unlit warehouse cellar. Despite Andy finally getting what he deserved, it isn't enough for Mel, who continues to drink heavily. Eventually, it is discovered that Sam was Andy's date-rape partner in crime and Sophie manages to trick him into surrendering at the police station.

OB offers Mel a job at the nightclub he and Max are managing, The Loft. Max is reluctant for Mel to work there because of her alcoholism, and Mel soon develops a rivalry with Max's girlfriend Clare Devine, after Clare sees Mel drinking behind the bar instead of working. One night while babysitting Max's brother Tom with OB, Mel fills a coke can with vodka and Tom drinks some, leading to him becoming ill. When Max finds out what Mel has done, he fires her from The Loft. However, while Max is away, Mel continues to work for OB and walks in on Clare having a fling with Sean Kennedy in the nightclub office. Clare uses Mel's drinking problem against her to convince Max and OB that she is lying, although OB later sides with Mel, ending his friendship with Max.

After failing her degree, Mel carries on drinking until Sophie takes a bottle of vodka away from her that she had been hiding in her wardrobe. Consequently, the girls have a fight at the top of the stairs. As Mel tries to grab the vodka she accidentally pushes Sophie down the stairs, leaving her sister unconscious and fighting for her life in hospital. Sophie thankfully survives and forgives Mel, who begins attending a support group for her alcoholism.

Mel begins working at the salon Evissa with Sophie and sleeps with Warren Fox. Mel thinks that they are now in a relationship, but Warren tells her that it was just a one off, leaving her heartbroken. Mel then gets a job with a team called Zedex and her manager asks her to join them for a drink at the local pub. Initially Mel turns down the offer but then reluctantly agrees. Mel gets very drunk and upon returning home she looks through all the cupboards for some vodka, trashing plates and throwing things around the room. The next day Mel cannot remember what had happened, so Sophie tells her everything. When Mel goes to work she gets sacked for making a fool of herself, losing some private Zedex papers and being hours late. After this, Mel never drinks again.

Mel, along with Sophie, move in with Louise Summers after Liz moves away and sells the Burton house. She is initially unemployed but is given her old job back at the salon. Mel managed to catch Clare once again cheating on Max, as she sees her sleeping with Warren on CCTV footage. After successfully recording the footage, Mel turns to OB with the evidence, and the pair confront a worried Clare in the pub, The Dog in The Pond, in September 2006. However, Sam Owen has escaped from prison and bursts into the pub, setting the place on fire. Mel is last seen jumping on Sam in an attempt to stop him attacking Sophie. Mel and Sophie die in the explosion, along with Sam, student Olivia Johnson and Mel's friend Joe. Mel's charred body is later seen by OB in the pub.

== Reception ==
While writing about their disappointment with the show's new characters, an Inside Soap columnist called Mel and Sophie "just plain irritating". Mel was unpopular with Lucy Lather from Inside Soap. When Gordon Cunningham (Bernard Latham) and Helen Cunningham (Kathryn George) were killed off in a car crash plot, Lather wished that the show's producers had also killed off both Mel and Sophie "while they were at it".
