= Connie Powney =

English actress

- Born: 22 May 1983 (age 42); Eastbourne, England
- Occupation: Actress
- Years active: 2002–present
- Children: 1

Connie Powney (born May 1983) is a British actress. She is best known for playing the role of Sophie Burton in the Channel 4 television series Hollyoaks. She has a twin sister, Cassie, who also appeared on the programme.

== Career ==
Powney played the role of Sophie Burton in the soap opera Hollyoaks, alongside her sister Cassie (who played Mel Burton).

As an actor, Connie appeared in several twin roles with Cassie, including a twin role in the 2003 film What a Girl Wants which also starred Amanda Bynes.

She was nominated for the Best Actress Award at the 2006 British Soap Awards but lost out to Lacey Turner.

== Filmography ==
Year	Title	Role	Notes	Ref.
2002	Dalziel and Pascoe	Twin 1	2 episodes	
2003	What A Girl Wants	Pear Orwood		
2003–2006	Hollyoaks	Sophie Burton	Regular role	
2006	Hollyoaks: Back from the Dead	Sophie Burton		
2013	Crackanory	Zoe Two	1 episode	
