= O.B. (Hollyoaks) =

UK soap opera character, created 1997

Sam "O.B." O'Brien
- Hollyoaks character
- Portrayed by: Darren Jeffries
- Duration: 1997–2008, 2016–2017
- First appearance: 6 October 1997
- Last appearance: 2 January 2017
- Introduced by: Jo Hallows (1997); Bryan Kirkwood (2008, 2016)
In-universe information
- Occupation: Entrepreneur

Sam "O.B." O'Brien is a fictional character in the long-running Channel 4 British television soap opera Hollyoaks, played by Darren Jeffries. He debuted on-screen on 6 October 1997 before leaving on 26 February 2008. He later made a brief return in July of the same year, last appearing on 11 July. O.B.'s storylines revolved around his friendship with Max Cunningham and several relationships. The character has been described as iconic and is most notable for his "classic comedy duo" status with Max. Jefferies was nominated for several awards for his time on the show. During a Hollyoaks live video in October 2016, it was announced that Jeffries would be returning to the role. O.B returned on 17 November 2016 and made his last appearance on 2 January 2017.

== Casting ==
Actor Darren Jefferies studied drama for three weeks prior to successfully auditioning for the role of O.B. On 15 November 2007 it was announced that Jeffries had decided to leave the serial. On his decision to leave Jefferies said it was so he could pursue "new challenges" and said "after 10 years on the show I now feel the time is right to move on". Producer Bryan Kirkwood added that he was "absolutely gutted by Darren Jeffries' decision to leave but I totally respect that after 10 years of being a character, he wants to move on to different things" and added that he thought Jefferies was a "brilliant" actor. Jefferies later said "It would have been very easy to stay in Hollyoaks for another 10 years, but, at the end of the day, you don't get on in life without taking a few risks" and added that the decision to leave was "difficult" but "it's one that I made three years ago. That made it a lot easier to prepare, both mentally and physically". After leaving in February 2008 Jefferies later confirmed he was to return to work on a storyline which aired later that year.

== Development ==
=== Characterisation ===
Jefferies commented on the character saying he thought he was "he's quite real, believable and down to earth". BBC America described him as "constantly cooking up money-making schemes".

=== Friendship with Max Cunningham ===
When O.B. first appears he begins a friendship with Max Cunningham. They carry on their friendship which becomes strained at times including when Clare Devine comes between them and later when Simon Crosby is wrongly accused of being a paedophile and O.B. stands by him despite Max believing he is a danger to children including Tom. Jefferies commented on the relationship saying they've been a double act for years but things are changing. There was that huge fallout they had when Max falsely accused Simon of being a paedophile and commented that the pair had made up but "there's still something of an undercurrent. Things aren't quite the same. Maybe OB feels it's time to move on. He's become a bit jaded with living in Hollyoaks and living and working with Max. Also Max never seems to listen to OB – he ignored him over Clare and he ignored him about Simon. Consequently, OB finally feels like he wants to branch out a little". Jefferies later commented that "now Max and OB have girlfriends things are bound to change. The girls have made a difference. Max is with Steph now and OB has Summer. Ironically, it was his annoyance with Max over Simon that brought OB closer to Summer because he confided in her". The pair have been described as a "Classic comedy duo" and as being "inseparable from best friend" by E4.

=== Departure ===
Jefferies announced his decision to leave the serial on 15 November 2007. He later said that he "didn't want OB to go out in a big gas explosion or car crash" before adding that "it will be nice to see him go out in that way too. It's a very realistic and natural ending for the character, and also very emotional. I think it will be a very satisfying ending for the viewers". Bryan Kirkwood said he wanted to give the character a "big and iconic an exit storyline that the character deserves" and added that he felt the need to "lessen the impact of such big characters leaving" by having O.B. leave six months before Max. Kirkwood later added that "as much as I loved their exit stories, Max and OB were big losses. You can't replace such original characters who have a special place in the audience's hearts". O.B. meets drama student Summer Shaw and begins a relationship with her. She decides to pursue an acting career in London. On whether O.B. wanted to go with Summer Jefferies said he "wants to go but he's a bit scared. He tells Summer he can't go and she leaves without him". O.B. initially decides to stay in Hollyoaks but leaves to live with Summer and start a new life in London.

=== Return ===
On 27 October 2016, it was announced that Jefferies would reprise his role as O.B. in November 2016. It was announced that he would team up with Cindy Cunningham (Stephanie Waring) and Grace Black (Tamara Wall) after the entire Osborne family vanish without a trace. Speaking about his return, Darren said: "It's an absolute pleasure to bring OB back to Hollyoaks village. If anyone can get to the bottom of where the Osbornes are it's him. I still can't believe it's been over eight years since I left the show, it feels like I've never been away." On 7 December 2016, it was reported that Jefferies had already filmed his final scenes and would depart on screen the following month.

== Storylines ==
O.B. first appears in Hollyoaks when he and Max Cunningham (Matt Littler) are briefly school rivals, but soon became best friends. O.B. and Max hold Jambo Bolton's (Will Mellor) car Beryl for ransom. O.B. loses his virginity with Chloe Bruce. After a brief attempt at a music career with Max he decides to sit his A levels at College. He becomes best friends with Jamie Nash at college. O.B. becomes an alcoholic, drinking regularly at The Dog in the Pond, which causes him to become behind on his college work. O.B., Max, Ben Davies (Marcus Patric), Theo Sankofa (Andrew Somerville), Kristian Hargreaves (Max Brown), and Jamie Nash (Stefan Booth) decide to go on a potholing trip. The trip ends in disaster when an accident occurs killing Theo and O.B.'s best friend Jamie. O.B. feels responsible for Theo's death, after failing to hold on to him in the van. O.B. then starts to appreciate what he has in life, and starts a fitness diet without drinking any alcohol. O.B. has a brief relationship with a girl called Roxy Maguire (Harriet Green) who he meets online. She is later murdered by Toby Mills (Henry Luxemburg). O.B. discovers that Tony Hutchinson is having an affair with Max's stepmother Helen. Tony tries to persuade O.B. not to tell anyone, but O.B. tells Max who is assured the affair has ended by Tony. The affair is finally revealed to Gordon who reconciles with Helen before dying together in a car crash. O.B. moves in with Max and begins helping look after Tom, Max's half brother.

O.B. and Mel Burton begin a brief relationship but end it because of her drinking problems. Max and O.B. later become owners of The Loft. They hire entertainer Clare Devine for the club. Max and Clare begin a relationship and O.B. becomes suspicious of Clare leading to Max and O.B. having a fight. O.B. moves out of Max's flat because of Clare turning Max against O.B.. Clare frames O.B. for drug possession on her wedding day to Max. O.B. stops the wedding after being released revealing Clare planned to leave after marrying Max and had bought a plane ticket. Clare lies that she had meant to order two, as a surprise honeymoon. Max punches O.B. and cuts his contact with Tom off.

Mel, who also believes O.B., gets evidence of Clare cheating on Max with Warren from CCTV footage in Evissa. After O.B. and Mel threaten Clare and are about to leave the Dog to speak to Max, the pub was destroyed by Sam Owen. O.B. discovers Mel's body and when he tries to help Sophie through the flames he is knocked out with a brick by Sam. The explosion leaves O.B. hospitalised and kills Mel, Sophie and three others. Whilst in hospital O.B. is threatened by Clare before she steals the evidence of her relationship with Warren. O.B. briefly dates Carmel McQueen but O.B. ends the relationship after he realises he isn't over Mel. Max has a heart attack and when O.B. goes to see him at hospital he is told to leave. Clare stops anyone visiting Max at Christmas so O.B. visits him when she isn't home. Clare returns before O.B. can take Max to hospital after she'd been tampering with his medication. Clare leaves for the countryside, so she could slowly kill him by tampering with his medication again. Clare tells Max that Tom has fallen into an icy lake, so Max dives in. O.B. arrives before Max drowns and punches Clare before diving in to save Max. O.B. and Max rekindle their friendship. In summer 2007 Max and O.B. open MOBS. O.B. shoves Clare against a wall after and threatens to kill her after she insults Mel and Sophie. O.B. becomes a suspect in the attempted murder of Clare after she is pushed off a balcony. He is questioned by the police, but released due to insufficient evidence. On 29 June 2007, O.B. attempts to kill Clare in hospital but is interrupted by a police officer. In September, the culprit is revealed to be Justin Burton, who had overheard Clare's remarks about his sisters.

Clare is thought to have died at a quarry and convinces Max to pursue his interest in Steph Dean. After the two begin a relationship O.B. feels left out. He begins a friendship with Simon Crosby, a lifeguard at a local pool. Gilly Roach witnesses a young boy leaving Simon's cubicle in tears, and becomes convinced Simon is a paedophile. He tells O.B. and Max, but O.B. strongly disagrees. Gilly becomes distressed when he witnesses Simon taking several boys out for ice cream. Gilly breaks into Simon's house and finds pictures of boys in their swimming trunks. O.B., Max, and Gilly go to Simon's house the next day and find a child's bedroom. Max is convinced Simon is a danger to children so punches O.B. as Simon is looking after Tom. Max later beats up Simon and is arrested for assault. O.B. continues to believe that Simon is innocent, and is angry over Max's actions. He is upset when Max tells O.B. he isn't as emotionally involved as Max because he was not Tom's brother. Simon's ex-wife Gemma arrives for a visit and tells them she and Simon had a son who had drowned, that the bedroom was their son's room and that the photos would have been presents for the parents of each child after they graduated from his swimming class. Gilly and Jake Dean form a lynch mob and begin assaulting Simon's house with bricks and bottles. When O.B., Gemma and Max get inside, they see him unconscious on the floor, holding his son's photo in his hand. Simon survives the overdose, but tells O.B. that he can't stay in the village. After Max's disbelief of O.B. he moves into Tony's flat. Tom asks him to forgive Max which he did.

O.B. begins a relationship with Summer Shaw, a performing arts student. Summer decides to leave for London. O.B. decides that he doesn't want to leave Max and Tom behind. O.B. decides to leave with Summer after realising his feelings for her. O.B. then leaves the village. Summer and O.B. arrive in London where she gets the part of Maria in The Sound of Music and soon after return to Hollyoaks. Summer leaves for London but O.B. has doubts about moving to London so remains. Max persuades O.B. to go down to London and tell Summer his true feelings. He is accompanied by Max, Tom and Steph. O.B. then begins a new life with Summer in London. O.B. then bids farewell to Max and Tom.

O.B. returns for Max and Steph's wedding. O.B. and Summer plan to move to New York and Max agrees to join him after the wedding is cancelled. Steph later convinces him to marry her. On the morning of the wedding, Max starts to experience chest pains and is rushed to hospital. Steph and Max finally marry. Max gives O.B. a watch inscribed with the words Best Man, Best Mate. Tom is playing in the road and doesn't see Niall Rafferty's car hurtling towards him. Max gets him to safety, but was mortally wounded in the process. O.B. held Max as he died. He writes a eulogy for Max's funeral, but he and Tom couldn't bear to attend. Tom decides to stay with Steph instead of leaving with O.B. who plans to return to London. Steph, Tom, Mandy, and Cindy gather in the street to say goodbye. O.B. looks to the Drive'n'Buy, where he briefly sees Max, nodding a silent farewell. Jack Osborne and Tom visit him while he is staying in London in June 2010. O.B. returns to the village in November 2016 when he discovers that Tom has gone missing along with the rest of the Osbornes.

== Reception ==
At the 2007 British Soap Awards Jefferies was nominated for "Best on-screen partnership" along with Littler, O.B. punching Clare and saving Max from the lake was nominated for "Spectacular scene of the year" and O.B.'s involvement in Clare attempting to kill Max was nominated for "Best storyline". At the Digital Spy Soap Awards 2008 O.B. saving Max from the lake was nominated for "Best single episode" and he and Litter were nominated for "Best on-screen partnership". The character was selected as one of the "top 100 British soap characters" by industry experts for a poll to be run by What's on TV, with readers able to vote for their favourite character to discover "Who is Soap's greatest Legend?" Digital Spy described him as a "much-loved iconic character". Virgin Media profiled O.B' and Max's double act, stating: "This pair have fallen out more times than you can shake a stick at. Both mischievous, they are a bit of a double act but have grown more serious in recent times." Merle Brown of the Daily Record claimed that O.B. was "not interesting".
