= Cassie Powney =

English actress

- Born: 22 May 1983 (age 42); Eastbourne, East Sussex, England
- Occupation: Actress
- Years active: 1994–present
- Children: 2
- Relatives: Connie Powney (sister)

Cassie Powney (born 22 May 1983) is an English actress, known for playing Mel Burton on the Channel 4 soap opera Hollyoaks.

== Career ==
She played the role of Mel Burton in the soap opera Hollyoaks alongside her twin sister Connie, who played the role of Sophie Burton. She has been interested in acting since childhood and played multiple twin roles with Connie, including in the 2003 film What a Girl Wants. Since at least 2021, she has been a beauty editor for the UK edition of Cosmopolitan.

== Filmography ==
Year	Title	Role	Notes
2002	Dalziel and Pascoe	Twin 1	2 episodes
2003	What A Girl Wants	Peach Orwood	
2003–2006	Hollyoaks	Mel Burton	
2006	Hollyoaks: Back from the Dead	Mel Burton	
2013	Crackanory	Zoe One	1 episode
