= Luti Fagbenle =

British actor, film producer and businessman

- Born: Westminster, London, England
- Occupations: Actor, film producer, businessman
- Known for: Ali Taylor in Hollyoaks
- Relatives: O. T. Fagbenle, Temi Fagbenle, Daps

Oladoke Lutiseku Mobolaji Fagbenle, better known as Luti Fagbenle is a British actor, film producer and businessman.

== Career ==
In 2006, Luti founded the production company Luti Media. The company has produced hundreds of music videos, commercials, and films. Their work has been honoured with nominations and awards from the MTV VMAs, BAFTA, the MOBO Awards, Virgin Media Shorts, the UKMVAs, and others.

Fagbenle's debut film was the 2006 Channel 4 Documentary Nike Midnight Madness narrated by Trevor Nelson.

In 2013, Luti's video for One Direction's "Best Song Ever" broke the record on Vevo for views in 24 hours. Vevo announced that the music video delivered 12.3 million views in the 24 hours following its premiere. This beats out the previous record holder, Miley Cyrus's "We Can't Stop," which hit 10.7 million views. The video went on to win Best Video at the 2014 Brit Awards.

Screen Nation honoured Luti with the Digital Vanguard Award for trailblazing contribution to the British and international online digital media industry at the 2013 Digital-iS Media awards at Google's headquarters.

In 2014, The Luti Media-produced video for Iggy Azalea "Fancy" helped the single reach number one on the Billboard Hot 100, becoming both Azalea's and Charli XCX's first number-one on that chart, holding the spot for seven consecutive weeks. The video was nominated for Best Video at the 2014 MTV Video Music Awards and the 2014 MTV Europe Music Awards.

In 2018, with Luti Media's Jamaican production expertise, The Carters created a film (OTR 2) that explores the nature of love, life, sacrifice, and changes through the story of Jay-Z and Beyonce.

== Personal life ==
Son of Nigerian journalist Tunde Fagbenle and English mother Ally Bedford, Luti is the younger brother of actor O. T. Fagbenle and the older brother of video music director and producer Oladapo Fagbenle; his sister is basketball player Temi Fagbenle.

== Television ==
In 2019, Luti Fagbenle began producing his first scripted television series, Maxxx, for Channel 4 and Hulu, written, directed, and starred in by Luti's brother OT Fagbenle. Maxxx is a sitcom that centered around former famous boy band star turned drug-shamed tabloid laughing stock Maxxx. The series was nominated for an RTS Award and an Edinburgh TV award.

In August 2021, Luti Media produced Highlife for Channel 4. Highlife is a reality/documentary-style show, following a group of young and ambitious British West Africans in their everyday life. Described as "the first Black British premium reality series," Highlife was voted best new TV show of 2021 by Cosmopolitan magazine.

== Music videography ==
Artist(s)	Song Title	Label	Director	Production company
Popcaan	"Firm and Strong"	Mixpak Records	Nabil Elderkin	Luti Media
Justin Bieber	"Yummy"	Def Jam	Parris Goebel	Luti Media
Zayn	"PILLOWTALK"	RCA	Bouha Kazmi	Luti Media
Zayn	"Satisfaction"	RCA	Bouha Kazmi	Luti Media
One Direction	"Best Song Ever"	Syco Music	Ben Winston	Luti Media / Fullwell 73
Nicki Minaj	"Freedom"	Cash Money Records	Colin Tilley	Luti Media
Cheryl Cole	"Under The Sun"	Polydor Records	Anthony Mandler	Black Hand Cinema / Luti Media
Kanye West & Jay-Z	"Niggas in Paris" (Paris shoot)	Roc-A-Fella Records	Kanye West	Luti Media
Iggy Azalea feat. Charli XCX	"Fancy"	Virgin EMI	Director X	Luti Media / DNA
Rita Ora	"Poison"	Roc Nation Columbia Atlantic	Director X	Cameron Duddy
Charles Hamilton feat. Rita Ora	"New York Raining"	Interscope Records Republic Records	Max and Dania	Luti Media / DNA
Iggy Azalea feat. Rita Ora	"Black Widow"	Virgin EMI	Director X	Luti Media / DNA
Little Mix	"Black Magic"	Syco Music	Director X	Luti Media
Ed Sheeran, Labrinth, Tinchy Stryder, Rizzle Kicks, Chipmunk, Mz Bratt, Ms Dynamite, Tulisa Contostavlos, Wretch 32, Dot Rotten, and Gary Barlow	"Teardrop"	Future Records	Vertex & Ben	Luti Media
Olly Murs	"Dance With Me Tonight"	Epic Records	Marcus Lundin	Luti Media
JLS	"Take A Chance on Me"	Epic Records	Parris Stewart	Riveting Entertainment
Alexandra Burke feat. Pitbull	"All Night Long"	Syco	Rage	Luti Media
N-Dubz	"I Need You"	Universal Music	Rage	Luti Media
N-Dubz feat. Mr. Hudson	"Playing With Fire"	Universal Music	Rage	Luti Media
Lemar	"The Way Love Goes"	Sony Music	Rage	Luti Media
Zayn	"Like I Would"	RCA Records	Director X	Luti Media
