= Darren Jeffries =

British actor

- Born: 2 March 1982 (age 43); Wrexham, Wales
- Occupations: Actor; writer; presenter
- Years active: 1997–present

Darren Jon-Jeffries (born 2 March 1982) is an English actor, writer and presenter best known for his portrayal of Sam "O.B." O'Brien in Channel 4 soap-opera Hollyoaks. He is also known for presenting Freshly Squeezed and Red Bull Rivals on Channel 4, as well as Text Santa for ITV2.

== Early life ==
Jeffries was born in Wrexham, Wales to Glynis Jeffries (née Jones), a teacher of sign language, and Wayne Jeffries, a professional carpenter.

As a senior, he attended Padgate Community High School in Warrington, (now known as Padgate Academy), whose notable former pupils also include Chris Evans and Kerry Katona. Jeffries also joined Padgate High sixth Form College and studied business, English literature, English language and drama.

== Career ==
At fourteen whilst attending Padgate High, he joined a Warrington-based acting course, culminating in a small performance at Warrington's Parr Hall where he was spotted by a North-West based acting agency. This led to an audition for the role of Sam "O.B." O'Brien in Channel 4 soap-opera Hollyoaks in 1997, which he subsequently obtained. He was a prominent cast member in the show until 2007, when he announced he would be leaving the series in order to pursue other projects.

Soon afterwards in 2008 he carved a successful presenting career alongside Hollyoaks co-star Matt Littler beginning with a stint on Channel 4's V Festival coverage, followed by The Versus Chart on T4 throughout 2008 and 2009. In 2009 Jeffries and Littler were also the faces of The RAF's 'Least 9 till 5' media campaign, and presented their own radio show on the Lancashire radio station Rock FM.

In 2010, Jeffries hosted T4's Red Bull Rivals, where he and Matt Littler visited France, South Africa, Sweden and Greece whilst taking part in numerous Red Bull sponsored sports. From 2011 to 2012 he was the presenter of Channel 4's flagship music show Freshly Squeezed, alongside Matt Littler, Jameela Jamil and Matt Edmondson.

Throughout 2013 he hosted The British Soap Awards spin-off show on ITV2 alongside Matt Littler, Zoe Hardman and Joe Swash, presented a Text Santa spin-off show for ITV, and throughout 2014, guest presented The Gadget Show numerous times for Channel 5.

In 2014 Jeffries returned to performing, and appeared numerous times on stage and television in various productions, whilst also studying at The Manchester School Of Acting. In 2016, Jefferies reprised his role as OB in Hollyoaks. In February 2023, he portrayed Pete Farnsworth in an episode of the BBC soap opera Doctors.

== Filmography ==
Year	Title	Role
1997–2008, 2016–2017	Hollyoaks	Sam "O.B." O'Brien
2000	Hollyoaks: Breaking Boundaries	Sam "O.B." O'Brien
2014	Cardboard Andy	Andy
2022	Brassic	Minimart owner
2023	Doctors	Pete Farnsworth

== Awards ==
At The 2008 British Soap Awards, Darren Jeffries and Matt Littler won The Best On-Screen Partnership Award.
