= List of fictional polyamorous characters =

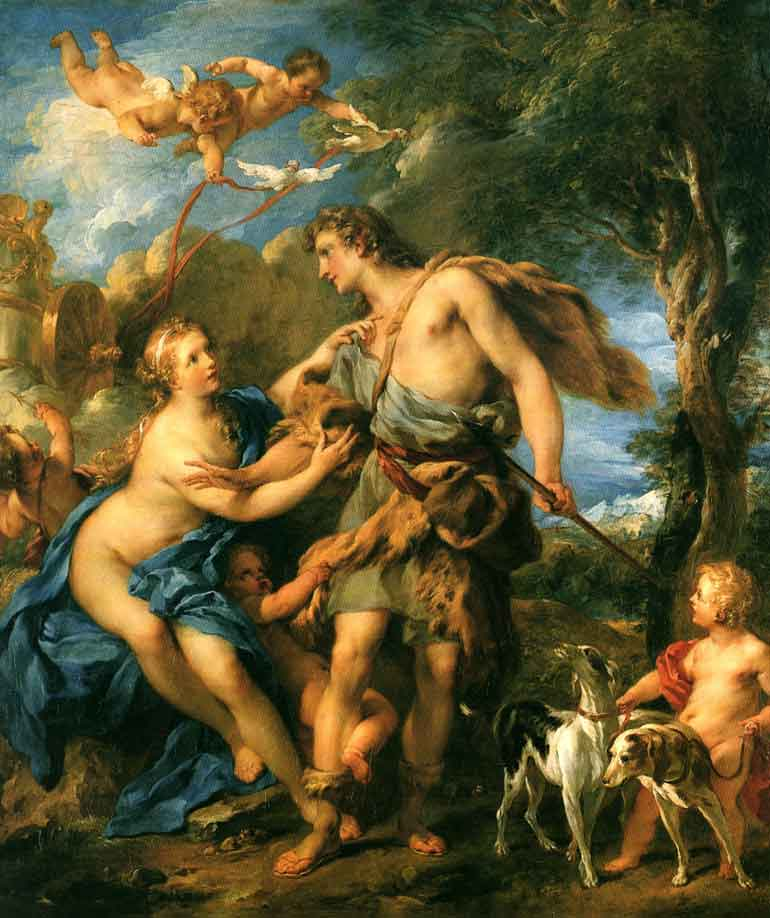
In Greek mythology, Adonis (center) was in a relationship with both Persephone and Aphrodite (left), who agreed to share his love. In some versions he was also in relationships with Dionysus, Apollo and Heracles.

This is a list of polyamorous characters in fiction, including those in animation and graphic art works. It is organized alphabetically by last name of the main character involved in the polyamorous relationship, or first name if there is no last name known.

== Animation and anime ==
Characters	Title	Duration	Notes	Country
Rentarō Aijō	The 100 Girlfriends Who Really, Really, Really, Really, Really Love You	2023–present	Rentarō Aijō has confessed to (and been rejected by) 100 girls in his lifetime. On the last day of middle school, he visits a shrine and the God of Love appears and tells Rentarō that the reason for his non-existent love life is because everyone is only supposed to have one soulmate in their life, but due to an error on the God of Love's part, Rentarō is destined to have 100. Rentarō meets the wealthy Hakari Hanazono and tsundere Karane Inda, and he decides to date both of them at the same time, with their blessing, as any of the soulmates he does not date will die in "horrible accidents". Rentarō loves each of his girlfriends as individuals and has no "interest in ranking or comparing them."	Japan
Renako Amaori	There's No Freaking Way I'll be Your Lover! Unless...	2025–2026	The protagonist and narrator of the series. Renako is a first-year high school student who seeks to reform herself as an extrovert after having been a socially anxious recluse in middle school, which she is embarrassed about. Renako is initially reluctant to engage in any romantic relationships, feeling that staying friends would be preferable. However, she later admits her homosexuality and begins dating both Mai and Ajisai in a consensual non-monogamous relationship.	Japan
Coral	Young Justice	2010–2013	Married to La'gaan and Rodunn.	United States
Coral	Young Justice	2018–2022	Married to La'gaan and Rodunn.	United States
Nano Eiai	The 100 Girlfriends Who Really, Really, Really, Really, Really Love You	2023–present	Rentarō's fourth girlfriend and classmate. Nano is stoic to the point of emotionlessness and is afraid of heights. She is intelligent and highly optimized in her daily life, removing any sort of unnecessary movements and actions to achieve utter efficiency. Nano initially has trouble concentrating when she first falls in love with Rentarō, throwing her lifestyle into chaos. This changes after going on a date with him where she accepts her feelings, and stops him from burning the photos they took on it.	Japan
Fluorite	Steven Universe	2013–2019	Fluorite (voiced by Kathy Fisher) is an unaligned fusion (Note: Fusion, in Steven Universe, occurs when two or more beings (usually Gems) reach a state of emotional equalibrium between each other, with these fusions as a manifestation of the friendship or relationship between two or more individuals.) of six unknown Gems, introduced in the episode "Off Colors", and was confirmed as polyamorous by series creator Rebecca Sugar.	United States
Hakari Hanazono	The 100 Girlfriends Who Really, Really, Really, Really, Really Love You	2023–present	One of Rentarō's first two girlfriends, along with Karane Inda. In addition to loving Rentarō, she is somewhat attracted to Karane. In the eighth episode, she and Karane have an "extended makeout session" while both are "kiss zombies."	Japan
Hahari Hanazono	The 100 Girlfriends Who Really, Really, Really, Really, Really Love You	2023–present	Rentarō's sixth girlfriend and Hakari's mother. Hahari initially disapproved of Hakari's relationship with Rentarō, but changed her mind when she fell in love with Rentarō herself. She later bought his school and became the new chairwoman to stay close to him. She adores cute things, is affectionate to Rentarō and his girlfriends (as a mother figure), and shares some of her daughter's perverted tendencies.	Japan
Kurumi Haraga	The 100 Girlfriends Who Really, Really, Really, Really, Really Love You	2023–present	Rentarō's seventh girlfriend. Kurumi is a third-year middle-schooler with a very high metabolism, which causes her to get hungry very easily. She constantly wears headphones and has her hood up in order to block out as much food-related talk as possible due to her cravings when hearing food-like words.	Japan
Hollyhock's fathers	BoJack Horseman	2014–2020	Hollyhock, a female teenage horse and Bojack's sister, has eight adoptive fathers (Dashawn Manheim, Steve Mannheim, Jose Guerrero, Cupe Robinson III, Otto Zilberschlag, Arturo "Ice Man" Fonzerelli, Gregory Hsung, and Quackers McQuack) in a polyamorous gay relationship.	United States
Karane Inda	The 100 Girlfriends Who Really, Really, Really, Really, Really Love You	2023–present	One of Rentarō's first two girlfriends, along with Hakari Hanazono. While she initially disliked the idea of Rentarō having multiple girlfriends, she soon became accepting of them. In addition to loving Rentarō, she is somewhat attracted to Hakari. She has an extended, and mutually romantic, kiss with Hakari in the eighth episode.	Japan
Tatewaki Kuno	Ranma ½	1989	Tatewaki is in love with both Akane and the "Pigtail Girl" (Ranma's female form) and proposes to date both, but they do not return his feelings.	Japan
La'gaan	Young Justice	2010–2013	Married to Coral and Rodunn, with all of them welcoming their first child.	United States
La'gaan	Young Justice	2018–2022	Married to Coral and Rodunn, with all of them welcoming their first child.	United States
Nagisa Minase	Girlfriend, Girlfriend	2021	In a relationship with Naoya Mukai and Nagisa Minase.	Japan
Touya Mochizuki	In Another World with My Smartphone	2017–2023	In the world of this series, polygamy is legal, since the series world isn't tied to "conventional morality." Toya begins with a relationship with a "mess of great women," beginning with Elze Silhoueska, Linze Silhoueska, Yae Kokonoe, and Yumina Ernea Belfast, by the end of season one, with everyone accepting this arrangement as his fiancées. According to Babylon's vision, Touya would have nine wives in total, later including Sushie Ernea Ortlinde, Leen, Lucia Leah Regulus, Hildegard Minas Lestia, and Sakura later on in the series, with implications that Renne will be his tenth fiancée in the future.	Japan
Naoya Mukai	Girlfriend, Girlfriend	2021	Naoya Mukai had recently begun a relationship with his childhood friend Saki Saki when Nagisa Minase, his classmate, decides to confess her feelings to him as well. After some initial hesitation, he accepts her request to be her boyfriend as well. Naoya decides that he will date both Saki and Nagisa at the same time.	Japan
Mai Oduka	There's No Freaking Way I'll be Your Lover! Unless...	2025–2026	A teenage supermodel who is the daughter of Renée Oduka, a prominent fashion designer. As Renako's classmate, Mai is a highly popular student, known by the student body as the school's "super darling". She exudes a confident persona, but secretly is overwhelmed by her popularity and her mother's lofty expectations. Mai falls in love with Renako after the latter encourages her to take breaks from maintaining her persona. Outside of school and her modeling career, she is also skilled in playing the guitar and in calligraphy. She enters a consensual non-monogamous relationship with Ajisai Sena and Renako in episode 17.	Japan
Rodunn	Young Justice	2010–2013	Married to La'gaan and Coral.	United States
Rodunn	Young Justice	2018–2022	Married to La'gaan and Coral.	United States
Saki Saki	Girlfriend, Girlfriend	2021	In a relationship with Naoya Mukai and Nagisa Minase.	Japan
Ajisai Sena	There's No Freaking Way I'll be Your Lover! Unless...	2025–2026	Renako's friend and classmate. Ajisai has two younger brothers who she is often responsible for taking care of while her parents are working, which she finds stressful. She harbors strong affections for Renako, and Renako, in turn, is deeply infatuated with Ajisai, often referring to her as an "angel" in her internal monologue. She enters a consensual non-monogamous relationship with Mai Oduka and Renako in episode 17.	Japan
Tree Trunks	Adventure Time	2013–2018	She has a husband, Mr. Pig, but has an alien husband, who she has four children with.	United States
Old Man Waterfall	Futurama	1999–2013	Old Man Waterfall, who is Zoidberg's defense attorney until killed by a giant crab warship, has seven wives and one husband as shown in the episode "A Taste of Freedom", arguing this before the Supreme Court, which holds polygamy as legal.	United States
Kusuri Yakuzen	The 100 Girlfriends Who Really, Really, Really, Really, Really Love You	2023–present	Rentarō's fifth girlfriend and third-year high school student. Kusuri is the president of the Chemistry club at Rentarō's high school and specialises in creating drugs that have strange effects when consumed. While she is technically 18 years old, she spends much of her time in an eight-year-old's body and she has a neutralization drug that can revert most of her drug's effects. This includes the failed immortal drug, which can only be temporarily negated.	Japan
Shizuka Yoshimoto	The 100 Girlfriends Who Really, Really, Really, Really, Really Love You	2023–present	The third girlfriend of Rentarō and one of his classmates. She is shy to the point of muteness and was constantly bullied by her fellow students and abused by her mother before meeting Rentarō. She is a bookworm who can initially only communicate through passages from her favorite book by pointing at them, but Rentarō develops a speaking app for her so she can freely communicate by digitally reciting the lines she touches, as well as a word bank.	Japan

== Comics ==
Characters	Title	Duration	Authors	Notes	Country
Deimos	Stupidly Beautiful	2017–2019	Local Lil Kiddo	In a polyamorous relationship with Kalmin and Mira.	United States
Dendrobium "Dendro"	Muted	2019–2022	Miranda Mundt	Summoned to Earth by Camille Severin with both kissing in episode 79 of the comic's second season. Confirmed by the comic's author as in a polyamorous relationship with Lilinyra 'Nyra' Dupre and Severin.	United States
Lilinyra 'Nyra' Dupre	Muted	2019–2022	Miranda Mundt	The girlfriend of Camille Severin. Confirmed by the comic's author as in a polyamorous relationship with Dendrobium "Dendro" and Severin, and saying that Severin is not "cheating" on Dupre with Dendro.	United States
Every major character	Open Earth	2018	Sarah Mirk	The comic is set in the future and monogamous relationships are seen as outdated to all the young people on board the space station, all of whom are polyamorous. Author Sarah Mirk said that she wanted to write a story where "open relationships can be really positive and wonderful" and said that it's realistic to believe that people would "explore multiple relationships". She also said she wanted to write a story where it was "totally normal to be queer and genderqueer."	United States
Every major character	Open Earth	2018	Eva Cabrera	The comic is set in the future and monogamous relationships are seen as outdated to all the young people on board the space station, all of whom are polyamorous. Author Sarah Mirk said that she wanted to write a story where "open relationships can be really positive and wonderful" and said that it's realistic to believe that people would "explore multiple relationships". She also said she wanted to write a story where it was "totally normal to be queer and genderqueer."	United States
Every major character	Open Earth	2018	Claudia Aguirre	The comic is set in the future and monogamous relationships are seen as outdated to all the young people on board the space station, all of whom are polyamorous. Author Sarah Mirk said that she wanted to write a story where "open relationships can be really positive and wonderful" and said that it's realistic to believe that people would "explore multiple relationships". She also said she wanted to write a story where it was "totally normal to be queer and genderqueer."	United States
Keita Imaizumi	Imaizumi Brings All the Gals to His House	2019–present	Gorō Nori	Originally a sexual relationship with Reina, Ruri, and Yukina, it developed into a romantic relationship with Reina's sister, Lisa, also being a part of the relationship.	Japan
Kalmin	Stupidly Beautiful	2017–2019	Local Lil Kiddo	This webcomic explores gender roles and sexuality in a polyamorous relationship, with the college-age characters, Kalmin, Mira, and Deimos, and their "sexual exploration" described as real, especially in "emotionally resonant" and "poetic" episodes.	United States
Mira	Stupidly Beautiful	2017–2019	Local Lil Kiddo	In a polyamorous relationship with Kalmin and Deimos.	United States
Multiple characters	Kimchi Cuddles	2013–present	Tikva Wolf	In this long-running series, polyamorous people are portrayed like other characters, "only with more partners to steal their blankets."	United States
Multiple characters	Snug Orbit	2016–present	Emrys Seren	This autobiographical webcomic has "polyamorous queerplatonic relationship" with some episodes discussing the aromantic and asexual spectrum and "healthy relationships." Specifically, Emrys is bigender, asexual aromantic, while Calliope is pansexual.	United States
Quanxi	Chainsaw Man	2018–present	Tatsuki Fujimoto	Quanxi is a seemingly-immortal Devil Hunter and assassin from China widely regarded as one of the physically strongest people on the planet. She is a lesbian and in a sexual relationship with four female "Fiends" (Devils possessing human bodies) named Cosmo, Pingtsi, Long, and Tsugihagi.	Japan
Camille Severin	Muted	2019–2022	Miranda Mundt	The comic is set in New Orleans where people possess different magical abilities, and at age 21, Camille Severin is told to summon a demon, but it fails. Camille later does summon a demon named Dendrobium "Dendro" and they grow closer over time. In episode 79 of the comic's second season, they kiss and express their love for one another. She also has a girlfriend named Lilinyra 'Nyra' Dupre. When some raised the question of whether Camille is "cheating" on Dendro with Dupre, the comic's author, Miranda Mundt, confirmed that Camille, Nyra, and Dendro are in a polyamorous relationship, and stated that Camille is not cheating on Nyra.	United States
Koriand'r (Starfire)	Teen Titans	1980–present	Marv Wolfman	Deriving from being raised on the culture of her homeworld Tamaran, where it is acceptable to have open marriage, Starfire's sex-positivism and free-thinking habits such as a fondness for practicing nudism, openness to polygamous relationships and acceptance of "open sex" and pansexual "free-love" with persons regardless of terrestrial species, race or gender, usually lead her into conflict with Earth's more reserved culture and customs. For Starfire, polyamory is a personal and cultural preference.	United States
Koriand'r (Starfire)	Teen Titans	1980–present	George Perez		United States
Tengen Uzui	Demon Slayer: Kimetsu no Yaiba	2016–2020	Koyoharu Gotouge	Tengen Uzui is a Demon Slayer and the Sound Hashira, the Hashira being the strongest of the Demon Slayer Corps, he is married to three kunoichi named Suma, Makio and Hinatsuru. Tengen was born into a shinobi clan that practiced polyamory, however wives were only considered useful for giving birth to more children and gathering intel if their life depended on it. Tengen did not like this (as well as other reasons) and left the clan with his wives, valuing their lives and happiness over tradition.	Japan

== Films ==
Characters	Actors	Title	Year	Notes	Country
Ben	Travis Delgado	2 in the Bush: A Love Story	2018	In a romantic relationship with Emily and Nikki in this romantic comedy.	United States
Bertie	Idella Johnson	Ma Belle, My Beauty	2021	In a romantic relationship with Lane and Fred.	United States
Olive Byrne	Bella Heathcote	Professor Marston and the Wonder Women	2017	In a romantic relationship with William Moulton Marston and Elizabeth Holloway Marston.	United States
Thomas B. 'Tom' Chambers	Fredric March	Design for Living	1933	A film which follows three Americans who meet in a Paris train, with Thomas B. 'Tom' Chambers and George Curtis drawn to Gilda Farrell, who is also attracted to them. She originally dates each one secretly, but they end up dating together, with the film following this arrangement between these three young Americans.	United States
George Curtis	Gary Cooper	Design for Living	1933	A man attracted to Gilda Farrell, who, originally, secretly dates him. He later begins dating her and Thomas B. 'Tom' Chambers.	United States
Emily	Sarah Lin Mitchell	2 in the Bush: A Love Story	2018	In a romantic relationship with Ben and Nikki in this romantic comedy.	United States
Gilda Farrell	Miriam Hopkins	Design for Living	1933	She is attracted to Thomas B. 'Tom' Chambers and George Curtis. Originally, she dates each one secretly, but later she openly dates both of them.	United States
Fred	Lucien Guignard	Ma Belle, My Beauty	2021	In a romantic relationship with Lane and Bertie.	United States
Lane	Hannah Pepper	Ma Belle, My Beauty	2021	This film follows the love story of Lane, Berte, and Fred in the south of France, and debuted at the 2021 Sundance Film Festival.	United States
Laurent	Alain Chabat	French Twist (Gazon maudit)	1995	A philandering husband who forms a bi and poly triad with a butch lesbian from France (Marijo) and bisexual woman from Spain (Loli), with the triad also including three children and three parents.	France
Loli	Victoria Abril	French Twist (Gazon maudit)	1995	A bisexual woman from Spain who forms a bi and poly triad with a philandering husband (Laurent) and a butch lesbian from France (Marijo).	France
Marijo	Josiane Balasko	French Twist (Gazon maudit)	1995	A butch lesbian from France who forms a bi and poly triad with a philandering husband (Laurent) and a bisexual woman from Spain (Loli).	France
Elizabeth Holloway Marston	Rebecca Hall	Professor Marston and the Wonder Women	2017	In a romantic relationship with William Moulton Marston and Olive Byrne.	United States
William Moulton Marston	Luke Evans	Professor Marston and the Wonder Women	2017	This film is about a polyamorous love between a professor, his wife, and their student, Olive, as they share a "workplace, a bed, a home and eventually a family" into the foreseeable future from the 1920s, treating their relationship like "a typical movie coupling."	United States
Nikki	Caito Aase	2 in the Bush: A Love Story	2018	In a romantic relationship with Emily and Ben in this romantic comedy.	United States
Colleen O'Hallahan	Brittany Murphy	Futurama: The Beast with a Billion Backs	2008	Colleen has five boyfriends: Fry, Chu, Ndulu, Schlomo and Bolt Rolands. After Yivo the planet-sized alien marries and breaks up with all people of the universe at once, she remains in a relationship only with Yivo.	United States
Yivo	David Cross	Futurama: The Beast with a Billion Backs	2008	Yivo is a planet-sized alien with no determinable gender, dating, then marrying, all people of the universe at once. Later, they break up. Afterwards, Yivo remains in a relationship with Colleen.	United States

== Literature ==
Characters	Work	Year	Author	Notes
Rand al'Thor	The Wheel of Time	1990–2013	Robert Jordan	In a polycule with Min, Aviendha and Elayne. He is half Aiel, a culture which commonly practices polyamory, but was not raised as such.
Rand al'Thor	The Wheel of Time	1990–2013	Brandon Sanderson	In a polycule with Min, Aviendha and Elayne. He is half Aiel, a culture which commonly practices polyamory, but was not raised as such.
Amys	The Wheel of Time	1990–2013	Robert Jordan	Wife of Rhuarc and in a polycule with Lian, who is her sister-wife. Part of the Aiel culture, which commonly practice polyamory.
Amys	The Wheel of Time	1990–2013	Brandon Sanderson	Wife of Rhuarc and in a polycule with Lian, who is her sister-wife. Part of the Aiel culture, which commonly practice polyamory.
Aviendha	The Wheel of Time	1990–2013	Robert Jordan	In a polycule with Min, Rand and Elayne. Part of the Aiel culture, which commonly practice polyamory.
Aviendha	The Wheel of Time	1990–2013	Brandon Sanderson	In a polycule with Min, Rand and Elayne. Part of the Aiel culture, which commonly practice polyamory.
Bael	The Wheel of Time	1990–2013	Robert Jordan	Wife of Melaine and Dorindha. Part of the Aiel culture, which commonly practice polyamory.
Bael	The Wheel of Time	1990–2013	Brandon Sanderson	Wife of Melaine and Dorindha. Part of the Aiel culture, which commonly practice polyamory.
Captain of ship	Ascension	2013	Jacqueline Koyanagi	Alana, a Black lesbian mechanic who works on spaceships, stows away on a ship and is romantically attracted to the ship's polyamorous captain.
Cristina	The Dark Artifices	2016	Cassandra Clare	Grows closer to Mark, who is in a relationship with Kieran, and through the series, Kieran and Cristina also start liking each other while also liking Mark. Decides to be together with Mark and Kieran in Queen of Air and Darkness.
Dorindha	The Wheel of Time	1990–2013	Robert Jordan	Wife of Bael and Melaine. Part of the Aiel culture, which commonly practice polyamory.
Dorindha	The Wheel of Time	1990–2013	Brandon Sanderson	Wife of Bael and Melaine. Part of the Aiel culture, which commonly practice polyamory.
Em	Don’t Bang the Barista & Go Deep	2014	Leigh Matthews	Em, the best friend of the protagonist, is a bisexual woman dating a man in the first book, but by the second book she has "happily settled into a poly triad", wondering how she will get married.
Em	Don’t Bang the Barista & Go Deep	2016	Leigh Matthews	Em, the best friend of the protagonist, is a bisexual woman dating a man in the first book, but by the second book she has "happily settled into a poly triad", wondering how she will get married.
Min Farshaw	The Wheel of Time	1990–2013	Robert Jordan	In a polycule with Rand, Aviendha and Elayne.
Min Farshaw	The Wheel of Time	1990–2013	Brandon Sanderson	In a polycule with Rand, Aviendha and Elayne.
Ihvon	The Wheel of Time	1990–2013	Robert Jordan	His relationship with Alanna and Owein/Maksim was hinted at in the original text, but only fully explored in the 2021 TV adaptation.
Ihvon	The Wheel of Time	1990–2013	Brandon Sanderson	His relationship with Alanna and Owein/Maksim was hinted at in the original text, but only fully explored in the 2021 TV adaptation.
Kieran	The Dark Artifices	2016	Cassandra Clare	At the beginning of the series, is together with Mark, and later begins liking Cristina. Decides to be together with Mark and Cristina in Queen of Air and Darkness.
Lian	The Wheel of Time	1990–2013	Robert Jordan	Sister wife of Amys and in a polycule with Rhuarc, who is Amys' husband. Part of the Aiel culture, which commonly practice polyamory.
Lian	The Wheel of Time	1990–2013	Brandon Sanderson	Sister wife of Amys and in a polycule with Rhuarc, who is Amys' husband. Part of the Aiel culture, which commonly practice polyamory.
Mark	The Dark Artifices	2016	Cassandra Clare	At the beginning of the series, Mark and Kieran are together and dating but after Mark rejoins his family for the investigation, he meets Cristina. He grows closer to her and she discovers his relationship with Kieran. However, through the series, Kieran and Cristina also start liking each other while also liking Mark. They decide to all be together during Queen of Air and Darkness.
Melaine	The Wheel of Time	1990–2013	Robert Jordan	Wife of Bael and Dorindha. Part of the Aiel culture, which commonly practice polyamory.
Melaine	The Wheel of Time	1990–2013	Brandon Sanderson	Wife of Bael and Dorindha. Part of the Aiel culture, which commonly practice polyamory.
Mom of Pina	Love You Two	2009	Maria Pallotta-Chiarolli	Pina's mom, who is free-spirited, is polyamorous and bisexual, leading Pina on a journey to explore the "complex spectrum of sex and love" in humanity itself.
Alanna Mosvani	The Wheel of Time	1990–2013	Robert Jordan	Alanna's relationship with Ihvon and Owein/Maksim was hinted at in the original text, but only fully explored in the 2021 TV adaptation.
Alanna Mosvani	The Wheel of Time	1990–2013	Brandon Sanderson	Alanna's relationship with Ihvon and Owein/Maksim was hinted at in the original text, but only fully explored in the 2021 TV adaptation.
Multiple characters	Dreyd	2007	Daniel Help Justice	Tarsa, a priestess, warrior, and bisexual woman, becomes involved in a polyamorous love triangle.
Owein/Maksim	The Wheel of Time	1990–2013	Robert Jordan	His relationship with Alanna and Ihvon was hinted at in the original text, but only fully explored in the 2021 TV adaptation. He is named Owein in the original text but renamed "Maksim" in the adaptation, potentially to avoid confusion with Owyn.
Owein/Maksim	The Wheel of Time	1990–2013	Brandon Sanderson	His relationship with Alanna and Ihvon was hinted at in the original text, but only fully explored in the 2021 TV adaptation. He is named Owein in the original text but renamed "Maksim" in the adaptation, potentially to avoid confusion with Owyn.
Reese	Inheritance	2014	Malinda Lo	Reese, the bisexual protagonist, has feelings for her best friend, David, and her ex-girlfriend, Amber, with resulting polyamory.
Rhuarc	The Wheel of Time	1990–2013	Robert Jordan	The husband of Amys and in a polycule with Lian, who is the sister-wife of Amys. Part of the Aiel culture, which commonly practice polyamory.
Rhuarc	The Wheel of Time	1990–2013	Brandon Sanderson	The husband of Amys and in a polycule with Lian, who is the sister-wife of Amys. Part of the Aiel culture, which commonly practice polyamory.
Elayne Trakand	The Wheel of Time	1990–2013	Robert Jordan	In a polycule with Aviendha, Min and Rand.
Elayne Trakand	The Wheel of Time	1990–2013	Brandon Sanderson	In a polycule with Aviendha, Min and Rand.

== Live-action television ==
Characters	Actors	Title	Duration	Notes	Country
Alma	Britne Oldford	American Horror Story: Asylum	2012–2013	In a brief romantic relationship with Kit and Alma, but it ends with one of them murdering another.	United States
Archie Andrews	KJ Apa	Riverdale	2017–2023	In the series finale, the four main characters are in "a quad" relationship.	United States
Miranda Barlow	Louise Barnes	Black Sails	2014–2017	In a relationship with James Flint and Thomas Hamilton.	United States
Maddie Bishop	Fola Evans-Akingbola	Siren	2018–2020	Ryn kisses Ben and Maddie in season one and describes them as "love" and the show hints to a future polyamorous relationship. They begin their polyamorous relationship in season two, sleep together and Maddie declares their relationship at a dinner with her parents. However, due to the events in the season two finale, Maddie breaks up with Ben and begins dating another person. Although it is implied that she is still in a relationship with Ryn, it is portrayed in an ambiguous manner and the narrative pays more attention to Ben and Ryn's relationship.	United States
Wolfgang Bogdanow	Max Riemelt	Sense8	2016–2018	All the members of the August 8 cluster frequently engage in psychic orgies with each other. Kala is engaged to Rajan Rasal at the start of the series but does not love him. Wolfgang is another member of the cluster who she begins a romantic relationship with. Over the course of the series she begins to fall in love with Rajan, and in the finale decides to be with both of them. They have a threesome.	United States
Anne Bonny	Clara Paget	Black Sails	2014–2017	In a polyamorous relationship with Jack Rackham and Max throughout season two, with all three having multiple threesomes onscreen after Anne begins having sex with Max.	United States
Caro	Delfina Chaves	Felices los 6 (Six Is Not A Crowd)	2024–	Introduces her new boyfriend, Damiano to her already existing polycule which includes her independent relationships with Pato and Gonzalo, the latter who in turn is in a triad with Trinidad and Lautaro.	Argentina
Betty Cooper	Lili Reinhart	Riverdale	2017–2023	In a quad relationship with Archie Andrews, Jughead Jones, and Veronica Lodge as indicated in the series finale.	United States
Tom Cunningham	Ellis Hollins	Hollyoaks	2019	Tom is briefly in a three-way polyamorous relationship with Harley Frater (Mollie Lambert) and Peri Lomax (Ruby O'Donnell) but Harley breaks up with both of them a few weeks later.	United Kingdom
Kala Dandekar	Tina Desai	Sense8	2016–2018	Engaged to Rajan Rasal but doesn't love him, and in a relationship with Wolfgang Bogdanow, and during the series, she falls in love with Rajan. In the series finale, she decides to be with both of them and they have a threesome.	United States
Bo Dennis	Anna Silk	Lost Girl	2010–2015	Bo is a bisexual succubus which must sustain herself by feeding from the life force of male and female Fae and humans, via oral intake or the energy created through sex. In the first two seasons she was involved in a romantic triangle involving Dyson (a heterosexual shapeshifter) and Lauren (a lesbian human), with a rivalry existing between the two over Bo. Later on, Bo tried to have a monogamous relationship with Lauren, with Bo and Lauren remaining in love with each other through ups and downs, and later accept each other as a couple by the end of the series.	United States
Camina Drummer	Cara Gee	The Expanse	2015–2022	In season 5, it's revealed that Drummer is part of a polyamorous wedding with her crew, with her actress, Cara Gee, describing it as the beginning of a "love relationship...[with] a polyamorous, beautiful, queer family" and says she was thrilled to represent that in the show.	United States
Ryn Fisher	Eline Powell	Siren	2018–2020	Kisses Maddie Bishop and Ben Pownall, in season one, with the show saying they are in love, and hinting at a future polyamorous relationship, which they begin in season 2.	United States
James Flint (McGraw)	Toby Stephens	Black Sails	2014–2017	Captain James Flint is revealed in season two, episode five to have been in a relationship with not just Miranda Barlow, but her husband, Thomas Hamilton. It is this relationship that made England force him away.	United States
Harley Frater	Mollie Lambert	Hollyoaks	2019	Harley is briefly in a three-way polyamorous relationship with Tom Cunningham (Ellis Hollins) and Peri Lomax (Ruby O'Donnell) but she breaks up with both of them.	United Kingdom
Hernando Fuentes	Alfonso Herrera	Sense8	2016–2018	In a relationship with Lito Rodríguez, and later with Daniela Velázquez.	United States
Grace	Lizzie Brocheré	American Horror Story: Asylum	2012–2013	In a brief romantic relationship with Kit and Alma, but it ends with one of them murdering another.	United States
Thomas Hamilton	Rupert Penry-Jones	Black Sails	2014–2017	In a relationship with James Flint and Miranda Barlow.	United States
Gemma Hastings	Thalissa Teixeira	Trigonometry	2020–present	This British drama series follows Gemma Hastings and Kieran Lovell, a couple who is forced to take in a lodger to make ends meet. They take in Ramona "Ray" Wilson (Ariane Labed) and the triad grows close, each developing feelings for the others.	United States
Aiko Hojo	Honami Suzuki	Legal High	2012–2014	Satoru Shima, Eiichi Udagawa and Tetsupei Takiguchi are a polyamorous throuple.	Japan
Audrey Hope	Emily Alyn Lind	Gossip Girl	2021–2023	In a romantic relationship with Max Wolfe and Akeno "Aki" Menzies.	United States
Countess Elizabeth Johnson	Lady Gaga	American Horror Story: Hotel	2015–2016	The Countess begins a relationship with famed film actor Rudolph Valentino and his wife, Natacha Rambova, as seen in episode seven.	United States
Jughead Jones	Cole Sprouse	Riverdale	2017–2023	In a quad relationship with Archie Andrews, Betty Cooper, and Veronica Lodge as indicated in the series finale.	United States
Kit	Evan Peters	American Horror Story: Asylum	2012–2013	In a three-years-later flashback, Kit, Alma, and Grace start a brief polyamorous relationship, raising children together. Kit is explicitly involved with both Alma and Grace. It ends with one of the partners murdering another.	United States
Veronica Lodge	Camila Mendes	Riverdale	2017–2023	In a quad relationship with Archie Andrews, Betty Cooper, and Jughead Jones as indicated in the series finale.	United States
Peri Lomax	Ruby O'Donnell	Hollyoaks	2019	Peri is briefly in a three-way polyamorous relationship with Tom Cunningham (Ellis Hollins) and Harley Frater (Mollie Lambert) but the relationship only lasts a few weeks.	United Kingdom
Kieran Lovell	Gary Carr	Trigonometry	2020–present	In a relationship with Gemma Hastings and later develops feelings for the lodger they take in, Ramona Wilson.	United States
Max	Jessica Parker Kennedy	Black Sails	2014–2017	In a polyamorous relationship with Jack Rackham and Anne Bonny throughout season two, with all three having multiple threesomes onscreen after Anne begins having sex with Max.	United States
Akeno "Aki" Menzies	Evan Mock	Gossip Girl	2021–2023	In a romantic relationship with Max Wolfe and Max Wolfe.	United States
Nandor the Relentless	Kayvan Novak	What We Do in the Shadows	2019–2024	Nandor had 37 wives centuries before the show's setting when he was the ruler of Al-Quolanudar, and loved 35 of them. In a season four episode, he wishes them all back to life using the services of a djinn, and it is revealed that his wives included both "girl-wives" and "guy-wives". He elects to keep only a single wife alive in the modern era however.	United States
Ben Pownall	Alex Roe	Siren	2018–2020	Kissed by Ryan Fisher and Maddie Bishop in season one, with the show saying they are in love, and hinting at a future polyamorous relationship, which they begin in season 2. However, Maddie breaks up with Ben after the season two finale, while Ben and Ryn remain together.	United States
Jack Rackham	Toby Schmitz	Black Sails	2014–2017	In a polyamorous relationship with Max and Anne Bonny throughout season two, with all three multiple threesomes onscreen after Anne begins having sex with Max.	United States
Rajan Rasal	Purab Kohli	Sense8	2016–2018	Engaged to Kala Dandekar and in the series finale, Kala decided to be with him and Wolfgang Bogdanow, with all three having a threesome.	United States
Lito Rodríguez	Miguel Ángel Silvestre	Sense8	2016–2018	Lito and Hernando are dating but are not public because it would ruin Lito's career. Daniela is initially Lito's beard but then becomes a third in their relationship.	United States
Izzy Silva	Priscilla Faia	You Me Her	2016–2020	A call girl hired by Jack Trakarsky, who is married to Emma Trakarsky, and later becomes entangled in this marriage, with all three beginning a romantic relationship.	United States
Jing Tian	Hu Ge	Chinese Paladin 3	2009	Since his reincarnations are General Fei Peng and Long Yan, he deeply loves Tang Xuejian and Long Kui.	China
Emma Trakarsky	Rachel Blanchard	You Me Her	2016–2020	Married to Jack Trakarsky. She later enters a romantic relationship with Izzy Silva, a call girl that Jack hired, and cheated on her with, originally.	United States
Jack Trakarsky	Greg Poehler	You Me Her	2016–2020	Married to Emma Trakarsky. He originally cheats on her with Izzy Silva, a call girl that he hired, but later begins a romantic relationship with Emma and Izzy.	United States
Daniela Velázquez	Eréndira Ibarra	Sense8	2016–2018	Initially the beard of Lito Rodríguez and later enters a romantic relationship with Hernando Fuentes. Daniela's relationship with Lito and Hernando is mostly platonic, though they do sometimes have sex.	United States
Ramona Wilson	Ariane Labed	Trigonometry	2020–present	A lodger who stays with Gemma Hastings and Kieran Lovell, and as the series continues, she develops feelings for both of them.	United States
Max Wolfe	Thomas Doherty (actor)	Gossip Girl	2021–2023	Audrey Hope, Akeno "Aki" Menzies, and Max are a polyamorous throuple.	United States
Li Xiaoyao	Hu Ge	Chinese Paladin	2005	While seeking medicine on Fairy Island, he meets Zhao Ling'er and gets married. He also defeats Lin Yueru in a martial arts competition, and has a complicated love affair with the two heroines.	China

== Web series ==
Characters	Actors	Title	Duration	Notes
Annie	Laura Ramadei	Unicornland	2017	The eight-episode web series focuses on Annie's exploration into polyamory after her divorce.
Astrid Becke	Matthew Mercer (original); Ivanna Sakhno (animated)	Critical Role campaign two & its animated adaptation	2018–2021 (original); 2025–present (animated)	In a triad with Caleb Widogast and Eadwulf Grieve.
Camile	Sirita Wright	195 Lewis	2017	In a romantic relationship with another Black woman, Yuri.
Dana	Dana Hobson	The Poly Couple	2022–present	A series following fictional versions of real-life polyamorous couple Dana Hobson and Daniel Wolf of Dana and the Wolf.
Daniel	Daniel Wolf	The Poly Couple	2022–present	A series following fictional versions of real-life polyamorous couple Dana Hobson and Daniel Wolf of Dana and the Wolf.
Caleb Gallo	Brian Jordan Alvarez	The Gay and Wondrous Life of Caleb Gallo	2016	This YouTube show began in 2016 and shows a couple working through their decision to convert from monogamy to polyamory, like Brian Jordan Alvarez, who considers himself polyamorous.
Eadwulf Grieve	Matthew Mercer (original); RedChild (animated)	Critical Role campaign two & its animated adaptation	2018–2021 (original); 2025–present (animated)	In a triad with Caleb Widogast and Astrid Becke.
Caleb Widogast	Liam O'Brien	Critical Role campaign two & its animated adaptation	2018–2021 (original); 2025–present (animated)	Caleb was in a triad with Eadwulf Grieve and Astrid Becke as part of his backstory; Eadwulf and Astrid are otherwise antagonists. Caleb also went on to appear in campaign three.
Yuri	Rae Leone Allen	195 Lewis	2017	Yuri and Camile are two Black women in a new romantic polyamorous relationship, with the series following their struggles with "jealousy and self-doubt". The series received the Breakthrough Series – Short Form award from the Gotham Awards.

== Video games ==
Characters	Voice Actors	Title	Year	Notes
Celia	Julia McIlvaine	Date Everything!	2025	After the player character has helped her and Florence stop a pyramid scheme, they can get them to reveal their feelings for one another. The player character can reveal their own feelings for both of them, and join the new relationship as well.
Dirk	Johnny Yong Bosch	Date Everything!	2025	As the player character helps them through their troubled relationship, Harper and Dirk will invite them to join them as their third.
Drysdale	Neil Newbon	Date Everything!	2025	Once the player character gets Drysdale and Washford to reconcile, they can join their relationship as a third partner.
Elnina	N/A	Deltarune, event happens during Chapter 3	2018 (game release year) 2025 (Chapter 3 release year)	During the game's third chapter, Elnina and her boyfriend Lanino briefly enter a polyamorous relationship with character Rouxls Kaard, and come to not enjoy his company. This results in the two of them breaking up with him later in the chapter and, if the character Starwalker was found during the first chapter, bringing him into their relationship instead.
Florence	Anne Yatco	Date Everything!	2025	After the player character has helped her and Florence stop a pyramid scheme, they can get them to reveal their feelings for one another. The player character can reveal their own feelings for both of them, and join the new relationship as well.
Harper	Laura Bailey	Date Everything!	2025	As the player character helps them through their troubled relationship, Harper and Dirk will invite them to join them as their third.
Lanino	N/A	Deltarune, event happens during Chapter 3	2018 (game release year) 2025 (Chapter 3 release year)	During the game's third chapter, Lanino and his girlfriend Elnina briefly enter a polyamorous relationship with character Rouxls Kaard, and come to not enjoy his company. This results in the two of them breaking up with him later in the chapter and, if the character Starwalker was found during the first chapter, bringing him into their relationship instead.
Megaera	Avalon Penrose	Hades	2020	The player can take a story route that leads to Megaera forming a polyamorous triad with Zagreus and Thanatos.
Rex	Al Weaver (XC2) Fergus O'Donnell (XC3FR)	Xenoblade Chronicles 3	2022	Towards the ending of the main game, there is a photo of Rex and the cast of Xenoblade Chronicles 2 grown up, with Rex standing behind the chairs of Nia, Pyra and Mythra, who are each holding a baby in their hands, heavily implying that they are his.
Rouxls Kaard	N/A	Deltarune, event happens during Chapter 3	2018 (game release year) 2025 (Chapter 3 release year)	During the game's third chapter, Rouxls briefly enters a polyamorous relationship with characters Lanino and Elnina, who do not enjoy his company. This results in the two of them breaking up with him later in the chapter and, if the character Starwalker was found during the first chapter, bringing him into their relationship instead.
"The Original" Starwalker	N/A	Deltarune, event happens during Chapter 3	2018 (game release year) 2025 (Chapter 3 release year)	During the game's third chapter, after Lanino and Elnina break up with Rouxls Kaard, Starwalker can join their relationship if he was found during the first chapter.
Thanatos	Christopher Saphire	Hades	2020	The player can take a story route that leads to Thanatos forming a polyamorous triad with Megaera and Zagreus.
Washford	David Sobolov	Date Everything!	2025	Once the player character gets Drysdale and Washford to reconcile, they can join their relationship as a third partner.
Zagreus	Darren Korb	Hades	2020	The player can take a story route that leads to Zagreus forming a polyamorous triad with Thanatos and Megaera.

== See also ==
- List of polyamorists
- Epicenity
- LGBTQ themes in comics
- List of animated series with LGBTQ characters
- List of LGBT-themed speculative fiction
- List of LGBT characters in soap operas
- List of LGBTQ-related films
- Lists of LGBTQ figures in fiction and myth
