= Mollie Lambert (actress) =

British actress

- Education: Fourth Monkey Actor Training Company
- Occupation: Actress
- Years active: 2015–present
- Television: Hollyoaks

Mollie Lambert is a British actress. After being involved in her father's drama company as a child, she trained as an adult at the Fourth Monkey Actor Training Company. After doing further training, Lambert performed in the stage productions of Russian Dolls (2016), Inside Pussy Riot (2017) and The White Devil (2017). She also filmed commercials and was a main cast member in web programme Dixi, as well as guest starring in Doctors and Casualty. Between 2018 and 2019, Lambert played the regular role of Harley Frater on the British soap opera Hollyoaks. After leaving the soap, Lambert guest starred in Urban Myths and performed in the plays A Thousand Splendid Suns (2019) and Peter Pan (2019–20). She has also co-founded the London theatre company Shrink Theatre.

== Life and career ==
Mollie Lambert had always lived in or around London until being cast in Hollyoaks, when she moved to Liverpool. When she was younger, Mollie Lambert wanted to be a paleontologist after learning about it from the television show Friends. She began acting at the age of eight when she got involved in her father's amateur dramatics company. She was unsure of what to do as a career throughout her time at school and ended up auditioning for National Youth Theatre toward the end of her time at college, and although she did not get in, she thought that going to drama school could be an option for her as she did not consider herself academic. She unsuccessfully auditioned for some other drama schools and ended up auditioning for Fourth Monkey Actor Training Company, and found out that she got in on her birthday. She trained there and graduated in 2014 with a BA after two years. She later did further training at The Actors Class and the Tristan Bates Theatre.

Lambert has filmed commercials for FIFA Worldwide and Three UK, the latter of which she went to Kiev to film. Lambert-starred in an episode of the medical soap opera Doctors that originally aired on 10 September 2015. The following year, Lambert portrayed Camelia in Russian Dolls, which ran at the King's Head Theatre from 5–23 April 2016. Lambert's performance was praised by Sophia Shluger from Londonist, who called Lambert "immensely talented" and opined that she and her co-star Stephanie Fayerman were a "pure pleasure to watch, leaving you feeling not only that you know them personally but that you may have a bit of both of them in yourself." Sarah Tattersall from Everything Theatre opined that Fayerman and Lambert were "the perfect embodiment" of their roles and believed that they gave "engaging performances".

In 2017, Lambert was part of the cast of The White Devil at the Globe Theatre. Lambert later guest-starred in the sixth episode of the 32nd series of the medical drama series Casualty, which aired on 30 September 2017. Lambert has also appeared as a regular cast member in the third and fourth series of the interactive web programme Dixi, portraying Addie. Lambert was at a graphic novel book launch when she got the call from her agent telling her that she got the part in Dixi. Of the routine of being on the show, Lambert said, "I really thrive on having a routine, so getting a list of call sheets through was a dream come true for someone who likes to know what they are doing every minute of every day! It was really nice going home in the evening and knowing what we were doing the next day." In November 2017, it was announced that Lambert had been cast in the all female production of Inside Pussy Riot, which ran from 16 November to 24 December of that year at the Saatchi Gallery.

In April 2018, it was announced that Lambert would be joining the cast of the British soap opera Hollyoaks as new character Harley Frater, who would be involved in the homelessness storyline of Peri Lomax (Ruby O'Donnell). Of the casting, Lambert said, "I am so pleased to be introduced into the Hollyoaks family and looking forward to getting stuck in. It's been a privilege to have worked with The Whitechapel Centre and Centrepoint and learn how homelessness can happen to anyone. Hopefully this story can help raise awareness of these and other charities that work so hard to help people who find themselves without a place to live." Her first appearance was in the episode originally airing on 13 April 2018. For the role, Lambert wore a wig of dreadlocks. Shortly after her debut, Lambert's character was involved in a special episode focussing on homelessness, which also showed how Peri had met and become friends with Harley. Lambert did research on homelessness and felt affected by the issue. She also found it difficult as she had not done a lot of work in a soap opera before, but enjoyed playing Harley and being part of the cast, calling it a "really big family".

During Lambert's time on the soap, Harley's storylines included beginning a romance with Peri, being targeted and almost killed by Peri's former friend Nico Blake (Persephone Swales-Dawson) and beginning a polyamorous relationship with Peri and Tom Cunningham (Ellis Hollins). Lambert also worked with Peter Ash, who played Ron, a man who took advantage of Harley and gave her drugs; Ash called Lambert "absolutely cracking". Lambert's contract was initially for six months but it was later extended to a year. Lambert later left the role and her final appearance originally aired on 8 March 2019, with her exit not having been announced beforehand; Harley's departure saw the character leave to work with orangutans. On Instagram, Lambert thanked fans for their support and messages. She also made a separate post where she paid tribute to Hollins and O'Donnell, writing, "I loved my year on Hollyoaks and have a new found respect for what it takes to work in a soap. These two [Hollins and O'Donnell] have been doing this for such a large part of their lives & they do it so well & made my year an absolute joy & one of the funnest crews I've had the pleasure of working with. Big, big love to absolutely everyone who plays a hand in putting together the show & all those who watch with appreciation for what we do".

In March 2019, it was announced that Lambert had been cast in the stage adaptation of A Thousand Splendid Suns. The production was first performed at Birmingham Repertory Theatre in May of that year before going on tour across the country. In the production, Lambert played various female roles, like other cast members did, in addition to portraying the young boy Zalmai. Despite not usually reading books, Lambert read the novel and considered it a "beautiful story". That same year, Lambert appeared in an episode of the third series of the comedy-drama Urban Myths. For this role, Lambert travelled to Sofia and worked with Sarah Solemani, who she was in "awe" of. Later that year, Lambert portrayed Michael Darling in Peter Pan, which ran from December 2019 to 19 January 2020 at the Birmingham Repertory Theatre; it was the second time that she performed in that theatre. Lambert was initially a bit reluctant to be away from home but enjoyed being in the production and flying as part of the role.

In addition to acting, Lambert has also co-founded Shrink Theatre, a theatre company in London. Between acting jobs, Lambert has worked as a waitress, in call centres and for Royal Mail. Mollie has also written poetry and has expressed interest performing spoken word. She also has an interest in architecture.

== Acting credits ==
=== Filmography ===
| Year | Title | Role | Notes | Ref. |
|---|---|---|---|---|
| Unknown | Dixi | Addie | Interactive web programme | |
| 2015 | Doctors | Jade Halsall | 1 episode ("The Heart of England") | |
| 2017 | Casualty | Daisy Williams | 1 episode (Series 32, episode 6) | |
| 2018–19 | Hollyoaks | Harley Frater | Regular role | |
| 2019 | Urban Myths | 1 episode ("Madonna and Basquiat") | Young Fan | |

=== Theatre ===
| Year | Production | Role | Venue(s) | Ref. |
|---|---|---|---|---|
| 2016 | Russian Dolls | Camelia | King's Head Theatre | |
| 2017 | Inside Pussy Riot | —N/a | Saatchi Gallery | |
| 2017 | The White Devil | —N/a | Globe Theatre | |
| 2019 | A Thousand Splendid Suns | Various characters | Various (UK tour) | |
| 2019–20 | Peter Pan | Michael Darling | Birmingham Repertory Theatre | |
