= David Henty =

Former master forger

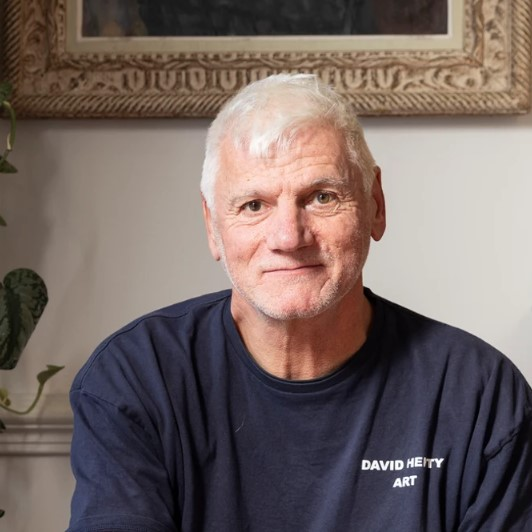
- Website: https://www.davidhentyartforger.co.uk

David Henty (born 1958) is a former master forger. Acclaimed as 'the brushstroke alchemist,' his works are renowned for the accuracy and authenticity with which he paints perfect copies of original works by master painters. Henty copies works by Caravaggio, Pablo Picasso, Amadeo Modigliani, Vincent Van Gogh, Jean-Michel Basquiat and others. Many of Henty's forgeries have been sold by art dealers and auction houses as original works and are unknowingly included in many collections around the world. His paintings regularly sell for thousands of pounds.

In 2022 Henty provided the inspiration for the art forger character at the centre of Peter James' novel Picture You Dead and painted the 'lost' work by Jean-Honore Fragonard at the heart of the narrative. 'Everybody I show the work to is astounded' James said. 'He can copy so many artists from Fragonard to Caravaggio. They're just stunning.'

== Art forgery ==
As a teenager Henty worked with his father, an antiques dealer. This experience instilled in Henty a love for old objects and the sense of how value can be manipulated. In the 1990s Henty found himself on the wrong side of the law and he was imprisoned in the UK for forging passports and in Spain for selling stolen cars.

During his time in prison Henty developed not only his skill at painting but the methodology he now uses to faithfully recreate great masters' works. Henty found he could mentally transport himself out of his immediate surroundings by immersing himself in the life and work of an artist and meditating on a painting, brushstroke by brushstroke. By mentally submerging himself in this way, Henty discovered a flow state in which he could work and accurately and authentically recreate the artist's work.

=== Exposed by The Telegraph ===
After he was released from prison Henty worked for a period under his own name. He then started creating forgeries and selling them on eBay. For these early works he developed the tricks of the forger's trade. He used age-appropriate materials, such as the correct canvas and pigments for the artist and period chosen. He finished the works with fake stamps and artificial ageing methods. His forgeries were accompanied on eBay with descriptions that suggested the works could be authentic, if only they had a traceable provenance.

In 2014 Henty was investigated by The Telegraph newspaper and he admitted selling over one hundred forgeries on eBay. Though eBay closed Henty's account, they could not stop his forgeries, which he continued to sell using alternative internet addresses. When The Telegraph followed up on Henty's story in 2015 and revealed his continuing illegal activities he turned the tables, thanking the newspaper for the free publicity which Henty used to launch his legitimate career as the best copyist of art in the world today.

He wrote: 'Since you did those stories, I have had quite a few new commissions. People read about... and send me letters requesting I do copies for them of masterpieces. As a result, I decided to go straight and business is brilliant. I can't thank The Telegraph enough.'

Revelling in his notoriety, Henty has since sold his works through several well-known galleries in the UK and through his website. His recreations of works by Picasso, Modigliani, Basquiat and other masters attracts prices in the range of thousands of pounds. Henty detailed his eBay activities and his unmasking as a forger in an interview on GB News.

== Picture You Dead ==
In 2022 Henty contributed inspiration and information for the 'Daniel Hegarty' art forger character at the centre of Peter James' 18th 'Roy Grace' novel Picture You Dead. Henty and James met in 2016 when James was researching the non-fiction work Death Comes Knocking he co-authored with former commander of Brighton and Hove police, Graham Bartlett. Bartlett was the policeman who arrested Henty in the 1990s for forging passports and it was he who suggested they meet.

Henty provided insights into the art forger's methods for the 'Hegarty' character and he demonstrated many of the dark arts while creating the 'lost' Fragonard painting at the centre of the mystery. Henty sourced a canvas from the period, the 1770s, and mixed his paint using pigments from the same era. He finished the forgery by heating it in front of the fire to create craquelure and fabricated patina by hanging it in the lounge room of a friend who smoked two packets of cigarettes a day.

Henty contributed to the stage design of the play Picture You Dead which is touring the UK from February to July 2025. Henty painted the forgeries of famous works that adorn the forger's den in the play. Former Coronation Street actor Peter Ash plays the 'Hegarty' character based on Henty in the play, which is adapted from the Peter James novel. The master crime writer James is 'in awe' of Henty's talent as a forger and believes Henty is 'the nicest villain I've ever met.'

== Other Media ==
Henty's other notable media involvements include a segment titled The Copycat Artist on BBC Radio 4 Today show and a documentary titled My Fake Picasso Went to Auction at $1.4 Million for Vice Media. In 2023, Henty created a forgery of Jean-Michel Basquiat's work for Channel 4's The Greatest Auction.

== Publications ==
In 2022 Henty published Art World Underworld, an innovative fictional take on the conventional art forger's memoir.

Henty has said of his forgeries:

'Most ordinary people are not going to be able to put a quarter of a million pound painting on their wall. But for a few hundred quid you can own one that looks like it. I am just bringing art to the masses, affordable art.'
