= List of polyamorists =

This is a list of notable and historic figures who have been or are polyamorous. Polyamory is the practice of, or desire for, romantic relationships with more than one partner at the same time, with the informed consent of all partners involved.

== A ==
- Courtney Act, drag queen, television host, and singer
- László Ágoston, baritone and marketer

== B ==
- Joey Badass, rapper and actor
- Derrick Barry, drag queen, Britney Spears impersonator, and reality television personality
- Olive Byrne, co-creator of the character Wonder Woman

== C ==
- Richard Carrier, activist, author, blogger, and speaker
- Greta Christina, blogger, speaker, and author
- Ethan Coen, director, writer, producer, editor
- Sasha Colby, drag queen and beauty pageant competitor, winner of season 15 of Rupaul's Drag Race

== D ==
- Ian Danskin, YouTuber, most well known for his series on the alt-right
- Catherine Dorion, artist, activist, and Member of the National Assembly of Quebec (2018–2022)
- Gabe Dunn, writer and podcaster

== E ==
- Dossie Easton, co-author of The Ethical Slut and other works
- Clint Eastwood, actor and director

== F ==
- Leonor Fini, painter, writer.

== G ==
- Terisa Greenan, writer, actress, filmmaker, and creator of Family: the web series

== H ==
- Laurell K. Hamilton, writer, known for Anita Blake: Vampire Hunter
- Janet Hardy, writer and sex educator, and founder of Greenery Press
- Elizabeth Holloway Marston, psychologist, co-creator of the character Wonder Woman
- Brenda Howard, bisexual rights activist

== I ==
- Carrie Ichikawa Jenkins, philosopher

== J ==
- Robert Jordan, writer, known for The Wheel of Time

== K ==
- Kat Blaque, youtuber and LGBT activist
- Alfred Kinsey, scientist and biologist

== L ==
- Abraham Lincoln, who had one wife and many close relationships with other men, see Sexuality of Abraham Lincoln.

== M ==
- Jena Malone, actress
- William Moulton Marston, psychologist, lawyer, inventor, and comic book writer who co-created the character Wonder Woman
- Elise Matthesen, author
- Ezra Miller, actor and singer
- Janelle Monáe, singer, songwriter, rapper and actress, has acknowledged having been in both polyamorous and monogamous relationships

== N ==
- Bif Naked, singer
- Ne-Yo, singer, songwriter, and record producer, in 2025 revealed being in polyamorous relationships with four women
- Graham Nicholls, artist and writer, in 2009 founded www.polyamory.org.uk, the United Kingdom's first website about polyamory; at the time he was in a polyamorous triad with two female partners
- Ify Nwadiwe, actor and comedian.

== O ==
- Ahamefule J. Oluo, musician, trumpeter, composer, stand-up comedian, and writer

== P ==
- Amanda Palmer, musician and performance artist.

== R ==
- Darrel Ray, psychologist, speaker and author
- Eleanor Roosevelt, First Lady of the United States, 1st Chair of the United Nations Commission on Human Rights

== S ==
- Jane Schoenbrun, filmmaker
- Willow Smith, singer, rapper, actress and dancer

== T ==
- Kim TallBear, academic
- Cecilia Tan, writer, editor, sexuality activist, and founder and manager of Circlet Press
- Tristan Taormino, feminist author, sex educator, and pornographic film director
- Nico Tortorella, actor

== V ==
- Voltaire

== W ==
- Celeste West, librarian and author, known for her alternative viewpoints in librarianship and her authorship of books about lesbian sex and polyfidelity
- Lindy West, writer, comedian and activist

== Y ==
- Yungblud, musician and actor

== Z ==
- Morning Glory Zell-Ravenheart, author and Neopagan An advocate of polyamory, she is credited with coining the word

== See also ==
- List of fictional polyamorous characters
