= Harley Frater =

- Hollyoaks character
- Portrayed by: Mollie Lambert
- Duration: 2018–19
- First appearance: 13 April 2018
- Last appearance: 8 March 2019
- Introduced by: Bryan Kirkwood
In-universe information
- Occupation: Student; Pop up cinema worker Animal Protection worker

Harley Frater is a fictional character from the British soap opera Hollyoaks, played by Mollie Lambert. The character and casting was announced on 10 April 2018 and Lambert's first appearance as Harley aired three days later on 13 April. Lambert was originally contracted for six months and this was later extended to a year. Harley was characterised as being brave and bold and was introduced as a homeless teenager that established character Peri Lomax (Ruby O'Donnell) meets when she is living on the street. Hollyoaks worked with the charities Centrepoint and The Whitechapel Centre to explore the homelessness storyline, and Lambert did research into the topic beforehand. After appearing in a special episode about the experience of being homeless, Harley moves into Peri's family home, which causes tension with Peri's mother Leela Lomax (Kirsty-Leigh Porter). Harley later kisses Peri and despite Peri initially rejecting her, the pair begin a romantic relationship. Digital Spy reported how various viewers shipped the two characters. However, the couple face various obstacles, including Peri's former friend Nico Blake (Persephone Swales-Dawson) trying to kill Harley, Harley's struggles at school due to her illiteracy, and Harley's jealousy of Peri's friendship with her ex-boyfriend Tom Cunningham (Ellis Hollins). Harley, Tom and Peri later begin a three-way polyamorous relationship, but this does not work out and Harley leaves the village for a fresh start, with her unannounced exit airing on 8 March 2019. Lambert praised the soap and the character following her departure.

== Casting ==
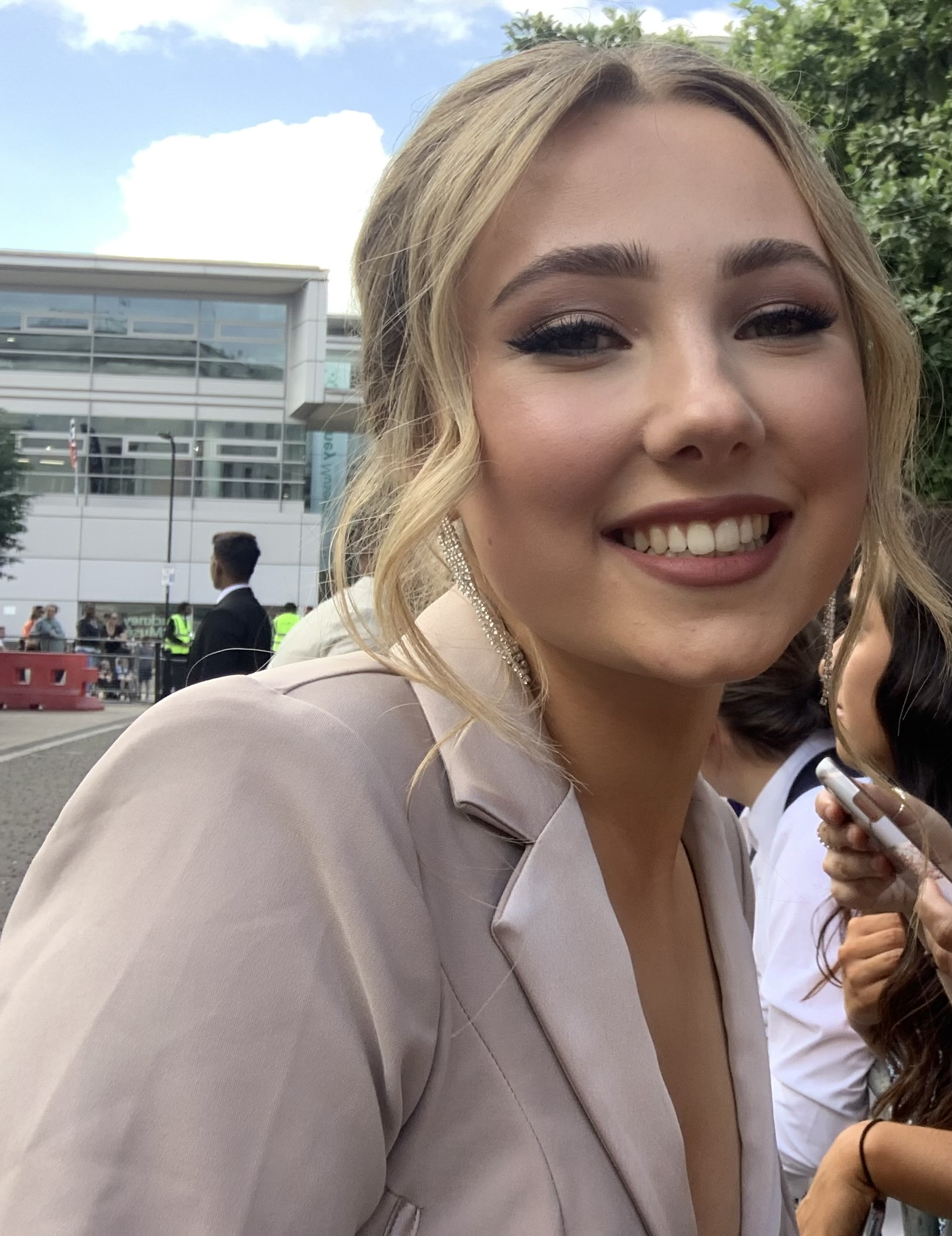
Ruby O'Donnell (pictured) plays Peri, who meets Harley whilst homeless

On 10 April 2018, it was announced that Mollie Lambert had been cast as new regular character Harley Frater on the British soap opera Hollyoaks as part of a homelessness storyline involving established character Peri Lomax (Ruby O'Donnell). Harley was characterised as being a young homeless girl who is "brave, bold" and having "nothing to lose", as well as having lived on the streets for many years. It was also teased that an upcoming special episode about homelessness would reveal how Harley and Peri met. Lambert's first appearance as Harley aired on 13 April 2018. Of her casting and initial storyline, Lambert said, "I am so pleased to be introduced into the Hollyoaks family and looking forward to getting stuck in. It's been a privilege to have worked with The Whitechapel Centre and Centrepoint and learn how homelessness can happen to anyone. Hopefully this story can help raise awareness of these and other charities that work so hard to help people who find themselves without a place to live." Lambert was also happy to have a job for a longer stint as an actor and was looking forward to exploring Liverpool as she had previously always lived in or around London until being cast on Hollyoaks.

Discussing the character's backstory, Lambert explained that Harley is roughly 18 years old and has been living on the streets for about four years after being kicked out by her mum as she does not agree with the way Harley "lives her life". Lambert did not see many similarities between her and Harley other than believing that both are "quite strong minded". Lambert found acting on Hollyoaks difficult as she had not done any acting on a soap opera before other than a small role in Doctors. She recalled, "One of the directors I worked with on the first few weeks [of Hollyoaks] gave me a piece of advice that I still talk about now [in 2020]. He said that if everyone is working at a heightened performance and you're the one that's playing it like you're just talking to someone as you would in everyday life, you'll be the one that stands out in something like this. I have great admiration for people who work on soaps because they film day in, day out, and churn out so many episodes." For the role, Lambert wore a wig of dreadlocks. Lambert's contract was originally for six months but was later extended to a year, which she was grateful for.

== Development ==
=== Introduction ===
Harley comes to the Hollyoaks village when she finds out that Peri's mother Leela Lomax (Kirsty-Leigh Porter) is offering a £5000 reward for information about where Peri is. Harley "takes advantage of Leela's hospitality" by asking for the money immediately, in addition to food and a shower, as she desperately needs some "home comforts". Leela's boyfriend Louis Loveday (Karl Collins) does not believe that Harley has any information that can help find Peri and hence Leela is unsure who to listen to. Harley then temporarily moves in with Louis and Leela as Leela believes she has a chance to find Peri, but Harley's "true intentions" are revealed when she betrays Leela and steals her purse. Harley then flees and goes back to the streets with Peri.

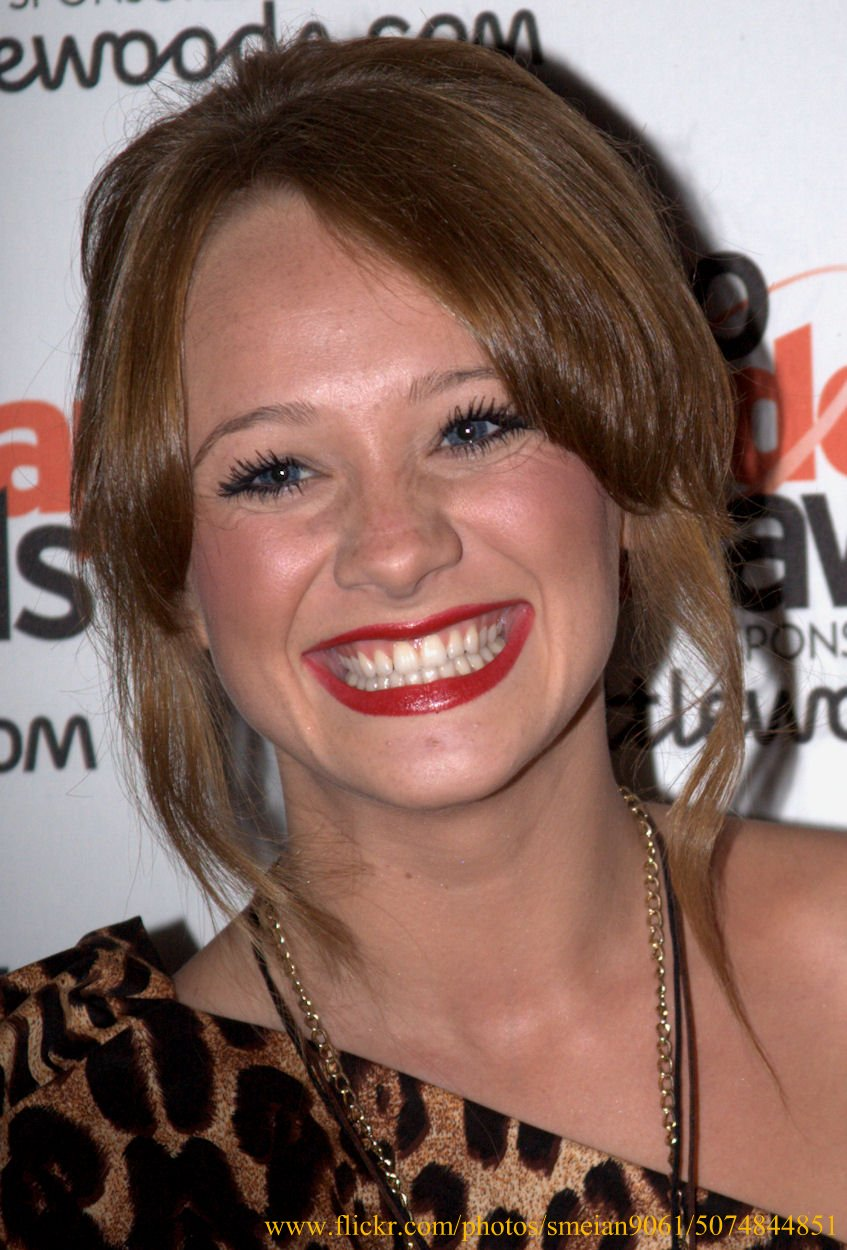
Kirsty Leigh-Porter (pictured) plays Leela, who lets Harley stay at her house

Soon after Harley's debut, she was featured in a special homelessness episode which showed how Peri had met Harley amid Peri's 71 days of homelessness after being kicked out by Leela for lying about being pregnant. The homelessness storyline was devised by Hollyoaks with the charities Centrepoint and The Whitechapel Centre to explore the "shocking, harrowing and brutally harsh realities of sleeping rough" amid a big increase of rough sleeping between 2015 and 2018. Head of Public Affairs at Centrepoint Paul Noblet said that the storyline reflected "the reality for the tens of thousands of young people who find themselves homeless every year with no idea where to turn for help. As well as those who sleep rough, we know there are many more young people sleeping in A&E departments, on night buses, and in some cases, in the beds of strangers [...] Homelessness does not need to define a young person's life if they receive the support they need at the right time."

The episode originally aired on 18 April 2018. It was filmed on location in Liverpool. The episode showed that Peri met homeless youths Dean (Alfie Kingsnorth) and later Harley on the streets and has to endure hunger, bad weather, violence and theft on the streets with them. Harley is introduced to Peri by Dean and she is initially not keen on Peri. Lambert explained that Harley does not start off on good terms with Peri and dislikes her is because Peri is not used to be homeless and Harley does not understand why Peri would leave her non-homeless world. Harley reluctantly agrees to let Peri stay with them in their tent. Peri is shocked to hear Harley and Dean's backstories about how they became homeless and they are angry at her when they find out that her family are trying to get her home. Dean dies in his sleep at the end of the episode, and when Peri tries to get help, she is ignored by strangers, with Harley telling Peri at one point that she is now "worthless" due to being homeless. Harley and Peri are devastated by Dean's death, and Harley rejects Peri and tells to go back to her family as they cannot survive on the streets without Dean. Not wanting to leave Harley alone on the street, Peri "swallow[s] her pride" and ends up returning home to Leela, and tells her mother that she will only return home if Harley moves in with them as well.

Reflecting on the storyline in 2020, Lambert said:

"Harley's homeless storyline was my favourite thing to work on because it was such a good way to go into a show. I could do my research beforehand and have this character in mind. I learnt so much about the issue and I now feel really affected by it, and I don't think I would have as much if I hadn't taken on the role. To be able to focus on the actual story of the character is really beneficial as an actor."

=== Relationship with Peri and danger ===
It was subsequently teased by Metro that there would be "big trouble" when Harley and Peri go to live in the Lomax household. With Harley always around, Leela struggles to reconnect with Peri; Leela later gets concerned and is unsure whether to trust Harley and thus searches through Harley's jacket to find out more about her, but Peri catches her and is furious. Peri tries to make her mother see that letting Harley stay with them is the right thing to do and notes that she would not have survived on the streets without Harley's help. Harley later mistakes Peri's intentions when she tells Harley how much she appreciates her help and tries to kiss Peri, which leaves the latter shocked. Harley's kiss temporarily causes issues to the pair's friendship. Harley and Peri later share a mutual kiss, which leaves Peri confused about her feelings due to her reciprocation. O'Donnell explained, "Peri's very confused at the moment, because she's never had feelings for a girl before and is scared by this. She isn't sure if she's just confusing their feelings of friendship with something more." O'Donnell liked the storyline between Harley and Peri's developing relationship and believed the two characters were contrasting, noting that "opposites attract. She also said that she liked Lambert as a person. Wanting Harley to settle into her new life, Peri makes her a social media profile and finds out that it is her birthday in a few days. Harley then tells Peri that she was considering making contact with her mother but decided against it, and confides how her mother treated her badly and kicked her out because of her sexuality. Wanting to make Harley happier, Peri decides to throw her a party and decides to invite Harley's mother.

It was then reported that Harley and Peri would be in danger due to the return of Peri's former best friend Nico Blake (Persephone Swales-Dawson), who had been presumed dead. O'Donnell explained, "Peri finds out that it's Harley's birthday, and plans to throw a big party for her. But this is 'Hollyoaks', so it obviously doesn't go according to plan and there's some huge teenage dramas going on. There is also an unexpected guest in a mask who turns out to be Nico, and worst of all, Peri is oblivious to the danger that they are all in." In the storyline, Nico has been watching Peri and Harley's friendship from afar and is jealous, and she thus plans to get rid of Harley. Peri is trying to get her friendship with Harley back on track by organising a fancy dress birthday party for Harley, but she finds out that no one wants to come, so Peri offers to pay Lily Drinkwell (Lauren McQueen), Prince McQueen (Malique Thompson-Dwyer) and Hunter McQueen (Theo Graham) to attend as she wants Harley to have a good time. Various other characters end up attending the fancy dress party. Unbeknownst to everyone, Nico has snuck out decides to attend the party disguised in a "creepy" hooded mask in order to take a closer look at Harley as she has gotten closer to Peri, who Nico used to be obsessed with and wanted "her all for herself".

Peri and Harley later get jobs at Brody Hudson's (Adam Woodward) pop up cinema, but Harley does not cope well with the job or with being told what to do by Damon and Damon Kinsella (Jacob Roberts). Harley also dislikes the outfits they have to wear. Nico then escapes from her locked room with knitting needles and it was teased by Metro that she could be making another attempt on Harley's life; O'Donnell had also warned that Peri should be afraid of what Nico is able to do. Nico later escapes from hospital and takes Nico and Harley hostage, typing them up in the cinema. Nico tries to persuade Peri to leave and start a new life with her and her new baby but Peri refuses, and Nico plans to kill Peri.

Despite Nico's attempt the divide Peri and Harley, the pair remain strong and remain close, even taking their friendship to the next level. They eventually become girlfriends. However, they face a further obstacle when they are joined by Harley's old friend Ron (Peter Ash), which puts Harley on edge; Harley tells him to leave her alone when he asks to go back with him, but Metro teased that he would continue trying to make her leave Hollyoaks. Reflecting on the storyline, Ash told Inside Soap in 2019 that he had "great fun", adding, "I had a really nice little part – even though I was playing a horrible person! My character was taking advantage of homeless girl Harley Frater and supplying her drugs, so he wasn't very nice. But the Hollyoaks team was really lovely. I worked a lot alongside Mollie Lambert, who played Harley, and she was absolutely cracking." In September 2018, Harley reacts badly when Breda McQueen (Moya Brady) writes an application for her to attend school.

=== Polyamorous relationship ===
Harley later becomes jealous of Peri's connection with Tom Cunningham (Ellis Hollins), the father of Peri's daughter Steph Cunningham-Lomax, and after struggling at school and failing her subjects, Harley makes Peri angry by announcing that she has left school and will not return. The couple argue and Harley admits she is jealous of the attention Peri has been giving Steph in addition her friendship with Tom, and thus an understanding Peri confides in Tom about this, who says that they should include Harley in their play dates. However, "tension mounts" between Peri and Harley and the latter walks out on Peri, which leaves Peri "crushed" and "distraught". Tom ends up finding out that Harley can barely write or read after trying to get through to her, so he plans to help her. Tom does everything he can to help Harley and suggests she joins Steph's tutoring class; however, he develops romantic feelings for her, admitting to Jack Osborne (Jimmy McKenna) that he wants to her stay around as he likes her, and Harley mistakenly believes that Tom's weird behaviour is because he still has feelings for Peri. Harley confronts Tom and he ends up kissing her, which shocks and angers her, and she shoves him and storms off. Harley is still angry at Tom for forcing himself on her when Peri tries to socialise with the pair together, putting them in an uncomfortable position.

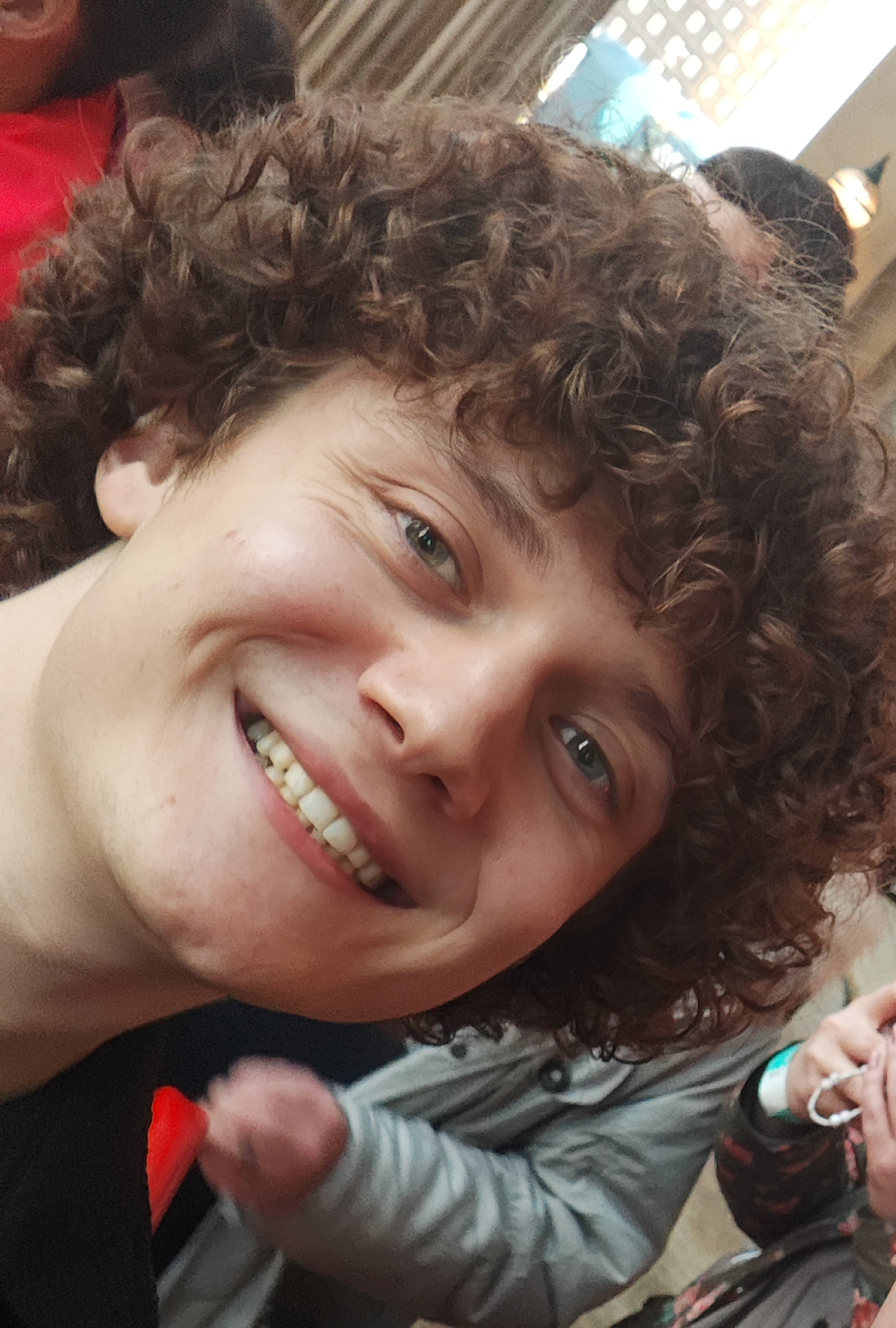
Tom Ellis (pictured) enjoyed the polyamorous relationship between Peri, Tom and Harley

Peri remains unaware that Peri and Tom have feelings for each other. Months later, Peri becomes frustrated with the tension between Harley and Tom; thinking that Harley hates Tom, she locks them in a room together at a fundraiser ball in the hopes that they will talk through their issues. Ellis explained, "Peri doesn't think that Tom and Harley are getting on very well, but really it couldn't be any further from the truth. Tom and Harley like each other but they don't know how to express it, especially because Harley is with Peri." The pair have a heart to heart but then share a kiss, and Tom then tells Peri about this as he feels guilty. Of the kiss, Ellis told Digital Spy, "It's a mutual thing, because Tom and Harley have been flirting a little bit. Tom tells Harley about the events that have happened to him over the years – including how the Cunningham clan have gradually been picked off over the years and he's been left with less family. Harley gets to see that Tom isn't this 'up-his-own-backside guy' – he's actually quite sensitive and he's been through a lot. Harley likes that side of him. Tom's had a crush on Harley for a while, so he doesn't need much persuading." Ellis explained that Tom feels guilty for betraying Peri, but he also feels partially excited as he has found someone he really likes who likes him back, adding, "It's mixed emotions but mainly euphoria that he's finally found someone other than Peri, which was an eternity ago, who's interested in him. He's very happy that he's found someone".

In February 2019, it was announced that Hollyoaks would be exploring polyamory through Peri, Tom and Harley. In the storyline, Peri is hurt and "jilted" after Tom confesses his kiss with Harley right away and she confronts Harley, but Harley is nonchalant and not sorry at all, and also suggests that the three of them enter into a three-way polyamorous relationship. Ellis explained that the polyamory storyline developed from the problem that three of them have to address regarding their feelings and he believed that Tom had a natural reaction to Harley's suggestion, explaining, "for most people, it'd be one of the most unexpected things someone could ask you. Tom is thinking like a typical lad, so he's over the moon. Instead of having one girl that likes him, he has two and he can't believe his luck." Ellis found the scenes fun to film due to being good friends with O'Donnell and Lambert. The actor believed that Tom could get very attached to Harley and believed that viewers would be surprised to see him in this storyline.

"It was interesting and a very different concept to what I'm used to. It's been so much fun to film, because I'm really good friends with Ruby and Mollie. When we were filming, it was all a laugh. If we had kissing scenes, there was no awkwardness afterwards. We're good enough friends to know that it's all fake and you don't have to be embarrassed around each other afterwards. It was amazing to film and it's a very diverse topic. I don't think it's been covered in as much detail as this, so it's been pretty amazing to explore".

— Ellis on Tom, Peri and Harley's polyamorous relationship (2018)

Peri tries to throw herself into the idea by creating a rota to share "Tom time" between her and Harley. However, Harley enjoys having Tom to herself and she moves in with him after a fight with Peri, believing that the latter is "too traditional" for her, which leaves Peri heartbroken. Tom and Peri begin to regret the polyamorous relationship, with Tom becoming exhausted with trying to please both Peri and Harley, whilst Peri is unsure if she actually wants this polyamorous relationship, and it becomes clear to viewers that Harley, Peri and Tom "aren't actually on the same page after all". Whilst Peri's doubts start to increase, Tom and Harley plan a coming out party in order to make their polyamorous romance public, but Peri's uncle Ste Hay (Kieron Richardson) catches Harley and Tom kissing and is furious as he believes that Tom is cheating on Peri, prompting Peri to reveal their three-way relationship. Harley is later seen getting bored with Tom when they spend time together and she tries to seduce him.

=== Departure ===
Lambert exit the role and made a previously unannounced exit in the episode originally airing on 8 March 2019. In the storyline, Harley realises that her polyamorous relationship is not working out and decides to leave Hollyoaks village to have a fresh start working with orangutans, with Tom giving her an envelope of cash from his inheritance money as a gift. Following the airing of the episode, Lambert posted a picture of her on Instagram posing with a toy orangutan and captioned it, "You didn't honestly think [Harley would] settle down did you? She's a free spirit and hey look - I found my first orangutan! Thanks for the kind messages from the start til now & all the support you've shown and continue to give me. Peace, love, happiness & health to all!" In a separate post, Lambert praised Ellis and O'Donnell and said she would miss them, and added, "I loved my year on Hollyoaks and have a new found respect for what it takes to work in a soap. These two have been doing this for such a large part of their lives & they do it so well & made my year an absolute joy & one of the funnest crews I've had the pleasure of working with. Big, big love to absolutely everyone who plays a hand in putting together the show & all those who watch with appreciation for what we do."

In a 2020 interview, Lambert reflected on the role and said, "It was a really fun show to be part of and it was nice to have a guaranteed period of work for such a long time". She missed the routine of the soap and having guaranteed work, adding, "I definitely miss the cast, it's honestly like a really big family and everyone bonds together. The dressing rooms look a bit like Big Brother! I miss Ruby, who plays Peri, as she was great fun to work with. I miss our chats and I miss playing opposite her. I weirdly miss my dreadlock wig which I never thought I’d say! It was so heavy and quite itchy but I actually really miss that image of the character." Lambert liked playing Harley and commented that her character was "really moody but I think she had a lot of reasons to be moody!"

== Storylines ==
Harley meets and befriends Peri Lomax (Ruby O'Donnell) when they are both homeless and living on the streets. Weeks later, Harley finds a missing poster of Peri and meets with her mum Leela Lomax (Kirsty-Leigh Porter) to try to get the £5000 reward for information of Peri. Harley tries stealing Leela's purse but is caught by Leela's boyfriend Louis Loveday (Karl Collins), though Leela does not call the police. Harley returns to the streets to Peri and Dean (Alfie Kingsnorth). After Dean dies of hypothermia, Peri goes back to live with Leela on the condition that Harley can live with them. Harley initially refuses Peri's offer and opts to live with Ron (Peter Ash), who she has to have sex with to have accommodation. However, Peri is convince Harley and she subsequently moves in with the Lomaxes.

To Peri's surprise, Harley kisses Peri at Dean's memorial. Peri rejects Harley and she confides in Peri that her mother disliked her bisexuality. Peri throws Harley an 18th birthday party, where Harley kisses Hunter McQueen (Theo Graham). At the party, Peri's former best friend, Nico Blake (Persephone Swales-Dawson), who was presumed dead, tries to kill Harley out of jealousy but is unsuccessful. Peri admits that she is jealous and has feelings for Harley and they end up having sex. Despite some initial hesitation from headteacher Sally St. Claire (Annie Wallace), Harley enrols at Hollyoaks High School and also begins working at Brody Hudson's (Adam Woodward) pop-up cinema, which she dislikes. Nico kidnaps Harley and Peri and takes them hostage, striking Harley unconscious with a pipe, but Nico does not get away with the plan.

Harley struggles with her schoolwork and gets jealous of Peri spending time with her daughter Steph Cunningham-Lomax and her ex-boyfriend Tom Cunningham (Ellis Hollins), leading to Harley briefly walking out on Peri. Tom finds out that Harley is illiterate and tries to help her. He kisses her and Harley is angry at him for forcing himself on her. At the school ball, Peri locks them in a room together as she believes that Harley and Tom dislike each other, and they end up sharing a kiss. Tom admits this to Peri and Harley suggests they have a three-way polyamorous relationship, which they agree to but later regret. Peri tells Harley that she does not want to be with Tom anymore and wants to be only with her, so Harley moves out as she feels suffocated. However, Harley gets bored with Tom's lifestyle and breaks up with him. Feeling that she does not belong in Hollyoaks, she decides to leave the village, and Tom gives Harley a lot of money so she can achieve her dreams of working with orangutans. She shares tearful goodbyes to Tom and Peri and tells them she loves them both before leaving the village in a taxi.

== Reception ==
Prior to Harley's debut, Duncan Lindsay from Metro questioned whether Harley could trusted, whilst Daniel Kilkelly from Digital Spy believed that Harley took advantage of Leela's hospitality upon her first appearance. Kilkelly's colleague, Sophie Dainty, heavily praised the special homelessness episode that Harley was featured in, writing, "whether you enjoyed this unconventional episode or not, it was certainly hard not to be moved by the raw realities portrayed in it. Bravo, Hollyoaks – you've smashed it again." She believed that it was understandable that Harley and Dean were angry at Peri when they found out that her family were trying to get her back home and noted that the episode showed how homeless people are avoided, explaining, "Through showing us how the trio [of Harley, Dean and Peri] survived on the streets, the scenes highlighted how rare acts of public humanity were nearly always outweighed by the cruel, disrespectful, and invisible way they were treated nearly every day". She also praised Lambert's supporting performance.

A reporter noted that viewers were "really going for" the romantic chemistry between Harley and Peri. After Harley initially kissed Peri, Kilkelly wondered how Peri would react and questioned whether she could let Harley down "gently". His colleague, Rianne Houghton, reported how some viewers "reluctantly" wanted Peri and Harley to get together, with some writing on Twitter that they wanted to see Peri and Harley become a couple. Houghton also reported how some viewers were unhappy about Peri's "selfish" reaction to Harley attempting to kiss her and how the homelessness storyline had not changed her attitude. She also opined that the homelessness storyline came to a "heartbreaking and genuinely brilliant end". Houghton later commented on Nico's "most sinister plan" when she kept Peri and Harley hostage and told Hollyoaks to "leave Peri and Harley alone"; she hoped that the pair were safe but added that she "probably wouldn't bet on it". Dan Seddon from Digital Spy reported how viewers were shipping Peri and Harley after their "surprise" mutual kiss, writing, "The world of social media exploded with reactions to their shocking intimacy". He believed the kiss was unexpected and wrote, "Naturally, it was a slightly tender but awkward experience for the pair". Seddon added, "Hollyoaks has had some incredibly moving storylines recently, but the growing relationship between Harley and Peri has caught the attention of many fans".

Eden-Olivia Lord from Closer Online believed that it was "clear" that Harley was not dealing well with her new job at the cinema. Justin Harp from Digital Spy called Harley's birthday party the "birthday from hell" and opined that it had been a "rough road" for Harley and Peri since Harley had moved in, which he believed was made more confusing by their kiss. Dainty called Peri's decision to invite Harley's mother to the party "bold" and questioned whether Peri's interference could be a mistake and potentially overstepping the line. She later opined that Tom finding out that Harley can barely read or write a "shock discovery". Dainty also believed that Harley made her feelings "unequivocally clear" that she was angry at Tom for kissing her and believed that there would be more "awkwardness" afterwards when Peri tries to take them out. Discussing their mutual kiss months later, Dainty called this a "surprise" and thought it was a betrayal for Peri. She also wrote, "Viewers know that Tom's secret feelings are all the more inappropriate given that Harley is in a relationship with his ex-girlfriend Peri".

Lindsay from Metro called Harley "long suffering" and wondered whether Nico would kill her at the party. Lindsay later speculated that Nico could attempt to kill Harley again and that Nico would make Harley's problems "much worse" if she escaped from her room with knitting needles. He later reported how viewers were hoping that there could be a "good love story" between Peri and Harley. He also questioned whether Ron could make Harley leave the village and cause "heartbreak" for Peri, writing, "Certain aspects of [Harley's] new life such as the pressure of the party, being told what to do by Brody when she worked at the cinema and living with Leela have been hard to adjust to for Harley so might she be tempted to abandon Hollyoaks?" Lindsay opined that Tom had been "playing mediator between Peri and Harley" before they become a polyamorous couple.

Of Harley's polyamorous relationship with Peri and Tom, Katie Baillie from Metro wrote, "Threes a crowd for some, but for this lot it will result in double the romance". She also called it an "important storyline" and hailed it as one of Hollyoaks's "groundbreaking" plots, but she also questioned if Peri, Tom and Harley were really ready to be in a polyamorous relationship. Harp believed that the three-way relationship would make Tom's feelings for Harley "much more complicated". Dainty believed that the three characters were taking "centre stage in a surprising new storyline". Tess Lamacraft from What to Watch believed that the relationship was not "working out" how all three characters "would like it to" and after Harley moved in with Tom, Lamacraft asked, "Are Tom and Harley going to be happy without Peri and is their relationship without her strong enough to go the distance?" She also questioned whether Harley wanted Tom all to herself or if she wanted Peri around too. Lamacraft later called the trio the "happy, or not-so-happy, threesome!" Charlotte Tutton from the Daily Mirror noted how the polyamorous relationship surprised viewers and that viewers hoped it would bring Tom and Peri back together. Sam Warner from Digital Spy called Harley's exit from the soap a "surprise twist".
