= Tom Cunningham =

Fictional character from Hollyoaks

- Hollyoaks character
- Portrayed by: Uncredited (1999–2003); Ellis Hollins (2003–2025)
- Duration: 1999–2025
- First appearance: 28 December 1999
- Last appearance: 5 November 2025
- Introduced by: Jo Hallows
- Spin-off appearances: Hollyoaks Later (2008); Hollyoaks: Tom's Life (2014)
- Crossover appearances: Brookside (2025)
In-universe information
- Occupation: Businessman
- Family: Cunningham
- Father: Gordon Cunningham
- Mother: Helen Cunningham
- Half-brothers: Lewis Richardson; Max Cunningham
- Half-sisters: Dawn Cunningham; Jude Cunningham; Cindy Cunningham; Mandy Richardson
- Wife: Yasmine Maalik (2020–2024)
- Daughters: Steph Cunningham-Lomax
- Nephews: Alfie Nightingale; Hilton Cunningham; DJ; Maddox Keane
- Nieces: Bethany Cunningham; Holly Cunningham; Grace Hutchinson; Ella Richardson

Tom Cunningham is a fictional character from the British Channel 4 soap opera Hollyoaks, played by Ellis Hollins. He made his first appearance during the episode broadcast on 28 December 1999. With Tom being a young child for most of his tenure, his early years featured minimal storylines, including the numerous death of his family, being abused by Clare Devine (Gemma Bissix) and having various guardians including Steph Cunningham (Carley Stenson) and Jack (Jimmy McKenna) and Frankie Osborne (Helen Pearson). However, a turning point came for Tom when it was announced that his girlfriend, Peri Lomax (Ruby O'Donnell) would fall pregnant, and deal with Peri's subsequent decision to give their baby away for adoption. Other storylines have also included his friendships with Nico Blake (Persephone Swales-Dawson) and Dylan Jenkins (James Fletcher) and his relationships with Peri and his foster sister Jade Albright (Kassius Nelson). Tom left the village with half-sister Cindy Cunningham (Stephanie Waring) on 4 September 2024, in an unannounced departure. It was announced on 16 May 2025 that Hollins has reprised his role as Tom for the 30th Anniversary celebrations. His return aired on 8 July 2025. Tom remained on the show for the 30th anniversary he appears on the anniversary episode airing on 22 October 2025 that saw off the character of Peri and crossing over with former soap opera Brookside. Tom's final scenes aired on 5 November 2025.

== Casting ==
The character was introduced during an extended episode broadcast on 28 December 1999.

The character has been played by Ellis Hollins since 2003. The actor's drama teacher Judith Barker learned of the part through an agent friend and put him forward for the role.

On 4 September 2024, Ellis made an unannounced exit from the soap after 21 years, in an interview with Digital Spy he confirmed his exit was part of the cast shakeup.

== Development ==
In February 2019, it was announced that Hollyoaks would be exploring polyamory through Tom, his ex-girlfriend Peri and her new girlfriend Harley Frater (Mollie Lambert. In the storyline, Peri becomes frustrated with the tension between Harley and Tom; thinking that Harley hates Tom, she locks them in a room together at a fundraiser ball in the hopes that they will talk through their issues. Ellis explained, "Peri doesn't think that Tom and Harley are getting on very well, but really it couldn't be any further from the truth. Tom and Harley like each other but they don't know how to express it, especially because Harley is with Peri." The pair have a heart to heart but then share a kiss, and Tom then tells Peri about this as he feels guilty. Of the kiss, Ellis told Digital Spy, "It's a mutual thing, because Tom and Harley have been flirting a little bit. Tom tells Harley about the events that have happened to him over the years – including how the Cunningham clan have gradually been picked off over the years and he's been left with less family. Harley gets to see that Tom isn't this 'up-his-own-backside guy' – he's actually quite sensitive and he's been through a lot. Harley likes that side of him. Tom's had a crush on Harley for a while, so he doesn't need much persuading." Ellis explained that Tom feels guilty for betraying Peri, but he also feels partially excited as he has found someone he really likes who likes him back, adding, "It's mixed emotions but mainly euphoria that he's finally found someone other than Peri, which was an eternity ago, who's interested in him. He's very happy that he's found someone".

"It's been so much fun to film, because I'm really good friends with Ruby and Mollie. When we were filming, it was all a laugh. If we had kissing scenes, there was no awkwardness afterwards. We're good enough friends to know that it's all fake and you don't have to be embarrassed around each other afterwards. It was amazing to film and it's a very diverse topic. I don't think it's been covered in as much detail as this, so it's been pretty amazing to explore".

— Ellis on Tom, Peri and Harley's polyamorous relationship (2018)

In the storyline, Peri is hurt and "jilted" after Tom confesses his kiss with Harley right away and she confronts Harley, but Harley is nonchalant and not sorry at all, and also suggests that the three of them enter into a three-way polyamorous relationship. Ellis explained that the polyamory storyline developed from the problem that three of them have to address regarding their feelings and he believed that Tom had a natural reaction to Harley's suggestion, explaining, "for most people, it'd be one of the most unexpected things someone could ask you. Tom is thinking like a typical lad, so he's over the moon. Instead of having one girl that likes him, he has two and he can't believe his luck." Ellis found the scenes fun to film due to being good friends with O'Donnell and Lambert. The actor believed that Tom could get very attached to Harley due to Tom being really lonely and having lost many people in his life. Ellis also believed that viewers would be surprised to see Tom in this storyline, explaining, "Tom is somewhat of a quiet character who minds his own business, and now he has this 'Hugh Hefner' type of thing going on! He thinks he's all that, because he's with two girls at the same time. Tom thinks he's top dog".

== Storylines ==
Tom is born on Millennium Eve 1999 to parents Gordon Cunningham (Bernard Latham) and Helen Cunningham (Kathryn George). Tom had to deal with a lot of family tragedies. Gordon's daughter Dawn Cunningham (Lisa Williamson) died of leukaemia two years before he was born, the suicide of Helen's son Lewis Richardson (Ben Hull) in 2001, Helen and Gordon are killed in a car crash in 2004 and Tom survived the crash. Helen's daughter Mandy Richardson (Sarah Jayne Dunn) becomes his legal guardian. Some time after, Mandy cannot cope looking after Tom and hands him over to Gordon's son Max Cunningham (Matt Littler). Max and best friend Sam "OB" O'Brien (Darren Jeffries) raise Tom in their flat. Tom runs away from home after overhearing Max tell OB he believes Tom will be better off in care. However, Mandy finds him by his parents' grave.

Max starts a relationship with Clare Devine (Gemma Bissix). When Mandy's baby daughter Grace Hutchinson dies from sudden infant death syndrome, Tom looks for a mother figure in Clare. After Clare and Max marry, he soon begins to see through her. After Tom overhears her on the phone to her father, who she previously claimed was dead, Clare begins to manipulate Tom and makes Max believe Tom is lying. Clare draws on the walls of Max's flat and pours water on his bed sheets and blames Tom's misbehaviour. After Max tells Clare he wants to accompany her to a fertility clinic, Clare poisons Tom's food so he is ill and Max cannot come. Max has a heart attack and grows more ill when Clare stops giving him his medication. At Christmas, Clare takes Max and Tom to a lakeside where Clare pretends Tom has fallen into the water. Max tries to save Tom and almost dies, but is revived by OB. Max finally sees the real Clare and apologises to OB and Tom. Weeks later, Clare tells Tom that he was the cause of his parents' death, and would eventually kill Max. Clare calls a social worker, who arrives just as Tom shouts he does not want to be near Max, and Tom is taken into care. Tom refuses to see Max and but after Max threatens Clare, the brothers meet and Max explains that Clare was lying. Tom then moves back in with Max.

Max begins to get close to Steph Dean (Carley Stenson), who Tom develops a crush on. Max and Steph eventually become a couple, despite Tom's jealousy. While OB takes Tom swimming, he flirts with Summer Shaw (Summer Strallen) and Tom nearly drowns, but is saved by a lifeguard Simon Crosby (Simon Lawson). Gilly Roach (Anthony Quinlan) tells Max that Simon has images of Tom in his swimming costume on his computer, believing he may be a paedophile. When it is revealed that Simon is not a paedophile, Max and OB fall out. However, Tom makes them make up. Max tells Tom he is going to propose to Steph, which he does by putting the ring in a hot cross bun, which Tom eats. Steph and Max watch as Tom is given an x-ray. When Steph sees the ring, Max asks her to marry him, which she accepts. Steph and Max get married. As Max and OB carry a jukebox for Steph later that day, Tom plays on a road. Max notices Niall Rafferty (Barry Sloane) speeding towards Tom, so Max pushes him out of the way. However, he is hit by the car himself, and dies beside Steph, OB and Tom. Tom blames himself but OB convinces him that he did not kill Max, and Clare was wrong. Mandy and OB discuss custody of Tom, with Mandy initially agreeing to take responsibility for her brother. OB, however, decides he wants to become Tom's guardian, but Tom tells OB that Steph needs him more. In Max's will reading, he leaves his estate, £500,000 and MOBS to Steph and Tom. Steph grows closer to Niall, but ends their romance when she catches him angrily grabbing Tom. Following this, Steph and Tom decide to begin a new start, so they leave Hollyoaks together. Tom and Steph then return to Hollyoaks, having spent several weeks with Steph's sister. Steph is worried for her and Tom's safety after learning that Niall killed Kieron Hobbs (Jake Hendriks) and his own half-sister Tina Reilly (Leah Hackett), and tried to murder several others. Steph takes Tom on holiday to Scotland with her brother Craig Dean (Guy Burnet). Unknown to Steph, Niall follows them to Scotland, where he kidnaps Tom. After Tom escapes, he alerts Steph and Craig. Steph tells Niall she does not love him in a confrontation on a cliff. Niall, seeing what he has caused, then kills himself. Steph and Tom then visit Steph's father Johnno, and then they return to Hollyoaks the next day.

Steph then begins dance classes, which Tom and niece Holly Hutchinson (Lydia Waters) attend. Then they are bullied by Persephone Hart (Elizabeth Hadley). The situation is quickly resolved by Steph and Sarah Barnes (Loui Batley). Steph's stepbrother, Darren Osborne (Ashley Taylor Dawson), takes Tom to The Dog on one occasion, which ends up with Tom getting drunk and having to have his stomach pumped. Tom befriends Gilly, who falls in love with Steph and proposes to her. Tom overhears Steph and Nancy Hayton (Jessica Fox) discussing Steph's cervical cancer, which upsets Tom as he again blames himself. Steph however, reassures Tom that she will be fine. Steph is later told her cancer is terminal, which again upsets Tom. He then sings at Steph's wedding to Gilly.

Mandy returns to Hollyoaks to see Steph about custody of Tom when she dies. She takes Tom to Relish for lunch when he sees Warren Fox (Jamie Lomas) at the window, despite Warren's death in 2009. Tom tells Mandy, who tries to convince him that he did not see him. However, Tom then later confides in Frankie Osborne (Helen Pearson) about what happens to people after they die and he begins to believe that he is seeing Warren's ghost. Steph is killed in a fire at Il Gnosh. Tom stays strong to begin with but later begins crying over her death. Tom, Frankie, Jack Osborne (Jimmy McKenna) and Darren then watch a farewell video from Steph which she filmed weeks before.

In January 2011, Tom hears somebody in the kitchen, so warns Jack to investigate. When he does, Jack gets a blow in the head by the intruder. The intruder starts to confront Jack, but Tom gets hold of a cricket bat and hits the intruder on the head unconscious. The intruder appears to be a woman when Jack removes the hood she is wearing and Tom fears that he might have killed her. The girl is revealed to be Frankie's granddaughter, Esther Bloom (Jazmine Franks) and she eventually moves in with the family. Tom finds Esther's presence hard to deal with, especially as he is going to court for his attack on her. However, when he is cleared, he begins to accept Esther and the pair get on well.

There was further trauma for Tom when Gilly was arrested for raping Jacqui McQueen (Claire Cooper). Tom stood by Gilly and was relieved when he was found not guilty. Gilly later came to live with the Osbornes; however, Tom began getting bullied at school because of Gilly. Gilly decided it would be best if he moved out. In November 2011, Tom was devastated when Gilly left Hollyoaks after admitting that he had indeed raped Jacqui. In February 2012, Tom is delighted when Darren and Nancy get married. Later that year, he is further delighted when Nancy gives birth to a baby boy.

When Sienna Blake (Anna Passey) frames Nancy for trying to kill Charlie Dean (Charlie Behan) and Oscar Osborne (Noah Holdsworth), Nancy is taken into a mental institute and Darren and Sienna begin a relationship. Tom realises that Sienna had framed Nancy after catching her trying to breastfeed Oscar. When Sienna begins faking a pregnancy, Tom realises what she is doing and catches her on video with her fake baby bump. Upon finding out about Tom's video, Sienna kidnaps Tom and keeps him in the basement of her childhood home. Sienna lies to Tom that he has caused an explosion in the village and Darren is dead. She tells him that the police are looking to arrest him and she is keeping him safe. When Sienna brings Tom food in a box, there is a newspaper underneath, which shows Darren in a picture. He then hides the newspaper under the bed which Sienna finds it and yells at Tom. He finds a small hole in the wall and pulls pieces off it and covering it with a poster when Sienna comes in. When he is breaking the wall, he hits a security wire causing the alarm to go off. Dodger Savage (Danny Mac) gets a call about it so he sends his and Sienna's father, Patrick Blake (Jeremy Sheffield), who knows about her fake pregnancy, down to check on it. When Tom is running away, he runs into Patrick but gets away. When Sienna arrives back to her engagement party, Darren gives her a ring. Nancy brings in Tom in to the pub and Nancy attacks Sienna. Darren pulls Nancy away but then she grabs at her, ripping her dress, exposing her fake pregnancy to the crowd.

Sienna kidnaps Charlie and Oscar and then goes back to Tom and threatens him, so he leaves with Sienna and she takes him to the Roscoes' garage but just before he goes in, he throws Charlie's toy on the ground. Dodger later sees this and tries to open the door but it's locked. He hears a car running as Sienna is trying to poison them. The police arrive and Tom is yelling for help. When the door is opened, Sienna drives out and tries to hit Darren with the car but Dodger gets in the way so she swerves and crashes. Tom then runs out and is greeted by Esther and Ruby Button (Anna Shaffer). Darren then runs over to him and hugs him. On his 14th birthday, Tom is shocked as Frankie and Jack have agreed to adopt him.

After Sienna is released, Tom and Peri Lomax (Ruby O'Donnell) start a bullying campaign against her and Peri helps Tom to set Sienna up by kidnapping her niece Rose and planting her in Sienna's flat. However, this ends, when they discover Sienna's past and realized it was her father Patrick's fault. After Peri discovers that she has a brain tumour, Tom helps her escape from the hospital. They kiss and she faints from the tumour and they go back to the hospital, where she undergoes a successful operation. In August, when Peri is due to leave for New Zealand, Tom references her as his girlfriend in a conversation. Later, Peri asks if he meant it and then states that she always wanted to be his girlfriend.

When Tom tries to comfort an upset Peri, the two end up having sex, but soon after they say that they should never mention it again and that it won't happen again. Days later, Cameron Campbell (Cameron Moore) later reads a text message, talking about the night they slept together. Cameron later confronts them about it, in front of the whole school, leaving Peri and Tom humiliated. Tom begins to believe that Peri is cheating on him with newcomer Dylan Jenkins (James Fletcher), but is shocked when Peri tells him that she's pregnant. After the two reconcile and admit that they love each other, Tom accompanies Peri to her pregnancy scan. Peri runs out upset but Tom stays behind, receiving scans of their baby. Later, when he shows the scan to Peri, he tells her that though he knows it will be difficult, he wants them to keep the baby and raise it together. However, Peri disagrees saying she just wants things to go back to normal. While Tom intends on becoming a father to his child, Peri would rather have their baby adopted. The two eventually agree to have the baby adopted once it is born.

Tom and Peri talk to Leela's cousin Angela and her husband Mark when they say they would like to adopt the baby. After having a meeting with Angela and Mark, they agree to give their unborn child to them. Tom is still very unsure about the adoption as he holds back tears looking at the baby scan. After Peri bans Tom from the next scan, Tom becomes depressed and buys legal highs from Dylan. He goes to the scan high and knocks over medical equipment as Peri and Angela look on confused. After Dylan dies in a car crash, Tom and Peri make up, but Tom blackmails Peri's father Cameron into stopping the adoption with the information that Cameron killed Peri's grandparents. When Cameron fails, he decides to upload the video confession through the schools video system, but changes his mind. Harry Thompson (Parry Glasspool) accidentally sends the video just as Peri gives birth to a baby girl. Cameron is arrested and Tom says goodbye to his daughter in hospital, and Peri overhears. When Angela and Mark come to see the baby, Peri decides to keep the baby and tells Mark and Angela. Peri also decides to move in with Frankie, Jack and Tom when Peri and Leela fall out. It is later revealed that Tom and Peri have named their daughter in honour of Steph Dean, Tom's former sister-in-law and legal guardian.

In October 2015, Tom is being bullied by an unknown assailant because of his parental responsibilities towards his daughter. The culprit is revealed to be Peri, but Tom is unaware that she is responsible for posting pictures on-line, humiliating him. When Peri attempts to abandon Steph outside Angela's doorstep, it becomes clear that she has post-natal depression. Tom is angry at first about Peri's attempt to abandon the baby and is even angrier when he discovered that Peri is his online bully, but he forgives her after Nancy tells Tom she could be suffering from depression. Tom later befriends Alfie Nightingale (Richard Linnell), and is shocked to discover that Alfie is his nephew, since Alfie was Tom's half-sister Cindy's son.

In 2016, Jade Albright (Kassius Nelson) moves in with the Osbornes. Jade finds out she has cancer and also finds out her boyfriend Alfie does too. Tom comforts Jade with the rest of the Osbornes, helping her through chemotherapy. When Alfie is banned from seeing Jade after causing her to collapse, Tom begins to comfort Jade and begins to like her. Peri begins to notice Tom's feelings towards Jade and starts to grow closer to Tom again. Prior to this, Tom helps Jade and Alfie see each other but Alfie's father, Mac Nightingale (David Easter), stops them. Tom decides to move to London to be with O.B but stops when Nico poisons him. Tom is furious when Jade tells him that Peri has been bullying her and bans Peri from seeing Steph.

Tom is later shocked, when he sees Gordon's daughter Jude Cunningham (Davinia Taylor) is back in the village, and never forgave her for not being there for him since he was young, but Jude told him that she left the village in 1998 to go on the run, due to her being involved in multiple fraud schemes. Tom is devastated when Jade dies from cancer and helps the Osbornes grieve. At the "Halloween Spooktacular" set up by Jude, Tom is angry to discover that it is all a scam and that Jude was going to leave him again. Nico confronts Tom and blames him for getting in the way of her and Peri. She attacks him with a globe and tries to kill him but Jude comes in and saves him. At the hospital, he and Peri, who was also targeted by Nico, make up.

Tom goes on the run with the Osbournes after Jack tells them that somebody is trying to kill them. Tom brings Steph with him. Tom is desperate to return to the village to see Peri and sneaks off to the village. He visits Peri, who is delighted to see him. They meet again in the folly and Peri tells Tom she did it for him and Tom realises that she called the police. Eva Falco (Kerry Bennett), Jack's niece, who is after them, brings Tom to the station. She tells him that she knows that he killed the Osbornes and makes him tell her where they are. OB, who is working for Jack, helps Tom escape, angering Eva. On New Year's Eve, the Osbornes return to the village and it is revealed that Jack murdered a boy when he was young and falsely imprisoned his brother for it. Eva accidentally shoots Esther but she survives.

In May 2017, Tom is involved in a car accident along with Alfie, Lily Drinkwell (Lauren McQueen), Prince McQueen (Malique Thompson-Dwyer) and Yasmine Maalik (Haiesha Mistry). Fortunately, Tom survives with minor injuries. After the crash, Tom is too scared to drive. Darren convinces him to get behind the wheel but Tom isn't ready to face his fears. Peri and Yasmine make fun of him but Lily gives him the support he needs. Tom and Alfie find drugs that Darren has been hiding and they dispose of them, getting Darren into trouble with the drug dealers. Darren stashes heroin in the boot of the car and panics when Nancy reveals that she let Tom borrow the car. The police pull Tom over for driving too slow. The police officer arrives and takes the bag out of the car, but Darren arrives and makes up an excuse so the officer hands over the bag. Darren is later jailed and Tom moves in with the Cunninghams, after the Osbornes are threatened.

In October 2017, Tom attends Jade's memorial at Hollyoaks High when an explosion caused by Mac occurs. Tom gains consciousness and tries to escape from the building, along with Alfie, Peri and Lily, but the roof collapses, trapping them. Peri and Lily escape on a ladder and Tom and Alfie are rescued by firefighters. Tom is devastated when Frankie dies from a stroke, losing another guardian. After turning 18, Tom inherits money from his parents and older brother Max. He is disappointed when he only inherits £1,000. Later, when he reads over the letter again, he realises that the £1,000 was only the monthly interest and that he's now a millionaire. Scheming Darcy Wilde (Aisling Jarrett-Gavin) has her eyes in his fortune. Tom decides to pay the deposit for the Osbornes to buy Nightingale's with his sister Mandy. Darcy steals the deposit and plans to leave the country. Jack turns out to be a taxi driver and when Darcy gets the money out of the bag she realises its monopoly money. Tom decides to call the police but Darcy convinces Jack to let her go and he does, infuriating Tom.

When Cindy asks Tom for a loan to start a new business, he refuses. Cindy steals his debit card and bets all the money on a greyhound, but the greyhound gets disqualified, so she loses all the money. Tom decides to give Cindy the money. Cindy's ex-husband Dirk tells Tom that she stole the money, leaving Tom furious. When Cindy makes a speech at the opening of her new business, Tom grabs the microphone off her and reveals to the guests that she stole his money. Tom disowns Cindy and moves back in with the Osbornes.

In August 2018, Tom is horrified when he discovers that the Cunninghams' lodger, Milo Entwistle (Nathan Morris), is responsible for the car accident that killed his parents. After Milo tries to kill Cindy, Tom confronts him over the crash and Milo tries to apologise. Milo saves Tom by being crushed by a car but ends up getting crushed himself. The next day, Tom trashes Milo's room and later Mandy comforts him. After a heart to heart with Liberty Savage (Jessamy Stoddart), Tom decides to go visit Milo in hospital where he is paralysed. Milo apologises and Tom forgives him before he is taken to a different hospital.

Tom was most recently in a polyamorous relationship with Peri and Harley Frater (Mollie Lambert). In 2020, Tom marries Yasmine during the COVID-19 pandemic. Tom and Cindy flee the village in August 2024 after finding out that Cindy's husband Dave Chen-Williams (Dominic Power) lived a double life as a notorious gangland figure called "Blue". In July 2025, it is revealed that Tom is in prison. He later finds out that Clare is alive and offers to help police officer Donny Clark (Louis Emerick) take her down.

== Reception ==
For his portrayal of Tom, Hollins was nominated for "Best Young Actor" at the 2004 Inside Soap Awards. Ruth Deller of entertainment website Lowculture included Tom in one of her monthly columns featuring popular and unpopular soap opera characters. Criticising Tom she states: "For a little while, it seemed as though the Birdseye Botherer had disappeared from the planet, but no, he's back to taunt us, this time with his underage drinking and the overreaction to it. He's been nine for about two years now, and still acts like a toddler. Still, I suppose he won’t need to grow up much given the general IQ of the male populace of Hollyoaks." The character was voted 'Soaps Greatest Ever Child' in a 2009 Inside Soap poll and has been nominated for several awards at The British Soap Awards and Inside Soap Awards. At the 2012 Inside Soap Awards Hollins was nominated for "Best Young Actor" and has won the award in 2005, 2006 and 2008. Hollins won "Best Young Performance" at the 2006 and 2014 British Soap Awards. In 2014, Tina Campbell from Metro called Tom and Peri the soap's "cutest couple" following their first kiss. In 2017, Daniel Kilkelly called Tom "Hollyoaks' unluckiest teen".
