= Innuendo Studios =

American YouTuber (born 1984)

Ian Danskin
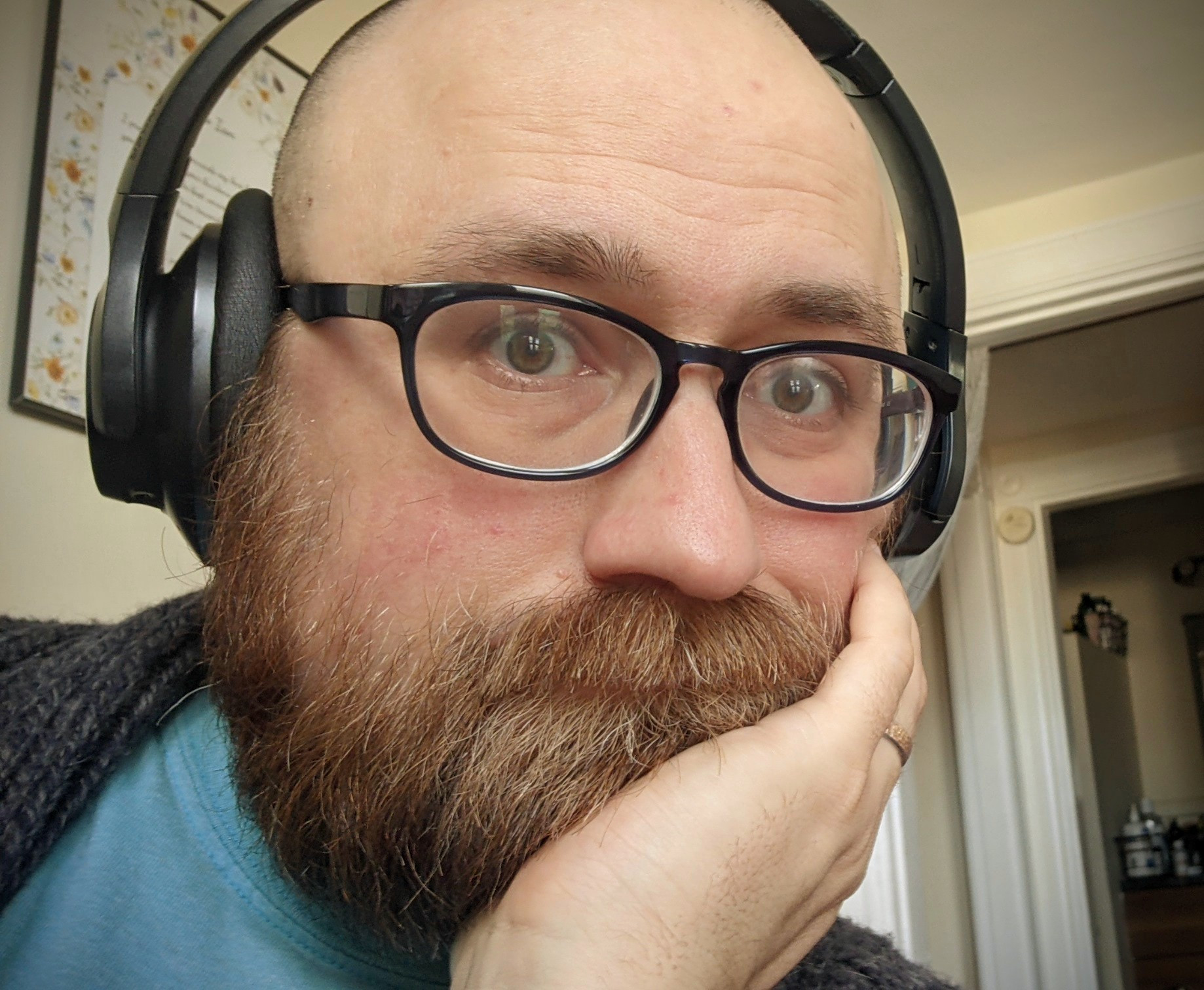
- Danskin in 2025
- Born: January 5, 1984 (age 42)
- Education: Massachusetts College of Art and Design

YouTube information
- Channel: Innuendo Studios
- Years active: 2015–present
- Subscribers: 545 thousand
- Views: 53.7 million
- Last updated: August 27, 2026
- Website: innuendostudios.com

Ian Danskin (born January 5, 1984) is an American YouTuber, whose YouTube channel Innuendo Studios discusses politics from a left-wing perspective. He is primarily known for "The Alt-Right Playbook" series of videos. The channel has been described as part of "BreadTube", an informal group of left-wing YouTube channels.

== Life and career ==
Danskin was born on January 5, 1984. He gained a Bachelor of Fine Arts in Interrelated Media at Massachusetts College of Art and Design.

The first "Alt-Right Playbook" episode was released in October 2017. Since then, the series has focused on examining and dismantling the online culture of the alt-right and "the rhetorical strategies [it] uses to legitimize itself and gain power." It uses drawings of simple figures on a grey background to illustrate its ideas.

Danskin has also discussed the Gamergate harassment campaign and the techniques used by Gamergate members to recruit people into their movement.

Daniel Schindel of Polygon listed Danskin's video "Lady Eboshi is Wrong" as one of the best video essays of 2018. (Note: Note: The video is no longer available on YouTube and can be found at: Danskin, Ian (August 31, 2019). Lady Eboshi is Wrong. Vimeo.) Julie Muncy of Gizmodo lauded Danskin's video series about the 2015 post-apocalyptic action movie Mad Max: Fury Road. His video on Phil Fish covered the celebrity status of game developers and led Markus "Notch" Persson, creator of Minecraft, to sell the game to Microsoft.
