= Peri Lomax =

Fictional character from Hollyoaks

- Hollyoaks character
- Portrayed by: Ruby O'Donnell
- Duration: 2013–2025
- First appearance: 4 October 2013
- Last appearance: 22 October 2025
- Introduced by: Bryan Kirkwood
- Crossover appearances: Brookside (2025)
In-universe information
- Occupation: Student; Nurse
- Father: Cameron Campbell
- Mother: Leela Lomax
- Stepfather: Ziggy Roscoe; Joel Dexter
- Half-brothers: Daniel Lomax; Noah Dexter; Sid Sumner (foster)
- Half-sisters: Clara Dexter
- Husband: Abe Fielding (2025)
- Daughters: Steph Cunningham-Lomax
- Grandfathers: Danny Lomax
- Grandmothers: Sam Lomax
- Uncles: Lockie Campbell; Ste Hay
- Aunts: Tegan Lomax
- First cousins: Lucas Hay; Hannah Hay-O'Connor; Dee Dee Hutchinson; Leah Barnes (adoptive)
- Other relatives: Angela Brown; Courtney Campbell; Granny Campbell; Iona Campbell

Peri Lomax is a fictional character from the British Channel 4 soap opera Hollyoaks and is portrayed by Ruby O'Donnell. Peri made her first on-screen appearance in episode 3705, originally broadcast on 4 October 2013. After being introduced as the "sister" of pre-established longstanding character Ste Hay (Kieron Richardson) alongside her believed to be two sisters Leela Lomax (Kirsty-Leigh Porter) and Tegan Lomax (Jessica Ellis), the character was devised in a plot-twist meaning she was revealed to be the biological daughter of Leela who had conceived Peri at fourteen with childhood lover and serial killer Cameron Campbell (Cameron Moore) who later murdered her grandparents.

Peri was placed at the forefront of an issue-led based storyline in 2015 when the character began a high-profile teenage pregnancy storyline alongside Tom Cunningham (Ellis Hollins). The storyline resulted in the birth of Steph Cunningham-Lomax (Katie/Isabella Hibbert) in episode 4202, originally broadcast on 1 September 2015. Peri later forms romances with Harley Frater (Mollie Lambert) and Juliet Nightingale (Niamh Blackshaw). Peri is later a suspect in the "Who Killed Rayne?" (Jemma Donovan) whodunit storyline, where it was later revealed to be her boyfriend Romeo Nightingale (Owen Warner). Peri was killed off on 21 October 2025, in an unannounced departure, after being crushed by the chimney from The Love Boat caused by a plane crash which was flown by Jeremy Blake (Jeremy Sheffield). Peri made her final appearance as a corpse on 22 October 2025, and it was later revealed in an interview that O'Donnell made the decision to leave Hollyoaks to pursue other acting projects.

== Casting and creation ==
She made her first appearance on 4 October 2013. The character and O'Donnell's casting was announced on 17 September 2013. O'Donnell auditioned for the role of Peri and was invited back twice, before she learned she had got the part. Her mother commented "When we got the call I started crying and then we started jumping up and down in the kitchen. The more I see the scripts the more I think Ruby is quite similar to her character Peri and I think she's fitted in well with the family." O'Donnell began filming during the summer months.

Peri is the youngest member of the Lomax family, which consists of parents Danny (Stephen Billington) and Sam (Lizzie Roper) and siblings Tegan (Jessica Ellis) and Leela (Kirsty-Leigh Porter). Describing Peri, a writer for the show's official website commented "Don your shades, ladies and gents – 'cos this girl is sunshine all year round! As the youngest of the Lomaxes, Peri should be making mistakes left, right and centre, but – in actual fact – she's usually the only voice of reason in her family." They observed that she has "the wisdom of seven Yodas" and is happy to give out advice to her family and friends. In an article published by Metro, it was confirmed that Peri was named after Doctor Who character Peri Brown.

== Development ==
=== True parentage ===
It is revealed in August 2014 that Peri's sister Leela is her biological mother. Peri finds out and initially does not forgive Leela, but later does. O'Donnell spoke to Digital Spy after the reveal that Leela was her mother, "For Peri's character, it's completely the wrong thing to do because it's just shocked her and made her hate [Leela] even more." O'Donnell also said, "Peri's going to obviously be really confused, because she doesn't understand how they've lied to her and why they've lied to her. Peri's meant to be very nice and sweet and her life's meant to be very simple, but obviously not!" Kirsty-Leigh Porter (Leela Lomax) said, "I think, if anything, Leela thinks she's done kind of a good thing by going, 'Right, there you go, I'm your mum and it's out there in the open'" Leela had first told Sienna Blake (Anna Passey) about Peri's true parentage. Porter had mentioned that she knew the truth when she got the role. In June 2014, Peri's biological father and Leela's childhood lover, Cameron Campbell (Cameron Moore), was introduced to the serial. In August 2014, after the deaths of Sam and Danny, Peri bought drugs on a night out with Nico. Cameron tried to stop her.

=== Teenage pregnancy ===
In November 2014, it was announced that Peri was to have a teen pregnancy storyline with Tom Cunningham. The storyline was devised as an effort to promote safe sex. This storyline along with Ste's HIV plot was a part of the safe sex for 2015 said Bryan Kirkwood. Hollyoaks are working with charity Brook during the storyline. O'Donnell has said, "Some of the scenes have been hard to tackle because I am still quite young and I've had to do a lot of research for them. I am younger than Peri, as she is just turning 15 and I'm only 14 myself. So I've done the research to help with my performances and to find out how teenagers actually do react in these situations." She also said, "When I was first told about the story, I was nervous and didn't know what to expect, but then I had a lot of meetings about it with the show's executive producer Bryan Kirkwood, the storyliners and the other producers. They explained it to me and made me feel a lot more comfortable about it. Now I've got into it, I'm very excited about the storyline and I'm really enjoying doing it."

During the storyline, Tom proposed to Peri and revealed to the whole school and town that she was pregnant to Leela, Ziggy and Tegan's surprise. Also during the storyline, Leela called cousin Angela (Adele Silva) as a candidate to adopt the baby.
Peri gave birth to her daughter on 1 September 2015.

=== Relationship with Juliet Nightingale ===
In December 2019, it was confirmed that a relationship would develop between Juliet and Peri. Blackshaw, who portrays Juliet, stated that at the point of filming their first kissing scene together, she did not know the exact details of how the pair got together, but she knew that a relationship between them would eventually develop. She added that she loves working with O'Donnell and that the pair enjoy filming together. O'Donnell echoed Blackshaw's comments, stating that she loves their storyline and that the pair had both seen fan accounts for Peri and Juliet. After the pair were involved in a second kissing scene, Digital Spy confirmed that their relationship will continue to develop. The couple have since been referred to by the portmanteau 'Jeri'.

Following Juliet being imprisoned for her involvement in a county lines drug trafficking ring, Blackshaw stated that "it's the biggest relief in the world" for her character to be reunited with Peri after her release. She joked that the pair "can't even walk casually" when they see each other and run to one another. She added: "it's been a long, long wait, and when it happens, it was just a million times better than what she imagined it would be". Blackshaw explained that having Peri waiting for her helped to "motivate her and push her through" was a beneficial aspect for her character. She also hoped that their relationship would be long-term. Months afterwards, Peri becomes suspicious of Juliet receiving texts from an unknown number. O'Donnell said that this is due to their relationship still being new and their trust being slowly built. She revealed that both herself and Blackshaw were "cheering for their characters' romance to live on" since they are best friends in real life. O'Donnell also said that while she does not know what future storylines could possibly involve, she could see Juliet and Peri being a long-term couple.

== Storylines ==
Peri arrives with mother Sam (Lizzie Roper) to surprise her father, Danny (Stephen Billington). Her sisters, Leela (Kirsty-Leigh Porter) and Tegan (Jessica Ellis), soon join them and Tegan gives birth to her daughter, Rose. Peri is shocked to learn she has a half-brother, Ste Hay (Kieron Richardson). Peri also makes friends with Tom Cunningham (Ellis Hollins). While confronting her father, Peri faints and falls down the stairs in the village, and is then rushed to hospital, where she is diagnosed with a brain tumour. Just before her operation, Tom sneaks her out and they kiss. Peri then faints again and Tom returns her to hospital where her operation is successful. Peri bonds with Sienna Blake (Anna Passey), who assumes Peri is her long-lost daughter after finding out that Peri is adopted and she has the same birthday as her daughter. However, Leela reveals to Sienna in confidence that she is Peri's biological mother and Sienna agrees not to tell Peri. Peri gets drunk with a bottle of wine and is found by her biological father, Cameron Campbell (Cameron Moore). He takes her home and Sam and Danny panic and try to leave quicker, scared that Leela and Cameron will tell Peri the truth. Peri says emotional goodbyes to Tom and Leela but just as they are about to leave, Leela comes racing to the car, having been told by Cameron that Peri confided in him about not wanting to leave. This causes an argument between Leela, Cameron and Sam and Danny, with Leela telling Peri that she and Cameron are her biological parents. Peri runs away and is found by Tegan. They then ring Sam and Danny to pick them up so they can go to New Zealand as planned. However, just moments after they phone, Sam and Danny are killed. This devastates Peri, but after Sam and Danny's funeral, Peri starts to bond with Leela and Cameron, establishing parent-child relationships.

Peri loses her virginity to Tom. The day before her birthday, Peri wishes that she could spend time with her father so Dylan Jenkins (James Fletcher) suggests that he, Peri and Nico Blake (Persephone Swales-Dawson) visit him. She collapses in Dylan's arms and he takes her to hospital where she learns that she is pregnant. Tom sees them and thinks she is cheating on him. When Tom confronts Peri, she tells him that she is pregnant, leaving Tom speechless. On her 15th birthday, she is thrown a surprise birthday party with Nico, who shares her birthday. She goes to the hospital with Tom and finds out that she is 10 weeks pregnant. Celine McQueen (Sarah George) tells her she can have an abortion and Peri leaves. Peri considers an abortion but during the school play, Tom proposes and she runs home in tears after Leela discovers that her daughter is pregnant. Leela and Peri talk about the possibilities of having a baby so young and Peri decides not to have an abortion, choosing instead to have the baby adopted. She agrees to let Angela Brown (Adele Silva) and her husband Mark (Ben Faulks) adopt the baby. Frankie Osborne (Helen Pearson), Tom's adoptive mother, knows how much Tom wants to be a father and suggests to Peri that the baby live with them but Peri refuses since she does not want to be close to the baby.

When Tom becomes close to his foster sister Jade Albright (Kassius Nelson), Peri becomes jealous and starts bullying Jade, alongside Nico. Peri makes advances towards Jade's boyfriend Alfie Nightingale (Richard Linnell) as revenge against Jade. As Jade goes up to the school's assembly, Nico pulls her wig off, leaving her humiliated. Peri reports Nico to headteacher Sally St. Claire (Annie Wallace), believing the wig stunt was a step too far, and Nico is expelled. Nico discovers that Peri told on her and as revenge, persuades her to go on a camping trip with her in the woods. In the woods, Nico locks them up is an abandoned bunker deep within the forest and when Peri realises that they are trapped, she screams for help. When Peri bangs on the door for help, the ceiling collapses on her, knocking her unconscious. She awakens, but passes out again from dehydration. Peri and Nico are later found and are taken to hospital. Cameron discovers that Nico held Peri hostage in the bunker, and so at the village's funfair, he sets fire to a wooden maze, where Nico and Sienna become trapped.

On her wedding day to Cameron, Leela gives birth to Peri's half-brother, Daniel. There, it is revealed that Daniel is mixed race, meaning that Cameron is not his father, and he furiously leaves the village. Peri begins meeting with Cameron in secret, helping his reconcile with Leela by organizing a holiday in a cabin in the woods. However, they find the corpse of Celine McQueen (Sarah George), Cameron's ex-girlfriend, floating in the lake. Cameron then locks Peri and Leela in the cabin and threatens to kill them all by setting the building on fire. After being imprisoned, Cameron begins blackmailing Lisa Loveday (Rachel Adedeji), forcing her to convince Peri to visit him in prison, however Peri expresses her hatred towards her father before leaving. While Lily Drinkwell (Lauren McQueen) is in hospital after collapsing, Peri has sex with Lily's boyfriend Prince McQueen (Malique Thompson-Dwyer). She takes a pregnancy test and it comes back positive, making Prince the father. Peri later discovers she isn't pregnant, that the test was faulty. Diane O'Connor (Alex Fletcher) discovers that Peri is not pregnant but persuades Peri to keep lying so that it will keep Lily away from Prince. Peri agrees to follow Diane's plan. Still believing her to be pregnant, Prince invites Peri to move in with him which she accepts. Peri fakes photos of a baby scan, which Prince's mother Goldie (Chelsee Healey) figures out are fake. She confronts her and Peri admits the truth. She then boards a train and leaves the village. Mandy Richardson (Sarah Jayne Dunn) discovers Peri on CCTV and when Peri returns to the village, it is revealed she is homeless. A girl called Harley Frater (Mollie Lambert) arrives in the village with information about Peri; Leela lets her stay but she robs her purse and runs away.

After 71 days of being homeless, Peri returns home, delighting Leela. Harley arrives and Peri announces that Harley is staying with them but Leela refuses. Peri tells her that if Harley goes then she goes so Leela allows her to stay. Leela finds it hard to reconnect with Peri with Harley around. Peri tells Harley that she appreciates her help and Harley kisses her. Peri later kisses Harley but then pulls away, leaving Harley upset. Peri apologises to Harley for leading her on and plans her birthday party. Peri finds it hard to get people to attend so she pays them. Nico hears that Peri has a new best friend so comes to the party. Since it is a fancy dress party, nobody recognises her. While playing spin the bottle, Harley kisses Hunter making Peri jealous. She confronts Harley which is witnessed by Nico. When Harley is alone outside, Nico confronts her and tries to push her down the steps but Peri interrupts her. Afterwards, Peri and Harley start a relationship. Nico then spies on Peri and Harley. When they are alone inside the garage, Nico comes in and knocks Harley out before tying them up. Nico tries to convince Peri to run away with her and their baby, but Peri reminds her of the bad things they did together. They are eventually saved by Damon Kinsella (Jacob Roberts) and Dirk Savage (David Kennedy) and Harley is rushed to hospital.

Peri begins a secret relationship with Jordan Price (Connor Calland) and is shocked to find drugs in his bag. She confronts him, and he explains that he occasionally takes drugs, having dealt them when he was younger. Juliet Nightingale (Niamh Blackshaw), the girlfriend of Peri's adoptive brother Sid Sumner (Billy Price), explains to Peri that Jordan is not a nice person and is associated with bad people, but she does not listen. Juliet and Peri kiss, and Juliet later confesses to Peri that she is a lesbian and that she likes Peri romantically. Peri explains that she sees her as a little sister, and turns her down. Jordan is later arrested when he is found with a bag of drugs and Peri expresses her disgust with their relationship, which she ends. Peri then gets closer to Juliet and develops an attraction to her. Juliet informs Peri that Jordan and his boss Victor Brothers (Benjamin O'Mahoney) groomed her and Sid into selling drugs as part of a county lines drug trafficking operation. Peri is disgusted with Juliet for being involved with drugs. Juliet asks Peri if they could be a couple if she got out of the county lines gang, which Peri says yes to. Juliet becomes fixated on exposing Jordan and Victor, and when Victor learns of her plans, he threatens to kill one of Juliet's loved ones. She rushes to Peri to admit that she loves her and Peri confirms that she loves Juliet too. Juliet then hands herself into the police and Peri confirms that she will wait for her until her release. After Juliet's release from prison, the pair move in together. Unbeknownst to Peri and Juliet, landlord Fergus Collins (Robert Beck) installs a secret camera in their bedroom, making them famous camgirls.

== Reception ==
O'Donnell has been nominated three times at the Inside Soap Awards for Best Young Actor in 2014, 2015 and again in 2017. After her nominations, the Warrington Guardian described O'Donnell as a "starlet" for her role of Peri. O'Donnell has also been nominated for Best On-Screen Partnership with Ellis Hollins at the 2015 British Soap Awards. At the same award ceremony, O'Donnell was also nominated for Best Young Performance. She subsequently won Best Young Performance at the 2016 British Soap Awards. For her onscreen relationship with Juliet, both O'Donnell and Blackshaw were nominated for Best Soap Partnership at the I Talk Telly Awards. In 2014, Tina Campbell from Metro called Tom and Peri the soap's "cutest couple" following their first kiss. Peri's death storyline was nominated in the "Saddest Soap Moment" category at the 2025 Digital Spy Reader Awards.
