= Peter Ash =

English actor (born 1985)

- Born: 4 February 1985 (age 41); Marsden, West Yorkshire
- Occupation: Actor
- Years active: 2002–present
- Known for: Footballers' Wives (2003–06); Coronation Street (2018–24)
- Children: 1
- Relatives: William Ash (second cousin)

Peter Ash (born 4 February 1985) is an English actor from Moston, Greater Manchester, who has starred in British television series such as Casualty, Footballers' Wives, Hollyoaks, and Coronation Street.

== Early life ==
Ash attended St Matthew's RC High School in Moston and then Xaverian College in Rusholme, Manchester.

He first started acting in school plays and with local amateur theatre groups.

== Career ==
His first TV acting role was in Blue Murder in 2003, which helped him land a bigger role in Casualty, playing Keith Jowell in six episodes.

He was 18 when he started playing Darius Fry in Footballers' Wives, between 2003 and 2006.

In 2005, he was in Street Trilogy at Warwick Arts Centre in Coventry.

He was a participant in the 2013–2015 UK tour of War Horse, at The Lowry theatre.

He has had guest appearances in The Street and The Royal.

In 2018, he played Harley Frater's (Mollie Lambert) acquaintance Ron in the Channel 4 soap opera Hollyoaks. Reflecting on his stint on the soap, Ash told Inside Soap in 2019, "That was great fun, I had a really nice little part – even though I was playing a horrible person! My character was taking advantage of homeless girl Harley Frater and supplying her drugs, so he wasn't very nice. But the Hollyoaks team was really lovely. I worked a lot alongside Mollie Lambert, who played Harley, and she was absolutely cracking."

In 2018, Ash appeared in Coronation Street, briefly portraying the character Paul Foreman, David Platt's (Jack P. Shepherd) cellmate in Highfield Prison. In 2019, he returned to Coronation Street. Paul was later revealed to be the estranged twin brother of Gemma Winter (Dolly-Rose Campbell). He won 2020 National Television Award for Best Newcomer.

== Personal life ==
He is a second cousin of fellow actor William Ash. In 2014, he was living in Mossley.

== Filmography ==
=== Film ===
Year	Title	Role
2005	Chicken Tikka Masala	Jack
2009	A Drop of the Pure	Young Howard
2012	Broken Hearts	Callum Cook
2016	Locust (Short)	Ellipsis
2017	Strangeways Here We Come	Bud

=== Television ===
Year	Title	Role	Notes
2003	Casualty	Keith Jowell	TV series, 6 episodes
2003	Blue Murder	Colin	TV series, 2 episodes
2003–2006	Footballers' Wives	Darius Fry	Regular role, 21 episodes
2006	Footballers' Wives: Extra Time	Darius Fry	TV series, 6 episodes
2008	The Royal	John Stemford	TV series, 1 episode
2009	The Street	Ross	TV series, 1 episode
2012	White Van Man	Ben	TV series, 1 episode
2018	Hollyoaks	Ron	4 episodes
2018–2024	Coronation Street	Paul Foreman	Regular role
2026	The Teacher	Sebastian Blake	TV series, 4 episodes
