= Ruby O'Donnell =

English actress (born 2000)

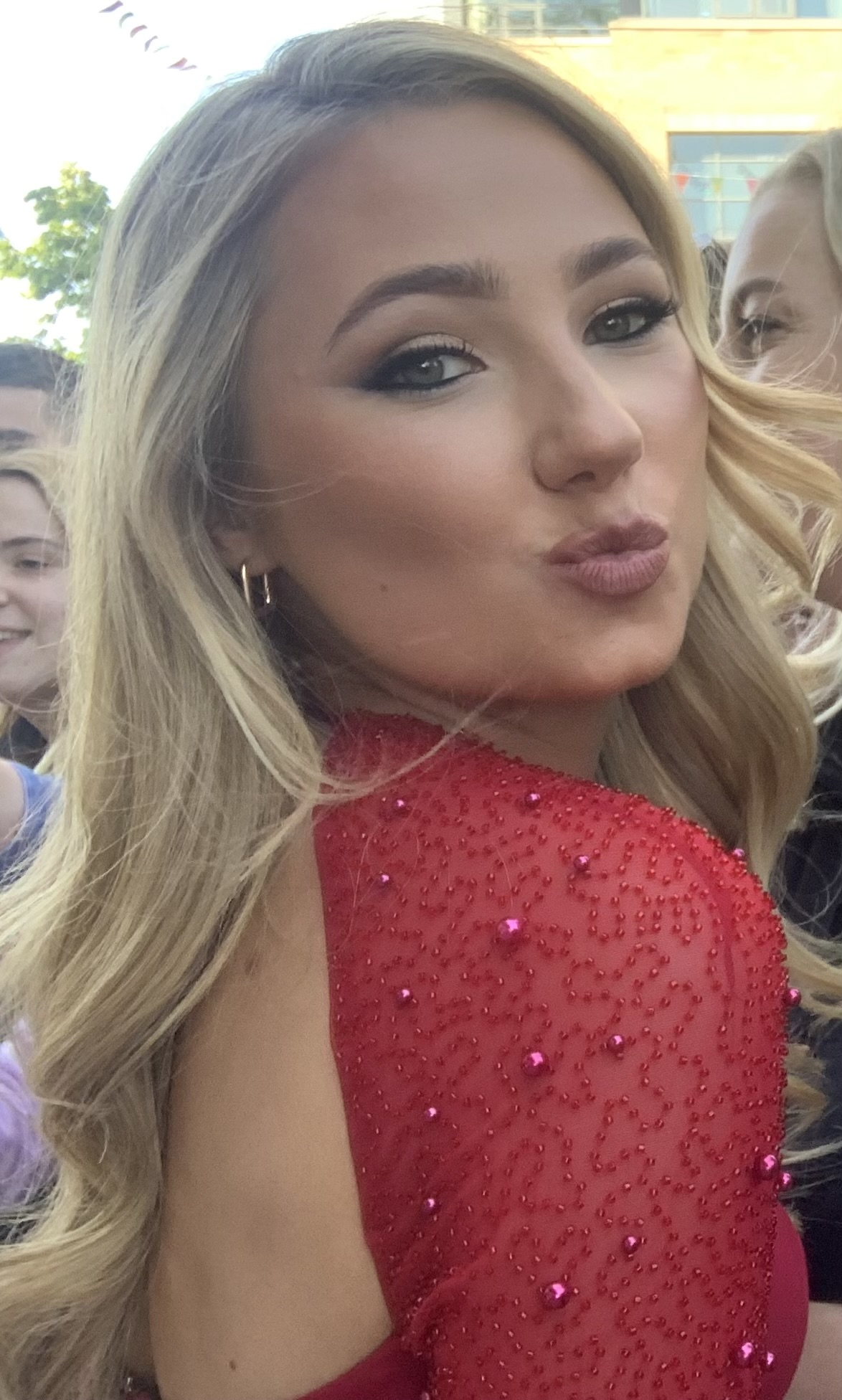
- O'Donnell in 2023
- Born: Ruby Victoria O'Donnell; 26 October 2000 (age 25); Warrington, England
- Occupation: Actress
- Years active: 2013–present
- Television: Hollyoaks

Ruby Victoria O'Donnell (born 26 October 2000) is an English actress. She portrayed the role of Peri Lomax in the Channel 4 soap opera Hollyoaks from 2013 to 2025. For her role as Peri, she won the award for Best Young Performance at the 2016 British Soap Awards.

== Early and personal life ==
O'Donnell was born in Warrington and grew up in Appleton. She has two brothers. She attended Grappenhall Heys Primary School and then Bridgewater High School. She took acting classes at Little Stars Stage School. From 2019 to 2023, O'Donnell was in a relationship with professional rugby player Sam Halsall. In July 2024, O'Donnell confirmed that she was dating her Hollyoaks co-star Nathaniel Dass.

== Career ==
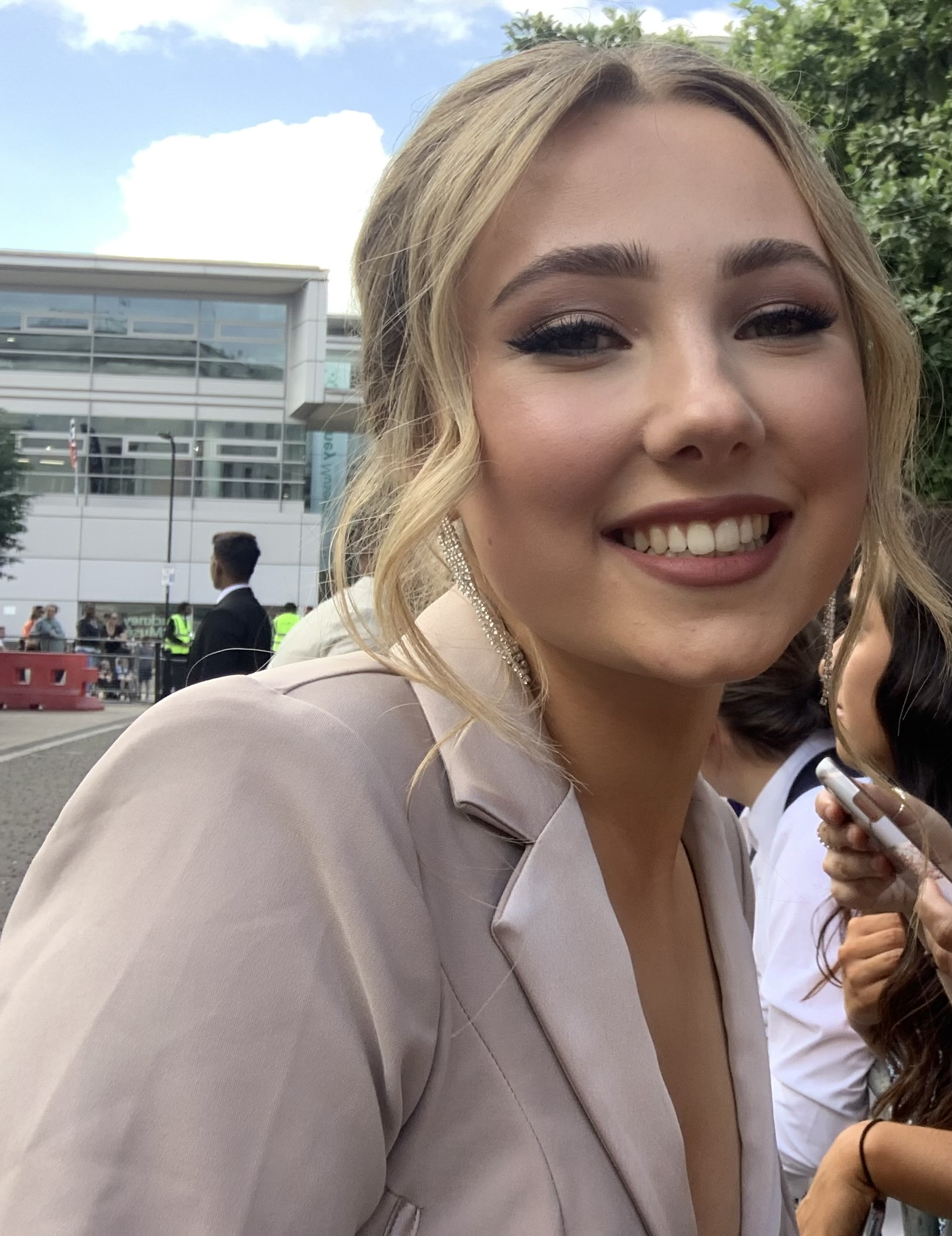
O'Donnell at the 2022 British Soap Awards.

In September 2013, it was announced that O'Donnell had been cast in Hollyoaks as Peri Lomax, the youngest child of the newly established Lomax family. Of the family's arrival, executive producer Bryan Kirkwood commented: "I was conscious of the fact that Ste was languishing on his own with no family around him. I'm eager to bring in a strong female force." On 23 November 2014, it was announced that O'Donnell's character would be involved in a teen pregnancy storyline alongside character Tom Cunningham (Ellis Hollins). The storyline was devised as an effort to promote safe sex. On the storyline, O'Donnell said "Some of the scenes have been hard to tackle because I am still quite young and I've had to do a lot of research for them. I am younger than Peri, as she is just turning 15 and I'm only 14 myself. So I’ve done the research to help with my performances and to find out how teenagers actually do react in these situations." She also said, "When I was first told about the story, I was nervous and didn’t know what to expect, but then I had a lot of meetings about it with the show’s executive producer Bryan Kirkwood, the storyliners and the other producers. They explained it to me and made me feel a lot more comfortable about it. Now I've got into it, I'm very excited about the storyline and I'm really enjoying doing it."

For her role as Peri, O'Donnell has been nominated twice in the Inside Soap Awards in 2014 and 2015. In August 2017, O'Donnell was longlisted for Best Young Actor at the Inside Soap Awards, however she did not progress to the shortlist. O'Donnell has also been nominated for Best On-Screen Partnership with Hollins, and was also nominated for Best Young Performance in 2015 and 2016, the latter of which she won. O'Donnell's character has since developed a relationship with Juliet Nightingale (Niamh Blackshaw), for which the pair received a nomination for Best Soap Partnership at the I Talk Telly Awards. In 2025, after 12 years in the role, O'Donnell made the decision to leave Hollyoaks to pursue other projects. Her character was killed off in a plane crash as part of the soap's 30th anniversary.

== Filmography ==
Year	Title	Role	Notes
2013–2025	Hollyoaks	Peri Lomax	Regular role
2014	Hollyoaks: Tom's Life	Peri Lomax	Main role
2020	Come Dine with Me	Herself	Hollyoaks special

== Awards and nominations ==
Year	Organisation	Award	Work	Result
2014	Inside Soap Awards	Best Young Actor	Peri Lomax in Hollyoaks	Nominated
2015	Inside Soap Awards	Best Young Actor	Peri Lomax in Hollyoaks	Nominated
2015	British Soap Awards	Best Young Performance	Peri Lomax in Hollyoaks	Nominated
2015	British Soap Awards	Best On-Screen Partnership (with Ellis Hollins)	Peri Lomax and Tom Cunningham in Hollyoaks	Nominated
2016	British Soap Awards	Best Young Performer	Peri Lomax in Hollyoaks	Won
2017	Inside Soap Awards	Best Young Actor	Peri Lomax in Hollyoaks	Nominated
2018	Inside Soap Awards	Best Young Actor	Peri Lomax in Hollyoaks	Nominated
2021	I Talk Telly Awards	Best Soap Partnership (with Niamh Blackshaw)	Peri Lomax and Juliet Nightingale in Hollyoaks	Nominated
2023	Inside Soap Awards	Best Partnership (with Blackshaw)	Peri Lomax and Juliet Nightingale in Hollyoaks	Nominated
