= List of Hollyoaks characters introduced in 2026 =

Hollyoaks is a British soap opera that first aired on 23 October 1995. The following characters will make their debut in 2026. Jenson Cole (Ryan Clayton), a love interest for Mercedes McQueen (Jennifer Metcalfe) later found out to be Warren Fox’s half brother, was the first new character to be announced in 2026. April saw the arrival of a new Keane family unit, which consists of Jonah (Matthew Wolfenden), the husband of Beth Keane (Rebecca Ryan), the estranged daughter of Jack Osborne (Jimmy McKenna) who returned to the soap, his son Caleb (Lewis Walton) and Beth's son Maddox (Sam Meyer). Abigail (Brooke Vincent), the counsellor of Dee Dee Hutchinson (Chloe Atkinson) is set to appear later in the year. Additionally, several other characters appear throughout the year.

== Jenson Cole ==
Jenson Cole
- Hollyoaks character
- Portrayed by: Ryan Clayton
- First appearance: Episode 6672; 27 January 2026
- Introduced by: Hannah Cheers
In-universe information
- Occupation: Loan Shark
- Half-brothers: Warren Fox
- Nephews: Joel Dexter; Sebastian Blake
- Nieces: Sophie Blake; Ella Richardson; Maria-Gabriella Fox-McQueen

Jenson Cole, played by Ryan Clayton, will make his first appearance in early 2026. The character and casting was announced on 5 January 2026. He is introduced as a love interest for established character Mercedes McQueen (Jennifer Metcalfe), who he meets at a rehabilitation facility. The Hollyoaks 2026 New Year trailer showed a potential attraction between Mercedes and Jenson, as well as Jenson confronting established character Tim O'Leary (Philip Olivier) for using the identity of Warren Fox (Jamie Lomas). Clayton had previously appeared in another soap opera, Coronation Street. Dan Laurie from RSVP Live opined that Jenson had "tense scenes" with Tim in the trailer.

On 18 January 2026, Clayton confirmed his character's dark side in an exclusive interview. Clayton described his character: "He's very cunning and slippery, I would say! He's like a sly little fox..." When asked if he saw Jenson as a villain Ryan said: "It's definitely more complicated, because he is a complex character with a past to be explored. I think the writers are playing around with that idea of: is he a good guy or is he a bad guy? It's constantly being pushed and twisted..." Clayton was also asked if any details were given to him regarding Jenson, which he responded: "Not everything. As always with continuing dramas, they're developing the story. It's an ongoing thing, so you're always learning new things about your character...I was fortunate, as we all had a sit-down conversation before I started, where we went through some ideas and explored Jenson's backstory. It was good to see the time and thought that's clearly been put into the storyline." After being asked about his character being in rehab, Clayton explained: "Well, Jenson's reasons for being in rehab in the first place are up for debate! He learns about Warren and Mercedes' relationship and uses that as a chance to pursue his plans. The audience will be left to question whether Jenson has genuine feelings for Mercedes or not. You just never know what's real with him or what's not. Is it always an ulterior motive? That's what's made him so fun to play so far."

Clayton described his audition process: "Hollyoaks got in contact and asked if I would be interested in joining the show. I was thinking that it was probably going to be in the new year, but the turnaround was very quick and I started filming late last year. That's part of what made it so attractive, I guess! It was straight away and it wasn't playing that waiting game of it potentially coming to fruition." He also discussed his first scenes: "Jenson's way into the village is through Tinhead (Philip Olivier), who's come to him for money. Tinhead is pretending that he's Warren, but Jenson has realised that he's not telling the truth. He's got leverage on Tinhead now and he uses that against him, to get Tinhead to do his dirty work! He's very manipulative and he knows how to push people's buttons. He's street smart and wouldn't go into a fight unless he had the upper hand – or knew he could find the upper hand!" When asked if he was excited about playing another soap role, he said: "I was, but it always comes down to character first. If you're going to be playing a character for a while, you want something that you can sink your teeth into. I'm definitely doing that with Jenson!" Clayton also confirmed there would be long-term plans for his character: "I'd say just expect the unexpected with Jenson! He's always working on something and constantly plotting." But when asked if he was sticking around, Clayton said: "There's potential for it, definitely!"

== Jonah Keane ==
Jonah Keane
- Hollyoaks character
- Portrayed by: Matthew Wolfenden
- First appearance: Episode 6704; 13 April 2026
- Introduced by: Hannah Cheers
In-universe information
- Wife: Bethany Cunningham
- Sons: Caleb Keane
- Stepsons: Maddox Keane (adoptive)

Jonah Keane, portrayed by Matthew Wolfenden, is the husband of Bethany Cunningham (Rebecca Ryan), who has returned to Hollyoaks to be closer to her family. His casting was officially announced on 11 March 2026 after rumours of his casting began circulating the previous month. They first appeared on 13 April 2026, alongside his son, Caleb (Lewis Walton). Wolfenden previously played series regular David Metcalfe in ITV soap opera Emmerdale between 2006 and 2023. Alongside the family's casting, official photos of the family were released by Channel 4 which show the family loading up a van playfully before they relocate to Chester.

Wolfenden spoke about his casting: "I'm so excited to finally share that I'm joining Hollyoaks as part of a brand-new family arriving in the village." He added: "It's an absolute privilege to step into this world and be part of something so iconic. From the moment I read the scripts, I knew this was going to be something special. I can't wait for the audience to meet them and see how they turn a few heads along the way… it's going to be a ride, buckle up." Wolfenden also teased there would be special episodes ahead.

== Caleb Keane ==
Caleb Keane
- Hollyoaks character
- Portrayed by: Lewis Walton
- First appearance: Episode 6704; 13 April 2026
- Introduced by: Hannah Cheers
In-universe information
- Father: Jonah Keane
- Stepmother: Bethany Cunningham
- Half-brothers: Maddox Keane (adoptive)

Caleb Keane, portrayed by Walton, is the son of Jonah Keane (Wolfenden) who first appeared on 13 April 2026 when he, Jonah and stepmother Bethany Cunningham (Ryan) moved to Hollyoaks to be closer to her family. His casting was announced on 11 March 2026 alongside his parents. Alongside the family's casting, cast photos of the family were released by Channel 4 which show the family loading up a van playfully before they relocate to Chester. These included a photo of Walton's character holding a basketball, a passion he shares with his dad. Walton previously starred alongside Brook Debio, who plays Ant Hutchinson, in a flashback episode of ITV soap opera Coronation Street he and Debio portrayed younger versions of series regulars Mick Michaelis (Joe Layton) and Kit Green respectively.

Walton spoke about his casting: "I'm thrilled to be joining the Hollyoaks cast. My character is charismatic, sporty and someone who's always been the fun, positive presence in the room," Walton said. "He's incredibly close to his family and determined to follow in his dad's footsteps, while chasing big ambitions of his own, especially when it comes to sport. But life doesn't always go to plan, and an unexpected challenge will force him to dig deeper than ever before…"

== Maddox Keane ==
Maddox Keane
- Hollyoaks character
- Portrayed by: Sam Meyer
- First appearance: Episode 6710; 27 April 2026
- Introduced by: Hannah Cheers
In-universe information
- Mother: Cindy Cunningham
- Adoptive mother: Bethany Cunningham
- Stepfather: Jonah Keane (adoptive)
- Half-brothers: Alfie Nightingale; Hilton Cunningham; Caleb Keane (adoptive)
- Half-sisters: Holly Cunningham
- Grandfathers: Gordon Cunningham; Jack Osborne (adoptive)
- Grandmothers: Angela Cunningham; Dawn Cunningham (adoptive)
- Uncles: Max Cunningham; Tom Cunningham; Darren Osborne (adoptive)
- Aunts: Dawn Cunningham; Jude Cunningham; Ruth Osborne (adoptive)
- First cousins: Steph Cunningham-Lomax; JJ Osborne (adoptive); Frankie Osborne (adoptive); Oscar Osborne (adoptive); Charlie Dean (adoptive)

Maddox Keane, portrayed by Sam Meyer, is the son of Jonah Keane (Wolfenden) and Bethany Cunningham (Ryan). His casting was announced on 12 March 2026, a day after the castings of the other three members of the family were announced. Upon casting, he was described to be a "secret" member of the Keanes, but presumed to be a sibling to Walton's character, Caleb Keane. Meyer nearly landed a place in Simon Cowell's boyband December 10 on his Netflix series The Next Act, whose Instagram account had previously teased his upcoming appearance in the Channel 4 soap opera with a post with the caption: "Who else is in this family? Anyone we know?"

Meyer spoke about his casting: "I am absolutely buzzing to say that I am joining the cast of Hollyoaks. He's a cool kid with a lot of golden retriever-like energy, he loves his fashion and he's quite smart for his age. Look out for this new kid in the village!" He continued: "I am happy that I am joining the cast as part of a brand-new family as well and I can't wait to see what trouble we all get into together…"

== Abigail Matthews ==
Abigail Matthews
- Hollyoaks character
- Portrayed by: Brooke Vincent
- First appearance: Episode 6741; 7 July 2026
- Introduced by: Hannah Cheers
In-universe information
- Occupation: Drug Counsellor; Drama Teacher

Abigail Matthews, portrayed by Brooke Vincent, is due to debut in 2026. Vincent's casting was announced on 22 April 2026. Vincent posted about her casting on Instagram with some photos of herself next to the Hollyoaks village sign: "So excited to be joining the cast of Hollyoaks for such a powerful storyline!! I am so grateful for this opportunity to be back on screen playing a brand new character plus my family will be happy I'm back in a full time job Haha." Initially, her character's name wasn't revealed until 13 May 2026, when producer Hannah Cheers revealed more details, including the fact that Abigail isn't related to anyone already in the village. Vincent is known for previously playing series regular Sophie Webster in ITV1 soap opera Coronation Street between 2004 and 2019. Some of her former co-stars praised her Hollyoaks casting, including Sue Devaney, who plays her former on-screen aunty, Debbie Webster who posted: "Love this our Brooke! You’ll be fabulous as ever! Love yer Auntie Debbie." Vincent's real-life cousin and former Coronation Street co-star, Ellie Leach also expressed her support by adding: "Eeeeekkkk so excited." Metcalfe who plays Mercedes said that Vincent was "gunna love" being in Hollyoaks, whilst Nadine Mulkerrin who plays Cleo McQueen commented: "Yaaay".

Cheers revealed: "It’s going to be a very different role for her in a major story that will take hold over the summer." She continued: "Her character, Abigail, is not connected to anyone in the village." Cheers also revealed that Abigail would be a counsellor for Dee Dee Hutchinson (Chloe Atkinson), who ends up in a teen rehab faculty after turning to drugs to try and cope with the death of her mother, Diane Hutchinson (Alex Fletcher). She explained: "The story starts when Dee Dee, spiralling after Diane’s death, takes ketamine a couple of times. Tony Hutchinson (Nick Pickard) finds out and makes the rash decision to drive her to a teen rehab facility where she meets this counsellor, Abigail." She continued: "Dee Dee ends up escaping from rehab and Abigail follows her back to the village, then decides to stick around. Cheers also discussed Abigail's future in Hollyoaks including a career change away from the rehab faculty so she can stick around. She explained: "Abigail's a very dynamic presence, she’s cool and progressive and loves people. She makes friends easily and will end up being flatmates with someone in the village, and landing a job there."

== Xander Frost ==
Xander Frost
- Hollyoaks character
- Portrayed by: Indigo Kamal-Poole
- First appearance: Episode 6763; 26 August 2026
- Introduced by: Hannah Cheers
In-universe information
- Father: Martin Frost
- Sisters: Tara Frost

Xander Frost, portrayed by Indigo Kamal-Poole, is a "mystery man" who is due to arrive in the village. His casting was announced on 15 August 2026 and his arrival would see him being questioned by quarrelling Cindy Cunningham (Stephanie Waring) and Beth Keane (Rebecca Ryan). Kamal-Poole is a hard-of-hearing actor, who has praised Hollyoaks bosses for their "approach to authentic representation" by sharing: "It's been really exciting exploring a character like Xander, and to be able to wear my hearing aids on screen without them being the driving force behind who he is." He continued: "My hearing loss is a part of me, just as it's a part of Xander, but it doesn't have to define the stories we're able to tell. I think there's something really important about that kind of representation – where a character can exist with a disability, while their relationships and personality drive their story." He alos explained what it was like working with iconic cast members: "It's been such a privilege to work with iconic characters such as Cindy and Warren already. I'm so excited for everyone to see how his storyline unfolds."

A Hollyoaks insider reported to Digital Spy: "Xander's arrival could spark a miracle if he inadvertently gets Cindy and Beth on the same page". They continued: "The two women have been at odds for weeks amid the big secret about how Beth's son Maddox came into the world – and where they all go from here. But on this particular mission, they could be a formidable force as a duo!"

== Chantelle McQueen ==
Chantelle McQueen
- Hollyoaks character
- Portrayed by: Amy Du Quesne
- First appearance: Episode 6779; 5 October 2026
- Introduced by: Hannah Cheers
In-universe information
- Grandmothers: Marlena McQueen
- Aunts: Myra McQueen; Kathleen McQueen; Reenie McQueen
- First cousins: Niall Rafferty; John Paul McQueen; Jacqui McQueen; Mercedes McQueen; Tina Reilly; Carmel McQueen; Michaela McQueen; Carmina McQueen; Theresa McQueen; Porsche McQueen; Celine McQueen; Cleo McQueen

== Others ==
Character	Portrayer(s)	Episode date(s)	Details	Ref(s)
Paramedic	Lauren Sturgess	6 January	A paramedic who tends to Ste Hay (Kieron Richardson) after he is found collapsed in a car park after being poisoned by Lucas Hay (Oscar Curtis).	
Lewis	Lewis Kite	13 January	A student who interacts with Anthony Hutchinson (Brook Debio) inside The Hutch.	
Gym Dealer	Harry Carter	19 January–2 February	A drug dealer who offers to sell Prince McQueen (Malique Thompson-Dwyer) and Anthony (Debio) testosterone pills. Although Prince rejects the offer, he ends up deciding to order some. When he later decides against taking the pills, he returns them to the dealer, but the pair both end up getting arrested.	
Julia	Jessica Paul	20 January	Julia hosts a baby group attended by Leela Dexter (Kirsty-Leigh Porter) and Cleo McQueen (Nadine Mulkerrin). Cleo gets concerned about the amount that Joseph McQueen is crying and leaves the group early.	
Police Officer	Abbie Law-Briggs	26 January	A police officer who escorts Mercedes McQueen (Jennifer Metcalfe) home after she is thrown off of a plane for being drunk.	
Nurse Anne-Marie	Katie Erich	27 January	A nurse at the Thornacre Health Clinic where Mercedes (Metcalfe) checks into for her addiction issues.	
Paediatrician	Kate Dobson	28 January	A paediatrician who looks over Joseph when he is brought into the hospital by Cleo (Mulkerrin) and Sienna Blake (Anna Passey) after he suffers a seizure. Due to previous injuries, the paediatrician and Gemma Johnson (Tisha Merry) fear that Cleo could have injured Joseph.	
Doctor Pearce	Glenda McKay	2 February	A therapist who brought the McQueen family together for a group counselling session to help Mercedes (Metcalfe) in her recovery from her anxiety pill addiction.	
Angela	Amy Du Quesne	4 February	A woman whose car has broken down, however, when she arrives at the mechanics, she finds it empty. Anthony (Debio) offers to help, but he is unable to fit the tyre, leading Ro Hutchinson (Leo Cole) to complete the task instead.	
Miles	Ahmad Sakhi	10–16 February	A modelling scout who spots Vicky Grant (Anya Lawrence) while in a hospital waiting room, imploring her to join his agency. However, at the shoot, Miles is paid off by Gemma Johnson (Tisha Merry) to ruin the shoot, and he complains about Vicky's weight, forcing her to leave in tears. Although Gemma still hands Miles the money, she complains about his comments.	
Savannah	Joanna Bond	25 February	A social worker who meets with Myra McQueen (Nicole Barber-Lane) and Sienna Blake (Anna Passey) to discuss care for Joseph McQueen after Cleo McQueen (Nadine Mulkerrin) is admitted to a psychiatric ward.	
Assistant Chief Constable	Andrew Readman	3–4 March	An assistant chief constable at Dodger Savage's (Danny Mac) misconduct hearing. Ahead of the hearing, the assistant chief constable is paid off by Connor "Sully" Sullivan (Harry French) to find in his favour. However, when Donny Clark (Louis Emerick) arrives with evidence that Sully had raped him, he is forced to dismiss the charges against Dodger and arrest Sully.	
Endocrinologist	Kerry Parkins	4 March	An endocrinologist who treats Joseph McQueen following several seizures.	
Dr Copper	Isaac Rowan	10 March	Dr Copper is a doctor confronted by Tony Hutchinson (Nick Pickard) after hearing the news that his wife, Diane Hutchinson (Alex Fletcher), had been diagnosed with terminal ovarian cancer.	
Melissa	Abigail Middleton	31 March–12 May	A celebrant for Ste Hay (Kieron Richardson) and Rex Gallagher (Jonny Labey) who meets the couple while they are experiencing a rough patch in their relationship, although she is initially put off by their behaviour, she is won around following testimony from Rex's grandfather, Froggy Black (John Middleton). She later marries the couple at The Dog in the Pond.	
Football Coach	Andrea Kristina	6 April	A football coach at a holiday camp who calls in Warren Fox (Jamie Lomas) and Sienna Blake (Anna Passey) following the violent behaviour of their daughter, Sophie Blake (Scarlett Kerr).	
Doctor	Ceri Riddle	15 April	A doctor who assesses Caleb Keane (Lewis Walton) after he is admitted to hospital following a car crash. He tells Jonah Keane (Matthew Wolfenden) and Beth Keane (Rebecca Ryan) that damage to Caleb's spine could cause him to lose the ability to walk.	
DI Honeywell	Jenny Platt	20 April–19 May	A police officer who investigates the crash between the Keanes' moving van and the teenagers' car. She initially attempts to find Charlie Dean (Charlie Behan) to interview him about the crash, and at the station, he claims that it was caused by Jonah Keane's (Matthew Wolfenden) dangerous driving. When Charlie later confesses to driving dangerously, DI Honeywell arrests and charges him.	
Nurse	Natasha Culley	6–20 May	A nurse at an assisted living facility who attempts to stop Warren Fox (Jamie Lomas) from seeing his brother, Spencer Gray (Darren John Langford). When Warren continued to attempt, she threatened to call the police on him, prompting him to storm off. She was then thanked by Jenson Cole (Ryan Clayton). When Warren later returned, she admitted to him that Spencer had never been at the facility and Jenson had asked her to lie.	
Teacher	Lois Mackie	18 May	A teacher at Eva Hutchinson's (Aubrey Burgess) school who tells her father Tony Hutchinson (Nick Pickard) that Diane Hutchinson (Alex Fletcher) had yet to book an appointment for parents' evening. Tony told her that he would book the appointment later, hiding the fact that Diane had passed away the day before.	
Paul	Benjamin Yates	22 June	A man hired by Gemma Johnson (Tisha Merry) to carry out an arson attack with Jenson Cole (Ryan Clayton). Paul is admitted to hospital with burns and attempts to flee. He is then confronted by Jenson, who threatens his family. When Paul attempts to escape again, he knocks over Rex Gallagher (Jonny Labey) before getting arrested.	
Alison	Lauren Dickenson	23 June–19 August	A police handler for Dodger Savage (Danny Mac) who speaks to him about going undercover again, although Dodger later decides against the work. Alison later meets Jenson Cole (Ryan Clayton) as his handler, warning him that he had gone rogue and disregarding his information about Warren Fox (Jamie Lomas) and Gemma Johnson (Tisha Merry).	
Billy	Joseph Carter	6–22 July	A man working for Gemma Johnson (Tisha Merry) who guards a set of crypto-wallets alongside Jenson Cole (Ryan Clayton). When the wallets were disappeared, Billy was among the people accused, and he later lunged at Gemma with a knife while at The Loft, before being thrown out by Jenson. When Jenson later attempted to escape Gemma, he roped Billy into his plan, with Billy stabbing Dodger Savage (Danny Mac) as he fled the scene. Despite this, Billy continued working for Gemma; however, he was later knocked out by her before disguising him as Jenson at a derelict warehouse. When Warren Fox (Jamie Lomas) arrived on the scene, he shot Billy, believing him to be Jenson.	
Martin Frost	Darren Tighe	29 July–5 August	A man who shoots and kills Rex Gallagher (Jonny Labey) for his part in the sex trafficking of his daughter, Tara. Martin initially blames the death on Cindy Cunningham (Stephanie Waring) before confessing to the crime. He dies in prison off-screen, devastating his son Xander Frost (Indigo Kamal-Poole).	
Physio	David Campbell	10 August	A physio who supports and encourages Caleb Keane (Lewis Walton) as he continues to attempt to walk following a car accident that left him partially paralysed.	
Jodie	Scarlet Buckley	2 September	Jodie is the cellmate of Sienna Blake (Anna Passey) who is released at the same time of her, thanking her for helping her survive in prison. When Jodie spots Sienna have a tense conversation with Jenson Cole (Ryan Clayton) she interrupts them before meeting her ex-girlfriend, Abigail Matthews (Brooke Vincent). Abigail rejects Jodie's hopes of reconciliation, telling her to move away from Chester.	
Brick	Christopher Earl Jones	2–23 September	A lackey hired by Gemma Johnson (Tisha Merry) to kidnap Mercedes McQueen (Jennifer Metcalfe); however, under orders from Imran Maalik (Ijaz Rana), he instead kidnaps Ste Hay (Kieron Richardson). He is later seen abandoning a van and saying that someone can "sort their own mess out".	
Zack	George Miller	2–23 September	A man who takes photographs of Ste Hay (Kieron Richardson) as he wanders through a shopping centre. Zack later travels to Hollyoaks, where he begins stalking Leah Barnes (Charlotte Alex Riley), breaking into her home and stealing some of her belongings. When he is arrested, Zack admits to stalking Leah, but denies playing any part in Ste's disappearance.	
Harper	Phoenix Gulzar Brown	2 September–6 October	Harper is a woman working at an insurance company who interacts with a dazed Ste Hay (Kieron Richardson) in a shopping centre. She is later seen when Tony Hutchinson (Nick Pickard) and Sienna Blake (Anna Passey) head to her insurance company after seeing Ste holding a paper belonging to the firm. She dismisses Sienna's belief that the pair had met previously.	
Handherchief Woman	Rachel Hayden	2 September	A group of people who interact with a confused and dazed Ste Hay (Kieron Richardson) as he wanders around a shopping centre before he is kidnapped by Brick.	
Salesman	Dom Simpson	2 September	A group of people who interact with a confused and dazed Ste Hay (Kieron Richardson) as he wanders around a shopping centre before he is kidnapped by Brick.	
