= Warren Fox =

Fictional character from Hollyoaks

- Hollyoaks character
- Portrayed by: Jamie Lomas
- Duration: 2006–2011, 2016–present
- First appearance: 26 June 2006
- Introduced by: Bryan Kirkwood (2006, 2016–2020); Paul Marquess (2010); Hannah Cheers (2025)
- Spin-off appearances: Hollyoaks Later (2011, 2025)
- Crossover appearances: Brookside (2025)
In-universe information
- Other names: Foxy; Mike Jones
- Occupation: Club owner; Pub landlord; Garage owner; Mechanic; Businessman; Career criminal
- Mother: Norma Crow
- Adoptive father: Bill Fox
- Adoptive mother: Tracy Fox
- Brothers: Spencer Gray (foster)
- Half-brothers: Jenson Cole
- Half-sisters: Katy Fox
- Sons: Joel Dexter; Sebastian Blake
- Daughters: Ella Richardson; Sophie Blake; Maria-Gabriella Fox-McQueen
- Grandsons: Noah Dexter; Joseph McQueen
- Granddaughters: Clara Dexter

Warren Fox is a fictional character from the British soap opera Hollyoaks, portrayed by Jamie Lomas. The character and casting were announced on 12 May 2006, and Warren made his first appearance on 26 June. Warren was introduced as a ruthless gangster and an old acquaintance of Sean Kennedy (Matthew Jay Lewis). Warren's early storylines involved his dealings in many crimes such as drug dealing and protection rackets amongst other things, affairs with Mercedes McQueen (Jennifer Metcalfe) and Mandy Richardson (Sarah Jayne Dunn), murdering associate Sean Kennedy and ex-fiancée Louise Summers (Roxanne McKee) and feuds with both Clare Devine (Gemma Bissix) and Calvin Valentine (Ricky Whittle). Lomas left the series in 2009, with his departure coinciding with the return of Clare Devine, Lomas' exit scenes aired on 29 May 2009. On 17 October 2010, it was announced that Lomas would return to the series, appearing from 29 October. In the stint, Warren enters into a relationship with Mitzeee Minniver (Rachel Shenton), embarking on a feud with Brendan Brady (Emmett J. Scanlan) and discovering he has a son in Joel Dexter (Andrew Still). The character departed in December 2011 when he was sent to prison for murder.

Warren was reintroduced in May 2016 were the characters storylines included embarking on a relationship with Sienna Blake (Anna Passey) and murdering Bart McQueen (Jonny Clarke). In November 2017, Lomas confirmed his exit from the soap opera in the hope of pursuing other projects, though the character was given an opportunity to return. Lomas departed on 8 November 2017. On 30 March 2018, it was announced that Lomas would reprise the role, and he returned for a one-off appearance on 22 May 2018. In July 2019 it was announced that Lomas would be reprising the role, and Warren returned for a brief appearance on 30 July 2019 before making his full-time return on 8 January 2020. The soap opera explored his backstory with the introduction of childhood bully Felix Westwood (Richard Blackwood) and coming face to face with his biological mother Norma Crow (Glynis Barber). In March 2024, it was confirmed that Lomas would be leaving the role later in 2024 to pursue other projects. His final scenes aired 11 September 2024 when Warren fled the country after a final showdown with Dave Chen-Williams (Dominic Power). In March 2025 it was announced Warren would be return for a special flashback episode to explore what the character was up to in the missing year after the showdown with Dave. Warren made his one-off appearance in the episode airing on 7 April 2025. It was reported in May 2025 that Lomas would be reprising the role for another brief stint, this time in present day. On 28 July 2025 it was announced that Lomas had reprised his role and would return full time during the 30th Anniversary Celebrations. Warren returned on 13 October 2025. On 22 October 2025 Warren appeared in the crossover episode between Hollyoaks and Brookside as it would be revealed he was dating Brookside character Gemma Johnson (Tisha Merry) and by January 2026 the show introduce a younger half-brother for Warren in the form of Jenson Cole (Ryan Clayton).

== Development ==
=== Introduction ===
In May 2006, it was announced that Lomas would arrive in Hollyoaks as "bad boy" Warren Fox. In regards to Lomas and Whittle's casting, a Hollyoaks spokesperson stated: "We're delighted to welcome Ricky and Jamie to the Hollyoaks cast. Their characters are set to bring lots of drama to the show!"

=== Fire stunt and fake death ===
In 2009, Lomas decided to quit the soap opera after three years. He said: "I've had a fantastic three years at Hollyoaks but having fully explored the character, I felt the time was right for me to move on. I'm delighted to be going out as part of such a dramatic storyline and my final scenes are some of the most dramatic I've ever filmed. I'm sure viewers will be hooked!"

Following the announcement of Warren's return in October 2010, Lomas was asked if he thought the character changed since his last appearance. He replied, "I don't think you can really change a character like Warren. I think it would be a little boring if he came back as some sort of softie but, like I say, there are new people around now for him to bounce off."

During an interview with Digital Spy, Lomas admitted he initially wanted to stay on the show for only two years: "Well I wanted to go after two years. I sat down with Bryan Kirkwood who told me what he had in store, and it was too good to refuse! The storyline was so fantastic." He later revealed how he felt about his final appearance, admitting: "To be honest with you, when I knew I was filming my final scene – obviously I've spent three years of my life there and I've got lots of good friends there – I got really emotional. I had to take myself off and have a word with myself and say, 'Come on – you need to pull it together!' It was great because all the producers came down and clapped me and bought me a bottle of champagne. It was very emotional."

Lomas was announced to return to Hollyoaks in October 2010 after the character was revealed to have survived the fire. Series producer Paul Marquess commented on Warren's return, saying: "We were hopeful that Jamie's return would be the best-kept secret in soap history, but when Jamie arrived on set it proved impossible. When Warren Fox died in the Loft fire, we all thought that was the end of the dangerous gangster that terrorized the residents of Hollyoaks village. But when our writers made the shocking suggestion to bring back Warren in a juicy plot, it was just too irresistible to ignore as they not only made it feasible that Warren could have escaped the fire and fled the village, they created an explosive and very clever plot with lots of twists and turns that is guaranteed to have the audience hooked. When the idea was pitched to Jamie, he knew it was too good an opportunity to miss. Warren Fox was one of the soap's most memorable villains and we're very excited about his return." He returned on 29 October 2010. Lomas later expressed his feelings about returning, saying: "I'm really excited. I got the call and I got told about the storyline and it was great – full of twists and turns. I kind of thought that my character had run his course with the other characters that were around before, but there's a new breed in now, so that means plenty of potential for Warren to come back in and cause some more mayhem." On-screen, flashback sequences were filmed to show how Warren survived the fire. Hollyoaks announced a special episode centered around Warren and how he survived the fire to be broadcast on 1 December 2010, shown to viewers in various flashbacks.

=== 2011 departure ===
In August 2011, it was announced that Lomas had decided to leave the serial once again, and he filmed his final scenes in October 2011. His departure was broadcast on 23 December 2011.

=== Returns and departures ===
In March 2016, it was confirmed that Lomas had agreed to reprise his role as Warren. The character returned in reasonable fashion where Warren was seen in a "sexy shower stunt". He returned on 26 May.

On 3 November 2017, Lomas announced that he had left Hollyoaks once again and Warren would depart on-screen the following week. Lomas made the announcement during a live televised interview on This Morning. His departure storyline saw him leave with his new-born daughter, Sophie. Lomas decided to leave because he wanted to participate in the seventeenth series of the reality television series, I'm a Celebrity...Get Me Out of Here! Warren departed during the episode broadcast on 7 November 2017.

On 30 March 2018, it was reported that Lomas was in talks with producers about a potential return. Lomas agreed to return for one episode which aired on 21 May 2018. Warren's return storyline featured him taking his son Sebastian from Sienna and absconding. On 23 July 2019, it was announced that Lomas had agreed to re-join the show's regular cast. Lomas initially filmed scenes for a story to air in late 2019, with his full-time return scheduled for 2020. Warren's reintroduction occurs following Sienna tracking down the location of her children that Warren abducted. Lomas' indefinite return began from the episode broadcast on 9 January 2020.

On 12 March 2024, it was announced that Lomas had quit the show for the fourth time and Warren departed on 11 September 2024.

== Storylines ==
=== 2006–2011 ===
Warren arrives in Hollyoaks in June 2006 to demand money from Sean Kennedy (Matthew Jay Lewis) as compensation for having him jailed, but is willing to write off Sean's debts in exchange for a night with his wife, Louise Kennedy (Roxanne McKee), who refuses. Warren enters into an affair with Clare Cunningham (Gemma Bissix), whilst she is still married to Max Cunningham (Matt Littler). They are taped by Mel Burton (Cassie Powney), who later shows the footage to Sam "OB" O'Brien (Darren Jeffries) and Sophie Burton (Connie Powney). Mel and Sophie are killed afterwards, and OB is severely injured, in the explosion at The Dog in the Pond. OB tells Max about the affair and he fires Warren from The Loft, who later hires thugs to trash the building. Max reluctantly signs his half of The Loft over to Warren. When Clare returns, she and Warren become partners in owning the business, though they get into a dispute afterwards.

Mercedes McQueen (Jennifer Metcalfe) sleeps with Warren after being accused of infidelity by her boyfriend, Russ Owen (Stuart Manning). When Warren learns of Sean's return and demand of £10,000 from Louise, he agrees to help Louise amass the money. Warren later kidnaps Sean and kills him. He supports Louise after she ends her relationship with Calvin Valentine (Ricky Whittle). After sleeping together, Louise guiltily reunites with Calvin. Justin Burton (Chris Fountain) later lives with Warren, who is arrested for Sean's murder after Clare alerts the police. He is released after Sean's body could not be found. Warren is arrested for the attempt on Clare's life, but is pronounced innocent when Mercedes admits she was with him. Warren visits Justin in the hospital, revealing he was the assailant who almost killed him with a car and later.

Warren grows fonder of Justin, who begins working for him, as Louise and Warren's relationship becomes more serious. Clare continues to try and drive Louise and Warren apart. Warrens threatens to push her from the balcony if she does not sign over The Loft to him and leave Hollyoaks, to which she agrees. Days later, Warren returns home to his flat to find it trashed and no sign of Katy. Warren, Justin, and Max begin looking for her, and are later called by Clare, who tells them she has Katy. Clare tells Warren that she wants revenge on Justin for pushing her over the balcony. Warren pretends to kill Justin. Clare is not fooled and drives off with Katy tied up in the car. She crashes over a cliff and falls into the water below. Warren, Justin and Max jump in and rescue Katy. Katy attempts to try to tell Louise that Warren killed Sean, but he ends up proposing to her, and she accepts. During their engagement party, Louise becomes suspicious of Warren's dealings and is later attacked in Evissa by Ste Hay (Kieron Richardson), who leaves Louise for dead. Calvin saves Louise, and Warren beats up Ste the next day.

After a poker game with Tony Hutchinson (Nick Pickard), Mike Barnes (Tony Hirst) and Darren Osborne (Ashley Taylor Dawson), Warren ends up winning Darren's half of The Dog. Warren's old friends appear at The Dog and hold everyone hostage, which ends with Darren getting shot. Louise feels she cannot trust Warren anymore but forgives him when he signs back his half of The Dog to the Osbornes. Newt (Nico Mirallegro) and Lauren Valentine (Dominique Jackson) find Sean's body, and Warren confesses to Louise that he killed him. Louise is furious but becomes angrier when she finds out Katy knew. Louise then exposes Katy and Zak Ramsey's (Kent Riley) affair to Warren. Katy is angry when Louise agrees to become an alibi for Warren on the night of Sean's death as she does not want him to go to prison. Katy tells Warren to admit to the murder but he refuses. She decides to leave but is dragged from a taxi by Louise and Warren. After Warren attempts to convince Katy to stay, she leaves. Louise is later arrested for Sean's murder. Warren and Darren persuade mentally unstable Jake Dean (Kevin Sacre) to confess to Sean's murder, and Louise is released.

Mandy Richardson (Sarah Jayne Dunn) helps Warren plan his wedding to Louise, who becomes very suspicious of Warren and Mandy, believing they are sleeping together. Cindy Cunningham (Stephanie Waring) pushes Louise further into believing this. Louise turns to alcohol, which drives Warren to confide in Mandy and begin an affair. Ravi Roy (Stephen Uppal) finds Mandy and Warren sleeping together on one occasion but agrees to keep quiet. Nige Foster (Sam Townend) is revealed to be alive, and Warren pays Nige money to stay hidden so that it keeps Calvin on his side. Calvin agrees to take part in a raid on The Loft after he is approached by DI Mark Gascoyne (Craig Russell). Not having time to warn Warren about the raid, Calvin goes along with Mark and two other officers, whom he later discovers are not police officers and that the raid is unofficial. Mark gets Calvin to beat Warren up as revenge. Calvin agrees, but he phones an ambulance afterwards.

Mandy tells Louise about the affair and the pair plan revenge on Warren after Louise tells Mandy that Warren killed Sean. They come up with a plan to steal Warren's money and go to the police about the murder. Louise sees CCTV footage of Warren and Mandy sleeping together in The Loft and decides to murder Warren and frame Mandy. On the wedding day, Warren, Ravi and Spencer arrive at the hotel where the wedding is being held. Warren goes up to Louise's room where he hides a necklace for her but finds the gun which she plans to use to kill him. Warren takes the gun and removes the bullets as Louise returns to the room. He gives her the necklace and asks if the gun was his present. Louise reveals she hates Warren because he had ruined her life, killed her husband, and cheated on her. Warren begins crying and apologizes to Louise, telling her that he wants to start a family with her. Louise picks up the gun and tells him she could never bring his child into the world. However, Louise discovers the gun is empty and Warren reveals he has the bullets. Warren attacks Louise and kills her. The wedding party believe Louise left Warren due to his affair, unaware of her death, and Warren watches as Mandy leaves the village with Tony. Calvin and his wife, Carmel (Gemma Merna) approach him in an attempt to comfort him, and she mentions that Louise was pregnant, leaving Warren devastated.

Warren captures the affections of Sasha Valentine (Nathalie Emmanuel), who Warren asks to help look after Spencer Gray (Darren John Langford). He upsets her by having a one-night stand with Sarah Barnes (Loui Batley), but Warren and Sasha eventually begin a relationship with her moving in. Calvin makes numerous attempts to stop his sister from seeing Warren, however it only pushes her away. Calvin then records a confession from Warren that he murdered Sean and Louise. Mark arrests Warren, but later tells Calvin that the recorder has not worked and that Warren will be released. Calvin goes to see Warren at The Loft and a fight breaks out. Warren is knocked over The Loft balcony. Sasha breaks them up as onlookers watch. After Calvin announces Warren as a murderer in front of the villagers, Sasha takes Warren's side.

Warren becomes the victim of a hate campaign with posters spread around the village declaring him to be a murderer, and he receives anonymous phone calls and poison pen letters. In an attempt to leave the village with some money, Warren makes a deal with Justin to burn down The Loft for £5,000 so that he can claim the insurance money and Justin can get money to start a new life with Hannah Ashworth (Emma Rigby). Justin agrees and goes to meet Warren at The Loft, but is stopped by Calvin who tells him not to get involved with another of Warren's schemes. Justin changes his mind and leaves, only to be seen by Sasha. While waiting for Justin in the club, Warren is knocked out by Clare using a baseball bat. She tells him that both he and Justin have ruined her life and makes Warren call Justin to meet at The Loft. Calvin then arrives to speak to Warren and finds Warren tied up, Clare with a match and The Loft covered in petrol. He is about to call the police, but after Warren taunts Clare by saying that he always wins, Calvin backs off and leaves his fate in Clare's hands. Hannah arrives at The Loft to find Justin and Clare accidentally knocks her out. She wakes up and attacks Clare, who drops a match onto the bar, and the pair fall through the banister to the floor below unconscious. Justin enters The Loft through the upstairs door, where he finds Warren tied up. Justin asks him where Hannah is and Warren tells him that she is not there. Justin starts to untie him but he hears Hannah's calls for help and realizes that Warren lied. He leaves him in the fire and escapes with Hannah. Clare is nowhere to be seen and has escaped. Warren unties himself and realizes he cannot get out of the balcony door so jumps down the cellar door, he lands on his ankle on the stairs and breaks it. Warren looks up at the ceiling mirror, which collapses onto him.

Over a year after his supposed death, Warren returns to Hollyoaks in October 2010. He breaks into Chez Chez and leaves a dead fox for club owner Cheryl Brady (Bronagh Waugh). The next day, Warren follows Mandy in the village and is seen by Tom Cunningham (Ellis Hollins), who claims to have seen Warren's ghost. Warren is later seen by Tony walking past the village walls. Mandy and Warren meet, revealing they are in a relationship and have had contact since their last encounter. Warren tells Mandy that they are going to destroy Tony as revenge for him leaving her abroad. The following day, Warren and Mandy argue and she threatens him. He later enters the McQueens' home and asks Theresa McQueen (Jorgie Porter) who she has told and mentions that someone else knows. It is later revealed that Theresa witnessed Warren escaping The Loft and that he has been blackmailed since then. On another occasion, Warren threatens to push Theresa from a roof in the village if she does not tell him who has been blackmailing him. Warren reveals how he escaped the fire: days before the fire Warren meets a suicidal man named Dale Greer (Chris Geere). Dale and Warren bond and he begins working for him. When Clare starts the fire and Warren is apparently killed by the mirror, the floors collapsed and Warren is found by Dale in the cellar. After being rescued by Dale, Warren realizes everyone believes he is still in the club, and he kills Dale before putting his body in the cellar. Warren then threatens to kill Theresa, who witnesses him escaping if she tells anyone and then leaves the village. With Warren still threatening to push her, she admits she killed Calvin and they start a platonic relationship, in which they both protect the other's secret.

Warren breaks into Chez Chez and tries to break the floor with a sledgehammer, but he is interrupted by Brendan Brady (Emmett J. Scanlan). Brendan asks who Warren is, and he lies, saying that he is Cheryl's boyfriend before phoning Mandy for information about him. Warren enters The Dog to the surprise of local residents. Claiming to have suffered from amnesia, Warren pretends to regain some of his memory of several people. Warren later confronts Tony and the pair have a stand off, with Tony threatening to attack Warren for telling Dom to burn down his restaurant which resulted in Steph and Malachy's deaths. Warren leaves and Brendan tells Tony to call the police and inform them that Warren is still alive. He is later arrested and taken into custody to be interviewed by DC Ethan Scott (Craig Vye). Warren tells Ethan to speak to his commanding officers and later Warren is released. After returning to the village Warren meets with Cheryl in time for Christmas. A few days later Warren returns to the club where he starts to dig up the floor. Danny Houston watches Warren on the club's CCTV and calls Brendan, telling him to find out what Warren is up to, believing him to be in league with the police. Brendan locks Warren in the cellar and demands to be told everything. Brendan then leaves Warren locked in the cellar until he admits to what he is up to. Warren and Brendan plan to get Danny's half of the club from him, but Brendan kills Danny. Warren helps Brendan get rid of Danny's body in the pond by the Dog.

Warren learns that Mandy had been sending him the texts in order for him to come back to Hollyoaks with her, and he scares her out the village. In order to stop Theresa from being sent to prison, Warren arranges for Kyle to be beaten up meaning the court case has to be postponed. Brendan helps Warren by getting Kyle to escape from the hospital, leaving him to go on the run. Brendan jumps to the wrong conclusions believing that Warren really killed Calvin and that Theresa is taking the blame for him. Brendan pretends to be Warren and encourages Kyle to seek revenge on Theresa.

Although Warren is supposed to be with Cheryl, he cheats on her with Mitzeee (Rachel Shenton). Warren does not understand why she is interested in Brendan, not knowing their relationship is fake. Warren and Mitzeee almost sleep together but are stopped before they have chance when Cheryl walks in. Warren reassures Theresa when she hears that Kyle is still around, thinking that Brendan has ensured that Kyle took the money and ran. Warren becomes suspicious when Kyle comes to Chez Chez asking for Warren, and he later sees him talking to Brendan. Warren desperately persuades Theresa not to leave with her baby in fear of Kyle, but she leaves anyway. When Warren phones Theresa and Kyle answers, telling him that he is doing what they had arranged, Warren realizes that Brendan has been pretending to be him. At first Brendan refuses to tell Warren where Kyle has taken Theresa, but tells him when he realizes that Theresa and her baby, Kathleen-Angel, might die. Warren turns up and Kyle knocks him out. Warren regains consciousness afterwards and shoots Kyle in the back, not knowing that he is holding Kathleen-Angel, and Kyle falls down the lift shaft with her. Theresa is horrified and believes that Warren had been plotting with Kyle all along after what Kyle had said on the phone. Ethan, who had been pushed down the lift shaft by Kyle previously, helps Warren get Kathleen-Angel out but cannot get out himself. Warren urges Theresa to leave with Carmel and the baby but she goes back to save Ethan. She falls into the lift shaft while trying and forces Warren to save Ethan before she lets him save herself. He saves Ethan and then suddenly the lift plummets with Theresa still on top of it.

As Theresa fights for her life in the hospital, Carmel accuses Warren of being in love with Theresa. Warren makes sure Ethan stays quiet and Theresa thanks him. He then sleeps with Mitzeee before fighting with Brendan. They call a truce until Ste attacks Brendan with a baseball bat, which hospitalises him. Warren steals drugs from Brendan later that month and starts a relationship with Mitzeee. When Mitzeee's mother, Trish (Paula Wolfenden), is imprisoned, Ethan agrees to let her go if she gets a confession from Warren admitting to Louise's murder. She tries to tape record him, but Warren finds out. Warren confesses to Mitzeee about Louise's murder. On Hollyoaks Later, Warren is told by Mitzeee to get the truth from him about Mercedes. Warren then hires a prostitute called Honey for Seth Costello (Miles Higson). He later finds Seth over Honey's corpse and buries her dead body in the forest. Warren later tells Mitzeee that he tricked Seth into believing he had killed Honey. Seth's older brother, Riley (Rob Norbury), learns about the trickery and locks Warren down a mine. After escaping, Warren then reveals to Mitzeee he about Mercedes having an affair with Riley's father, Carl Costello (Paul Opacic). When he returns, he visits Brendan in prison.

Mitzeee spends one night at Riley's. Nothing happens, but Riley's brother Jason Costello (Victoria Atkin) takes a picture of them together and sends it to Warren. Carl and Mitzeee stop Warren from attacking Riley, but after the Costellos harass Mitzeee, she and Warren decide to destroy the Costellos on the wedding day. Warren fires Gilly and rehires Rhys within the day. Warren threatens Doug to keep quiet, and blackmails £50,000 from Mercedes and Carl. Carl gives him half, with the other half on condition of the truth not coming out at the wedding. Doug tells Warren he is going to tell the truth, and Warren throws Doug to the ground, forceing him to put copies of Mitzeee's book underneath each chair. Warren attacks Doug after seeing him tell Seth to expose the truth. In the end, Mercedes tells Riley about the affair at the wedding, and Warren attacks Doug after the wedding. Warren visits Brendan in prison to get his share of Chez Chez, but Warren organises an assault on him after being refused. When Ethan accidentally runs over Rob Edwards (David Atkins), Warren helps Ethan repair his vehicle and exploits the situation for Ethan's help. Mitzeee leaves Warren, and he throws Mitzeee's clothes into the river in retaliation before threatening Ste and Cheryl. When he threatens new DJ Joel Dexter (Andrew Still), Joel claims Warren is his father. Warren goes into denial, believing the claim to be either one of Brendan's games or a lie told to Joel by his mother, but Theresa convinces him to take a DNA test which confirms the claim. After this happens Brendan returns and he and Warren declare a truce but Warren tells Ethan he is going to kill Brendan and he wants an alibi from him.

Mitzeee and Brendan hatch a plan to get Warren out of the way by uncovering Louise's murder and getting him sent to prison. Warren tells Mitzeee he wants to marry her, but agrees to show her Louise's grave beforehand. Warren forces her to dig Louise's grave and orders Joel to shoot Brendan whilst they are in the car to find Warren and Mitzeee. Warren starts to strangle Mitzeee when she refuses to keep digging. Brendan arrives just in time to save her, and holds Warren at gunpoint, telling him that he shot Joel. Warren disarms Brendan before picking up a brick to kill him. Joel arrives and hits Warren with the shove and reveals he and Brendan came to an agreement. The police that Brendan called arrive and arrest Warren for Louise's murder. Warren tells Mitzeee he wished he had killed her and tells Joel he is no son of his. Brendan taunts Warren before he is taken away in a police car.

=== 2016– ===
James Nightingale (Gregory Finnegan) gets Warren released early on legal technicalities. He poses as Mike Jones to trick Mitzeee's sister, Maxine Minniver (Nikki Sanderson), and starts a relationship with her. He tries to steal a key from her flat storing hidden money in order to pay legal fees, but Sienna Blake (Anna Passey) steals the key and blackmails him into helping her secure a murder confession from Maxine in exchange for it. Warren reveals that his real reason for being back in the village is to get vengeance for the death of his sister, Katy. Warren prepares to leave again, but Sienna gives him the key and they sleep together. Warren is then able to get Maxine to confess that she buried Sienna's father, Patrick Blake's (Jeremy Sheffield) corpse. Warren initially hides the fact from Sienna after discovering how vulnerable Maxine is, but Sienna pushes him and he reveals the truth. They call the police who investigate the part of the city wall where Patrick is buried. When Maxine returns from the police station, Warren and Sienna announce that they were together to make Maxine confess, and Maxine leaves.

Warren continues his feud with other residents. He rescues Sienna's daughter Nico Blake (Persephone Swales-Dawson) and her friend Peri Lomax (Ruby O'Donnell) whilst they are lost in the woods. The same day, Warren and Sienna begin a relationship after she separates from her husband Ben Bradley. Warren visits several places in the village relevant to his past, and discovers there is a hate campaign against him started by the Osbornes who have prohibited detailing his murderous past. Warren tries to bond with Peri's father Cameron Campbell (Cameron Moore), but he tells Warren he knows of his criminal past, leaving Warren angry. He breaks into the Osbournes' house and sends Jack an anonymous photograph of a police award on Jack's mantelpiece, and threatens Jack to end the hate campaign, or Warren will expose Jack's dark secrets regarding Warren's former cellmate Billy to the rest village.

Warren becomes friends with Freddie Roscoe (Charlie Clapham) after learning that he needs an engine for his van, and steals Dirk Savage's (David Kennedy) engine unknown to Freddie. Although Freddie threatens to pull the plug on the sale for lack of interest, Warren sells the renovated camper van to Mac Nightingale (David Easter) for £18,000. Aware of the financial difficulty the garage is in, Warren buys the Roscoe's garage from the bank. Darren turns to Clare's sister, Grace Black (Tamara Wall), for help to get rid of Warren. After learning that Sienna is still seeing Warren, Grace recruits Darren, Maxine and Tony to go burn down the garage, but she tips Warren off about the impending arson attack in a bid to win his trust. Grace invites Warren to the club for a business proposition and slides a gun over the table to Warren for protection, but he refuses. She takes his keys and phone and texts Sienna to go to the garage, and takes the gun with her to shoot her half-brother Liam Donovan (Maxim Baldry). Grace and Liam's brother Adam Donovan (Jimmy Essex) thinks Warren did it and attacks him in the restaurant. He retaliates then realises that he is being set up. Liam later gives the police his statement telling them it was Warren who shot him and Warren is arrested.

Warren is released as there is no evidence to prove that he shot Liam. He visits Grace in The Loft and tells her he knows she shot Liam and set him up, Warren physically threatens her and she complies. Warren takes full control of the Roscoe garage, renaming it "Warren Wheels". Warren tries to form a truce with Darren and Maxine, but Maxine is reluctant. When Darren and Nancy go into the woods to search for Patrick's body, they enter a bunker where Warren locks them inside. Nancy begs Warren to let Darren out due to an angina attack, but he refuses until he confesses to being part of Patrick's death. Sienna disregards Warren's threat and calls the ambulance, though they decide to take Darren and Nancy to the hospital. Warren refuses to let them out of the car unless they confess to Patrick's murder, but Nancy manages to get Darren out. Warren finds out that Maxine is pregnant and believes he is the father. He visits Maxine to find out the truth and is interrupted by Adam. The two of them fight until Maxine intervenes. Maxine lies to Warren and tells him the baby is Adam's, Warren doesn't believe her and warns her not to lie to him.

Warren enters the garage where DI Ryan Knight (Duncan James) waits. Ryan offers information of the whereabouts of Warren's son Joel (Rory Douglas-Speed), in return for information on Sienna and Maxine's involvement regarding the Patrick's murder. Warren loses his temper and demands to know where Joel is; Ryan refuses to tell him but leaves his contact card. Later that day he sees Sienna being harassed by DS Gavin Armstrong (Andrew Hayden-Smith) in the street and confronts him. When Warren realises the police suspect Sienna of Patrick's murder, he organises false two passports for them both to leave the country and tells her to flee later that evening. Warren later encounters Joel, and Warren asks him if he is working with Ryan, which Joel denies. Joel reveals he overheard Warren organizing false passports and warns him that he needs to stay around for his and Maxine's baby, he tells Warren if he leaves with Sienna, he will be a criminal for the rest of his life. Joel leaves and Warren goes to meet his contact to collect the passports, Sienna calls him in a panic, advising him they need to leave immediately, but Warren has a change of heart and tells Sienna he needs to be a father and stay in Hollyoaks.

Warren learns from the hospital that the baby is his. He is determined to be a father again, but Maxine is accidentally locked in the hospital lift by Nico and Peri. Maxine later loses the baby, and Warren overhears Nico on the phone to Peri, so he angrily confronts her, and she tells him it was Cameron who did it so Warren locks him and Cameron in the lift, telling Cameron he hurt Leela. Warren attacks him but is stopped by Maxine. The two go to see Sienna and Warren tells her he knows everything that Nico has done and convinces her to retract her statement. Sienna gets out of jail and the two try to find Nico. Warren goes to find Nico and Tom. Warren realises Sienna is in a burning maze looking for Nico, so he rushes in and sees Sienna and Nico are in danger. He saves Sienna despite her pleas for him to save Nico, which collapses on him.

A few days later, Sienna refuses to forgive Warren for ignoring her plea. After many arguments, Warren takes Sienna back when she reveals she is pregnant and the baby is his, after a pregnancy scare it is revealed they are having twins. When Bart, who is framed for Katy's death, is arrested for a different crime, Warren arranges for James to get him out of police custody to kill him, Warren does eventually does kill Bart with Sienna later helps him to get rid of the body but Warren later burries Bart's body in the grave dug for Amy Barnes (Ashley Slanina-Davies) during her funeral. Warren later begins an affair with Grace behind Sienna's back, though Sienna later reveals she has cancer and needs an operation, causing Warren to end his affair with Grace. Warren is blackmailed by a stalker (who is revealed to be Mandy) threatening him to pay them £3,000 or they will expose his affair with Grace.

On his wedding day, Grace stabs him in the back after a confrontation at The Loftand he is hospitalized. Weeks later, Grace tries to get into Sienna's head about Warren's villainous ways, which eventually causes Sienna to try and flee Hollyoaks with the help of Grace and Glenn Donovan to get away from Warren, and he holds her hostage in his countryside house. As she goes into labour, Kim Butterfield (Daisy Wood-Davis) and Farrah Maalik (Krupa Pattani) locate Sienna and arrive to save her, but Warren catches them. They argue but soon come to an agreement to take Sienna to the hospital after Warren learns that she still has cancer where she gave birth to two healthy babies. After the babies are born, Sienna tells Warren to leave and never come back or she will tell the police everything he has done, including her kidnapping and Bart's murder. He packs his bags and says goodbye to his son Joel. Moments later Myra McQueen (Nicole Barber-Lane) walks into Esther's Magic Bean and shows Warren the video of Joel giving his sister the drugs that killed her. Warren knocks Joel out and ties him up in the garage. As he is about to kill him, Tony Hutchinson runs in and talks some sense into him. He relents and Joel is let go. Warren later secretly goes to the hospital to kidnap Sophie (renaming her Katy, after his deceased sister) packs her in the car and leaves the village for good.

A year later, believing Sienna is dead following a faux police announcement to draw out Nico, Warren returns to the village to kidnap his son Sebastian. He locates Sienna and Nico on the roof of Hollyoaks Hospital and tricks Sienna by selling her a future in Spain, asking her to choose between a life with him and the twins, or Nico. Sienna chooses Warren and Nico attacks her in a jealous rage; Warren picks up Sebastian and leaves.

In July 2019 Warren returns after Sienna attempts to kidnap the twin after identifying them during a hotel stay. Nina Robertson then gives the twin to Warren, and he fires Nina as an au pair and drives away, stating that Sienna will never get the better of him.

Warren returns to the village in 2020, after Sebestian falls ill. He kidnaps Brody to blackmail Sienna into donating her bone marrow to save him. Although Warren agrees to move back to the village so he and Sienna can co-parent the twins, he plans to leave as soon as Sebestian is cured. However, it turns out that because Sienna had chemotherapy due to her cervical cancer, she can no longer donate bone marrow. Warren goes on a search party with Brody and Joel to track down Sienna, but when he ends up at his childhood hometown, he is reminded and opens up to his past that he was bullied by someone called Felix Westwood (Richard Blackwood). Warren calls a truce with Brody and returns to Hollyoaks where he stays at The Dog and starts a casual relationship with Mercedes, leading Warren to then have a feud with Liam Donovan (Jude Monk McGowan), resulting in Warren being hospitalised. Warren awakens and tracks Liam down.

Sienna returns, and Warren gives her a taped confession of the murders he has committed. After seeing Felix for the first time in years, Warren is told that the man Warren looked up to as a child, Cormac Ranger (James Gaddass) had abused Felix in the children home because of his race. Warren vows to help Felix get closure, and with Brody, they arrange a meeting with Cormac. This confrontation turns violent and Warren grievously injures Cromac. He is left in a coma for months before dying from a heart attack. Following Cormac's death, Warren is approached by criminals Brad King (Tom Benedict Knight) and later Fergus Collins (Robert Beck) to carry out illicit activities.

Cormac's death is revisited when his daughter Summer Ranger (Rhiannon Clements) vows revenge for her father's murder. Warren overhears Brody telling Summer that he would confess his and Warren's involvement in Cormac's death in return for her sparing their lives. Warren grabs a car and runs over Brody after he and Sienna escape Summer's plan, and covers his involvement in Brody's murder. Warren's murderous secret is exposed by Fergus after he intercepts an incriminating voicemail, but agrees to keep his secret.

Fergus is angry with Warren, who refuses to help him with his illegal jobs. Warren reminds Fergus that he is top dog and no one orders him around, which prompts Fergus to prove he is just as dangerous as Warren by killing Timmy Simmons (Sam Tutty) with Warren's gun. Warren is forced to help him dispose of the body and they bury him in the woods. Felix learns about Warren and Fergus' crimes, and tries to make Warren see that Fergus is using him. Warren refuses to believe it, and Fergus manipulates him into murdering Felix. Warren refrains after Joel reveals he has been hacking Fergus.

Together with Joel and Felix, Warren learns that Fergus has been using him and is the mastermind of a voyeur network. Fergus succeeds in framing Warren for his crimes but is killed by Maxine when he threatens Trish. Warren is sent to jail when Fergus' lawyer sends evidence of his involvement in Timmy's death. Warren accidentally confesses to Honour Chen-Williams (Vera Chok), his prison therapist, that he murdered Brody, but keeps his secret due to patient confidentiality.

Maxine and Sienna fight to prove Warren's innocence, but he is later released when the police fail to find Timmy's body. An unknown person runs over Warren as revenge, revealed to be Joel, who is sick and tired of his father committing evil acts and getting away with them. Warren vows to change his ways but becomes addicted to painkillers after the hit-and-run. He accepts help from his loved ones, after almost killing his own kids in a fire. Warren beats up Ethan Williams (Matthew James-Bailey) when Ethan attempts to attack Warren as revenge for Warren beating up his nephew Sam Chen-Williams (Matthew McGivern) weeks prior.

Warren meets Norma Crow (Glynis Barber) when she kidnaps Warren's children. Warren's fury and ruthless reputation leaves a positive impression on Norma who wants to recruit Warren to work for her. During this, Sienna discovers Warren killed Brody and plots to kill him. After poisoning and getting the confession out of Warren, he attempts to kill her before he is hit with a wheel wrench by Damon. Warren is rescued by Norma, and Warren later plans to get Sienna back by slowly poisoning her, but changes his mind when Norma sends her hitman Les to kill Sienna.

Warren is happy to see Sienna is okay but realises that Liberty is in danger, Warren saves Liberty by throwing out Les, and he and Sienna have a heated confrontation when Norma intervenes. Warren is told by Norma that she managed to find the hit-and-run driver, and he goes and unknowingly shoots Joel. After Joel lies to the police that he did not see his shooter, Warren decides they are even.

After realising Norma attempted to set him up to kill his own child, Warren kidnaps Norma's associate Godfrey to get Norma's attention. Norma claims it was a misunderstanding, but Warren doubts her when she threatens Joel. Warren confronts Norma and prepares to kill her, and she reveals that she is his estranged biological mother. When one of Norma's contacts from the police arrive and attempts to break the conflict between Warren and Norma. Warren and Norma both fall and are hospitalised.

Warren is later kidnapped by Norma and locked away in a room. He later partners with her and owns half of all her criminal contacts and businesses. Warren later reveals to Felix that he is dying from liver disease caused by his pain killer addiction, and he only agreed to work with Norma so he can take it all from her and watch her suffer due to leaving him in a home. Warren is pleased when Norma offers to get tested to be a match for him, but Warren is told by Norma that she's being threatened by a guy called Turner. Warren who is declining in health enlists the help of Grace when Norma is kidnapped by Turner, who is revealed to be Les. After a struggle Warren kills him.

Warren is told his condition is becoming worse. Despite his health issues Warren wants to take on a job with Grace and double cross a gangster named Angus and take his counterfeit money. Warren locks Grace in the office, and he fights with Angus' men, but the men are scared off by a gunshot from Grace. Warren is rehospitalised.

Joel and Norma are found to not be matches for Warren, though it is later revealed Grace paid off a doctor to fake Norma's test results. Warren learns of Grace's betrayal and threatens her and her loved ones if she does not comply to the demands. Warren punches Ethan when he discovers that he is moving in with Sienna but apologises, but calls a truce with them after apologising for attacking Ethan. After learning of Norma attempting to kidnap the twins to be a new life in another country along with Warren, and he disowns her.

Warren attempts to warn Felix away from falling in love with Mercedes stating that Felix can do better. Warren seemingly accepts Felix's wishes to back off, but Felix's son DeMarcus Westwood (Tomi Ade) asks Warren for help to get his father away from Mercedes, Warren attempts to pay off Mercedes. He later decides to visit her son Bobby Costello (Jayden Fox) to speak with Mercedes, during which he discovers Norma has returned. Warren receives a letter from Norma saying she needs to tell him the truth. He learns that Norma killed his father in self-defence and that he was the reason he was put into care, Warren forgives her and she leaves.

Warren supports DeMarcus after he wants to move to America against his father's wishes. Warren later threatens Sam Chen-Wiliams and his girlfriend, detective Zoe Anderson (Garcia Brown), after Sam plants drugs in his office.

Warren would later discover that he could potentially be the father of a now teenager Ella Richardson (Erin Palmer) due to a one night stand with Mandy Richardson back in late 2006, it is then eventually revealed that Warren is in fact the biological father of Ella after a DNA test and Warren at first doesn't want anything to do with Ella despite Norma's pleas but after seeking comfort from Mercedes, Warren decides to get to know Ella. Warren then grows closer with Mercedes who is in a relationship with his best friend Felix but would ultimately begin sleeping with her despite their best efforts in ending the affair but eventually the affair is revealed during a car crash which sees Mercedes nearly die, during the same crash Ella is accidentally killed by Ste Hay and this devastates Warren who hold Felix responsible, Warren then plans to kill Felix but Felix outsmarts Warren and drugs him and after a scuffle Warren is shot in the shoulder needing medical attention, Warren is furious to learn Mercedes helped Felix escape and after Ella's funeral Warren temporarily leaves the village to go to Spain.

Warren returns weeks later meeting his associate and longtime friend Murphy (Rick S. Carr) who has gotten Warren a visiting order to visit the guy known as Kane (Ben Castle-Gibb) who is currently on remand for Ella's death, Warren confronts Kane and attacks him as its shown Warren's men have been beating Kane up. Warren agrees to get Kane out and off on the charge if he tells him who is responsible for Ella's death, Kane then eventually tells Warren that it was Ste Hay and James Nightingale leading Warren with the help of Murphy to track down and kidnap both Ste and James and confront them after chasing after the pair Warren eventually discovers it was Ste and pushes him off a building but Ste manages to survive the fall, with Ste not dead Warren begins to spiral clashing and attacking many villagers, including Mercedes who eventually phones Freddie Roscoe to protect her however its to no avail as Warren attacks Freddie by punching him and then threatens Mercedes who is pregnant with his child, Warren even gets Ste to work for him and eventually turns on Murphy when Murphy messes up a job to retrieve a confession tape from Sienna who had Warren confess he pushed Ste, as a result Warren orders Ste to kill Murphy however Ste despite telling Warren he did do it, Murphy was let go by Ste and returns some weeks later and Warren is told by Maxine that Murphy has returned, Warren manages to catch up with Murphy and beat him up and then kidnaps him and orders Ste to kill him again however Ste refuses leading to Warren eventually killing Murphy by shooting him dead as he tells a shocked Maxine his dealt with Murphy later putting the money Murphy attempted to steal along with the gun he used in his safe.

Warren begins to sell and import drugs but would soon discover that the pills that he is selling are tainted as he read that two teenagers have died from taking the tainted pills, this panics Warren who gets Ste to help reclaim the pills from each of the dealers selling for Warren, Warren then hopes his gotten all the dodgy pills but it's too late for locals Lizzie Chen-Williams (Lily Best) and Hunter McQueen (Theo Graham) who both die from a cardiac arrest from taking the tainted pills but despite knowing Warren is responsible for Hunter's deaths, Mercedes decides to have a relationship with him as their love for one another proves too strong but Warren soon becomes the target for a notorious gangster known as "Blue" who shoots Warren in the middle of the village but survives. Warren believes Blue is Freddie giving Warren took Fraser Black's (Jesse Birdsall) cash up to 2 million in euros from Freddie, Warren orders Ste and new gangster associate Rex Gallagher (Jonny Labey) to kill Rex however Freddie is saved by Grace but is comatose from secondary drowning. Warren eventually realises that Freddie isn't Blue and as an apology buys Freddie the Love Boat as a home. Warren then suspects Rex as Blue and traps him in a van which he sets on fire leading it to explode thinking it killed Rex, Warren flees the area however Rex survives and tells Blue that Warren attempted to kill him, Blue responds by killing Warren's mother Norma by shooting her dead with a shotgun, Warren doesn't discover Norma until two weeks later which devastates him, Blue then gets Rex to plant the shotgun that he used to kill Norma in Warren's home leading Warren to be arrested by Alistair Banks (Drew Cain) and sent to prison. Warren spends weeks inside but eventually decides to confess to the murder of Norma after Blue kidnaps his and Mercedes' daughter but Warren with the help of Donny Clark (Louis Emerick) manages to break out of prison and attempts to leave with Mercedes and their baby girl but Mercedes is contacted by Cleo who is attempting to escape her abusive partner Abe Fielding (Tyler Conti), Warren agrees to pick up Cleo and meet her at a nearby woodlands, Warren decides to go look for Cleo in the woods but his met with Blue who is Dave Williams (Dominic Power), the father of Lizzie, Warren is stunned to discover that Dave is the gangster, Dave lays off what his plan was watching Warren suffer and go down for killing Norma, the two men then enter into a fist fight which ends in Dave stabbing Warren but as Dave is about to finish off Warren, Warren disarms him and shoots Dave believing he has killed him he tells Mercedes that Dave is Blue but tells her his leaving on his own as the life he leads is to dangerous for Mercedes and their little girl, Warren then hands Mercedes a bag full of cash before being picked up in a van, Warren is then seen opening a bag full of cash laughing.

During the missing year of Hollyoaks, it's revealed in April 2026 (2025 for viewers) that Warren returned to the village after discovering Joel was back on drugs, Warren punches Joel but then speaks to him before attempting to get Arlo Fielding (Dan Hough) to deliver a letter to Mercedes but it's stopped by Freddie Roscoe, Warren then leaves the village believing Mercedes wants nothing to do with him. Warren returns some months later this time in present day after Mercedes finds the letter and contacts him, Warren is told every detail of Mercedes' cancer battle and how she is now in love with Freddie, Warren kisses Mercedes after questioning her who she really loves which is seen by Freddie who walks away, soon after Mercedes rejects Warren. After his brief reunion with Mercedes, Warren bumps into his old enemy in Clare Devine who tried to kill Warren back in May 2009 the pair have a brief intense encounter thinking they were dead. Warren is then arrested by the police who track him down but it's soon seen that Freddie called them as he watches on as Warren is handcuffed but Warren manages to get let off despite being in the run for murder and soon confronts Freddie with armed with a gun revealing he has an inside man who helped him. Warren then forces Freddie to write a suicide note after Warren tells him he has sorted out witnesses to tell the police they spotted Freddie. Warren then watched on as Freddie leaves the village and meets up with Donny who is revealed to be his inside man, Warren then departs the village with Freddie's fate still being somewhat uncertain.

Warren returns again in October 2025 where its revealed he is living on Brookside close with current girlfriend Gemma Johnson (Tisha Merry) as its revealed that Donny (Louis Emerick) is in fact Mick Johnson who is Gemma's father, Warren is shocked by this but their brief reunion is cut short when two armed gangsters, Griff Farnage (Nathan Hubble) and Connor Sullivan (Harry French) approach to kill them the three managed to flee but are tracked down at a safe house, Warren is then tasked to get diamonds he had been importing and its revealed he has rekindled his long time friendship with Theresa and has had her working for him but Theresa give him a fake bag this leads to Warren and Donny chasing Griff and Connor crashing the cars, Donny kills Griff and Warren gets Donny to help him dispose of the body and after realising Gemma's games, Warren ends their relationship and reunites with Mercedes.

It's soon revealed Warren went into investment with Tim O'Leary (Philip Olivier) during his time at Brookside Close but for unknown reasons the investment failed which upset Tim but Warren told him that he was to blame for the failed investment, after speaking further with Tim, Warren manages to book Mercedes into a rehab fertility to get her help over her pill addiction addiction Warren is waving Mercedes off he is watched by loan shark Jenson Cole (Ryan Clayton). Warren is soon set up for a robbery of a chocolate shop by both Jenson and Tim but Gemma gives him a false alibi and tells him Tim was behind it after confronting Tim herself, Warren sets out to get Tim and finally catches up with him and delivers a brutal beating to him for crossing him despite the pleas of Tim's girlfriend Nikki Shadwick (Suzanne Collins) for Warren to stop, Warren is eventually stopped by some security guards as Jenson watches on. Warren is then seen being watched by Jenson who vows to want to make him "burn" while on the phone to an unknown individual setting out revenge on Warren.

During the time that Mercedes and Gemma agree to both date Warren, much to Warren's surprise and enjoyment, it was soon revealed that after Warren tracked down and kidnapped Jenson that Jenson was Warren's half-brother sharing the same father. Tensions boil between the two men into a fight that leads to Warren being knocked out by Jenson after regaining consciousness Warren finally begins to accept that he has a brother and agrees to have Jenson help him run The Loft Nightclub, Warren then introduces Jenson to Mercedes unaware that the pair have already met and had a romance. Warren and Jenson clash over Mercedes after Mercedes breifly dates Jenson but after many bust ups Warren finally reunites with Mercedes.

Sebastian's leukemia returns and Warren sees no option but to turn to Jenson for help and it turns out that Jenson is a match for Sebastian's transplant but unbeknownst to Warren Jenson has been caught up in a gang led by Gemma who kidnap Jenson, Warren is led to believe that Jenson abandoned Sebastian so sets out to kill him with Prince McQueen (Malique Thompson-Dwyer) following and despite Prince's efforts to talk Warren down from shoot Jenson, Warren grabs the gun from Prince ans ruthlessly guns down a tied up and gagged Jenson with a bag over his head killing him, however it would in fact turn out the guy who Warren actually shot and killed was in fact one of Gemma's associates called Billy who both Gemma and Jenson knicked out Billy and hand changed his clothes around with Jensons, Warren eventually discovers that he killed the wrong guy after feeling guilty and confessing to Mercedes but after being outed of killing Jenson by Imran Maalik (Ijaz Rana) during his wedding to Leah Barnes (Charlotte Riley) however Jenson suprisengly shows up stunning everyone. Warren also discovers that Prince was set out to kill him over Hunter's death two years prior however after Warren, Prince and Jenson all sat and talked all three called a truce and agreed to move on but it is soon revealed unbeknownst to Warren that Jenson is secretly a uncover copper trying to take him down.

== Reception ==
In 2007, Warren was voted as the show's "Favourite Male Character" at the Hollyoaks Awards. During The British Soap Awards, Lomas was nominated for several awards for his portrayal of the character, including "Sexiest Male" in 2008, "Villain of the Year" in 2007, 2008, 2009 and 2011 and "Best Actor" in 2008 and 2009. He has also been nominated at the Inside Soap Awards for "Best Bad Boy" in 2007 and 2008 and also "Best Actor" in 2009. The character was selected as one of the "top 100 British soap characters" by industry experts for a poll to be run by What's on TV, with readers able to vote for their favorite character to discover "Who is Soap's greatest Legend?" In August 2017, Lomas was long-listed for Best Actor and Best Bad Boy at the Inside Soap Awards. Lomas made the viewer-voted shortlist for the Best Bad Boy accolade, but lost out to Connor McIntyre, who portrays Pat Phelan in Coronation Street. In 2021, he was longlisted for "Best Villain" at the Inside Soap Awards for his role as Warren. In July 2024, Lomas went onto win Best Actor in a Television series for his portrayl of Warren at the 2024 National Film Awards

Ruth Deller of entertainment website Lowculture has often criticized Warren; in one feature she slammed his final storylines stating: "Apparently he's still around and there's some tedious and unlikely 'romance' between him and Sasha. Oh, and he's bedded Swimbint (Sarah Barnes) for good measure. Really, didn't this character's point expire about two years ago now?"

Gareth McLean of Radio Times has been critical of Warren stating: "There are many bad apples in Hollyoaks, but only one that's rotten to the core. Warren Fox has caused so much misery to so many people – Russ, Mercedes, Ste, Cindy, the Barneses, the Deans and don't forget Justin – it's a wonder the villagers haven't ganged up, Murder on the Orient Express-style, and offed him."
