= Gemma Johnson =

Fictional character from Brookside and Hollyoaks

- Brookside and Hollyoaks character
- Tisha Merry as Gemma (2025)
- Portrayed by: Naomi Kamanga (1990–1998); Carla Jarrett (1998–2000); Tisha Merry (2025–present)
- Duration: 1990–2000, 2025–present
- First appearance: 26 March 1990 (Brookside); 13 October 2025 (Hollyoaks)
- Last appearance: 23 February 2000 (Brookside)
- Introduced by: Phil Redmond (1990); Hannah Cheers (2025)
- Spin-off appearances: Hollyoaks Later (2025)
In-universe information
- Occupation: Doctor
- Father: Mick Johnson
- Mother: Josie Johnson
- Brothers: Leo Johnson
- Half-brothers: Andre Clark
- Half-sisters: Vicky Grant
- Grandfathers: Ben Christie
- Grandmothers: Rachel Christie
- Uncles: Ellis Johnson
- Other relatives: Jerome Johnson

Gemma Johnson is a fictional character from the British soap operas Brookside and Hollyoaks, played by Tisha Merry. The character made her first appearance during the Brookside episode airing on 26 March 1990. Gemma was previously portrayed by Naomi Kamanga from 1990 until 1998 and Carla Jarrett from 1998 until 2000, in Brookside. Merry took over the role when the character was introduced into Hollyoaks in 2025. Gemma is initially characterised as a "naturally playful and inquisitive" child. She is introduced as the daughter of Mick Johnson (Louis Emerick) and Josie Johnson (Suzanne Packer) and is the sibling of Leo Johnson (Leeon Sawyer/Steven Cole). Packer left Brookside but Gemma and Leo remained in the series and Mick takes on the role of a single parent. One of Gemma's early stories featured her nearly drowning in a pond and writers made her centric to a missing child storyline. Producer Mal Young created a steroid addiction storyline for Mick and explored how it affects his children, as they become fearful of their usually kind father. Kamanga decided to leave in 1998, to focus on her studies and producers immediately recast the role to Jarrett. Writers then began to involve Gemma in more prominent teenage storylines. In 1999, they portrayed drug-related issues via Gemma. First she is deported from her holiday in Barbados after smoking cannabis. Then Gemma takes ecstasy, collapses and is hospitalised. Packer reprised her role as Josie to facilitate Gemma's departure from Brookside in February 2000. She decides to move away with Josie and leaves Mick devastated.

Gemma was introduced into Hollyoaks in 2025 via a cross-over episode featuring Brookside and Hollyoaks characters. It formed part of Hollyoaks' 30th anniversary. Merry's casting was announced via Lime Pictures, who kept the character's actual identity a secret until the episodes were broadcast. The Hollyoaks character, Donny Clark, was revealed to be Mick and he is reunited with Gemma. Merry also appeared as Gemma in Hollyoaks Later. The writers created a relationship for Gemma with gangster character Warren Fox (Jamie Lomas) and also affiliated her with another gangster character, Froggy Black (John Middleton). Merry described Gemma's revised characterisation as flirty, feisty and someone that people would not want to make an enemy of. Gemma's teenage antics garnered critique in television reviews and she was labelled a "wild child" and "wayward" character. An Inside Soap columnist assessed that Gemma had grown into a "sly" character.

== Development ==
=== Early characterisation and stories ===
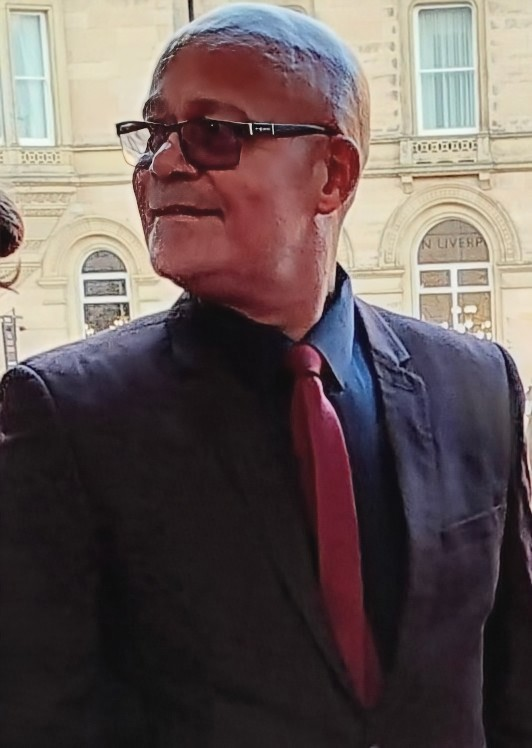
Louis Emerick (pictured) plays Gemma's father, Mick Johnson.

Gemma was originally played by child actress Naomi Kamanga when she was aged three. Kamanga made her first appearance as Gemma during the episode broadcast on 26 March 1990. Gemma is introduced into Brookside as the daughter of established character Mick Johnson (Louis Emerick). She arrives with her mother, Josie Johnson (Suzanne Packer) and her brother, Leo Johnson (Leeon Sawyer), to stay with Mick in Liverpool. In their backstory, Mick walked out on his family after discovering that Josie had an affair with Tony. Mick agrees to reconcile with Josie and they attempt to live together as a family once again at 6 Brookside Close.

Gemma is originally characterised as a "naturally playful and inquisitive" child. Writers also portrayed her as "a quiet, polite girl" during Kamanga's tenure in the role. Gemma is also shown to be a "happy" and "contented" child. They created a good sibling relationship between Gemma and Leo, who behaves as a "loving brother" towards her. Mick was portrayed as a father who "adored" his children.

Her early storylines include nearly drowning in her garden pond. Gemma falls into the water and is saved by Geoff Rogers (Kevin Carson), who finds her lifeless, face down in the pond and manages to resuscitate her. Writers also created a missing child plot featuring Gemma, in which she goes missing for days leaving Mick in fear, but she is later found safe. The storyline was broadcast in July 1991, when Gemma was aged five in the series. Mick and Josie's marriage ultimately fails again and she leaves to reconcile with Tony. This time she leaves Gemma and Leo in Mick's care. In another storyline, Josie's parents, Ben Christie (Jeff Diamond) and Rachel Christie (Angela Brinkworth) arrive and Gemma's uncle, Ellis Johnson (Francis Johnson) becomes suspicious of the Christie's motives for visiting. When Mick leaves Gemma and Leo alone with Ben and Rachel, they abscond with their grandchildren, taking them to live in Cardiff. Mick later travels to Wales to retrieve them and returns them home.

In 1995, writers created an issue-led storyline for the Johnson family. Mick becomes addicted to taking steroids and they portrayed Gemma and Leo as being fearful of Mick during this storyline. Brookside producer, Mal Young wanted his show to explore a different type of drug addiction storyline to that they had previously played via Jimmy Corkhill (Dean Sullivan). He believed that Jimmy was the typical character to portray addiction whereas Mick, a protective father, was more impactful. He also wanted to portray the effects it has only the addict's family and how Mick copes as a single parent. Mick's addiction causes him to take his moods out on Gemma and Leo. Young explained that "the fact is he's over protective towards Leo and Gemma. He tries to over compensate for his ex-wife Josie not being there. As a result, his expectations of them and indeed himself are far too high. But because he's basically a nice guy, to see him lash out at his kids has a bigger impact than if, say, Jimmy did. You don't expect it from Mick."

=== Recast, drugs and departure ===
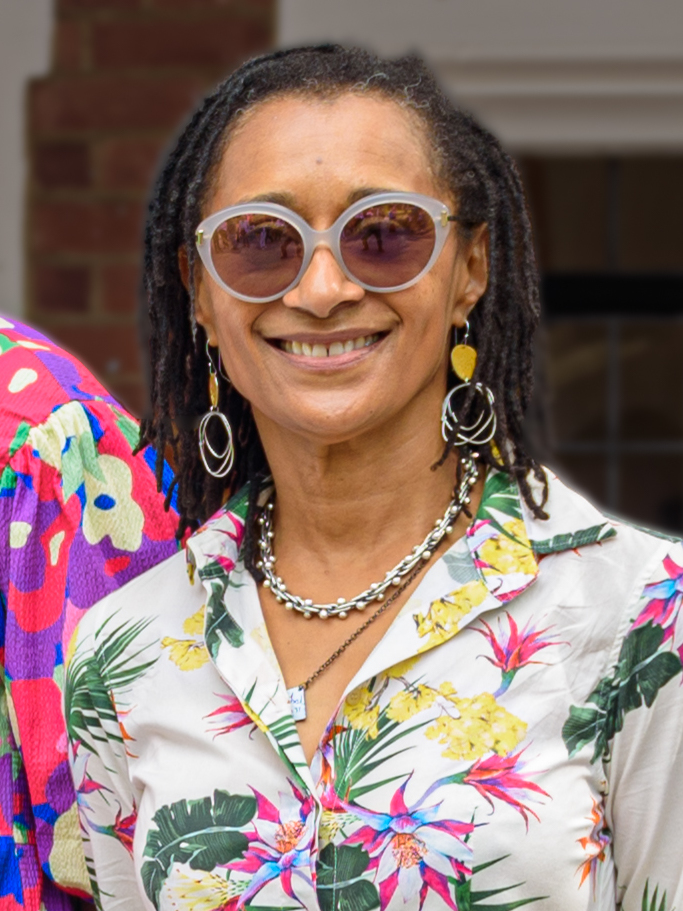
Suzanne Packer (pictured) reprised her role as Gemma's mother, Josie Johnson, to facilitate Gemma's Brookside departure.

On 30 July 1998, it was announced that Kamanga would be leaving the role. It was falsely reported in the British media that Brookside producers had decided to recast the character because Kamanga did not suit the storylines they had planned. Brookside's press office denied the claims and revealed that Kamanga's mother had decided that she should concentrate on her education. Of her decision to leave, Kamanga told Felicity Newson from Liverpool Echo that "I've had a really happy time doing Brookside, it's all been fun - and it's been like having a second family to me." She added that she came to the realisation that "I can't have a proper education and carry on playing the part of Gemma as well." It was confirmed that Brookside's casting department were already holding auditions for a new actress to play Gemma to take over the role from September. Kamanga last played Gemma during the episode broadcast on 17 July 1998. Carla Jarrett took over the role from 16 September 1998. Polly Graham from Daily Mirror reported that writers planned to make Gemma a more prominent character within the show's teenage characters. She added she would become a "fully-fledged teenage rebel."

In December 1999, writers gave the character storylines involving drugs. The story begins when Gemma goes on holiday to Barbados with her friend Caroline. She later contacts Mick and reveals she has been deported from Barbados for smoking cannabis. During Brookside's New Year's Eve episode, Gemma goes clubbing at The Millennium Club and takes ecstasy. Gemma collapses as a result and is hospitalised.

In 2000, Packer reprised her role as Josie for a guest stint. A Brookside publicist told Wendy Granditer from Inside Soap that Josie's return would give viewers "a few surprises". When Josie returns she confronts Mick about Gemma's drug taking. Josie criticises Mick's parenting of their children and vows to take over. Writers played Gemma as "pleased" to have her mother around again but Leo is not. Mick becomes suspicious of Josie's motives for returning and takes her out for a meal to talk. Josie then attempts to seduce Mick despite her being remarried and Mick orders her to leave. Josie retaliates by vowing to fight for custody of their children. Gemma decides she wants to live with Josie and Mick is "devastated". Emerick told reporters from TV Choice that Mick feels "a bitterness" about Josie's return but "he knows living with her mum would be a big adventure for a 13-year-old." Emerick added that Leo is "really supportive" of Mick throughout the ordeal but "he's very hurt by Gemma's decision." In her final Brookside storyline, Gemma leaves to live with Josie and Jarrett made her final appearance during the episode broadcast on 23 February 2000.

=== Introduction into Hollyoaks ===
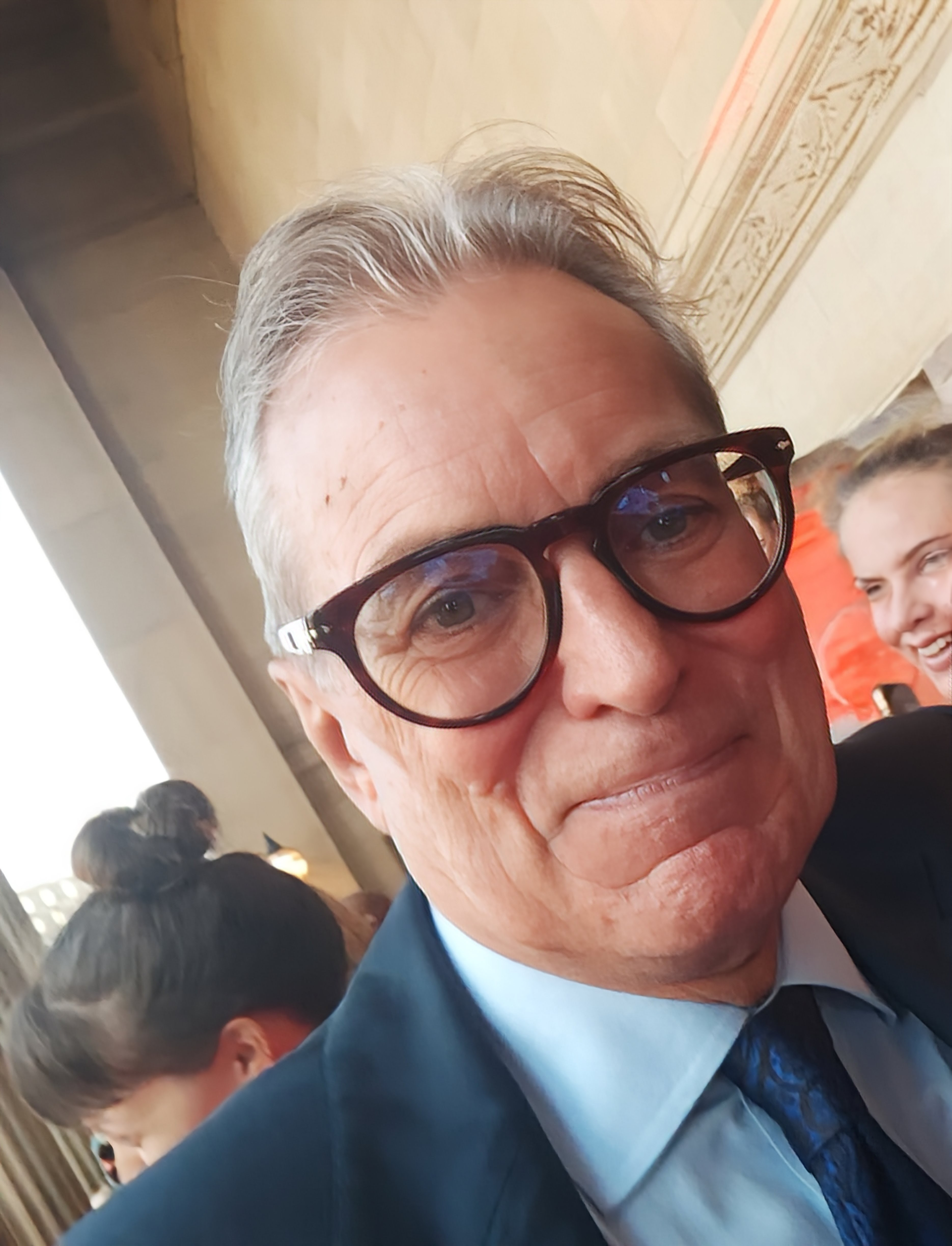
Writers featured Gemma in storylines involving gangster, Froggy Black, played by John Middleton (pictured).

On 28 July 2025, Lime Pictures announced that Tisha Merry had been cast in their soap opera, Hollyoaks, playing the character of Gemma. It was also confirmed that Gemma would be a series regular character. They planned to feature Gemma in a new episode of the show's spin-off series, Hollyoaks Later before her transition into the show's main episodes. They added that Gemma would appear on-screen alongside Warren Fox (Jamie Lomas). Lime Pictures did not confirm Gemma's connection to the show's existing characters beyond her involvement with Warren. They also did not publish Gemma's surname in the casting announcement. A Channel 4 press release confirmed that the episode of Hollyoaks later would be filmed on-location and facilitate Gemma's introduction into the main series. Merry's management, McLean-Williams Ltd confirmed that Merry was cast by Lime Pictures head of casting, Peter Hunt. Merry described Gemma as being a "bold" and "unpredictable" character. She is "flirty, feisty, and the kind of woman you'd want as your best friend... but never your enemy." Executive producer, Hannah Cheers told Merry that Gemma is "always professional" but has "a devious side about her". Cheers also wanted Gemma to be "flirtatious" and able to manipulate the show's male characters. Merry recalled being drawn to Gemma's wardrobe because "nothings out of place, heels all the time, perfect hair and make-up!" Merry also teased Gemma's arrival in Hollyoaks, adding "trust me when I say, she'll be entering with a bang. I can't wait for you all to meet her." The following month, Channel 4 announced a special cross-over episode of Brookside and Hollyoaks to commemorate the latter's 30th anniversary. Merry made her first appearance as Gemma during the Hollyoaks episode broadcast on 13 October 2025. Her first scene featured Gemma erasing a voicemail message from Warren's phone that was left by his ex-girlfriend, Mercedes McQueen (Jennifer Metcalfe). She then proceeds to lie to Warren about the call and seduces him.

Her next appearance occurred during the Hollyoaks and Brookside crossover episode and Gemma was confirmed to be the same character that had previously featured in Brookside. The scene also revealed that the Hollyoaks character Donny Clark (also played by Emerick) was actually Gemma's father, Mick Johnson. Writers featured Gemma prominently in the episode of Hollyoaks Later. Gemma is confirmed to be in a relationship with Warren. Gemma and Mick are taken hostage by Connor "Sully" Sullivan (Harry French) and Griff Farnedge (Nathan Hubble) and they demand a ransom from Warren. They also capture Dodger Savage (Danny Mac), with Griff beating and raping him. The episode concludes with Gemma's involvement in staging the situation in an attempt to rob Warren of his fortune. Writers added more surprises for its audience during Gemma's introductory weeks on the show. She was revealed to be working for the notorious gangster, Froggy Black (John Middleton). Mick explains to Gemma that he faked his own death because of the danger Froggy posed to his family. The episode also detailed that Gemma was seeking revenge against Mick. In another episode, Gemma is featured feeding information back to Froggy and Sully. Mick informs Gemma that Sully is a police officer and nearly confesses to murdering Griff. Gemma suspects that Mick knows more about Griff's disappearance and informs Froggy. She then telephones Griff but Warren has his phone and discovers that Gemma is involved in the scam.

An Inside Soap reporter revealed that Gemma would then try to befriend Mercedes after becoming jealous of her involvement with Warren. Writers played Gemma hatching a plan to ruin Mercedes life and snare Warren back. Merry told Louisa Riley from Inside Soap that Gemma "welcomes the challenge" to break-up Mercedes and Warren. Merry did not believe that Gemma felt threatened by Mercedes, despite her history with Warren because Gemma is that confident in herself. Merry added "if Gemma wants something, she'll get it. She's very headstrong and is a woman like we've never met before." Gemma then begins to manipulate Diane Hutchinson (Alex Fletcher) to help her scheme against Mercedes. Merry believed that despite Gemma liking Diane, she sees an opportunity and ends up "using her". She noted that Diane wants Mercedes gone because she had an affair with her husband, Tony Hutchinson (Nick Pickard). Merry believed that Gemma could be "dangerous" for Mercedes but she did not think Gemma is an evil character. Instead, she reasoned that Gemma is capable of "getting rid of someone in a way that's not too catastrophic". Merry revealed that writers planned to explore Gemma and Mick's relationship once again. She described plots that feature the duo discussing things and secrets being revealed. She concluded "there are some wonderful moments, father and daughter stuff. It's been really cool to play that out and explore their relationship."

== Reception ==
In 1995, author Geoff Tibballs wrote that despite the initial "odd hiccups" in their behaviour, Gemma and Leo both became "a tribute to Mick's abilities as a single parent." Gemma, played Jarrett, proved unpopular with Miranda Holman from Dorset Echo who criticised the character's "whinging", writing "Gemma has to be killed off in some freak whinging accident. Her voice could turn milk." Holman conjured up her ideal Gemma exit, requesting that writers see the character is crushed by a falling chandelier during the next instance of her whining. By 2000, an All About Soap reporter assessed that Gemma had become a "wayward" character. A Soaplife journalist agreed and added that "poor Mick's shelled out a fortune for his daughter's private education, and yet it seems that little Gemma's grown into something of a wild child." Another believed Mick was unhappy that Gemma returned to study at Brookside comprehensive school. They also pondered "might Gemma's days of being a daddy's girl be over?"

In February 2000, Inside Soap published a feature profiling the "biggest brats" in soap operas and included Gemma. They assessed that Gemma was originally portrayed as "sweet, gentle and kind" but her stint at boarding school transformed her into a "pot-smoking, ecstasy-popping nightmare". They branded her "most malicious moment" as being her ruining her father's new year by taking drugs and threatening to leave if she has to return to comprehensive school. The reporter blamed Josie's absence as the root cause of Gemma's bad behaviour, noting she missed Gemma's formative years. Though they noted that "good dad" Mick's steroid addiction did not help Gemma's situation. They concluded it was a "fat chance" she would change her ways, noting "Gemma's plan of action seems to be to milk Mick's guilt - and wallet - for all she can get." A Hartlepool Mail critic chose the episode focused on the negative reaction from Gemma's school regarding her drug taking in their "pick of the day" feature. They added that despite being Brookside's "nicest bloke", Mick has "doesn't have much luck when it comes to his children." They concluded that Mick would soon forget Gemma's "trials and tribulations" once Josie returned. Jim Shelley writing for The Guardian lambasted Gemma and Leo as Mick's "pig ignorant kids". He also criticised Mick's hypocritical reaction to Gemma's ecstasy storyline, noting he had previously been addicted to steroids.

In 2025, Digital Spy's Erin Zammitt was surprised by Gemma's introductory plots in Hollyoaks. She branded Gemma working for Froggy and Sully being revealed as his son as "game-changing secrets" which made an "unexpected cliffhanger". Similarly, she wrote that Warren discovering the truth about Gemma was a "game-changing Gemma twist" and "shock cliffhanger". By November 2025, an Inside Soap reporter decided that Gemma had become a "sly" character. For her portrayal of Gemma, Merry was nominated in the category of "Soaps - Best New Casting" at the 2025 Digital Spy Reader Awards. Laura-Jayne Tyler from Inside Soap chose Gemma as one of her four "Unsung Heroes" of British soap opera characters in 2025, calling Gemma a "Hollyoaks firecracker". The following month, Tyler's colleague, Chloe Timms, praised Gemma for "stitching up evil Sully", commenting, "what a character she's shaping up to be!"
