= Ryan Clayton =

English actor (born 1992 or 1993)

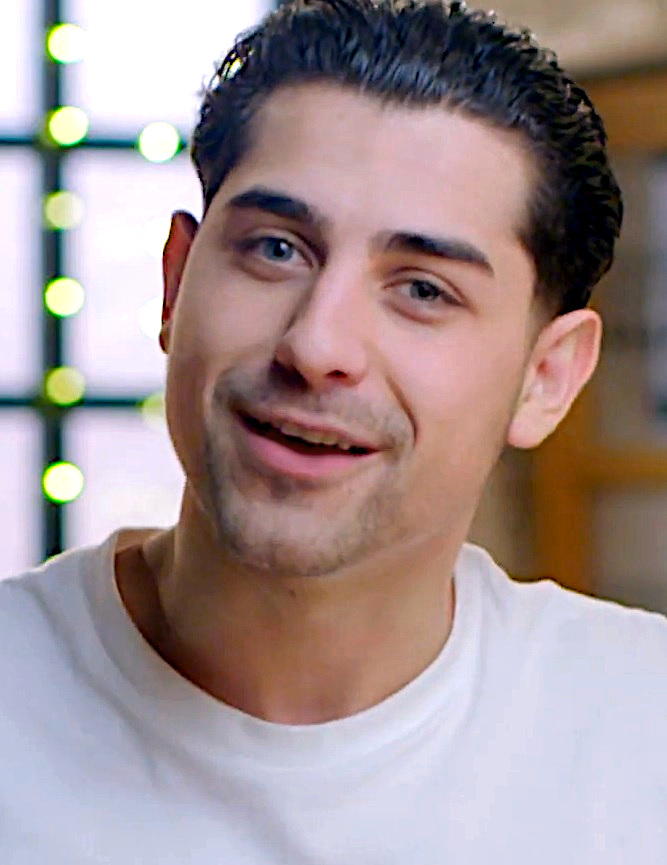
- Ryan Clayton in 2018
- Born: 1993 or 1992 (age 33–34); Manchester, England, UK
- Education: Academy of Live and Recorded Arts
- Occupation: Actor
- Years active: 2011–present
- Television: Coronation Street; Waterloo Road; Hollyoaks

Ryan Clayton (born 1992 or 1993) is an English actor. Born and raised in Manchester, he is known for his roles as Josh Tucker in Coronation Street between 2018 and 2020 and Mike Rutherford in Waterloo Road between 2023 and 2026. For his role in Coronation Street, he was longlisted for "Best Bad Boy" at the 2018 Inside Soap Awards. He has also had guest appearances in Exile and Young Dracula. In January 2026, it was announced that he had joined the cast of Hollyoaks as Jenson Cole.

== Early and personal life ==
Ryan Clayton was born in 1992 or 1993 in Manchester. He grew up in Hyde, Greater Manchester. He described himself as being a "class clown" and "little terror" when he was in school. He developed an interest in acting when he was 17 years old. He graduated from Academy of Live and Recorded Arts North in 2015 with a BA in acting, having started in 2012. Clayton announced in 2023 that he had been diagnosed with attention deficit hyperactivity disorder, a diagnosis which took two years. Clayton has been boxing since he was 11 years old and was a fan of Muhammad Ali. He supports Manchester City F.C..

== Career ==
Clayton has portrayed various villains in productions, which he joked may be because of his eyes or hair. Clayton was part of the television series Exile, where he worked with actor John Simm, who inspired Clayton. Clayton commented in 2018 that he aims to act in more British dramas. Clayton was in the television series Young Dracula.

In January 2018, it was reported that Clayton would portray Josh Tucker in the British soap opera Coronation Street as part of a male rape storyline. Clayton had watched the soap opera when he was younger. Clayton told the BBC that it was important to portray the issue of male rape and worked with a male survivor of rape on the storyline. For his role as Josh, Clayton was longlisted for "Best Bad Boy" at the 2018 Inside Soap Awards. Laura Morgan from Digital Spy assumed that Clayton's Coronation Street role would throw him "into the spotlight", adding, "what a way to begin your career".

Clayton departed at the end of his initial stint and the character's exit aired on 1 October 2018. Clayton called being on the soap an "honour". He returned for another stint in 2019, with his return airing in October of that year. Clayton was watching a film about Manchester City at the cinema when he got the call to return, and he thought it was "really nice" to be asked for another stint. He did not find it difficult to get back into the character and considered some of his scenes to be the best that he had filmed in the soap. Clayton's final appearance as Josh aired in January 2020, when Josh faced prison for his rapes.

In February 2022, it was reported that Clayton would join the cast of the new series of Waterloo Road. He played police sergeant Mike Rutherford, which he continued to play into the show's 16th season in 2025. Of joining the show, Clayton explained that he felt that he needed to be part of it as he is from Manchester and the show was returning to Manchester. He believed that the show was "capturing that essence" of being in a Manchester school as it reminded him of what people were like when he was in school. Clayton and his co-star James Baxter did research into the impacts of fostering children on relationships for their storyline.

In January 2026, it was announced that Clayton had joined the cast of the soap opera Hollyoaks as Jenson Cole. He was introduced as a love interest for established character Mercedes McQueen (Jennifer Metcalfe), who he meets at a rehabilitation facility. Clayton revealed in an interview that Hollyoaks contacted him to ask if he was interested in joining the soap. Clayton's debut as Jenson was in the episode originally released on 27 January 2026.

== Filmography ==
Year	Title	Role	Notes	Ref.
Unknown	Young Dracula	—N/a	—N/a	
2011	Exile	—N/a	Television series	
2018–20	Coronation Street	Josh Tucker	Regular role	
2023–26	Waterloo Road	Mike Rutherford	Series 11–17	
2026	Hollyoaks	Jenson Cole	Regular role	

== Awards and nominations ==
List of acting awards and nominations
Year	Award	Category	Title	Result	Ref.
2018	Inside Soap Awards	Best Bad Boy	Coronation Street	Longlisted	
