= Tisha Merry =

English actress

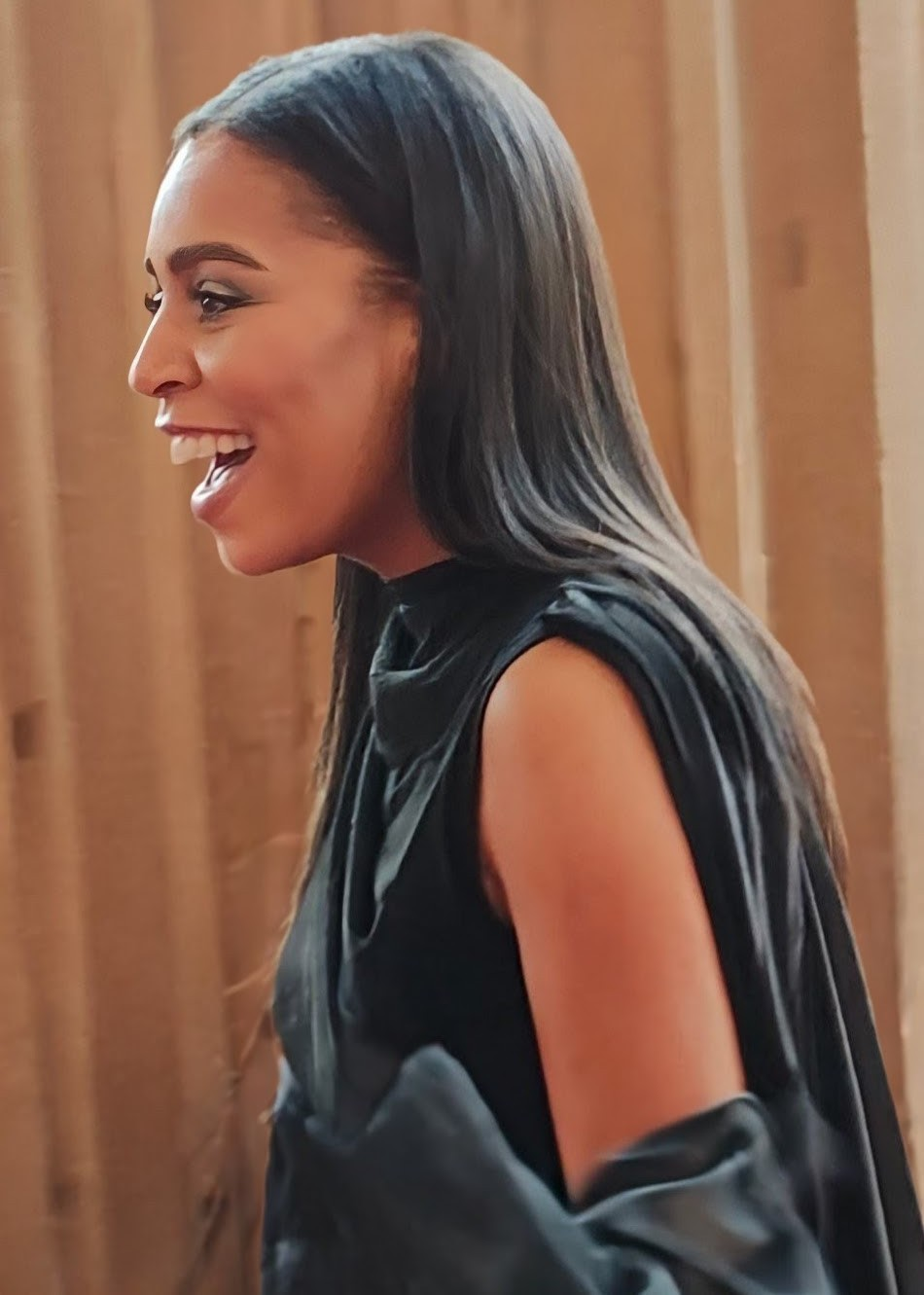
- Occupation: Actress
- Years active: 2010–present

Tisha Merry is an English actress. Merry began her career with playing Charlie in the short film, Mam and a role in the British drama series, 32 Brinkburn Street. In 2013, she made her film debut as Candio in Tamla Rose and secured the role of Steph Britton in the British soap opera Coronation Street. Merry left the series in 2016 and made guest appearances in 2018. She then took roles in the soap opera, Doctors and the children's television series, Princess Mirror-Belle and Odd Squad. In 2025, Merry took on the role of Gemma Johnson in Hollyoaks. The character had previously been a part of another soap opera, Brookside. In addition to acting, Merry has carried out charity work and become a patron of organisations.

== Career ==
In 2010, Merry played the role of Charlie in the short film, Mam. On 28 March 2011, Merry appeared in the role of Poppy, in the BBC drama series, 32 Brinkburn Street. Merry later secured the role of Candio in the 2013 film, Tamla Rose. She plays a character in a girl band, the Tamla Roses. In February 2013, Merry made her first appearance as Steph Britton in the soap opera, Coronation Street, a character initially introduced as a friend of the established character, Katy Armstrong (Georgia May Foote). In December 2016, it was publicised that Merry left had left the series and already filmed her final scenes. Her character left the show the following year. Merry returned to filming as Steph in late 2017 for a guest stint that was broadcast in 2018.

In 2022, Merry was cast in the children's television series, Princess Mirror-Belle, playing a teacher, Mrs. Buckle. She also played the role of Amy in Cherwell Production's short film, Cheese and Onion. In 2023, Merry played the character of Serena Bradley in the BBC soap opera, Doctors in the episode broadcast on 4 September. In 2024, Merry joined the cast of the children's live action show, Odd Squad in its fourth series, playing the role The Trifler.

In 2025, Merry joined the cast of the soap opera, Hollyoaks, playing the character of Gemma Johnson. Her casting was announced by Lime Pictures, who confirmed she was a regular cast member. She also played Gemma in the show's spin-off series, Hollyoaks Later. The character had previously been a part of the fellow soap opera, Brookside. Hollyoaks' executive producer, Hannah Cheers informed Merry that Gemma would now be portrayed as a flirty, devious and manipulative character. Merry was introduced into the series via a special Hollyoaks and Brookside cross-over episode.

== Personal life ==
Merry is the daughter of Michelle Merry and grew up in Preston near, Lostock Hall, where she attended the Balshaw's CE High School. She gained professional training at the Meladrama acting school in Preston and she later became a patron. Merry was in a five-year relationship with fellow actor, Alan Halsall until they separated in 2024. She is a patron of the charity, St Catherine's Hospice. Merry had previously took part in the charity's Moonlight and Memories Walk event in honour of her grandfather, who was cared for on one of the charity's hospice units. Merry has also raised money for The Joshua Wilson Brain Tumour Charity.

== Filmography ==
Year	Title	Role	Notes
2010	Mam	Charlie	Short film
2011	32 Brinkburn Street	Poppy	Recurring role
2013	Tamla Rose	Candio	Film role
2013–2018	Coronation Street	Steph Britton	Regular role
2022	Princess Mirror-Belle	Mrs. Buckle	Guest role
2022	Cheese and Onion	Amy	Short film
2023	Doctors	Serena Bradley	Guest role
2024	Odd Squad	The Trifler	Guest role
2025–	Hollyoaks	Gemma Johnson	Regular role
2025	Hollyoaks Later	Gemma Johnson	Regular role
