= List of Hollyoaks characters introduced in 2001 =

The following is a list of characters that first appeared on the Channel 4 soap opera Hollyoaks in 2001, by first appearance. The year saw the introduction of many new characters including the Hunter family.

== Theo Sankofa ==
Theo Sanfoka
- Hollyoaks character
- Portrayed by: Andrew Somerville
- Duration: 2001–2002
- First appearance: 8 January 2001
- Last appearance: 14 November 2002
- Introduced by: Jo Hallows
In-universe information
- Mother: Julie Sankofa
- Brothers: Norman Sankofa
- Sisters: Carrie Sankofa
- Daughters: Judy Sankofa

Theo Sankofa, played by Andrew Somerville, appeared from 2001 to 2002. Somerville was cast in the Hollyoaks: On the Pull campaign to find new young actors to appear in the show. The other three chosen were Marcus Patric (Ben Davies), Lesley Johnston (Laura Burns) and Elize du Toit (Izzy Cornwell).

Theo moves to Hollyoaks where he set up the village's first gadget shop, Theologic, which supplies strange devices. Friendly and well-liked, Theo is someone who the residents of Hollyoaks come to for advice and help. He often supports and advises his friends, including Chloe Bruce (Mikyla Dodd) and Matt Musgrove (Kristian Ealey). Theo also plays a key part in helping Gordon Cunningham (Bernard Latham) in winning the local elections as his campaigner.

Theologic begins taking little profit, which leads Theo into selling the business and moving into the Hunter's caravan park. With crippling debts ahead and not much money available, Theo struggles with money problems. Theo, alongside friends, heads for a potholing trip which turns into a disaster. During a rock fall, Theo dies in the van the group is using.

== Brian Drake ==
Brian Drake
- Hollyoaks character
- Portrayed by: Jonathan Le Billon
- Duration: 2001–2003
- First appearance: 11 January 2001
- Last appearance: 23 January 2003

Brian Drake played by Jonathan Le Billon, made his first appearance 11 January 2001.

Brian is a goth who dates Zara Morgan (Kelly Condron). He is very religious and Zara pressures him to have sex, though they do not have sex. He cheats on her with Steph Dean (Carley Stenson) at a party at Tony Hutchinson (Nick Pickard)'s house. Brian became friends with Lisa Hunter (Gemma Atkinson) and asks her to sing in his band. They end up going out. When Brian finds out about Lisa's self-harming, he tries to help. In helping Lisa he neglects his revision and fails his GCSEs. Brian then stalks Lisa with threatening text messages. Lisa at first thinks it is Steph, but when she discovers Brian is the culprit, he leaves the village.

== Abby Davies ==
Abby Davies, played by Helen Noble, first appeared on 1 March 2001. Noble originally auditioned for the role of Jess Holt but was unsuccessful. Producers later contacted Noble and asked her to audition for the role of Abby instead. Abby is introduced as a member of the Davies family consisting of her brother, Ben Davies (Marcus Patric) and their father, Will Davies (Barny Clevely). Noble revealed that Abby is "not at all" like Ben, who is more interested in "staying in his dad's good books" and refuses to side with Abby on family issues.

Davies described Abby as a "fun character, very likeable, very girlie, a little bit ditzy and silly." Noble believed that Abby has a big imagination" who has "very high hopes for herself and her love life." Abby has a unique style but Noble disliked it. She told a reporter from Inside Soap that "[she] is supposed to be a goth/punky kind of person and she used to wear dog collars – but I think they're really ugly. Eventually Abby began to change her appearance. Noble told Kathryn Secretan from Soaplife that Abby's "fashion sense used to be horrible. She used to dress like a punk and I hated it." Writers created a relationship storyline between Abby and fellow student, Lee (Alex Carter). Noble decided to leave Hollyoaks in 2004, but agreed to return in four episodes in 2005. Noble stated that she felt she had changed and was confident in her decision to depart. MSN TV's Lorna Cooper listed Abby as a "forgotten character" of soap opera who is mainly remembered for her "turbulent relationship" with Lee.

== John Stuart ==
John Stuart
- Hollyoaks character
- Portrayed by: Andrew Henderson
- First appearance: 28 March 2001
- Last appearance: 29 August 2001
In-universe information
- Occupation: Lecturer
- Daughters: Daisy Stuart

John Stuart, played by Andrew Henderson, made his first appearance on 28 March 2001. John works as a lecturer at Hollyoaks Community College and begins a relationship with his colleague Ruth Osborne (Terri Dwyer). Writers introduced John's infant daughter, Daisy Stuart but John fails to inform Ruth he has children. Dwyer told Francesca Babb from All About Soap that her character "is shocked" to discover John has a daughter. Dwyer explained that Ruth plans a romantic picnic for John but is annoyed that he brings Daisy along. She described John as "this really nice guy" and Ruth "wants a bit of romance in her life". She views the revelation as a "huge disappointment" but is "shocked" that Daisy is well behaved. John reveals that Daisy needs to sleep in their bed which further annoys Ruth. She "wanted to be the only on John's mind" but Daisy's presence ruins their chance of passion.

Writers planned to jeopardise their romance further, by portraying John ignorant to Ruth's feelings. When John realises that he has upset Ruth, he plans a romantic weekend away. Dwyer told Babb that Ruth is "really excited" but "completely deflated" when she realises he has taken her on his conference weekend. Ruth is unable to spend time with John during work conference hours. Dwyer added that John is "too business-minded" and "won't succumb to her advances". This leaves Ruth wondering if their relationship will work out or whether she is just "wasting her time with John". Henderson made his final appearance as John during the episode broadcast on 29 August 2001.

John is shown working at Hollyoaks Community College. He later has an argument with Dan Hunter (Andrew McNair) regarding campus car parking. John begins dating Ruth after the become close at work. Ruth organises a picnic for John but is surprised when he introduces her to his daughter, Daisy. John reveals that Daisy needs to sleep in their bed, which upsets Ruth. He decides to make amends by taking Ruth to his conference weekend. She is again upset, believing he had planned the weekend solely for them. He continues to concentrate on work which leaves Ruth unsure about their relationship. Just days later, Ruth decides to end their relationship and John moves on.

== Dan Hunter ==
Dan Hunter played by Andy McNair, made his first on-screen appearance on 19 April 2001. McNair was cast in the role in 2001, with Dan being his first professional acting role. He attended two auditions and received the offer to play Dan shortly after. He introduced as part of the show's Hunter family consisting of Dan, his parents Les Hunter (John Graham Davies) and Sally Hunter (Katherine Dow Blyton) and siblings Lisa Hunter (Gemma Atkinson) and Lee Hunter (Alex Carter). McNair has described Dan as "such a prat" and "miserable, a male chauvinist and is constantly angry with everybody." Writers created a feud with his other sister, Ellie Hunter (Sarah Baxendale). She had been missing in Ibiza for some time and unapologetically returned to live with the Hunter family. Other prominent Dan storylines included an illegal rally driving plot and a relationship with Debbie Dean (Jodi Albert). Dan also featured in the late night spin-off series titled Hollyoaks: After Hours. McNair made his finale appearance as Dan during the episode broadcast on 24 December 2004.

== Lisa Hunter ==
Lisa Hunter, played by Gemma Atkinson, made her first appearance on 23 April 2001. The character is noted for her storylines including bullying and self-harming. After her exit from Hollyoaks, Atkinson reprised the role twice in two spin-off series.

== Les Hunter ==
Leslie "Les" Hunter, played by John Graham Davies, made his first appearance on 26 April 2001.

== Lee Hunter ==
Lee Hunter, played by Alex Carter, made his first appearance on 4 July 2001. The youngest son of Les (John Graham Davies) and Sally Hunter (Katherine Dow Blyton), he made his first on-screen appearance on 13 May 2001. The character was described as "wayward", a "cheeky chap" and a "wheeler dealer". Carter announced his decision to quit the serial in 2005 to have more free time, filming his departure scenes in October 2005 and departed on-screen 23 December 2005.

Carter returned to Hollyoaks as a full-time character in September 2010, reintroduced by series producer Paul Marquess, although his comeback scenes aired in internet spin-off Hollyoaks: Freshers. Upon his return, the character has been described as "a tool", "confident" and "arrogant". In May 2011 it was announced Carter had quit again, in order to pursue other projects.

== Jason Cunliffe ==
Jason Cunliffe
- Portrayed by: Alex Reid
- Duration: 2001–2002
- First appearance: 18 July 2001
- Last appearance: 19 December 2002
- Spin-off appearances: Hollyoaks: Indecent Behaviour (2001)
In-universe information
- Occupation: Footballer
- Wife: Geri Hudson (2002)

Jason Cunliffe, played by Alex Reid, first appeared on 18 July 2001 and made his final appearance in 2002. In 2009, a tabloid newspaper reported that Reid was to return to the show, however a spokesperson confirmed that this was "absolute nonsense".

Jason is a footballer who lived the high life and always got what he wanted until he meets Geri Hudson (Joanna Taylor). Geri instantly falls in love with Jason, or rather for his status, and the pair become Hollyoaks' very own 'Posh and Becks'. Geri wants to marry Jason, but Jason had other things on his mind as he oftens has regular affairs with his book publisher, Alyson. He also makes a pass at Geri's rival Izzy Cornwell (Elize du Toit), but Izzy has none of it and tells Geri what happened. Jason admits to Geri, who forgives him.

Geri sees Jason's true colours when he has a night party in his mansion, despite agent Dion telling Jason to recover from his injury. During the night, Jason's team-mate Scott Anderson (Daniel Hyde) attempts to rape Geri and Jason fails to do anything about it. Realising that Jason treats her like a 'trophy', Geri decides to hit him where it hurt the most: in his pocket. Geri threatens Jason for him to marry her, or else she will tell the press what he is really up to. After getting married, Geri throws Jason out of the car, leaving him to realise that she is going to take him for every penny he is worth after what he had put her through. Feeling embarrassed, Jason leaves the village.

Jon O'Brien from Metro called the character a "womanising footballer who got on the wrong side of wife Geri".

== Sally Hunter ==
Sally Hunter, played by Katherine Dow Blyton, made her first appearance on 26 July 2001.

== Harry Fox ==
Harry Fox
- Hollyoaks character
- Portrayed by: Adam Colclough
- Duration: 2001–2004, 2006
- First appearance: 3 September 2001
- Last appearance: 17 April 2006
- Introduced by: Jo Hallows (2001); David Hanson (2006)
- Spin-off appearances: Hollyoaks: Movin' On (2001)
In-universe information
- Occupation: Journalist

Harry Fox, played by Adam Colclough, appeared between 2001 until 2004 and 2006. Harry was a journalist who covered the naked protest by two Il Gnosh staff members in April 2006. Harry interviewed the striking employees, Jessica Harris (Jennifer Biddall) and Olivia Johnson (Rochelle Gadd), with Jessica telling Harry that she and Olivia had been unfairly dismissed whilst Jessica had been hospitalised with meningitis. Harry then had his photographer, Keith, take photographs of the protest, with Gnosh owner Tony Hutchinson (Nick Pickard) trying to block his view. Jessica realised that Harry had planted someone in the restaurant to get details for him, and threw Harry and his "spy" out. However, Harry found an upset Olivia outside and secretly recorded the conversation as she vented to him.

== Louise Bridges ==
Louise Bridges
- Hollyoaks character
- Portrayed by: Abigail Fisher
- First appearance: 3 September 2001
- Last appearance: 23 October 2001
- Introduced by: Jo Hallows
- Spin-off appearances: Hollyoaks: Movin' On (2001)
In-universe information
- Occupation: Store manager
- Father: Bob Bridges

Louise Bridges, played by Abigail Fisher, appeared on Hollyoaks: Movin' On. Louise was the roommate of Ruth Osborne's (Terri Dwyer) schoolfriend Sam Marsden (Sarah Manners), and the manager of a clothing store. Louise's mother was killed in a car accident and her father Bob became an alcoholic, so Louise ended up having to grow up quickly at a young age. Louise was unlucky in love: she first became attracted to co-worker Ritchie, but her supposed friend Tara won him over. She then dated Lewis Richardson (Ben Hull), but struggled when he became self-destructive and they also split.

== Sam Marsden ==
Sam Marsden
- Hollyoaks character
- Portrayed by: Sarah Manners
- First appearance: 3 September 2001
- Last appearance: 23 October 2001
- Introduced by: Jo Hallows
- Spin-off appearances: Hollyoaks: Movin' On (2001)
In-universe information
- Father: Sean Marsden
- Mother: Stella Marsden

Sam Marsden, played by Sarah Manners, appeared on Hollyoaks: Movin' On. Sam is an old school friend of Ruth Osborne (Terri Dwyer) and flatmate of Louise Bridges (Abigail Fisher). Ruth came to stay with Sam and Louise. Sam's carefree nature meant that she was constantly job hunting, eventually enjoying working for a record company and began dating her boss Paul McDermott. However, she was let go as she failed to convince them that she could take the job seriously.

== Becca Dean ==
Rebecca "Becca" Dean (née Hayton), played by Ali Bastian, made her first appearance on 12 September 2001. She made her final appearance on 14 February 2007.

== Jamie Nash ==
Jamie Nash
- Hollyoaks character
- Portrayed by: Stefan Booth
- Duration: 2001–2002
- First appearance: 12 September 2001
- Last appearance: 14 November 2002
- Introduced by: Jo Hallows
In-universe information
- Sisters: Jodie Nash

Jamie Nash, played by Stefan Booth, appeared between 2001 and 2002.

Jamie arrives as a new student at Hollyoaks Community College as a jack-the-lad with a cheeky charm, so when a sexually transmitted disease goes around at college, Jamie gets the blame. Although he is vindicated, he realises the error of his ways and asks for help from sister Jodie (Kate McEnery) to change his ways. This includes running for student president against Chloe Bruce (Mikyla Dodd), and despite winning, he gives the position to her.

Jamie realises that the only one of his affairs that he cares about is Becca Hayton (Ali Bastian). Jamie vows to win Becca back and the pair eventually get together. However, she becomes reinterested in ex-boyfriend Alex Bell (Martino Lazzeri) and dumps Jamie. Jamie eventually gets back with Becca, but while on a potholing trip with his friends, Jamie gets injured. He dies in hospital and a heartbroken Becca, who is pregnant with his baby, decides to have an abortion.

== Eve Crawford ==
Eve Crawford
- Hollyoaks character
- Portrayed by: Natasha Lund
- Duration: 2001–2002
- First appearance: 12 September 2001
- Last appearance: 4 October 2002

Eve Crawford, played by Natasha Lund, made her first appearance on 12 September 2001. Eve is a student at Hollyoaks Community College. She dated Jamie Nash and had a one-night stand with Matt Musgrove, but left the village after Becca Hayton reported Eve for stealing money.

== Jodie Nash ==
Jodie Nash
- Hollyoaks character
- Portrayed by: Kate McEnery
- Duration: 2001–2003
- First appearance: 17 September 2001
- Last appearance: 13 November 2003
- Created by: Jo Hallows
In-universe information
- Brothers: Jamie Nash

Jodie Nash, played by Kate McEnery, made her first appearance during the episode broadcast on 17 September 2001. Jodie arrives in Hollyoaks with best friend Nick O'Connor (Darren Bransford) and brother Jamie Nash (Stefan Booth). She soon becomes the famous 'virgin' of Hollyoaks as her love life is a disaster. She begins to date Max Cunningham (Matt Littler) but nothing further develops. After Jamie dies in an accident during a potholing trip, Jodie struggles to cope and has sex with Nick, who is gay, which confuses him on his own sexuality. She then has a break away from Hollyoaks to clear her head.

She returns reinvented, a far more assertive and flirtatious woman. She decides to remain good friends with Nick and her love life improves. She begins to have one night stands with Max and Jake Dean (Kevin Sacre). However, neither of them work out for Jodie as she set her sights on the unexpected. She begins a relationship with flatmate Kristian Hargreaves (Max Brown), but Jodie later discovers that she has failed her course and has to move back home, leaving Hollyoaks.

== Nick O'Connor ==
Nicholas "Nick" O'Connor, played by Darren Bransford, made his first appearance on 17 September 2001. Nick was one of several characters who were written out of the series during a cast revamp in 2004. Writers created a close friendship between Nick and Jodie Nash (Kate McEnery). He is portrayed as a gay character who is afraid to tell his parents about his sexuality. Bransford made his finale appearance as Nick during the episode broadcast on 3 November 2004.

== Bombhead ==
David "Bombhead" Burke, played by Lee Otway, made his first appearance on 10 October 2001. Initially known as 'David Witherstone', he appeared on the soap between 2001 and 2005. In 2010, Otway reprised the role in online spin-off Hollyoaks: Freshers. The character returned again on 13 January 2011 for two episodes.

== Toby Mills ==
Toby Mills, played by Henry Luxemburg, made his first appearance on 25 October 2001.

== Scott Anderson ==
Scott Anderson, played by Daniel Hyde made his first appearance in Hollyoaks: Indecent Behaviour, which is a spin-off episode filmed for VHS video and DVD release on 17 November 2001. Scott's role in the show is a friend of Jason Cunliffe (Alex Reid), the partner of Geri Hudson (Joanna Taylor). He made his first main series appearance during the episode broadcast on 4 December 2001. Hyde continued to make guest appearances in the show on a recurring basis. He was later promoted to the show's regular cast and Scott's storylines were expanded when he buys The Loft night club. A writer from the official Hollyoaks website described Scott as "ambitious and possessive, Scott has a mean streak that can quickly offend - but when needs be he can easily turn on the charm."

His storylines include being sent to court and cleared for the rape of Beth Morgan (Kate Baines). Writers created a potential romance between Scott and Izzy Cornwell (Elize du Toit) and rivalry for her affections with Ben Davies (Marcus Patric). In February 2004, Hyde announced his departure from the show and filmed his final scenes in March. Scott disappears following the culmination of a feud with Darren Osborne (Ashley Taylor Dawson). He frames Scott for credit card fraud and Scott responds by setting fire to The Loft with them both inside. Scott disappears but continues to threaten Darren whilst off-screen. Hyde reprised the role for two episodes in 2005. He returned on 10 February episode and made his final appearance during the episode broadcast on 11 February 2005 episode. For his portrayal of Scott, Hyde was thrice nominated for the "Villain of the Year" accolade at the British Soap Awards. He was also nominated for "Best Bad Boy" at the 2004 Inside Soap Awards.

== Dion ==
Dion
- Hollyoaks character
- Portrayed by: Gary Webster
- Duration: 2001–2002
- First appearance: 17 November 2001
- Last appearance: 29 January 2002
In-universe information
- Occupation: Football agent

Dion Evans, played by Gary Webster, made his first appearance on17 November 2001. Dion is a football agent who took extreme measures to get what he wanted. Dion was Jason Cunliffe and Scott Anderson’s agent and had to keep the pair in line, making sure that they stayed out of trouble. However the pair did get themselves in deep trouble when they faced serious allegations. Scott had raped Beth Morgan, but in order to protect his reputation, he protested his innocence. But the major worry for Dion was Jason’s wife-to-be, Geri Hudson, who had been treated roughly by Jason and threatened to go to the press unless she received a large payment. Dion was clearly aware that if Jason paid Geri, he knew that would affect his payment as agent and therefore he would have to reach an agreement with Geri. In order to keep Geri sweet, Dion began to date Geri’s mother Jackie and warned Geri that he would tell her mother what she was really up to. Geri had the last laugh, however, after confessing to her mother and then failing to sign a contract agreement on her wedding day with Jason, which allowed Geri to take Jason for every penny he was worth. Dion failed to get what he wanted with Jason but managed to get the better of Beth Morgan during her trial against Scott. Despite Dion’s co-worker Alyson going against him and defending Beth, Scott was found not guilty, leaving Dion to get his own way.

== Alyson ==
Alyson
- Hollyoaks character
- Portrayed by: Sarah Jayne Steed
- Duration: 2001–2002
- First appearance: 17 November 2001
- Last appearance: 31 January 2002
In-universe information
- Occupation: Journalist; Author

Alyson Turner, played by Sarah Jayne Steed, made her first appearance on17 November 2001. Alyson was a journalist and book publisher, and the ex-girlfriend of footballer Jason Cunliffe (Alex Reid). Alyson and Jason began an affair and Jason's fiancée, Geri Hudson (Joanna Taylor) realised that Jason was cheating on her with Alyson. Her suspicions were confirmed when she saw Jason and Alyson in bed together. Alyson discovered that Beth Morgan (Kate Baines) had been raped by her ex-boyfriend Scott Anderson (Daniel Hyde) during Jason's party, and tried to help her get justice - even giving evidence against Scott during his trial in 2002. Despite their best efforts, Scott was found not guilty. Alyson was also romantically involved with Tony Hutchinson (Nick Pickard).

== Other characters ==
Character	Date(s)	Actor	Circumstances
Reverend Green	2001	Bernard Holley	The father of Anna Green and a vicar. He had an affair which became front-page news.
Suki	11 July	Kim Shuttler	Suki is a model who joins a fashion show ran by Mandy Richardson. Suki finds Tom Cunningham after he goes missing and returns him to his brother, Max Cunningham. Suki has sex with Max in a cellar and she kicks a fuse box which cuts the power to the fashion show. Suki and Max quickly flee from the event.
Gary Nesbitt	October 2001–2002	Guy Leith	The ex-boyfriend of Ellie Hunter. In 1999, when Ellie ran away from her family in Ibiza, Ellie moved in with Gary. The pair eventually moved to Hollyoaks to see Ellie's family.
