= Scott Anderson (Hollyoaks) =

UK soap opera character, created 2001

- Hollyoaks character
- Portrayed by: Daniel Hyde
- Duration: 2001–2005
- First appearance: 17 November 2001
- Last appearance: 11 February 2005
- Introduced by: Jo Hallows
- Spin-off appearances: Hollyoaks: Indecent Behaviour (2001)

Scott Anderson is a fictional character from the British soap opera Hollyoaks, played by Daniel Hyde. The character debuted during the main series spin-off titled Hollyoaks: Indecent Behaviour, which was released on home media on 17 November 2001. He made his main show debut during the episode broadcast on 4 December 2001. Scott initially appeared on a recurring basis but Hyde was promoted to the regular cast and Scott's storylines were expanded when he buys The Loft night club. Scott is characterised as a "bad boy" type who is "ambitious and possessive" but knows how to use his charm.

Writers used Scott to generate controversy within the show. The character's initial storylines revolved around a rape accusation made against him by Beth Morgan (Kate Baines). Scott is portrayed as Beth's antagonist as he taunts her about the events of the rape. Scott begins a relationship with Steph Dean (Carley Stenson) to further discredit Beth's accusation. Beth becomes determined to seek revenge and starts a hate campaign against him. Beth later runs Scott over with her car and she is put on trial for attempted murder and sent to prison. Hyde found the story challenging because of the negative reaction he received from viewers in public. Writers created a potential romance storyline between Scott and Izzy Cornwell (Elize du Toit). Scott begins a rivalry with Ben Davies (Marcus Patric) as they vie for Izzy's affections. Izzy later chooses Ben and marries him, but the story was revisited when their marriage ends following Scott and Izzy having an affair.

Other stories include a power-play with his employee, Ellie Hunter (Sarah Baxendale), committing fraud via a counterfeit money operation and forcing Matt Musgrove (Kristian Ealey) to take the blame. He later begins a feud with his employee, Darren Osborne (Ashley Taylor Dawson), who frames Scott for credit card fraud. Hyde decided to leave the series in 2004. His departure storyline occurred following a fire at The Loft started by Scott, trapping himself and Darren inside. Scott disappears following the fire but continues to threaten Darren whilst off-screen. Hyde returned for two episodes in 2005 to conclude the storyline. Hyde made his final appearance as Scott during the episode broadcast on 11 February 2005. Critics responded to Scott by labelling him the show's "bad boy" character. Hyde has twice been nominated for the "Best Villain" accolade at the British Soap Awards and an Inside Soap Award nomination for "Best Bad Boy".

== Development ==
=== Introduction and characterisation ===
The role of Scott is Hyde's first prominent television acting role. Scott makes his first appearance in Hollyoaks: Indecent Behaviour, which is a spin-off episode filmed for VHS video and DVD release on 17 November 2001. Scott's role in the show is a friend of Jason Cunliffe (Alex Reid), the partner of Geri Hudson (Joanna Taylor). He made his first main series appearance during the episode broadcast on 4 December 2001. Hyde continued to make guest appearances in the show on a recurring basis. He was later promoted to the show's regular cast and Scott's storylines were expanded when he buys The Loft night club.

A writer from the official Hollyoaks website described Scott as "ambitious and possessive, Scott has a mean streak that can quickly offend - but when needs be he can easily turn on the charm." Another described Scott as the show's "number one bad boy and resident love-rat". They added "whenever there's the chance for stirring up a bit of controversy in Hollyoaks Village, it's a safe bet that Scott won't be far from the centre of the action."

=== Rape accusation ===
The character was introduced in Hollyoaks: Indecent Behaviour, which was released on DVD. Scott is a footballer and is then accused of raping Beth Morgan (Kate Baines). The episode synopsis was vague, detailed that Scott and Beth "are drawn into the revelries" at a "wild, all-night party". It was conceived as a special stand alone feature-length episode, which runs parallel to the main show's storylines. In a press release, it was detailed that the episode also "reveals the events that will have momentous repercussions for the Hollyoaks characters momentum."

Scott is found innocent on all counts of raping Beth at his trial. Scott then takes pleasure in gloating about the verdict, which angers Beth. She vows to take revenge against Scott. Baines told Francesca Babb from All About Soap that her character "was absolutely devastated" that the jury did not believe her. She revealed that Beth "cannot handle the fact someone has got away with raping her." Baines believed that Scott being a footballer and celebrity makes the situation worse. In addition Scott "enjoys rubbing her face in the fact he's escaped conviction." Beth becomes fixated on finding someone who will believe her. She wants to prove to Scott that she can still get a man despite being raped. She has casual sex with O.B. (Darren Jeffries) but feels worse after. Scott then sells his story to the magazine "Hey Today!", which Beth finds in the local shop Drive n Buy. Beth is shocked by Scott's actions and purchases every copy to prevent it circulating the village. Beth decides to show up to Scott's football training session to confront and embarrass him. Baines added that "once again he manages to get one over on her. No matter what she does he always comes off as the innocent party and everyone still believes him over her." Baines revealed that Beth gets so angry the police arrive to arrest her. The incident makes Beth more determined to get revenge against Scott. The story progresses with Beth containing to follow Scott to promotional events, including a book launch. Baines noted that her behaviour "is actually starting to scare Scott now". Scott starts to feel "stalked" and is "freaked out" when Beth whispers in his ear that he will never escape the fact he raped her.

Baines told Alison James from Soaplife that Beth feels "short-changed by the justice system". She explained that Beth is believes Scott's status as a "so-called celebrity footballer" helped him get away with raping her. If Scott had been an "average guy" he would have been found guilty. This further pushes Beth's need for revenge. Beth decides to break into Scott's home and vandalises his belongings. Beth is arrested for her crime and other characters begin to turn against her. Baines revealed that they too believe Scott's innocence and think Beth is "obsessed" and "hounding him". Baines concluded that after Beth's behaviour, she would have a "very rough ride" as Scott "shows just how dangerous he can be."

Hyde told Kaz Gillett from BBC Online that Scott's rapist story had a negative impact on his public life. He recalled an incident in which a viewer shouted "rapist!" at him while out in public. He also learned to ignore crude comments from some female viewers about rape.

Scott later flirts with Steph Dean (Carley Stenson), who is sixteen years old. Steph is also friends with Beth's younger sister, Zara Morgan (Kelly Greenwood). Baines explained that Beth worries Steph is "naïve" and will be "totally taken in by Scott". Beth tries to warn Steph but she just thinks Beth is a "nutter". She becomes more determined to get revenge when she learns Scott and Steph are developing a relationship. Baines concluded that "she's going to push things as far as she can so that he will never ever forget what he did to her!"

=== Attempted murder trial ===
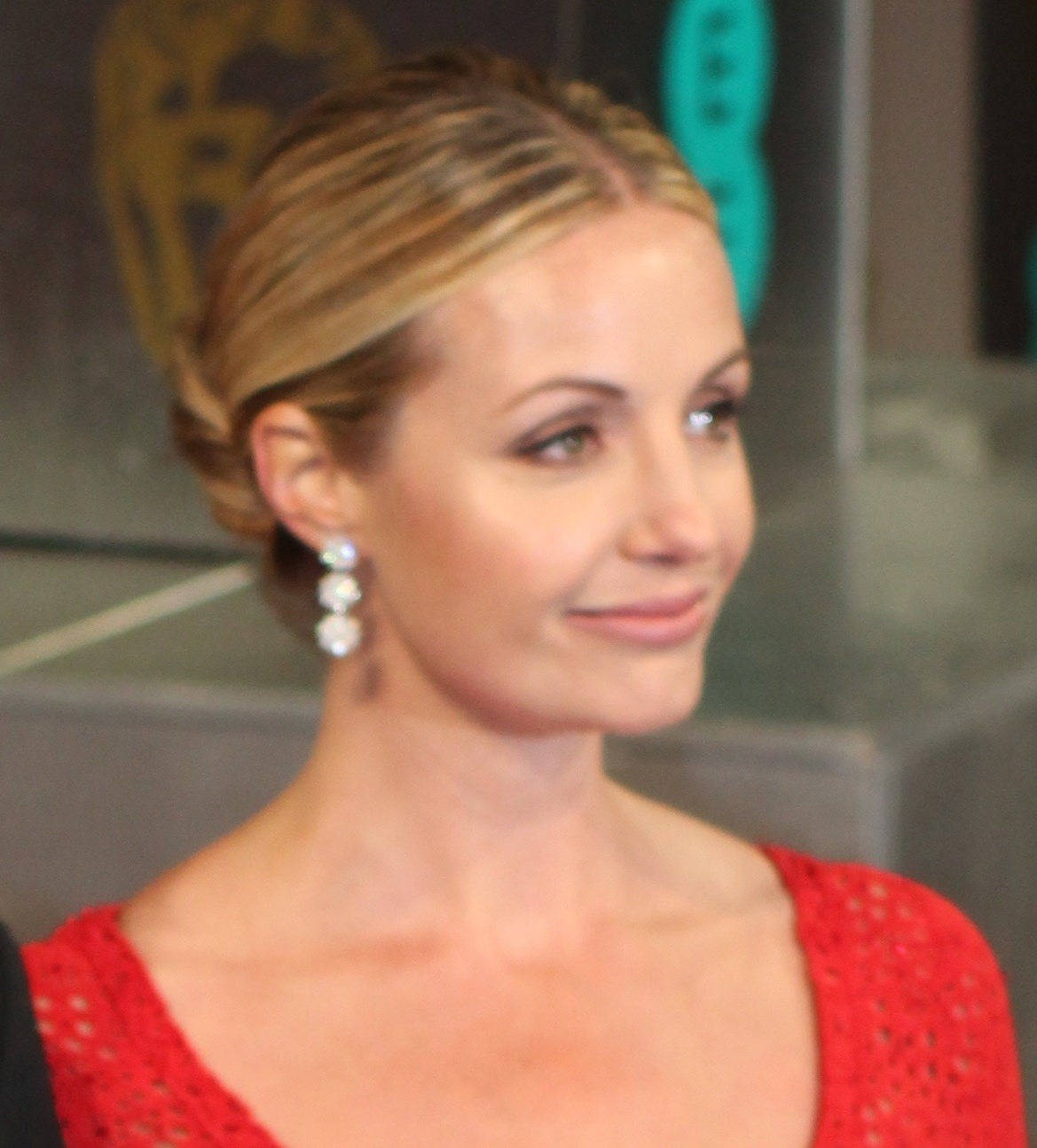
Elize du Toit (pictured) plays Izzy Cornwell, who testifies against Scott in court but later becomes his potential love interest.

Writers continued to victimise Beth by making her the criminal when she runs Scott over with her car. Beth is arrested and the authorities put her on trial for attempted murder. In the episodes leading to the trial, Beth's mental health deteriorates and she becomes obsessed with death. She dreads the trial to the extent she contemplates committing suicide. Interviewed by Karen Dunn (All About Soap), Baines revealed that Beth "is convinced" that she will be found guilty "which means Scott will have won." Baines revealed that Beth later changes her mind, still wanting to expose Scott as a rapist. She added "the only thing keeping her going is the chance that the world may see Scott for what he really is. If this means her going to prison, then that's what she's prepared to do."

Beth is later put on trial and Scott arrives at court feeling confident. The Morgan family support Beth and pay for a good barrister to defend her. In the build up to the trial, Beth tells her barrister that she meant to harm Scott. Despite her admission and she pleads not guilty. She sacks her barrister and hires a new one, played by Sylvester McCoy. Baines told an Inside Soap reporter that her new barrister is disorganised and a comedy part. She explained that Beth's admission is her "just being completely honest. I think she would have reversed back over him if she'd had the chance!"

At the trial, Beth's friend Izzy Cornwell (Elize du Toit) gives evidence and this supports Beth's version of events. Scott's barrister uses Izzy's comments to make Beth appear guilty and the trial begins falling in Scott's favour. Baines concluded that she felt the story between Scott and Beth was too prolonged and wished it had have concluded six months earlier. She added that whilst rape is a serious issue, writers made a "miserable" story last too long. Beth is found guilty and sent to prison. Beth's mental health deteriorates and she later tells her family that she wishes she had murdered Scott. After Beth is released from prison she decides to leave Hollyoaks and move to France. A writer from the Hollyoaks website warned that Beth had been plotting revenge against Scott. When Beth's brother, Luke Morgan (Gary Lucy) returns, Scott is ready for another confrontation with the Morgan family.

=== The Loft and fraud crimes ===
Scott buys the local nightclub called The Loft and makes his presence as the owner known. This causes outrage in the village who begin a hate campaign to force Scott to leave. Scott takes over the nightclub after it faced closure and staff member Ellie Hunter (Sarah Baxendale) is relieved to keep her job. Baxendale told Sarah Ellis from Inside Soap that Ellie is shocked that Scott is the new owner, but is thankful to keep her job. Ellie "tries to keep things sweet" with Scott so they can work together. Other residents continue to harass Scott and graffiti the word "rapist" over a wall. Scott considers selling The Loft but Ellie concocts a scheme to change his mind. Baxendale explained that Ellie flirts with Scott to convince him to stay. Ellie's behaviour concerns her friend, Izzy and she worries that "bad things will happen" to Ellie. Her ex-boyfriend, Toby Mills (Henry Luxemburg) also gets involved in her welfare. Baxendale believed that Ellie knows her friends are correct to worry about her involvement with Scott but is unwilling to admit it. Ellie knows "Scott's not the nicest person in the world" and is aware not to take her scheming too far. She revealed that as the story progresses writer create a "power struggle" between Scott and Ellie, and she begins to endanger her safety.

Writers developed more criminal activity stories for Scott and used his employee, Matt Musgrove (Kristian Ealey) to help circulate counterfeit money around the village and Matt even uses fake bank notes to fraudulently purchase a wedding cake from Tony Hutchinson (Nick Pickard). Matt's girlfriend Chloe Bruce (Mikyla Dodd) is unhappy that Matt is working for Scott but he manages to fool her. Dodd told Inside Soap's Sarah Ellis that Chloe was initially "a bit dubious" about Matt working for Scott. She noted that Scott begins be nice towards Chloe and she begins to think "he's not so evil after all" and believes "everyone deserves a second chance", unbeknownst what he is forcing Matt to commit fraud. When Matt tries to cut ties with Scott, he arranges for Matt to be physically attacked. Dodd reasoned that Matt involvement with Scott came from his desire to financially provide for Chloe. She told Tebbutt that Matt tries to confess but "he's scared" that honesty will end their relationship. Chloe is worried to find Matt with bruised eyes but he pretends he has been mugged at random. Dodd added that Chloe has "no reason to question his story."

Matt is later arrested on his wedding day when the police begin to investigate the rise in fraud. Scott pays for Matt's bail but informs him that in exchange, Matt must take sole responsibility for the fraud and conceal his own involvement in the crimes. Matt is initially unwilling to help Scott, who retaliates by blackmailing him, threatening to inform the police about Matt's involvement in a series of warehouse fires. Matt feels he has no option but to take the blame and go to prison. Ealey told an Inside Soap that Scott promises to give Matt a job and pay for his accommodation upon his release from prison. Ealey added "Scott has Matt by the short and curlies, the only option for him is to go to prison."

=== Izzy Cornwell ===
Writers created a storyline in which Scott falls in love with Izzy Cornwell. It was developed into a love rivalry as Ben Davies (Marcus Patric) also vies to win Izzy's affections. When Izzy decides to go travelling, the pair compete to convince Izzy to stay in Hollyoaks with them. Patric told Inside Soap's Andy Baker that Ben only decides to tell Izzy he loves her when he realises he might lose her. But he also has to contend with Scott's growing interest in Izzy. Patric explained that "Ben finds himself having to compete with Scott for Izzy. It's his worst nightmare really, because for all his faults, Scott has always been a winner with the ladies." Patric revealed that "Scott has somehow managed to convince Izzy he isn't quite the sleazebag everyone thinks he is." Patric described the episode in which Scott and Ben chase Izzy down to the airport as "a very exciting episode". Izzy later marries Ben, but their marriage is problematic and she responds by having sex with Scott. Writers brought an end to their marriage with the reveal of Scott and Izzy's affair. An Inside Soap reporter revealed that Ben and Scott's "brawling" over Izzy could lead to her departure from the show.

=== Departure and return ===
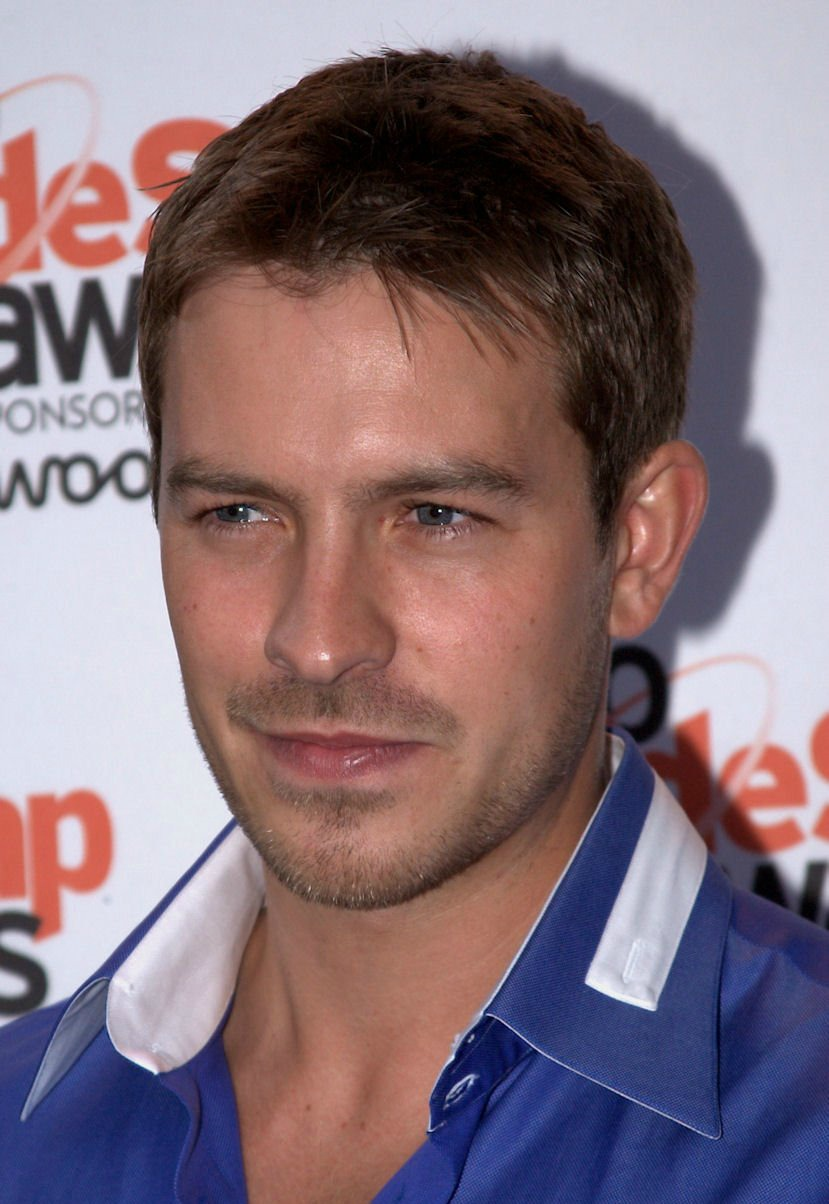
Ashley Taylor Dawson (pictured) plays Scott's enemy, Darren Osborne, who plays a role in Scott's departure storyline.

In February 2004, Hyde announced that he would be leaving the show in April of that year so he could pursue other acting roles. His final scenes were to be filmed in March. Of his decision to quit, Hyde explained to Lee-Ann Fullerton of Daily Record that "I have enjoyed my time in Hollyoaks. The storylines have been great. It has been fun but it has also been tough. When you are getting really good storylines, such as the original rape story and the stuff with Izzy, you get such good things written for you. Then you have to go in and do the normal stuff too." He felt that two and a half years was "a good stretch" and that he was lucky to have been given further plots after the DVD appearance. In May 2004, Scott was featured in a story in which Natalie Osborne (Tiffany Mulheron) attempts to seduce him. Natalie celebrates her eighteenth birthday and has her party at the Loft. She flirts with Scott but is shocked when he responds to her advances and changes her mind about proceeding with sex.

In the build up to his departure in June 2004, Darren Osborne (Ashley Taylor Dawson) frames Scott for credit card fraud. Darren is an employee at The Loft and becomes disgruntled with Scott, who mistreats him in the work place. Darren had been scamming his father, Jack Osborne (Jimmy McKenna) by using his credit card to purchase items over the internet. The police visit Jack to inform him that he is the victim of credit card fraud. Jack asks Darren to go on holiday with him, which Darren agrees to escape the police investigation. Darren asks Scott for time off work, but he sense Darren has an ulterior motive for leaving and refuses to give him time off. Scott later apologises to Darren but he decides to gain revenge on his boss. Taylor Dawson told Inside Soap's Ellis that "Scott's a bit of a loner, he hasn't got any mates, so he takes things out on Darren because he's next in the pecking order." He added that Scott treats Darren "really badly" and makes him "feel small", which causes Darren to be driven by revenge. Darren makes an anonymous call to the police implicating Scott in the credit card fraud. Taylor Dawson explained "Scott's been quite nasty to him so it's like killing two birds with one stone. He thinks he's in the clear, but he's still quite scared." The actor revealed Darren does feel guilty for setting Scott up. Another altercation with Scott reaffirms Darren's motivations for framing him. Taylor Dawson concluded that "it reminds him why he did it, and convinces him that he's done the right thing."

As the story progresses, the Police continue to investigate Scott and raid The Loft. Taylor Dawson revealed that Darren is partly "excited because he thinks Scott may get his comeuppance" but is "worried" about them finding evidence he committed the crimes. He added that Scott knows his innocence and is confident the police will not find anything. This causes Darren to "get the shakes" and Scott decides to close The Loft down and figure out who his enemies are. Darren tries to manipulate Scott into reopening, Taylor Dawson added that Darren is confused by Scott's behaviour because he thinks the closure makes him appear guilty. Darren then tries to come up with new business ideas to get the Loft reopened, but he refuses. The actor assessed "in a weird way Scott was probably" Darren's "closest friend but now he has no one left to turn to."

Scott soon realises Darren has set him up and confronts him. Darren decides to confess but is left "stunned" by Scott's reaction. Taylor Dawson told Ellis that "Scott basically starts throwing all these hints at Darren, breaking him down, and that's when things begin to get out of hand." Scott then sets fire to the loft with him and Darren trapped inside. He then starts a physical fight with Darren, whose actor concluded that "let's just say there is a huge clash, and Darren feels the heat." Scott departed during the episode broadcast on 10 June 2004. In the aftermath of the fire, Scott disappears and instructs his lawyer Tim Scully (Lochlann O'Mearáin) to tie up his affairs. Taylor Dawson revealed that Darren begins to worry Scott will want revenge. He goes to Scott's house but cannot find him. Darren later receives a threatening postcard from Scott and he hires henchmen to attack Darren. Taylor Dawson concluded that despite Scott's departure, the threat he may return looms over Darren.

Hyde reprised the role for two episodes in 2005. He returned in the 10 February episode and made his final appearance during the episode broadcast on 11 February 2005.

== Reception ==
For his portrayal of Scott, Hyde was nominated for the "Villain of the Year" accolade at the 2002, 2004 and 2005 British Soap Awards. He was nominated for "Best Bad Boy" at the 2004 Inside Soap Awards. Hyde/Scott were voted as the seventh biggest hunk in British soap, as decided via a What's on TV reader poll. Reporters from Daily Mirror, Daily Post, Liverpool Echo and Wales on Sunday branded Scott a "bad boy" type character. A Wales on Sunday reporter opined that Hyde was "well-known" for playing one of soap's "TV bad lads". Another Daily Post writer described him as the "hunk Scott Anderson". Steven Ventura from Daily Record labelled Hyde as a "Hollyoaks hunk" and Scott a "nasty" character. Sarah Ellis (Inside Soap) branded Scott the show's "resident bad boy" and a Soaplife writer labelled him a "bad-boy" type character.

Kaz Gillett writing for BBC Online assessed that the "Hollyoaks footballing-rapist" was "known as a bit of a bad boy", adding it was a "quite controversial" role. The Daily Record's Fullerton summed up his storylines: "he has bedded a 16-year-old, tried to seduce his rape accuser's best mate and been a suspected serial killer not bad for two year's work." A writer from Inside Soap criticised how quickly court cases feature in storylines compared to the reality of a long wait. They criticised Scott and Beth's rape storyline, stating "Beth Morgan had barely reported rapist Scott Anderson and she was in the dock stating her case." Karen Dunn from Soaplife included Scott's lies about Beth during his TV appearance in the magazine's "hot plots" feature. Johnathon Hughes from All About Soap assessed that Scott was "as cocky as ever" during Beth's trial.
