= Natalie Osborne =

UK soap opera character, created 2003

- Hollyoaks character
- Portrayed by: Tiffany Mulheron
- Duration: 2003–2004
- First appearance: 23 May 2003
- Last appearance: 24 August 2004
- Introduced by: Jo Hallows
In-universe information
- Occupation: Barmaid
- Family: Osborne
- Father: Kenneth Osborne
- Mother: Amanda Osborne
- Sisters: Rachel Osborne
- Uncles: Jack Osborne; Billy Brodie
- First cousins: Darren Osborne; Ruth Osborne; Bethany Cunningham; Eva Falco

Natalie Osborne is a fictional character from the British soap opera Hollyoaks, played by Tiffany Mulheron. The character made her first on-screen appearance on 23 May 2003. Mulheron made her final appearance as Natalie during the episode broadcast on 24 August 2004.

== Casting ==
Mulheron originally auditioned for the role of Roxy, a guest character, who was later murdered by serial killer Toby Mills (Henry Luxemburg). Mulheron commented, "I don't think I was suitable, which was lucky for me. It was a good part but she didn't live for very long." The character of Natalie and Mulheron's casting were announced in May 2004. Tina Baker from revealed that Natalie was being introduced as the niece of established character Jack Osborne (Jimmy McKenna). She added "looks like the lads are in for a treat" once Natalie arrives.

== Development ==
Natalie had several love interests during her time in the show, and Mulheron thought her character was "quite tarty". Natalie often wore revealing clothing, which she used to "show off her body to snare men." Mulheron said viewers would be surprised to meet her in real life, as she was always covered up. She also said that she and Natalie were very dissimilar. Mulheron called Natalie "a very bad girl" and explained that she loved playing her, as she was "a bitch." She added that before Natalie's scenes, she would stop and think of all the "bitchy things" she could. In May 2004, writers introduced a story in which Natalie tries to seduce local "bad boy" Scott Anderson (Daniel Hyde). Natalie celebrates her eighteenth birthday and has her party at the Loft. She flirts with Scott but is shocked when he responds to her advances and changes her mind about proceeding with sex.

Natalie decides she wants a romantic relationship with her cousin, Darren Osborne (Ashley Taylor Dawson). She makes this decision when Darren gets back together with his ex-girlfriend Debbie Dean (Jodi Albert). Albert told an Inside Soap reporter that Debbie believed she had ruined her chances of reconciling with Darren after she got back with her ex-boyfriend Dan Hunter (Andy McNair). Darren initially refuses but later agrees to give Debbie another chance. This annoys Natalie who decides to scheme against the couple and end their relationship. Albert explained that Debbie is unaware "Natalie has her eye on Darren too" but Natalie makes it known and is "all over him like a rash, trying to make Debbie jealous." Debbie soon tires of Natalie's scheming and a fight ensues between them. Albert revealed that Debbie is "furious" and "sees red" with Natalie when she realises her plan. They have a food fight with tomato ketchup, which Albert branded a "full-scale ketchup fight". Albert added that she and Mulheron had "great fun" filming the fight scenes.

Mulheron decided to leave at the end of her contract in October 2004, so she could pursue different film and television roles.

== Storylines ==
Natalie is Jack's niece who comes to live with him after refusing to return to her small home village. She annoys Jack's lodger Izzy Davies (Elize du Toit) by stealing her clothes and make-up, and flirting with her boyfriend Ben Davies (Marcus Patric). She does not get much work done along with her cousin Darren.

She has a sexual relationship with Darren, but rejects his later advances, until he dates Debbie. Natalie and Darren begin an affair. Debbie's jealousy results in a food fight using tomato ketchup and Darren breaks-up their fight. Natalie later seduces Craig Dean (Guy Burnet) and he loses his virginity to her. She mistreats Craig and his sisters Debbie and Steph Dean (Carley Stenson) get revenge on her. Natalie's younger sister Rachel Osborne (Lucy Evans) arrives and she vows to get rid of Rachel. The sisters begin arguing on numerous occasions and she fails her exams. Natalie becomes pregnant but is unsure who the father is. Jack retaliates by sending Natalie and Rachel back to live in Scotland.

== Reception ==
At the 2004 British Soap Awards, Mulheron was nominated in the category of Sexiest Female for her portrayal of Natalie. A writer from Virgin Media profiled some of Hollyoaks' "hottest females" in their opinion, of Natalie they stated: "The claws were out when Jack Osborne's niece, Natalie, landed in Hollyoaks. The sexy madam charmed the pants off many a man during her brief stay but she was unceremoniously sent back to Scotland after getting pregnant." James Hastings of the Daily Mirror branded the character a "man-eater" and a "spoilt temptress". Lucy Lather from Inside Soap branded Natalie an "irritating" character. When Gordon Cunningham (Bernard Latham) and Helen Cunningham (Kathryn George) were killed off in a car crash storyline, Lather wished that the show's producers had also killed off Natalie "while they were at it". A Soaplife reporter branded Natalie a "femme fatale" type of character and assessed that "Natalie's a girl who knows just what she wants - and usually just how to get it."
