= Matt Musgrove =

Fictional character from Brookside and Hollyoaks

- Brookside and Hollyoaks character
- Portrayed by: Kristian Ealey
- Duration: 1998–2004
- First appearance: 11 November 1998 (Brookside); 16 February 2000 (Hollyoaks)
- Last appearance: 5 January 2000 (Brookside); 12 August 2004 (Hollyoaks)
- Introduced by: Sue Sutton Mayo (1998); Jo Hallows (2000)
- Spin-off appearances: Hollyoaks: Indecent Behaviour (2001); Hollyoaks: After Hours (2004)
In-universe information
- Occupation: Janitor; Sailor
- Father: Joey Musgrove
- Mother: Niamh Musgrove
- Brothers: Luke Musgrove; Ryan Musgrove
- Sisters: Kelly Musgrove
- Grandfathers: Alec O'Brien
- Grandmothers: Helen O'Brien
- Uncles: Sean O'Brien; Paul O'Brien
- Aunts: Rose Gannon
- Nieces: Lia

Matt Musgrove is a fictional character from the British soap operas Brookside and Hollyoaks, played by Kristian Ealey. The character debuted on-screen in Brookside, during the episode broadcast on 11 November 1998. Ealey was cast into the Musgrove family during a series of fast-paced auditions. The Musgroves are an Irish family that consist of several characters and move into Brookside Close. Matt is characterised as a crafty and money-orientated, but is often shown as a kind-hearted character. Matt's initial storylines feature him sharing scenes with the show's teenage characters. Writers created a comedy partnership between Matt and Bosko (Matthew Citrine) and together they create a series of money making scams. Citrine originally auditioned to play Matt and impressed producers, so they created the role of Bosko especially for him. In 1999, the Brookside's new producer Paul Marquess decided to write out the entire Murgrove family and change their storylines dramatically. Ealey was hired by Hollyoaks, which was produced by Mersey Television who also produced Brookside. This allowed Matt's character to transition into an entirely different soap opera, which was considered a first for the soap genre in the United Kingdom.

Matt left Brookside during the episode broadcast on 5 January 2000 and made his Hollyoaks debut on 16 February 2000. Matt secures employment at the Hollyoaks Community College working as a janitor. Writers developed a relationship between Matt and Chloe Bruce (Mikyla Dodd). They have a problematic romance and a wedding storyline was created for them. Writers explored Matt's involvement with local gangster, Scott Anderson (Daniel Hyde), who bullies Matt into his counterfeit money fraud. Matt is arrested on their wedding day and they do not marry. Dodd has stated that the Matt and Chloe's story ended "tragically" but believed they still loved each other. Ealey made his finale appearance as Matt during the Hollyoaks episode broadcast on 12 August 2004.

== Casting ==
The audition process for the Musgrove family was fast-paced. Auditions and call-backs were still being held one week prior to successful candidates filming their first scenes. The character details were announced on 3 November 1998. Ealey was jobless and claiming benefits when he auditioned for the role, and recalled that he originally auditioned "for a laugh really". Matthew Citrine, who played the character Bosko also auditioned to play Matt. Producers decided that Ealey was better suited to the role but liked Citrine's performance and created the character of Bosko for him to play. They later introduced Bosko into the series as Matt's best friend. Ealey was in his early twenties when he joined the cast, but writers aged Matt around seventeen. Ealey made his first appearance as Matt during the Brookside episode broadcast on 11 November 1998.

== Development ==
=== Introduction and characterisation ===
Matt was introduced as of the Musgrove family, an entirely new set of characters created to appear in Brookside. The Musgroves are an Irish family. They consisted of Matt, his grandfather Alec O'Brien (Al Kossy), father Joey Musgrove (Dan Mullane), mother Niamh Musgrove (Barbara Drennan), sister Kelly Musgrove (Natalie Earl) and his two brothers Luke Musgrove (Jason Kavanagh) and Ryan Musgrove (Samuel Hudson). The family were introduced during a special bloc of episodes which aired daily from 9–13 November 1998. The Musgroves move into number eight Brookside Close. Matt arrives during the week's third episode. A writer from the official Brookside website revealed that Matt arrives with "attitude in tow" and "there is instant animosity" with Mike Dixon (Paul Byatt) when Matt tries to charm his girlfriend Rachel Jordache (Tiffany Chapman). They added that Matt's sibling Luke issues "a brotherly warning for Matt not to upset the locals."

The Musgroves were created to help rejuvenate the show. Brookside creator, Phil Redmond told Daily Mirror's Jackie Burden that the four teenagers would "add much-needed youth" to the show. He intended to use the family to bring Brookside "back down to earth" with a "back to basics" approach to storylines. Redmond explained that the Musgroves provided "a lot of generations, a lot of storylines and issues."

A writer from the official Hollyoaks website described Matt as "crafty, money-orientated yet ultimately kind-hearted." Hollyoaks writers portrayed Matt's occupation as caretaker at the Hollyoaks Community College. Ealey told Wendy Granditer from All About Soap that he could not relate to Matt's carefree persona because he worried about life more than his character does. He added that Matt has "a permanently sunny disposition and just takes everything in his stride." Ealey enjoyed playing a teenager because it allowed him to bring his own experiences to the role. He stated that "I've based a lot of him on how I was as a teenager. He's great to play because he's just like me - an easy-going scruff who's a bit of a scally."

=== Early stories ===
Matt was featured in a special location based episode which featured Brookside's younger male characters. The plot features Matt and the characters of Tim O'Leary (Philip Olivier), Jerome Johnson (Leon Lopez), Leo Johnson (Steven Cole) and Bosko. Together the quintet decide to travel to Stonehenge to sell runestones known as the "Stones of Shad", but it transpires the rocks are actually aggregate. The show's assistant producer, Alison Davey told a reporter from Wells Journal that Jerome tires of idea of committing the scam at Stonehenge and decides that they should sell them at the Glastonbury Festival instead. Davey added that the five men arrive in the Somerset town of Pilton near Glastonbury, where the festival is held. They arrive hungry and in search of food. The scenes, which were filmed in Pilton featured the cast in various local cafes and locations. Students from Strode College were used as extras in the episode, which also included two as potential love interests for the characters. The cast and crew stayed overnight in Wells Market Place to accommodate the location shoot.

Writers created a comedic partnership between Matt and Bosko, the duo were featured in comedy stories in which they create money making scams. Their friendship became popular with viewers and both actors built a good rapport to make the friendship authentic. Ealey told Granditer (All About Soap) that he and Citrine "hit it off straightaway". Citrine added that working with Ealey was "all wisecracks and laughs". He recalled his first scene was with Ealey, in which their characters get thrown into a swimming pool. Citrine described it as one of his favourite stories involving the comedy duo. He added that dressing up as druids at Glastonbury was another "highlight". Citrine's family used to tell them that their on-screen partnership reminded them of a 1990s version of Laurel and Hardy.

=== Transition into Hollyoaks ===
On 3 September 1999, it was announced that the entire Musgrove family were being written out of Brookside. The show's new producer Paul Marquess decided to "axe" the characters and change their storylines dramatically. The Musgroves had been portrayed as troubled and crisis ridden. Matt's brother, Luke had been accused of raping Nikki Shadwick (Suzanne Collins) but was found innocent at trial. Writers changed the plot with Luke eventually confessing his guilt. The story annoyed the cast members involved in the storyline and they were confused by the decision to write their characters out. Marquess told Donna Carton from Daily Mirror that in their final story, "the family will find themselves facing their own worst nightmare."

It was later revealed that their final scenes would air in January 2000. Producers allowed Matt to be transferred into another British soap opera, Hollyoaks. It was the first instance of a fictional character being transferred from one British soap to another. He was also the first actor to play the same character in two soaps. An Inside Soap reporter revealed that Ealey had already filmed his first scenes at Hollyoaks and would debut in February 2000. They added that Matt would become a "handyman" at the local college. A Hollyoaks publicist told the reporter that "Chester's just a stone's throw away from Liverpool, so it makes perfect sense for Matt Musgrove to make a move like this. Viewers will get to see another side of Matt in Hollyoaks, and Kristian is delighted about the move."

He made his final Brookside appearance during the episode broadcast on 5 January 2000. He made his first appearance in Hollyoaks during the episode broadcast on 16 February 2000. In 2001, Ealey played Matt in the Hollyoaks spin-off series titled, Hollyoaks: Indecent Behaviour.

=== Relationship with Chloe Bruce ===
Writers created a relationship between Matt and the college student, Chloe Bruce (Mikyla Dodd). Their relationship is initially portrayed as problematic because of Matt behaving in a lazy and unreliable manner. Dodd told All About Soap reporter Joanne Tebbutt that Chloe believes she can trust Matt again, despite his past behaviour. She explained that "Chloe was concerned about Matt's lack of drive and ambition. Recently however, he has turned over a new leaf, and Chloe realises she really loves him and trusts him."

Writers planned a temporary break-up for them during Chloe's self-confidence storyline. She becomes insecure and feels unlovable which results in their split. Dodd believed their break-up was due to Chloe's insecurities and she explained to Clare Radford from All About Soap Matt had to leave Chloe "for his own sanity", but they "never stopped loving each other". They continue to spend time together as they try to deal with their friends Alex Bell (Martino Lazzeri), Becca Hayton (Ali Bastian) and Jamie Nash (Stefan Booth) becoming embroiled in a love triangle. Dodd told Radford that Alex, Becca and Jamie's dramas were "just an excuse" for Matt and Chloe to keep spending time together and they acted as each other's "shoulder to cry on". Dodd revealed that Matt and Chloe have a discussion and realise "how they never put themselves first", this prompts Chloe to be bold and ask Matt if he would consider reconciling their relationship. He is keen and takes Chloe out on a date. Dodd summarised that "Matt jumps straight in with both feet, he is sure he wants to be with Chloe." Dodd also hoped that Chloe's self-esteem issues would not impact their relationship again. She concluded that "they have their faults but they accept and love each other completely. Plus they are very caring and compassionate people."

The story continues with Matt proposing marriage to Chloe. Dodd believed the build-up to their wedding would be challenging. During their break-up, Matt has sex with Eve Crawford (Natasha Lund), Dodd explained that Chloe remains unaware of this but predicted that there would be "fireworks" once Chloe discovers their tryst. She added that ultimately Chloe needs to learn to trust Matt. Writers developed their engagement into a wedding storyline. Matt tries to change his behaviour but soon gets involved in criminal activities operated by local gangster, Scott Anderson (Daniel Hyde). Matt helps Scott circulate counterfeit money around the village and even uses fake bank notes to fraudulently purchase a wedding cake from Tony Hutchinson (Nick Pickard).

Dodd told Inside Soap's Sarah Ellis that Chloe was initially "dubious" about Matt working for Scott. He begins to be nice to Chloe and she begins to think "he's not so evil after all" and believes "everyone deserves a second chance", unbeknownst what he is forcing Matt to do. Scott arranges for Matt to be physically attacked when he tries to exit the monetary scheme. Dodd reasoned that Matt involvement with Scott came from his desire to better provide for Chloe financially. She told Tebbutt that Matt tries to confess but "he's scared" that honesty will end their relationship. Chloe is worried to find Matt with bruised eyes but he pretends he has been mugged at random. Dodd added that Chloe has "no reason to question his story." She begins to suspect that Matt is involved in fraud when Tony informs her the wedding cake money is fake. Writers planned Chloe and Matt's wedding to play out over two episodes. In the first, Chloe is approached by police, who arrive to arrest Matt his role in the counterfeit money operation. Chloe convinces the detective to allow them to marry, before they arrest him. Dodd revealed that Chloe is "devastated, and feels very, very betrayed because she really trusted Matt." The second episode features Chloe attending the church, intending to marry Matt. The outcome was kept embargoed from advance storyline spoilers to surprise viewers. Dodd concluded that "Matt says his vows, and Chloe makes her mind up once and for all." Dodd told Ellis that "it was such fun to film because viewers are kept guessing right up until Chloe reaches the altar." Dodd later revealed that the wedding plot was one of her favourite storylines to work on because "it was a dramatic cliffhanger". The pair do not marry and break-up. Of Matt and Chloe's relationship, Dodd later told Matthew Evans, author of Phil Redmond's Hollyoaks: The Official Companion, that the duo "split up so tragically" but "ultimately they love each other".

=== Departure and return ===
Matt is arrested following the wedding and is released on bail. Scott pays for Matt's bail but informs him that it comes with the condition he confesses to fraud and keep Scott out of the investigation. Ealey told an Inside Soap reporter that Matt was behaved naively during the plot, adding "I don't think Matt gave a second thought to being found out." He believed that Matt just wanted to make fast cash to give Chloe a memorable wedding. Matt is initially unwilling to help Scott, who retaliates by blackmailing him, threatening to inform the police about Matt's involvement in a series of warehouse fires. Matt feels he has no option but to take the blame and go to prison. Ealey revealed that Scott promises to give Matt a job and pay for his accommodation upon his release from prison. Ealey added "Scott has Matt by the short and curlies, the only option for him is to go to prison. He's keen to try and make things up to Chloe but it doesn't look like there's much chance of that in the foreseeable future."

Ealey later appeared as Matt in the late night spin-off episodes titled, Hollyoaks: After Hours. Ealey also filmed a return to the main Hollyoaks series to aid Dodd's departure from the show. His return storyline features Matt trying to convince Chloe to get back together. Chloe decides to leave Hollyoaks to take a job at Capital FM in London. Matt wants to move to London with Chloe and resume their relationship. Dodd told Andy Baker from Inside Soap that Matt's return is "sudden" and "he says he still loves her." Dodd explained that Chloe is forced to make "a big decision", noting "he's hurt her so badly before, but ultimately I think they're soulmates." The outcome of the storyline was press embargoed and Dodd refused to reveal if Matt and Chloe reunite prior to her departure. He made his final appearance as Matt during the Hollyoaks episode broadcast on 12 August 2004.

== Reception ==
Of the Musgrove's Brookside introduction, Daily Mirror's Burden stated "three hunky lads and a pretty girl look ready to set Brookside hearts fluttering when a new Irish family moves into the Close." Bairbre Power from The Herald criticised the authenticity of the Musgrove's Irish accents. She was confused because each family member had a different accent and branded it "one of the biggest mysteries of the soaps". Power noted that while Niamh, Joey and Luke had different Irish regional accents, but Matt and Kelly "sound pure Scouse". She added that viewers were "puzzled" by siblings close in age sounding totally different. Kathy Griffiths from the Lincolnshire Echo disliked the Musgrove family and believed the Brookside "we all know and love" changed with their arrival. Griffiths disliked Matt's scheming because it not "remotely realistic". She scathed "just when you think those Musgroves have done enough to make you despise them, they come up with something new. Matt Musgrove's bogus Disciples of Shad druid-style gimmick has to be the worst thing that awful family have done yet - and that really is saying something."

Tebbutt from All About Soap branded Matt the show's "naughty lad" and a "Liverpudlian layabout" character. Their colleague, Wendy Granditer branded Matt and Bosko the show's "resident comedy duo" and "Brookside's favourite double act." Granditer noted the two actors were able to "slip effortlessly back into character" once in front of a camera. She described the actors as "well-matched and "partners in crime". She concluded Matt and Bosko "have had viewers in stitches as the soap's resident scally scam merchants." Eileen Critchley branded Matt one of the "worst-dressed people in soap" and was critical of his scruffy style. She assessed that "the hippie look makes an occasional return, but there is a limit. And under all that hair, it's hard to tell where Matt's barnet ends and where his hooded waterproof begins. Corrie's Spider may be able to carry off the crusty look without looking like he's spent three years campaigning against the Newbury bypass in the same outfit, but Matt just looks a mess."

Tina Miles from Liverpool Echo branded Matt a "cool, happy-go-lucky scouser". Charlotte Whistlecroft from Digital Spy said Ealey was best known for playing "cheeky scouser" Matt. A writer from Greatest Hits Radio believed Ealey "gained notoriety for being the first actor to play the same character in two soaps." Closer's Kayleigh Dray believed the "character was famed for his rocky relationship with radio DJ Chloe Bruce, leaving Hollyoaks permanently when she split with him for good." Writers from What's on TV described Matt as a "happy-go-lucky" type of character.

Of Matt's soap opera crossover, Merle Brown from Daily Record stated "brilliant this business of moving characters from soap to soap, though, isn't it?" She added that Matt is "a dab hand at dealing with family scandal." All About Soap chose the episode Matt proposes to Chloe in their "10 top episodes" feature in their 24 August - 21 September 2002 issue.
