= Chloe Bruce =

- Hollyoaks character
- Portrayed by: Mikyla Dodd
- Duration: 2000–2004
- First appearance: 15 March 2000
- Last appearance: 12 August 2004
- Introduced by: Jo Hallows
- Spin-off appearances: Hollyoaks: Breaking Boundaries (2000)
In-universe information
- Occupation: Radio presenter

Chloe Bruce is a fictional character from the British soap opera Hollyoaks, played by Mikyla Dodd. She made her first on-screen appearance on 15 March 2000. The character is noted for her storylines involving self-image issues and acting as the "agony aunt" within the serial.

== Casting ==
Auditions were held for the part. Actress Mikyla Dodd was member of Oldham Theatre Workshop under the tuition of David Johnson and through that she got an agent, who managed to get her the audition for Chloe. Dodd, then aged twenty-two was unaware that Chloe's character breakdown detailed her as being aged seventeen. Dodd had styled her hair and applied make-up onto her face. She went into a toilet washed the make-up off and changed her hairstyle to appear younger. She recalled "I will be seventeen!"

Dodd then auditioned for casting director Dorothy Andrew and series producer Jo Hallows. Dodd recalled having an "immediate good vibe" from Hallows, but shocked her by revealing her real age. Dodd became determined to get Hallows to over-look her age and humoured her way through the end of her audition. She impressed Hallows, when Dodd returned home from the audition she found out she had secured the role via a message left on her answering machine. Casting directors also chose Dodd because she was over-weight, an alternative character appearance they wanted to included in the series. She revealed "I was cast because of the way I look, not in spite of it." Dodd recalled filming her first scenes as Chloe with Hallows directing. She felt nervous during filming but tried her best. She recalled Hallows approaching her and saying she appeared insecure on-set. Dodd explained her feelings but Hallows reassured her that she would tell Dodd if she was doing a bad job.

== Development ==
Dodd made her first appearance as Chloe in the show's late night spin-off episode titled, Hollyoaks: Breaking Boundaries. Chloe is introduced as a school friend of Max Cunningham (Matt Littler) and Sam "O.B." O'Brien (Darren Jeffries). They wrote numerous money making schemes into her early stories and she also loses her virginity to Max. In the book, Phil Redmond's Hollyoaks: The Official Companion, Dodd told author Matthew Evans that "everybody has had a dodgy sexual experience and everybody said 'I was just cringing' and that was how it was meant to be." She recalled her and Littler being nervous and Hallows asking them to kiss more during filming. Writers gave the character an in-universe nickname of 'Chloe "the moose" Bruce'. Evans described Chloe as "coming into her own" once she befriends other characters. Her role in the show was expanded as she becomes a student at Hollyoaks Community College.

Chloe takes on the role of the show's agony aunt type character. Dodd described her as "a good friend to everybody during their strife". Writers explored an issue based storyline via the character, exploring self-image issues. Dodd revealed that it was one of her favourite storylines and received a "wonderful response" from viewers. Dodd liked the fact her character looked different to everyone else on the show. Dodd has stated that was known as "the fat girl from Hollyoaks" during her time in the role. Dodd became unhappy with her weight during her tenure and dieted to lose weight. She added that "the producers and writers are all very supportive" with her lifestyle choices. Her character has also been described as 'breaking the mould' as the first plus-size character to feature in the series.

Writers created a relationship between Chloe and the college's caretaker, Matt Musgrove (Kristian Ealey). Their relationship develops into a wedding storyline. Their relationship is originally problematic because of Matt being unreliable and lazy. Dodd told Joanne Tebbutt from All About Soap that despite Matt's behaviour, her character believed she could trust him again. She added that Chloe was concerned about Matt's lack of drive and ambition. Recently however, he has turned over a new leaf, and Chloe realises she really loves him and trusts him." He tries to change his ways but eventually gets involved in criminal activities for a local gangster, Scott Anderson (Daniel Hyde). Matt helps Scott circulate counterfeit money around the village and even pays for the wedding cake fraudulently.

Matt gets himself into trouble with Scott, who responds by arranging to have Matt physically attacked. Dodd told Tebbutt that Matt only gets involved with Scott to provide for Chloe financially. She added that Matt tries to confess but "he's scared" that honesty will end their relationship. Chloe begins to suspect that Matt is involved in fraud when Tony Hutchinson (Nick Pickard) informs her the wedding cake money is fake. Writers planned Chloe and Matt's wedding to play out over two episodes. In the first, the police arrive to arrest Matt for his involvement in the counterfeit money operation. Chloe convinces the detective to allow them to marry, before they arrest him. The second episode features Chloe attending the church, intending to marry Matt. The outcome was kept embargoed from advance storyline spoilers to surprise viewers. Dodd concluded that "Matt says his vows, and Chloe makes her mind up once and for all." Dodd later revealed that the wedding plot was one of her favourite storylines to work on. The pair do not marry and break-up. Of Chloe and Matt's relationship, Dodd later told Evans that "ultimately they love each other".

In 2004 it was announced that Dodd had decided to leave Hollyoaks. Speaking of Dodd's departure, a Channel 4 spokesperson stated: "The cast were really sad to see her go, she became very much like her character and was always there for people. Mikyla became a bit of an agony aunt for the rest of the cast."

== Storylines ==
Chloe arrived in Hollyoaks in late night special series Hollyoaks: Breaking Boundaries, as a school friend of Max and O.B., she soon proved her worth when she relieved them both of their virginity. They formed a close threesome, with the boys often enlisting Chloe to help them with money making schemes playing Mother Christmas when they started their own grotto. Chloe came into her own when she started at Hollyoaks Community College and became friends with the other students.

She moved into Tony’s house and after a one-night stand with Alex Bell (Martino Lazzeri), but soon found happiness with assistant caretaker Matt. For a time the relationship looked blissful, yet it went sour when Chloe began to have problems with her weight and self-perception and they split up. Chloe tried to come to terms with her problems and attempting to find the Chloe that she is comfortable being.

However, soon Matt and Chloe got back together after the pair admitted they still loved each other. Matt proposed to Chloe and she agreed to marry him. Chloe had felt that Matt was her man as he was kind, gentle and forgiving, but she did not know was of his dodgy deals with Scott Anderson (Daniel Hyde). During her wedding day, Chloe was shocked when Tony accused her of giving him counterfeit money for the catering. The matter had got even more serious as Matt waited at the altar, Chloe arrived and shocked everyone when she told Matt that she could not go ahead with the wedding after discovering that the money came from him with Scott's dealings. Despite all this, Chloe still loved Matt but decided to move on from Hollyoaks by cashing in on the honeymoon tickets and going travelling with Izzy Cornwell (Elize du Toit).

Two months later, Chloe returned and was a more relaxed person as she helped Max, Becca Hayton (Ali Bastian), Ben Davies (Marcus Patric), Izzy, OB and many other characters of the show to get over their problems. She found herself being Student Union Advisor as she opened a Student bar. However, Chloe got the unexpected a job at Capital Radio, a job meaning she had to move to London. Ex fiancé, Matt returned asking her to get back with him. Chloe had two options and decided that her destiny is to take the job and start a new chapter in her life away from Hollyoaks.

== Reception ==
In 2009, Professor Michael McMahon of Nuffield Health criticised plus-size celebrities for normalising being over-weight. A reporter from BBC News noted Dodd's weight and dress size when she appeared on-screen as Chloe. McMahon's comments made Dodd publicly defend "overweight role models" on television. Tebbutt from All About Soap branded Chloe the "bubbly Bruce lass".
