= Geri Hudson =

- Hollyoaks character
- Portrayed by: Joanna Taylor
- Duration: 1999–2001
- First appearance: 13 September 1999
- Last appearance: 19 December 2001
- Introduced by: Jo Hallows
- Spin-off appearances: Hollyoaks: Indecent Behaviour (2001)
In-universe information
- Occupation: Student
- Mother: Jacqui Hudson
- Brothers: Gary Hudson
- Husband: Jason Cunliffe

Geri Hudson is a fictional character from the British soap opera Hollyoaks, played by Joanna Taylor. The character made her first on-screen appearance on 13 September 1999. Taylor made her final appearance as Geri during the episode broadcast on 19 December 2001.

== Development ==
Taylor made her first on-screen appearance as Geri during the episode broadcast on 13 September 1999. Geri was introduced into Hollyoaks as one of five new students studying at Hollyoaks Community College. They consisted of three female students Geri, Anna Green (Lisa M. Kay), Nikki Sullivan (Wendy Glenn) and two male students Alex Bell (Martino Lazzeri) and Sam Smallwood (Tim Downie). The quintet make their first appearances during the episodes from the week commencing 12 September 1999. Lazzeri recalled that joining the cast was not daunting for the five actors because they were all in the same situation. The group were featured in typical chaotic student storylines during their first months on-screen. A Soaplife reporter revealed that one of Geri's first stories would feature her feeling "the long arm of the law after a spot of naked night-riding." Taylor participated in a Switzerland based location shoot for episodes featuring Geri and the students enjoying a skiing holiday. They also attend the wedding of Nikki and Dan Sanders (Joseph May). Geri later graduates to her second year at Hollyoaks Community College.

In the book Phil Redmond's Hollyoaks: The Official Companion, author Matthew Evans described Geri as "without a doubt one of the most gutsy and larger-than-life characters in the show." He added that Geri is portrayed with "gutsiness and sharp wit". Writers portrayed her as a "keen socialite" and "never one to miss out on a drinking session". Despite being a student at Hollyoaks Community College, Geri was often portrayed as the least "diligent of students" who always preferred the social aspect of college life. Geri likes to be "pampered and idolised", she views herself as a "wannabe IT girl". Geri is often featured in party scenes and the wardrobe department often chose her revealing clothing. Kay told Francesca Babb from All About Soap that "Joanna hates it whenever there is a party, as her character always has to wear next to nothing."

Taylor told Ellie Genower from Soaplife that she believed despite Geri's "quite feisty" persona she is "sensitive when she needs to be". She described Geri as the type who "does what she thinks and doesn't hold back"; but Taylor noted Geri is never nasty about it. Taylor admired Geri's characterisation and stated she would not want to play anyone else in Hollyoaks but Geri. Taylor believed that Geri had been heartbroken by men numerous times during her first year on the show. She told Genower that "it would be really nice if someone could be interested in her for something other than just sex for a change."

Writers developed a friendship between Geri and Anna, eventually becoming best friends and a relationship for Geri that was endured through her entire tenure. They made Geri protective of Anna, especially when Anna's boyfriend Sam has sex with Nikki. Geri and her mother, Jacqui Hudson (Julie Peasgood) help Anna to take revenge against Sam, following his infidelity. Taylor revealed that Geri getting revenge on Sam was one of her favourite storylines that she portrayed. She added the storyline she hated doing the most was Geri waxing her moustache.

Writers made Geri and Nikki enemies, but it was her rivalry with Izzy Cornwell (Elize du Toit) that writers concentrated on mostly. They become enemies following Geri's break-up with Adam Morgan (David Brown). He decides that he wants to be with Izzy instead of Geri. Evans (The Official Companion) noted that Geri developed a "hatred for Izzy" and that was long lasting until Geri left the series. The storyline arc is essentially a "war of words" that "continued for over a year". Evans added that Nikki and Izzy are Geri's "sworn enemies" and that Geri "revelled in her catfights" with them. He added Geri was least likely to say "apology accepted" to any of her enemies.

Adam secretly installs hidden cameras into the student flat as part of his idea to create a film for an assignment. Geri is first to realise what Adam has done and begins to manipulate the situation to her advantage. She gets Izzy to admit her true feelings about the Morgan family, knowing Adam will see the recording. Brown told All About Soap's Babb that Geri makes it her goal to "manipulate the camera as much as possible" and succeeds in "stirring up all sorts of trouble" for Izzy and Adam. Brown added that Adam is "really annoyed" with Geri when he realises her scheming and fails to recognise "the human element behind the film he is making". He also believed that Geri was rightful "to get her own back on Adam" for filming in secret but Adam just thinks Geri has ruined the authenticity of his film project.

Geri later develops an attraction to Dan Hunter (Andy McNair) but her persistence only annoys him. McNair told an All About Soap reporter that "Geri is all over him like a rash". He believed that her behaviour makes Dan disinterested in a romance with her. He concluded that Geri's "timing stinks" and she "tries it on at the most inopportune times", which makes him ignore her in the end.

== Storylines ==
Geri arrived as a fresher at Hollyoaks Community College. Geri was a rich daughter of a biscuit factory owner and academia was never high on her list of priorities. She arrived in Hollyoaks determined to have as much fun as she possibly could. Geri moved into the halls with Sam, Nikki, Anna and Alex, and soon formed a strong friendship with Anna that would last throughout her time in Hollyoaks. Geri hooked up with Rory Finnigan (James Redmond), but was dropped by him when he returned to Carol Groves (Natalie Casey). After much teasing, she finally got together with Adam. However, this relationship was also scuppered when Adam lost interest in her over new fresher Izzy. Spurned by Adam, Geri formed a hatred for Izzy, which continued until just before she left Hollyoaks, when they finally reconciled their differences. A brief dalliance with Lewis Richardson (Ben Hull) followed, but this soon fizzled out and it seemed as if Geri would never meet the man of her dreams.

It was on holiday with her mother, the irrepressible Jacqui, which Geri met and fell for the football ace, Jason Cunliffe (Alex Reid). What followed was a tumultuous relationship, as Geri had to cope with being the trophy and, at times, celebrity girlfriend and then, after Jason finally relented, she became celebrity fiancée. This relationship reached a climax in the video/DVD, 'Hollyoaks: Indecent Behaviour', when Geri saw Jason’s true colours as he was unfaithful to her and then turned a blind eye when his team-mate, Scott Anderson (Daniel Hyde) attempted to force himself on her. Geri was devastated that her fairy tale prince had been exposed to be such a rogue. After much thought, she decided to go through with the wedding anyway and extract as much money as she could out of Jason, this was about revenge, not love. It was this plan that led Geri to leave. She married Jason and then, as they left for a new life in Spain, she threw him out of their limousine, informing him that their marriage was over and that she was going with her mother. As she left for the airport, Geri drove through Hollyoaks Village one last time and bid a tearful farewell.

== Reception ==
For her portrayal of Geri, Taylor received a "Best Soap Actress" nomination at the 2001 TV Quick Awards. She was nominated in the "Best Bitch" category at the 2001 Inside Soap Awards In 2002, Taylor was nominated for the "Best Actress" accolade at the British Soap Awards.

Author Matthew Evans noted that the character gained "massive popularity" and that only Jude Cunningham (Davinia Taylor) rivalled her in popularity. He branded her one of the "most desired and popular" characters ever to feature in Hollyoaks. He noted that female viewers "admired" Geri and male viewers "lusted after" her. He concluded that by the time she left Geri had created "indelible memories" and "millions of viewers were sad to bid farewell to her." A writer from Virgin Media profiled their opinions of some of Hollyoaks' "hottest females". Of Geri, they stated: "Geri Hudson might've been one of the hottest honeys in the village but she still had her fair share of drama in the romance department. After marrying the ultimate bad boy footballer she eventually escaped with his cash to Spain. " Singer Lisa Scott-Lee said that she was just like Geri, a character who is "strong and independent and a bit feisty too". Allison Maund from Inside Soap branded Geri a bed-hopping female. An Inside Soap reporter included Geri at number one in a list of their "top five Hollyoaks blonde" characters. They stated that "maneater extraordinaire - she's our No.1 Chester blonde."

Claire Tolley from the Liverpool Echo described Geri as "Hollyoaks biggest flirt and man-eater [who] spends the majority of her time in the soap getting one over on her love rivals." John Kelly from Wicklow People assessed that "Geri's wedding turns out to be a riotous affair ending up with the bride and her mother leaving for the honeymoon without the groom." Soaplife's Genower wrote that "as a girl with an eye for the men, Hollyoaks' Geri Hudson hasn't always had the best of luck in the romance stakes... She slept with Finn, only for him to dump her for Carol, then she fell for Adam Morgan during his doomed fling with teacher Christine." Her colleague, Karen Dunn profiled Geri and Jason stating "Move over Posh and Becks". Dunn believed that Geri was "clearly head-over-feels in love" with Jason and had "a smile that says it all". Though questioned the sincerity of Jason's feeling, wondering if he was using her as a publicity stunt.
