= Darren Osborne =

Fictional character from Hollyoaks

- Hollyoaks character
- Ashley Taylor Dawson as Darren Osborne
- Portrayed by: Adam Booth (1996–1997); Ashley Taylor Dawson (1999–present)
- Duration: 1996–1997; 1999–2000; 2003–present
- First appearance: 18 November 1996
- Introduced by: Jo Hallows (1996, 1999, 2003)
- Spin-off appearances: Hollyoaks Later (2009, 2020); Hollyoaks: A Little Film About Love (2011)
- Crossover appearances: Brookside (2025)
In-universe information
- Occupation: Barman; Businessman; Cab driver
- Family: Osborne
- Father: Jack Osborne
- Mother: Sandy Roscoe
- Adoptive mother: Celia Osborne
- Stepmother: Frankie Osborne; Darcy Wilde
- Half-brothers: Joe Roscoe; Freddie Roscoe; Ziggy Roscoe; Robbie Roscoe; Jason Roscoe; Tom Cunningham (adoptive)
- Half-sisters: Ruth Osborne; Bethany Cunningham
- Wife: Hannah Ashworth (2009–2011); Nancy Hayton (2012–2014, 2014–2020, 2022–present); Mandy Richardson (2021–2022)
- Sons: JJ Osborne; Oscar Osborne
- Daughters: Frankie Osborne
- Adoptive sons: Charlie Dean; Phoenix Hathaway
- Adoptive daughters: Morgan Osborne
- Stepdaughters: Ella Richardson
- Grandmothers: Aggie Osborne
- Uncles: Billy Brodie; Kenneth Osborne
- Aunts: Auntie Christine; Margie; Jean
- Nephews: JJ Roscoe; Gabriel McQueen; Maddox Keane
- Nieces: Lexi Roscoe
- First cousins: Natalie Osborne Rachel Osborne; Eva Falco

Darren Osborne is a fictional character from the British Channel 4 soap opera Hollyoaks. He was introduced by executive producer Phil Redmond as part of the Osborne family, making his first screen appearance on 18 November 1996, portrayed by Adam Booth. Booth left the role in 1997, and the character was later recast to Ashley Taylor Dawson who first appeared in September 1999. Dawson left the role in 2000 to concentrate on his music career, though returned in 2003 and has remained in the role ever since. He remains one of the longest-running characters in the soap.

Initially characterised as a "bad boy", Darren has become notable for maturing throughout his tenure. One of his most notable storylines included his battle with a gambling addiction, which led him losing his share in The Dog in the Pond public house, resulting in him being disowned by his family. Darren later helped his father, Jack (Jimmy McKenna), to fake his own death as part of a scam, which drew comparisons to the John Darwin disappearance case. Darren has been known for his multiple relationships, including Cindy Cunningham (Stephanie Waring), a "shotgun" marriage to Hannah Ashworth (Emma Rigby), a brief affair with his mother-in-law Suzanne Ashworth (Suzanne Hall), three marriages to Nancy Hayton (Jessica Fox), an affair and subsequent relationship with Sienna Blake (Anna Passey) and his various relationships and brief affair with Mandy Richardson (Sarah Jayne Dunn). Darren is the biological father of JJ (Ryan Mulvey), Frankie (Isabelle Smith), Oscar (Noah Holdsworth), and has also adopted Nancy's nephew Charlie Dean (Charlie Behan) and fostered Phoenix Hathaway (Tylan Grant).He also believed he was the father of Morgan Osborne but later found out that the baby belonged to his friend Tony Hutchinson (Nick Pickard). In 2013, the character was the lead of a storyline where he found out that Sandy Roscoe (Gillian Taylforth) is his biological mother, meaning that he had five half-brothers and is a part of the Roscoe family. Between 2019 and 2020, Darren constructed a friendship with Nancy's new partner Kyle Kelly (Adam Rickitt), in a storyline which saw Kyle support Darren after he became depressed. During Hollyoaks' 30th anniversary episode airing on 22 October 2025 he was one of serveal Hollyoaks characters that appeared in the crossover episode with Brookside.

== Character creation and casting ==
Darren was created by Hollyoaks executive producer Phil Redmond in 1996. He was created along with his father Jack Osborne and step-mother Celia; they arrived from America to join Darren's older sister Ruth, who was already living in the village. He moved back to America and later returned until the current time. Darren has been referred to as "one of the most popular and longest serving Hollyoaks characters".

Auditions were held for the part of Darren with Adam Booth securing the part in 1996; his first appearance was on 18 November. Booth left Hollyoaks in 1997, so the role was recast in 1999 with Ashley Taylor Dawson. Other actors that auditioned while in the stages of recasting included fellow cast member Alex Carter who went on to secure the part of Lee Hunter two years later. While at the National Youth Theatre aged 17 Dawson joined the cast of Hollyoaks. He went on to secure the part of Darren following an audition. Dawson has said that his first day at Hollyoaks was "daunting". Dawson left in 2000 to pursue a pop career in the UK pop band allSTARS*. AllSTARS* split up and Dawson later re-joined Hollyoaks in August 2003 with his return airing onscreen in October.

Dawson has said, regarding playing the role of Darren, "I love playing the bad lad. He's my alter ego". In 2010 speaking of his ten-year tenure on the serial Dawson said he felt he like he was "turning a bit into Ken Barlow" and added that he enjoyed playing Darren more each year. Dawson added that he was "still learning" and did not take his role for granted. He stated, "I’m not ignorant enough to think I can just go off and be a Hollywood star! I’d like to take on some more challenges for Darren".

== Development ==
=== Characterisation ===
"I've loved all the explosions we've done - they're always good fun to film, from the one in the church to The Dog exploding. All of Darren's gambling problems have been fantastic, and getting shot! And now it's this - this storyline with Darren as a father. I'm looking forward to it and the changes that Darren is going to go through".

— Ashley Taylor Dawson regarding the events of Darren's life and how they have changed him (2011).

Darren's personality has developed over the character's duration. At first, according to Dawson, Darren was "very manipulative" and willing to "do anything to get his own way". Dawson added that some of Darren's actions were "blatantly horrible" although he felt that this made Darren "such a fun character to play". Dawson also commented on Darren's "luck with girls"; Dawson felt that Darren "tends to take girls for granted" and is "out for all he can get". Dawson also called Darren "an opportunist" and a "male chauvinist pig".

Darren's earlier appearance including his "customary string vests and bling" (2009).

On the character's transformation Dawson told Digital Spy that when Darren was younger he was "just a horrible child and he had nothing nice to say about anyone" before Darren matured and softened. Dawson added that it was nice to see a different side to the character. Dawson later added that the character's change was good as "everyone goes through changes in their life and Darren just hit that time. It was good timing for him". He also explained that his character becoming a father led him to develop and mature further, stating that Darren accepted his responsibilities as a father and "tries hard to be the father that he wants to be". He felt that Darren enjoyed being a father and that it made him feel "complete and like he has a purpose in life, whereas before he was always chasing his tail". Dawson felt that as time went on, Darren became more helpful, sympathetic and more empathetic towards other characters, especially Jake Dean (Kevin Sacre). Dawson stated, "It's very uncharacteristic but Darren is softening up". Dawson added that Darren's difficult life has led him to mature and act like a "bit of a saint", but that Darren was still greatly misunderstood.

E4's official Website described Darren in this way: "For a long time Darren found it easier making enemies than he did friends, what with his constant scheming and dangerous gambling habit ... Darren 2.0 is a reformed man though". Hollyoaks international broadcaster BBC America described the character as a "relentless schemer and ne'er-do-well". Darren has been described as the "village hunk", an "outcast", a "bad boy", a "twisted hunk", "heartless", "hapless" and "sly" by various media sources.

Dawson stated that when he first auditioned he had "bumfluff" which he was asked to keep for the part. Darren's dress sense has gone undergone changes in recent years. He often wore string vests and gold jewellery but he later changed his style which became more mature. On his character's change in style and the reasons for it Dawson said the producers were right to make the changes and opined that Darren has "moved on now and grown up a bit".

=== Earlier storylines ===
One of Darren's earliest storylines saw him and friend Luke Morgan (Gary Lucy) stand up to bully Mark Gibbs (Colin Parry). Darren becomes friends with Mark in an attempt to deter Mark's bullying but Mark soon after rapes Luke. Darren takes advantage of the situation and begins a relationship with Luke's girlfriend Mandy Richardson (Sarah Jayne Dunn). Dawson commented on this saying, "Darren liked Mandy even before he went to America so he was gutted when he came back to discover she had started going out with Luke. And all along, Luke knew that Darren wanted to get together with Mandy ... Luke has other things on his mind and seems to be ignoring Mandy, so Darren thinks it is the perfect opportunity to make his move". Before Darren asks Mandy out he confronts Luke who "gives him the green light". Dawson opined that although viewers may think Mandy and Darren are being "heartless" they don't know about Luke's attack so are not to blame. Dawson felt that initially the relationship is a "flirty kind of friendship" although Mandy realises she likes Darren and plans to use Darren as a means of reuniting with Luke. As Darren and Mandy spend more time together their relationship "develops". If Darren were to find out about Luke's rape, Dawson felt Darren would help Luke get "revenge" on Mark. He said Mandy would either be "shocked and turn to Darren for support" or "feel guilty about what she's done" and reunite with Luke. Dawson felt if this were to happen Darren would "try to shrug it off" although "deep down, he cares for Mandy". Dawson felt that Darren should become a "hero" to Luke, fixing all his problems which would rectify him beginning a relationship with Mandy.

Writers often focused on Darren's fractious relationship with his father, Jack Osborne (Jimmy McKenna). When Dawson was reintroduced into the series in 2003, his return plot explored their dynamic in depth. Darren resents Jack's lodger, Norman Sankofa (Jamie Luke), who he feels is stopping him from gaining his father's attention. Darren begins feuding with Norman and Dawson believed he "hated" sharing a room with Norman. Dawson told Joanne Tebbutt All About Soap that Darren continues to cause trouble and "emotionally blackmails" Jack, which results in a confrontation. Jack worries when Darren fails to return home, unaware that he is having casual sex with Mel Burton (Cassie Powney). Dawson revealed that Darren's behaviour continues to be bad, with him telling Mel their sex was "meaningless" and "she leaves in tears". Dawson explained that despite Darren being "cheeky and charming", it showcased that "most of the time he is a nasty piece of work." Jack reconsiders and tries to bond with his son. Jack's attempts to be a better father are disastrous. Jack introduces Darren to his friends, but they tell Darren that previously believed Jack did not have a son. Dawson described Darren as "understandably upset" and "feels that once again his dad has let him down." Dawson believed that Darren secretly "wants to get on better with his dad" but is "really bitter" and "insecure" because "he has never felt welcome or settled". Dawson added that Jack and Darren have "an interesting relationship" which meant they would "continue to clash".

Darren becomes embroiled in a feud with Scott Anderson (Daniel Hyde), and Scott sets fire to The Loft with Darren inside. Dawson said these scenes were some of his favourite because of the good scripts, and that he enjoyed working with Hyde. The scenes required a pyrotechnics specialist to come in and assist Dawson and Hyde through the scenes. While Darren is feuding with Scott he and Debbie Dean (Jodi Albert) have a brief relationship. Dawson said Darren's relationship with Debbie and feud with Scott were his "favourite" storylines as they were "more in-depth and show both sides of the character". Darren has a brief relationship with Steph Dean (Carley Stenson), with Stenson commenting that Steph "really loved him" even though he was a "dirty dog to her".

=== Gambling addiction ===
"He's hooked on gambling but also desperate to try and win back money to pay off his debts. It's a terrible situation to be in. It's like he has no control over what's happening to him. He can't stop because he has to win but he just ends up losing more and more. He's stealing again. He steals off quite a few people and tries to justify it by telling himself he'll pay them back as soon as he's won again. It's a kind of gambling fever ... He wants to stop desperately but he may not be able to do it by himself. He may need professional help. He'd just better sort himself out soon or he'll wreck his own life as well as his dad's!"

— Ashley Taylor Dawson explaining Darren's problem.

Darren begins gambling in 2008 and later his addiction causes him a great deal of trouble, leading him to steal from his family and ultimately losing everything. On his character's addiction, Dawson commented that Darren is initially on a "winning streak" but quickly begins to "lose everything, including Zoe Carpenter (Zoë Lister)". He felt that Darren is torn about his addiction because although he is aware of his problem he believes "his next big win is just around the corner". When talking to What's on TV about Darren's addiction, Dawson said it began slowly but spiralled out of control, thinking that gambling is easy after a few big wins. Eventually, Darren was willing to bet on everything, even "who's going to have toast for breakfast". Darren finally realises he has a problem when in spite of the fun, he loses everything as his debts increase. Darren begins counselling for his addiction but later plays a game of poker with Warren in which he loses his share of The Dog in the Pond. Dawson said this "devastated" Darren who can't convince Warren the poker game was "just a joke". Darren begins a "Bonnie and Clyde partnership" with Jessica Harris (Jennifer Biddall) which producer Bryan Kirkwood described as "very funny". Jessica then leaves the village in a "dramatic twist", leaving Darren in more debt in the process. Dawson said that Darren's gambling addiction had been one of his highlights in the show and described the storyline as "fantastic".

=== Fake death scam ===
This storyline, which was announced June 2008, was initially billed as Darren's father, Jack, being "at an all-time low" before finding a dead body which is "too good an opportunity for him and Darren to pass up". They swap Eamon Fisher's (Derek Halligan) identity with Jack's, before Jack is forced to "slope off into the night". The storyline was compared to John Darwin faking his own death with the Daily Record commenting, "Clearly, the news stories about John Darwin and his canoe haven't reached Chester" while the Sunday Mercury commented that Darren's guilt was deserved "in shades of the current John 'dead canoeist' Darwin court case".

After these comparisons Dawson confirmed that the storyline was planned ahead of the media coverage of the case, adding that he thought the storyline was "far fetched", adding that due to the storyline being a "sensitive" issue it was likely to cause controversy. Dawson explained that Darren initially thought faking Jack's death was a "brilliant idea" but put this down to lack of sleep and stress. Dawson commented that Darren and Jack are so desperate that "everything seemed easy", but added that they realise their actions were making the situation worse. Dawson felt that if Darren gets through the events without becoming bitter, twisted and cynical, then he could learn from his mistakes but "it could go the other way and he might blame everyone other than himself". Dawson commented that the fake death scam was his favourite time with the serial.

=== Relationships ===
==== Hannah and Suzanne Ashworth ====
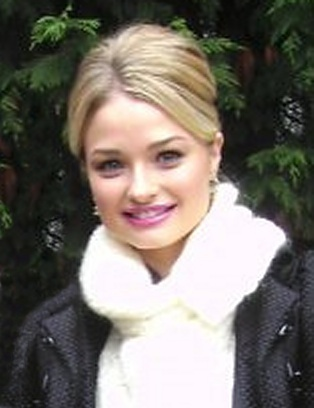
Emma Rigby (pictured) felt that Hannah married Darren for different reasons from Darren.

Darren and Hannah (Emma Rigby) go on a weekend away to Denmark with a rock 'n' roll band where they drunkenly marry in a "shotgun" fashion. What's on TV announced the storyline in June 2009. About the beginning of the storyline, "Hannah has gone off the rails of late, but even she manages to outdo herself when she and Darren tie the knot after a particularly boozy night in Denmark". Holy Soap said the wedding will leave fans "stunned" and described the pair as "odd". Dawson said, regarding the sudden marriage, that "Darren doesn’t suddenly fall in love with Hannah or vice-versa. It's just one of those mad, crazy things you do when you’ve had far too many drinks and your life is in a bit of a mess. They both regret it. They get home and their friends and families are horrified – especially Hannah's family".

Rigby said Hannah had married Darren to try to fit in and impress people. She added that Hannah would never have gone out with Darren willingly, "not even under the influence". She felt Hannah stayed married to Darren to annoy her parents and to get attention. Darren begins scheming with Cindy to scam The Dog. Darren decides to stay married to try to get The Dog back, so proposes that they do not get their marriage annulled to Hannah. Dawson said, regarding his plan to scam Hannah, that "Hannah wants an annulment and so does Darren … at first. The cogs begin to turn in his twisted mind after Cindy points out that being married to Hannah could get him The Dog back. He plans to pretend he's falling in love with her and, motivated by money, tries to make her fall in love with him".

Darren offers to leave Hollyoaks with Hannah but she rejects his offer and leaves Hollyoaks alone. E4 wrote, in regards to how the relationship affects Darren, that he "turned a corner after marrying Hannah Ashworth. Darren became a true friend to her and helped her through her eating disorders".

Darren begins an affair with Hannah's mother, Suzanne (Suzanne Hall), whose son Rhys (Andrew Moss) is Darren's friend. Dawson explained the romance, saying, "They're both lonely and there's a bit of a thrill for Darren as she's an older woman. It's just a bit of fun for both of them". Darren supports Suzanne through her marital problems; they grow close and begin an affair, until Rhys exposes them. Neville Ashworth (Jim Millea), Suzanne's husband, throws her out of her home, forcing Darren to allow her to move in with him. Suzanne decides to leave Darren and move to Spain with Neville. When asked who Darren would choose between Suzanne and Cindy, Dawson said, "Cindy any time". In early 2011, Suzanne returns, and announces that she's pregnant with Darren's twins. She gives birth to twins before she moves in with Darren and girlfriend Nancy Hayton (Jessica Fox). Nancy ends her relationship with Darren. In March, Cindy Cunningham (Stephanie Waring) returns and pays Suzanne to leave the village so she can have Darren to herself, which Suzanne accepts.

==== Cindy Cunningham ====
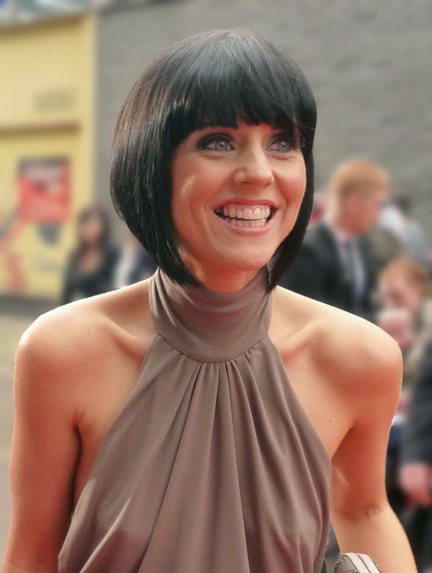
Stephanie Waring (pictured) felt that Darren and Cindy are "made for each other" but bring out the worst in each other.

I think up to now Cindy has been the closest thing because there's a bit of longevity in his interest in her, whereas normally he only has little flings. I think before that probably Zoe meant a lot to him, but Cindy is the most compatible.

— Ashley Taylor Dawson on Darren and Cindy. (2009).

When Cindy moves back to Hollyoaks Village she and Darren soon begin a casual relationship. Darren and Cindy later begin to show genuine affection for each other by helping each other through difficult times in their lives. Dawson has said that Cindy was the most suitable for Darren out of his previous relationships. In an interview with What's on TV, when asked who Darren would choose out of Suzanne and Cindy, Dawson said, "Cindy any time. He'd really like to make a go of things with her". Dawson also commented on the relationship calling the relationship "interesting" because Cindy is Darren's "first port of call".

Waring has said she felt Darren and Cindy are "one and the same - they're the same person with different body parts". She felt the pair are "made for each other" but when together are "destructive". Waring elaborated, saying that unlike Cindy and Tony, Darren and Cindy "bring out the worst in each other". She felt that if Cindy was with Darren, Darren "could be the love of her life", but felt Cindy would be sensible and choose the relationship best for her daughter's welfare.

In a later storyline, Cindy announces her intentions to marry Tony Hutchinson (Nick Pickard) and scam him, a scam Darren later joins. Darren marries Hannah Ashworth and he and Cindy plan to scam The Dog. Their intentions to scam their respective partners, Dawson said, indicates that the pair are "two sides of the same coin". He added that they are motivated by money which made Hannah and Tony "useful to them", and commented that he wouldn't be surprised if they worked together to get what they want from their partners.

Although Darren begs her not to marry Tony, she goes ahead with the wedding, and Darren and Cindy later plan to scam Tony, which Dawson called "cold-hearted". He added that Darren wouldn't "have any problems with stabbing Tony in the back even now because Darren's that kind of guy". Pickard said, about the beginning of this storyline, "Cindy is with Darren and she's realised I’ve got a bit of money. They’re scamming me!" Darren and Cindy begin sleeping together and are caught by Tony but do not continue to see each other. Cindy and Tony divorce; Cindy begins a relationship with Alistair Longford (Terence Harvey) and agrees to marry him. Darren proposes to Cindy on the day of her wedding but she declines stating she wants to give Holly a better life and more financial security which Alistair can give her.

Cindy returns in 2011 after Alistair dies and attempts to rekindle her romance with Darren but fails. Dawson later admitted that Darren may still be tempted by Cindy before adding that Cindy is "shocked" that Darren "would go for anyone but her". Waring felt that the pair would always have a "spark between them" but any romance between them ends when Cindy discovers that Darren has become a father and is engaged to Nancy. She felt that Cindy "gets over it pretty quickly" but Cindy "has her moments with Darren" as Darren is "the only person who [Cindy] lets her guard down in front of. With everyone else, a big wall comes up and she doesn't let anybody else see that vulnerable side".

Cindy begins helping Darren plan his wedding to girlfriend Nancy. Waring felt Cindy's feelings had been "reawakened" through this storyline, adding that they never "fully went away". Waring opined that Darren asking Cindy to help plan his wedding made her feel "needed and wanted". Waring felt that Cindy does not plan to split Darren and Nancy up but that there is "a little part of [Cindy] that thinks, 'Surely he's going to choose me?" Waring added that when Cindy is trying on wedding dresses for Nancy Cindy thinks "that it should be her". Cindy attempts to kiss Darren which Waring said is "the worst possible thing she could have done, because she thinks it means something but Darren thinks otherwise". Dawson said Darren is no longer interested in Cindy. Waring said Darren telling Cindy she will have to let him go leaves her "devastated". Waring added that when Cindy realises how much Darren likes Nancy she says "that if Nancy is who Darren wants, then she'll just have to accept it". Dawson felt that Darren's relationship with Cindy was "just sex", adding that "it was more of a raw attraction rather than something that would work well in the long-term". Dawson added that it was good to revisit the relationship as the pair have been through a lot together. He added that since his relationship with Cindy "Darren has matured ... Their recent goodbye scene was a great one to bring a bit of closure to what they had".

==== Nancy Hayton ====
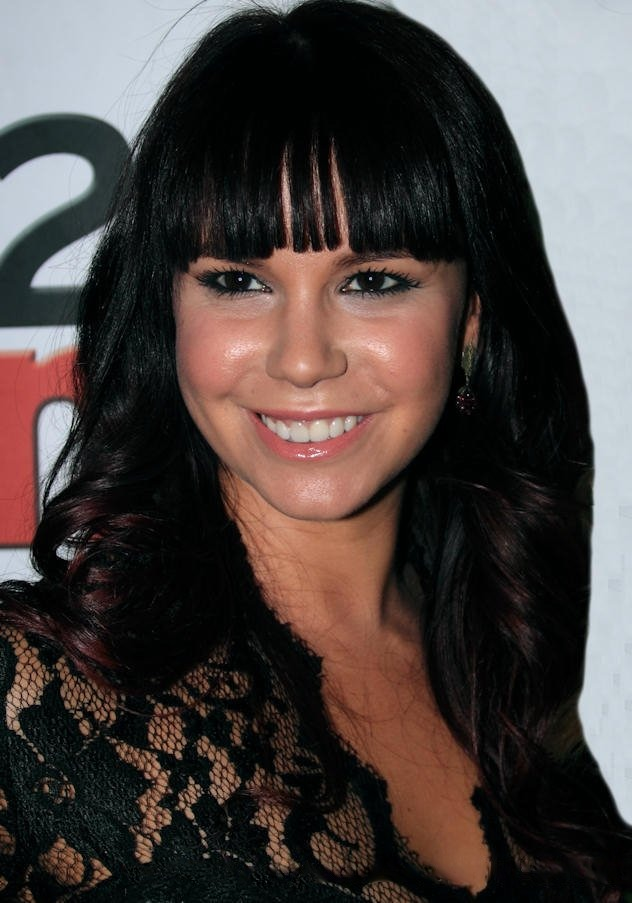
Jessica Fox (pictured) originally thought the pairing would not be long term.

Darren and Nancy begin a relationship when Darren, Nancy and Nancy's housemates begin online dating in December 2010. Darren is due to go on a date he has arranged and Nancy comes to watch him, Darren's date does not arrive. As the evening continues, the pair realise there is an attraction between them and agree to go home together. Dawson said that the pair have "always sort of hated each other" as they are opposites, explaining that "She's a feminist and he's a male chauvinist pig!" He felt for the pair to begin a relationship is a "case of opposites attracting - for some reason it works". Dawson added that through the pair's "pompous ways" they have both been through "hard times and been through them with each other because they've known each other for so long". He commented that the pair have "never seen eye-to-eye, but I think that when they sit down and chat they realise they have a lot more in common than they think. In the past they just didn't want to accept that". E4 described the relationship this way: "She's chalk and he's definitely more than a bit cheesy, but there you have it; Darren and Nancy (Dancy) are now officially an item! They’re the original odd-couple!" It is also confirmed that Darren interrupted Silas Blissett (Jeff Rawle) when Silas attempted to kill Nancy.

Dawson added that Darren is "totally in love with Nancy. Nancy has really calmed Darren down". Fox added, regarding the beginning of their relationship, "It was a relationship that came out of nowhere, but the writers and the audience were so charmed by Nancy and Darren together that it's kept going". When asked if they were surprised at being initially paired up Dawson said, "Yes, i was. The scene in which they got together was absolutely hilarious. Darren just looked up and there she was!" before Fox added "I never thought they were going to last, but we just went for it full throttle". Fox later explained that the pairing "was only ever intended to be quite a short-term thing".

The pair become engaged after Darren proposes, although the proposal is accidental rather than planned. Dawson felt that it was too soon for Darren to consider marrying Nancy. Shortly after their engagement, Suzanne returns and announces she is expecting Darren's babies. Regarding Darren being the father of twin babies and if his relationship with Nancy would survive, Dawson felt the situation was too difficult for Nancy but for Darren it was fine. He felt that the story was "interesting" and hoped the pairing would survive as they have "something special". Darren and Nancy split up when he moves Suzanne and the babies into Nancy's flat. They resume their romance after Suzanne leaves and takes the children with her.

Fox commented that the pair would make good parents but have "a lot of growing up to do themselves", before adding that she hoped "Nancy and Darren would stay together for a long time" as she enjoyed the pairing. Fox later added that she'd "love a big soap wedding". Dawson said, about the couple's future: "Darren might stray if Nancy continues to push him away, but I think he's more paranoid about her leaving him. He's been a good boy far too long - I want him to man up and get his head together".

On 19 December 2011 it was announced that a future storyline would see Darren plan his wedding as a surprise to Nancy. It was announced that Darren would be tempted back into his gambling addiction. Series producer Emma Smithwick commented on the storyline explaining that because Darren was organising the wedding it was "never going to be as smooth as if somebody else was organising it". She added that the wedding was a "long time coming" for the couple but there going to be "a few obstacles in the way", some self-imposed and some caused by external forces. She added that the event would be in "true Darren style". Dawson felt that at this point in the relationship Darren is "besotted" with Nancy. He explained that Darren feels Nancy is good for him but Darren almost feels undeserving of her. Dawson felt that Nancy was the love of Darren's life. Dawson commented that Darren had "been through the mill" but "for once in his life, Darren is happy". Dawson put this down to Darren getting the Dog in the Pond back and his relationship with Nancy. On why Darren plans the wedding Dawson said: "He wants to show Nancy how much he loves her and thinks a surprise wedding will do that". He explained that due to lack of funds Darren will "have to call in a lot of favours but he hasn't got many friends". Dawson felt that Darren would have to see the idea through to the end, even if Darren would end up "upside-down in mud". On how he felt the wedding would turn out Dawson said that "it could be the tackiest thing ever" but that it would be "hilarious". On the wedding and Darren's feelings, Dawson said that his character is "incredibly excited about it, especially after all the hard work and planning that he's been doing in secret for weeks and weeks". Dawson said that Darren feels like the wedding is "going to be the most perfect day possible and he just can't wait to see the look on Nancy's face when she realises what he's been up to". Dawson went on to add that "things don't go as he planned". Dawson said that he wants the wedding to go ahead, saying "after all this it would be lovely to see them get married, but you never know with soaps. I think they can be happy together". Dawson felt that the pair are the "perfect match and are incredibly sweet together. Darren brings out Nancy's fun side and she gives his life a bit of order". Dawson went on to say he feels the pair are "destined to be the Jack and Vera of Hollyoaks!" Nancy's mother, Margaret Hayton (Darryl Fishwick), arrives in the village. Fox said that Margaret believes Darren is "not good enough for Nancy" so begins trying to split the pair up. Fox said that Margaret tries to "make Nancy doubt her relationship with Darren". Nancy witnesses Darren and Cindy in an embrace which Fox said confirms to Nancy that "everything her mum is saying is true - that Darren doesn't love her and he has been having an affair". When questioned if the pair can get through their troubles Fox said: "I hope so! Myself and Ash have had an awful lot of fun working together, so I'd love to see a 'happily ever after'. Well, as much as it can be happy in soapland!" Fox felt that if Nancy were to discover Darren's plans for their wedding she would be "horrified" although she would "see that he has good intentions". Fox later said that Nancy "really wants to get married, have babies and be happy" with Darren, although Nancy may not ready to be a mother "just yet".

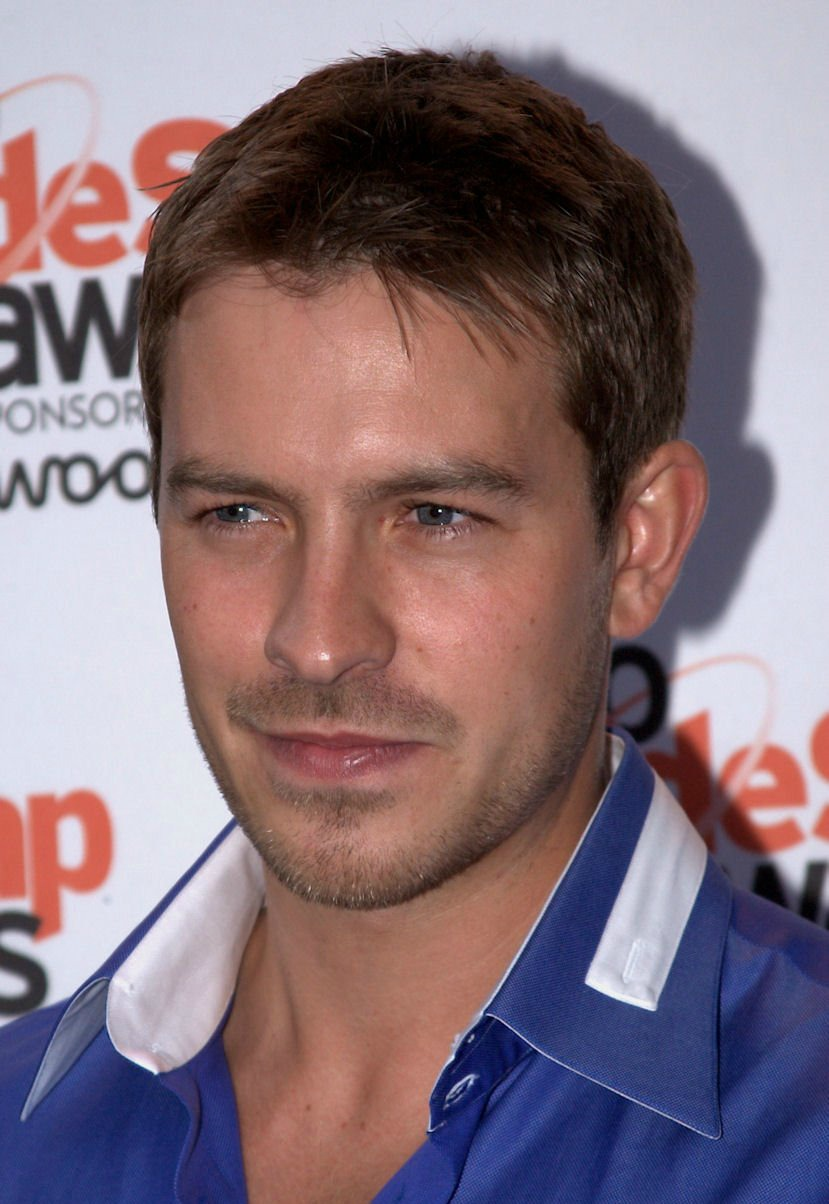
Ashley Taylor Dawson (pictured) said that Darren becoming a father changed him.

Darren and Nancy marry. Dawson explained that Darren felt "relief" that the wedding went ahead as he "often worried that Nancy is too good for him". Dawson commented that he thinks "the characters work well together and they challenge each other all the time. It's quite comical, even when they're arguing. In many ways, Darren is a typical man and Nancy is a typical woman". On how married life will affect the couple Dawson said: "it will change them is by giving a bit of solidity to their relationship. It proves to both of them how much they mean to each other, so if anything, I think it will make them stronger". Explaining why Darren went ahead with planning the surprise wedding Dawson said: "he's got the pub back, he feels like he's learned all his lessons, and he's come full circle. This time around, Darren doesn't want to mess anything up and wants to get everything right. Now that they're married, having children is something that they'll look at in the future".

=== Fatherhood ===
Darren's ex-girlfriend, Suzanne, returns, pregnant by Darren with twins. Dawson said, "At first [Darren] doesn’t believe her and he thinks it's a wind-up. When she threatens to go back to Spain he realises it's not what he wants and he stops her. He decides to man up and be a dad to his kids". A few days later, Suzanne, with Darren's help, gives birth to twins Jack and Francine. Dawson said that at first, Darren chooses to be in denial about it wants nothing to do with Suzanne because he does not want to lose Nancy. Dawson noted that the birth of Darren's babies is messy and surprising. Darren finds himself in a situation he never expected when he has to deliver the babies and accept responsibility for them. Dawson stated, "I think it's a moment where Darren changes a little bit". Dawson added that Darren does "step up to the mark" and "matures very quickly". Dawson felt that Darren enjoys being a father and it gives him a "purpose in life" which he has never had before. Dawson explained that Darren usually thinks of himself but is now thinking of the babies. E4, regarding Darren becoming a father, commented that due to his previous antics, he would not be an ideal candidate for "Father of the year". The storyline is resolved when Cindy pays Suzanne £200,000 to return to Spain so that she can have Darren to herself. Suzanne accepts the money and leaves, taking Francine and Jack with her and leaving Darren heartbroken.

== Storylines ==
=== Backstory ===
Darren Osborne was born as the result of an affair between Jack Osborne (Jimmy McKenna) and Sandy Roscoe (Gillian Taylforth). Sandy, married to Alan Roscoe at the time, was forced into giving Darren up by her husband so she could save her marriage.

=== 1996–2000 ===
Darren arrives in Hollyoaks with parents Jack and Celia (Carol Noakes) from America. Celia discovers that Jack has been having an affair with Dawn Cunningham (Lisa Williamson) and returns to America, taking Darren with her. Darren returns to live with his father two years later. Darren becomes friends with Luke Morgan (Gary Lucy); together they stand up to bully Mark Gibbs (Colin Parry). When Mark's bullying of Luke becomes more severe, Darren decides to befriend Mark in the hope he will go easy on Luke. His attempts do not succeed and Mark rapes Luke. After the attack, Luke's relationship with Mandy Richardson (Sarah Jayne Dunn) begins to fail, so Darren takes advantage of the situation and begins a relationship with Mandy. Darren suggests that Luke might be gay and that he was responsible for his own rape. Mandy breaks up with Darren. Darren trashes his sister Ruth's (Terri Dwyer) flat and is evicted; he leaves the village soon afterwards.

=== 2003–present ===
Shortly after Darren returns to Hollyoaks village from America three years later, Darren begins a skimming scam which is found out by his boss Scott Anderson (Daniel Hyde) who refuses to give him time off work. In retaliation he plants incriminating evidence on Scott's computer before calling the police. Scott sets fire to The Loft with Darren inside, but Scott becomes trapped and Darren leaves him for dead. Darren is told no trace of Scott has been found, but Scott is alive and sends threatening postcards to Darren. Scott attacks Darren, who pleads with Scott not to kill him, but the police arrive shortly after.

Darren and Debbie Dean (Jodi Albert) have a brief relationship, but it ends when her boyfriend Dan Hunter (Andrew McNair) returns from prison. He later begins a relationship with Steph Dean (Carley Stenson), but ends it when she has an epileptic seizure, and he begins dating Zoe Carpenter (Zoë Lister). Darren begins gambling, and becomes addicted. The relationship ends when Darren has sex with Zoe's best friend, Jessica Harris (Jennifer Biddall) after he and Zoe fight over his gambling addiction. Darren steals Frankie Osborne's (Helen Pearson) jewellery to settle a debt with a loan shark, and blames Barry "Newt" Newton (Nico Mirallegro), who is sent back to care. Jack, unaware of Darren's addiction, gives him half The Dog in recognition of how much he has matured. Darren begins counselling for his gambling addiction, but later plays poker with Warren Fox (Jamie Lomas) and loses his half of The Dog to him. Jack and Frankie discover that Darren has stolen Frankie's jewellery and lost his half of The Dog. Jack then has a heart attack which Darren blames himself for.

Warren offers to sell his share of The Dog back if Darren came pay him £100,000 within 48 hours. Darren and Jessica steal £3000 from Evissa which they take to they casino. Darren wins £200,000 which Jessica steals before leaving. When Warren causes Jack trouble, Jack blames Darren and later disowns him. Jack, Frankie, Newt and Louise Summers (Roxanne McKee) are held hostage at The Dog. Darren tries to help them, but is shot in a confrontation with their captor. Darren is taken to hospital where he recovers. Warren later gives Jack his share of The Dog. Warren bribes Darren with £100,000 to help frame Jake Dean (Kevin Sacre) for the murder of Sean Kennedy (Matthew Jay Lewis). Darren takes the money to the casino, where he loses all of it overnight. To solve the families' financial problems Darren and Jack fake Jack's death. Darren and Cindy Cunningham (Stephanie Waring) begin a casual relationship. Upon learning the McQueens are in danger Darren and Jack leave to try to rescue them from Niall Rafferty (Barry Sloane). The church is blown up and Darren helps rescue the McQueens from the rubble. Darren turns himself in to the police after Jack refuses to leave the scene and the insurance scam is discovered. He is released four months later.

Frankie and Jack discover that Darren took a £100,000 bribe from Warren to get Jake to confess to Sean's murder, and then gambled the money away despite the family being in debt. Jack banishes his son. Darren becomes depressed when his family ignore him and begins staying in his flat, refusing to leave. Cindy convinces Tony Hutchinson (Nick Pickard) to give Darren a job at a charity event at Il Gnosh. Darren and Hannah Ashworth (Emma Rigby) drunkenly marry. Darren begins scheming with Cindy to scam The Dog. Darren and Hannah have sex, but Darren ends his relationship with Hannah and with Cindy begins planning to scam Hannah and Tony. Darren and Cindy have sex and are caught by Tony. During Hollyoaks Later, Darren attempts to convince Cindy not to marry Tony. They marry despite Darren's attempts to stop the ceremony. Hannah moves into Darren's flat after she and her parents argue. Darren is stabbed by Jamie (Finn Jones) while protecting Hannah. Darren recovers and offers to leave Hollyoaks with Hannah but she rejects his offer and leaves alone.

Darren and Cindy have sex after she is neglected by Tony, who uncovers the pair in a romantic clinch. Darren and Suzanne have sex and begin an affair. Rhys exposes their affair and Suzanne moves in with Darren. Suzanne later moves to Spain with Neville. Darren moves in with Jack after they reconcile. Darren fails to win back Cindy's affections as she marries Alistair, but she gives him a brooch before leaving. Darren begins having sex with Nancy and shortly after, Darren begins a relationship with Nancy. Darren proposes and she accepts before Suzanne returns, Darren rescued Nancy from Silas Blissett (Jeff Rawle) when Silas was about to strangle her with rope to death and announces that she's pregnant with Darren's twins. She gives birth on 21 January 2011 to Jack and Francine. Suzanne and the twins move into Nancy's flat which leads Nancy to end her relationship with Darren. When Cindy returns, she pays Suzanne to leave the village, so she can have Darren to herself. Her plan fails, when Nancy and Darren reconcile.

Darren begins secretly planning his wedding to Nancy. Darren is tempted to gamble at a casino by Brendan Brady (Emmett J. Scanlan) but resists. Nancy's mother, Margaret, makes Nancy doubt her relationship with Darren. Nancy believes Darren is having an affair with Cindy and decides to leave Hollyoaks village to live in Canada. Darren tells Nancy about the wedding he has been planning. She forgives him and the pair marry. Nancy later discovers she is pregnant with Darren's child but she later suffers a miscarriage. Nancy later discovers she is again pregnant with Darren's child. Nancy later suffers a miscarriage. Nancy and Darren later discover she is again pregnant. Nancy goes into premature labour and gives birth to their son three months premature by emergency caesarean. Darren and Nancy are told that their son may suffer brain damage. During her pregnancy Nancy helped her friend Mitzeee Minniver (Rachel Shenton) after she escaped from prison, making Nancy stressed. Darren blames Nancy for their son's premature birth and tells her he will not forgive her if their son dies. Darren and Nancy name their son Oscar, who turns out to be deaf. This causes problems in Darren and Nancy's relationship, with Darren wanting their son to go through an operation for his hearing but Nancy not wanting to. The stress results in Nancy becoming addicted to painkillers. Darren eventually finds out about Nancy's painkiller addiction leaving him furious and Nancy moves away for a short time. Darren and Nancy become friends with Sienna Blake (Anna Passey), and let her move in with them as a full-time nanny.

When Tom goes missing, Darren is desperate to find him. Thinking that Tom has run away, he assumes that he will come home if Nancy is there and convinces Sienna to change her statement about Nancy. Nancy is released from the mental institute because of this. However, it is revealed that Sienna actually kidnapped Tom and kept him hostage in a basement. Tom is able to escape and along with Nancy, they expose Sienna for everything. Sienna attacks Nancy causing her to have temporary brain damage and attempts to kill Tom, Charlie and Oscar although they are saved and Nancy recovers. Following Darren's treatment of Nancy, things are hard between them and get even worse when Nancy attempts to get revenge on Darren. However, they eventually reconcile and get engaged again. However, things only get worse when Sienna blackmails Darren to get Tom to change his statement or she'll create even more problems for the Osbornes. Following a heart attack, Darren is given angina spray however Sienna takes this while Darren is on a camping trip and Nancy leaves him on his own on the trip following an argument. Darren starts to have a heart attack and Sienna, realizing what she's done, saves him at the last minute.

On New Year's Eve, after bringing Esther and her girlfriend Kim Butterfield (Daisy Wood-Davis) to a club he is mistaken for a taxi-man giving him the idea to start up his own taxi company 'Daz Cabs'. His company got off to a rocky start as he was unable to know where he was going and got Dr. Charles S'avage (Andrew Greenough) late for two important meetings. However Darren teamed up with Kim to force Dr. S'avage to give him the hospital taxi contract and recruited Tony to work as his receptionist. However they came to blows over the name and design of the company, but resolved their differences with Darren moving into the boarding house, Tony working as a taxi driver and Maxine Minniver (Nikki Sanderson) takes over as receptionist.

Darren and Maxine start to develop feeling for each as Darren supports her getting custody of her daughter, Minnie, from her abusive ex-partner Patrick Blake (Jeremy Sheffield). They later start up a relationship which Patrick tries to wreck so Darren retaliates by trying to frame Patrick. On Freddie Roscoe (Charlie Clapham) and Lindsey Butterfield's (Sophie Austin) wedding day, Darren witnesses Joe Roscoe (Ayden Callaghan) try to shoot Freddie with Grace Black's (Tamara Wall) gun. Trevor Royle (Greg Wood) orders Darren to get rid of the gun but Patrick records him burying it and blackmails him into saying Maxine is an alcoholic and she loses custody of Minnie. Darren later finds Maxine on top of a church roof and pleads with her not to jump as Minnie needs her. Later when they are alone he reveals that Patrick blackmailed him and he couldn't go to prison as he needs to be there for Oscar and Charlie. Maxine forgives him and they remain together. Darren helps Maxine set up her own cab business Minnie Cabs so she stands a chance at getting Minnie back. When Darren finds out that Patrick is dying he tells Patrick that he is sticking by Maxine and that when he's dead he'll be dancing on his grave.

Darren and Mandy later start an affair behind Nancy and Luke's back. They have sex and when Luke comes in, Darren hides under the bed. Luke proposes to Mandy and she accepts. Darren pressures Mandy into telling Luke the truth and tells her he is going to tell Nancy, but later changes his mind. When Sienna is being stalked, she suspects it is Darren. When she asks Darren to fix a broken pipe for her, she knocks him out and ties him to a radiator. Darren convinces Sienna it isn't him and confesses to having an affair. Sienna promises to keep it a secret but later blackmails him into giving her two grand. Darren and Mandy end their affair on multiple occasions but keep turning to each other for support. When Nancy decides to foster Brooke Hathaway (Tylan Grant), the daughter of Becca's killer, Darren is against the idea but Nancy ignores him. After a talk with Grace, Darren decides to split up with Nancy and tells her their marriage is over. He runs into Mandy and they decide to run away together. Nancy suffers an MS attack and tells Darren and Jack that she will be in a wheelchair for a while. Darren meets up with Mandy and tells her needs to be there for Nancy and they break up.

== Reception ==
"He's the typical blonde hair, blue-eyed boy that can ruffle the feathers of every female he comes into contact with. Darren has the ability of charming his way out of every situation and he can play a married woman like putty in his hands if he so wishes. Not only has he got the looks and the cocky arrogance that make him a bad boy but he's also got the body of a fire-fighter making him the perfect pin up for Hollyoaks. However, Darren is known for being better at making enemies than friends in Chester just as much as he is known for starting up affairs".

— Amy Duncan of the Metro, describing Darren

Dawson was nominated for "Sexiest Male" at the 2004 British Soap Awards, for "Sexiest Male" and "Best Villain" at the 2005 Inside Soap Awards. and for "Funniest Performance" in 2007 at the Inside Soap Awards. In 2009, he was nominated for "Best Actor" at the British Soap Awards, "Best Actor" and "Funniest Performance" at the Inside Soap Awards. Dawson was nominated for "Best Actor", "Funniest Performance" and "Sexiest Male" in 2010 for his role as Darren at the Inside Soap Awards. Also in 2010, at the British Soap Awards, Dawson was nominated for the "Sexiest Male" award. In 2011 he received a nomination for "Sexiest Male" at the British Soap Awards. In 2012 Dawson was again nominated for "Best Actor" and for "Best On-Screen Partnership" at the British Soap Awards. In 2012 Dawson was nominated for "Best Actor" at the 2012 TV Choice Awards. At the 2012 Inside Soap Awards Dawson was nominated for "Best Actor" and "Sexiest Male". In August 2017, Dawson was longlisted for Funniest Male at the Inside Soap Awards. He made the viewer-voted shortlist, but lost out to Dominic Brunt, who portrays Paddy Kirk in Emmerdale. In 2025, Darren and Nancy received a "Best Soap Couple" nomination at the Digital Spy Reader Awards.

Darren was listed in "The Top 100 Soap Hunks of All Time" by What's on TV. Dawson was 8th in the "Sexiest Soap Stars" MSN poll. An Inside Soap critic commented that Darren was initially a "freckly auburn-haired forgettable schoolboy" when played by Booth. They added that Booth's Darren is a "very distant recollection" while Dawson has "made the part his own in such a big way that we've decided to wipe the other one from history".

His character was branded a "rat" and "dastardly" for splitting up Gina and Emily by the Daily Record. Upon Darren's 2003 return to Hollyoaks, the Sunday Mercury said he had become "even more of a pain in the neck". They later called the character "a really nasty piece of work" and when he stole from his father, they questioned if Jack would "see what he's really like". Inside Soap's Peter Griffiths referred to Darren as one of the serial's "reliable stalwarts", saying it was a "relief" when he appeared and added that Darren was one of the characters who can "be relied upon to deliver". He added that the "tried-and-tested" characters helped the show through its rough patches and that they should be given the storylines they deserved. Griffiths' colleague Sarah maintained that Darren was the only part of the show that held her interest. The Press and Journal described Darren's time on the soap, saying: "He languished in prison for helping his father fake his own death, has battled a crippling gambling addiction and has been known to steal people's girlfriends and break up relationships".

Kris Green of Digital Spy responded negatively to Darren's marriage to Hannah, saying "I still have NO idea why the storyliners thought it was a good idea to marry them off". Green later said that Rigby's on-screen partnership with Jamie in Hollyoaks Later worked well and was "better than Hannah and Darren". Green later dubbed Darren and Suzanne "Suzarren" due to their dangerous liaison, while the affair was described as "sizzling" by the Daily Star.

Roz Laws of the Sunday Mercury said Darren and Cindy's scheming make them a perfect match. Laws commented that Darren and Cindy's relationship is more about "making money out of others' misery" rather than romance, and sarcastically commented that the pair were "nice" after they decide to con Hannah and Tony. On Darren and Cindy's intention to scam Tony the Daily Star wrote: "Cindy and Darren are perfect for each other. They are both greedy money-grabbers and it isn’t long before they are looking for a way to fleece Tony for all they can get". MSN said the sexual chemistry between Darren and Cindy was undeniable after Cindy's return.

Digital Spy's Daniel Kilkelly questioned whether Darren could adjust to fatherhood, while What's on TV labelled him a "doting father". Once Nancy became pregnant again Claire Crick of All About Soap said "At last – some good news in Hollyoaks for once! Our favourite soapy couple, Nancy and Darren, discover they’re going to be parents once again in tonight's episode, and we’ve got our fingers (and toes!) crossed that it works out for them this time". She said that "with Darren's cheeky escapades and Nancy's no-messing attitude, they’ll make the perfect parents and we can’t wait to see them with a little one". Crick went on to say "while Darren might be dad to twins already (remember them? You could be forgiven for forgetting they even existed – it seems Darren already has!), we think he's got potential to be great daddy material".

Virgin Media criticised the character's original dress sense stating "he might be male, but that doesn't mean Darren can escape the fashion police. He may have gone to prison once already, but with his chunky gold jewellery and sinister string vests, it won't be long before he is carted away in cuffs for his crimes against style". Fellow cast member Jessica Forrest who plays Leanne Holiday opined that the character's style was the best style of any character from the show but "back in the day... with the string vests and highlighted hair".

Producer Bryan Kirkwood said that he thought Dawson was a "brilliant actor", and added, "Ashley's one of those people that can do comedy and pathos within the blink of an eye". Kirkwood said that "Darren's one of my favourite characters". Fellow producer Paul Marquess spoke positively of Dawson's performance in an interview with Digital Spy, stating, "I think Ashley Taylor Dawson, who plays Darren, is a really strong actor, and by the end of this year we'll see a very different side to his character". Co-star Kieron Richardson commented on Dawson's performance as Darren, calling Dawson one of the serial's "strongest actors", adding that Dawson compelled him to watch when he was on screen. Richardson added that Dawson "makes me laugh, he does comedy really well and he does vulnerability really well".
