= Izzy Davies =

- Hollyoaks character
- Portrayed by: Elize du Toit
- Duration: 2000–2004, 2007
- First appearance: 21 September 2000
- Last appearance: 30 October 2007
- Introduced by: Jo Hallows (2000); Bryan Kirkwood (2007)
In-universe information
- Mother: Patty Cornwell
- Husband: Ben Davies

Izzy Davies (also Cornwell) is a fictional character from the British Channel 4 soap opera Hollyoaks, played by Elize du Toit. She made her first appearance in 2000 before leaving in 2004. The character then briefly returned in October 2007.

== Casting ==
Elize du Toit was cast in the Hollyoaks: On the Pull campaign to find new young actors to appear in the show during the Edinburgh auditions where she was called back for further auditions in Liverpool and the role of Izzy was created for her. The other three chosen were Andrew Somerville (Theo Sankofa), Lesley Johnston (Laura Burns) and Marcus Patric (Ben Davies).

In 2004, it was reported du Toit had been axed from the show in a soap "massacre".

== Development ==
In 2002, producers hired Tracey Childs to play Izzy's mother, Patty Cornwell. Allison Maund from Inside Soap reported that Izzy would not be impressed with the arrival of her mother. She added Patty is snobbish and makes it known she is used to a better standard of living than what Izzy is experiencing in the village.

== Storylines ==
Izzy arrived in Hollyoaks as a student and as Tony Hutchinson’s (Nick Pickard) tenant. She was saved from drowning in the college swimming pool by Adam Morgan (David Brown). Adam instantly fell in love with Izzy, and dumped Geri Hudson (Joanna Taylor) for her. Thus began a war of words between Geri and Izzy. Izzy started dating Adam, but lasted a short while after discovering he had exposed her by putting cameras up in Tony's house for a film project, and Geri had also been involved. Izzy's and Geri's rivalry continued for over a year, climaxing in their one-on-one combat in Game 4 IT (a charity event), when Geri managed to beat Izzy. Izzy then went on to move at The Dog in The Pond, and had also started working there. She started dating hard man Dan Hunter (Andrew McNair), but that did not work out because he was not honest with her. Izzy went on to build a friendly rivalry with fireman Ben where she got him to believe that she liked to have sex in public places. She took him to an empty top of a bus, blindfolded him, and made him take his clothes off, leaving him naked in the streets of Chester.

From there on, Izzy and Ben began to complete each other, but on a serious side, things began to fall downhill for Izzy. Her parents' marriage split up and she was repeatedly harassed by Scott Anderson (Daniel Hyde). She confided a lot in Tony, who supported her through difficult times, and shortly the pair became Hollyoaks's most unlikely couple. However, it was not to last when Tony's ex-fiancée Julie Matthews returned and started working with Tony at Il Gnosh. Unexpectedly Izzy got engaged with Tony, but Izzy had to make a promise to Tony that she would keep it a secret. Izzy was horrified when she discovered that Tony was also engaged to Julie. This led to Izzy dumping him. Her harassment from Scott continued when he started telling her how sorry he was and that he wanted to be given another chance.

Scott started pressuring her until Ben came to her rescue. From there on, Izzy began to form a strong bond with Ben as the pair tried to wind each other up, but soon Izzy started falling for Ben. It was pride getting in her way of asking Ben out, however. Having underachieved with a 2:2 degree, Izzy decided to move on from Hollyoaks and go travelling with Chloe. After two months, Izzy returned to Hollyoaks as she realised that she had to make a go of things with Ben, but was hurt when Ben did not pay much attention on her return. Having a minor accident outside Il Gnosh, Ben had rushed to Izzy's bedside at hospital and told her that he wanted to marry her. The pair finally got together as they awaited for their wedding, as Izzy had introduced a sex ban on Ben until their wedding day. Scott was desperate for Izzy not to marry Ben, and the night before her wedding day, in a desperate attempt for her not to marry Ben, Scott confessed to Izzy that Ben slept with Emma Chambers (Georgina Redhead) and she is pregnant with his child. Shocked and in disbelief, Izzy confronted Ben on their wedding day, and he admitted that he slept with Emma while Izzy was travelling.

Not sure what to do, Izzy decided to give Ben another chance as the pair tied the knot. Having come back from her honeymoon, Izzy found it more difficult than she thought it would be to deal with the attention that Ben was giving to Emma over their child Arthur. Convinced that the only way to get Ben's attention was to fall pregnant, Izzy became pregnant, but within two months she lost their child. Suffering and depressed, Izzy could not cope with the depression and further suffered when she was told by the doctor that she could not have children. Izzy felt that she could not give Ben what she wanted and decided to do the unthinkable by sleeping with Scott, in a bid to end all ties with Ben. She told a devastated Ben about her actions, leading him to throw her out. A few weeks later, both Scott and Ben called on Izzy's doorstep, each pleading Izzy to give them another chance. Izzy told Scott she wanted nothing to do with him, while she told Ben that their marriage was over but that she would always love him.

She returned to Hollyoaks in October 2007 to visit her old flame Tony Hutchinson on his 30th Birthday. She clashed with his girlfriend Jacqui McQueen (Claire Cooper) after they were wearing the same dress, but they eventually smoothed things over. She comforted Jacqui about her infertility, saying she had been in the same place when she was married to Ben, but Tony and Jacqui had a much stronger relationship than she had with Ben. Jacqui apologized for misjudging Izzy.

== Reception ==
Virgin Media profiled some of Hollyoaks' "hottest females" in their opinion, of Izzy they stated: "Izzy was the poshest totty Hollyoaks has ever seen. Not without her fair share of grit, after suffering a miscarriage, Izzy destroyed her own marriage and left Hollyoaks, much to the distress of men all over Britain." Lorna Cooper of MSN TV called Izzy one of soaps forgotten characters and stated that she grew into one of the serial's a key characters because of her complicated relationships. An Inside Soap reporter praised the show's serial killer storyline. They stated it was "the perfect way to remove the endless stream of golden-topped clones in the show." They suggested murdering Izzy "would be a public service" to free viewers of "years of her ceaseless moaning and meddling." The episode centric to Izzy's hen do party was chosen as part of the Hollyoaks Favourites series, a compilation of past memorable episode of the show. Writers from All About Soap assessed that Izzy and Ben "used to row all the time" and that their engagement "hasn't changed a thing". They quipped "they have trouble saying hello without snarling at one another." When Gordon Cunningham (Bernard Latham) and Helen Cunningham (Kathryn George) were killed off in a car crash storyline, Lucy Lather from Inside Soap wished that producers had also killed off Izzy and Ben "while they were at it".
