= Kate Baines =

English actress

- Born: 18 July 1978 (age 47); Doncaster, England
- Education: Bretton Hall College (BA)
- Occupation: actress
- Years active: 1995–present
- Known for: television soap operas, stage plays
- Notable work: Hollyoaks, Coronation Street, Emmerdale, Doctors; At Home with the Braithwaites, Peak Practice, City Central

Kate Baines (born 18 July 1978) is an English actress, born in Doncaster. She has appeared in the Channel 4 British soap opera's Hollyoaks (as Beth Morgan #2), Coronation Street and Emmerdale (as Joanne). Kate has also appeared in dramas including At Home with the Braithwaites, Peak Practice and City Central. In June 2020, she appeared in an episode of the BBC soap opera Doctors as Claire Mortimer.

Baines trained at Bretton Hall College and gained a BA (Hons) in Performing Arts (1996–1999). She has also appeared in many stage plays and regularly performs for the Hull Truck Theatre Company.
