= Mikyla Dodd =

English actress

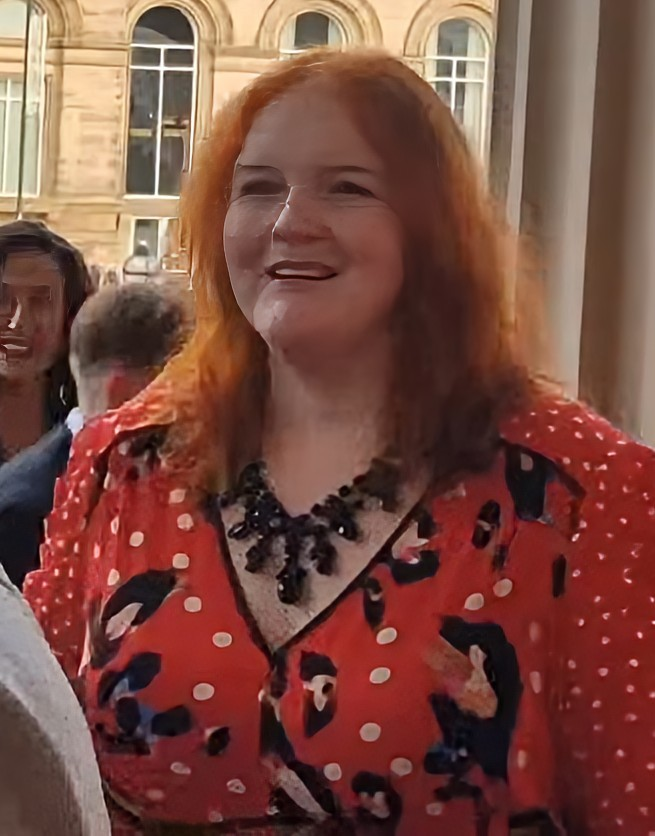
- Dodd in 2025
- Occupation: Actress
- Years active: 2000–
- Television: Hollyoaks

Mikyla Dodd (born 1978) is an English actress and writer, who is most known for playing the role of Chloe Bruce in the Channel 4 soap opera Hollyoaks from 2000 until 2004. She is also an activist, raising awareness about eating disorders.

== Early life ==
Dodd was born in 1978 in Blackburn in Lancashire, and attended Billinge High School.

== Television career ==
Dodd played the character Chloe Bruce in the Channel 4 soap opera Hollyoaks from 2000 until 2004. She also performed in Hollyoaks: Breaking Boundaries, the show's first late night edition, in 2000 and in Hollyoaks: Indecent Behaviour in 2001. She was the first plus-size cast member to appear on the show.

In 2006, she appeared in the ITV Reality TV show Celebrity Fit Club.

== Memoir and activism ==
On 28 June 2007, Dodd's memoir The Fat Girl from Hollyoaks, a record of her weight problems as a teenager and life as an actress in a British television soap opera, was published by Hodder & Stoughton. The paperback version was released under the title Playing the Fat Girl.

In 2009, Dodd explored the dangers of diet pills and extreme diets in the BBC Three documentary When Diets Go Wrong.

In 2024, Dodd featured in the documentary A Day With An Eating Disorder, produced by Lynn Crilly, to raise awareness of eating disorders. During Eating Disorders Awareness Week in 2025, she said that:

“I’ve got a very challenging relationship with food. It dominates my thoughts most of my waking hours and somebody in my family close to me, also has struggled with anorexia nervosa. It doesn’t leave people either, it’s a difficult one. Getting people when they’re younger and seeing the difference makes that really improves the trajectory to a normal, healthy life and experience with food. Anything that raises awareness and helps people realise they’re not alone is a big deal to me, which is why I said yes to taking part straight away. Nobody knows what’s going on behind somebody’s eyes and just appreciating that we’re all having our own struggles in our own way is important. What we need is a little bit more humility and a little bit more positivity towards each other.”

She has also spoken about body image and the media industry on radio broadcasts.
