= Elize du Toit =

British actress (born 1980)

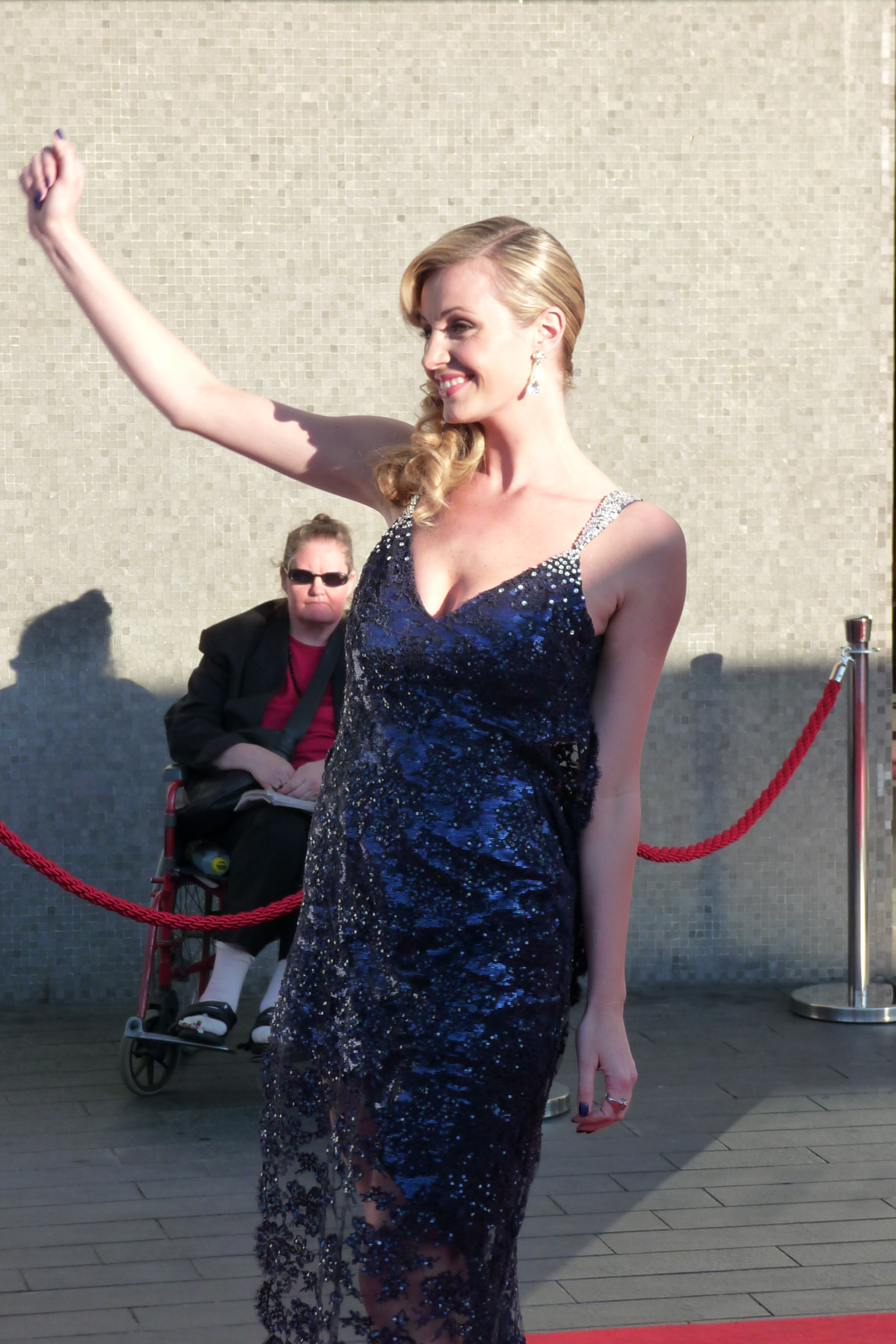
- du Toit in 2009
- Born: 21 February 1980 (age 46); Grahamstown, Cape Province, South Africa
- Education: University of Edinburgh
- Occupations: Film, television actress
- Years active: 2000–2012
- Spouse: Rafe Spall (m. 2010; div. 2021)
- Children: 3

Elize du Toit (/ɛˈliːz dəˈtɔɪ/ eh-LEEZ də-TOY; born 21 February 1980) is a South African-born English former actress best known for playing the role of Izzy Davies in the Channel 4 soap opera Hollyoaks from 2000 to 2004, with a brief return in 2007.

== Early life ==
Elize du Toit was born in Grahamstown, South Africa, the second of four children, to an artist mother and an orthodontist father. She spent most of her childhood in Pretoria. She moved to Berkshire, United Kingdom, in December 1994, where she attended Wellington College, completed her A-levels; attaining straight As in English, French, history and history of art. She was a member of Reading's Progress Theatre. She studied history at the University of Edinburgh and performed with the Edinburgh University Theatre Company.

== Career ==
Elize du Toit won the role of Izzy Davies in the Channel 4 soap opera Hollyoaks after an open audition, beating 40,000 hopefuls. She left the show in 2004 after four years filming in Liverpool. In November 2011, du Toit made an appearance in Coronation Street as Jenny, the ex-girlfriend of Matt Carter.

== Personal life ==
In 2008, du Toit started dating actor Rafe Spall after the two met in a bar through mutual friends. The couple were married from 2010 to 2021, they lived in West Kensington, London. They have three children together.

== Filmography ==
| Year | Title | Role | Notes |
|---|---|---|---|
| 2000–2004, 2007 | Hollyoaks | Izzy Cornwell | |
| 2005 | Triangle | Bailey Blake | American pilot, not picked up |
| 2006 | The Devil's Chair | Rachel Fowles | |
| 2006 | Dalziel and Pascoe | Abigail Stewart | Series 10, 2 episodes: "Glory Days, Part 1 & 2" |
| 2006 | The Line of Beauty | Sophie Tipper | 1 episode |
| 2007 | Flirting with Flamenco | Karen | Straight-to-DVD |
| 2007 | Doctor Who | Sinister woman | Series 3, 2 episodes |
| 2008 | The Bill | Claire Webster | 1 episode |
| 2008 | Casualty | Nicola Westland | 3 episodes |
| 2009 | Homeland | Sylvie | |
| 2009 | Waterloo Road | Heather | |
| 2009 | Ghost Town | Rachel | |
| 2010 | Material Girl | Katy Travis | 1 episode |
| 2010 | M.I. High | Sydney Barbour | |
| 2011 | Waking the Dead | Bonnie Yorke | 2 episodes |
| 2011 | Lewis | Andrea de Ritter | 1 episode: The Gift of Promise |
| 2011 | Coronation Street | Jenny | 1 episode |
| 2012 | Skyfall | Vanessa | M's Assistant |
