= All About Soap =

British magazine

- All About Soap Issue 1
- Editor: Johnathon Hughes
- Categories: Soap Opera
- Frequency: Fortnightly
- Circulation: 34,678 (June–December 2015)
- Founded: October 1999
- Final issue: 23 December 2016
- Company: Hearst Magazines UK
- Country: United Kingdom
- Language: English
- Website: www.allaboutsoap.co.uk

All About Soap was a fortnightly UK magazine founded in October 1999. It was released on Tuesdays. Storylines of the shows it covered were from soap operas shown in the United Kingdom and from Australia, including EastEnders, Coronation Street, Emmerdale, Doctors, Hollyoaks, Neighbours and Home and Away.

== History and profile ==
The magazine launched in 1999 as a sister magazine to Inside Soap and as a rival to Soaplife which had taken off just months earlier, the same year.

Out of the three leading soap magazines, it is the only one to have featured a celebrity column written by a soap star. Emmerdale's Lucy Pargeter (who plays Chas Dingle), Verity Rushworth (Donna Windsor) and Matthew Bose (Paul Lambert) have all written the celebrity column.

The magazine also launched the All About Soap Bubble Awards.

The magazine had a circulation of 68,487 copies in June 2013. Its circulation was 64,376 copies in February 2014. The magazine's circulation was 34,678 copies in the six months from June to December 2015.

After seventeen years, the magazine ceased publication in December 2016.
