= Daniel Hyde (actor) =

British actor

Daniel Hyde (born 25 September 1975) is a British actor most notable for his roles as Scott Anderson in Hollyoaks and Jason Wilding in Family Affairs.

He graduated from the Webber Douglas Academy of Dramatic Art in 1999 and his other television credits include The Bill, Casualty and London's Burning.
