= List of Hollyoaks characters introduced in 2002 =

The following is a list of characters who first appeared in the Channel 4 soap opera Hollyoaks in 2002, by order of first appearance. Hollyoaks is a long running Channel 4 soap opera in the United Kingdom. This year saw the introduction of the Dean family as an extension to current cast member Steph Dean's family.

== Norman Sankofa ==
Norman Sankofa
- Hollyoaks character
- Portrayed by: Jamie Luke
- Duration: 2002–2004
- First appearance: 2002
- Last appearance: 2004
- Introduced by: Jo Hallows
In-universe information
- Mother: Julie Sankofa
- Brothers: Theo Sankofa
- Sisters: Carrie Sankofa
- Nieces: Judy Sankofa

Norman Sankofa is a fictional character on the Channel 4 British television soap opera Hollyoaks. He was played by actor Jamie Luke between 2002 and 2004.

Norman is Theo Sankofa's younger brother. As a schoolchild, Norman was left homeless after Theo's death, a fact he hid for many months from the other Hollyoaks residents. Jack Osborne eventually befriended Norman and took him into his home, much to the annoyance of Jack's son, Darren, who Norman consequently had many run-ins with. After his A-levels, Norman started a brief relationship with Zara Morgan, only to vanish to train as a policeman, following in Jack's footsteps.

== Charlie Green ==
Charlie Green
- Hollyoaks character
- Portrayed by: Kieran Cannon
- First appearance: 1 January 2002
- Last appearance: 2002
- Introduced by: Jo Hallows
In-universe information
- Father: Alex Bell
- Mother: Anna Green

Charlie Green is the son of Anna Green and Alex Bell. Alex initially thinks he is infertile but Anna becomes pregnant. On New Year's Day Anna gives birth. Alex convinces her to keep Charlie despite her plans to put him up for adoption. Anna has an affair with Max Cunningham and later moves in with him, taking Charlie with her. Alex tries to move to Hong Kong and take Charlie but Anna catches him at the airport and convinces him to give Charlie back. Max and Anna split up and Charlie and Anna move back to Charlie's grandmother's house.

== Ronnie McCann ==
Ronnie McCann
- Hollyoaks character
- Portrayed by: Nick Patrick
- First appearance: 4 February 2002
- Last appearance: 16 July 2002
- Introduced by: Jo Hallows
In-universe information
- Occupation: Gangster

Ronnie McCann, played by Nick Patrick, was a gangster who threatened Les (John Graham Davies) and Dan Hunter (Andy McNair) into repairing and altering his dodgy vehicles. Les and Dan attempted to escape Ronnie to no avail, so they set him up to be arrested by the police. Les and Dan were also arrested but later released, whilst Ronnie was charged. Ronnie began sending threats from prison, which eventually stopped.

== Ellie Mills ==
Ellie Mills (also Hunter) is a fictional character from the long-running Channel 4 soap opera Hollyoaks, played by Sarah Baxendale. She first appeared in 2002 and made her final appearance in 2005.

== Cameron Clark ==
Cameron Clark
- Hollyoaks character
- Portrayed by: Ben Gerrard
- Duration: 2002–2006
- First appearance: Episode 889; 10 October 2002
- Last appearance: Episode 1735; 17 March 2006
- Introduced by: Jo Hallows
In-universe information
- Occupation: Musician

Cameron Clark is a fictional character from Hollyoaks, played by Ben Gerrard. The character made his first on-screen appearance on 10 October 2002. Cameron remained in the show for four years.

Gerrard originally auditioned for the role of Jake Dean but was unsuccessful and was later recalled to play Cameron instead. Cameron was Gerrard's first professional acting role. He remained in the show for four years.

Cameron is characterised as a "polite and affectionate" student. The official Hollyoaks website described the character as being "blessed with a rather dull reputation", he also has depression which became apparent following his completion of school, which culminates in a suicide attempt.

Writers developed a relationship story between Cameron and Lisa Hunter (Gemma Atkinson). Soon after the begin dating, Lisa begins to receive abusive text messages. Atkinson told a reporter from Inside Soap that the abusive messages begin because she is with Cameron and receives abuse calling her a "slag". She explained that "lots of kids at school have been jealous of her and Cameron". Atkinson believed Lisa is most effected by a text questioning whether or not Cameron is aware that she self-harms. In addition, Lisa realises the mystery harasser must be someone close to her. Cameron tries to expose the culprit by telephoning the number and Zara Morgan (Kelly Greenwood) answers. Atkinson said "Cameron immediately assumes it must be Zara, so Lisa confronts her about it." In a plot twist, Zara reveals that the phone belongs to their ex-boyfriend Brian Drake's (Jonathan Le Billon) phone. He reveals that he wanted revenge for Lisa ending their previous relationship. Atkinson hoped that Lisa and Cameron would be able to move on from their ordeal and build a successful relationship.

Cameron makes his first appearance at Hollyoaks Comprehensive as something of a heartthrob; Abby Davies (Helen Noble), Steph Dean (Carley Stenson), and Zara are just a few who instantly fall for Cameron. Lisa is the only one who succeeds in capturing his attention, however. The pair begin to date, but it ends when Lisa becomes obsessed with Kristian Hargreaves. Lisa dumps Cameron for Kristian and labels Cameron as ‘dull’ and soon Cameron has a reputation for being boring.

Cameron goes on to join a band with Lee Hunter (Alex Carter), David "Bombhead" Burke (Lee Otway) and Norman Sankofa (Jamie Luke), called 'The X Factor', which never quite recover after Lee uses explicit lyrics during the performance for a christening at The Dog in The Pond. Cameron's ambition had always been to be a musician, but his parents pressure him to become a doctor, especially after he is offered a place to study medicine at a London university. Deeply confused and depressed, Cameron attempts suicide, but Bombhead and Sam Owen (Louis Tamone) arrive in time to save him. Both his friends and parents understand and support Cameron while he decides to take a music course at Hollyoaks Community College.

At college, he falls for new tenant Bella Manning (Kim Bourelle); the pair get along, but nothing becomes of it, as she had left HCC. By some bizarre turn of circumstance, Cameron catches the eye of Steph. Eventually the pair become an unlikely couple, and Cameron is seemingly happy.

After the few months, however, he begins to act strangely; he avoids his friends, isolates himself from the outside world, and becomes fixated on cleanliness and order. Cameron faces the prospect of losing Steph rather than admitting he needs help. Eventually he goes to a doctor to discover he has obsessive-compulsive disorder, and Steph supports him through his ordeal. As he gets better, Steph arranges for Cameron to join a band, which he is delighted to do—until he learns that it is going to be across Europe. He tells Steph he is prepared to stay, but she knows how much music means to him, and persuades him to join the band. Cameron says his goodbyes to her, and makes his exit away from The Dog in The Pond to Europe in a bid to make it as a musician.

A reporter from the Sunday Mail compared Cameron to the reclusive American businessman Howard Hughes because of his OCD. They added that "his obsession with germs takes over his life." Sam Soap from Inside Soap praised the character for his realism. They stated "I'm gripped by the tale of Cameron Clark slowly sinking under the weight of his parents' expectations and his inability to relate to his friends. And now he's hit rock-bottom with his suicide attempt. Looks like there may be (real) life in Chester after all." Megan, a representative from OCD Action analysed Cameron's OCD story. She assessed that Cameron could be treated with their help but noted Steph's behaviour needed to alter around Cameron. She added that Steph needed to make Cameron "accept less than 100% certainty."

== Kristian Hargreaves ==
Kristian Hargreaves is a fictional character from the British Channel 4 soap opera Hollyoaks, played by Max Brown between 2002 and 2004.

== Craig Dean ==
Craig Dean is a fictional character from the long-running British Channel 4 soap opera Hollyoaks, played by Guy Burnet. Burnet has won many of Britain's most prestigious acting awards for this role. After his eventful departure from the series in September 2007, he returned to the show on 3 September 2008 in a bid to secure his sunset ending with John Paul McQueen, in which he was successful. He was also featured in the new spin-off show Hollyoaks Later in November 2008.

The character has been called one of Hollyoaks' most iconic characters.

== Debbie Dean ==
Debra "Debbie" Dean is a fictional character from the British Channel 4 soap opera Hollyoaks, played by Jodi Albert. She first appeared in 2002, before Albert quit the role in 2004. She made her final appearance during 2005, before making a brief return in 2006.

== Jake Dean ==
Jake Dean is a fictional character from the British Channel 4 soap opera Hollyoaks, played by Kevin Sacre. Sacre portrayed the character between 2002 and 2008, before making a return on 5 October 2009. In March 2010, Sacre was axed from the series by Paul Marquess during his major revamp and cast cull. Jake made his last appearance on 6 August 2010.

== Frankie Osborne ==
Francine "Frankie" Osborne (née Wallace, previously Dean) is a fictional character from the British Channel 4 soap opera Hollyoaks, played by Helen Pearson. She made her first on-screen appearance on 9 October 2002. She is part of the Dean family.

== Johnno Dean ==
John "Johnno" Dean is a fictional character from the long-running Channel 4 British television soap opera Hollyoaks, played originally by Mark Powley. He first appeared in October 2002, and from April 2003 was replaced by Colin Wells until his exit in July 2005.

== Lillian Hunter ==
Lillian Hunter
- Hollyoaks character
- Portrayed by: Judith Barker
- Duration: 2002–2003
- First appearance: 12 December 2002
- Last appearance: 19 December 2003
- Introduced by: Jo Hallows
In-universe information
- Sons: Les Hunter
- Grandsons: Dan Hunter; Lee Hunter
- Granddaughters: Ellie Mills; Lisa Hunter

Lillian Hunter, played by Judith Barker, is the mother of Les Hunter (John Graham Davies). Lillian arrived to stay with the Hunter family in December 2002 and returned in December 2003, when her granddaughter Ellie Mills (Sarah Baxendale) was left in a coma after falling from a roof.
