= Sally Hunter =

- Hollyoaks character
- Portrayed by: Katherine Dow Blyton
- Duration: 2001–2005
- First appearance: 26 July 2001
- Last appearance: 4 November 2005
- Introduced by: Jo Hallows
In-universe information
- Occupation: Teacher
- Husband: Les Hunter
- Sons: Dan Hunter; Lee Hunter
- Daughters: Ellie Mills; Lisa Hunter

Sally Hunter is a fictional character from the British soap opera Hollyoaks, played by Katherine Dow Blyton. The character made her first on-screen appearance on 26 July 2001. Sally is introduced into the series as the matriarch of the Hunter family. She arrives to take charge of her warring family. Writers portrayed a problematic marriage between Sally and Les Hunter (John Graham Davies). Sally contends with Les' alcohol addiction and their son Lee Hunter (Alex Carter) is portrayed constantly trying to solve their issues. One of the character's early stories was coping with the disappearance of her daughter Ellie Mills (Sarah Baxendale). Dow Blyton was written out of Hollyoaks in 2005 and Sally made her final appearance during the episode broadcast on 4 November 2005.

== Development ==
Dow Blyton made her first appearance on 26 July 2001, as Sally arrives in Chester to sort out her "warring" family. Hollyoaks marks Dow Blyton's first major acting role. Sally is characterised as a "strong-willed and caring" female. She has a tumultuous relationship with her husband Les Hunter (John Graham Davies), but they later "sorted out their differences". One of the Hunter family's main stories was coping with the disappearance of their eldest daughter, Ellie Mills (Sarah Baxendale). Ellie went missing in Ibiza but later returns home after two years. Steve Hendry from the Sunday Mail assessed that Ellie's disappearance left Sally "on the verge of a breakdown". Baxendale told Hendry that Ellie does not think about how her disappearance affected her family. She said that Ellie is a "bitch" who thinks she does not have to answer to anyone, including her parents.

Writers featured Sally in a marriage crisis storyline which was developed from Les' alcoholism story. In 2002, their son, Dan (Andrew McNair) loses the license for the family garage business after he gets involved in an illegal MOT racket. Les subsequently begins to drink heavily and effects the Hunter's marriage. Les physically assaults Sally during a drunken altercation. Sally decides to forgive Les and pretends the incident was her own fault. Les gets drunk and hits her again and she decides to throw Les out of the family home.

In 2004, writers revisited the issue of Sally and Les' tempestuous marriage. Their problems have a negative effect on their son, Lee Hunter (Alex Carter). He struggles with the prospect of the Hunters being a broken family. Carter told an Inside Soap writer that Lee decides to intervene in his parents' marriage and convinces Les to make an emotional speech. He explained that "seeing his parents split is the last straw" and to prevent a divorce he convinces his father to act fast. Carter added that it was typical of Les to blunder his speech and further annoy Sally. Carter assessed that it was actually "the final nail in the coffin" for the Hunter marriage. Les' further attempt to convince Sally otherwise is also unsuccessful. Carter explained that Les realises he needs to act to save his marriage and dresses in his old leather biking outfit to woo Sally. This creates hysterical laughter from Sally, who cannot believe Les thinks an old outfit could save their broken marriage. Carter concluded that "I think he'll just have to accept things will never be the same again."

Six months later, Les receives a job offer in Norwich and despite their separation, he asks Sally to move away with him. Les' proposition leaves Sally conflicted so Lee and his friend Bombhead (Lee Otway) intervene to try and reunite them. Carter told an Inside Soap reporter that Lee is "devastated" that his parents marriage could end permanently. Carter revealed that if Sally reunites with Les it will "soften the blow" of him leaving. Lee and Bombhead concoct a plan and set up Sally and Les on a date. When neither of them arrive, Sally and Les realise their son's plan. Carter explained that "after a while they have fun, which hasn't happened for ages. It reminds them of the old days and gets Sally thinking about her feelings." Lee catches Les leaving Sally's bedroom which leaves Lee "delighted" that his plan has resulted in his parents reconciliation. Les is asked to start his new job immediately and he requests that Sally join him. She agrees and hands in her resignation at the school, but Carter noted that "something isn't quite right" with her decision. Sally discusses the issue with Bombhead and she admits to feeling "torn about what to do."

In March 2004, a reporter from the Sunday Mirror revealed that producers at Hollyoaks were planning to write out numerous characters as part of a cast revamp. Dow Blyton was one of the cast members who would not have their contract with Hollyoaks renewed. They described it as the "biggest massacre in soap history". Dow Blyton's departure storyline featured Sally and her husband Les moving to Cyprus, following the death of their son, Dan. Just before they plan to leave, Sally declares she cannot go because she is scared of air travel. Lee tries to hypnotise Sally and cure her phobia but his attempts fail. Les comes up with another form of transport and purchases a motorbike complete with a sidecar. Sally agrees to Les' new plan and they leave Hollyoaks and Lee behind. Sally made her final appearance on 4 November 2005.

== Storylines ==
Sally is the mother of Dan, Ellie, Lisa (Gemma Atkinson) and Lee, as well as the wife of Les. She began working at the local chemist in Hollyoaks, before becoming a secondary school science teacher at Hollyoaks Comprehensive. On her arrival, already Sally had her work cut out in trying to track down her eldest child Ellie who has been missing for nearly two years in Ibiza. Ellie's disappearance brought much grief into the Hunter household as youngest daughter Lisa self harmed herself and Lee was getting in trouble with the police. Things weren't made easier by the fact that Sally's husband, Les, always turned to alcohol when he couldn't cope with his daily troubles. Les's drinking split him and Sally up for a while after he accidentally hit her while drunk but through these difficult times, sally kept a strong head and kept her family together.

Eventually, when Ellie did arrived back home-suddenly things got even worse for the Hunter clan. Ellie's arrival brought more misery as she would often go against her mother's wishes. Ellie married Toby Mills (Henry Luxemburg), which the Hunter family approved off, but it was to be a huge mistake. After Ellie went missing again, Dan and Toby went to track her down but instead it was to be a horrendous night for the Hunter family. Toby had died and Dan was accused of his murder, while Ellie was left unconscious. Dan protested his innocence as he accused Toby of being the local serial killer and the Hunter family had to wait for Ellie to regain her consciousness, to clear Dan's name. When Ellie eventually woke up, she had lost her memory and accused Dan of killing her husband. This led to a long battle between the Hunter family and Ellie, climaxing to Ellie testifying against Dan in court. It led Dan to being sentenced for 15 years which left Sally devastated.

However, within time Ellie managed to get her memory back and retracted her statement, claiming Dan's innocence after all. A delighted Sally was hugely relieved when Dan was finally released, but she vowed to never forgive Ellie who moved away from Hollyoaks after Sally disowned her. For once things seemed to be getting better for Sally, but it wasn't to last for too long as son Dan died in a rally race. With so many bad memories in the village, Sally decided the best was to move away from Hollyoaks and begin a new fresh life away with husband Les. The pair bid farewell on Les's motorbike to start a new life in Cyprus.

== Reception ==
A reporter for the Daily Record branded the character a "kindly matriarch". Lucy Lather from Inside Soap opined that "Mrs Hunter in Hollyoaks finally seeing the light and refusing to live with her evil daughter - better late than never!". Lather included it as one of her soap stories she approved of titled "Yeahs!".
