= Ellie Mills =

- Hollyoaks character
- Portrayed by: Sarah Baxendale
- Duration: 2002–2005
- First appearance: 15 February 2002
- Last appearance: 25 March 2005
- Introduced by: Jo Hallows
- Spin-off appearances: Hollyoaks: Leap of Faith
In-universe information
- Occupation: Barmaid
- Father: Les Hunter
- Mother: Sally Hunter
- Brothers: Dan Hunter; Lee Hunter
- Sisters: Lisa Hunter
- Husband: Toby Mills (2003)

Ellie Mills (also Hunter) is a fictional character from the British soap opera Hollyoaks, played by Sarah Baxendale. The character made her first on-screen appearance on 15 February 2002. Ellie is part of the show's Hunter family. She had been referenced on-screen numerous times as her family were searching for her after she goes missing in Ibiza. She later arrives in Chester which shocks her family. Ellie is characterised as a confident and independent female but has selfish tendencies. Ellie's stories have revolved around her relationships, especially with Toby Mills (Henry Luxemburg), who she later marries. Writers portrayed Toby as a serial killer who goes on a prolonged murder spree in the community. Writers embroiled Ellie into his crimes and she chooses not to report him to the police. Ellie later fears for her safety and flees to Liverpool. The scenes formed part of a late-night spin-off episode titled Hollyoaks: Leap of Faith, which featured Toby's death. Ellie was featured in one of the show's biggest stunts when she and Toby fall from a one-hundred foot building. Ellie survives and later allows her brother, Dan Hunter (Andrew McNair) to take the blame for the murders. Ellie's lies are soon discovered and she is arrested and put on trial for covering up Toby's murders.

Baxendale left Hollyoaks in 2005. She made her final appearance as Ellie during the episode broadcast on 25 March 2005. For her portrayal of Ellie, Baxendale was nominated for "Best Bitch" at the 2004 Inside Soap Awards and Ellie and Toby's rooftop fall was nominated for a Spectacular Scene of the Year accolade at the 2004 British Soap Awards. Ellie has been reviewed as a selfish character by television critics, with others branding her as high maintenance and fiercely independent.

== Casting ==
Ellie is Sarah Baxendale's first regular television role after graduating from drama school. Of her casting, Baxendale stated she was "thrilled" to appear in Hollyoaks, adding "it's a big step for me". Baxendale made her first on-screen appearance as Ellie during the episode broadcast on 15 February 2002. Her first scenes feature her breaking into the Hunter family home and looking through her old family photograph albums. She told Steve Hendry from the Sunday Mail that "coming into it is exciting. I'm working with people I've been watching for a long time, but they have made me welcome."

== Development ==
=== Characterisation and introduction ===
On the show's official website, Ellie is described as a "gregarious, determined and independent" female. Prior to Ellie's introduction into the series, she played a significant part of the Hunter families stories. Ellie had been missing in Ibiza for some time and unexpectedly arrives in Chester. Ellie's disappearance caused the Hunter family a great deal of emotional distress. Ellie fails to understand their predicament. Baxendale told the Sunday Mail's Hendry that her character "is a bit of a bitch". Not having to answer to anyone for two years has made her this way. She had been able to do whatever she wanted and make her own decisions. She added that Ellie does not think she needs to watch her behaviour to please others or think about anyone other than herself. Baxendale assessed that Ellie "doesn't try to be a bitch, but she does end up being that way. She's not malicious, but she is quite harsh to people. Ellie is very confident, selfish without trying to be and holds her emotions back from her family because she doesn't know how to deal with them." Baxendale enjoyed playing Ellie because she was completely different to her. She branded Ellie a "really meaty character rather than a weak victim-type – she is all about going for it."

She told Alison James from Soaplife that Ellie ran away because she was fed up with looking after her siblings. Ellie enjoyed working in bars and clubbing during her time away. Baxendale revealed that "she's been having a good time and reckons she deserved it." Ellie returns because she started missing her family and wants to reconnect with them. Though she has ulterior motives because she is "bored, tired and skint". She added that Ellie chose to cease contact with her family so they were unable to convince her to return home. Baxendale added that Ellie does not realise the trouble she has caused her family until she returns and "the guilt kicks in". Ellie's family have different reactions to her arrival in Hollyoaks. Ellie's younger sister Lisa Hunter (Gemma Atkinson) is delighted by her return. Atkinson told Francesca Babb from All About Soap that "Lisa couldn't be more pleased to see her." She added that everyone is "really surprised" and she finds it difficult to believe she is back because her family did not expect to see her again.

Ellie's brother Dan Hunter (Andrew McNair) is angry at her. Dan believes their family are being too kind towards Ellie. Atkinson added that "she put the family through hell and now they are all treading on eggshells around her. Dan thinks they at least deserve an explanation as to the reasons why she disappeared." Lisa cannot understand Dan's frustrations and warns that his behaviour could cause Ellie to run away again. Ellie soon makes it clear that she is staying and bonds with Lisa. Atkinson described Ellie as "very confident" and Lisa "loves" her attitude. She added that Ellie is also a "very bolshy and bitchy" which her family choose ignore to please her. Ellie soon starts behaving in a "quite arrogant" and "flippant" way and Atkinson concluded that "the Hunters are too scared to say anything to her". Ellie's mother Sally Hunter (Katherine Dow-Blyton) is also angry with Ellie. Baxendale explained that "once the initial euphoria has worn off", Sally cannot cope with her return. Sally tries to convince Ellie to explain where she has been but she refuses. This leaves Sally feeling "awkward" around Ellie, but the actress believed Ellie's treatment of Sally comes from her own guilt about having a good time in Ibiza while her family were "going through hell".

=== Early relationships ===
Writers created a relationship between Ellie and Ben Davies (Marcus Patric). The two characters were used to break a world record of the longest kiss featured in film, set by the Guinness Book of Records. The two characters kissed for a total of 3 minutes and 15 seconds. It broke the record previously set in 1941, from the comedy film You're in the Army Now. To achieve the record the characters take part in an event on National Kissing Day, hosted at their local nightclub The Loft. The episode was broadcast on 2 July 2002. Baxendale described filming the scenes during an interview with Emma Johnson from the Liverpool Echo. She recalled "I think we did it in about five takes but not every kiss went on for the full three minutes! I had kissed Marcus before, because our characters have been a couple for a few weeks now, but I cleaned my teeth about 50 million times." In another interview with Allison Maund from Inside Soap, Baxendale revealed she nearly ruined the kiss by laughing. Hollyoaks held the title until 2013.

Writers soon showcased Ellie's bitchy persona when she makes more drama for her ex-boyfriend Toby Mills (Henry Luxemburg). When he begins a relationship with Mandy Richardson (Sarah Jayne Dunn), she decides to interfere. Toby finds Mandy overbearing and he finds it difficult to have a serious relationship after the drama Ellie caused him. Luxemburg told All About Soap's Babb that Toby has a "light-hearted" relationship with Mandy after "all the troubles" Ellie caused for him. He is "wary" of getting into a long-term relationship because Ellie made it "so complicated". Mandy fails to notice Toby's reluctance and Ellie takes delight in mocking the couple. Luxemburg explained that "Ellie has been teasing him for being under the thumb which isn't helping things. She has a way of getting at Toby, she knows exactly what to say to wind him up and when she makes comments about Mandy, it really annoys him."

Toby tries to show Ellie that he and Mandy are casual and invites her and Ben around for dinner. He plans a takeaway but Mandy changes their plans and gets out her best silverware. Toby is embarrassed and thinks it will provide Ellie with more reason to mock him. Toby misinterprets a conversation between himself and Mandy and incorrectly believes that she wants to end their relationship. He attends a party the following day, only to discover Mandy still believes they are together. Ellie notices his predicament and decides to publicly humiliate the pair. Ellie has "no qualms" about announcing that Toby does not want to be with Mandy in front of her friends. Luxemburg concluded that "Toby is furious at Ellie for shooting her mouth off. And he's absolutely gutted she had to find out this way."

Writers later used Ellie to begin a feud between her brother Dan and Jake Dean (Kevin Sacre). Ellie develops an attraction to Jake but soon Dan interferes. Sacre told an Inside Soap journalist that "Ellie takes a shine to Jake" but Dan witnesses Jake spending time with Debbie Dean (Jodi Albert) but does not realise they are siblings. Sacre added that Dan presumes Jake is flirting with both Ellie and Debbie, "so he goes for him" and attacks Jake.

Writers made Ellie unpopular with other characters via her friendship with a known rapist, Scott Anderson (Daniel Hyde). Ellie works as a barmaid in the local nightclub, The Loft. When it faces closure, Scott decides to buy the club and keeps Ellie on as his staff. Ellie is thankful that Scott saves the club and her job but other characters are appalled with her behaviour. Baxendale told Sarah Ellis from Inside Soap that Ellie is shocked about Scott being her boss but relieved the club will not shut down. She added that Ellie is determined not to move back home with her family and wants to remain in work and begins to scheme to secure her future. Other characters target Scott and refuse to let him forget his crimes of sexual assault. Scott rethinks his decision and informs Ellie that he may sell the club because of the abuse he receives. Baxendale revealed Ellie "panic" and begins to flirt with Scott to make him believe he has an ally.

Ellie's friend Izzy Davies (Elize du Toit) takes issue with Ellie's behaviour because Scott had previously attacked her. Baxendale added "Izzy is especially upset because they're close friends and she's worried bad things will happen to Ellie." Toby is also upset with Ellie and Baxendale revealed their "brother and sister type relationship" plays into the story. Toby becomes "overprotective" of Ellie but her "headstrong" characterisation allows Ellie to remain undeterred about befriending a rapist. Baxendale concluded that Ellie knows her friends are right about Scott. As the story continues it explores a "power struggle" between Ellie and Scott which worried the actress, because Ellie would endanger herself getting into trouble with Scott. Baxendale was happy with the story because she believed Ellie had gone through a "quiet period" prior to her involvement with Scott.

=== Serial killer ===
Writers included Ellie at the centre of one of their most prolific storylines when she discovers that she is married to a serial killer. His crimes eventually include the attempted murder of Steph Dean (Carley Stenson) and murdering his mother Linda Mills (Wendy Roe). Writers reunited Ellie and Toby for a relationship storyline. Ellie is initially unaware of Toby's crimes. Writers introduced Ellie into the storyline when the killer's identity had not been disclosed to viewers. Ellie takes a car ride into town when a man requests a list to the hospital. Ellie is hesitant to help given there is an active serial killer in her community. The man claims to need medical assistance for his diabetes. Ellie agrees to help because of her brother Dan, who also has diabetes. Baxendale told Andy Baker from Inside Soap that Ellie suspects the man has other intentions when he requests they somewhere quiet. Ellie realises she needs to remove herself from the situation and plots and escape. Baxendale believed Ellie feels "panic" and is "forceful" with the man because "she's absolutely desperate to get away". The story provided writers with a chance to showcase a different and more vulnerable side to Ellie's usual feisty persona. Baxendale enjoyed the opportunity to make the character more versatile. She believed Ellie had just been involved in "man-eating stories" and now she got to play Ellie's "sensitive side".

The introduction of Toby's mother proves to be divisive for Ellie. She struggles to compete with the other woman in Toby's life. Baxendale told Kathryn Secretan from Soaplife that Linda "desperately tries to let it be seen that she has good relationship wit her son". Baxendale revealed that Toby would not entertain Linda, were she not his mother. At this point in the story, Toby has already begun his murderous crime spree and writers portrayed Ellie as oblivious to his behaviour. Writers included ironic details in the story, such as when Ellie secures a job as a promotions girl in which Ellie is required to dress in a spanner outfit to promote a hardware store. The irony is divulged from the fact Toby had been portrayed using a spanner to murder his female victims. Ellie's behaviour puts her in danger, though Baxendale believed Ellie was safe because Toby genuinely loves Ellie. He initially reacts angrily and Baxendale stated it was the first time Ellie becomes "actually quite scared" of Toby. But Toby quickly moves past the scenario and is inspired to ask Ellie to marry him. Ellie is quick to accept his marriage proposal. Baxendale believed Ellie's quick acceptance spurred from their shared history. She explained that "she and Toby go a way back a long way. They were together in Ibiza and, out of all the people in their lives, she and Toby are soul-mates. Despite all the things she's done, I think Ellie's always imagined being with Toby for the rest of her life."

Writers soon portrayed Toby's murderous behaviour as becoming heightened from his interactions with Ellie. Her behaviour gives Toby murderous urges that reconnects negative feelings he felt during his upbringing with Linda. Baxendale stated that Ellie and Linda do not get along, which only spurs on Toby's murderous urges. Luxemburg told a reporter from Inside Soap that Toby decides to side with Ellie and prevent his mother from moving in with them. She threatens to leave Toby but he makes the "tough decision" to stick by Ellie. He added that "Linda and Ellie a catty from the moment they meet" and Linda believes "Ellie is trying to take her son away."

Toby begins to struggle with guilt and Ellie presumes he is grieving over his mother's death. He agrees to go to counselling but has to conceal the truth. Toby asks Ellie to move away with him, believing it will resolve his guilt. Ellie refuses to leave and Toby leaves alone. He soon returns and confesses that he is a serial killer. Luxemburg told Dorothy Koomson from All About Soap that his character can no longer lie to Ellie. He tells Ellie about Steph and Linda, but she refuses to believe him. Luxemburg explained that "at first Ellie doesn't believe a word of what Toby says, but he keeps repeating it until she does." He added that Ellie makes excuses for Toby and "justifies" his behaviour claiming that his mother's death was accidental and Steph must have provoked him. Luxemburg believed that Toby was "selfish" for telling Ellie the truth. He knows that to have a future with Ellie, they need honesty. Toby thinks that he and Ellie are "stronger than ever" but the burden of his crimes "is really doing Ellie's head in". He concluded that Toby is "deluded if he thinks he can get away with what he's done, especially now he's confessed."

In another interview, Baxendale told Alison James from Soaplife that Ellie is "losing her mind" and "not thinking rationally". Ellie loves Toby, "adores him almost to the point of obsession." Ellie is determined to convince Toby to keep Steph's attack a secret to preserve their own relationship. She convinces herself that Toby is grieving his mother's death and is lying about Steph's attack. Soon Ellie begins to realise that Toby is actually the serial killer when she notices differences between Steph's attack and other murder victims. Ellie learns that another woman has been murdered. She checks her diary and realises that Toby was missing at the time of the murder and knows he is responsible. She soon regrets protecting Toby and finds herself in a worse predicament now she is lying for a murderer. Ellie knows that if Toby commits more murders she could be charged as an accessory to his crimes. Baxendale explained that her character is "just too freaked out" to consider what will happen next. She told an All About Soap reporter that Ellie is in denial and "really under pressure" by the "awful" situation. She added that Ellie reaches a point where she has to admit she is living with a murderer. Ellie also worries when Toby is alone with her sister, Lisa. Baxendale reasoned that Ellie cannot hide her relief that Toby has not harmed Lisa. Toby is "upset" by her reaction and flees the scene, leaving her wondering how he will retaliate, adding "Ellie is scared he'll kill again."

Ellie decides to stay with Toby but Dan notices something is wrong with the couple and blames Ellie. McNair told Alison James from Soaplife that Dan has never forgiven Ellie for running away to Ibiza. He believes that she is the cause of her and Toby's problems and even accuses her of having an affair with Scott. Dan discovers that Ellie has been drugging Toby, unaware she is trying to keep herself safe. McNair explained "Dan knows there's something not right going on and he blames Ellie for it. He knows what a bitch she can be and doesn't trust her." When Toby murders another woman, he is left with bruises from the fatal struggle. Dan notices the bruises and accuses Ellie of domestic violence towards Toby. He tells Dan that he and Ellie are happy and trying to start a family together. He puts Ellie's life in danger by revealing that she is taking contraception pills to prevent any pregnancy from occurring. McNair defended his character, stating "thinking that Ellie's being selfish as always, Dan tells Toby the truth."

Ellie escapes and flees to Liverpool. Toby locks Lisa in his flat and tracks Ellie down. When Dan finds Lisa, they too travel to Liverpool to save Ellie. Producers planned the location filming to coincide with their special late night episode of Hollyoaks. The episode features a dramatic stunt and the demise of Toby. McNair told James that "it's hardly a happy ending for all three" and that his character becomes embroiled in Ellie and Toby's storyline. He added that Dan's "fate is tied up with her. Those Liverpool scenes were exhausting to do but really exciting at the same time." Luxemburg revealed that Toby becomes fixated on the idea of fate keeping him and Ellie together. He explained that "as far as he's concerned, fate says Ellie and Toby should be together forever and he can't see fate letting him down."

After Toby's death in the stunt episodes, Dan is arrested for his murder. Ellie blames Dan for his death and allows him to remain a suspect in the serial killer case. Writers portrayed Ellie at odds with her brother and he reluctance to accept she was married to a murderer. Baxendale told Suzanne Ostler from Soaplife that Ellie wants to preserve the memory of her marriage to Toby prior to discovering his murderous crimes. Dan asks local police officer Will Davies (Barny Clevely) to help clear his name. Will asks Ellie further questions about the murders but Ellie just avoids his questions. Baxendale explained that Ellie is "scared" and angrily turns on the remainder of the Hunter family, telling them they mean nothing to her. At this point in the story, "the strain's beginning to show and she regrets saying it afterwards." Baxendale sympathised with her character because Ellie has "proved herself to be more naïve than she thought". Though, she would have never made the same choices as Ellie. She believed that Dan deserved viewers' sympathy more than Ellie. She believed that her character could only have a future in the show if she decided to "face up to the truth about her past".

Writers continued the story into July 2004 and created a court case plot for Ellie. She is sent to trial to determine whether she is innocent of guilty of being complicit in Toby's crimes and perverting the course of justice. Baxendale told Kate Woodward from Inside Soap that Ellie hopes she will be found guilty. Ellie believes it will create "a clean slate" and been "punished properly". The actress defended Ellie and thought she did not deserve to be convicted because "everything she's been through has been a lesson in itself." Sally and Lisa refuse to forgive Ellie for allowing Dan to be convicted of murder. Les decides to accompany Ellie to court but Baxendale revealed Ellie "resigned herself to accepting" her family would not support her. She thinks they are being "particularly harsh" and expected "more sympathy" for her own ordeal, but realises what she put her family through. Baxendale revealed that Ellie pleading guilty upsets Les more. Ellie "just stands there and takes it, she takes whatever is thrown at her." Ellie's only hope of escaping a conviction is the jury being unable to decide whether her memory loss after her coma was genuine. Baxendale hoped the conclusion of the storyline would change Ellie's characterisation.

=== Steph Dean's hate campaign ===
When the truth about Toby is revealed, Ellie tries to make amends with fellow characters. She apologises to Steph for Toby's brutal attack against her. Steph accepts her apology and the pair become close friends. Writers played Steph behaving manipulatively as she fools Ellie into believing their friendship is genuine. Steph begins to a hate campaign against Ellie, sending threatening messages and delivering a dead pigeon to her. Ellie does not suspect Steph and accepts comfort from her tormentor. Stenson told an Inside Soap reporter that Steph wants to destroy Ellie's life. She added that "she wants Ellie to be as scared, upset and hurt as she was after the attack, and to basically make her life a living hell. She's not going to stop until she breaks Ellie completely." Steph is angry when Ellie receives money from Toby's mother's will. She believes she herself deserved the compensation and heightens her hate campaign. Steph makes Ellie think her father has been involved in a fatal accident and then puts Ellie and Toby's wedding photos on display in the local park.

== Storylines ==
The eldest Hunter child was a runaway living in Ibiza for two years without contacting her family before returning, not out of love, but rather because she had run out of money. She was a man-eater and was responsible for the spread of an STD that Jamie Nash (Stefan Booth) got the blame for. She often caused trouble for her family and often went against her mother's wishes. When she arrived on town, she discovered that her brother Lee Hunter (Alex Carter) was always getting in trouble with the police and school, and failed exams, and Lisa self-harmed after she was bullied by Steph, while Dan was depressed because she ran away from home.

She married Toby, who her family approved of, but this was a huge mistake, as he was in fact a serial killer. Ellie ran off again, and Toby and Dan went off to look for her, but the night ended in disaster when Toby died, Ellie was left unconscious after falling from a roof and Dan was in the frame for his murder. The Hunter clan desperately awaited for Ellie to wake up to clear Dan's name, but on waking, she had lost her memory and accused Dan of murdering her husband.

Her family turned against her, including her father, and Ellie also incurred the wrath of Johnno Dean (Colin Wells) and his wife Frankie Osborne (Helen Pearson), whose daughters Steph and Debbie had their lives ruined by Toby, Steph nearly lost her life after being attacked by Toby and was left with epilepsy as a result of the attack; and Debbie, who had been in a relationship with Dan, having lost her boyfriend due to his wrongful imprisonment. Ellie's actions led to an explosive confrontation with Johnno, and her father Les Hunter (John Graham Davies) had to step in and prevent his business partner from physically attacking Ellie. The atmosphere in the Hunter household was too much and her mother Sally disowned her. Ellie's memory eventually returned and Dan was cleared, but her mother was unable to forgive her.

Dan refused to forgive her, and after he died, Sally made it clear that she was no longer a part of the family and said she wished that Ellie had died instead of Dan. Ellie continued to live with the family, but tensions flared up yet again when she needed tuition money and asked Sally if she could get back some of the money she'd given to help Dan start the Pit Stop. An angry Sally gave her a cheque for all the money, further alienating Ellie from her mother and siblings. Les had moved away due to Dan's death and the family strife and Sally decided to look for him. When Lee and Lisa decided to go and find their parents, Ellie wanted to go along, but they refused, telling her once and for all that she didn't fit in. While they were all gone, Ellie had a drink with Russ Owen (Stuart Manning) and Dannii Carbone (Christina Baily) and realised she had nothing left in Chester. She packed her bags and watched a few old family videos from when she and Dan were kids. Full of remorse, she left a goodbye letter and the ripped-up cheque from Sally. After taking one last look around the family home, she left.

When the Hunters returned to find her missing, they initially rowed over who was responsible for her leaving and whether she just wanted to hurt them yet again. Bombhead (Lee Otway) convinced them she was just trying to do what she thought they wanted and that they should be happy. They sent Ellie an e-mail, telling her they loved her and do care for her and to contact them any time she wanted. Sally later told her husband and her children that Ellie is now living in France, finishing her schooling and having found work.

== Reception ==
For her portrayal of Ellie, Baxendale was nominated for "Best Bitch" at the 2004 Inside Soap Awards. At the 2004 British Soap Awards, Ellie and Toby's rooftop fall was nominated for Spectacular Scene of the Year accolade. A writer from Soaplife included Ellie in their list of 10 most hated soap characters. They wrote "Ellie was always a selfish cow and marriage to a serial killer didn't improve her. Now Toby's dead and she's letting her own brother take the rap for a murder he didn't commit, fans who did have time for her have lost all sympathy as she refuses to get Dan off the hook." They also compiled a list of "top 10 soap baddies" who it was "best not to mess with". They included Ellie at number eight and wrote "you'd feel sympathy for any woman who married a serial killer, but Ellie's lost any claim to sympathy", concluding that Ellie was "plain evil" for her treatment of Dan.

Kathryn Secretan from Soaplife was critical of Ellie, stating "she may come across as feisty and fiercely independent, but Ellie Hunter has in reality always been pretty happy to flirt with anyone who'd pay her attention." Secretan found it "rather amazing" that Ellie managed to remain committed to Toby, considering her behaviour in previous episodes. Another Soaplife writer scathed "high maintenance is certainly one term that springs to mind to describe Ellie Hunter. After all, she has a selfish streak wider than her ego and is furiously independent. In fact you'd pity any fella who falls for her." Andy Baker from Inside Soap branded Ellie a "tough blonde" and a "feisty club barmaid". He thought it was "uncharacteristic" of Ellie to show kindness. Another reporter from the magazine praised the serial killer storyline. They assessed it was "the perfect way to remove the endless stream of golden-topped clones in the show." They suggested murdering Ellie because she is "self-absorbed" would be ideal. Another Inside Soap critic chose Ellie's court case in their "must see moments" feature and also branded her a "pesky minx" with a "myriad of misdemeanours" and hoped she would be sent to prison for her behaviour. A writer from WhatsOnStage.com called Ellie a "bad girl character".
