= Toby Mills =

Fictional character from the soap opera, Hollyoaks

- Hollyoaks character
- Portrayed by: Henry Luxemburg
- Duration: 2001–2003
- First appearance: 25 October 2001
- Last appearance: 5 November 2003
- Introduced by: Jo Hallows
- Spin-off appearances: Hollyoaks: Leap of Faith
In-universe information
- Occupation: Student; Barman; Mechanic
- Mother: Linda Mills
- Wife: Ellie Mills (2003)

Toby Mills is a fictional character from the British soap opera Hollyoaks, played by Henry Luxemburg. The character debuted on-screen during the episode broadcast on 25 October 2001. Toby is introduced into the series as a university student and a pub barman. He was originally characterised as a risk-taker and a loyal friend. Producers decided to transform Toby into the show's first serial killer. His murder spree plays largely into his characterisation as writers displayed his anger issues and relationship issues.

The show's production developed the serial killer plot as a mystery storyline. The killer's identity was originally concealed and Toby's true identity remained unknown to viewers. He was revealed as the killer in the show's 1000th episode and it formed the milestones main storyline. Writers focused largely on Toby's relationship with Ellie Mills (Sarah Baxendale). He continues to murder blonde haired women in secret until Ellie eventually discovers the truth. Toby later tries to kill Steph Dean (Carley Stenson) but she survives, creating the potential for Toby's crimes to be exposed. Ellie discovers Toby's murders but chooses to ignore this.

Luxemburg left the series and his departure was played out in a spin-off show titled Hollyoaks: Leap of Faith. It focused on Toby's comeuppance and death. It features a series of stunts which were performed by body doubles. Toby is run over by a car and later falls from a one-hundred foot building to his death. He made his final appearance as Toby during the episode broadcast on 5 November 2003. After his departure, Luxemburg revealed that he had never been worried about being typecast as a television serial killer. Luxemburg and Toby's stories have been nominated for two Inside Soap Awards and three British Soap Awards. Television critics have branded him the show's most prolific killer and praised his storylines.

== Casting ==
Luxemburg auditioned and secured the role of Toby six months after he had graduated from drama school. In an interview with Steve Pratt from The Northern Echo, he reminisced about his "relief" felt when putting his skill set learned at drama school to use. Luxemburg recalled that he learned a lot when he assumed the role, adding "everything I was taught was falling into place."

== Development ==
=== Characterisation and introduction ===
Toby is introduced into the series as a university student at the Hollyoaks Community College studying Cultural Studies. He also takes part-time employment as a barman at the Dog in the Pond pub. On the show's official website, Toby is described as being "not scared to take a risk, but a loyal friend." Toby's development into a serial killer played largely into his characterisation. Luxemburg was never worried about being typecast as a fictional serial killer because of the younger demographic Hollyoaks was created for. He revealed that many in the industry did not automatically associate him with the role.

In 2001, Writers created Toby's first relationship storyline with Mandy Richardson (Sarah Jayne Dunn). They portrayed Toby as unwilling to commit to a long term future with Mandy. Luxemburg told an Inside Soap reporter that "Mandy and Toby started off really well together, but since Mandy moved into her flat it's all got a bit too domesticated for Toby. Settling down scares him." Toby tries to tell Mandy their relationship is over but she fails to realise this. His friend, Ben Davies (Marcus Patric) is confused that Mandy was okay with the break-up. Toby later attends a party and Mandy is convinced they are still together. Luxemburg explained that Mandy kisses Toby and Toby's ex-girlfriend, Ellie Mills (Sarah Baxendale) informs Mandy that Toby has broken up with her. Ellie and Mandy have a fight and Mandy is left humiliated by Toby and Ellie's actions. Luxemburg believed Toby would never reconcile with Mandy. He added "it was all just about sex and fun" and "he was never into Mandy that much."

=== Serial killer story ===
The serial killer storyline was originally developed with the culprit's identity concealed from viewers. Writers revealed the killer during a week long strand of special episodes to celebrate the 1000th episode of Hollyoaks. The storyline had been planned and developed for eighteen months. The show's executive producer Jo Hallows wanted to create new stories which pushed the boundaries of the soap opera genre. Hallows told an Inside Soap reporter that she chose to keep the serial killer's identity a secret to "create maximum surprise" during the show's 1000th episode. She added that the murders would continue and occur in the village itself. Hallows created an atmosphere on the show where all characters live in fear of becoming the killers next victim. The episode concerning Toby's reveal as the show's serial killer features his fourth murder. Advance promotional photographs confirmed that the victim would be Roxy Maguire (Harriet Green).

The plot coincides with the show's reality television storyline, a show called The Fish Tank featuring characters living together in front of cameras. The events in the Fish Tank inadvertently cause the fourth murder to occur. Hallows did not mention Toby in her prior discussions about the killer's identity. She noted that other characters come under suspicion such as Bombhead (Lee Otway), Scott Anderson (Daniel Hyde) and Dan Hunter (Andrew McNair). Hallows added "there are several people with motives, so practically everyone is in the frame." Writers introduced the character Dale Jackson (Laila Rouass), a detective inspector who becomes determined to find the serial killer. Dale begins to interrogate other characters, but mistakenly concentrates on her theories on Bombhead. Rouass believed that Dale was better suited to the investigation because she did not know the other characters in the show personally.

After Toby was unveiled as the serial killer, they portrayed his girlfriend Ellie as unaware of his crimes. Ellie's behaviour often contributes to Toby's paranoia and subsequent killings. Baxendale told Kathryn Secretan from Soaplife that Ellie undeserving to receive the blame for Toby's murderous behaviour. She added that Ellie "has absolutely no idea" about Toby's true identity. She explained that Ellie is aware that Toby is a "paranoid person" and knows he has an "angry side" but she could never fathom him being a serial killer. Baxendale believed a "pivotal point" in Toby's storyline is when Ellie secures work as a promotions girl and he becomes angry with her. She added "she gets really upset at Toby's reaction to her new job and she's actually quite scared because he's so angry." Baxendale believed that Toby would never harm Ellie because he is "so madly in love with her". Writers played irony into the scenes in which Ellie takes a job promoting a hardware store because Toby's choice of murder weapon is always a spanner. They portrayed Toby as being relaxed with Ellie wearing a spanner costume in the promotion because it is not something revealing such as a bikini.

Writers developed a marriage storyline between the two characters. Following Ellie's stint as a promotions girl, Toby wants to have more commitment between them. Toby proposes marriage and Ellie instantly accepts. Baxendale described a long backstory between Toby and Ellie which began when they lived in Ibiza. She told Secretan that "she and Toby are soul-mates. Despite the things she's done, I think Ellie's always imagined being with Toby for the rest of her life."

The story became more complicated following the introduction of Wendy Roe as Toby's mother, Linda Mills. She arrives in Hollyoaks village wanting to move in with Toby. Baxendale explained that Ellie and Linda do not get along. She explained they are "both strong characters" and both are "vying for Toby's attention." She believed that Linda behaves worse than Ellie which causes trouble in their relationship. Writers portrayed Linda as pretentious as she tries to make it appear she has a good relationship with her son. Baxendale concluded "it's obvious that Toby wouldn't be giving her the time of day if she wasn't his mum. He really doesn't like her as a person." Luxemburg revealed that Linda only contacts Toby when she needs his help. Toby also dislikes Linda's boyfriends because they cause animosity. He assessed that Toby and Linda get along better when she is single. Toby rejects Linda's request that she moves in with them. Luxemburg concluded that Toby "decides to stand up to his mum" and side with Ellie. She threatens to leave Hollyoaks permanently but Toby does not squander, despite it being a "tough decision". Writers made Linda another factor in Toby's murder spree as her behaviour causes Toby to murder again. Toby begins to hatch a plan to rid of Steph in case she regains her memory. Stenson told Steve Hendry from Sunday Mail that she was unsure if Steph would regain her memory. She explained "she is desperate to remember what happened to her... and Toby obviously doesn't want her to."

Ellie presumes he is grieving over his mother's death when he struggles with his guilt. To conceal his crimes, Toby agrees to try counselling. He then tries to convince Ellie to move away with him to resolve his guilt. Toby leaves alone when Ellie refuses, but upon his return he reveals he is a murderer. Luxemburg told Dorothy Koomson from All About Soap that Toby feels he cannot continue to deceive Ellie. Toby tells Ellie that he killed Linda and was the perpetrator of Steph's attack, but she refuses to believe him. Luxemburg explained that "at first Ellie doesn't believe a word of what Toby says, but he keeps repeating it until she does." Ellie makes excuses for Toby and "justifies" his behaviour claiming that Linda's death was an accident and Steph provoked him. Luxemburg branfed Toby as "selfish" for telling Ellie the truth and he knows that he and Ellie need honesty for their relationship to succeed. Toby deludes himself that their relationship is "stronger than ever" but the burden of his crimes "is really doing Ellie's head in". He concluded that Toby is "deluded if he thinks he can get away with what he's done, especially now he's confessed."

In an interview with Alison James from Soaplife, Baxendale assessed that Ellie is "losing her mind" and "not thinking rationally". Ellie loves Toby, "adores him almost to the point of obsession." Ellie convinces Toby to keep Steph's attack a secret to preserve their own relationship. She fools herself that Toby is lying about Steph's attack because of his grief over his mother's death. Soon Ellie figures out that Toby is the local serial killer when she realises similarities between Steph's attack and the recent murder victims. When another woman is murdered, Ellie checks her diary and realises that Toby was missing at the time of the murder and knows he is responsible. Writers portrayed a regretful Ellie in a worse predicament, lying and protecting serial murderer. Ellie is aware that should Toby murder again, she could be legally tried as an accessory to his crimes. Baxendale explained that her character is "just too freaked out" to consider what will happen next. She told an All About Soap reporter that Ellie is "really under pressure", in denial and that it is an "awful" scenario. Ellie reaches a point where she has to admit she is living with a murderer. Ellie also worries when Toby is alone with her sister, Lisa Hunter (Gemma Atkinson). Baxendale revealed that Ellie cannot hide her relief that Lisa is unharmed. Toby is "upset" by her reaction and flees Chester, leaving Ellie fearful of his murderous retaliation, adding "Ellie is scared he'll kill again."

Writers created an ally for Toby via Ellie's brother Dan, who suspects that Ellie is having an affair with Scott. McNair told Alison James from Soaplife that Dan does not trust Ellie and thinks she is a "bitch". He sides with Toby throughout the entire storyline, unaware his sister is living with a murderer. When Toby kills another woman, he is bruised from the struggle. Dan sees Toby's injuries and when he finds the Mills flat ransacked he assumes Ellie is domestically abusing Toby. McNair defended Dan's actions because he knows something is not right but always blames Ellie. Toby and Ellie decide to begin a family but Ellie is reluctant. She begins taking contraception medication to prevent a pregnancy occurring. Dan discovers this and divulges the truth to Toby. McNair added "Toby's happy" about the prospect of becoming a father but Dan knows otherwise. Dan presumes "Ellie's being selfish as always" and sides with Toby. Dan's revelation puts Ellie in danger, Toby confronts Ellie who manages to convince Toby that Dan is trying to ruin their relationship. Toby finds the contraception pills and is angered by Ellie's betrayal. She becomes scared for her own life and absconds to Liverpool. Toby tracks her down, locks Ellie's sister, Lisa in his flat and goes to find Ellie. Dan later discovers the truth and follows Toby to Liverpool. Luxemburg revealed that Toby becomes fixated on the idea of fate keeping him and Ellie together. He explained that "as far as he's concerned, fate says Ellie and Toby should be together forever and he can't see fate letting him down."

=== Spin-off stunts and departure ===
Toby, Ellie and Dan were featured in the late night special spin-off show titled Hollyoaks: Leap of Faith. It focused on Toby's comeuppance and death. McNair branded it "such a big storyline" and described filming the scenes in Liverpool as "exhausting to do but really exciting." It features a series of stunts which were performed by body doubles hired by Hollyoaks production. Steve Truglia, a stuntman and former SAS soldier played the role of Toby during the stunts. On-screen Toby was depicted as being run over by a car, jumping across unconnected high-rise building and falling from a rooftop ledge. Truglia filmed all the stunts which involved him being hit by a speeding car. He also performed a fifteen foot jump between two seventy-five foot rooftops and threw himself backwards from a one-hundred foot building in Liverpool city centre. At the time, the building fall was biggest physical stunt ever performed on a British soap opera.

The rooftop jumps were difficult because of the short pace run up prior to jumping. Truglia told a Wanstead and Woodford Guardian journalist that there was an airbag at the bottom of gapped building in case he miss and fell off the building. The main one-hundred foot fall stunt which kills Toby, required Truglia to fall the distance for real. He had to concentrate and perform the stunt with precision to land on a crash mat positioned on the pavement below. Truglia found this difficult because the scripts required him to make it appear as though Toby accidentally slips and falls from the building. He worked alongside stuntwoman Holly Lumsden who doubled as Ellie for the rooftop fall stunt. Truglia also had to wear a wig during the stunts to match the character's appearance. Truglia later assessed that it was "one of the most dangerous stunts" he had ever performed. He added that the episode's directors "made the whole job run smoothly and in a relaxed manner."

== Storylines ==
Toby first appears as the friend of Dan. The pair are arrested when they have a fight outside The Dog in the Pond public house with Adam Morgan (David Brown) and Jamie Nash (Stefan Booth). Toby moves to the village to help the Hunter family search for Ellie, when she went missing in Ibiza. He begins working at The Dog with Izzy Cornwell (Elize du Toit) and begins living there. Toby is shocked when Ellie returns to the village. Ellie warns Toby that when they had sex she may have given him gonorrhoea. Ellie tells her brother, Dan, and her father Les (John Graham Davies), who attack Toby. Toby keeps his distance from Ellie. He begins dating Mandy, but the relationship ends when Toby claims that Mandy is too possessive. Toby leaves college and begins to work part-time at The Loft. However, Ellie is the manager at The Loft, which resulted in some tension between her and Toby. Dan advised Toby to not let her get to him, but with Ellie flirting with The Loft's boss Scott, Toby could not help feeling jealous.

Toby soon discovered that Ellie's parents had thrown her out and he offered her a place to stay at The Dog. The pair began dating again, but Toby still disliked Ellie working for Scott. Soon Scott sacked her and Toby also quit his job at the Loft. Toby's mum Linda arrived, and she caused a stir in his relationship with Ellie. Ellie put Toby under pressure to choose between her or his mother. Toby made a difficult decision, and decided it was Ellie he wanted to be with and he told his mother that he'd had enough of her interfering. Toby was then worried when Ellie decided to go on a reality TV program called the Fish Tank. Toby made her promise not to flirt with any men there. During Ellie's experience of The Fish Tank, rumours started to spread around the village that Ellie had slept with someone. Toby became angry by Ellie's actions and was frustrated that Ellie had not kept her promise. Toby demanded Chloe Bruce (Mikyla Dodd) allow Ellie to get out of the Fish Tank, otherwise his relationship was over with her. Ellie was allowed out for an hour, and Toby told her that he was getting impatient and angry by Ellie's lies. Ellie got upset about how little Toby thought of her, and told him that she slept with everyone.

Toby then murdered a woman called Roxy at the River Dee. Toby was unwilling to take any responsibility for his actions. After the murder he went home and looked into a mirror and, seemingly, argued with himself, blaming someone else for his actions and telling himself that he is good. Over the next few days Toby felt guilty and especially when Ellie returned and convinced him to give their relationship one last try. A week later, Dan told Toby that he had slept with Roxy, and the police had found her body. The blame of Roxy's death went to Toby's best friend Dan after he slept with her, hours before she was murdered. Toby's best friend and Ellie's brother Dan had been arrested, but with the help of Toby's guilt, Toby provided Dan with a good solicitor as Dan had been soon released. There was not much evidence against Dan and he was released. When Toby's mother returns she tries to convince him that Ellie is cheating on him. In anger, he struck again this time on teenager Steph Dean (Carley Stenson) leaving her there for dead but the crime was witnessed and he was followed by his mother Linda. After a confrontation with his mother, Toby lashed out pushing her down the stairs. This had left Toby astonished of what he'd done, and when Ellie arrived the pair managed to make the incident look more like an accident. When the police arrived they told Toby that Linda was dead and further bad news for Toby was that Steph was alive but suffering with memory loss. Toby was left scared of the truth being discovered and feeling guilty after Steph had developed epilepsy post-attack, a condition which she would battle for the rest of her life. He then killed around 11 more blonde girls between July 2002 and October 2003. In order for Toby to stop killing these girls, he needed Ellie to be more committed to him and decided to marry her. Ellie was delighted as the pair got married in a low profile wedding without inviting Ellie's parents. Steph continues to make progress and begins regaining her memory. Toby confesses to Ellie leaving her frightened and afraid of his next move. Toby was also scared that Ellie would tell the police or her family and stopped her from leaving his flat.

In the late-night special Hollyoaks: Leap of Faith, Ellie could no longer cope with Toby and ran off to Liverpool, with Toby close in her wake. Ellie confronted him and Toby promised that he would hand himself in, but he just wanted to enjoy his last few hours with her. After the hours went by, Toby caught Ellie trying to get in contact with her brother which made Toby furious. Toby decided to bet with Ellie whether their love could survive anything, and suggested they each jump onto the opposite roof building. Ellie, however, was concerned as Toby continued to get increasingly aggressive. Dan arrived in time to witness Toby harming Ellie. In order to save his sister's life, Dan pushed Toby off the building, where he landed in the road and was hit by a car. This was witnessed by several people, including Ellie and Dan's sister Lisa, who had come with Dan to rescue Ellie. Toby later dies.

== Reception ==
In 2003, the character was nominated for Best Bad Boy at the Inside Soap Awards. The following year, Toby's death and Dan's trial for his murder received a nomination for Best Storyline. At the 2004 British Soap Awards, Luxemburg was nominated for the Villain of the Year and Best Exit accolades. Toby's rooftop fall was nominated for Spectacular Scene of the Year award at the same ceremony.

On 18 September 2020, Channel 4 chose the episode centric to Toby taking Ellie hostage in their flat as part of their Hollyoaks Favourites series. The series features what the broadcaster deemed "classic episodes". The BBC ran a poll to determine television's "Best Villain" in 2003. Toby was rated as the eighth best out of a list of twenty villains. Katie Byrne from Digital Spy ranked Toby at nine in her list of Hollyoaks' "nine scariest killers". She opined belongs to "far-away era" of the show and branded his killing style as "throwback terror". Byrne described a gritty end to the character, stating "you know things are about to get dark when the conclusion of a storyline is played out in a late-night one-off episode." Tina Miles (Chester Chronicle) included Toby in the top three "most sinister serial killers" ever featured in the show. Marion McMullen of South Wales Echo included Toby's murder spree in her list of twenty-five most memorable facts about Hollyoaks.

Toby gained the title of the show's "biggest killer" due to the amount of murders he committed. Claire Miller and Ian Hughes writing for Cambridge News branded Toby "Hollyoaks' most prolific serial killer - the soap has seen seven so far." They added the murder rate on the show was "reasonably quiet" until Toby was introduced. Frances Ewings from Metro named him "possessive" and "the soap's most prolific murderer" who had a "reign of terror" on the show. Ewings also questioned the plausibility of a serial killer who just murders blonde haired females, when in reality the female characters could dye their hair brown for protection. Jessica Boulton writing for Daily Mirror also assessed that Toby is one of the "most prolific" killers on Hollyoaks. Emma Clayton from Telegraph & Argus believed that Luxemburg's performance as a serial killer "struck terror into the hearts of millions of viewers." She branded Toby a "charming but deadly" character.

Emma Gunby from Liverpool Echo branded Toby "TV's least frightening serial killer". A critic from Sunday Mercury reviewed that the rooftop fall was a "dramatic climax to the serial killer storyline". A Sunday World writer assessed that Hollyoaks had become "particularly gripping" viewing because of Toby's serial killer storyline. Kate Woodward from Inside Soap described the serial killer plot as a "blonde slaying bonanza".

Soaplife's Secretan branded the character "the most dangerous and evil man in Chester" who committed "brutal murders". Another Soaplife writer was sympathetic towards Toby for having to endure a relationship with Ellie. They further assessed that "taut Toby" was originally "a mug or a martyr top put up with her antics". Their "pity" waned once they witnessed "his penchant for stoving in heads with a monkey wrench." An Inside Soap reporter praised the serial killer storyline. They stated such a character was "much needed" in the show because it was "the perfect way to remove the endless stream of golden-topped clones in the show."
