= Les Hunter (Hollyoaks) =

Fictional character from Hollyoaks

- Hollyoaks character
- Portrayed by: John Graham Davies
- Duration: 2001–2005
- First appearance: 26 April 2001
- Last appearance: 4 November 2005
- Introduced by: Jo Hallows
In-universe information
- Occupation: Mechanic; Lorry driver
- Mother: Lillian Hunter
- Wife: Sally Hunter
- Sons: Dan Hunter; Lee Hunter
- Daughters: Ellie Mills; Lisa Hunter

Les Hunter is a fictional character from the British soap opera Hollyoaks, played by John Graham Davies. The character debuted on-screen during the episode broadcast on 26 April 2001. Les is characterised as stubborn, strong-minded and an alcoholic. Writers portrayed him as often compromised by his addiction to alcohol, which affects his job in the family mechanic business.

In his early stories, Les' addiction leaves his eldest son, Dan Hunter (Andrew McNair) to run the business. He also neglects his daughter, Lisa Hunter (Gemma Atkinson) leaving Dan to fulfil the father figure role. His stories also explore his problematic marriage to Sally Hunter (Katherine Dow-Blyton). Their problems effect his son Lee Hunter (Alex Carter), who is often portrayed playing the role of peacemaker with his sparring parents. Davies was written out of Hollyoaks in 2005 and Les made his final appearance during the episode broadcast on 4 November 2005.

== Development ==
On the official Hollyoaks website, Les is described as "stubborn and strong-minded, but cursed with a fondness for alcohol." Les's mother Lillian Hunter (Judith Barker) was introduced in early 2003. Producer Jo Hallows said Lillian represents every in-law people dread coming to stay, and called her "a witch". She also explained "You start to see why Les turned out the way he did!"

In his early stories, Les is portrayed becoming addicted to alcohol and leaving his son, Dan Hunter (Andrew McNair) to look after the family garage business, Hunter and Son. Les prefers to spend his time drinking alcohol and leave Dan working alone. Initially writers focused on the introduction of Les and his children Dan and Lisa Hunter (Gemma Atkinson). Writers portrayed Les as being distant from Lisa, leaving Dan to take on a "father figure" role. NcNair told McNair told Rachel Corcoran from All About Soap that Dan wants to support Lisa in Les' absence. He added that Les cannot "handle his responsibilities or face financial problems, so he turns to booze." McNair believed that the Hunter family could succeed if Les stopped drinking alcohol. Writers focused on the Hunter family moving their family business to Hollyoaks village. The move becomes a "complete disaster", and McNair assessed that the Hunter family "have a lot of bad luck, which they bring on themselves."

Les has "weathered a rocky marriage" to Sally Hunter (Katherine Dow-Blyton) but the pair manage to reconcile. Les' eldest daughter, Ellie Mills (Sarah Baxendale) went missing in Ibiza for two years but later returns home. The ordeal left Les relying on alcohol to seek comfort from her disappearance. Writers continued to develop Les' alcoholism storyline in 2002. When Les' son, Dan gets involved in an illegal MOT racket, he loses the license for the family garage business. This worsens Les' drinking habits and effects his marriage. Les gets drunk and physically assaults Sally. She pretends the incident was her own fault and forgives Les until he gets drunk and hits her again. She decides to throw Les out of the family home.

Les also has a problematic relationship with his son Lee Hunter (Alex Carter). When Lee fails his exams he decides to train as a beautician at college. Les is disapproving of Lee choosing a career he believes to be feminine. Carter told reporters from All About Soap that "I think Mr Hunter is worried as well. He wants his son to do something a bit more manly!" Writers portrayed Les as a supportive figure during his daughter during the Hollyoaks serial killer storyline. Ellie is arrested and put on trial for concealing her husband, Toby Mills' (Henry Luxemburg) murder spree. Ellie had let her brother, Dan be accused and arrested for the murders. The remainder of the Hunter family do not support Ellie at her trial. Les decides to attend to help Ellie, but she pleads guilty. Writers portrayed Les as "struggling" to cope with Ellie's admission of guilt. Baxendale believed that Les struggled more than Ellie at the trial. She told Kate Woodward from Inside Soap that Ellie "takes whatever is thrown at her. She panics beforehand but I think her dad gets more upset than she does."

In 2004, writers revisited Les and Sally's tumultuous marriage. This has a negative effect on their son, Lee, who struggles with the prospect of a broken family. Carter told an Inside Soap reporter that Lee decides to intervene in his parents' marriage. He explained that "seeing his parents split is the last straw" and he convinces Les to make an emotional speech to Sally to prevent a divorce. Carter added that in typical Les style, he messes up and annoys Sally further. Carter assessed that it was actually "the final nail in the coffin" for them. Les attempts to convince Sally to stay with him, but this results in hysterical laughter. Carter explained that Les realises he needs to act to save his marriage and dresses in his old leather biking outfit to woo Sally. This results in Sally berating Les for believing an old outfit could save a broken marriage. Carter concluded that "I think he'll just have to accept things will never be the same again."

After six months, Les decides to take a job in Norwich and asks Sally to join him despite them still being estranged. Sally struggles with Les' proposition so Lee and his friend Bombhead (Lee Otway) decide to intervene. Carter told an Inside Soap reporter that Lee is "devastated" his parents marriage could be over permanently. Carter explained that Lee does not want Les to leave, but accepts that if he reunites with Sally it will "soften the blow" for the Hunter family. Lee and Bombhead set Les and Sally up on a date and they realise they have been tricked. Carter added that "after a while they have fun, which hasn't happened for ages. It reminds them of the old days and gets Sally thinking about her feelings." Les and Sally begin to reconcile and Lee is "delighted" when he catches Les leaving Sally's bedroom and his plan has worked. Les is asked to start his new job immediately and he asks Sally to join him. She agrees and hands in her resignation at the school. Bombhead realises Sally is unsure about the move and she reveals that she is "torn" about what to do.

Les' departure was part of what the Sunday Mirror described as the "biggest massacre in soap history". His exit coincided with the exits of the majority of the Hunter family: Lisa, Lee and Sally. His departure storyline featured Les and Sally moving to Cyprus, following the death of their son, Dan. Just before they plan to leave, Sally declares she cannot leave because she has a phobia of aeroplanes. Lee tries to hypnotise Sally and cure her, but his attempts fail. Les purchases a motorbike complete with a sidecar and convinces Sally to go ahead with their move. Sally takes the driver's seat and Les gets into the side car as they leave the village for good. The character made his final appearance on 4 November 2005.

== Storylines ==
Les arrives in the village as the moody husband of Sally and father of Ellie, Dan, Lee and Lisa. He was strict on his youngest daughter Lisa and had owned the garage "Hunter and Sons", with his son Dan. Shortly, Sally arrives, and Les and Sally went through a rough patch when daughter Ellie had gone missing. Les became depressed about his family problems and he would drown his sorrows with alcohol. Soon, though daughter Ellie arrived after two years, but things got bad to worse. Les was angered by the attitude Ellie had after her arrival, and Les was frustrated when he discovered that Lisa harms herself. With all these family problems going on, Les was even more shocked when his business was not doing too well, and son Dan ended up getting himself involved with Dodgy motors. Les was furious with Dan, and the police got involved, which resulted to the garage being closed down. Les turned to alcohol again, and argued with Sally further, but the situation became worse when he raised his hand towards her. Following the incident, Les was thrown out, and finally decided to get his act together. Les began to give up his drink, and soon got a new job as a lorry driver, a business venture he started with newcomer Johnno Dean (Mark Powley), who he soon became close friends with. Les moved back in with his family, however more trouble arrived when Dan was arrested for murder. The scenario of Dan being arrested was to be one whole nightmare for Les and his family as later he would discover.

Les' son-in-law Toby was pushed off a building by Dan, while Ellie also fell off as she was struggling to fight for her life. Toby had died and Dan was in shock as he heard Ellie fighting with Toby, as Ellie confessed to him that her husband was a serial killer. However, it all got too much for Les as Dan was arrested for the serial killing murders and Ellie sent him down after she testified against him in court. With both Sally and Lisa arguing against Ellie, again Les turned to his alcohol addiction. To make matters worse still, Les and Johnno's workplace collapsed at this time, leaving both parties unemployed and in massive debt, and this pushed Les even closer to the edge. But eventually things began to get better when Ellie realised Dan's innocence and retracted her testimony. Dan was released, but it was short-lived, as he died in his rally race. Les comfort his family as they how to cope yet with another tragedy. Les realised with all this terrible times for him and his family, he had to support them as he managed to avoid alcohol. Slowly, the Hunter family began to rebuild their lives, but youngest daughter Lisa had an affair with an older man, none other than Jake Dean (Kevin Sacre), the son of Les' former business partner Johnno, who by that time had left Hollyoaks; but after a rash reaction, eventually Les realised that he had to try a new approach in order to get the best from his children. With many bad memories in Hollyoaks, Les decided a move away would be good along with wife Sally as a fresh start is what the pair need. Therefore, Les said farewell along with wife Sally on a motorbike as they had sold up to live in Cyprus.

== Reception ==
A writer from Whats On Stage branded Les the "alcoholic dad". An Inside Soap reporter branded Les an "angry man" who is "seeking solace at the bottom of a bottle." All About Soap's Rachel Corcoran branded Les as a character who "likes a pint or two" and "can't handle fatherhood".
