= Lisa Hunter =

UK soap opera character, created 2001

- Hollyoaks character
- Portrayed by: Gemma Atkinson
- Duration: 2001–2005, 2022
- First appearance: 23 April 2001
- Last appearance: 18 March 2022
- Introduced by: Jo Hallows (2001); Lucy Allan (2022)
- Book appearances: Hollyoaks: Seeing Red
- Spin-off appearances: Hollyoaks: After Hours (2004); Hollyoaks: Let Loose (2005); Hollyoaks: In the City (2006)
In-universe information
- Occupation: Model
- Father: Les Hunter
- Mother: Sally Hunter
- Brothers: Dan Hunter; Lee Hunter
- Sisters: Ellie Mills

Lisa Hunter is a fictional character from the British Channel 4 soap opera Hollyoaks, played by Gemma Atkinson. She made her first appearance during the episode broadcast on 23 April 2001. The character is noted for her storylines including bullying and self-harming. After her exit from Hollyoaks, Atkinson reprised the role twice in two spin-off series. In November 2021, it was announced that Atkinson would be returning to Hollyoaks for a guest appearance, with her return airing in March 2022.

== Development ==
=== Casting ===
Actress Gemma Atkinson was cast in the role of Lisa, a member of the new Hunter family, in 2001. She made her first appearance on 23 April 2001. Lisa joins the local secondary school, where she is bullied by Zara Morgan (Kelly Greenwood) and Abby Davies (Helen Noble) after they "take an instant dislike to her."

During 2004, Atkinson was reported to have been axed from the soap along with her on-screen family. Despite this, the character stayed onscreen until 2005, before making further appearances in spin-offs Hollyoaks: Let Loose and Hollyoaks: In the City.

Reports of the character's return arose in 2007, with Atkinson supposedly signing a £100,000 a year deal with the show. This was eventually denied by a spokeswoman for the show, who told Digital Spy:"There are no current plans for Gemma Atkinson to return to Hollyoaks in the foreseeable future." Hollyoaks series producer at that time, Bryan Kirkwood, also commented on the speculation of her return: "Gemma's a real star and I have chatted with her and her agent about the possibility of a future return. None of us feels that it's right at the moment but there's a chance it could happen in the future. There's nothing signed and nothing planned for the foreseeable future."

In 2010, Atkinson announced she desired to return to the soap for a guest stint, she said: "I've not been asked to, but I'd love to go back for a few episodes. In the show, one brother has died, my sister is in France and the older brother is now in Emmerdale, so I don't know how they would introduce Lisa back." However, several weeks after Atkinson's statement, it was announced that Alex Carter, who played Lisa's brother Lee, would return to the show later in 2010. In an interview following his return, Carter was asked whether he would like Atkinson to return, to which he said: "Yeah! I don't know if she will and I haven't spoken to her for a long time — I went to her birthday a couple of years ago and I've not spoken to her since. But yeah, why not? Get them all back! It'd be good to see Lisa, wouldn't it?" The serial offered her a 12-month contract for her return, but she turned it down because she didn't want to become "stuck in a rut". In November 2021, it was announced by Birmingham Mail that Atkinson would be returning to Hollyoaks. Hollyoaks confirmed via social media that the return would be a guest appearance. Her return scenes aired on 16 March 2022.

=== Relationships ===
Writers developed a relationship story between Lisa and new character Cameron Clark (Ben Gerrard). Soon after they begin dating, Lisa begins to receive abusive text messages. Atkinson told a reporter from Inside Soap that the abusive messages begin because she is with Cameron and receives abuse calling her a "slag" and that she is being watched. She explained that "lots of kids at school have been jealous of her and Cameron". Atkinson believed Lisa is most affected by a text questioning whether or not Cameron is aware that she self-harms. In addition, Lisa realises the mystery harasser must be someone close to her. Cameron tries to expose the culprit by telephoning the number and Zara Morgan (Kelly Greenwood) answers. Atkinson said "Cameron immediately assumes it must be Zara, so Lisa confronts her about it."

In a plot twist, Zara reveals that the phone belongs to their ex-boyfriend Brian Drake's (Jonathan Le Billon) phone. He reveals that he wanted revenge for Lisa ending their previous relationship. Atkinson revealed that Brian also blames Lisa for failing his exams and "wrecking his life". Writers portrayed Lisa as sympathetic towards Brian's plight and "feels sorry for Brian more than anything". Lisa accepts responsibility for her actions with Atkinson explaining that "she realises he's right - a lot of Brian's problems are down to her self-harming." She hoped that Lisa and Cameron would be able to move on from their ordeal and build a successful relationship. She concluded "Lisa's been through so much, it would be nice to see her smiling again."

=== Spin-offs ===
After her departure from the Hollyoaks show, Atkinson and Marcus Patric (Ben Davies) signed to appear in spin-off Hollyoaks: Let Loose, which saw the characters moving on with their lives following their departures from Hollyoaks village. The series received poor viewing figures and another series was not produced.

In 2006, details of a follow-up spin-off, Hollyoaks: In the City, were announced. Several other characters were cast from actors including Philip Olivier, Leon Lopez, Oliver Lee and Kym Marsh. The series, which followed Ben and Lisa to Liverpool, was aired on Channel 4 sister channel E4 during August to December 2006. Despite fair ratings, the series was axed by E4 in December 2006. However, the character of Lisa was left open for a possible return.

== Storylines ==
Lisa becomes popular at school, much to the dislike of jealous Steph Dean (Carley Stenson), who then begins to bully her. Sick of the bullying and after some family problems, Lisa turns to self-harming. Lisa keeps her secret from everyone until Brian Drake finds the cuts on her arms and legs and assumes she is being abused and calls a social worker. Lisa then admits to self harming. She begins to see a counsellor and her life slowly returns to normal. Lisa begins a relationship with Brian, however she becomes rather reliant on his help when family troubles get her down. The pair split up just before their exams start. Cameron arrives and immediately takes a shine to Lisa. Eventually the pair start a relationship. Lisa starts to get threatening text messages from a mysterious stalker. Her friends assume it is Steph due to the bullying and her jealousy over Lisa's relationship with Cameron. Lisa's stalker is revealed to be her jealous ex-boyfriend Brian, who blames her for his exam failure. Cameron and Lisa lose their virginity to each other, but break up. Lisa briefly dates Kristian Hargreaves (Max Brown), however it does not last. More bad news occurs for Lisa as her older brother Lee (Alex Carter) was getting in trouble with the police and started failed exams, while her sister Ellie (Sarah Baxendale) disappears in Ibiza for almost two years, but she ultimately returns to the village.

Meanwhile, Steph resumes her relentless bullying of Lisa after discovering that her brother-in-law, serial killer Toby Mills (Henry Luxemburg), was responsible for an attack that nearly cost Steph her life and left her with epilepsy, which pushes Lisa closer to the edge once again. However, after Steph unleashes a cruel and vicious physical attack on a tearful Lisa outside the Drive 'n' Buy, Steph's father Johnno Dean (Colin Wells) comes to the rescue. After pulling Steph off her victim, Johnno publicly reprimands Steph for her behaviour and orders her to leave Lisa alone. The two reconcile later on, and Steph apologises to Lisa for her constant bullying. After the death of her brother Dan (Andrew McNair), Lisa becomes more confident and is determined to enjoy life to the fullest. She begins to go off the rails and has an affair with Dan's friend, Jake Dean (Kevin Sacre), which ends up with him contracting an STD. Lisa decides she wants to be with Jake, however he tells her he loves his girlfriend Becca Hayton (Ali Bastian). Jake confesses his affair to Becca, who then ends her friendship with Lisa. Lisa then turns her affections to Ben Davies (Marcus Patric), which angers his girlfriend Louise Summers (Roxanne McKee). Ben leaves Louise for Lisa and the pair decide to leave the village together.

After their departure from Hollyoaks, Ben and Lisa start a new life. Cracks begin to show in the relationship as Ben cheats and Lisa ends up self-harming again. Lisa plans to move to Cyprus, leaving Ben, however he stops her and convinces her to give their relationship another chance. In Hollyoaks: In the City, Ben and Lisa return from a holiday to Liverpool, where Lisa begins working as a receptionist and a model. Ben attempts to buy a bar but is ripped off by a con man losing all his savings, the pair move in with his friend Tank-Top and his flatmate Adam. Ben gets a job with shady local entrepreneur Burton Phillips.Yet again Lisa and Ben's relationship struggles as they both cheat. Later in the series, Lisa is kidnapped by her new boss Stella to be used in a snuff film as Ben races to save her, however, Stella's conscience gets the better of her and she frees Lisa, who, during a scuffle, takes one of Stella's henchman's guns whilst trying to escape, Ben bursts into the room and Lisa accidentally shoots him, killing him. As the police arrive and arrest Stella and her gang, Lisa cradles Ben's body in her arms as Tank-Top and Burton look on.

Lisa returns to the village 17 years later with boyfriend Dylan Barker (Max Rinehart) reuniting with Zara Morgan and Luke Morgan. Tom Cunningham is delighted as he reveals to Zara that Lisa was his first crush. However, Lisa and Dylan have an agenda, a protest that leaves Zara behind bars. Lisa later apologises to Zara via voicemail.

== Reception ==
In 2002, Gemma Atkinson was nominated for Best Actress, Sexiest Female and Best Newcomer at the British Soap Awards for her portrayal of Lisa. Atkinson was again nominated for 'Best Actress' in the 2003 awards and also for the award of Best Dramatic Performance From a Young Actor or Actress in the 2004 British Soap Awards. Lisa's self-harming story was nominated for Best Storyline at the 2004 Inside Soap Awards.

Virgin Media profiled some of Hollyoaks' "hottest females" in their opinion, of Lisa they stated: "Lisa Hunter transformed from a bullied teenager into the ultimate sexpot overnight. With two steamy affairs under her belt, Lisa eventually left the village with Ben Davies – we bet [Atkinson's then-boyfriend] Ronaldo was mega jeals!" They have also described Lisa as having an "intense personality" and credit "her parents' tumultuous relationship, a missing sister, her affair with an engaged man, her brother's death and her self-harming" have caused Lisa to have an extremely troubled life.
