= Dan Hunter (Hollyoaks) =

Fictional character from Hollyoaks

- Hollyoaks character
- Portrayed by: Andy McNair
- Duration: 2001–2004
- First appearance: 19 April 2001
- Last appearance: 24 December 2004
- Spin-off appearances: Hollyoaks: Leap of Faith (2003); Hollyoaks: After Hours (2004)
In-universe information
- Occupation: Student; Mechanic
- Father: Les Hunter
- Mother: Sally Hunter
- Brothers: Lee Hunter
- Sisters: Lisa Hunter; Ellie Mills

Dan Hunter is a fictional character from the British soap opera Hollyoaks, played by Andy McNair. The character debuted on-screen during the episode broadcast on 19 April 2001. McNair attended an audition for the role and was called back for a second audition, after which he was informed he had won the role. Dan is characterised as "moody and non-conformist" and has an anger problem. McNair believed Dan is defined by his miserable personality. He never became bored of playing the character's misery and admired his characterisation. He is initially portrayed as a loner who is disinterested in romance due to the pressure of working at his family garage business. Writers portrayed the illness diabetes via Dan and he takes insulin to control his condition. McNair found the story challenging to portray and thoroughly researched the condition to add authenticity to the character.

He introduced as part of the show's Hunter family consisting of Dan, his parents Les Hunter (John Graham Davies) and Sally Hunter (Katherine Dow Blyton) and siblings Lisa Hunter (Gemma Atkinson) and Lee Hunter (Alex Carter). Producers later introduced Dan's other sister, Ellie Hunter (Sarah Baxendale), who had been a missing person in Ibiza. Writers developed a feud between them, with Dan blaming her for ruining their family, resulting in a fight which prompts Dan to stop taking his insulin. Dan's main friendship was with Ben Davies (Marcus Patric), whose characterisation suited Dan's dislike to talk about their problems. A prominent relationship story for Dan was developed with Debbie Dean (Jodi Albert). Writers portrayed a "stormy" couple dynamic, with Dan also romancing Debbie's sister, Steph Dean (Carley Stenson). Other storylines include a rally driving plot and helping a criminal repair stolen cars. McNair made his finale appearance as Dan during the episode broadcast on 24 December 2004.

== Casting ==
McNair was cast in the role in 2001. He had previously worked as a model and presenter, with Dan being his first professional acting role. McNair's agent contacted him enquiring if he would be interested in attending some auditions for Hollyoaks. McNair agreed but was apprehensive due to his lack of experience. He attended the first audition and received an audition recall two weeks later. This time casting directors were auditioned for the roles of Dan's father Les Hunter (John Graham Davies) and sister, Lisa Hunter (Gemma Atkinson). McNair recalled that producers offered him the role of Dan twenty minutes after he returned home from the audition. Of his casting, he added "I was amazed; I jumped up and smacked my head on the door frame!" In an interview with an All About Soap reporter, McNair claimed that he did not believe he would win the role. He added "I didn't really try that hard. I think that's why I was chosen". The character debuted on-screen during the episode broadcast on 19 April 2001. Producers were happy with McNair's performances as Dan and later offered him long-term contracts. In 2003, McNair reflected that he "got lucky" being offered the role and that he "would have been a fool to turn it down."

== Development ==
=== Characterisation ===
A writer from the official Hollyoaks website described Dan as "moody and non-conformist". McNair told Matthew Evans, author of Phil Redmond's Hollyoaks: The Official Companion, that Dan is a "such a prat" and different to his own personality. He described Dan as whinging and "miserable, a male chauvinist and is constantly angry with everybody." McNair believed these personality traits made the character "enjoyable" to play. Playing Dan began to impact McNair's own personality. He told Evans that would leave work feeling "a right grump", say things that only Dan would say and realise after the fact. Dan is initially a solitary character because of his work and family problems. McNair explained that Dan does not have many friends because of his whinging ways. Writers created a friendship with Dan and Ben Davies (Marcus Patric). McNair believed they were well suited as friends because "the both understand each other's area of life that they don't want to talk about." In another interview (All About Soap), McNair described Dan as "fairly moody and a bit of a loner". He revealed that "I don't think he wants many people to know him". He added that Dan possesses a "mean streak" and "he can get quite explosive. McNair revealed he is completely different to Dan, who is "moody" and "miserable". He considered himself not as quiet and "more over the top" than Dan. McNair jested that Dan is so miserable he was unable to recall the last time he smiled, adding "he doesn't smile very much does he?" McNair never got bored of playing a miserable character but would have liked more comedic scenes. Being miserable is who Dan is and "I wouldn't want to change him for the world."

In the show, Dan is a mechanic who later opens his own business called "Dan's Pit Stop". The official Hollyoaks website hosted a fictitious website dedicated to Dan's Pit Stop. Dan is also portrayed as having diabetes and takes insulin to control the condition. To portray the condition accurately, McNair revealed he "thoroughly" researched diabetes and found it "the most challenging" of Dan's stories. He added that prior to playing Dan, like most people he was uneducated about the disease. McNair explained that the writers explored the story briefly and ensured that his condition is mentioned in scenes, but he believed that more could have been done with the diabetic storyline. He added, "I enjoy playing that part and I see no reason for it to die away really." Writers explored the social stigma regarding diabetes when Izzy Cornwell (Elize du Toit) discovers Dan's insulin syringe in his bag; she assumes that Dan is a drug addict and she tells Adam Morgan (David Brown), who then reports Dan to the college principal.

=== Introduction stories ===
Dan is introduced into the series as a new student studying a Higher National Diploma in mechanics at Hollyoaks Community College. Dan divides his time studying and working in the Hunter and Son garage. In one of Dan's first scenes, he gets into a fight with Tony Hutchinson (Nick Pickard). McNair believed it showcased Dan's "explosive personality" and began a feud between them. He added that the two characters do not get along and Dan "is not prepared to put up with Tony." McNair added that many of Dan's original scenes were with Tony. He described working on the plot with Pickard as "great fun". In his early storylines, Dan is portrayed taking on the burden of running the family garage business. His father, Les prefers to drink alcohol and leave Dan to work alone. Initially writers focused on the introduction of Les, Dan and his sister Lisa. They portrayed a dynamic between Dan and Lisa, where he takes on a "father figure" role. NcNair told McNair told Rachel Corcoran from All About Soap that Dan "wants to be there for her when Les isn't." He added that Les cannot "handle his responsibilities" of work and finances so turns to alcohol to cope. He concluded that the only way the Hunter family would succeed is if Les gives up drinking. Writers focused on the Hunter family moving their family business to Hollyoaks village. The move becomes a "complete disaster", and McNair assessed that the Hunter family "have a lot of bad luck, which they bring on themselves." McNair noted that Hollyoaks upheld a tradition of casting actors with different accents despite their characters being family. He praised the Hunter family castings for all having the same accent because "it does work very well".

Writers portrayed Dan in his early stories as being popular with female characters. Geri Hudson (Joanna Taylor) initially takes a romantic interest in Dan, but he does not reciprocate. McNair described Geri as "all over [Dan] like a rash" and only tries to seduce him at "inopportune times" which makes him disinterested. They created Dan's first romance storyline with Izzy. She kisses Dan but prevents anything further from happening. McNair told Corcoran that "Dan doesn't know what's going on" and that Izzy is basically "teasing him and giving him a taste of his own medicine." He explained that Dan views Izzy as a "posh girl who has too much money" but there is something about her that he finds "intriguing". The romance story was not developed further. McNair believed it played into Dan's characterisation with women "being the last thing on his mind". He added that Dan other stories such as work and family responsibilities make him too preoccupied for romance. McNair also theorised that Dan has "an underlying issue" with trusting women because of the behaviours of his female family members.

=== Rally driving ===
Writers created a story involving Dan rally driving and getting into trouble with police. With Ben as his passenger, they nearly run over Anna Green (Lisa M. Kay), who is pregnant and Dan is pulled over by police for dangerous driving. Dan refuses to show his relevant driving documents to the police because he blames them for the incident. McNair told Corcoran that he "only feel guilty" about nearly knocking Anna down in his car because she is pregnant. He explained that Dan "likes to vent his anger by driving round like a maniac, he doesn't think of the consequences." McNair added that Dan believes the police will forget about the incident, but they issue him a court summons. McNair described Dan as "really angry" and does not consider how his actions will Ben's life. Dan is portrayed a "spoilt brat" only concerned about losing his driving license.

Dan begins lying to Les that the matter has been resolved. The plot continues with Dan attending illegal rally driving races. He challenges Tel to a race. McNair believed Dan wants bring "wide boy" Tel "down a peg or two". To prepare for the story, McNair took a rally driving lesson with a professional driver. Production used stunt drivers to film the rally scenes. Though McNair and Patric were filmed delivering dialogue for scenes while driving in a vehicle. McNair recalled that in one scene, he accidentally used the accelerator harshly and nearly hit a tree. McNair told Evans that the rally driving plot was one of his favourite storylines. In 2004, McNair recalled "When I did that storyline that was some of the best stuff I've ever done - I really enjoyed it. It's absolutely brilliant."

=== Feud with Ellie Hunter ===
Writers explored the relationship dynamic between Dan and his erratic sister Ellie Hunter (Sarah Baxendale). She had been missing in Ibiza for some time and unapologetically returned to live with the Hunter family. Dan struggles to cope with Ellie's reappearance because she refuses to take responsibility for her actions. McNair told All About Soap's Karen Dunn that "Ellie just doesn't realise the effect her disappearance had. Dan tries to make her sit up and think about what she has done, however she is not interested." Baxendale agreed with McNair's assessment of the dynamic. She told Soaplife's Alison James, that Dan's anger comes from Ellie downplaying her disappearance and "he really resents her for that." His mother, Sally Hunter (Katherine Dow Blyton) realises the Hunter clan need to bond and suggests a family holiday. Ellie responds by telling her that she would rather holiday with friends, which further annoys Dan. McNair explained that Ellie's behaviour and the family's financial woes begin to take their toll on his health.

Dan begins to work on cars for a criminal named Ronnie. When he needs more money, Dan agrees to work on stolen vehicles that Ronnie gets hold of. McNair said that Dan does not think about the danger and Ellie discovers the truth. McNair added "now Ellie has something on Dan she starts to wind him up about it." This causes an argument which develops into a physical fight when Ellie punches him; "they end up throwing things at each other and trash the house." Ellie responds by threatening to leave again, Dan cannot prevent her from leaving and she steals his car and absconds. Dan also loses another contract with Ronnie which writers portrayed a drastic reaction to. Dan, who is portrayed as a diabetic and uses insulin. In a fit of rage Dan throws his insulin away. McNair believed Dan had no intention of committing suicide but he is "gutted", "very angry" and "he's just fed up of all the pressure and taking it out on his diabetes - he doesn't think about the consequences." The incident results in Dan risking his life. In June 2003, McNair stated that Dan does "love" Ellie despite their feud.

Writers introduced Dan into the show's serial killer storyline. Dan's brother-in-law, Toby Mills (Henry Luxemburg) is the killer and Ellie discovers the truth. Dan remains unaware of Toby's true identity and sides with him when Ellie and Toby's relationship becomes fraught. Dan suspects that Ellie is having an affair with Scott Anderson (Daniel Hyde). McNair told Alison James from Soaplife that Dan does not trust Ellie and "knows what a bitch she can be". Dan continues to defend Toby throughout the entire storyline, unaware his sister is living with a murderer. When Toby kills another woman, he is bruised from the struggle. Dan notices Toby's injuries and when he discovers Toby and Ellie's flat trashed he assumes his sister is domestically abusing Toby. McNair defended Dan's blunder because he knows something is not right but always blames Ellie. She reluctantly agrees to begin a family with Toby, but secretly takes contraception medication to prevent a pregnancy. Dan discovers this and divulges the truth to Toby. McNair added "Toby's happy" about the prospect of becoming a father but Dan knows otherwise. Dan presumes "Ellie's being selfish as always" and sides with Toby again. Dan's revelation puts Ellie in danger, Toby confronts Ellie who manages to convince Toby that Dan is trying to ruin their relationship. Toby finds the contraception pills and is angered by Ellie's betrayal. She becomes scared for her own life and absconds to Liverpool. Toby tracks her down, locks Lisa in his flat and goes to find Ellie. Dan later discovers the truth and he and Lisa go to Liverpool to find Toby and Ellie. McNair explained that Dan is "totally innocent in it all" but ends up "very involved" in the storyline after arriving in Liverpool. He concluded that the scenes filmed in Liverpool were "exhausting" but it was "great" to be included in "such a big storyline".

Ellie later allows Dan to be put on trial for Toby's murder. McNair believed that Dan would have not allowed Ellie to suffer the same fate. He noted that Ellie is "now too far in to do anything else". The actor researched the Dan's court case and prison story by taking inspiration from other television shows and books. He added "you have read and then try and put yourself in that place. You've got to go on how you yourself would react to it." McNair was loath to watch his performances on Hollyoaks in case he became too critical of his acting. He made an exception for Dan's trial because he had "been looking forward" to the story.

Ellie is later sent to trial to determine whether she is innocent of guilty of being complicit in Toby's crimes and perverting the course of justice. Baxendale told Kate Woodward from Inside Soap that Ellie hopes she will be found guilty and wants to be punished. Sally and Lisa refuse to support Ellie for allowing Dan to be sent to prison for murder. Baxendale added that Ellie acknowledges her that her behaviour towards Dan has caused her family to suffer and that Les supports her during the trial.

=== Relationship with Debbie Dean ===
Writers later created a romance between Dan and Debbie Dean (Jodi Albert). She is Dan's first serious love interest and McNair explained Dan is "still coming to terms with that really". He assessed that their relationship is "stormy" because both characters are "very set in their ways and they are in turn quite different." McNair told Joanne Tebbutt from All About Soap that Dan was attracted to Debbie because she paid him attention. He believed the duo understood each other well because they "came from similar backgrounds". The Hunter and Dean families have "strong family values" and are both "hectic households". Debbie's desire to be famous is an issue for Dan, who wants to remain focused on his business. McNair added that Dan wants Debbie to be happy but would struggle if her career is successful. Albert told Tebbutt's colleague, Dorothy Koomson that Dan has issues with Debbie having fun, he loses his temper and Debbie becomes defensive.

Debbie likes Dan's "whole rugged, manly look" and his "real bloke" image. Debbie also liked the challenge Dan provided her, where she had to "crack his hard shell". She noted that Dan's "very serious and pretty moody" but Debbie eventually finds his "soft spots". Albert believed that Dan's moodiness and Debbie's "light-hearted approach to life" balanced well and formed a good dynamic. Debbie has a tendency to "overreact" in the relationship and Dan is portrayed as the one willing to sort of their problems. McNair noted that Debbie enjoys bossing Dan about and is the more dominant figure in the relationship. Dan and Debbie also have a strong friendship rooted in their relationship. Albert explained that this is showcased when Debbie often confides in Dan, who is supportive and they rely on each other.

In one storyline, Debbie reveals that Dan is a virgin over a web broadcast. He is embarrassed and has sex with Roxy Maguire (Harriet Green). She is murdered by the mystery serial killer the same evening, which makes Dan a prime suspect in the case. Debbie discovers the Dan and Roxy had sex, which Albert revealed left Debbie "shocked and absolutely devastated". She added that Debbie also forgives Dan because she provoked Dan's behaviour by humiliating him in the broadcast. Debbie chooses to defend Dan because despite his betrayal, she does not believe he killed Roxy. McNair believed that Dan was remorseful and apologetic about cheating on Debbie. They continue their relationship, but she still has trust issues.

Debbie finds Dan's arrest for the murder spree difficult. Albert told Rick Fulton from Daily Record that Debbie would face "a lot of heartbreak" over Dan. She described a "very hard" couple of month which occur because "she's so in love with Dan and he's going through a lot." Dan and Debbie break-up after Debbie has sex with Darren Osborne (Ashley Taylor Dawson) while Dan is in prison. Debbie then begins a relationship with Darren and Albert told an Inside Soap reporter that Dan and Debbie's relationship was "definitely over" and she now wants to be with Darren. Following their break-up, writers created a new romance between Dan and Debbie's sister, Steph Dean (Carley Stenson). This further antagonises their predicament as Dan becomes confused about his feelings. McNair informed Suzanne Ostler from Soaplife that Dan does not understand how he allowed the relationship to progress. Dan likes Steph, but her feelings are more intense and "it's very one sided" despite Dan's fakery. Dan and Steph bonded over their illnesses and experiences with Toby. McNair said that Dan is mindful of this and is uninclined to hurt her. Debbie becomes jealous of their relationship and confronts Dan, who responds by telling Debbie he no longer loves her. McNair believed Dan still loves Debbie but will not admit it because he is angry about her and Darren. Debbie responds by having sex with Ben but Dan pretends that it does not bother him. McNair revealed that Dan is "gutted" just like Debbie hoped for. He added that "Dan hates the attention" that comes from the two sisters fighting over him. Dan realises he loves Debbie when they go go-karting. This the "turning point" in the story, but Dan cannot act on his feelings. McNair concluded that this is because "the fact he's slept with her sister. His pride. Their mum who's not impressed with his behaviour. Their history."

=== Final stories and departure ===
In 2004, Dan was featured in the four-part late night spin-off series titled Hollyoaks: After Hours. Dan's story involves him, Ben, Joe Spencer (Matt Milburn), Jake Dean (Kevin Sacre) and Billie Johnson (Jenny Milburn) going on a celebratory night out following the completion of a sky dive jump in aid of charity. A writer from Daily Record revealed that the night out explores "the murky underworld of a Liverpool lap-dancing club" where they meet Saskia Browne, who is played by model Caprice Bourret. They then go to Saskia's home to continue their partying. The show's producer Jo Hallows explained that the episodes were created in response to previous successful late night episodes of Hollyoaks. She added the episodes allowed for the inclusion of "material more suitable for an older audience - hence the later time slot."

McNair made his final appearance as Dan during the episode broadcast on 24 December 2004.

== Reception ==
For his portrayal of Dan, McNair was nominated for "Best Actor" at the 2004 Inside Soap Awards. Toby Mills' death and Dan Hunter's trial for his murder was nominated for "Best Storyline" at the ceremony. All About Soap's Rachel Corcoran branded Dan a "rough and ready mechanic". She added that it was "no surprise" the character chose "to let off steam whizzing around in his rally car" having a father like Les. Merle Brown from Daily Record branded Dan "the cleanest mechanic that lived" and that he was "delighted" to set up "dodgy" car dealer Ronnie. Matthew Evans (The Official Companion) wrote that Dan "arrived in the show in style" and "immediately caused a stir" when he challenged the college's car parking system. Evans believed that Dan took on his family problems and became "the archetypical angry young man". He concluded that Dan "has led quite a solitary existence since he arrived in the show." Nicola Methven and Polly Hudson from Daily Mirror opined that Dan "being blown to smithereens on a racetrack" was "one of Hollyoaks' most dramatic exits". In April 2018, Catriona Rigney from OK! described Dan as the show's "bad boy with a sensitive side". Assessing Dan and Debbie's relationship, she added that "the course of true love didn't run smooth". Viewers liked the relationship between Dan and Debbie. In a poll ran by Inside Soap to determine whether Dan should forgive Debbie and reconcile the relationship. Sixty five per cent of readers voted that Dan should reconcile with Debbie. All About Soap's Tebbutt and Koomson assessed that Dan and Debbie "make a good couple" and there was "potential for them to be one of soap's great couples."
