= Zara Morgan =

Fictional character from Hollyoaks

- Hollyoaks character
- Portrayed by: Kelly Condron
- Duration: 1999–2005, 2021–2023
- First appearance: 1 April 1999
- Last appearance: 30 June 2023
- Introduced by: Jo Hallows (1999); Lucy Allan (2021)
- Spin-off appearances: Hollyoaks: Crossing the Line
In-universe information
- Occupation: Waitress
- Father: Andy Morgan
- Mother: Sue Morgan
- Brothers: Adam Morgan; Luke Morgan
- Sisters: Beth Morgan
- Aunts: Lydia Smith
- Nephews: Oliver Morgan

Zara Morgan is a fictional character from the British Channel 4 soap opera Hollyoaks, played by Kelly Condron. The character initially appeared from 1 April 1999 to 22 December 2005. In July 2021, 15 years after her initial departure from the soap, it was announced that Condron would be reprising her role as Zara, and she returned full-time from 5 August 2021. On 29 June 2023, it was announced that Condron was to make a second departure from Hollyoaks. Zara's final scenes aired on 30 June 2023.

== Casting ==
Condron originally attended auditions for the role of Zara's sister, Beth Morgan. When she got to the audition, Condron recalled that there were older actresses auditioning for both Beth and Zara. Condron decided to focus on auditioning to play Zara. When she was recalled for further auditions, casting directors wanted Condron to read for Zara again whilst everyone else present auditioned for Beth. Condron was successful and offered the role of Zara. On her first day filming, Condron recalled being on-set with Eve White and Ross Davidson, who play Zara's parents, Sue Morgan and Andy Morgan respectively. They were present on the show's Drive 'N' Buy shop set with the director, David Richardson. He offered them advice and tried to stop them from being nervous and "feel more settled" filming their first scenes together.

== Development ==
=== Characterisation ===
Condron described Zara as "funny, weird and a bit temperamental. She's got a different side to her that she doesn't let of lot of people see." When she is first introduced Zara appears "really clever" and "a bit of a swot", but Condron was unsure if Zara was as clever as she seemed when she had been on-screen for three years. A writer from the official Hollyoaks website described Zara as "intelligent, argumentative and moody." When Zara is introduced into the series she is portrayed as a student at Hollyoaks comprehensive school studying for her GCSEs and works as a waitress in the café, Deva.

In the book, Phil Redmond's Hollyoaks: The Official Companion, author Matthew Evans described Zara as "moody, impetuous, but highly intelligent". Zara is introduced as the youngest member of the Morgan family. She struggles to adapt to life in a new school and "caused endless trouble" and even attempts to burn down the school after a confrontation about her art project. Writers subsequently portrayed Zara as attending a psychological assessment to help her determine the state of her mental health. Condron liked working on the mental health storyline. She enjoyed Zara fooling the rest of the characters into believing she felt remorse over the school fire. She noted that Zara led "everyone astray" and made everyone believe she would change. Condron concluded that Zara never did change her behaviour. Zara also struggles with her role in the Morgan family, she is "deeply affected" by her parents' troublesome marriage and feeling inferior to her siblings. Via her relationship with Brian Drake (Jonathan Le Billon), writers transformed Zara into a goth character all to impress her new love interest. Condron liked Zara's changing fashion trends, she told an All About Soap reporter that "I love the fact she's had so many style changes, I'm always wondering what they'll dress in next." Condron revealed that her sister was a goth and was unhappy with Zara's transformation. She added that her sister often picked fault with Zara's outfits for not being authentic.

=== Friendships ===
Writers formed a friendship group for Zara with the show's other teenagers. These included Abby Davies (Helen Noble), Lisa Hunter (Gemma Atkinson), Steph Dean (Carley Stenson), Lee Hunter (Alex Carter) and Brian. One storyline featuring the group was a story involving a rumour club. The students are set a task of creating a rumour club to assess how quickly gossip can spread around a community. The assignment is supposed to be fun but Zara and Steph use the opportunity to create trouble for other characters. Stenson told an Inside Soap reporter that Steph's motivation is "purely evil" and she uses the rumour club to begin nasty rumours. Zara suggests creating a rumour about Mandy Richardson (Sarah Jayne Dunn) and Laura Burns (Lesley Johnston) being in a lesbian relationship. Zara originally wants to gain revenge on Mandy for breaking-up with her brother, Adam Morgan (David Brown). Steph continues the rumour and the other characters are too scared to prevent her because of her "bitchy" characterisation.

Writers developed a consistent friendship between Zara and fellow character Abby, with the two often sharing scenes and stories. Zara was often portrayed as the louder of the two. Noble told All About Soap's Dorothy Koomson that Abby was always protecting Zara but was unafraid to tell her when she was in the wrong. Though, Abby could not trust Zara with all her secrets because Zara's biggest personality traits were being a "massive blabbermouth". Noble explained that Zara was unable to keep a secret and that their other friend, Lisa was a better confidant.

Writers created a story that enabled Zara and Abby to share further scenes when Zara moves into the Davies household. Greenwood described Zara as the sister Abby never had and they became closer once living together. She added that Zara was always Abby's choice of friend, especially when she was upset about her mother. Their friendship was tested when Zara has sex with Abby's ex-boyfriend, Lee. Noble stated that Abby would not believe Zara could betray her in such a way but it did not mean the end of their friendship. Greenwood added that Zara is attracted to Lee, but mindful about Abby's feelings. She realises that Abby still loves Lee and Zara "couldn't hurt her like that" by further pursuing a relationship with Lee. Noble concluded that the characters would be forever bonded because they "have grown up together and have been through a lot." Greenwood added that Abby and Zara do not agree on much, but that is the "spark in a friendship" that writers gave them.

=== Departure ===
In July 2005, it was announced that the serial's production team planned to write out some of their established characters. Kris Green of Digital Spy said he had heard that Condron's contract would not be renewed. In November, it was reported she had already finished filming with the series. Condron said that she was already pursuing other projects. Producers remained secretive about how they would write Zara out of the series. The character departed on 22 December 2005.

=== Reintroduction ===
On 19 July 2021, it was announced that Condron would return in August 2021 after a 16-year absence from Hollyoaks. It was stated by Hollyoaks that she had become an "eco-warrior" and that she had matured in her years away from the fictional village. Zara's return sees her arrive in Hollyoaks for the funeral of her mother, Sue (now played by Marian McLoughlin) through social media. After being approached by the Hollyoaks casting team, Condron felt that she could not refuse their offer of reprising her role as Zara. This was accredited to Zara becoming involved in an "important and relevant" storyline which piqued Condron's interest. Condron was happy to return to the serial and thanked the cast and crew for making her feel welcome; she felt that despite it being nearly 16 years since her exit, the environment of the set felt familiar. On her character's personality, Condron said that Zara returns "all grown up" as a keen environmentalist, but affirmed that she still has a fiery and outspoken nature.

== Storylines ==
=== 1999–2005 ===
Zara arrives in the village with her family in April 1999, her father Andy having purchased Deva in an attempt to repair his marriage to her mother Sue, her brother Adam having been accepted to study at college, and Zara having been enrolled to attend Hollyoaks Comprehensive despite her record of expulsions. Zara's behaviour is driven by Andy and Sue’s failing marriage, and she would often create trouble by defying Andy and Sue at home, playing truant and bullying students at school. Zara supports Andy as he attempts to reconcile with Sue, but proceeds to make snide remarks and develops a hatred towards Sue when she decides that she wants to move on. Zara takes Sue's new relationship with a man named William very poorly and attempts to ruin their relationship. William puts up with Zara's extreme behaviour but the couple split when Sue finds out that William is married.

After Zara's brother Luke Morgan (Gary Lucy) is raped by Mark Gibbs (Colin Parry), Zara becomes the target of bullying by Steph and other students. Zara attempts to defend Luke, even attacking Steph in the school playground. The bullying exacerbates Zara's behaviour and she begins acting poorly towards her teachers. Accused by the teacher of stealing money after being caught going through her bag, Zara is informed by her headteacher that she is to be taken off the mural project in art class. A furious Zara then sets the mural on fire, which spreads to some flammables. In the aftermath, she is sent for a psychological assessment. In August 2000, Zara develops feelings for an older boy Paul Millington (Zander Ward), but he rejects her as she is only fourteen years old. Zara and Paul remain friends but Zara pretends that they are in a relationship. Her story gets out of hand when she lies that she has slept with Paul. Accusing Paul of statutory rape, Andy beats Paul to the point where he is hospitalised. Zara reveals the truth and Paul later leaves the village. Zara ends up becoming friends with Steph, and also befriends Abby when she arrives in the village. Zara also befriends Lisa, who Steph takes a disliking to due to her popularity. Zara meets and falls for Brian, even becoming a goth in an attempt to please him. This works and Zara and Brian begin a relationship until Brian falls for Lisa and breaks up with Zara on Christmas Day 2001. An upset Zara turns against Lisa and begins bullying her along with Steph. However, Zara discovers that Lisa has been self-harming and ends up reconciling with her.

Zara's sister Beth (Kate Baines) is raped by ex-footballer Scott Anderson (Daniel Hyde) during Jason Cunliffe‘s (Alex Reid) party in November 2001. Supporting Beth, Zara is incensed when Steph starts dating Scott. Steph refuses to listen to Zara, even mocking Zara about the rape, to which Zara attacks her. Their friendship is left in tatters until Steph is allowed back into the friendship group after the group worry that she has been murdered by Toby Mills (Henry Luxemburg) in July 2002. Sue and Andy ended up reconciling and marry in October 2002. When Beth is released from prison for running over Scott with her car, Sue and Andy decide to move to France with her and Zara. Zara is infuriated that she was not given a choice like Luke and Adam were, but Abby invites her to stay with her, her brother Ben Davies (Marcus Patric) and their father Will Davies (Barny Clevely), which Zara accepts. Steph, who had taken charge of the friend group, begins pushing Zara, Abby, Lisa and her brother Lee to extremes. Steph starts a "rumour club", which proved to be the final straw, and the club is dissolved. Steph's reaction leads to her being kicked out of the group.

Zara visits Andy and Sue in France in 2003, meeting a man named Hugo, who follows her back to the village. Zara had only been interested in Hugo as she wanted to lose her virginity, but Hugo is infatuated by her to her embarrassment, only leaving when Zara makes it clear that she does not want to be with him. Despite being the boyfriend of Abby, Zara takes an interest in Lee, who uses Zara to make Abby jealous. However, after Abby leaves to study in Brighton and is caught being unfaithful by Lee, he begins a relatively short-term relationship with Zara. Deciding to study law at university, Zara falls for an uninterested Sam Owen (Louis Tamone) but ends up catching the eye of Freddy Watson (Greg Kelly). Zara begins a relationship with Freddy, but Freddy is a radical environmental activist, who sets fire to the media lab as part of an animal rights demonstration. Zara and Lee are accused of playing a role in the fire and are expelled by the University. They reconcile as Zara plans to move to Thailand to work for a charity. Lee ends up accompanying her and they leave the village together in December 2005.

=== 2021–2023 ===
In July 2021, Luke informs Zara of Sue's death. Zara turns up on Luke's doorstep in August 2021, having only learned of the funeral through social media, which she is not happy about. Luke and Zara soon reconcile, but Zara is devastated to learn that Luke has frontotemporal dementia. She is also shocked when Luke’s fiancée, Cindy Cunningham (Stephanie Waring), finds visiting orders to Stephen MacGregor, a member of Mark’s gang, in Sue's belongings. Luke finds out the truth but forgets due to his dementia. Zara befriends Ripley Lennox (Ki Griffin), the owner of second-hand vintage clothing stall Sweater Thunberg, and their partner Brooke Hathaway (Tylan Grant). She joins them in global warming campaigns, and soon organizes her own protest against light pollution, and targets the village Christmas lights switch-on, leading to a feud with conspiracy theorist Becky Quentin (Katie McGlynn). After the death of Hollyoaks councilor, Tom Whitworth, Zara decides to apply for the position and competes with Tony Hutchinson (Nick Pickard). Zara is reunited with her former friend Lisa Hunter. However, Lisa and her boyfriend, Dylan Barker (Max Rinehart), have ulterior motives and they persuade Zara and Tom Cunningham (Ellis Hollins) to participate in their protest against a blood diamond auction held at Dee Valley hall. Matters are soon complicated when Dylan starts a fire and Lisa deserts her, leaving Zara to be framed for arson. She is released but her reputation suffers a blow, leading to Tony winning the election, though he appoints Zara as his PA.

Zara supports Cindy in aiding an ailing Luke, and on Cindy and Luke’s stag do in Mallorca, he falls from a cliff into the ocean and dies from his injuries. Zara soon moves in with Cindy and Grace Black (Tamara Wall) and they form a friendship. Whilst attending Tony's sister Verity's (Eve O'Hara) funeral at The Dog in the Pond, her brother Eric Foster (Angus Castle-Doughty) holds the pub hostage, in his attempt to spread misogyny, leading to Maxine Minniver (Nikki Sanderson) being shot with Eric's crossbow. In March 2023, Norma Crow (Glynis Barber) and her son Warren Fox (Jamie Lomas) crash into Cindy's business in the Grand Bazaar. When Cindy is refused a loan, Zara reluctantly joins Cindy and Grace to organise a corrupt casino night to fleece the elite of Hollyoaks, in order to help Cindy raise money to restart her business. After failing to raise money, Cindy suggests that she, Zara, and Grace organise a bank heist, which Zara refuses but reluctantly agrees to join. Zara becomes close to Damon Kinsella (Jacob Roberts) and he becomes suspicious of Zara's secretive behavior. D.S Zoe Anderson (Garcia Brown) receives a tip-off about an upcoming robbery, and Zara confesses everything to Damon. She fails to persuade him to become their getaway driver, and Zara decides to opt out from joining the heist. She tries to convince Cindy to also leave but she refuses, and when Damon changes his mind and also decides to join in, Zara decides to rejoin. Whilst going through the heist plans with Damon, they kiss, but Damon turns Zara down, having not gotten over his ex-girlfriend Liberty Savage (Jessamy Stoddart).

During the heist Zara catches Grace looking at houses to buy in Rio de Janeiro, and she finds out that Grace had intended to double cross her and Cindy, by taking all the money and leaving the country. Zara also realises that Cindy has stopped taking her bipolar medication, causing Cindy to accidentally press the emergency button, leaving all three of them locked in the bank with the alarm triggered. When Damon finally arrives, the gates are locked and he is forced to run before the police arrive. Zara talks to Damon over the radio and tells him that if things hadn't gone this way, she would have liked to have seen something romantic develop between them, but this is halted when she discovers that he had slept with Cindy after turning her down. After a confrontation, Grace apologises to Zara and Cindy for attempting to betray them and decides to take the blame for the heist, by tying Zara and Cindy and surrendering to the police. Grace is charged with kidnap and robbery, exempting Zara and Cindy from imprisonment. Zara decides to follow her dreams of working at a nature reserve in Borneo and leaves Hollyoaks once again.

== Reception ==
Karen Gunn from Soaplife branded the character "a gothic horror" and assessed "it's the new black! Zara and new beau Brian turn gothic in the fashion stakes." Dorothy Koomson from All About Soap opined that Zara and Abby made a "feisty" duo who shared an "intense" living arrangement. She believed the "potential pitfall" of the friendship arose due to Zara having sex with Lee. Merle Brown from Daily Record disliked the Morgan family, branding them "the manky Morgans". Referencing a scene featuring "the lovely Zara mouthing off", Brown quipped "there's an advert for contraception if there ever was one."
