= Katherine Dow Blyton =

English actress (born 1964)

- Born: 20 November 1964 (age 61); Jarrow, Tyne and Wear, England
- Occupation: Actress
- Years active: 1995–present
- Relatives: Enid Blyton (first cousin, twice removed)

Katherine Dow Blyton (born 20 November 1964) is an English actress. After beginning her acting career in the 1990s, she began making appearances in various British television series. From 2001 to 2005, she portrayed Sally Hunter on the Channel 4 soap opera Hollyoaks, after which she appeared as Harriet Finch on the ITV1 soap opera Emmerdale from 2013 to 2022.

== Early life ==
Blyton was born on 20 November 1964 and was raised in Jarrow, Tyne and Wear. Her mother was a nurse, while her father worked for a paper company. Whilst pregnant with Blyton, her mother starred in a production of Grease. Blyton is distantly related to writer Enid Blyton, who is the cousin of her grandfather. In her youth, she worked at a greengrocers, earning £5 a day.

== Career ==
Blyton made her professional acting debut in an episode of the ITV1 crime series Cracker in 1995, in which she played a doctor. A year later, her film debut came about in Brassed Off (1996), as well as continuing to make minor appearances in various British television series including soaps Emmerdale and Coronation Street. In 2001, she was cast as Sally Hunter on the Channel 4 soap opera Hollyoaks, a role she stayed in until 2005. Following Hollyoaks, she continued making varied appearances in television series, including a role in This Is England '86 as Chrissy Jenkins in 2011, as well as starring in the first series of the BBC drama The Syndicate in 2012. She also appeared in various stage productions, including A Taste of Honey at the York Theatre Royal in 2007.

In 2013, Blyton joined the cast of the ITV1 soap opera Emmerdale as Harriet Finch. Her second regular soap role, her character became the vicar of the fictional town throughout her tenure. She remained in the role until 2022, when her character was killed off as part of high-profile episodes commemorating the soap's 50th anniversary. Following her exit, she confirmed that she would be continuing to pursue acting and had begun auditioning for new roles. 2023 saw her appear in an episode of the Sky One series Brassic, followed by appearing in the ITV1 medical drama Malpractice in 2025.

== Filmography ==
Year	Title	Role	Notes
1995	Cracker	Doctor	Episode: "Best Boys: Part 2"
1996	Emmerdale	Doctor	Guest role
1996	Band of Gold	Airport Official	Episode: "Love"
1996, 1998, 1999, 2001, 2007	Coronation Street	Various	5 episodes
1996	Cardiac Arrest	County Infirmary Receptionist	Episode: "The Age of Consent"
1996	Out of the Blue	Alison	Episode: "Shooting Ducks"
1996	Brassed Off	Nurse	Film
1997	Hetty Wainthropp Investigates	Kelly	Episode: "A Rose by Any Other Name"
1997	Common As Muck	Policewoman	1 episode
1997	New Voices	Ann	Episode: "Alarmed"
1997	My Wonderful Life	Nursing Mother	Episode: "Dinner for Two"
1997	Screen Two	Fran	Episode: "Stone, Scissors, Paper"
1999	Lost for Words	Sister	Television film
1999	Where the Heart Is	Karen Haynes	Episode: "A Higher Duty"
1999	The Cops	Cheryl Clark	1 episode
2000	At Home with the Braithwaites	Clinic Receptionist	1 episode
2000	North Square	Sarah Frorath	1 episode
2001–2005	Hollyoaks	Sally Hunter	Regular role
2006, 2008, 2011	Doctors	Various	4 episodes
2006, 2009, 2011, 2013	Casualty	Various	4 episodes
2009	The Royal	Andrea Bennett	Episode: "The Enemy Within"
2010	This Is England '86	Chrissy Jenkins	Main role
2011	Monroe	Sarah Cormack	1 episode
2011	Sirens	Colette Fox	Recurring role
2012	Silent Witness	Deborah Barron	Guest role
2012	The Syndicate	Annie	Main role
2013	Father Brown	Annie Mace	Episode: "The Man in the Tree"
2013	The Village	Mrs. H	Recurring role
2013	Scott & Bailey	Catherine French	Episode: "Undermined"
2013	Frankie	Emma Turner	1 episode
2013	Truckers	Debbie	1 episode
2013–2022	Emmerdale	Harriet Finch	Regular role
2014	The Knife That Killed Me	Mrs. Botharm	Film
2015	This Is England '90	Chrissy Jenkins	Main role
2016	Cardboard Boy	Amanda	Short film
2017	Arnilia Grove	Mother	Short film
2023	Brassic	Geraldine	Episode: "The Manolito Problem"
2025	Malpractice	Maria Carter	Recurring role
2025	Giant	Alma Ingle	Film
