= St Helens Star =

- Type: Weekly newspaper
- Owner(s): Newsquest
- Founded: 1973
- Circulation: 11,623 (as of 2023)
- Website: sthelensstar.co.uk

The St Helens Star is a weekly paid-for newspaper in St Helens, Merseyside, England. The Star has been in circulation since 1973 and is owned by Newsquest.

== Distribution ==
The St Helens Star is delivered free to 79,085 homes throughout St. Helens Metropolitan Borough. Distribution is audited every six months by the Audited Bureau of Circulation.

== Ownership ==
The St Helens Star is published by Newsquest Cheshire / Merseyside, itself part of the Newsquest Media Group. The St Helens Star was first published in November 1973.
