= Bombhead =

British soap opera character

- Hollyoaks character
- Portrayed by: Lee Otway
- Duration: 2001–2005, 2011
- First appearance: 10 October 2001
- Last appearance: 14 January 2011
- Introduced by: Jo Hallows (2001); Paul Marquess (2011)
- Spin-off appearances: Hollyoaks: Freshers (2010)
In-universe information
- Other names: David Burke
- Occupation: Circus performer Student

David "Bombhead" Burke is a fictional character from the British soap opera Hollyoaks, played by Lee Otway. The character debuted on-screen during the episode broadcast on 10 October 2001. Initially known as "David Witherstone", he appeared on the soap between 2001 and 2005. In 2010, Otway reprised the role in online spin-off Hollyoaks: Freshers. The character returned again on 13 January 2011 for two episodes.

== Casting ==
Otway was hired cast in the role of Bombhead in 2001 and producers hired him to appear in just six episodes. Thereafter, the role was expanded and Otway continued to appear until he became a permanent cast member. Otway made his first on-screen appearance as Bombhead during the episode broadcast on 10 October 2001.

== Development ==
A writer from the show's official website described Bombhead "previously loveably insane and unpredictable". They noted that the death of his mother changed Bombhead's characterisation completely. The assessed that he became a "lonely, confused and emotionally unstable" character. Bombhead is often used in the show's comedic stories as the character gets himself into funny situations. Otway told Claire Brand from Inside Soap that "Bombhead is loveable, but he is in his own little world half the time." He added that Bombhead is a "fun part to play" because he "is always doing something daft". Otway revealed that Bombhead's lack of seriousness sometimes made playing the part difficult to take seriously. He noted that the comedic stories that required him to appear as Bombhead without any underwear on was a prime example of this.

In July 2002, writers created an inappropriate crush story for Bombhead, when he falls in love with the older character Helen Cunningham (Kathryn George). His feelings develop after he attends the Jubilee celebration party where attendees wear period costumes. Bombhead accidentally sees Helen's underwear and becomes infatuated with her. Otway told Brand that his character really believes Helen flashed her underwear on purpose and is "completely hooked" on her. He becomes convinced Helen has sexual feelings for him too and tries to spend more time with her. He applies for a job at Helen's ironing business, Steam Team, believing she will obviously hire him because "she fancies him". Helen gives Bombhead the job because she deems him suitable, but presumes Helen is doing so to initiate a relationship. Otway explained his character's delusion as him wanting "to be around her all the time and he is convinced she feels the same way."

Helen's daughter Mandy Richardson (Sarah Jayne Dunn) realises that Bombhead is in love with Helen and warns her mother about his true intentions. Helen invites Bombhead to lunch to stop Bombhead's advances. Otway added that "Bombhead is convinced that Helen wants to tell him that she loves him." When they meet up, Helen tells Bombhead he is fired from working at Steam Team because he lacks the required experience. Bombhead does not believe her because of how his mind works. He "takes this completely the wrong way" as he perceives their conversation as being "filled with innuendo". Helen becomes annoyed with Bombhead's refusal to accept reality and attempts a more direct explanation, but his infatuation grows. Otway explained that Bombhead becomes convinced Helen is "playing hard to get" and is worried about leaving her husband, Gordon Cunningham (Bernard Latham). He added that Bombhead is not deterred by Helen's marriage and "was convinced her family weren't a problem". Helen is left with the dilemma of trying to stop Bombhead from pursuing her further. Otway revealed that he enjoyed working on the storyline with George and Latham because they were "both fantastic" during the story.

In 2010, Otway reprised the role in online spin-off series titled Hollyoaks: Freshers.

== Storylines ==
Bombhead was Lee Hunter's best friend, and was introduced into the series as a schoolfriend of Zara Morgan, Cameron Clark, Norman Sankofa, Abby Davies and Lee Hunter. Slightly odd, socially inept and occasionally stupid, but with a heart of gold, David frequently misunderstood other characters to comic effect. Bombhead liked to cook. He became somewhat of an apprentice to Tony Hutchinson, and worked in Il Gnosh. He was close friends with Gordon Cunningham, who was a father figure to him. He was devastated when Gordon and his wife, Helen, were killed in a car crash and briefly became a Christian.

When Bombhead's mother died, David suffered a mental breakdown. Unable to accept her death, he lived with her body and continued to act as if she were still alive, doing her dry cleaning and cooking her meals. David's only form of comfort during this time was a recurring hallucination of Gordon Cunningham, who would offer advice and try to convince Bombhead to accept what had happened and ask his friends for help. Cameron had noticed something was wrong with David and wanted to help him in return for Bombhead helping him when he attempted suicide. Cameron tried to get David to open up but he refused. David's mother's body was eventually discovered by his friend Lee. Lee had gone round to the house thinking it would be empty so he could have sex with his friend Stacey Foxx. Stacey sat down on Mrs Burke's body and screamed. Realising what had happened, Lee and his mother Sally convinced Bombhead to move in with the Hunters. After his mother's funeral, Bombhead stopped seeing visions of Mr Cunningham.

After his mother's death, Bombhead spent considerable time trying to track down his father, a person he only knew through letters his mother had hidden from him until her demise. After much effort, it became apparent that he would never succeed. It wasn't until Lee decided to hire a collection of clowns as a fundraising exercise for students at HCC that David would finally meet his father, a clown, of which ironically Bombhead had always suffered an irrational fear of. Bombhead's friendship with Lee would finally come to an end when Lee was turned against him by the evil machinations of Chris Fenwick, although once he found out what Chris was up to, Lee made up with Bombhead. David decided to leave Hollyoaks and join the circus to live with his father. Bombhead mattered so much to Lee that after Lee's hearing over diverting college funds, during which Chris used Bombhead's joining the circus against Lee, he punched Chris square in the face, saying, "This is for Bombhead".

In the spinoff Hollyoaks: Freshers, Lee called Bombhead to ask if he should propose to his girlfriend Leanne Holiday. Bombhead said since he loved her enough to try to retrieve the ring he had dropped down a portable toilet at a musical festival, then yes. Bombhead is seen on 13 January 2011 asking Amy Barnes where Lee & Leannes wedding is, he is there to be Lee's best man. After Amy reveals that Leanne wrote a fake letter in Amy's name, the wedding was ultimately called off. Leading Bombhead and Lee to hide in a wardrobe from Leanne. Bombhead talks to Amy about her relationship with Lee and how she didn't intend to break up Lee & Leanne, Bombhead helps Lee to get through the breakup and choose between Amy and Leanne by tossing a coin, Amy finds them doing this and is not impressed. He then returns home.

== Reception ==
For his performance as Bombhead, Lee Otway was nominated in the Best Actor and Best Dramatic Performance at the 2005 British Soap Awards.

Otway was nominated for a North West Comedy award in 2004 and 2005.

Otway was nominated for Best Actor at the 2004 National Television Awards.

Bombhead was nominated for the "Funniest Performance" accolade at the 2004 Inside Soap Awards.

A writer from Virgin Media opined that Bombhead was "nice but dim" and a "good-hearted joker" with a "morbid fear of clowns". They also considered him as one of the show's most popular characters.

Zoe Delaney from Daily Mirror stated that viewers "fondly remember the character" and his "loveable personality". She branded Bombhead as "hapless" with an "eccentric way of life" due to his many career changes. She added that Bombhead's "bromance" with Lee and his "charming ways" made him "quickly become a fan-favourite". Delaney concluded that viewers "hearts were broken" when Otway left the role. An Inside Soap critic praised Hollyoaks' return to a good "standard" in August 2002 due to story changes. They praised Bombhead stories with Helen, stating "we have loved Bombhead's hilarious crush on Helen."
