= Ben Davies (Hollyoaks) =

- Hollyoaks character
- Portrayed by: Marcus Patric
- Duration: 2000–2005
- First appearance: 14 August 2000
- Last appearance: 18 December 2006
- Introduced by: Jo Hallows
- Spin-off appearances: Hollyoaks: Indecent Behaviour (2001); Hollyoaks: Let Loose (2005); Hollyoaks: In the City (2006)
In-universe information
- Occupation: Bar owner
- Father: Will Davies
- Mother: Alison Davies
- Sisters: Abby Davies
- Wife: Izzy Cornwell
- Sons: Arthur Davies

Ben Davies is a fictional character from the British Channel 4 soap opera Hollyoaks, played by Marcus Patric. He first appeared in August 2000, and after departing from the main show in 2005, made further appearances in spin-offs, Hollyoaks: Let Loose and Hollyoaks: In the City, which followed his relationship with Lisa Hunter (Gemma Atkinson)

== Casting ==
Marcus Patric was cast in the Hollyoaks: On the Pull campaign to find new young actors to appear in the show during the London auditions where he was called back for further auditions in Liverpool and the role of Ben was created for him. The other three chosen were Andrew Somerville (Theo Sankofa), Lesley Johnston (Laura Burns) and Elize du Toit (Izzy Cornwell).

== Development ==
Writers created a relationship between Ben and Ellie Mills (Sarah Baxendale). The two characters were used to break a world record of the longest kiss featured in film, set by the Guinness Book of Records. The two characters kissed for a total of 3 minutes and 15 seconds. It broke the record previously set in 1941, from the comedy film You're in the Army Now. To achieve the record the characters take part in an event on National Kissing Day, hosted at their local nightclub The Loft. Baxendale told Emma Johnson from the Liverpool Echo that it took nearly five takes to film the kissing scenes. Hollyoaks held the title until 2013.

== Storylines ==
Ben arrived in the village and was a big hit as the hunky new fireman. Ben was an immediate hit with Mandy Richardson and Cindy Cunningham, although Mandy was a bit miffed when he brushed her off for Cindy. Ben instantly fell for Cindy Cunningham and his relationship with Cindy lasted until social services contacted her after reports that she had been mistreating her daughter, Holly. Cindy believed that Social Services wanted to put Holly with foster parents and decided to flee the country and run away to Spain. Ben helped Cindy by driving with her to the airport but on the way she accidentally ran over Anna Green.

After saying goodbye to Cindy, Ben returned to Hollyoaks Village. Nearly running her down again, Anna remembered that Ben had been in the car that knocked her down the first time. Ben tried to apologise to her but his apologies fell on deaf ears. However, he proved to be a good friend to Anna when she was pregnant and the two shared a bond.

Ben soon turned his attentions to Mandy Richardson, even though he knew that his best friend Luke Morgan wanted her back. Despite his affair with Mandy, Ben proved to be a vital friend to Luke, helping him get over his rape ordeal. However, when Luke found out about Mandy and Ben he was devastated and felt betrayed, leaving the guilty pair to reconsider their future. Ben and Luke had not been on good terms when Luke tried to muscle in on the running of Mandy's business, which he had invested in. However, Ben was rather jealous of this and told Mandy that she should just pay Luke back all of his money and tell Luke to leave the business alone. Eventually, Ben and Luke made up when they saw Adam Morgan's Game 4 It video and realised how ridiculous their disagreement was.

Ben soon grew tired of Mandy’s impetuous behaviour and reverted to being a ‘lad about town’. Ben embarked on a tempestuous on/off relationship with Izzy Cornwell after rescuing her from the clutches of Scott Anderson. The pair frequently wound each other up. Despite many attempts to sleep with Izzy, Ben failed. Ben’s character had turned into a sex maniac and pulled anything with a pulse. He had a brief relationship with Ellie but the relationship never seemed to go anywhere and soon Ben was to face a tough challenge in his life.

During a Potholing Trip there was a rock fall that left Theo Sankofa and Jamie Nash dead. Ben felt responsible for Jamie's death as he had acted incorrectly when attempting to save Jamie's life, even though he had extensive life saving experience with the fire department. These actions had probably resulted in Jamie's death. The experience left Ben devastated, but both his father Will and sister Abby helped him get over the tragedy and Ben also found support from Izzy.

Just as Ben seemed to be getting his life back on track, his dad's police colleague, Dale Jackson, moved in with the Davies household. Ben hated the idea of another woman in the house, knowing that his father, Will, fancied her and sister Abby thought Dale was like a mother figure. However, Ben soon succumbed to Dale’s charms and ended up in bed with her. After trying to forget his feelings, Ben failed and again slept with her only to be caught by his father. Feeling guilty, Ben was surprised at his father's reaction who refused to get involved. Ben soon learnt his lesson with Dale when she made another attempt to get together with him, this time resulting in a final rejection and her departure from Hollyoaks. Ben realised the true love of his life was Izzy, but found it difficult to tell her and she left for a trip around the world.

Instead Ben turned his attentions to Dale's Emma Chambers and after a one-night stand, Ben still knew that Izzy was the one for him. When she returned from abroad Ben initially appeared uninterested but after Izzy was involved in a minor accident he proposed to her at the hospital. She accepted but was unaware that Emma was now pregnant with Ben's child, a secret he strove to keep from her. The night before their wedding Scott Anderson told Izzy about Emma's pregnancy but she decided to go ahead with the wedding, much to Ben's relief. The marriage was not to last as Izzy found it hard to cope with the birth of Ben's child Arthur, and after finding out that she was unable to have children, Izzy decided to end their marriage by sleeping with Scott Anderson, Ben's enemy. Despite this Ben decided to forgive her, but Izzy was adamant that the marriage was over and left him.

More struggle was to follow for Ben when he lost his best friend Dan Hunter who died in a rally car explosion. After this Dan's younger sister, Lisa, grew closer to Ben and the pair shared a kiss. However, Ben was adamant that their relationship would not work because of their age gap. Lisa then began an affair with her brother's friend Jake Dean, who was dating Ben's friend Becca Hayton. Jake confessed the affair to Becca and told her she was the only woman he wanted. Jake turned to Ben for help to win Becca back and was even there when Jake proposed to Becca in the village. Ben would serve as Jake's best man at the wedding. Meanwhile, another fling was on the cards for Ben as he dated Louise Summers but he still could not fight his feelings for Lisa. Eventually, Ben dumped Louise and began to date Lisa. When the pair confirmed their relationship publicly a few people were shocked including the Hunter family. As the relationship went from strength to strength, Ben and Lisa decided to move away together and the pair said farewell to Hollyoaks.

Ben and Lisa then went to live in the big city and crossed over into their own spin off show Hollyoaks: Let Loose. They later crossed over in a second spin off Hollyoaks: In The City arriving in Liverpool and staying with Ben's friend Tanktop (Leon Lopez). Ben lost his savings to a con man and then worked as a doorman in a nightclub for Burton Phillips (Lee Warburton) while Lisa became a model. Their relationship started to deteriorate and they later broke up. Ben then started to date Lisa's friend and fellow model Polly. In the last few episodes Ben started to regret his split with Lisa and tried to get back together with her but Lisa didn't want to resume their relationship. She then got kidnapped by her new employer Stella. Ben sped to her rescue when he discovered Lisa's abduction and Stella's plans to use her in a snuff film, however, Stella's conscience got the better of her and she freed Lisa who, during a scuffle grabbed one of Stella's henchman's gun, when Ben burst into the room to rescue her she accidentally shot him, killing him. As the police arrive and arrest Stella and her gang, a distraught Lisa cradles Ben's body in her arms as Tanktop and Burton look on.

== Reception ==
Virgin Media profiled Ben, of him a writer stated: "Ben's daredevil dayjob as a firefighter certainly helped him with his high strike rate of pneumatic blondes." They also brand him as having a "easygoing nature" which is often offset by girlfriend Lisa. A columnist for LGBT website AfterElton observed Ben as being popular with females from his inception. They added that initially anyone would have wanted Ben to rescue to them from a fire but "sadly he lost his way and turned into a bit of a sex maniac". In 2003, Ben was nominated as "Best TV Pubgoer" in a poll run by Blackthorn Cider. In 2018, Catriona Rigney from OK! called Ben a "DISHY fireman" who "REALLY got hearts racing when he first appeared in the soap", as well as noting that he was "popular" and "a huge hit with viewers". Di Hollingsworth from Soaplife included Ben and Cindy's hit and run incident involving Anna in their list of top ten soap storylines in which characters get away with committing crimes. Writers from All About Soap assessed that Ben and Izzy "used to row all the time" and that their engagement "hasn't changed a thing". They quipped "they have trouble saying hello without snarling at one another." When Gordon Cunningham (Bernard Latham) and Helen Cunningham (Kathryn George) were killed off in a car crash storyline, Lucy Lather from Inside Soap wished that producers had also killed off Ben and Izzy "while they were at it".
