= Kelly Condron =

British television and voice actress

- Born: Kelly Greenwood; 1982 (age 43–44); Salford, England
- Occupation: Actress
- Years active: 1997–present
- Known for: Hollyoaks
- Spouse: Adam Condron (m. 2006)
- Website: kellycondron.co.uk

Kelly Condron (née Greenwood) is a British television and voice actress. She is known for her role as Zara Morgan in the Channel 4 soap opera Hollyoaks (1999–2005, 2021–2023).

== Career ==
Condron grew up in Salford in the 1980s and decided she wanted to act from age twelve. She began taking acting lessons and the following year she secured the role of Geri in the ITV show Children's Ward.

In 1999, Condron secured the regular role of Zara Morgan, in the British soap opera Hollyoaks. In July 2005, it was reported that producers would not be renewing the contracts of several cast members, including Condron. She soon filmed her final scenes with the show.

In 2007, Condron was approached by the production company Endemol to provide voice overs for one of their reality television shows. The experience led Condron to take up voice over work as her new career.

She has also had roles in the television series My Wonderful Life, Casualty and Heartbeat. In 2021, Condron rejoined the cast of Hollyoaks as Zara on a regular basis.

In June 2023, Condron left Hollyaks again in a storyline which saw Zara go to Borneo to follow her dreams of working in a nature sanctuary.

== Filmography ==
Year	Title	Role	Notes
1998	Children's Ward	Geri	Recurring role
1998	The Cops	Underage girl	Guest role
1999	Heartbeat	Julie Hepponstall	Guest role
1999	My Wonderful Life	Tracey	Recurring role
1999–2005, 2021–2023	Hollyoaks	Zara Morgan	Regular role
2005	Hollyoaks: Crossing the Line	Zara Morgan	Regular role
2007	The Innocence Project	Julie Poppat	Guest role
2007	Casualty	Zoe Riley	Guest role
2009	Shameless	Baby Stella	Voice over
2009	The Street	Lynette	Guest role
2010	Casualty	Kimberly Marshall	Guest role
2024	Gobstopper	Trish	Short film
