= Jonathan Le Billon =

British actor (born 1980)

- Born: Jonathan Keith Le Billon; 20 September 1980 (age 46); Lindley, Huddersfield, West Yorkshire, England
- Occupation: Actor
- Years active: 1993–present

Jonathan Keith Le Billon (born 20 September 1980) is a British-born actor known for working in feature films, television shows and performing with classical theatre companies.

== Background ==
Jonathan Le Billon was born in Huddersfield, West Yorkshire. He trained in dance and drama before studying acting at the Bristol Old Vic Theatre School from 2004 to 2007.

He began his professional acting career at age 13.

== Early career ==
Le Billon's first television appearance was in 1997, in a guest role on the ITV series Heartbeat. This was followed by guest roles in: City Central (BBC) and Cold Feet (Granada). His first leading role was in the Renaissance season of How We Used to Live playing the role of Tom Byngham, after which he returned to college to graduate.

Following on from this, Le Billon took leading roles in the Channel 4 show Hollyoaks, and the Emmy nominated series At Home with the Braithwaites, and between the two, shot over 100 episodes of series television from 1998 through 2001. He also toured for a year with the Northern Broadsides theatre company before gaining a coveted place on the 3 yr B.A. course at the Bristol Old Vic Theatre School.

At drama school Le Billon played several roles, including 'Jaques' in the school's international tour of As You Like It. He graduated with a B.A. in July 2007, and after graduation, worked for the Northcott Theatre, Exeter, on their National tour of Richard III (2008), receiving a notable mention for his performance in the role of 'Catesby'. He was then used as 'Robert Juet' in the New York run of the play River of Tides (2009).

== Early work in the U.S. ==
In 2010, Le Billon took roles in two film projects: Casting Shadows (2011), an adaptation of a Korean folk tale, and the feature film Bright in the Dark (2011). He was also cast for the title role in the Lewis Family Playhouse’s production of The Gingerbread Man. A significant boost to his profile came with a role opposite Oscar-nominated actor Robert Loggia in the feature film The Apostle Peter (2012), as well as several international commercial campaigns, including as spokesperson for Corning Glassware.

Le Billon also continued with theatrical works, appearing in stage productions of: Amadeus, The Chronicles of Narnia and as 'The Engineer' in Miss Saigon (all for the San Bernardino Playhouse). Physical theatre projects included the technically challenging roles of Vaslav Nijinsky in Eleanor Antin's Before the Revolution (Billy Wilder Theatre), and 'The Creature' in Theatrical Arts International's production of Nick Dear's Frankenstein (2014). Le Billon continued working for the San Bernardino Playhouse until 2016

== Return to the UK. Producing and work as Sherlock Holmes ==
Le Billon returned to the UK in 2017 after working in Venice, Italy. Following further year contracts in Windsor and London, Le Billon moved to London and set up 'Wednesday Night Playreaders', a group dedicated to reading the complete works of Shakespeare. This group (and Le Billon as producer) were used as the basis for a production of 'Venus & Adonis' with 'The Society for Theatre Research' and served as the inspiration for the lockdown online play-reading company 'The Show Must Go Online'. It additionally re-connected Le Billon to Tron writer and Sherlock Holmes author Bonnie MacBird, with whom Le Billon had worked in Los Angeles. The two worked together numerous times on Sherlock Holmes projects (Le Billon as Holmes, MacBird as producer/director) in tandem with the releases of MacBird's books. In 2021 Le Billon played Sherlock Holmes in an online production of 'The Blue Carbuncle' for 'The Sherlock Holmes Society of London', produced by Bonnie MacBird.

== Filmography ==
=== Television ===
- How We Used to Live (1 episode, 1996) as Tom Byngham
- Heartbeat (1 episode, 1998) as Rickie
- City Central (1 episode, 1999) as Kyle Hooper
- Cold Feet (2 episodes, 2000) as Student Three
- At Home with the Braithwaites (14 episodes, 2000–2001) as Kieran
- Hollyoaks (109 episodes, 2001–2003) as Brian Drake
