= Carley Stenson =

English actress and singer

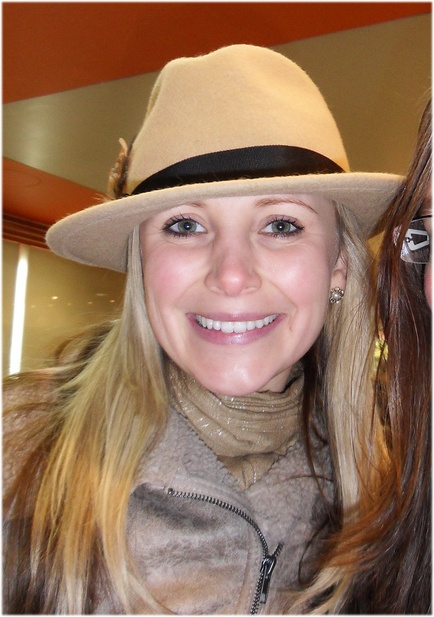
- Stenson in 2011
- Born: 22 September 1982 (age 43); Wigan, Greater Manchester, England
- Occupations: Actress; singer
- Years active: 2000–present
- Television: Hollyoaks; Doctors; Dancing on Ice
- Spouse: Danny Mac (m. 2017)
- Children: 2

Carley Stenson (born 22 September 1982) is an English actress and singer. She is known for her roles as Steph Cunningham in the Channel 4 soap opera Hollyoaks and Harriet Shelton in the BBC soap opera Doctors. For her role as Steph, she received numerous nominations at the British Soap Awards.

Stenson left Hollyoaks in 2010 to focus on musical theatre acting and has since played roles such as Elle Woods in Legally Blonde: The Musical and Fantine in Les Misérables. In 2023, she competed in the fifteenth series of Dancing on Ice.

== Early and personal life ==
Stenson was born on 22 September 1982 in Billinge Higher End, Wigan. As a child, she competed in talent competitions hosted by the St Helens Star. Whilst starring in Legally Blonde: The Musical, she met actor Danny Mac. The pair began dating in 2011, and got married in 2017. In March 2021, the pair announced that they were expecting their first child together. She gave birth to a daughter in June 2021. Followed by a second child in April 2024.

== Career ==
Stenson auditioned for the Channel 4 soap opera Hollyoaks, for the role of a friend of the character Zara Morgan (Kelly Greenwood). The audition was successful, but the casting team told her to audition for the role of Steph Cunningham instead, which she received. Stenson joined the cast after leaving secondary school, aged 17. In 2010, she announced that she would be leaving to pursue musical theatre. She recorded versions of "If I Could Turn Back Time" and "About You Now", both of which were featured in separate episodes of Hollyoaks to coincide with the death of her character.

Stenson's theatre work has included London West End theatre appearances as Princess Fiona in Shrek: The Musical; Elle Woods in Legally Blonde: The Musical; and as The Lady of The Lake in Spamalot. In 2015, she independently released a self-titled extended play. Stenson then played Christine Colgate in the 2015 to 2016 UK tour of Dirty Rotten Scoundrels, as well as Fantine in Les Misérables. In April 2021, she joined the cast of the BBC soap opera Doctors as Harriet Shelton. She appeared until September 2021. In 2022, it was announced that Stenson would be competing in the fifteenth series of Dancing on Ice. Partnered with Mark Hanretty, the pair finished in sixth place.

== Filmography ==
Year	Title	Role	Notes
2000–2011	Hollyoaks	Steph Cunningham	Series regular
2008–2009	Hollyoaks Later	Steph Cunningham	Series regular
2014	Suspects	Tracey Gatting	2 episodes
2016	Holby City	Lucy Parker	Episode: "Indefensible"
2021	Doctors	Harriet Shelton	Recurring role
2023	Dancing on Ice	Herself	Contestant; sixth place

== Discography ==
Title	Details
Carley	Released: 6 July 2015; Format: Digital download, streaming

== Awards and nominations ==
Year	Award	Category	Nominated work	Result	Ref.
2005	British Soap Awards	Best Comedy Performance	Hollyoaks	Nominated	
2006	British Soap Awards	Best Comedy Performance	Hollyoaks	Nominated	
2007	Hollyoaks End-of-year Awards	Favourite Couple (with Matt Littler	Hollyoaks	Won	
2009	British Soap Awards	Best Actress	Hollyoaks	Nominated	
2009	British Soap Awards	Best Dramatic Performance	Hollyoaks	Nominated	
2011	British Soap Awards	Best Exit	Hollyoaks	Nominated	
2012	All About Soap Awards	Best Comeback	Hollyoaks	Nominated	
2012	The Imperial Performing Arts Awards	Pride of St Helens	Herself	Won	
2012	What's on TV	Soap's Greatest Legend	Hollyoaks	Nominated	
