= John Graham Davies =

Canadian-British actor and writer

John Graham Davies is a Canadian-British actor and writer, most famous for playing Les Hunter in the soap-opera Hollyoaks from 2001 to 2005.

During his early career, Graham Davies was a member of the Canadian National Theater, appearing in Troilus and Cressida, Camino Real and touring nationally in Hamlet. He was in the original cast of John Godber's 1983 play Bouncers. He worked at a number of theatres in the 1980s and 1990s, including Leeds Playhouse, where he played John Proctor in Arthur Miller's The Crucible, as well as the Sheffield Crucible Theatre, Nottingham Playhouse, Swan Theatre, Worcester and the Manchester Library Theatre, and with various political theatre companies, including 7:84 England.

From the late 1980s, he started working mainly in television, and he has appeared in Coronation Street in 1989 and 2000, Alan Bleasdale's GBH, Emmerdale, Brookside, Heartbeat in 1999 and Cracker in 1993, as well as other TV dramas and soaps, including Floodtide, Harry, and The Chief. He appeared in the Granada TV exposé of the framing of the Birmingham Six, Who Bombed Birmingham?, and in the BBC play Reasonable Force, about the killing of Blair Peach.

From 1996 to 1998, Graham Davies played DCI Peter Adams alongside Patricia Routledge in the BBC's Hetty Wainthropp Investigates, and also played a police officer in Jimmy McGovern's acclaimed drama about the Hillsborough disaster, as well as appearing in Cold Feet and COPS. Graham Davies played Myra Hindley's QC, Godfrey Heilpern, in the ITV drama See No Evil: The Moors Murders, opposite Maxine Peake, as well as numerous other one-off appearances in The Bill, Casualty and Casualty 1909. In 2014, he appeared in Coronation Street, playing the judge in the Peter Barlow trial. During the 1980s, Graham Davies was a regular voice in Radio 4 drama.

In the late 1990s, his one-man play, Taking Sides, based on his experiences taking aid convoys to Bosnia, was performed internationally and broadcast by the BBC World Service. Another radio play, Huskar, was broadcast on BBC Radio 4 in 2003.

Graham Davies occasionally taught creative writing at the University of Bolton, and drama at Liverpool John Moores University for some years.

In Spring 2009, Graham Davies' play Beating Berlusconi, based on Liverpool FC's 2005 UEFA Champions League victory over A.C. Milan, began touring across venues on Merseyside, including the Unity Theatre in Liverpool, and has subsequently toured internationally, with a Norwegian production opening in the autumn of 2011. It has also been published in Italian.

Unsung, co-written by James Quinn, about the blind 19th-century abolitionist Edward Rushton, premiered at the Liverpool Everyman in 2015, co-produced by DaDaFest and Turf Love.

== Political views and controversies ==
Davies is an active member of Liverpool Friends of Palestine, and a signatory of the Artists for Palestine pledge not to work in Israel.

A member and former branch chairman of St Michael's branch of the Labour Party in Liverpool Riverside CLP, Davies was twice suspended from the party after advocating for Palestine online, firstly in April 2019. After being re-admitted in July that year, he was again suspended in 2020 and subsequently left the Party.
