= Lee Otway =

English actor

- Born: 4 January 1982 (age 44); Bradford, West Yorkshire, England
- Occupation: Actor
- Years active: 1994–present

Lee Otway (born 4 January 1982) is an English actor best known for his role as David "Bombhead" Burke in the British television drama Hollyoaks, for which he was nominated for four British Soap Awards. In 2023, he appeared in season 6 of The Crown, playing royal bodyguard Kez Wingfield in five episodes. In 2024, Otway appeared in Meet the Richardsons. In 2025, Otway appeared in Tinsel Town by Sky Cinema. Otway also played Ben West in the BBC drama The Syndicate. He had previously appeared in the ITV drama Heartbeat and in 2019 appeared in the BBC drama Doctors.
