= Andrew McNair (actor) =

English actor (born 1979)

- Born: 15 June 1979 (age 46); London
- Occupation: Actor
- Years active: 2001–present

Andrew Robert McNair (born 15 June 1979) is an English actor, probably best known for his role on Channel 4 soap opera Hollyoaks.

== Career ==
McNair began his television career in 2001 on Channel 4's Hollyoaks. He played the role of mechanic Dan Hunter for three years, appearing at the very centre of many of the show's most high-profile storylines, until he quit the show in 2004. Andy McNair made his final appearance as Dan in December 2004, which his character was killed off in a car explosion.

Following his Hollyoaks departure, McNair appeared in a number of small roles on television, including established series such as Casualty, Dream Team and Doctors among others.

In 2009, Andy joined the third season of Showtime series The Tudors, playing Thomas Seymour. The show is based on the reign of English monarch Henry VIII. He also appeared on BBC drama Waterloo Road as a drug dealer called Darren.
