= Alex Carter (British actor) =

English actor and writer

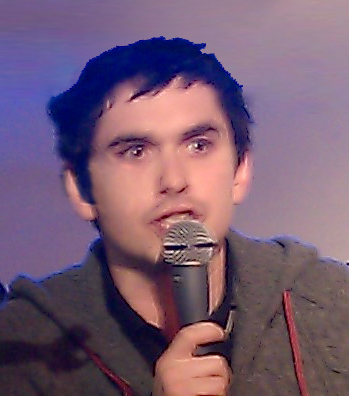
- Alex Carter in 2011
- Born: 7 May 1982 (age 44); Oldham, England
- Occupations: Actor and writer
- Height: 5 ft 8 in (1.73 m)

Alex Carter (born 7 May 1982 in Oldham, Greater Manchester) is an English actor and writer, mostly known for his roles as Jamie Hope in Emmerdale and Lee Hunter in Hollyoaks.

== Early life ==
Carter's brother Bruce is in a band called The Whip. Both brothers attended the Blue Coat School, Oldham.

A lifelong fan of Oldham Athletic A.F.C., Carter presented the Saturday afternoon sports programme Latics Live on The Revolution between 2008 and 2011.

== Life and career ==
After playing Greeny in CITV show Adam's Family Tree, in 1999 Carter was cast as Craig Harrison in Sunday evening drama Where the Heart Is. He then joined the cast of Hollyoaks as Lee Hunter, staying for four years before his character left to embark on an around the world tour. He then joined the ITV soap Emmerdale on 16 February 2006 as Jamie Hope. On 8 February 2010, whilst appearing on Shaun Keaveny's breakfast show on BBC 6 Music, he announced that he was leaving Emmerdale after four years. On 15 March 2010 it was confirmed that after a five-year hiatus, Carter was returning to Hollyoaks.

In 2011, Carter appeared in BBC Three comedy How Not to Live Your Life as Blake; Don's Boss. In August 2012 he became a series regular in In with the Flynns on BBC1 as Kevin Flynn, younger brother to Will Mellor's Liam Flynn. In 2013, Carter starred in the Sky special Love Matters, written by Isy Suttie. and the period ITV costume drama Downton Abbey as Walter in Series Four of the show.

In early 2015, he starred in the Comedy Central show Give Out Girls as Steve and in late 2015 he was cast as series regular PC Lino Moretti in the new BBC1 Police series Cuffs set in Brighton. In 2016, Alex joined the cast of BBC's So Awkward as form tutor Mr Malone. In 2018 he began appearing as Ray Monk in the TV series Dark Heart, on ITV.
