= List of Hollyoaks characters =

Hollyoaks is a British television soap opera first broadcast on Channel 4 on 23 October 1995. The following is a list of characters who currently appear in the programme, listed in order of first appearance. In the case that more than one actor has portrayed a character, the current actor portraying the character is listed first.

== Present characters ==
=== Regular characters ===
| Character | Actor(s) | Duration | Ref(s) |
|---|---|---|---|
| Tony Hutchinson | Nick Pickard | 1995–present | |
| Cindy Cunningham | Stephanie Waring | 1995–2000, 2004, 2008–2024, 2026–present | |
| Cindy Cunningham | Laura Crossley | 1995–2000, 2004, 2008–2024, 2026–present | |
| Beth Keane | Rebecca Ryan | 1996–1997, 2004, 2026–present | |
| Beth Keane | Danielle Calvert | 1996–1997, 2004, 2026–present | |
| Beth Keane | Uncredited | 1996–1997, 2004, 2026–present | |
| Jack Osborne | Jimmy McKenna | 1996–present | |
| Darren Osborne | Ashley Taylor Dawson | 1996–1997, 1999–2000, 2003–present | |
| Darren Osborne | Adam Booth | 1996–1997, 1999–2000, 2003–present | |
| Nancy Hayton | Jessica Fox | 2005–present | |
| Ste Hay | Kieron Richardson | 2006–present | |
| Myra McQueen | Nicole Barber-Lane | 2006–2019, 2024–present | |
| Mercedes McQueen | Jennifer Metcalfe | 2006–present | |
| Warren Fox | Jamie Lomas | 2006–2011, 2016–present | |
| Leah Barnes | Charlotte Alex Riley | 2007–2024, 2026–present | |
| Leah Barnes | Ela-May Demircan | 2007–2024, 2026–present | |
| Leah Barnes | Jessica Croft-Lane | 2007–2024, 2026–present | |
| Leah Barnes | Magic Hurst | 2007–2024, 2026–present | |
| Theresa McQueen | Jorgie Porter | 2008–2016, 2020–2022, 2024–present | |
| Lucas Hay | Oscar Curtis | 2009–2019, 2021–present | |
| Lucas Hay | William Hall | 2009–2019, 2021–present | |
| Lucas Hay | Reuben Thwaites | 2009–2019, 2021–present | |
| Lucas Hay | Jude Hawley | 2009–2019, 2021–present | |
| Kathleen-Angel McQueen | Naledi Rapotu | 2010−2016, 2021–2022, 2024–present | |
| Kathleen-Angel McQueen | Kiara Mellor | 2010−2016, 2021–2022, 2024–present | |
| Kathleen-Angel McQueen | Nieve Grandison | 2010−2016, 2021–2022, 2024–present | |
| Liberty Savage | Jessamy Stoddart | 2010–2013, 2018–2022, 2024–present | |
| Liberty Savage | Abi Phillips | 2010–2013, 2018–2022, 2024–present | |
| Frankie Osborne | Isabelle Smith | 2011, 2024–present | |
| Frankie Osborne | Lexi | 2011, 2024–present | |
| Dodger Savage | Danny Mac | 2011–2015, 2025–present | |
| Sienna Blake | Anna Passey | 2012–present | |
| Ro Hutchinson | Leo Cole | 2013–2020, 2023–present | |
| Ro Hutchinson | Ava Webster | 2013–2020, 2023–present | |
| Ro Hutchinson | Isla Pritchard | 2013–2020, 2023–present | |
| Ro Hutchinson | Mollie Doherty | 2013–2020, 2023–present | |
| Ro Hutchinson | Mia Rae | 2013–2020, 2023–present | |
| Anthony Hutchinson | Brook Debio | 2013–2020, 2023–present | |
| Anthony Hutchinson | William Thompson | 2013–2020, 2023–present | |
| Anthony Hutchinson | Caelan Cobbledick-Manning | 2013–2020, 2023–present | |
| Anthony Hutchinson | Alfie Haughton | 2013–2020, 2023–present | |
| Dee Dee Hutchinson | Chloe Atkinson | 2013–2020, 2023–present | |
| Dee Dee Hutchinson | Lacey Findlow | 2013–2020, 2023–present | |
| Dee Dee Hutchinson | Lily Harrington | 2013–2020, 2023–present | |
| Dee Dee Hutchinson | Annabelle and Charlotte White | 2013–2020, 2023–present | |
| Leela Lomax | Kirsty-Leigh Porter | 2013–present | |
| Cleo McQueen | Nadine Mulkerrin | 2015–2022, 2024–present | |
| James Nightingale | Gregory Finnegan | 2016–present | |
| Goldie McQueen | Chelsee Healey | 2016–present | |
| Prince McQueen | Malique Thompson-Dwyer | 2016–2019, 2021–present | |
| Misbah Maalik | Harvey Virdi | 2017–present | |
| Imran Maalik | Ijaz Rana | 2017–2023, 2026–present | |
| Pearl Anderson | Dawn Hope | 2021–present | |
| Vicky Grant | Anya Lawrence | 2022–present | |
| Donny Clark | Louis Emerick | 2024–present | |
| Gemma Johnson | Tisha Merry | 2025–present | |
| Jonah Keane | Matthew Wolfenden | 2026–present | |
| Caleb Keane | Lewis Walton | 2026–present | |
| Maddox Keane | Sam Meyer | 2026–present | |
| Abigail Matthews | Brooke Vincent | 2026–present | |

=== Recurring and guest characters ===
| Character | Actor(s) | Duration | Ref(s) |
|---|---|---|---|
| Oscar Osborne | Noah Holdsworth | 2012–2020, 2022–present | |
| Oscar Osborne | Ralph and Zack Norman | 2012–2020, 2022–present | |
| Myra-Pocahontas Savage-McQueen | Naeve Mullen | 2014–2016, 2024–present | |
| Myra-Pocahontas Savage-McQueen | Uncredited | 2014–2016, 2024–present | |
| Daniel Lomax | Sebastien Tensel | 2016–2020, 2023–present | |
| Daniel Lomax | Kyzo-dré Murphy | 2016–2020, 2023–present | |
| Sophie Blake | Scarlett Kerr | 2017, 2019–2020, 2022–present | |
| Sophie Blake | Daisy Parsonage | 2017, 2019–2020, 2022–present | |
| Sophie Blake | Phoebe | 2017, 2019–2020, 2022–present | |
| Sophie Blake | Rubie Graham | 2017, 2019–2020, 2022–present | |
| Sophie Blake | Lottie and Laylie | 2017, 2019–2020, 2022–present | |
| Sebastian Blake | Teddie Williamson | 2017−2020, 2022–present | |
| Sebastian Blake | Elliott Parsonage | 2017−2020, 2022–present | |
| Sebastian Blake | Eric | 2017−2020, 2022–present | |
| Sebastian Blake | Rorie Graham | 2017−2020, 2022–present | |
| Sebastian Blake | Oakley and Ocean | 2017−2020, 2022–present | |
| Tori Devine-Banks | Harriet O'Shea | 2018, 2025–present | |
| Tori Devine-Banks | Uncredited | 2018, 2025–present | |
| Faith Hudson-Savage | Lottie Tatton | 2020–present | |
| Faith Hudson-Savage | Elsie and Lyla | 2020–present | |
| Faith Hudson-Savage | Uncredited | 2020–present | |
| Eva Hutchinson | Aubrey Burgess | 2021–present | |
| Eva Hutchinson | Uncredited | 2021–present | |
| Morgan Osborne | Lottie-Rose Mulhall | 2022–present | |
| Morgan Osborne | Penelope | 2022–present | |
| Maria-Carmella McQueen | Uncredited | 2024–present | |
| Maria-Gabriella Fox-McQueen | Uncredited | 2024–present | |
| Clara Dexter | Uncredited | 2024–present | |
| Joseph Dexter-McQueen | Noah | 2025–present | |
| Trina | Sadie Williams | 2025–present | |
| Xander Frost | Indigo Kamal-Poole | 2026–present | |

== Cast changes ==
=== Returning characters ===
| Character | Actor(s) | Ref(s) |
|---|---|---|
| Zoe Anderson | Garcia Brown | |

=== Future characters ===
| Character | Actor(s) | Ref(s) |
|---|---|---|
| Chantelle McQueen | Amy Du Quesne | |

== Former characters ==
=== 1990s ===
==== Last appeared in 1996 ====
| Character | Actor(s) | Duration |
|---|---|---|
| Tom Jenkins | Charles Youlten | 1995–1996 |
| Dermot Ashton | Lauren Beales | 1996 |
| Terry Williams | Ian Puleston-Davies | 1995–1996 |
| Vinnie Williams | Tim Dantay | 1996 |
| Louise Taylor | Brett O'Brien | 1995–1996 |
| Jane Andersen | Sally Faulkner | 1995–1996 |
| Natasha Andersen | Shebah Ronay | 1995–1996 |
| Sarah Andersen | Anna Martland | 1995–1996 |
| Greg Andersen | Alvin Stardust | 1995–1996 |

==== Last appeared in 1997 ====
| Character | Actor(s) | Duration |
|---|---|---|
| Dawn Cunningham | Lisa Williamson | 1995–1997 |
| Bazil McCourtey | Toby Sawyer | 1995–1997 |
| Spike | Jack Deam | 1997 |
| Ollie Benson | Paul Leyshon | 1995–1997 |
| Lee Stanley | Nathan Valente | 1996–1997 |
| Jeff Bolton | Stephen MacKenna | 1996–1997 |
| Maddie Parker | Yasmin Bannerman | 1995–1997 |
| Lisa Bolton | Isabel Murphy | 1997 |
| Emily Bolton | Beth MacDonald | 1996–1997 |
| Jake Bolton | Luke Henwood | 1996–1997 |
| Anita Groves | Tara Moran | 1997 |
| Celia Osborne | Carol Noakes | 1996–1997 |
| Susi Harrison | Deborah Chad | 1996–1997 |
| Michael St John Thomas | Tom Hudson | 1996–1997 |

==== Last appeared in 1999 ====
| Character | Actor(s) | Duration |
|---|---|---|
| Rob Hawthorne | Warren DeRosa | 1996–1999 |
| Kerri | Sarah Vandenbergh | 1999 |
| Joe Johnson | James McKenzie Robinson | 1999 |
| Jasmine Bates | Elly Fairman | 1998–1999 |
| Wayne Clark | James Corden | 1998–1999 |
| Juliette Benson | Martine Brown | 1995–1999 |
| Kirk Benson | James Quinn | 1995–1999 |
| Ty | Garry Grant | 1999 |
| Kevin Daniels | Robert Weatherby | 1995–1999 |
| Sash Marwan | Mark Arends | 1997–1998 |
| Janice Bolton | Debbie Arnold | 1996–1998 |

=== 2000s ===
==== Last appeared in 2000 ====
| Character | Actor(s) | Duration |
|---|---|---|
| Lorraine Wilson | Jo-Anne Knowles | 2000 |
| Kate Patrick | Natasha Symms | 1997–2000 |
| Eric Finnigan | Peter Alexander | 1998, 2000 |
| Eric Finnigan | Philip Bretherton | 1998, 2000 |
| Jill Osborne | Lynda Rooke | 1997–2000 |
| Sam Smallwood | Tim Downie | 1999–2000 |
| Nikki Sullivan | Wendy Glenn | 1999–2000 |
| Sean Tate | Daniel Pape | 1997–2000 |
| Dan Sanders | Joseph May | 1999–2000 |
| Lucy Benson | Kerrie Taylor | 1995–2000 |

==== Last appeared in 2001 ====
| Character | Actor(s) | Duration |
|---|---|---|
| Jason Cunliffe | Alex Thorne | 2001 |
| Geri Hudson | Joanna Taylor | 1999–2001 |
| Jacqui Hudson | Julie Peasgood | 1999–2001 |
| Bob Bridges | Peter Faulkner | 2001 |
| Lewis Richardson | Ben Hull | 1995–2001 |
| Mrs. Green | Hazel McBride | 2000–2001 |
| Emily Taylor | Lorna Pegler | 1998–2001 |
| Gina Patrick | Dannielle Brent | 1997–2001 |
| Taylor James | Michael Price | 2000–2001 |
| Sol Patrick | Paul Danan | 1997–2001 |
| Jess Holt | Frankie Hough | 2000–2001 |
| Jess Holt | Abbie Pethullis | 2000–2001 |

==== Last appeared in 2002 ====
| Character | Actor(s) | Duration |
|---|---|---|
| Laura Burns | Lesley Crawford | 2000–2002 |
| Anna Green | Lisa M. Kay | 1999–2002 |
| Jamie Nash | Stefan Booth | 2001–2002 |
| Theo Sankofa | Andrew Somerville | 2001–2002 |
| Beth Morgan | Kate Baines | 1999–2002 |
| Beth Morgan | Elizabeth O'Grady | 1999–2002 |
| Andy Morgan | Ross Davidson | 1999–2002 |
| Eve Crawford | Natasha Lund | 2001–2002 |
| Alex Bell | Martino Lazzeri | 1999–2002 |
| Reverend Green | Bernard Holley | 2000, 2002 |
| Alyson | Sarah Jayne Steed | 2001–2002 |
| Dion | Gary Webster | 2001–2002 |

==== Last appeared in 2003 ====
| Character | Actor(s) | Duration |
|---|---|---|
| Lillian Hunter | Judith Barker | 2002–2003 |
| Roger Cornwell | Anthony Smee | 2002, 2003 |
| Jodie Nash | Kate McEnery | 2001–2003 |
| Toby Mills | Henry Luxemburg | 2001–2003 |
| D.I. Dale Jackson | Laila Rouass | 2003 |
| Adam Morgan | David Brown | 1999–2003 |
| Linda Mills | Wendy Roe | 2003 |
| Dennis Richardson | David McAllister | 1997–1998, 2003 |
| Roxy Maguire | Harriet Green | 2003 |
| Brian Drake | Jonathan Le Billon | 2001–2003 |

==== Last appeared in 2004 ====
| Character | Actor(s) | Duration |
|---|---|---|
| Dan Hunter | Andrew McNair | 2001–2004 |
| Jambo Bolton | Will Mellor | 1995–1998, 2004 |
| James Walker | O. T. Fagbenle | 2004 |
| Gordon Cunningham | Bernard Latham | 1996–2004 |
| Nick O'Connor | Darren Bransford | 2001–2004 |
| Alison Davies | Natalie Forbes | 2003–2004 |
| Norman Sankofa | Jamie Luke | 2001–2004 |
| Natalie Osborne | Tiffany Mulheron | 2003–2004 |
| Rachel Osborne | Lucy Evans | 2004 |
| Chloe Bruce | Mikyla Dodd | 2000–2004 |
| Matt Musgrove | Kristian Ealey | 2000–2004 |
| Kristian Hargreaves | Max Brown | 2002–2004 |
| Emma Chambers | Georgina Redhead | 2003–2004 |
| Patty Cornwell | Tracey Childs | 2003–2004 |
| Robbie Flynn | Andy Newton-Lee | 2003–2004 |
| Helen Cunningham | Kathryn George | 1997–2004 |

==== Last appeared in 2005 ====
| Character | Actor(s) | Duration |
|---|---|---|
| Freddy Watson | Greg Kelly | 2005 |
| Chris Fenwick | Chris Grierson | 2005 |
| Alex Harrison | Alistair Southey | 2005 |
| Ally Harrison | Louise Howell | 2005 |
| Richard Taylor | Richard Calkin | 2003–2005 |
| Andrea Mason | Claire King | 2005 |
| Sally Hunter | Katherine Dow Blyton | 2001–2005 |
| Les Hunter | John Graham Davies | 2001–2005 |
| Victoria Hutchinson | Fiona Mollison | 2000–2001, 2005 |
| Connor | Danann Breathnach | 2005 |
| Rory | Alex McGettigan | 2005 |
| Karen Taylor | Suzette Llewellyn | 2005 |
| Callum | Steven Fletcher | 2004–2005 |
| Ali Taylor | Luti Fagbenle | 2003–2005 |
| Stephen Mackintosh | Paul Holowaty | 2005 |
| Charles Hayton | Kevin McGowan | 2005 |
| Stacey Foxx | Jemma Keys | 2004–2005 |
| Will Davies | Barny Clevely | 2000–2005 |
| Will Davies | Billy Geraghty | 2000–2005 |
| Ellie Mills | Sarah Baxendale | 2002–2005 |
| Stuart Harding | Dan Cryer | 2004–2005 |
| Paula Fitzpatrick | Beth MacDonald | 2005 |
| Candy Browne | Laura Handley | 2004–2005 |
| Scott Anderson | Daniel Hyde | 2001–2005 |
| Abby Davies | Helen Noble | 2000–2005 |
| Bella Manning | Kim Bourelle | 2004–2005 |

==== Last appeared in 2006 ====
| Character | Actor(s) | Duration |
|---|---|---|
| Ricky Bowen | Simon Cassidy | 2006 |
| Ben Davies | Marcus Patric | 2000–2005, 2006 |
| Debbie Dean | Jodi Albert | 2002–2006 |
| Carrie Owen | Jaq Croft | 2004–2006 |
| Rob Owen | David Prosho | 2004–2006 |
| Sophie Burton | Connie Powney | 2003–2006 |
| Olivia Johnson | Rochelle Gadd | 2005–2006 |
| Joe Spencer | Matt Milburn | 2003–2006 |
| Sam Owen | Louis Tamone | 2004–2006 |
| Mel Burton | Cassie Powney | 2003–2006 |
| Diane Valentine | Pauline Black | 2006 |
| Jeremy Peterson | Simon Cole | 2005–2006 |
| Liz Burton | Andrée Bernard | 2003–2006 |
| Tommy MacIntyre | Ash Tandon | 2006 |
| DI Vicky Green | Francesca Ryan | 1998, 2005–2006 |
| DI Vicky Green | Rosie Fellner | 1998, 2005–2006 |
| Grace Hutchinson | Unknown | 2005–2006 |
| Mark Jury | Ash Newman | 2005–2006 |
| Cameron Clark | Ben Gerrard | 2002–2006 |
| Darlene Taylor | Sarah Lawrence | 2003–2006 |
| Andy Holt | Warren Brown | 2005–2006 |

==== Last appeared in 2007 ====
| Character | Actor(s) | Duration |
|---|---|---|
| Jessica Harris | Jennifer Biddall | 2005–2007 |
| Simon Crosby | Simon Lawson | 2007 |
| Gemma Crosby | Gemma Langford | 2007 |
| Pete Webster | Richard Cambridge | 2007 |
| Tessie Thompson | Sian Foulkes | 1998–1999, 2007 |
| Izzy Davies | Elize du Toit | 2000–2004, 2007 |
| Wayne Tunnicliffe | Joe Marsden | 2005–2007 |
| Melissa Hurst | Carla Chases | 2007 |
| Clive Harris | Andrew Forbes | 2007 |
| Noel Ashworth | Craig Cheetham | 2007 |
| Dannii Carbone | Christina Baily | 2004–2007 |
| Will Hackett | Oliver Farnworth | 2006–2007 |
| Sean Kennedy | Matthew Jay Lewis | 2006–2007 |
| Davey Thomas | Alex Preston | 2006–2007 |
| Becca Hayton | Ali Bastian | 2001–2007 |
| Bill Ashworth | John Jardine | 2005–2007 |
| Foz | Benjamin Hart | 2006–2007 |

==== Last appeared in 2008 ====
| Character | Actor(s) | Duration |
|---|---|---|
| Louise Summers | Roxanne McKee | 2005–2008 |
| Craig Dean | Guy Burnet | 2002–2008 |
| Spike | Tom Vaughan | 2007–2008 |
| Niall Rafferty | Barry Sloane | 2007–2008 |
| Father Raymond | Colin Connor | 2007–2008 |
| Danny Valentine | David Judge | 2007–2008 |
| Kieron Hobbs | Jake Hendriks | 2008 |
| Jamie "Fletch" Fletcher | Sam Darbyshire | 2005–2008 |
| Ruth Osborne | Terri Dwyer | 1996–2001, 2003–2004, 2008 |
| Eamon Fisher | Derek Halligan | 2008 |
| Max Cunningham | Matt Littler | 1995–2008 |
| Max Cunningham | Ben Sheriff | 1995–2008 |
| Angela Cunningham | Liz Stooke | 1995–1999, 2004, 2006, 2008 |
| Aleksander Malota | Jon Lolis | 2007–2008 |
| DI Tyler | Natasha Williams | 2008 |
| Tristan Burgess | William Rushton | 2007–2008 |
| Yasmin Burgess | Lauren Varnfield | 2007–2008 |
| Roger Kiddle | Quentin Tibble | 2008 |
| Beth Clement | Sinéad Moynihan | 2007–2008 |
| Summer Shaw | Summer Strallen | 2007–2008 |
| Mrs. Webster | Christine Macki | 2006–2008 |

==== Last appeared in 2009 ====
| Character | Actor(s) | Duration |
|---|---|---|
| Lily | Meryl Hampton | 2009 |
| Graham Carpenter | Paul Clarkson | 2007–2009 |
| Christine Carpenter | Race Davies | 2009 |
| Natty | Danny Tennant | 2009 |
| Sarah Barnes | Loui Batley | 2005–2009 |
| DS Murtaugh | Ray MacAllan | 2009 |
| Eli | Marc Silcock | 2008–2009 |
| Bel Roy | Nila Aalia | 2008–2009 |
| Govinda Roy | Antony Bunsee | 2008–2009 |
| Ash Roy | Junade Khan | 2008–2009 |
| Daniel Raven | Chris Hargreaves | 2009 |
| Abi Raven | Elaine Glover | 2009 |
| Bonnie Bevan | Melanie Walters | 2007–2009 |
| Gareth Bevan | Phil Howe | 2009 |
| Adrian Kennedy | Richard Lawrence | 2009 |
| Caleb Ramsey | Michael Ryan | 2009 |
| Mark Gascoyne | Craig Russell | 2008–2009 |
| Justin Burton | Chris Fountain | 2003–2009 |
| Yvonne Summers | Lysette Anthony | 2008–2009 |
| Nige Foster | Sam Townend | 2007–2009 |
| Matt Crosby | Chris Hall | 2008–2009 |

=== 2010s ===
==== Last appeared in 2010 ====
| Character | Actor(s) | Duration |
|---|---|---|
| Trev Costello | Scott Neal | 2010 |
| Danny Houston | Darren Day | 2010 |
| Gabby Sharpe | Phina Oruche | 2010 |
| Taylor Sharpe | Shaun Blackstock | 2010 |
| Arlo Davenport | Travis Yates | 2010 |
| Jem Costello | Helen Russell-Clark | 2010 |
| Liam McAllister | Chris Overton | 2010 |
| Ravi Roy | Stephen Uppal | 2008–2010 |
| Phil Sharpe | Andonis Anthony | 2010 |
| Erin Fisher | Gemma Craven | 2009–2010 |
| Malachy Fisher | Glen Wallace | 2007–2010 |
| Kris Fisher | Gerard McCarthy | 2006–2010 |
| Elliot Bevan | Garnon Davies | 2007–2010 |
| Kevin Smith | Cameron Crighton | 2010 |
| Alistair Longford | Terence Harvey | 2010 |
| Charlotte Lau | Amy Yamazaki | 2009–2010 |
| Dave Colburn | Elliot James Langridge | 2009–2010 |
| Sasha Valentine | Nathalie Emmanuel | 2006–2010 |
| Leo Valentine | Brian Bovell | 2006–2010 |
| Lauren Valentine | Dominique Jackson | 2007–2010 |
| Spencer Gray | Darren John Langford | 2008–2010 |
| Valerie Holden | Samantha Giles | 2007–2008, 2010 |
| Valerie Holden | Jacqueline Leonard | 2007–2008, 2010 |
| Zak Ramsey | Kent Riley | 2004–2010 |
| Jake Dean | Kevin Sacre | 2002–2010 |
| Des Townsend | Kris Deedigan | 2009–2010 |
| Rose Townsend | Libby Davison | 2010 |
| Tariq Mistry | Rudi Dharmalingham | 2010 |
| Meriel Vaughn | Emily Corselli | 2010 |
| Loretta Jones | Melissa Walton | 2009–2010 |
| Neville Ashworth | Jim Millea | 2005–2010 |
| Barry "Newt" Newton | Nico Mirallegro | 2007–2010 |
| Shelly Newton | Beverly Denim | 2008, 2010 |
| Olly Larkin | Oliver Watton | 2010 |
| Archie Carpenter | Stephen Beard | 2008–2010 |
| Eddie Griffiths | Che Watson | 2006, 2008–2010 |
| Sheila Buxton | Jessica Hall | 2009–2010 |
| Jamie | Finn Jones | 2009–2010 |
| Hayley Ramsey | Kelly-Marie Stewart | 2009–2010 |
| Fernando Fernandez | Jeronimo Best | 2009–2010 |
| Leila Roy | Lena Kaur | 2008–2010 |
| D.I. Fletcher | Laura Fletcher | 2009–2010 |
| Lydia Hart | Lydia Kelly | 2009–2010 |

==== Last appeared in 2011 ====
| Character | Actor(s) | Duration |
|---|---|---|
| Steph Cunningham | Carley Stenson | 2000–2011 |
| Rebecca "Jenny" Massey | Daisy Turner | 2011 |
| Ethan Scott | Craig Vye | 2010–2011 |
| Jason Costello | Victoria Atkin | 2010–2011 |
| Gilly Roach | Anthony Quinlan | 2005–2011 |
| Gaz Bennett | Joel Goonan | 2008–2011 |
| Kelly Saunders | Danielle Malone | 2011 |
| Heidi Costello | Kim Tiddy | 2010–2011 |
| Lee Hunter | Alex Carter | 2001–2005, 2010–2011 |
| Father Francis | Richard Winsor | 2011 |
| Rae Wilson | Alice Barlow | 2009–2011 |
| Jamil Fadel | Sikander Malik | 2010–2011 |
| Pete Hamill | Peter Mitchell | 2011 |
| Noah Baxter | Law Thompson | 2011 |
| William Alexander | Richard Graham | 2011 |
| Emily Alexander | Elizabeth Henstridge | 2011 |
| Calvin Valentine | Ricky Whittle | 2006–2011 |
| Kyle Ryder | Neil Toon | 2010–2011 |
| Melody Longford | Sandy Hendrickse | 2010–2011 |
| Anita Roy | Saira Choudhry | 2008–2011 |
| Eva Strong | Sheree Murphy | 2010–2011 |
| David "Bombhead" Burke | Lee Otway | 2001–2005, 2011 |
| Fern | Amy Gavin | 2010–2011 |

==== Last appeared in 2012 ====
| Character | Actor(s) | Duration |
|---|---|---|
| Eileen Brady | Rachel Doherty | 2010–2012 |
| Declan Brady | Jay Duffy | 2011–2012 |
| Elizabeth Morrison | Helen Grace | 2012 |
| Herb Carter | Todd Boyce | 2012 |
| Lacey Kane | Georgia Bourke | 2012 |
| Ally Gorman | Dan O'Connor | 2012 |
| Martin "Jono" Johnson | Dylan Llewellyn | 2011–2012 |
| Maddie Morrison | Scarlett Bowman | 2011–2012 |
| Neil Cooper | Tosin Cole | 2011–2012 |
| Eoghan Nolan | Alan Turkington | 2012 |
| Riley Costello | Rob Norbury | 2010–2012 |
| Ricky Campbell | Ashley Margolis | 2009–2012 |
| Josh Ashworth | Sonny Flood | 2005–2010, 2012 |
| Ryan | George Evans | 2012 |
| DI Small | Victoria Pritchard | 2011–2012 |
| Scott Sabeka | Calvin Demba | 2011–2012 |
| Ed Morrison | Dominic Rickhards | 2012 |
| India Longford | Beth Kingston | 2009–2012 |
| Laurence Saywood | As Himself | 2011–2012 |
| Louis Souyave | As Himself | 2011–2012 |
| Danny Lawrence | As Himself | 2011–2012 |
| Sam Fordham | As Himself | 2011–2012 |
| Matt Gill | As Himself | 2011–2012 |
| Wardy | Karl James Wilson | 2012 |
| Jodie Wilde | Montana Manning | 2011–2012 |
| Deena Hardman | Sian Breckin | 2012 |
| Graham Hardman | Steve Marsh | 2012 |
| Margaret Hayton | Darryl Fishwick | 2005–2007, 2012 |

==== Last appeared in 2013 ====
| Character | Actor(s) | Duration |
|---|---|---|
| Mel Jackson | Emma Rydal | 2012–2013 |
| Martha Kane | Carli Norris | 2012–2013 |
| Connie Carter | Julia Montgomery-Brown | 2012–2013 |
| Leanne Holiday | Jessica Forrest | 2010–2013 |
| Ash Kane | Holly Weston | 2011–2013 |
| Doug Carter | PJ Brennan | 2010–2013 |
| Doctor Browning | Joseph Thompson | 2012–2013 |
| Duncan Button | Dean Aspen | 2009–2011, 2013 |
| Callum Kane | Laurie Duncan | 2011–2013 |
| Kevin Foster | Elliot Balchin | 2013 |
| Jade Hedy | Lucy Gape | 2013 |
| Anna Blake | Saskia Wickham | 2013 |
| Pauline Hay | Jane Hogarth | 2008–2009, 2012–2013 |
| DS Richie Trent | Michael Dixon | 2013 |
| Lynsey Nolan | Karen Hassan | 2010–2013 |
| Frank Symes | Mark Wingett | 2013 |
| Barney Harper-McBride | Tom Scurr | 2011–2013 |
| Texas Longford | Bianca Hendrickse-Spendlove | 2010–2013 |
| Trudy Ryan | Danniella Westbrook | 2013 |
| Rob O'Connor | Gary Cargill | 2010–2011, 2013 |
| Liam Gilmore | James Farrar | 2012–2013 |
| Jen Gilmore | Amy Downham | 2012–2013 |
| Father Des | Patrick Miller | 2012–2013 |
| Nate Tenbury-Newent | Tom Turner | 2013 |
| Cheryl Brady | Bronagh Waugh | 2009–2013 |
| Brendan Brady | Emmett J. Scanlan | 2010–2013 |
| Seamus Brady | Fintan McKeown | 2012–2013 |
| Simon Walker | Neil Newbon | 2012–2013 |
| Dylan Shaw | Mikey Riddington-Smith | 2012–2013 |
| Annalise Appleton | Tamaryn Payne | 2011–2013 |
| Rob Edwards | David Atkins | 2011–2013 |
| Mitzeee Minniver | Rachel Shenton | 2010–2013 |
| Mr Keeler | Carl Cieka | 2012–2013 |

==== Last appeared in 2014 ====
| Character | Actor(s) | Duration |
|---|---|---|
| Blessing Chambers | Modupe Adeyeye | 2014 |
| Sonny Valentine | Aaron Fontaine | 2006–2007, 2014 |
| Sonny Valentine | Devon Anderson | 2006–2007, 2014 |
| Big Bob | Vincent Ebrahim | 2014 |
| Kathleen McQueen | Alison Burrows | 2009–2011, 2014 |
| George Smith | Steven Roberts | 2011–2014 |
| Vincent Elegba | John Omole | 2013–2014 |
| Amber Sharpe | Lauren Gabrielle-Thomas | 2010, 2014 |
| Amber Sharpe | Lydia Lloyd-Henry | 2010, 2014 |
| Bella Sharpe | Imaani Byndloss | 2013–2014 |
| Rhys Ashworth | Andrew Moss | 2005–2012, 2014 |
| Sam Lomax | Lizzie Roper | 2013–2014 |
| Danny Lomax | Stephen Billington | 2013–2014 |
| Fraser Black | Jesse Birdsall | 2013–2014 |
| Alex Browning | Ojan Genc | 2014 |
| Superintendent Marlow | Paul Clayton | 2013–2014 |
| Katy O'Connor | Uncredited | 2013–2014 |
| Jim McGinn | Dan Tetsell | 2012–2014 |
| Chloe | Susan Loughnane | 2013–2014 |
| Tilly Evans | Lucy Dixon | 2011–2014 |

==== Last appeared in 2015 ====
| Character | Actor(s) | Duration |
|---|---|---|
| Ziggy Roscoe | Fabrizio Santino | 2013–2015 |
| Porsche McQueen | Twinnie-Lee Moore | 2014–2015 |
| Kyle Bigsby | Mitchell Hunt | 2015 |
| Dr. Charles S'avage | Andrew Greenough | 2014–2015 |
| Ashley Davidson | Kierston Wareing | 2015 |
| Sadie Bradley | Kirsty Mitchell | 2015 |
| Angela Brown | Adele Silva | 2015 |
| Derek Clough | Bruce Montague | 2015 |
| Dylan Jenkins | James Fletcher | 2015 |
| Mark Brown | Ben Faulks | 2015 |
| Carly Bradley | Sophie Wise | 2015 |
| Aiden Bigsby | Joseph Cocklin | 2015 |
| Val Jenkins | Tanya Robb | 2015 |
| Phoebe McQueen | Mandip Gill | 2012–2015 |
| Mariam Andrews | Helen Lederer | 2013, 2015 |
| Will Savage | James Atherton | 2011–2015 |
| Sandy Roscoe | Gillian Taylforth | 2013–2015 |
| Rick Spencer | Victor Gardener | 2014–2015 |

==== Last appeared in 2016 ====
| Character | Actor(s) | Duration |
|---|---|---|
| Dr. Barton | Amanda Muggleton | 2016 |
| Celine McQueen | Sarah George | 2014–2016 |
| Joanne Cardsley | Rachel Leskovac | 2015–2016 |
| JJ Roscoe | Jax and Danny Beswick | 2014–2016 |
| Jude Cunningham | Davinia Taylor | 1996–1998, 2016 |
| Joe Roscoe | Ayden Callaghan | 2013–2016 |
| Sonia Albright | Kiza Deen | 2015–2016 |
| Dr. Berrington | Tupele Dorgu | 2015–2016 |
| Juanita Salvador Martinez Hernandez De La Cruz | Jacey Sallés | 2016 |
| Billy Brodie | Clive Russell | 2016 |
| Maria | Fernanda Diniz | 2016 |
| Reenie McQueen | Zöe Lucker | 2015–2016 |
| Ben Bradley | Ben Richards | 2015–2016 |
| Trevor Royle | Greg Wood | 2013–2016 |
| Lindsey Butterfield | Sophie Austin | 2013–2016 |
| Lockie Campbell | Nick Rhys | 2014–2016 |
| Rachel Hardy | Jennifer Brooke | 2015–2016 |
| Jason Roscoe | Alfie Browne-Sykes | 2013–2016 |
| Wayne | Nathan Whitfield | 2015–2016 |

==== Last appeared in 2017 ====
| Character | Actor(s) | Duration |
|---|---|---|
| DS Gavin Armstrong | Andrew Hayden-Smith | 2016–2017 |
| Mark Gibbs | Colin Parry | 1999–2000, 2017 |
| Frankie Osborne | Helen Pearson | 2002–2017 |
| Neeta Kaur | Amrit Maghera | 2015–2017 |
| Johnno Dean | Colin Wells | 2002–2005, 2017 |
| Johnno Dean | Mark Powley | 2002–2005, 2017 |
| Amy Barnes | Ashley Slanina-Davies | 2005–2014, 2016–2017 |
| Tracey Donovan | Lisa Maxwell | 2016–2017 |
| Mike Barnes | Tony Hirst | 2006–2010, 2016–2017 |
| Kathy Barnes | Sarah Jane Buckley | 2005–2008, 2017 |
| Nick Savage | Ben-Ryan Davies | 2016–2017 |
| Bart McQueen | Jonny Clarke | 2010–2013, 2017 |
| Lynette Drinkwell | Amy Robbins | 2017 |
| Katy Fox | Hannah Tointon | 2007–2008, 2017 |
| Diego Salvador Martinez Hernandez De La Cruz | Juan Pablo Yepez | 2015–2017 |
| Tabitha Maxwell-Brown | Linda Gray | 2016–2017 |
| Jade Albright | Kassius Nelson | 2015–2017 |
| Nathan Nightingale | Jared Garfield | 2015–2017 |
| Cameron Campbell | Cameron Moore | 2014–2017 |
| Eva Falco | Kerry Bennett | 2016–2017 |
| Sam "O.B." O'Brien | Darren Jeffries | 1997–2008, 2016–2017 |

==== Last appeared in 2018 ====
| Character | Actor(s) | Duration |
|---|---|---|
| Russ Owen | Stuart Manning | 2004–2009, 2018 |
| Glenn Donovan | Bob Cryer | 2017–2018 |
| Glenn Donovan | Neil Roberts | 2017–2018 |
| Carl Costello | Paul Opacic | 2010–2013, 2018 |
| DS Roxy Cassidy | Lizzie Stavrou | 2016–2018 |
| Kim Butterfield | Daisy Wood-Davis | 2014–2018 |
| Tegan Lomax | Jessica Ellis | 2013–2018 |
| Asha Kaur | Rukku Nahar | 2018 |
| Julie Matthews | Julie Buckfield | 1995–1997, 2002, 2007, 2018 |
| Ellie Nightingale | Sophie Porley | 2015–2018 |
| Milo Entwistle | Nathan Morris | 2017–2018 |
| Dennis Savage | Joe Tracini | 2011–2014, 2018 |
| Granny Campbell | Jenny Lee | 2017–2018 |
| Dirk Savage | David Kennedy | 2011–2018 |
| Fran Hathaway | Donna Henry | 2007, 2018 |
| Kashif Maalik | Nitin Patel | 2018 |
| Josh Bradley | Rupert Hill | 2018 |
| Billy Parker | Daniel Jillings | 2012, 2018 |
| Billy Parker | Michael Parr | 2012, 2018 |
| Adam Donovan | Jimmy Essex | 2016–2018 |
| Theo Jones | Matt Kennard | 2018 |
| Ryan Knight | Duncan James | 2016–2018 |
| Esther Bloom | Jazmine Franks | 2011–2018 |
| Ruby Button | Anna Shaffer | 2011–2014, 2017–2018 |
| Darcy Wilde | Aisling Jarrett-Gavin | 2017–2018 |
| Toby Wilde | Lucas Haywood | 2017–2018 |
| Shane Sweeney | Michael Salami | 2017–2018 |
| Shane Sweeney | Lanre Malaolu | 2017–2018 |
| D.S. Geoff Thorpe | James Bradshaw | 2014–2018 |
| Maggie Kinsella | Michelle Holmes | 2017–2018 |

==== Last appeared in 2019 ====
| Character | Actor(s) | Duration |
|---|---|---|
| Finn O'Connor | Keith Rice | 2010–2011, 2013–2015, 2017, 2019 |
| Finn O'Connor | Connor Wilkinson | 2010–2011, 2013–2015, 2017, 2019 |
| Jonny Baxter | Ray Quinn | 2018–2019 |
| Stuart Sumner | Chris Simmons | 2019 |
| Sinead O'Connor | Stephanie Davis | 2010–2015, 2018–2019 |
| Harry Thompson | Parry Glasspool | 2007–2009, 2015–2019 |
| Harry Thompson | Harrison George Rhodes | 2007–2009, 2015–2019 |
| Harry Thompson | Daniel Seymour | 2007–2009, 2015–2019 |
| Laurie Shelby | Kyle Pryor | 2018–2019 |
| Levi Rochester | Cerith Flinn | 2019 |
| Max Owen | Gabriel Lawrence | 2008–2009, 2018–2019 |
| Max Owen | Brayden Haynes-Mawdsley | 2008–2009, 2018–2019 |
| Nicole Owen | Ciara Janson | 2004–2007, 2019 |
| Farrah Maalik | Krupa Pattani | 2017–2019 |
| Lily Drinkwell | Lauren McQueen | 2017–2019 |
| Babs Drinkwell | Samantha Mesagno | 2019 |
| Carmina McQueen | Harlow Mia Jones | 2017–2019 |
| Mac Nightingale | David Easter | 2015–2019 |
| Harley Frater | Mollie Lambert | 2018–2019 |
| Alfie Nightingale | Richard Linnell | 2015–2019 |
| Simone Loveday | Jacqueline Boatswain | 2015–2019 |
| Zack Loveday | Duayne Boachie | 2015–2019 |
| Holly Cunningham | Amanda Clapham | 1997–2000, 2002, 2004, 2008–2010, 2012–2019 |
| Holly Cunningham | Wallis Day | 1997–2000, 2002, 2004, 2008–2010, 2012–2019 |
| Holly Cunningham | Lydia Waters | 1997–2000, 2002, 2004, 2008–2010, 2012–2019 |
| Holly Cunningham | Katie Hynes | 1997–2000, 2002, 2004, 2008–2010, 2012–2019 |
| Holly Cunningham | Karis Sharkey | 1997–2000, 2002, 2004, 2008–2010, 2012–2019 |
| Louis Loveday | Karl Collins | 2015–2019 |

=== 2020s ===
==== Last appeared in 2020 ====
| Character | Actor(s) | Duration |
|---|---|---|
| Jordan Price | Connor Calland | 2019–2020 |
| Edward Hutchinson | Joe McGann | 2019–2020 |
| Nico Blake | Persephone Swales-Dawson | 2014–2016, 2018, 2020 |
| Kurt Benson | Jeremy Edwards | 1995–1999, 2020 |
| Mitchell Deveraux | Imran Adams | 2019–2020 |
| Lisa Loveday | Rachel Adedeji | 2015–2020 |
| Kyle Kelly | Adam Rickitt | 2017–2020 |
| Liam Donovan | Jude Monk McGowan | 2016–2020 |
| Liam Donovan | Maxim Baldry | 2016–2020 |
| Iona | Isla Jordan | 2017–2020 |
| Azim Desai | Nav Sidhu | 2019–2020 |
| Jesse Donovan | Luke Jerdy | 2016–2020 |
| Breda McQueen | Moya Brady | 2018–2020 |

==== Last appeared in 2021 ====
| Character | Actor(s) | Duration |
|---|---|---|
| Mandy Richardson | Sarah Jayne Dunn | 1996–2008, 2010–2011, 2017–2021 |
| Sami Maalik | Rishi Nair | 2017–2021 |
| Fergus Collins | Robert Beck | 2021 |
| Summer Ranger | Rhiannon Clements | 2020–2021 |
| Timmy Simons | Sam Tutty | 2021 |
| Brody Hudson | Adam Woodward | 2017–2021 |
| Lydia Smith | Cathy Shipton | 2021 |
| George Kiss | Callum Kerr | 2020–2021 |
| Buster Smith | Nathan Sussex | 2018–2021 |
| Sue Morgan | Marian McLoughlin | 1999–2002, 2021 |
| Sue Morgan | Eve White | 1999–2002, 2021 |
| Courtney Campbell | Amy Conachan | 2016–2021 |
| Pete Buchanan | Kai Owen | 2015–2016, 2018, 2021 |
| Marco | AJ Pritchard | 2021 |
| Jacob | Curtis Pritchard | 2021 |
| Brad King | Tom Benedict Knight | 2021 |
| Cormac Ranger | James Gaddas | 2020–2021 |
| Seth Costello | Miles Higson | 2010–2011, 2020–2021 |
| The Doll | Molly Jenkins | 2020–2021 |

==== Last appeared in 2022 ====
| Character | Actor(s) | Duration |
|---|---|---|
| Olivia Bradshaw | Emily Burnett | 2021–2022 |
| Verity Hutchinson | Eva O'Hara | 2020–2022 |
| Walter Deveraux | Trevor A. Toussaint | 2018–2022 |
| Joseph Holmes | Olly Rhodes | 2022 |
| Sid Sumner | Billy Price | 2019–2022 |
| Silas Blissett | Jeff Rawle | 2010–2012, 2016, 2020–2022 |
| Lexi Calder | Natalie Anderson | 2021–2022 |
| Victor Brothers | Benjamin O'Mahony | 2020–2022 |
| Ripley Lennox | Ki Griffin | 2020–2022 |
| Saul Reeves | Chris Charles | 2021–2022 |
| Scarlett Morgan | Susie Amy | 2018, 2022 |
| Ali Shahzad | Raji James | 2021–2022 |
| Wendy Blissett | Jennifer Armour | 2022 |
| Alex Ramsdan | Matt Lapinskas | 2022 |
| Martine Deveraux | Kéllé Bryan | 2018–2022 |
| Lisa Hunter | Gemma Atkinson | 2001–2005, 2022 |
| Kameela | Anu Hasan | 2018–2019, 2022 |
| Becky Quentin | Katie McGlynn | 2021–2022 |
| Toby Faroe | Bobby Gordon | 2019–2022 |
| Dr Ley | Sabina Cameron | 2020–2022 |
| Cher Winters | Bethannie Hare | 2020–2022 |
| Maya Harkwell | Ky Discala | 2021–2022 |
| Marnie Nightingale | Lysette Anthony | 2016–2022 |
| Celeste Faroe | Andrea Ali | 2019–2022 |
| Trish Minniver | Denise Welch | 2010–2012, 2021–2022 |
| Trish Minniver | Paula Wolfenden | 2010–2012, 2021–2022 |

==== Last appeared in 2023 ====
| Character | Actor(s) | Duration | Ref(s) |
|---|---|---|---|
| Jacqui McQueen | Claire Cooper | 2006–2013, 2023 | |
| Sam Chen-Williams | Matthew McGivern | 2021–2023 | |
| Faye Fuller | Maddy Smedley | 2023 | |
| Donna-Marie Quinn | Lucy-Jo Hudson | 2018–2023 | |
| DeMarcus Westwood | Tomi Ade | 2021–2023 | |
| Luke Morgan | Gary Lucy | 1999–2002, 2017–2023 | |
| Oliver Morgan | Gabriel Clark | 2018–2023 | |
| Oliver Morgan | Aedan Duckworth | 2018–2023 | |
| Zara Morgan | Kelly Condron | 1999–2005, 2021–2023 | |
| Damon Kinsella | Jacob Roberts | 2017–2023 | |
| Juliet Nightingale | Niamh Blackshaw | 2018–2023 | |
| Eric Foster | Angus Castle-Doughty | 2022–2023 | |
| Honour Chen-Williams | Vera Chok | 2021–2023 | |
| Matthew McQueen | Matthew Clohessy | 2012–2017, 2020–2023 | |
| Matthew McQueen | Malachy and Connor Birchall | 2012–2017, 2020–2023 | |
| DS Naomi Cohen | Ariana Fraval | 2019–2023 | |
| Serena Chen-Williams | Emma Lau | 2021–2023 | |
| Shaq Qureshi | Omar Malik | 2021–2023 | |

==== Last appeared in 2024 ====
| Character | Actor(s) | Duration | Ref(s) |
|---|---|---|---|
| Nana McQueen | Diane Langton | 2007–2009, 2012–2024 | |
| Ethan Williams | Matthew James-Bailey | 2021–2024 | |
| Dave Chen-Williams | Dominic Power | 2021–2024 | |
| Suzanne Ashworth | Suzanne Hall | 2005–2012, 2024 | |
| Andre Clark | David Joshua-Anthony | 2023–2024 | |
| Steph Cunningham-Lomax | Isabella Hibbert | 2015–2024 | |
| Steph Cunningham-Lomax | Katie | 2015–2024 | |
| Hilton Cunningham | Blake Wood | 2014–2024 | |
| Kitty Draper | Iz Hesketh | 2024 | |
| Beau Ramsey | Jon-Paul Bell | 2022–2024 | |
| Norma Crow | Glynis Barber | 2022–2024 | |
| Freya Calder | Ellie Henry | 2022–2024 | |
| Scott Drinkwell | Ross Adams | 2015–2024 | |
| Hannah Ashworth | Emma Rigby | 2005–2010, 2024 | |
| Zain Rizwaan | Jonas Khan | 2022–2024 | |
| Noah Dexter | Uncredited | 2024 | |
| Carter Shepherd | David Ames | 2023–2024 | |
| Declan Hawthorne | Alan Turkington | 2024 | |
| Hunter McQueen | Theo Graham | 2016–2018, 2022–2024 | |
| Mason Chen-Williams | Frank Kauer | 2021–2024 | |
| Lizzie Chen-Williams | Lily Best | 2021–2024 | |
| Sharon Bailey | Jamelia | 2021, 2023–2024 | |
| Kane | Ben Castle-Gibb | 2024 | |
| Romeo Nightingale | Owen Warner | 2018–2024 | |
| Yasmine Maalik | Haiesha Mistry | 2017–2024 | |
| Patrick Blake | Jeremy Sheffield | 2012–2016, 2024 | |
| Felix Westwood | Richard Blackwood | 2020–2024 | |
| Shing Lin Leong | Izzie Yip | 2022–2024 | |
| Phoenix Hathaway | Tylan Grant | 2018–2024 | |
| Rafe Harcourt | Chris Gordon | 2023−2024 | |
| Ella Richardson | Erin Palmer | 2008, 2017–2024 | |
| Nadira Valli | Ashling O'Shea | 2022–2024 | |
| Lacey Lloyd | Annabelle Davis | 2023–2024 | |
| Rayne Royce | Jemma Donovan | 2023–2024 | |

==== Last appeared in 2025 ====
| Character | Actor(s) | Duration | Ref(s) |
|---|---|---|---|
| Tom Cunningham | Ellis Hollins | 1999–2025 | |
| Billy Corkhill | John McArdle | 2025 | |
| Arlo Fielding | Dan Hough | 2024–2025 | |
| Marie Fielding | Rita Simons | 2012, 2024–2025 | |
| Marie Fielding | Emma Campbell Jones | 2012, 2024–2025 | |
| Esme Dixon | Yasmin Davies | 2025 | |
| Grace Black | Tamara Wall | 2013–2025 | |
| Jeremy Blake | Jeremy Sheffield | 2024–2025 | |
| Sheila Grant | Sue Johnston | 2025 | |
| Barry Grant | Paul Usher | 2025 | |
| Bobby Grant | Ricky Tomlinson | 2025 | |
| Peri Lomax | Ruby O'Donnell | 2013–2025 | |
| Rory Finnigan | James Redmond | 1998–2002, 2013, 2015, 2017–2018, 2025 | |
| Carol Groves | Natalie Casey | 1996–2000, 2025 | |
| Zoe Carpenter | Zoë Lister | 2006–2010, 2017, 2025 | |
| Joel Dexter | Rory Douglas-Speed | 2011–2013, 2016–2025 | |
| Joel Dexter | Andrew Still | 2011–2013, 2016–2025 | |
| Martha Blake | Sherrie Hewson | 2024–2025 | |
| Jacob Omari | Ethaniel Davy | 2024–2025 | |
| Robbie Roscoe | Charlie Wernham | 2013–2016, 2024–2025 | |
| Bobby Costello | Zak Sutcliffe | 2011–2013, 2018–2023, 2025 | |
| Bobby Costello | Jayden Fox | 2011–2013, 2018–2023, 2025 | |
| Bobby Costello | Jake Chialton | 2011–2013, 2018–2023, 2025 | |
| Freddie Roscoe | Charlie Clapham | 2013–2017, 2024–2025 | |
| DI Alistair Banks | Drew Cain | 2013–2014, 2016, 2019, 2022–2025 | |
| Kat Omari | Sonia Ibrahim | 2024–2025 | |
| Tommy Odenkirk | Brandon Fellows | 2025 | |
| Maxine Minniver | Nikki Sanderson | 2012–2025 | |
| Minnie Minniver | Eva Lorente | 2014−2020, 2022–2025 | |
| Minnie Minniver | Ava Rooney | 2014−2020, 2022–2025 | |
| Abe Fielding | Tyler Conti | 2024–2025 | |
| Theo Anderson | Uncredited | 2024–2025 | |
| JJ Osborne | Ryan Mulvey | 2011, 2024–2025 | |
| JJ Osborne | Reuben | 2011, 2024–2025 | |
| Dilly Harcourt | Emma Johnsey-Smith | 2023–2025 | |

==== Last appeared in 2026 ====
| Character | Actor(s) | Duration | Ref(s) |
|---|---|---|---|
| Jenson Cole | Ryan Clayton | 2026 | |
| Rex Gallagher | Jonny Labey | 2024–2026 | |
| Diane Hutchinson | Alex Fletcher | 2010–2026 | |
| Clare Devine | Gemma Bissix | 2005–2007, 2009, 2013, 2025–2026 | |
| Clare Devine | Samantha Rowley | 2005–2007, 2009, 2013, 2025–2026 | |
| Charlie Dean | Charlie Behan | 2006–2026 | |
| Charlie Dean | Joshua McConville | 2006–2026 | |
| Froggy Black | John Middleton | 2025–2026 | |
| Connor "Sully" Sullivan | Harry French | 2025–2026 | |
| Dominic Reilly | John Pickard | 2005–2010, 2025–2026 | |
| Dillon Ray | Nathaniel Dass | 2023–2026 | |
| James | Uncredited | 2024–2026 | |
| Tim O'Leary | Philip Olivier | 2025–2026 | |
| Nikki Shadwick | Suzanne Collins | 2025–2026 | |
| John Paul McQueen | James Sutton | 2006–2008, 2012–2017, 2019–2026 | |
| Smithy | Kurtis Stacey | 2025–2026 | |
| Carmel McQueen | Gemma Merna | 2006–2014, 2026 | |
| Michaela McQueen | Hollie-Jay Bowes | 2006–2012, 2026 | |
| Tina Reilly | Leah Hackett | 2006–2008, 2026 | |
| Sally St. Claire | Annie Wallace | 2015–2024, 2026 | |
| Sylver McQueen | David Tag | 2018–2022, 2026 | |

== Lists of characters by year of introduction ==
- 1995–96
- 1997
- 1998
- 1999
- 2000
- 2001
- 2002
- 2003
- 2004
- 2005
- 2006
- 2007
- 2008
- 2009
- 2010
- 2011
- 2012
- 2013
- 2014
- 2015
- 2016
- 2017
- 2018
- 2019
- 2020
- 2021
- 2022
- 2023
- 2024
- 2025
- 2026
