= List of Hollyoaks characters introduced in 2004 =

The following is a list of characters that first appeared in the Channel 4 soap opera Hollyoaks in 2004, in order of first appearance.

== Arthur Davies ==
Arthur Davies
- Hollyoaks character
- Portrayed by: Uncredited
- Duration: 2004–2005
- First appearance: 19 February 2004
- Last appearance: 12 December 2005
- Introduced by: Jo Hallows
In-universe information
- Father: Ben Davies
- Mother: Emma Chambers
- Stepmother: Izzy Davies
- Grandfathers: Will Davies
- Grandmothers: Alison Davies
- Aunts: Abby Davies

Arthur Davies is the son of Emma Chambers and Ben Davies, conceived during their affair. When Emma discovered she was pregnant, Ben decided to have nothing to do with the baby and married his girlfriend, Izzy Cornwell (Elize du Toit). When Emma gave birth to Arthur in February 2004, Ben changed his mind. Ben and Izzy's marriage broke down and Emma decided that she wanted to raise Arthur alone. When Ben began a relationship with Lisa Hunter (Gemma Atkinson), he filed for custody of Arthur, but was talked into withdrawing when Lisa admitted that she didn't want to have to be a mother figure to Arthur.

== Stacey Foxx ==
Stacey Foxx
- Hollyoaks character
- Portrayed by: Jemma Keys
- Duration: 2004–2005
- First appearance: 6 April 2004
- Last appearance: 12 July 2005
- Introduced by: Jo Hallows
In-universe information
- Occupation: Beautician

Stacey Foxx first appeared when she had a one-night stand of Kristian Hargreaves, who later used her to make his girlfriend Dannii Carbone jealous. Stacey became obsessed with him Kristian, who learned that she was working with Dannii to teach him a lesson for his poor treatment of women. Stacey next appeared some time later when she lost her salon job and started up Foxx & Hunter's Health Haven, a short-lived makeshift salon in the Hunter household with fellow beauty student Lee Hunter. Stacey began to have feelings for him and one day, decided to seduce him using whipped cream, however his mother Sally showed up and assumed she was using their home for escorting. Lee was too confused to defend Stacey and she stormed out of the house. Stacey and Lee left for a few months to work at a health spa but Lee was kicked out after taking the blame for Stacey making a mistake with Liz Burton's treatment. Stacey chose to stay at the spa instead of resuming her partnership with Lee.

== Carrie Owen ==
Carrie Owen
- Hollyoaks character
- Portrayed by: Jaq Croft
- Duration: 2004–2006
- First appearance: 2 August 2004
- Last appearance: 25 September 2006
- Introduced by: Jo Hallows
In-universe information
- Husband: Rob Owen
- Sons: Russ Owen; Sam Owen
- Daughters: Nicole Owen
- Grandsons: Max Owen

Carrie Owen was played by Jaq Croft.

Carrie arrived in Hollyoaks with her children Sam, Russ and Nicole and had a whole mystery to her family. Eventually, it was revealed that Carrie and her family had to move homes because of Sam having been in prison for three years due to setting a house on fire, a crime that he never committed. Later on, Carrie’s husband, Rob, arrived in the village and wanted to make up with his family after they had a fall out over Sam’s innocence. Carrie decided to allow Rob to move back in with the family and slowly Carrie and Rob got back together.

Although Carrie may seem over protected over her children, she always had their best interests but sometimes it worked against her. Russ had testicular cancer and wanted to cope with the situation by himself, however after eventually he confessed to his mother, she supported Russ through his ordeal. However, Carrie and family’s world was to turn upside down when Sam confessed that he has been spiking and raping girls. With little choice, Carrie and her family forced Sam to turn himself to the police and as he finally did, it was too devastating for Carrie. Sam was sentenced for 25 years, which left Carrie heartbroken and even further more when Sam told her that he no longer wanted prison visits.

Six months down the line, Sam escaped from prison and this time the effects were to be horrendous. He burnt down the local pub The Dog in The Pond which left several people dead (including Sam himself). Carrie throw herself into the household chores and organised Sam's funeral. Both Nicole and Russ refused to go to the funeral with Russ deciding to intend his girlfriend Sophie Burton and her sister Mel Burton’s funeral who both had also died in The Dog in The Pond fire and Carrie was left shattered by this. With Nicole being bullied and the Owen family receiving abuse from the minority residents of Hollyoaks, Carrie decided it was the best for her and her family to move away from Hollyoaks. Carrie, Rob and Nicole left the village behind except Russ as he wanted to stay with girlfriend Mercedes McQueen. Nicole returned to give evidence at Becca's trial and for Russ's wedding but neither Carrie or Rob have ever returned to Hollyoaks.

In 2018, Mercedes went to stay with Rob and Carrie for a while before going to Spain after giving her son Bobby to Cleo to hide him from Carl. She later mentioned that the couple move on from their past and forgive her for her affair with Warren and accept her to relationship with Russ once again.

== Sam Owen ==
Samuel Liam "Sam" Owen was killed off in the famous fire at The Dog. He died with: Olivia Johnson, Joe Spencer, Sophie Burton and Mel Burton. He was one of Hollyoaks' most memorable villains.

== Callum ==
Callum
- Hollyoaks character
- Portrayed by: Steven Cartait
- Duration: 2004–05
- First appearance: 13 August 2004
- Last appearance: 1 September 2005
- Introduced by: Jo Hallows
In-universe information
- Occupation: Fireman

Callum was a friend and colleague of Ben Davies. Callum moved in with Ben and his girlfriend Lisa Hunter and tried to help Ben get over his fear of fire and return to his job as a firefighter. After Ben decides to quit his job, Callum threw a party. He made his final appearance in August 2005.

== Rachel Osborne ==
Rachel Osborne
- Hollyoaks character
- Portrayed by: Lucy Evans
- First appearance: 24 August 2004
- Last appearance: 2004
- Introduced by: Jo Hallows
In-universe information
- Occupation: Barmaid
- Family: Osborne
- Father: Kenneth Osborne
- Mother: Amanda Osborne
- Sisters: Natalie Osborne
- Uncles: Jack Osborne
- First cousins: Darren Osborne; Bethany Cunningham

Rachel Osborne is a fictional character from the long-running Channel 4 soap opera Hollyoaks, played by Lucy Evans. She joined the show in 2004 before leaving later that year. Her sister Natalie Osborne was horrified when Rachel arrived and vowed to get rid of her as soon as possible. After weeks of fighting and squabbling, the final straw came when her uncle Jack Osborne found out about her failing her exams due to the lack of work and also her second pregnancy but not knowing who the father was. Despite using her charms, Jack told Rachel and Natalie that they were being sent home. Rachel was delighted, and both left, going back to Scotland.

== Jules ==
Jules
- Hollyoaks character
- Portrayed by: Catherine Le Brun
- Duration: 2004–2005
- First appearance: 31 August 2004
- Last appearance: 15 July 2005
- Introduced by: Jo Hallows
In-universe information
- Father: Pete

Jules was the ex-girlfriend of Sam Owen (Louis Tamone). Jules had previously been pregnant with Sam's baby, but had an abortion. Not long afterwards, Jules's house caught fire and her brother died in the blaze. Sam was accused of starting the fire and spent three years in prison.

In September 2004, Sam met with Jules in secret, still wanting a reconciliation. Jules shared a kiss with Sam's brother Russ (Stuart Manning), which she immediately told Sam about, but Sam refused to believe that she instigated the kiss. After Sam told Russ about the abortion, Jules left. Sam met with Jules again in July 2005. He discovered that Jules had started the fire in revenge for her dad forcing her into having an abortion, not realising her brother was inside.

== Stuart Harding ==
Stuart Harding
- Hollyoaks character
- Portrayed by: Dan Cryer
- Duration: 2004–2005
- First appearance: October 2004
- Last appearance: 4 March 2005
- Introduced by: Jo Hallows
In-universe information
- Occupation: Student; Fitness Instructor

Stuart Harding was an American fitness instructor who resided the village between 2004 and 2005.

== Bella Manning ==
Bella Manning
- Hollyoaks character
- Portrayed by: Kim Bourelle
- Duration: 2004–2005
- First appearance: 15 October 2004
- Last appearance: 21 January 2005
- Introduced by: Jo Hallows
In-universe information
- Occupation: Student

Bella Manning is a fictional character on the long-running Channel 4 British television soap opera Hollyoaks. She was played by actress Kim Bourelle and appeared between 2004 and 2005.

== James Walker ==
James Walker
- Hollyoaks character
- Portrayed by: O-T Fagbenle
- First appearance: 25 October 2004
- Last appearance: 17 December 2004
- Introduced by: Jo Hallows
In-universe information
- Occupation: Lecturer

James Walker, played by O-T Fagbenle, was Lisa Hunter's (Gemma Atkinson) tutor at Hollyoaks Community College. Lisa originally believed that James was a mature student, and was shocked to discover that he was her lecturer. Regardless, Lisa was still left smitten by him and the pair began an affair. However, Lisa soon discovered that James had a girlfriend and a child, and broke up with him.

== Chris Fenwick ==
Chris Fenwick
- Hollyoaks character
- Portrayed by: Chris Grierson
- Duration: 2004–2005
- First appearance: 1 November 2004
- Last appearance: 16 December 2005
- Introduced by: Jo Hallows
In-universe information
- Occupation: Student

Chris Fenwick is a fictional character on the long-running Channel 4 British television soap opera Hollyoaks. He was played by Chris Grierson and appeared between 2004 and 2005.

Chris was a newspaper reporter and student at Hollyoaks Community College. He lost his position as the president to Lee Hunter (Alex Carter) and convinced Lee to allow him to be his vice president. Lee's friend, Bombhead (Lee Otway), tried to warn Lee of Chris's motives, but Chris managed to drive a wedge between the pair. When Bombhead discovered that Chris was causing Lee to spend more money than what was in the college's funds, he tried to warn Lee but Lee refused to listen to him. Lee then discovered Chris's plan, and recruited the help of Jeremy Peterson (Simon Cole) to break into the school and steal Chris's files. Chris, with the help of Freddy Watson (Greg Kelly), set fire to the media lab at the school and attempted to frame Lee and Zara Morgan (Kelly Greenwood) for the crime. Lee, Zara, Freddy and Chris were all kicked out of school, but faced no legal action due to the lack of evidence.

== Candy Browne ==
Candy Browne
- Hollyoaks character
- Portrayed by: Laura Handley
- Duration: 2004–2005
- First appearance: 11 November 2004
- Last appearance: 15 February 2005
- Introduced by: Jo Hallows

Candy Browne is a fictional character from the long-running Channel 4 soap opera Hollyoaks, played by Laura Handley. The character was written out in 2005. Candy was friends with Nicole Owen and Candy encouraged Nicole to send in images of herself to a modelling agency, only to be told that her breasts were too small. Nicole then wanted to get implants and asked Candy to pretend she invited Nicole on holiday with her and her family. Nicole did not go through with the operation and her mum eventually found out what she had planned to do. The following Christmas the two girls went carol singing for money and when they returned to school they made friends with new girl Paula Johnson. Paula tried to break up the two friends. Candy left after a blazing row with Nicole following stirring by Paula. Candy brought up Nicole's brother Sam Owen and his conviction for arson calling him a "kiddy murderer". Nicole never forgave her for this and Candy was never seen again.

== Michelle Dean ==
Michelle Dean
- Hollyoaks character
- Duration: 2004–2005
- First appearance: 16 November 2004
- Last appearance: 31 July 2005
- Introduced by: Jo Hallows
In-universe information
- Occupation: Student
- Husband: Johnno Dean
- Sons: Presley Dean
- Stepsons: Jake Dean; Craig Dean
- Stepdaughters: Steph Dean; Debbie Dean

Michelle Dean was a seven-months pregnant 19-year-old student first seen in November 2004 as a mysterious character in the background of Johnno Dean. It was revealed that after Johnno became alienated from his wife Frankie Dean while suffering from a midlife crisis caused by the collapse of his workplace several months earlier, he had a drunken fling with Michelle which, while only intended as a one-off, developed into an affair after Michelle discovered that she was pregnant with Johnno's baby. Frankie immediately filed for a divorce, and Johnno and Michelle left Hollyoaks soon after, getting married in July 2005 after Johnno's divorce from Frankie was finalised. They briefly returned to Hollyoaks in July 2005, at which time it was revealed that Michelle had given birth to a son, named Presley. Steph went to see on her wedding day to her father and visiting them and Presley. Steph later told her mother that she and Michelle get along together.

In 2015, Frankie went to visit her and Johnno. In 2017, when Johnno arrives at the village, he mentioned to Frankie that he was no longer with Michelle, and Presley was living with him, although the circumstances behind this were not explained.

== Paula Fitzpatrick ==
Paula Fitzpatrick
- Hollyoaks character
- Portrayed by: Beth MacDonald
- Duration: 2004–2005
- First appearance: 30 November 2004
- Last appearance: 17 February 2005
- Introduced by: Jo Hallows
In-universe information
- Occupation: Student

Paula Fitzpatrick, played by Beth MacDonald, was a friend of Justin Burton (Chris Fountain), who briefly dated his step-brother Ali Taylor (Luti Fagbenle).
