= Nick O'Connor =

Fictional character from Hollyoaks

- Hollyoaks character
- Portrayed by: Darren Bransford
- Duration: 2001–2004
- First appearance: 17 September 2001
- Last appearance: 3 November 2004
- Created by: Jo Hallows
In-universe information
- Occupation: Student

Nick O'Connor is a fictional character from the British soap opera Hollyoaks, played by Darren Bransford. The character debuted on-screen during the episode broadcast on 17 September 2001. Bransford made his finale appearance as Nick during the episode broadcast on 3 November 2004.

== Development ==
Bransford was cast in the role of Nick in 2001. Bransford made his debut on-screen appearance as Nick during the episode broadcast on 17 September 2001. A writer from the official Hollyoaks website described Nick as a "wacky, gregarious and sensitive" character. Nick arrives to attend the Hollyoaks Community College studying Graphic Design and later graduates to his second year. The character's style was changed and the wardrobe department started to dress Nick in hats. Bransford was delighted with the change because he could have messy hair and just take a hat from the department. Bransford later told an All About Soap reporter that "to be honest, Nick's a bit of a whinger! I could never share a flat with him as he nags to much. But I'd be his friend. Nick is a good laugh and he'd support you if you ever needed him or wanted some help with anything - he's the kind of guy you can trust."

Nick is portrayed as a gay character. In one of Nick's early storylines he is the victim of a brutal assault and he blames his sexuality as a motivation. Nick does not know the identity of his attacker which prompts him to hide in his flat. He decides to hide his flamboyant personality and removes posters of men from his walls. His friend, Eve Crawford (Natasha Lund) suspects that Jamie Nash (Stefan Booth) is the attacker, but Becca Hayton (Ali Bastian) provides him with a false alibi.

Writers created a close friendship between Nick and Jodie Nash (Kate McEnery). Despite being openly gay, Nick struggles to except his sexuality. John Kelly from Wicklow People revealed Nick refuses to tell his parents he is gay. Nick then uses Jodie as a "rent a girlfriend" and she poses as his partner around them. In one storyline, Nick announces he is actually heterosexual and uses it as a reason not to tell his parents. Jodie is also upset with Nick for never attempting to pursue her romantically.

On 28 March 2004, Martin Coutts from the Daily Mirror reported that Hollyoaks would undergo a large cast change over overseen by the show's creator Phil Redmond. Numerous cast members were listed as those not having their contracts renewed. Bransford was amongst those affected. A Hollyoaks publicist told Coutts that "much of the action centres on Hollyoaks College, and naturally students leave." Bransford made his finale appearance as Nick during the episode broadcast on 3 November 2004.

== Storylines ==
Nick arrives as a fresher with best friend Jodie. He is immediately involved in controversy when he is attacked outside The Dog in The Pond for being gay. Nick copes well with the situation due to the support of Jodie. Nick begins dating Greg, whom he meets at a gay club, but he ends the relationship when Nick discovers that he was two-timing him. Nick goes on to become confused about his sexuality after he has doubts about being gay.

With Jodie upset over the death of her brother, Jamie, Nick tries to comfort her and the pair end up sleeping together. Jodie leaves Hollyoaks to clear her head, and Nick begins to date Nathan Rogers, who works at Il Gnosh. When Jodie returns, the pair decide to be just friends. Nick realises that he feels comfortable with his homosexuality due to him having strong feelings for Nathan. However, Nick's parents do not know about his sexuality. Nathan encourages Nick to come clean and the pair go together to Nick's farmhouse to tell them the truth. However, Nick's father's reaction is bad, and he forces Nick and Nathan out of the house. This leaves Nick shattered and terribly upset, despite Nathan trying to comfort him.

Nick's mother phones Nick to tell him that his father has just had a heart attack. Nick rushes to his bedside, and his father tells him that the farm is not doing well and that he needs an extra pair of hands. Nick decides to help his father out. Nathan has plans to go on holiday, but Nick decides he has to help his father due to his condition. Nathan is frustrated by this and asks Nick to choose between him and his parents. Nathan ends up breaking up with Nick, which leaves him devastated. Trying to make a success of his life, Nick completes a degree in arts and wants to travel around the world. However, his father has other plans as he wants Nick to run the farm. Once again, Nick has to choose between his choice and his parents, but this time Nick thinks it is best for him to do what he wants to do. Bidding a farewell to Hollyoaks, Nick leaves feeling free and being able to do whatever he wants to do.

== Reception ==
Sam Soap writing for Inside Soap magazine opined that Nick, Dannii Carbone (Christina Baily) and Kristian Hargreaves (Max Brown) never had any storylines when they moved into their flat. He added that he was past caring about what the forgotten character did. The magazine's Lucy Lather later revealed her delight at Nick's departure. She stated "'Artist' Nick O'Connor finally packing his paintbrush and leaving Hollyoaks. I'll miss him about as much as a dog would miss fleas." A television critic from Sunday Life branded Nick "camper than a row of pink tents and 100 per cent gay." Karen Dunn from Soaplife included Nick's attack in the magazine's "hot plots" feature. She assessed that the attack left him with a "crushed spirit" and he "lost all enthusiasm for camping it up in public, and even behind closed doors." An All About Soap writer branded Nick a "sensitive student" but noted it was unwise to trust his help with matters of love.
