= List of Hollyoaks characters introduced in 2006 =

The following is a list of characters that first appeared in the Channel 4 soap opera Hollyoaks in 2006, in order of first appearance.

== Mike Barnes ==
Mike Barnes is a fictional character from the soap opera Hollyoaks, played by famous Coronation Street actor, Tony Hirst.

== Wayne Tunnicliffe ==
Wayne Tunnicliffe
- Hollyoaks character
- Portrayed by: Joe Marsden
- Duration: 2006–2007
- First appearance: 10 February 2006
- Last appearance: 1 October 2007

Wayne Tunnicliffe, played by Joe Marsden, made his first appearance in 2005. He was introduced as one of Ste Hay's friends. Ste was interested in Amy Barnes, while Wayne dated Michaela McQueen. Wayne was only interested in her because she was "easy" and after a few months he dumped her via text message.

Wayne and Ste befriended Josh Ashworth and his cousin Fletch to get close to Josh's sister Hannah Ashworth (they gave up because Hannah was always out with friends). A nastier moment arrived when Ste and Wayne began bullying Nicole Owen after her brother Sam blew up the Dog in the Pond. They eventually pretended to care about her, taking her to the woods, getting her drunk, and planning to rape her. She threw herself on the ground, sobbing and telling them to get on with it, and they left her alone.

Ste was sent to a juvenile detention facility for his part in a joyride which sent Amy to hospital. Wayne was next seen in spring 2007, hanging out with Sonny Valentine. Wayne soon discovered that his ex, Michaela, fancied Sonny so he mentioned it to Sonny, not knowing that he and Michaela were secretly going out. Wayne made fun of Michaela to Sonny behind her back and Sonny went along with it to keep their relationship a secret, but when Wayne went too far insulting Michaela, Sonny stood up to him and told him that he and Michaela were dating. Wayne also taunted her about her gay brother, John Paul McQueen, only for John Paul to grab him and threaten him into leaving Michaela alone.

Wayne began selling his little brother's ADD medication at school. Nancy Hayton, who needed pills to cope with her hectic life, began buying them. When Wayne ran out of medication, she lost her temper. Wayne promised her he would get more and he tried to ask Nancy out. Wayne got cinema tickets but Nancy ripped them up, enraged that Wayne would not get the drugs in time for her next exams.

Wayne was last seen at a house party thrown by Amy and Michaela. Wayne stole food and CDs and when Amy caught him in baby Leah's room, a drunk Wayne grabbed Leah as a hostage. Wayne's former mate Ste grabbed the baby and punched Wayne before throwing all the partygoers out of the house.

== Willamina Webster ==
Willamina Webster
- Hollyoaks character
- Portrayed by: Christine Mackie
- Duration: 2006–2008
- First appearance: 20 February 2006
- Last appearance: 16 January 2008
In-universe information
- Occupation: Headmistress
- Sons: Pete Webster

Willamina Webster also known as Mrs. Webster was the head teacher at Hollyoaks High School. She spoke to Nancy Hayton when she was struggling in school due to her sister Becca Dean's murder, and later when Nancy accused of sexual harassment. Mrs. Webster's son Pete Webster worked as a teacher and sexually harassed Tina McQueen in October 2007. Tina told Mrs. Webster, who made her son apologise. Pete later tried to force himself on Tina, fired her, and was humiliated by her sister Jacqui McQueen. In January 2008, following Michaela McQueen's overdose, she performed a spot check of all the students' lockers for drugs. She almost uncovered Fletch's drugs in his locker, but was stopped by the fire alarm.

In June 2008 she was involved in the story about Josh and Michaela cheating in their coursework. They both eventually were suspended for a week. In addition, Sasha Valentine and Fletch stole her laptop to sell for drugs but it was eventually returned. During both of these events, Mrs Webster never made an appearance.

Mrs. Wesbter was not seen on-screen again because, in November 2008, Govinda Roy, the father of Ravi Roy, Ash Roy, Anita Roy and Leila Roy, debuted as the new headmaster at Hollyoaks High.

== Diane Valentine ==
Diane Valentine
- Hollyoaks character
- Portrayed by: Pauline Black
- First appearance: 17 July 2006
- Last appearance: 20 July 2006
In-universe information
- Sisters: Adeola
- Husband: Leo Valentine (until 2006)
- Sons: Calvin Valentine; Sonny Valentine
- Daughters: Sasha Valentine

Diane Valentine and her three children Calvin, Sonny and Sasha Valentine bought the home of Liz Burton and their arrival started off inauspiciously when they had to forcibly remove Liz's daughters Sophie and Mel Burton. Diane was proud of Calvin, although she was upset about his plans to leave home once he graduated from the police force. Sonny was involved in various criminal activities Diane knew nothing about. Sasha was the youngest of the family and coping with growing up.

Diane's stay in town was short-lived, on her way to her car, she dropped her keys. When she bent over to pick them up, she didn't see Jake Dean's car driving towards her and she was hit and killed.

Diane's death shattered her family, as her husband Leo Valentine showed up to try to pick up the pieces and keep the family together.

== Eddie Griffiths ==
Eddie Griffiths
- Hollyoaks character
- Portrayed by: Che Watson
- Duration: 2006, 2008–2010
- First appearance: 18 July 2006
- Last appearance: 5 March 2010
In-universe information
- Occupation: Teacher

Edward "Eddie" Griffiths was played by actor and musician Che Watson from 2006 to 2010

Eddie is a police officer and works alongside Calvin Valentine. Eddie first appeared in 2006, when Calvin was going to move in with him. Calvin then decided not to after the death of his mother. In 2008, Eddie found drugs in Calvin's coat pocket after seeing him with Nige. The following day, Eddie confronted Calvin and told him that he was going to report him to Superintendent Lacey, but Calvin later convinced him not to.

He returned on 15 September 2008, during a routine search of The Loft. On 5 February 2009, it was revealed that he had been promoted to sergeant, although on 6 April 2010 he wore a Constable's uniform.

== Foz ==
Foz
- Hollyoaks character
- Portrayed by: Benjamin Hart
- Duration: 2006–2007
- First appearance: 31 August 2006
- Last appearance: 2 January 2007
In-universe information
- Mother: Willow

"Foz" was the boyfriend of Nancy Hayton. He is a tattooist and was working in a tattoo parlour when Nancy met him. Foz is a counter-stereotype; although heavily tattooed and pierced, he is actually philosophical, peaceful and artistic. He painted a 'realistic' memorial to those who died in The Dog fire, to the dismay of the bereaved Justin Burton. After losing the premises to his tattoo parlour, Foz decided to go back to college and he became a part-time lecturer and MA student at Hollyoaks Community College. He has a free spirited New Age mother (Willow) who made a brief appearance. According to Willow, she spent Foz's childhood taking him touring round circus and women's camps.

As of 2 January 2007, Foz has left Hollyoaks as a result of a higher calling; to serve and assist the impoverished of Goa. Nancy had agreed to go with him, but changed her mind at the last minute. They said they loved each other, and Foz said maybe he'd run into her somewhere in the world someday. His final words were, "Take care."

== Davey Thomas ==
Davey
- Hollyoaks character
- Portrayed by: Alex Preston
- Duration: 2006–2007
- First appearance: 19 October 2006
- Last appearance: 9 March 2007

"Davey Thomas" was the boyfriend of a con Jacqui McQueen met in prison. He first appeared when he demanded £10,000 from Jacqui which she had got from a men's public bathroom after doing a favour for her mate in prison with help from her sister Mercedes. On their way out they accidentally dropped the vase the money was in which meant them taking the money back to their house. When Carmel McQueen found out about the money she stole £4,000 of the money to get her boobs done. When Davey found out about this he demanded his other £6,000. Mercedes' boyfriend Russ Owen and Jacqui's mother Myra McQueen gave him what they had, but it was still not enough. Several months later, he returned, demanding Jacqui marry Albanian immigrant Aleksander Malota. Jacqui refused, but eventually gave in. On her wedding day, she again changed her mind, but Davey showed up at the wedding. During a fight with Jacqui's boyfriend Tony Hutchinson, Jacqui knocked Davey out, but when he woke up, he informed her that they were both now in debt to very powerful people who would hurt her and her family. Jacqui relented and married Aleksander. When they split up several months later, with Aleksander returning to Albania, there were no apparent consequences.

== Ricky Bowen ==
Ricky Bowen
- Hollyoaks character
- Portrayed by: Simon Cassidy
- First appearance: 12 December 2006
- Last appearance: 20 December 2006
In-universe information
- Sons: Richard Bowen
- Daughters: Carmel Valentine; Michaela McQueen

Richard "Ricky" Bowen is the father of McQueen siblings Carmel and Michaela McQueen. Ricky had a relationship with Myra McQueen and became stepfather to her three daughters Jacqui, Mercedes, and Tina. Ricky went on to have two more children with Myra, daughters Carmel and Michaela. While he was away with his band, Myra slept with Iain Naimsmith, before Iain began his transition to being a woman named Sally St. Claire. When Rickey returned Myra lied to Ricky and John Paul and said John Paul was Ricky's son. After youngest daughter Michaela was born, Ricky left Myra and the children for their next door neighbour, 17-year-old daughter Heather McCallister, who later gave birth to his son Richard. Ricky came in and out his children's lives. Carmel and John Paul learned not to trust their father, but Michaela wanted a chance to get to know him. She managed to get Ricky's number and he came to visit her. He told her he wanted to make up for the past, but while they were alone in the house, Ricky convinced Michaela to go out to the store. While she was gone, Ricky stole the family's Christmas gifts, liquor, and television, leaving Michaela heartbroken.

== Charlie Dean ==
Charlie Dean
- Hollyoaks character
- Portrayed by: Joshua McConville (2006–2010); Charlie Behan (2011–2026)
- Duration: 2006–2026
- First appearance: Episode 1935; 21 December 2006
- Last appearance: 8 June 2026
- Introduced by: Bryan Kirkwood (2006); Paul Marquess (2011); Hannah Cheers (2024)
- Spin-off appearances: Hollyoaks Later (2012, 2025)
In-universe information
- Other names: Charles Adam Dean
- Father: Justin Burton
- Mother: Becca Hayton
- Adoptive father: Darren Osborne
- Adoptive mother: Nancy Hayton
- Stepfather: Jake Dean
- Siblings: Oscar Osborne (adoptive); Morgan Osborne (adoptive); JJ Osborne (adoptive); Frankie Osborne (adoptive); Phoenix Hathaway (adoptive)
- Grandfathers: Charles Hayton; Jack Osborne (adoptive)
- Grandmothers: Margaret Hayton; Liz Burton
- Aunts: Nancy Hayton; Mel Burton; Sophie Burton
- First cousins: Oscar Osborne; Morgan Osborne

Charlie Dean (also Osborne), played by Charlie Behan between 2011 and 2026, is the son of Becca Hayton (Ali Bastian) and Justin Burton (Chris Fountain), Becca gave birth to him after being sentenced to imprisonment after alleged under-age activity with Justin. After Charlie was born, it was unknown whether Justin or her husband Jake Dean (Kevin Sacre) was his father. Becca originally gave Charlie to Jake, but when Justin firsts meets Charlie after stealing Jake's car Justin realizes he is the father. Jake's sister Steph Dean (Carley Stenson) convinced Jake to take a paternity test in January 2007, but Jake destroys the results and assumed the role of Charlie's father, along with his wife and Becca's sister, Nancy Hayton (Jessica Fox). In February 2007, Becca was stabbed in prison, and dies afterwards, and Charlie never got a chance to see her.

In August 2024, it was reported that Behan had left Hollyoaks, The news came amid the announcements that several other cast members would be leaving the soap due to Hollyoaks having to reduce the number and duration of their weekly episodes. Some viewers expressed unhappiness and confusion on social media over the news of Behan's departure. His final appearance aired in the episode originally released on 11 September 2024. In November 2024, it was announced that Behan would return to the soap for a guest stint later that month. In September 2025, it was reported that Behan would reprise the role again on Hollyoaks later that month. Behan also portrayed Charlie in the Hollyoaks late-night special Hollyoaks Later for the soap's 30th anniversary, which was broadcast on 22 October of that year. The character was later written out again and Behan's exit aired on 8 June 2026, when Charlie was arrested for his role in a car crash.

In May 2006, Becca discovered that she was pregnant but was unaware of whether the father was Jake or Justin, whom she had been having an affair with. She initially kept the pregnancy from Justin, and let Jake believe that he was Charlie's father. However, in July 2006, Becca and Justin's affair was revealed and Jake realised that he may not be the father.

Becca chose Justin over Jake, but later changed her mind and went back to Jake, deciding that Jake would be the father, regardless of the paternity. Justin reported Becca to the police for their affair, and lied that they had begun a sexual relationship when Justin was 15. Becca was arrested and imprisoned, but in December 2006, she went into labour at her sentencing and gave birth to a son in hospital. She named the baby Charles, nicknaming him Charlie. Charlie stayed with Becca in prison. Justin eventually admitted to lying, and Becca was released. However, in February 2007, on the day she was released, Becca was stabbed by Fran Hathaway and she died in hospital.

In June 2008, Nancy took Charlie to the hospital, worrying about his high temperature. Charlie was diagnosed with leukaemia, and Jake was tested to see if he was a match for Charlie. Jake discovered that he was not a match, meaning that Justin was Charlie's father. Charlie underwent chemotherapy, which was delayed when he developed an infection. When Nancy left Jake after he attempted to rape her on their wedding night, Jake withdrew Nancy's visiting rights to Charlie, which lead Nancy to seek Justin's help to win custody of Charlie from Jake.

After Jake and Justin had a fight, Justin decided to help Nancy with the custody case, not wanting Charlie to be raised by Jake. Nancy and Jake continued to argue and fight, which resulted Nancy throwing Jake out of the flat, and Jake making Nancy appear to be an unfit parent. Outside the court room, Jake goaded Nancy into exploding at him and causing a scene. Jake was awarded custody, and revoked Nancy's visiting rights.

Jake held Charlie's christening the next day, choosing Steph and Darren Osborne (Ashley Taylor Dawson) to be Charlie's godparents. Nancy later revealed that Jake had tried to rape her on their wedding night, and her friends Sarah Barnes (Loui Batley) and Hannah Ashworth (Emma Rigby) convinced her to go to the police. Jake was arrested for attempted rape, but released. However, Steph backed up Nancy's story and Jake was exposed. Jake took Charlie in his car and drove to a remote location, attempting to kill himself and Charlie by gassing them in his car. Nancy was able to track them down and saved Charlie, but left Jake to die. However, Jake survived and came after Nancy. He attempted to take Charlie to France, but was arrested and admitted to a psychiatric hospital. Jake later confessed to the murder of Sean Kennedy (Matthew Jay Lewis) in exchange for Justin giving his parental rights to Jake's mother, Frankie Osborne (Helen Pearson).

In July 2009, Justin later went on the run, taking the blame for the fire at The Loft, saying goodbye to Charlie before his departure. Jake was later released from the psychiatric hospital, but Frankie was worried about Jake's mental health and decided to give Nancy parental rights. Charlie went missing in the care of Nancy's boyfriend, Kris Fisher (Gerard McCarthy), and everyone worried that he might have been with Jake, which he had not.

Darren and Nancy later got together, and married in a surprise ceremony in February 2012, meaning that Charlie was reunited with Jake's side of the family. In October 2012, Nancy also gave birth to a son, Oscar Osborne (Ralph & Zach Norman). In December 2012, Nancy began to struggle, however, and exploded at Charlie. Charlie, believing he was unwanted, ran away. Whilst out in the woods, Charlie slipped and knocked himself unconscious when he fell onto a tree branch. He was later discovered by Seamus Brady (Fintan McKeown) and rushed to hospital. However, Charlie had only minor injuries and was discharged not long later.

Darren and Nancy hired a nanny, Sienna Blake (Anna Passey). Sienna became obsessed with taking Nancy's place in the family. She managed to drive a wedge between Darren and Nancy, and Darren chose Sienna over Nancy. However, Charlie and Oscar preferred Nancy over Sienna. After Sienna framed Nancy for a fire at The Dog in the Pond, Nancy was seen as a danger to Charlie and Oscar.

In August 2013, Sienna later told Nancy to take Charlie and Oscar and leave. Nancy sped off with them in the car, whilst Sienna injured herself and told Darren that Nancy had attacked her and kidnapped Charlie and Oscar. Nancy panicked when she saw a police car and lead a police chase into the car park of the hospital. Nancy collided with another car, swerved and crashed through the brick wall. She managed to get both Charlie and Oscar out of the car before it fell, narrowly killing them. Nancy was arrested, upsetting Charlie.

Darren and Sienna decided to move out of 1 Stockton Lane, and tried to take Charlie with them. Frankie and her husband Jack Osborne (Jimmy McKenna) tried to stop them, but Sienna blackmailed Frankie over her knowledge of her affair with Darren's half-brother Ziggy Roscoe (Fabrizio Santino). In December 2013, Sienna later kidnapped Charlie, Oscar and Frankie's foster son Tom Cunningham (Ellis Hollins) when Nancy was released. She tried to gas them all in her car, but the police arrived and Sienna crashed whilst trying to flee. She was then arrested and Darren and Nancy eventually reconciled.

In October 2015, at the gay pride parade, Charlie witnessed Lindsey Roscoe (Sophie Austin) give Dr. Charles S'avage (Andrew Greenough) a fatal injection. Charlie was left traumatised and began having nightmares. Lindsey threatened Charlie, and he refused to speak to anyone. Nancy and Darren were concerned when Charlie began drawing dead people, and in January 2016, they eventually managed to get him to admit that he witnessed Lindsey murder Charles. However, in May 2016, Lindsey was murdered by Silas Blissett (Jeff Rawle) before facing prosecution.

In March 2017, Charlie discovered that Nancy had been researching multiple sclerosis, and worked out that she was ill with the disease. Charlie researched the disease and told Oscar that Nancy was dying, and also told Darren. Darren revealed to Nancy that Charlie knew about the illness, and Nancy told them the truth, leading to them all reconciling.

In September 2017, Darren was later arrested for drug dealing and served a prison sentence. Despite his insistence, Tom took Charlie to see Darren. In October 2017, Frankie died of a stroke, and in November 2017, Charlie and Oscar read out a eulogy at her funeral. In February 2018, whilst exploring the school, Charlie and Leah Barnes (Elà-May Demircan) almost discovered Lindsey's sister Kim Butterfield (Daisy Wood-Davis), who had been kidnapped by Ryan Knight (Duncan James), but were interrupted by Leah's adoptive father Ste Hay (Kieron Richardson).

In September 2018, Nancy and Darren split when Darren's affair with Mandy Morgan (Sarah Jayne Dunn) was revealed. Charlie eventually forgave Darren and tolerated Mandy's daughter, Ella Richardson (Erin Palmer). Meanwhile, in January 2019, he took a liking to Nancy's new boyfriend Kyle Kelly (Adam Rickitt). In October 2019, Charlie and Ella sneaked into the underground tunnels during the construction of Cunningham's Grande Bazaar, and were left trapped when the crane collapsed. However, they managed to escape. Charlie discovered that Nancy and Darren had slept together when they were trapped in the tunnels looking for Charlie and Ella, but Nancy confessed to Mandy not long afterwards in December 2019.

In January 2020, Charlie began to feel ignored by Nancy and Kyle when they had relationship problems following Nancy's miscarriage. Charlie began secluding himself, opting to spend all of his time playing video games. Charlie would occasionally play with Sid Sumner (Billy Price). However, unknown to Charlie, Sid's drug dealing cousin, Jordan Price (Connor Calland), would use Sid's account to get Charlie to think that he and Sid were friends.

In May 2020, Jordan later befriended Charlie, and asked him to hold onto a package. He then started getting Charlie to hold onto drugs, but Charlie found out and confronted Jordan. To Jordan's surprise, Charlie agreed to hold onto drugs for him, for a higher price. Kyle eventually discovered what Charlie was doing, and was torn between telling Nancy or trying to help Kyle secretly. Nancy and Kyle began having problems in their marriage and ended up splitting. In June 2020, Charlie was left distraught when Kyle took his own life following years of depression, which he had managed to keep hidden from his family. Under pressure from Jordan, Sid used the situation to manipulate a reluctant Charlie into dealing drugs for him. In October 2020, Charlie later helped Juliet Nightingale (Niamh Blackshaw) convince Ella to also deal drugs. On New Year's Eve 2020, Ella refused to smuggle drugs inside her body for dealer Victor Brothers (Benjamin O’Mahoney), so she and Charlie hid in The Hutch. They were found by Jordan, unaware that he was planning to help Juliet and Sid escape from Victor. Charlie grabbed Jordan's knife and stabbed him to defend himself, but Ella grabbed a knife from the kitchen and fatally stabbed Jordan.

In the aftermath, Charlie made an immediate false confession to PC George Kiss (Callum Kerr) and arrested. In January 2021, Charlie was not released on bail, and was informed by solicitor James Nightingale (Gregory Finnegan) that he could be facing seven years imprisonment. In March 2021, Charlie wrote a letter to Ella, explaining that he planned to tell the truth. The letter was used by Nancy as evidence to have Charlie released and Ella arrested. Charlie, however, omitted Mandy's involvement in his detaining. In August 2021, Ella was given a non-custodial sentence for Jordan's death, she moved into the Osborne’s house due to her strained relationship with Mandy. In September 2021, bonding over spending time in prison, Charlie and Ella began to grow close and embarked on a secret relationship, later exposed when Nancy mistakenly believed that Leah was Charlie's girlfriend. The pair ended up sleeping together, giving Ella a pregnancy scare. However, after babysitting Faith Hudson-Savage, Ella thought that she and Charlie were ready for a baby. She discovered that she was pregnant in December 2021 and informed Charlie at Christmas.

Nancy was furious at Charlie and Ella deciding to have a baby, but came round after trying to scare them off with a training doll. In March 2022, at her first scan, Ella was informed that her baby had no heartbeat and she had miscarried. Charlie struggled to cope with the news, blaming Ella, breaking up with her and destroying their memorial tree. Charlie eventually put things right, but rejected a reconciliation. In April 2022, feeling infantilised by his family and teachers, Charlie ended up confiding in Eric Foster (Angus Castle-Doughty), but turned on him when Eric attempted to indoctrinate him into his incel-ideologies.

Charlie soon befriended DeMarcus Westwood (Tomi Ade) but began bullying Mason Chen-Williams (Frank Kauer). In July 2022, after finding DeMarcus armed with a knife, intending to use it as defence against Joseph Holmes' (Olly Rhodes) gang, Charlie warned Saul Reeves (Chris Charles). In August 2022, DeMarcus ended up in prison when Joseph used the knife to stab Saul, but Charlie defended him and DeMarcus was eventually released. In December 2022, in order to raise funds for DeMarcus' girlfriend Vicky Grant's (Anya Lawrence) trip to Margate to visit her mother, DeMarcus threw a party at Charlie's house. Mason ended up leaking it on social media, and publicly shamed himself when he lied that he had slept with a drunken Leah.

In January 2023, Charlie's bullying of Mason escalated and he attempted to get Mason expelled from school. After learning that Mason had posted inappropriate photos of Leah online, he confronted Mason in the park and beat him unconscious. In February 2023, Charlie planned a leaving party for DeMarcus and Vicky when they planned to move to Margate, sneaking off into the woods. Vicky ended up overdosing on ecstasy from a drink Charlie and Leah had spiked to share, resulting in Vicky being moved away by social services and DeMarcus turning on the pair.

In March 2023, after Leah also rejected Charlie, he became enraged at being isolated from his friends and began purchasing weed from a drug dealer. He began acting up in school, leaving Nancy incensed as she became headteacher and was forced to expel him. In the heat of the moment, Nancy compared Charlie to Justin, leaving Charlie curious about him.

In January 2024, Charlie, Ella and their friends go to a rave, but Ella tries to tell Charlie that she still loves him. His girlfriend Shing Lin Leong (Izzie Yip) witnesses the two having a moment and accuse her of trying to kiss him, but Ella was just holding his hands. Charlie doesn't defend Ella, which upsets her and she leaves after an argument with them and Leah, who is highly intoxicated. Charlie and his friends find Ella in the woods drinking alone. After a confrontation with Leah, Charlie tries to tell Ella that he does feel the same way about her but she tells him that it is too late and that they can never be friends again and she walks away. As Charlie tries to find Ella when she leaves the woods, unbeknownst to him, a car accident takes place near the ring road around the corner from the woods. Ella is involved and has been severely injured and killed. Her father Warren Fox (Jamie Lomas) learns from Leela Lomax (Kirsty-Leigh Porter), who was at the scene that Ella is dead and he breaks down in tears, devastated. Charlie and the rest of the village soon learn of Ella's death and he grieves for her. Upon the arrival of Darren’s long-lost children JJ (Ryan Mulvey) and Frankie Osborne (Isabelle Smith), Charlie finds it difficult to grieve for Ella and moves out of the Osborne house temporarily. He continues with his apprenticeship and working for Dave Chen-Williams (Dominic Power) by repairing guttering in the village. In February 2024, when he learns that Frankie has accused Jack of inappropriately touching her, Charlie refuses to believe her and is disgusted with Darren for supposedly taking Frankie’s side. It soon becomes apparent that Jack never touched her and Frankie soon admits this to everyone but Charlie is not convinced and is still cold towards her and JJ.

The next few months pass and Charlie visits the Osbornes often. He manages to sell some of his stuff to earn some extra money as he wants to put towards some savings to go away on holiday for his 18th birthday later in the year. In May 2024, Frankie needs some new ballet shoes for her dance recital and Nancy can't afford to replace them, so Charlie, who feels bad for her, gives her some of the money he got from selling his stuff to replace the ballet shoes. Charlie and Frankie begin to develop a close friendship, as she wonders why he would want to help her after the way she treated everyone, including Jack. Charlie tells her that if Jack can move on then so can he and the two start hanging out occasionally. Charlie learns that Frankie is supposed to attend a dance audition at an academy in Manchester. Frankie has doubts that she might not be good enough but Charlie reassures her and encourages her to go to the audition. He reluctantly signs the consent form, forging Darren's signature as Frankie doesn't want Darren and her mother Suzanne Ashworth (Suzanne Hall) to know about the audition because they will stop her from going.

Towards the end of the summer, in August 2024, Charlie, the Osborne family and the rest of the village find out that Frankie has been sexually abused by JJ and Charlie realises that the abuse was the reason why Frankie accused Jack of doing what JJ had been doing to her for years. Charlie doesn't hold any grudges and doesn't treat Frankie any different after finding out the truth. Instead, he supports and protects her from JJ. When a motorbike accident leads to Suzanne's death, Charlie is there for Frankie as she grieves.

== Other characters ==
Character	Date(s)	Actor	Details
Declan	10 March 2006	Tim Smith	Declan was in charge of the group called Strawmen. Steph Dean (Carley Stenson) contacted him to see her boyfriend Cameron Clark (Ben Gerrard) for a spot in the band. Declan was very impressed and Cameron went off on a European tour he never returned from.
Brian Fletcher	5 April 2006	Craig Conway	Brian was a relationship counselor Sean Kennedy (Matthew Jay Lewis) went to see with estranged wife Louise Summers (Roxanne McKee). Their constant bickering convinced Brian that they were unsuitable as a couple, but Louise's anger over this pronouncement led her to a passionate kiss with Sean.
Tommy McIntyre	11 April 2006	Ash Tandon	Tommy was selling clothes in the SU Bar when Joe Spencer (Matt Milburn) and friend Jez browsed through his items. Tommy liked Joe's jacket, which Joe had designed himself, and purchased from him, planning to sell.
Police Officer	11 April 2006	Loveday Smith	A police officer who arrested Jessica Harris (Jennifer Biddall), Olivia Johnson (Rochelle Gadd), and Tony Hutchinson (Nick Pickard) for a naked protest at Il Gnosh.
John Peabody	5 July 2006	Robin Savage	John Peabody was a lecturer at HCC. It was during one of his classes that everyone learned Gilly Roach (Anthony Quinlan) was only pretending to be a student.
Scotty	26 July–14 August 2006	Matthew Ganley	Scotty appeared in four episodes. He worked for Warren Fox (Jamie Lomas), involved in tasks such as beating up a man who owed Warren money.
Carl	14 August 2006	Ian McHale	Carl owed Warren Fox (Jamie Lomas) money, but could only pay him some part. Louise Summers (Roxanne McKee) witnessed the tense exchange, and later saw Scotty beating and threatening Carl. She called the police.
Shane	14 August 2006	Graeme Dalling	Shane was the cause of a car accident. Calvin Valentine (Ricky Whittle), who had recently lost his mother in a car accident, was one of the first cops at the scene, and intimidated Shane to the point where he fled. Calvin caught up with him and jumped him, but before anything else could happen, Calvin's partner Eddie separated them.
Penny Hathaway	17–18 August 2006	Tara Daniels	Penny worked at Zedek, a market research company Mel Burton (Cassie Powney) briefly worked for. At the end of Mel's first day, Penny asked her to join the group for a drink. Mel reluctantly agreed, and soon got completely drunk, berating her co-workers as they left the restaurant. The next day, Penny fired Mel, who had no memory of what had happened, and told her where to get her money.
Jonathan Winrow	17 August 2006	Andrew Hinton Brown	Jonathan was a reporter for the Chester Herald. He interviewed Gilly Roach (Anthony Quinlan) after Gilly stopped a robbery.
Mrs. Temple	27 October 2006	Julie Goodyear	Mrs. Temple ran the Homely Private Hotel, temporary home of the Dean family after The Dog in the Pond public house burned down. During their six-week stay at the B&B, they managed to break every rule. Mrs. Temple finally threw them out after Darren Osborne (Ashley Taylor Dawson) accidentally walked in on Steph Dean (Carley Stenson) whilst she was in the shower. Mrs. Temple lusted after Jake Dean (Kevin Sacre) and told him he could stay on as a handyman if he wanted.
Willow	30–31 October 2006	Marella Oppenheim	When Nancy Hayton (Jessica Fox) thought her boyfriend Foz (Benjamin Hart) was cheating on her, she tracked him down, only to find him talking to his mother, Willow. Willow was a self-described "New Age traveller" who'd dropped into town for a visit. She had taken Foz from place to place throughout his childhood, always championing the causes she believed in, and she felt her son had sold out. In spite of their sparring, mother and son cared about each other. Willow talked to Nancy about self-empowerment and encouraged her to fight for her sister Becca's (Ali Bastian) freedom. After telling Foz about her new lover and getting Foz to agree to a visit, she returned home.
Joe Jones	13–15 November 2006	Steven Cabra	Debbie Dean (Jodi Albert) got her sister Steph Dean (Carley Stenson) an audition for famous rock star Joe Jones. Joe was more interested in bedding Steph. He led her to believe they had a future together, only to be gone by the time she woke up the next morning. Steph got her revenge by selling her story to a tabloid.
