= Russ Owen =

UK soap opera character, created 2004

- Hollyoaks character
- Portrayed by: Stuart Manning
- Duration: 2004–2009, 2018
- First appearance: 6 August 2004
- Last appearance: 16 November 2018
- Introduced by: Jo Hallows (2004); Bryan Kirkwood (2018)
In-universe information
- Occupation: Bartender; Teacher; Former pornographic film actor; Landlord
- Father: Rob Owen
- Mother: Carrie Owen
- Brothers: Sam Owen
- Sisters: Nicole Owen
- Wife: Mercedes McQueen (2007–2008, 2018)
- Sons: Max McQueen
- Stepsons: Bobby Costello

Russ Owen is a fictional character in the Channel 4 soap opera Hollyoaks, played by Stuart Manning. He first appeared in the episode first broadcast on 6 August 2004 with the Owen family and has been involved in storylines including being diagnosed with testicular cancer and kidnapping his son Max McQueen (Gabriel Lawrence). It was announced in April 2009 that Manning had quit the role and Russ departed in the episode first broadcast on 3 June 2009. Nine years later, it was confirmed that Manning would reprise the role. Russ returned on 13 August 2018 and was killed off on 16 November 2018 after being murdered by Breda McQueen (Moya Brady).

== Creation and development ==
Regular auditions were held in 2004 for the part of Russ, with actor Stuart Manning securing the role.

In 2009, it was revealed Manning had quit. Speaking of his decision to leave the show, Stuart Manning said: "I've had a great time at Hollyoaks over the last five years and I've learnt so much. Russ has been a fantastic character and he's had some great storylines which have been great fun to play - but there's also been lots of hard work! I'll obviously be sad to leave as I've worked with some great people but I'm really looking forward to getting stuck into new projects." Series producer Lucy Allan also commented on Manning's decision, stating: "Stuart has been a valued member of cast over the last five years. Russ has gone through some pretty rough times and this story sees the straw that breaks the camel's back. We feel that this is the just and fitting end to a character that has shown great diversity and been pushed so far. We'd all like to wish Stuart all the best in the future." The departure of Russ from the series followed fellow cast members Jamie Lomas, Chris Fountain and Emma Rigby's decisions to leave their roles of Warren Fox, Justin Burton and Hannah Ashworth respectively. Russ left the village on 3 June 2009 after kidnapping his son, Max McQueen, from the McQueen family.

=== Reintroduction ===
On 31 May 2018, it was announced that Russ would return to the series and Manning would return to filming in summer 2018. Manning agreed to reprise the role after deciding it was "the right time to come back". He looked forward to exploring his character nine years later and to "return as a different actor to who I was back then."

== Storylines ==
=== 2004−2009 ===
Russ as he appeared in his first stint.

Russ first appears as a new student at Hollyoaks Community College, joining his family: mother Carrie Owen (Jaq Croft), brother Sam Owen (Louis Tamone) and sister Nicole Owen (Ciara Janson). He befriends Ben Davies (Marcus Patric) and Darren Osborne (Ashley Taylor Dawson). When Darren owes money to thug Scott Anderson (Daniel Hyde), he, Russ and Ben are tied up and gagged by Scott's friends. Russ is diagnosed with testicular cancer. He becomes depressed and seeks out his father, Rob Owen (David Prosho). Russ has an operation to remove the cancerous testicle and replace it with a prosthetic one. Afterwards, Russ begins a relationship with Dannii Carbone (Christina Baily), but when Russ does not believe that she has been raped by Andy Holt (Warren Brown), they separate. Andy is a serial rapist and kidnaps and attempts to rape Nicole. Andy then attacks Russ, who comes to rescue his sister, with a metal pole as Sam looks on, although Andy dies after impaling himself on a spike and Sam is arrested after being convicted of rape. Russ starts a relationship with Sophie Burton (Connie Powney), despite her having been raped by Sam. Sam escapes the police and disappears and Russ later begins an affair with Mercedes McQueen (Jennifer Metcalfe). Sam returns to get revenge on Sophie and sets fire to The Dog in the Pond public house. Russ discovers that Sophie is in the fire while spending time with Mercedes; he rushes to the pub, where he finds Sam dying after an explosion destroys The Dog. Russ manages to save Sophie, but she later dies in his arms from smoke inhalation. Russ refuses to attend Sam's funeral, but is a pallbearer at Sophie's funeral, where he makes a speech. When Sophie's brother, Justin Burton (Chris Fountain), discovers Russ' affair, he attacks him, although they resolve their feud and Russ helps Justin with his grief.

Russ' family leaves the village following Sam's murder spree, but Russ stays and starts a public relationship with Mercedes. They become engaged and plan to share a wedding with Mercedes' sister, Tina McQueen (Leah Hackett), and her partner, Dominic Reilly (John Pickard). Mercedes has sex with Warren Fox (Jamie Lomas) on her hen night, which is exposed by Louise Summers (Roxanne McKee) at the wedding. Mercedes convinces Russ to continue with the wedding, but they separate after their honeymoon. Russ and Carmel McQueen (Gemma Merna), Mercedes' sister, grow close, but decide not to date for Mercedes' sake. Tina begins getting sexually harassed by her boss, Pete Webster (Richard Cambridge), and Russ saves Tina from being raped by Pete. Later, they have sex, which they agree to conceal. Tina later discovers that she is pregnant and decides to give the child to Jacqui McQueen (Claire Cooper) and her partner, Tony Hutchinson (Nick Pickard). Tina later realises that it is Russ' child, but does not tell him; she gives birth to a son, Max McQueen (Brayden Haynes-Mawdsley). Russ meets Caroline Cooper (Kari Corbett) and as they prepare to leave the village together, Tina reveals that Russ is Max's father. Russ stays in the village and he and Tina start dating, but they quickly end their relationship. Tina is later killed in an explosion caused by Niall Rafferty (Barry Sloane), but Jacqui decides to raise him, refusing Russ access.

Russ begins living with Nancy Hayton (Jessica Fox) and Ravi Roy (Stephen Uppal) and is shocked when Ravi tries to kiss him. Russ and Nancy become romantically involved and he suggests that they leave the country with Max and Nancy's nephew, Charlie Dean (Joshua McConville). Nancy dislikes the suggestion and their relationship ends when Russ finds Nancy having sex with Kris Fisher (Gerard McCarthy). Russ visits Sophie's grave and speaks to Justin; Russ then decides to leave with Max. Russ visits Max while Carmel is babysitting him and kidnaps him. Carmel sees this, but lets Russ leave. Russ asks Nancy to leave with him, but she refuses, so he leaves alone. On his way, he sees Justin, who is trying to escape the police, and offers him a lift to wherever he is going. Justin accepts and they drive away with Max. Jacqui is devastated when she realises Russ has left with Max. Months later, Russ sends Jacqui a postcard saying that Max is well and that he is sorry for taking him.

=== 2018 ===
Nine years later, Russ returns at Mercedes' hen party in Magaluf, where it emerges that he is her fiancé and a millionaire. Mercedes' mother, Myra McQueen (Nicole Barber-Lane), disapproves of their engagement and struggles to forgive him for taking Max. Mercedes persuades her to forgive him, but Myra plans to turn Russ against Mercedes. She pays Goldie McQueen (Chelsee Healey) to kiss Russ, but Goldie reveals this. Goldie then discovers that Russ is a former pornographic film actor, enraging Mercedes who cancels their wedding. Mercedes secretly has sex with Sylver McQueen (David Tag) and reconciles with Russ the following day. Mercedes is arrested by the police for the murder of Carl Costello (Paul Opacic), although she is released without charge. D.S. Roxy Cassidy (Lizzie Stavrou), the detective in charge of Carl's murder investigation, suggests to Russ that Mercedes is a serial killer and has killed her previous husbands, leaving Russ paranoid for his safety. Russ confronts Mercedes and she ends their engagement, upset that he could believe that she is capable of murder. As an apology and to prove his love for Mercedes, Russ purchases The Dog in the Pond for her as a gift. They reconcile and move into the pub with Max and Mercedes' son, Bobby Costello (Jayden Fox). Russ soon suspects that something is happening between Mercedes and Sylver and expresses his fears to Goldie, Russ and Goldie have sex and are almost caught by Mercedes the next morning. Goldie then discovers she is pregnant by Russ and when she tells Russ he tries to convince her to terminate the pregnancy as he doesn't want anything to spoil his life with Mercedes, Goldie seemingly complies and goes ahead with the termination. In November, Russ and Mercedes marry but things go wrong when the one-night stand is revealed by Goldie, as is her pregnancy that Russ convinced her to abort. The McQueens, especially Myra and Goldie's mother Breda McQueen (Moya Brady), are furious and Mercedes attacks Goldie. Russ attempts to talk to Mercedes in the village and almost fights with Sylver. Later, Mercedes tells Russ she never wants to see him again. Russ returns to workshop by The Dog and furiously destroys a some wooden furniture that Sylver had made. He sobs as he clutches a plaque in the shape of a heart, bearing the words "Russ & Mercedes." As this is happening, Breda creeps up behind Russ and hits him on the head with a hammer killing him, revealing herself to be a serial killer who also murdered Carl and Glenn Donovan (Bob Cryer). Mercedes is devastated when Russ' body is found and vows to make whoever was responsible pay. Mercedes is arrested for Russ' murder but is later released.

== Reception ==
Stuart Manning has been nominated for several awards for his portrayal of Russ, including the 'Sexiest Male' at the 2006 British Soap Awards. Russ' death won the accolade for Biggest OMG Soap moment at the 2018 Digital Spy Reader Awards. Virgin Media said "poor Russ Owen had a rough time of it." Citing several of his traumatic storylines they jested "no wonder he got the heck out of there."
