= Dannii Carbone =

UK soap opera character, created 2004

- Hollyoaks character
- Portrayed by: Christina Baily
- Duration: 2004–2007
- First appearance: 13 January 2004
- Last appearance: 8 June 2007
- Introduced by: Jo Hallows (2004); Bryan Kirkwood (2007)
In-universe information
- Occupation: Fashion designer

Dannii Carbone is a fictional character from the British television soap opera Hollyoaks, played by Christina Baily. She made her first appearance during the episode broadcast on 12 January 2004.

== Development ==
Baily was cast in the role of Dannii after attending her first-ever audition, following her graduation from drama school. Of her casting, she stated "I couldn't believe it – I've always been a fan of the show, but to get the role at my first attempt was unbelievable. But the cast have been fantastic, they've all helped me settle in." Baily made her debut appearance as Dannii on 12 January 2004. Baily later said she was "very lucky" to win the role of Dannii and enjoyed the acting, but she disliked having to do the "lads mags interviews".

The character makes "an instant impression" on the local residents as she arrives with minders, leading to speculation about "underworld" contacts and her mysterious family background. She also has a habit of walking around naked, causing an Inside Soap writer to note that she "looks like she's going to be a real handful." Weeks after her arrival, Dannii surprises the other characters by applying for a job at the new student union bar. Baily said "Nobody can believe Dannii wants a job in the bar, as she doesn't need the cash! But she doesn't want to miss out on anything!" Dannii is disappointed when Sophie Burton (Connie Powney) is placed in charge, but that makes her more determined to win control of the bar. Dannii gets Sophie drunk with the intention that Sophie will be too hungover to work the next day. Baily explained that her character is used to getting her own way and feels that she has the best leadership qualities. The actress also said the student union bar would become the new social centre of Hollyoaks and that she had a lot of scenes set there, including overseeing Rag Week, in which students take part in a number of competitions.

Dannii's flatmate Kristian Hargreaves (Max Brown) attempts to win her over, but despite the chemistry between them, Kristian has trouble convincing her to admit her feelings for him. Brown stated, "Dannii is a real queen bee and loves the attention she gets from Kristian. He decides to make her jealous, so she'll realise she fancies him – but his plan goes completely wrong and Dannii comes out on top." Dannii plays a trick on Kristian when he brags about having a one-night stand with Stacey Foxx (Jemma Keys). Brown said that Kristian is desperate to get rid of Stacey, but Dannii and Nick O'Connor (Darren Bransford) invite her to lunch, tease her and then repeatedly call Kristian's phone, which convinces him that Stacey is stalking him. Brown reckoned that there would be "fireworks" between Kristian and Dannii when he finds out what she has done.

== Storylines ==
Dannii was introduced as a wealthy fashion student at Hollyoaks Community College. She made her first appearance in Hollyoaks by arriving in a flashy car with blacked-out windows and a couple of mean-looking men by her side. She moved above Drive 'n' Buy with Nick O'Connor and Kristian Hargreaves, and attracted male attention.

The other characters jumped to the conclusion that her father is in the Mafia, but he was in fact just a rich Italian businessman. Furthermore, Dannii proved to them that she could stand on her own feet. and wasn't just a rich girl. She began to work at the Student Union Bar and fell for the charms of Russ Owen, her coworker she would begin to date. However, the romance takes a break when Russ discovers that he has testicular cancer, and Dannii shows her loyalty as she sticks by him. She also becomes close friends with Hall's roommate Joe Spencer, whom she offered support for throughout his troubles. Dannii and Russ got back together after a while, and their relationship seemed stronger.

In the late-night spin-off Hollyoaks: Crossing The Line, Dannii was invited to Lee Hunter's presidential party, where her drink was spiked by Andy Holt, who went on to rape her. The morning after, Dannii could not remember what had happened and confronted Andy, who told her she had slept with him. Russ's brother and Andy's best friend Sam overheard what had happened, and Dannii begged him to keep quiet.

Several months attacking Dannii, Andy spiked Louise Summers's drink at The Loft, but she was saved by Joe. Louise began to suspect she had been spiked and that a date rapist was on the loose. In response, she began a campaign at HCC called "what's in your drink." After noticing Dannii's change in personality and seeing her have a panic attack, Louise realised Dannii had been attacked. She helped Dannii to deal with it, but not before Andy attacked again.

When she confronted him with the truth, Andy refused to admit he had raped her. To make matters worse, Andy lied to her boyfriend, Russ, and told him that Dannii had seduced him. When Russ confronted her, an enraged Dannii told Russ that Andy had raped her. However, Russ believed Andy over Dannii, which caused their split. Russ and Andy had become friends through Sam, Russ's brother, who was in on the rapes with Andy.

After her split from Russ, Dannii attempted to jump off the roof of HCC, but Louise stopped her. Louise brought fellow rape victim Mel and her sister Sophie Burton along with her to prove to Dannii that they could band together and report Andy to the police. The four victims gave their statements to the police, but by that time, Andy had disappeared from Hollyoaks.

Dannii found support in her fellow victims and her friends, including Joe. Despite many attempts to recover from her rape, she decided it would be best for her to move back to Italy. Russ tried to stop her from going and asked her to marry him, but she was already set on returning to Italy. Russ confessed that he had accidentally killed Andy when he went to confront him about Dannii's accusation. Shocked, Dannii told him to go to the police. After a tearful goodbye to Russ, Dannii then left Hollyoaks in a taxi. Unbeknownst to Russ, Andy had actually survived.

Dannii returned to Hollyoaks in June 2007 after receiving a text message from her ex-lover Russ on his Mobile phone saying that he wanted her back. The message was, in fact, sent by Darren Osborne. She got to meet his fiancée, Mercedes McQueen, who was furious, believing that Russ still loved his ex-partner Dannii. Mercedes dumped pasta on her head. In the end, Russ pledged his loyalty to Mercedes, and Dannii left to work in a fashion house in Milan.

== Reception ==
While defending the newly introduced Hollyoaks characters, a columnist for Inside Soap expressed their love for Dannii, writing "Spoilt brat Dannii is fab – an Izzy Cornwell for the iPod generation".
