= Charlie Behan (actor) =

British actor and DJ (born 2004)

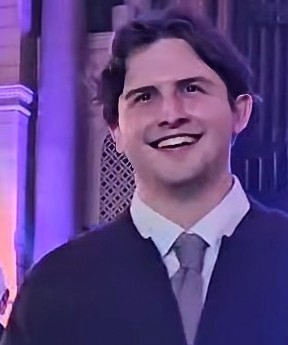
- Behan in 2025
- Born: October 2004 (age 21)
- Occupations: Actor; DJ
- Years active: 2010–
- Television: Hollyoaks

Charlie Behan (born October 2004) is a British actor and DJ. He has played the role of Charlie Dean on the British soap opera Hollyoaks between 2011 and 2026. For his role on the soap, he was nominated for "Best Young Performer" at the 2022 Inside Soap Awards.

== Life and career ==
Charlie Behan was born in October 2004. He is from Manchester. In 2010, Behan briefly played the guest role of Tré Davenport in the British soap opera Hollyoaks. The following year, six-year old Behan returned to the soap and took over the role of Charlie Dean from Joshua McConville. Originally a child cast member of the soap, Behan's appearances increased as the character became involved in more adult storylines. In 2015, Hollyoaks executive producer Bryan Kirkwood said that he was happy that Behan was "at the heart of the action at long last" due to Charlie being a witness of the Gloved Hand Killer, with Kirkwood calling Behan a "fantastic little actor". In late 2019, Behan was involved in the Hollyoaks County Line drugs storyline, which actress Jessica Fox was happy about due to Behan being one of the longest serving cast members on the soap. Behan was longlisted for "Best Young Performer" at the 2022 Inside Soap Awards for his role as Charlie. In 2023, Behan said that he was not considering leaving the soap, explaining, "I feel like Hollyoaks is my home. I don't think I should leave – and there's no need to go elsewhere when I've got all these big storylines... I've grown up here and it's all I've ever known". He also added that he liked doing storylines that were relevant to people his age, such as teenage drug use. That same year, the character was involved in a storyline which saw Charlie struggle with his mental health and attempt to kill himself, which led to Behan receiving praise from viewers. Behan did research and worked with charities for the storyline. The character's other storylines have included his anxiety and academic struggles and a love triangle between him, Ella Richardson (Erin Palmer) and Shing Lin Leong (Izzie Yip). Sarah Ellis called Behan a "star" that had "really come of age" amid the storyline of Charlie's mental health struggles.

In August 2024, it was reported that Behan had left Hollyoaks, with a source telling Digital Spy, "It's a sad time for [Behan's] co-stars as he was a popular cast member on set and had a great relationship with the other younger cast and his on-screen family, the Osbornes". The news came amid the announcements that several other cast members would be leaving the soap due to Hollyoaks having to reduce the number and duration of their weekly episodes. Prior to Behan's departure, it was noted by Digital Spy that Behan had been having less appearances. Some viewers expressed unhappiness and confusion on social media over the news of Behan's departure. His final appearance aired in the episode originally released on 11 September 2024. In November 2024, it was announced that Behan would return to the soap for a guest stint later that month. In September 2025, it was reported that Behan would reprise the role again on Hollyoaks later that month. In October 2025, it was reported that Behan would also portray Charlie in the Hollyoaks late-night special Hollyoaks Later for the soap's 30th anniversary, which was broadcast on 22 October of that year. The character was later written out again and Behan's exit aired on 8 June 2026, when Charlie was arrested for his role in a car crash.

In addition to acting, Behan is also a DJ.

== Personal life ==
Behan is friends with his Hollyoaks co-star Isabelle Smith, who plays Charlie's adoptive half-sister Frankie Osborne; Smith told Inside Soap that she enjoyed working with him and that she had known Behan for years, explaining, "We went to the same school and live two streets from each other! When I got the part on Hollyoaks I couldn't believe we were going to be playing siblings, it's such a small world!" In 2022, Behan was one of several Hollyoaks cast members that took part in charity football matches to raise money for blood cancer charity Myeloma UK.

== Filmography ==
Year	Title	Role	Notes	Ref.
2010	Hollyoaks	Tré Davenport	Guest role	
2011–2026	Hollyoaks	Charlie Dean	Regular role	
2025	Hollyoaks Later	Charlie Dean	Late night special	

== Awards and nominations ==
List of acting awards and nominations
Year	Award	Category	Title	Result	Ref.
2022	Inside Soap Awards	Best Young Performer	Hollyoaks	Longlisted	
