= Andy Holt (Hollyoaks) =

Fictional character from Hollyoaks

- Hollyoaks character
- Portrayed by: Warren Brown
- Duration: 2005–2006
- First appearance: 8 August 2005
- Last appearance: 16 February 2006
- Introduced by: Jo Hallows
- Spin-off appearances: Hollyoaks: Crossing The Line (2005); Hollyoaks: No Going Back (2005); Hollyoaks: Back from the Dead (2006)

Andrew "Andy" Holt is a fictional character from the British Channel 4 soap opera Hollyoaks, played by Warren Brown.

== Casting and creation ==
The role was played by Warren Brown for six months between 2005 and 2006. Brown made his first appearance as Andy on 8 August 2005. Although Brown was 27 years old and Andy was portrayed as a student, Brown's "youthful good looks" helped him gain the role, as it made it convincing that he was university student. Brown had not been to acting school and later said that the soap was "one big acting apprenticeship" for him, saying that he learnt a lot there. Years later, when speaking about his time on the soap, Brown said that he had a lot of fun, adding, "It was my first, long term job and I still have very fond memories and have many friends associated with Hollyoaks". Brown, who was raised in Cheshire, found it "quite surreal" working on the soap due to it being set in the same county, with the actor commenting, "I can't really say there are similarities between what happened in the story line and normal Cheshire life, as obviously Hollyoaks is a soap and something put together for people's entertainment. It should also be pointed out that the set of Hollyoaks is in Liverpool not Chester too!"

== Storylines ==
On his arrival at Hollyoaks Community College, Andy appeared to be a charming, easy-going student. However, a dark side soon emerged. Andy took Sam Owen under his wing having impressed Sam with his easy confidence with women. The pair quickly became inseparable as Sam became enthralled with Andy, to dangerous consequence.

In the late night special Hollyoaks: Crossing The Line, Andy spiked Dannii Carbone’s drink with GHB in order to rape her. The next morning Andy convinced Danni that she had slept with him consensually. Sam was upset that Andy had slept with Dannii since she was dating his brother Russ Owen but he was won over by Andy's defense that he was unaware of their relationship. Andy went on to rape a series of women by drugging their drinks and seemed invulnerable to detection.

Eventually he confessed his crime spree to Sam but managed to convince his friend that the rapes were harmless fun, and even persuade him to get involved.

In another late night special Hollyoaks: No Going Back Andy drugged both Mel and Sophie Burton, and invited Sam to rape Sophie. While Andy raped Mel in her own home, Sam decided not to go through with raping Sophie, but told Andy that he had. Andy's crimes began to unravel as Dannii and the Burtons realised they had been victims of rape. However, Andy seemed more concerned with Sam's betrayal than his imminent detection.

The two men were discussing Sam's lies on a remote quarry when Russ tracked them down, intent on revenge for Dannii's rape. A brawl ended in Andy's fall from the top of the quarry. Sam and Russ worried they had killed him but he survived and became bent on vengeance. In Hollyoaks: Back from the Dead, Andy kidnapped Sam and Russ's younger sister Nicole Owen on the pretence of a romantic weekend away.

The pair tracked Andy and Nicole to a warehouse in Southport Pleasureland but were beaten and tortured by Andy. Sam's part in the drugging of the Burton sisters was revealed before Andy began to rape Nicole. His attack was interrupted by Melanie Burton who had spotted Andy while on a trip with Sam "O.B." O'Brien and followed him. Mel drugged Andy and questioned him about his crimes and although he managed to escape, as he ran from Mel he impaled himself on a spike, Mel stood emotionless and watched him die.

Andy's legacy touched the village 7 months later, when Sam Owen started a fire in The Dog In The Pond to get back at Sophie Burton for turning him over to the police for his part in the rapes.

== Reception ==
For his portrayal of Andy, Brown was nominated for three British Soap Awards at the 2006 ceremony. In the viewer vote he was nominated for "Villain of the Year". He was also nominated for "Spectacular Scene of the Year" and "Best Exit".

Johnathon Hughes from Radio Times described the character an "evil rapist" who "met a sticky end". He cited Brown as one of several Hollyoaks actors who got their "big break" on the soap opera. Adam Beresford from Digital Spy called the character a "nasty piece of work" who had a "gruesome end". Beresford's colleague, Conor McMullan, called Andy's serial rape spree one of the soap's "darkest ever plots". Rachel McGrath from HuffPost included Brown in her list of the "sexiest" cast members in Hollyoaks.
