= Joseph Marsden =

English footballer

Joe Marsden
Personal information
- Full name: Joseph Thomas Marsden
- Date of birth: 11 October 1868
- Place of birth: Darwen, Lancashire, England
- Date of death: 17 January 1897 (aged 28)
- Position: Right back

Youth career
- Padiham

Senior career*
Years	Team	Apps	(Gls)
- Darwen
1891	Everton	1	(0)

International career
1891	England	1	(0)
- * Club domestic league appearances and goals

Joseph Thomas Marsden (11 October 1868 – 17 January 1897) was an English footballer who played for Darwen and Everton. He also earned one cap for the England national side in 1891.
