= Sam Owen =

UK soap opera character, created 2004

- Hollyoaks character
- Portrayed by: Louis Tamone
- Duration: 2004–2006
- First appearance: 2 August 2004
- Last appearance: 8 September 2006
- Introduced by: Jo Hallows
In-universe information
- Father: Rob Owen
- Mother: Carrie Owen
- Brothers: Russ Owen
- Sisters: Nicole Owen
- Nephews: Max Owen

Samuel Liam "Sam" Owen is a fictional character from the British Channel 4 soap opera Hollyoaks, played by Louis Tamone. He first appeared on 2 August 2004 and was introduced by producer Jo Hallows as a member of the Owen family comprising five new cast members. Tamone was axed in 2006 by the new producer Bryan Kirkwood and Sam was killed-off on 8 September during a fire ignited by him at The Dog in the Pond public house, which resulted in the deaths of five regular characters.

== Storylines ==
In August 2004 the Owen family arrive when they move to the Village. It soon emerges his real name is Sam Owen, but he is using a false name following his conviction for burning down his former girlfriend Jules' home; her younger brother had died in the fire. Jules had blamed him and her father for telling her to abort the baby she had conceived with Sam. The whole village turns against Sam following this revelation; Tony Hutchinson even questions keeping Sam on at Il Gnosh, where he works as a waiter. It eventually emerges that Sam is innocent of the charge and that the real arsonist is his girlfriend's father, who had set fire to the house as part of an insurance scam. For a long time he feels let down by his father Rob for not believing in him and tries to lead a clean-cut lifestyle because he feels that he had something to prove.

In part to redeem his reputation, Sam begins studying law at Hollyoaks Community College although his criminal record would make it impossible for him to practice. Sam passes his exams with flying colours, and is offered a work experience placement with a top law firm. At HCC, he attracts the attention of fellow student Zara Morgan. Sam even proves himself somewhat of a hero by saving Cameron Clark from a suicide attempt. Sam is a part of daredevil group at college, where he meets his old friend Andy Holt. Sam decides to study law at Hollyoaks Community College but this does not last long. In the late-night special Hollyoaks: Crossing The Line, he becomes a rapist, after being tempted by Andy, who revealed that he had raped Russ's girlfriend Dannii Carbone by using GHB (but tells him he does not know she was Russ' girlfriend until after). Andy convinces Sam that the drug is a short cut to sex from girls who are "gagging for it". Sam is disgusted with Andy when he finds out he raped and drugged the twins Sophie and Mel Burton. Andy chooses Mel and "gives" Sophie to Sam as a "present"; Sam ultimately cannot go through with it, however. Unaware that Sam had been there on the night of her sister's rape, Sam and Sophie begin going out.

Sam's refusal to rape Sophie results in Andy taking Sam to a cliff. Sam thinks they are going for another 'This way up' challenge, but Andy confronts Sam about not raping Sophie. Meanwhile, Dannii tells Russ that Andy raped her, and he goes looking for Sam. Russ eventually finds Sam and Andy, and a fight breaks out. The fight ends after Andy falls off the cliff and into the lake (presumably drowning). In a series of late night episodes, Andy returns to continue his assault on the Owens. When he kidnaps Nicole Owen, he lures Russ and Sam to an abandoned warehouse. When they get there Andy attacks them with a metal pole. Andy then reveals to both Nicole and Russ that Sam was also involved in the rapes. They are both shocked and disgusted. After Andy is killed. Russ and Nicole refuse to speak to Sam.

After Sam confesses to his parents, they gave him the chance to turn himself in. Sam tells them he needs to say goodbye to Sophie and he confesses to her his involvement in the rapes. Sophie then tricks Sam into turning himself in to the police. Although Sam recants his confession, he is convicted of raping unidentified girls and is sentenced to 25 years to life in prison. He tells his parents not to visit him. Four months later he begins writing to Nicole and sending her visiting orders, begging for forgiveness from his sister. Nicole goes to visit Sam and tells him that he had turned her life upside down, and refused to forgive him. Wracked with guilt, Sam attempts suicide in prison and is hospitalised. During his time in hospital, he escapes by holding Nicole hostage, and goes on the run. He later returns, determined to get revenge on Sophie for tricking him into confessing to the police. While forcing Nicole to tell him where Sophie is, he learns that she is now Russ's girlfriend. Sam heads to The Dog in The Pond, where he coats the pub in petrol before storming in to kill Sophie. Calvin Valentine smashes a glass over his head to try and stop him, as a result, he drops his lighter and the crowded pub blows up. Sam is badly injured and eventually dies under the rubble of the burning pub. Melanie Burton, Joe Spencer, Olivia Johnson and Mel's twin, Sophie are also killed.

== Reception ==
A writer from Inside Soap called Sam "Sophie's deranged ex".
