= Kristian Hargreaves =

- Hollyoaks character
- Portrayed by: Max Brown
- Duration: 2002–2004
- First appearance: 22 October 2002
- Last appearance: 30 July 2004
- Introduced by: Jo Hallows
In-universe information
- Occupation: Student

Kristian Hargreaves is a fictional character from the British soap opera Hollyoaks, played by Max Brown. The character debuted on-screen during the episode broadcast on 22 October 2002. Brown made his final appearance as Kristian during the episode broadcast on 30 July 2004.

== Casting ==
Max Brown had previously worked as an extra actor in "walk-on parts" in Hollyoaks and another Channel 4 soap opera, Brookside. Working as an extra on Hollyoaks was Brown's first television work. He was cast into the role of Kristian in 2004. Brown came to producers attentions when he originally auditioned for the role of Jake Dean, which Kevin Sacre secured. Kristian was introduced as one of four new male characters introduced in late 2002. Of joining the cast, Brown told Paul Brooks from Soaplife that "it's great. The cast are young and we have a lot of good comedy." Brown made his first appearance as Kristian during the episode broadcast on 22 October 2002. In 2003, Brown revealed he was content in staying with Hollyoaks for the foreseeable future.

== Development ==
Kristian is characterised as an "intelligent and charming student" who arrives in Hollyoaks to study molecular biology. A writer from the official Hollyoaks website revealed that Kristian is "intelligent, charming and witty, he's also prone to arrogance and appearing patronising." Brown said that Kristian was enjoyable to play because he is "so big-headed and arrogant". He also said that Kristian has a "dark side" because there have been situations he has found himself in which left viewers feeling unsure. Also admitting he had wanted the programme to explore Kristian's past and hoped it would be "dark".

In Kristian's backstory, both of his parents work as barristers. Brown told Soaplife's Brooks that Kristian is nineteen when he is introduced into the series. He is from a "wealthy family" and is portrayed as "a rebel who's very intelligent and self-assured". Brown revealed that Kristian is a cross between a hunk and a cad, he is "a flirt with all the female students, but he's also a bit of a cad with it, too." Kristian chose to study in Chester "as an act of rebellion" against his parents wishes. They wanted him to attend Oxford or Cambridge university. He lives up to his rebellious nature by flirting with fellow students and involving himself in "fun and games".

When Kristian is introduced into the series, he meets fellow student, Izzy Cornwell (Elize du Toit). She invites Kristian to live at Tony Hutchinson's (Nick Pickard) student accommodation flat. Izzy uses Kristian in an attempt to make Tony jealous during her feud with Tony's ex-girlfriend, Julie Matthews (Julie Buckfield). du Toit told an Inside Soap reporter that "Izzy thinks she can use this to her advantage, so she turns up there late one night with Kristian in tow. Tony sees straight through her and isn't jealous at all... Typical!" A writer from the official Hollyoaks website stated that from the impression Kristian makes on Izzy, it is "clear he's going to have a big impact on the lives of the locals - and not just the females." Kristian later has casual sex with Izzy, but writers did not develop it further. Brown told Brooks (Soaplife) that was "some pretty dramatic stuff" planned for his character's 2002 festive stories. One of his first notable storylines features Kristian involvement in a potholing accident. The scenes were filmed on location in Snowdonia. A spokesperson for the serial described the scenes as "life and death situations". While in another, Kristian is paired with Lisa Hunter (Gemma Atkinson). Brown said it was a "steamy romance" which leads Kristian into trouble.

It 2004, it was reported by Martin Coutts from Daily Mirror that producers were considering writing Kristian out of the series, along with several other characters. Brown made his finale appearance as Kristian during the episode broadcast on 30 July 2004.

== Storylines ==
Kristian arrives in Hollyoaks as a student studying molecular biology at Hollyoaks Community College. Kristian moves into Tony's student house, but when Tony decides to sell up, Kristian has to move to Nick O'Connor (Darren Bransford) and Jodie Nash's (Kate McEnery) flat. Kristian gains female attention from Izzy, Becca Hayton (Ali Bastian), and Jodie.

Kristian organises a potholing trip, which ends in disaster when both Theo Sankofa (Andrew Somerville) and Jamie Nash (Stefan Booth) die. After recovering, Kristian enters a ‘Big Brother’ style reality show where he attracts many teenage girls, including Lisa. Soon, Lisa has a crush on him and Kristian begin to date her but makes her promise to keep it a secret. Kirstian realises Lisa is still a virgin. He then dumps her which leads to Lisa seducing Cameron Clark (Ben Gerrard) and losing her virginity to him. She then gets back with Kristian but Lisa’s brother, Dan Hunter (Andrew McNair), finds out about the two dating and warns Kristian off.

Failing to keep any women, Kristian feels lonely and found the company of Jodie as the pair end up sleeping together. This soon ends when Jodie leaves Hollyoaks because she fails her course. Kristian begins to have one-night stands, one such night with Mel Burton (Cassie Powney) leaves her hurt by the way he treats her. He dates Stacey Foxx (Jemma Keys), which turns into a nightmare as she is on his case 24/7 with an annoying laugh. Desperate to get rid of her, he tells Stacey that he is gay and in a relationship with Nick. Kristian then transfers to another university.

== Reception ==
A reporter from Shropshire Star described Kristian as the show's "heartthrob student". Soaplife's Paul Brooks branded the character Hollyoaks' "new hunk".
