= Christina Baily =

English actress (b. 1981)

Christina Baily (born 19 June 1981) is an English actress.

Hailing from Stockport, Christina studied sports science and drama at Manchester Metropolitan University before enrolling at ArtsEd in London, where she received an M.A. Christina starred as the lead in the Award Winning play 'Looking for JJ' with Pilot Theatre Company. She has gone on to play numerous roles in theatre and television. She appeared as Dannii Carbone in the Channel 4 soap opera Hollyoaks in February 2004, and quit the show in 2006. She made a brief return in June 2007. In 2015, Baily fronted an advertisement for Oral B Pro-Expert toothpaste.

== Filmography ==
=== Movies ===
Desi Boyz (2011)

=== Television ===
Hollyoaks (2004–2007)
