= Elliot Bevan =

UK soap opera character, created 2007

- Hollyoaks character
- Portrayed by: Garnon Davies
- Duration: 2007–2010
- First appearance: 9 January 2007
- Last appearance: 15 November 2010
- Introduced by: Bryan Kirkwood
- Spin-off appearances: Hollyoaks Later (2008, 2010)
In-universe information
- Occupation: Student (2007–2009); Intern for NASA (2010–)
- Father: Gareth Bevan
- Mother: Bonnie Bevan
- Half-brothers: Maynard Bevan

Elliot Bevan is a fictional character from the British soap opera Hollyoaks, played by Garnon Davies. The character debuted on-screen during the episode broadcast on 9 January 2007. Elliot was introduced into the series as a new student character. In July 2010, it was announced that Davies had decided to leave the show. Elliot made his final appearance during the episode broadcast on 15 November 2010. Elliot's storylines included a relationship with his friend Sarah Barnes (Loui Batley) and finding his long-lost father.

== Casting ==
Elliot was created in 2006 and on the day auditions were held for Elliot, Davies attended another audition for a biscuit advertisement. Davies was unsure if he would receive the role because he presumed Hollyoaks were casting only attractive actors in roles. Davies told Josie Ensor from Western Mail that "the day I went for the audition I also had a casting for a McVitie's biscuits ad, I'm glad I got the one I did, but it was a weird audition. I remember thinking how many other boys there were on the day and how attractive they all were. I just thought they want good-looking guys like them, not me." Carley Stenson who plays Steph Cunningham in the show, praised Davies to producers, which he believed helped him to secure the role.

Elliot was originally intended to be a Scottish character. Davies included a Scottish accent on his CV when he auditioned for the role. When filming commenced, Davies was instructed to use his Welsh accent instead and the character was changed. Davies had to escalate his Welsh accent to impress producers, he explained to Ensor that "they also really liked the Welsh thing – they went mad for it. They thought it just added to his geeky character, I had to ham up my Welshness to fit in with the odd perception of Wales the producers had."

== Development ==
=== Characterisation ===
Elliot is introduced into the series as a new student studying at the Hollyoaks Community College. Davies praised the casting choices for the students. He described them as "five really different characters" with "some great storylines". Elliot is portrayed as a "loner", "geeky" and an "odd" character. Elliot was often portrayed in episodes wearing "geeky glasses" and a woolly hat. Davies had to spend time each morning getting into "geek mode" to play Elliot. A writer from the official Hollyoaks website described Elliot as a "science geek" who struggles to charm potential love interests. They often view Elliot as the "sweet friend" because of "his sweet, caring nature". They added that Elliot "usually sensible" but in some stories struggles to do what is considered "the right thing". Davies told a Josie Ensor (Western Mail) that he realised he was like Elliot. He explained "we are both terrible worriers and I realised we both like our own company, I love having lots of time to myself and Elliot is obviously a bit of a loner."

Davies believed that his fellow Welsh nationals have a "very strange stereotype" portrayed on television. Davies revealed that Hollyoaks writers played on this in Elliot's stories. He noted that when Steph pretended to be Elliot's girlfriend to fool his parents contained such stereotypes. Davies added that Steph was "making Welshcakes and wearing a garland of leeks and singing old Welsh songs."

Elliot's "odd" characteristics made him popular with viewers who empathised with him. Davies revealed that viewers "seem to really connect with Elliot." Davies revealed that he often received fan-mail praising Elliot. Davies began receiving gifts from a female viewer who was unable to separate the actor from his character. Davies revealed he had to report her to producers because she was convinced she was in a relationship with Elliot and they told her to cease further contact.

Hollyoaks often portray issue based storylines. Writers have used Elliot's persona to highlight the issues of bullying. Elliot is often seen being passively bullied by other characters and Elliot usually chooses not to confront the issue. In 2008, Hollyoaks producers chose Davies to join a campaign held by the Anti-Bullying Alliance, which was held during Anti-Bullying Week. A Hollyoaks publicist told a What's on TV reporter that "His character is a little bit different and he's always finding himself having to bite his tongue or get back at people. Rather than being bullied by a big group of people, it happens to him continuously. He represents one type of bullying, that's why he was chosen."

=== Breakdown and identity crisis ===
In April 2008, Davies revealed via a backstage video that his character would change his attitude and attire. Davies added that it would be featured in a new storyline for Elliot. He revealed that the character would ditch his usual geeky attire for a "funky" generic male look, complete with a new haircut styled with hair gel. Davies added that he was still filming scenes in Elliot's usual attire. He described "geeky Elliot" as having geeky jackets and shoes which resembled Cornish pasties. He added that "Elliot has had a bit of a make over because of something that happens to him and he is fed up of being a geek."

The story begins when Elliot begins to suffer mental health issues and has a breakdown. Elliot is transferred to a mental health clinic to have his condition treated. Producers introduced Elliot's mother, Bonnie Bevan (Melanie Walters) into the series in 2007, and she returns once again during Elliot's breakdown. He remains in an emotionally unstable state and Bonnie is forced to admit she lied about his father's disappearance. Bonnie told Elliot that his father was abducted by aliens when he was a child. In reality, his father abandoned Bonnie and Elliot. He was happy to continue believing the story into adulthood. Discovering his mother lied to him has a negative effect on Elliot and he discharges himself from hospital. A reporter from Inside Soap revealed that Elliot vows to change his persona and "smartens up his image and vowed to make those who wronged him pay."

=== Relationships ===
Writers portrayed Elliot as unlucky-in-love and constantly developing feelings for women who are incompatible with him. First Elliot develops romantic feelings for Jessica Harris (Jennifer Biddall) and later Steph. Writers chose to make them unrequited love stories. Davies told an Inside Soap reporter that "he keeps falling for these beautiful girls, but they don't want to know." In 2008, Writers continued to play on this and created a story in which Elliot falls in love with his friend, Sarah Barnes (Loui Batley). Initially, they continued Elliot's unlucky theme as Sarah fails to notice Elliot's feelings. Elliot becomes determined to start a relationship with her. When Sarah asks for Elliot's help to catch the culprit who injected Michaela McQueen (Hollie-Jay Bowes) with heroin, he uses the opportunity to impress her. Davies explained that Elliot's work pays off as Sarah agrees to join Elliot for a drink but they are interrupted.

Sarah plays the part of a professional model and in one episode, Sarah agrees to sponsor a pool tournament in the Student Union bar. The winner of the tournament receives a date with Sarah. Elliot learns about the prize date and Davies quipped that "he enters and wipes the floor with the other contestants." The date does not meet Elliot's romantic expectations because a reporter arrives to report on their date. Elliot is upset when he discovers Sarah knew about the reporter and it was just a publicity stunt for her modelling career. Davies stated it was originally another example of Elliot chasing women he cannot have. He believed that Elliot and Sarah were well suited because of their different personalities. He added they would "work well" because "he's quite grounding for her and she would bring out his rash side - if he has one, that is!" Writers continued Elliot's plight when they featured Sarah having an affair with Elliot's physics lecturer Roger Kiddle (Quentin Tibble). Sarah views Elliot as a friend and remains unaware that he is "besotted" with her. Sarah has sex with Roger in Elliot's bed and he discovers them together and heartbroken.

Producers decided to fully explore Elliot and Sarah's relationship later that year. A friendship between Elliot and Hannah Ashworth (Emma Rigby) was developed. She is Sarah's best friend and their bond causes Sarah to become jealous. Davies told Laura-Jayne Tyler from Inside Soap that "although Elliot's not aware of it, Sarah gets really jealous of his closeness to her mate - especially when he invites Hannah to attend a comics fair with them. I love the fact he turns into a real ladies man." Elliot is upset when Sarah does not attend the fair. When Elliot and Hannah bump heads, Sarah incorrectly assumes they have kissed. This furthers Sarah's jealousy and she decides to confess her feelings. Elliot and Zak Ramsey (Kent Riley) attend a ping-pong tournament at the Student Union bar. Davies revealed that his character is left in shock when Sarah interrupts the tournament to publicly tells everyone she is in love with Elliot. Davies was nervous about Elliot and Sarah's first kissing scenes. Davies is gay and Batley was his best friend from the Hollyoaks cast. Davies claimed that this made the filming experience "weird" but they eventually got used to portraying their character's romantic trysts.

Elliot and Sarah's relationship was unsuccessful because Elliot realises they are not compatible. Writers continued to use the storyline during Elliot's next relationship plot. In a surprise change, Elliot realises he was actually in love with Hannah. Their closeness enrages Sarah's jealousy further and she plots revenge against her friend. Elliot helps Hannah organise a Halloween ball and Sarah sabotages Hannah's dress. Elliot rushes to Hannah's aid and provides her with a Stormtrooper outfit. Rigby told an Inside Soap reporter that Hannah is "gobsmacked" that her best friend would turn on her over Elliot. She added "at this point, she isn't aware that Elliot likes her and Sarah is jealous. Hannah can't imagine that he'd look twice at her, having dated Sarah." Rigby believed that Hannah was better suited to Elliot than Sarah was. She reasoned that Sarah is "vain" whereas Hannah is "more geeky, like him. I think they make a sweet couple." Elliot eventually tells Hannah he loves her and they share their first kiss. Ribgy stated that Hannah is left "swooning" by Elliot's attentions. Together they win the fancy dress competition at the ball and grow closer, beginning a relationship. Their relationship is short because Hannah struggles to accept Elliot's fixation on building a robot.

=== Alien story ===
In June 2010, it was announced that Elliot would be featured in a unique alien themed storyline. The story was created by the show's executive producer Paul Marquess. It features a new character, Kevin Smith (Cameron Crighton) befriending Elliot and claiming to be an alien. He tries to convince Elliot he is from Aecyron Proxima Centauri, a red dwarf star in the constellation of Centauri. The storyline was controversial because of its timing and themes. When the story was created, Marquess had been tasked with rejuvenating the show following a period of low ratings. Days prior to the announcement, the show logged its lowest ever ratings. Marquess was certain the storyline would be successful though cast members questioned his choices.

The story also caused trouble in the show's cast. An anonymous cast member leaked storyline details to British tabloids. They stated that "everyone knows Hollyoaks can get away with different storylines. But having an alien land in the village is just out of this world, the soap's bosses have to convince viewers that they're actually watching an alien walking around the village." They added that cast members "actually burst out laughing" when they discovered the storyline. They added that the storyline had been filmed and would definitely be screened. Actress Hollie-Jay Bowes who plays Michaela in the show, later confirmed plot details of the alien storyline via social networking website Twitter. Her actions annoyed producers and played a role in her being written out of Hollyoaks.

=== Departure ===
In July 2010, it was announced Davies had decided to leave Hollyoaks and Elliot would be written out later that year. Davies' departure was confirmed with the departures of Glen Wallace (Malachy Fisher) and John Pickard (Dom Reilly). Of his decision to leave, Davies told Kris Green from Digital Spy that it was "very strange" to leave after four years in the role. He added that he "loved" his time on the show and branded it a "great experience". Davies jested that he would not miss dressing up in Elliot's usual attire. He added "I'm not sure that I'll miss Elliot's geeky glasses and that damn woolly hat but I will miss Elliot — he's been a fantastic character to play and I will look back on this experience with very fond memories". A Channel 4 publicist told Green that it was "sad" to lose more cast members "but everyone acknowledges that actors want to move on to pursue other roles." They added that despite Elliot's departure storyline being undecided upon, it would definitely be a "memorable exit".

Elliot made his final appearance during the episode broadcast on 15 November 2010. Elliot's departure story featured him leaving Hollyoaks after securing a job at NASA. Davies released a statement about his departure, in which he stated "I think my character had done everything he was going to do on the show and as an actor it felt like a good time to move on. It's exciting to be back out there and auditioning for things again."

== Storylines ==
Elliot arrives in January 2007 as a radio caller who calls Kris Fisher (Gerard McCarthy) to tell him about his views on UFOs. Kris is sceptical, so Elliot meets with Kris and shows him recordings of alien sightings. Kris still refuses to believe him. However, Kris's flatmate Jessica publishes Elliot's theories in the college newspaper. Elliot develops feelings for Jessica and on numerous occasions tries to persuade her to go out with him. Elliot tries to stand up for Steph when she is taunted by Wayne Tunnicliffe (Joe Marsden) and Sonny Valentine (Devon Anderson). Steph tells Elliot she does not need help. When Wayne throws eggs at Elliot, Steph intervenes and helps him. After this, Elliot and Steph become friends, and Elliot takes her stargazing. Steph begins to assume Elliot has a crush on her, however he tells her he does not. Jess finds Elliot's diary in the village and publishes some of its content to the college newspaper. An angry and embarrassed Elliot attempts to buy all of the newspapers. With help from fellow student Zak, Elliot retrieves his diary from Jess. Elliot learns his mother Bonnie has arranged a marriage for him back in Wales to a girl named Rhiannon. Steph agrees to help Elliot, by pretending to be his girlfriend, so he does not need to get married. However, Bonnie appears in the village and tells Elliot she still expects him to marry Rhiannon. Elliot then stands up to his mother, who leaves the village.

Elliot becomes friends with John Paul McQueen (James Sutton) when they take over Kris's radio station after an argument. Elliot begins to feel that the radio broadcasts are the only time anyone ever listens to him, so they agree not to tell Kris that they were the ones who took over the station. After this, Elliot falls for close friend Sarah. During a date, Elliot is angered to discover it was a publicity stunt, due to Sarah's modelling career, and is upset when a reporter taunts him about his looks. Sarah, who does not acknowledge Elliot's feelings, begins an affair with Elliot's physics lecturer Roger. After Elliot discovers finds Sarah and Roger in bed together, he is angry, and refuses to speak to either of them. Still upset over Sarah, Elliot refuses to help Lauren Valentine (Dominique Jackson) and Barry "Newt" Newton (Nico Mirallegro) with their studies. Lauren and Newt decide to take revenge on Elliot by pretending to be Elliot's father, who Elliot believes was abducted by aliens. They lead Elliot out into the woods at night, where he believes his father is coming to meet him. Elliot begins calling for his father when he does not show. Elliot goes missing, only to turn up in hospital a few days later, suffering from hypothermia. Bonnie arrives to visit him and confesses that Elliot's father walked out on them when Elliot was a child, and was not abducted. Feeling betrayed, Elliot rids himself of all his astronomical belongings and changes his image. With this, he becomes a stronger person and stands up against Newt, Lauren, Sarah and Roger. Soon after, Elliot sees that he is not happy with his new style, so changes back and makes up with Sarah.

Weeks later, Elliot is convinced by Zak, among others, to tell Sarah how he feels about her, which he does. Initially Sarah is not interested. However, she eventually realises that she really does like Elliot and agrees to go out with him. After going on several dates, Sarah begins to put pressure on Elliot to have sex. Elliot then decides that they have little in common, so ends their relationship. Elliot then becomes close to Sarah's friend Hannah, and begins to have feelings for her. Hannah also develops feelings for Elliot, and they begin a relationship, much to Sarah's jealousy when she catches them in bed together. However, Elliot and Hannah's relationship is also short lived, as he seems more interested in spending time with her father Nev (Jim Millea), building model rockets.

Elliot's fellow student Leila Roy (Lena Kaur) shows an interest in him and they soon begin a relationship. Leila contacts Elliot's father Gareth (Phil Howe). Elliot is reluctant to talk to his father, and is angered with Leila for interfering. After agreeing to hear Gareth's reasons for leaving him and his mother, Elliot is shocked when Gareth tells him he has another son named Maynard, Elliot's half brother. Leila grows suspicious of Gareth and calls Bonnie, who reveals Gareth had an affair, this being the reason he left her and Elliot. Elliot tells Gareth to leave, and ends his relationship with Leila. Elliot, Kris, Zak and Archie Carpenter (Stephen Beard) move into a flat together, where they find £100,000 belonging to Warren Fox (Jamie Lomas). They all agree to split the money. However, Archie calls his friend Ged Paxton (Charlie Wade) to pretend to kidnap him, claiming to be an old acquaintance of Warren's looking for the money. Elliot, Kris and Zak agree to give Ged the money, unaware it is a stitch up. Ged, however, decides he wants all of the money, and threatens to throw Archie from a roof. When Kris, Zak and Elliot discover Archie's lies, Kris throws the money over the roof and it blows away in the wind. Elliot is further betrayed by Archie when he sleeps with Leila. Elliot, Kris, Zak and Zoe Carpenter (Zoe Lister) begin a job in a call centre, where they work for Sheila Buxton (Jessica Hall). Sheila takes a liking to Elliot and they eventually start a short-lived relationship, which is ended when Elliot realises he loves Leila. Leila, however, moves to Paris to become an artist.

Elliot befriends new student Kevin, who claims to be an alien from a different planet. Elliot agrees to help him build a beacon in order to summon his race. Elliot finds Kevin's birth certificate and discovers he was abandoned by his parents at birth. Kevin later goes missing and Elliot discovers a new planet in the Solar System. He receives a job offer from NASA. Texas Longford (Bianca Hendrickse-Spendlove) is sceptical of the e-mail and tells Elliot not to trust it. However, NASA send Elliot a plane ticket to America. Realising he may never see Kevin again, Elliot hangs up his beloved hat on the beacon and leaves for his new job.

== Reception ==
Daniel Kilkelly and Ryan Love from Digital Spy branded the character a "sci-fi fanatic" and a "sci-fi geek" respectively, and Dawn Collinson from Liverpool Echo added that he was an "alien-loving student". A Female First reporter called Elliot a "geeky Welsh student" and a "sci-fi enthusiast". They also assessed that the alien plot was an "unconventional story". James Leyfield from Yahoo! News branded Elliot an "innocent super-geek" type with a "trademark hat". He included the Kevin the Alien storyline in Yahoo's list of top ten most ridiculous storylines. Leyfield opined that the story was completely implausible but good aspects. He concluded "it wasn't all bad though as Elliot landed a job with NASA and left the village." Gary Ryan from NME branded the alien story and Elliot joining NASA as one of Hollyoaks' "most bonkers plotlines". Di Hollingsworth from What's on TV opined that Hannah "was fighting a losing battle" having a relationship with Elliot. She explained that all Elliot cared about was "building his precious robot". A writer for MSN criticised the show's quality upon Davies' departure. She opined "is it a case of rats deserting a sinking ship? Hollyoaks has been in a bit of rut for a while now... We shall see."

Western Mail's Sion Morgan claimed Davies was "best known for his portrayal of geeky Welsh student Elliot Bevan." Morgan's colleague Josie Ensor branded him a "geeked-up" character – complete with NHS specs." She believed Davies received "unusual and scary" fan-mail because of "Elliot's odd character". In a negative review, Claire Hill from the publication was critical of Elliot. She described him as a "nerdy student" who "revels in UFOs and maths" with a "traditional mother". Hill assessed that Hollyoaks portrayed "the old biases" about Welsh people via Elliot. She scathed that Elliot was "a boy whose fictional make-up harked back to the dark ages." Hill believed that Elliot's arranged marriage to fellow Welsh national Rhiannon was problematic and unoriginal. She added "the soap is the only one to feature a Welsh character and he is hardly breaking the stereotypes which have perpetuated about Wales for years." Dr Jamie Medhurst, a film and TV lecturer at Aberystwyth University criticised the arranged marriage storyline, adding "it sounds like a far-fetched storyline anyway." A writer from Holy Soap described Elliot's most memorable moment as being "getting to snog his long-held crushes Hannah and Sarah. A victory for geeks everywhere."
