= List of Scott & Bailey characters =

Scott & Bailey is an ITV crime drama. The series debuted on 29 May 2011, and stars Suranne Jones, Lesley Sharp, Amelia Bullmore, Danny Miller, Nicholas Gleaves, and Pippa Haywood.

The members of Syndicate 9 as featured in Scott & Bailey's fourth series: (front) Bailey, Waddington, Crowley, Readyough (back) Broadhurst, Scott, Mitchell, Murray.

== Main cast and characters ==
=== Overview ===
Actor	Character	Occupation	Seasons				
Actor	Character	Occupation	1	2	3	4	5
Suranne Jones	Rachel Bailey	DC / ADS / DS / ADI	Main	Main	Main	Main	Main
Lesley Sharp	Janet Scott	DC / ADS	Main	Main	Main	Main	Main
Amelia Bullmore	Gill Murray	DCI	Main	Main	Main	Main	
Nicholas Gleaves	Andy Roper	DS	Main	Main			
Danny Miller	Rob Waddington	DS			Main	Main	
Pippa Haywood	Julie Dodson	DCI / DSI		Also Starring	Also Starring	Also Starring	Main

=== Rachel Bailey ===
Rachel Bailey
- Scott & Bailey character
- First appearance: "Congratulations"
- Last appearance: "Change"
- Portrayed by: Suranne Jones

In-universe information
- Nickname: Sherlock
- Title(s): DC (series 1–3); Acting DS (series 4); DS (series 4); Acting DI (series 5)
- Occupation: Police Officer
- Affiliation: Manchester Metropolitan Police; Syndicate 9 (MIT); Non Specific Police Force (London); Vice Division

Rachel Bailey (Suranne Jones) is an Acting Detective Inspector (A/DI) and the ranking officer within the Syndicate 9 Major Incident Team. A career woman, Rachel was aged 32 during series two. Since joining the Manchester Metropolitan Police in 2001, Rachel has earned the nickname "Sherlock" for her deductive and investigative skills. She is also a naturally skilled tier 3 interviewer, adopting a less friendly, abrupt style to acquire information from suspects. It was these skills that led to Rachel joining MIT in 2010, and her subsequent swift promotion from Detective Constable during the show's fourth series. Her personal life, however, is fraught with self-destructive (even childish) behaviour and strained family relationships that tend to adversely affect her work. In Series 3 she marries former flame PC Sean McCartney, but soon realises it was a mistake and has a fling with various people including DC Kevin Lumb, which causes tension with Janet when the pair sleep together at Janet's house. After a rocky start, she quickly adapts in her new role as Sergeant with a retiring Gill telling her she was proud of her. During the fifth series, Rachel will return to Syndicate 9 following a Vice secondment in London. In this capacity, Rachel is promoted to Acting Detective Inspector.

=== Janet Scott ===
Janet Scott
- Scott & Bailey character
- First appearance: "Congratulations"
- Last appearance: "Change"
- Portrayed by: Lesley Sharp

In-universe information
- Title(s): DC (series 1–5); Acting DS (series 3)
- Occupation: Police Officer
- Affiliation: Greater Manchester Police; Syndicate 9 (MIT)

Janet Scott (Lesley Sharp) is Rachel Bailey's working partner and close friend. She is a quick-witted, friendly and long-standing member of the team. Janet was 46 at the start of the series and attended Bruche alongside Andy Roper in 1982. She is more logical than Bailey, and finds satisfaction in her job, refusing repeated offers for promotion. Lesley Sharp describes her as "a woman who is at the top of her game in a job but who has deliberately chosen to stay in what appears to be one of the lower ranks" instead of progressing to a more senior position. Her marriage to Adrian disintegrates as the series progresses, which leads to an impulsive affair with DS Andy Roper before she breaks it off. She was inspired to join the police after the unsolved murder of her childhood friend Veronica Hastings, which she finally solves near the end of series one. Throughout the series, Scott is shown to be unflappable and calm in her interviewing style- switching between soothing and stern approaches, she is trained in tier 3 interviewing techniques. In series three, Janet is promoted to Acting Detective Sergeant. In series four, she is once again given the opportunity for promotion, but declines. Janet joined MIT in 2009, after a career break. Also in series four, Janet begins dating DC Chris Crowley. They separate sometime prior to the start of the fifth series. In series five, Janet's daughter is arrested for possession and distribution of indecent images of children.

=== Gill Murray ===
Gill Murray
- Scott & Bailey character
- First appearance: "Congratulations"
- Last appearance: "Lost Loyalty"
- Portrayed by: Amelia Bullmore

In-universe information
- Nickname: Godzilla
- Title: DCI
- Occupation: Police Officer
- Affiliation: Greater Manchester Police; Syndicate 9 (MIT)

Gill Murray (Amelia Bullmore) is a Detective Chief Inspector, the head of MIT and a single mother to Sammy. Nicknamed "Godzilla" by Rachel, Gill is strict, abrupt and naturally sardonic, though she occasionally has a nicer side- this earns her unerring loyalty and respect of her syndicate. She has been close friends with Janet for over 20 years, and attended Bruche alongside Dave Murray and Mitch in 1984. In 2008, following her divorce from Dave, Gill is offered the opportunity to head Syndicate 9 MIT, which she runs with ruthless efficiency, pushing hard for results and refusing to accept failure. Her relationship with Rachel is largely work-based and at times strained by Rachel's impulsive, maverick nature. After being taken hostage and nearly killed in the Series 3 finale, as well as coming under pressure to retire, Gill becomes an alcoholic in Series 4, which leads a concerned Janet to report her to Dodson. She later retires with her reputation of integrity, honesty and efficiency intact. Gill is responsible for promoting Rachel to Detective Sergeant in series four. Gill is not replaced following her departure, and as such a series of temporary SIO's rotate through Syndicate 9 from other MIT departments. Rachel later takes this position on a semi-permanent basis, a transition she describes as "walking in a dead woman's shoes, while she's still watching".

=== Andy Roper ===
Andy Roper
- Scott & Bailey character
- First appearance: "Congratulations"
- Last appearance: "Divided Loyalties"
- Portrayed by: Nicholas Gleaves

In-universe information
- Title: DS
- Occupation: Police Officer
- Affiliation: Greater Manchester Police; Syndicate 9 (MIT); Syndicate 6 (MIT)

Andy Roper (Nicholas Gleaves) is a Detective Sergeant. He has been desperately in love with Janet since they attended Bruche together in 1982, though their relationship sours when she realises she does not reciprocate his rather intense feelings. After a shouting match in front of the team, Gill forces them into a room alone, where Andy admits that a previous marriage fell apart for similar reasons, causing him to have a nervous breakdown. Although they appear to resolve things, in the Series 2 finale he gives Janet misinformation that causes Gill to miss an appointment with the coroner, humiliating her. Since neither admits to causing the confusion, Gill tells the pair to decide which of them will leave the MIT. Later, Gill tells Andy he was overheard misspeaking and, believing he did so on purpose, forces him to transfer out. Andy leaves for Syndicate 6 with the others watching him pack his desk, he also exchanges looks with Janet and Mitch who he rightly guesses informed Gill. He also informs Janet's husband Ade of their affair resulting in their divorce as Janet deliberately pushed him to split with her during her affair with Andy.

=== Rob Waddington ===
Rob Waddington
- Scott & Bailey character
- First appearance: "Cradle"
- Last appearance: "Tough Love"
- Portrayed by: Danny Miller

In-universe information
- Title: DS
- Occupation: Police Officer
- Affiliation: Greater Manchester Police; Syndicate 9 (MIT)

Rob Waddington (Danny Miller) is a young, fast-tracked Detective Sergeant who was hired after Janet insisted she didn't want a promotion following Andy's departure. He is shown to be a decent officer, but lacks the confidence and leadership skills of Gill, causing the team to make fun of him at times. He also has a slightly flirtatious relationship with Janet, which Rachel exploits by sending him a sexually-suggestive e-mail using Janet's account; although she intends it as a joke, Rob is embarrassed enough to report it to Gill and Janet is infuriated. As part of his fast-track career progression, Rob leaves the MIT early in Series 4 for a sex crimes unit, leading to Rachel being promoted to DS. In his career, Rob was following in the footsteps of his father, whose competence is called into question when an old case is reopened during Rob's last week with MIT and leads Rob to clash with Rachel during the course of the investigation.

=== Julie Dodson ===
Julie Dodson
- Scott & Bailey character
- First appearance: "Loyalty"
- Last appearance: "Change"
- Portrayed by: Pippa Haywood

In-universe information
- Nickname: Slap
- Title: DSI
- Occupation: Police Officer
- Affiliation: Greater Manchester Police; Syndicate 3 (MIT); MIT Oversight

Julie Dodson (Pippa Haywood) is head of Syndicate 3 as a Detective Superintendent, and close friends with Gill Murray. Kevin used to work for her until he was moved to MIT, and he harbours a deep resentment towards her. Haywood joined the cast in the second series, notably when handling the inquiry into the murder of Nick Savage, and becomes more prominent in the latter half of Series 3 when asked to lead the Helen Bartlett case. Noting the character's close relationship with Gill, Haywood stated, "I like the double act between Julie and Gill Murray. When they are at work they have this reputation that they are fearsome; a force to be reckoned with, but there's also a lot of humour between them". Late in Series 4 Dodson is asked by Janet to investigate allegations that Gill is drunk on the job, putting a strain on their friendship when Gill's ability to lead the MIT is called into question. Following Gill's departure, Dodson assigns a series of temporary SIOs to Syndicate 9, staffed exclusively by Constables. She later promotes Rachel into the position of Detective Inspector. Dodson has a somewhat risk averse approach to investigations, most apparent in season 4 when Gill pushes for a massive taskforce investigation into the Pritchards while Dodson was less enthusiastic, opting for a more cautious, smaller target strategy. She is later apprehensive to Rachel's handling of the investigation as acting DI in season 5.

== Supporting cast and characters ==
=== Overview ===
Actor	Character	Occupation	Seasons				
Actor	Character	Occupation	1	2	3	4	5
David Prosho	Ian Mitchell	DC	Also Starring	Also Starring	Also Starring	Also Starring	Also Starring
Delroy Brown	Lee Broadhurst	DC	Also Starring	Also Starring	Also Starring	Also Starring	Also Starring
Tony Mooney	Pete Readyough	DC	Also Starring	Also Starring	Also Starring	Also Starring	Also Starring
Ben Batt	Kevin Lumb	DC	Also Starring	Also Starring	Also Starring		
Rupert Graves	Nick Savage	Barrister	Also Starring				
Sean Maguire	Sean McCartney	PC		Also Starring	Also Starring		
Danny Webb	Chris Crowley	DC				Also Starring	
Steve Toussaint	Will Pemberton	DSI				Also Starring	
Jing Lusi	Anna Ram	DC					Also Starring

=== Nick Savage ===
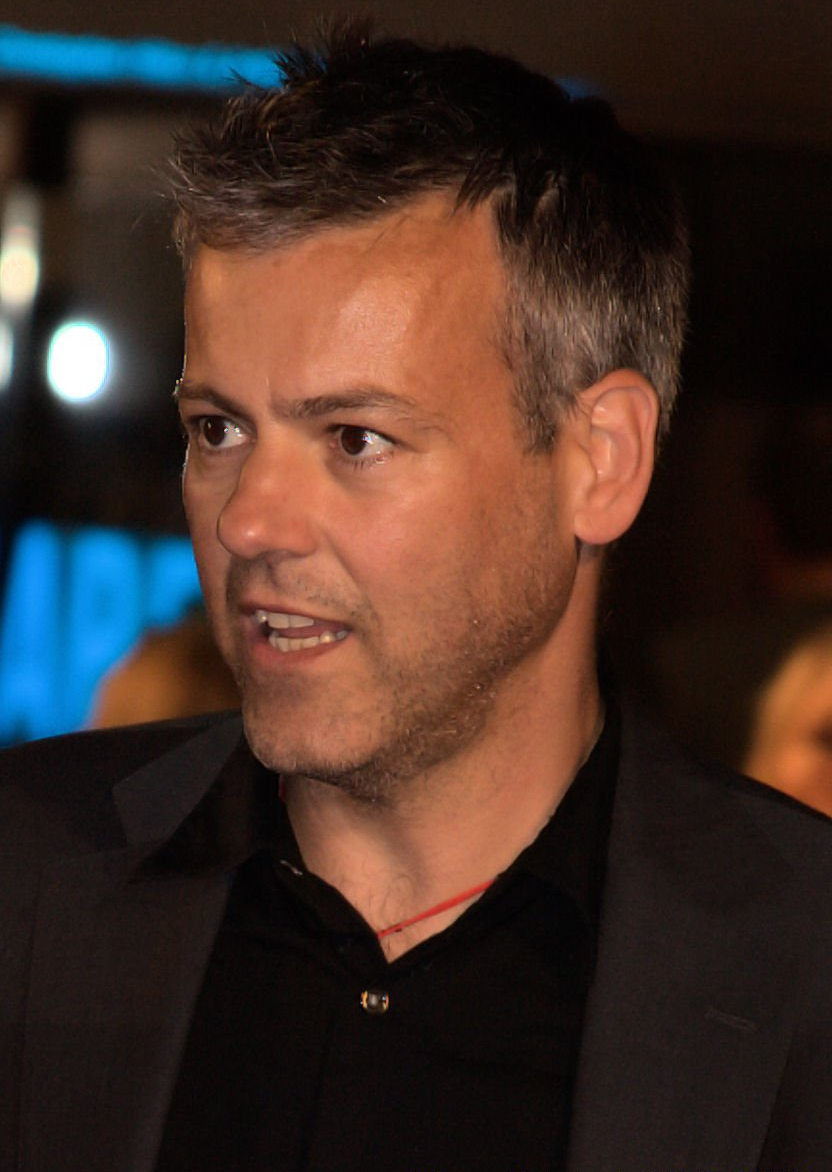
Rupert Graves played barrister Nick Savage in the first series

Nicholas "Nick" Savage (Rupert Graves) was a wealthy barrister and Rachel's ex-lover. After he abruptly breaks up with her in the first episode, she abuses her police resources to track him down, discovering he was in fact married with two sons. He had an apartment in the city centre, which Rachel blackmailed him into letting her move into by threatening to inform his wife Caroline (Louise Delamere) of their affair. Rachel finds out she is pregnant with Nick's baby and plans to have an abortion, though she ultimately decides against it. However, she later miscarries, which Nick takes advantage of to reclaim the apartment after Caroline learns of his infidelity anyway and kicks him out. Rachel soon discovers that Nick had an affair with a female juror whilst defending a client and business associate, which if made public would destroy his career. When Nick hears of this, he gets back together with Rachel and (at her pressuring) proposes marriage, until Janet convinces Rachel he is only doing so to keep her from turning him in. In the Series 1 finale Rachel narrowly avoids being killed by a hit-and-run driver; she eventually learns this was done at the behest of Savage, who is arrested and charged with attempted murder.

Savage does not appear in Series 2, but is mentioned throughout. In the third episode Gill discovers that the attempted murder charge has been dropped. He is later released without charge; upon learning of this, Rachel goes on a bender with Janet and lets out months worth of anger and misery over the fact that he essentially got away with ruining her life. In the Series 2 finale Savage is attacked and brutally beaten, later dying in hospital. Dominic, Rachel's brother, is revealed to be the attacker, claiming he was driven to it after hearing his sister's anguish; she chases him down and berates him, but ultimately chooses to let him run. In Series 3 he is caught and sent to prison after an investigation proves that Rachel had nothing to do with the attack.

=== Kevin Lumb ===
Detective Constable Kevin Lumb (Ben Batt) was the joker of the team. Of the Detective Constables in MIT, he was the most overtly condescending and sexist, and yet he became upset and defensive when mocked for his arrogance and general incompetence. After failing his Sergeant's exam early in Series 3, he was told by Gill dismissively that are other things besides promotion, he is often on the receiving end of her anger and reprimands. Rachel, whose life he once saved whilst arresting a violent suspect, impulsively has sex with him during her marriage to Sean McCartney. At the time Rachel is hiding from Sean at Janet's; she brings Kevin there and they are soon discovered. Janet's outrage and Rachel's unapologetic attitude leads to a short but deep rift in their friendship. Rachel soon admits of the affair to Sean, who corners Kevin - the best man at the wedding - and punches him in the face before the rest of the office, exposing the relationship to all their colleagues. In the same episode, the unit is informed by Gill that Kevin has been arrested and suspended for leaking information on a big murder case to the press (though earlier series imply this is not the first time he has done so). Gill orders the rest of the team not to contact him any further, despite this Rachel goes to the pub where Kevin is sitting alone facing ruin of career and possible criminal charges, which will lead him to lose his job. She asks him why he committed his actions he mentions his meeting with Gill in which he interpreted her words as telling him "that he didn't deserve to be in her unit" she wishes him the best and kisses him goodbye. Kevin doesn't appear again after this but Gill later mentions in Series 4 that Kevin is serving time in HM Prison Manchester, confirming that Kevin was convicted and jailed for his crimes.

=== Ian Mitchell ===
DC Ian Mitchell (David Prosho), known to his friends as Mitch, is a DC assigned to Syndicate 9. He often serves as support to Scott & Bailey, though on occasion he is called to make arrests. It is alluded but not stated till later that he verified that Andy intentionally gave Gill bad information causing her to miss an appointment. Andy is transferred out as a result, Janet expresses gratitude Mitch mentions that he caught a lot of flack for doing so. In series five, Ian loses his day-planner and inadvertently leaks information about a murder case to the press, infuriating Rachel, who is acting head of MIT at the time. To "prove [to Rachel that] he wasn't useless," Mitch enters a house on his own to confront an ex-Army officer suffering from PTSD, who stabs him in the throat; Mitch dies soon after.

=== Pete Readyough ===
DC Pete Readyough (Tony Mooney) is a Detective assigned to Syndicate 9. Pete becomes more prominent during Series 3, as his personal and professional lives suffer after he drunkenly has sex with Rachel's mother at a wedding reception. Gill cathes them and admonishes him for doing it in public. His wife throws him out of their house, his son punches him as well and the team, with the exception of Janet, shows little sympathy. Throughout series five, when Rachel is promoted to a sacting DI he tends to openly challenge her authority. Which happens more after Mitch is murdered, devastating him as Rachel blamed Mitch for jeopordising a major case when he lost his day planner.

=== Lee Broadhurst ===
DC Lee Broadhurst (Delroy Brown) is a Detective assigned to Syndicate 9.

=== Chris Crowley ===
DC Chris Crowley (Danny Webb) is assigned to Syndicate 9 in Series 4. He finds himself often partnered with and soon becomes close to Janet. The two engage in a short term relationship, though they later separate because "nice" became "boring". Crowley transferred to a different department shortly thereafter, before the events of Series 5.

=== Anna Ram ===
DC Anna Ram (Jing Lusi) is a Detective assigned to Syndicate 9. She was hired in Rachel's absence, and as such the two share an unspoken hostility during the fifth series. She is seen to be having a committed relationship with a woman, and doesn't drink alcohol.

=== Sean McCartney ===
PC Sean McCartney (Sean Maguire) first appears in Series 2 as an old flame of Rachel's. Over the course of an investigation they reconnect and become an item (to the chagrin of Kevin). Sean is any easygoing guy who never seems to get worked up about anything; though his persistent attempts to woo Rachel irritate her, he is supportive and always there to help when she needs it. Eventually he proposes marriage, going so far as to set a date and make the arrangements without telling her first. A reluctant Rachel agrees to the engagement in the Series 2 finale, after Sean turns up evidence exonerating her in a murder inquiry. Their wedding is shown in flashbacks in the second episode of Series 3. Rachel soon realizes the marriage was a mistake, as she never really wanted it, and after a one-night-stand with a stranger she has sex with Kevin Lumb (their best man). In the penultimate episode of Series 3 Rachel admits the affair to Sean, who attacks Kevin in the middle of the office, humiliating all three of them, before getting a divorce.

=== Will Pemberton ===
DSI Will Pemberton (Steve Toussaint) appears in Series 4 as the head of the Vice team. He enters into a relationship with Rachel, and secures her a Vice secondment in London. The two later separate. In the series finale Rachel is revealed to be pregnant, presumably making him the father but this is never confirmed.

== Recurring cast and characters ==
=== Overview ===
Actor	Character	Role	Seasons				
Actor	Character	Role	1	2	3	4	5
Sally Lindsay	Alison Bailey	Rachel's sister	Recurring	Recurring	Recurring	Recurring	Recurring
Harriet Waters	Taise Scott	Janet's daughter	Recurring	Recurring	Recurring	Recurring	Recurring
Sharon Flynn / Olivia Smith	Elise Scott	Janet's daughter	Recurring	Recurring	Recurring	Recurring	
Tony Pitts	Adrian Scott	Janet's husband	Recurring	Recurring	Recurring		
Vincent Regan	Dave Murray	DCS / Gill's ex-husband	Recurring	Recurring			
Kevin Doyle	Geoff Hastings	Janet's friend / suspect	Recurring	Recurring			
Julia Deakin / Judy Holt	Mary Jackson	Pathologist		Recurring	Recurring	Recurring	Recurring
Judith Barker	Dorothy Parsons	Janet's mother		Recurring	Recurring	Recurring	Recurring
Liam Boyle	Dominic Bailey	Rachel's brother		Recurring			
Tracie Bennett	Sharon Bailey	Rachel's mother			Recurring	Recurring	
Nicola Walker	Helen Bartlett	Suspect / witness			Recurring		
Gregg Chillin	Neil Simpson	SCAS Detective					Recurring

=== Alison Bailey ===
Alison Bailey (Sally Lindsay) is Rachel's older sister and is married with children. When their mother walked out, Alison essentially became the mother of the Bailey household, which she feels cost her the chance to do something with her life. As a result, she harbours a deep resentment towards their mother. Alison's relationship with Rachel and Dominic is strained at times because of her maternal instincts and occasional self-righteous behaviour but she tries very hard to support them. She moves into Rachel's house after having a falling out with her partner with her two kids. Sally Lindsay, who alongside Suranne Jones created the original idea for Scott & Bailey, has appeared in every series.

=== Dave Murray ===
DCS (Detective Chief Superintendent) Dave Murray (Vincent Regan), Gill's ex-husband, is well-known for his philandering ways and irresponsible attitude toward his work. He is father of her son, Sammy (Jake Roach) but left Gill when he got a 23-year-old uniform officer pregnant. In the first series Dave is acting Head of the Review Team while the head is away on maternity leave, causing friction between him and Gill. In Series 1 he appears to be deeply jealous when Gill enters into a new relationship, which manifests itself in petty office sniping. During Series 2, in which his personal life collapses (to the delight of MIT), he barges into Gill's house and launches into a drunken speech that culminates in him tearfully asking her if she still has feelings for him; a visibly upset Gill nevertheless refuses to even consider giving him a second chance.

=== Mary Jackson ===
Mary Jackson (Julia Deakin in Series 2 and Judy Holt thereafter), or "Scary Mary" as she is nicknamed by the department, is one of the pathologists who carries out post-mortem examinations in the mortuary. Her morbid sense of humour plays well off Gill Murray's more blunt attitude, especially since Gill has a habit of personally attending crime scenes and port mortems.

=== Dominic Bailey ===
Dominic Bailey (Liam Boyle), Rachel's younger brother, is introduced in Series 2. He had previously served a prison sentence for armed robbery. With nowhere to go after Alison throws him out, he ends up living with Rachel, who encourages him to look for work. At one point she walks in on him selling sex to a man in her home; outraged, she tells him to get tested for HIV, which comes back negative. Dominic's stay with Rachel is marked by his irresponsibility and tendency to get in trouble; he nearly destroys her kitchen attempting to cook her a meal and crashes her car during a joyride, which forces her to miss her sergeant's exam. It is also suggested a few times that he had a drinking problem, and later on Alison and Rachel discuss the possibility that he is mentally slow. Despite her exasperation, Rachel continues to stand by him.

In series 3 he is charged with murder and goes back to prison, though not before he alleges that Rachel provoked him to commit the crime, which leads to her brief (re)arrest. Domonic is denied permission by the Prison service to attend his mothers funeral. It is mentioned that he is coping in prison and has a partner.

=== Sharon Bailey ===
Sharon Bailey (Tracie Bennett), Rachel's mother, appears in the third series after being mentioned several times in Series 1 and 2. She is a boisterous, impulsive alcoholic who abandoned her children and is loathed by Alison, though Rachel tries to forgive her. Sean McCartney discovers that she was the one who sent bouquets of flowers to Rachel throughout the first two series. She drunkenly has sex with DC Pete Readyough in a car park at Rachel and Sean's wedding reception, but they are caught by Gill. Sharon uses this to extort money from Pete until he decides to admit it to his wife. His professional reputation is tarnished (along with a brief decline in his competency), and his marriage collapses. In Series 4 Sharon appeals to Rachel for help when her latest boyfriend becomes violent with her. She dies off screen with Alison and Rachel attending her funeral, Domonic is denied permission by the Prison service to attend.

=== Adrian Scott ===
Adrian "Ade" Scott (Tony Pitts), a geography teacher, was Janet's husband for twenty-five years. The pair have two teenage daughters, Taisie and Elise (Sharon Flynn in Series 1 and Olivia Rose Smith from Series 2 onward). Early in Series two Ade walks out to live with his elderly father following various petty arguments with Janet's mother. Janet, at first appealing to him to stay, loses her temper and says she is fed up with his lazy, self-entitled behavior. Unknown to Ade Janet deliberately moved her mother into their house, without his consent, to test his patience as she was having an affair with former boyfriend DS Andy Roper. Nevertheless, she continues to rely on him to help with their daughters and realizes just how much of their life he was responsible for maintaining. In the Series 2 finale Janet attempts a reconciliation, but this is ruined when Andy Roper, who was transferred to another division as he and Janet could not work together, spitefully reveals that his affair with Janet began long before their separation. He asserts that he will not leave the martial home they shared as he is not in the wrong. Early in Series three, Ade admits he is seeing someone and tells Janet he wants a divorce. Their daughter is revealed to have feelings for the son of Ade's new partner.

=== Taisie Scott ===
Taisie Scott (Harriet Waters) is Janet's younger daughter. She idolises Rachel and witnesses Rachel and Kevin having sex, which deeply angers her mother, causing a brief fracture in their friendship. She unintentionally reveals to Andy Roper that her mum and dad have split up, emboldening his advances for a further relationship with janet. In series five she is arrested for possession and distribution of child pornography after taking photographs of her boyfriend's penis. Janet appeals to the mother of the boy involved in an attempt to save her daughter, Janet relationship with Taisie is also strained as Janet can only stand by when her daughter is arrested. It is implied that the case may be dropped, but it is left ambiguous as the series ends.

=== Dorothy Parsons ===
Dorothy Parsons (Judith Barker) is Janet's mother. Dorothy moves in with the family for three months while recuperating from a big operation, and later buys Ade's share of the house at Janet's suggestion. She is shown to be incredibly fond of Gill, though she dislikes Rachel.

=== Geoff Hastings ===
Geoff Hastings (Kevin Doyle) is the brother of Janet's murdered childhood friend Veronica. He persuades Janet to review the cold case, which a retired detective has connected to the unsolved murders of four other women over the years. Janet's friendship with Geoff causes tension with Andy Roper, who sees a romantic rival and behaves coldly toward him. When MIT investigates a new murder with the same MO, Rachel and Janet come to realize that Geoff is a serial killer, and Veronica was his first, albeit unintended, victim. He stabs and nearly kills Janet while fleeing her home but is later arrested. He pleads guilty to the murders and is sentenced to prison. In the fifth episode of Series 2 Geoff claims to have information regarding fifteen other murders he allegedly committed, but will only talk to Janet. Instead he plays mind games with her, in the process revealing her affair with Andy to Gill. He also states that he made detailed diaries regarding the murders, but refuses to reveal where they are. Rachel, while on a bender, inadvertently guesses that the journals are buried with Geoff's mother, whom he loathed (and is implied to be the motivation for his killing spree). When asked about this Geoff becomes furious, validating Rachel's theory.

=== Helen Bartlett ===
Helen Bartlett (Nicola Walker) appears throughout Series 3 as the daughter of Joe and Eunice Bevan, who molested and murdered young boys for years, burying the bodies in their cellar. In the season premiere Helen becomes a suspect in Eunice's brutal murder, before Joe is found to be the killer. Helen later admits that Joe also killed her brother and forced her to bury the body, but this only results in Helen's arrest for denying lawful burial. Further investigation unearths the bodies of one of Helen's sisters under the floorboards of her parents' bedroom. A statement from the only surviving victim alleges that Helen was a willing participant in the rape, torture, and murder of the boys in the cellar; though this is proven to be untrue, it leads to a harassment campaign against Helen and her partner Louise by both public and press. In the series finale, a drunk and angry Helen takes Gill hostage, but ends up slitting her own wrists and bleeding to death. In Walker's first appearance, in episode one of the third series she looked "immaculate" working on a make-up counter in a department store, however, the veneer fades as her childhood trauma becomes apparent.

=== Neil Simpson ===
Neil Simpson (Gregg Chillin) is a SCAS Detective who appears in the fifth series. He is instrumental in the closing of Rachel's first case as a DI, and the two appear to be friends.
