= Alex Harrison =

Alex Harrison may refer to:

- Cy Harrison (born 1949), Scottish boxer
- List of Hollyoaks characters introduced in 2005#Other characters, a fictional Hollyoaks character
