= David Prosho =

English actor (born 1965)

Dave Prosho
- Born: 17 February 1965 (age 61); Leicestershire, England, U.K.

Dave Prosho (born 1965, Leicestershire) is an English actor. He studied drama at University of Winchester (then known as King Alfred's College) on the Drama, Theatre and Television Studies course, from 1983 to 1986.

Prosho is best known for his role as DC Ian Mitchell in Scott & Bailey. He has also appeared as Jimmy in The Syndicate, and in a number of other dramas, including Queer as Folk, Phoenix Nights, The Cops, The Second Coming, and The Vice.

He has also appeared in three Peter Kosminsky dramas: Walking on the Moon, Britz, and the BAFTA-winning The Government Inspector. Prosho has balanced his acting career with a career in education, between acting jobs, and is currently headteacher at Beechcliffe Special School in Thackley, Bradford.

== Filmography ==
| Year | Title | Role | Notes |
|---|---|---|---|
| 2020 | The North Water | William Harper | Miniseries, 1 episode |
| 2020 | The First Team | Bookmaker Terry | Episode: "Octopus Situation" |
| 2019 | Doctors | Dominic Smith | Episode: "End Game" |
| 2017 | Inspector George Gently | Donnelly | Episode: "Gently and the New Age" |
| 2017 | In the Dark | DCI / DI Ted Carter | Miniseries, 2 episodes |
| 2016 | To Walk Invisible: The Brontë Sisters | Bailiff | TV film |
| 2012 | The Syndicate | Jimmy | 2 episodes |
| 2012 | Secret State | MI6 Officer | Miniseries, 2 episodes |
| 2011–2016 | Scott & Bailey | DC Ian 'Mitch' Mitchell | Regular role, 31 episodes |
| 2009 | Unforgiven | DC Summergate | Miniseries, 1 episode |
| 2008 | Spooks: Code 9 | Philip | 1 episode |
| 2008 | True Heroes | | Episode: "Death Descent" |
| 2007 | New Street Law | DI Hunter | 1 episode |
| 2007 | Britz | Senior Police Officer | TV film |
| 2005 | The Government Inspector | Steve Haws | TV film |
| 2005 | Faith | Sgt. Green | TV film |
| 2004–2006 | Hollyoaks | Rob Owen | Regular role |
| 2003 | Casualty | Fire Chief | Episode: "Three in a Bed" |
| 2003 | The Second Coming | PC Jackson | Miniseries, 1 episode |
| 2003 | Burn It | Kevin Beswick | 1 episode |
| 2003 | Where the Heart It | Mick | Episode: "Not Waving But Drowning" |
| 2002 | Fat Friends | Simon Becker | Episode: "Sweet and Sour" |
| 2002 | Phoenix Nights | Chief Fireman | Episode: "Brian Gets Everyone Back Together" |
| 2002 | Always and Everyone | Nick Messiter | Episode: "Warrior's Heart" |
| 2001 | Doctors | Kevin Ross | Episode: "Twenty Years On" |
| 2001 | Casualty | Dave | Episode: "Holding the Baby" |
| 2000 | Close and True | DI Moran | Miniseries, episode: "Miss Newcastle" |
| 2000 | Coronation Street | Josh Cunningham | 2 episodes |
| 2000 | Blind Ambition | Mike Waite | TV film |
| 2000 | The Vice | Immigration Officer | 2 episodes: "Betrayed: Parts 1 & 2" |
| 2000 | Clocking Off | First Policeman | Episode: "Steve's Story" |
| 2000 | This Is Personal: The Hunt for the Yorkshire Ripper | Det. Sgt. Parks | Miniseries, 2 episodes |
| 1999–2001 | The Cops | Duty Sergeant | Regular role, 16 episodes |
| 1999 | CI5: The New Professionals | Cathcart | Episode: "Miss Hit" |
| 1999 | Walking on the Moon | Mr. Holmes | TV film |
| 1999 | Queer as Folk | Muscle Man | 1 episode |
| 1998 | Dalziel and Pascoe | Jimmy Howard | Episode: "The Wood Beyond" |
| 1998 | Heartbeat | Baldwin | Episode: "Hello, Goodbye" |
| 1998 | City Central | Jim | Episode: "Picking Up the Pieces" |
| 1998 | The Grand | Police Sergeant | 1 episode |
| 1997 | Peak Practice | Chris Ackroyd | Episode: "Fight or Flight" |
| 1997 | Police 2020 | Dr. Fortnum | TV film (pilot) |
| 1997 | Knight School | Prison Guard | Episode: "The New Boy" |
| 1996 | The Ward | Pete Jones | 2 episodes |
| 1996 | Out of the Blue | Danny Caswell | 1 episode |
| 1995–1998 | Emmerdale | Police Constable | 3 episodes |
