= Debbie Dean (Hollyoaks) =

UK soap opera character, created 2002

- Hollyoaks character
- Portrayed by: Jodi Albert
- Duration: 2002–2006
- First appearance: 31 October 2002
- Last appearance: 13 November 2006
- Introduced by: Jo Hallows (2002); Bryan Kirkwood (2006)
- Book appearances: Hollyoaks: Fame Game
In-universe information
- Occupation: Laundry worker
- Family: Dean
- Father: Johnno Dean
- Mother: Frankie Osborne
- Stepfather: Jack Osborne (2005–17)
- Stepmother: Michelle Dean (2005–17)
- Brothers: Jake Dean; Craig Dean
- Sisters: Steph Dean
- Half-brothers: Presley Dean; Brian Bloom

Debra "Debbie" Dean is a fictional character from the British Channel 4 soap opera Hollyoaks, played by Jodi Albert. She first appeared in 2002, before Albert quit the role in 2004. She made her final appearance during 2005, before making a brief return in 2006.

== Casting ==
Albert began filming for the role in September 2002. In October 2004 Albert decided not to renew her contract, she expressed that she wanted to leave to further her acting career. In September 2006 it was announced that Albert would make a brief return to the show in November 2006.

== Development ==
A writer from the show's official website described Debbie stating "Lively but often dishonest. Likes to poke fun at those she thinks are stuffy and uptight, but remains essentially loyal and kind-hearted." Debbie takes a job as a laundry worker in the local laundrette, Washed Up. Albert told an All About Soap reporter that playing a character "too nice" would be "boring". She liked playing Debbie because "a very strong edge" which made the role "more exciting". She added that Debbie's stories "can go a number of ways" because she "has so many levels to her".

Writers created a romance between Debbie and Dan Hunter (Andy McNair). Debbie is Dan's first serious love interest and McNair explained Dan is still adjusting to their romance. He stated that they have a "stormy" relationship because both characters are "very set in their ways and they are in turn quite different."

Debbie and Dan are portrayed as close friends, lovers and support each other through various dramas. Albert told Dorothy Koomson from All About Soap that Debbie likes Dan's "real bloke" and "whole rugged, manly look" image. Debbie enjoyed the challenge the "very serious and pretty moody" Dan provided, where she had to "crack his hard shell" to find "soft spots". Albert believed that Debbie's "light-hearted approach to life" and Dan's moodiness formed a well balanced relationship dynamic. Debbie has a tendency to "overreact" in the relationship and Dan is portrayed as the one willing to sort of their problems. McNair noted that Debbie enjoys bossing Dan about and is the more dominant figure in the relationship, noting she "wraps Dan around her little finger". Albert added that Debbie and Dan having an "amazing" sex life because Debbie is "very daring" and does not "hold back". This allows her to take control of the relationship better. Dan and Debbie also have a strong friendship writers rooted in their scenes. Albert explained that examples were when Debbie confides in Dan about her family issue, in turn h is supportive and writers show that the duo rely on each other.

McNair told Koomson's colleague, Joanne Tebbutt from that Dan's attraction to Debbie was born from her giving him attention when other females in the series would not. He believed the two "came from similar backgrounds" with "strong family values" and are both living in "hectic households". Debbie's desire to be famous is an issue for Dan, who wants to remain focused on his business. McNair added that Dan wants Debbie to be happy but would struggle if her career is successful. Albert told Koomson that Dan is "insecure" about Debbie having fun, he "flies off the handle" and Debbie becomes "defensive".

In one storyline, Debbie reveals that Dan is a virgin over a web broadcast in the Fish Tank. He is embarrassed and has sex with Roxy Maguire (Harriet Green), who is subsequently murdered by the mystery serial killer the same evening. Dan becomes a prime suspect in the murder investigation. Debbie discovers the Dan and Roxy had sex, which Albert revealed left Debbie "shocked and absolutely devastated". She added that Debbie also forgives Dan because she provoked Dan's behaviour by humiliating him in the broadcast. Debbie chooses to defend Dan because despite his betrayal, she does not believe he killed Roxy. McNair believed that Dan was remorseful and apologetic about cheating on Debbie. They continue their relationship, but she still has trust issues.

Debbie finds Dan's arrest over the murder of Toby Mills (Henry Luxembourg) difficult. Albert told Rick Fulton from Daily Record that Debbie's story arc becomes "quite heavy". She added that Debbie would face "a lot of heartbreak" over Dan. She described a "very hard" couple of month which occur because "she's so in love with Dan and he's going through a lot." Dan is sent to prison and the pair break-up following Debbie having sex with Darren Osborne (Ashley Taylor Dawson).

Debbie had mistreated Darren by getting back with Dan but she later wants to begin a relationship with Darren. She attempts to reconcile with Darren but he is not receptive. Albert told an Inside Soap reporter that Debbie and Dan's relationship is "definitely over" and she now wants to be with Darren. She revealed that Debbie knows "she's treated Darren badly and she desperately wants to make it up to him, but he's having non of it. So she really thinks she's blown it." Darren's cousin, Natalie Osborne (Tiffany Mulheron) becomes annoyed with Debbie because she wants to be with Darren. She begins scheming to keep them apart and is "furious" when Darren agrees to resume his relationship with Debbie. Albert explained that Debbie is unaware "Natalie has her eye on Darren too" but Natalie makes it known and is "all over him like a rash, trying to make Debbie jealous." She noted that Debbie is "furious" and "sees red" with Natalie when she realises her plan. They have a food fight with tomato ketchup, which the actress branded a "full-scale ketchup fight". Darren intervenes and breaks-up the fight, but is also delighted. Albert added that she and Mulheron had "great fun" filming the fight scenes.

Upon Dan's release from prison, writers created a betrayal of their relationship. This occurs when Dan begins dating Debbie's sister, Steph Dean (Carley Stenson). McNair told Suzanne Ostler from Soaplife Dan is confused about his feelings, he does not love Steph but will not admit he still loves Debbie either. Debbie becomes jealous of their relationship but hurts her further by claiming he does not love her. McNair believed Dan did love Debbie still but his anger over Darren prevents him from an admission. Debbie responds by having sex with Dan's best friend Ben Davies (Marcus Patric) but Dan pretends that it does not bother him. McNair revealed that Dan is "gutted" just like Debbie hoped for. Dan realises he loves Debbie when they go go-karting. This the "turning point" in the story for Debbie and Dan. Though he cannot act on his feelings because "he's slept with her sister" and Debbie's mother, Frankie Dean (Helen Pearson) is not impressed with Dan's behaviour around her daughters." He added that their history together is also another factor preventing their reconciliation.

== Storylines ==
Debbie arrived in 2002 with her father Johnno (Mark Powley), mother Frankie, brothers Jake (Kevin Sacre) and Craig (Guy Burnet), and sister Steph (Carley Stenson). She instantly fell for the charms of hard man Dan. The second child and first daughter of the Dean Family, Debbie started dating Dan as she often tried to loosen him up. Debbie started to work for Tony at ‘Il Gnosh’, but her heart had always been set on becoming a singer. Debbie went on a reality show where she revealed that Dan lost his virginity to her. This left Dan angry, but eventually, he forgave her. However, there was shock for Debbie when Dan was arrested for being a suspect as the serial killer of Hollyoaks, and she was also shocked that he slept with victim Roxy. Both convinced that Dan was innocent, Debbie and her father Johnno (Colin Wells) stuck by him and supported him as he was released.

However, things took another turning point for Debbie when Dan was arrested for the murder of Toby Mills (Henry Luxemburg), who was the real killer and again became a suspect after Dan's sister Ellie Hunter (Sarah Baxendale) blamed him for the murder of her husband. This left Debbie devastated as she tried to come terms with Dan's arrest, while there was more bad news for Debbie as her family were struggling with debts and sister Steph had epilepsy, after almost becoming a victim of Toby. Johnno supported Debbie and the family through this as best he could, and in return Debbie showed her loyalty to both her family and Dan, but was devastated when Dan was sent down for 18 years after Ellie testified against him. Still, Debbie believed there was hope as she tried to change Ellie's mind but there was a blow for her, when Dan told her that their relationship was over. Confused and puzzled, Debbie turned to Darren and the pair slept together, but it only lasted a short while.

However, Debbie faced another shock when Ellie told the truth and Dan was released from prison. Dan wanted to be with Debbie, but after she confessed that she slept with Darren, Dan said that there would be no relationship between the pair. With help from Johnno, Debbie tried to put all of this behind her, however, things became even more complex when Dan started dating Debbie's sister Steph for a while, but that lasted a short time after Dan admitted that he was still in love with Debbie. However, Debbie promised Steph that she would not date Dan as it would break Steph's heart.

Soon, Debbie's dream became true when she got a job offer to sing on a cruise ship in November 2004. But after her parents Johnno and Frankie's marriage collapsed, and Johnno decided to leave Hollyoaks when the couple divorced shortly afterwards, Debbie was unsure of whether to go or not. With Frankie, Jake, and Dan supporting her, Debbie decided to take the job but there was another setback when Dan died during his rallycross racing accident. After Dan's death, Debbie collapsed in tears as she found an engagement ring Dan had been planning to give to her on Christmas Day. By New Year's Eve, Debbie had decided not to wallow in grief and misery but to see more of the world and enjoy her life to the fullest — or as much as she could without Dan by her side. Debbie stayed until the funeral and regretted that she and Dan never got together. After some convincing from Dan's best mate Ben, Debbie decided to take the job and start a fresh new life and to succeed with her dreams. Debbie briefly returned in 2005 for a double wedding in the family. She witnessed her mother Frankie marry Jack Osborne (James McKenna) and her brother Jake marry Becca Hayton (Ali Bastian). She also returned in 2006 to re-open The Dog after Sam Owen (Louis Tamone) blew it up. She also had a job in the West End but lost her job when Steph became famous for her kiss and tell with Joe Jones.

== Reception ==
Daily Record's Rick Fulton assessed that Albert "quickly become one of [Hollyoaks'] star attractions". Albert was later voted FHM's "Sexiest Soap star of 2003". A writer from Virgin Media profiled some of Hollyoaks' "hottest females" in their opinion, of Debbie they stated: "The sassy Debbie Dean did her bit for Hollyoaks' male viewing ratings as she regularly tottered round in the skimpiest of outfits. She left, heartbroken after Dan's death, to sing on a cruise ship – lucky sailors!" Viewers liked the relationship between Debbie and Dan. In a poll ran by Inside Soap to determine whether Dan should forgive Debbie and continue their relationship. Sixty five per cent of readers voted that Dan should reconcile with Debbie. All About Soap's Tebbutt and Koomson assessed that Dan and Debbie "make a good couple" and there was "potential for them to be one of soap's great couples."
