= Jessica Harris (Hollyoaks) =

UK soap opera character, created 2005

- Hollyoaks character
- Portrayed by: Jennifer Biddall
- Duration: 2005–2007
- First appearance: 3 October 2005
- Last appearance: 31 December 2007
- Introduced by: David Hanson
In-universe information
- Father: Clive Harris

Jessica Harris is a fictional character from the British soap opera Hollyoaks, played by Jennifer Biddall. The character made her first appearance on 3 October 2005. Jessica's notable storylines include having meningitis, developing a gambling problem, a carbon monoxide leak plot. Her early relationship storylines explored a love-triangle with Gilly Roach (Anthony Quinlan) and Mark Jury (Ash Newman). In October 2007, it was announced that Biddall had chosen to leave the soap and Jessica made her final appearance during the episode broadcast on 31 December 2007. Biddall has since revealed she would not consider a permanent return to the role.

== Casting ==
In 2005, Jessica was created by executive producer David Hanson and actress Jennifer Biddall was cast into the role. Biddall made her first appearance as Jessica during the episode broadcast on 3 October 2005.

== Development ==
"Confident and headstrong, Jessica likes to be noticed. Seemingly able to succeed at everything she turns her hand to, Jessica has always made sure she gets what she wants - including her boyfriend Mark who she met when she was 15."

— Hollyoaks.com on Jessica

During an interview with the BBC, Biddall described Jessica stating, "she's a new university student studying Marketing and Advertising. She's confident, outgoing, she wants to be the life and soul and she's had a long term boyfriend since she was 15. She's part of the perfect couple and she's hoping to stay with him, so we'll see how that one pans out." Jessica only sees status as an attractive quality in males, commenting on this Biddall adds: "My character tends to go for the ones who have a bit of a status. So I think she quite likes Lee, who's the student president, there's a bit of an interest there. But she might have a few surprises up her sleeve and she might not necessarily go for the guy you'd expect her to."

BBC America describe her as "The spoiled little rich girl always has Daddy on the line if she breaks a nail." They also say it isn't wise to "call her a snob" because she "just used to the finer things in life." They also state that "she's not beyond working for her keep, or fraternizing with the plebes. Quite the contrary, she quite fancies people who are different from her. For instance, she's had a romance with the quite-offbeat, usually penniless Gilly Roach. However, she does have a boyfriend from home named Mark." A writer from E4.com described her as having an extremely turbulent love life.

Writers developed Jessica's first prominent relationship storyline with Gilly Roach (Anthony Quinlan). They soon introduced Jessica's ex-boyfriend Mark Jury (Ash Newman), who arrives to enrol at the Hollyoaks Community College, where Jessica also studies. He is unaware that Jessica has recently ended their relationship via a letter. Mark reasons that being fellow students will bring them closer together and they resume their romance. An Inside Soap reporter revealed that Gilly is "furious" about Mark's arrival and pretends to be okay with their relationship. When Gilly witnesses Mark's childish behaviour, he changes his mind and wants to be with Jessica.

Mark discovers that Jessica has been having a relationship with someone else in his absence. He believes that Rhys Ashworth (Andrew Moss) is the culprit and punches him in the face. Rhys is Gilly's best friend, but he opts to not reveal the truth. Olivia Johnson (Rochelle Gadd) defends Rhys and convinces Mark that he is innocent. Quinlan told an Inside Soap reporter that Mark views Gilly as a "no-hoper, so doesn't consider him to be a threat, and he's the last person Mark thinks Jessica would be interested in." He added that Mark is more shocked that Jessica would cheat on him. Quinlan explained that Gilly is a "coward" because he does not confess after becoming scared of Mark, who reveals he is former boxing champion. Writers also introduced an illness story for Jessica, which further complicated their dramas. Jessica is taken into hospital but Mark remains more concerned about finding her mystery lover. Quinlan believed that Gilly was better suited to Jessica because he prioritises her needs more than Mark does. He added "Jessica is really poorly right now, and Mark's definitely got his priorities wrong - he should be taking care of her instead of looking for revenge. Gilly's a nice guy, and would never do anything to hurt Jessica. And he can see where Mark's going wrong with her, which gives him an advantage." He concluded that it was inevitable that Gilly and Jessica would have to tell the truth. Jessica is diagnosed with meningitis and is hospitalised while she recovers. Jessica had planned to break-up with Mark before her illness. Mark informs Jessica that he still wants be with her and will disregard her earlier break-up letter. Gilly arrives at the hospital to tell Jessica he is in love with her but Mark intervenes. They begin arguing and fighting over her hospital bed, resulting in Jessica having them both removed from her room.

In September 2007, Jessica was involved in a high-profile storyline in which she held a house party in which she has a boiler illegally fixed. It resulted in a carbon monoxide leak, which it was then revealed had helped save a viewers life who was going through exactly the same ordeal at the time of viewing. The viewer stated, "The only respite I had in the middle of all my pain was Hollyoaks. I can’t believe I owe my life to it."

In October 2007, it was announced that Biddall had decided to leave the role in order to pursue other acting projects. Executive producer Bryan Kirkwood stated that "Biddall is in the pipeline to be leaving at the end of the year. She steps rather too readily into Zoe's shoes when Darren starts on his winning streak and they form a Bonnie and Clyde partnership which is very funny but she leaves in a dramatic twist in the New Year episode." Biddall later stated she would not consider a permanent return to Hollyoaks.

== Storylines ==
When Jessica arrives she will not part from her mobile phone linking with her ex-boyfriend Mark but they become estranged. When Mark arrives at the college Jessica retrieves a letter she sent him breaking up with him in favour of romancing Gilly. They remain together until the letter is found revealing the truth. Mark and Gilly battle for her affections while she is in hospital with meningitis but she struggles to decide between them, so she tries to date both of them. She later breaks-up with both Mark and Gilly because she feels she is being unfair to them. She and Olivia protest about being unfairly fired from the restaurant, Il Gnosh, and stage a nude protest.

Jessica is upset when Olivia dies in a fire at The Dog in the Pond pub. Her new flatmate Kris Fisher (Gerard McCarthy), who had convinced Olivia to stand up for herself, taunts and insults Jessica and accuses her of not being a good friend to Olivia. Kris also reads Olivia's diary which contains negative opinions Olivia had about Jessica. She competes with Will Hackett (Oliver Farnworth) for the position of Editor of HCC's newspaper. She gains the position by using Russ Owen's (Stuart Manning) social anthropology research on the class differences between the Owen and McQueen families as her article. Jessica endures a difficult relationship with Kris. To make Jessica jealous, he kisses a man and she responds by kissing Elliot Bevan (Garnon Davies). Jessica and Kris get locked in a bathroom together and acknowledge their attraction. They nearly kiss before Will unlocks the door. They later argue which leads to them kissing and having sex. Jessica fears she has contracted HIV after being led to believe by Will that Kris is HIV positive. Jessica has an HIV test which comes back negative. Kris also receives a HIV negative result but cannot forgive Jessica's judgemental reaction.

Jessica discovers that her father, Clive is bankrupt, which ends her glamorous lifestyle and plunges her into the harsh realities of being a low-income student. She has sex with Kris's brother Malachy Fisher (Glen Wallace), to make Kris jealous and get back at him for sleeping with Nathan. Jessica also helps Kris tell Malachy about his cross-dressing and bisexuality, which leaves him disgusted. Jessica and Kris have sex again and she is supportive when Kris reveals he feels only able to offer a casual sexual relationship. Kris leaves the village for a while. Elliot informs Jessica about Freeganism when she is cannot afford to buy food, however rather than taking food waste from the Ashworth's shop she takes food from the storeroom.

Jessica's financial situation worsens and bailiffs seize her belongings. Jessica tries to find money and Tony refuses to give her job back, OB offers her a job as MOBS, dressing as a Strawberry. A passer-by offers her a job surveying property for resale at a high mark-up. Jessica feels guilty about conning people, however desperate for money, she scams items for Jack and Frankie and then spend the money on clothing. Frankie is angry when she discovers the truth and throws Jessica out of her pub. Clive returns and offered to repay her debts, claiming have his money back. He is still bankrupt and wants to use Jessica to seduce a potential business partner. However he is arrested before he secures the deal. Jessica is upset and refuses to visit Clive in prison, until Zak Ramsey (Kent Riley) convinces her. Clive claims he and Jessica are alike and tells her about a hidden sum of £1000. He berates her and states she will spend it on herself rather than repaying her debts. Jessica defies his opinions and gives the money to Darren as repayment for conning him.

Jessica's boiler breaks and she asks Danny Valentine (David Judge) to fix it for the housewarming party for John Paul McQueen (James Sutton). The boiler remains faulty and carbon monoxide leaks. During the party Kris and Jessica also share a brief romantic encounter. Zak ignores a smoke alarm warning and carbon monoxide causes the party guests to become ill and pass out. Jessica worries about legal action, but the college accept all responsibility. Jessica allows John Paul to move into the flat and begins renting out Elliot's room illegally while he is away. When Elliot returns he locks himself inside Jessica's room to protest her actions and John Paul moves out.

Zoe asks Jessica to place a bet on a horse which wins. She spends the money and lies to Zoe, claiming the horse lost the race. Zoe discovers Jessica's lies and at the Fresher's ball, the pair get into a physical fight. Jessica goes to the casino with Zoe's boyfriend Darren Osborne (Ashley Taylor Dawson), they win money and celebrate by having sex on a snooker table. They later have sex again but regret their behaviour. Kris confronts them about their affair and the conversation is broadcast over the college radio. Zoe hears their confession and moves out of the student flats. Zoe then vandalises Jessica's door with crude comments and discards her clothing around the village. Jessica responds by sabotaging Zoe's instructional video for Evissa salon to make her client Carmel McQueen (Gemma Merna) seem like a prostitute. Darren loses his share of his pub business in a poker game to Warren Fox (Jamie Lomas). Darren and Jessica follow Warren's girlfriend, Louise Summers (Roxanne McKee) home. She is drunk, passes out and Darren steals Evissa's takings from the flat. He and Jessica use the money to gamble and win £200,000. When Jessica asks him what should they use the money on, Darren reveals he will use the money to buy back his share of the pub and plans to win Zoe back much to the shock and disappointment of Jessica. Darren then goes to freshen up before his departure and heads to the pub to pay Warren off. Before the clock strikes midnight, he shockingly notices all the money has gone. He discovers Jessica has stolen all the money and runs back to the student halls to retrieve it back. However it is too late for him as he discovers Jessica in taxi, fleeing with the money and the village for good.

== Reception ==
Sam Warner from Digital Spy reported that viewers remembered the character when Biddall guest-starred in rival soap opera EastEnders in 2022. A Daily Express reporter branded Jessica a "once spoiled student" who ends up "downing in debt", adding that "soap operas often chose far fetched storylines" such as Jessica's. The also noted that credit reporting agency Equifax warned Hollyoaks viewers that "the horrors of debt is all too real."
