= Johnno Dean =

UK soap opera character, created 2002

- Hollyoaks character
- Colin Wells as Johnno Dean
- Portrayed by: Mark Powley (2002–2003); Colin Wells (2003–2017)
- Duration: 2002–2005, 2017
- First appearance: 7 November 2002
- Last appearance: 31 October 2017
- Introduced by: Jo Hallows (2002); Bryan Kirkwood (2017)
In-universe information
- Occupation: Fitness Club manager
- Family: Dean
- Wife: Frankie Osborne (until 2005); Michelle Dean (2005–2017)
- Sons: Jake Dean; Craig Dean; Presley Dean
- Daughters: Debbie Dean; Steph Cunningham
- Grandsons: Matthew McQueen

Johnno Dean is a fictional character from the British soap opera Hollyoaks, played originally by Mark Powley. He first appeared in November 2002, and from April 2003 was replaced by Colin Wells until his exit on 22 July 2005. The character returned on 26 to 31 October 2017 for a guest stint to coincide with the exit of his former wife, Frankie Osborne (Helen Pearson).

== Casting ==
Mark Powley originally played Johnno but the role was recast in 2003 with Colin Wells. Hollyoaks did not anticipate Johnno becoming a central character. Powley could not renew his contract due to commitments in place to other projects. A spokesperson for the show revealed that they were delighted to cast Wells in the role, but warned he would not be like the "lothario" character Jake Booth he previously played in rival soap opera Crossroads. Wells departed the soap in 2005, and later revealed that part of the reason he left was to care for his children, who both have a rare form of Mitochondrial disease.

On 6 October 2017, it was announced that Wells had reprised his role and would return during the week commencing 23 October. Johnno returns as part of "a huge new storyline" for the Osborne family. He tempts his former wife Frankie Osborne (Helen Pearson) to join him on the road as a Cher tribute act, leaving her to make the big decision of whether to leave her husband and family in Chester.

== Storylines ==
Johnno arrived in Hollyoaks with his wife Frankie, and their children Jake, Debbie, and Craig. Their youngest daughter Steph was already introduced as a student at Hollyoaks High School. Johnno and Frankie had had problems in their marriage but were mostly happy. He had a good relationship with all of his children, but was particularly close with Steph.

Johnno began working as a lorry driver with Les Hunter. Generally a friendly, good-natured personality and a devoted family man, Johnno's early storylines see him confront Ellie Hunter about her false testimony that her brother and his daughter Debbie Dean's boyfriend Dan Hunter committed a series of attacks, when the attacker was actually Ellie's husband Toby Mills. Johnno also caught his other daughter Steph Dean physical attacking Dan and Ellie's sister Lisa Hunter and had to pull Steph off her victim, before publicly reprimanding her for her behaviour.

The family become heavily in debt after Johnno lost his job when his workplace collapsed and the Deans had to move homes. This resulted in a number of arguments between Johnno and Frankie that almost led to the collapse of their marriage. Johnno briefly turns to alcohol to cope with his troubles but when he realises how much he feels alienated from Frankie and how distressed Steph is after she is diagnosed as having epilepsy, he stopped drinking as heavily.

After losing their house, Johnno and Frankie patched up their differences and began renting a house. Johnno began working for Richard Taylor, who took him on at his fitness club, Body Boost. When a rivalry between the Dean and Taylor families began, Richard terminated Johnno's job contract. However, Richard later re-employed Johnno at Body Boost and Jake took out a mortgage to help clear the family's debt accumulated. Still feeling alienated from Frankie, Johnno began an affair with 19-year-old student named Michelle. Frankie discovered Johnno’s affair and confronted him. Frankie still tried to save the marriage but decided to divorce Johnno when he revealed that Michelle was seven months pregnant with his baby, After learning the truth of their father, Jake, Debbie and Craig decided they did not want to have any contact with their father, except Steph (which she was completed devastated and begging him to come back home), as Johnno told her that, if there anything she need, he will help her, causing Steph forgiving him first, and then he left. His departure caused Steph began to alienated her mother and siblings for abandoned their relationship with him, and will never forgive them for hurting him, although she hide it for secret. In December 2004, Steph contact her father to wish her a Merry Christmas, and will return to Hollyoaks as soon as possible, which makes her happy.

Johnno briefly returned in July 2005, telling his family that Michelle had left him for someone her own age and that she had told him that her baby was not his. Debbie has left town, but the rest of the family is still there and he wants a chance to make things up to them. Frankie, Jake and Craig are angry at him still for his affair. Steph begs her mother and brothers to forgive him.

The family is prepared to give Johnno another chance, however, Craig is unconvinced by Johnno's story so he rings Michelle and finds out that Johnno was lying and that he had in fact left Michelle and their newborn son Presley out of desperation after realising that he could not handle being a father again at his age. The family is disgusted by his behaviour, only Steph was willing to forgive him, angering her brothers and mother.

Frankie eventually agrees to forgive Johnno for his affair as she felt life was too short to remain hostile towards the father of her children. Johnno still wants another shot with Frankie, but she makes it clear she is happy with her new partner, Jack Osborne, and there was no hope of them reuniting. Johnno realises that Michelle and Presley need him more than his other family and decides to go back home. Frankie tells him he will always be her best friend. Her final words to him are: "For the first we met, we were standing at a bus stop in 1979, your cheeky grin, the white leather jacket, hair slicked back, Johnno Dean, who treats girls mean to keep them keen." With their divorce complete, Johnno marries Michelle and Steph serves as a bridesmaid. Frankie invited him and Michelle to her wedding with Jack, but they could not attend due to schedule conflicts.

For the next few years, Johnno is pretty much out of his children's lives and they all begin to consider Jack to be their father. When Craig receives a birthday card from Johnno, he rips it up and tells Jack he is better father than Johnno ever was. Steph maintains a closer relationship with Johnno then her brothers and sister, but still feels closer to Jack. In 2008, when Johnno could not attend her wedding to Max Cunningham due to work comments, Steph asks Jack to walk her down the aisle. In 2010, Steph would later visit him after discovering that she has cancer, however after her death, he didn't attend her funeral, due to flight conflicts.

In 2016, Frankie went to stay with Johnno after visiting their daughter Debbie. Upon her return to the village, she mentioned to Jack that Johnno was doing well and his relationship with Michelle was stronger. Two days later, Frankie got a call from Johnno that their children is now closer to him than before, for which she is happiness and knew that this is what Steph's wanted to see. A year later, Johnno returns to the village and see Frankie once again to invite her to tour with him as a Cher impersonator. She tells him she wishes they had not broken up but is torn about whether to leave Jack and accept his offer. She eventually chooses Jack and Johnno leaves after Frankie tells him that he is still her best friend. Two days later, Jack called him that Frankie is dead, which devastated him and could not attend the funeral, after he allowed him to go, due to his impersonator tour.

== Reception ==
A writer from Inside Soap called the character Frankie's "cheating ex-husband".
