= List of Hollyoaks characters introduced in 2005 =

The following is a list of characters that first appeared in the Channel 4 soap opera Hollyoaks in 2005, by order of first appearance.

== Rob Owen ==
Rob Owen
- Hollyoaks character
- Portrayed by: David Prosho
- Duration: 2005–2006
- First appearance: 16 March 2005
- Last appearance: 25 September 2006
- Introduced by: Jo Hallows
In-universe information
- Wife: Carrie Owen
- Sons: Russ Owen; Sam Owen
- Daughters: Nicole Owen
- Grandsons: Max Owen

Robert "Rob" Owen, played by David Prosho, made his first appearance on 16 March 2005.

He is Carrie Owen's estranged husband. He recently returned after finding out about his son Russ Owen's cancer. Originally ostracized from the family because he refused to believe his other son Sam Owen's innocence when he was imprisoned, Rob returned after Russ warned him that he could be at risk from cancer, and after his daughter Nicole Owen begged him to stay. Rob's return almost split the family again as Sam refused to accept him at first. He was forced to change his mind after Rob rescued him on a climbing trip when Sam was unable to scale the rock face on his own. When Sam realised that Rob did care for him after all, he eventually forgave him.

After Sam confessed that he had been spiking and raping girls, Rob tried to help him run away by buying him a plane ticket. This caused a bit of tension between him and Carrie. After consoling with the family, Rob, Carrie, Nicole and Russ forced Sam to turn himself in to the police and he was sentenced for 25 years. Six months down the line, Sam escaped from prison and this time the effects were to be horrendous. He burnt down the local pub The Dog in The Pond which left several people dead (including Sam himself). After Nicole was bullied at school and the Owen family receiving abuse from the minority residents of Hollyoaks, Carrie decided it was the best for her and her family to move away from Hollyoaks. Rob, Carrie and Nicole left the village behind whilst Russ stayed in Hollyoaks, to be with his wife Mercedes McQueen.

== Jeremy Peterson ==
Jeremy Peterson
- Hollyoaks character
- Portrayed by: Simon Cole
- Duration: 2005–2006
- First appearance: 15 April 2005
- Last appearance: 7 July 2006
- Introduced by: Jo Hallows

Jeremy Peterson, played by Simon Cole, made his first appearance on 15 April 2005. Hailing from a wealthy, rural background, Jeremy has problems fitting into Hollyoaks Community College's halls of residence. On his arrival, many of his roommates believe he is related to the Royal family, which leads to many of them giving him special treatment. However, they eventually realise that Jeremy is just a student with an aristocratic background.

As Jeremy's background is much different from other student residents at the halls, this often backfires on Jeremy as he finds it difficult to adapt with the others. He also has a naïve side to him as friend Joe Spencer (Matt Milburn) steals money and takes a credit card out in Jeremy's name. When Jeremy discovers the truth, with surprise, he did little and never tells Joe face to face of what he thinks of him. Jeremy leaves Hollyoaks to work as a computer games designer in San Francisco and left Joe a note telling him how hurt he was after his credit card scam.

== Stephen "Macki" Mackintosh ==
Stephen Mackintosh
- Hollyoaks character
- Portrayed by: Paul Holowaty
- First appearance: 2 May 2005
- Last appearance: 18 August 2005
In-universe information
- Occupation: Student
- Mother: Mrs. Mackintosh

Stephen "Macki" Mackintosh, played by Paul Holowaty, made his first on-screen appearance on 2 May 2005. He is a friend of Justin Burton. The two met when Justin was troubled and began buying marijuana off Macki. Soon Justin was forced to go to boot camp and sorted out his life. When Justin returned to town, Macki frequently distracted Justin and wanted him to come back to his old ways. However, Justin wanted to avoid Macki and hang around with his stepbrother Ali Taylor and friend Nicole Owen. An embittered Macki made Ali's life a misery by calling him "monkey boy" and other racist taunts, and he framed Justin for a fire started in the science lab at the school. However, after finding evidence against Macki, Justin managed to get him expelled.

Both Ali and Justin thought their troubles were over, until next term as Macki returned to school and wanted revenge. The bullying got worse and both Ali and Justin were beaten up by Macki and his friends. Ali eventually had enough of the bullying and went after him with a knife that his father, Richard, had confiscated from Justin (who got the knife to defend himself against Macki). When Ali found Macki, Macki challenged him to a one-on-one fight and led him to a quiet spot; whilst Ali's back was turned, Macki picked up a brick.

Justin, who had realised the knife was missing, found Ali just in time to see Macki with the brick. He called out to Ali, who then turned around and stabbed Macki. Ali dropped the knife and Justin told him he'd sort it all out and told Ali to go home. Ali then ran out into the road and was hit by a car. Justin hid the knife in the hospital toilets. Meanwhile, both Macki and Ali died of their injuries. A few days later, Justin went back for the knife but the police had already found it and were waiting for Justin to show up. Justin was then arrested for Macki's murder but was later found not guilty.

== Charles Hayton ==
Charles Hayton
- Hollyoaks character
- Portrayed by: Kevin McGowan
- Duration: 2005–2006
- First appearance: 12 July 2005
- Last appearance: 22 March 2006
In-universe information
- Wife: Margaret Hayton
- Daughters: Becca Hayton; Nancy Hayton
- Grandsons: Charlie Dean; Oscar Osborne

Charles Hayton, played by Kevin McGowan, made his first appearance on 12 July 2005. He is introduced as the father of Becca and Nancy Hayton. Charles and his wife Margaret Hayton were wealthy and seen as snobbish by Jake Dean and the Dean family. When Charles first met Jake, he was in garden clothes, and Jake, assuming he was the gardener, proceeded to tell him all about how humourless and stuck up Charles was. His mother Frankie Osborne, her son Craig Dean, and her daughter Steph Dean dropped in for an unplanned visit, and a drunken Frankie told the Haytons all about Jake's affair and his giving an STI to Becca. The families also clashed over wedding preparations and cost. In spite of this turmoil, Charles and Margaret attended Becca's wedding and wished her well.

Charles suffered a heart attack in early 2006 and Becca went to visit him during his recuperation. During another visit a few months later, she was in the midst of an affair with Justin Burton and wasn't actually there when Charles suddenly died.

== Margaret Hayton ==
Margaret Hayton
- Hollyoaks character
- Portrayed by: Darryl Fishwick
- Duration: 2005–2007, 2012
- First appearance: 12 July 2005
- Last appearance: 17 February 2012
In-universe information
- Husband: Charles Hayton
- Daughters: Becca Hayton; Nancy Hayton
- Grandsons: Charlie Dean; Oscar Osborne

Margaret Hayton, played by Darryl Fishwick, made her first appearance on 12 July 2005. She is introduced as the mother of Becca (Ali Bastian) and Nancy Hayton (Jessica Fox). Margaret and her husband Charles Hayton were wealthy and had some reservations about Becca's relationship with Jake Dean (Kevin Sacre), but attended their wedding. Charles suffered a heart attack the following year, and died a few months later. Margaret returned in October 2006 when she learned Becca was engaged to a much younger Justin Burton (Chris Fountain). Margaret was extremely apprehensive about the relationship, along with Nancy's relationship with a tattoo artist, but went along with what Becca and Nancy wanted. Over the course of the next year, Becca gave birth to her and Justin's son Charlie Dean, who was thought to be Jake's child, and was sent to prison and stabbed to death. When Margaret returned the next summer, she was surprised to see Nancy, who was raising Charlie, had taken up with Jake. She wanted to take Charlie to raise for herself, but Jake and Nancy refused. Margaret told Nancy she would never be as good as Becca, no matter how much she tried.

In February 2012, Margaret turns up out of the blue, and she is not pleased about Nancy's relationship with Darren Osborne (Ashley Taylor Dawson), and when Nancy thinks Darren is having an affair with Cindy Cunningham (Stephanie Waring), Margaret convinces Nancy to go and live in Canada with her once they have laid flowers on Becca's grave on Valentine's Day, the anniversary of her death, which is also the day Darren has arranged a surprise wedding for Nancy. Nancy marries Darren and decides to stay in Hollyoaks and Margaret returns to Canada alone. In June 2013, it is revealed Margaret has been killed in a car accident so Nancy flies out to Canada to make funeral arrangements.

== Rory ==
Rory
- Hollyoaks character
- Portrayed by: Alex McGettigan
- First appearance: 14 July 2005
- Last appearance: 7 September 2005
- Introduced by: Jo Hallows
In-universe information
- Brothers: Connor

Rory, played by Alex McGettigan, made his first appearance on 14 July 2005. Rory is an Irish Traveller whose caravan briefly set up a home in Chester near Tony Hutchinson's restaurant, Il Gnosh. Tony was furious at them for being what he saw as low class and driving down his business. He clashed with Rory and his brother Connor, as well as their dog Sheba. Rory also had a brief flirtation with Zara Morgan. He confided in her that he and Connor were staying because their mother was battling cancer in a local hospital. When Zara told this to Tony's wife Mandy, and Rory helped stop a robbery at Il Gnosh, Tony mended fences, somewhat, with Rory. Conor and Rory's mother's cancer went into remission and she asked to return to Ireland, which they did.

== Connor ==
Connor
- Hollyoaks character
- Portrayed by: Danann Breathnach
- First appearance: 14 July 2005
- Last appearance: 7 September 2005
- Introduced by: Jo Hallows
In-universe information
- Brothers: Rory

Connor, played by Danann Breathnach, first appeared on 14 July 2005. Connor is Rory's younger brother. He punched Tony when Tony threatened Rory. He also befriended Nicole Owen and kissed her on her birthday, much to her mother's displeasure. Nicole wanted to have her first time with Connor, but Connor realised she wasn't ready for sex. He was willing to try, but she ran out of the flat in shame. The next day, she wanted to start over, but he told her he was moving back to Ireland with his brother and mother. Just before he left, he kissed Nicole and told her he'd always love her.

== Presley Dean ==
Presley Dean
- Hollyoaks character
- First appearance: July 2005
- Last appearance: July 2005
- Introduced by: Jo Hallows
In-universe information
- Father: Johnno Dean
- Mother: Michelle Dean
- Stepmother: Frankie Osborne (2005)
- Half-brothers: Jake Dean; Craig Dean
- Half-sisters: Steph Dean; Debbie Dean
- Nephews: Matthew McQueen

Presley Dean is the illegitimate son of Johnno Dean and Michelle Dean. Johnno briefly walked out of the family home to be with his wife Frankie Osborne and their children Jake, Craig, Steph and Debbie Dean, but returned after they were disgusted with his behaviour. Johnno and Michelle married shortly afterwards when Johnno's divorce from Frankie was finalised.

In 2006, Steph went to visit to take care of him as Johnno and Michelle went for their vacation. In 2017, when Johnno returns briefly to the village, he mentions to Frankie that he is no longer with Michelle, and that 12-year-old Presley is living with him/

== Ally Harrison ==
Ally Harrison
- Hollyoaks character
- Portrayed by: Louise Marwood
- First appearance: 2 September 2005
- Last appearance: 12 September 2005
- Introduced by: David Hanson
- Spin-off appearances: Hollyoaks: Crossing the Line (2005); Hollyoaks: Let Loose (2005)
In-universe information
- Brothers: Alex Harrison

Ally Harrison, played by Louise Marwood, first appeared on 2 September 2005. She is a girl Lisa Hunter met while they were both trying to get the same item exchanged. They bonded over boyfriend troubles. Ally invited Lisa and Ben Davies to lunch, where they met Alex. Lisa and Ben assumed he was another of Ally's boyfriends, due to their close bond and the fact that they lived together, but they were actually brother and sister. Ben began to suspect Ally was trying to seduce Lisa. The foursome partied during Hollyoaks: Crossing The Line, and Ben worried Alex and Ally would want more than just friendship, but nothing came of it. Ben and Lisa temporarily stayed at Ally's new flat when they had nowhere else to go. Ally's further adventures were chronicled in Hollyoaks: Let Loose.

== Karen Taylor ==
Karen Taylor
- Hollyoaks character
- Portrayed by: Suzette Llewellyn
- Appears on: 6 September 2005
- Introduced by: David Hanson
In-universe information
- Husband: Richard Taylor
- Sons: Ali Taylor; Ethan Taylpr
- Daughters: Darlene Taylor; Georgina Taylor

Karen Taylor, played by Suzette Llewellyn, appeared on 6 September 2005. She was married to Richard, a marriage which produced Ali, Darlene, and two younger children, Ethan and Georgina. Their marriage broke up due to his affair with Liz Burton. Ali was run over after fleeing from the scene of Macki's stabbing, and Karen attended his funeral. Justin, who had been arrested for the murder, unexpectedly showed up; during an argument with Karen, he told everyone what Ali had done. Karen refused to believe him and returned home.

== Olivia Johnson ==
Olivia Johnson
- Hollyoaks character
- Portrayed by: Rochelle Gadd
- Duration: 2005–2006
- First appearance: 3 October 2005
- Last appearance: 8 September 2006
- Introduced by: David Hanson
In-universe information
- Occupation: Student

Olivia Johnson, played by Rochelle Gadd, first appeared during the episode airing on 3 October 2005. Olivia split up with her long-term boyfriend Julian before moving to Hollyoaks to study history. She found it hard to adjust to student life. She became close friends with Jessica Harris (Jennifer Biddall), but lived in her shadow as she was not as outgoing as Jessica or their new friend Steph Dean (Carley Stenson). Olivia's closest thing to a relationship was her bond with Rhys Ashworth (Andrew Moss), which he described as friends who sometimes have sex. She proved to be a good friend to Jessica in her relationship troubles with Mark Jury (Ash Newman) and Gilly Roach (Anthony Quinlan), and began learning to be more assertive as she was often walked all over by others. She and Jessica did a naked protest, as they were fired from Il Gnosh by Tony Hutchinson (Nick Pickard) when Jessica became ill from meningitis. The local newspaper came to cover the story and Olivia "accidentally" told them about Jessica playing Gilly and Mark against each other.

However, Jessica decided to forgive Olivia and the two stayed friends until Kris Fisher (Gerard McCarthy), a new student, arrived and saw that Jessica was bossing Olivia around. Kris taught Olivia to stick up for herself and one night at The Dog in the Pond public house, she told Jessica that she wasn't going to be her slave anymore; this upset Jessica and unfortunately this was their last conversation. Sam Owen (Louis Tamone) came into the pub and set fire to it; a beam fell down onto Olivia pinning her down. Joe Spencer (Joe Milburn) came in to look for her and pulled her out, but the spirit bottles fell from the shelves and into the fire and exploded, which killed both Joe and Olivia. Olivia continued to have a presence on the show after her death. Kris used some of her diary entries to hurt Jessica soon after Olivia was killed. Her face, along with the faces of Joe and the Burton twins, were put on a mural at the centre of town. When Jessica left the village in December 2007, she took one final look at the mural.

== Grace Hutchinson ==
Grace Hutchinson
- Hollyoaks character
- Portrayed by: Various (2005–2006); Chloe Thomson (2013)
- Duration: 2005–2006
- First appearance: 21 October 2005
- Last appearance: May 2006
- Spin-off appearances: Hollyoaks Later (2013)
In-universe information
- Father: Tony Hutchinson
- Mother: Mandy Morgan
- Half-brothers: Beau Ramsey; Harry Thompson; Anthony Hutchinson; Ro Hutchinson; DJ
- Half-sisters: Ella Richardson; Morgan Osborne; Dee Dee Hutchinson (adoptive); Eva Hutchinson (adoptive)
- Grandfathers: Dennis Richardson; Edward Hutchinson
- Grandmothers: Helen Cunningham; Victoria Hutchinson
- Uncles: Lewis Richardson; Dominic Reilly; Tom Cunningham

Grace Hutchinson first appeared in October 2005. She was born on-screen two months early, to parents Tony Hutchinson (Nick Pickard) and Mandy Richardson (Sarah Jayne Dunn). Grace was originally going to be called Antonia but Mandy was not keen. Antonia was then made her middle name. Mandy suffers from post-natal depression, but after she spends a while in intensive care, Mandy made friends with a woman who had a premature baby, who died and Mandy grew to love Grace in fear of losing her. Grace was christened, where Becca Dean became her godmother, while Max Cunningham, his friend Sam "OB" O'Brien and Tony's half-brother Dominic Reilly became godfathers. On 12 May 2006, aged seven months old, Grace was found dead from suspected sudden infant death syndrome, on a night Hannah Ashworth and Becca's sister Nancy Hayton were babysitting, which left the girls traumatised, after thinking it was their fault. Soon after Grace's death, Mandy left Hollyoaks in the hope of moving on and subsequently left a heart-broken Tony behind, after he had told her that it was all her fault that Grace died that night.

Following her death, Grace has been mentioned several times. Tony and his girlfriend Jacqui McQueen miscarried a baby in 2007, thus reminding Tony of Grace. In 2013 whilst speaking to Sinead O'Connor he tells her about Grace and that not a day goes by that he doesn't think about her. Mandy met another man and gave birth to their daughter Ella Richardson. Tony would later have twin children with Diane O'Connor Grace appears as a vision of Tony's in Hollyoaks Later in 2013, along with Kurt Benson

Tony had affair with Sinead on her death anniversary, and she is mentioned in 2015 as well after the baby swap involving Tony's and Diane's baby Dee Dee Hutchinson and Tegan Lomax's daughter Rose Lomax came to light. Tony mentioned that losing Dee Dee would be like losing Grace all over again. Diane then forgives Tony, realizing how much he cannot move on from Grace death.

In 2018, when Dee Dee is suffering a dangerous disease. Tony was devastated, and didn't want Dee Dee to die that way Grace is. When Tony's son Harry Thompson (Parry Glasspool) is murdered by Breda McQueen (Moya Brady), Tony tells him to keep on eye on Grace in heaven. After her half-sister Ella is arrested for Jordan's murder, both Nancy and Darren understand Mandy words, despite their angry towards her for covering Ella's up, as she didn't want to go through a lot just like what happen to Grace.

== Mark Jury ==
Mark Jury
- Hollyoaks character
- Portrayed by: Ash Newman
- Duration: 2005–2006
- First appearance: 13 October 2005
- Last appearance: 24 March 2006
- Introduced by: David Hanson

Mark Jury, played by Ash Newman, made his first appearance on 13 October 2005. He remained on-screen until his following departure in 2006.

In 2005, it was announced that former Family Affairs actor and the youngest winner ever of the Best Actor Award at the New York Independent Film Festival, Ash Newman, had been cast in the role of Mark. The character was given a backstory as the old boyfriend of established character Jessica Harris (Jennifer Biddall).

Mark arrives in the village to see his ex-girlfriend Jessica, who did not know he was visiting, in an attempt to rebuild their relationship. He decides to switch courses and transfer from his old university to study at Hollyoaks Community College. Mark is ecstatic when Jessica agrees to resume their relationship. However, he discovers that Gilly Roach (Anthony Quinlan) also likes Jessica. Mark is shocked when Jessica reveals that she has been going out with both of them simultaneously.

Mark begins to feud with Gilly for Jessica's affection, however, she grows tired of their arguing and refuses to go out with either of them. Mark cannot cope with the rejection and contemplates quitting university to escape Jessica. When Olivia Johnson (Rochelle Gadd) discovers his plans, she talks him out of it. Following her advice, he transfers to another university and leaves Jessica behind.

== Freddy Watson ==
Freddy Watson
- Hollyoaks character
- Portrayed by: Greg Kelly
- First appearance: 23 November 2005
- Last appearance: 15 December 2005
- Introduced by: David Hanson

Freddy Watson, played by Greg Kelly, first appeared on 23 November 2005. Freddy studied English literature at HCC and was an animal rights campaigner. He arrived in 2005 and had a less than secret admirer in Zara Morgan, an avid protester against anything and everything. She didn't realise he was using her to get revenge against HCC for animal rights.

Freddy also conspired with Chris to depose Lee Hunter from his presidency, but this backfired when Zara told the student council about the plot, and Freddy's involvement with the HCC Media Lab Fire in December 2005.

Freddy was not seen again, but it would appear that along with Zara and Lee, he and Chris were kicked out of HCC.

== Bill Ashworth ==
Bill Ashworth
- Hollyoaks character
- Portrayed by: John Jardine
- Duration: 2005–2007
- First appearance: 21 December 2005
- Last appearance: February 2007
- Introduced by: David Hanson (2005); Bryan Kirkwood (2007)
In-universe information
- Family: Ashworth
- Sons: Neville Ashworth; Noel Ashworth
- Grandsons: Rhys Ashworth; Josh Ashworth
- Granddaughters: Hannah Ashworth

Bill Ashworth, played by John Jardine, made his first appearance on 21 December 2005. He is introduced as the father of Noel and Neville Ashworth. He was a retired bus driver and army veteran but despite his leaning towards military precision in all things, he never lost his sense of fun. With an eye for the ladies, he was not ready to settle into old age. Bill was a gambler and ran a book on any subject. He lived at a nursing home and often visited his family during Christmas holidays. However, when his best friend at the home died, Bill felt lonely and wanted to move in with his family. It was left up to his grandson Josh Ashworth and his cousin Jamie "Fletch" Fletcher to help Bill out of the nursing home and moved him into the Ashworths' house. With much dispute between Suzanne Ashworth and his son Neville Ashworth, they decided to let Bill stay after the children received a pay off from Bill in convincing their parents to let him stay. Often Bill made a mess around the house, which left Suzanne frustrated but Bill decided to give something back to the family in exchange for letting him stay. When Neville was sacked from his job, Bill gave him his inheritance which helped Neville to buy Drive and Buy. Also, the children received their inheritance as well, which was tied up into the family business.

Bill was last seen at his daughter Hannah Ashworth's 18th birthday in 2007 and for unexplained reasons did not attend his grandson and Suzanne's son Rhys Ashworth's funeral in 2012.

== Other characters ==
| Character | Date(s) | Actor | Circumstances |
|---|---|---|---|
| Nathan Haywood | 5 January–17 February | Robert Norbury | A friend of Justin Burton and Ali Taylor. When he first appeared, Justin and Ali were jealous of him, mainly due to his football skills and wealth. Despite their jealousy, Ali and Justin became friends with Nathan. Nathan disappeared from Hollyoaks in order to make Justin and Ali's bullying storyline their priority. In 2010, Norbury returned playing regular character Riley Costello, coincidentally also a keen footballer. |
| Mike | 19 April | Bryan Lawrence | A plumber who fixed the plumbing Steph Dean broke in her family flat. They did not have the money to pay him, so Steph arranged a date for Mike and her mother Frankie. Mike turned out to be a nice man, but Frankie got drunk to combat her nerves and threw up in his lap when he tried to kiss her. |
| Robin Whittle | 18 May | Phil Corbett | Craig Dean's business teacher, who took a very hard line with him over his plans for the future. To Craig's horror, Robin went out with Frankie after they met in the supermarket. Craig asked her to drop him, but Frankie refused. Only when Robin criticised Craig's abilities and put down single-parent families did Frankie tell him to leave. |
| Inspector Blake | 15–29 July | James Nickerson | Dealt with Mel after she was arrested for drunkenly breaking into her old home and resisting arrest. A few weeks later, he arrested her mother Liz for her one-woman protest against the Travellers. |
| Vicar | 29 July–26 August | John Elkington | He tried to persuade Becca Hayton and Jake Dean to wait another year to get married, but Jake's impassioned plea convinced him of the relationship. Frankie and Jack Osborne decided on a double wedding with her son Jake and his fiancé. In order to get the vicar's permission, Frankie's son Craig lied that Frankie had a terminal illness. He and Jack found out the truth at the reception, and jokingly convinced her the wedding was invalid. |
| Edward Johnson | 9 August | Paul Kynman | A man who was mentioned by Bombhead's late mother in a letter. While searching for Edward, Bombhead tracked him down at the circus, Edward insisted he'd only had a short fling with his mother which took place before Bombhead's conception. |
| D.S. Simpson | 19–26 August | Chuk Iwuji | Investigated the fatal stabbing of Stephen "Macki" Mackintosh. |
| Damien | 29 August | Richard Cadman | Damien and his friends got into an argument with Sam and Andy in the SU Bar. They waited for Sam outside the bar, but Andy ran them off by setting off a police siren. |
| Alex Harrison | 2 September–12 December | Alister Southey | The brother of Ally Harrison. His further adventures were chronicled in Hollyoaks: Let Loose. |
| Ethan Taylor | 5 September | Uncredited | The son of Karen (Suzette Llewellyn) and Richard Taylor (Richard Calkin). He and his sister Georgina attend the funeral of their older brother Ali along with their parents. |
| Georgina Taylor | 5 September | Uncredited | The daughter of Karen (Suzette Llewellyn) and Richard Taylor (Richard Calkin). She and her brother, Ethan attend the funeral of their older brother Ali along with their parents. |
| Police Officer | 6 September | Loveday Smith | The police officer interviewed Steph after she accidentally stopped a thief. |
| Aphrodite | 7 September–16 December | Jessica Frain | Aphrodite was a snake charmer who appeared at Lee Hunter's house party during Hollyoaks: Crossing The Line. Lee fell head over heels for the curvaceous blonde, not realising his rival Chris Fenwick had set him up with a transvestite. Lee was horrified upon learning the truth. Aphrodite returned to his house a few days later to pick up her snake, Pete. |
| Gemma | 2 November | Raine Davison | Gemma was the mother of Daisy, a baby born prematurely in October 2005. Mandy Richardson (Sarah Jayne Dunn) had also given birth to a premature baby the same month, but avoided the NICU as she feared that the baby would die. Mandy's brother-in-law Dom Reilly John Pickard) visited Mandy and the baby in hospital. Dom spoke to Gemma, who told him that Daisy had been removed from the ventilator as her condition had improved. Gemma also told Dom that she did not recognise Daisy, making Dom realise that Mandy had not seen her baby. Daisy later died from complications of being born premature in November 2005. Her death resulted in Mandy deciding that she wanted to see her baby. |
| Mrs Mackintosh | 14–18 November | Jane Godber | Stephen "Macki" Mackintosh's mother. |
