= The Corsham School =

Location
- The Tynings; Corsham, Wiltshire, SN13 9DF; England; 51°25′49″N 2°11′29″W

Information
- Type: Academy
- Motto: Dream Believe Achieve
- Department for Education URN: 136611 Tables
- Ofsted: Reports
- Chair of Governors: Jane Clarke
- Headteacher: Rod Bell
- Staff: 120
- Gender: Coeducational
- Age: 11 to 18
- Enrolment: 1,531 (September 2026)
- Houses: Burlington; Freestone; Hazelbury; Stockwell
- Colours: Navy and white
- Website: www.corsham.wilts.sch.uk

The Corsham School is a large secondary school, with a sixth form, in Corsham, Wiltshire, England. The school has academy status, and as of January 2025 has 1,361 pupils enrolled.

== Catchment ==
Students attend from the market town of Corsham and nearby villages such as Colerne, Neston, Box, Lacock, Shaw and Batheaston; and from more distant places such as the towns of Chippenham and Melksham and the city of Bath.

== Layout ==
The school has five main blocks R, H, L, S, T. It has two playgrounds and a large field which are used at break time and lunchtime and also for PE lessons. The school also makes use of the nearby Springfield Community Campus, with its pitches and swimming pool, for PE lessons.

== Academic standards ==
An Ofsted inspection in September 2019 graded the school as 'Good' in every rating category. A follow-up inspection in January 2025 found that the school had taken effective action to maintain the standards identified at the previous inspection; for this type of assessment, Ofsted no longer issues grades.

== History ==
The Corsham School opened as a comprehensive school in 1972, replacing Corsham Secondary Modern School which had opened in 1955. The school specialised as a Visual Arts College until the closure of the Specialist schools programme in 2011.

== Student Leaders ==
The Corsham School has an alternative approach to student leadership. After removing the traditional student council system in 2014, a new system was introduced whereby Student Leaders are appointed from the sixth form.

The Student Leaders' work has included:

- Organising a trip to the Palace of Westminster and a Q&A session with Michelle Donelan MP.
- Supporting Corsham Churches' food bank with food collections, design competitions and volunteering events.
- Championing students' issues with headteachers, governors, councillors, and Members of Parliament.

== Notable past pupils ==
- Jessica Decca Aitkenhead, Guardian columnist
- Jennifer Biddall, actress
- Darren Eadie, former Premier League and England footballer
- Eddie Holmes, virologist
- Stephanie Millward, Paralympic swimmer
- Caroline Norris, television producer, co-creator and producer of Horrible Histories for CBBC
- Gavin Schmidt, NASA climatologist
- Joe Sugg, YouTuber
- Zoe Sugg, YouTuber and author
