= CI5: The New Professionals =

1999 British television crime drama series

- Genre: Crime drama; Action
- Created by: Brian Clemens
- Written by: Brian Clemens; Steven Whitney
- Directed by: Raymond Austin; Colin Bucksey; Harley Cokeliss; John Davies
- Starring: Edward Woodward; Kal Weber; Colin Wells; Lexa Doig; Adrian Irvine; Charlotte Cornwell
- Theme music composer: Laurie Johnson
- Composers: Hywel Maggs; Chris Winter
- Country of origin: United Kingdom
- Original language: English
- No. of series: 1
- No. of episodes: 13

Production
- Executive producers: David Bainbridge; Brian Clemens; Peter Hitchen; Laurie Johnson
- Producer: David Wickes
- Cinematography: Peter Belcher; Ken Brinsley; Frank P. Flynn; Robin Vidgeon
- Editors: John Grover; Hugo Middleton
- Running time: 50 minutes
- Production company: David Wickes TV

Original release
- Network: Sky One
- Release: 19 September – 19 December 1999

Related
- The Professionals

CI5: The New Professionals is a British television action crime drama series, created and principally written by Brian Clemens, that first broadcast on Sky One on 19 September 1999. Billed as an updated version of the 1970s terrestrial television series The Professionals, the series is set in a fictional government agency known as CI5 (Criminal Intelligence Department 5). The original group of three men - Doyle, Bodie and their boss Cowley - are replaced by a team consisting of Harry Malone (Edward Woodward), Chris Keel (Kal Weber), Sam Curtis (Colin Wells) and Tina Backus (Lexa Doig). In a similar manner to The Professionals, the series included a number of high-budget impressive action sequences, often filmed in a James Bond-esque style.

An initial thirteen episode series was offered to all major British broadcasters. At one time, it was suggested that ITV would broadcast the series, but after attempting to secure a cheaper deal for broadcast rights, producer David Wickes told The Daily Mail that he "would sooner lock it away in a vault than hand it over to ITV for next to nothing." Sky chose to invest in the series, after considerable editing which removed a number of sequences deemed "excessively violent or disturbing".

Sky provided the show with considerable pre-publicity, but viewer response to the show was extremely poor, with the low production values and perceived low-quality acting being widely mocked among those who watched it. The inevitable comparisons to the original series were uniformly negative, also the series was not a success in the ratings. The series was repeated on Sky One in December 2000. the series was not repeated on any other satellite television channel until 2012. The series, in its original, uncut form, was eventually released on Region 2 DVD on 8 August 2016.

== Development ==
David Wickes, an episode director for the original series, approached original series creator Brian Clemens in the early 1990s after realising how perpetually popular the original series remained through repeats and video sales. Having since formed his own production company, David Wickes Television, and having already produced several lucrative and award-winning productions, such as Jack The Ripper (co-starring The Professionals actor Lewis Collins), Wickes spent the 1990s devising the production of an updated show, based on Clemens' original intentions. Clemens intended for the original series to be an "ensemble" group, not just focusing on the three main characters. The new show was intended to return to this intended ideal, with the new 4.5 (originally Doyle) and 3.7 (Bodie) as part of a team effort.

Of the original series' stars, Gordon Jackson died in 1990 and allegedly, though not verified, Wickes "never even thought" of approaching Martin Shaw. Since some of the co-financing for the show was derived from his association with American TV networks, he did, however, approach Lewis Collins to see if he would reprise his role of Bodie as the Controller of CI5. This was because Collins had based himself almost exclusively in America since the mid-1990s. Collins declined the role, and so instead Edward Woodward, famous for his roles in Callan and The Equalizer, was cast as CI5 Head Harry Malone.

Actors Colin Wells and Kal Weber became Sam Curtis and Chris Keel respectively, whilst Lexa Doig was cast Tina Backus. Though the main "trio" along with Harry Malone carried the show, several other secondary roles such as Corrigan, Mills, Richards and Spencer were cast to ensure Clemens' original ideal was adhered to. Colin Wells and Kal Weber were claimed to get along with each other very well, and this purportedly encouraged Brian Clemens to continue writing for the new series. Of the thirteen-episode run, Clemens solely is credited with writing seven episodes and co-writing two others.

== Broadcast ==
Despite the problems caused by the show initially being shown on a satellite channel few viewers in the United Kingdom had access to, the series was sold to over fifty countries worldwide and was hugely popular in Europe. The series first known broadcast was in Sweden on Kanal 5, where broadcast commenced on 3 September 1998. The series was shown three times consecutively due to its popularity. Denmark, Ireland, Hong Kong and the Philippines also broadcast the series in 1998, more than a year before the series finally reached British audiences. Some countries, such as New Zealand, dropped the series mid-run due to disappointing viewing figures.

For several years, the series remained unrepeated. However, in November 2011, GBC TV in Gibraltar began airing the series on Sundays from 6 November. Men & Movies in the UK, then began broadcasting the series weekdays at 6:00 pm from 19 March 2012, although the episodes shown had even more judicious edits than when the series was shown by Sky One in 1999. In several episodes, whole gun battles were completely removed, with up to four minutes of extra footage cut out on top of the material already removed by Sky over a decade before. Movies4Men later began broadcasting the series in April 2012. Like the original broadcasts, the episodes were heavy edited to remove any strong violence and bloodshed. Episodes were shown weekdays at 8:00 pm.

In 2020, newly launched streaming service the Roku channel made the series available for free.

== Release ==
In March 2012, it was revealed that work was under-way on two exclusively recorded audio commentaries with creator Brian Clemens and producer David Wickes, suggesting that a potential DVD release was forthcoming. Madman Entertainment were the first to release the series on DVD, exclusively for Region 4 in August 2012. In 2014, Visual Entertainment released the series in Region 1 as a stand-alone release and as a part of the bonus content for complete collection boxset of The Equalizer.

In 2016, Network acquired the rights for a Region 2 release, which included several bonus features, including trailers, promotional films, a clip from London Tonight, an electronic press kit, image gallery and script PDFs.

== Cast ==
- Edward Woodward as Harry Malone (Episodes 1–13)
- Kal Weber as Chris Keel (Episodes 1–13)
- Colin Wells as Sam Curtis (Episodes 1–13)
- Lexa Doig as Tina Backus (Episodes 1–13)
- Adrian Irvine as Spencer (Episodes 1–7, 10–13)
- Charlotte Cornwell as the Minister (Episodes 1, 4 & 10)

== Episodes ==
No.	Title	Directed by	Written by	Original release date	Viewers (millions)
1	"Back to Business"	Christopher King	Brian Clemens	19 September 1999	0.65
A meeting of international politicians is to take place in England to discuss the problems of disused nuclear weapons falling into terrorist hands. On a mission in Bulgaria, a CI5 agent sees a dummy run by terrorists, who plan to assassinate the politicians. CI5 must piece together what information they gain from the wounded agent, and try to track down where this top-secret conference is.
2	"Phoenix"	David Wickes	Brian Clemens	26 September 1999	N/A
A professional hitman, the Phoenix, who had been believed to be eliminated in 1981, in an operation, which Malone was present at, appears to have returned from the dead to seek revenge on the men who were responsible for his "assassination". However, if the hitman runs to form, the operation to hunt down those who hunted him down may be a bluff, and the Phoenix may have another target.
3	"Tusk Force"	Ray Austin	Brian Clemens	3 October 1999	N/A
A South African minister approaches CI5 seeking help in stopping the increasing activities of ivory poachers. Malone sends Curtis and Keel to investigate and pose as potential buyers of ivory, so as to link up with an ivory smuggler. When the African minister's documents are stolen and a plane that Curtis and Keel are travelling in crashes the agents realise that their cover has been blown.
4	"Hostage"	John Davies	Brian Clemens	10 October 1999	N/A
An Albanian minister, Eliz Risha, is held hostage at an English television station along with the crew and production staff. CI5 are called in to deal with the terrorists, whose leader Panvos accuses Risha of committing atrocities. Despite the minister's denials, it is not clear if he is indeed a war criminal.
5	"First Strike"	Harry Cokeliss	Brian Clemens	17 October 1999	N/A
CI5 are assigned to locate the plutonium that was aboard a cargo plane that has crashed in the Louisiana swamplands. They have to prevent a potential catastrophe by ensuring that the original consignee, a paramilitary force led by an ex-US Army colonel, do not obtain the cargo first.
6	"Samurai Wind"	Ray Austin	Steven Whitney & Duncan Gould	24 October 1999	N/A
Curtis and Keel go to an island in the South Pacific to stop a deranged security expert who plans to release nerve gas into Tokyo unless the Japanese government meet his demands.
7	"Skorpion"	Ken Grieve	Steven Whitney	7 November 1999	N/A
A Russian gang known as 'Skorpion' kidnaps a brilliant computer scientist and his daughter in an attempt to force him to help them gain control of NATO's computers.
8	"Choice Cuts"	Colin Bucksey	Steven Whitney	14 November 1999	N/A
Keel and Malone go undercover to catch the villain behind a sinister organ stealing operation.
9	"Miss Hit"	Sidney Hayers	Jeremy Burnham	21 November 1999	N/A
Curtis and Keel babysit an informant due to testify against the mafia.
10	"Orbit"	Colin Bucksey	Colin Brake	28 November 1999	N/A
Curtis and Keel are called in to investigate reports of a U.F.O. after a scientist is attacked by a strange light from space. Backus goes undercover as a journalist.
11	"High Speed"	Harry Cokeliss	Brian Clemens	5 December 1999	N/A
Curtis and Keel go undercover as racing car drivers in an operation to bring a Bosnian war criminal to justice.
12	"Souvenir"	Ray Austin	Brian Clemens	12 December 1999	N/A
Curtis agrees to meet his former MI6 controller, who is found nearly dead at a railway station, having been beaten and tortured by a group of Nazis who plan to clone Adolf Hitler.
13	"Glory Days"	John Davies	Steven Whitney & David Wickes	19 December 1999	N/A
CI5 uncover a plot by the Russian mafia to assassinate the U.S. President at a peace conference.
