= Colin Wells (actor) =

English actor (born 1963)

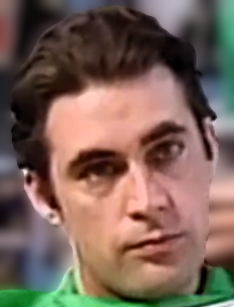
- Wells in a 1995 episode of Mr. Bean
- Born: 11 September 1963 (age 62)
- Occupation: Actor
- Years active: 1981–present

Colin Wells (born 11 September 1963) is an English actor best known for his roles of Johnno Dean between 2003 and 2005 and then again briefly in 2017 in the long-running television drama series Hollyoaks. He is also known for playing Jake Booth in the revival of Crossroads and Sam Curtis in CI5: The New Professionals.

== Selected filmography ==
- CI5: The New Professionals – Sam Curtis, 1999
- Titus – Martius, 1999
- Doctors – Eddie Melia, 2000
- Crossroads – Jake Booth, c.2001–2003
- Hollyoaks – Johnno Dean, 2003–2005, 2017
- Mr Bean – Guest, 2006 (filmed in 1995)
- Casualty – DI Moreland, 2005–2009
- Scoop – Jeffrey Epstein, 2024
