= Jennifer Biddall =

English actress (born 1980)

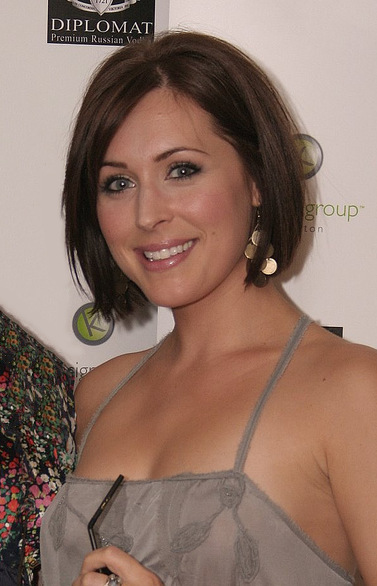
- Jennifer Biddall (2011)
- Born: 26 May 1980 (age 46); Bath, England, UK
- Occupation: Actress
- Years active: 2005–present
- Spouse: Ben Freeman (m. 2010)

Jennifer Biddall (born 26 May 1980) is an English actress who played the part of Jessica Harris in Hollyoaks from 2005 to 2008 and joined EastEnders to play Megan in 2022. She has at times been credited as Jennifer Bidall or Janet Biddall.

Biddall was born in Bath, Somerset, and grew up in Corsham, Wiltshire where she went to The Corsham School. She studied at the Bristol Old Vic Theatre School, afterwards moving to London where she appeared in the film shorts Delicate and Kidnap.

In early 2008 she ended her Hollyoaks role as Jessica Harris, later becoming part of a radio-play with ex-co-star Gerard McCarthy for 4Radio, appearing in a new musical called The EXtra Factor, and joining the musical Dreamboats and Petticoats at the Playhouse Theatre in London.

In December 2009 Biddall and actor Ben Freeman were engaged; on 10 September 2010 they were married at The Manor House Hotel, Castle Combe where Biddall's former Hollyoaks castmate Zoe Lister (Zoe Carpenter) was her bridesmaid.
